= ULEB All-Star Game =

- Status: Inactive
- Frequency: Annually
- Inaugurated: 1992
- Most recent: 1994
- Organizer: ULEB

The ULEB All-Star Game was the all-star basketball exhibition game, which took part annually from 1992 until 1994 representing players from the Spanish and the Italian Leagues and also the French in its last edition. The All-Star Games only featured foreign players from each league and were considered as part of the now defunct Spanish and Italian Lega Basket All Star Games in its all three editions, but not of the French League which joined them only in the 1994 Games.

== Background ==
The Union of European Leagues of Basketball (ULEB) was founded by the professional basketball organising bodies of Italy, France and Spain on June 25, 1991 in Rome, Italy in a bid to protect their clubs' financial interests within FIBA as their relationship with the latter has gradually started deteriorating. A year after, in November 1992, the Italian, and the Spanish League decided to unify their annual All-Star Games in a joint event that would feature the best foreign players currently competing in the top basketball leagues of Europe at the time. Madrid was chosen as the host city of the event to celebrate the anniversary of ULEB, under its president Gianluigi Porelli.

== Concept ==
The events were design on the NBA All-Star Game pattern including an exhibition game, a slam-dunk and a three-point shoot contest. The duration of the games were 48 minutes, split in four quarters of twelve minutes each. There were no domestic players representing their leagues, but only the best foreign players were chosen. The majority of them were Americans, but there were also some talented Eastern Europeans such as Arvydas Sabonis, Predrag Danilovic, Zoran Savic, Aleksandar Đorđević, Alexander Volkov, Dejan Bodiroga and the only South American Oscar Schmidt.
The first two editions were officially named ACB/Lega and Lega/ACB All-Star Games respectively, depending on the country of origins of the venue, though they were organised by the Spanish and Italian federations who were the founders of ULEB. The last edition was officially renamed ULEB All-Star Game as the other ULEB's founding member, the French Federation participated. The last All-Star Game on November 14, 1994 included three games of 24 minutes between the three Federations, with the Italian League being crowned the winner of the competition after beating the French and the Spanish All-Stars.

== List of games ==
ULEB members

| Edition | Venue | Results | MVP | Team |
|---|---|---|---|---|
| 1992 | Palacio de los Deportes, Madrid | (Spain) ACB – (Italy) Lega Basket 136 - 123 | (Lithuania) Arvydas Sabonis | ACB All-Stars |
| 1993 | PalaEur, Rome | (Italy) Lega Basket – (Spain) ACB 135 - 131 | (United States) Micheal Ray Richardson | Lega All-Stars |
| 1994 | Font de Sant Lluís, Valencia | (Italy) Lega Basket – (France) LNB 58 - 54 (Spain) ACB – (France) LNB 59 - 43 (Italy) Lega Basket – (Spain) ACB 53 - 48 | (Federal Republic of Yugoslavia) Aleksandar Đorđević | Lega All-Stars |

ULEB Euroleague

| Edition | Venue | Results | MVP | Team |
|---|---|---|---|---|
| 2002 | Raimundo Saporta Pavilion, Madrid | (Spain) Real Madrid - ULEB Euroleague All-Stars 85-91 | (United States) Tyus Edney | ULEB Euroleague All-Stars |

== 1992 ULEB All-Star Game ==
1st ULEB All-Star Game 1992–93

Arena: Palacio de los Deportes, Madrid

Date: November 14, 1992:

Season: 1992–93

Score: Liga ACB All-Stars - Lega Basket All-Stars 136–123

(Spain) ACB All-Stars:

- (United States) Joe Arlauckas
- (United States) Tim Burroughs
- (United States) Darryl Middleton
- (Croatia) Velimir Perasović
- (United States) Harold Pressley
- (United States) Kevin Pritchard
- (Lithuania) Arvydas Sabonis
- (United States) Reggie Slater
- (United States) Chandler Thompson
- (United States) Andre Turner
- (United States) Rickie Winslow
- (Socialist Federal Republic of Yugoslavia) Zoran Savic
- Head Coaches: (Spain) Miguel Ángel Martín Fernández and (Spain) Lolo Sainz

(Italy) Lega Basket All-Stars:

- (United States) Greg "Cadillac" Anderson
- (Federal Republic of Yugoslavia) Predrag Danilović
- (France) Darryl Dawkins
- (Federal Republic of Yugoslavia) Darren Daye
- (Federal Republic of Yugoslavia) Aleksandar Đorđević
- (United States) A.J. English
- (United States) Pace Mannion
- (Brazil) Oscar Schmidt
- (Croatia) Dino Rađja
- (United States) Terry Teagle
- (Ukraine) Sasha Volkov
- (United States) Haywoode Workman
- Head Coaches: (Italy) Alberto Bucci and (Italy) Ettore Messina

Game MVP: (Lithuania) Arvydas Sabonis

3 Point Contest winner: (Croatia) Danko Cvjetićanin (defeated (Socialist Federal Republic of Yugoslavia) Aleksandar Đorđević in the final)

Slam-dunk Contest winner: (United States) Chandler Thompson (defeated (United States) Antonio Davis in the final)

Liga ACB All-Stars FIAT (Coaches: Miguel Ángel Martín Fernández, Lolo Sainz): Joe Arlauckas 13, Tim Burroughs 15, Darryl Middleton 12, Velimir Perasović 3, Harold Pressley 14, Kevin Pritchard 4, Arvydas Sabonis 22, Zoran Savic 8, Reggie Slater 10, Chandler Thompson 6, Andre Turner 24, Rickie Winslow 5.
Lega Basket All-Stars POLTI (Coaches: Alberto Bucci, Ettore Messina): Greg "Cadillac" Anderson 6, Predrag Danilović 12, Darryl Dawkins 7, Darren Daye 3, Aleksandar Đorđević 2, A.J. English 12, Pace Mannion 9, Oscar Schmidt 17, Dino Rađja 8, Terry Teagle 20, Sasha Volkov 17, Haywoode Workman 5.

== 1993 ULEB All-Star Game ==
2nd ULEB All-Star Game 1993–94

Arena: PalaEur, Rome

Date: November 13, 1993

Season: 1993–94

Score: Lega Basket All-Stars - Liga ACB All-Stars 135–131

(Spain) Liga ACB All-Stars:

- (United States) Michael Anderson
- (United States) Joe Arlauckas
- (United States) Roy Fisher
- (United States) Dan Godfread
- (United States) Dennis Hopson
- (United States) Tony Massenburg
- (United States) Darryl Middleton
- (Croatia) Ivo Nakić
- (Brazil) Oscar Schmidt
- (United States) Fred Roberts
- (United States) Andy Toolson
- (United States) Andre Turner
- Head Coaches: (United States) Clifford Luyk and (Spain) José Alberto Pesquera

(Italy) Lega Basket All-Stars:

- (Federal Republic of Yugoslavia) Dejan Bodiroga
- (United States) Joe Binion
- (Federal Republic of Yugoslavia) Aleksandar Đorđević
- (Federal Republic of Yugoslavia) Predrag Danilović
- (United States) Winston Garland
- (United States) Dean Garrett
- (United States) Dan Gay
- (United States) Shelton Jones
- (United States) Cliff Levingston
- (United States) George McCloud
- (United States) Micheal Ray Richardson
- (United States) Henry Williams
- Head Coaches: (Italy) Alberto Bucci and (Italy) Fabrizio Frates

Game MVP: (United States) Micheal Ray Richardson

3 Point Contest winner: (Brazil) Oscar Schmidt (defeated (Socialist Federal Republic of Yugoslavia) Aleksandar Đorđević in the final)

Slam-dunk Contest winner: not held

Liga ACB All-Stars (Coaches: Clifford Luyk, José Alberto Pesquera): Michael Anderson 8, Joe Arlauckas 10, Roy Fisher 4, Dan Godfread 6, Dennis Hopson 11, Tony Massenburg 24, Darryl Middleton 10, Ivo Nakić 0, Oscar Schmidt 20, Fred Roberts 14, Andy Toolson 9, Andre Turner 15.
Lega Basket All-Stars POLTI (Coaches: Alberto Bucci, Fabrizio Frates): Joe Binion 4, Dejan Bodiroga 9, Predrag Danilović 16, Aleksandar Đorđević 5, Winston Garland 4, Dean Garrett 12, Dan Gay 4, Shelton Jones 9, Cliff Levingston 16, George McCloud 15, Micheal Ray Richardson 23, Henry Williams 18.

== 1994 ULEB All-Star Game ==
3rd ULEB All-Star Game 1994–95

Arena: Pavelló Municipal Font de Sant Lluís, Valencia

Date: November 14, 1994

Season: 1994–95

Scores:

- Lega Basket All-Stars - LNB All-Stars 58–54
- Liga ACB All-Stars - LNB All-Stars 59–43
- Lega Basket All-Stars - Liga ACB All-Stars 53–48 (Final)

(Italy) Lega Basket All-Stars:

- (Federal Republic of Yugoslavia) Dejan Bodiroga
- (United States) Wendell Alexis
- (Federal Republic of Yugoslavia) Aleksandar Đorđević
- (Federal Republic of Yugoslavia) Joe Binion
- (United States) Dallas Comegys
- (United States) Emanual Davis
- (United States) Dan Gay
- (United States) Gerald Glass
- (United States) Billy McCaffrey
- (North Macedonia) Petar Naumoski
- (United States) Jeff Sanders
- (United States) John Turner
- Head Coaches: (Italy) Alberto Bucci and (Socialist Federal Republic of Yugoslavia) Bogdan Tanjević

(Spain) Liga ACB All-Stars:

- (United States) Darrell Armstrong
- (United States) Michael Curry
- (United States) Roy Fisher
- (United States) Dan Godfread
- (United States) Kenny Green
- (United States) Warren Kidd
- (United States) Darryl Middleton
- (Croatia) Corny Thompson
- (Brazil) Oscar Schmidt
- (United States) Andy Toolson
- (United States) Andre Turner
- Head Coaches: (Spain) Aíto García Reneses and (Spain) Manu Moreno

(France) LNB All-Stars:

- (United States) Ron Anderson
- (United States) Winston Crite
- (United States) Ron Curry
- (United States) Tim Kempton
- (United States) Conrad McRae
- (United States) David Rivers
- (United States) Michael Ray Richardson
- (United States) Delaney Rudd
- (United States) Rickie Winslow
- (United States) Michael Young
- Head Coaches: (Socialist Federal Republic of Yugoslavia) Božidar Maljković and (France) Jacques Monclar

Tournament MVP: (Socialist Federal Republic of Yugoslavia) Aleksandar Đorđević

3 Point Contest winner: (Croatia) Aleksandar Đorđević (defeated (Socialist Federal Republic of Yugoslavia) Dejan Bodiroga in the final)

Slam-dunk Contest winner: (United States) Chandler Thompson (defeated (United States) Darrell Armstrong in the final)

Game 1
Lega Basket All-Stars (Coaches: Alberto Bucci, Bogdan Tanjević): Wendell Alexis 4, Joe Binion 5, Dejan Bodiroga 8, Dallas Comegys 2, Emanual Davis D/P, Aleksandar Đorđević 22, Dan Gay 8, Gerald Glass 5, Billy McCaffrey D/P, Petar Naumoski 0, Jeff Sanders 4, John Turner 0.
LNB All-Stars (Coaches: Božidar Maljković, Jacques Monclar): Ron Anderson 8, Winston Crite 4, Ron Curry 6, Tim Kempton 2, Conrad McRae 4, David Rivers 5, Michael Ray Richardson 8, Delaney Rudd 2, Rickie Winslow 9, Michael Young 6.

Game 2
Liga ACB All-Stars (Coaches: Aíto García Reneses, Manu Moreno): Darrell Armstrong 3, Michael Curry 18, Roy Fisher 3, Dan Godfread 4, Kenny Green 2, Warren Kidd 2, Darryl Middleton 7, Oscar Schmidt 0, Corny Thompson 4, Andy Toolson 8, Andre Turner 8.
LNB All-Stars (Coaches: Božidar Maljković, Jacques Monclar): Ron Anderson 0, Winston Crite 9, Ron Curry 14, Tim Kempton 2, Conrad McRae 6, Michael Ray Richardson 0, David Rivers 7, Delaney Rudd 0, Rickie Winslow 3, Michael Young 2.

Game 3
Lega Basket All-Stars (Coaches: Alberto Bucci, Bogdan Tanjević): Wendell Alexis 2, Joe Binion D/P, Dejan Bodiroga 8, Dallas Comegys 5, Emanual Davis 5, Aleksandar Đorđević 10, Dan Gay 4, Gerald Glass 0, Billy McCaffrey 5, Petar Naumoski 2, Jeff Sanders 4, John Turner 5.
Liga ACB All-Stars (Coaches: Aíto García Reneses, Manu Moreno): Darrell Armstrong 4, Michael Curry 4, Roy Fisher 2, Dan Godfread 2, Kenny Green D/P, Warren Kidd 2, Darryl Middleton 8, Oscar Schmidt 9, Corny Thompson 0, Andy Toolson 3, Andre Turner 14.

== Three-Point Shootout ==
| Edition | Venue | Winner | Team | Runner-up | Team |
|---|---|---|---|---|---|
| 1992 | Palacio de los Deportes, Madrid | (Croatia) Danko Cvjetićanin | ACB All-Stars | (Federal Republic of Yugoslavia) Aleksandar Đorđević | Lega All-Stars |
| 1993 | PalaEur, Rome | (Brazil) Oscar Schmidt | ACB All-Stars | (Federal Republic of Yugoslavia) Aleksandar Đorđević | Lega All-Stars |
| 1994 | Font de Sant Lluís, Valencia | (Federal Republic of Yugoslavia) Aleksandar Đorđević | Lega All-Stars | (Federal Republic of Yugoslavia) Dejan Bodiroga | Lega All-Stars |

== Slam Dunk Contest ==
| Edition | Venue | Winner | Team | Runner-up | Team |
|---|---|---|---|---|---|
| 1992 | Palacio de los Deportes, Madrid | (United States) Chandler Thompson | ACB All-Stars | (United States) Antonio Davis | Lega All-Stars |
| 1993 | PalaEur, Rome | Not held | | | |
| 1994 | Font de Sant Lluís, Valencia | (United States) Chandler Thompson (2) | ACB All-Stars | (United States) Darrell Armstrong | Lega All-Stars |

== Players with multiple selections ==
| Player | All-Star | Editions | Team |
|---|---|---|---|
| (United States) Darryl Middleton | 3 | 1992, 1993, 1994 | ACB All-Stars |
| (Federal Republic of Yugoslavia) Aleksandar Đorđević | 3 | 1992, 1993, 1994 | Lega All-Stars |
| (United States) Andre Turner | 3 | 1992, 1993, 1994 | ACB All-Stars |
| (Brazil) Oscar Schmidt | 3 | 1992, 1993, 1994 | Lega All-Stars, ACB All-Stars |
| (United States) Michael Ray Richardson | 2 | 1993, 1994 | Lega All-Stars, LNB All-Stars |
| (United States) Rickie Winslow | 2 | 1992, 1994 | ACB All-Stars, LNB All-Stars |
| (United States) Joe Arlauckas | 2 | 1992, 1993 | ACB All-Stars |
| (Federal Republic of Yugoslavia) Predrag Danilović | 2 | 1992, 1993 | Lega All-Stars |
| (United States) Andy Toolson | 2 | 1993, 1994 | ACB All-Stars |
| (United States) (Italy) Dan Gay | 2 | 1993, 1994 | Lega All-Stars |
| (United States) Joe Binion | 2 | 1993, 1994 | Lega All-Stars |

== Coaches with most appearances ==
| Player | All-Star | Editions | Team |
|---|---|---|---|
| (Italy) Alberto Bucci | 3 | 1992, 1993, 1994 | Lega All-Stars |

== Top Scorers ==
=== Per edition ===
| Edition | Player | Points | Team |
|---|---|---|---|
| 1992 | (United States) Andre Turner | 24 | (Spain) ACB All-Stars |
| 1993 | (United States) Micheal Ray Richardson | 23 | (Italy) Lega All-Stars |
| 1994 | (Socialist Federal Republic of Yugoslavia) Aleksandar Đorđević | 32* | (Italy) Lega All-Stars |

=== All-time ===
| Rank | Player | Points | Team |
|---|---|---|---|
| 1 | (United States) Andre Turner | 61 | (Spain) ACB All-Stars |
| 2 | (Brazil) Oscar Schmidt | 46 | (Italy) Lega All-Stars, (Spain) ACB All-Stars |
| 3 | (Federal Republic of Yugoslavia) Aleksandar Đorđević | 39 | (Italy) Lega All-Stars |
| 4 | (United States) Darryl Middleton | 37 | (Spain) ACB All-Stars |
| 5 | (United States) Michael Ray Richardson | 31 | (Italy) Lega All-Stars |

== 2002 ULEB Euroleague All-Stars ==
On 2 October 2002 Euroleague All-Star Team led by Tyus Edney defeated Real Madrid at the Raimundo Saporta Pavilion in an exhibition game 91-85.

- Real Madrid - Euroleague All-Stars 85-91

Real Madrid (22+15+21+27): Michael Hawkins 2, Alberto Herreros 16, Lucio Angulo 7, Derrick Alston 6, Eduardo Hernández-Sonseca 11; Alain Digbeu 14, Dragan Tarlac 16, Lucas Victoriano 13, Maciej Lampe, Samuel Nadeau. Coach: Javier Imbroda

Euroliga Stars (21+23+14+33): Tyus Edney 16, Ariel McDonald 9, Alvertis 2, Turkcan 2, Marcelo Nicola 8; Michalis Kakiouzis 18, Luis Scola 8, Gregor Fucka 11, Navarro 3, Gur Shelef 2, Nikola Vujčić 12, Frédéric Weis; Coach: Zeljko Obradovic.

- ULEB members by 2002 were federations from: Greece, Italy, Spain, France, Belgium, Netherlands, Portugal, Switzerland, UK, Germany and Poland (11). Bosnia and Herzegovina, Croatia, Austria, North Macedonia, Montenegro, Serbia, Slovenia joined in 2002.

== Distinctions ==
=== FIBA Hall of Fame ===
- (Brazil) Oscar Schmidt
- (Socialist Federal Republic of Yugoslavia) Bogdan Tanjević
- (Lithuania) Arvydas Sabonis
- (Italy) Ettore Messina
- (Soviet Union) Alexander Volkov

=== Basketball Hall of Fame ===
- (Brazil) Oscar Schmidt
- (Lithuania) Arvydas Sabonis
- (Croatia) Dino Radja

=== FIBA's 50 Greatest Players (1991) ===
- (Brazil) Oscar Schmidt
- (Lithuania) Arvydas Sabonis
- (Soviet Union) Alexander Volkov
- (Croatia) Dino Radja
- (United States) (Spain) Clifford Luyk (As a player)

== See also ==
- FIBA EuroStars
- Liga ACB Presentation Games
