= ACB contests =

Spanish basketball 3-point shootout and slam dunk contests

The ACB contests are the 3-point shootout and slam dunk contests held by the Liga ACB, the top-tier level professional club basketball league in the country of Spain.

== History ==
From 1986 through 2003, these contests were celebrated during the ACB League's weekend festival, which was called Showtime ACB, and which included the Liga ACB Stars Match (Spanish All-Star Game). From 1992 to 1994, this weekend was organized by ULEB, which held the ULEB All-Star Game. In 1992 and 1993, it was contested between the Spanish ACB League's all-stars and the Italian League's all-stars. While the French League's all-stars also joined in the contest in the 1994. After the 2003, the ACB decided not to organize the All-Star Game anymore.

Since 2004, the Liga ACB's slam dunk and 3 point shootout contests are played during the Spanish Supercup, with the exception of 2011, when they weren't organized, and 2012, when it was celebrated during the presentation of the league, in the headquarters of Endesa, the league's main sponsor.

== Liga ACB Stars Match ==
Arvydas Sabonis, two-time MVP of the all-star game (1991, 1992).

The Liga ACB's all-star game, which was called the Stars Match, was first held in 1986, and was last held in 2003.

| Year Held (Season) | Location | Results | MVP | Team |
|---|---|---|---|---|
| 1986; 1985–86 | Don Benito | Winston (Odd) 103 – Lee (Even) 97 | (United States) David Russell | Estudiantes |
| 1987; 1986–87 | Vigo | Odd Team 102 – Even Team 101 | (Spain) Jordi Villacampa | Joventut Badalona |
| 1987–88 | Not held | | | |
| 1988; 1988–89 | Zaragoza | A1 Series 104 – A2 Series 87 | (United States) Michael Young | Valladolid |
| 1989; 1989–90 | Logroño | Rioja Quality 105 – Winston 100 | (United States) Mark Davis | Zaragoza |
| 1990; 1990–91 | Zaragoza | Odd Team 112 – Even Team 128 | (Spain) Chicho Sibilio | Baskonia |
| 1991; 1991–92 | Madrid | Odd Team 98 – Even Team 93 | (Lithuania) Arvydas Sabonis | Valladolid |
| 1992; 1992–93 (Note: ULEB All-Star Game edition) | Madrid | ACB 136 – Lega Basket 123 | (Lithuania) Arvydas Sabonis (ACB All-Stars) (2) | Real Madrid |
| 1993; 1993–94 | Rome | Lega Basket 135 – ACB 131 | (United States) Micheal Ray Richardson (Lega All-Stars) | Livorno |
| 1994; 1994–95 | Valencia | Lega Basket 58 – LNB 54; ACB 59 – LNB 43; Lega Basket 53 – ACB 48 | (Federal Republic of Yugoslavia) Aleksandar Đorđević (Lega All-Stars) | Fortitudo Bologna |
| 1995; 1995–96 | Girona | Spanish Combination 91 – Foreign Combination 96 | (Spain) Alberto Herreros | Estudiantes |
| 1996; 1996–97 | Cáceres | Spanish Combination 87 – Foreign Combination 80 | (Spain) Xavi Fernandez | FC Barcelona |
| 1997; 1997–98 | Granada | Spanish Combination 94 – Foreign Combination 99 | (Spain) Juan Antonio Orenga | Real Madrid |
| 1998; 1998–99 | Murcia | Spanish Combination 96 – Foreign Combination 99 | (Spain) Alfonso Reyes | Estudiantes |
| 1999; 1999–00 | Manresa | Spanish Combination 79 – Foreign Combination 88 | (Spain) Alberto Herreros (2) | Real Madrid |
| 2001 (I); 2000–01 | Málaga | Spanish Combination 78 – Foreign Combination 91 | (Spain) Alfonso Reyes (2) | Estudiantes |
| 2001 (II); 2001–02 | Valladolid | North Team 105 – South Team 112 | (Federal Republic of Yugoslavia) Milan Gurović | Málaga |
| 2003; 2002–03 | Alicante | North Team 100 – South Team 103 | (Argentina) Walter Herrmann | Fuenlabrada |

=== Players with most MVP awards ===
| Player | Wins | Editions |
|---|---|---|
| (Spain) Alfonso Reyes | 2 | 1998, 2001 |
| (Spain) Alberto Herreros | 2 | 1995, 1999 |

== Three-Point Shootout ==
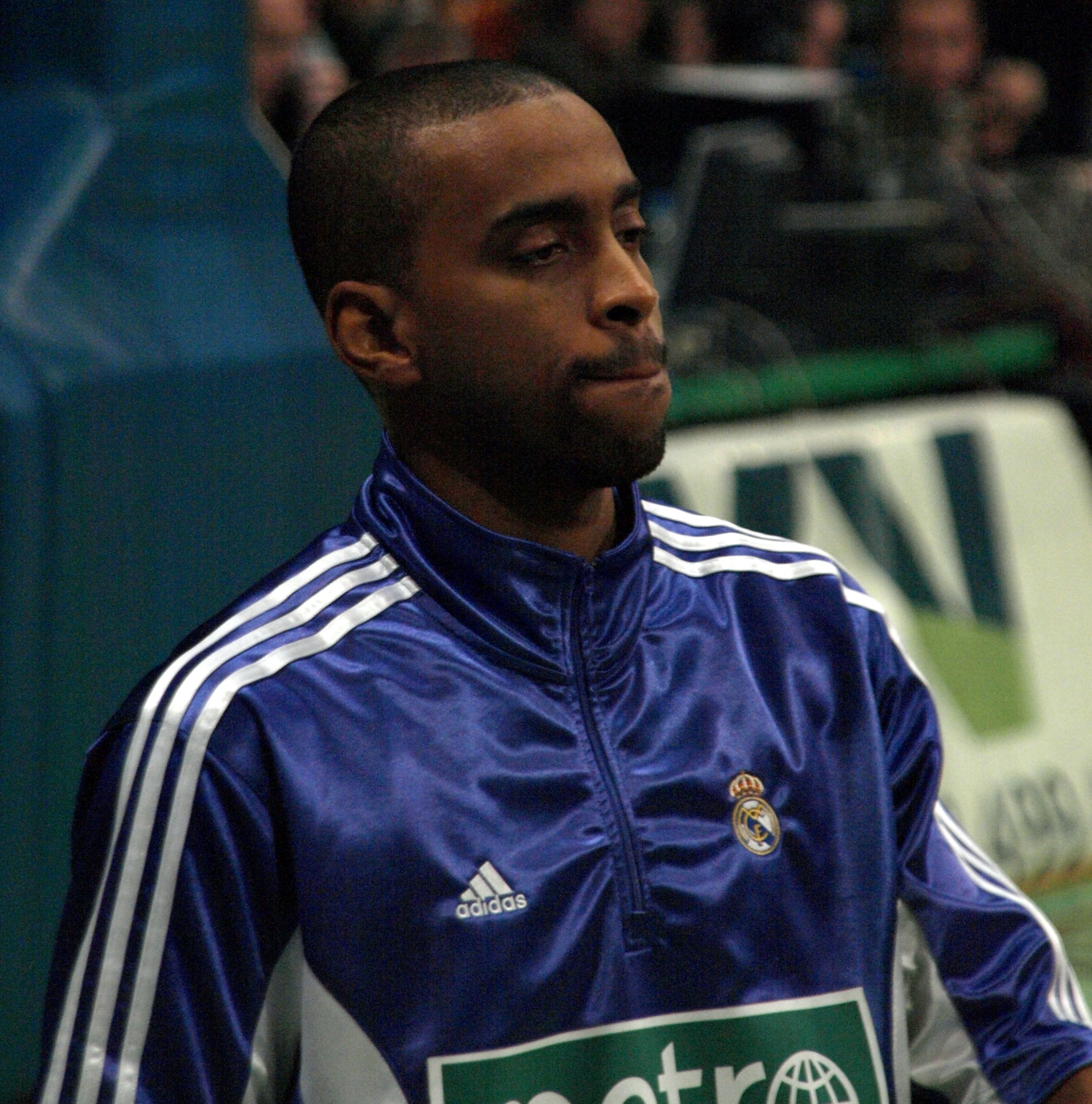
Lou Bullock, three-time winner of the three-point shootout contest (2004, 2006, 2008).

The Liga ACB's three-point shootout began in 1988. It has the same format as the NBA's three-point shootout. For the 2009 and 2011 editions, there was the possibility of a magic three-pointer from 8-meters distance (26 feet 3 inches), which was worth four points.

In some editions, a female player from the Spanish Women's League was invited. For the 2013 and 2014 contests, three-point shooting record-man Josh Ruggles, was invited.

| Year Held (Season) | Location | Winner | Team | Runner-up | Team |
|---|---|---|---|---|---|
| 1988; 1988–89 | Zaragoza | (United States) Brian Jackson | Peñas Huesca | (United States) Leon Wood | Zaragoza |
| 1989; 1989–90 | Logroño | (United States) Mark Davis | Zaragoza | (Spain) Óscar Cervantes | Granrollers |
| 1990; 1990–91 | Zaragoza | (United States) Mark Davis (2) | Zaragoza | (Spain) Óscar Cervantes (2) | Granrollers |
| 1991; 1991–92 | Madrid | (Spain) Óscar Cervantes | Granrollers | (United States) Brian Jackson | Peñas Huesca |
| 1992; 1992–93 (Note: ULEB All-Star Game edition) | Madrid | (Croatia) Danko Cvjetićanin (ACB All-Stars) | Estudiantes | (Federal Republic of Yugoslavia) Aleksandar Đorđević (Lega All-Stars) | Olimpia Milano |
| 1993; 1993–94 | Rome | (Brazil) Oscar Schmidt (ACB All-Stars) | Valladolid | (Federal Republic of Yugoslavia) Aleksandar Đorđević (2) (Lega All-Stars) | Olimpia Milano |
| 1994; 1994–95 | Valencia | (Federal Republic of Yugoslavia) Aleksandar Đorđević (Lega All-Stars) | Fortitudo Bologna | (Federal Republic of Yugoslavia) Dejan Bodiroga (Lega All-Stars) | Olimpia Milano |
| 1995; 1995–96 | Girona | (United States) Keith Jennings | Estudiantes | (Spain) Alberto Herreros | Estudiantes |
| 1996; 1996–97 | Cáceres | (Argentina) Juan Alberto Espil | Baskonia | (Spain) Raúl Pérez | Sevilla |
| 1997; 1997–98 | Granada | (Spain) Alberto Herreros | Real Madrid | (United States) Roy Fisher | León |
| 1998; 1998–99 | Murcia | (Spain) Alberto Herreros (2) | Real Madrid | (Spain) Berni Álvarez | Valencia |
| 1999; 1999–00 | Manresa | (Spain) Alberto Angulo | Real Madrid | (Spain) Berni Álvarez (2) | Valencia |
| 2001 (I); 2000–01 | Málaga | (Spain) Paco Vázquez | Málaga | (United States) David Wood | Fuenlabrada |
| 2001 (II); 2001–02 | Valladolid | (Spain) Jacobo Odriozola | Breogán | (Spain) Raúl Pérez (2) | Valladolid |
| 2003; 2002–03 | Alicante | (Spain) Raúl Pérez | Sevilla | (Spain) Jacobo Odriozola | Valladolid |
| 2003–04 | Not held | | | | |
| 2004; 2004–05 | Málaga | (United States) Lou Bullock | Real Madrid | (Lithuania) Donatas Slanina | Sevilla |
| 2005; 2005–06 | Granada | (Serbia and Montenegro) Nebojša Bogavac | Breogán | (Spain) Raúl Pérez (3) | Sevilla |
| 2006; 2006–07 | Málaga | (United States) Lou Bullock (2) | Real Madrid | (United States) Marlon Garnett | Estudiantes |
| 2007; 2007–08 | Bilbao | (Serbia) Igor Rakočević | Baskonia | (United States) Lou Bullock | Real Madrid |
| 2008; 2008–09 | Zaragoza | (United States) Lou Bullock (3) | Real Madrid | (United States) Demond Mallet | Joventut Badalona |
| 2009; 2009–10 | Las Palmas | (Spain) Pedro Robles | Murcia | (Ukraine) Sergiy Gladyr | Manresa |
| 2010; 2010–11 | Vitoria-Gasteiz | (Ukraine) Sergiy Gladyr | Manresa | (United States) Jimmy Baron | Gipuzkoa |
| 2011; 2011–12 | Not held | | | | |
| 2012; 2012–13 | Madrid | (Ukraine) Sergiy Gladyr (2) | Fuenlabrada | (Spain) Rafa Martínez | Valencia |
| 2013; 2013–14 | Vitoria-Gasteiz | (United States) Josh Ruggles | (amateur) | (Azerbaijan) Jaycee Carroll | Real Madrid |
| 2014; 2014–15 | Vitoria-Gasteiz | (United States) Josh Ruggles (2) | (amateur) | (Azerbaijan) Jaycee Carroll (2) | Real Madrid |
| 2015; 2015–16 | Málaga | (Azerbaijan) Jaycee Carroll | Real Madrid | (United States) Demond Mallet | Joventut Badalona |
| 2016; 2016–17 | Vitoria-Gasteiz | (Azerbaijan) Jaycee Carroll (2) | Real Madrid | (Spain) Alberto Corbacho | Obradoiro |
| 2017; 2017–18 | Las Palmas | (Sweden) Marcus Eriksson | Gran Canaria | (Argentina) Lucio Redivo | Bilbao Basket |
| 2018; 2018–19 | Santiago de Compostela | (United States) Matt Thomas | Valencia | (Spain) Óscar Herrero | (amateur) |
| 2019; 2019–20 | Madrid | (Australia) Brock Motum | Valencia | (Croatia) Marko Popović | (retired) |

== Slam Dunk Contest ==
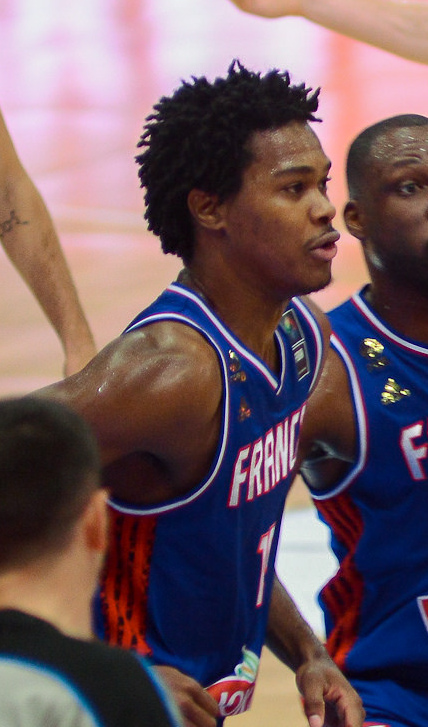
Mickaël Gelabale, two-time winner of the slam dunk contest (2004, 2005).

The Liga ACB's Slam Dunk Contest was first held in 1986, and was last held in 2012.

| Season | Location | Winner | Team | Runner-up | Team |
|---|---|---|---|---|---|
| 1986; 1985–86 | Don Benito | (United States) David Russell | Estudiantes | (United States) Wayne Robinson | Real Madrid |
| 1987; 1986–87 | Vigo | (United States) David Russell (2) | Estudiantes | (United States) Wayne Robinson (2) | Granrollers |
| 1987–88 | Not held | | | | |
| 1988; 1988–89 | Zaragoza | (United States) Mike Smith | Maristas de Málaga | (United States) Dan Bingenheimer | Gran Canarias |
| 1989; 1989–90 | Logroño | (United States) Rickie Winslow | Estudiantes | (Spain) Juan Rosa | Girona |
| 1990; 1990–91 | Zaragoza | (United States) Shelton Jones | Collado Villalba | (United States) David Benoit | Maristas de Málaga |
| 1991; 1991–92 | Madrid | (United States) Kenny Walker | Granrollers | (Turkey) Henry Turner | Collado Villalba |
| 1992; 1992–93 (Note: ULEB All-Star Game edition) | Madrid | (United States) Chandler Thompson (ACB All-Stars) | Ourense | (United States) Antonio Davis (Lega All-Stars) | Olimpia Milano |
| 1993; 1993–94 | Rome | Not held | | | |
| 1994; 1994–95 | Valencia | (United States) Chandler Thompson (2) (ACB All-Stars) | Ourense | (United States) Darrell Armstrong (ACB All-Stars) | Ourense |
| 1995; 1995–96 | Girona | (United States) Chandler Thompson (3) | Estudiantes | (United States) Glen Whisby | Gijón |
| 1996; 1996–97 | Cáceres | (United States) Stanley Jackson | Cáceres | (Spain) Diego Fajardo | Valladolid |
| 1997; 1997–98 | Granada | (United States) Chandler Thompson (4) | Estudiantes | (Spain) Jackie Espinosa | Joventut Badalona |
| 1998; 1998–99 | Murcia | (United States) Gaylon Nickerson | Valladolid | (United States) Rico Hill | Fuenlabrada |
| 1999; 1999–00 | Manresa | (Spain) Nate Higgs | Manresa | (United States) Glen Whisby (2) | Gijón |
| 2001 (I); 2000–01 | Málaga | (Netherlands) Francisco Elson | FC Barcelona | (France) Bienvenue Kindoki | Gran Canaria |
| 2001 (II); 2001–02 | Valladolid | (Spain) Aarón Cuellar | (amateur) | (United States) Antonio Granger | Sevilla |
| 2003; 2002–03 | Alicante | (United States) Jerod Ward | Granada | (Argentina) Walter Herrmann | Fuenlabrada |
| 2003–04 | Not held | | | | |
| 2004; 2004–05 | Málaga | (France) Mickaël Gelabale | Real Madrid | (Spain) Sergi Vidal | Baskonia |
| 2005; 2005–06 | Granada | (France) Mickaël Gelabale (2) | Real Madrid | (Spain) Saúl Blanco | Fuenlabrada |
| 2006; 2006–07 | Málaga | (France) Florent Piétrus | Málaga | (Spain) Saúl Blanco (2) | Fuenlabrada |
| 2007; 2007–08 | Bilbao | (Spain) Víctor Claver | Valencia | (United States) James Singleton | Baskonia |
| 2008; 2008–09 | Zaragoza | (Spain) Serge Ibaka | Manresa | (United Kingdom) Pops Mensah-Bonsu | Joventut Badalona |
| 2009; 2009–10 | Las Palmas | (Democratic Republic of the Congo) Christian Eyenga | Joventut Badalona | (Spain) Sergio Llull | Real Madrid |
| 2010; 2010–11 | Vitoria-Gasteiz | (Czech Republic) Tomáš Satoranský | Sevilla | (Russia) Yaroslav Korolev | Granada |
| 2011; 2011–12 | Not held | | | | |
| 2012; 2012–13 | Madrid | (United States) James Gist | Málaga | (Czech Republic) Tomáš Satoranský | Sevilla |

== ULEB All-Star Game score sheets (1992–1994) ==
1st ULEB All-Star Game 1992–93
Palacio de los Deportes, Madrid, November 14, 1992: Liga ACB All-Stars - Lega Basket All-Stars 136–123
Liga ACB All-Stars FIAT (Coaches: Miguel Ángel Martín Fernández, Lolo Sainz): Joe Arlauckas, Tim Burroughs, Darryl Middleton, Velimir Perasović, Harold Pressley, Kevin Pritchard, Arvydas Sabonis, Reggie Slater, Chandler Thompson, Andre Turner, Rickie Winslow.
Lega Basket All-Stars POLTI (Coaches: Alberto Bucci, Ettore Messina): Greg "Cadillac" Anderson, Sasha Danilović, Darryl Dawkins, Darren Daye, Sasha Đjorđjević, A.J. English, Pace Mannion, Oscar Schmidt, Dino Rađja, Terry Teagle, Sasha Volkov, Haywoode Workman.

2nd ULEB All-Star Game 1993–94
PalaEur, Rome, November 13, 1993: Lega Basket All-Stars - Liga ACB All-Stars 135–131
Liga ACB All-Stars (Coaches: Clifford Luyk, José Alberto Pesquera): Michael Anderson, Joe Arlauckas, Roy Fisher, Dan Godfread, Dennis Hopson, Tony Massenburg, Darryl Middleton, Ivo Nakić, Oscar Schmidt, Fred Roberts, Andy Toolson, Andre Turner.
Lega Basket All-Stars POLTI (Coaches: Alberto Bucci, Fabrizio Frates): Joe Binion, Dejan Bodiroga, Sasha Danilović, Sasha Đjorđjević, Winston Garland, Dean Garrett, Dan Gay, Shelton Jones, Cliff Levingston, George McCloud, Micheal Ray Richardson, Henry Williams.

3rd ULEB All-Star Game 1994–95
Pavelló Municipal Font de Sant Lluís, Valencia, November 14, 1994: Lega Basket All-Stars - LNB All-Stars 58–54
Pavelló Municipal Font de Sant Lluís, Valencia, November 14, 1994: Liga ACB All-Stars - LNB All-Stars 59–43
Pavelló Municipal Font de Sant Lluís, Valencia, November 14, 1994: Lega Basket All-Stars - Liga ACB All-Stars 53–48
Lega Basket All-Stars (Coaches: Alberto Bucci, Bogdan Tanjević): Wendell Alexis, Joe Binion, Dejan Bodiroga, Dallas Comegys, Emanual Davis, Sasha Đjorđjević, Dan Gay, Gerald Glass, Billy McCaffrey, Petar Naumoski, Jeff Sanders, John Turner.
Liga ACB All-Stars (Coaches: Aíto García Reneses, Manu Moreno): Darrell Armstrong, Michael Curry, Roy Fisher, Dan Godfread, Kenny Green, Warren Kidd, Darryl Middleton, Oscar Schmidt, Corny Thompson, Andy Toolson, Andre Turner.
LNB All-Stars (Coaches: Božidar Maljković, Jacques Monclar): Ron Anderson, Winston Crite, Ron Curry, Tim Kempton, Conrad McRae, David Rivers, Michael Ray Richardson, Delaney Rudd, Rickie Winslow, Michael Young.

== Scoresheets (1995–2003) ==
- 1st All-Star Game 1985–86:

DATE: January 2, 1986
VENUE: Don Benito
SCORE: Winston (Odd) 103 – Lee (Even) 97

Winston (Manuel Comas): Joan Creus, George Singleton, Robinson, Epi, David Russell, Knego, Paco Velasco, Carlos Montes, Brian Jackson, Costa, Collins, Davis, Andres Jimenez, Mike Phillips

Lee (Aíto García Reneses): Orlando Phillips, Jordi Villacampa, José Antonio Montero, Willie Jones, Chuck Aleksinas, Rafael Jofresa, Pou, John Pinone, Caldwell, José Luis Llorente

- 2nd All-Star Game 1986–87:

DATE: 1987
VENUE: Vigo
SCORE: Winston (Odd) Team 102 – Lee (Even) Team 101

Winston : Andres Jimenez, Epi, Joan Creus, David Russell and Eugene McDowell, Otis Howard, Manel Sánchez

Lee: Jordi Villacampa, José Antonio Montero, Chicho Sibilio, Salva Díez, Brad Branson and José Biriukov, Claude Riley, Joe Kopicki

- 3d All-Star Game 1988–89:

DATE: 27 November 1988
VENUE: Zaragoza
SCORE: Selection A-1 104 – Selection A-2 87

Selection A-1 (Aíto García Reneses): Leon Wood, Michael Young, Brian Jackson, Goran Grbovic, Tom Sheehey, Granger Hall, Reggie Johnson, Larry Micheaux, Audie Norris, Mel Turpin.

Selection A-2 (Javeir Casero): Brad Branson, Mike Schlegel, Anicet Lavodrama, Mike Smith, Ray Smith, Todd Murphy, Jimmy Wright, Lance Berwald, Ricky Brown, Claude Riley, Lemone Lampley.

- 4th All-Star Game 1989–90:

DATE: December 1989
VENUE: Polideportivo Lobete, Logrono
SCORE: Rioja Calidad 105 – Winston All Star 100 (aet 94-94)

Rioja Calidad : Mark Davis 23, Rickie Winslow 25, Joan Creus 5, John Pinone 9, Mike Schiegel 5, Salva Díez 6, Dallas Comegys 8, Mike Davis 8, Wallace Bryant 8, Alberto Herreros 8

Winston All Star : Ignacio Solozábal 18, Anicet Lavodrama 7, George Singleton 10, Brian Jackson 18, Rafael Jofresa 2, Ramón Rivas 6, Epi 5, Mike Smith 3, Ralph McPherson 13, Larry Micheaux 18

- 5th All-Star Game 1990–91:

DATE: 1990
VENUE: Zaragoza
SCORE: Lee (Even) 128 – Winston (Odd) 112

Lee (Aíto García Reneses): Walter Berry, José Antonio Montero, Chicho Sibilio, Joe Arlauckas, George Singleton, Piculin Ortiz - Manel Bosch, Brian Jackson, Alberto Herreros, Brad Branson, Shelton Jones

Winston (Lolo Sainz): Mark Davis, Corny Thompson, Audie Norris, Rickie Winslow, Joan Creus, Mike Schiegel, Ken Johnson, Tomás Jofresa, Kevin Magee, Pablo Laso - Ramón Rivas

- 9th All-Star Game 1995–96:

DATE: 12 November 1995
VENUE: Pavello Girona-Fontajau, Girona
SCORE: Spanish Combination 91 – Foreign Combination 96

Extranos (Javier Imbroda and Joaquín Costa): Keith Jennings, Michael Anderson, Sergei Babkov, John Morton, Martin, Joe Arlauckas, Mike Ansley, Zoran Savic, Deon Thomas, Brad Sellers, Andrei Fetisov, Chandler Thomspon, Glen Whisby, Tony Smith

Espana Nacional (Lolo Sainz): Alberto Herreros, Alfonso Reyes, Antonio Morales, Fran Murcia, Roger Estreller, Alberto Angulo, Nacho Rodriguez.
*Manuel Bosch and Xavi Fernandez were injured.

- 10th All-Star Game 1996–97:

DATE: 24 November 1996
VENUE:, Caceres
SCORE: Spanish Combination 87 – Foreign Combination 80

Espana Nacional (Lolo Sainz): Rafael Jofresa, Juan Antonio Orenga, Alberto Angulo, Jose Paraiso, Alfonso Reyes, Lucio Angulo, Nacho Rodriguez, Alberto Herreros, Roberto Duenas, Mike Smith, Xavi Fernandez, Ricardo Guillén

Extranos: Dejan Bodiroga, Arturas Karnisovas, Frankie King, Rod Sellers, Mike Ansley, Chandler Thompson, Aaron Awinson, LaBradford Smith, John Morton, Andrei Fetisov.

- Fetisov did not play as they were prepared with national teams.

- 11th All-Star Game 1997–98:

DATE: 24 November 1997
VENUE: Granada
SCORE: Spanish Combination 94 – Foreign Combination 99

Espana (Lolo Sainz): Alberto Herreros, Roger Esteller, Carlos Jimenez, Azofra, Nacho Rodriguez, Alberto Angulo, Jose Paraiso, Nacho Romero, Juan Antonio Orenga, Nacho Rodilla, Junyent, Ignacio De Miguel

Extranjero Combinado: Andre Turner, Chandler Thompson, Dejan Bodiroga, Aaron Swinson, Buck Johnson, Tanoka Beard, Glen Whisby, Bob Harstad, Payne, Derrick Alston, Scott, Washington, Brent Scott.

- 12th All-Star Game 1998–99:

DATE: 1998
VENUE: Pavello Nou Congost, Murcia
SCORE: Spanish Combination 96– Foreign Combination 99

Espana : Alberto Herreros, Alberto Angulo, Alfonso Reyes, Nacho Rodriguez, Roberto Duenas, Jose Paraiso, Nacho Romero, Ivan Corrales

Extranjero Combinado: Andre Turner, Chandler Thompson, Dejan Bodiroga, Aaron Swinson, Velimir Perasovic, Richard Scott, Bob Harstad, Larry Stewart, Gaylon Nickerson

- 13th All-Star Game 1999–00:

DATE: 14 November 1999
VENUE: Pavello Nou Congost, Manresa
SCORE: Spanish Combination 79 – Foreign Combination 88

Espana (Lolo Sainz): Alberto Herreros 24, Alberto Angulo 5, Alfonso Reyes 6, Nacho Rodriguez 4, Roberto Duenas, Jose Paraiso, Nacho Romero, Ivan Corrales, Jorge Garbajosa, Carlos Jimenez, Juan Carlos Navarro, Raúl López

Extranjero Combinado: Andre Turner, Aleksandar Djordjevic, Milan Gurovic, Velimir Perasovic, Tanoka Beard, Bernard Hopkins, Mills, Nate Higgs, Anthony Goldwire, Danya Abrams, Jorge Racca, Larry Stewart, Veljko Mrsic

- 14th All-Star Game 2000-01:

DATE: 27 January 2001
VENUE: Palacio Martin Carpena, Málaga
SCORE: Spanish Combination 78 – Foreign Combination 91

Espana Rodilla 10, Juan Carlos Navarro 6, Carlos Jimenez 6, Alfonso Reyes 21, Salvador Guardia 7; Rodriguez 1, Raul Lopez 10, De la Fuente, Paco Vazquez 8, Iturbe 6, Felipe Reyes 3, German Gabriel

Extranjero Combinado: Aleksandar Djordjevic 7, Perasovic 5, Karnisovas 12, Struelens 6, Derrick Alston 10; Bernard Hopkins 11, Bramlett, Richard Scott 2, Stombergas 13, Veljko Mrsic 7, Sarunas Jasikevicius 15, Mustafa Sonko, David Wood 2.

- 15th All-Star Game 2001-02:

DATE: 28 December 2002
VENUE: Pabellon Pisuerga, Valladolid
SCORE: North Team 105 – South Team 112

North Bennett 2, Juan Carlos Navarro 22, Arturas Karnisovas 8, Tanoka Beard 26, Okulaja 10; Keefe 14, Davis 5, Victoriano 4, Marco 3, Alex Mumbru 11

South: Carlos Cabezas, Milan Gurovic 24, Velimir Perasovic, 16, Derrick Alston 16, Zan Tabak 11; Mustafa Sonko 22, Scott 8, Granger 12, Reyes, Dusan Vukcevic 3

- 16th All-Star Game 2002-03:

DATE:
VENUE: Pabellon Pedro Ferrandez, Alicante
SCORE: North Team 100 – South Team 103

North: Louis Bullock 15, Roe 15, Scott 14, Lewis 13, Walter Herrmann 12, Pablo Prigioni 12, Felipe Reyes 8, Carlos Jimenez 8, Slanina 6, Victoriano

South: Williams 15, Luis Scola 14, Dejan Bodiroga 14, Sarunas Jasikevicius 14, Andres Nocioni 12, Davis 11, Juan Carlos Navarro 8, Zan Tabak 6, Marco 4, Yebra 2

== Players with most all-star game appearances (1986–2003) ==
| Player | All-Star Game Appearances | Liga ACB Stars Match | ULEB All-Star Game | All-Star Game MVP |
|---|---|---|---|---|
| (Spain) Alfonso Reyes | 6× | 1995, 1996, 1998, 1999, 2001, 2001 (II) | - | 1998, 2001 |
| (Spain) Alberto Herreros | 6× | 1989, 1990, 1995, 1997, 1998, 1999 | - | 1995, 1999 |
| (United States) Andre Turner | 6× | 1997, 1998, 1999 | 1992, 1993, 1994 | - |
| (Croatia) Velimir Perasović | 5× | 1992, 1998, 1999, 2001, 2001 (II) | - | - |
| (Spain) Alberto Angulo | 5× | 1995, 1996, 1997, 1998, 1999 | - | - |
| (United States) Rickie Winslow | 5× | 1989, 1990, 1991, 1992, 1994 | - | - |
| (Spain) Chichi Creus | 5× | 1986, 1987, 1989, 1990, 1991 | - | - |
| (Spain) Epi | 4× | 1986, 1987, 1989, 1991 | - | - |

== Distinctions ==
Including the ACB Selection for the ULEB All-Star Game.

=== FIBA Hall of Fame ===
- (Brazil) Oscar Schmidt
- (Lithuania) Arvydas Sabonis
- (Puerto Rico) Piculin Ortiz
- (Spain) Epi

=== Basketball Hall of Fame ===
- (Brazil) Oscar Schmidt
- (Lithuania) Arvydas Sabonis

=== FIBA's 50 Greatest Players (1991) ===
- (Brazil) Oscar Schmidt
- (Lithuania) Arvydas Sabonis
- (United States) (Spain) Clifford Luyk (As a player)

=== ULEB Euroleague Hall of Fame ===
- (Spain) Juan Carlos Navarro
- (Lithuania) Šarūnas Jasikevičius
- (Spain) Felipe Reyes

== See also ==
- Liga ACB Presentation Games
- Liga de Verano ACB

== Sources ==
- All the Games on Eurobasket
