= Lega Basket All Star Game =

Italian all-star basketball game

Lega Basket All-Star Game
- Status: Inactive
- Inaugurated: 1982
- Most recent: 2016
- Organizer: Lega Basket

The Lega Basket All Star Game, also commonly known as the Italian Basketball All-Star Game, is an all-star game that organised annually by the Lega Basket, in conjunction with RCS Sport and the Italian Basketball Federation. It brings together a selection of players from the Lega Basket Serie A (LBA), which is the highest-tier level professional basketball league in Italy, to play between themselves, or against another opponent. First held in 1982, the event has seen a fluctuating history, with numerous changes to its format through the years, including the participation of the senior men's Italian national team.

Starting with the 2016–17 season, the annual edition of the All-Star Game was not held.

== History ==
The Italian Basketball Federation organised an All-Star Game in 1980, to celebrate the Italian national team's silver medal at the 1980 Summer Olympics. The first official All-Star Game, which was held on 12 May 1982, was organised by the Lega Basket, which is the entity responsible for organizing the top two professional leagues in Italy, the first-tier level Serie A and the second-tier level Serie A2. Two teams from the respective divisions and the coaches, were chosen by the public, at the league's games, a few weeks before the all-star game, which was held at the Palasport di San Siro in Milan.

For the November 1992 edition, the event was named the ULEB All-Star Game, and it was organised in partnership with the Spanish ACB League's organizing body, the ACB. A squad from each league competed in the game, which was held in Madrid. The formula was repeated the next year, that time in Rome. The 1994 edition of the ULEB All-Star Game, also featured a team of the top-tier level French Pro A League's LNB All-Stars. The three squads, which were mostly made up of foreign players, played each other in games of a single 20 minute quarter, in Valencia's Fuente de San Luis.

The senior men's Italian national team has participated in a number of All-Star Games. Originally, the squad of Serie A based players was very similar to the main squad, with only one player (the Spain-based Nikola Radulović) from the 2003 EuroBasket bronze medal team absent for the December 2003 edition. In later editions, with the departure of a number of players abroad (to the NBA for example), the Italian squads were more experimental, and consisted mostly of reserve team players and promising young players.

The 2014 and 2015 editions saw the absence of EA7 Emporio Armani Milano players, as the club was involved in EuroLeague games during the same period. In November 2016, Lega Basket canceled the All-Star Game for the 2016–17 LBA season. That was decided by the General Meeting of the LBA clubs, which met in Bologna, at the headquarters of the Lega Basket. According to Lega Basket's president, Egidio Bianchi, the Lega Basket was unable to produce an interesting format under which to hold the All-Star Game.

== Editions ==
Season	Date	Location	Result	MVP
1981–82	12 May 1982	Palasport di San Siro, Milan	A2 Caselli 133–125 A1 Tempest	(Italy) Mike D'Antoni / (United States) Abdul Jeelani
1982–83	9 February 1983	Caserta	A1 Ocean Star 137–121 A2 Malaguti	(United States) Clyde Bradshaw
1983–84	29 February 1984	Treviso	A1 S.O.S. 140–127 A2 Tempest	(United States) Stan Pietkiewicz
1984–85	13 February 1985	Florence	A1 Liberti 149–143 A2 Nuova Stampa	(United States) Joe Bryant
1985–86	18 December 1985	Rome	A2 E.M.M. 120–112 A1 Riccadonna	(United States) Joe Bryant (2)
1986–87	17 December 1986	Rome	A1 Reebok 177–147 A2 Reebok	-
1987–88	21 November 1987	Rome	A1 Reebok 157–154 A2 Reebok	(Brazil) Oscar Schmidt
1988–89	26 November 1988	Rome	A1 Reebok 167–143 A2 Reebok	(United States) Micheal Ray Richardson
1989–90	25 November 1989	Rome	South Reebok 178–166 North Reebok	(United States) Wes Matthews
1990–91	1 December 1990	Rome	South Paluani 182–176 North Paluani	(United States) Michael Cooper
1991–92	16 November 1991	Rome	Italy 136–122 Paluani All-Stars	(Socialist Federal Republic of Yugoslavia) Dino Rađa
1992–93 (ULEB Edition)	14 November 1992	Madrid	All-Stars of Spain Fiat 136–123 All-Stars of Italy Polti	(Lithuania) Arvydas Sabonis (ACB All-Stars)
1993–94 (ULEB Edition)	13 November 1993	Rome	All-Stars of Italy Polti 135–131 All-Stars of Spain	(United States) Micheal Ray Richardson (2) (Lega All-Stars)
1994–95 (ULEB Edition)	14 November 1994	Fuente de San Luis, Valencia	All-Stars of Italy 58–54 All-Stars of France; All-Stars of Spain 59–43 All-Stars of France; All-Stars of Italy 53–48 All-Stars of Spain	(Federal Republic of Yugoslavia) Aleksandar Đorđević (Lega All-Stars)
1995–96	24 February 1996	Rome	Bostik All-Stars 113–112 Italy	(United States) Orlando Woolridge
1996–97	22 February 1997	Pesaro	Bostik All-Stars 131–127 Italy	(United States) (Italy) Mike Iuzzolino
1997–98	30 November 1997	Florence	Bostik All-Stars 121–116 Italy	(United States) Thurl Bailey
1998–99	29 November 1998	Naples	Bison All-Stars 167–145 Uhu All-Stars	(Italy) Vincenzo Esposito
1999–00	27 November 1999	PalaMalaguti, Casalecchio di Reno	Italy 99–81 Champion All-Stars	(Italy) Andrea Meneghin
2000–01	25 January 2001	PalaTrieste, Trieste	Italy 101–83 Champion All-Stars	(Italy) Gregor Fučka
2003–04	13 December 2003	PalaFiumara, Genoa	All-Stars 106–99 Italy	(United States) Maurice Evans
2004–05	11 December 2004	PalaRuffini, Turin	Italy 100–98 All-Stars	(United States) James Singleton
2005–06	11 December 2005	PalaMalaguti, Casalecchio di Reno	AIL All-Star 112–101 Quadrifoglio Verde All-Star	(Italy) Carlton Myers
2006–07	23 December 2006	PalaRuffini, Turin	Italy 96–73 Champion All-Stars	(Italy) Massimo Bulleri
2010–11	13 March 2011	Mediolanum Forum, Milan	Italy 90–88 All-Stars	(Italy) Stefano Mancinelli
2011–12	11 March 2012	Adriatic Arena, Pesaro	Italy 91–85 All-Stars	(Italy) Daniel Hackett
2012–13	16 December 2012	BiellaForum, Biella	Italy 107–92 All-Stars	(Italy) Stefano Gentile
2013–14	13 April 2014	PalaRossini, Ancona	Italy 76–59 All-Stars	(Italy) Stefano Gentile (2)
2014–15	17 January 2015	PalaOlimpia, Verona	Named Sport Team 146–143 Dolomiti Energia Team	(Democratic Republic of the Congo) Christian Eyenga
2015–16	10 January 2016	PalaTrento, Trento	Cavit Team 154–148 Dolomiti Energia Team	(United States) Alex Kirk
2016–17	Not held			
2017–18	Not held			

=== Players with most MVP awards ===
Player	Wins	Editions
(United States) Joe Bryant	2	1985, 1986
(United States) Micheal Ray Richardson	2	1988, 1994 (ULEB Edition)

== ULEB All-Star Game score sheets (1992–1994) ==
1st ULEB All-Star Game 1992–93
Palacio de los Deportes, Madrid, November 14, 1992: Liga ACB All-Stars - Lega Basket All-Stars 136–123
Liga ACB All-Stars FIAT (Coaches: Miguel Ángel Martín Fernández, Lolo Sainz): Joe Arlauckas, Tim Burroughs, Darryl Middleton, Velimir Perasović, Harold Pressley, Kevin Pritchard, Arvydas Sabonis, Bogdan Tanjević, Reggie Slater, Chandler Thompson, Andre Turner, Rickie Winslow.
Lega Basket All-Stars POLTI (Coaches: Alberto Bucci, Ettore Messina): Greg "Cadillac" Anderson, Sasha Danilović, Darryl Dawkins, Darren Daye, Sasha Đjorđjević, A.J. English, Pace Mannion, Oscar Schmidt, Dino Rađja, Terry Teagle, Sasha Volkov, Haywoode Workman.

2nd ULEB All-Star Game 1993–94
PalaEur, Rome, November 13, 1993: Lega Basket All-Stars - Liga ACB All-Stars 135–131
Liga ACB All-Stars (Coaches: Clifford Luyk, José Alberto Pesquera): Michael Anderson, Joe Arlauckas, Roy Fisher, Dan Godfread, Dennis Hopson, Tony Massenburg, Darryl Middleton, Ivo Nakić, Oscar Schmidt, Fred Roberts, Andy Toolson, Andre Turner.
Lega Basket All-Stars POLTI (Coaches: Alberto Bucci, Fabrizio Frates): Joe Binion, Dejan Bodiroga, Sasha Danilović, Sasha Đjorđjević, Winston Garland, Dean Garrett, Dan Gay, Shelton Jones, Cliff Levingston, George McCloud, Micheal Ray Richardson, Henry Williams.

3rd ULEB All-Star Game 1994–95
Pavelló Municipal Font de Sant Lluís, Valencia, November 14, 1994: Lega Basket All-Stars - LNB All-Stars 58–54
Pavelló Municipal Font de Sant Lluís, Valencia, November 14, 1994: Liga ACB All-Stars - LNB All-Stars 59–43
Pavelló Municipal Font de Sant Lluís, Valencia, November 14, 1994: Lega Basket All-Stars - Liga ACB All-Stars 53–48
Lega Basket All-Stars (Coaches: Alberto Bucci, Bogdan Tanjević): Wendell Alexis, Joe Binion, Dejan Bodiroga, Dallas Comegys, Emanual Davis, Sasha Đjorđjević, Dan Gay, Gerald Glass, Billy McCaffrey, Petar Naumoski, Jeff Sanders, John Turner.
Liga ACB All-Stars (Coaches: Aíto García Reneses, Manu Moreno): Darrell Armstrong, Michael Curry, Roy Fisher, Dan Godfread, Kenny Green, Warren Kidd, Darryl Middleton, Oscar Schmidt, Corny Thompson, Andy Toolson, Andre Turner.
LNB All-Stars (Coaches: Božidar Maljković, Jacques Monclar): Ron Anderson, Winston Crite, Ron Curry, Tim Kempton, Conrad McRae, David Rivers, Michael Ray Richardson, Delaney Rudd, Rickie Winslow, Michael Young.

== Three-Point Contest ==
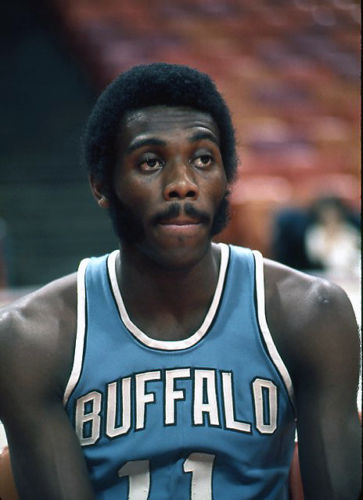
Bob McAdoo won the three-point shootout contest in 1986.

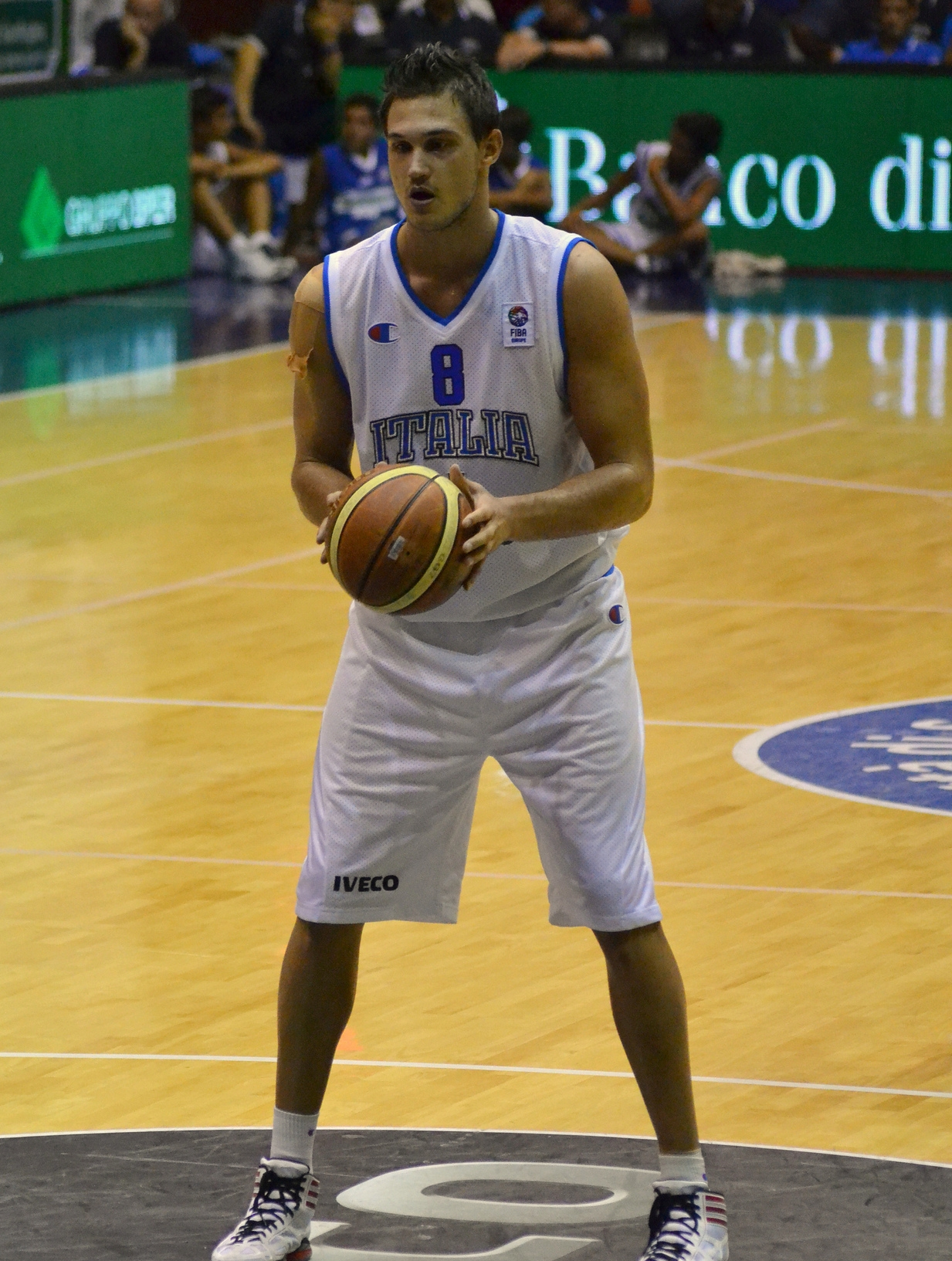
Danilo Gallinari won the three-point shootout contest in 2006.

The Three-point contest (Italian: gara del tiro da tre punti), known as the Festina Three Points Contest for sponsorship reasons, was first organised during the December 1986 edition of the all-star game. Oscar Schmidt is the record-holder with four wins in total. He won the Italian League's contest three times (1987, 1988, 1989), and also won it once as a member of the Spanish League All-Star team, during the 1993 All-Star Game 3-Point Contest, which was held between the Spanish League's All-Stars and the Italian League's All-Stars. He also added an unofficial title in December 2003, after he beat the competition's official winner Michele Mian, in an extra contest after the official one.

The latest edition to date (2015), saw the contestants try to score as many three-point field goals as possible, from five shooting positions around the three-point line. With each position consisting of a rack with four balls worth three-points, and a special "Money Ball" worth six; for a total of twenty five shots in one minute, with the highest score crowning the winner.

Results
Season	Winner	Runner-up
1986–87	(United States) Bob McAdoo	-
1987–88	(Brazil) Oscar Schmidt	-
1988–89	(Brazil) Oscar Schmidt (2)	-
1989–90	(Brazil) Oscar Schmidt (3)	-
1990–91	(United States) Michael Cooper	-
1991–92	(Italy) Alessandro Fantozzi	-
1992–93 (ULEB Edition)	(Croatia) Danko Cvjetićanin (ACB All-Stars)	-
1993–94 (ULEB Edition)	(Brazil) Oscar Schmidt (4) (ACB All-Stars)	-
1994–95 (ULEB Edition)	(Federal Republic of Yugoslavia) Aleksandar Đorđević (Lega All-Stars)	-
1995–96	(United States) Steve Henson	-
1996–97	(Italy) Alessandro Abbio	-
1997–98	(United States) Henry Williams	-
1998–99	(United States) Steve Burtt	-
1999–00	(Italy) Alessandro Abbio (2)	-
2000–01	(Italy) Giacomo Galanda	-
2003–04	(Italy) Michele Mian	(United States) Matt Bonner
2004–05	(Italy) Giacomo Galanda (2)	-
2005–06	(Italy) Dante Calabria	-
2006–07	(Italy) Danilo Gallinari	-
2010–11	(Uruguay) Nicolás Mazzarino	-
2011–12	(Italy) Travis Diener	(Italy) Jeff Viggiano
2012–13	(Italy) Carlton Myers	-
2013–14	(United States) Drake Diener	-
2014–15	(Canada) Andy Rautins	(Italy) Marco Spanghero
2015–16	(Croatia) Krunoslav Simon	(United States) Tyrus McGee
2016–17	Not held	
2017–18	Not held	

== Slam dunk contest ==
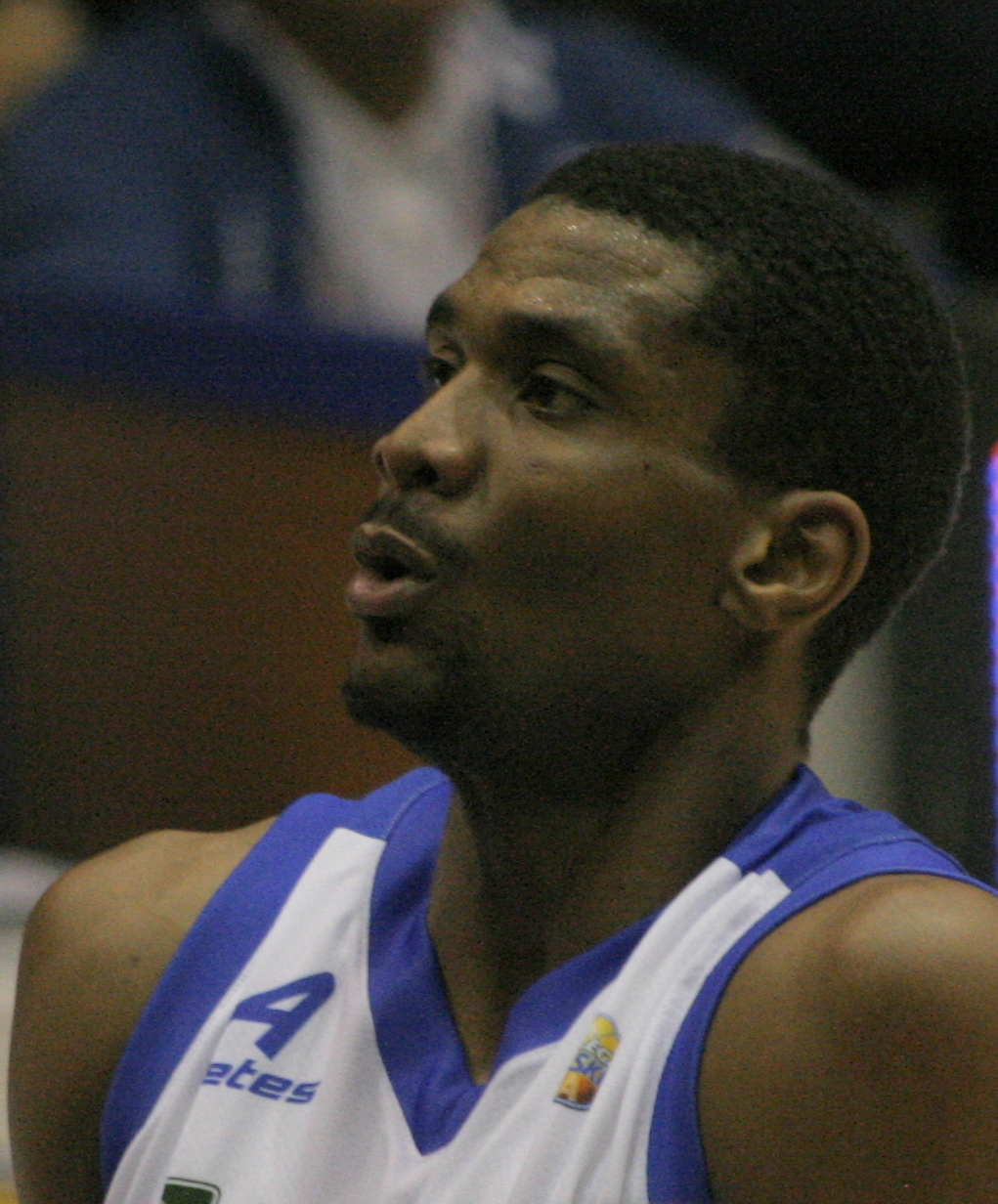
James White, two-time winner of the slam dunk contest (2011, 2012).

The slam dunk contest (Italian: gara delle schiacciate), known as the Openjobmetis Slam Dunk Contest for sponsorship reasons, was first organised by Spain's Liga ACB during the November 1992 and 1994 editions played in that country. The first time it was organised by the Lega Basket was during the December 2005 edition, dunk specialist James White is the record-holder with two wins (Chandler Thompson won both ACB editions).

White refused to defend his title in 2014, having decided to retire from dunk contests following his last place in the 2013 NBA Slam Dunk Contest. It formerly saw the contestants each have two dunk attempts, with the pair performing the best judged dunks reaching the final, where another couple of attempts crowned the winner. The 2015 edition saw the contestants separated into two teams, consisting of players DeQuan Jones and Tony Mitchell each paired with a member of the Da Move freestyle group, whose five attempts each were judged by a panel of experts and the public

Results
Season	Winner	Runner-up
1992–93 (ULEB Edition)	(United States) Chandler Thompson (ACB All-Stars)	(United States) Antonio Davis
1994–95 (ULEB Edition)	(United States) Chandler Thompson (2) (ACB All-Stars)	(United States) Darrell Armstrong
2005–06	(United States) Pervis Pasco	-
2006–07	(United States) Paul McPherson	-
2010–11	(United States) James White	-
2011–12	(United States) James White (2)	(United States) Aubrey Coleman
2012–13	(Italy) Tommaso Raspino	-
2013–14	(Italy) Achille Polonara	-
2014–15	(United States) Tony Mitchell	(United States) DeQuan Jones
2015–16	(Italy) Awudu Abass	(United States) Micah Downs / (United States) Trent Lockett
2016–17	Not held	
2017–18	Not held	

== Players with most appearances ==
Player	All-Star	Lega Basket	ULEB Editions	MVP	Notes
(Brazil) Oscar Schmidt	10 (1 ULEB)	1983–1991	1992	1987	1× FIBA European Selection
(United States) (Italy) Dan Gay	8 (2 ULEB)	1985, 1986, 1987, 1990, 1996, 1997	1993, 1994	-	
(United States) Joe Bryant	6	1985, 1985, 1986, 1987, 1988, 1990		1985, 1986	
(United States) Micheal Ray Richardson	5 (2 ULEB)	1988, 1989, 1990	1993, 1994	1988, 1994	4× NBA All-Star
(United States) Henry Williams	5 (1 ULEB)	1996, 1997, 1997, 1999	1993	-	
(Slovenia) (Italy) Gregor Fucka	5	1991, 1996, 1997, 1999, 2001		2001	2× FIBA EuroStar
(Italy) Roberto Chiacig	5	1996, 1997, 1999, 2003, 2004	-		
(Italy) Gianmarco Pozzecco	5	1997, 1997, 1998, 2001, 2004	-		
(Italy) Alessandro Abbio	5	1996, 1997, 1998, 1999, 2001	-		1× FIBA EuroStar
(Italy) Massimo Bulleri	5	2001, 2003, 2004, 2005, 2006	-		
(Italy) Denis Marconato	5	1997, 1998, 1999, 2001, 2003	-		
(Serbia) Predrag Danilović	5 (2 ULEB)	1997, 1998, 1999	1992, 1993	-	2× FIBA EuroStar
(United States) Mike Mitchell	4	1988, 1989, 1996, 1997	-	-	1× NBA All-Star
(United States) Pace Mannion	4 (1 ULEB)	1989, 1990, 1991	1992	-	
(Italy) Riccardo Pittis	4	1991, 1996, 1997, 1999	-		
(Italy) Matteo Soragna	4	2003, 2004, 2005, 2006	-		
(Italy) Gianluca Basile	4	1997, 1999, 2003, 2004	-		
(United States) Mitchell Anderson	4	1986, 1987, 1988, 1990	-	-	
(Italy) Carlton Myers	3	1996, 1997, 2005	-	2005	3× FIBA EuroStar
(United States) Warren Kidd	3	1997, 1998, 1999	-	-	
(Italy) Andrea Meneghin	3	1997, 1997, 1999		1999	2× FIBA EuroStar
(Italy) Andrea Cinciarini	3	2011, 2014, 2015	-		
(Italy) Angelo Gigli	3	2004, 2005, 2006	-		
(United States) (Italy) Mike Iuzzolino	3	1996, 1997, 1998		1997	
(Italy) Nicolo Melli	3	2011, 2012, 2013	-		
(Italy) Alessandro Frosini	3	1996, 1997, 1997	-		
(Italy) Alex Righetti	3	2001, 2003, 2004	-		
(Italy) Davide Bonora	3	1996, 1997, 1998	-		
(Serbia) Aleksandar Đorđević	3 (3 ULEB)	-	1992, 1993, 1994	1994	1× FIBA EuroStar
(Argentina) Manu Ginóbili	3	1999, 2000, 2001	-	-	2× NBA All-Star
(United States) Wendell Alexis	3	1989, 1990, 1994	-	-	2× FIBA EuroStar
(United States) James White	3	2011, 2012, 2014	-		
(United States) Wallace Bryant	3	1983, 1987, 1990	-		

== Distinctions ==
Including the Lega Selection for the ULEB All-Star Game.

=== FIBA Hall of Fame ===
- (Italy) Pierluigi Marzorati
- (Italy) Dino Meneghin
- (Socialist Federal Republic of Yugoslavia) Dragan Kićanović
- (Brazil) Oscar Schmidt
- (Socialist Federal Republic of Yugoslavia) Dražen Dalipagić
- (Slovenia) Jure Zdovc
- (United States) Dan Peterson
- (Soviet Union) (Ukraine) Alexander Volkov
- (Angola) Antoine Rigaudeau
- (Socialist Federal Republic of Yugoslavia) Bogdan Tanjević
- (Italy) Ettore Messina

=== Basketball Hall of Fame ===
- (Brazil) Oscar Schmidt
- (Socialist Federal Republic of Yugoslavia) Dražen Dalipagić
- (United States) Bob McAdoo
- (Croatia) Dino Radja
- (United States) Dominique Wilkins
- (United States) Michael Cooper
- (United States) George Gervin
- (Argentina) Manu Ginóbili

=== FIBA's 50 Greatest Players (1991) ===
- (Italy) Dino Meneghin
- (Italy) Pierluigi Marzorati
- (Socialist Federal Republic of Yugoslavia) Dragan Kićanović
- (Brazil) Oscar Schmidt
- (Socialist Federal Republic of Yugoslavia) Dražen Dalipagić
- (Croatia) Dino Radja
- (Italy) Antonello Riva

=== Collegiate Basketball Hall of Fame ===
- (United States) George Gervin
- (United States) Dominique Wilkins
- (United States) Bob McAdoo

== Family Shootout ==
The Grundig sponsored Family Shootout was a one-off event that was organised during the April 2014 edition. It saw four pairs of current or former professional players from the same family, contest successive rounds of four shots from different positions. The father-son pair of Nando and Stefano Gentile, prevailed in the final over brothers Michele and Luca Vitali.

== Under-23 game ==
The December 2003 edition included a game played between mostly (but not exclusively) under-23 Italian players, in view of judging their potential as part of the 2005 Belgrade EuroBasket, project by the Italian national team's organisation. Andrea Michelori top-scored with 28 points in the game. Team Blues beat Team Whites, by a score of 90–72.
