= Mark Davis (basketball, born 1963) =

American basketball player (born 1963)

Personal information
- Born: June 8, 1963 (age 63) Chesapeake, Virginia, U.S.
- Listed height: 6 ft 6 in (1.98 m)
- Listed weight: 195 lb (88 kg)

Career information
- High school: Great Bridge (Chesapeake, Virginia)
- College: Old Dominion (1981–1985)
- NBA draft: 1985: 4th round, 79th overall pick
- Drafted by: Cleveland Cavaliers
- Playing career: 1985–1999
- Position: Small forward
- Number: 43, 23

Career history
- 1985–1986: Pensacola Tornados
- 1986–1987: Willebroek
- 1987–1988: La Crosse Catbirds
- 1988: Milwaukee Bucks
- 1988–1989: Phoenix Suns
- 1989: La Crosse Catbirds
- 1989: Milwaukee Bucks
- 1989–1991: CB Zaragoza
- 1991–1992: La Crosse Catbirds
- 1992–1994: Aurora Desio
- 1994: Sioux Falls Skyforce
- 1995: Teorematour Roma
- 1995–1996: Brescialat Gorizia
- 1996–1997: Daiwa Securities Hotblizzards
- 1997: Andino de La Rioja
- 1997–1998: FV Lugano
- 1998–1999: La Crosse Catbirds

Career highlights
- Spanish Cup winner (1990); Spanish All-Star Game MVP (1989); CBA champion (1992); All-CBA First Team (1992); All-CBA Second Team (1988)
- Stats at NBA.com
- Stats at Basketball Reference

Mark Giles Davis (born June 8, 1963) is an American former professional basketball player. He was a 6-foot-6-inch (1.98 m), 195 pounds (88 kg) small forward. He attended Great Bridge High School in Chesapeake, Virginia, where he was born. He played collegiately at Old Dominion University.

Davis was selected with the ninth pick of the fourth round of the 1985 NBA draft by the Cleveland Cavaliers. In his only NBA season (1988–89) in which he spent time with the Milwaukee Bucks (31 games) and Phoenix Suns (2 games), he averaged 3.8 points and 1.1 rebounds per game.

He won the Spanish Cup in 1990, playing for CB Zaragoza. He also played in 1991 European Cup Winner's Cup final.

One of Davis's sons, Johnny, was drafted 10th overall in the 2022 NBA draft by the Washington Wizards. Mark's other son, Jordan, originally played college basketball for the Wisconsin Badgers, before transferring to Illinois State.

== Career statistics ==
Legend
GP	Games played	GS	Games started	MPG	Minutes per game
FG%	Field goal percentage	3P%	3-point field goal percentage	FT%	Free throw percentage
RPG	Rebounds per game	APG	Assists per game	SPG	Steals per game
BPG	Blocks per game	PPG	Points per game	**Bold**	Career high

=== NBA ===
==== Regular season ====
Year	Team	GP	GS	MPG	FG%	3P%	FT%	RPG	APG	SPG	BPG	PPG
1988–89	Phoenix	2	0	3.5	.200	.000	**1.000**	.5	.0	.0	.0	2.0
1988–89	Milwaukee	**31**	0	**8.1**	**.495'**	**.111**	.813	**1.2**	**.5**	**.4**	**.2**	**4.0**
Career		33	0	7.8	.480	.100	.824	1.1	.4	.4	.2	3.8
