= Xavi Fernández =

Spanish basketball player

Personal information
- Born: 12 February 1968 (age 58) Barcelona, Spain
- Listed height: 1.94 m (6 ft 4 in)

Career information
- Playing career: 1987–2003
- Position: Small forward

Career history
- 1987-1988: Caixa Sabadell
- 1988-1989: Metro Santa Coloma
- 1989–1994: Elosúa León
- 1994–1999: FC Barcelona
- 1999-2000: Unicaja Málaga
- 2000–2001: Canarias Telecom
- 2001–2003: Casademont Girona

Career highlights
- Spanish All-Star Game MVP (1996)

Xavi Fernández (born 12 February 1968) a Spanish former professional basketball player. He competed in the men's tournament at the 1992 Summer Olympics.
