= Alberto Angulo =

Spanish basketball player

Personal information
- Born: 19 June 1970 Zaragoza, Spain
- Listed height: 1.96 m (6 ft 5 in)

Career information
- Playing career: 1989–2007
- Position: Shooting guard

Career history
- 1989–1990: Zaragoza
- 1990–1991: CajaBadajoz
- 1991–1992: León
- 1992–1996: CB Zaragoza
- 1996–2002: Real Madrid
- 2002–2005: Lleida Bàsquet
- 2005–2007: CAI Zaragoza

Career highlights
- FIBA Saporta Cup champion (1997); Spanish League champion (2000); Spanish Cup winner (1990); Spanish League Finals MVP (2000); 5× Spanish League All-Star (1995–1999); 5× Spanish League All-Star 3-Point Shoutout Champion (1999)
Medals
Men's basketball
Representing Spain
EuroBasket
Silver medal – second place	1999 France

Francisco Alberto Angulo Espinosa (born 19 June 1970, in Zaragoza, Spain) is a Spanish former professional basketball player and coach.

== Professional career ==
During his playing career, Angulo played at the shooting guard position. Angulo played with his local club Zaragoza, and with them, he won the Spanish Cup in 1990. He also played with Real Madrid and Lleida. With Real Madrid, he won the FIBA Saporta Cup championship in 1997, and the Spanish League championship in 2000, being the league's Finals MVP in the process.

== National team career ==
Angulo amassed a total of 98 caps with the senior men's Spanish national team. He played with Spain at the 1995 EuroBasket, the 1997 EuroBasket, and the 1998 FIBA World Cup. With Spain's national team, he won the silver medal at the 1999 EuroBasket, in France. He also played with Spain at the 2000 Sydney Summer Olympics.

== Coaching career ==
After he retired from playing pro club basketball, Angulo worked as a basketball coach.

== Personal life ==
Angulo's younger brother Lucio, was also a professional basketball player.
