= List of NBA single-season steals per game leaders =

NBA Statistics Page

This list exhibits the National Basketball Association's top single-season steals averages based on at least 70 games played or 125 steals. The NBA did not record steals until 1973–74 NBA season.

== List ==
^	Active NBA player
*	Inducted into the Naismith Memorial Basketball Hall of Fame
†	Not yet eligible for Hall of Fame consideration
‡	Denotes season currently ongoing in 2025–26

Statistics accurate as of the 2025–26 NBA season.

Rank	Season	Player	Team	Games	Steals	SPG
1	1985–86	Alvin Robertson	San Antonio Spurs	82	301	3.67
2	1976–77	Don Buse	Indiana Pacers	81	281	3.47
3	1980–81	Magic Johnson*	Los Angeles Lakers	37	127	3.43
4	1979–80	Micheal Ray Richardson	New York Knicks	82	265	3.23
5	1986–87	Alvin Robertson (2)	San Antonio Spurs	81	260	3.21
6	1988–89	John Stockton*	Utah Jazz	82	263	3.21
7	1975–76	Slick Watts	Seattle SuperSonics	82	261	3.18
8	1987–88	Michael Jordan*	Chicago Bulls	82	259	3.16
9	1990–91	Alvin Robertson (3)	Milwaukee Bucks	81	246	3.04
10	1988–89	Alvin Robertson (4)	San Antonio Spurs	65	197	3.03
11	2024–25	Dyson Daniels^	Atlanta Hawks	76	229	3.01
12	1991–92	John Stockton* (2)	Utah Jazz	82	244	2.98
13	1984–85	Micheal Ray Richardson (2)	New Jersey Nets	82	243	2.96
13	1987–88	Alvin Robertson (5)	San Antonio Spurs	82	243	2.96
15	1993–94	Nate McMillan	Seattle SuperSonics	73	216	2.96
16	1987–88	John Stockton* (3)	Utah Jazz	82	242	2.95
17	1991–92	Micheal Williams	Indiana Pacers	79	233	2.95
18	1980–81	Micheal Ray Richardson (3)	New York Knicks	79	232	2.94
18	1994–95	Scottie Pippen*	Chicago Bulls	79	232	2.94
20	1993–94	Scottie Pippen* (2)	Chicago Bulls	72	211	2.93
21	1988–89	Michael Jordan* (2)	Chicago Bulls	81	234	2.89
22	2004–05	Larry Hughes	Washington Wizards	61	176	2.89
23	1986–87	Michael Jordan* (3)	Chicago Bulls	82	236	2.88
24	1990–91	John Stockton* (4)	Utah Jazz	82	234	2.85
25	1995–96	Gary Payton*	Seattle SuperSonics	81	231	2.85

== See also ==
- National Basketball Association
