= Whatever Happened to Micheal Ray? =

- Directed by: Larry Weitzman & Jim Podhoretz
- Written by: Larry Weitzman
- Produced by: NBA Entertainment
- Narrated by: Chris Rock
- Release date: 2000
- Country: United States
- Language: English

Whatever Happened to Micheal Ray?, is an American documentary produced in 2000 by NBA Entertainment about the rise and fall of All-Star point guard Micheal Ray Richardson. The film was written by Larry Weitzman and co-directed by Weltzman and Jim Podhoretz. The film is narrated by Chris Rock.

Rock, a native New Yorker, is entranced by the arrival of Micheal Ray Richardson on the New York sports scene. Richardson was a relatively unknown collegiate basketball player from the University of Montana—nicknamed "Sugar"—who had been drafted by the New York Knicks with the 4th overall pick in the 1978 NBA draft. According to the film documentary and first coach Willis Reed, Richardson could be compared favorably to Knick legend and man-about-town Walt Frazier ("Clyde"). In his rookie year, Richardson performed better off the court than on, but in his second year, blossomed into an All-Star, leading the NBA in both assists and steals and bearing a strong resemblance not only to Clyde, but to Earvin "Magic" Johnson, another tall and versatile point guard. Johnson tells us clearly how difficult it was to play against Richardson. Isiah Thomas, another contemporary superstar point guard, in the same vein says simply, "He was Sugar Ray, man. He was sweet."

Richardson was again an All-Star in his third year, 1980–81, but a poor performance by the Knicks in the playoffs that year led the team to trade Richardson's two closest friends on the team, Ray Williams and Mike Glenn, which in turn, according to the film, helped change the eager-to-please Richardson from a drug user to a drug abuser. Richardson found professional rejection difficult to accept; a particularly poignant anecdote comes from his first coach at Montana, Jud Heathcote. When Heathcote accepted the head coaching job at Michigan State, Richardson came to him in tears of disbelief asking whether the rumors of the coach's departure were true. Heathcote attempted to disabuse Richardson of the notion that he was like a father to the player. Richardson responded by telling Heathcote, "Coach, you have to remember, I don't have a father."

The Knicks and Richardson regressed together in 1981–82, and the Knicks traded Richardson to the Golden State Warriors at the beginning of the 1982–83 season.
