= Nate Higgs =

American-Spanish basketball player

Nathan Lee Higgs (born October 21, 1970) is an American/Spanish basketball player and coach.

== Personal information ==
Higgs is 6'7" tall. He graduated from Tarboro High School in Tarboro, North Carolina.

== College ==
Higgs played for the Elizabeth City State University (ECSU) Vikings basketball team in the Central Intercollegiate Athletic Association (CIAA). In 1992, 1993, and 1994, he was named to the all-conference team, and in 1993, he was named CIAA Player of the Year in 1993 and captained the all-conference team.

== Professional Career ==
In October 1994, Higgs passed over offers from Charlotte, Milwaukee, and Miami to sign with the Seattle SuperSonics basketball team as a forward-center. According to Higgs' agent, Seattle represented "the best basketball opportunity" and "the best economic deal".

Higgs went on to play in the CBA, being the second overall pick in the first round for the Omaha Racers.

- 1995 – signed as a free agent with the Vancouver (Memphis) Grizzlies and was again the last cut. From there, he played with the Yakima Sun Kings again in the CBA.
- 1996 – began European career with Uppsala Gators in Sweden where he went on to make a name for himself.
- 1997–98 – Played with Indepediente Argentina (Teammate of Andreas "Chapu" Nocioni Sacramento Kings NBA) and finished 3 in the South America Cup finalist, losing to Oscar Schmidt with Franco in Brazil.
- 1999–2000 – Won the Spanish ACB Slamdunk contest while averaging 13 points and 6 rebounds per contest in.

He has played in Italy, Greece, Israel, Argentina, France, Venezuela, Puerto Rico, Lebanon, and a total of over 20 countries worldwide. He is still active in the European and Spanish leagues and possesses dual citizenship. He was inducted in his university's Sports Hall of Fame at Elizabeth City State University on October 16, 2009.
