= Lucio Angulo =

Spanish basketball player

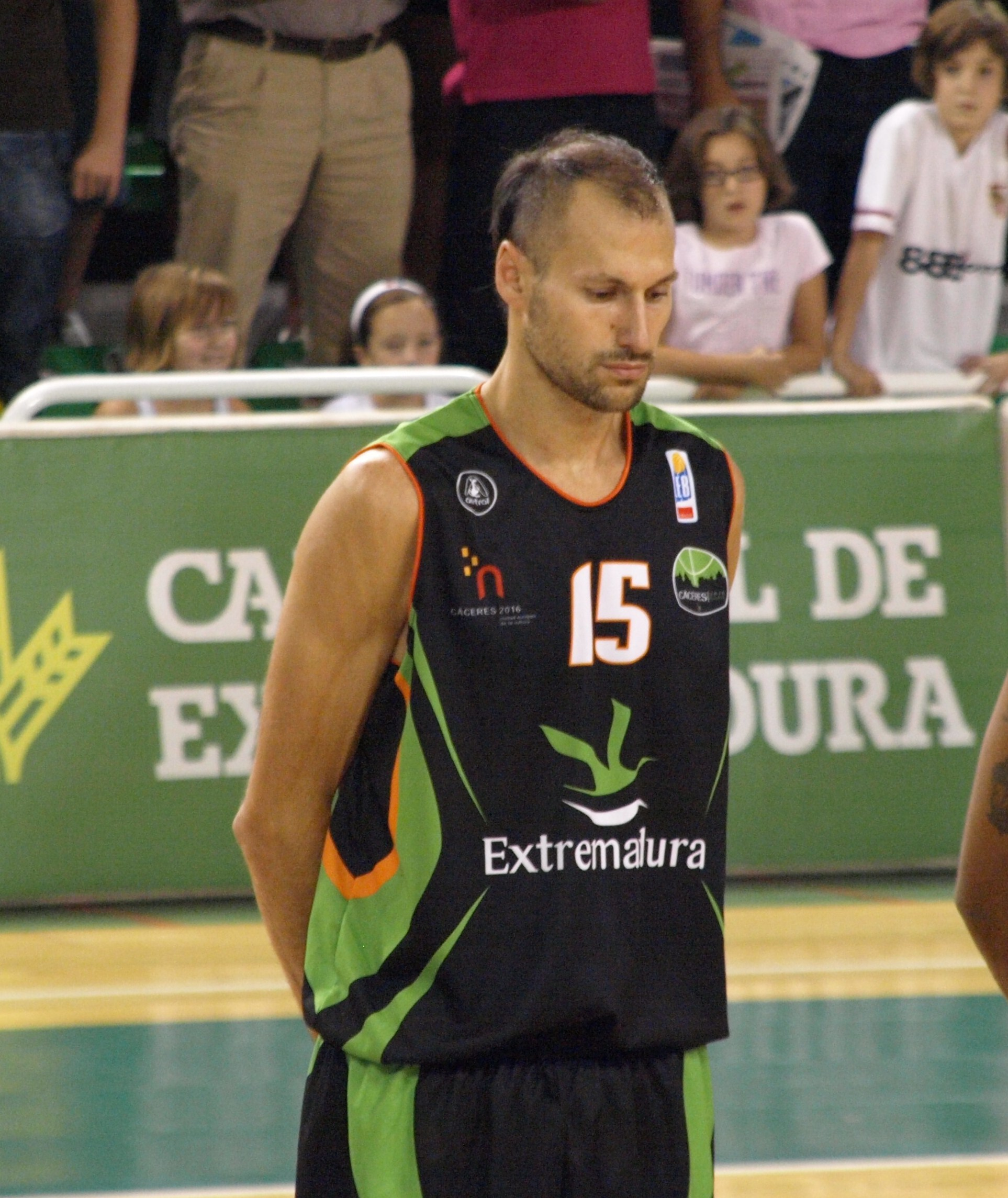

Personal information
- Born: 9 April 1973 (age 53) Zaragoza, Spain
- Listed height: 6 ft 6.75 in (2.00 m)
- Listed weight: 205 lb (93 kg)

Career information
- Playing career: 1992–2011
- Position: Small forward

Career history
- 1992–1993: Conservas Daroca
- 1993–1994: CB Peñas Huesca
- 1994–1996: CB Zaragoza
- 1996–1999: Saski Baskonia
- 1999–2003: Real Madrid
- 2003–2008: CB Lucentum Alicante
- 2008: Benetton Treviso
- 2008–2011: Cáceres Ciudad del Baloncesto
Medals
Men's basketball
Representing Spain
FIBA EuroBasket
Bronze medal – third place	2001 Turkey	Spain National Team

Lucio Angulo Espinosa (born 9 April 1973 in Zaragoza, Spain) is a retired Spanish professional basketball player. He is a 2.00 m (6 ft 6 ¾ in) tall small forward.

== Professional career ==
In 1996 he joined Saski Baskonia and in 1999 Real Madrid signed him after paying 80 million pesetas (500,000 euros) to Baskonia.

Angulo won the Spanish League championship, while playing with Real Madrid, and the Spanish Cup championship, while playing with Baskonia Vitoria.

== National team career ==
With the senior men's Spain national basketball team, Angulo played at the EuroBasket 2001, where Spain reached the semifinals, and finally won the bronze medal. He also played at the 2002 FIBA World Championship.

== Personal life ==
Angulo is the younger brother of Alberto Angulo, who played for Real Madrid, as Lucio also did.
