= Andy Toolson =

American basketball player (born 1966)

Personal information
- Born: January 19, 1966 (age 60) Chicago, Illinois, U.S.
- Listed height: 6 ft 6 in (1.98 m)
- Listed weight: 210 lb (95 kg)

Career information
- High school: Twin Falls (Twin Falls, Idaho)
- College: BYU (1984–1985, 1987–1990)
- NBA draft: 1990: undrafted
- Playing career: 1990–2001
- Position: Shooting guard / small forward
- Number: 5
- Coaching career: 2001–2005

Career history

Playing
- 1990–1991: Utah Jazz
- 1991–1992: Telemarket Brescia
- 1992–1993: Tri-City Chinook
- 1993–1994: Festina Andorra
- 1994–1995: Amway Zaragoza
- 1995–1996: Utah Jazz
- 1996: AEK Athens
- 1996–1998: Festina Joventut
- 1998–1999: Maroussi
- 1999: Girona Gavis
- 1999: Adecco Estudiantes
- 2000–2001: Casademont Girona

Coaching
- 2001–2005: BYU (assistant)

Career highlights
- Spanish Cup winner (1997); 2× Spanish League All-Star (1993, 1994); Greek League All-Star (1998); Greek All-Star Game 3-Point Shootout Champion (1998); First-team Academic All-American (1990)
- Stats at NBA.com
- Stats at Basketball Reference

Andrew Kent Toolson (born January 19, 1966) is an American retired professional basketball player. A 6-foot-6-inch (1.98 m) shooting guard-small forward, he played college basketball for the BYU Cougars

== Early life and college years ==
Born in Chicago, Andy Toolson was the fourth child of Bill and Elaine Toolson, owners of a drugstore; Bill was a dental student at the Loyola University School of Dentistry. Andy Toolson graduated from Twin Falls High School of Twin Falls, Idaho, in 1984 and attended Brigham Young University (BYU). With a .503 field goal percentage, Toolson was the third-leading scorer on the BYU Cougars men's basketball team as a freshman (1984–85) season with 8.5 points per game with a season-high 23 in a triple-overtime loss to UTEP. From 1985 to 1987, Toolson served an LDS mission in Concepción, Chile.

As a sophomore (1987–88), in 32 games (22 starts), Toolson averaged 6.0 points and 2.8 rebounds and made 43.0% of field goal attempts. Toolson improved to 15.3 points per game and 6.6 rebounds per game in 30 games (26 starts) in his junior season 1988–89 and won three WAC Player of the Week honors and Academic All-WAC honors. He reached a career-high 32 points against California. In the summer of 1989, Toolson worked as an intern in the office of U.S. Senator James A. McClure of Idaho.

In his senior year 1989–90, Toolson averaged 18.3 points and 6.6 rebounds in 30 games and was a first-team Academic All-America selection. As of 2012, Toolson still ranks as 3rd overall in 3-point shooting percentage (.437) at BYU. Toolson graduated from BYU with a Bachelor of Arts degree in international relations in 1990. In 1999, Toolson earned his Master of Arts degree in social science at Syracuse University.

== Professional playing career ==
Toolson was not selected in the 1990 NBA draft, but the Cedar Rapids Silver Bullets of the Continental Basketball Association (CBA) selected Toolson in the fifth round as the 81st overall pick in the 1990 CBA Draft. Toolson signed with the Utah Jazz as an undrafted free agent on October 1, 1990, and played 47 games with 15 starts as a small forward in the 1990–91 season. In each game he averaged 2.9 points, 1.4 rebounds, 0.7 assists, and 0.3 steals. Toolson played 10 games for Telemarket Brescia of the Italian league Legadue Basket in the 1991–92 season.

For the 1992–1993 season, Toolson played in the CBA with the Tri-City Chinook. He then played at Festina Andorra of the Spanish Liga ACB in the 1993–94 season and Amway Zaragoza of Liga ACB in 1994–95. He was a Liga ACB All-Start selection in 1993, and also in the ULEB edition of Spain's All-Star Game in 1994.

Returning to the Utah Jazz for the 1995–96 season, Toolson played 13 games, averaging 1.7 points, 0.5 rebounds, and 0.1 assists before being cut on January 23, 1996. Shortly afterwards, Toolson signed with AEK Athens of the Greek Basket League. Toolson then returned to Liga ACB and played two seasons with Festina Joventut from 1996 to 1998. Toolson was part of the Joventut 1996–97 Copa del Rey de Baloncesto championship team. For the 1998–99 season, Toolson played for Maroussi of the top-tier Greek league before being cut in January 1999. From February to April 1999, Toolson played for Girona Gavis of Liga ACB. He then signed with Adecco Estudiantes of Liga ACB the following season and was cut in November 1999. For his final season (2000–01), Toolson played for the Liga ACB team Casademont Girona.

== Post-playing career ==
=== Coaching ===
After his playing days Toolson was invited back to BYU as an assistant coach under Steve Cleveland. Toolson's primary responsibilities were recruiting, academics, offensive skill development, and game preparation. Toolson would serve as an assistant coach from 2001 to 2005.

=== Sports broadcasting ===
In 2006 Toolson joined KSL with Greg Wrubell to call BYU men's basketball games on the radio. He would serve as an analyst for KSL broadcasts for 3 seasons (2006–2009) when he would be replaced by Mark Durrant. In 2007 Toolson also began calling some TV men's basketball games for BYUtv Sports where he has called games with Dave McCann (2007, 2009–present), Jarom Jordan (1 game in 2009), Chris Twitty (2007), and Steve Brown (2008). In 2010 Toolson would sign a contract with the Mtn. where he has called games with Dan Gutowsky and Peter Young. He currently lives in Provo, Utah.

== Personal life ==
Andy's cousin Ryan is a professional basketball player.
