= Lega Basket =

Organizing body, as delegated by the Italian Basketball Federation

Lega Società di Pallacanestro Serie A
- Founded: 1970; 56 years ago
- Country: Italy
- Federation: FIP
- Confederation: FIBA Europe
- Number of teams: 16
- Level on pyramid: 1
- Relegation to: Serie A2
- Domestic cup: Coppa Italia
- Supercup: Supercoppa Italiana di Pallacanestro
- International cup(s): EuroLeague; EuroCup; Champions League
- Current champions: Olimpia Milano (29th title) (2021–22)
- Most championships: Olimpia Milano (29 titles)
- CEO: Fernando Marino
- TV partners: LBATV; Sky Sport
- Website: www.legabasket.it
- 2025–26 LBA season

The Lega Basket A (officially: Lega Società di Pallacanestro Serie A, English: Basket League) is the organizing body, as delegated by the Italian Basketball Federation, of the top division of Italian professional men's basketball league, the Serie A (English: Basket League A Series). It is composed of the clubs that participate in the Lega Basket Serie A. It is headquartered in Bologna, Italy.

Basket League is a founding member of ULEB. Basket League organizes the LBA, the Italian Cup, the Italian Supercup, and the Italian All Star Game. Discussions have been held as to the possibility of Basket League gaining more autonomy, similarly to that of the corresponding football organization, Lega Serie A. It is the sole professional sport league in Italy outside football. The current president of Basket League is Fernando Marino.

== History ==
Basket League was officially incorporated on May 27, 1970, in Milan, and included the clubs that participated in both the first division Serie A1 and the second division Serie A2. On June 20, 2001, it was changed to include only the first-division Serie A1 clubs, renaming the competition Serie A.

== Presidents ==
Presidents of Basket League from 1970 to present.

- 1970–72: Adalberto Tedeschi
- 1972–77: Giancarlo Tesini
- 1977–79: Gianni Corsolini
- 1979–84: Luciano Acciari
- 1984–92: Gianni De Michelis
- 1992–94: Giulio Malgara
- 1994–96: Roberto Allievi
- 1996–98: Angelo Rovati
- 1998–00: Alfredo Cazzola
- 2000–01: Sergio D'Antoni
- 2001–02: Marco Madrigali
- 2002–07: Enrico Prandi
- 2007: Umberto Pieraccioni
- 2007–08: Francesco Corrado
- 2009–14: Valentino Renzi
- 2014: Fernando Marino
- 2016–2020: Egidio Bianchi
- 2020–present: Umberto Gandini

== See also ==
- Serie A (Basketball)
- Serie A2 (Basketball)
- Italian Basketball Federation
- Italian Basketball Cup
- Italian Basketball Supercup
- Italian All Star Game
