= Rickie Winslow =

American basketball player (born 1964)

Personal information
- Born: July 26, 1964 (age 62) Houston, Texas, U.S.
- Listed height: 6 ft 8 in (2.03 m)
- Listed weight: 225 lb (102 kg)

Career information
- High school: Yates (Houston, Texas)
- College: Houston (1983–1987)
- NBA draft: 1987: 2nd round, 28th overall pick
- Drafted by: Chicago Bulls
- Playing career: 1987–2000
- Position: Small forward
- Number: 9, 11, 13, 40, 41

Career history
- 1987: Milwaukee Bucks
- 1987: Cajacanarias La Laguna
- 1988–1993: Estudiantes
- 1993–1994: Clear Cantù
- 1994–1995: Pau Orthez
- 1995: Amway Zaragoza
- 1995–1996: Fenerbahçe
- 1996–1998: Telekom Ankara
- 1998–1999: Ülkerspor
- 1999–2000: Efes Pilsen

Career highlights
- Spanish Cup winner (1992); 5× Spanish League All-Star (1989, 1990, 1991, 1992, 1994); Spanish League All-Star Slam Dunk Contest Champion (1989); French League All-Star (1995); 3× Second-team All-SWC (1985–1987); McDonald's All-American (1983); First-team Parade All-American (1983); Second-team Parade All-American (1982)
- Stats at NBA.com
- Stats at Basketball Reference

Rickie O'Neal Winslow (born July 26, 1964) is an American former professional basketball player. He has a Turkish passport under the name Kartal Reşat Fırıncıoğlu. Winslow, who was selected by the Chicago Bulls, with the 28th overall pick, in the 2nd round of the 1987 NBA draft, played in seven NBA games, during the 1987–88 season, with the Milwaukee Bucks.

== High school ==
Winslow played high school basketball at Yates High School in Houston, Texas. He was a teammate of Carven Holcombe.

== College career ==
Winslow continued his basketball career across the street at the University of Houston, where he played for four years, from 1983 to 1987, and he was one of the last "official" members of the famed Phi Slama Jama dunking fraternity.

== Professional career ==
Winslow was selected by the Chicago Bulls, with the 28th overall pick, in the 2nd round of the 1987 NBA draft. He played in seven NBA games with the Milwaukee Bucks, during the 1987–88 season,

Winslow spent five years with the Spanish ACB League club Estudiantes Madrid, and with them he won the Spanish Cup title in 1992, and played at the 1992 EuroLeague Final Four. He also played in the Turkish Super League, with Fenerbahçe, Efes Pilsen, and Türk Telekom.

== Personal life ==
Winslow is the father of professional basketball player Justise Winslow.

== Career statistics ==
Legend
| GP | Games played | GS | Games started | MPG | Minutes per game |
| FG% | Field goal percentage | 3P% | 3-point field goal percentage | FT% | Free throw percentage |
| RPG | Rebounds per game | APG | Assists per game | SPG | Steals per game |
| BPG | Blocks per game | PPG | Points per game | **Bold** | Career high |

=== NBA ===
==== Regular season ====
| Year | Team | GP | GS | MPG | FG% | 3P% | FT% | RPG | APG | SPG | BPG | PPG |
|---|---|---|---|---|---|---|---|---|---|---|---|---|
| 1987–88 | Milwaukee | 7 | 0 | 6.4 | .231 | .000 | .500 | 1.0 | .3 | .1 | .0 | 1.0 |
