= Emanual Davis =

American basketball player

Personal information
- Born: August 27, 1968 (age 58) Philadelphia, Pennsylvania, U.S.
- Listed height: 6 ft 4 in (1.93 m)
- Listed weight: 195 lb (88 kg)

Career information
- High school: Kensington (Philadelphia, Pennsylvania)
- College: Delaware State (1988–1991)
- NBA draft: 1991: undrafted
- Playing career: 1991–2003
- Position: Point guard / shooting guard
- Number: 15

Career history
- 1991: Philadelphia Spirit
- 1992–1993: Yakima Sun Kings
- 1993–1994: Rockford Lightning
- 1994–1995: Teamsystem Rimini
- 1995–1996: Rockford Lightning
- 1996–1998: Houston Rockets
- 1998–1999: Pau-Orthez
- 1999: Panionios
- 1999–2001: Seattle SuperSonics
- 2001–2003: Atlanta Hawks

Career highlights
- USBL champion (1991); All-CBA First Team (1996); CBA Defensive Player of the Year (1996); CBA All-Defensive Team (1996); First-team All-MEAC (1991)

Career NBA statistics
- Points: 1,100
- Rebounds: 440
- Assists: 396
- Stats at NBA.com
- Stats at Basketball Reference

Emanual Davis (born August 27, 1968) is an American professional basketball player. As a 6-foot-4-inch (1.93 m) point guard, Davis played college basketball for the Delaware State Hornets in Dover, Delaware. Davis was never drafted by a National Basketball Association team, and played in the Continental Basketball Association (CBA), Italian Basketball League, United States Basketball League and the Atlantic Basketball Association in a span of five years before making it into the NBA. Davis played in six NBA seasons, from 1996 to 1998, then from 1999 to 2003. He played for the Houston Rockets, Seattle SuperSonics, and Atlanta Hawks. In his NBA career, Davis played in 227 games and scored a total of 1,100 points, averaging 4.9 points a game.

Davis played in the CBA for the Yakima Sun Kings during the 1992–93 season and the Rockford Lightning during the 1993–94 and 1995–96 seasons. He was selected as the CBA Defensive Player of the Year and named to the All-CBA First Team in 1996.

== Career statistics ==
Legend
GP	Games played	GS	Games started	MPG	Minutes per game
FG%	Field goal percentage	3P%	3-point field goal percentage	FT%	Free throw percentage
RPG	Rebounds per game	APG	Assists per game	SPG	Steals per game
BPG	Blocks per game	PPG	Points per game	**Bold**	Career high

=== NBA ===
==== Regular season ====
Year	Team	GP	GS	MPG	FG%	3P%	FT%	RPG	APG	SPG	BPG	PPG
1996–97	Houston	13	0	17.7	**.444**	**.444**	.625	1.7	2.0	.7	**.2**	5.0
1997–98	Houston	45	0	13.3	**.444**	.375	.838	1.0	1.3	.4	.1	4.1
1999–00	Seattle	54	2	13.0	.364	.301	.674	1.9	1.3	.7	.1	4.0
2000–01	Seattle	**62**	**39**	20.8	.418	.394	.818	2.5	2.2	**1.0**	**.2**	5.8
2001–02	Atlanta	28	20	**27.6**	.354	.341	**.889**	**2.6**	**2.4**	**1.0**	**.2**	**6.6**
2002–03	Atlanta	24	1	14.2	.364	.241	.773	1.8	1.5	.5	.1	3.7
Career		226	62	17.4	.394	.352	.787	1.9	1.8	.7	.1	4.9
