= Fabrizio Frates =

Italian basketball coach

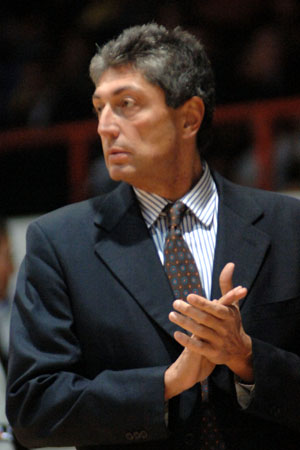
Fabrizio Frates

Fabrizio Frates (Milan, July 16, 1959) is an Italian basketball coach.

== Career ==
=== Cantù & Treviso ===
Frates become head coach of Clear Cantù just over in his thirty years, in the 1990–91 season and won the FIBA Korać Cup that year (1990–91 FIBA Korać Cup), defeating in a double final, the Spanish powerhouse Real Madrid. In the 1993–94 season he moved to Benetton Treviso where he won the Italian Cup against Glaxo Verona (78:61 score) and simultaneously participated for his first time in the FIBA European League but failed to lead his team (which incidentally was this competition finalist of the previous season in Athens) beyond the group stage at 16.

In the following years become head coach of several basketball clubs, including the Panapesca Montecatini Sporting Basketball Club (1995–96), Aresium Milano license plate Blue Club, Pallacanestro Gorizia where he won the promotion for serie A1, Ducato Siena, Snaidero Udine and Pallacanestro Reggiana.

=== In Reggio Emilia ===
Frates arrived in Reggio Emilia in the 2003–04 season, replacing Luca Dalmonte, and won promotion to the top flight. He was retained for next season, 2004-05 disputandola in the top division. The Emilian team won several games, especially at home with the support of the public, and can amazingly to qualify for the men's basketball Final Eight Italian Cup, a historic achievement, which Frates also added victories in the quarterfinals and semifinals, winning the final played and lost 74–64 against the team Treviso full of champions coached by Ettore Messina. Frates still managed to lead the team to the ULEB Cup, but not in the playoffs. There is still a season on the bench of Reggio Emilia, where he surrounds himself with new and talented players. Frates, deemed to be able to find out from various nurseries of young players with a great future society, has the merit of having gambled and focused on new Italian and American prospects as Terrell McIntyre, Ricky Minard, Benjamin Ortner, Marco Carra, Luca Infante, Brett Blizzard and especially of Angelo Gigli and Giorgio Boscagin. In Europe he manages to dominate their group and reach the quarterfinals where it is defeated by the Serbian Hemofarm Vrsac. The team from Emilia, however, pays the false start in the league and therefore does not get into the playoffs, but without ever being considered among the teams in the struggle for salvation. The following year Frates is no longer the coach of Reggiana Basketball. During the years when he coached the basketball team of Reggio Emilia, always carried on the bench for the first team the young Nicolo Melli, which then made his debut and would explode in later years.

=== Experience with Fortitudo ===
Courted by many Italian teams, Fortitudo Bologna is to make sure the Milan coach. The experience proves to be negative, despite a roster of high-level players with the caliber of Marco Belinelli, Stefano Mancinelli, Daniele Cavaliero (with these talented young people could continue the ambitious project of exploitation of players managed perfectly in Reggio Emilia) and players experts like Tyus Edney and Preston Shumpert. But the relationship with the Bologna-based company culminating with his exemption in the current season. Reports idyllic with the leadership they wrecked the adventure began with much enthusiasm by the same Frates, eager to lead a team that made the Euroleague, but ended in the worst way. It ends even in the case, accused of blaspheming during

=== The revival in Caserta ===
Back in November 16, 2007, in Legadue as head coach of Juvecaserta, replaced instead by Andrea Trinchieri with a deep roster of promotions to the specialist Randolph Childress and Guillermo Díaz, with the expert support of Alessandro Frosini, Jay Larranaga, Ivan Cat and others like Andrea Ice, and David Brkic. With this competitive roster centers into the playoffs the historical return in League A defeating the Aurora Basket Jesi coach Andrea Capobianco 3–1. In the following year still trains the Juvecaserta, starting from confirmations by Guillermo Díaz, David Brkic, Jay Larranaga, Alessandro Frosini and new grafts Ron Slay, Fabio Di Bella and Andrea Michelori. Frates, after a troubled first part of the season and with a few successful results thanks to a series of victories in the final period of the championship, to save the team from relegation.

=== Driving Sutor Montegranaro ===
In the summer of 2009 arrived at Sutor Montegranaro. The roster who entrusted the company is formed by Italians like Anthony Maestranzi, Andrea Cinciarini, Daniele Cavaliero, Luca Lechthaler, Michele Antonutti by adding Marquinhos, Robert Hite, Demián Filloy, Dejan Ivanov and Greg Brunner. The first results were particularly exciting, still half a season participates in the Italian Cup, losing the listed Mens Sana Siena. Then the group begins to engage, and putting a series of 10 consecutive victories in the league managed to close in a sixth place in the table, taking part in the play-off championship, which will be eliminated by losing 3–0 to Olimpia Milano. In the summer of 2010, the leadership Veregrense replaces Frates with Stefano Pillastrini.

=== The return to Reggio Emilia ===
Pallacanestro Reggiana in December 2010 recalls Frates on the bench, after a start of the season (Legadue) definitely broken with the team in the hands of Piero Coen first and then Alessandro Finelli. It then reassembles the pair Fabrizio Frates - Massimiliano "Max" Menetti (former deputy of the first two head-coach), which had led to excellent results in the Emilian city in Montegranaro. Fabrizio Frates signed for a contract with the Emilian company until July 2013, but terminated early in June of 2011 to enter the coaching staff of Olimpia Milano.

=== In Milan ===
June 25, 2011, Frates hired by Armani Jeans Milano as assistant to the new coach Sergio Scariolo. The December 18, 2012 is relieved from the club.

=== Reggio Calabria ===
On February 10, 2016, he was appointed as head coach of the Viola Reggio Calabria, replacing Giovanni Benedetto.

== Honours and achievements ==
FIBA Korać Cup

- Winner (1): 1990–91

Italian Cup

- Winner (1): 1993–94
