= A. J. English =

American basketball player (born 1967)

Virginia Union Panthers
- Title: Head coach
- Conference: Central Intercollegiate Athletic Association

Personal information
- Born: July 11, 1967 (age 59) Wilmington, Delaware, U.S.
- Listed height: 6 ft 3 in (1.91 m)
- Listed weight: 175 lb (79 kg)

Career information
- High school: Howard Career Center (Wilmington, Delaware)
- College: Virginia Union (1986–1990)
- NBA draft: 1990: 2nd round, 37th overall pick
- Drafted by: Washington Bullets
- Playing career: 1990–2000
- Position: Shooting guard
- Number: 14
- Coaching career: 2026–present

Career history

Playing
- 1990–1992: Washington Bullets
- 1992–1993: Stefanel Trieste
- 1993: Rapid City Thrillers
- 1993–1994: Rochester Renegade
- 1994: Burghy Roma
- 1994: Olitalia Forlì
- 1994–1995: Levallois
- 1995–1996: Baloncesto Salamanca
- 1996: Rolly Pistoia
- 1996–1997: Beşiktaş
- 1997–1998: Levallois
- 1998–1999: Paris Basket Racing
- 1999: Richmond Rhythm
- 1999–2000: Aris

Coaching
- 2026–present: Virginia Union

Career highlights
- NABC Division II Player of the Year (1990)

Career NBA statistics
- Points: 1,502 (9.9 ppg)
- Rebounds: 315 (2.1 rpg)
- Assists: 320 (2.1 apg)
- Stats at NBA.com
- Stats at Basketball Reference

Albert Jay "A. J." English (born July 11, 1967) is an American former professional basketball player who played two seasons in the National Basketball Association (NBA). He is also the father of current player A. J. English III.

== College ==
English played Basketball for Howard High School of Technology from 1983 to 1986. The team was State Champions in 1985 and he received the Delaware High School Player of the Year in 1986. He played for Virginia Union University from 1986 to 1990. English was named the NCAA Division II National Player of the Year in 1990

== NBA career ==
He was selected by the Washington Bullets in the second round (37th overall) of the 1990 NBA draft. English played two seasons for the Bullets, averaging 9.9 points per game.

English signed a contract with Portland Trail Blazers on October 1, 1993. He was placed on waivers on November 2, 1993, and did not play in the NBA again.

== Coaching career ==
On April 17, 2026, English was named head coach at his alma mater, Virginia Union.

== Career highlights and awards ==
The Delaware Sports Museum and Hall of Fame inducted English in 2004.
