= Warren Kidd =

American basketball player

Personal information
- Born: September 9, 1970 (age 56) Harpersville, Alabama, U.S.
- Listed height: 6 ft 9 in (2.06 m)
- Listed weight: 235 lb (107 kg)

Career information
- High school: Vincent (Vincent, Alabama)
- College: Middle Tennessee (1990–1993)
- NBA draft: 1993: undrafted
- Playing career: 1993–2003
- Position: Center
- Number: 43

Career history
- 1993–1994: Philadelphia 76ers
- 1994–1995: Valencia
- 1995–1996: Caja San Fernando
- 1996–1998: Olimpia Milano
- 1998–2000: Virtus Roma
- 2000–2001: Joventut Badalona
- 2001–2002: Canarias
- 2002–2003: Olimpia Milano

Career highlights
- NCAA rebounding leader (1993); 2× First-team All-OVC (1991, 1993); Second-team All-OVC (1992)
- Stats at NBA.com
- Stats at Basketball Reference

Warren Lynn Kidd (born September 9, 1970) is an American former basketball player. A center, he played a single National Basketball Association (NBA) season with the Philadelphia 76ers, with the rest of his career taking place in Europe.

== College career ==
Kidd played for Middle Tennessee of the Ohio Valley Conference in the NCAA Division I from 1990 to 1993. He led NCAA Division I in rebounding during his last collegiate season in 1993.

== Professional career ==
Though he went undrafted in the 1993 NBA draft, Kidd would be signed by the Philadelphia 76ers in October 1993. He played 68 games for the 76ers, averaging 3.6 points and 3.4 rebounds in 13 minutes in his solitary season with the side.

He then moved to Europe where he played for the rest of his career. Kidd first moved to Spain to play in the Liga ACB for Valencia, he would also suit up for Sevilla, Joventut Badalona and Tenerife.

He also played in the Italian Serie A, for Olimpia Milano and Virtus Roma, leading the league in rebounding with the latter in 1998–99.

With Olimpia Milano he would play in the European premier competition, the EuroLeague—where he also led in rebounding in 1996–97—and the second-tier Saporta Cup, reaching the final in 1998.

== See also ==
- List of NCAA Division I men's basketball season rebounding leaders
