= Dan Godfread =

American basketball player (born 1967)

Personal information
- Born: July 14, 1967 (age 59) Fort Wayne, Indiana
- Listed height: 6 ft 10 in (2.08 m)
- Listed weight: 250 lb (113 kg)

Career information
- High school: Stillman Valley (Stillman Valley, Illinois)
- College: Evansville (1985–1990)
- NBA draft: 1990: undrafted
- Playing career: 1990–2000
- Position: Center
- Number: 52, 35

Career history
- 1990: Rockford Lightning
- 1990–1991: Minnesota Timberwolves
- 1991: Houston Rockets
- 1991–1992: Rockford Lightning
- 1992: Libertas Forlì
- 1992–1994: Andorra
- 1994–1995: Caja San Fernando
- 1995–1996: FC Barcelona
- 1996–1997: Ülker
- 1997: Cáceres
- 1998: Olimpia Pistoia
- 1998: Granada
- 2000: Melilla

Career highlights
- First-team All-MCC (1989)
- Stats at NBA.com
- Stats at Basketball Reference

Daniel Joseph Godfread (born June 14, 1967) is an American retired professional basketball player at the center position with the Minnesota Timberwolves in the 1990–91 NBA season and the Houston Rockets in the 1991–92 NBA season. He also played in the Continental Basketball Association for the Rockford Lightning.

Born in Fort Wayne, Indiana, he played collegiately for the Evansville Purple Aces after attending Stillman Valley High School in Stillman Valley, Illinois.
