= John Turner (basketball) =

American basketball player (born 1967)

Personal information
- Born: November 30, 1967 (age 58) Washington, D.C., U.S.
- Listed height: 6 ft 8 in (2.03 m)
- Listed weight: 245 lb (111 kg)

Career information
- High school: Eleanor Roosevelt (Greenbelt, Maryland)
- College: Allegany CC (1986–1987); Georgetown (1988–1989); Phillips (1990–1991)
- NBA draft: 1991: 1st round, 20th overall pick
- Drafted by: Houston Rockets
- Playing career: 1991–2003
- Position: Power forward
- Number: 40

Career history
- 1991–1992: Houston Rockets
- 1992–1993: Banco Natwest Zaragoza
- 1994: Teamsystem Fabriano
- 1994–1996: Comerson/Cx Orologi Siena
- 1996–1997: Bini Viaggi Livorno
- 1997–1998: Faber Fabriano
- 1998: Poenamo Kings
- 1998: Calze Pompea Roma
- 1998–1999: Mabo Pistoia
- 1999: Serapide Pozzuoli
- 1999–2000: Ducato Siena
- 2000–2002: Record Napoli
- 2002–2003: Carifac Fabriano
- Stats at NBA.com
- Stats at Basketball Reference

John Leslie Turner (born November 30, 1967) is an American former professional basketball player.

== Professional career ==
Turner was selected by the Houston Rockets in the first round (20th pick overall) of the 1991 NBA draft, playing for the team in the National Basketball Association (NBA) for one season.

During the 1991-92 NBA season, he appeared in 42 games, averaging 2.8 points per game. At the end of the season, in August 1992, the Rockets agreed to release Turner so he could go to Spain to play for CAI Zaragoza.
