= Tim Burroughs =

American basketball player (born 1969)

Personal information
- Born: October 14, 1969 (age 57) Hopkins, South Carolina, U.S.
- Listed height: 6 ft 8 in (2.03 m)
- Listed weight: 250 lb (113 kg)

Career information
- High school: Lower Richland (Hopkins, South Carolina)
- College: Independence CC (1988–1989); Delgado CC (1989–1990); Jacksonville (1990–1992)
- NBA draft: 1992: 2nd round, 51st overall pick
- Drafted by: Minnesota Timberwolves
- Playing career: 1992–1999
- Position: Power forward

Career history
- 1992–1993: Breogán Lugo
- 1993: Jacksonville Hooters
- 1993–1994: Pulitalia Vicenza
- 1994: Efes Pilsen
- 1994: AEK Athens
- 1994–1995: Panapesca Montecatini
- 1995: Jacksonville Barracudas
- 1995: Tuborg İzmir
- 1995–1996: Amway Zaragoza
- 1996–1997: Montecatini
- 1997: Baloncesto Fuenlabrada
- 1997–1998: Orka Sport Kavardaci
- 1998–1999: Bayer Leverkusen
- 1999: Tampa Bay Windjammers
- Stats at Basketball Reference

Tim Burroughs (born October 14, 1969) is a 6'8" American former basketball power forward from Jacksonville University and was drafted by the Minnesota Timberwolves in the second round, with the 51st pick overall in 1992.
