= Kenny Green (basketball, born 1967) =

American basketball player

Personal information
- Born: October 13, 1967 (age 58)
- Nationality: American
- Listed height: 6 ft 8 in (2.03 m)

Career information
- High school: Holy Cross (Waterbury, Connecticut)
- College: Rhode Island (1986–1990)
- NBA draft: 1990: undrafted
- Playing career: 1990–2002
- Position: Power forward / center

Career history
- 1990–1991: Rapid City Thrillers
- 1991: Quad City Thunder
- 1991: Columbus Horizon
- 1991: Empire State Stallions
- 1991–1992: Efes Pilsen
- 1992: JDA Dijon
- 1992–1993: Cáceres
- 1993–1994: Zaragoza
- 1994–1997: Tau Ceramica
- 1997–1998: Ülkerspor
- 1998: Granada
- 1998–1999: Breogán
- 2001–2002: Inca

Career highlights
- FIBA Saporta Cup Finals Top Scorer (1995); Spanish League MVP (1997); CBA All-Rookie Team (1991); CBA blocks leader (1991); NCAA blocks leader (1990); Atlantic 10 Player of the Year (1990)

Kenneth Anthony Green (born October 13, 1967) is a retired American professional basketball player. At a height of 6 ft 8 in (2.03 m), he played at the power forward and center positions

== College career ==
Green played collegiate basketball at the University of Rhode Island, between 1986 and 1990. He is the school's all-time leader in blocks, and on five occasions, he blocked eight shots in a single game. Green was named the Atlantic 10 Conference's Freshman of the Year in 1986–87, and as a senior, his 124 blocks, topped the NCAA Division I. He was also honored as the Atlantic 10 Conference Men's Basketball Player of the Year that season. Green finished his career at URI with 1,724 points, 996 rebounds, and 328 blocks. In 2000, he was inducted into the University of Rhode Island Hall of Fame.

== Professional career ==
After college, Green spent over a decade playing professionally, first in the Continental Basketball Association (CBA), for the since defunct teams, the Rapid City Thrillers in Rapid City, South Dakota, and the Columbus Horizon in Columbus, Ohio. He was selected to the CBA All-Rookie Team in 1991. Green then played in Italy, Spain, and Turkey.

== See also ==
- List of NCAA Division I men's basketball season blocks leaders

== Sources ==
- "Kenny Green". Liga ACB. Archived from the original on September 11, 2016.
- "2010–11 NCAA Men's Basketball Records" (PDF). 2010–11 NCAA Men's Basketball Media Guide. National Collegiate Athletic Association. 2010.
- "Rhode Island University basketball team". USbasket.com. Euroleague. 2011.
- "NCAA Men's Basketball: Annual Leaders". Hickoksports.com. July 29, 2010. Archived from the original on May 6, 2010.
- Alfano, Peter (March 25, 1988). "N.C.A.A. Basketball: Villanova Surprised Kentucky; Duke Squeaks By; Duke 73, Rhode Island 72". The New York Times.
- "Kenneth Green ('90)". University of Rhode Island. 2010. Archived from the original on July 23, 2011.
- "10 To Be Enshrined in URI Athletic Hall of Fame". University of Rhode Island. September 7, 2000. Archived from the original on July 11, 2011.
