= Joe Binion =

American basketball player (born 1961)

Personal information
- Born: March 26, 1961 (age 65) Rochester, New York, U.S.
- Listed height: 6 ft 8 in (2.03 m)
- Listed weight: 235 lb (107 kg)

Career information
- High school: Madison (Rochester, New York)
- College: North Carolina A&T (1980–1984)
- NBA draft: 1984: 3rd round, 57th overall pick
- Drafted by: San Antonio Spurs
- Playing career: 1984–1995
- Position: Power forward
- Number: 50

Career history
- 1984–1986: Sarasota / Florida Stingers
- 1985–1987: Kansas City / Topeka Sizzlers
- 1987: Portland Trail Blazers
- 1987–1988: Maccabi Haifa
- 1988–1991: Libertas Livorno
- 1991–1992: Sidis Reggio Emilia
- 1992–1994: Kleenex Pistoia
- 1994–1995: Buckler Bologna

Career highlights
- CBA Most Valuable Player (1987); All-CBA First Team (1987); CBA rebounding leader (1987); 3× MEAC Player of the Year (1982–1984); 3× First-team All-MEAC (1982–1984)
- Stats at NBA.com
- Stats at Basketball Reference

Joe Binion (born March 26, 1961) is an American former professional basketball player who played briefly in the National Basketball Association (NBA). He played college basketball for the North Carolina A&T Aggies, where he was a three-time conference player of the year.

== College career ==
Born in Rochester, New York, Binion played college basketball with the North Carolina Agricultural and Technical State University.

== Professional career ==
Binion was selected by the San Antonio Spurs, in the 3rd round (57th pick overall) of the 1984 NBA draft. He played in the Continental Basketball Association (CBA) for the Sarasota Stingers and Kansas City / Topeka Sizzlers from 1984 to 1987. Binion was selected as the CBA Most Valuable Player and named to the All-CBA First Team in 1987.

Binion played 11 games for the Portland Trail Blazers (1986–87) in the NBA. After that, he played overseas.

== Career statistics ==
Legend
GP	Games played	GS	Games started	MPG	Minutes per game
FG%	Field goal percentage	3P%	3-point field goal percentage	FT%	Free throw percentage
RPG	Rebounds per game	APG	Assists per game	SPG	Steals per game
BPG	Blocks per game	PPG	Points per game	**Bold**	Career high

=== NBA ===
==== Regular season ====
Year	Team	GP	GS	MPG	FG%	3P%	FT%	RPG	APG	SPG	BPG	PPG
1986–87	Portland	11	0	4.6	.400	–	.600	1.6	.1	.2	.2	1.3

== See also ==
- List of NCAA Division I men's basketball players with 2000 points and 1000 rebounds
