= Ron Curry (basketball) =

American basketball player (born 1993)

No. 2 – Górnik Wałbrzych
- Position: Point guard / shooting guard
- League: PLK

Personal information
- Born: July 12, 1993 (age 33) Pennsauken Township, New Jersey, U.S.
- Listed height: 6 ft 3 in (1.91 m)
- Listed weight: 189.2 lb (86 kg)

Career information
- High school: Paul VI (Haddon Township, New Jersey)
- College: James Madison (2012–2016)
- NBA draft: 2016: undrafted
- Playing career: 2016–present

Career history
- 2016–2017: Krka
- 2017–2018: Telekom Baskets Bonn
- 2018–2019: Falco KC Szombathely
- 2019: VEF Rīga
- 2019–2020: Falco KC
- 2020–2021: Alba Fehérvár
- 2021–2022: VEF Rīga
- 2022–2023: ESSM Le Portel
- 2023–2024: Sporting CP
- 2025: Niagara River Lions
- 2025–2026: MKS Dąbrowa Górnicza
- 2026–present: Górnik Wałbrzych

Career highlights
- Latvian-Estonian League champion (2022); LBL champion (2022); Latvian Cup champion (2022); Hungarian League champion (2019); Troféu Stromp champion (2023)

Ronald Lee Curry Jr. (born July 12, 1993) is an American professional basketball player for Górnik Wałbrzych of the Polska Liga Koszykówki (PLK). He played college basketball for James Madison.

== Professional career ==
In August 2016, he signed his first professional contract with Slovenian club Krka. He spent the 2019–20 season with Falco KC Szombathely, averaging 10.2 points, 2.7 rebounds, 3.2 assists and 1.3 steals per game. On August 12, 2020, Curry signed with Alba Fehérvár.

On August 6, 2021, he signed with VEF Rīga of the Estonian-Latvian Basketball League and Champions League.

On May 25, 2022, he signed with ESSM Le Portel of the French LNB Pro A.

On August 23, 2023, he signed with Sporting CP (basketball) of Liga Portuguesa de Basquetebol.

On July 3, 2025, he signed with MKS Dąbrowa Górnicza of the Polish Basketball League (PLK).

On September 27, 2026, he signed with Górnik Wałbrzych of the Polish Basketball League (PLK).

== Personal life ==
Curry grew up in Pennsauken Township, New Jersey and attended Paul VI High School.
