= Medal winners in Spain men's national basketball team =

== Medal winners in Spain men's national basketball team ==
Full list of the 92 medal winners while playing in Spain men's national basketball team since 1935: Olympics, World Cups and EuroBaskets.

	Meaning
OL	Summer Olympics
WC	World Cup / World Championship
EB	EuroBasket / European Championship

Note: updated to EuroBasket 2022

Player	Total	22 EB	19 WC	17 EB	16 OL	15 EB	13 EB	12 OL	11 EB	09 EB	08 OL	07 EB	06 WC	03 EB	01 EB	99 EB	91 EB	84 OL	83 EB	73 EB	35 EB
Rudy Fernández	11	Gold medal	Gold medal		Bronze medal	Gold medal	Bronze medal	Silver medal	Gold medal	Gold medal	Silver medal	Silver medal	Gold medal								
Pau Gasol	11			Bronze medal	Bronze medal	Gold medal		Silver medal	Gold medal	Gold medal	Silver medal	Silver medal	Gold medal	Silver medal	Bronze medal						
Felipe Reyes	10				Bronze medal	Gold medal		Silver medal	Gold medal	Gold medal	Silver medal	Silver medal	Gold medal	Silver medal	Bronze medal						
Juan Carlos Navarro	10			Bronze medal	Bronze medal			Silver medal	Gold medal	Gold medal	Silver medal	Silver medal	Gold medal	Silver medal	Bronze medal						
Marc Gasol	9		Gold medal	Bronze medal			Bronze medal	Silver medal	Gold medal	Gold medal	Silver medal	Silver medal	Gold medal								
José Calderón	8				Bronze medal		Bronze medal	Silver medal	Gold medal		Silver medal	Silver medal	Gold medal	Silver medal							
Sergio Llull	7		Gold medal		Bronze medal	Gold medal	Bronze medal	Silver medal	Gold medal	Gold medal											
Víctor Claver	7		Gold medal		Bronze medal	Gold medal	Bronze medal	Silver medal	Gold medal	Gold medal											
Ricky Rubio	7		Gold medal	Bronze medal	Bronze medal		Bronze medal		Gold medal	Gold medal	Silver medal										
Sergio Rodríguez	7			Bronze medal	Bronze medal	Gold medal	Bronze medal	Silver medal				Silver medal	Gold medal								
Jorge Garbajosa	6									Gold medal	Silver medal	Silver medal	Gold medal	Silver medal	Bronze medal						
Carlos Jiménez	6										Silver medal	Silver medal	Gold medal	Silver medal	Bronze medal	Silver medal					
Willy Hernangómez	5	Gold medal	Gold medal	Bronze medal	Bronze medal	Gold medal															
Álex Mumbrú	5						Bronze medal			Gold medal	Silver medal	Silver medal	Gold medal								
Fernando San Emeterio	5			Bronze medal		Gold medal	Bronze medal	Silver medal	Gold medal												
Carlos Cabezas	3									Gold medal		Silver medal	Gold medal								
Juancho Hernángomez	3	Gold medal	Gold medal	Bronze medal																	
Berni Rodríguez	3										Silver medal	Silver medal	Gold medal								
Raúl López	3									Gold medal	Silver medal				Bronze medal						
Fernando Arcega	3																Bronze medal	Silver medal	Silver medal		
J A San Epifanio, Epi	3																Bronze medal	Silver medal	Silver medal		
Alfonso Reyes	3													Silver medal	Bronze medal	Silver medal					
Pau Ribas	2		Gold medal			Gold medal															
Serge Ibaka	2							Silver medal	Gold medal												
Víctor Sada	2							Silver medal	Gold medal												
Pablo Aguilar	2					Gold medal	Bronze medal														
Nikola Mirotic	2				Bronze medal	Gold medal															
Guillem Vives	2			Bronze medal		Gold medal															
Pierre Oriola	2		Gold medal	Bronze medal																	
Alberto Herreros	2													Silver medal		Silver medal					
Rodrigo de la Fuente	2													Silver medal		Silver medal					
Andrés Jiménez	2																	Silver medal	Silver medal		
Juan Antonio Corbalán	2																	Silver medal	Silver medal		
J D de la Cruz	2																	Silver medal	Silver medal		
J M López Iturriaga	2																	Silver medal	Silver medal		
Fernando Martín	2																	Silver medal	Silver medal		
Fernando Romay	2																	Silver medal	Silver medal		
Josep María Margall	2																	Silver medal	Silver medal		
Nacho Solozábal	2																	Silver medal	Silver medal		
Nacho Rodríguez	2														Bronze medal	Silver medal					
Álex Abrines	2			Bronze medal	Bronze medal																
Player	Total	22 EB	19 WC	17 EB	16 OL	15 EB	13 EB	12 OL	11 EB	09 EB	08 OL	07 EB	06 WC	03 EB	01 EB	99 EB	91 EB	84 OL	83 EB	73 EB	35 EB
Javier Beirán	1		Gold medal																		
Quino Colom	1		Gold medal																		
Xavi Rabaseda	1		Gold medal																		
Alberto Díaz	1	Gold medal																			
Darío Brizuela	1	Gold medal																			
Jaime Fernández	1	Gold medal																			
Jaime Pradilla	1	Gold medal																			
Joel Parra	1	Gold medal																			
Lorenzo Brown	1	Gold medal																			
Sebas Saiz	1	Gold medal																			
Usman Garuba	1	Gold medal																			
Xabier López-Aróstegui	1	Gold medal																			
Armando Maunier	1																				Silver medal
Cayetano Ortega	1																				Silver medal
Emilio Alonso	1																				Silver medal
Fernando Muscat	1																				Silver medal
Juan Carbonell	1																				Silver medal
Pedro Alonso	1																				Silver medal
Rafael Martín	1																				Silver medal
Valentín Ruano	1																				Silver medal
Carmelo Cabrera	1																			Silver medal	
Clifford Luyk	1																			Silver medal	
Enrique Margall	1																			Silver medal	
Gonzalo Sagi-Vela	1																			Silver medal	
José Luis Sagi-Vela	1																			Silver medal	
Luis Miguel Santillana	1																			Silver medal	
Manuel Flores	1																			Silver medal	
Miguel Ángel Estrada	1																			Silver medal	
Nino Buscató	1																			Silver medal	
Rafael Rullán	1																			Silver medal	
Vicente Ramos	1																			Silver medal	
Wayne Brabender	1																			Silver medal	
Cándido Chicho Sibilio	1																		Silver medal		
Joan Chichi Creus	1																		Silver medal		
José Luis Llorente	1																	Silver medal			
José Manuel Beirán	1																	Silver medal			
Alberto Angulo	1															Silver medal					
Iñaki de Miguel	1															Silver medal					
Iván Corrales	1															Silver medal					
José Ignacio Romero	1															Silver medal					
Nacho Rodilla	1															Silver medal					
Roberto Dueñas	1															Silver medal					
Roger Esteller	1															Silver medal					
Antonio Bueno	1													Silver medal							
Carles Marco	1													Silver medal							
Roger Grimau	1													Silver medal							
Jordi Villacampa	1																Bronze medal				
Antonio Martín	1																Bronze medal				
José Miguel Antúnez	1																Bronze medal				
Juan Antonio Orenga	1																Bronze medal				
Manel Bosch	1																Bronze medal				
Mike Hansen	1																Bronze medal				
Pep Cargol	1																Bronze medal				
Quique Andreu	1																Bronze medal				
Rafael Jofresa	1																Bronze medal				
Silvano Bustos	1																Bronze medal				
Chuck Kornegay	1														Bronze medal						
Fran Vázquez	1														Bronze medal						
Lucio Angulo	1														Bronze medal						
José Antonio Paraíso	1														Bronze medal						
Germán Gabriel	1						Bronze medal														
Xavi Rey	1						Bronze medal														
Joan Sastre	1			Bronze medal																	
Player	Total	gar	19 WC	17 EB	16 OL	15 EB	13 EB	12 OL	11 EB	09 EB	08 OL	07 EB	06 WC	03 EB	01 EB	99 EB	91 EB	84 OL	83 EB	73 EB	35 EB

== See also ==
- Spain national basketball team
- Spanish Basketball Federation
- Spain national youth basketball teams
- Basketball at the Summer Olympics
- FIBA Basketball World Cup
- FIBA EuroBasket
