= Spain men's national basketball team =

Men's national basketball team representing Spain

Spain
- FIBA ranking: 6 (1 September 2026)
- Joined FIBA: 1934
- FIBA zone: FIBA Europe
- National federation: FEB
- Coach: Chus Mateo
- Nickname(s): La Roja (The Red One); La ÑBA; La Familia (The Family)

Olympic Games
- Appearances: 14
- Medals: (silver) Silver: (1984, 2008, 2012); (bronze) Bronze: (2016)

FIBA World Cup
- Appearances: 13
- Medals: (gold) Gold: (2006, 2019)

EuroBasket
- Appearances: 34
- Medals: (gold) Gold: (2009, 2011, 2015, 2022); (silver) Silver: (1935, 1973, 1983, 1999, 2003, 2007); (bronze) Bronze: (1991, 2001, 2013, 2017)
Home	Away

First international
- Spain 33–12 Portugal (Madrid, Spain; 15 April 1935)

Biggest win
- Spain 118–32 Libya (Madrid, Spain; 9 May 1963)

Biggest defeat
- Soviet Union 118–58 Spain (Essen, West Germany; 12 September 1971)
Medal record
Olympic Games
Silver medal – second place	1984 Los Angeles	Team
Silver medal – second place	2008 Beijing	Team
Silver medal – second place	2012 London	Team
Bronze medal – third place	2016 Rio de Janeiro	Team
FIBA World Cup
Gold medal – first place	2006 Japan
Gold medal – first place	2019 China
EuroBasket
Gold medal – first place	2009 Poland
Gold medal – first place	2011 Lithuania
Gold medal – first place	2015 France
Gold medal – first place	2022 Germany
Silver medal – second place	1935 Switzerland
Silver medal – second place	1973 Spain
Silver medal – second place	1983 France
Silver medal – second place	1999 France
Silver medal – second place	2003 Sweden
Silver medal – second place	2007 Spain
Bronze medal – third place	1991 Italy
Bronze medal – third place	2001 Turkey
Bronze medal – third place	2013 Slovenia
Bronze medal – third place	2017 Turkey
Mediterranean Games
Gold medal – first place	1955 Barcelona	Team
Gold medal – first place	1997 Bari	Team
Gold medal – first place	2001 Tunis	Team
Silver medal – second place	1951 Alexandria	Team
Silver medal – second place	1959 Beirut	Team
Silver medal – second place	1963 Naples	Team
Silver medal – second place	1987 Latakia	Team
Bronze medal – third place	2005 Almería	Team

The Spain men's national basketball team (Spanish: Selección Española de Baloncesto) represents Spain in international basketball competitions. They are managed by the Spanish Basketball Federation, the governing body for basketball in Spain.

Spain has appeared 33 times at the EuroBasket, winning four gold medals, six silver medals, and four bronze medals. They have also competed at the Summer Olympics 14 times, with three silver medals and one bronze medal as their accomplishments. They have qualified for the FIBA World Cup 13 times, winning it twice, in 2006 and 2019.

Spain is currently ranked sixth in the FIBA World Ranking.

== History ==
=== Olympic Games ===
When Spain qualified for the 1936 Summer Olympics, where basketball was part of the games for the first time, expectations were high for the runners-up of the 1935 EuroBasket. Unfortunately, as one of the favorites to win medals, Spain could not attend the Games due to the outbreak of the Spanish Civil War just days before the start of the event.

Spain's first Olympic success came at the 1984 Summer Olympics. The team made it all the way to the gold medal game, before losing to the United States (led by Patrick Ewing and featuring a young Michael Jordan).

At the 2008 Summer Olympics, Spain reached the gold medal game for the second time. However, in a rematch of the 1984 Olympic final, Spain fell to the United States once more. This time led by Kobe Bryant and nicknamed the "Redeem Team", the Americans won after a remarkably close game 118–107. Four years later, at the 2012 Summer Olympics in London, the United States faced Spain in the Olympic final for the third time. The USA would go on to win gold again, by the score of 107–100, with Spain coming away with its third Olympic (and second straight) silver medal. During the 2016 Summer Olympics, Spain reached the bronze medal match against Australia, where they escaped with a narrow 89–88 victory.

=== FIBA World Cup ===
During the early years of the FIBA World Cup, Spain struggled to establish a steady presence as a competitor. Between 1950 and 1970, the national team only qualified once. Then, beginning in 1974, Spain developed into a serious competitor and regularly finished among the World Cup top performers in the competitions to follow.

At the 2006 FIBA World Cup, Spain achieved their greatest success in its history, as they defeated Greece in the final to capture their first World Cup title. Held at the Saitama Super Arena in Japan, the game ended by the final score of 70–47. Furthermore, Pau Gasol was named the tournament MVP, while Jorge Garbajosa was selected to the All-Tournament team. Shortly afterwards, the team were awarded with the 2006 Prince of Asturias Award in Sports.

At the 2019 FIBA World Cup, Spain won their second World Cup title by defeating Argentina in the final by the score of 95–75. The spectacular play of Ricky Rubio during the tournament earned him the MVP, while Marc Gasol was named to the All-Tournament team. After this victory, Marc Gasol became the second player in tournament history to win the NBA title and the World Cup in the same year; with the other being Lamar Odom.

=== EuroBasket ===
The first game in the history of the selection was a qualifier for the EuroBasket 1935, where Spain defeated Portugal 33–12. This event, which was held in Geneva in the summer of 1935, was the first EuroBasket game in history. Spain went on to finish as runners-up in the tournament behind Latvia.

After coming in second in 1935, 1973, 1983, 1999, 2003, and 2007, Spain won their first continental championship in 2009; defeating Serbia to become European champions. The team repeated their success in 2011, taking out France in the final. At EuroBasket 2015, Spain once again reached the title game, and demolished Lithuania in the process 80–63. Two years after winning it all in 2015, Spain followed it up with another strong performance at EuroBasket 2017, defeating Russia to win the bronze medal match. It marked the fourth time Spain won bronze at the EuroBasket, as they also won it in 1991, 2001, and 2013.

Spain captured their fourth European title at the EuroBasket 2022, after defeating France in the final once again, a rematch of the 2011 title game. Additionally, center Willy Hernangómez was selected as tournament MVP. After winning the EuroBasket in 2022, Spain endured their worst result ever at the competition in 2025. They finished 17th, and failed to make it past the group stage of the tournament for the first time in their history.

=== Other events ===
Besides success at the "Big Three" events (Summer Olympic Games, FIBA World Cup, and EuroBasket) Spain has also had success at the Mediterranean Games, where it has won several medals: three gold, four silver and one bronze.

== Medal record ==
The Spain national team's medal record through the years:

Olympic Games

- Silver medals: 1984, 2008, 2012
- Bronze medals: 2016

FIBA World Cup

- Gold medals: 2006, 2019

EuroBasket

- Gold medals: 2009, 2011, 2015, 2022
- Silver medals: 1935, 1973, 1983, 1999, 2003, 2007
- Bronze medals: 1991, 2001, 2013, 2017

Mediterranean Games

- Gold medal: 1955, 1997, 2001
- Silver medals: 1951, 1959, 1963, 1987
- Bronze medals: 2005

== Competitive record ==
=== FIBA World Cup ===
World Cup					Qualification		
Year	Position	Pld	W	L	Pld	W	L
(Argentina) 1950	9th	5	1	4	5	3	2
(Brazil) 1954	Did not enter				Did not enter		
(Chile) 1959	Did not enter				Did not enter		
(Brazil) 1963	Did not qualify				EuroBasket served as qualifiers		
(Uruguay) 1967	Did not qualify				EuroBasket served as qualifiers		
(Socialist Federal Republic of Yugoslavia) 1970	Did not qualify				EuroBasket served as qualifiers		
(Puerto Rico) 1974	5th	9	4	5	EuroBasket served as qualifiers		
(Philippines) 1978	Did not qualify				EuroBasket served as qualifiers		
(Colombia) 1982	4th	9	6	3	EuroBasket served as qualifiers		
(Spain) 1986	5th	10	8	2	Qualified as host		
(Argentina) 1990	10th	8	5	3	EuroBasket served as qualifiers		
(Canada) 1994	10th	8	5	3	EuroBasket served as qualifiers		
(Greece) 1998	5th	9	7	2	EuroBasket served as qualifiers		
(United States) 2002	5th	9	7	2	EuroBasket served as qualifiers		
(Japan) 2006	1st place, gold medalist(s)	9	9	0	EuroBasket served as qualifiers		
(Turkey) 2010	6th	9	5	4	EuroBasket served as qualifiers		
(Spain) 2014	5th	7	6	1	Qualified as host		
(China) 2019	1st place, gold medalist(s)	8	8	0	12	10	2
(Philippines) (Japan) (Indonesia) 2023	9th	5	3	2	12	10	2
(Qatar) 2027	To be determined				In progress		
(France) 2031	To be determined				To be determined		
Total	13/19	105	74	31	29	23	6

=== Olympic Games ===
Olympic Games					Qualifying		
Year	Position	Pld	W	L	Pld	W	L
(Nazi Germany) 1936	w/o^{A}	2	0	2			
(United Kingdom) 1948	Did not enter						
(Finland) 1952	Did not enter						
(Australia) 1956	Did not enter						
(Italy) 1960	11th	7	2	5	6	5	1
(Japan) 1964	Did not qualify				8	6	2
(Mexico) 1968	7th	9	5	4	4	3	1
(West Germany) 1972	11th	9	4	5	16	13	3
(Canada) 1976	Did not qualify				9	6	3
(Soviet Union) 1980	4th	8	4	4	10	7	3
(United States) 1984	2nd place, silver medalist(s)	8	6	2	9	8	1
(South Korea) 1988	8th	8	4	4	10	7	3
(Spain) 1992	9th	7	3	4	Qualified as host		
(United States) 1996	Did not qualify				Did not qualify		
(Australia) 2000	9th	6	2	4	Direct qualification		
(Greece) 2004	7th	7	6	1	Direct qualification		
(China) 2008	2nd place, silver medalist(s)	8	6	2	Direct qualification		
(United Kingdom) 2012	2nd place, silver medalist(s)	8	5	3	Direct qualification		
(Brazil) 2016	3rd place, bronze medalist(s)	8	5	3	Direct qualification		
(Japan) 2020	6th	4	2	2	Direct qualification		
(France) 2024	10th	3	1	2	4	4	0
(United States) 2028	To be determined				To be determined		
Total	14/21	102	55	47	76	59	17

Notes

^{^A} Spain withdrew due to the Spanish Civil War.
FIBA considers two games as forfeited (walkover)

=== EuroBasket ===
EuroBasket					Qualification		
Year	Position	Pld	W	L	Pld	W	L
(Switzerland) 1935	2nd place, silver medalist(s)	3	2	1	1	1	0
(Latvia) 1937	Did not enter						
(Lithuania) 1939	Did not enter						
(Switzerland) 1946	Did not enter						
(Czechoslovakia) 1947	Did not enter						
(Egypt) 1949	Did not enter						
(France) 1951	Did not enter						
(Soviet Union) 1953	Did not enter						
(Hungary) 1955	Did not enter						
(Bulgaria) 1957	Did not enter						
(Turkey) 1959	15th	7	3	4			
(Socialist Federal Republic of Yugoslavia) 1961	13th	7	5	2			
(Poland) 1963	7th	9	5	4	2	2	0
(Soviet Union) 1965	11th	9	4	5	3	2	1
(Finland) 1967	10th	9	3	6	2	1	1
(Italy) 1969	5th	7	4	3	4	4	0
(West Germany) 1971	7th	7	3	4	5	4	1
(Spain) 1973	2nd place, silver medalist(s)	7	5	2	Qualified as host		
(Socialist Federal Republic of Yugoslavia) 1975	4th	7	4	3	Direct qualification		
(Belgium) 1977	9th	7	4	3	Direct qualification		
(Italy) 1979	6th	7	3	4	8	7	1
(Czechoslovakia) 1981	4th	9	6	3	Direct qualification		
(France) 1983	2nd place, silver medalist(s)	7	5	2	Direct qualification		
(West Germany) 1985	4th	8	5	3	Direct qualification		
(Greece) 1987	4th	8	4	4	Direct qualification		
(Socialist Federal Republic of Yugoslavia) 1989	5th	5	3	2	6	5	1
(Italy) 1991	3rd place, bronze medalist(s)	5	3	2	3	2	1
(Germany) 1993	5th	9	7	2	Direct qualification		
(Greece) 1995	6th	9	5	4	6	5	1
(Spain) 1997	5th	9	6	3	Qualified as host		
(France) 1999	2nd place, silver medalist(s)	9	5	4	10	10	0
(Turkey) 2001	3rd place, bronze medalist(s)	7	5	2	Direct qualification		
(Sweden) 2003	2nd place, silver medalist(s)	6	5	1	10	9	1
(Serbia and Montenegro) 2005	4th	6	3	3	Direct qualification		
(Spain) 2007	2nd place, silver medalist(s)	9	7	2	Qualified as host		
(Poland) 2009	1st place, gold medalist(s)	9	7	2	Direct qualification		
(Lithuania) 2011	1st place, gold medalist(s)	11	10	1	Direct qualification		
(Slovenia) 2013	3rd place, bronze medalist(s)	11	7	4	Direct qualification		
(France) (Croatia) (Germany) (Latvia) 2015	1st place, gold medalist(s)	9	7	2	Direct qualification		
(Finland) (Israel) (Romania) (Turkey) 2017	3rd place, bronze medalist(s)	9	8	1	Direct qualification		
(Czech Republic) (Georgia (country)) (Italy) (Germany) 2022	1st place, gold medalist(s)	9	8	1	6	4	2
(Cyprus) (Finland) (Poland) (Latvia) 2025	17th	5	2	3	6	3	3
(Estonia) (Greece) (Slovenia) (Spain) 2029	Qualified as co-host				Qualified as co-host		
Total	34/43	255	163	92	72	59	13

== Results and fixtures ==
Win Loss

=== 2025 ===
27 November 2025 2027 FIBA World Cup qualifiers – 1st round	Denmark	64–74	Spain	Farum, Denmark
18:30 CET (UTC+1)	Scoring by quarter: 23–25, 10–20, 14–15, 17–14
	Pts: Jensen 20; Rebs: Larsen 8 Asts: Jensen, Pedersen 3	Boxscore	Pts: Fernández 15; Rebs: Osobor, Paulí 8 Asts: Cárdenas 4	Arena: Farum Arena; Attendance: 2,630; Referees: Mārtiņš Kozlovskis (LAT), Michał Proc (POL), Blaž Zupančič (SVN)

30 November 2025 2027 FIBA World Cup qualifiers – 1st round	Spain	90–61	Georgia	La Laguna, Spain
18:45 (UTC+0)	Scoring by quarter: 19–22, 28–11, 23–13, 20–15
	Pts: Yusta 17; Rebs: Almansa 9 Asts: Yusta 6	Boxscore	Pts: Khatiashvili, Shengelia 10; Rebs: Shengelia 7 Asts: Andronikashvili 4	Arena: Pabellón Insular Santiago Martín; Attendance: 4,603; Referees: Boris Krejić (SVN), Ventsislav Velikov (BUL), Siniša Prpa (SRB)

=== 2026 ===
27 February 2026 2027 FIBA World Cup qualifiers – 1st round	Ukraine	66–86	Spain	Riga, Latvia
15:00 EET (UTC+2)	Scoring by quarter: 21–17, 12–15, 14–33, 19–21
	Pts: Kovliar 15; Rebs: three players 4 Asts: Zotov 5	Boxscore	Pts: Bassas, Cárdenas 16; Rebs: Almansa 7 Asts: Fernández 5	Arena: Arena Riga; Attendance: 605; Referees: Ademir Zurapović (BIH), Paulo Marques (POR), Edgard Ceccarelli (FRA)

2 March 2026 2027 FIBA World Cup qualifiers – 1st round	Spain	78–64	Ukraine	Oviedo, Spain
20:30 CET (UTC+1)	Scoring by quarter: 16–9, 12–12, 24–22, 26–21
	Pts: Alonso 12; Rebs: Oriola 8 Asts: Cárdenas 7	Boxscore	Pts: Voinalovych 12; Rebs: Lypovyy, Shelist 5 Asts: Kovliar 5	Arena: Palacio de los Deportes de Oviedo; Attendance: 5,261; Referees: Martin Vulić (CRO), Dariusz Zapolski (POL), Orhan Çağrı Hekimoğlu (TUR)

2 July 2026 2027 FIBA World Cup qualifiers – 1st round	Spain	109–81	Denmark	Madrid, Spain
19:00 CEST (UTC+2)	Scoring by quarter: 24–19, 27–22, 31–14, 27–26
	Pts: Oriola 20; Rebs: Oriola, Pradilla 6 Asts: Cárdenas 8	Boxscore	Pts: Ballisager-Webb 14; Rebs: Ballisager-Webb 7 Asts: Heede-Andersen 6	Arena: Caja Mágica; Attendance: 6,685; Referees: Boris Krejić (SVN), Valerio Grigioni (ITA), Silvia Marziali (ITA)

5 July 2026 2027 FIBA World Cup qualifiers – 1st round	Georgia	91–89(OT)	Spain	Tbilisi, Georgia
19:30 (UTC+4)	Scoring by quarter: 14–32, 24–20, 19–19, 26–12, Overtime: 8–6
	Pts: Shengelia 37; Rebs: Shengelia 10; Asts: Reed 7	Boxscore	Pts: W. Hernangómez 19; Rebs: W. Hernangómez, Pradilla 8 Asts: Brizuela, Cárdenas 4	Arena: Tbilisi Arena; Attendance: 8,000; Referees: Mārtiņš Kozlovskis (LAT), Josip Jurčević (CRO), Andrea Bongiorni (ITA)

28 August 2026 2027 FIBA World Cup qualifiers – 2nd round	Spain	89–95	Portugal	Zaragoza, Spain
21:00 CEST (UTC+2)	Scoring by quarter: 14–21, 27–26, 30–24, 18–24
	Pts: Brizuela 19; Rebs: J. Hernangómez 7 Asts: Brizuela 5	Boxscore	Pts: Williams 22; Rebs: Queta 9 Asts: Lisboa 4	Arena: Pabellón Príncipe Felipe; Attendance: 6,103; Referees: Gatis Saliņš (LAT), Juozas Barkauskas (LTU), Mehmet Şahin (TUR)

31 August 2026 2027 FIBA World Cup qualifiers – 2nd round	Greece	108–106(OT)	Spain	Athens, Greece
19:00 EEST (UTC+3)	Scoring by quarter: 19–20, 24–22, 24–16, 19–28, Overtime: 22–20
	Pts: Dorsey, Mitoglou 29; Rebs: Mitoglou 7 Asts: Calathes 8	Boxscore	Pts: Parra 18; Rebs: Mara 13; Asts: Cárdenas 8	Arena: Telekom Center Athens; Attendance: 17,677; Referees: Wojciech Liszka (POL), Martin Vulić (CRO), Michał Proc (POL)

26 November 2026 2027 FIBA World Cup qualifiers – 2nd round	Montenegro	vs.	Spain	Podgorica, Montenegro
19:00 CET (UTC+1)
		Boxscore		Arena: Morača Sports Center

29 November 2026 2027 FIBA World Cup qualifiers – 2nd round	Spain	vs.	Greece	Santiago, Spain
18:00 CET (UTC+1)
		Boxscore		Arena: Pavillón Multiusos Fontes do Sar

=== 2027 ===
26 February 2027 2027 FIBA World Cup qualifiers – 2nd round	Portugal	vs.	Spain	Portugal
--:-- WET (UTC+0)
		Boxscore

1 March 2027 2027 FIBA World Cup qualifiers – 2nd round	Spain	vs.	Montenegro	Spain
--:-- CET (UTC+1)
		Boxscore

== Team ==
=== Current roster ===
Roster for the 2027 FIBA World Cup Qualifiers matches on 28 and 31 August 2026 against Portugal and Greece.

Spain men's national basketball team roster
Players
Coaches

Pos.	No.	Name	Age – Date of birth	Height	Club	Ctr.
PG	1	Álvaro Cárdenas	24 – 29 April 2002	1.91 m (6 ft 3 in)	Valencia	(Spain)
F	2	Baba Miller	22 – 7 February 2004	2.08 m (6 ft 10 in)	Los Angeles Clippers	(United States)
G	3	Sergio de Larrea	20 – 4 December 2005	1.98 m (6 ft 6 in)	Dallas Mavericks	(United States)
PF	4	Jaime Pradilla	25 – 3 January 2001	2.02 m (6 ft 8 in)	Real Madrid	(Spain)
PG	5	Mario Saint-Supéry	20 – 14 April 2006	1.90 m (6 ft 3 in)	Valencia	(Spain)
SG	8	Darío Brizuela	31 – 8 November 1994	1.88 m (6 ft 2 in)	Barcelona	(Spain)
PG	9	Alberto Díaz	32 – 23 April 1994	1.90 m (6 ft 3 in)	Unicaja	(Spain)
SF	10	Hugo González	20 – 5 February 2006	1.98 m (6 ft 6 in)	Boston Celtics	(United States)
C	14	Willy Hernangómez (C)	32 – 27 May 1994	2.09 m (6 ft 10 in)	Unicaja	(Spain)
C	15	Aday Mara	21 – 7 April 2005	2.20 m (7 ft 3 in)	Oklahoma City Thunder	(United States)
G/F	22	Santi Yusta	29 – 28 April 1997	1.98 m (6 ft 6 in)	Anadolu Efes	(Turkey)
F	41	Juancho Hernangómez	30 – 28 September 1995	2.06 m (6 ft 9 in)	Panathinaikos	(Greece)
F	44	Joel Parra	26 – 4 April 2000	2.02 m (6 ft 8 in)	Barcelona	(Spain)

Head coach

- (Spain) Chus Mateo

Assistant coach(es)

- (Spain) Guillermo Frutos
- (Spain) Paco Aurioles
- (Spain) Arturo Ruiz

Legend

- **(C)** Team captain
- **Club** – describes last
  club before the competition
- **Age** – describes age
  on 28 August 2026

==== Depth chart ====
Pos.	Starting 5	Bench 1	Bench 2	Bench 3	Inactive
C	**Aday Mara**	Usman Garuba	Willy Hernangómez	Fran Guerra	Izan Almansa
PF	**Santi Aldama**	Juancho Hernangómez	Jaime Pradilla	Baba Miller	Tyson Pérez
SF	**Hugo González**	Alberto Abalde	Joel Parra	Josep Puerto	Jonathan Barreiro
SG	**Dario Brizuela**	Santiago Yusta	Alberto Díaz	Jaime Fernández	Xabier López-Arostegui
PG	**Lorenzo Brown**	Sergio de Larrea	Mario Saint-Supéry	Álvaro Cárdenas	Juan Núñez

=== Past rosters ===
1935 EuroBasket: finished (silver) among 10 teams

2 Juan Carbonell, 3 Pedro Alonso, 4 Emilio Alonso, 5 Cayetano Ortega, 6 Rafael Ruano, 7 Rafael Martín (MVP), 8 Armando Maunier, 9 Fernando Muscat (Coach: Mariano Manent)

1950 FIBA World Cup: finished 9th among 10 teams

3 Arturo Imedio, 4 Jaime Basso, 5 Andrés Oller, 6 Álvaro Salvadores, 7 Juan Dalmau, 8 Julio Gámez, 9 Eduardo Kucharski, 10 Ángel González, 11 Ángel Lozano, 12 Domingo Bárcenas, 13 Juan Ferrando, 14 Ignacio Pinedo (Coach: Michael Paul Rutzgis)

1959 EuroBasket: finished 15th among 17 teams

3 Alfonso Martínez, 4 José Luis Martínez Gómez, 5 Francisco Capel, 6 Jorge Parra, 7 Joaquín Hernández Gallego, 8 José Lluis, 9 José Brunet, 10 Emiliano Rodríguez, 11 Juan Canals, 12 Francisco Buscató, 13 Francisco Borrell, 14 Arturo Auladell (Coach: Gabriel Alberti)

1960 Olympic Games: finished 14th among 16 teams

3 Agustín Bertomeu, 4 José Nora, 5 Alfonso Martínez, 6 Joaquín Enseñat, 7 Santiago Navarro, 8 José Lluis, 9 Jorge Guillén, 10 Emiliano Rodríguez, 11 Jesús "Chus" Codina, 12 Miguel Ángel González, 13 Francisco Buscató, 14 Juan Martos (Coach: Eduardo Kucharski González)

1961 EuroBasket: finished 13th among 19 teams

4 Santiago Navarro, 5 Lorenzo Alocén, 6 Juan Martos, 7 Jesús "Chus" Codina, 8 José Lluis, 9 José Nora, 10 Emiliano Rodríguez, 11 Alfonso Martínez, 12 Carlos Sevillano, 13 Francisco Buscató, 14 Lolo Sainz, 15 Javier Sanjuán (Coach: Fernando Font)

1963 EuroBasket: finished 7th among 16 teams

4 Juan Antonio Martínez Arroyo, 5 Moncho Monsalve, 6 Miguel Ángel González, 7 Jesús "Chus" Codina, 8 José Lluis, 9 Arturo Auladell, 10 Emiliano Rodríguez (MVP), 11 Carlos Sevillano, 12 Alfonso Martínez, 13 Francisco Buscató, 14 Lolo Sainz, 15 José Ramón Ramos (Coach: Joaquín Hernández Gallego)

1965 EuroBasket: finished 11th among 16 teams

4 Juan Antonio Martínez Arroyo, 5 Joan Fa Busquets, 6 Miguel Ángel González, 7 Lolo Sainz, 8 José Lluis, 9 Enrique Margall, 10 Emiliano Rodríguez, 11 Carlos Sevillano, 12 Juan Bautista Urberuaga, 13 Francisco Buscató, 14 Moncho Monsalve, 15 José Ramón Ramos (Coach: Pedro Ferrandiz González)

1967 EuroBasket: finished 10th among 16 teams

4 Ramón Guardiola, 5 Ángel Serrano, 6 Carlos Luquero, 7 Enrique Margall, 8 José Luis Sagi-Vela, 9 Antonio "Toncho" Nava, 10 Emiliano Rodríguez, 11 José Laso, 12 Alfonso Martínez, 13 Francisco Buscató, 14 Moncho Monsalve, 15 José Ramón Ramos (Coach: Antonio Díaz-Miguel)

1968 Olympic Games: finished 7th among 16 teams

4 Juan Antonio Martínez Arroyo, 5 Vicente Ramos Cecilio, 6 Luis Carlos Santiago, 7 Jesús "Chus" Codina, 8 Enrique Margall, 9 Antonio "Toncho" Nava, 10 Emiliano Rodríguez, 11 Clifford Luyk, 12 José Luis Sagi-Vela, 13 Francisco Buscató, 14 Lorenzo Alocén, 15 Alfonso Martínez (Coach: Antonio Díaz-Miguel)

1969 EuroBasket: finished 5th among 12 teams

4 Víctor Escorial, 5 Vicente Ramos Cecilio, 6 Cristóbal Rodríguez, 7 Jesús Codina, 8 Enrique Margall, 9 Antonio Nava, 10 Emiliano Rodríguez, 11 Clifford Luyk, 12 José Luis Sagi-Vela, 13 Francisco Buscató, 14 Lorenzo Alocén, 15 Alfonso Martínez (Coach: Antonio Díaz-Miguel)

1971 EuroBasket: finished 7th among 12 teams

4 Juan Antonio Martínez Arroyo, 5 Vicente Ramos Cecilio, 6 Alfonso Martínez, 7 Enrique Margall, 8 Rafael Rullán, 9 Luis Miguel Santillana, 10 Emiliano Rodríguez, 11 Francisco Buscató, 12 José Luis Sagi-Vela, 13 Clifford Luyk, 14 Wayne Brabender, 15 Cristóbal Rodríguez (Coach: Antonio Díaz-Miguel)

1972 Olympic Games: finished 11th among 16 teams

4 Wayne Brabender, 5 Vicente Ramos Cecilio, 6 Carmelo Cabrera, 7 Enrique Margall, 8 Luis Miguel Santillana, 9 Jesús Iradier, 10 Francisco Buscató, 11 Juan Antonio Corbalán, 12 Rafael Rullán, 13 Clifford Luyk, 14 Miguel Ángel Estrada, 15 Gonzalo Sagi-Vela (Coach: Antonio Díaz-Miguel)

1973 EuroBasket: finished (silver) among 12 teams

4 Wayne Brabender (MVP), 5 Vicente Ramos Cecilio, 6 Carmelo Cabrera, 7 Enrique Margall, 8 Luis Miguel Santillana, 9 Rafael Rullán, 10 Francisco Buscató, 11 Manuel Flores, 12 José Luis Sagi-Vela, 13 Clifford Luyk, 14 Miguel Ángel Estrada, 15 Gonzalo Sagi-Vela (Coach: Antonio Díaz-Miguel)

1974 FIBA World Cup: finished 5th among 14 teams

4 Wayne Brabender, 5 Vicente Ramos Cecilio, 6 Cristóbal Rodríguez, 7 Carmelo Cabrera, 8 Luis Miguel Santillana, 9 Rafael Rullán, 10 Jesús Iradier, 11 Juan Antonio Corbalán, 12 José Luis Sagi-Vela, 13 Clifford Luyk, 14 Miguel Ángel Estrada, 15 Manuel Flores (Coach: Antonio Díaz-Miguel)

1975 EuroBasket: finished 4th among 12 teams

4 Wayne Brabender, 5 Miguel Ángel Lopez-Abril, 6 Cristóbal Rodríguez, 7 Carmelo Cabrera, 8 Luis Miguel Santillana, 9 Joan Filbá, 10 Jesús Iradier, 11 Juan Antonio Corbalán, 12 Rafael Rullán, 13 Clifford Luyk, 14 Miguel Ángel Estrada, 15 Manuel Flores (Coach: Antonio Díaz-Miguel)

1977 EuroBasket: finished 9th among 12 teams

4 Wayne Brabender, 5 Juan Domingo de la Cruz, 6 Juan Ramón Fernández, 7 Carmelo Cabrera, 8 Luis Miguel Santillana, 9 Joan Filbá, 10 Luis María Prada, 11 Juan Antonio Corbalán, 12 Rafael Rullán, 13 Josep Maria Margall, 14 Gonzalo Sagi-Vela, 15 Manuel Flores (Coach: Antonio Díaz-Miguel)

1979 EuroBasket: finished 6th among 12 teams

4 Wayne Brabender, 5 Quim Costa, 6 José Luis Llorente, 7 Josep Maria Margall, 8 Manuel Flores, 9 Pedro César Ansa, 10 Luis Miguel Santillana, 11 Juan Antonio Corbalán, 12 Rafael Rullán, 13 Juan Domingo de la Cruz, 14 Juan Manuel López Iturriaga, 15 Juan Antonio "Epi" San Epifanio (Coach: Antonio Díaz-Miguel)

1980 Olympic Games: finished 4th among 12 teams

4 Wayne Brabender, 5 José Luis Llorente, 6 Cándido "Chicho" Sibilio, 7 Josep Maria Margall, 8 Manuel Flores, 9 Fernando Romay, 10 Luis Miguel Santillana, 11 Juan Antonio Corbalán, 12 Ignacio "Nacho" Solozábal, 13 Juan Domingo de la Cruz, 14 Juan Manuel López Iturriaga, 15 Juan Antonio "Epi" San Epifanio (Coach: Antonio Díaz-Miguel)

1981 EuroBasket: finished 4th among 12 teams

4 Wayne Brabender, 5 Quim Costa, 6 Cándido "Chicho" Sibilio, 7 Josep Maria Margall, 8 Manuel Flores, 9 Fernando Romay, 10 Fernando Martín, 11 Juan Antonio Corbalán, 12 Rafael Rullán, 13 Juan Domingo de la Cruz, 14 Ignacio "Nacho" Solozábal, 15 Juan Antonio "Epi" San Epifanio (Coach: Antonio Díaz-Miguel)

1982 FIBA World Cup: finished 4th among 13 teams

4 Wayne Brabender, 5 Quim Costa, 6 Cándido "Chicho" Sibilio, 7 Josep Maria Margall, 8 Andrés Jiménez Fernández, 9 Fernando Romay, 10 Fernando Martín, 11 Juan Antonio Corbalán, 12 Ignacio "Nacho" Solozábal, 13 Juan Domingo de la Cruz, 14 Juan Manuel López Iturriaga, 15 Juan Antonio "Epi" San Epifanio (Coach: Antonio Díaz-Miguel)

1983 EuroBasket: finished (silver) among 12 teams

4 Fernando Arcega, 5 Joan "Chichi" Creus, 6 Cándido "Chicho" Sibilio, 7 Josep Maria Margall, 8 Andrés Jiménez Fernández, 9 Fernando Romay, 10 Fernando Martín, 11 Juan Antonio Corbalán (MVP), 12 Ignacio "Nacho" Solozábal, 13 Juan Domingo de la Cruz, 14 Juan Manuel López Iturriaga, 15 Juan Antonio "Epi" San Epifanio (Coach: Antonio Díaz-Miguel)

1984 Olympic Games: finished (silver) among 12 teams

4 José Manuel Beirán, 5 José Luis Llorente, 6 Fernando Arcega, 7 Josep Maria Margall, 8 Andrés Jiménez Fernández, 9 Fernando Romay, 10 Fernando Martín, 11 Juan Antonio Corbalán, 12 Ignacio "Nacho" Solozábal, 13 Juan Domingo de la Cruz, 14 Juan Manuel López Iturriaga, 15 Juan Antonio "Epi" San Epifanio (Coach: Antonio Díaz-Miguel)

1985 EuroBasket: finished 4th among 12 teams

4 Jordi Villacampa, 5 José Luis Llorente, 6 Cándido "Chicho" Sibilio, 7 Josep Maria Margall, 8 Andrés Jiménez Fernández, 9 Fernando Romay, 10 Fernando Martín, 11 Vicente Gil, 12 Quim Costa, 13 Juan Domingo de la Cruz, 14 Juan Manuel López Iturriaga, 15 Juan Antonio "Epi" San Epifanio (Coach: Antonio Díaz-Miguel)

1986 FIBA World Cup: finished 5th among 24 teams

4 Jordi Villacampa, 5 Quim Costa, 6 Cándido "Chicho" Sibilio, 7 Josep Maria Margall, 8 Andrés Jiménez Fernández, 9 Fernando Romay, 10 Fernando Martín, 11 Fernando Arcega, 12 Ignacio "Nacho" Solozábal, 13 Juan Domingo de la Cruz, 14 Joan "Chichi" Creus, 15 Juan Antonio "Epi" San Epifanio (Coach: Antonio Díaz-Miguel)

1987 EuroBasket: finished 4th among 12 teams

4 Jordi Villacampa, 5 Francisco Javier Zapata, 6 Cándido "Chicho" Sibilio, 7 Josep Maria Margall, 8 Andrés Jiménez Fernández, 9 Fernando Romay, 10 José Antonio Montero, 11 Fernando Arcega, 12 Ignacio Solozábal, 13 Ferran Martínez, 14 José Ángel Arcega, 15 Juan Antonio "Epi" San Epifanio (Coach: Antonio Díaz-Miguel)

1988 Olympic Games: finished 8th among 12 teams

4 Jordi Villacampa, 5 José Luis Llorente, 6 José Biriukov, 7 Josep Maria Margall, 8 Andrés Jiménez Fernández, 9 Enrique “Quique” Andreu, 10 José Antonio Montero, 11 Fernando Arcega, 12 Ignacio Solozábal, 13 Ferran Martínez, 14 Antonio Martín Espina, 15 Juan Antonio "Epi" San Epifanio (Coach: Antonio Díaz-Miguel)

1989 EuroBasket: finished 5th among 8 teams

4 Rafael Vecina, 5 José Ángel Arcega, 6 José Biriukov, 7 Pablo Laso, 8 Andrés Jiménez Fernández, 9 Enrique “Quique” Andreu, 10 José Antonio Montero, 11 Enrique Villalobos, 12 Juan Antonio Morales, 13 Ferran Martínez, 14 Manuel Ángel Aller, 15 Juan Antonio "Epi" San Epifanio (Coach: Antonio Díaz-Miguel)

1990 FIBA World Cup: finished 10th among 16 teams

4 Jordi Villacampa, 5 José Angel Arcega, 6 José Miguel Antúnez, 7 Rafael Jofresa, 8 Andrés Jiménez Fernández, 9 Fernando Romay, 10 José Antonio Montero, 11 Alberto Herreros, 12 Manel Bosch, 13 Ferran Martínez, 14 Enrique Andreu, 15 Francisco J. Zapata (Coach: Antonio Díaz-Miguel)

1991 EuroBasket: finished (bronze) among 8 teams

4 Jordi Villacampa, 5 Mike Hansen, 6 José Miguel Antúnez, 7 Rafael Jofresa, 8 Enrique “Quique” Andreu, 9 Manel Bosch, 10 Josep “Pep” Cargol, 11 Fernando Arcega, 12 Juan Antonio Orenga, 13 Silvano Bustos, 14 Antonio Martín Espina, 15 Juan Antonio "Epi" San Epifanio (Coach: Antonio Díaz-Miguel)

1992 Olympic Games: finished 9th among 12 teams

4 Jordi Villacampa, 5 José Arcega, 6 José Biriukov, 7 Rafael Jofresa, 8 Andrés Jiménez, 9 Santiago Aldama, 10 Tomás Jofresa, 11 Xavi Fernández, 12 Alberto Herreros, 13 Juan Antonio Orenga, 14 Enrique Andreu, 15 Juan Antonio "Epi" San Epifanio (Coach: Antonio Díaz-Miguel)

1993 EuroBasket: finished 5th among 16 teams

4 Jordi Villacampa, 5 Rafael Jofresa, 6 Tomas Jofresa, 7 Juan Antonio Orenga, 8 Andrés Jiménez, 9 Juan Antonio Morales, 10 Ignacio “Nacho” Azofra, 11 Alberto Herreros, 12 Xavier “Xavi” Crespo, 13 Ferran Martínez, 14 Antonio Martín Espina, 15 Juan Antonio "Epi" San Epifanio (Coach: Lolo Sainz)

1994 FIBA World Cup: finished 10th among 16 teams

4 Andrés Jiménez, 5 Enrique Andreu, 6 Alberto Herreros, 7 José Cargol, 8 Ferran Martínez, 9 Juan Antonio Orenga, 10 José Miguel Antúnez, 11 Rafael Vecina, 12 Rafael Jofresa, 13 Pablo Laso, 14 Juan Antonio "Epi" San Epifanio, 15 Jordi Villacampa (Coach: Lolo Sainz)

1995 EuroBasket: finished 6th among 14 teams

4 Alberto Angulo, 5 José Luis Galilea, 6 Mike Smith, 7 Juan Antonio Orenga, 8 Ignacio Rodríguez, 9 Pablo Laso, 10 Xavi Fernández, 11 Alberto Herreros, 12 Alfonso Reyes, 13 Ferran Martínez, 14 Antonio Martín Espina, 15 Fran Murcia (Coach: Lolo Sainz)

1997 EuroBasket: finished 5th among 16 teams

4 Alberto Angulo, 5 José Luis Galilea, 6 Tomás Jofresa, 7 Juan Antonio Orenga, 8 Ignacio Rodríguez, 9 Mike Smith, 10 Roger Esteller, 11 Alberto Herreros, 12 José Antonio Paraíso, 13 Ferran Martínez, 14 Alfonso Reyes, 15 Roberto Dueñas (Coach: Lolo Sainz)

1998 FIBA World Cup: finished 5th among 16 teams

4 Alberto Angulo, 5 Nacho Rodilla, 6 Nacho Azofra, 7 Juan Antonio Orenga, 8 Ignacio Rodríguez, 9 Carlos Jiménez, 10 Rodrigo De la Fuente, 11 Alberto Herreros, 12 José Antonio Paraíso, 13 Iñaki de Miguel, 14 Alfonso Reyes, 15 Roberto Dueñas (Coach: Lolo Sainz)

1999 EuroBasket: finished (silver) among 16 teams

4 Alberto Angulo, 5 Nacho Rodilla, 6 Iván Corrales, 7 Ignacio Romero, 8 Ignacio Rodríguez, 9 Carlos Jiménez, 10 Rodrigo De la Fuente, 11 Alberto Herreros, 12 Roger Esteller, 13 Iñaki de Miguel, 14 Alfonso Reyes, 15 Roberto Dueñas (Coach: Lolo Sainz)

2000 Olympic Games: finished 9th among 12 teams

4 Alberto Angulo, 5 Juan Carlos Navarro, 6 Raúl López, 7 Jorge Garbajosa, 8 Ignacio Rodríguez, 9 Carlos Jiménez, 10 Rodrigo De la Fuente, 11 Alberto Herreros, 12 Johnny Rogers, 13 Iñaki de Miguel, 14 Alfonso Reyes, 15 Roberto Dueñas (Coach: Lolo Sainz)

2001 EuroBasket: finished (bronze) among 16 teams

4 Pau Gasol, 5 Chuck Kornegay, 6 Paco Vázquez, 7 Juan Carlos Navarro, 8 Ignacio Rodríguez, 9 Felipe Reyes, 10 Carlos Jiménez, 11 Lucio Angulo, 12 José Antonio Paraíso, 13 Raúl López, 14 Alfonso Reyes, 15 Jorge Garbajosa (Coach: Javier Imbroda)

2002 FIBA World Cup: finished 5th among 16 teams

4 Pau Gasol, 5 Oriol Junyent, 6 Carles Marco, 7 Juan Carlos Navarro, 8 Ignacio Rodríguez, 9 Felipe Reyes, 10 Carlos Jiménez, 11 Lucio Angulo, 12 José Antonio Paraíso, 13 José Calderón, 14 Alfonso Reyes, 15 Jorge Garbajosa (Coach: Javier Imbroda)

2003 EuroBasket: finished (silver) among 16 teams

4 Pau Gasol, 5 Roger Grimau, 6 Carles Marco, 7 Juan Carlos Navarro, 8 José Calderón, 9 Felipe Reyes, 10 Carlos Jiménez, 11 Alberto Herreros, 12 Rodrigo de la Fuente, 13 Antonio Bueno, 14 Alfonso Reyes, 15 Jorge Garbajosa (Coach: Moncho López)

2004 Olympic Games: finished 7th among 12 teams

4 Pau Gasol, 5 Iker Iturbe, 6 Jaume Comas, 7 Juan Carlos Navarro, 8 José Calderón, 9 Felipe Reyes, 10 Carlos Jiménez (C), 11 Óscar Yebra, 12 Roberto Dueñas, 13 Rudy Fernández, 14 Rodrigo De la Fuente, 15 Jorge Garbajosa (Coach: Mario Pesquera)

2005 EuroBasket: finished 4th among 16 teams

4 Rudy Fernández, 5 Iker Iturbe, 6 Carlos Cabezas, 7 Juan Carlos Navarro, 8 José Calderón, 9 Felipe Reyes, 10 Carlos Jiménez, 11 Sergi Vidal, 12 Sergio Rodríguez, 13 Iñaki de Miguel, 14 Fran Vázquez, 15 Jorge Garbajosa (Coach: Mario Pesquera)

2006 FIBA World Cup: finished (gold) among 24 teams

4 Pau Gasol (MVP), 5 Rudy Fernández, 6 Carlos Cabezas, 7 Juan Carlos Navarro, 8 José Calderón, 9 Felipe Reyes, 10 Carlos Jiménez, 11 Sergio Rodríguez, 12 Berni Rodríguez, 13 Marc Gasol, 14 Álex Mumbrú, 15 Jorge Garbajosa (Coach: Pepu Hernández)

2007 EuroBasket: finished (silver) among 16 teams

4 Pau Gasol, 5 Rudy Fernández, 6 Carlos Cabezas, 7 Juan Carlos Navarro, 8 José Calderón, 9 Felipe Reyes, 10 Carlos Jiménez, 11 Sergio Rodríguez, 12 Berni Rodríguez, 13 Marc Gasol, 14 Álex Mumbrú, 15 Jorge Garbajosa (Coach: Pepu Hernández)

2008 Olympic Games: finished (silver) among 12 teams

4 Pau Gasol, 5 Rudy Fernández, 6 Ricky Rubio, 7 Juan Carlos Navarro, 8 José Calderón, 9 Felipe Reyes, 10 Carlos Jiménez, 11 Raül López, 12 Berni Rodríguez, 13 Marc Gasol, 14 Álex Mumbrú, 15 Jorge Garbajosa (Coach: Aíto García Reneses)

2009 EuroBasket: finished (gold) among 16 teams

4 Pau Gasol (MVP), 5 Rudy Fernández, 6 Ricky Rubio, 7 Juan Carlos Navarro, 8 Víctor Claver, 9 Felipe Reyes, 10 Carlos Cabezas, 11 Raül López, 12 Sergio Llull, 13 Marc Gasol, 14 Álex Mumbrú, 15 Jorge Garbajosa (Coach: Sergio Scariolo)

2010 FIBA World Cup: finished 6th among 24 teams

4 Fernando San Emeterio, 5 Rudy Fernández, 6 Ricky Rubio, 7 Juan Carlos Navarro, 8 Raül López, 9 Felipe Reyes, 10 Víctor Claver, 11 Fran Vázquez, 12 Sergio Llull, 13 Marc Gasol, 14 Álex Mumbrú, 15 Jorge Garbajosa (Coach: Sergio Scariolo)

2011 EuroBasket: finished (gold) among 16 teams

4 Pau Gasol, 5 Rudy Fernández, 6 Ricky Rubio, 7 Juan Carlos Navarro (C) & (MVP), 8 José Calderón, 9 Felipe Reyes, 10 Víctor Claver, 11 Fernando San Emeterio, 12 Sergio Llull, 13 Marc Gasol, 14 Serge Ibaka, 15 Víctor Sada (Coach: Sergio Scariolo)

2012 Olympic Games: finished (silver) among 12 teams

4 Pau Gasol, 5 Rudy Fernández, 6 Sergio Rodríguez, 7 Juan Carlos Navarro (C), 8 José Calderón, 9 Felipe Reyes, 10 Víctor Claver, 11 Fernando San Emeterio, 12 Sergio Llull, 13 Marc Gasol, 14 Serge Ibaka, 15 Víctor Sada (Coach: Sergio Scariolo)

2013 Eurobasket: finished (bronze) among 24 teams

4 Pablo Aguilar, 5 Rudy Fernández, 6 Sergio Rodríguez, 7 Xavi Rey, 8 José Calderón, 9 Ricky Rubio, 10 Víctor Claver, 11 Fernando San Emeterio, 12 Sergio Llull, 13 Marc Gasol, 14 Germán Gabriel, 15 Álex Mumbrú (Coach: Juan Antonio Orenga)

2014 FIBA World Cup: finished 5th among 24 teams

4 Pau Gasol, 5 Rudy Fernández, 6 Sergio Rodríguez, 7 Juan Carlos Navarro (C), 8 José Calderón, 9 Felipe Reyes, 10 Víctor Claver, 11 Ricky Rubio, 12 Sergio Llull, 13 Marc Gasol, 14 Serge Ibaka, 15 Álex Abrines (Coach: Juan Antonio Orenga)

2015 EuroBasket: finished (gold) among 24 teams

4 Pau Gasol (MVP), 5 Rudy Fernández, 6 Sergio Rodríguez, 7 Willy Hernangómez, 8 Pau Ribas, 9 Felipe Reyes, 10 Víctor Claver, 11 Fernando San Emeterio, 12 Sergio Llull, 13 Pablo Aguilar, 14 Nikola Mirotić, 15 Guillem Vives (Coach: Sergio Scariolo)

2016 Olympic Games: finished (bronze) among 12 teams

4 Pau Gasol, 5 Rudy Fernández, 6 Sergio Rodríguez, 7 Juan Carlos Navarro (C), 8 José Calderón, 9 Felipe Reyes, 10 Víctor Claver, 14 Willy Hernangómez, 21 Álex Abrines, 23 Sergio Llull, 44 Nikola Mirotić, 79 Ricky Rubio (Coach: Sergio Scariolo)

2017 EuroBasket: finished (bronze) among 24 teams

4 Pau Gasol, 6 Sergio Rodríguez, 7 Juan Carlos Navarro (C), 9 Ricky Rubio, 13 Marc Gasol, 14 Willy Hernangómez, 15 Joan Sastre, 16 Guillem Vives, 18 Pierre Oriola, 19 Fernando San Emeterio, 21 Álex Abrines, 41 Juancho Hernangómez (Coach: Sergio Scariolo)

2019 FIBA World Cup: finished (gold) among 32 teams

1 Quino Colom, 5 Rudy Fernández (C), 8 Pau Ribas, 9 Ricky Rubio (MVP), 10 Víctor Claver, 13 Marc Gasol, 14 Willy Hernangómez, 18 Pierre Oriola, 22 Xavi Rabaseda, 23 Sergio Llull, 33 Javier Beirán, 41 Juancho Hernangómez (Coach: Sergio Scariolo)

2020 Olympic Games: finished 6th among 12 teams

3 Xabier López-Arostegui, 4 Pau Gasol, 5 Rudy Fernández (C), 6 Sergio Rodríguez, 9 Ricky Rubio, 10 Víctor Claver, 13 Marc Gasol, 14 Willy Hernangómez, 16 Usman Garuba, 20 Alberto Abalde, 21 Álex Abrines, 23 Sergio Llull (Coach: Sergio Scariolo)

2022 EuroBasket: finished (gold) among 24 teams

2 Lorenzo Brown, 4 Jaime Pradilla, 5 Rudy Fernández (C), 6 Xabier López-Arostegui, 7 Jaime Fernández, 8 Darío Brizuela, 9 Alberto Díaz, 11 Sebas Saiz, 14 Willy Hernangómez (MVP), 16 Usman Garuba, 41 Juancho Hernangómez, 44 Joel Parra (Coach: Sergio Scariolo)

2023 FIBA World Cup: finished 9th among 32 teams

4 Alberto Díaz, 5 Rudy Fernández (C), 8 Darío Brizuela, 10 Víctor Claver, 12 Santi Aldama, 14 Willy Hernangómez, 16 Usman Garuba, 21 Álex Abrines, 23 Sergio Llull, 24 Juan Núñez, 41 Juancho Hernangómez, 44 Joel Parra (Coach: Sergio Scariolo)

2024 Olympic Games: finished 10th among 12 teams

2 Lorenzo Brown, 4 Jaime Pradilla, 5 Rudy Fernández (C), 6 Xabier López-Arostegui, 7 Santi Aldama, 8 Darío Brizuela, 9 Alberto Díaz, 10 Juancho Hernangómez, 14 Willy Hernangómez, 16 Usman Garuba, 21 Álex Abrines, 23 Sergio Llull (Coach: Sergio Scariolo)

2025 EuroBasket: finished 17th among 24 teams

2 Josep Puerto, 3 Sergio de Larrea, 4 Jaime Pradilla, 5 Mario Saint-Supéry, 6 Xabier López-Arostegui, 7 Santi Aldama, 8 Darío Brizuela, 14 Willy Hernangómez (C), 22 Santiago Yusta, 41 Juancho Hernangómez, 44 Joel Parra, 77 Yankuba Sima (Coach: Sergio Scariolo)

=== Statistics ===
- **Bold** denotes players still playing international basketball.

As of 2 August 2024, including all friendly matches

==== Most capped players ====
#	Player	National career	Matches	Points
1	Rudy Fernández	2004–2024	266	2161
2	Juan Carlos Navarro	2000–2017	253	2796
3	Epi	1979–1994	239	3330
4	Felipe Reyes	2001–2016	236	1715
5	Nino Buscató	1959–1973	222	1913
6	Pau Gasol	2001–2021	216	3656
7	José Manuel Calderón	2002–2016	193	1233
8	Marc Gasol	2006–2021	191	1850
9	Wayne Brabender	1969–1982	190	2861
10	Josep Maria Margall	1975–1988	188	1030

==== Top scorers ====
#	Player	National career	Points	Matches	Average
1	Pau Gasol	2001–2021	3656	216	16.9
2	Epi	1979–1994	3330	239	13.9
3	Wayne Brabender	1969–1982	2861	190	15.1
4	Emiliano Rodríguez	1959–1971	2842	175	16.2
5	Juan Carlos Navarro	2000–2017	2796	253	11.1
6	Andrés Jiménez	1982–1994	2393	187	12.8
7	Rudy Fernández	2004–2024	2161	266	8.2
8	Clifford Luyk	1966–1976	2021	150	13.5
9	Alberto Herreros	1990–2003	2003	172	11.6
10	Nino Buscató	1959–1973	1913	222	8.6

==== Top highscorers ====
Top highscorers in official games (friendlies not included).

As of 23 February 2025

PLAYER	PTS	OPPONENT	EVENT	DATE	LOCATION
Jordi Villacampa	48	Venezuela	1990 World Cup Classification Round	1990.08.15	Salta (ARG)
Jordi Bonareu	45	Italy	1955 Mediterranean Games Main Round	1955.07.22	Barcelona (ESP)
Emiliano Rodríguez	43	Netherlands	1967 EuroBasket 1st Round	1967.10.05	Helsinki (FIN)
Pau Gasol	40	France	2015 EuroBasket Semifinal	2015.09.17	Lille (FRA)
Wayne Brabender	40	France	1980 Olympics qualification	1980.05.14	Geneva (SUI)
Ricky Rubio	38	United States	2020 Olympics Quarterfinal	2021.08.03	Saitama (JPN)
Pau Gasol	37	China	2004 Olympics Classification Round	2004.08.28	Athens (GRE)
Wayne Brabender	37	Philippines	1974 World Cup 1st Round	1974.07.05	Ponce (PUR)
Emiliano Rodríguez	37	East Germany	1963 EuroBasket 1st Round	1963.10.09	Wroclaw (POL)
Juan Carlos Navarro	36	Croatia	2005 EuroBasket Quarterfinal	2005.09.23	Novi Sad (SRB)
Pau Gasol	36	Lithuania	2003 EuroBasket Final	2003.09.14	Södertälje (SWE)
Epi	36	West Germany	1985 EuroBasket Quarterfinal	1985.06.11	Sttutgart (GER)

==== Top medallists ====
Most medals won with the senior national team in (Olympic Games, World Cups and EuroBaskets):

Player	Medals	Details
Rudy Fernández	11	Extended content: (gold) 2006 FIBA World Cup; (silver) 2007 EuroBasket; (silver) 2008 Summer Olympics; (gold) 2009 EuroBasket; (gold) 2011 EuroBasket; (silver) 2012 Summer Olympics; (bronze) 2013 EuroBasket; (gold) 2015 EuroBasket; (bronze) 2016 Summer Olympics; (gold) 2019 FIBA World Cup; (gold) 2022 EuroBasket
Pau Gasol	11	Extended content: (bronze) 2001 EuroBasket; (silver) 2003 EuroBasket; (gold) 2006 FIBA World Cup; (silver) 2007 EuroBasket; (silver) 2008 Summer Olympics; (gold) 2009 EuroBasket; (gold) 2011 EuroBasket; (silver) 2012 Summer Olympics; (gold) 2015 EuroBasket; (bronze) 2016 Summer Olympics; (bronze) 2017 EuroBasket
Felipe Reyes	10	Extended content: (bronze) 2001 EuroBasket; (silver) 2003 EuroBasket; (gold) 2006 FIBA World Cup; (silver) 2007 EuroBasket; (silver) 2008 Summer Olympics; (gold) 2009 EuroBasket; (gold) 2011 EuroBasket; (silver) 2012 Summer Olympics; (gold) 2015 EuroBasket; (bronze) 2016 Summer Olympics
Juan Carlos Navarro	10	Extended content: (bronze) 2001 EuroBasket; (silver) 2003 EuroBasket; (gold) 2006 FIBA World Cup; (silver) 2007 EuroBasket; (silver) 2008 Summer Olympics; (gold) 2009 EuroBasket; (gold) 2011 EuroBasket; (silver) 2012 Summer Olympics; (bronze) 2016 Summer Olympics; (bronze) 2017 EuroBasket
Marc Gasol	9	Extended content: (gold) 2006 FIBA World Cup; (silver) 2007 EuroBasket; (silver) 2008 Summer Olympics; (gold) 2009 EuroBasket; (gold) 2011 EuroBasket; (silver) 2012 Summer Olympics; (bronze) 2013 EuroBasket; (bronze) 2017 EuroBasket; (gold) 2019 FIBA World Cup
José Manuel Calderón	8	Extended content: (silver) 2003 EuroBasket; (gold) 2006 FIBA World Cup; (silver) 2007 EuroBasket; (silver) 2008 Summer Olympics; (gold) 2011 EuroBasket; (silver) 2012 Summer Olympics; (bronze) 2013 EuroBasket; (bronze) 2016 Summer Olympics

==== Overall players records ====
- Most games played: Rudy Fernández – 266 games played
- Most points scored: Pau Gasol – 3,656 points scored
- Most points scored in a single game: Jordi Villacampa – 48 points scored against Venezuela at the 1990 FIBA World Cup.
- Played in most Summer Olympic Games:
  - 6 - Rudy Fernández (2004, 2008, 2012, 2016, 2020 and 2024)
  - 5 – Juan Carlos Navarro (2000, 2004, 2008, 2012 and 2016) and Pau Gasol (2004, 2008, 2012, 2016 and 2020)
  - 4 – Epi (1980, 1984, 1988 and 1992), Felipe Reyes and José Manuel Calderón (2004, 2008, 2012 and 2016)
- Longest tenure in the national team: Pau Gasol (20 years), Rudy Fernández (20 years) and Juan Carlos Navarro (18 years).

=== International competitions ===
- **FIBA World Cup MVP**
  - Pau Gasol – 2006
  - Ricky Rubio – 2019
- **FIBA World Cup All-Tournament Team**
  - Álvaro Salvadores – 1950
  - Wayne Brabender – 1974
  - Juan Antonio San Epifanio – 1982
  - Alberto Herreros – 1998
  - Jorge Garbajosa – 2006
  - Pau Gasol – 2006, 2014
  - Ricky Rubio – 2019
  - Marc Gasol – 2019
- **EuroBasket MVP**
  - Rafael Martín – 1935
  - Emiliano Rodríguez – 1963
  - Wayne Brabender – 1973
  - Juan Antonio Corbalán – 1983
  - Pau Gasol – 2009, 2015
  - Juan Carlos Navarro – 2011
  - Willy Hernangómez – 2022
- **EuroBasket All-Tournament Team**
  - Clifford Luyk – 1969
  - Francisco Buscató – 1973
  - Wayne Brabender – 1973, 1975
  - Juan Antonio Corbalán – 1983
  - Juan Antonio San Epifanio – 1983
  - Fernando Martín Espina – 1985
  - Andrés Jiménez – 1987
  - Antonio Martín Espina – 1991
  - Jordi Villacampa – 1993
  - Alberto Herreros – 1999
  - Pau Gasol – 2001, 2003, 2007, 2009, 2011, 2015, 2017
  - Juan Carlos Navarro – 2005, 2011
  - José Calderón – 2007
  - Rudy Fernández – 2007
  - Marc Gasol – 2013
  - Sergio Rodríguez – 2015
  - Lorenzo Brown – 2022
  - Willy Hernangómez – 2022
- **EuroBasket Top Scorer**
  - Alberto Herreros – 1999
  - Pau Gasol – 2003, 2009, 2015

=== Other notable achievements ===
- **FIBA Hall of Fame**
  - Emiliano Rodríguez
  - Fernando Martín Espina
  - Juan Antonio San Epifanio
  - Pau Gasol
- **Mr. Europa**
  - Juan Antonio San Epifanio – 1984
  - Pau Gasol – 2004, 2009
  - Jorge Garbajosa – 2006
  - Ricky Rubio – 2008
  - Juan Carlos Navarro – 2010
- **Euroscar**
  - Pau Gasol – 2008, 2009, 2010, 2015
  - Marc Gasol – 2014
- **FIBA Europe Men's Player of the Year Award**
  - Pau Gasol – 2008, 2009
- **All-NBA First Team**
  - Marc Gasol – 2015
- **NBA All-Stars**
  - Pau Gasol – 2006, 2009, 2010, 2011, 2015, 2016
  - Marc Gasol – 2012, 2015, 2017
- **NBA champion**
  - Pau Gasol – 2009, 2010
  - Marc Gasol – 2019
  - Serge Ibaka – 2019
- **NBA All-Rookie First Team**
  - Pau Gasol – 2002
  - Ricky Rubio – 2012
  - Nikola Mirotić – 2015
  - Willy Hernangómez – 2017
- **NBA Rookie of the Year**
  - Pau Gasol – 2002
- **EuroLeague MVP**
  - Juan Carlos Navarro – 2009
  - Sergio Rodríguez – 2014
  - Sergio Llull – 2017
- **EuroLeague Final Four MVP**
  - Juan Carlos Navarro – 2010
- **50 Greatest EuroLeague Contributors (2008)**
  - Rafael Rullán
  - Ignacio Solozábal
  - Fernando Martín Espina
  - Jordi Villacampa
  - Juan Carlos Navarro

=== Head coaches ===
Years	Name	Competition
1935	(Spain) (Argentina) Mariano Manent	(silver) 1935 EuroBasket
1943	(Spain) Santiago Monerris	
1947–1950	(Spain) Anselmo López	
1950–1951	(Lithuania) (United States) Mykolas Ruzgys	9th 1950 World Cup
1951	(Spain) Fernando Font	
1952	(Puerto Rico) (Spain) Freddy Borrás	
1953–1958	(Spain) Jacinto Ardevínez	
1959–1960	(Spain) Eduardo Kucharski	15th 1959 EuroBasket; 14th 1960 Summer Olympics
1961	(Spain) Fernando Font	13th 1961 EuroBasket
1962–1964	(Spain) Joaquín Hernández	7th 1963 EuroBasket
1965	(Spain) Pedro Ferrándiz	11th 1965 EuroBasket
1965–1992	(Spain) Antonio Díaz-Miguel	10th 1967 EuroBasket; 7th 1968 Summer Olympics; 5th 1969 EuroBasket; 7th 1971 EuroBasket; 11th 1972 Summer Olympics; (silver) 1973 EuroBasket; 5th 1974 World Cup; 4th 1975 EuroBasket; 9th 1977 EuroBasket; 6th 1979 EuroBasket; 4th 1980 Summer Olympics; 4th 1981 EuroBasket; 4th 1982 World Cup; (silver) 1983 EuroBasket; (silver) 1984 Summer Olympics; 4th 1985 EuroBasket; 5th 1986 World Cup; 4th 1987 EuroBasket; 8th 1988 Summer Olympics; 5th 1989 Eurobasket; 10th 1990 World Cup; (bronze) 1991 EuroBasket; 9th 1992 Summer Olympics
1993–2000	(Spain) Lolo Sainz	5th 1993 EuroBasket; 10th 1994 World Cup; 6th 1995 EuroBasket; 5th 1997 EuroBasket; 5th 1998 World Cup; (silver) 1999 EuroBasket; 9th 2000 Summer Olympics
2001–2002	(Spain) Javier Imbroda	(bronze) 2001 EuroBasket; 5th 2002 World Cup
2003	(Spain) Moncho López	(silver) 2003 EuroBasket
2004–2005	(Spain) Mario Pesquera	7th 2004 Summer Olympics; 4th 2005 EuroBasket
2006–2007	(Spain) Pepu Hernández	(gold) 2006 World Cup; (silver) 2007 EuroBasket
2008	(Spain) Aíto García Reneses	(silver) 2008 Summer Olympics
2009–2012	(Italy) Sergio Scariolo	(gold) 2009 EuroBasket; 6th 2010 World Cup; (gold) 2011 EuroBasket; (silver) 2012 Summer Olympics
2013–2014	(Spain) Juan Antonio Orenga	(bronze) 2013 EuroBasket; 5th 2014 World Cup
2015–2025	(Italy) Sergio Scariolo	(gold) 2015 EuroBasket; (bronze) 2016 Summer Olympics; (bronze) 2017 EuroBasket; (gold) 2019 World Cup; 6th 2020 Summer Olympics; (gold) 2022 EuroBasket; 9th 2023 World Cup; 10th 2024 Summer Olympics; 17th 2025 EuroBasket

- Most games as head coach: Antonio Díaz-Miguel: 423 games, over 27 years.
- Most medals won with the national team: (8): Sergio Scariolo

== Progression in the FIBA World Ranking ==
Date	Change	Pos.	Points	Dis.
28 March 2025	▲1	5th	745.7	-94.4
29 November 2024	Steady	6th	746.6	-92.4
15 August 2024	▼4	6th	746.7	-92.1
1 March 2024	▼1	2nd	773.9	-10.9
18 November 2022	▲1	1st	758.6	+1.1
26 September 2022	Steady	2nd	758.9	−1.8
1 March 2022	Steady	2nd	724.0	−39.4
7 December 2021	Steady	2nd	724.1	−39.2
9 August 2021	Steady	2nd	721.4	−42.8
2 March 2021	Steady	2nd	721.3	−60.5
3 March 2020	Steady	2nd	722.9	−58.7
19 September 2019	Steady	2nd	731.5	−54.9
26 February 2019	Steady	2nd	703.4	−90.3
4 December 2018	Steady	2nd	702.6	−80.4
18 September 2018	Steady	2nd	704.2	−62.9
3 July 2018	Steady	2nd	706.7	−41.4
28 February 2018	Steady	2nd	704.7	−30.3
28 November 2017	Steady	2nd	693.8	−142.4
11 October 2017	Steady	2nd	693.2	−126.4

== See also ==
- Spanish Basketball Federation
- Spain women's national basketball team
- Spain national youth basketball teams
- Sport in Spain
