= EuroBasket 1973 =

International basketball event

XVIII Campeonato Europeo de Baloncesto

Tournament details
- Host country: Spain
- Cities: Barcelona and Badalona
- Dates: 27 September – 6 October
- Teams: 12
- Venues: 2 (in 2 host cities)

Final positions
- Champions: Yugoslavia (1st title)
- Runners-up: Spain
- Third place: Soviet Union
- Fourth place: Czechoslovakia

Tournament statistics
- MVP: (Spain) Wayne Brabender
- Top scorer: (Bulgaria) Atanas Golomeev (22.3 points per game)

The 1973 FIBA European Championship, commonly called FIBA EuroBasket 1973, was the eighteenth FIBA EuroBasket regional basketball championship, held by FIBA Europe.

== Venues ==
| Barcelona | Badalona |
|---|---|
| Palacio de los Deportes; Capacity 8 000 | Pabellón de Ausias March; Capacity 5 000 |

== Group stage ==
=== Group A – Badalona ===
| Poland | Soviet Union | 83–104 |
| Czechoslovakia | Israel | 92–89 |
| Turkey | Romania | 69–84 |
| Czechoslovakia | Soviet Union | 55–77 |
| Israel | Romania | 85–80 |
| Poland | Turkey | 64–65 |
| Soviet Union | Turkey | 79–53 |
| Czechoslovakia | Romania | 70–61 |
| Israel | Poland | 98–84 |
| Czechoslovakia | Turkey | 66–64 |
| Soviet Union | Israel | 101–78 |
| Romania | Poland | 60–66 |
| Romania | Soviet Union | 84–98 |
| Czechoslovakia | Poland | 81–79 |
| Turkey | Israel | 94–93 |

| Pos. | Team | Matches | Wins | Losses | Results | Points | Diff. |
|---|---|---|---|---|---|---|---|
| 1. | Soviet Union | 5 | 5 | 0 | 459:353 | 10 | +106 |
| 2. | Czechoslovakia | 5 | 4 | 1 | 364:370 | 8 | −6 |
| 3. | Turkey | 5 | 2 | 3 | 345:386 | 4 | −41 |
| 4. | Israel | 5 | 2 | 3 | 443:451 | 4 | −8 |
| 5. | Poland | 5 | 1 | 4 | 376:408 | 2 | −32 |
| 6. | Romania | 5 | 1 | 4 | 369:388 | 2 | −19 |

=== Group B – Barcelona ===
| Bulgaria | France | 89–70 |
| Spain | Yugoslavia | 59–65 |
| Greece | Italy | 54–59 |
| Greece | Yugoslavia | 68–84 |
| Spain | Bulgaria | 85–69 |
| Italy | France | 71–63 |
| Greece | France | 67–62 |
| Yugoslavia | Bulgaria | 76–65 |
| Italy | Spain | 65–77 |
| Greece | Bulgaria | 72–86 |
| France | Spain | 80–85 |
| Yugoslavia | Italy | 73–71 |
| Bulgaria | Italy | 58–69 |
| Greece | Spain | 74–86 |
| France | Yugoslavia | 70–80 |

| Pos. | Team | Matches | Wins | Losses | Results | Points | Diff. |
|---|---|---|---|---|---|---|---|
| 1. | Yugoslavia | 5 | 5 | 0 | 378:333 | 10 | +45 |
| 2. | Spain | 5 | 4 | 1 | 392:353 | 8 | +29 |
| 3. | Italy | 5 | 3 | 2 | 335:325 | 6 | +10 |
| 4. | Bulgaria | 5 | 2 | 3 | 367:372 | 4 | −5 |
| 5. | Greece | 5 | 1 | 4 | 335:377 | 2 | −42 |
| 6. | France | 5 | 0 | 5 | 345:392 | 0 | −47 |

== Knockout stage ==
Semi-finals
Soviet Union | 76
Spain | 80
Yugoslavia | 96
Czechoslovakia | 71

Final
Spain | 67
Yugoslavia | 78
Third place
Soviet Union | 90
Czechoslovakia | 58

=== 5th to 8th place ===
Classification round
Turkey | 67
Bulgaria | 76
Italy | 94
Israel | 73

Fifth place
Bulgaria | 71
Italy | 80
Seventh place
Turkey | 78
Israel | 96

=== 9th to 12th place ===
Classification round
Poland | 62
France | 67
Greece | 78
Romania | 89

Ninth place
France | 69
Romania | 72
Eleventh place
Poland | 64
Greece | 65

1973 FIBA EuroBasket champions

Yugoslavia
1st title

== Final standings ==
1. Yugoslavia
2. Spain
3. Soviet Union
4. Czechoslovakia
5. Italy
6. Bulgaria
7. Israel
8. Turkey
9. Romania
10. France
11. Greece
12. Poland

== Awards ==
1973 FIBA EuroBasket Championship MVP: Wayne Brabender ( Spain)

All-Tournament Team
(Soviet Union) Sergei Belov
(Spain) Francisco "Nino" Buscato
(Spain) Wayne Brabender (MVP)
(Socialist Federal Republic of Yugoslavia) Krešimir Ćosić
(Bulgaria) Atanas Golomeev

== Team rosters ==
1. Yugoslavia: Krešimir Ćosić, Dražen Dalipagić, Dragan Kićanović, Zoran Slavnić, Nikola Plećaš, Željko Jerkov, Vinko Jelovac, Damir Šolman, Rato Tvrdić, Milun Marović, Žarko Knežević, Dragi Ivković (Coach: Mirko Novosel)

2. Spain: Clifford Luyk, Wayne Brabender, Francisco "Nino" Buscato, Vicente Ramos, Rafael Rullan, Manuel Flores, Luis Miguel Santillana, Carmelo Cabrera, Gonzalo Sagi-Vela, Jose Luis Sagi-Vela, Miguel Angel Estrada, Enrique Margall (Coach: Antonio Díaz-Miguel)

3. Soviet Union: Sergei Belov, Modestas Paulauskas, Anatoly Myshkin, Ivan Edeshko, Zurab Sakandelidze, Sergei Kovalenko, Valeri Miloserdov, Evgeni Kovalenko, Aleksander Boloshev, Yuri Pavlov, Jaak Salumets, Nikolai Djachenko (Coach: Vladimir Kondrashin)

4. Czechoslovakia: Jiří Zídek Sr., Kamil Brabenec, Zdenek Kos, Jiří Zedníček, Jan Bobrovsky, Jiri Pospisil, Petr Novicky, Jan Blažek, Josef Klima, Vojtech Petr, Jiri Balastik, Gustav Hraska (Coach: Vladimir Heger)
