= Arcega =

Arcega is a surname of Spanish origin. It may refer to:

- Fernando Arcega, Spanish basketball player, brother of José
- J. J. Arcega-Whiteside, Spanish-American gridiron football player
- José Arcega, Spanish basketball player, brother of Fernando
- José Isidro Moreno Árcega, Mexican politician
- Michael Arcega, Filipino-American sculptor and artist
