= Basketball at the 1963 Mediterranean Games =

The basketball tournament at the 1963 Mediterranean Games was held in Naples, Italy.

== Medalists ==
Event	Gold	Silver	Bronze
Men's tournament	Italy (ITA)	Spain (ESP)	Yugoslavia (YUG)

=== Standings ===
Rank	Team
1st place, gold medalist(s)	Italy Ettore Zuccheri, Corrado Pellanera, Gianfranco Lombardi, Massimo Masini, Claudio Velluti, Paolo Vittori, Franco Bertini, Guido Carlo Gatti, Alfredo Barlucchi, Sauro Bufalini, Santo Rossi, Massimo Cosmelli. Coach: Nello Paratore
2nd place, silver medalist(s)	Spain Artur Auladell, Francesc Buscató, Jesús Codina, Miguel González Lázaro, José Lluis, Alfonso Martínez, Juan Antonio Martínez Arroyo, Moncho Monsalve, José Ramón Ramos, Emiliano Rodríguez, Lolo Sainz, Carlos Sevillano. Coach: Joaquín Hernández
3rd place, bronze medalist(s)	Yugoslavia Eduard Bočkaj, Dragutin Čermak, Vladimir Cvetković, Boris Križan, Boris Lalić, Bruno Marcelić, Z. Marković, Zvonko Petričević, Ivan Potočnik, Radovan Radović, Željko Troskot, Ratomir Vićentić. Coach: Aleksandar Nikolić
4	United Arab Republic
5	Turkey Mehmet Baturalp, Şengün Kaplanoğlu, Nedret Uyguç, Ünal Büyükaycan, Özer Salnur, Tuncer Kobaner, Haşim Ülkü Yakın, Hüseyin Kozluca, Yavuz Demir, Nedim Hoşgör, İlker Esel, Erdal Poyrazoğlu, Halil Dağlı. Coach: Yalçın Granit
6	Lebanon
7	Syria
8	Morocco
