= Basketball at the 1959 Mediterranean Games =

The basketball tournament at the 1959 Mediterranean Games was held in Beirut, Lebanon.

== Medalists ==
| Event | Gold | Silver | Bronze |
|---|---|---|---|
| Men | Yugoslavia | Spain | United Arab Republic |

=== Standings ===
| Rank | Team |
|---|---|
| 1st place, gold medalist(s) | Yugoslavia Miodrag Nikolić, Marjan Kandus, Branko Radović, Slobodan Gordić, Željko Troskot, Bogdan Müller, Milutin Minja, Ivo Daneu, Nemanja Đurić, Sreten Dragojlović, Radovan Radović. Coach: Aza Nikolić. |
| 2nd place, silver medalist(s) | Spain Artur Auladell, Francesc Buscató, Francisco Capel, Antonio Díaz-Miguel, Pepe Laso, José Lluis, Alfonso Martínez, Juan Martos, Santiago Navarro, Jordi Parra, Emiliano Rodríguez, Carlos Sevillano. Coach: Eduardo Kucharski |
| 3rd place, bronze medalist(s) | United Arab Republic |
| 4 | Lebanon |
| 5 | Turkey Mehmet Baturalp, Şengün Kaplanoğlu, Nedret Uyguç, Ünal Büyükaycan, Özer Salnur, Tuncer Kobaner, Üner Erimer, Erdoğan Karabelen, Tuğrul Demir, Altan Dinçer, Güner Yalçıner. Coach: Samim Göreç |
| 6 | Tunisia |
