= Dragojlović =

Dragojlović (Serbian Cyrillic: Драгојловић) is a Serbian surname, a patronymic derived from the Slavic masculine given name Dragojlo. It may refer to:

- Vladislav Dragojlović (b. 1979), Serbian basketball player
- Sreten Dragojlović, former Yugoslav basketball player
- Nebojša Dragojlović, Serbian drummer in Kazna Za Uši
- Dragoljub Dragojlović, historian
- Mladen Dragojlović, Civil Engineer

== See also ==
- Dragojlić, surname
