= Miguel González (basketball) =

Spanish basketball player (1938–2022)

Personal information
- Born: 24 September 1938 Valencia, Spain
- Died: 4 July 2022 (aged 83)
- Listed height: 1.89 m (6 ft 2 in)

Career information
- Playing career: 1960–1974

Career history
- 1960–62: Aismalíbar
- 1962–63: Picadero JC
- 1963–64: Barcelona
- 1964–66: Real Madrid
- 1966–67: Barcelona
- 1967–68: Joventut Badalona
- 1968–70: Mataró
- 1970–73: Manresa
- 1973–74: Espanyol
Medals
Men's basketball
Representing the Spain
Mediterranean Games
Silver medal – second place	1963	{{{2}}}

Miguel Ángel González Lázaro (24 September 1938 – 4 July 2022) was a Spanish basketball player who competed in the men's tournament at the 1960 Summer Olympics and won a silver medal at the men's tournament of the 1963 Mediterranean Games. During his career, he played for the basketball teams of FC Barcelona and Real Madrid.

== Career ==
Born in Valencia on 24 September 1938, González began his basketball career in his hometown team Unión Naval de Levante, from which he joined Dimar, also based in Valencia. He was a member of the Spanish national team that competed in the men's tournament of the 1960 Summer Olympics in Rome, after which he joined Aismalíbar, coached by Eduardo Kucharski. His appearance at the Olympics allowed him to become the first-ever Valencian to represent the Spanish national team.

After a short stint at Picadero JC (1962–63), González won a silver medal at the men's tournament of the 1963 Mediterranean Games in Naples and participated in two EuroBasket tournaments in 1963 and 1965. In total, he played 70 matches for the Spanish national team. (Note: Some sources wrongly claim that he made 68 appearances.)

González then played for the basketball teams of both FC Barcelona and Real Madrid between 1963 and 1967. During his first season in Madrid, he helped his side win the treble (European Cup, Spanish League, and Spanish Cup), scoring seven points in the second leg of the final of the 1965 European Cup against CSKA Moscow in Madrid, as well as 20 points in the Copa del Rey final against Náutico Tenerife. During his second season, he won a further two titles, this time the domestic double.

González then played for several lower teams, such as Joventut Badalona (1967–68), Mataró (1968–70), Manresa (1970–73), and Espanyol (1973–74), which he combined with his professional activity as a tourism technician.

== Later life and death ==
González was one of the bearers of the Olympic torch during the opening ceremony of the 1992 Olympic Games in Barcelona. He died on 4 July 2022, at the age of 83.

== Honours ==
=== Club ===
Real Madrid

- Liga Española de Baloncesto
  - Champions (2): 1965 and 1966
- Copa del Rey de Baloncesto:
  - Champion (2): 1965 and 1966
- European Cup
  - Champion (1): 1965

=== International ===
Spain

- Mediterranean Games
  - Runner-up: 1963
