= Dragojlo =

Dragojlo (Serbian Cyrillic: Драгојло) is a Serbian masculine given name, derived from the Slavic word drag- ("dear, beloved"). It may refer to:

- Dragojlo Stanojlović, Serbian footballer
- Bajo Pivljanin, born Dragojlo, hajduk
- Dragojlo Dudić (born 1887), Serbian Yugoslav Partisan

== See also ==
- Dragojlović, patronymic
- Dragojloviće
