= Antonio Díaz-Miguel =

Spanish basketball player and coach

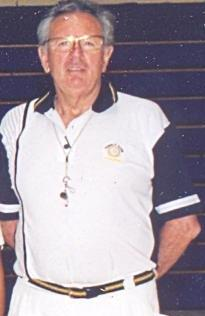
- Antonio Díaz-Miguel

Personal information
- Born: July 6, 1933 Alcázar de San Juan, Ciudad Real, Spain
- Died: February 21, 2000 (aged 66) Madrid, Spain
- Listed height: 6 ft 1.25 in (1.86 m)

Career information
- College: University of Bilbao
- Playing career: 1950–1963
- Position: Power forward / center
- Coaching career: 1963–1997

Career history

Playing
- 1950–1952: Estudiantes Madrid
- 1952–1953: Transportes Cave
- 1953–1958: Estudiantes Madrid
- 1958–1961: Real Madrid
- 1961–1966: Águilas Bilbao

Coaching
- 1963–1965: Club Águilas Bilbao
- 1965–1992: Spain
- 1993: Pallacanestro Cantú
- 1996–1997: Pool Getafe

Career highlights
- As player: 2× Spanish League champion (1960, 1961); 2× Spanish Cup winner (1960, 1961); As head coach: 5× FIBA European Selection (1977, 1978, 1981 (2×), 1982); Royal Order of Sports Merit Grand Cross (2000); Royal Order of Sports Merit Gold Medal (1994); 2× AEEB Spanish Coach of the Year (1981, 1983); Spanish Women's League champion (1997); Spanish Women's Cup winner (1997)
- Basketball Hall of Fame
- FIBA Hall of Fame
Medals
Men's basketball
Head coach for Spain
Olympic Games
Silver medal – second place	1984 Los Angeles
EuroBasket
Silver medal – second place	1973 Spain
Silver medal – second place	1983 France
Bronze medal – third place	1991 Italy

Antonio Díaz-Miguel Sanz (July 6, 1933 – February 21, 2000) was a Spanish professional basketball player and coach. He studied in Madrid, and graduated from the University of Bilbao.

A pioneer in the worldwide promotion of basketball, he won several coaching awards, and was a frequent basketball lecturer around the world. He was enshrined into the Basketball Hall of Fame, as a coach, on September 29, 1997. In 2007, he was enshrined into the FIBA Hall of Fame.

== Basketball playing career ==
=== Club career ===
Although initially a football player in his youth, Díaz-Miguel's physical characteristics, including a 1.86 m (6'1 1 1/4") barefoot height, and also his determination, contributed to his start in basketball, as a player, at the Instituto Ramiro de Maeztu Secondary School of Madrid, where the Estudiantes ("students") club was founded in 1950, with pupils and teachers of the school. He was a player of Estudiantes Club of Madrid in 1950–52, and 1953–1958, and later also played with Real Madrid (1958–1961), and Águilas Bilbao (1961–1963). He won the top-tier level Spanish Clubs League championship twice, in 1960 and 1961, with Real Madrid.

=== Spain national team ===
Díaz-Miguel had 27 caps as a player of the senior Spain national basketball team. He won a gold medal at the 1955 Mediterranean Games. He also won a silver medal at the 1959 Mediterranean Games.

== Basketball coaching career ==
Immediately after his retirement from his basketball playing career, Díaz-Miguel started coaching Águilas Bilbao. Following that, he later provisionally, and nearly by chance, became the head coach of the senior Spain National Team, where he managed to develop longstanding success for the team, and the sport of basketball in Spain. He was the head coach of the senior Spain national basketball team, for as long as 27 years (1965–1992).

In 431 games coached, Díaz-Miguel guided the Spain National Team to six Summer Olympic Games tournaments, including a silver medal at the 1984 Summer Olympic Games, in Los Angeles. That was the top classification for the Spain National Team until the 2008 Summer Olympics, when they finished second again. Díaz-Miguel's Spain National teams also participated in 13 EuroBaskets and four FIBA World Cups, and his team's best finishes were two silver medals (EuroBasket 1973, EuroBasket 1983), and one bronze medal (EuroBasket 1991) in the EuroBasket. He also won a silver medal at the 1987 Mediterranean Games.

He was named "Spanish Coach of the Year", in 1981 and 1983. Díaz-Miguel was selected as a coach of the FIBA European Selection teams five times.
