= José Lluis =

Spanish basketball coach

Josep Lluís i Cortés
Personal information
- Born: 13 December 1937; Badalona, Spain
- Died: 4 October 2018 (aged 80); Badalona, Spain
- Position: Point guard

Josep Lluís i Cortés (13 December 1937 – 4 October 2018) was a Spanish basketball player and coach. He competed for Spain in the men's tournament at the 1960 Summer Olympics.

== Honours ==
Real Madrid Baloncesto

- Liga Española (3): 1959–60, 1960–61, 1961–62
- Copa del Rey de Baloncesto (3): 1960, 1961, 1962

Club Joventut Badalona

- Liga Española: 1966–67
- Copa del Rey de Baloncesto: 1969

Spain

- Mediterranean Games runner-up: 1959, 1963
