= Vicente Ramos (basketball) =

Spanish basketball player (born 1947)

Personal information
- Born: 18 March 1947 (age 79) Ciudad Rodrigo, Salamanca, Spain
- Listed height: 5 ft 11 in (1.80 m)
- Listed weight: 175 lb (79 kg)

Career information
- Playing career: 1963–1978
- Position: Point guard

Career history
- 1963–1968: Estudiantes
- 1968–1978: Real Madrid

Career highlights
- As a player: 3× FIBA Intercontinental Cup champion (1976–1978); 2× EuroLeague champion (1974, 1978); FIBA European Selection (1970); 9× Spanish League champion (1969–1977); 7× Spanish Cup winner (1970–1975 1977)
Medals
Representing Spain
Men's basketball
EuroBasket
Silver medal – second place	1973 Spain

Vicente Ramos Cecilio (born 18 March 1947) is a Spanish retired professional basketball player. At a height of 1.80 m (5 ft 11 in) tall, and a weight of 79 kg (174 lb), he played at the point guard position.

== Club career ==
Ramos was a FIBA European Selection, in 1970.

== Spain national team ==
With the senior Spain men's national basketball team, Ramos played at the 1968 Summer Olympics, and at the 1972 Summer Olympics. He won a silver medal at EuroBasket 1973.

== Awards and accomplishments ==
- 9× Spanish League Champion: (1969, 1970, 1971, 1972, 1973, 1974, 1975, 1976, 1977)
- 7× Spanish Cup Winner: (1970, 1971, 1972, 1973, 1974, 1975, 1977)
- 2× EuroLeague Champion: (1974, 1978)
- 3× FIBA Intercontinental Cup Champion: (1976, 1977, 1978)

== Personal ==
Ramos is the uncle of tennis player Fernando Verdasco.
