= Sreten Dragojlović =

Serbian basketball player and coach

Personal information
- Born: 6 May 1938 Kraljevo, Morava Banovina, Kingdom of Yugoslavia
- Died: 2 September 1971 (aged 33) Gornji Milanovac, SR Serbia, SFR Yugoslavia
- Listed height: 1.91 m (6 ft 3 in)
- Listed weight: 91 kg (201 lb)

Career information
- NBA draft: 1960: undrafted
- Playing career: 1955–1967
- Position: Shooting guard
- Number: 12
- Coaching career: 1967–1971

Career history

Playing
- 1955–1957: Sloga Kraljevo
- 1957–1967: Crvena zvezda

Coaching
- 1967–1971: Crvena zvezda Women
Medals
Men's basketball
Representing Yugoslavia
EuroBasket
Silver medal – second place	1961 Yugoslavia	Team
Mediterranean Games
Gold medal – first place	1959 Lebanon	Team
Balkan Basketball Championship
Gold medal – first place	1963 Greece	Team
Silver medal – second place	1959 Romania	Team
Silver medal – second place	1960 Bulgaria	Team

Sreten Dragojlović (Serbian Cyrillic: Сретен Драгојловић; May 6, 1938 – September 2, 1971) was a Serbian basketball player and coach. He represented the Yugoslavia national basketball team internationally.

== Playing career ==
Dragojlović started his basketball career with his hometown team Sloga. After that, he came to Belgrade and spent most of his career in the Crvena zvezda of the Yugoslav Basketball League for which he played from 1957 to 1967. He was also brought there by the former Zvezda player Srđan Kalember. In 1960, he got five-month suspension after had got caught smuggling on the Poland tour. In the 1963 season, Dragojlović scored an excellent average of 28.2 points per game. He was the best club pointer that season while Vladimir Cvetković scored 25.5 points, and Ratomir Vićentić 18.9. Still, he did not manage to win a trophy with Zvezda. During 10 years with the Crvena zvezda, he played 155 matches and scored 2,437 points. The last match he played on July 23, 1967, against Borac.

== National team career ==
As a player for the Yugoslavia national basketball team Dragojlović participated at the 1960 Summer Olympics in Rome and at the EuroBasket 1961 in Belgrade where he won a silver medal. Also, he won a gold medal at 1959 Mediterranean Games in Lebanon. He played 49 games for the national team from 1959 to 1961.

== Post-playing career ==
Dragojlović coached the Crvena zvezda women's team of the Yugoslav Women's Basketball League. He also worked at the Basketball Federation of Yugoslavia.

== Personal life ==
Dragojlović died in a traffic accident near Gornji Milanovac on September 2, 1971, when he was rushing to visit his sick father.

== See also ==
- List of KK Crvena zvezda players with 100 games played
