= Jesús Iradier =

Spanish basketball player

Personal information
- Nationality: Spanish
- Born: 19 July 1949 (age 75)

Sport
- Sport: Basketball

Jesús Iradier (born 19 July 1949) is a Spanish basketball player. He competed in the men's tournament at the 1972 Summer Olympics.
