= Rafael Martín =

Spanish basketball player

Personal information
- Born: 12 September 1914
- Died: 22 April 2010 (aged 95)
- Listed height: 1.85 m (6 ft 1 in)
- Position: Small forward

Career highlights
- Eurobasket MVP (1935)
Medals
Representing Spain
Men's basketball
EuroBasket
Silver medal – second place	1935 Geneva	Spain

Rafael Martín (12 September 1914 – 22 April 2010) was a Spanish basketball player. A 1.85 m tall small forward, he was the EuroBasket 1935 MVP, as he helped lead the Spanish national team to a silver medal.
