= Juanma López Iturriaga =

Spanish basketball player (born 1959)

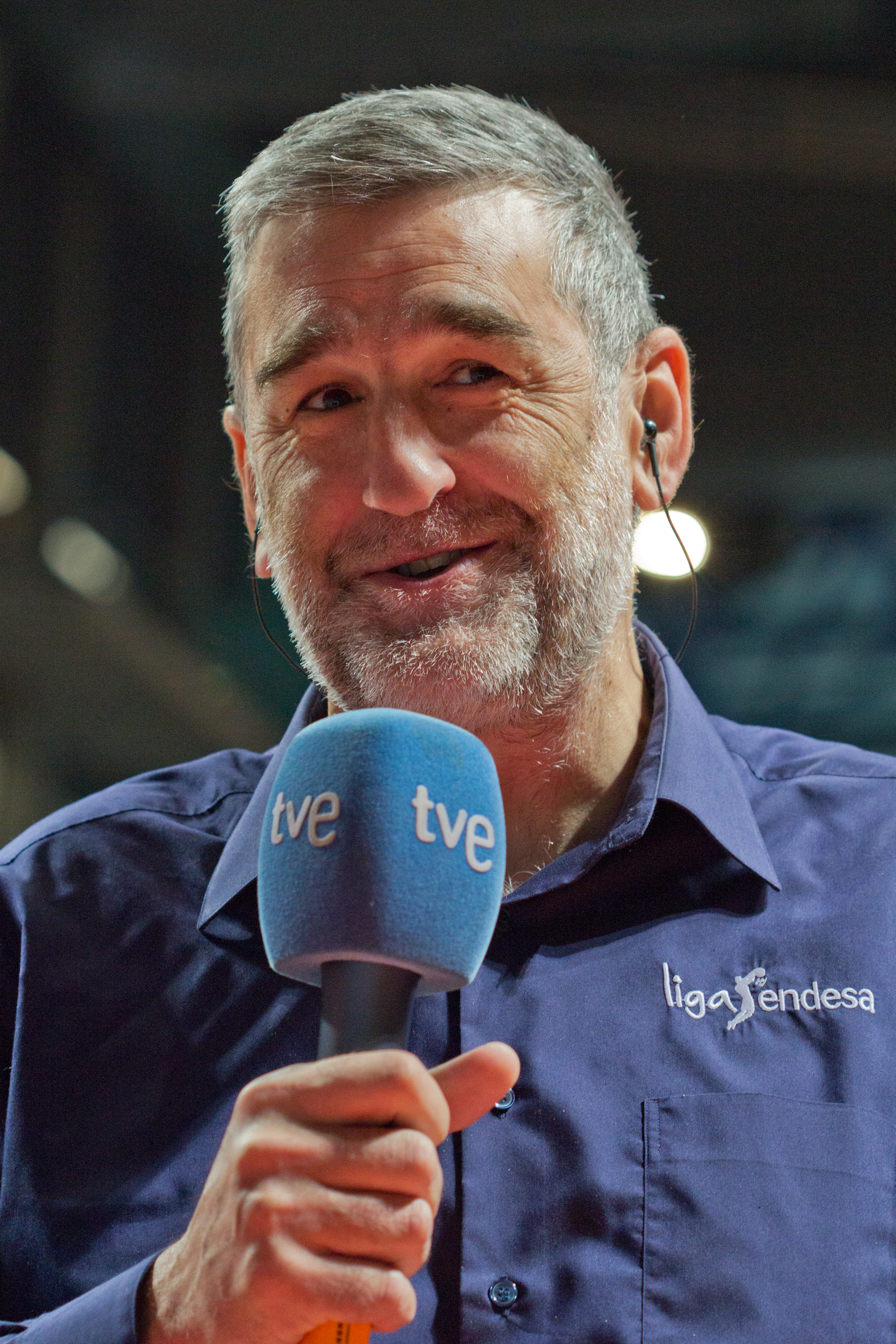
- Juanma López Iturriaga in 2013

Personal information
- Born: February 4, 1959 (age 67) Bilbao, Basque Country, Spain
- Listed height: 6 ft 5 in (1.96 m)
- Position: Shooting guard / small forward

Career history
- 1975–1976: Loyola Indautxu
- 1976–1988: Real Madrid
- 1988–1990: Cajabilbao
Medals
Representing Spain
Men's basketball
Silver medal – second place	1984 Los Angeles	National Team
FIBA EuroBasket
Silver medal – second place	1983 France	National Team
European U-18 Championship
Bronze medal – third place	1976 Spain	U-18 Spain
Bronze medal – third place	1978 Italy	U-18 Spain

Juan Manuel "Juanma" López Iturriaga (born February 4, 1959) is a Spanish retired professional basketball player. He played shooting guard and small forward and appeared in a total of 90 games with the Spain national basketball team, winning a silver medal at the 1984 Olympics in Los Angeles.

== Career ==
In 1975–76, Iturriaga played for Loyola Indautxu in national competition. Then he joined Real Madrid Baloncesto, where he would stay until the year 1987–88.

== Retirement ==
Juan Manuel López Iturriaga has become a sports consultant on Spanish TV channels, commenting on the games of the Spanish team, working in newspapers such as El País and Gigantes del Basket. After his playing career, he began a career as a television host on Telemadrid, ETB 2, Telecinco and La Sexta,
