= Ignacio Solozábal =

Spanish basketball player

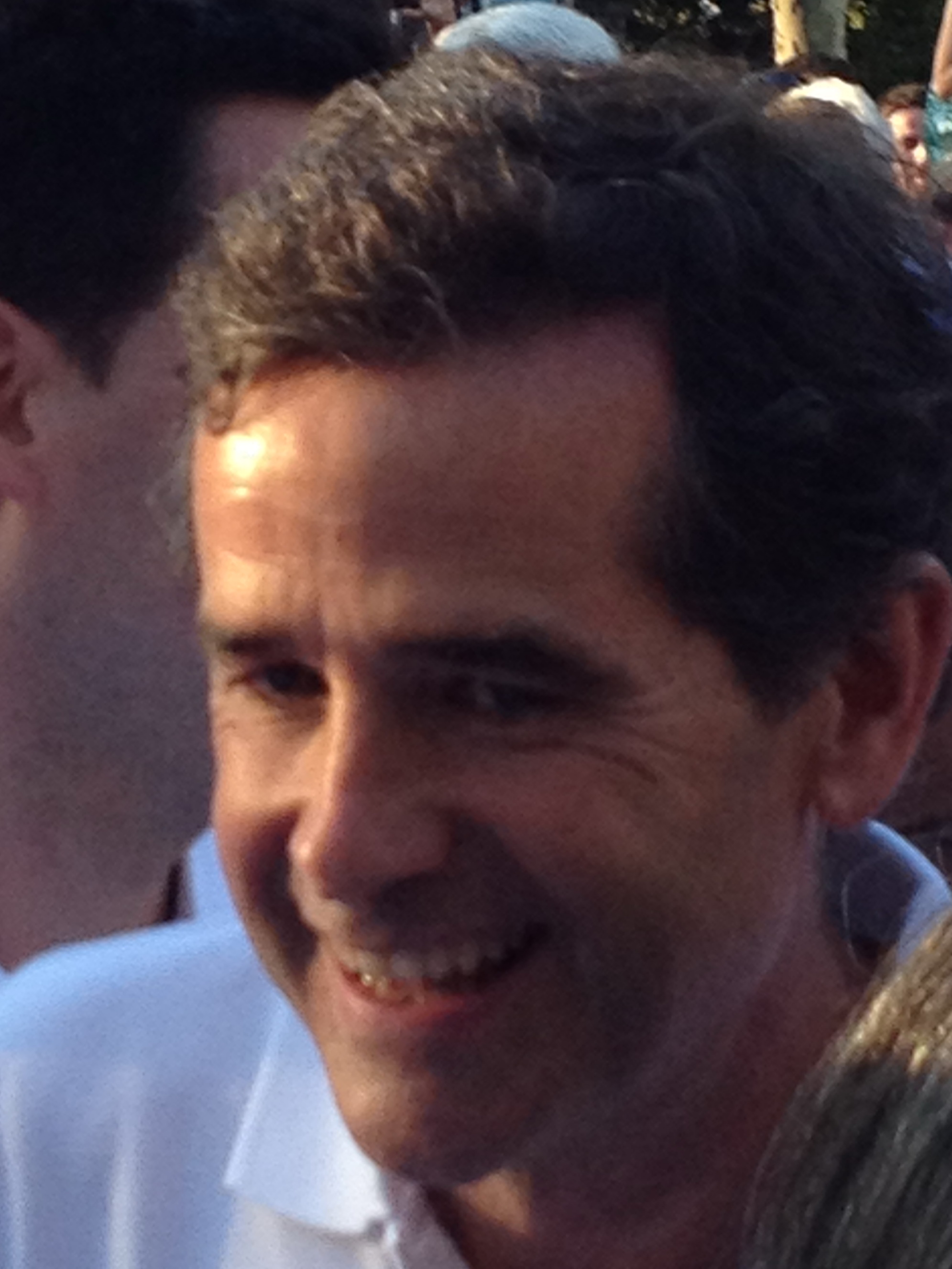
- Solozábal in 2012

Personal information
- Born: 8 January 1958 (age 68) Barcelona, Spain
- Listed height: 185 cm (6 ft 1 in)
- Listed weight: 175 lb (79 kg)

Career information
- Playing career: 1975–1992
- Position: Point guard
- Number: 7

Career history
- 1975–1992: FC Barcelona

Career highlights
- 6× Spanish League champion (1981, 1983, 1987–1990); 9× Spanish Cup winner (1978–1983, 1987, 1988, 1991); 2× Saporta Cup champion (1985, 1986); Korać Cup champion (1987); FIBA Club World Cup champion (1985); No. 7 retired by FC Barcelona
Medals
Men's basketball
Representing Spain
Summer Olympic Games
| Silver medal – second place | 1984 Los Angeles |
EuroBasket
| Silver medal – second place | 1983 France |
European U-18 Championship
| Bronze medal – third place | 1976 Spain | Under-18 Team |

Ignacio Solozábal, most commonly known as Nacho Solozábal (Spanish pronunciation: [iɣˈnaθjo soloˈθaβal]; born 8 January 1958), is a Spanish retired professional basketball player. Born in Barcelona, Spain, and at a height of 1.85 m (6 ft 1 in) tall, played at the point guard position. On 8 October 2006 FC Barcelona retired his number 7 jersey. He is considered to be one of the best Spanish basketball players, and he was among the 105 player nominees for the 50 Greatest EuroLeague Contributors (2008) list.

== Professional career ==
Solozábal spent his entire career with FC Barcelona, from 1979 to 1992. With them he won two Saporta Cups, in 1985 and 1986, a Korać Cup in 1987, six Spanish League championship titles, as well as nine Spanish Cups.

== National team career ==
Solozábal played internationally with the senior Spanish national team, and they won silver medals at the 1983 EuroBasket, and at the 1984 Summer Olympics.
