= Juan Antonio Orenga =

Spanish basketball player and coach

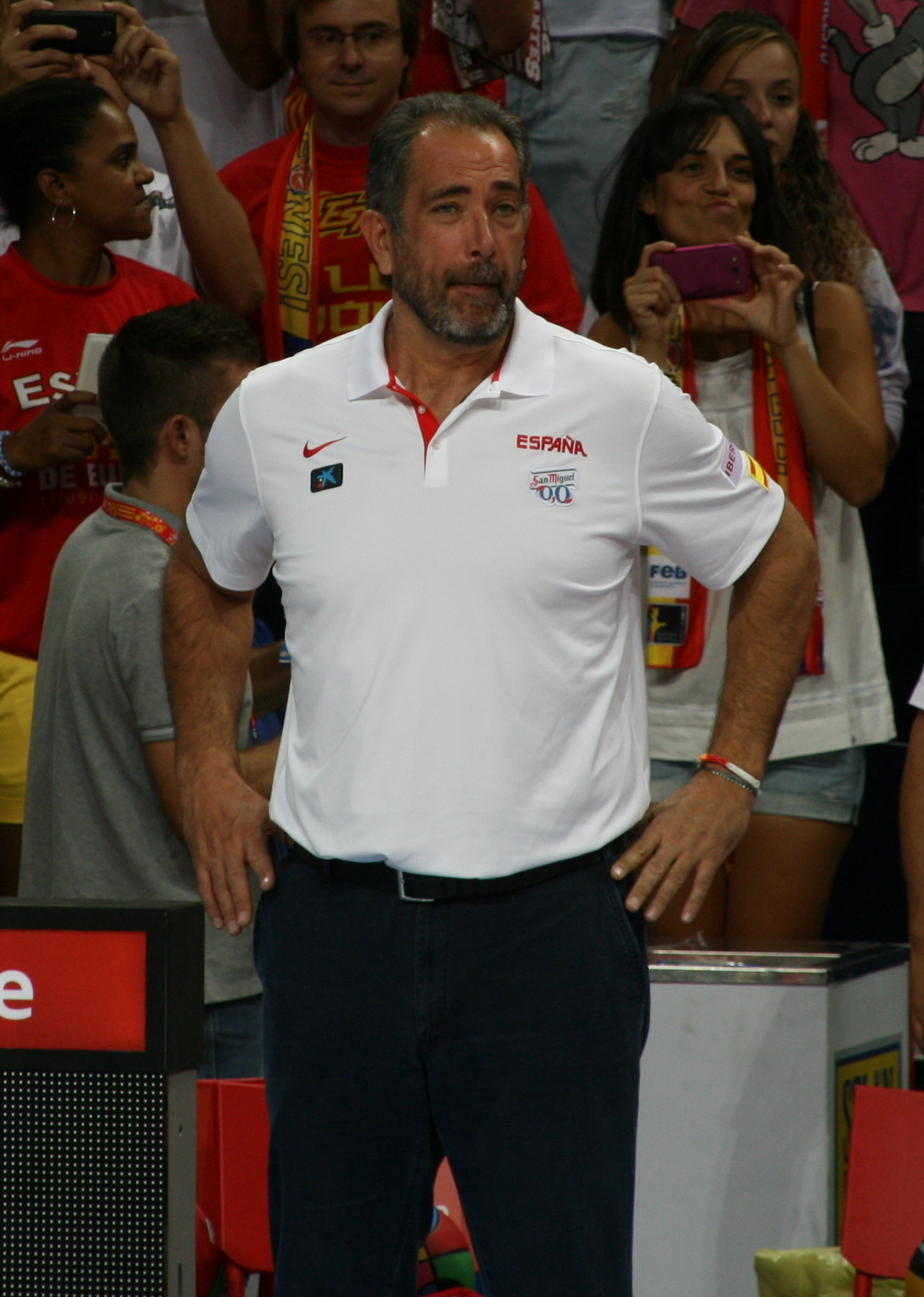
- Juan Antonio Orenga in 2014

Guangzhou Loong Lions
- Title: Head coach

Personal information
- Born: 29 July 1966 (age 60) Castellón de la Plana, Spain
- Listed height: 6 ft 9.5 in (2.07 m)
- Listed weight: 250 lb (113 kg)

Career information
- NBA draft: 1988: undrafted
- Playing career: 1983–2002
- Position: Center
- Coaching career: 2005–present

Career history

Playing
- 1983–1984: Real Madrid
- 1984–1985: Collado Villalba
- 1985–1988: Cajamadrid
- 1988–1996: CB Estudiantes
- 1996–1998: Real Madrid
- 1998–2000: Unicaja
- 2000–2002: Cáceres CB

Coaching
- 2005–2006: CB Estudiantes
- 2009–2010: Spain U20
- 2010–2012: Spain U20
- 2012: Spain U18
- 2012–2014: Spain
- 2016: Spain U20
- 2016–2017: Egypt
- 2017–2018: Jilin Northeast Tigers
- 2018–2021: Guangzhou Loong Lions
- 2021–2022: Xinjiang Flying Tigers (assistant)
- 2022–2024: AB Castelló

Career highlights
- As player: 2× FIBA Saporta Cup champion (1984, 1997); Spanish League champion (1984); Spanish Cup winner (1992); Spanish Cup MVP (1991); Spanish All-Star Game MVP (1997)
Medals
Representing Spain
Men's Basketball
EuroBasket
Bronze medal – third place	1991 Italy
FIBA Europe U16 Championship
Silver medal – second place	1983 West Germany
Representing Spain
Head coach
EuroBasket
Bronze medal – third place	2013 Slovenia

Juan Antonio Orenga Forcada (born 29 July 1966 in Castellón de la Plana) is a retired Spanish professional basketball player, and a current professional basketball coach. He is the current head coach of the Guangzhou Loong Lions of the Chinese Basketball Association (CBA).

== Playing career ==
=== Club career ===
After growing up in San Agustín school in Madrid, Orenga signed for one of the powerhouses of the European basketball as Real Madrid where he won the Spanish League championship in 1984 and the Saporta Cup against Simac Milan. He signed for CB Collado Villalba in the ACB looking for more minutes and a more important role. After only one season signed for Cajamadrid where he played in ACB before get relegated to Primera B (the 2nd division) until 1988.

In the 1988-89 season signed for Estudiantes where he spent 8 seasons playing at his best. In these seasons was named the MVP of the Spanish Cup in 1991, won the Spanish Cup title in 1992 and played in the Euroleague Final Four in a historic qualification for his humble team but lost to Joventut Badalona and Philips Milano.

After 8 seasons in Estudiantes, Orenga signed for Real Madrid once more with a bench role but they couldn't win the ACB League after losing the 1997 final against FC Barcelona and being defeated in the 1998 semifinals against the champion TDK Manresa for a tight 3-2 serie. In Europe Real Madrid won the Saporta Cup after beating Smash Verona in 1997, a great season for Orenga who was named the MVP of the ACB All Star.

His last 4 seasons Juan Orenga played for Unicaja Málaga (1998-2000) and Cáceres CB (2000-02) before getting retired of playing professional basketball.

=== Spain national team ===
As a player, Orenga played 128 times for the Spain national basketball team. He played at the 1992 Summer Olympic Games, the 1994 FIBA World Championship, and the 1998 FIBA World Championship. He won the bronze medal in the 1991 European Championship of Rome and played the European Championships of 1993, 1995 and 1997.

In youth levels Orenga won the silver medal in the 1984 Tübingen European Championship U17 after losing the final game against Yugoslavia.

== Coaching career ==
=== Estudiantes ===
His first experience as a head coach was the team where he spent the most part of his professional basketball career as a player: Adecco Estudiantes. In the club of Madrid he competed both in ACB and ULEB Cup but after a bad record was fired in February 2006.

=== Spanish national federation: youth teams and assistant coach of the National team ===
Orenga started to coach in the Spanish youth teams in 2007 where he coached the U20 team in the European Championship where his team won the silver medal after losing the final against Serbia, led by Milos Teodosic. In Spain some players as Sergio Llull, Pau Ribas or Xavi Rey played some years after in the National Men's Team.

In 2010, coaching the U20 Spain national team he won one more European medal, in this case, bronze in a team led by Nikola Mirotic. A year after, 2011, in Bilbao, partially the same team won the gold medal against Italy with Mirotic as MVP.

From 2009 to 2012 Juan Orenga worked as assistant coach of Sergio Scariolo in the Spain National Team in three years where Spain won the European Championships of 2009 and 2011 in a great back to back performance. After the European success Spain won the silver medal in the 2012 London Olympics, only defeated in a memorable final against USA.

=== Spain national team ===
After four seasons as assistant coach of Sergio Scariolo and a great success in youth levels winning 3 medals, Orenga was hired as head coach of the Spain national team that competed in the 2013 European Championship where Spain played without some of the stars like Pau Gasol, Serge Ibaka or Juan Carlos Navarro. Spain won the bronze medal after losing the semifinal against France in the extra time. A year after, in the 2014 World Championship held in Spain, and being considered the favourite team to defeat USA, they were defeated once more by France in the quarter-final round. After this result Orenga resigned as coach of the Spain main team.

In 2016, two years after the defeat in the World Championship, Orenga returned to the U20 Spain national team that reached the gold medal in the European Championship defeating Lithuania in the final after a great tournament and Marc Garcia named MVP of the event.

=== Egyptian national team ===
In April 2016, Orenga signed as head coach of the Egyptian national team where he won the XXII Arabian Nations Championship held in El Cairo in a tight final against Morocco in January 2017. This win allowed Egypt to play in the Afrobasket 2017 but Orenga resigned before the championship.

=== Chinese Basketball Association ===
In November 2017, Juan Orenga signed for Jilin Northeast Tigers of the Chinese Basketball Association (CBA) in the middle of the competition where his team registered an 8-30 record.

After his first experience in Jilin Orenga was signed for Guangzhou Loong Lions to compete in 2018-19 season. His first trophy was the Asia League Summer Super 8 won in Macau.

== Achievements ==
=== As player ===
==== Estudiantes ====
- Spanish Cup:
  - 1992

==== Real Madrid ====
- Spanish League:
  - 1984
- Saporta Cup
  - 1984, 1997

==== Spain national Basketball team ====
- EuroBasket
  - Bronze 1991
- U-16 European Championship
  - Bronze 1983

=== As head coach ===
- EuroBasket:
  - Bronze 2013
- U-20 European Championship:
  - Gold 2011, 2016
  - Silver 2007
  - Bronze 2010
