= Carlos Jiménez =

Spanish basketball player (born 1976)

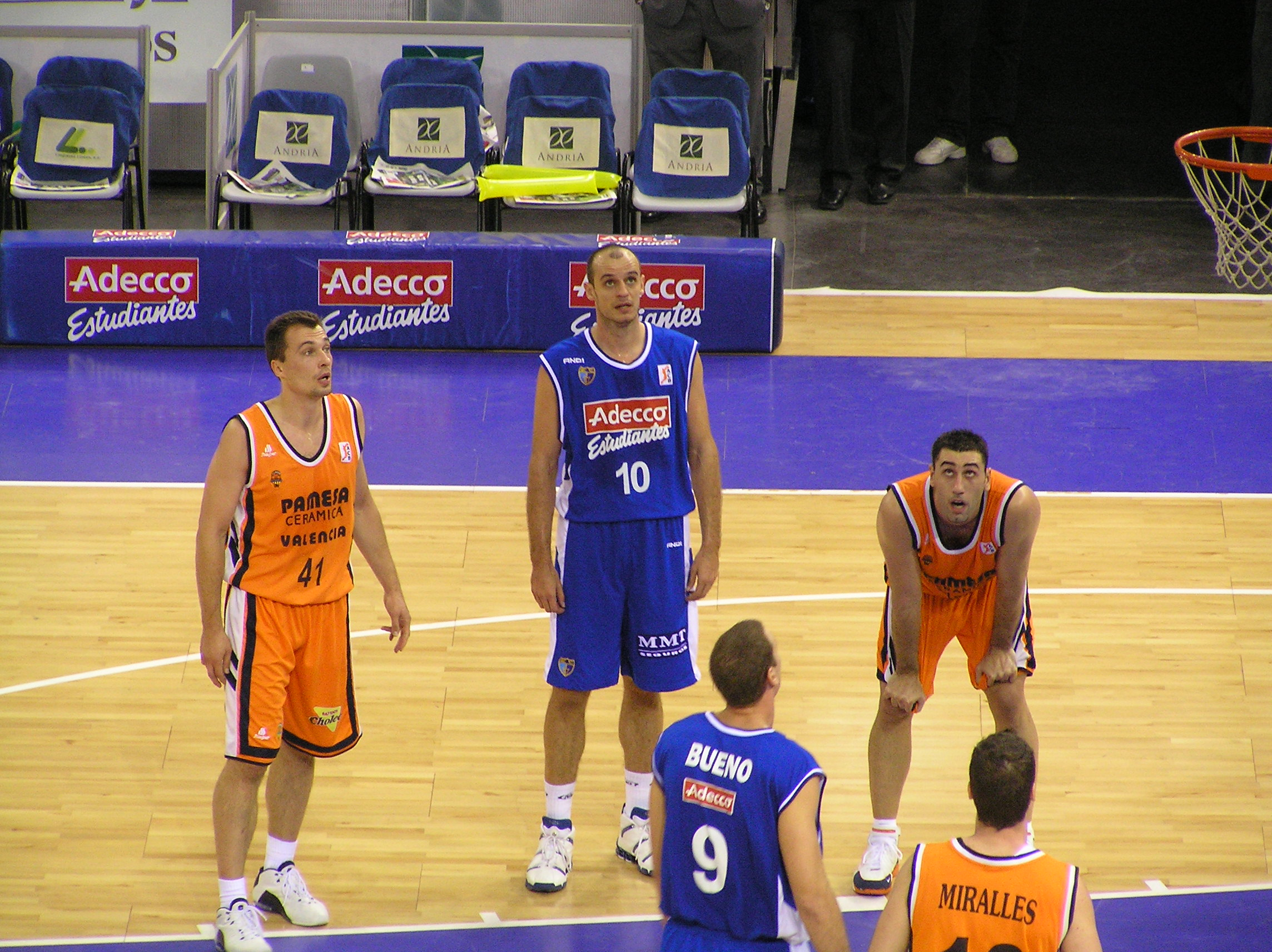
- Carlos Jiménez playing for Estudiantes in November 2005

CB Estudiantes
- League: Liga ACB

Personal information
- Born: 10 February 1976 (age 50) Madrid, Spain
- Listed height: 6 ft 8.75 in (2.05 m)
- Listed weight: 225 lb (102 kg)

Career information
- NBA draft: 1998: undrafted
- Playing career: 1994–2012
- Position: Small forward
- Number: 10

Career history
- 1994–2006: Estudiantes
- 2006–2011: Unicaja
- 2011–2012: Estudiantes
- 2012: Unicaja

Career highlights
- Spanish Cup winner (2000); 2× All-Spanish League Team (2005, 2006)
Medals
Men's basketball
Representing Spain
Summer Olympics
Silver medal – second place	2008 Beijing	National team
FIBA World Cup
Gold medal – first place	2006 Japan	Spain
EuroBasket
Silver medal – second place	1999 France	Spain
Bronze medal – third place	2001 Turkey	Spain
Silver medal – second place	2003 Sweden	Spain
Silver medal – second place	2007 Spain	Spain
FIBA Europe Under-18 Championship
Bronze medal – third place	1994 Israel	U-18 Team

Carlos Jiménez Sánchez (born 10 February 1976) is a Spanish former professional basketball player. He is 2.05 m (6' 8 3/4") tall. His nickname is "suma y sigue Jiménez", which translated into English is, "add and go on Jiménez."

== Player profile ==
He played as a small forward. He was a rebounder, using his 205 cm height and his long arms. He was a defender, and a free throw shooter.

== Professional career ==
In the 2002–03 NBA Season, Jiménez was on the preseason roster of the Sacramento Kings, as he tried out for the club, but he was cut from the team a week before the start of the regular season. He was disappointed that the Kings released him. Jiménez never had another NBA experience.

After playing five seasons for Unicaja Málaga, in August 2011 he returned to Asefa Estudiantes, signing a one-year contract. In April 2012, with six games left to finish the Liga ACB, he decided to retire at the end of the season.

However, on 17 September 2012, he returned to professional basketball, by signing a one-month long contract, with an option to extend it for one more month, with his former team Unicaja. He retired in December 2012.

== Spain national team ==
Jiménez played with the senior Spain national team at the 2006 FIBA World Championship, where he won a gold medal. He also won the silver medal at the 2008 Summer Olympics, as Spain lost against Team USA in the gold medal game. After that Olympic competition, Jiménez announced his retirement from the Spain national team, after having been the captain of that group of players. He retired at the time as the Spanish player with the most medals won in international tournaments for the Spain national team.
