= José Nora =

Spanish basketball player (1940–1993)

Personal information
- Nationality: Spanish
- Born: 10 August 1940 Barcelona, Spain
- Died: 8 June 1993 (aged 52) Barcelona, Spain

Sport
- Sport: Basketball

José Nora (10 August 1940 – 8 June 1993) was a Spanish basketball player. He competed in the men's tournament at the 1960 Summer Olympics.
