= J. J. Arcega-Whiteside =

Spanish gridiron football player (born 1996)

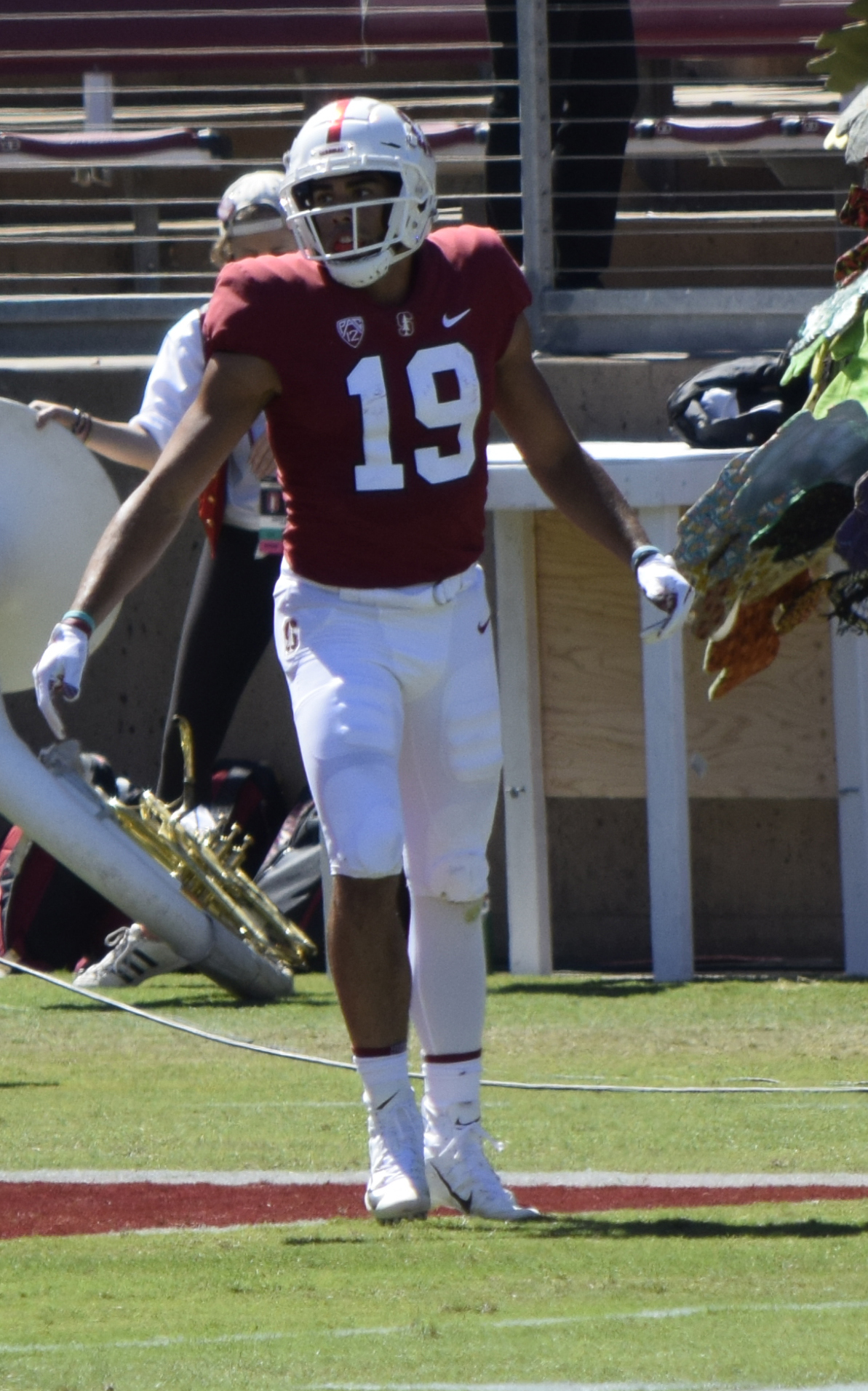
- Arcega-Whiteside with the Stanford Cardinal in 2018

No. 19
- Position: Wide receiver

Personal information
- Born: December 31, 1996 (age 29); Utebo, Zaragoza, Spain
- Listed height: 6 ft 2 in (1.88 m)
- Listed weight: 237 lb (108 kg)

Career information
- High school: Dorman (Roebuck, South Carolina, U.S.)
- College: Stanford (2015–2018)
- NFL draft: 2019: 2nd round, 57th overall pick

Career history
- Philadelphia Eagles (2019–2021); Seattle Seahawks (2022)*; Atlanta Falcons (2023)*; Toronto Argonauts (2024)*
- * Offseason or practice squad member only

Awards and highlights
- Second-team All-Pac-12 (2018)

Career NFL statistics
- Receptions: 16
- Receiving yards: 290
- Receiving touchdowns: 1
- Stats at Pro Football Reference

José Joaquín Arcega-Whiteside (/ɑːrˈθeɪɡə/ ar-THAY-gə; born December 31, 1996) is a Spanish former professional gridiron football player who was a wide receiver in the National Football League (NFL). He played college football for the Stanford Cardinal and was selected by the Philadelphia Eagles in the second round of the 2019 NFL draft. He was also a member of the Seattle Seahawks, Atlanta Falcons, and Toronto Argonauts.

== Early life ==
Arcega-Whiteside was born in Utebo, Spain, on December 31, 1996, and moved to South Carolina in the United States when he was six. He attended Paul M. Dorman High School in Roebuck, South Carolina. During his career, he had 207 receptions for 3,779 yards and 38 touchdowns. Arcega-Whiteside committed to Stanford University to play college football.

== College career ==
After redshirting his first year at Stanford in 2015, Arcega-Whiteside played in 12 games as a sophomore, recording 24 receptions for 379 yards and five touchdowns. As a junior in 2017, he had 48 receptions for 781 yards and nine touchdowns. As a senior in 2018, he had a season record of 63 receptions for 1,059 yards and 14 touchdowns. After the season, Arcega-Whiteside declared for the 2019 NFL draft.

=== College statistics ===
Year	Team	GP	Receiving			
Year	Team	GP	Rec	Yds	Avg	TD
2016	Stanford	10	24	379	15.8	5
2017	Stanford	11	48	781	16.3	9
2018	Stanford	12	63	1,059	16.8	14
Career		33	135	2,219	16.4	28

== Professional career ==
Pre-draft measurables
Height	Weight	Arm length	Hand span	Wingspan	40-yard dash	10-yard split	20-yard split	20-yard shuttle	Three-cone drill	Vertical jump	Broad jump
6 ft 2 in (1.88 m)	225 lb (102 kg)	33 1/4 in (0.84 m)	9 1/2 in (0.24 m)	6 ft 7 7/8 in (2.03 m)	4.50 s	1.58 s	2.64 s	4.41 s	7.23 s	34.0 in (0.86 m)	9 ft 11 in (3.02 m)
All values from NFL Combine/Pro Day

=== Philadelphia Eagles ===
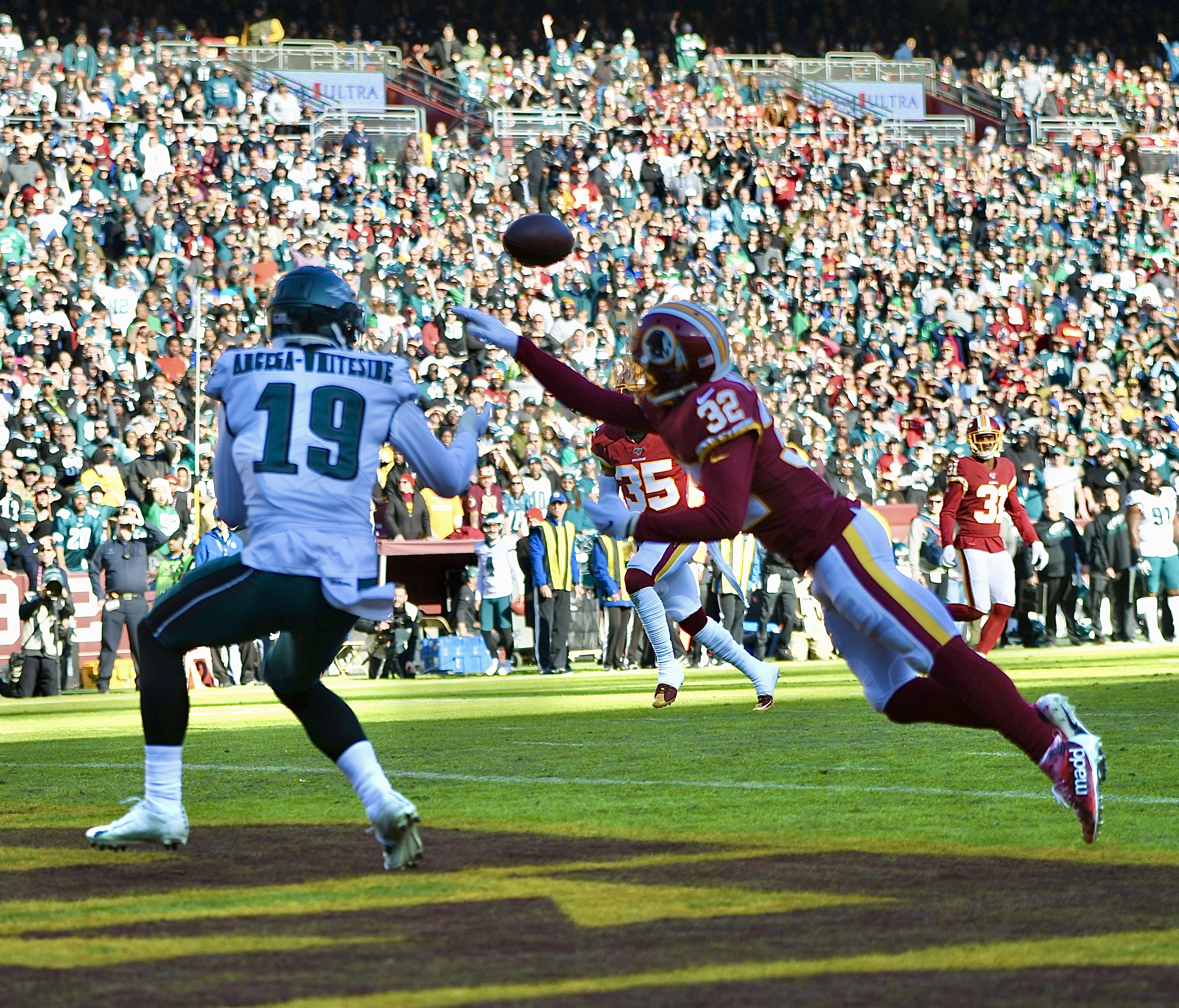
Arcega-Whiteside (left) in a game against the Washington Redskins in 2019

Arcega-Whiteside was selected by the Philadelphia Eagles in the second round (57th overall) of the 2019 NFL draft. In Week 13, in the 37–31 loss to the Miami Dolphins, Arcega-Whiteside caught one pass for 15 yards for his first professional touchdown. In 2019, he caught ten passes for 169 yards and one touchdown.

In Week 6 of the 2020 season against the Baltimore Ravens, Arcega-Whiteside caught his first two-point conversion and recovered a Miles Sanders fumble for a touchdown in the 30–28 loss. Arcega-Whiteside was placed on the reserve/COVID-19 list by the Eagles on November 19, 2020, and activated on December 2. Overall, his second season was less productive, catching only 4 passes over 8 games played.

Arcega-Whiteside entered the 2021 season fifth on the Eagles wide receiver depth chart. He was placed on injured reserve on January 10, 2022. He finished the season with just two catches for 39 yards and no touchdowns through 16 games.

During the 2022 offseason, Arcega-Whiteside converted from wide receiver to tight end.

=== Seattle Seahawks ===
On August 15, 2022, Arcega-Whiteside was traded to the Seattle Seahawks in exchange for cornerback Ugo Amadi. He was waived on August 30, and signed to the practice squad the next day. Arcega-Whiteside was released on November 1.

=== Atlanta Falcons ===
Following a tryout, the Atlanta Falcons signed Arcega-Whiteside on May 22, 2023. He was released on August 29.

=== Toronto Argonauts ===
On January 8, 2024, it was announced that Arcega-Whiteside had signed with the Toronto Argonauts of the Canadian Football League. He was placed on the reserve/retired list on April 24.

== Personal life ==
Both of his parents, Joaquín Arcega and Valorie Whiteside, played professional basketball in Spain. Arcega is Spanish and Whiteside is an African American from South Carolina. Valorie Whiteside played college basketball at Appalachian State and is the all-time leading scorer in women's basketball for the Southern Conference. She later played professionally in Europe and met Joaquín Arcega in Spain. Two of Arcega's uncles, Fernando Arcega and José Arcega, also played basketball professionally in Spain and represented Spain in the Olympics.

While at Stanford, Arcega-Whiteside majored in international relations. He interned with the office of former Secretary of State Condoleezza Rice.

Arcega-Whiteside and Brianna Lorena Garcia got married in June 2022. Garcia was a Golden State Warriors dancer.
