= Juan de la Cruz (basketball) =

Argentine-born Spanish basketball player

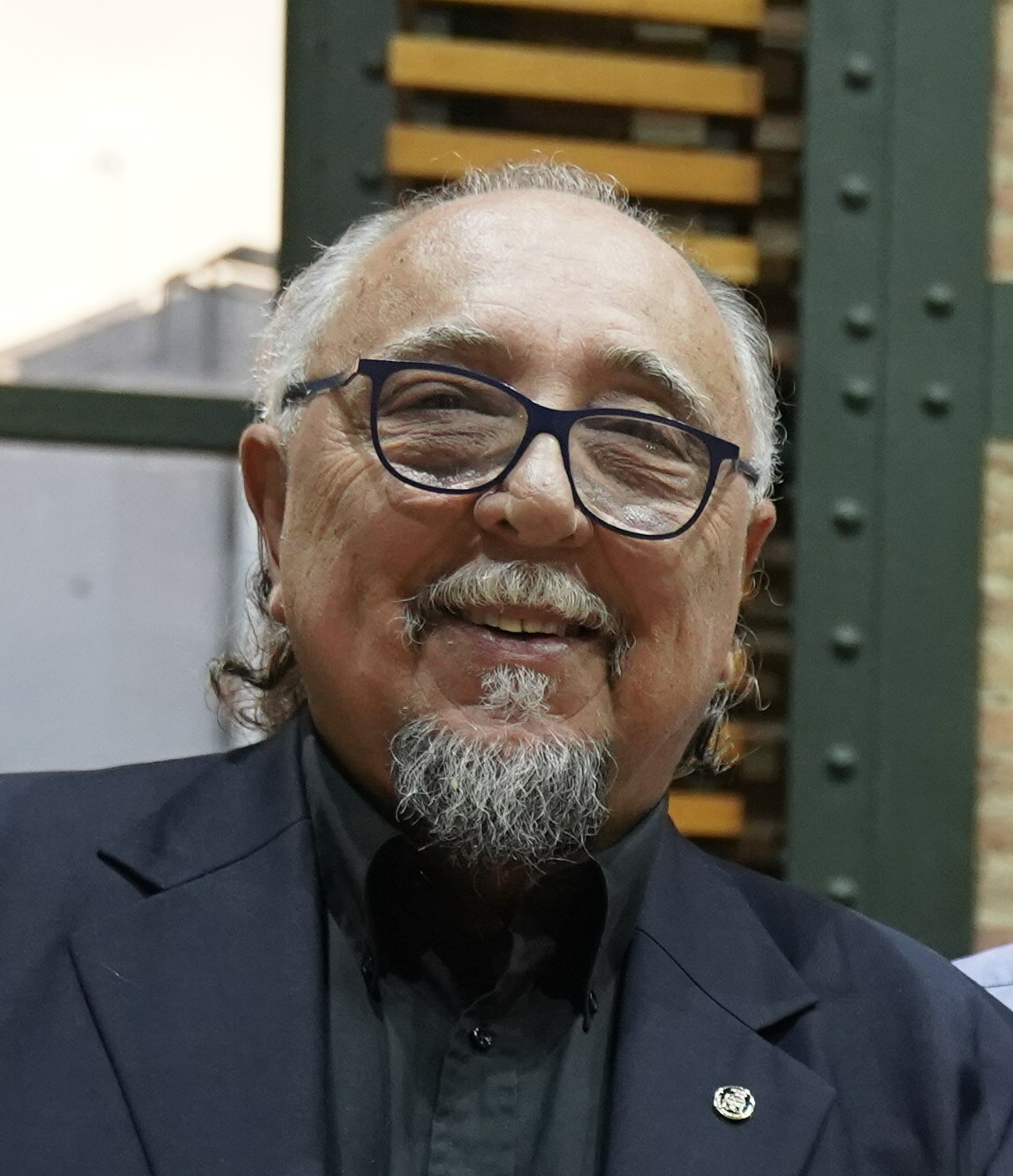

Personal information
- Born: February 6, 1954 (age 72) Buenos Aires, Argentina
- Listed height: 206 cm (6 ft 9 in)
- Listed weight: 196 lb (89 kg)

Career information
- Playing career: 1975–1996
- Position: Center

Career history
- 1975–1987: FC Barcelona
- 1987–1989: CB Valladolid
- 1989–1990: Bàsquet Manresa
- 1990–1991: Taugrés Vitoria
- 1991–1992: Prohaci Mallorca
- 1994–1995: CB Inca
- 1995–1996: Palma Basket Club

Career highlights
- 4× FIBA European Selection Team (1980, 1981 (2×), 1982); 3× Spanish League champion (1981, 1983, 1987); 7× Spanish Cup winner (1978–1983, 1987); 2× FIBA Saporta Cup champion (1985, 1986); FIBA Korać Cup champion (1987); FIBA Club World Cup champion (1985)
Medals
Men's basketball
Representing Spain
Summer Olympic Games
Silver medal – second place	1984 Los Angeles
FIBA EuroBasket
Silver medal – second place	1983 France

Juan Domingo de la Cruz Fermanelli (born 6 February 1954) is an Argentine-born Spanish basketball player. He competed in the men's tournament at the 1980 Summer Olympics and the 1984 Summer Olympics.

Born in Buenos Aires, de la Cruz arrived to FC Barcelona in 1975 and eventually received the Spanish nationality and was capped by the Spanish national team.
