= José Manuel Beirán =

Spanish basketball player

Personal information
- Born: 7 February 1956 (age 70) León, Castilla y León, Spain
- Listed height: 6 ft 5 in (1.96 m)
- Listed weight: 198 lb (90 kg)

Career information
- Playing career: 1974–1990
- Position: Small forward

Career history
- 1974–1975: Real Madrid
- 1976–1977: CB Valladolid
- 1978–1980: Real Madrid
- 1980–1981: Castilla-Vallehermoso
- 1982–1983: Real Madrid
- 1983–1986: CD Cajamadrid
- 1986–1987: CB Valladolid
- 1988–1990: Tenerife Nº1

José Manuel Beirán Lozano (born 7 February 1956) is a former Spanish basketball player with Real Madrid Baloncesto of the Liga ACB. He was born in León. He also played for Spain at the 1984 Summer Olympics, where he scored 8 points in 4 appearances. Spain won a silver medal in the games.

== Personal life ==
His son Javier is also a professional basketball player.
