= Santiago Navarro =

Spanish basketball player (1936–1993)

Personal information
- Nationality: Spanish
- Born: 17 October 1936 Barcelona, Spain
- Died: 8 October 1993 (aged 56)

Sport
- Sport: Basketball

Santiago Navarro (17 October 1936 – 8 October 1993) was a Spanish basketball player. He competed in the men's tournament at the 1960 Summer Olympics.
