= José Arcega =

Spanish basketball player

Personal information
- Born: 31 May 1964 (age 62) Zaragoza, Spain
- Listed height: 6 ft 4 in (1.93 m)

Career information
- NBA draft: 1986: undrafted
- Playing career: 1982–2001
- Position: Point guard

Career history
- 1982–1996: CB Zaragoza
- 1996–1997: Taugrés Vitoria
- 1997–2001: CB Cáceres

José Ángel Arcega Aperte (born 31 May 1964) is a retired basketball player from Spain. Arcega competed in the men's tournament at the 1992 Summer Olympics. His brother Fernando also represent Spain in the Olympics. Arcega's nephew, J. J. Arcega-Whiteside, played for the Philadelphia Eagles and Seattle Seahawks.
