= Juan Antonio Martínez (basketball) =

Spanish basketball player (born 1944)

Personal information
- Nationality: Spanish
- Born: 25 May 1944 (age 82) Madrid, Spain

Sport
- Sport: Basketball

Juan Antonio Martínez (born 25 May 1944) is a Spanish basketball player. He competed in the men's tournament at the 1968 Summer Olympics.
