= Fernando Arcega =

Spanish basketball player

Personal information
- Born: 3 September 1960 (age 66) Zaragoza, Spain
- Listed height: 6 ft 8 in (2.03 m)
- Listed weight: 211 lb (96 kg)

Career information
- NBA draft: 1982: undrafted
- Playing career: 1979–1995
- Position: Forward

Career history
- 1979–1981: CN Helios
- 1981–1995: CB Zaragoza
Medals
Men's basketball
Representing Spain
Olympic Games
Silver medal – second place	1984 Los Angeles
EuroBasket
Silver medal – second place	1983 France
Bronze medal – third place	1991 Italy
European U-18 Championship
Bronze medal – third place	1978 Italy	Team

Fernando Arcega Aperte (Spanish pronunciation: [feɾˈnando aɾˈθeɣa]; born 3 September 1960 in Ainzón, Zaragoza, Aragón) is a retired basketball player from Spain. He used to play as forward.

Arcega earned 121 caps for the Spain national basketball team and played at three Olympic Games. He was silver medallist for Spain in 1984 at Olympic Games and in 1983 at Eurobasket, and bronze medalist in 1991 at Eurobasket. Arcega won two Spanish Cups (1984, 1989) playing for CB Zaragoza (as CAI Zaragoza).

== Personal life ==
Two of his brothers, José and Joaquín, also played professional basketball in Spain. Jose did also represent Spain in the Olympics.

Arcega's nephew, J. J. Arcega-Whiteside, played American football for the Philadelphia Eagles.
