= Enrique Andreu =

Spanish basketball player

Personal information
- Born: 20 October 1967 (age 59) Valencia, Spain
- Listed height: 6 ft 9 in (2.06 m)

Career information
- NBA draft: 1989: undrafted
- Playing career: 1986–2001
- Position: Center

Career history
- 1986-1988: Llíria
- 1988-1993: CB Zaragoza
- 1993-1998: FC Barcelona
- 1998–2000: Joventut Badalona
- 2000–2001: Ionikos Nea Filadelfia

Enrique 'Quique' Andreu Balbuena (born 20 October 1967) is a Spanish basketball player. He competed in the men's tournament at the 1988 Summer Olympics and the 1992 Summer Olympics.

== Career ==
Andreu started his career with CB Zaragoza. In 1993 he became the most expensive player in Spanish basketball after Barcelona paid 100 million pesetas (600.00 euros) to sign him. In 1998 he moved to Joventut Badalona and he later ended his career with Ionikos Nea Filadelfia.
