= Jesús Codina =

Spanish basketball player

Personal information
- Full name: Jesús Codina Burgon
- Nickname: Chus
- Nationality: Spanish
- Born: 18 December 1938; Segovia, Spain
- Died: 19 July 1999 (aged 60); Madrid, Spain
- Height: 179 cm (5 ft 10 in)
- Weight: 71 kg (157 lb)

Sport
- Sport: Basketball
- Club: CB Estudiantes (1958-64); CB Vigo (1964-65); Picadero JC (1965-73)

Jesús Codina Burgon (Note: In this Spanish name, the first or paternal surname is Codina and the second or maternal family name is Burgon.) (18 December 1938 – 19 July 1999) was a Spanish basketball player. He competed in the men's tournament at the 1960 Summer Olympics and the 1968 Summer Olympics.
