= Miguel Estrada (basketball) =

Spanish basketball player

Personal information
- Nationality: Spanish
- Born: 16 June 1950 (age 75) Madrid, Spain

Sport
- Sport: Basketball

Miguel Estrada (born 16 June 1950) is a Spanish basketball player. He competed in the men's tournament at the 1972 Summer Olympics.
