= Juan Martos =

Spanish basketball player

Personal information
- Nationality: Spanish
- Born: 15 June 1939 (age 85); Barcelona, Spain

Sport
- Sport: Basketball

Juan Martos (born 15 June 1939) is a Spanish basketball player. He competed in the men's tournament at the 1960 Summer Olympics.
