= José Sagi-Vela =

Spanish basketball player

Personal information
- Nationality: Spanish
- Born: 4 October 1944; Madrid, Spain
- Died: 20 August 1991 (aged 46)

Sport
- Sport: Basketball

José Sagi-Vela (4 October 1944 – 20 August 1991) was a Spanish basketball player. He competed in the men's tournament at the 1968 Summer Olympics.
