= Carmelo Cabrera =

Spanish basketball player

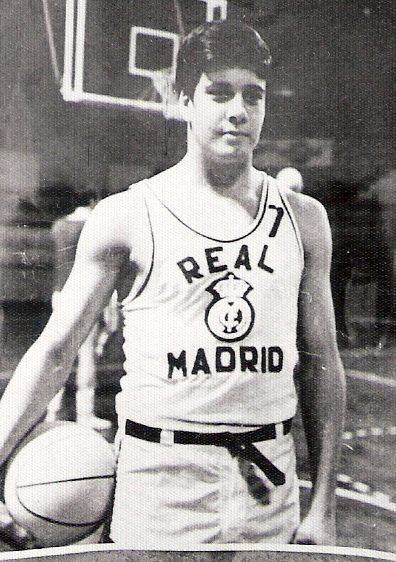
- Cabrera in 1968

Personal information
- Born: 6 January 1950 (age 75); Las Palmas, Spain
- Listed height: 183 cm (6 ft 0 in)

Career information
- Playing career: 1968–1988
- Position: Point guard

Career history
- 1968–1979: Real Madrid
- 1979–1981: CB Valladolid
- 1981–1988: CB Canarias

Career highlights and awards
- 10× Spanish League champion (1969-1977, 1979); 7× Spanish Cup winner (1970–1975, 1977); 2× European Cup champion (1974, 1978); 3x FIBA Club World Cup champion (1976-1978)
Medals
Men's basketball
Representing Spain
EuroBasket
Silver medal – second place	1973 Spain	Spain

Carmelo Cabrera Domínguez (born 6 January 1950) is a Spanish retired professional basketball player. He competed in the men's tournament at the 1972 Summer Olympics.
