= Enrique Margall =

Spanish basketball player

Personal information
- Nationality: Spanish
- Born: 28 August 1944; Barcelona, Spain
- Died: 24 October 1986 (aged 42); Menorca, Spain

Sport
- Sport: Basketball

Enrique Margall (28 August 1944 – 24 October 1986) was a Spanish basketball player. He competed in the men's tournament at the 1968 Summer Olympics and the 1972 Summer Olympics.
