= Manuel Flores (basketball) =

Spanish basketball player (born 1951)

Personal information
- Full name: Manuel Flores Sánchez
- Nationality: Spanish
- Born: 23 July 1951 (age 73); Mérida, Spain

Sport
- Sport: Basketball

Manuel Flores Sánchez (born 23 July 1951) is a Spanish basketball player. He competed in the men's tournament at the 1980 Summer Olympics.
