= Gonzalo Sagi-Vela =

Spanish basketball player

Personal information
- Born: 25 February 1950 Madrid, Spain
- Listed height: 1.85 m (6 ft 1 in)

Career information
- Playing career: 1968–1985
- Position: Small forward

Career history
- 1968–1979: Estudiantes
- 1979–1983: Joventut Badalona
- 1983–1985: CB Caja de Ronda

Career highlights
- Korac Cup winner (1981)
Medals
Men's basketball
Representing Spain
European Championships
Silver medal – second place	1973 Spain	Spain

Gonzalo Sagi-Vela Fernández-Pérez (born 25 February 1950) is a Spanish basketball player. He competed in the men's tournament at the 1972 Summer Olympics.
