= Spain national basketball team results =

Results of Spain men's national basketball team since 1935, as recognized by the Spanish Basketball Federation: Olympic Games, World Cups, EuroBaskets and the respective qualifying tournaments, as well as seven editions of the Mediterranean Games when the A-team was involved. Also included, friendly games and tournaments against national teams, including nine games of the unofficial 1966 "Extraordinary" World Championship, and five in the 1990 Goodwill Games.

Key
MR	Main Round	R16	Round of 16
1R	First Round / Preliminary Round	QF	Quarter-final
2R	Second Round / Final Round	SF	Semifinal
CR	Classification Round	3P	Bronze Match
		F	Final

Note: updated through 31 August 2026

M	OPPONENT	F	A	+/-	TOP SCORER(S)	PTS	EVENT	DATE	LOCATION
1122	Montenegro						2027 World Cup qualification 2R	2027.03.01	(ESP)
1121	Portugal						2027 World Cup qualification 2R	2027.02.26	(POR)
1120	Greece						2027 World Cup qualification 2R	2026.11.29	(ESP)
1119	Montenegro						2027 World Cup qualification 2R	2026.11.26	(MNE)
1118	Greece	106	108	-2	Joel Parra	18	2027 World Cup qualification 2R	2026.08.31	Athens (GRE)
1117	Portugal	89	95	-6	Darío Brizuela	19	2027 World Cup qualification 2R	2026.08.28	Zaragoza (ESP)
1116	Georgia	89	91	-2	Willy Hernangómez	19	2027 World Cup qualification 1R	2026.07.05	Tbilisi (GEO)
1115	Denmark	109	81	+28	Pierre Oriola	20	2027 World Cup qualification 1R	2026.07.02	Madrid (ESP)
1114	Ukraine	78	64	+14	Francis Alonso	12	2027 World Cup qualification 1R	2026.03.02	Oviedo (ESP)
1113	Ukraine	86	66	+20	Cárdenas, Bassas	16	2027 World Cup qualification 1R	2026.02.27	Riga (LAT)
1112	Georgia	90	61	+29	Santiago Yusta	17	2027 World Cup qualification 1R	2025.11.30	La Laguna (ESP)
1111	Denmark	74	64	+10	Jaime Fernández	15	2027 World Cup qualification 1R	2025.11.27	Farum (DEN)
1110	Greece	86	90	-4	Jaime Pradilla	14	2025 EuroBasket 1R	2025.09.04	Limassol (CYP)
1109	Italy	63	67	-4	Santi Aldama	19	2025 EuroBasket 1R	2025.09.02	Limassol (CYP)
1108	Cyprus	91	47	+44	Willy Hernangómez	19	2025 EuroBasket 1R	2025.08.31	Limassol (CYP)
1107	Bosnia and Herzegovina	88	67	+21	Santi Aldama	19	2025 EuroBasket 1R	2025.08.30	Limassol (CYP)
1106	Georgia	69	83	-14	Juancho Hernangómez	13	2025 EuroBasket 1R	2025.08.28	Limassol (CYP)
1105	Germany	78	95	-17	Sergio de Larrea	14	2025 Friendly	2025.08.23	Cologne (GER)
1104	Germany	105	106	-1	Darío Brizuela	22	2025 Friendly	2025.08.21	Madrid (ESP)
1103	France	73	78	-5	Santiago Yusta	19	2025 Friendly	2025.08.16	Paris (FRA)
1102	France	67	75	-8	Willy Hernangómez	15	2025 Friendly	2025.08.14	Badalona (ESP)
1101	Czech Republic	87	73	+14	Josep Puerto	15	2025 Friendly	2025.08.07	Málaga (ESP)
1100	Portugal	74	76	-2	López-Arostegui, Pradilla	9	2025 Friendly	2025.08.05	Málaga (ESP)
1099	Belgium	59	52	+7	Xabier López-Arostegui	13	2025 EuroBasket qualification	2025.02.23	León (ESP)
1098	Latvia	66	83	-17	Santiago Yusta	15	2025 EuroBasket qualification	2025.02.20	Riga (LAT)
1097	Slovakia	84	71	+13	Santiago Yusta	25	2025 EuroBasket qualification	2024.11.25	Ourense (ESP)
1096	Slovakia	76	72	+4	Santiago Yusta	21	2025 EuroBasket qualification	2024.11.22	Bratislava (SVK)
1095	Canada	85	88	-3	Darío Brizuela	17	2024 Olympics 1R	2024.08.02	Lille (FRA)
1094	Greece	84	77	+7	Santi Aldama	19	2024 Olympics 1R	2024.07.30	Lille (FRA)
1093	Australia	80	92	-12	Santi Aldama	27	2024 Olympics 1R	2024.07.27	Lille (FRA)
1092	Puerto Rico	107	84	+23	Santi Aldama	20	2024 Friendly	2024.07.23	Madrid
1091	Argentina	76	72	+4	Santi Aldama	14	2024 Friendly	2024.07.19	Guadalajara
1090	Bahamas	86	78	+8	Lorenzo Brown	18	2024 Olympics qualification	2024.07.07	Valencia
1089	Finland	81	74	+7	Willy Hernangómez	28	2024 Olympics qualification	2024.07.06	Valencia
1088	Angola	89	81	+8	Santi Aldama	24	2024 Olympics qualification	2024.07.03	Valencia
1087	Lebanon	104	59	+45	Santi Aldama	17	2024 Olympics qualification	2024.07.02	Valencia
1086	Dominican Republic	84	74	+10	Lorenzo Brown	14	2024 Friendly	2024.06.28	Madrid
1085	Italy	84	87	-3	Willy Hernangómez	23	2024 Friendly	2024.06.25	Madrid
1084	Belgium	53	58	-5	Darío Brizuela	14	2025 EuroBasket qualification	2024.02.25	Charleroi (BEL)
1083	Latvia	75	79	-4	Darío Brizuela	16	2025 EuroBasket qualification	2024.02.22	Zaragoza
1082	Canada	85	88	-3	Willy Hernangómez	25	2023 World Cup 2R	2023.09.03	Jakarta (INI)
1081	Latvia	69	74	-5	Willy Hernangómez	14	2023 World Cup 2R	2023.09.01	Jakarta (INI)
1080	Iran	85	65	+20	Juan Hernangómez	21	2023 World Cup 1R	2023.08.30	Jakarta (INI)
1079	Brazil	96	78	+18	Santi Aldama	15	2023 World Cup 1R	2023.08.28	Jakarta (INI)
1078	Ivory Coast	94	64	+30	Willy Hernangómez	22	2023 World Cup 1R	2023.08.26	Jakarta (INI)
1077	Dominican Republic	86	77	+9	Juan Núñez	16	2023 Friendly	2023.08.19	Granada
1076	Canada	80	85	-5	Juan Hernangómez	12	2023 Friendly	2023.08.17	Granada
1075	United States	88	98	-10	Santi Aldama	14	2023 Friendly	2023.08.12	Málaga
1074	Slovenia	99	79	+20	Santi Aldama	18	2023 Friendly	2023.08.10	Málaga
1073	Venezuela	87	57	+30	Juan Hernangómez	27	2023 Friendly	2023.08.04	Madrid
1072	Italy	68	72	-4	Tyson Pérez	15	2023 World Cup qualification 2R	2023.02.26	Cáceres
1071	Iceland	80	61	+19	Miquel Salvo	18	2023 World Cup qualification 2R	2023.02.23	Reykjavík (ISL)
1070	Netherlands	84	72	+12	Darío Brizuela	16	2023 World Cup qualification 2R	2022.11.14	Huelva
1069	Italy	88	84	+4	Jaime Fernández	28	2023 World Cup qualification 2R	2022.11.11	Pesaro (ITA)
1068	France	88	76	+12	Juan Hernangómez	27	2022 EuroBasket F	2022.09.18	Berlin (GER)
1067	Germany	96	91	+5	Lorenzo Brown	29	2022 EuroBasket SF	2022.09.16	Berlin (GER)
1066	Finland	100	90	+10	Willy Hernangómez	27	2022 EuroBasket QF	2022.09.13	Berlin (GER)
1065	Lithuania	102	94	+8	Lorenzo Brown	28	2022 EuroBasket R16	2022.09.10	Berlin (GER)
1064	Turkey	72	69	+3	Willy Hernangómez	15	2022 EuroBasket 1R	2022.09.07	Tbilisi (GEO)
1063	Montenegro	82	65	+17	Darío Brizuela	18	2022 EuroBasket 1R	2022.09.06	Tbilisi (GEO)
1062	Belgium	73	83	-10	Willy Hernangómez	18	2022 EuroBasket 1R	2022.09.04	Tbilisi (GEO)
1061	Georgia	90	64	+26	Willy Hernangómez	14	2022 EuroBasket 1R	2022.09.03	Tbilisi (GEO)
1060	Bulgaria	114	87	+27	Lorenzo Brown	17	2022 EuroBasket 1R	2022.09.01	Tbilisi (GEO)
1059	Netherlands	86	64	+22	Darío Brizuela	13	2023 World Cup qualification 2R	2022.08.27	Almere (NED)
1058	Iceland	87	57	+30	Willy Hernangómez	19	2023 World Cup qualification 2R	2022.08.24	Pamplona
1057	Lithuania	76	78	-2	Lorenzo Brown	18	2022 Friendly	2022.08.18	Vilnius (LTU)
1056	Lithuania	77	82	-5	Willy Hernangómez	22	2022 Friendly	2022.08.16	Las Palmas
1055	Greece	87	80	+7	Willy Hernangómez	23	2022 Friendly	2022.08.11	Madrid
1054	Greece	70	86	-16	Willy Hernangómez	15	2022 Friendly	2022.08.09	Athens (GRE)
1053	Ukraine	77	76	+1	Jaime Fernández	14	2023 World Cup qualification 1R	2022.07.07	Riga (LAT)
1052	Georgia	76	82	-6	Xabier López-Arostegui	14	2023 World Cup qualification 1R	2022.07.04	Tbilisi (GEO)
1051	North Macedonia	80	44	+36	Sebas Saiz	19	2023 World Cup qualification 1R	2022.07.01	Zaragoza
1050	Ukraine	88	74	+14	Xabier López-Arostegui	15	2023 World Cup qualification 1R	2022.02.24	Córdoba
1049	Georgia	89	61	+28	Xabier López-Arostegui	14	2023 World Cup qualification 1R	2021.11.29	Jaén
1048	North Macedonia	94	65	+29	Yankuba Sima	17	2023 World Cup qualification 1R	2021.11.26	Skopje (MKD)
1047	United States	81	95	-14	Ricky Rubio	38	2020 Olympics QF	2021.08.03	Saitama (JPN)
1046	Slovenia	87	95	-8	Ricky Rubio	18	2020 Olympics 1R	2021.08.01	Saitama (JPN)
1045	Argentina	81	71	+10	Ricky Rubio	26	2020 Olympics 1R	2021.07.29	Saitama (JPN)
1044	Japan	88	77	+11	Ricky Rubio	20	2020 Olympics 1R	2021.07.26	Saitama (JPN)
1043	United States	76	83	-7	Ricky Rubio	23	2021 Friendly	2021.07.19	Las Vegas (USA)
1042	France	87	79	+8	Ricky Rubio	23	2021 Friendly	2021.07.10	Paris (FRA)
1041	France	86	77	+9	Ricky Rubio	16	2021 Friendly	2021.07.08	Madrid
1040	Iran	96	53	+43	Ricky Rubio	10	2021 Friendly	2021.07.05	Madrid
1039	Iran	88	61	+27	Alberto Abalde	13	2021 Friendly	2021.07.03	Valencia
1038	Israel	78	73	+5	Darío Brizuela	18	2021 EuroBasket qualification	2021.02.21	Gliwice (POL)
1037	Poland	89	88	+1	Jonathan Barreiro	24	2021 EuroBasket qualification	2021.02.19	Gliwice (POL)
1036	Romania	94	41	+53	Darío Brizuela	17	2021 EuroBasket qualification	2020.11.30	Valencia
1035	Israel	87	95	-8	Quino Colom	24	2021 EuroBasket qualification	2020.11.28	Valencia
1034	Poland	69	80	-11	Dani Díez	16	2021 EuroBasket qualification	2020.02.23	Zaragoza
1033	Romania	84	71	+13	Dani Díez	21	2021 EuroBasket qualification	2020.02.20	Cluj-Napoca (ROM)
1032	Argentina	95	75	+20	Ricky Rubio	20	2019 World Cup F	2019.09.15	Beijing (CHN)
1031	Australia	95	88	+7	Marc Gasol	33	2019 World Cup SF	2019.09.13	Beijing (CHN)
1030	Poland	90	78	+12	Ricky Rubio	19	2019 World Cup QF	2019.09.10	Shanghai (CHN)
1029	Serbia	81	69	+12	Ricky Rubio	19	2019 World Cup 2R	2019.09.08	Wuhan (CHN)
1028	Italy	67	60	+7	Juan Hernangómez	16	2019 World Cup 2R	2019.09.06	Wuhan (CHN)
1027	Iran	73	65	+8	Marc Gasol	16	2019 World Cup 1R	2019.09.04	Guangzhou (CHN)
1026	Puerto Rico	73	63	+10	Marc Gasol	19	2019 World Cup 1R	2019.09.02	Guangzhou (CHN)
1025	Tunisia	101	62	+39	Ricky Rubio	17	2019 World Cup 1R	2019.08.31	Guangzhou (CHN)
1024	Russia	55	74	-19	Willy Hernangómez	26	2019 Friendly	2019.08.28	NIngbo (CHN)
1023	Argentina	84	76	+8	Ricky Rubio	25	2019 Friendly	2019.08.27	NIngbo (CHN)
1022	Dominican Republic	102	70	+32	Ricky Rubio	20	2019 Friendly	2019.08.22	Madrid
1021	United States	81	90	-9	Marc Gasol	19	2019 Friendly	2019.08.16	Anaheim (USA)
1020	DR Congo	96	64	+32	Willy Hernangómez	24	2019 Friendly	2019.08.10	Málaga
1019	Ivory Coast	79	62	+17	W. Hernangómez, Rubio	14	2019 Friendly	2019.08.09	Málaga
1018	Lithuania	78	70	+8	Willy Hernangómez	23	2019 Friendly	2019.08.02	Pamplona
1017	Turkey	74	58	+16	Darío Brizuela	16	2019 World Cup qualification 2R	2019.02.25	La Laguna
1016	Latvia	67	62	+5	Darío Brizuela	17	2019 World Cup qualification 2R	2019.02.22	Riga (LAT)
1015	Ukraine	72	68	+4	Jaime Fernández	17	2019 World Cup qualification 2R	2018.12.02	La Laguna
1014	Turkey	67	71	-4	Darío Brizuela	18	2019 World Cup qualification 2R	2018.11.29	Ankara (TUR)
1013	Latvia	85	82	+3	Quino Colom	18	2019 World Cup qualification 2R	2018.09.17	Madrid
1012	Ukraine	65	76	-11	Quino Colom	15	2019 World Cup qualification 2R	2018.09.14	Kyiv (UKR)
1011	Belarus	80	60	+20	Juan Hernangómez	11	2019 World Cup qualification 1R	2018.07.01	Málaga
1010	Slovenia	83	72	+11	Quino Colom	16	2019 World Cup qualification 1R	2018.06.28	Ljubljana (SLO)
1009	Montenegro	79	67	+12	Pablo Aguilar	16	2019 World Cup qualification 1R	2018.02.26	Zaragoza
1008	Belarus	84	82	+2	Quino Colom	17	2019 World Cup qualification 1R	2018.02.23	Minsk (BLR)
1007	Slovenia	92	84	+8	Quino Colom	25	2019 World Cup qualification 1R	2017.11.26	Burgos
1006	Montenegro	79	66	+13	Quino Colom, Fran Vázquez	15	2019 World Cup qualification 1R	2017.11.24	Podgorica (MNE)
1005	Russia	93	85	+8	Pau Gasol	26	2017 EuroBasket 3P	2017.09.17	Istanbul (TUR)
1004	Slovenia	72	92	-20	Pau Gasol	16	2017 EuroBasket SF	2017.09.14	Istanbul (TUR)
1003	Germany	84	72	+12	Marc Gasol	28	2017 EuroBasket QF	2017.09.12	Istanbul (TUR)
1002	Turkey	73	56	+17	Ricky Rubio	15	2017 EuroBasket R16	2017.09.10	Istanbul (TUR)
1001	Hungary	87	64	+23	Pau Gasol	20	2017 EuroBasket 1R	2017.09.07	Cluj Napoca (ROU)
1000	Croatia	79	73	+6	Ricky Rubio	13	2017 EuroBasket 1R	2017.09.05	Cluj Napoca (ROU)
999	Romania	91	50	+41	Juan Hernangómez	18	2017 EuroBasket 1R	2017.09.04	Cluj Napoca (ROU)
998	Czech Republic	93	56	+37	Pau Gasol	26	2017 EuroBasket 1R	2017.09.02	Cluj Napoca (ROU)
997	Montenegro	99	60	+39	Willy Hernangómez	18	2017 EuroBasket 1R	2017.09.01	Cluj Napoca (ROU)
996	Lithuania	79	78	+1			2017 Friendly	2017.08.25	Vilnius (LTU)
995	Belgium	88	72	+16			2017 Friendly	2017.08.23	Brussels (BEL)
994	Venezuela	90	62	+28			2017 Friendly	2017.08.20	Málaga
993	Senegal	80	69	+11			2017 Friendly	2017.08.18	Melilla
992	Venezuela	90	44	+46			2017 Friendly	2017.08.15	Madrid
991	Belgium	71	89	-18			2017 Friendly	2017.08.09	Tenerife
990	Tunisia	71	45	+26			2017 Friendly	2017.08.08	Tenerife
989	Israel	76	56	+20			2017 Friendly	2017.07.23	Estepona
988	Israel	90	70	+20			2017 Friendly	2017.07.22	Benahavís
987	Australia	89	88	+1	Pau Gasol	31	2016 Olympics 3P	2016.08.20	Rio (BRA)
986	United States	76	82	-6	Pau Gasol	23	2016 Olympics SF	2016.08.19	Rio (BRA)
985	France	92	67	+25	Nikola Mirotić	23	2016 Olympics QF	2016.08.17	Rio (BRA)
984	Argentina	92	73	+19	Rudy Fernández	23	2016 Olympics 1R	2016.08.15	Rio (BRA)
983	Lithuania	109	59	+50	Pau Gasol	23	2016 Olympics 1R	2016.08.13	Rio (BRA)
982	Nigeria	96	87	+9	Pau Gasol	16	2016 Olympics 1R	2016.08.11	Rio (BRA)
981	Brazil	65	66	-1	Pau Gasol	13	2016 Olympics 1R	2016.08.09	Rio (BRA)
980	Croatia	70	72	-2	Pau Gasol	26	2016 Olympics 1R	2016.08.07	Rio (BRA)
979	Ivory Coast	100	61	+39			2016 Friendly	2016.07.28	Zaragoza
978	Venezuela	91	55	+36			2016 Friendly	2016.07.25	Valladolid
977	Venezuela	80	65	+15			2016 Friendly	2016.07.23	Madrid
976	Lithuania	76	78	-2			2016 Friendly	2016.07.21	Málaga
975	Lithuania	83	87	-4			2016 Friendly	2016.07.18	Kaunas (LTU)
974	Angola	85	61	+24			2016 Friendly	2016.07.12	Burgos
973	Lithuania	80	63	+17	Pau Gasol	25	2015 EuroBasket F	2015.09.20	Lille (FRA)
972	France	80	75	+5	Pau Gasol	40	2015 EuroBasket SF	2015.09.17	Lille (FRA)
971	Greece	73	71	+2	Pau Gasol	27	2015 EuroBasket QF	2015.09.15	Lille (FRA)
970	Poland	80	66	+14	Pau Gasol	30	2015 EuroBasket R16	2015.09.12	Lille (FRA)
969	Germany	77	76	+1	Sergio Rodríguez	19	2015 EuroBasket 1R	2015.09.10	Berlin (GER)
968	Iceland	99	73	+26	Nikola Mirotić	22	2015 EuroBasket 1R	2015.09.09	Berlin (GER)
967	Italy	98	105	-7	Pau Gasol	34	2015 EuroBasket 1R	2015.09.08	Berlin (GER)
966	Turkey	104	77	+27	Pau Gasol	21	2015 EuroBasket 1R	2015.09.06	Berlin (GER)
965	Serbia	70	80	-10	Pau Gasol	16	2015 EuroBasket 1R	2015.09.05	Berlin (GER)
964	Czech Republic	81	68	+13			2015 Friendly	2015.08.30	Zaragoza
963	North Macedonia	88	54	+34			2015 Friendly	2015.08.25	Logroño
962	North Macedonia	94	63	+31			2015 Friendly	2015.08.22	Madrid
961	Venezuela	82	80	+2			2015 Friendly	2015.08.18	Burgos
960	Senegal	96	49	+47			2015 Friendly	2015.08.16	Santander
959	Poland	71	64	+7			2015 Friendly	2015.08.15	Santander
958	Belgium	67	64	+3			2015 Friendly	2015.08.11	Gijón
957	France	52	65	-13	Pau Gasol	17	2014 World Cup QF	2014.09.10	Madrid
956	Senegal	89	56	+33	Pau Gasol	17	2014 World Cup R16	2014.09.06	Madrid
955	Serbia	89	73	+16	Pau Gasol	20	2014 World Cup 1R	2014.09.04	Granada
954	France	88	64	+24	Marc Gasol	17	2014 World Cup 1R	2014.09.03	Granada
953	Brazil	82	63	+19	Pau Gasol	26	2014 World Cup 1R	2014.09.01	Granada
952	Egypt	91	54	+37	Serge Ibaka	18	2014 World Cup 1R	2014.08.31	Granada
951	Iran	90	60	+30	Pau Gasol	33	2014 World Cup 1R	2014.08.30	Granada
950	Argentina	86	53	+33			2014 Friendly	2014.08.25	Madrid
949	Ukraine	71	63	+8			2014 Friendly	2014.08.21	Badalona
948	Croatia	82	64	+18			2014 Friendly	2014.08.20	Badalona
947	Senegal	88	49	+39			2014 Friendly	2014.08.17	Las Palmas
946	Turkey	70	63	+7			2014 Friendly	2014.08.14	Istanbul (TUR)
945	Turkey	77	55	+22			2014 Friendly	2014.08.12	Granada
944	Angola	79	70	+9			2014 Friendly	2014.08.10	Seville
943	Canada	82	70	+12			2014 Friendly	2014.08.06	A Coruña
942	Croatia	92	66	+26	Sergio Llull	21	2013 EuroBasket 3P	2013.09.22	Ljubljana (SLO)
941	France	72	75	-3	Marc Gasol	19	2013 EuroBasket SF	2013.09.20	Ljubljana (SLO)
940	Serbia	90	60	+30	Sergio Rodríguez	22	2013 EuroBasket QF	2013.09.18	Ljubljana (SLO)
939	Italy	81	86	-5	Marc Gasol	32	2013 EuroBasket 2R	2013.09.16	Ljubljana (SLO)
938	Finland	82	56	+26	José Calderón	23	2013 EuroBasket 2R	2013.09.14	Ljubljana (SLO)
937	Greece	75	79	-4	Marc Gasol, Rudy Fernández	20	2013 EuroBasket 2R	2013.09.12	Ljubljana (SLO)
936	Georgia	83	59	+24	Ricky Rubio	16	2013 EuroBasket 1R	2013.09.09	Celje (SLO)
935	Poland	89	53	+36	Marc Gasol, Ricky Rubio	15	2013 EuroBasket 1R	2013.09.08	Celje (SLO)
934	Czech Republic	60	39	+21	Rudy Fernández	14	2013 EuroBasket 1R	2013.09.07	Celje (SLO)
933	Slovenia	69	78	-9	Marc Gasol	17	2013 EuroBasket 1R	2013.09.05	Celje (SLO)
932	Croatia	68	40	+28	Rudy Fernández	15	2013 EuroBasket 1R	2013.09.04	Celje (SLO)
931	Great Britain	100	46	+54			2013 Friendly	2013.08.29	Zaragoza
930	Great Britain	80	67	+13			2013 Friendly	2013.08.28	Murcia
929	France	85	84	+1			2013 Friendly	2013.08.26	Montpellier (FRA)
928	France	85	76	+9			2013 Friendly	2013.08.23	Madrid
927	North Macedonia	77	55	+22			2013 Friendly	2013.08.21	León
926	North Macedonia	66	61	+5			2013 Friendly	2013.08.20	Santiago de Compostela
925	Germany	85	54	+31			2013 Friendly	2013.08.17	A Coruña
924	Poland	70	66	+4			2013 Friendly	2013.08.13	Castellón
923	United States	100	107	-7	Pau Gasol	24	2012 Olympics F	2012.08.12	London (ENG)
922	Russia	67	59	+8	Pau Gasol	16	2012 Olympics SF	2012.08.10	London (ENG)
921	France	66	59	+7	Marc Gasol	14	2012 Olympics QF	2012.08.08	London (ENG)
920	Brazil	82	88	-6	Pau Gasol	25	2012 Olympics 1R	2012.08.06	London (ENG)
919	Russia	74	77	-3	Pau Gasol	20	2012 Olympics 1R	2012.08.04	London (ENG)
918	Great Britain	79	78	+1	José Calderón	19	2012 Olympics 1R	2012.08.02	London (ENG)
917	Australia	82	70	+12	Pau Gasol	20	2012 Olympics 1R	2012.07.31	London (ENG)
916	China	97	81	+16	Pau Gasol	21	2012 Olympics 1R	2012.07.29	London (ENG)
915	United States	78	100	-22			2012 Friendly	2012.07.24	Barcelona
914	Argentina	105	85	+20			2012 Friendly	2012.07.20	A Coruña
913	Australia	81	75	+6			2012 Friendly	2012.07.18	Málaga
912	Australia	75	69	+6			2012 Friendly	2012.07.17	Granada
911	France	75	70	+5			2012 Friendly	2012.07.15	Paris (FRA)
910	Tunisia	95	56	+39			2012 Friendly	2012.07.13	Salamanca
909	France	81	65	+16			2012 Friendly	2012.07.10	Madrid
908	Great Britain	78	74	+4			2012 Friendly	2012.07.09	Valladolid
907	France	98	85	+13	J.C. Navarro	27	2011 EuroBasket F	2011.09.18	Kaunas (LTU)
906	North Macedonia	92	80	+12	J.C. Navarro	35	2011 EuroBasket SF	2011.09.16	Kaunas (LTU)
905	Slovenia	86	64	+22	J.C. Navarro	26	2011 EuroBasket QF	2011.09.14	Kaunas (LTU)
904	France	96	69	+27	J.C. Navarro	16	2011 EuroBasket 2R	2011.09.11	Vilnius (LTU)
903	Serbia	81	59	+22	Pau Gasol	26	2011 EuroBasket 2R	2011.09.09	Vilnius (LTU)
902	Germany	77	68	+9	Marc Gasol	24	2011 EuroBasket 2R	2011.09.07	Vilnius (LTU)
901	Turkey	57	65	-8	Marc Gasol	12	2011 EuroBasket 1R	2011.09.05	Panevėžys (LTU)
900	Lithuania	91	79	+12	J.C. Navarro	22	2011 EuroBasket 1R	2011.09.04	Panevėžys (LTU)
899	Great Britain	86	69	+17	Pau Gasol	21	2011 EuroBasket 1R	2011.09.02	Panevėžys (LTU)
898	Portugal	87	73	+14	Pau Gasol	20	2011 EuroBasket 1R	2011.09.01	Panevėžys (LTU)
897	Poland	83	78	+5	Pau Gasol	29	2011 EuroBasket 1R	2011.08.31	Panevėžys (LTU)
896	Australia	97	58	+39			2011 Friendly	2011.08.26	Valencia
895	Australia	68	51	+17			2011 Friendly	2011.08.25	Murcia
894	Slovenia	79	57	+22			2011 Friendly	2011.08.21	Granada
893	Slovenia	73	61	+12			2011 Friendly	2011.08.20	Málaga
892	Lithuania	76	88	-12			2011 Friendly	2011.08.18	Kaunas (LTU)
891	Bulgaria	96	59	+37			2011 Friendly	2011.08.15	Guadalajara
890	Lithuania	90	78	+12			2011 Friendly	2011.08.13	Madrid
889	France	76	53	+23			2011 Friendly	2011.08.09	Almeria
888	Argentina	81	86	-5	Rudy Fernández	31	2010 World Cup CR	2010.09.12	Istanbul (TUR)
887	Slovenia	97	80	+17	J.C. Navarro	26	2010 World Cup CR	2010.09.10	Istanbul (TUR)
886	Serbia	89	92	-3	J.C. Navarro	27	2010 World Cup QF	2010.09.08	Istanbul (TUR)
885	Greece	80	72	+8	J.C. Navarro	22	2010 World Cup R16	2010.09.04	Istanbul (TUR)
884	Canada	89	67	+22	F.Vázquez, R.Fernández	19	2010 World Cup 1R	2010.09.02	Ismir (TUR)
883	Lebanon	91	57	+34	Marc Gasol	25	2010 World Cup 1R	2010.09.01	Ismir (TUR)
882	Lithuania	73	76	-3	Marc Gasol, J.C. Navarro	18	2010 World Cup 1R	2010.08.31	Ismir (TUR)
881	New Zealand	101	84	+17	Marc Gasol	22	2010 World Cup 1R	2010.08.29	Ismir (TUR)
880	France	66	72	-6	J.C. Navarro	17	2010 World Cup 1R	2010.08.28	Ismir (TUR)
879	United States	85	86	-1			2010 Friendly	2010.08.22	Madrid
878	Lithuania	94	75	+19			2010 Friendly	2010.08.20	Madrid
877	Brazil	84	68	+16			2010 Friendly	2010.08.17	Logroño
876	Argentina	83	76	+7			2010 Friendly	2010.08.15	Logroño
875	Slovenia	79	72	+7			2010 Friendly	2010.08.10	Ljubljana (SLO)
874	Slovenia	88	68	+20			2010 Friendly	2010.08.08	Vitoria
873	Lithuania	97	76	+21			2010 Friendly	2010.08.07	Vitoria
872	Ivory Coast	85	70	+15			2010 Friendly	2010.08.02	Las Palmas
871	Canada	84	38	+46			2010 Friendly	2010.08.01	Las Palmas
870	Serbia	85	63	+22	Pau Gasol	18	2009 EuroBasket F	2009.09.20	Katowice (POL)
869	Greece	82	64	+18	Pau Gasol	18	2009 EuroBasket SF	2009.09.19	Katowice (POL)
868	France	86	66	+20	Pau Gasol	28	2009 EuroBasket QF	2009.09.17	Katowice (POL)
867	Poland	90	68	+22	J.C. Navarro	23	2009 EuroBasket 2R	2009.09.16	Lodz (POL)
866	Lithuania	84	70	+14	Pau Gasol	19	2009 EuroBasket 2R	2009.09.14	Lodz (POL)
865	Turkey	60	63	-3	Rudy Fernández, Pau Gasol	16	2009 EuroBasket 2R	2009.09.12	Lodz (POL)
864	Slovenia	90	84	+6	J.C. Navarro	21	2009 EuroBasket 1R	2009.09.09	Warsaw (POL)
863	Great Britain	84	76	+8	Pau Gasol	27	2009 EuroBasket 1R	2009.09.08	Warsaw (POL)
862	Serbia	57	66	-9	J.C. Navarro	14	2009 EuroBasket 1R	2009.09.07	Warsaw (POL)
861	Lithuania	72	94	-22			2009 Friendly	2009.09.03	Vilnius (LTU)
860	Israel	93	56	+37			2009 Friendly	2009.08.30	Murcia
859	Poland	88	83	+5			2009 Friendly	2009.08.27	Zaragoza
858	Israel	102	79	+23			2009 Friendly	2009.08.26	Zaragoza
857	Lithuania	100	74	+26			2009 Friendly	2009.08.21	Seville
856	Slovenia	89	71	+18			2009 Friendly	2009.08.20	Seville
855	Great Britain	84	63	+21			2009 Friendly	2009.08.19	Seville
854	Cuba	94	57	+37			2009 Friendly	2009.08.14	Las Palmas
853	United States	107	118	-11	Rudy Fernández	22	2008 Olympics F	2008.08.24	Beijing (CHN)
852	Lithuania	91	86	+5	Pau Gasol	19	2008 Olympics SF	2008.08.22	Beijing (CHN)
851	Croatia	72	59	+13	Pau Gasol	20	2008 Olympics QF	2008.08.20	Beijing (CHN)
850	Angola	98	50	+48	Pau Gasol	31	2008 Olympics 1R	2008.08.18	Beijing (CHN)
849	United States	82	119	-37	Felipe Reyes	19	2008 Olympics 1R	2008.08.16	Beijing (CHN)
848	Germany	72	59	+13	José Calderón	15	2008 Olympics 1R	2008.08.14	Beijing (CHN)
847	China	85	75	+10	Pau Gasol	29	2008 Olympics 1R	2008.08.12	Beijing (CHN)
846	Greece	81	66	+15	Rudy Fernández	16	2008 Olympics 1R	2008.08.10	Beijing (CHN)
845	Latvia	107	57	+50			2008 Friendly	2008.07.30	Castellón
844	Hungary	103	45	+58			2008 Friendly	2008.07.28	Zaragoza
843	Argentina	87	62	+25			2008 Friendly	2008.07.26	Ourense
842	Lithuania	91	66	+25			2008 Friendly	2008.07.24	Ourense
841	Argentina	90	88	+2			2008 Friendly	2008.07.22	Madrid
840	Russia	91	56	+35			2008 Friendly	2008.07.20	Cáceres
839	Portugal	84	35	+49			2008 Friendly	2008.07.18	Badajoz
838	Russia	59	60	-1	José Calderón	15	2007 EuroBasket F	2007.09.16	Madrid
837	Greece	82	77	+5	J.C. Navarro, Pau Gasol	23	2007 EuroBasket SF	2007.09.15	Madrid
836	Germany	83	55	+28	José Calderón	17	2007 EuroBasket QF	2007.09.13	Madrid
835	Israel	99	73	+26	Pau Gasol	26	2007 EuroBasket 2R	2007.09.11	Madrid
834	Russia	81	69	+12	José Calderón	17	2007 EuroBasket 2R	2007.09.09	Madrid
833	Greece	76	58	+18	Rudy Fernández	20	2007 EuroBasket 2R	2007.09.07	Madrid
832	Croatia	84	85	-1	Pau Gasol	26	2007 EuroBasket 1R	2007.09.05	Seville
831	Latvia	93	77	+16	Pau Gasol	26	2007 EuroBasket 1R	2007.09.04	Seville
830	Portugal	82	56	+26	Pau Gasol	19	2007 EuroBasket 1R	2007.09.03	Seville
829	France	87	72	+15			2007 Friendly	2007.08.29	Alicante
828	Germany	72	56	+16			2007 Friendly	2007.08.28	Palma de Mallorca
827	Germany	77	61	+16			2007 Friendly	2007.08.22	Valencia
826	Czech Republic	79	55	+24			2007 Friendly	2007.08.21	Castellón
825	Lithuania	97	74	+23			2007 Friendly	2007.08.18	Ourense
824	Lithuania	95	75	+20			2007 Friendly	2007.08.16	Gijón
823	Portugal	82	65	+17			2007 Friendly	2007.08.14	Logroño
822	Venezuela	93	69	+24			2007 Friendly	2007.08.08	Jerez de La Frontera
821	Greece	70	47	+23	Jorge Garbajosa, J.C. Navarro	20	2006 World Cup F	2006.09.03	Saitama (JPN)
820	Argentina	75	74	+1	Jorge Garbajosa, Pau Gasol	19	2006 World Cup SF	2006.09.01	Saitama (JPN)
819	Lithuania	89	67	+22	Pau Gasol	25	2006 World Cup QF	2006.08.29	Saitama (JPN)
818	Serbia	87	75	+12	Pau Gasol	19	2006 World Cup R16	2006.08.26	Saitama (JPN)
817	Japan	104	55	+49	Pau Gasol	21	2006 World Cup 1R	2006.08.24	Hiroshima (JPN)
816	Angola	93	83	+10	Pau Gasol	28	2006 World Cup 1R	2006.08.23	Hiroshima (JPN)
815	Germany	92	71	+21	José Calderón	20	2006 World Cup 1R	2006.08.21	Hiroshima (JPN)
814	Panama	101	57	+44	Pau Gasol	26	2006 World Cup 1R	2006.08.20	Hiroshima (JPN)
813	New Zealand	86	70	+16	Garbajosa, P.Gasol, Navarro	16	2006 World Cup 1R	2006.08.19	Hiroshima (JPN)
812	Argentina	87	66	+21			2006 Friendly	2006.08.13	Singapore (SIN)
811	Serbia	80	65	+15			2006 Friendly	2006.08.12	Singapore (SIN)
810	Slovenia	96	85	+11			2006 Friendly	2006.08.11	Singapore (SIN)
809	Argentina	79	67	+12			2006 Friendly	2006.08.06	Madrid
808	Poland	89	57	+32			2006 Friendly	2006.08.05	Madrid
807	Serbia	83	62	+21			2006 Friendly	2006.07.31	Alicante
806	Angola	97	73	+24			2006 Friendly	2006.07.30	Valencia
805	China	97	63	+34			2006 Friendly	2006.07.29	Castellón
804	China	96	49	+47			2006 Friendly	2006.07.26	Córdoba
803	France	68	98	-30	J.C. Navarro	17	2005 EuroBasket 3P	2005.09.25	Novi Sad (SRB)
802	Germany	73	74	-1	J.C. Navarro	27	2005 EuroBasket SF	2005.09.24	Novi Sad (SRB)
801	Croatia	101	85	+16	J.C. Navarro	36	2005 EuroBasket QF	2005.09.23	Novi Sad (SRB)
800	Israel	77	85	-8	Jorge Garbajosa	21	2005 EuroBasket 1R	2005.09.18	Novi Sad (SRB)
799	Latvia	114	109	+5	J.C. Navarro	35	2005 EuroBasket 1R	2005.09.17	Novi Sad (SRB)
798	Serbia and Montenegro	89	70	+19	J.C. Navarro	27	2005 EuroBasket 1R	2005.09.16	Novi Sad (SRB)
797	Greece	80	88	-8			2005 Friendly	2005.09.10	Madrid
796	Croatia	89	82	+7			2005 Friendly	2005.09.08	Granada
795	Croatia	98	99	-1			2005 Friendly	2005.09.06	Córdoba
794	Germany	75	68	+7			2005 Friendly	2005.09.03	Valencia
793	Ukraine	82	49	+33			2005 Friendly	2005.09.02	Castellón
792	France	94	88	+6			2005 Friendly	2005.08.28	Alicante
791	France	95	84	+11			2005 Friendly	2005.08.27	Calpe
790	China	92	76	+16	Pau Gasol	37	2004 Olympics CR	2004.08.28	Athens (GRE)
789	United States	94	102	-8	Pau Gasol	29	2004 Olympics QF	2004.08.26	Athens (GRE)
788	New Zealand	88	84	+4	Jorge Garbajosa	17	2004 Olympics 1R	2004.08.23	Athens (GRE)
787	Serbia and Montenegro	76	68	+8	José Calderón	15	2004 Olympics 1R	2004.08.21	Athens (GRE)
786	Italy	71	63	+8	Jorge Garbajosa	17	2004 Olympics 1R	2004.08.19	Athens (GRE)
785	Argentina	87	76	+11	Pau Gasol	26	2004 Olympics 1R	2004.08.17	Athens (GRE)
784	China	83	58	+25	Pau Gasol	21	2004 Olympics 1R	2004.08.15	Athens (GRE)
783	Argentina	98	90	+8			2004 Friendly	2004.08.07	Madrid
782	Greece	80	70	+10			2004 Friendly	2004.08.06	Madrid
781	Puerto Rico	113	62	+51			2004 Friendly	2004.08.04	Alicante
780	Brazil	92	57	+35			2004 Friendly	2004.08.02	Alicante
779	Serbia and Montenegro	76	60	+16			2004 Friendly	2004.07.27	Granada
778	Serbia and Montenegro	83	78	+5			2004 Friendly	2004.07.24	Palma de Mallorca
777	Croatia	97	70	+27			2004 Friendly	2004.07.23	Palma de Mallorca
776	Lithuania	84	93	-9	Pau Gasol	36	2003 EuroBasket F	2003.09.14	Södertälje (SWE)
775	Italy	81	79	+2	J.C. Navarro	23	2003 EuroBasket SF	2003.09.13	Södertälje (SWE)
774	Israel	78	64	+14	Pau Gasol	25	2003 EuroBasket QF	2003.09.11	Södertälje (SWE)
773	Serbia and Montenegro	75	67	+8	J.C. Navarro	22	2003 EuroBasket 1R	2003.09.07	Södertälje (SWE)
772	Russia	89	77	+12	Pau Gasol	35	2003 EuroBasket 1R	2003.09.06	Södertälje (SWE)
771	Sweden	99	52	+47	Pau Gasol	24	2003 EuroBasket 1R	2003.09.05	Södertälje (SWE)
770	Latvia	89	73	+16			2003 Friendly	2003.08.29	El Ejido
769	Poland	91	56	+35			2003 Friendly	2003.08.28	El Ejido
768	Lithuania	70	88	-18			2003 Friendly	2003.08.26	Torrevieja
767	Ukraine	95	56	+39			2003 Friendly	2003.08.25	Torrevieja
766	Lithuania	97	81	+16			2003 Friendly	2003.08.22	Salamanca
765	Greece	87	76	+11			2003 Friendly	2003.08.16	San Fernando
764	Japan	91	38	+53			2003 Friendly	2003.08.15	Huelva
763	Greece	94	91	+3	J.C. Navarro	30	2003 EuroBasket qualification	2003.01.25	León
762	Belgium	85	66	+19	Felipe Reyes	24	2003 EuroBasket qualification	2003.01.22	Murcia
761	Israel	79	71	+8	José Antonio Paraíso	22	2003 EuroBasket qualification	2002.11.27	Tel Aviv (ISR)
760	Denmark	87	46	+41	Hernández-Sonseca	17	2003 EuroBasket qualification	2002.11.23	Arganda
759	Romania	96	70	+26	J.C. Navarro	19	2003 EuroBasket qualification	2002.11.20	Cluj Napoca (ROU)
758	United States	81	75	+6	J.C. Navarro	26	2002 World Cup CR	2002.09.07	Indianapolis (USA)
757	Brazil	105	89	+16	J.C. Navarro	22	2002 World Cup CR	2002.09.06	Indianapolis (USA)
756	Germany	62	70	-8	J.C. Navarro	21	2002 World Cup QF	2002.09.05	Indianapolis (USA)
755	Brazil	84	67	+17	Pau Gasol	23	2002 World Cup 2R	2002.09.04	Indianapolis (USA)
754	Puerto Rico	65	73	-8	Pau Gasol	16	2002 World Cup 2R	2002.09.03	Indianapolis (USA)
753	Turkey	87	64	+23	Pau Gasol	19	2002 World Cup 2R	2002.09.02	Indianapolis (USA)
752	Angola	88	55	+33	Felipe Reyes	19	2002 World Cup 1R	2002.08.31	Indianapolis (USA)
751	Yugoslavia	71	69	+2	Pau Gasol	25	2002 World Cup 1R	2002.08.30	Indianapolis (USA)
750	Canada	85	54	+31	Pau Gasol	19	2002 World Cup 1R	2002.08.29	Indianapolis (USA)
749	Australia	83	89	-6			2002 Friendly	2002.08.21	Torrelavega
748	Croatia	76	63	+13			2002 Friendly	2002.08.20	Torrelavega
747	Russia	78	61	+17			2002 Friendly	2002.08.17	Estepona
746	Australia	91	71	+20			2002 Friendly	2002.08.16	Estepona
745	Russia	87	80	+7			2002 Friendly	2002.08.14	Málaga
744	Greece	73	86	-13	Jorge Garbajosa	18	2003 EuroBasket qualification	2002.01.26	Athens (GRE)
743	Belgium	78	63	+15	Jorge Garbajosa	18	2003 EuroBasket qualification	2002.01.23	Liège (BEL)
742	Israel	88	74	+14	Jorge Garbajosa	20	2003 EuroBasket qualification	2001.11.28	Madrid
741	Denmark	96	66	+30	J.C. Navarro	20	2003 EuroBasket qualification	2001.11.24	Copenhague (DEN)
740	Romania	90	52	+38	A.Reyes, J.Garbajosa	17	2003 EuroBasket qualification	2001.11.21	Arganda
739	Germany	99	90	+9	Pau Gasol	31	2001 EuroBasket 3P	2001.09.09	Istanbul (TUR)
738	Yugoslavia	65	78	-13	Pau Gasol	22	2001 EuroBasket SF	2001.09.08	Istanbul (TUR)
737	Russia	62	55	+7	Alfonso Reyes	13	2001 EuroBasket QF	2001.09.06	Istanbul (TUR)
736	Israel	71	67	+4	Alfonso Reyes	16	2001 EuroBasket 2R	2001.09.03	Ankara (TUR)
735	Turkey	79	84	-5	J.C. Navarro	24	2001 EuroBasket 1R	2001.09.02	Ankara (TUR)
734	Latvia	106	77	+29	José Antonio Paraíso	16	2001 EuroBasket 1R	2001.09.01	Ankara (TUR)
733	Slovenia	85	61	+24	José Antonio Paraíso	17	2001 EuroBasket 1R	2001.08.31	Ankara (TUR)
732	Croatia	73	75	-2			2001 Friendly	2001.08.23	Chiclana
731	Russia	56	73	-17			2001 Friendly	2001.08.21	Chiclana
730	France	98	91	+7			2001 Friendly	2001.08.19	Chiclana
729	Israel	81	72	+9			2001 Friendly	2001.08.17	Chiclana
728	Greece	84	79	+5			2001 Friendly	2001.08.15	Chiclana
727	China	84	64	+20	J.C. Navarro	19	2000 Olympics CR	2000.09.26	Sydney (AUS)
726	Australia	80	91	-11	Alberto Herreros	24	2000 Olympics 1R	2000.09.25	Sydney (AUS)
725	Yugoslavia	65	78	-13	Alberto Herreros	16	2000 Olympics 1R	2000.09.23	Sydney (AUS)
724	Canada	77	91	-14	Johnny Rogers	15	2000 Olympics 1R	2000.09.21	Sydney (AUS)
723	Russia	63	71	-8	Alberto Herreros	13	2000 Olympics 1R	2000.09.19	Sydney (AUS)
722	Angola	64	45	+19	Roberto Dueñas	13	2000 Olympics 1R	2000.09.17	Sydney (AUS)
721	Italy	63	67	-4			2000 Friendly	2000.09.10	Perth (AUS)
720	France	82	67	+15			2000 Friendly	2000.09.08	Perth (AUS)
719	United States	66	95	-29			2000 Friendly	2000.09.05	Tokyo (JPN)
718	Japan	99	58	+41			2000 Friendly	2000.09.03	Tokyo (JPN)
717	Lithuania	89	91	-2			2000 Friendly	2000.08.26	Valladolid
716	Greece	76	70	+6			2000 Friendly	2000.08.25	Valladolid
715	Turkey	66	65	+1			2000 Friendly	2000.08.23	Huelva
714	Croatia	104	80	+24			2000 Friendly	2000.08.22	Huelva
713	France	58	82	-24			2000 Friendly	2000.08.20	Pau (FRA)
712	Lithuania	72	87	-15			2000 Friendly	2000.08.18	Granada
711	Italy	56	64	-8	Iván Corrales	15	1999 EuroBasket F	1999.07.03	Paris (FRA)
710	France	70	63	+7	Alberto Herreros	29	1999 EuroBasket SF	1999.07.02	Paris (FRA)
709	Lithuania	74	72	+2	Alberto Herreros	28	1999 EuroBasket QF	1999.07.01	Paris (FRA)
708	Israel	88	74	+14	Alfonso Reyes	19	1999 EuroBasket 2R	1999.06.28	Pau (FRA)
707	Yugoslavia	63	77	-14	Alfonso Reyes	18	1999 EuroBasket 2R	1999.06.27	Pau (FRA)
706	France	57	74	-17	Roberto Dueñas	15	1999 EuroBasket 2R	1999.06.26	Pau (FRA)
705	Russia	72	69	+3	Alberto Herreros	20	1999 EuroBasket 1R	1999.06.23	Clermont-Ferrand (FRA)
704	Slovenia	75	85	-10	Alberto Herreros	29	1999 EuroBasket 1R	1999.06.22	Clermont-Ferrand (FRA)
703	Hungary	84	75	+9	Alberto Herreros	25	1999 EuroBasket 1R	1999.06.21	Clermont-Ferrand (FRA)
702	North Macedonia	74	66	+8			1999 Friendly	1999.06.17	Fuenlabrada
701	Lithuania	70	81	-11			1999 Friendly	1999.06.13	A Coruña
700	Lithuania	87	84	+3			1999 Friendly	1999.06.10	Gijón
699	Hungary	90	75	+15			1999 Friendly	1999.06.08	Gijón
698	Croatia	76	80	-4			1999 Friendly	1999.06.05	Huelva
697	Greece	60	65	-5			1999 Friendly	1999.06.04	Huelva
696	France	91	81	+10	Alberto Angulo	17	1999 Friendly	1999.06.02	Torrelavega
695	Denmark	80	63	+17	Alfonso Reyes	12	1999 EuroBasket qualification	1999.02.27	Vejle (DEN)
694	Israel	71	63	+8	Roberto Dueñas	16	1999 EuroBasket qualification	1999.02.24	Torrejon de Ardoz
693	Belarus	93	79	+14	Iván Corrales	19	1999 EuroBasket qualification	1998.12.02	Minsk (BIE)
692	England	74	58	+16	Alberto Herreros	20	1999 EuroBasket qualification	1998.11.28	León
691	Ukraine	80	51	+29	Alfonso Reyes	20	1999 EuroBasket qualification	1998.11.25	León
690	Italy	64	61	+3	Alberto Herreros	17	1998 World Cup CR	1998.08.09	Athens (GRE)
689	Argentina	77	64	+13	Juan Antonio Orenga	22	1998 World Cup CR	1998.08.08	Athens (GRE)
688	Greece	62	69	-7	Nacho Rodríguez	12	1998 World Cup QF	1998.08.07	Athens (GRE)
687	Lithuania	86	80	+6	Alberto Herreros	27	1998 World Cup 2R	1998.08.04	Athens (GRE)
686	United States	73	75	-2	Alberto Herreros	27	1998 World Cup 2R	1998.08.03	Athens (GRE)
685	Brazil	73	63	+10	N.Rodríguez, A.Angulo	17	1998 World Cup 2R	1998.08.02	Athens (GRE)
684	Argentina	68	67	+1	Alberto Herreros	21	1998 World Cup 1R	1998.07.31	Athens (GRE)
683	Australia	77	76	+1	Alberto Herreros	24	1998 World Cup 1R	1998.07.30	Athens (GRE)
682	Nigeria	80	68	+12	Nacho Rodilla, Alfonso Reyes	14	1998 World Cup 1R	1998.07.29	Athens (GRE)
681	Yugoslavia	79	81	-2			1998 Friendly	1998.07.24	Fuenlabrada
680	Yugoslavia	68	66	+2			1998 Friendly	1998.07.23	San Fernando
679	Ukraine	80	60	+20			1998 Friendly	1998.07.22	San Fernando
678	France	78	83	-5			1998 Friendly	1998.07.20	Antibes (FRA)
677	United States	78	95	-17			1998 Friendly	1998.07.19	Monaco (MON)
676	Lithuania	66	62	+4			1998 Friendly	1998.07.16	La Rinconada
675	France	73	63	+10			1998 Friendly	1998.07.15	La Rinconada
674	Lithuania	79	84	-5			1998 Friendly	1998.07.13	Valencia
673	Denmark	86	57	+29	Alberto Angulo	15	1999 EuroBasket qualification	1998.02.28	Torrelavega
672	Israel	67	61	+6	Alberto Angulo	15	1999 EuroBasket qualification	1998.02.25	Tel Aviv (ISR)
671	Belarus	101	53	+48	A.Herreros, J.A.Paraíso	19	1999 EuroBasket qualification	1997.12.03	Alcoy
670	England	92	67	+25	Alberto Herreros	21	1999 EuroBasket qualification	1997.11.29	Plymouth (ENG)
669	Ukraine	83	66	+17	José Antonio Paraíso	22	1999 EuroBasket qualification	1997.11.26	Kyiv (UKR)
668	Lithuania	94	93	+1	Alberto Herreros	20	1997 EuroBasket CR	1997.07.06	Barcelona
667	Turkey	86	81	+5	Alberto Herreros	18	1997 EuroBasket CR	1997.07.05	Barcelona
666	Russia	67	70	-3	Juan Antonio Orenga	17	1997 EuroBasket QF	1997.07.04	Barcelona
665	Yugoslavia	70	79	-9	Alfonso Reyes	20	1997 EuroBasket 2R	1997.07.01	Badalona
664	Poland	104	61	+43	A.Angulo, A.Reyes	21	1997 EuroBasket 2R	1997.06.30	Badalona
663	Italy	60	63	-3	Alberto Herreros	15	1997 EuroBasket 2R	1997.06.29	Badalona
662	Germany	67	59	+8	Tomás Jofresa	14	1997 EuroBasket 1R	1997.06.27	Badalona
661	Croatia	78	71	+7	Mike Smith	24	1997 EuroBasket 1R	1997.06.26	Badalona
660	Ukraine	82	54	+28	Ferrán Martínez	16	1997 EuroBasket 1R	1997.06.25	Badalona
659	Lithuania	89	73	+16			1997 Friendly	1997.06.20	Segovia
658	Lithuania	82	99	-17			1997 Friendly	1997.06.19	Zaragoza
657	Bosnia and Herzegovina	56	59	-3			1997 Friendly	1997.06.18	Zaragoza
656	Russia	73	85	-12			1997 Friendly	1997.06.16	Melilla
655	Israel	82	72	+10			1997 Friendly	1997.06.15	Melilla
654	Italy	68	67	+1			1997 Friendly	1997.05.19	Alcoy
653	Italy	84	68	+16			1997 Friendly	1997.05.18	Elda
652	Croatia	66	72	-6			1996 Friendly	1996.06.25	Estella
651	Croatia	91	80	+11			1996 Friendly	1996.06.21	León
650	Angola	78	53	+25			1996 Friendly	1996.06.20	León
649	Yugoslavia	71	103	-32			1996 Friendly	1996.06.18	Belgrade (SRB)
648	Italy	89	95	-6			1996 Friendly	1996.06.16	Roseto (ITA)
647	Turkey	90	69	+21			1996 Friendly	1996.06.14	Roseto (ITA)
646	England	91	70	+21			1995 Friendly	1995.11.13	Huesca
645	Italy	75	82	-7	Alberto Herreros	22	1995 EuroBasket CR	1995.07.02	Athens (GRE)
644	France	75	74	+1	Xavi Fernández	19	1995 EuroBasket CR	1995.07.01	Athens (GRE)
643	Greece	64	66	-2	Alberto Herreros	15	1995 EuroBasket QF	1995.06.30	Athens (GRE)
642	Russia	94	78	+16	Ferrán Martínez	27	1995 EuroBasket 1R	1995.06.27	Athens (GRE)
641	Slovenia	88	85	+3	Alberto Herreros	30	1995 EuroBasket 1R	1995.06.26	Athens (GRE)
640	Croatia	70	80	-10	Alberto Herreros	19	1995 EuroBasket 1R	1995.06.24	Athens (GRE)
639	France	75	86	-11	José Luis Galilea	15	1995 EuroBasket 1R	1995.06.23	Athens (GRE)
638	Finland	87	74	+13	Xavi Fernández	17	1995 EuroBasket 1R	1995.06.22	Athens (GRE)
637	Turkey	85	70	+15	Alberto Herreros	28	1995 EuroBasket 1R	1995.06.21	Athens (GRE)
636	Yugoslavia	68	87	-19			1995 Friendly	1995.06.16	Fuenlabrada
635	Croatia	68	78	-10			1995 Friendly	1995.06.15	A Coruña
634	Israel	79	71	+8			1995 Friendly	1995.06.13	A Coruña
633	Lithuania	77	83	-6			1995 Friendly	1995.06.11	Málaga
632	Italy	75	70	+5			1995 Friendly	1995.06.10	Málaga
631	Italy	84	82	+2			1995 Friendly	1995.05.21	Guadalajara
630	Italy	76	72	+4			1995 Friendly	1995.05.20	Leganés
629	Israel	78	83	-5	Ferrán Martínez	25	1995 EuroBasket qualification	1994.11.16	Huesca
628	Turkey	89	85	+4	Ferrán Martínez	21	1995 EuroBasket qualification	1994.11.12	Istanbul (TUR)
627	Czech Republic	80	78	+2	Javier Fernández	16	1995 EuroBasket qualification	1994.11.09	Novy Jicin (CZE)
626	Argentina	65	74	-9	Ferrán Martínez	17	1994 World Cup CR	1994.08.13	Hamilton (CAN)
625	Brazil	90	85	+5	Jordi Villacampa	24	1994 World Cup CR	1994.08.12	Hamilton (CAN)
624	Argentina	72	70	+2	Alberto Herreros	17	1994 World Cup CR	1994.08.11	Hamilton (CAN)
623	Egypt	94	52	+42	Jordi Villacampa	19	1994 World Cup CR	1994.08.09	Hamilton (CAN)
622	South Korea	98	57	+41	Rafael Vecina	19	1994 World Cup CR	1994.08.08	Hamilton (CAN)
621	China	76	78	-2	Ferrán Martínez	22	1994 World Cup 1R	1994.08.07	Hamilton (CAN)
620	Brazil	73	67	+6	Alberto Herreros	21	1994 World Cup 1R	1994.08.05	Hamilton (CAN)
619	United States	100	115	-15	Jordi Villacampa	28	1994 World Cup 1R	1994.08.04	Hamilton (CAN)
618	Germany	80	63	+17			1994 Friendly	1994.08.02	Toronto (CAN)
617	Canada	81	92	-11			1994 Friendly	1994.07.30	Hamilton (CAN)
616	Croatia	91	81	+10			1994 Friendly	1994.07.27	Fuenlabrada
615	Argentina	91	84	+7			1994 Friendly	1994.07.20	Córdoba
614	France	68	70	-2			1994 Friendly	1994.07.19	Córdoba
613	Canada	88	102	-14			1994 Friendly	1994.07.15	Castellón
612	Canada	93	79	+14			1994 Friendly	1994.07.14	Lliria
611	Finland	94	75	+19			1994 Friendly	1994.07.12	Lliria
610	Israel	79	69	+10	Rafael Vecina	17	1995 EuroBasket qualification	1993.11.17	Tel Aviv (ISR)
609	Turkey	74	65	+9	Antonio Martín	20	1995 EuroBasket qualification	1993.11.13	Málaga
608	Czech Republic	107	67	+40	Andrés Jiménez	16	1995 EuroBasket qualification	1993.11.10	Málaga
607	Estonia	119	80	+39	J.Villacampa, San Epifanio	18	1993 EuroBasket CR	1993.07.03	Munich (GER)
606	France	95	83	+12	J.Villacampa, A.Martín	24	1993 EuroBasket CR	1993.07.02	Munich (GER)
605	Germany	77	79	-2	Alberto Herreros	19	1993 EuroBasket QF	1993.07.01	Munich (GER)
604	Greece	75	76	-1	Jordi Villacampa	31	1993 EuroBasket 2R	1993.06.28	Karlsruhe (GER)
603	Latvia	95	87	+8	Antonio Martín	21	1993 EuroBasket 2R	1993.06.27	Karlsruhe (GER)
602	Italy	78	60	+18	Antonio Martín	18	1993 EuroBasket 2R	1993.06.26	Karlsruhe (GER)
601	Russia	86	75	+11	J.Villacampa, A.Martín	21	1993 EuroBasket 1R	1993.06.24	Karlsruhe (GER)
600	Bosnia and Herzegovina	96	89	+7	Jordi Villacampa	28	1993 EuroBasket 1R	1993.06.23	Karlsruhe (GER)
599	Sweden	72	49	+23	Jordi Villacampa	17	1993 EuroBasket 1R	1993.06.22	Karlsruhe (GER)
598	Ukraine	83	61	+22			1993 Friendly	1993.06.15	Melilla
597	Ukraine	83	87	-4			1993 Friendly	1993.06.12	Córdoba
596	Turkey	72	50	+22			1993 Friendly	1993.06.11	Córdoba
595	United States	85	83	+2			1993 Friendly	1993.06.08	Castellón
594	Angola	78	75	+3	Andrés Jiménez	15	1992 Olympics CR	1992.08.06	Badalona
593	Venezuela	95	81	+14	Alberto Herreros	25	1992 Olympics CR	1992.08.04	Badalona
592	United States	81	122	-41	Andrés Jiménez	23	1992 Olympics 1R	1992.08.02	Badalona
591	Angola	63	83	-20	A.Jiménez, J.Villacampa	16	1992 Olympics 1R	1992.07.31	Badalona
590	Croatia	79	88	-9	Jordi Villacampa	19	1992 Olympics 1R	1992.07.29	Badalona
589	Brazil	101	100	+1	Jordi Villacampa	25	1992 Olympics 1R	1992.07.27	Badalona
588	Germany	74	83	-9	Jordi Villacampa	21	1992 Olympics 1R	1992.07.26	Badalona
587	Puerto Rico	69	64	+5			1992 Friendly	1992.07.19	Granada
586	Puerto Rico	86	99	-13			1992 Friendly	1992.07.18	Almeria
585	Argentina	75	82	-7			1992 Friendly	1992.06.21	San Juan (PUR)
584	Croatia	82	88	-6			1992 Friendly	1992.06.16	Seville
583	Lithuania	97	107	-10			1992 Friendly	1992.06.15	Ibiza
582	England	94	81	+13			1992 Friendly	1992.06.14	Ibiza
581	Croatia	72	91	-19			1992 Friendly	1992.06.13	Palma de Mallorca
580	Bulgaria	74	68	+6			1992 Friendly	1992.06.12	Palma de Mallorca
579	Croatia	96	109	-13			1992 Friendly	1992.05.29	Trieste (ITA)
578	Italy	70	96	-26			1992 Friendly	1992.05.28	Trieste (ITA)
577	Greece	95	94	+1			1992 Friendly	1992.05.27	Trieste (ITA)
576	Slovenia	89	78	+11			1992 Friendly	1992.05.24	León
575	Mexico	110	68	+42			1992 Friendly	1992.05.23	León
574	Ukraine	103	109	-6			1991 Friendly	1992.05.22	León
573	France	101	83	+18	Antonio Martín	26	1991 EuroBasket 3P	1991.06.29	Rome (ITA)
572	Italy	90	93	-3	San Epifanio	25	1991 EuroBasket SF	1991.06.28	Rome (ITA)
571	Poland	73	67	+6	Antonio Martín	23	1991 EuroBasket 1R	1991.06.26	Rome (ITA)
570	Bulgaria	94	93	+1	Jordi Villacampa	32	1991 EuroBasket 1R	1991.06.25	Rome (ITA)
569	Yugoslavia	67	76	-9	Antonio Martín	18	1991 EuroBasket 1R	1991.06.24	Rome (ITA)
568	Soviet Union	91	89	+2			1991 Friendly	1991.06.19	Ourense
567	Czechoslovakia	113	89	+24			1991 Friendly	1991.06.18	Ourense
566	Soviet Union	86	85	+1			1991 Friendly	1991.06.07	Athens (GRE)
565	Yugoslavia	88	90	-2			1991 Friendly	1991.06.06	Athens (GRE)
564	Italy	85	102	-17			1991 Friendly	1991.06.05	Athens (GRE)
563	Yugoslavia	95	82	+13			1990 Friendly	1990.12.05	Tuzla (BIH)
562	Germany	78	79	-1			1990 Friendly	1990.12.01	Stuttgart (GER)
561	England	96	79	+17			1990 Friendly	1990.11.28	Murcia
560	Italy	83	106	-23	Jordi Villacampa	24	1990 World Cup CR	1990.08.19	Salta (ARG)
559	Canada	84	75	+9	Andrés Jiménez	20	1990 World Cup CR	1990.08.17	Salta (ARG)
558	Venezuela	122	102	+20	Jordi Villacampa	48	1990 World Cup CR	1990.08.15	Salta (ARG)
557	China	130	86	+44	Andreu, J.A.Montero	23	1990 World Cup CR	1990.08.14	Salta (ARG)
556	Egypt	107	73	+34	Jordi Villacampa	19	1990 World Cup CR	1990.08.13	Salta (ARG)
555	United States	85	95	-10	Jordi Villacampa	33	1990 World Cup 1R	1990.08.10	Villa Ballester (ARG)
554	Greece	93	102	-9	Jordi Villacampa	32	1990 World Cup 1R	1990.08.09	Villa Ballester (ARG)
553	South Korea	130	101	+29	Ferrán Martínez	30	1990 World Cup 1R	1990.08.08	Villa Ballester (ARG)
552	Italy	96	105	-9			1990 Friendly	1990.07.29	Seattle (USA)
551	Puerto Rico	74	75	-1			1990 Friendly	1990.07.27	Seattle (USA)
550	Yugoslavia	67	81	-14			1990 Friendly	1990.07.25	Seattle (USA)
549	Australia	78	71	+7			1990 Friendly	1990.07.24	Seattle (USA)
548	Brazil	89	114	-25			1990 Friendly	1990.07.23	Seattle (USA)
547	Yugoslavia	82	85	-3			1990 Friendly	1990.07.15	A Coruña
546	Venezuela	96	75	+21			1990 Friendly	1990.07.14	A Coruña
545	Soviet Union	68	82	-14			1990 Friendly	1990.07.12	Las Palmas
544	Soviet Union	82	85	-3			1990 Friendly	1990.07.11	Zaragoza
543	Yugoslavia	85	82	+3			1990 Friendly	1990.06.02	Algeciras
542	Czechoslovakia	84	77	+7			1990 Friendly	1990.06.01	Algeciras
541	Yugoslavia	97	108	-11	Jordi Villacampa	30	1991 EuroBasket qualification	1989.11.29	Palma de Mallorca
540	Germany	75	64	+11	Antonio Martín	22	1991 EuroBasket qualification	1989.11.25	Palma de Mallorca
539	England	99	83	+16	Antonio Martín	24	1991 EuroBasket qualification	1989.11.22	Birmingham (ENG)
538	France	95	87	+8	San Epifanio	22	1989 EuroBasket CR	1989.06.25	Zagreb (CRO)
537	Bulgaria	108	85	+23	Ferrán Martínez	27	1989 EuroBasket CR	1989.06.24	Zagreb (CRO)
536	Soviet Union	96	108	-12	San Epifanio	26	1989 EuroBasket 1R	1989.06.22	Zagreb (CRO)
535	Italy	76	97	-21	Ferrán Martínez	20	1989 EuroBasket 1R	1989.06.21	Zagreb (CRO)
534	Netherlands	78	76	+2	Andrés Jiménez	19	1989 EuroBasket 1R	1989.06.20	Zagreb (CRO)
533	France	114	109	+5			1990 Friendly	1989.06.14	Zaragoza
532	Poland	128	71	+57			1989 Friendly	1989.06.13	Zaragoza
531	France	108	96	+12			1989 Friendly	1989.06.10	Algeciras
530	Soviet Union	95	109	-14			1989 Friendly	1989.05.26	Logroño
529	Cuba	103	90	+13			1989 Friendly	1989.05.25	Logroño
528	Puerto Rico	91	90	+1			1989 Friendly	1989.05.24	Logroño
527	Italy	81	80	+1	José Antonio Montero	23	1989 EuroBasket qualification	1988.12.01	Seville
526	Switzerland	130	53	+77	R.Vecina, F.Martínez	18	1989 EuroBasket qualification	1988.11.24	Geneva (SUI)
525	Puerto Rico	92	93	-1	Andrés Jiménez	31	1988 Olympics CR	1988.09.29	Seoul (KOR)
524	Canada	91	96	-5	Fernando Arcega	16	1988 Olympics CR	1988.09.28	Seoul (KOR)
523	Australia	74	77	-3	Andrés Jiménez	15	1988 Olympics QF	1988.09.26	Seoul (KOR)
522	Brazil	118	110	+8	Andrés Jiménez	27	1988 Olympics 1R	1988.09.24	Seoul (KOR)
521	Canada	94	84	+10	Andrés Jiménez	23	1988 Olympics 1R	1988.09.23	Seoul (KOR)
520	China	106	74	+32	Jordi Villacampa	18	1988 Olympics 1R	1988.09.21	Seoul (KOR)
519	Egypt	113	70	+43	Jordi Villacampa	20	1988 Olympics 1R	1988.09.20	Seoul (KOR)
518	United States	53	97	-46	José Antonio Montero	12	1988 Olympics 1R	1988.09.18	Seoul (KOR)
517	Brazil	91	102	-11			1988 Friendly	1988.09.08	Beijing (CHN)
516	China	120	103	+17			1988 Friendly	1988.09.05	Beijing (CHN)
515	Iran	89	58	+31			1988 Friendly	1988.09.04	Beijing (CHN)
514	England	94	58	+36			1988 Friendly	1988.09.03	Beijing (CHN)
513	Yugoslavia	73	84	-11	Andrés Jiménez	14	1988 Olympics qualification	1988.07.10	Rotterdam (NED)
512	Soviet Union	82	129	-44	Jordi Villacampa	16	1988 Olympics qualification	1988.07.09	Rotterdam (NED)
511	Greece	91	84	+7	José Biriukov	24	1988 Olympics qualification	1988.07.08	Rotterdam (NED)
510	West Germany	106	96	+10	Jordi Villacampa	22	1988 Olympics qualification	1988.07.06	Rotterdam (NED)
509	Italy	90	91	-1	Andrés Jiménez	28	1988 Olympics qualification	1988.07.05	Rotterdam (NED)
508	France	97	70	+27	Juan Antonio Morales	15	1988 Olympics qualification	1988.07.04	Rotterdam (NED)
507	Netherlands	94	68	+26	Jiménez, Martínez, San Epifanio	18	1988 Olympics qualification	1988.07.01	Groningen (NED)
506	Sweden	103	97	+6	Andrés Jiménez	32	1988 Olympics qualification	1988.06.30	Groningen (NED)
505	Ireland	118	62	+56	Ferrán Martínez	20	1988 Olympics qualification	1988.06.29	Groningen (NED)
504	Great Britain	98	64	+34	Andrés Jiménez	24	1988 Olympics qualification	1988.06.28	Groningen (NED)
503	Soviet Union	77	93	-16	Andrés Jiménez	15	1988 Friendly	1988.06.18	Puerto Real
502	Czechoslovakia	96	84	+12	Biriukov, Jiménez, Martínez	15	1988 Friendly	1988.06.17	Puerto Real
501	Soviet Union	79	98	-19	Andrés Jiménez	14	1988 Friendly	1988.06.14	Palma de Mallorca
500	Czechoslovakia	92	72	+20	San Epifanio	16	1988 Friendly	1988.06.13	Palma de Mallorca
499	Hungary	100	84	+16	Andrés Jiménez	28	1989 EuroBasket qualification	1988.02.04	Zalaegerszeg (HUN)
498	Italy	75	87	-12	A.Jiménez, San Epifanio	19	1989 EuroBasket qualification	1988.01.20	Trieste (ITA)
497	Switzerland	132	59	+73	Chicho Sibilio	20	1989 EuroBasket qualification	1987.11.05	Palma de Mallorca
496	Hungary	122	63	+59	Ferrán Martínez	21	1989 EuroBasket qualification	1987.10.29	Seville
495	Tunisia	101	72	+29	Ferrán Martínez	17	1987 Mediterranean Games MR	1987.09.19	Aleppo (SYR)
494	Syria	106	78	+28	Ferrán Martínez	21	1987 Mediterranean Games MR	1987.09.17	Aleppo (SYR)
493	Lebanon	142	62	+80	Ferrán Martínez	29	1987 Mediterranean Games MR	1987.09.15	Aleppo (SYR)
492	Turkey	62	63	-1	J.A. Rosa, F.J. Zapata	14	1987 Mediterranean Games MR	1987.09.14	Aleppo (SYR)
491	Greece	85	71	+14	Josep Cargol	17	1987 Mediterranean Games MR	1987.09.13	Aleppo (SYR)
490	Yugoslavia	87	98	-11	F. Romay, San Epifanio	17	1987 EuroBasket 3P	1987.06.13	Athens (GRE)
489	Soviet Union	96	113	-17	Andrés Jiménez	30	1987 EuroBasket SF	1987.06.12	Athens (GRE)
488	West Germany	107	77	+30	San Epifanio	33	1987 EuroBasket QF	1987.06.09	Athens (GRE)
487	Soviet Union	88	104	-16	Andrés Jiménez	20	1987 EuroBasket 1R	1987.06.07	Athens (GRE)
486	Yugoslavia	76	94	-18	Solozábal, San Epifanio	20	1987 EuroBasket 1R	1987.06.06	Athens (GRE)
485	Greece	106	89	+17	Andrés Jiménez	28	1987 EuroBasket 1R	1987.06.05	Athens (GRE)
484	Romania	116	98	+18	Andrés Jiménez	24	1987 EuroBasket 1R	1987.06.04	Athens (GRE)
483	France	111	70	+41	San Epifanio	34	1987 EuroBasket 1R	1987.06.03	Athens (GRE)
482	Italy	108	107	+1			1987 Friendly	1987.05.28	Reggio Calabria (ITA)
481	Greece	98	101	-3			1987 Friendly	1987.05.27	Reggio Calabria (ITA)
480	Soviet Union	93	85	+8			1987 Friendly	1987.05.22	Toledo
479	Italy	110	87	+23			1987 Friendly	1987.05.20	Toledo
478	Cuba	104	82	+22			1987 Friendly	1987.05.16	Seville
477	Italy	87	69	+18	Jordi Villacampa	23	1986 World Cup CR	1986.07.20	Madrid
476	Canada	100	80	+20	San Epifanio	19	1986 World Cup CR	1986.07.17	Madrid
475	Cuba	78	77	+1	Chicho Sibilio, San Epifanio	17	1986 World Cup 2R	1986.07.15	Barcelona
474	Soviet Union	83	88	-5	San Epifanio	27	1986 World Cup 2R	1986.07.14	Barcelona
473	Israel	94	65	+29	Fernando Martín	28	1986 World Cup 2R	1986.07.13	Barcelona
472	Brazil	72	86	-14	Chicho Sibilio	19	1986 World Cup 1R	1986.07.10	Zaragoza
471	Panama	125	70	+55	Chicho Sibilio, San Epifanio	20	1986 World Cup 1R	1986.07.09	Zaragoza
470	Greece	87	86	+1	San Epifanio	24	1986 World Cup 1R	1986.07.07	Zaragoza
469	South Korea	120	73	+47	Chicho Sibilio	24	1986 World Cup 1R	1986.07.06	Zaragoza
468	France	84	80	+4	San Epifanio	20	1986 World Cup 1R	1986.07.05	Zaragoza
467	Soviet Union	85	102	-17			1986 Friendly	1986.06.25	Valencia
466	Netherlands	115	76	+39			1986 Friendly	1986.06.23	Valencia
465	Czechoslovakia	121	80	+41			1986 Friendly	1986.06.05	Alcázar de San Juan
464	West Germany	113	81	+32			1986 Friendly	1986.05.31	Huelva
463	Italy	90	102	-12	Chicho Sibilio	21	1985 EuroBasket 3P	1985.06.15	Stuttgart (GER)
462	Czechoslovakia	95	98	-3	Fernando Martín	26	1985 EuroBasket SF	1985.06.14	Stuttgart (GER)
461	West Germany	98	83	+15	San Epifanio	36	1985 EuroBasket QF	1985.06.11	Stuttgart (GER)
460	France	109	83	+26	Josep Maria Margall	21	1985 EuroBasket 1R	1985.06.09	Karlsruhe (GER)
459	Soviet Union	99	92	+7	Chicho Sibilio	17	1985 EuroBasket 1R	1985.06.08	Karlsruhe (GER)
458	Romania	106	94	+12	San Epifanio	22	1985 EuroBasket 1R	1985.06.07	Karlsruhe (GER)
457	Poland	99	97	+2	San Epifanio	25	1985 EuroBasket 1R	1985.06.06	Karlsruhe (GER)
456	Yugoslavia	83	99	-16	Fernando Martín	19	1985 EuroBasket 1R	1985.06.05	Karlsruhe (GER)
455	Soviet Union	107	128	-21			1985 Friendly	1985.05.21	León
454	Czechoslovakia	87	74	+13			1985 Friendly	1985.05.20	León
453	Soviet Union	108	96	+12			1985 Friendly	1985.05.17	Toledo
452	United States	65	96	-31	Andrés Jiménez	16	1984 Olympics F	1984.08.10	Los Angeles (USA)
451	Yugoslavia	74	61	+13	Josep Maria Margall	16	1984 Olympics SF	1984.08.08	Los Angeles (USA)
450	Australia	101	93	+8	F.Martín, San Epifanio	25	1984 Olympics QF	1984.08.07	Los Angeles (USA)
449	United States	68	101	-33	San Epifanio	17	1984 Olympics 1R	1984.08.04	Los Angeles (USA)
448	China	102	83	+19	Iturriaga	20	1984 Olympics 1R	1984.08.03	Los Angeles (USA)
447	France	97	82	+15	F.Martín, San Epifanio	23	1984 Olympics 1R	1984.08.02	Los Angeles (USA)
446	Uruguay	107	90	+17	San Epifanio	33	1984 Olympics 1R	1984.08.01	Los Angeles (USA)
445	Canada	83	82	+1	Fernando Martín	27	1984 Olympics 1R	1984.07.30	Los Angeles (USA)
444	Yugoslavia	100	76	+24	San Epifanio	24	1984 Friendly	1984.06.24	Chieti (ITA)
443	Italy	93	98	-5	San Epifanio	32	1984 Friendly	1984.06.23	Chieti (ITA)
442	Soviet Union	81	86	-5	J.M.Margall, A.Jiménez	20	1984 Friendly	1984.06.22	Chieti (ITA)
441	Soviet Union	92	119	-27	F.Martín, San Epifanio	20	1984 Olympics qualification	1984.05.25	Paris (FRA)
440	France	117	102	+15	J.M.Margall, San Epifanio	29	1984 Olympics qualification	1984.05.24	Paris (FRA)
439	Great Britain	102	91	+11	San Epifanio	27	1984 Olympics qualification	1984.05.23	Paris (FRA)
438	Israel	120	97	+23	Fernando Martín	29	1984 Olympics qualification	1984.05.21	Paris (FRA)
437	West Germany	99	78	+21	San Epifanio	32	1984 Olympics qualification	1984.05.20	Paris (FRA)
436	Sweden	97	76	+21	Fernando Martín	31	1984 Olympics qualification	1984.05.19	Paris (FRA)
435	Greece	90	89	+1	San Epifanio	31	1984 Olympics qualification	1984.05.17	Le Mans (FRA)
434	Switzerland	111	78	+33	Iturriaga, Andrés Jiménez	21	1984 Olympics qualification	1984.05.16	Le Mans (FRA)
433	Turkey	111	74	+37	J.D. de la Cruz	21	1984 Olympics qualification	1984.05.15	Le Mans (FRA)
432	Soviet Union	76	85	-9	Fernando Martín	23	1984 Friendly	1984.05.03	Puerto Real
431	Poland	98	83	+15	Josep Maria Margall	20	1984 Friendly	1984.05.02	Puerto Real
430	Israel	76	77	-1	San Epifanio	30	1984 Friendly	1984.05.01	Puerto Real
429	Soviet Union	94	117	-23	Iturriaga	26	1984 Friendly	1984.04.28	Linares
428	Poland	100	71	+29	San Epifanio	16	1984 Friendly	1984.04.27	Linares
427	Italy	96	105	-9	San Epifanio	21	1983 EuroBasket F	1983.06.04	Nantes (FRA)
426	Soviet Union	95	94	+1	Chicho Sibilio	26	1983 EuroBasket SF	1983.06.01	Nantes (FRA)
425	Greece	100	79	+21	San Epifanio	20	1983 EuroBasket 1R	1983.05.30	Limoges (FRA)
424	Sweden	81	76	+5	Chicho Sibilio	21	1983 EuroBasket 1R	1983.05.29	Limoges (FRA)
423	France	75	73	+2	Chicho Sibilio	24	1983 EuroBasket 1R	1983.05.28	Limoges (FRA)
422	Yugoslavia	91	90	+1	San Epifanio	21	1983 EuroBasket 1R	1983.05.27	Limoges (FRA)
421	Italy	74	75	-1	San Epifanio	24	1983 EuroBasket 1R	1983.05.26	Limoges (FRA)
420	Soviet Union	78	88	-10	Fernando Martín	21	1983 Friendly	1983.05.17	Palma de Mallorca
419	Soviet Union	98	79	+19	San Epifanio	25	1983 Friendly	1983.05.14	Santiago de Compostela
418	Panama	114	84	+30	F.Martín, San Epifanio	17	1983 Friendly	1983.05.13	Santiago de Compostela
417	Yugoslavia	117	119	-2	Fernando Martín	21	1982 World Cup 3P	1982.08.28	Cali (COL)
416	Soviet Union	93	106	-13	San Epifanio	22	1982 World Cup 2R	1982.08.25	Cali (COL)
415	Canada	83	80	+3	San Epifanio	15	1982 World Cup 2R	1982.08.24	Cali (COL)
414	Australia	99	87	+12	Chicho Sibilio	27	1982 World Cup 2R	1982.08.22	Cali (COL)
413	Yugoslavia	91	108	-17	San Epifanio	20	1982 World Cup 2R	1982.08.21	Cali (COL)
412	Colombia	137	84	+53	Iturriaga	24	1982 World Cup 1R	1982.08.20	Cali (COL)
411	United States	109	99	+10	San Epifanio	28	1982 World Cup 1R	1982.08.17	Bogotá (COL)
410	China	108	78	+30	Wayne Brabender	28	1982 World Cup 1R	1982.08.16	Bogotá (COL)
409	Panama	88	85	+3	Chicho Sibilio	24	1982 World Cup 1R	1982.08.15	Bogotá (COL)
408	Soviet Union	88	84	+4	Chicho Sibilio	28	1982 Friendly	1982.07.28	Burgos
407	Cuba	102	97	+5	Fernando Martín	23	1982 Friendly	1982.07.27	Burgos
406	Soviet Union	99	115	-16	Fernando Martín	32	1982 Friendly	1982.07.24	Palma de Mallorca
405	Yugoslavia	90	88	+2	Fernando Martín	25	1982 Friendly	1982.07.23	Palma de Mallorca
404	Cuba	97	93	+4	San Epifanio	21	1982 Friendly	1982.07.22	Palma de Mallorca
403	Czechoslovakia	90	101	-11	Chicho Sibilio	28	1981 EuroBasket 3P	1981.06.05	Prague (CZE)
402	Yugoslavia	72	95	-23	Chicho Sibilio	21	1981 EuroBasket 2R	1981.06.03	Prague (CZE)
401	Soviet Union	101	110	-9	Chicho Sibilio	25	1981 EuroBasket 2R	1981.06.02	Prague (CZE)
400	Italy	87	86	+1	W. Brabender, C.Sibilio	17	1981 EuroBasket 2R	1981.06.01	Prague (CZE)
399	Greece	111	72	+39	Chicho Sibilio	31	1981 EuroBasket 1R	1981.05.30	Bratislava (SVK)
398	England	78	47	+31	W. Brabender, J.M. Margall	18	1981 EuroBasket 1R	1981.05.29	Bratislava (SVK)
397	Czechoslovakia	72	69	+3	San Epifanio	28	1981 EuroBasket 1R	1981.05.28	Bratislava (SVK)
396	Israel	89	81	+8	San Epifanio	28	1981 EuroBasket 1R	1981.05.27	Bratislava (SVK)
395	France	102	93	+9	Chicho Sibilio	20	1981 EuroBasket 1R	1981.05.26	Bratislava (SVK)
394	Italy	80	93	-13	Chicho Sibilio	16	1981 Friendly	1981.05.22	Bergamo (ITA)
393	France	125	108	+17	Chicho Sibilio, Rafael Rullán	21	1981 Friendly	1981.05.15	Agen (FRA)
392	France	109	106	+3	Chicho Sibilio	24	1981 Friendly	1981.05.13	Bordeaux (FRA)
391	Soviet Union	94	117	-23	Iturriaga	23	1980 Olympics 3P	1980.07.30	Moscow (RUS)
390	Italy	89	95	-6	Chicho Sibilio	24	1980 Olympics 2R	1980.07.29	Moscow (RUS)
389	Cuba	96	95	+1	Chicho Sibilio	26	1980 Olympics 2R	1980.07.27	Moscow (RUS)
388	Brazil	110	81	+29	Chicho Sibilio	33	1980 Olympics 2R	1980.07.26	Moscow (RUS)
387	Soviet Union	102	119	-17	San Epifanio	21	1980 Olympics 2R	1980.07.25	Moscow (RUS)
386	Yugoslavia	91	95	-4	Wayne Brabender	30	1980 Olympics 1R	1980.07.23	Moscow (RUS)
385	Senegal	94	65	+29	Chicho Sibilio	32	1980 Olympics 1R	1980.07.22	Moscow (RUS)
384	Poland	104	81	+23	Chicho Sibilio	27	1980 Olympics 1R	1980.07.21	Moscow (RUS)
383	Soviet Union	82	93	-11	Chicho Sibilio	15	1980 Friendly	1980.07.10	Moscow (RUS)
382	Soviet Union	72	98	-26	J.D. de la Cruz, C.Sibilio	16	1980 Friendly	1980.07.09	Moscow (RUS)
381	Israel	100	89	+11	J.D. de la Cruz	27	1980 Olympics qualification	1980.05.17	Geneva (SUI)
380	Italy	79	93	-14	San Epifanio	17	1980 Olympics qualification	1980.05.16	Geneva (SUI)
379	Sweden	86	87	-1	San Epifanio	20	1980 Olympics qualification	1980.05.15	Geneva (SUI)
378	France	103	100	+3	Wayne Brabender	40	1980 Olympics qualification	1980.05.14	Geneva (SUI)
377	Czechoslovakia	68	70	-2	J.D. de la Cruz	17	1980 Olympics qualification	1980.05.13	Geneva (SUI)
376	West Germany	85	59	+26	Wayne Brabender	21	1980 Olympics qualification	1980.05.12	Geneva (SUI)
375	Finland	107	92	+15	Manuel Flores	30	1980 Olympics qualification	1980.05.10	Lucerne (SUI)
374	Poland	107	81	+26	J.D. de la Cruz	28	1980 Olympics qualification	1980.05.09	Lucerne (SUI)
373	Great Britain	125	63	+62	Wayne Brabender	31	1980 Olympics qualification	1980.05.08	Lucerne (SUI)
372	Hungary	97	50	+47	Wayne Brabender	28	1980 Olympics qualification	1980.05.06	Lucerne (SUI)
371	Soviet Union	83	100	-17	Wayne Brabender	16	1980 Friendly	1980.05.01	A Coruña
370	Italy	100	101	-1	Wayne Brabender	34	1980 Friendly	1980.04.30	A Coruña
369	France	90	93	-3	José Luis Díaz	23	1980 Friendly	1980.04.29	A Coruña
368	Soviet Union	80	93	-13			1980 Friendly	1980.04.26	Palma de Mallorca
367	France	92	72	+20	Wayne Brabender	32	1980 Friendly	1980.04.25	Palma de Mallorca
366	Netherlands	87	81	+6	Rafael Rullán	23	1980 Friendly	1980.04.24	Palma de Mallorca
365	Soviet Union	89	90	-1	Wayne Brabender	24	1980 Friendly	1980.04.22	Girona
364	Czechoslovakia	100	107	-7	San Epifanio	20	1979 EuroBasket 2R	1979.06.18	Turin (ITA)
363	Yugoslavia	100	108	-8	J.D. de la Cruz	21	1979 EuroBasket 2R	1979.06.17	Turin (ITA)
362	Italy	80	81	-1	Wayne Brabender	17	1979 EuroBasket 2R	1979.06.15	Turin (ITA)
361	Israel	84	88	-4	Wayne Brabender	26	1979 EuroBasket 2R	1979.06.14	Turin (ITA)
360	Soviet Union	101	90	+11	J.D. de la Cruz	23	1979 EuroBasket 1R	1979.06.11	Siena (ITA)
359	Netherlands	105	83	+22	Wayne Brabender	31	1979 EuroBasket 1R	1979.06.10	Siena (ITA)
358	Bulgaria	85	81	+4	Wayne Brabender	29	1979 EuroBasket 1R	1979.06.09	Siena (ITA)
357	Sweden	79	74	+5	Wayne Brabender	22	1979 EuroBasket qualification	1979.05.25	Salónica (GRE)
356	Greece	89	88	+1	Luis Miguel Santillana	24	1979 EuroBasket qualification	1979.05.23	Salónica (GRE)
355	Finland	99	85	+14	Wayne Brabender	30	1979 EuroBasket qualification	1979.05.22	Salónica (GRE)
354	France	79	93	-14	Wayne Brabender	27	1979 EuroBasket qualification	1979.05.20	Athens (GRE)
353	Romania	85	83	+2	San Epifanio	16	1979 EuroBasket qualification	1979.05.19	Athens (GRE)
352	Poland	93	81	+12	Iturriaga	30	1979 EuroBasket qualification	1979.05.18	Athens (GRE)
351	Scotland	113	68	+45	Pedro Ansa	22	1979 EuroBasket qualification	1979.05.17	Athens (GRE)
350	West Germany	103	88	+15	Wayne Brabender	17	1979 EuroBasket qualification	1979.05.16	Athens (GRE)
349	Austria	104	76	+28			1979 Friendly	1979.05.07	Haifa (ISR)
348	Finland	83	79	+4			1979 Friendly	1979.05.05	Jordan Valley (ISR)
347	Israel	86	80	+6			1979 Friendly	1979.05.03	Tel Aviv (ISR)
346	Cuba	97	85	+12			1979 Friendly	1979.04.28	Ferrol
345	Cuba	85	98	-13			1979 Friendly	1979.04.26	Móstoles
344	Finland	106	89	+17	Josep Maria Margall	25	1977 EuroBasket CR	1977.09.24	Liège (BEL)
343	Austria	88	84	+4	Manuel Flores	26	1977 EuroBasket CR	1977.09.23	Liège (BEL)
342	Finland	85	78	+7	Wayne Brabender	23	1977 EuroBasket 1R	1977.09.20	Ostend (BEL)
341	Belgium	94	93	+1	Luis María Prada	21	1977 EuroBasket 1R	1977.09.19	Ostend (BEL)
340	Czechoslovakia	70	73	-3	Wayne Brabender	15	1977 EuroBasket 1R	1977.09.17	Ostend (BEL)
339	Netherlands	95	114	-19	Wayne Brabender	20	1977 EuroBasket 1R	1977.09.16	Ostend (BEL)
338	Yugoslavia	76	79	-3	Rafael Rullán	20	1977 EuroBasket 1R	1977.09.15	Ostend (BEL)
337	France	96	81	+15			1977 Friendly	1977.09.07	Barcelona
336	Soviet Union	87	92	-5			1977 Friendly	1977.09.05	Barcelona
335	Soviet Union	81	85	-4			1977 Friendly	1977.09.03	Zaragoza
334	Cuba	93	87	+6			1977 Friendly	1977.09.02	Zaragoza
333	France	108	72	+36			1977 Friendly	1977.09.01	Zaragoza
332	Brazil	100	109	-9	Luis Miguel Santillana	26	1976 Olympics qualification	1976.07.03	Hamilton (CAN)
331	Yugoslavia	71	96	-25	Rafael Rullán	12	1976 Olympics qualification	1976.07.02	Hamilton (CAN)
330	Czechoslovakia	94	89	+5	G.Sagi-Vela	28	1976 Olympics qualification	1976.07.01	Hamilton (CAN)
329	Sweden	91	78	+13	Wayne Brabender	24	1976 Olympics qualification	1976.06.29	Hamilton (CAN)
328	Bulgaria	115	79	+36	Luis Miguel Santillana	28	1976 Olympics qualification	1976.06.28	Hamilton (CAN)
327	Great Britain	98	79	+19	G.Sagi-Vela, W.Brabender	18	1976 Olympics qualification	1976.06.27	Hamilton (CAN)
326	Netherlands	97	86	+11	Wayne Brabender	24	1976 Olympics qualification	1976.06.24	Hamilton (CAN)
325	Mexico	72	73	-1	G.Sagi-Vela	23	1976 Olympics qualification	1976.06.23	Hamilton (CAN)
324	Poland	99	73	+26	Wayne Brabender	22	1976 Olympics qualification	1976.06.22	Hamilton (CAN)
323	Canada	85	87	-2			1976 Friendly	1976.06.17	Montreal (CAN)
322	Canada	64	92	-28			1976 Friendly	1976.06.16	Montreal (CAN)
321	Canada	103	80	+23			1976 Friendly	1976.05.30	Alcalá de Henares
320	Cuba	100	94	+6			1976 Friendly	1976.05.26	Madrid
319	Italy	73	78	-5	Juan Filba	21	1975 Mediterranean Games MR	1975.08.30	Argel (ALG)
318	Tunisia	100	65	+35	Luis María Prada	34	1975 Mediterranean Games MR	1975.08.27	Argel (ALG)
317	Greece	80	74	+6	Juan Filba	25	1975 Mediterranean Games MR	1975.08.26	Argel (ALG)
316	Yugoslavia	66	78	-12	Juan Filba	16	1975 Mediterranean Games MR	1975.08.24	Argel (ALG)
315	Italy	64	81	-17	Juan Filba	16	1975 Friendly	1975.08.20	Ischia (ITA)
314	Czechoslovakia	87	67	+20	Jesús Iradier, W.Brabender	22	1975 EuroBasket 2R	1975.06.15	Belgrade (SRB)
313	Soviet Union	80	94	-14	Wayne Brabender	24	1975 EuroBasket 2R	1975.06.14	Belgrade (SRB)
312	Italy	69	89	-20	Wayne Brabender	21	1975 EuroBasket 2R	1975.06.13	Belgrade (SRB)
311	Yugoslavia	76	98	-22	Wayne Brabender	20	1975 EuroBasket 2R	1975.06.11	Belgrade (SRB)
310	Greece	89	63	+26	Wayne Brabender	15	1975 EuroBasket 1R	1975.06.09	Rijeka (CRO)
309	Romania	96	66	+30	Wayne Brabender	24	1975 EuroBasket 1R	1975.06.08	Rijeka (CRO)
308	Bulgaria	85	74	+11	Wayne Brabender	26	1975 EuroBasket 1R	1975.06.07	Rijeka (CRO)
307	Canada	88	66	+22	Carmelo Cabrera	20	1975 Friendly	1975.05.25	Lugo
306	Canada	94	102	-8	Wayne Brabender	20	1975 Friendly	1975.05.21	Bilbao
305	Yugoslavia	71	79	-8	Wayne Brabender	18	1974 World Cup 2R	1974.07.14	San Juan (PUR)
304	Brazil	93	91	+2	Wayne Brabender	30	1974 World Cup 2R	1974.07.13	San Juan (PUR)
303	Cuba	75	84	-9	Wayne Brabender	22	1974 World Cup 2R	1974.07.12	San Juan (PUR)
302	Canada	73	86	-13	Wayne Brabender	28	1974 World Cup 2R	1974.07.09	San Juan (PUR)
301	Puerto Rico	102	86	+16	Wayne Brabender	30	1974 World Cup 2R	1974.07.08	San Juan (PUR)
300	Soviet Union	71	100	-29	Luis Miguel Santillana	21	1974 World Cup 2R	1974.07.07	San Juan (PUR)
299	Philippines	117	85	+32	Wayne Brabender	37	1974 World Cup 1R	1974.07.05	Ponce (PUR)
298	United States	71	114	-43	Jesús Iradier	14	1974 World Cup 1R	1974.07.04	Caguas (PUR)
297	Argentina	96	89	+7	Wayne Brabender	22	1974 World Cup 1R	1974.07.03	San Juan (PUR)
296	Cuba	64	65	-1			1974 Friendly	1974.06.27	La Habana (CUB)
295	Panama	114	64	+50			1974 Friendly	1974.06.26	La Habana (CUB)
294	Panama	81	62	+19			1974 Friendly	1974.06.22	Panama City (PAN)
293	Panama	87	78	+9			1974 Friendly	1974.06.21	Panama City (PAN)
292	Panama	94	80	+14			1974 Friendly	1974.06.20	Panama City (PAN)
291	El Salvador	124	66	+58			1974 Friendly	1974.06.18	San Salvador (ESA)
290	Argentina	109	89	+20			1974 Friendly	1974.06.09	Cáceres
289	Argentina	99	75	+24			1974 Friendly	1974.06.06	Cuenca
288	Yugoslavia	67	78	-11	Wayne Brabender	22	1973 EuroBasket F	1973.10.06	Barcelona
287	Soviet Union	80	76	+4	Wayne Brabender	20	1973 EuroBasket SF	1973.10.04	Barcelona
286	Greece	86	74	+12	Wayne Brabender	20	1973 EuroBasket 1R	1973.10.02	Barcelona
285	France	85	80	+5	Wayne Brabender	18	1973 EuroBasket 1R	1973.10.01	Barcelona
284	Italy	77	65	+12	Wayne Brabender	23	1973 EuroBasket 1R	1973.09.29	Barcelona
283	Bulgaria	85	69	+16	Luis Miguel Santillana	16	1973 EuroBasket 1R	1973.09.28	Barcelona
282	Yugoslavia	59	65	-6	Wayne Brabender	20	1973 EuroBasket 1R	1973.09.27	Barcelona
281	France	82	73	+9			1973 Friendly	1973.09.14	Grenoble (FRA)
280	Italy	73	55	+18			1973 Friendly	1973.09.13	Grenoble (FRA)
279	Canada	77	82	-5			1973 Friendly	1973.08.28	Pineda de Mar
278	China	95	64	+31			1973 Friendly	1973.08.06	Valls
277	China	80	50	+30			1973 Friendly	1973.08.04	Barcelona
276	West Germany	84	83	+1	Clifford Luyk	31	1972 Olympics CR	1972.09.08	Munich (GER)
275	Poland	76	87	-11	Clifford Luyk	18	1972 Olympics CR	1972.09.06	Munich (GER)
274	Czechoslovakia	70	74	-4	Clifford Luyk	17	1972 Olympics 1R	1972.09.03	Munich (GER)
273	United States	56	72	-16	L.M. Santillana, R.Rullán	14	1972 Olympics 1R	1972.09.02	Munich (GER)
272	Japan	87	76	+11	Wayne Brabender	29	1972 Olympics 1R	1972.09.01	Munich (GER)
271	Egypt	72	58	+14	Rafael Rullán	16	1972 Olympics 1R	1972.08.30	Munich (GER)
270	Brazil	69	72	-3	Wayne Brabender	22	1972 Olympics 1R	1972.08.29	Munich (GER)
269	Cuba	53	74	-21	Luis Miguel Santillana	14	1972 Olympics 1R	1972.08.28	Munich (GER)
268	Australia	79	74	+5	Vicente Ramos	17	1972 Olympics 1R	1972.08.27	Munich (GER)
267	Mexico	75	69	+6	Wayne Brabender	24	1972 Olympics qualification	1972.08.19	Augsburg (GER)
266	Bulgaria	67	64	+3	G.Sagi-Vela	14	1972 Olympics qualification	1972.08.18	Augsburg (GER)
265	Poland	78	82	-4	Wayne Brabender	27	1972 Olympics qualification	1972.08.17	Augsburg (GER)
264	Finland	90	71	+19	G.Sagi-Vela	20	1972 Olympics qualification	1972.08.16	Augsburg (GER)
263	Canada	94	68	+26	Wayne Brabender	24	1972 Olympics qualification	1972.08.14	Augsburg (GER)
262	Greece	88	82	+6	Clifford Luyk	21	1972 Olympics qualification	1972.08.13	Augsburg (GER)
261	Sweden	77	67	+10	Wayne Brabender	21	1972 Olympics qualification	1972.08.11	Augsburg (GER)
260	Romania	82	81	+1			1972 Friendly	1972.08.06	Vitoria
259	Romania	82	77	+5			1972 Friendly	1972.08.04	Bilbao
258	Argentina	78	76	+2			1972 Friendly	1972.07.29	Buenos Aires (ARG)
257	Brazil	86	89	-3			1972 Friendly	1972.07.28	Buenos Aires (ARG)
256	United States	97	80	+17			1972 Friendly	1972.07.27	Buenos Aires (ARG)
255	Mexico	80	81	-1			1972 Friendly	1972.07.21	São Paulo (BRA)
254	Brazil	80	85	-5			1972 Friendly	1972.07.20	São Paulo (BRA)
253	United States	82	100	-18			1972 Friendly	1972.07.19	São Paulo (BRA)
252	Argentina	68	58	+10	Clifford Luyk	19	1972 Friendly	1972.07.17	São Paulo (BRA)
251	Netherlands	102	79	+23	Wayne Brabender	33	1972 Olympics qualification	1972.05.13	Amsterdam (NED)
250	Sweden	93	77	+16	W. Brabender, C. Luyk	20	1972 Olympics qualification	1972.05.12	Amsterdam (NED)
249	France	90	78	+12	Wayne Brabender	19	1972 Olympics qualification	1972.05.11	Amsterdam (NED)
248	Italy	67	66	+1	Wayne Brabender	22	1972 Olympics qualification	1972.05.09	Amsterdam (NED)
247	Bulgaria	108	84	+24	Clifford Luyk	31	1972 Olympics qualification	1972.05.08	Amsterdam (NED)
246	Czechoslovakia	87	88	-1	Wayne Brabender	30	1972 Olympics qualification	1972.05.07	Amsterdam (NED)
245	Hungary	96	67	+29	Wayne Brabender	20	1972 Olympics qualification	1972.05.05	Groningen (NED)
244	Poland	86	88	-2	Wayne Brabender	26	1972 Olympics qualification	1972.05.04	Groningen (NED)
243	Great Britain	96	63	+33	Wayne Brabender	27	1972 Olympics qualification	1972.05.03	Groningen (NED)
242	Yugoslavia	91	84	+7	Wayne Brabender	18	1972 Friendly	1972.04.28	Barcelona
241	Brazil	88	87	+1	Wayne Brabender	20	1972 Friendly	1972.04.27	Barcelona
240	Romania	86	71	+15	Wayne Brabender	16	1971 EuroBasket CR	1971.09.18	Essen (GER)
239	Bulgaria	84	95	-11	Wayne Brabender	20	1971 EuroBasket CR	1971.09.17	Essen (GER)
238	Romania	72	76	-4	Emiliano Rodríguez	21	1971 EuroBasket 1R	1971.09.15	Essen (GER)
237	West Germany	73	69	+4	Clifford Luyk	23	1971 EuroBasket 1R	1971.09.14	Essen (GER)
236	Soviet Union	58	118	-60	Clifford Luyk	15	1971 EuroBasket 1R	1971.09.12	Essen (GER)
235	Poland	70	83	-13	Clifford Luyk	16	1971 EuroBasket 1R	1971.09.11	Essen (GER)
234	France	79	66	+13	Clifford Luyk	21	1971 EuroBasket 1R	1971.09.10	Essen (GER)
233	Italy	79	62	+17	Clifford Luyk	20	1971 Friendly	1971.05.23	Siena (ITA)
232	France	91	70	+21	Clifford Luyk	16	1971 Friendly	1971.05.22	Siena (ITA)
231	Israel	70	59	+11	Wayne Brabender	24	1971 EuroBasket qualification	1971.05.18	Tel Aviv (ISR)
230	Sweden	90	66	+24	Wayne Brabender	21	1971 EuroBasket qualification	1971.05.17	Tel Aviv (ISR)
229	Netherlands	103	75	+28	Clifford Luyk	18	1971 EuroBasket qualification	1971.05.16	Tel Aviv (ISR)
228	Romania	84	94	-10	Wayne Brabender	26	1971 EuroBasket qualification	1971.05.13	Bucarest (ROU)
227	Belgium	82	76	+6	Luis Miguel Santillana	14	1971 EuroBasket qualification	1971.05.11	Brussels (BEL)
226	Brazil	92	73	+19	Clifford Luyk	30	1970 Friendly	1970.05.07	Madrid
225	Uruguay	71	42	+29	Emiliano Rodríguez	27	1970 Friendly	1970.05.06	Madrid
224	Australia	76	66	+10	Clifford Luyk	20	1970 Friendly	1970.05.05	Madrid
223	Uruguay	88	69	+19	Clifford Luyk	20	1970 Friendly	1970.05.01	Badalona
222	Italy	71	66	+5	Nino Buscató	14	1969 EuroBasket CR	1969.10.05	Naples (ITA)
221	Bulgaria	78	75	+3	Clifford Luyk	20	1969 EuroBasket CR	1969.10.04	Caserta (ITA)
220	Israel	90	81	+9	Clifford Luyk	20	1969 EuroBasket 1R	1969.10.02	Naples (ITA)
219	Romania	78	63	+15	Nino Buscató	20	1969 EuroBasket 1R	1969.10.01	Naples (ITA)
218	Czechoslovakia	60	97	-37	Clifford Luyk	12	1969 EuroBasket 1R	1969.09.29	Naples (ITA)
217	Poland	78	79	-1	Clifford Luyk	23	1969 EuroBasket 1R	1969.09.28	Naples (ITA)
216	Italy	53	65	-12	Clifford Luyk	20	1969 EuroBasket 1R	1969.09.27	Naples (ITA)
215	Italy	62	66	-4	Clifford Luyk	21	1969 Friendly	1969.09.21	Madrid
214	France	81	83	-2	Clifford Luyk	27	1969 Friendly	1969.09.19	Madrid
213	Bulgaria	72	68	+4	Clifford Luyk	24	1969 EuroBasket qualification	1969.05.18	Mataró
212	United Arab Republic	91	42	+49	Clifford Luyk	18	1969 EuroBasket qualification	1969.05.17	Mataró
211	Belgium	78	64	+14	Emiliano Rodríguez	29	1969 EuroBasket qualification	1969.05.16	Mataró
210	Switzerland	93	52	+41	Wayne Brabender	20	1969 EuroBasket qualification	1969.05.14	Mataró
209	Cuba	93	53	+40	José Luis Sagi-Vela	18	1969 Friendly	1969.05.10	Badalona
208	Italy	88	72	+16	Clifford Luyk	25	1968 Olympics CR	1968.10.25	Mexico City (MEX)
207	Mexico	72	73	-1	Clifford Luyk	31	1968 Olympics CR	1968.10.22	Mexico City (MEX)
206	Italy	86	98	-12	Enric Margall	18	1968 Olympics 1R	1968.10.20	Mexico City (MEX)
205	Yugoslavia	79	92	-13	Emiliano Rodríguez	22	1968 Olympics 1R	1968.10.19	Mexico City (MEX)
204	Senegal	64	54	+10	Antonio Nava, Sagi-Vela	12	1968 Olympics 1R	1968.10.18	Mexico City (MEX)
203	Puerto Rico	86	62	+24	Emiliano Rodríguez	25	1968 Olympics 1R	1968.10.16	Mexico City (MEX)
202	Panama	88	82	+6	Clifford Luyk	20	1968 Olympics 1R	1968.10.15	Mexico City (MEX)
201	Philippines	108	79	+29	Clifford Luyk	29	1968 Olympics 1R	1968.10.14	Mexico City (MEX)
200	United States	46	81	-35	José Luis Sagi-Vela	10	1968 Olympics 1R	1968.10.13	Mexico City (MEX)
199	Poland	82	83	-1	Clifford Luyk	26	1968 Olympics qualification	1968.10.04	Monterrey (MEX)
198	Australia	85	66	+19	Clifford Luyk	25	1968 Olympics qualification	1968.10.03	Monterrey (MEX)
197	Uruguay	68	63	+5	N.Buscató, E.Rodríguez	18	1968 Olympics qualification	1968.09.29	Monterrey (MEX)
196	Indonesia	105	69	+36	Jesús Codina	19	1968 Olympics qualification	1968.09.27	Monterrey (MEX)
195	Puerto Rico	63	64	-1	Nino Buscató	14	1968 Friendly	1968.09.17	San Juan (PUR)
194	Mexico	88	86	+2	Emiliano Rodríguez	32	1968 Friendly	1968.06.10	Madrid
193	Romania	93	69	+24	Clifford Luyk	24	1968 Friendly	1968.06.09	Madrid
192	France	87	77	+10	Emiliano Rodríguez	20	1968 Friendly	1968.06.07	Madrid
191	Yugoslavia	73	101	-28	Moncho Monsalve	18	1967 EuroBasket CR	1967.10.08	Helsinki (FIN)
190	Greece	99	95	+4	Emiliano Rodríguez	28	1967 EuroBasket CR	1967.10.07	Helsinki (FIN)
189	Netherlands	79	71	+8	Emiliano Rodríguez	43	1967 EuroBasket 1R	1967.10.05	Helsinki (FIN)
188	Belgium	89	76	+13	Emiliano Rodríguez	27	1967 EuroBasket 1R	1967.10.04	Helsinki (FIN)
187	Finland	69	76	-7	Emiliano Rodríguez	22	1967 EuroBasket 1R	1967.10.03	Helsinki (FIN)
186	Yugoslavia	68	82	-14	Nino Buscató	18	1967 EuroBasket 1R	1967.10.01	Helsinki (FIN)
185	Czechoslovakia	65	98	-33	Ramón Guardiola	19	1967 EuroBasket 1R	1967.09.30	Helsinki (FIN)
184	Poland	71	88	-17	Alfonso Martínez	15	1967 EuroBasket 1R	1967.09.29	Helsinki (FIN)
183	Romania	85	88	-3	Emiliano Rodríguez	30	1967 EuroBasket 1R	1967.09.28	Helsinki (FIN)
182	France	72	84	-12	Emiliano Rodríguez	30	1967 Mediterranean Games MR	1967.09.16	Tunisia (TUN)
181	Algeria	102	61	+41	José Ramón Ramos	27	1967 Mediterranean Games MR	1967.09.14	Tunisia (TUN)
180	Turkey	89	101	-12	Emiliano Rodríguez	17	1967 Mediterranean Games MR	1967.09.13	Tunisia (TUN)
179	Italy	77	87	-10	Emiliano Rodríguez	25	1967 Mediterranean Games MR	1967.09.11	Tunisia (TUN)
178	Tunisia	82	54	+28	Alfonso Martínez	16	1967 Mediterranean Games MR	1967.09.09	Tunisia (TUN)
177	Poland	79	80	-1	Nino Buscató	22	1966 Friendly	1966.11.16	Paris (FRA)
176	Italy	59	82	-23	Moncho Monsalve	19	1966 Friendly	1966.11.15	Paris (FRA)
175	France	74	81	-7	Emiliano Rodríguez	29	1967 EuroBasket qualification	1966.11.13	Monaco (MON)
174	Switzerland	88	39	+49	Clifford Luyk	22	1967 EuroBasket qualification	1966.11.11	Monaco (MON)
173	Yugoslavia	65	68	-3	Clifford Luyk	18	1966 Friendly	1966.04.30	Santiago (CHI)
172	Bulgaria	72	75	-3	Clifford Luyk	18	1966 Friendly	1966.04.27	Santiago (CHI)
171	United States	71	90	-19	Clifford Luyk	25	1966 Friendly	1966.04.25	Valparaíso (CHI)
170	Soviet Union	50	87	-37	A.Martínez, M.Monsalve	10	1966 Friendly	1966.04.23	Valparaíso (CHI)
169	Brazil	66	68	-2	Clifford Luyk	18	1966 Friendly	1966.04.21	Santiago (CHI)
168	Chile	89	69	+20	Emiliano Rodríguez	36	1966 Friendly	1966.04.20	Santiago (CHI)
167	Puerto Rico	76	52	+24	Clifford Luyk	18	1966 Friendly	1966.04.18	Curicó (CHI)
166	Soviet Union	61	69	-8	Emiliano Rodríguez	20	1966 Friendly	1966.04.17	Curicó (CHI)
165	Argentina	81	70	+11	E.Rodríguez, C.Luyk	28	1966 Friendly	1966.04.16	Curicó (CHI)
164	Finland	79	76	+3	Emiliano Rodríguez	22	1965 Friendly	1965.11.07	Amsterdam (NED)
163	Belgium	86	88	-2	Emiliano Rodríguez	23	1965 Friendly	1965.11.06	Amsterdam (NED)
162	Netherlands	93	92	+1	Emiliano Rodríguez	32	1965 Friendly	1965.11.05	Amsterdam (NED)
161	Finland	65	58	+7	Emiliano Rodríguez	23	1965 EuroBasket CR	1965.06.10	Moscow (RUS)
160	East Germany	76	78	-2	Emiliano Rodríguez	23	1965 EuroBasket CR	1965.06.09	Moscow (RUS)
159	Bulgaria	56	79	-23	Emiliano Rodríguez	15	1965 EuroBasket 1R	1965.06.06	Tbilisi (GEO)
158	Greece	82	89	-7	Nino Buscató	27	1965 EuroBasket 1R	1965.06.05	Tbilisi (GEO)
157	France	90	77	+13	Emiliano Rodríguez	25	1965 EuroBasket 1R	1965.06.04	Tbilisi (GEO)
156	Yugoslavia	65	113	-48	Carlos Sevillano	13	1965 EuroBasket 1R	1965.06.02	Tbilisi (GEO)
155	Sweden	78	74	+4	Emiliano Rodríguez	31	1965 EuroBasket 1R	1965.06.01	Tbilisi (GEO)
154	West Germany	86	58	+28	Miguel González	25	1965 EuroBasket 1R	1965.05.31	Tbilisi (GEO)
153	Poland	57	82	-25	Emiliano Rodríguez	12	1965 EuroBasket 1R	1965.05.30	Tbilisi (GEO)
152	Italy	82	87	-5	Emiliano Rodríguez	21	1965 EuroBasket qualification	1965.01.31	San Sebastián
151	Switzerland	88	51	+37	Emiliano Rodríguez	24	1965 EuroBasket qualification	1965.01.30	San Sebastián
150	Netherlands	85	77	+8	Miguel González	25	1965 EuroBasket qualification	1965.01.29	San Sebastián
149	Switzerland	93	56	+37	Nino Buscató	18	1964 Friendly	1964.11.29	Badalona
148	Switzerland	98	56	+42	Miguel González	31	1964 Friendly	1964.11.28	Girona
147	Belgium	85	94	-9	Emiliano Rodríguez	20	1964 Olympics qualification	1964.06.13	Geneva (SUI)
146	East Germany	69	67	+2	Emiliano Rodríguez	25	1964 Olympics qualification	1964.06.12	Geneva (SUI)
145	Belgium	82	78	+4	Emiliano Rodríguez	21	1964 Olympics qualification	1964.06.11	Geneva (SUI)
144	Bulgaria	76	73	+3	Nino Buscató	17	1964 Olympics qualification	1964.06.10	Geneva (SUI)
143	Great Britain	97	67	+30	Nino Buscató	20	1964 Olympics qualification	1964.06.08	Geneva (SUI)
142	France	66	93	-27	Emiliano Rodríguez	20	1964 Olympics qualification	1964.06.07	Geneva (SUI)
141	Luxembourg	88	58	+30	Natalio Ibarra	30	1964 Olympics qualification	1964.06.05	Geneva (SUI)
140	Netherlands	85	80	+5	Alfonso Martínez	18	1964 Olympics qualification	1964.06.04	Geneva (SUI)
139	Belgium	86	83	+3	Emiliano Rodríguez	35	1963 EuroBasket CR	1963.10.13	Wroclaw (POL)
138	Bulgaria	70	102	-32	Emiliano Rodríguez	26	1963 EuroBasket CR	1963.10.12	Wroclaw (POL)
137	Soviet Union	64	106	-42	José Ramón Ramos	20	1963 EuroBasket 1R	1963.10.11	Wroclaw (POL)
136	Czechoslovakia	98	76	+22	Emiliano Rodríguez	28	1963 EuroBasket 1R	1963.10.10	Wroclaw (POL)
135	East Germany	85	91	-6	Emiliano Rodríguez	37	1963 EuroBasket 1R	1963.10.09	Wroclaw (POL)
134	Finland	79	83	-4	Carlos Sevillano	22	1963 EuroBasket 1R	1963.10.07	Wroclaw (POL)
133	France	86	70	+16	Nino Buscató	24	1963 EuroBasket 1R	1963.10.06	Wroclaw (POL)
132	Romania	75	70	+5	Emiliano Rodríguez	29	1963 EuroBasket 1R	1963.10.05	Wroclaw (POL)
131	Poland	76	79	-3	Nino Buscató	14	1963 EuroBasket 1R	1963.10.04	Wroclaw (POL)
130	Italy	91	97	-6	Emiliano Rodríguez	31	1963 Mediterranean Games MR	1963.09.28	Naples (ITA)
129	United Arab Republic	92	75	+17	Carlos Sevillano	31	1963 Mediterranean Games MR	1963.09.27	Naples (ITA)
128	Yugoslavia	83	72	+11	Emiliano Rodríguez	31	1963 Mediterranean Games MR	1963.09.24	Naples (ITA)
127	Lebanon	104	68	+36	Emiliano Rodríguez	22	1963 Mediterranean Games MR	1963.09.23	Naples (ITA)
126	Morocco	118	54	+64	Emiliano Rodríguez	31	1963 Mediterranean Games MR	1963.09.22	Naples (ITA)
125	Portugal	89	54	+35	Alfonso Martínez	29	1963 EuroBasket qualification	1963.05.11	Madrid
124	Libya	118	32	+86	Alfonso Martínez	23	1963 EuroBasket qualification	1963.05.09	Madrid
123	Puerto Rico	76	72	+4			1962 Friendly	1962.12.17	Taipei (TPE)
122	United States	63	112	-49			1962 Friendly	1962.12.16	Taipei (TPE)
121	Philippines	70	58	+12			1962 Friendly	1962.12.15	Taipei (TPE)
120	Formosa	70	58	+12			1962 Friendly	1962.12.14	Taipei (TPE)
119	Australia	86	71	+15			1962 Friendly	1962.12.11	Manila (PHI)
118	Philippines	82	77	+5			1962 Friendly	1962.12.09	Manila (PHI)
117	Formosa	86	62	+24			1962 Friendly	1962.12.07	Manila (PHI)
116	Canada	57	61	-4			1962 Friendly	1962.12.06	Manila (PHI)
115	United States	73	90	-17			1962 Friendly	1962.12.02	Manila (PHI)
114	Puerto Rico	56	65	-9			1962 Friendly	1962.12.01	Manila (PHI)
113	Argentina	76	69	+7			1962 Friendly	1962.05.31	Madrid
112	Argentina	74	62	+12			1962 Friendly	1962.05.30	Barcelona
111	Netherlands	75	64	+11			1962 Friendly	1962.03.20	Amsterdam (NED)
110	Netherlands	88	78	+10			1962 Friendly	1962.03.19	Rotterdam (NED)
109	Belgium	79	78	+1			1962 Friendly	1962.03.17	Brussels (BEL)
108	Belgium	61	71	-10			1962 Friendly	1962.03.16	Courtrai (BEL)
107	Finland	61	60	+1	Emiliano Rodríguez	28	1961 EuroBasket CR	1961.05.07	Belgrade (SRB)
106	West Germany	62	49	+13	Emiliano Rodríguez	14	1961 EuroBasket CR	1961.05.05	Belgrade (SRB)
105	Finland	99	53	+46	Emiliano Rodríguez	23	1961 EuroBasket CR	1961.05.04	Belgrade (SRB)
104	England	99	50	+49	Emiliano Rodríguez	20	1961 EuroBasket CR	1961.05.03	Belgrade (SRB)
103	Greece	73	46	+27	N.Buscató, E.Rodríguez	20	1961 EuroBasket CR	1961.05.02	Belgrade (SRB)
102	Soviet Union	49	82	-33	Emiliano Rodríguez	15	1961 EuroBasket 1R	1961.05.01	Belgrade (SRB)
101	Belgium	67	70	-3	Santiago Navarro	22	1961 EuroBasket 1R	1961.04.30	Belgrade (SRB)
100	Belgium	63	56	+7	Jesús Codina	12	1961 Friendly	1961.03.19	Madrid
99	Belgium	54	46	+8	Alfonso Martínez	10	1961 Friendly	1961.03.18	Barcelona
98	Puerto Rico	65	75	-10	Alfonso Martínez	21	1960 Olympics CR	1960.09.07	Rome (ITA)
97	Bulgaria	2	0	+2	walkover	n/a	1960 Olympics CR	1960.09.05	Rome (ITA)
96	Japan	66	64	+2	Emiliano Rodríguez	24	1960 Olympics CR	1960.09.03	Rome (ITA)
95	France	48	78	-30	Alfonso Martínez	24	1960 Olympics CR	1960.09.02	Rome (ITA)
94	Mexico	66	80	-14	Emiliano Rodríguez	21	1960 Olympics CR	1960.09.01	Rome (ITA)
93	Poland	63	75	-12	Emiliano Rodríguez	17	1960 Olympics PR	1960.08.29	Rome (ITA)
92	Philippines	82	84	-2	Josep Cortés	20	1960 Olympics PR	1960.08.27	Rome (ITA)
91	Uruguay	77	72	+5	Emiliano Rodríguez	18	1960 Olympics PR	1960.08.26	Rome (ITA)
90	United States	59	91	-32	Alfonso Martínez	18	1960 Friendly	1960.08.23	Lugano (SUI)
89	Canada	60	49	+11	Alfonso Martínez	19	1960 Olympics qualification	1960.08.19	Bologna (ITA)
88	Belgium	81	71	+10	Emiliano Rodríguez	33	1960 Olympics qualification	1960.08.18	Bologna (ITA)
87	Suriname	77	54	+23	Emiliano Rodríguez	15	1960 Olympics qualification	1960.08.16	Bologna (ITA)
86	Czechoslovakia	52	64	-12	Emiliano Rodríguez	13	1960 Olympics qualification	1960.08.15	Bologna (ITA)
85	Sudan	88	40	+48	Alfonso Martínez	19	1960 Olympics qualification	1960.08.14	Bologna (ITA)
84	Formosa	83	55	+28	Emiliano Rodríguez	29	1960 Olympics qualification	1960.08.13	Bologna (ITA)
83	France	53	55	-2	Emiliano Rodríguez	17	1960 Friendly	1960.05.23	Madrid
82	Lebanon	69	72	-3	Emiliano Rodríguez	23	1959 Mediterranean Games MR	1959.10.22	Beirut (LBN)
81	Tunisia	92	31	+61	Nino Buscató	26	1959 Mediterranean Games MR	1959.10.20	Beirut (LBN)
80	Yugoslavia	60	69	-9	Emiliano Rodríguez	15	1959 Mediterranean Games MR	1959.10.18	Beirut (LBN)
79	United Arab Republic	54	48	+6	Emiliano Rodríguez	20	1959 Mediterranean Games MR	1959.10.17	Beirut (LBN)
78	Turkey	53	41	+12	Emiliano Rodríguez	15	1959 Mediterranean Games MR	1959.10.16	Beirut (LBN)
77	Iran	71	42	+29	Jorge Parra	20	1959 EuroBasket CR	1959.05.31	Istanbul (TUR)
76	Austria	64	33	+31	Emiliano Rodríguez	14	1959 EuroBasket CR	1959.05.29	Istanbul (TUR)
75	Italy	45	65	-20	Alfonso Martínez	10	1959 EuroBasket CR	1959.05.28	Istanbul (TUR)
74	Turkey	50	53	-3	F.Capel, A.Martínez	12	1959 EuroBasket CR	1959.05.26	Istanbul (TUR)
73	Poland	58	61	-3	Alfonso Martínez	22	1959 EuroBasket 1R	1959.05.25	Istanbul (TUR)
72	Finland	57	43	+14	Emiliano Rodríguez	19	1959 EuroBasket 1R	1959.05.23	Istanbul (TUR)
71	Czechoslovakia	62	85	-23	Emiliano Rodríguez	15	1959 EuroBasket 1R	1959.05.22	Istanbul (TUR)
70	France	59	61	-2			1959 Friendly	1959.04.08	Bordeaux (FRA)
69	Belgium	56	69	-13			1959 Friendly	1959.04.04	Brussels (BEL)
68	Netherlands	67	62	+5			1959 Friendly	1959.04.01	Amsterdam (NED)
67	Italy	57	59	-2			1959 Friendly	1959.03.29	Naples (ITA)
66	Portugal	68	34	+34			1959 Friendly	1959.03.22	Madrid
65	Switzerland	69	42	+27			1958 Friendly	1958.04.13	Huesca
64	France	50	59	-9			1958 Friendly	1958.04.06	Barcelona
63	Portugal	46	38	+8			1958 Friendly	1958.03.29	Oporto (POR)
62	Belgium	64	48	+16			1958 Friendly	1958.03.23	Barcelona
61	Bulgaria	39	51	-12			1958 Friendly	1958.02.16	Barcelona
60	Switzerland	52	39	+13			1957 Friendly	1957.05.28	Geneva (SUI)
59	Italy	59	57	+2			1957 Friendly	1957.03.24	Barcelona
58	Austria	62	58	+4			1957 Friendly	1957.03.19	Viena (AUT)
57	France	45	61	-16			1957 Friendly	1957.03.16	Paris (FRA)
56	Belgium	57	47	+10			1957 Friendly	1957.03.13	Brussels (BEL)
55	Portugal	101	58	+43			1957 Friendly	1957.03.10	Madrid
54	Belgium	87	62	+25			1956 Friendly	1956.02.12	Barcelona
53	England	55	53	+2			1956 Friendly	1956.02.07	London (ENG)
52	Portugal	70	55	+15			1956 Friendly	1956.02.04	Lisboa (POR)
51	Egypt	61	55	+6	Jorge Bonareu	14	1955 Mediterranean Games MR	1955.07.24	Barcelona
50	Greece	58	57	+1	Jorge Bonareu	20	1955 Mediterranean Games MR	1955.07.23	Barcelona
49	Italy	101	89	+12	Jorge Bonareu	42	1955 Mediterranean Games MR	1955.07.22	Barcelona
48	Greece	59	53	+6	Joaquín Hernández	25	1955 Mediterranean Games MR	1955.07.20	Barcelona
47	France	61	64	-3	Joaquín Hernández	19	1955 Mediterranean Games MR	1955.07.19	Barcelona
46	Lebanon	76	64	+12	Joaquín Hernández	14	1955 Mediterranean Games MR	1955.07.18	Barcelona
45	Switzerland	60	48	+12			1955 Friendly	1955.03.08	Lausanne (SUI)
44	Belgium	43	54	-11			1955 Friendly	1955.03.05	Liège (BEL)
43	Netherlands	86	51	+35			1955 Friendly	1955.03.02	Amsterdam (NED)
42	West Germany	54	47	+7			1955 Friendly	1955.02.26	Berlin (GER)
41	West Germany	59	45	+14			1954 Friendly	1954.10.31	Madrid
40	Italy	73	76	-3			1954 Friendly	1954.05.08	Bologna (ITA)
39	France	42	35	+7			1954 Friendly	1954.02.12	Madrid
38	Belgium	48	50	-2			1953 Friendly	1953.03.18	Bilbao
37	France	53	57	-4			1953 Friendly	1953.02.05	Paris (FRA)
36	Switzerland	86	72	+14			1953 Friendly	1953.02.01	Lleida
35	Italy	51	57	-6			1952 Friendly	1952.12.19	Madrid
34	Switzerland	46	26	+20			1952 Friendly	1952.06.24	Geneva (SUI)
33	France	55	68	-13			1952 Friendly	1952.03.09	Barcelona
32	Belgium	50	54	-4			1952 Friendly	1952.03.01	Brussels (BEL)
31	Egypt	39	41	-2	Guillermo Galíndez	12	1951 Mediterranean Games MR	1951.10.19	Alexandria (EGY)
30	Greece	49	47	+2	Guillermo Galíndez	17	1951 Mediterranean Games MR	1951.10.18	Alexandria (EGY)
29	Italy	52	47	+5	Pedro Borrás	21	1951 Mediterranean Games MR	1951.10.16	Alexandria (EGY)
28	Syria	60	44	+16	Guillermo Galíndez	25	1951 Mediterranean Games MR	1951.10.13	Alexandria (EGY)
27	Lebanon	58	34	+24	Guillermo Galíndez	26	1951 Mediterranean Games MR	1951.10.10	Alexandria (EGY)
26	Turkey	48	39	+9	Pedro Borrás	16	1951 Mediterranean Games MR	1951.10.08	Alexandria (EGY)
25	France	52	66	-14	Guillermo Galíndez	26	1951 Friendly	1951.03.04	Paris (FRA)
24	Belgium	42	36	+6	D.Bárcenas, A.Imedio	10	1951 Friendly	1951.01.12	Madrid
23	Yugoslavia	2	0	+2	walkover	n/a	1950 World Cup CR	1950.11.03	Buenos Aires (ARG)
22	Ecuador	50	54	-4	Juan Dalmau	15	1950 World Cup CR	1950.11.01	Rosario (ARG)
21	Peru	37	43	-6	Álvaro Salvadores	13	1950 World Cup CR	1950.10.30	Mar de Plata (ARG)
20	Chile	40	54	-14	Álvaro Salvadores	20	1950 World Cup 1R	1950.10.26	Buenos Aires (ARG)
19	Egypt	56	57	-1	Eduardo Kucharski	26	1950 World Cup 1R	1950.10.25	Buenos Aires (ARG)
18	France	46	31	+15	Guillermo Galíndez	18	1950 Friendly	1950.02.03	Madrid
17	Italy	36	44	-8	Pedro Borrás	11	1950 World Cup qualification	1950.01.08	Nice (FRA)
16	Belgium	45	44	+1	Eduardo Kucharski	14	1950 World Cup qualification	1950.01.07	Nice (FRA)
15	Italy	35	41	-6	Pedro Borrás	14	1950 World Cup qualification	1950.01.05	Nice (FRA)
14	Austria	76	18	+58	Juan Dalmau	23	1950 World Cup qualification	1950.01.04	Nice (FRA)
13	Finland	53	26	+27	Andrés Oller	17	1950 World Cup qualification	1950.01.03	Nice (FRA)
12	Portugal	63	36	+27	Eduardo Kucharski	20	1949 Friendly	1949.05.22	Tetuan
11	France	40	43	-3	Guillermo Galíndez	14	1949 Friendly	1949.03.03	Paris (FRA)
10	France	34	40	-6	Joan Ferrando	9	1948 Friendly	1948.05.07	Madrid
9	Portugal	52	27	+25	Eduardo Kucharski	21	1948 Friendly	1948.05.03	Lisboa (POR)
8	Portugal	37	28	+9	Eduardo Kucharski	16	1947 Friendly	1947.05.14	Madrid
7	France	24	25	-1	Eduardo Kucharski	9	1943 Friendly	1943.03.07	Toulouse (FRA)
4	Latvia	18	24	-6	Rafael Martín	6	1935 EuroBasket F	1935.05.04	Geneva (SUI)
3	Czechoslovakia	21	17	+4	Rafael Martín	10	1935 EuroBasket SF	1935.05.03	Geneva (SUI)
2	Belgium	25	17	+8	Pedro Alonso	8	1935 EuroBasket 1R	1935.05.02	Geneva (SUI)
1	Portugal	33	12	+21	Rafael Ruano	10	1935 EuroBasket qualification	1935.04.15	Madrid

== See also ==
- Spain national basketball team
- Spain national basketball team head to head
- Spanish Basketball Federation
- Spain national youth basketball teams
- Basketball at the Summer Olympics
- FIBA Basketball World Cup
- FIBA EuroBasket
