= List of foreign-born players in Spanish men's national basketball team =

Complete list of all foreign-born players who, despite having been born abroad, have represented Spain men's national basketball team in international competition since 1935. Some of them were born to Spanish parents abroad, some moved to Spain at a young age, and some others were "naturalized" or acquired citizenship after playing professionally in a Spanish club.

Up to 4 players born in Latin America were in the Spanish squad for the first EuroBasket in 1935. Spain won the silver medal: brothers Emilio and Pedro Alonso, Rafael Martín and Rafael Ruano. Two Americans were key factors in the modernization of the sport in Spain in the late 60s and the 70s, Wayne Brabender and Clifford Luyk, with the silver medal at the 1973 EuroBasket as their highest success. Two more Latin Americans were included in the 1980s, Argentinian Juan Domingo de la Cruz and Dominican Chicho Sibilio.

Modern FIBA regulations about the Eligibility and National Status of Players limit the number of naturalized players to one per squad:

"A national team participating in a Competition of FIBA may have only one player on its team who has acquired the legal nationality of that country by naturalisation or by any other means after having reached the age of sixteen" (Book 3, Chapter 1, Article 21.a)

In recent years, this regulation on a team's roster has avoided the inclusion of Serge Ibaka and Nikola Mirotić at the same time

== List of players ==
Note: list updated to senior team call-up in September 2019. Players in bold are still active at international level.

Birthplace	Player	Years	Caps	Pts.	Pos.	Final Tournaments	Notes
(Cuba) La Habana	Emilio Alonso	1935, 1943-49	9	29	Small Forward	1935 EuroBasket	Born in Cuba to Basque parents. Pedro Alonso's brother.
(Cuba) La Habana	Pedro Alonso	1935, 1943	5	16	Small Forward	1935 EuroBasket	Born in Cuba to Basque parents. Emilio Alonso's brother.
El Salvador	Rafael Martín	1935	4	24	Small Forward	1935 EuroBasket (MVP)	Of Salvadoran nationality, he was studying in Madrid at the time. Some sources list him as Costa Rican.
Costa Rica	Rafael Ruano	1935	4	16	Center	1935 EuroBasket	Born in Costa Rica, exact location unknown.
(Puerto Rico) Guánica	Freddy Borrás	1949-1954	22	245	Small Forward	(silver) 1951 Mediterranean Games	Born in Puerto Rico. Arrived to Spain on a student visa to avoid being drafted in the Korean War. Player (1948-1949) and player-coach (1949-1954) at Real Madrid. National head coach in 1952. He introduced the Jump shot in Spain.
Puerto Rico	Guillermo Galíndez	1949-1954	24	377		(silver) 1951 Mediterranean Games	Born in Puerto Rico. Arrived to Spain on a student visa.
Venezuela	Juan Bautista Urberuaga	1964-1965	9	0	Small Forward	11th 1965 EuroBasket	
(United States) Syracuse, New York	Clifford Luyk	1966-1976	150	2021	Power Forward / Center	7th 1968 Summer Olympics; 5th 1969 EuroBasket; 7th 1971 EuroBasket; 11th 1972 Summer Olympics; 1973 EuroBasket; 5th 1974 World Championship; 4th 1975 EuroBasket	Brought to Spain by coach Pedro Ferrándiz, who convinced him not to wait for the New York Knicks. Regarded as a key figure in the modernization of Spanish basketball. Naturalized in 1965, sped by the intervention of Raimundo Saporta.
(United States) Montevideo, Minnesota	Wayne Brabender	1969-1982	190	2861	Small Forward	7th 1971 EuroBasket; 11th 1972 Summer Olympics; 1973 EuroBasket (MVP); 5th 1974 World Championship; 4th 1975 EuroBasket; 9th 1977 EuroBasket; 6th 1979 EuroBasket; 4th 1980 Summer Olympics; 4th 1981 EuroBasket; 4th 1982 World Championship	Brought to Spain by coach Pedro Ferrándiz, despite being drafted in 1967 by the Philadelphia Warriors. His quick naturalization in 1968 was a scandal in Spain.
(Argentina) Buenos Aires	José Luis Beltrán	1975-1976	17	58	Center	4th 1975 Mediterranean Games	Born to Spanish parents on a business trip to Argentina, moved back to Spain when he was 4.
(Argentina) Pasteur, Buenos Aires	Juan Domingo de la Cruz	1977-1986	131	1012	Center	9th 1977 EuroBasket; 6th 1979 EuroBasket; 4th 1980 Summer Olympics; 4th 1981 EuroBasket; 4th 1982 World Championship; 1983 EuroBasket; 1984 Summer Olympics; 4th 1985 EuroBasket; 5th 1986 World Championship	(gold) at the 1973 South America U-17 Championship, with Argentina. Then signed for FC Barcelona (1975-1987).
(Venezuela) Maracaibo	José Luis "Indio" Díaz	1980, 1988-89	18	101	Small Forward	(silver) 1978 U-18 Europe	Born in Venezuela to Spanish parents, raised in Spain. Nicknamed "indio" after his birthplace.
(Dominican Republic) San Cristóbal	Chicho Sibilio	1980-1987	87	1324	Shooting Guard	4th 1980 Summer Olympics; 4th 1981 EuroBasket; 4th 1982 World Championship; 1983 EuroBasket; 4th 1985 EuroBasket; 5th 1986 World Championship; 4th 1987 EuroBasket	Born in the Dominican Republic, which he represented in the 1975 Centrobasket. Signed for FC Barcelona in 1976, playing first for the youth team. Naturalized in 1977.
(Soviet Union) (Russia) Moscow	José Biriukov	1988-1992	57	526	Shooting Guard	8th 1988 Summer Olympics; 5th 1989 Eurobasket; 9th 1992 Summer Olympics	Born in the Soviet Union ^{[A]} to a Russian father and a Basque mother (sent to Moscow as a child to flee the Civil War). He'd played 22 games for the Soviet Union, so had to wait 3 years to play for Spain.
(Germany) Durmersheim	Sivano Bustos	1990-1991	16	16	Center	1991 EuroBasket	Born in West Germany to Spanish parents.
(United States) New York, New York	Mike Smith	1995-1997	30	259	Small Forward	6th 1995 EuroBasket; 5th 1997 EuroBasket	Played professionally in Spain from 1986 to 2002. Naturalized while playing for Joventut Badalona in 1991, had to wait until 1995 to play for Spain.
(United States) Fullerton, California	Johnny Rogers	2000	16	103	Power Forward	9th 2000 Summer Olympics	Played in Spain, Italy and Greece (1988-2004). Married to a Spanish woman, citizenship in 1996.
(United States) Dudley, North Carolina	Chuck Kornegay	2001-2003	18	92	Center	2001 EuroBasket	He played for several Spanish clubs from 1998 to 2008. Naturalized in 2001.
(Venezuela) Caracas	Germán Gabriel	2002-03, 2013	20	47	Power Forward	(bronze) 1998 U-18 Europe; (gold) 1999 U-19 World Cup; (bronze) 2000 U-20 Europe; 2013 EuroBasket	Born in Venezuela, raised in Málaga, Spain.
(Republic of the Congo) Brazzaville	**Serge Ibaka**	2011-2014	50	437	Small Forward	2011 EuroBasket; 2012 Summer Olympics; 5th 2014 World Championship	Born and raised in the Republic of the Congo, played for the Congolese U-18 team the 2006 Africa U18. He played for two years in Spain in his late teens. Granted nationality in 2011, while playing for Oklahoma City Thunder. He cannot play alongside Nikola Mirotić.
(Socialist Federal Republic of Yugoslavia) (Montenegro) Podgorica (formerly Titograd)	**Nikola Mirotić**	2015-2016	30	372	Power Forward	(bronze) 2010 U-20 Europe; (gold) 2011 U-20 Europe (MVP); 2015 EuroBasket; 2016 Summer Olympics	Born in the SFR of Yugoslavia ^{[B]} and raised in modern-day Montenegro, he signed at 14 for Real Madrid in 2005, playing professionally 2008-2014. He cannot play alongside Serge Ibaka.
(Senegal) Dakar	**Ilimane Diop**	2016-	10	37	Center	(bronze) 2011 U-16 Europe; 4th 2012 U-17 World Cup; 5th 2012 U-18 Europe; (bronze) 2013 U-18 Europe; (silver) 2015 U-20 Europe	Born in Senegal, brought to Spain as a baby, received Spanish passport at 16. Won 3 medals in 5 youth tournaments with Spain.
Andorra la Vella	**Quino Colom**	2017-	29	214	Point Guard	(bronze) 2006 U-18 Europe (bronze) 2008 U-20 Europe 2019 World Cup	Won the 2004 Europe U-16 Division C with Andorra. He holds dual citizenship.

=== Notes ===
- ^{A} Soviet Union dissolved in December 1991 into 15 independent countries, Russia being one of them.
- ^{B} SFR Yugoslavia dissolved in 1992 into 5 independent countries, Bosnia and Herzegovina, Croatia, Macedonia, Slovenia, and the Federal Republic of Yugoslavia. FR Yugoslavia was renamed into Serbia and Montenegro in February 2003 and dissolved in June 2006 into two independent countries, Montenegro and Serbia.

== Other players ==
- Chilean-Spanish Álvaro Salvadores, born in Spain in 1928, whose family emigrated to Chile due to the Spanish Civil War (1936-1939). He took part in the first FIBA Basketball World Cup, hosted by Argentina in 1950, having offered himself to the Spanish Federation. He also competed in the 1952 Summer Olympics with Chile.
- Finnish-born Carlos Ruf, born in Hamina to a Finnish mother, raised in Barcelona. won the silver medal in the 1985 U-16 European Championship with Spain. He played for the Cadet, Junior and U-22 squads.
- American Brad Oleson acquired Spanish nationality in 2009, and was selected to the senior men's Spain national team training camp pre-squad for the 2010 FIBA World Championship.

== See also ==
- Spanish Basketball Federation
- Spain men's national basketball team
- Spain national youth basketball teams
- Medal winners in Spain national basketball team
