= Clifford Luyk =

Spanish basketball player

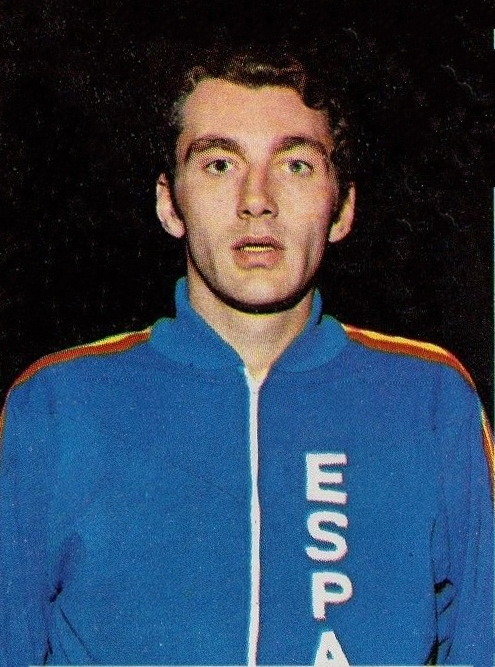
- Luyk in 1972

Personal information
- Born: June 28, 1941 (age 85) Syracuse, New York, U.S.
- Listed height: 6 ft 8 in (2.03 m)
- Listed weight: 198 lb (90 kg)

Career information
- High school: Vernon-Verona-Sherrill (Verona, New York)
- College: Florida (1959–1962)
- NBA draft: 1962: 4th round, 29th overall pick
- Drafted by: New York Knicks
- Playing career: 1962–1978
- Position: Power forward / center
- Number: 13
- Coaching career: 1978–1999

Career history

Playing
- 1962–1978: Real Madrid

Coaching
- 1983–1990: Real Madrid (assistant)
- 1990–1991: Atlético de Madrid Villalba
- 1991–1992: Juver Murcia
- 1992–1994: Real Madrid
- 1998–1999: Real Madrid

Career highlights
- As a player: 3× FIBA Intercontinental Cup champion (1976–1978); 6× EuroLeague champion (1964, 1965, 1967, 1968, 1974, 1978); 4× FIBA European Selection (1969–1972); 14× Spanish League champion (1963–1966, 1968–1977); 10× Spanish Cup winner (1965–1967, 1970–1975, 1977); Spanish League Top Scorer (1968); FIBA's 50 Greatest Players (1991); 50 Greatest EuroLeague Contributors (2008); Spanish Basketball Hall of Fame (2022); As head coach: FIBA Saporta Cup champion (1992); 2× Spanish League champion (1993, 1994); Spanish Cup winner (1993); As Assistant Coach: 3× Spanish League Champion (1984, 1985, 1986)
- Stats at Basketball Reference
Medals
Men's basketball
Representing Spain
FIBA EuroBasket
Silver medal – second place	1973 Spain

Clifford "Cliff" Luyk Diem (born June 28, 1941) is an American-born Spanish retired professional basketball player and coach, who played professionally in Spain and Europe from 1962 to 1978. He played college basketball for the University of Florida. He was drafted by the New York Knicks of the National Basketball Association (NBA), but never played a regular season game in the NBA. He signed with the Spanish professional team Real Madrid, helped Real Madrid become the dominant European basketball team of the 1960s, and is remembered for his trademark, old-school hook shot.

Luyk was named one of FIBA's 50 Greatest Players in 1991, and was chosen as one of the 50 most influential personalities to European club basketball over the previous half-century by the EuroLeague Basketball Experts Committee in 2008.

== Early years ==
Luyk was born in Syracuse, New York, to a Dutch-born father and a Swiss-born mother. He attended Vernon-Verona-Sherrill High School in Verona, New York, where the 6-foot, eight-inch Luyk became the star center for the VVS Red Devils high school basketball team. As a senior in 1957–58, he scored 488 points in 18 games for an average of 27.1 points per game.

== College career ==
Luyk enrolled in the University of Florida in Gainesville, Florida, where he played for coach John Mauer and coach Norm Sloan's Florida Gators basketball team from 1959 to 1962. In his three-year college career, he played in 66 games, scored 904 total points, and made 806 rebounds. During his 1961–62 senior season, he shot 49.3 percent from the floor, averaged 21.3 points per game, and led the Southeastern Conference (SEC) with 352 rebounds (15.3 per game). Memorably, Luyk scored 40 points against the Tennessee Volunteers and 36 points versus the Georgia Bulldogs. He was a second-team All-SEC selection in 1962.

== Professional career ==
=== Clubs ===
Luyk joined Real Madrid in 1962, and became a naturalized Spanish citizen three years later. He retired in 1978, having won six EuroLeague titles with Madrid's legendary club (1964, 1965, 1967, 1968, 1974 and 1978, despite not playing in the 1978 final). This record makes him unique: he is the only player who has won six EuroLeague titles as a player with the same team. Luyk also won 14 Spanish League championships, 10 Spanish Cups, and two FIBA Intercontinental Cups.

=== Spanish senior national team ===
As a member of the Spanish national team, Luyk won a silver medal in the EuroBasket 1973 with the Spanish national team. He also played at the 1968 Summer Olympic Games, EuroBasket 1969, EuroBasket 1971, the 1972 Summer Olympics, EuroBasket 1973, the 1974 FIBA World Championship, EuroBasket 1975, and the 1975 Mediterranean Games. In the 1972 Olympics, in a game against Germany, Luyk scored 31 points and grabbed 17 rebounds.

== Coaching career ==
Following his 1978 retirement as a player, Luyk became a basketball coach. From 1978 to 1981, he coached the Real Madrid junior team, and never lost a game. After that, he worked as a Real Madrid assistant coach, under head coach Lolo Sainz, for six seasons, from 1983 to 1989, and for another season under head coach George Karl, from 1989 to 1990. He returned to Real Madrid as head coach, from 1991 to 1994, and won two Spanish League championships, a FIBA Saporta Cup and a Spanish King's Cup. Coached by Luyk, Real Madrid lost to Limoges CSP in the 1993 EuroLeague Final Four. He again served as Real Madrid's head coach during the 1998–99 season, and has been a technical adviser to the club since 2009.

== Personal life ==
Luyk married Paquita Torres Pérez, a former Miss Spain (1966) and Miss Europe (1967), in 1970. Luyk and Torres had three children, one of whom, Sergio Luyk, played college basketball for St. John's University's Red Storm, and later played professionally for Real Madrid and other Spanish top level teams. Sergio died at 36, after a hard fight against cancer. Their daughter, Estefanía Luyk, is a professional model.
