= Wayne Brabender =

American-Spanish basketball player and coach

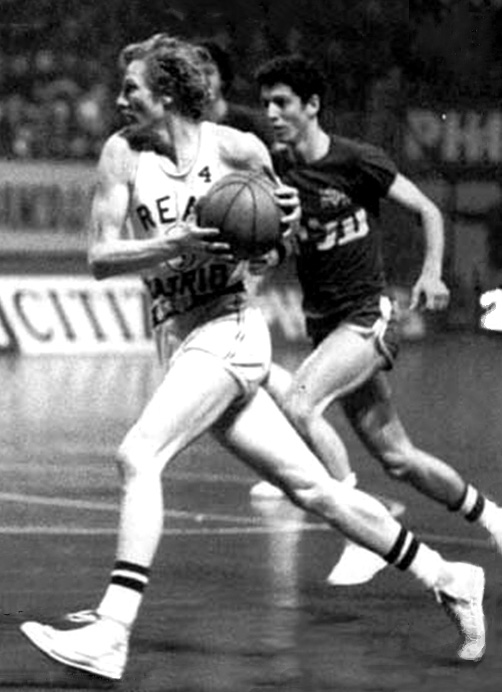
- Brabender (#4 in white)

Personal information
- Born: October 16, 1945 (age 81) Montevideo, Minnesota, U.S.
- Listed height: 6 ft 4 in (1.93 m)
- Listed weight: 225 lb (102 kg)

Career information
- High school: Milan (Milan, Minnesota)
- College: Ridgewater College (1963–1965); Minnesota–Morris (1965–1967)
- NBA draft: 1967: 14th round, 145th overall pick
- Drafted by: Philadelphia 76ers
- Playing career: 1967–1985
- Position: Shooting guard / small forward
- Number: 4, 14
- Coaching career: 1990–2004

Career history

Playing
- 1967–1983: Real Madrid
- 1983–1985: Caja Madrid

Coaching
- 1990–1991: Real Madrid
- 1991–1992: Gran Canaria
- 1994–1997: Valladolid
- 2004: CB Illescas

Career highlights
- As a player: 4× FIBA Intercontinental Cup champion (1976–1978, 1981); 4× EuroLeague champion (1968, 1974, 1978, 1980); 13× Spanish League champion (1968–1977, 1979, 1980, 1982); 7× Spanish Cup winner (1970–1975, 1977); 50 Greatest EuroLeague Contributors (2008); EuroBasket MVP (1973); 5× FIBA European Selection (1974–1976, 1979, 1980); FIBA's 50 Greatest Players (1991); 101 Greats of European Basketball (2018)
- Stats at Basketball Reference
Medals
Men's basketball
Representing Spain
FIBA EuroBasket
Silver medal – second place	1973 Spain

Wayne Donald Brabender Cole (born October 16, 1945) is an American-born Spanish retired professional basketball player and coach. He acquired Spanish citizenship in 1968, relinquishing his U.S. citizenship to qualify for the Spanish national team. At a height of 6 ft 4 in (1.93 m), he could play at either the shooting guard or small forward positions. He was named one of FIBA's 50 Greatest Players in 1991. On February 3, 2008, Brabender was chosen as one of the 50 most influential personalities to European professional club basketball, over the previous half-century, by the EuroLeague Basketball Experts Committee. In 2018, he was named one of the 101 Greats of European Basketball.

== College career ==
Born in Montevideo, Minnesota, Brabender played college basketball at Willmar Junior College (now Ridgewater College) and the University of Minnesota Morris after a high school career at Milan High School.

== Club playing career ==
Brabender was drafted by the Philadelphia 76ers in the 14th round (145th overall) of the 1967 NBA draft, though he never played in the NBA. Brabender came to Spain in order to gain experience, and he ended up contributing to four EuroLeague titles won by Real Madrid in 1968, 1974, 1978, and 1980. With Real Madrid, he also won 13 Spanish League championships, 7 Spanish Cups, and 4 Intercontinental Cups.

== National team playing career ==
Brabender played for the senior men's Spain national basketball team, and he won the silver medal at the EuroBasket 1973, where he was also named the MVP of the tournament. He also played at the EuroBasket 1971, the 1972 Summer Olympic Games, the 1974 FIBA World Championship, EuroBasket 1975, the 1975 Mediterranean Games, EuroBasket 1977, EuroBasket 1979, the 1980 Summer Olympic Games (where Spain achieved 4th place), EuroBasket 1981, and the 1982 FIBA World Championship.

== See also ==
- List of former United States citizens who relinquished their nationality
