= 1992–93 FIBA European Championship Regular Season Group A =

Standings and Results for Group A of the Regular Season phase of the FIBA European Championship 1992–93 basketball tournament.

Main page: FIBA European Championship 1992–93

Key to colors
Top four places in each group advance to Playoff
Eliminated

Tiebreakers:

- Head-to-head record in matches between the tied clubs
- Overall point difference in games between the tied clubs
- Overall point difference in all group matches (first tiebreaker if tied clubs are not in the same group)
- Points scored in all group matches
- Sum of quotients of points scored and points allowed in each group match

== Standings ==
	Team	Pld	W	L	PF	PA	Diff
1.	(Greece) PAOK	12	8	4	879	839	+40
2.	(France) Limoges	12	7	5	816	757	+59
3.	(Italy) Scavolini Pesaro	12	7	5	887	877	+10
4.	(Italy) Knorr Bologna	12	6	6	938	893	+45
5.	(Spain) Joventut Marbella	12	6	6	945	946	−1
6.	(Croatia) Cibona	12	5	7	909	976	−67
7.	(Israel) Maccabi Tel Aviv	12	3	9	934	1020	−86
8.	(Federal Republic of Yugoslavia) Partizan**	0	0	0	0	0	0

Notes:

- Limoges win the tiebreaker over Scavolini Pesaro for second place and the home advantage in the quarterfinals.
- Knorr Bologna win the tiebreaker over Joventut Marbella for fourth place and a playoff berth. The two teams split their group matches, but Knorr scored 2 more points head-to-head.

== Fixtures and results ==
=== Game 1 ===
October 29, 1992

October 29
20:00

(Report)

Cibona (Croatia)	82–66	(Italy) Knorr Bologna
Scoring by quarter: 44-29, 38-37
Pts: Radulović 21; Rebs: Arapović 18; Asts: Radulović, Alanović 2		Pts: Binelli 15; Rebs: Binelli 6 Asts: Danilović 2

Cibona Sports Center, Zagreb
Attendance: 6,000

October 29
20:30

(Report)

Scavolini Pesaro (Italy)	80–70	(Greece) PAOK
Scoring by quarter: 40-42, 40-28
Pts: P. Myers 20; Rebs: Boni 7 Asts: P. Myers 3		Pts: Levingston 19; Rebs: Levingston 12; Asts: Korfas 3

Palestra di Baia Flaminia, Pesaro
Attendance: 4,400

October 29
20:30

(Report)

Maccabi Tel Aviv (Israel)	87–82	(Spain) Joventut Badalona
Scoring by quarter: 44-41, 43-41
Pts: Ancrum, Jamchi 27; Rebs: Goodes, King, Curtis 5 Asts: Ancrum, Jamchi, Goodes 3		Pts: Thompson 21; Rebs: Thompson 9 Asts: R. Jofresa 3

Yad Eliyahu Arena, Tel Aviv
Attendance: 8,000

=== Game 2 ===
November 5, 1992

November 5
20:00

(Report)

PAOK (Greece)	67–57	(France) Limoges CSP
Scoring by quarter: 33-30, 34-27
Pts: Prelević 23; Rebs: Fasoulas 8 Asts: Korfas 5		Pts: Young 20; Rebs: Bilba 8 Asts: Zdovc 4

Alexandrio Melathron, Thessaloniki
Attendance: 3,000

November 5
20:30

(Report)

Knorr Bologna (Italy)	71–73	(Italy) Scavolini Pesaro
Scoring by quarter: 38-29, 33-44
Pts: Moretti 14; Rebs: Binelli 14; Asts: Coldebella, Brunamonti 2		Pts: P. Myers 20; Rebs: P. Myers 10; Asts: Workman 2

PalaDozza, Bologna
Attendance: 6,240

November 5
21:45

(Report)

Joventut Badalona (Spain)	86–82	(Croatia) Cibona
Scoring by quarter: 40-43, 46-39
Pts: Pressley 27; Rebs: Thompson 9 Asts: Pressley, Thompson, T. Jofresa 4		Pts: Radulović 25; Rebs: Sobin 12; Asts: Alanović 7

Palau Municipal, Badalona
Attendance: 8,400

=== Game 3 ===
November 26, 1992

November 26
20:30

(Report)

Scavolini Pesaro (Italy)	81–80	(Spain) Joventut Badalona
Scoring by quarter: 37-41, 44-39
Pts: Workman 25; Rebs: P. Myers 12; Asts: Workman 2		Pts: Pressley 28; Rebs: Thompson 14; Asts: Villacampa 2

Palestra di Baia Flaminia, Pesaro
Attendance: 5,000

November 26
20:30

(Report)

Limoges CSP (France)	63–76	(Italy) Knorr Bologna
Scoring by quarter: 38-34, 25-42
Pts: Zdovc 17; Rebs: Zdovc 8 Asts: Zdovc 7		Pts: Coldebella 19; Rebs: Binelli 8 Asts: Brunamonti 5

Palais des Sports de Beaublanc, Limoges
Attendance: 6,000

November 26
20:30

(Report)

Maccabi Tel Aviv (Israel)	89–110	(Croatia) Cibona
Scoring by quarter: 41-57, 48-53
Pts: Ancrum 27; Rebs: Jamchi 5 Asts: Daniel 6		Pts: Radulović 35; Rebs: Arapović 12; Asts: Arapović, Marić 2

Yad Eliyahu Arena, Tel Aviv
Attendance: 7,000

=== Game 4 ===
December 3, 1992

December 3
20:00

(Report)

Cibona (Croatia)	76–75	(Italy) Scavolini Pesaro
Scoring by quarter: 38-38, 38-37
Pts: Radulović 23; Rebs: Sobin 9 Asts: Sobin, Marić, Mršić 3		Pts: C. Myers 21; Rebs: Workman, P. Myers, Magnifico, Boni, Zampolini, Gracis 3 Asts: P. Myers 5

Cibona Sports Center, Zagreb
Attendance: 5,500

December 3
20:30

(Report)

Joventut Badalona (Spain)	62–78	(France) Limoges CSP
Scoring by quarter: 29-39, 33-39
Pts: Martínez 21; Rebs: Pressley 11; Asts: Villacampa 3		Pts: Young 31; Rebs: Young 11; Asts: Young, Zdovc 3

Palau Municipal, Badalona
Attendance: 3,500

December 3
21:00

(Report)

Maccabi Tel Aviv (Israel)	85–81	(Greece) PAOK
Scoring by quarter: 41-36, 44-45
Pts: Jamchi 24; Rebs: Henefeld 9 Asts: Henefeld, King 3		Pts: Prelević 29; Rebs: Levingston 12; Asts: Prelević 3

Yad Eliyahu Arena, Tel Aviv
Attendance: 7,000

=== Game 5 ===
December 10, 1992

December 10
20:00

(Report)

Knorr Bologna (Italy)	64–75	(Greece) PAOK
Scoring by quarter: 32-36, 32-39

PalaDozza, Bologna
Attendance: 6,070

December 10
20:30

(Report)

Limoges CSP (France)	83–52	(Croatia) Cibona
Scoring by quarter: 43-27, 40-25

Palais des Sports de Beaublanc, Limoges
Attendance: 5,000

December 10
20:30

(Report)

Scavolini Pesaro (Italy)	90–70	(Israel) Maccabi Tel Aviv
Scoring by quarter: 48-37, 42-33

Palestra di Baia Flaminia, Pesaro
Attendance: 4,500

=== Game 6 ===
December 17, 1992

December 17
20:30

(Report)

Maccabi Tel Aviv (Israel)	80–82	(Italy) Knorr Bologna
Scoring by quarter: 47-37, 33-45

Yad Eliyahu Arena, Tel Aviv
Attendance: 6,000

December 17
20:30

(Report)

Scavolini Pesaro (Italy)	61–76	(France) Limoges CSP
Scoring by quarter: 23-39, 38-37

Palestra di Baia Flaminia, Pesaro
Attendance: 4,000

December 17
21:45

(Report)

PAOK (Greece)	83–81	(Spain) Joventut Badalona
Scoring by quarter: 49-40, 34-41

Alexandrio Melathron, Thessaloniki
Attendance: 6,500

=== Game 7 ===
January 6–7, 1993

January 6
20:00

(Report)

Cibona (Croatia)	71–82	(Greece) PAOK
Scoring by quarter: 35-43, 36-39

Cibona Sports Center, Zagreb
Attendance: 4,000

January 7
20:30

(Report)

Knorr Bologna (Italy)	95–85	(Spain) Joventut Badalona
Scoring by quarter: 55-44, 40-41

PalaDozza, Bologna
Attendance: 5,000

January 7
20:30

(Report)

Limoges CSP (France)	75–63	(Israel) Maccabi Tel Aviv
Scoring by quarter: 49-31, 26-32

Palais des Sports de Beaublanc, Limoges
Attendance: 6,000

=== Game 8 ===
January 14, 1993

January 14
20:00

(Report)

Knorr Bologna (Italy)	109–69	(Croatia) Cibona
Scoring by quarter: 56-32, 53-37

PalaDozza, Bologna
Attendance: 6,258

January 14
20:30

(Report)

Joventut Badalona (Spain)	82–80	(Israel) Maccabi Tel Aviv
Scoring by quarter: 45-35, 37-45

Palau Municipal, Badalona
Attendance: 6,800

January 14
21:45

(Report)

PAOK (Greece)	69–65 (OT)	(Italy) Scavolini Pesaro
Scoring by quarter: 28-31, 24-21, Overtime: 5-5, 12-8

Alexandrio Melathron, Thessaloniki
Attendance: 6,500

=== Game 9 ===
January 20–21, 1993

January 20
20:30

(Report)

Limoges CSP (France)	60–58	(Greece) PAOK
Scoring by quarter: 35-32, 25-26

Palais des Sports de Beaublanc, Limoges
Attendance: 6,500

January 21
18:00

(Report)

Cibona (Croatia)	84–81	(Spain) Joventut Badalona
Scoring by quarter: 38-42, 46-39

Cibona Sports Center, Zagreb
Attendance: 3,200

January 21
20:30

(Report)

Scavolini Pesaro (Italy)	83–80	(Italy) Knorr Bologna
Scoring by quarter: 51-42, 32-38

Palestra di Baia Flaminia, Pesaro
Attendance: 4,500

=== Game 10 ===
January 28, 1993

January 28
20:00

(Report)

Cibona (Croatia)	90–88	(Israel) Maccabi Tel Aviv
Scoring by quarter: 52-42, 38-46

Cibona Sports Center, Zagreb
Attendance: 4,000

January 28
20:00

(Report)

Knorr Bologna (Italy)	70–67	(France) Limoges CSP
Scoring by quarter: 34-36, 36-31

PalaDozza, Bologna
Attendance: 6,177

January 28
20:30

(Report)

Joventut Badalona (Spain)	68–67	(Italy) Scavolini Pesaro
Scoring by quarter: 33-33, 35-34

Palau Municipal, Badalona
Attendance: 8,000

=== Game 11 ===
February 4, 1993

February 4
20:30

(Report)

Scavolini Pesaro (Italy)	74–68	(Croatia) Cibona
'Scoring by quarter: 37-39, 37-29

Palestra di Baia Flaminia, Pesaro
Attendance: 4,400

February 4
20:30

(Report)

Limoges CSP (France)	65–73	(Spain) Joventut Badalona
Scoring by quarter: 37-34, 28-39

Palais des Sports de Beaublanc, Limoges
Attendance: 5,500

February 4
21:35

(Report)

PAOK (Greece)	78–63	(Israel) Maccabi Tel Aviv
Scoring by quarter: 35-27, 43-36

Alexandrio Melathron, Thessaloniki
Attendance: 6,000

=== Game 12 ===
February 10–11, 1993

February 10
20:00

(Report)

Cibona (Croatia)	58–62	(France) Limoges CSP
Scoring by quarter: 29-38, 29-24

Cibona Sports Center, Zagreb
Attendance: 5,000

February 11
20:30

(Report)

Maccabi Tel Aviv (Israel)	88–91	(Italy) Scavolini Pesaro
Scoring by quarter: 53-55, 35-36

Yad Eliyahu Arena, Tel Aviv
Attendance: 4,000

February 11
21:45

(Report)

PAOK (Greece)	64–62	(Italy) Knorr Bologna
Scoring by quarter: 32-33, 32-29

Alexandrio Melathron, Thessaloniki
Attendance: 6,000

=== Game 13 ===
February 17–18, 1993

February 17
20:30

(Report)

Joventut Badalona (Spain)	84–71	(Greece) PAOK
'Scoring by quarter: 51-39, 33-32

Palau Municipal, Badalona
Attendance: 10,900

February 18
20:00

(Report)

Knorr Bologna (Italy)	90–71	(Israel) Maccabi Tel Aviv
Scoring by quarter: 47-34, 43-37

PalaDozza, Bologna
Attendance: 7,000

February 18
20:30

(Report)

Limoges CSP (France)	61–47	(Italy) Scavolini Pesaro
Scoring by quarter: 35-25, 26-22

Palais des Sports de Beaublanc, Limoges
Attendance: 7,000

=== Game 14 ===
February 25, 1993

February 25
20:30

(Report)

Maccabi Tel Aviv (Israel)	70–69	(France) Limoges CSP
Scoring by quarter: 46-37, 24-32

Yad Eliyahu Arena, Tel Aviv
Attendance: 5,000

February 25
20:30

(Report)

Joventut Badalona (Spain)	81–73	(Italy) Knorr Bologna
Scoring by quarter: 32-31, 49-42

Palau Municipal, Badalona
Attendance: 12,500

February 25
21:45

(Report)

PAOK (Greece)	81–67	(Croatia) Cibona
Scoring by quarter: 38-26, 43-41

Alexandrio Melathron, Thessaloniki
Attendance: 5,300
