= 1992 FIBA European League Final Four =

Tournament details
- Arena: Abdi İpekçi Arena; Istanbul, Turkey
- Dates: April 1992

Final positions
- Champions: (Socialist Federal Republic of Yugoslavia) Partizan (1st title)
- Runners-up: (Spain) Montigalà Joventut
- Third place: (Italy) Philips Milano
- Fourth place: (Spain) Estudiantes Argentaria

Awards and statistics
- MVP: (Socialist Federal Republic of Yugoslavia) Saša Danilović

The 1992 FIBA European League Final Four, or 1992 FIBA EuroLeague Final Four, was the 1991–92 season's FIBA European League Final Four tournament, organized by FIBA Europe.

Partizan won its first title, after defeating Montigalà Joventut in the final game, with a buzzer-beater by Saša Djordjević.

== Bracket ==
Semi-finals
(Socialist Federal Republic of Yugoslavia) Partizan	82
(Italy) Philips Milano	75
(Spain) Montigalà Joventut	91
(Spain) Estudiantes Argentaria	69

Final
(Socialist Federal Republic of Yugoslavia) Partizan	71
(Spain) Montigalà Joventut	70
Third place
(Italy) Philips Milano	99
(Spain) Estudiantes Argentaria	81

== Semifinals ==
=== Partizan - Philips Milano ===
14 April 1992
19:00

Boxscore

Partizan (Socialist Federal Republic of Yugoslavia)	82–75	(Italy) Philips Milano
Scoring by half: 31–35, 51–40
Pts: Danilović 22; Rebs: Danilović 10; Asts: Danilović 3		Pts: Dawkins 21; Rebs: Dawkins 19; Asts: Montecchi 6

Abdi İpekçi Arena, Istanbul
Attendance: 8,000
Referees: Costas Rigas (GRE), Philippe Leemann (SUI)

=== Montigalà Joventut - Estudiantes Argentaria ===
14 April 1992
21:00

Boxscore

Montigalà Joventut (Spain)	91–69	(Spain) Estudiantes Argentaria
Scoring by half: 51–36, 40–33
Pts: Villacampa 28; Rebs: Ruf 10; Asts: Pressley 3		Pts: Pinone 18; Rebs: Winslow 10; Asts: Azofra 3

Abdi İpekçi Arena, Istanbul
Attendance: 8,000
Referees: Wieslaw Zych (POL), Reuven Virovnik (ISR)

== Third place game ==
16 April 1992
19:00

Boxscore

Philips Milano (Italy)	99–81	(Spain) Estudiantes Argentaria
Scoring by half: 57–41, 42–40
Pts: Rogers 20; Rebs: Dawkins 9 Asts: Pittis 7		Pts: Winslow 21; Rebs: Winslow 9 Asts: three players 4

Abdi İpekçi Arena, Istanbul
Referees: Costas Rigas (GRE), Wieslaw Zych (POL)

== Final ==
16 April 1992
21:00

Boxscore

Partizan (Socialist Federal Republic of Yugoslavia)	71–70	(Spain) Montigalà Joventut
Scoring by half: 40-34, 31–36
Pts: Danilović 25; Rebs: Danilović, Dragutinović 5 Asts: Djordjević 3		Pts: Pressley 20; Rebs: Morales, Pressley 9 Asts: R. Jofresa, Thompson 2

Abdi İpekçi Arena, Istanbul
Attendance: 12,000
Referees: Reuven Virovnik (ISR), Philippe Leemann (SUI)

Partizan	Montigalà Joventut

Starters:			P	R	A
PG	4	(Socialist Federal Republic of Yugoslavia) Aleksandar Đorđević (C)	23	2	3
SG	5	(Socialist Federal Republic of Yugoslavia) Predrag Danilović	25	5	0
SF	15	(Socialist Federal Republic of Yugoslavia) Ivo Nakić	5	1	0
PF	8	(Socialist Federal Republic of Yugoslavia) Zoran Stevanović	6	4	1
C	13	(Socialist Federal Republic of Yugoslavia) Slaviša Koprivica	4	4	1
Reserves:			P	R	A
SF	6	(Socialist Federal Republic of Yugoslavia) Nikola Lončar	2	1	0
C	7	(Socialist Federal Republic of Yugoslavia) Mlađan Šilobad	4	3	1
C	11	(Socialist Federal Republic of Yugoslavia) Željko Rebrača	0	2	0
PG	14	(Socialist Federal Republic of Yugoslavia) Vladimir Dragutinović	2	5	2
Head coach:
(Socialist Federal Republic of Yugoslavia) Željko Obradović

1991–92 FIBA European League
Champions

Partizan
1st title

Starters:			P	R	A
PG	5	(Spain) Rafa Jofresa	8	1	2
SG	8	(Spain) Jordi Villacampa (C)	13	4	1
SF	11	(United States) Harold Pressley	20	9	1
PF	10	(United States) Corny Thompson	5	8	2
C	12	(Spain) Juan Antonio Morales	6	9	1
Reserves:			P	R	A
C	4	(Spain) Carlos Ruf	0	1	0
PG	6	(Spain) Tomàs Jofresa	18	6	1
SF	9	(Spain) Jordi Pardo	0	0	0
Head coach:
(Spain) Lolo Sainz

=== Final standings ===
	Team
1.	(Socialist Federal Republic of Yugoslavia) Partizan
2.	(Spain) Montigalà Joventut
3.	(Italy) Philips Milano
4.	(Spain) Estudiantes Argentaria

== Awards ==
=== FIBA European League Final Four MVP ===
- (Socialist Federal Republic of Yugoslavia) Predrag Danilović ( (Socialist Federal Republic of Yugoslavia) Partizan)

=== FIBA European League Finals Top Scorer ===
- (Socialist Federal Republic of Yugoslavia) Predrag Danilović ( (Socialist Federal Republic of Yugoslavia) Partizan)

=== FIBA European League All-Final Four Team ===
FIBA European League All-Final Four Team
Player	Team	Ref.
(Socialist Federal Republic of Yugoslavia) Saša Đorđević	Partizan	
(Socialist Federal Republic of Yugoslavia) Predrag Danilović (MVP)	Partizan	
(Spain) Jordi Villacampa	Montigalà Joventut	
(United States) Harold Pressley	Montigalà Joventut	
(Socialist Federal Republic of Yugoslavia) Slaviša Koprivica	Partizan	
