= 1994 FIBA European League Final Four =

Basketball competition

Tournament details
- Arena: Yad Eliyahu Arena; Tel Aviv, Israel
- Dates: April 1994

Final positions
- Champions: (Spain) 7up Joventut (1st title)
- Runners-up: (Greece) Olympiacos
- Third place: (Greece) Panathinaikos
- Fourth place: (Spain) FC Barcelona Banca Catalana

Awards and statistics
- MVP: (Federal Republic of Yugoslavia) Žarko Paspalj

The 1994 FIBA European League Final Four, or 1994 FIBA EuroLeague Final Four, was the 1993–94 season's FIBA European League Final Four tournament, organized by FIBA Europe.

7up Joventut won its first title, after defeating Olympiacos in the final game.

== Bracket ==
Semi-finals
(Greece) Olympiacos	77
(Greece) Panathinaikos	72
(Spain) 7up Joventut	79
(Spain) FCB Banca Catalana	65

Final
(Greece) Olympiacos	57
(Spain) 7up Joventut	59
Third place
(Greece) Panathinaikos	100
(Spain) FCB Banca Catalana	83

== Semifinals ==
=== Olympiacos – Panathinaikos ===
19 April 1994
19:30

Boxscore

Olympiacos (Greece)	77–72	(Greece) Panathinaikos
Scoring by half: 36–36, 41–36
Pts: Paspalj 22; Rebs: Tarpley 16; Asts: Tomić 2		Pts: Volkov 32; Rebs: Volkov, Vranković 8 Asts: Galis 2

Yad Eliyahu Arena, Tel Aviv
Referees: Stefano Cazzaro (ITA), Philippe Mailhabiau (FRA)

=== 7up Joventut – FC Barcelona Banca Catalana ===
19 April 1994
21:30

Boxscore

7up Joventut (Spain)	79–65	(Spain) FC Barcelona Banca Catalana
Scoring by half: 31–36, 48–29
Pts: T. Jofresa 21; Rebs: Martínez, Smith 16; Asts: Smith, Villacampa 1		Pts: Epi 23; Rebs: Roberts 7 Asts: three players 1

Yad Eliyahu Arena, Tel Aviv
Referees: Danko Radić (HRV), Reuven Virovnik (ISR)

== Third place game ==
21 April 1994
19:30

Boxscore

Panathinaikos (Greece)	100–83	(Spain) FC Barcelona Banca Catalana
Scoring by half: 54–49, 46–34
Pts: Galis 30; Rebs: Vranković 19; Asts: Galis, Vranković 3		Pts: Roberts 19; Rebs: Massenburg 10; Asts: Díez 2

Yad Eliyahu Arena, Tel Aviv
Referees: Danko Radić (HRV), Philippe Mailhabiau (FRA)

== Final ==
April 21
21:30

Boxscore

Olympiacos (Greece)	57–59	(Spain) 7up Joventut
Scoring by half: 39–39, 18–20
Pts: Paspalj 15; Rebs: Tarpley 14; Asts: Tomić 1		Pts: Martínez 17; Rebs: Martínez, Smith 10; Asts: Smith, Thompson 1

Yad Eliyahu Arena, Tel Aviv
Attendance: 8,000
Referees: Reuven Virovnik (ISR), Stefano Cazzaro (ITA)

Olympiacos	7up Joventut

Starters:			P	R	A
PG	4	(Greece) Efthimis Bakatsias	2	1	0
SG	5	(Greece) Georgios Sigalas	14	3	0
SF	8	(Federal Republic of Yugoslavia) Žarko Paspalj	15	6	0
PF	15	(United States) Roy Tarpley	12	14	0
C	10	(Greece) Panagiotis Fasoulas	2	10	0
Reserves:			P	R	A
PG	6	(Greece) Antonis Stamatis	0	0	0
PG	11	(Federal Republic of Yugoslavia) (Greece) Milan Tomić	10	1	1
C	14	(Federal Republic of Yugoslavia) (Greece) Dragan Tarlać	0	0	0
C	7	(Greece) Argyris Kampouris (C)	0	0	0
Head coach:
(Greece) Giannis Ioannidis

1993–94 FIBA European League
Champions

7up Joventut
1st title

Starters:			P	R	A
PG	5	(Spain) Rafa Jofresa	4	3	0
SG	8	(Spain) Jordi Villacampa (C)	16	4	0
SF	15	(Spain) Mike Smith	6	10	1
PF	10	(United States) Corny Thompson	9	4	1
C	13	(Spain) Ferran Martínez	17	10	0
Reserves:			P	R	A
PG	6	(Spain) Tomàs Jofresa	5	0	0
C	12	(Spain) Juan Antonio Morales	2	2	0
Head coach:
(Federal Republic of Yugoslavia) Željko Obradović

=== Final standings ===
	Team
1.	(Spain) 7up Joventut
2.	(Greece) Olympiacos
3.	(Greece) Panathinaikos
4.	(Spain) FC Barcelona Banca Catalana

== Awards ==
=== FIBA European League Final Four MVP ===
- (Federal Republic of Yugoslavia) Žarko Paspalj ( (Greece) Olympiacos)

=== FIBA European League Finals Top Scorer ===
- (Spain) Ferran Martínez ( (Spain) 7up Joventut)

=== FIBA European League All-Final Four Team ===
FIBA European League All-Final Four Team
Player	Team	Ref.
(Greece) Nikos Galis	Panathinaikos	
(Greece) Georgios Sigalas	Olympiacos	
(Spain) Jordi Villacampa	7up Joventut	
(Federal Republic of Yugoslavia) Žarko Paspalj (MVP)	Olympiacos	
(United States) Corny Thompson	7up Joventut	
