= ACB statistical leaders =

ACB statistical leaders are the season by season stats leaders and all-time stats leaders of the top-tier level professional basketball league in Spain, the Liga ACB, and its predecessor, the Liga Nacional Primera División.

== Liga Nacional Primera División and Liga ACB Top Scorers by season ==
In basketball, points are the sum of the score accumulated through free throws or field goals. The ACB's scoring title is awarded to the player with the highest points per game average in a given regular season.

Player nationality set by the player's national team affiliation.

Season	Top Scorer	Club	Scoring Average / Total Points
Liga Nacional Primera División (1957–1983)
1957	(Spain) Alfonso Martínez	Real Madrid	18.0
1958	(Spain) Alfonso Martínez (2×)	Real Madrid	17.2
1958–59	(Puerto Rico) Johnny Báez	Real Madrid	19.9
1959–60	(Spain) Alfonso Martínez (average) (3×) / (Puerto Rico) Johnny Báez (total points) (2×)	Barcelona / Real Madrid	20.2 / 439 points
1960–61	(Spain) Francisco Llobet	Orillo Verde	20.4
1961–62	(United States) Wayne Hightower	Real Madrid	19.7
1962–63	(Spain) Emiliano Rodríguez	Real Madrid	19.9
1963–64	(Spain) Emiliano Rodríguez (2×)	Real Madrid	22.7
1964–65	(Spain) Lorenzo Alocén	Helios	24.2
1965–66	(United States) Miles Aiken	Águilas Bilbao	23.9
1966–67	(Spain) Alfonso Martínez (4×)	Joventut	22.1
1967–68	(Spain) Clifford Luyk	Real Madrid	24.3
1968–69	(United States) Charles Thomas	San José Irpen	25.6
1969–70	(United States) Charles Thomas (2×)	San José Irpen	24.1
1970–71	(Spain) Alfredo Pérez Gómez	Breogán	27.1
1971–72	(Spain) Gonzalo Sagi-Vela	Estudiantes	21.6
1972–73	(Spain) Alfredo Pérez Gómez (2×)	Breogán	23.2
1973–74	(United States) John Coughran	YMCA	31.7
1974–75	(United States) Ray Price	Baskonia	32.2
1975–76	(United States) Walter Szczerbiak Sr. (average) / (United States) Bob Fullarton (total points)	Real Madrid / Breogán	30.9 / 968 points
1976–77	(United States) Bob Guyette	Barcelona	32.0
1977–78	(United States) Essie Hollis	Askatuak	41.0
1978–79	(United States) Nate Davis (average) / (United States) Webb Williams (total points)	Askatuak / Baskonia	34.5 / 730 points
1979–80	(United States) Nate Davis (2×)	Valladolid	29.7
1980–81	(Canada) Lars Hansen	OAR Ferrol	27.4
1981–82	(United States) Larry McNeill	Canarias	34.4
1982–83	(United States) Claude Gregory	Baskonia	30.6
Liga ACB (1983–present)
Season	Top Scorer	Club	Scoring Average
1983–84	(United States) Nate Davis (3×)	OAR Ferrol	28.2
1984–85	(United States) David Russell (average) / (United States) Nate Davis (total points) (4×)	Estudiantes / OAR Ferrol	31.7 / 822 points
1985–86	(United States) David Russell (2×)	Estudiantes	27.0
1986–87	(United States) Eddie Phillips	Canarias	32.6
1987–88	(United States) Kenny Simpson	Manresa	29.5
1988–89	(Socialist Federal Republic of Yugoslavia) Dražen Petrović	Real Madrid	28.0
1989–90	(United States) Ray Smith	Maristas Málaga	27.6
1990–91	(United States) Walter Berry	Atlético Madrid	32.9
1991–92	(United States) Jeff Lamp	Oximesa	29.0
1992–93	(Croatia) Velimir Perasović	Breogán	24.5
1993–94	(Brazil) Oscar Schmidt	Valladolid	33.3
1994–95	(United States) Darrell Armstrong	Ourense	24.6
1995–96	(United States) John Morton	Gran Canaria	26.3
1996–97	(United States) John Morton (2×)	Gran Canaria	23.6
1997–98	(United States) Tony White	Valladolid	21.2
1998–99	(Croatia) Velimir Perasović (2×)	Fuenlabrada	22.5
1999–00	(Croatia) Velimir Perasović (3×)	Fuenlabrada	22.4
2000–01	(Croatia) Velimir Perasović (4×)	Fuenlabrada	22.9
2001–02	(Croatia) Velimir Perasović (5×)	Fuenlabrada	22.4
2002–03	(Argentina) Walter Herrmann	Fuenlabrada	22.3
2003–04	(United States) Lou Roe	Lucentum	20.9
2004–05	(United States) Charlie Bell	Breogán	27.0
2005–06	(United States) Lou Roe (2×)	Sevilla	19.7
2006–07	(Spain) Juan Carlos Navarro	Barcelona	17.3
2007–08	(Spain) Rudy Fernández	Joventut	21.2
2008–09	(Serbia) Igor Rakočević	Baskonia	19.8
2009–10	(United States) Jaycee Carroll	Gran Canaria	19.1
2010–11	(United States) Jaycee Carroll (2×)	Gran Canaria	19.6
2011–12	(United States) Andy Panko	GBC	18.9
2012–13	(Canada) Carl English	Estudiantes	17.2
2013–14	(United States) Andy Panko (2×)	Fuenlabrada	17.9
2014–15	(United States) Andy Panko (3×)	Fuenlabrada	18.6
2015–16	(Bulgaria) Darius Adams	Baskonia	17.2
2016–17	(France) Edwin Jackson	Estudiantes	21.8
2017-18	(United States) Gary Neal	Zaragoza	20.6
2018–19	(Argentina) Nicolás Laprovíttola	Joventut	17.2
2019–20	(Slovenia) Klemen Prepelič	Joventut	22.3
2020–21	(Georgia (country)) Giorgi Shermadini	Canarias	17.0
2021–22	(Bosnia and Herzegovina) Džanan Musa	Breogán	20.1
2022–23	(Canada) Kassius Robertson	Obradoiro	17.4
2023–24	(United States) Markus Howard	Baskonia	19.4
2024–25	(United States) Jerrick Harding	Andorra	20.0
2025–26	(France) Timothé Luwawu-Cabarrot	Baskonia	18.7

=== Players with most top-scorer awards ===
Player	Awards	Editions
(Croatia) Velimir Perasović	5	1993, 1999-2002
(Spain) Alfonso Martínez	4	1957, 1958, 1960, 1967
(United States) Nate Davis	4	1979, 1980, 1984, 1985
(United States) Andy Panko	3	2012, 2014, 2015
(Spain) Emiliano Rodríguez	2	1963, 1964
(United States) Charles Thomas	2	1969, 1970
(Spain) Alfredo Pérez Gómez	2	1971, 1973
(United States) David Russell	2	1985, 1986
(United States) John Morton	2	1996, 1997
(United States) Lou Roe	2	2004, 2006
(United States) Jaycee Carroll	2	2010, 2011

== Liga ACB all-time games played leaders ==
Player nationality set by the player's national team affiliation. In bold, players active during the 2025–26 season.

As of 15 June 2026

Rank	Player	Games
1.	(Spain) Felipe Reyes	824
2.	(Spain) Rafa Jofresa	756
3.	(Spain) Ignacio Rodríguez	737
4.	(Brazil) **Marcelinho Huertas**	732
5.	(Spain) Nacho Azofra	705
6.	(Spain) **Sergio Llull**	696
7.	(Spain) Juan Carlos Navarro	689
8.	(Spain) Alex Mumbrú	677
9.	(Spain) Albert Oliver	675
10.	(Spain) Fran Vázquez	656
11.	(Spain) Alberto Herreros	654
12.	(Spain) Fernando San Emeterio	643
13.	(Spain) Carlos Jiménez	641
=	(Spain) Sergi Vidal	641
15.	(Spain) Rafa Martínez	629
16.	(Spain) Pablo Laso	624
17.	(Croatia) **Ante Tomić**	623
18.	(Spain) Juan Antonio Orenga	615
19.	(Spain) Carlos Montes	605
20.	(Spain) Berni Rodríguez	601
=	(Spain) José Miguel Antúnez	601

== Liga ACB all-time scoring leaders ==
Player nationality set by the player's national team affiliation. In bold, players during the 2025–26 ACB season. In gold, players with more than 6,000 points, considered by the ACB as historic players.

As of 15 June 2026:

Rank	Player	Games	Points Scored	Average
1.	(Spain) Alberto Herreros	654	9,759	14.92
2.	(Spain) Jordi Villacampa	506	8,991	17.77
3.	(United States) Brian Jackson	392	8,651	22.07
4.	(Spain) Felipe Reyes	824	8,332	10.11
5.	(Spain) Juan Carlos Navarro	689	8,318	12.07
6.	(United States) Granger Hall	433	8,039	18.57
7.	(Spain) Joan Creus	585	7,929	13.55
8.	(United States) Joe Arlauckas	365	7,543	20.67
9.	(Brazil) **Marcelinho Huertas**	732	7,460	10.19
10.	(Spain) Alex Mumbrú	677	7,435	10.98
11.	(Croatia) Velimir Perasović	354	7,387	20.87
12.	(Spain) Epi	422	7,029	16.66
13.	(Spain) **Sergio Llull**	696	7,014	10.07
14.	(Croatia) **Ante Tomić**	623	7,006	11.24
15.	(Spain) Darryl Middleton	398	6,425	16.14
16.	(United States) Andre Turner	378	6,405	16.94
17.	(Spain) Rafa Jofresa	756	6,327	8.37
18.	(United States) Richard Scott	350	6,199	17.71
19.	(United States) John Pinone	332	6,175	18.60
20.	(Spain) Bernard Hopkins	456	6,088	13.35

== Liga ACB all-time rebounding leaders ==
Player nationality set by the player's national team affiliation. In bold, players active during the 2025–26 ACB season. In gold, players with more than 2,500 rebounds, considered by the ACB as historic players.

As of 15 June 2026:

Rank	Player	Games	Rebounds	Average
1.	(Spain) Felipe Reyes	824	4,725	5.73
2.	(United States) Granger Hall	433	4,292	9.91
3.	(Croatia) **Ante Tomić**	623	3,806	6.10
4.	(Spain) Carlos Jiménez	641	3,526	5.50
5.	(United States) Claude Riley	308	3,033	9.85
6.	(Spain) Juan Antonio Orenga	616	2,933	4.77
7.	(Lithuania) Arvydas Sabonis	235	2,904	12.36
8.	(Spain) Fran Vázquez	656	2,842	4.33
9.	(Cape Verde) **Edy Tavares**	402	2,820	7.01
10.	(Spain) Bernard Hopkins	456	2,806	6.15
11.	(Spain) Mike Smith	405	2,755	6.80
12.	(United States) Larry Micheaux	269	2,729	10.14
13.	(Spain) Darryl Middleton	398	2,701	6.79
14.	(United States) Joe Arlauckas	365	2,626	7.19
15.	(Spain) Alex Mumbrú	677	2,499	3.68
16.	(United States) Harper Williams	346	2,493	7.21
17.	(Central African Republic) Anicet Lavodrama	345	2,429	7.04
18.	(Spain) Alfonso Reyes	461	2,417	5.24
19.	(Montenegro) Bojan Dubljević	429	2,378	5.54
20.	(Belgium) Axel Hervelle	473	2,355	4.98

== Liga ACB all-time assists leaders ==
Player nationality set by the player's national team affiliation. In bold, players active during the 2025–26 ACB season. In gold, players with more than 1,500 assists, considered by the ACB as historic players.

Stats through June 15, 2026:

Rank	Player	Games	Assists	Average
1.	(Brazil) **Marcelinho Huertas**	732	3,413	4.66
2.	(Spain) Pablo Laso	624	2,896	4.64
3.	(Spain) Nacho Azofra	705	2,224	3.15
4.	(Spain) **Sergio Llull**	696	2,085	3.00
5.	(Spain) Albert Oliver	675	2,070	3.07
6.	(Spain) Nacho Rodríguez	737	2,032	2.76
7.	(United States) Elmer Bennett	360	1,838	5.11
8.	(Spain) José Luis Llorente	474	1,768	3.73
9.	(United States) Andre Turner	378	1,748	4.62
10.	(Spain) Sergio Rodríguez	403	1,728	4.28
11.	(Argentina) Pablo Prigioni	461	1,721	3.73
12.	(United States) Omar Cook	319	1,704	5.34
13.	(Spain) Salva Díez	519	1,691	3.26
14.	(Spain) Javi Salgado	462	1,672	3.62
15.	(Spain) Juan Carlos Navarro	689	1,637	2.38
16.	(Spain) Rafa Jofresa	756	1,573	2.08
17.	(Argentina) **Facundo Campazzo**	320	1,496	4.68
18.	(Spain) Tomás Bellas	466	1,479	3.17
19.	(Spain) Joan Creus	585	1,461	2.50
20.	(Spain) Rodrigo San Miguel	527	1,445	2.74

== Liga ACB all-time steals leaders ==
Player nationality set by the player's national team affiliation. In gold, players with more than 750 steals, considered by the ACB as historic players.

Rank	Player	Games	Steals	Average
1.	(Spain) Pablo Laso	624	1,219	1.95
2.	(Spain) Nacho Rodríguez	737	1,145	1.55
3.	(Spain) Joan Creus	585	1,087	1.86
4.	(Spain) Rafa Jofresa	756	968	1.28
5.	(Spain) Carlos Jiménez	641	941	1.47
6.	(Spain) Salva Díez	519	937	1.81
7.	(Spain) Carlos Montes	605	900	1.49
8.	(United States) Andre Turner	378	840	2.22
9.	(Spain) Alberto Herreros	654	822	1.26
10.	(Spain) Jordi Villacampa	506	785	1.55
11.	(Spain) Nacho Azofra	705	784	1.11
12.	(Spain) Quim Costa	316	769	2.43
13.	(Argentina) Pablo Prigioni	458	767	1.66
14.	(Spain) José Ángel Arcega	582	767	1.32
15.	(Spain) José Luis Llorente	474	755	1.59
16.	(Spain) José Antonio Montero	466	751	1.61
17.	(Spain) Rudy Fernández	564	738	1.31
18.	(Spain) Felipe Reyes	824	734	0.89
19.	(Spain) José Miguel Antúnez	601	710	1.18
20.	(Spain) Alberto Angulo	542	702	1.30

== Liga ACB all-time blocks leaders ==
Player nationality set by the player's national team affiliation. In bold, players active during the 2025–26 ACB season. In gold, players with more than 600 blocked shots, considered by the ACB as historic players.

As of 15 June 2026:

Rank	Player	Games	Blocks	Average
1.	(Spain) Fran Vázquez	656	738	1.13
2.	(Cape Verde) **Edy Tavares**	402	729	1.81
3.	(Spain) Fernando Romay	416	671	1.61
4.	(United States) George Singleton	251	588	2.34
5.	(Lithuania) Arvydas Sabonis	235	528	2.25
6.	(Spain) Sitapha Savané	488	499	1.02
7.	(United States) Harper Williams	346	459	1.33
8.	(Spain) Derrick Alston	301	456	1.51
9.	(Central African Republic) Anicet Lavodrama	345	395	1.14
10.	(United States) Joe Arlauckas	365	375	1.03
11.	(Ukraine) **Artem Pustovyi**	315	350	1.11
12.	(United States) Granger Hall	433	348	0.80
13.	(France) Frederic Weis	293	346	1.18
14.	(United States) Brad Branson	280	333	1.19
15.	(Spain) Juan Antonio Morales	391	332	0.85
16.	(United States) Mike Phillips	191	329	1.72
17.	(United States) Kenny Green	136	327	2.40
18.	(Spain) Chuck Kornegay	283	327	1.16
19.	(Russia) Andrei Fetisov	123	323	2.63
20.	(United States) Lou Roe	273	317	1.16

== Liga ACB all-time made 3 point field goal leaders ==
Player nationality set by the player's national team affiliation. In bold, players active during the 2025–26 ACB season. In gold, players with more than 650 three-pointers, considered by the ACB as historic players.

As of 15 June 2026:

Rank	Player	Games	3 Pointers Made	Average
1.	(Spain) Alberto Herreros	654	1,233	1.89
2.	(Spain) Juan Carlos Navarro	689	1,179	1.71
3.	(Spain) **Sergio Llull**	696	1,078	1.55
4.	(Spain) Rudy Fernández	564	941	1.67
5.	(Spain) Álex Mumbrú	677	901	1.33
6.	(Spain) Rafa Martínez	629	885	1.41
7.	(Croatia) Velimir Perasovic	354	882	2.49
8.	(Azerbaijan) Jaycee Carroll	461	858	1.88
9.	(Spain) Raúl Pérez	495	770	1.56
10.	(United States) Louis Bullock	364	734	2.02
11.	(Spain) Pau Ribas	576	720	1.25
12.	(Spain) Rafa Jofresa	756	712	0.94
13.	(Spain) Xavi Fernández	499	710	1.42
14.	(Spain) Joan Creus	585	702	1.20
15.	(Slovakia) **Kyle Kuric**	399	697	1.74
16.	(Spain) Chicho Sibilio	348	693	1.99
17.	(Spain) Nacho Azofra	705	686	0.97
18.	(Argentina) Juan Espil	339	681	2.01
19.	(United States) Andre Turner	378	672	1.78
20.	(Spain) Javi Salgado	462	661	1.43

== Liga ACB all-time free throw percentage leaders ==
Stats as of May 8, 2022

Rank	Player	Games played	Total free throws made	Total free throws attempted	Free throw percentage
1	Alec Peters	51	100	108	92.59
2	Clevin Hannah	221	507	572	88.64
3	Kyle Kuric	291	370	419	88.31
4	Louis Bullock	364	1,381	1,570	87.96
5	Donatas Slanina	160	430	489	87.93
6	Marcelo Huertas	583	947	1,081	87.60
7	Stevan Jelovac	96	450	519	86.71
8	Pau Ribas	488	528	609	86.70
9	Oscar Schmidt	66	363	423	85.81
10	Klemen Prepelic	106	356	415	85.78
11	Cory Higgins	65	168	196	85.71
