= Predrag Danilović =

Serbian basketball player (born 1970)

Predrag Danilović Предраг Даниловић
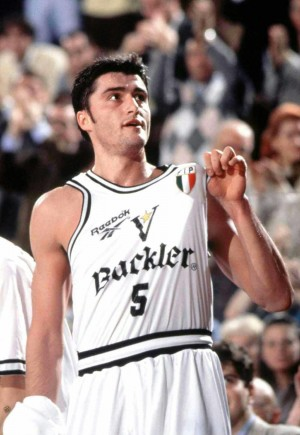

President of the Basketball Federation of Serbia (KSS)
- In office 15 December 2016 – 1 October 2024
- Preceded by: Dragan Đilas
- Succeeded by: Nebojša Čović

Personal details
- Born: February 26, 1970 (age 56) Sarajevo, SR Bosnia and Herzegovina, Yugoslavia
- Occupation: Basketball player; basketball administrator
- Basketball career

Personal information
- Listed height: 6 ft 7 in (2.01 m)
- Listed weight: 200 lb (91 kg)

Career information
- High school: Cookville (Cookeville, Tennessee)
- NBA draft: 1992: 2nd round, 43rd overall pick
- Drafted by: Golden State Warriors
- Playing career: 1988–2000
- Position: Shooting guard
- Number: 5

Career history
- 1988–1992: Partizan
- 1992–1995: Virtus Bologna
- 1995–1997: Miami Heat
- 1997: Dallas Mavericks
- 1997–2000: Virtus Bologna

Career highlights
- Mister Europa Player of the Year (1998); 2× EuroLeague champion (1992, 1998); FIBA EuroLeague Final Four MVP (1992); FIBA EuroLeague Top Scorer (1995); 2× FIBA EuroStar (1997, 1998); 4× Italian League champion (1993–1995, 1998); 5× Italian All-Star (1992, 1993, 1997–1999); Italian League MVP (1998); Yugoslav League champion (1992); No. 5 retired by Virtus Bologna; 50 Greatest EuroLeague Contributors (2008)
- Stats at NBA.com
- Stats at Basketball Reference
Medals
Representing Yugoslavia
FIBA EuroBasket
Gold medal – first place	1989 Zagreb
Gold medal – first place	1991 Rome
European Championship for Juniors
Gold medal – first place	1988 Yugoslavia	Under-18
Representing Yugoslavia
Summer Olympic Games
Silver medal – second place	1996 Atlanta
EuroBasket
Gold medal – first place	1995 Greece
Gold medal – first place	1997 Spain
Bronze medal – third place	1999 France

Predrag "Saša" Danilović (Serbian Cyrillic: Предраг "Саша" Даниловић, pronounced [prêdraːɡ saːʃa danǐːloʋitɕ]; born February 26, 1970), usually referred to in English as Sasha Danilović, is a Serbian professional basketball executive who served as the president of KK Partizan and Basketball Federation of Serbia and former player, considered one of the best European shooting guards of the 1990s. Danilović was the EuroLeague Final Four MVP in 1992, was voted Mister Europa Player of the Year in 1998, and was Italian League MVP the same year.

Beginning in 2007, Danilović served as the president of Partizan, the club with which he spent six years as a player during the 1980s and early 1990s. In 2015, he resigned from the position. On December 15, 2016, Danilović became the president of the Basketball Federation of Serbia (KSS). He resigned from the position in late 2024.

== Early life and career ==
Born in Sarajevo to a family of Herzegovinian Serbs (father Milan from the Orašje Zubci village near Trebinje and mother Vuka from the Kukričje village near Bileća), Danilović grew up in the Alipašino polje neighbourhood near the RTV Sarajevo main building. Many of his childhood summers and winters were spent in his father's and mother's respective villages, as well as in the town of Trebinje where he had aunts and uncles.

A tall and lanky kid, Danilović excelled at a variety of sports, including football, speed skating, and street basketball. Already showing promise at streetball, in 1984, the fourteen-year-old began playing organized basketball in KK Bosna's youth setup under youth coach Mladen "Makso" Ostojić. The player's talent was immediately evident and it didn't take long before he started receiving attention from bigger Yugoslav clubs such as KK Partizan whose assistant coach Duško Vujošević was alerted to the youngster's talents by the team's point guard Željko Obradović who had spotted Danilović during summer 1985 at a Yugoslav intra-republic youth basketball tournament on Mount Zlatibor. Young Danilović played for a select team of players representing SR Bosnia-Herzegovina at the tournament.

By late 1985, Vujošević started courting the fifteen-year-old. Getting Danilović and his parents to agree to a move to Belgrade proved to be the easy part; the real challenge was getting his club KK Bosna to sign off on the transfer. Danilović wasn't under a professional contract with the Sarajevo club, however, according to Yugoslav Basketball Federation (KSJ) rules, being a youth system prospect, he needed his club's permission to complete the move. In Danilović's own words: "Bosna club management weren't too keen on me at all while I was there; they had even been planning to loan me out to other Sarajevo-area clubs, which I didn't want at all. But then Vujošević started sniffing around, and they suddenly wanted to keep me. Also, Bosna club president Mirza Delibašić and Partizan vice-president Dragan Kićanović were close friends going back to their playing days, so that created additional awkwardness and the whole thing dragged out for a while".

Since Bosna didn't want to let him go, by the summer of '86 Danilović and Partizan decided to act unilaterally to move the player to Belgrade, knowing full well he'd have to sit out a year before taking part in official competitions. The move marked the beginning of a long friendship and professional association between Danilović and Vujošević, with the twenty-eight-year-old coach initially acting as a mentor to the sixteen-year-old player. By December 1986 Vujošević had moved up in the Partizan club hierarchy, becoming head coach in place of the fired Vladislav Lučić while young Danilović trained by himself and with the first team. Due to the unfortunate administrative situation, Danilović could only practice with Partizan players, which he did vigorously and assiduously, up to 7 or 8 hours per day. He stated in later interviews that it wasn't until his arrival at Partizan that he started training seriously. His living arrangements were provided for by the club; they put him up in a room at the JNA Stadium that he shared with youngster teammates Oliver Popović and Popović's brother. Furthermore, in accordance with his parents' wishes, the club ensured he also pursued his full-time secondary education by getting enrolled in the streamlined Petar Drapšin Technical High School. However, unable to make the classes due to frequent, lengthy practices, he soon switched to part-time education at the streamlined touristic high school. Discussing his first days in Belgrade and arrival at a new club, Danilović later said:

Certain people at Partizan liked me very much, but there were also those within the club who thought I was a 'neanderthal from Sarajevo' because I was a very brazen kid and I practiced like an animal. At that moment, for me, Vujošević was both a coach and a father. He molded me into a basketball player and into a man. It was from him that I learned to devote attention to individual work. I realized that talent without work means absolutely nothing. Even with hard work, it's still not enough sometimes because you may miss out on some fortunate breaks here and there. Luckily, I got those too.

Simultaneously KK Partizan tried to obtain permission to officially register their new player while Bosna for their part launched a claim against the player with KSJ, which ruled in their favour, and young Danilović had another year added to his prohibition on playing for any age bracket within Partizan's system.

Faced with new developments over the length of his ban, in the summer of 1987, seventeen-year-old Danilović moved to Cookeville, Tennessee, enrolling at Cookeville High School where he was a basketball, track, and water polo star coming in second place to Daren Matthews at the school meet. However, only seven months later, in February 1988, he went back to Belgrade. Coming back to SFR Yugoslavia from the United States, Danilović resumed practicing with Partizan, though still unable to play in official games with them. His living arrangements also changed; the club moved him to Hotel Putnik in New Belgrade for a short time before eventually putting him up in an apartment in Blok 45 that he shared with Popović. In summer 1988, Danilović was included in the Yugoslavia under-18 national team that competed at the European Championship for Juniors on home soil in Titov Vrbas and Srbobran. Coached by his mentor Vujošević and playing alongside promising Yugoslav juniors Arijan Komazec, Žan Tabak, Rastko Cvetković, etc., Danilović led the team to the gold medal.

== Club career ==
=== KK Partizan ===
==== 1988–89 season: Korać Cup & Yugoslav Cup winners, losing the Yugoslav league finals ====
In the summer of 1988, Danilović's two-year ban finally expired and the player was free to suit up for Partizan. Already familiar with the players he had been practicing with for more than a year, the 18-year-old joined a roster laden with talent at all positions – 21-year-old point guard Saša Đorđević, 22-year-old forward Žarko Paspalj who could play both the three and four positions, 22-year-old small forward Ivo Nakić, versatile 20-year-old center Vlade Divac, and his 21-year-old backup Miroslav Pecarski as well as a pair of experienced 28-year-olds: backup point guard Željko Obradović and backup center Milenko Savović. Starting small forward Goran Grbović (who often also played the shooting guard position) left the club for Oximesa that summer, opening up space for the incoming Danilović. Coming off a season in which they made the EuroLeague Final Four (eliminated by Maccabi in the semi-final) and lost to emerging Jugoplastika in the Yugoslav League playoff final series, the young Partizan team was looking to reclaim the domestic league title.

Young Danilović immediately got big minutes at shooting guard, registering a promising debut campaign, especially excelling at defense while contributing a modest 5.6 points per game on offense (123 points over 21 league appearances). Partizan finished the regular season in first place with a 16–6 record, the same as Jugoplastika, but with a better point differential, meaning the Belgrade club would have home-court advantage in the playoffs.

Winning both cup competitions that season – the FIBA Korać Cup and the Yugoslav Cup — came as a great confidence boost for the young squad. The two trophies came in quick succession during mid-March 1989 – on Thursday, March 16, Partizan went to Cantù for the first leg of the Korać Cup final away versus Wiwa Vismara, losing by 13 points with Danilović getting the starting assignment and registering 10 points, followed up immediately by a trip to Maribor to play Jugoplastika in the Yugoslav Cup final on Sunday, March 19, winning 87–74, before returning home for the return leg of the Korać Cup final at home in Hala sportova on Wednesday, March 22, and winning by 19 to undo their first-leg deficit and take the trophy. Danilović, this time coming off the bench, again contributed with 10 key points in the return leg, getting his name on his second major trophy within three days.

Back on the domestic league front, in the playoff semi-final, Partizan easily eliminated crosstown rivals Crvena Zvezda, setting up the finals rematch with Jugoplastika of the EuroLeague in which they had just triumphed. The best-of-three final series started in Belgrade, but right away Partizan lost the home-court advantage by dropping the opening game 73–74. The series shifted to Split where Jugoplastika won 75–70, beating Partizan to the league championship for the second straight season.

==== 1989–90 season: broken leg ====
A testament to his brilliant debut season, in the summer of 1989 Danilović got called up for the Yugoslav national team training camp by head coach Dušan Ivković ahead of EuroBasket 1989, eventually making the final 12-man squad where he played alongside club teammates Divac and Paspalj. Coming back to Partizan later that summer, the roster went through major changes as both Divac and Paspalj left after signing NBA contracts, with the Lakers and Spurs, respectively, point guard Đorđević served out his mandatory Yugoslav People's Army (JNA) stint thus missing most of the season, and head coach Vujošević left for Spanish club Oximesa from Granada, taking veteran center Savović with him. Reba Ćorković, who had previously coached the club for two stint - during the mid-1970s and then in the early 1980s —winning two domestic league titles, in 1975–76 and 1980–81 seasons - returned as head coach.

Playing with a depleted roster, the season turned out to be a write-off as it quickly became clear this Partizan squad was no match for tougher Yugoslav clubs. Their deficiencies were especially evident at center as Pecarski, who in the absence of Divac was forced into playing big minutes, was often outplayed by the opposition's big man. Partizan finished the season in 8th place with a 9–13 record, missing the playoffs – the club's worst league finish in nineteen years. They didn't fare much better in the Yugoslav Cup or FIBA European Cup Winners' Cup, finishing both competitions at the quarterfinal stage. It wasn't much better for Danilović individually, either: after steadily improving performances started the season off strongly, he suffered a season-ending broken leg after only 11 games, posting 14.3ppg. The injury also kept him out of contention for inclusion in the Yugoslavia national team roster at the 1990 World Championship.

==== 1990–91 season: return from injury, another Yugoslav league finals loss ====
Using his by-now-famous work ethic, twenty-year-old Danilović focused on rehabilitating his broken leg to regain game fitness for the start of the 1990–91 season. Meanwhile, the team went through significant changes with head coach Ćorković let go and eventually replaced by Danilović's mentor Vujošević who thus returned to the club after a largely unsuccessful episode in Spain. Another returnee with a sub-par season behind him was old favourite Paspalj, back after only a season with the Spurs. With Partizan's main title contender, reigning European and Yugoslav champions KK Split going through a coaching change with their head coach Boža Maljković accepting Barça's lucrative offer, in addition to center Dino Rađa's lucrative move to Italy, the reinforced Partizan roster seemed poised to finally overtake its biggest rival of the last few years.

With fully recovered shooting guard Danilović confidently sharing Partizan's backcourt with point guard Saša Đorđević, the team finished the regular season in second with an 18–4 record behind KK Split's 19–3. Now an integral part of the team, Danilović contributed 13.9 points per game over the course of the season.

In season 1991/92, with rookie coach and former teammate Željko Obradović, backed up by great Aleksandar " the Profesor" Nikolić, paired up again with one of the greatest point guards of Europe, Saša Đorđević, he led Partizan to first Euro League title. Due to UN sanctions, Partizan played all home games, bit 1 in playoff, in Fuenlabrada, Spain.

In late June 1992, Danilović entered the NBA draft where he was taken in the second round by Golden State Warriors as the 43rd overall pick. He eventually decided to stay in Europe, signing with sports agent Mira Poljo, an established agent with good connections in Italy through the Interperformances sports agency. She soon referred him to her colleague Luciano Capicchioni. Danilović eventually signed a lucrative contract with Knorr Bologna paying him approximately $900,000 per season.

=== Virtus Bologna ===
Arriving in the Italian city of Bologna, with the club Virtus and with an aura of the EuroLeague champion and EuroLeague Final Four MVP, big things were expected of 22-year-old Danilović. Earlier that summer, the club went through an ownership change with businessman Alfredo Cazzola acquiring it.

==== 1992–93 season: Italian champions, Euroleague struggles ====
Coached by Ettore Messina and playing alongside point guard Roberto Brunamonti and a center line of Bill Wennington and Augusto Binelli, Danilović led the team to the top of the standings in the regular season with a 24–6 record, ahead of former teammate Saša Đorđević's Philips Milano and reigning league champions Benetton Treviso, led by Toni Kukoč, before sweeping through the playoffs without a single loss, overcoming Olimpia Pistoia, Clear Cantù, and finally Kukoč's Treviso in the playoff final series to win the Italian League title in impressive style. Dueling with his old Yugoslav League nemesis, Danilović got the better of Kukoč this time. Establishing himself as Virtus's undisputed leader, Danilović averaged a combined 23.7 points per game over the course of the regular season and playoffs.

In contrast to the domestic league, EuroLeague success proved elusive. The campaign started in early October, but it was the opening group stage game on October 29, 1992, that brought Danilović an uncomfortable away trip to play against Cibona in Zagreb. He thus became the very first Serb to play a competitive game in the newly independent Croatia after the breakup of Yugoslavia while the wars in the former Yugoslavia continued. Rattled by playing in an extremely hostile atmosphere, Danilović had a poor shooting night making 5 of 15 field goals, good for only 12 points as Virtus lost by 16. Talking about the Zagreb experience, later in 1996, Danilović said: "Traveling to the game I assumed there would be issues, but I certainly didn't expect that much hate. Eight thousand people showed up just to insult a Serb. Getting through that game was not easy at all for me and you can tell from my stats. Even their player Franjo Arapović as well as their head coach Aco Petrović were hostile before the game even started wanting to hurl abuse at me, but I managed to put them in their place once we got out on the court. Also I think the two of them realized they had a rematch to play in Bologna in a few months so they didn't want to antagonize me too much". In the rematch at home in January 1993, an inspired Danilović led the way with 9 of 12 field goal shooting and 23 points as Virtus jumped out to an early lead, and building on the early advantage to win by 40. Making it out of the group stage in the last qualifying spot with a 6–6 record meant that in their quarter-final best-of-three series Virtus would face the top-placed team from the other group – the formidable Real Madrid squad led by Arvydas Sabonis. Virtus got blown out by Real, losing the first game at PalaDozza by 20 points with Danilović scoring 4 points, while five days later in Madrid, Real finished the job with another convincing victory, this time by 21 points.

==== 1993–94 season: Another league title ====
In summer 1993, coach Messina left the club to take the head coaching position at the Italian national team with returning coach Alberto Bucci coming in as his replacement at Bologna. The club got a new naming-rights sponsor, non-alcoholic Buckler Beer, as they anticipated moving into a new arena that was still under construction. The roster largely remained the same; the only notable player personnel changes were the departure of Wennington, who returned to the NBA's Chicago Bulls, and the arrival of former NBA player Cliff Levingston from PAOK. With Danilović's contributions to the success of Virtus, he, together with his agent Luciano Capicchioni, also began looking at the NBA as an option again, but eventually decided to stay put with Bologna, at least for the time being.

The new season, 1993–94, mostly mirrored the previous one as it quickly became clear that no club was a match for Virtus in the Italian League. Jumping to the top of the standings with five straight wins to open the season, they never relinquished the top spot until the end, finishing the regular season with an identical 24–6 record from the previous campaign. Well settled in Italy—and nicknamed lo Zar (the Tzar) and Zar Freddo (the Cold Tzar) by the Italian sports media for his prowess and cool demeanour under pressure on the court as well as his catlike inscrutability off it—Danilović continued to lead the team. In December 1993, approximately midway through the season, Virtus moved into their newly built 8,650-seat arena PalaMalaguti (which now seats 11,000), located outside of the city centre in Casalecchio di Reno.

=== Miami Heat ===
Despite being selected by the Golden State Warriors with the 43rd pick overall in the 1992 NBA draft, Danilović continued playing in Europe for three more seasons before debuting in the National Basketball Association (NBA). In the meantime, in November 1994, his rights were traded to the Miami Heat as part of a deal that sent 25-year-old Billy Owens to the Heat while the Warriors got 29-year-old center Rony Seikaly. In mid-June 1995, Danilović signed a four-year contract with Miami worth just over US$8 million. To accommodate signing Danilović, the Heat decided to trade Harold Miner to Cleveland in exchange for second-round draft picks and future considerations, thus freeing up space under NBA's salary cap.

Several months later, one day before the scheduled start of the regular season, Miami pulled off a blockbuster trade with the Charlotte Hornets, sending the Heat's franchise player Glen Rice along with starting center Matt Geiger and point guard Khalid Reeves to the Hornets in exchange for their star player Alonzo Mourning, along with reserves Pete Myers and LeRon Ellis.

During his two NBA seasons (1995–1997), Danilović averaged 12.8 points, 2.4 rebounds and 2 assists per game.

==== 1995–96 season: making the starting five, wrist injury layoff ====
Danilović debuted for the Heat on Saturday, November 4, 1995, the opening day of the season, as a starter at the shooting guard position alongside Bimbo Coles, Billy Owens, Kevin Willis, and Alonzo Mourning. He contributed a team-high 16 points, helping his team beat the Cleveland Cavaliers 85–71 before getting ejected towards the end of the game for an altercation with Cleveland's Chris Mills. The incident that saw both players thrown out of the game started in fourth quarter with 5:42 left to play, when Mills hit Danilović with a flying elbow to the chin as Danilović was cutting across the baseline, to which Danilović responded by allowing Mills to catch up on the next play and elbowing him in the side of his head, to which Mills then immediately reacted with a right hook to Danilović's jaw, leaving him with a cut lip that required nine stitches outside his mouth and three more inside. After the game, Danilović said he was just getting back at Mills after being hit, while Mills claimed Danilović had been playing dirty all game long. Both players were subsequently fined and suspended by the league – Mills received a one-game suspension and US$10,000 fine while Danilović also got suspended for one game for retaliation as well as a $3,500 fine.

Despite receiving criticism over what some considered overly aggressive play, the Heat opened the season with an 11–3 record playing a starting five of Coles, Danilović, Owens, Willis, and Mourning. Just as Danilović began hitting his shooting stride in December 1995, averaging 20 points per game in the four contests between December 6–12, 1995, including a season-high 30 points away at Phoenix, his season was disrupted by injury. On December 14, 1995, two days after appearing in the away loss at Golden State during which he scored 15 points he fell and aggravated an injury first sustained during his time in Italy. He was consequently placed on the team's injured list with right wrist issues that looked to be minor initially. As an injury he had played through for three years, Danilović was confident it would be overcome by treatment methods he was well-accustomed to at this point. However, when the swelling persisted while his attempts to rehabilitate his wrist through therapy failed, it became apparent that the injury was more serious this time, requiring attention of a specialist. Danilović's frustration at being on the sidelines with an injury that showed no signs of improving became evident on December 23, 1995. During halftime of an away game at Charlotte that he watched in street clothes from the bench, he was signing autographs near the tunnel leading to the locker rooms when an abusive fan began verbally haranguing him; Danilović reacted by confronting the fan physically and had to be restrained by Heat executive Randy Pfund. At South Miami Hospital on January 2, 1996, hand specialist Dr. Ann Ouelette performed surgery on Danilović's right hand to repair a non-union of the scaphoid bone. The surgery was successful, but with his hand in a cast and the recovery process expected to last 3–4 months, there were doubts about whether Danilović's season was over. In early February 1996, with his plan to be back in action for the final month of the regular season, Danilović was allowed to leave the team and go back to visit his family in Italy and FR Yugoslavia. During Danilović's layoff, the Heat completely overhauled their roster including their early-season starting lineup. On February 23, 1996, the team made three trades on the same day, bringing in Tim Hardaway and Chris Gatling from Golden State for Bimbo Coles and Kevin Willis, then getting Walt Williams and Tyrone Corbin from Sacramento for Billy Owens and Kevin Gamble, and finally acquiring Tony Smith from Phoenix for Terrence Rencher.

The projections of Danilović' return from injury at the beginning of April 1996 proved overly optimistic as he came bacķ a bit later - on April 21, 1996, at home versus Atlanta, the Heat's last game of the regular season. Very rusty after four months on the sidelines during which he missed 62 games, Danilović, who had in the meantime also lost his starting spot to Rex Chapman, put up a modest 8 points during 25 minutes of action off the bench on 3 for 9 shooting from the field that included airballing his first shot back after the injury layoff and coming up well short on his first 3-point shot as Miami lost 92–104. The Heat ended the season with 42–40 record, qualifying for the playoffs as the eighth-placed team in the Eastern Conference where they would face the juggernaut Michael Jordan's Chicago Bulls team that had lost only 10 games the entire season.

Making his NBA playoff debut only five days after coming back from months-long injury layoff, Danilović started on the bench as coach Riley retained Chapman as his starting shooting guard. The Serb had another poor post-injury outing, scoring only 3 points in 22 minutes on 1 for 3 from the field as Miami got blown out 102–85 by the Bulls. Two days later, game two of the series brought a much improved performance by Danilović who scored a team-high 15 points off the bench in 23 minutes; however, the Heat suffered an even worse blowout, this time by 31 points. The series then shifted to Miami, and the rampant Bulls converted on their first opportunity to end the series, beating the Heat easily for the third time in a row, 112–91, as Danilović, playing reduced minutes, scored 7 points.

=== Return to Virtus ===
In early June 1997, after getting offered a US$6 million net income three-year contract from his old club Virtus, Danilović decided to end his time in the NBA, two years short of completing his 4-year contract, thus forfeiting $4.9 million in NBA salary. On April 23, 1998, Danilović won his second EuroLeague, defeating AEK in Barcelona. While on May 31, Virtus took its 14th national title in five games against Teamsystem Bologna. With 20 seconds to go anad Fortitudo leading by 4, Danilović made a three-point shot while being fouled by Dominique Wilkins, completing a four point play. Than Virtus went on to win the game in overtime. The 1998 final between Virtus and Fortitudo is widely considered the greatest in the history of Italian basketball, with two of the teams on the continent playing in the same city.

The following season, Virtus won its 7th Italian Cup but lost in the EuroLeague final against Žalgiris of Tyus Edney and was eliminated in the semi-finals for the national championship. Under Cazzola's presidency and thanks to the leadership of Danilović and coach Messina, the 1990s were considered Virtus' "Golden Age" with four national titles, two Italian Cups, a Cup Winners' Cup and a EuroLeague, making them one of the most high-profile and successful teams in Europe. At the end of the following season, in October 2000, Danilović surprised many by announcing his retirement from professional basketball.

== Career statistics ==
=== EuroLeague ===
Legend
GP	Games played	GS	Games started	MPG	Minutes per game
FG%	Field-goal percentage	3P%	3-point field-goal percentage	FT%	Free-throw percentage
RPG	Rebounds per game	APG	Assists per game	SPG	Steals per game
BPG	Blocks per game	PPG	Points per game	PIR	Performance index rating
**Bold**	Career high

†	Denotes seasons in which Danilović won the EuroLeague
	Led the league

Year	Team	GP	GS	MPG	FG%	3P%	FT%	RPG	APG	SPG	BPG	PPG	PIR
1991–92†	Partizan	19	?	29.8	**.555**	**.470**	.747	**4.5**	1.6	**2.2**	.0	19.4	?
1992–93	Virtus Bologna	15	?	33.8	.548	.341	.747	3.6	1.1	1.7	.0	18.7	?
1993–94	Virtus Bologna	14	?	33.0	.497	.327	.843	3.1	1.6	1.4	.0	20.0	?
1994–95	Virtus Bologna	17	?	33.8	.535	.349	.807	2.8	1.6	1.9	.0	**22.1**	?
1997–98†	Virtus Bologna	**21**	?	**36.9**	.467	.304	.747	3.8	**3.2**	1.2	.0	17.5	?
1998–99	Virtus Bologna	14	?	35.2	.500	.300	**.845**	1.6	1.9	1.2	.0	16.9	?
Career		100	?	?	?	?	?	?	?	?	?	?	?

== National team career ==
With the senior Yugoslav national basketball team, Danilović won the gold medal at both the 1989 EuroBasket and the 1991 EuroBasket. With the senior FR Yugoslav national basketball team, he won the gold medal at both the 1995 EuroBasket and the 1997 EuroBasket. He was also a member of the silver medal-winning FR Yugoslav team at the 1996 Atlanta Summer Olympics.

== Titles ==
- (European Union) EuroLeague: 2 (with Partizan: 1991–92 and Virtus Bologna: 1997–98)
- (European Union) Korać Cup: 1 (with Partizan: 1988–89)
- (Socialist Federal Republic of Yugoslavia) Yugoslav Cup: 2 (with Partizan: 1988–89, 1991–92)
- (Federal Republic of Yugoslavia) Yugoslav League: 1 (with Partizan: 1991–92)
- (Federal Republic of Yugoslavia) Yugoslav Cup: 1 (with Partizan: 1991–92)
- (Italy) Italian League: 4 (with Virtus Bologna: 1992–93, 1993–94, 1994–95, 1997–98)
- (Italy) Italian Cup: 1 (with Virtus Bologna: 1998–99)

== Administrative career ==
=== Partizan vice-president (2000–2004) ===
In October 2000, shortly after retiring from playing professionally, Danilović became co-vice president of his old club KK Partizan alongside Žarko Paspalj, Dražen Dalipagić, and Ivica Divac, working under the also newly named club president Vlade Divac. The appointment came about on initiative by the club's about to be deposed president Ivica Dačić during the time of political upheaval in Serbia in the wake of the Slobodan Milošević overthrow. Seeing that various state-owned companies and community property were being taken over in a dubious manner during the power vacuum that resulted from régime change, Dačić (the club's outgoing president and, more importantly, a suddenly marginalized politician who, due to his association with Milošević, was forced to leave his post at the club) saw it prudent to bring the club's two former greats as a safeguard against the same happening to KK Partizan.

Since club president Divac was at the time still an active player in the NBA with Sacramento Kings, while nominal co-vice presidents Paspalj, Dalipagić, and Ivica Divac exhibited little interest in being involved in the club's day-to-day business, Danilović essentially became the main decision-maker at KK Partizan.

Inheriting a head coach, Darko Russo, Danilović let him finish out the season before hiring old mentor and friend Duško Vujošević during summer 2001. Vujošević immediately started producing results, winning the league title in 2001–02, ending KK Budućnost's three-year league championship run. It was the first of nine consecutive league trophies under his command. Though continually cash-strapped, under the command of Danilović, Divac, and sporting director Dragan Todorić, the club instituted a model of bringing up domestic young players from its own youth setup or smaller clubs in Serbia and Montenegro rather than relying on foreign imports. It proved a winner both on the court and business-wise as Partizan sold its best player in regular intervals (usually every summer) and then re-invested that money into the youth system or acquiring talented youngsters from smaller clubs while making sure that squad can function with other players stepping up. Under this model, in summer 2003 Miloš Vujanić was sold to Fortitudo Bologna while the following summer 2004 Nenad Krstić got sold to New Jersey Nets. The club managed to win the domestic league FR Yugoslavia/Serbia-Montenegro league year after year, ensuring a EuroLeague spot, which was essential for its bottom line.

Simultaneously, Danilović was very much against his club joining the regional Adriatic League. However, by 2004, Partizan was essentially forced into the regional competition because its Euroleague spot now depended on competing regionally rather than domestically. This also brought about change in the club's business model as in the summer of 2004 they brought in already established national team players 27-year-old Dejan Milojević from KK Budućnost and 29-year-old Milan Gurović from KK Vojvodina to bolster the squad ahead of the start of competition in Adriatic League. It would prove to be one of Danilović's last orders of business at the club as he soon left KK Partizan.

=== Partizan president (2007–2015) ===
In 2007 Danilović returned to KK Partizan, this time as president.

In late May 2007, following a Serbian Basketball League game from the SuperLeague phase, between KK Hemofarm and Partizan at Vršac's Millennium Centar, Danilović assaulted the referee Marko Juras. Dissatisfied over Juras' calls in the game that Partizan lost, thirty-seven-year-old KK Partizan president reportedly followed the twenty-nine-year-old referee into the referees' dressing room and proceeded to knock him to the floor, landing several punches. Juras filed a criminal complaint against Danilović as did the Serbian Ministry of Internal Affairs. In July 2007, Danilović got suspended by the Serbian Basketball Federation (KSS) from all basketball-related activity for two years, but two months later the punishment was reduced to a probationary period.

On August 24, 2015, he resigned from the president's position, after few years of financial troubles the club was going through.

=== Basketball Federation of Serbia president (2016–2024) ===
On December 15, 2016, Danilović became the president of the Basketball Federation of Serbia (KSS). On December 14, 2020, he was re-elected. He resigned from the position on August 27, 2024 and was succeeded by Nebojša Čović.

== Personal life ==
Danilović is married to Svetlana Danilović, an RTS sports reporter. The couple have three children, including Olga, a professional tennis player.

He was also involved with Group Seven, a charity organization founded by seven Serbian basketball players.

On February 11, 2009, Danilović filed a lawsuit against Worldwide Associates (a limited-liability company based in Carmel, Indiana and represented by Rick Suder and George Grkinich) alleging investment fraud connected to $4 million he gave the company to manage. Previously, Grkinich had also been involved with Group Seven.

=== Stabbing incident ===
In the early morning hours of Saturday, May 18, 2013, forty-three-year-old Danilović was stabbed during a bar brawl in Belgrade, sustaining injuries to his head, arms, and abdomen, for which he underwent surgery at Belgrade's Urgentni centar.

From the press reports, KK Partizan club president Danilović had been drinking and eating at the Kafanica bar, a kafana-type hospitality establishment in the Košutnjak neighbourhood, together with a party of friends including the bar's owner—Danilović's close friend, Branko "Fido" Filipović—before an altercation broke out around 2:20 am between Filipović and Danilović. Filipović reportedly struck Danilović in the head with an ashtray prompting someone from the bar to call an ambulance, which Danilović refused upon their arrival, sending them away. The fight between the two continued with Filipović now stabbing Danilović in the abdomen, and injured Danilović driving by himself to the hospital. Due to the nature of his injuries, considered "life-threatening", Danilović underwent emergency surgery before being placed in intensive care in stable condition. During the day Danilović was visited at the hospital by the Serbian prime minister Ivica Dačić (incidentally Danilović's personal friend and predecessor at the KK Partizan club president post), deputy prime minister Aleksandar Vučić and sports minister Alisa Marić. Talking to the press afterwards, prime minister Dačić jokingly described the circumstances of Danilović's stabbing as "traditional Serbian quarrel between friends".

On May 20, 2013, after unsuccessfully trying to summon Branko Filipović for questioning, Serbian police issued a warrant for his arrest. Danilović was released from the hospital on May 26, 2013 and was then seen in public at the Belgrade Airport awaiting the arrival of Jovica Stanišić and Franko Simatović, who had been acquitted at the Hague Tribunal. After being on the run for more than two weeks, Filipović was arrested in Belgrade on June 2, 2013. Though initially charging Filipović with "causing severe bodily harm with life-threatening injuries", the Serbian public prosecutor's office later upgraded his charge to "attempted murder".

During the trial, the role of Filipović's fiancée Sanja Ševović (who had been present at the bar the night of the stabbing) came under scrutiny, particularly the exact time she claimed to have left the bar. In February 2014, Filipović was sentenced in the Belgrade Higher Court to 4 1/2 years in prison for the attempted murder of Danilović. Having already spent nine months in prison detention, Filipović was released on the same occasion thus awaiting the sentence becoming legally-binding upon the completion of the appeals process for him to commence his jail time.

The case was appealed and, in May 2015, the Court of Appeals annulled the lower court sentence, ordering a re-trial. Initially set for late August 2015, the re-trial began in mid-October 2015. Following court dates throughout 2016, 2017, and 2018, in early May 2018 Filipović and the Serbian public prosecutor office reportedly reached an admission of guilt agreement awaiting the Higher Court confirmation. Several weeks later, in late May 2018, the Higher Court confirmed the agreement, sentencing Filipović to 1 1/2 years in prison in addition to a four-year conditional sentence.

== See also ==
- List of Serbian NBA players
- EuroBasket Records

Sporting positions
Preceded by Dragan Đilas	President of the Basketball Federation of Serbia; 2016–present	Succeeded by Incumbent
Preceded by Dušan Pavlović	President of KK Partizan; 2007–2015	Succeeded by Nikola Peković
