= 1993–94 FIBA European League =

- League: FIBA European League
- Sport: Basketball

Regular Season
- Top scorer: (Greece) Nikos Galis (Panathinaikos)

Final Four
- Champions: (Spain) 7up Joventut (1st title)
- Runners-up: (Greece) Olympiacos
- Final Four MVP: (Federal Republic of Yugoslavia) Žarko Paspalj (Olympiacos)

FIBA European League seasons
- ← 1992–93 1994–95 →

The 1993–94 FIBA European League, also shortened to 1993–94 FIBA EuroLeague, was the 37th installment of the European top-tier level professional club competition for basketball clubs (now called EuroLeague). It began on September 9, 1993, and ended on April 21, 1994. The competition's Final Four was held at Tel Aviv. The competition was won by 7up Joventut. They eliminated two other spanish teams Real Madrid and Barcelona in the knockouts and then won against Olympiacos by two points in the final match. It has been the club's only Euroleague (European League) title.

Limoges CSP, the defending champions, were eliminated in the quarterfinals by Panathinaikos.

Federal Republic of Yugoslavia's entrant was unable to participate for the second season in a row due to the UN economic sanctions. After the 1993 dissolution of Czechoslovakia, Czech Republic and Slovakia each had representative clubs in the competition for the first time.

== Competition system ==
- 41 teams (the cup title holder, national domestic league champions, and a variable number of other clubs from the most important national domestic leagues) played knock-out rounds on a home and away basis. The aggregate score of both games decided the winner.
- The sixteen remaining teams after the knock-out rounds entered the Regular Season Group Stage, divided into two groups of eight teams, playing a round-robin. The final standing was based on individual wins and defeats. In the case of a tie between two or more teams after the group stage, the following criteria were used to decide the final classification: 1) number of wins in one-to-one games between the teams; 2) basket average between the teams; 3) general basket average within the group.
- The top four teams from each group after the Regular Season Group Stage qualified for a quarterfinal playoff (X-pairings, best of 3 games).
- The four winners of the quarterfinal playoff qualified for the final stage (Final Four), which was played at a predetermined venue.

== Team allocation ==
The labels in the parentheses show how each team qualified for the place of its starting round:

- TH: Title holder
- 1st, 2nd, 3rd, 4th, 5th, etc.: League position after eventual Playoffs
- CW: Cup winners.

Group stage
(France) Limoges CSP (1st)^{TH}	(Greece) Olympiacos (1st)	(Italy) Buckler Beer Bologna (1st)	(Spain) Real Madrid Teka (1st)
Second round
(Italy) Benetton Treviso (2nd)	(Spain) FCB Banca Catalana (3rd)	(France) Pau-Orthez (2nd)	(Israel) Hapoel Galil Elyon (1st)
(Italy) Shampoo Clear Cantù (3rd)	(Belgium) Maes Pils Mechelen (1st)	(Germany) Bayer 04 Leverkusen (1st)	(Turkey) Efes Pilsen (1st)
(Spain) 7up Joventut (2nd)	(Croatia) Cibona (1st)	(Greece) Panathinaikos (2nd)	
First round
(Albania) Vllaznia (1st)	(England) Guildford Kings (CW)	(Lithuania) Žalgiris (1st)	(Russia) CSKA Moscow (1st)
(Austria) UKJ SÜBA Sankt Pölten (1st)	(Estonia) Kalev Tallinn (1st)	(Luxembourg) Residence (1st)	(Slovakia) Davay Pezinok (1st)
(Belarus) RTI Minsk (1st)	(Finland) KTP (1st)	(North Macedonia) Rabotnički (1st)	(Slovenia) Smelt Olimpija (1st)
(Bulgaria) Levski Sofia (1st)	(Hungary) Tunsgram-Honvéd (1st)	(Netherlands) Canoe Jeans EBBC (1st)	(Switzerland) Fidefinanz Bellinzona (1st)
Croatia Osiguranje Split (2nd)	(Iceland) Keflavik (1st)	(Poland) Śląsk Wroclaw (1st)	(Ukraine) Budivelnyk (1st)
(Cyprus) Achileas Kaimakli (1st)	(Israel) Hapoel Tel Aviv (2nd)	(Portugal) Benfica (1st)	
(Czech Republic) USK Praha (1st)	(Latvia) ASK Brocēni (1st)	(Romania) Universitatea Cluj (1st)	

== First round ==
Team 1	Agg.	Team 2	1st leg	2nd leg
Universitatea Cluj (Romania)	145–202	(Belarus) RTI Minsk	74–94	71–108
Rabotnički (North Macedonia)	152–135	(Hungary) Tunsgram-Honvéd	73–61	79–74
ASK Brocēni (Latvia)	203–190	(Finland) KTP	110–92	93–98
Pezinok (Slovakia)	151–167	(Switzerland) Fidefinanz Bellinzona	79–76	72–91
Budivelnyk (Ukraine)	143–170	(England) Guildford Kings	58–84	85–86
Résidence (Luxembourg)	130–180	(Czech Republic) USK Praha	67–94	63–86
Kalev (Estonia)	0–40^{*}	Croatia Osiguranje	0–20	0–20
Vllaznia (Albania)	130–172	(Austria) SÜBA Sankt Pölten	60–94	70–78
Hapoel Tel Aviv (Israel)	150–162	(Portugal) Benfica	83–75	67–87
CSKA Moscow (Russia)	150–154	(Slovenia) Smelt Olimpija	88–65	62–89
Canoe Jeans EBBC (Netherlands)	172–165	(Poland) Śląsk Wrocław	87–82	85–83
Keflavik (Iceland)	162–252	(Lithuania) Žalgiris	98–128	64–124
Levski Sofia (Bulgaria)	178–174	(Cyprus) Achilleas	109–91	69–83

^{*}Kalev withdrew before the first leg and Croatia Osiguranje Split received a forfeit (20–0) in both games.

== Second round ==
Team 1	Agg.	Team 2	1st leg	2nd leg
RTI Minsk (Belarus)	88–127	(Spain) FC Barcelona Banca Catalana	88–107	0–20^{*}
Rabotnički (North Macedonia)	163–177	(France) Pau-Orthez	74–86	89–91
ASK Brocēni (Latvia)	148–169	(Spain) 7up Joventut	79–81	69–88
Fidefinanz Bellinzona (Switzerland)	180–194	(Italy) Shampoo Clear Cantù	105–104	75–90
Guildford Kings (England)	151–149	(Israel) Hapoel Galil Elyon	86–78	65–71
USK Praha (Czech Republic)	148–185	(Italy) Benetton Treviso	75–88	73–97
Croatia Osiguranje	132–146	(Belgium) Maes Pils	72–63	60–83
SÜBA Sankt Pölten (Austria)	156–179	(Croatia) Cibona	78–85	78–94
Benfica (Portugal)	163–154	(Slovenia) Smelt Olimpija	87–63	76–91
Canoe Jeans EBBC (Netherlands)	144–168	(Germany) Bayer 04 Leverkusen	84–83	60–85
Žalgiris (Lithuania)	132–134	(Turkey) Efes Pilsen	60–77	72–57
Levski Sofia (Bulgaria)	147–165	(Greece) Panathinaikos	68–84	79–81

^{*}RTI Minsk refused to play the second leg and FC Barcelona received a forfeit (20–0) in this game.

== Group stage ==
If one or more clubs are level on won-lost record, tiebreakers are applied in the following order:

1. Head-to-head record in matches between the tied clubs
2. Overall point difference in games between the tied clubs
3. Overall point difference in all group matches (first tiebreaker if tied clubs are not in the same group)
4. Points scored in all group matches
5. Sum of quotients of points scored and points allowed in each group match

Key to colors
Qualified to Playoff
Eliminated

=== Group A ===
	Team	Pld	Pts	W	L	PF	PA	PD
1.	(Greece) Olympiacos	14	25	11	3	1047	897	+150
2.	(Spain) Real Madrid Teka	14	23	9	5	1123	978	+145
3.	(France) Limoges CSP	14	23	9	5	1013	979	+34
4.	(Spain) FC Barcelona Banca Catalana	14	22	8	6	1132	1067	+65
5.	(Belgium) Maes Pils	14	22	8	6	1040	1072	-32
6.	(Italy) Benetton Treviso	14	21	7	7	1085	1072	+13
7.	(Germany) Bayer 04 Leverkusen	14	18	4	10	1022	1045	-23
8.	(England) Guildford Kings	14	14	0	14	889	1241	-352

=== Group B ===
	Team	Pld	Pts	W	L	PF	PA	PD
1.	(Turkey) Efes Pilsen	14	24	10	4	1005	957	+48
2.	(Greece) Panathinaikos	14	23	9	5	1076	1024	+52
3.	(Spain) 7up Joventut	14	23	9	5	1116	1026	+90
4.	(Italy) Buckler Beer Bologna	14	23	9	5	1139	1017	+122
5.	(Croatia) Cibona	14	23	9	5	1126	1069	+57
6.	(Portugal) Benfica	14	19	5	9	1016	1093	-77
7.	(France) Pau-Orthez	14	17	3	11	1044	1155	-111
8.	(Italy) Shampoo Clear Cantù	14	16	2	12	1011	1192	-181

== Quarterfinals ==
Seeded teams played games 2 and 3 at home.

Team 1	Agg.	Team 2	1st leg	2nd leg	3rd leg
Buckler Beer Bologna (Italy)	1–2	(Greece) Olympiacos	77–64	69–89	62–65
7up Joventut (Spain)	2–0	(Spain) Real Madrid Teka	88–69	71–67	
FC Barcelona Banca Catalana (Spain)	2–1	(Turkey) Efes Pilsen	54–50	64–73	76–62
Limoges CSP (France)	1–2	(Greece) Panathinaikos	75–68	48–59	73–87

== Final four ==
=== Semifinals ===
April 19, Yad Eliyahu Arena, Tel Aviv

Team 1	Score	Team 2
Olympiacos (Greece)	77–72	(Greece) Panathinaikos
FC Barcelona Banca Catalana (Spain)	65–79	(Spain) 7up Joventut

=== 3rd place game ===
April 21, Yad Eliyahu Arena, Tel Aviv

Team 1	Score	Team 2
FC Barcelona Banca Catalana (Spain)	83–100	(Greece) Panathinaikos

=== Final ===
April 21, Yad Eliyahu Arena, Tel Aviv

Team 1	Score	Team 2
Olympiacos (Greece)	57–59	(Spain) 7up Joventut

1993–94 FIBA European League
Champions

7up Joventut
1st Title

=== Final standings ===
	Team
	(Spain) 7up Joventut
2nd place, silver medalist(s)	(Greece) Olympiacos
3rd place, bronze medalist(s)	(Greece) Panathinaikos
	(Spain) FC Barcelona Banca Catalana

== Awards ==
Award	Player	Club	Ref.
Season Top Scorer	(Greece) Nikos Galis	(Greece) Panathinaikos	
Final Four MVP	(Federal Republic of Yugoslavia) Žarko Paspalj	(Greece) Olympiacos	
Finals Top Scorer	(Spain) Ferran Martínez	(Spain) 7up Joventut	

== 1994 FIBA European League All-Final Four Team ==
Position	Player	Club	Ref.
Point guard	(Greece) Nikos Galis	(Greece) Panathinaikos	
Shooting guard	(Greece) Georgios Sigalas	(Greece) Olympiacos	
Small forward	(Spain) Jordi Villacampa	(Spain) 7up Joventut	
Power forward	(Federal Republic of Yugoslavia) Žarko Paspalj (MVP)	(Greece) Olympiacos	
Center	(United States) Corny Thompson	(Spain) 7up Joventut	

== See also ==
- 1993-94 FIBA European Cup
- 1993-94 FIBA Korać Cup
