= Mike Smith (basketball, born 1963) =

American-Spanish basketball player

Mikel Smith Gibbs (born September 10, 1963) is an American-Spanish former professional basketball player and a police officer in Washington, D.C.

== College career ==
Born in New York City, Smith played college basketball for USC–Spartanburg, beginning in 1982.

== Professional career ==
Smith played for twelve years in Spain, notably for Joventut Badalona and Real Madrid. He was the Spanish League's Finals MVP in 1992. With Joventut Badalona, he won the EuroLeague championship of the 1993–94 season, by winning the 1994 EuroLeague Final Four.

== Spain national team ==
Smith naturalized during his professional basketball play in Spain, and he played internationally for the senior Spain national team at two EuroBasket tournaments, 1995 and 1997.

== Police officer ==
In January 2024, at age 60, Smith was sworn in as a Washington, D.C. police officer, becoming the oldest rookie in the history of the Metropolitan Police Department of the District of Columbia. He is scheduled to graduate from the police academy in April 2024. Smith's father was a police sergeant in New York City.
