= Nacho Azofra =

Spanish basketball player

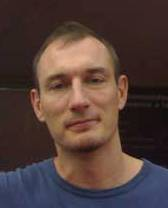

Personal information
- Born: 23 July 1969 (age 57) Madrid, Spain
- Listed height: 1.85 m (6 ft 1 in)

Career information
- Playing career: 1988–2007
- Position: Point guard

Career history

Playing
- 1988–1993: Estudiantes
- 1993–1995: Caja San Fernando
- 1995–2006: Estudiantes
- 2006–2007: Lagun Aro Bilbao

Coaching
- 2007–2008: Estudiantes (assistant)
- 2008–2012: Estudiantes (manager)

Ignacio "Nacho" Azofra de la Cuesta (born 23 July 1969) is a retired Spanish professional basketball player. He played most of his career for Estudiantes, with two brief spells playing for Caja San Fernando and Lagun Aro Bilbao. He also played for the Spain national basketball team.

== Professional career ==
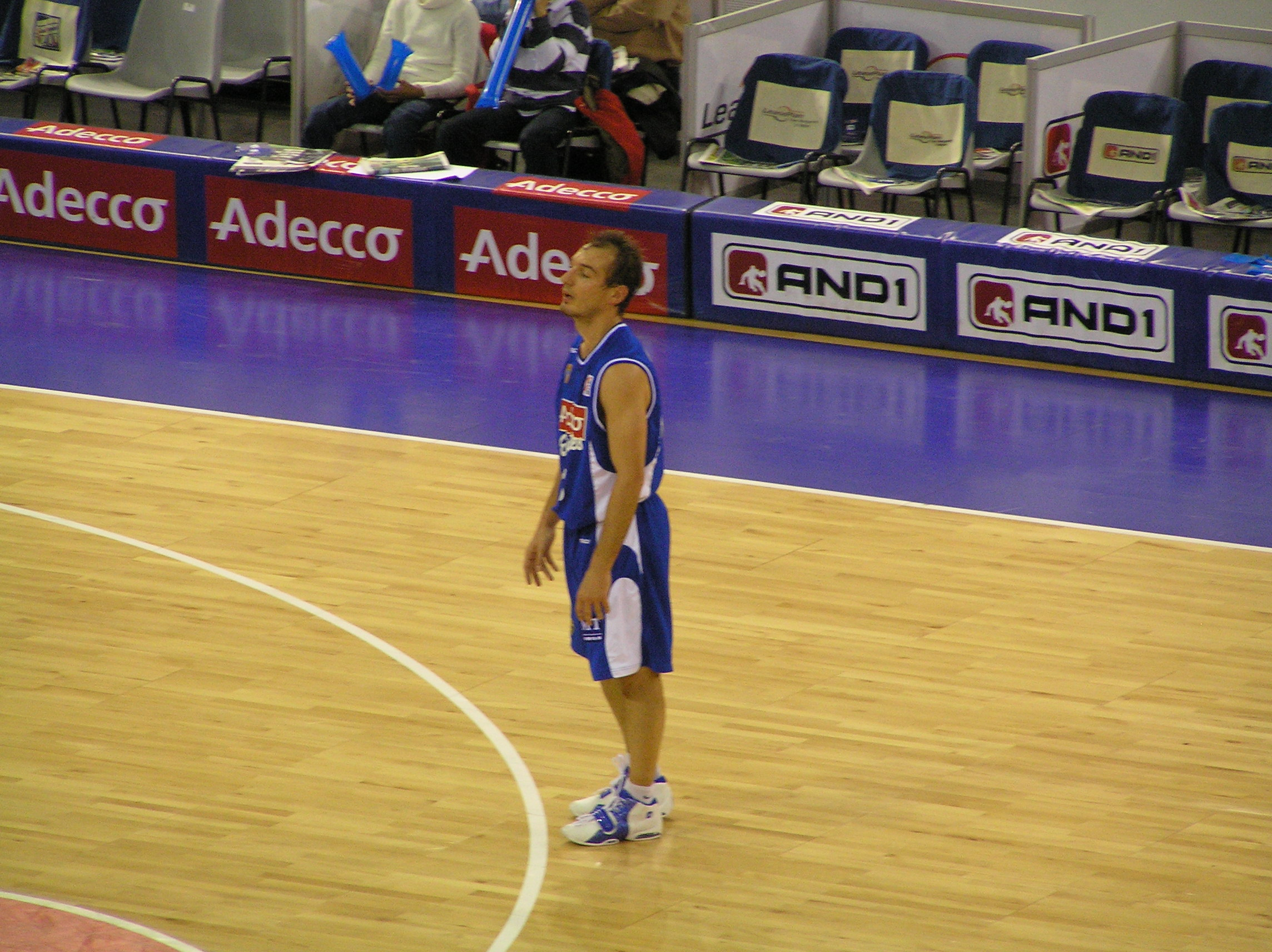

A 1.85 m (6'1') tall point guard, Azofra led the EuroLeague in assists, with 5.6 per game in the 1992–93 season. He spent almost his whole career playing for Estudiantes, with which he reached the 1992 EuroLeague Final Four, and a Korać Cup final in 1999. He is considered to be one of the all-time figures of the club of the club of Estudiantes.

He played in 705 games in the ACB League (the top-tier level Spanish basketball league), the third most in ACB history.

== Spain national team ==
Azofra was also a member of the senior Spain men's national basketball team. He played at the EuroBasket 1993 and the 1998 FIBA World Championship.

== Coaching career ==
After his retirement from his basketball playing career, Azofra returned to MMT Estudiantes, in a coaching role.

== Awards ==
=== Clubs ===
- 2x Spanish King's Cup Winner: (1991–92 and 1999–00) with Estudiantes
- EuroLeague Final Four: (1991–92) with Estudiantes
- Korać Cup Runner-up: (1998–99) with Estudiantes
- Spanish League Runner-up: (2003–04) with Estudiantes
