= Kenny Simpson =

American football player

Personal information
- Born: April 12, 1960 (age 66) Shreveport, Louisiana
- Listed height: 1.95 m (6 ft 5 in)

Career information
- High school: Fair Park (Shreveport, Louisiana)
- College: Grambling State (1978–1982)
- NBA draft: 1982: 5th round, 97th overall pick
- Drafted by: Kansas City Kings
- Position: power forward

Career history
- 1986–1987: Barcelona
- 1987–1988: Manresa

Career highlights
- FIBA Korać Cup champion (1986); European Basketball Club Super Cup (1986); Liga ACB champion (1987); Spanish Cup winner (1987); Spanish Supercup winner (1987); Spanish League Top Scorer (1988)
- Stats at Basketball Reference

Kenny Simpson (born April 12, 1960) is an American professional basketball player. Standing at 1.95 m (6 ft 5 in), he played at the small forward position.
