= Winfred King =

American basketball player (born 1961)

Personal information
- Born: June 12, 1961 (age 65) Atlanta, Georgia
- Listed height: 6 ft 10 in (2.08 m)
- Listed weight: 255 lb (116 kg)

Career information
- High school: North Fulton High School (Atlanta, Georgia)
- College: Anderson Junior College (1979–1981): Indiana State University (1981–1982); East Tennessee State University (1982–1983)
- NBA draft: 1983: 3rd round, 52nd overall pick
- Drafted by: Boston Celtics
- Playing career: 1983–1993
- Position: Center

Career history
- 1984–1985: Nuova Pallacanestro Gorizia
- 1985–1986: CB Breogán
- 1987–1988: CB Collado Villalba
- 1988–1991: APU Udine
- 1991–1992: Pallacanestro Firenze
- 1992–1993: Maccabi Tel Aviv B.C.

Career highlights
- All-Southern Conference and League's Leader in Rebounds per game (1983)
- Stats at Basketball Reference

Winfred King (born June 12, 1961) is an American retired professional basketball player.

== Early years and college ==
Born in Atlanta, Georgia, Winfred King attended North Fulton School. He averaged over 26 points per game in High School. He was coached by Glen Gleaton.

=== Anderson College ===
Winfred King spent two seasons as a member of the Anderson Junior College Men's Basketball Team. Playing alongside John Toms, who went on to start for the 1981–82 Wake Forest University Men's Team, which finished the 1981–82 season ranked 18th, in The nation; King helped lead The Perennial JUCO Powerhouse Trojans, to a 31–5 record and a 3rd place NJCAA National Finish during the 1980–81 Season.

King's coach at AC was John H Edwards Jr, who was known for emphasizing the importance of character and academics as much as the role of athletics in the lives of the young men he coached. While coaching at Samford University in Birmingham Alabama, He was involved in organizing the first "Integrated" Fellowship of Christian Athletes Conference in the state during the 1960s.

During High School, King had been "socially promoted," and as a result, his GPA and Board Scores disqualified him from admission to college. Coach Edwards went to the College Administration and made a plea that the school make an exception. He then enrolled King in the School's First Remedial Education Program. This allowed King to further benefit from "The College Experience," and eventually have a Successful Professional Basketball career, playing abroad.

=== Indiana State ===
King spent the 1981–82 season as a member of the Indiana State team, his coach was [Bill Hodges ]]. King averaged Averaged 11.6 points and 7.5 rebounds per game, as a Junior, before transferring to East Tennessee State University, in Johnston City, Tennessee.

=== East Tennessee ===
In 1983, his senior season, Winfred King led the 1982–83 East Tennessee State University Buccaneers to a record of 22–9 and berth in the NIT. He averaged 15.2 Points and a League Leading 10.3 Rebounds per game.

King would go on to be named to the All-Southern Conference Team, a League which was the very first to Implement the 3 Point Field Goal and would later produce such NBA greats as Davidson University's Stephen Curry.

== Professional career ==
=== Boston Celtics ===
Winfred King was selected as the 52nd overall pick in the 1983 NBA draft by the Boston Celtics. He did not appear in any regular season NBA games as he was injured late in the pre-season, the Celtics placed him on the injured reserve, and he went on to a successful multi-year career in the Italian and Spanish leagues. He finished his career during the 1992–93 season with Maccabi Tel Aviv B.C.

=== European leagues ===
He won the 1986 Galicia Cup with CB Breogán in the Spanish League.
