= 1992–93 FIBA European Championship quarterfinals =

The quarterfinals of the FIBA European Championship 1992–93 were the third of four stages of the annual Europe-wide club basketball competition.

Each quarterfinal was a best-of-three series between the teams qualified from the regular season, with the higher-place team receiving home advantage. Quarterfinals were played on 11 and 16 March 1993, with third games played on the 17th and 18th if necessary.

The winning teams advanced to the final four, held 13 April through 15 April 1993 at the Peace and Friendship Stadium in Athens.

Seeded teams played games 2 and 3 at home.

Team 1	Agg.	Team 2	1st leg	2nd leg	3rd leg
Pau-Orthez (France)	0–2	(Greece) PAOK	86–103	65–81	
Olympiacos (Greece)	1–2	(France) Limoges CSP	70–67	53–59	58–60
Knorr Bologna (Italy)	0–2	(Spain) Real Madrid Teka	56–76	58–79	
Scavolini Pesaro (Italy)	1–2	(Italy) Benetton Treviso	94–92	94–101	58–77

== Quarterfinal 1 ==
Game 1

11 March 1993

(Report)

Pau-Orthez (France)	86–103	(Greece) PAOK
Scoring by quarter: 40–44, 46–59

Palais des Sports, Pau
Attendance: 8,000

Game 2

16 March 1993

(Report)

PAOK (Greece)	81–65	(France) Pau-Orthez
Scoring by quarter: 32–31, 49–34

Alexandrio Melathron, Thessaloniki
Attendance: 6,000

== Quarterfinal 2 ==
Game 1

11 March 1993

(Report)

Olympiacos (Greece)	70–67	(France) Limoges CSP
Scoring by quarter: 32–31, 38–36

Dimitris Tofalos Arena, Patras
Attendance: 4,500

Game 2

16 March 1993

(Report)

Limoges CSP (France)	59–53	(Greece) Olympiacos
Scoring by quarter: 21–23, 38–30

Palais des Sports de Beaublanc, Limoges
Attendance: 6,500

Game 3

17 March 1993

(Report)

Limoges CSP (France)	60–58	(Greece) Olympiacos
Scoring by quarter: 34–31, 26–27

Palais des Sports de Beaublanc, Limoges
Attendance: 6,800

== Quarterfinal 3 ==
Game 1

11 March 1993

(Report)

Knorr Bologna (Italy)	56–76	(Spain) Real Madrid Teka
Scoring by quarter: 31–38, 25–38

PalaDozza, Bologna
Attendance: 7,000

Game 2

16 March 1993

(Report)

Real Madrid Teka (Spain)	79–58	(Italy) Knorr Bologna
Scoring by quarter: 44–34, 35–24

Palacio de Deportes, Madrid
Attendance: 11,500

== Quarterfinal 4 ==
Game 1

11 March 1993

(Report)

Scavolini Pesaro (Italy)	94–92	(Italy) Benetton Treviso
Scoring by quarter: 45–45, 49–47

Palestra di Baia Flaminia, Pesaro
Attendance: 5,000

Game 2

16 March 1993

(Report)

Benetton Treviso (Italy)	101–94	(Italy) Scavolini Pesaro
Scoring by quarter: 61–46, 40–48

Palaverde, Treviso
Attendance: 3,500

Game 3

18 March 1993

(Report)

Benetton Treviso (Italy)	77–58	(Italy) Scavolini Pesaro
Scoring by quarter: 37–25, 40–33

Palaverde, Treviso
Attendance: 4,500
