= Corny Thompson =

American basketball player (born 1960)

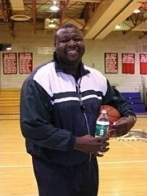

Personal information
- Born: February 5, 1960 (age 66) Middletown, Connecticut, U.S.
- Listed height: 6 ft 8 in (2.03 m)
- Listed weight: 225 lb (102 kg)

Career information
- High school: Middletown (Middletown, Connecticut)
- College: UConn (1978–1982)
- NBA draft: 1982: 3rd round, 50th overall pick
- Drafted by: Dallas Mavericks
- Playing career: 1982–1996
- Position: Power forward
- Number: 25

Career history

Playing
- 1982–1983: Dallas Mavericks
- 1983–1984: Detroit Spirits
- 1984–1990: Pallacanestro Varese
- 1990–1994: Joventut Badalona
- 1994–1996: León

Coaching
- 2011–present: Trotamundos de Carabobo

Career highlights
- Spanish League Finals MVP (1991); EuroLeague champion (1994); 2× First-team All-Big East (1981, 1982); Second-team All-Big East (1980); First-team Parade All-American (1978); McDonald's All-American (1978)
- Stats at NBA.com
- Stats at Basketball Reference

Cornelius Allen "Corny" Thompson (born February 5, 1960) is an American former professional basketball player. He was a 6’8” (203 cm) 225 lb (102 kg) power forward who occasionally also played the center position. Thomson was a member of the Joventut Badalona team that reached a EuroLeague final in 1992, and lifted the trophy in 1994.

== Early life ==
Corny started playing basketball because people suggested that he play because he was tall. He was about 6'5" before he got to High School. He wasn't serious about it until Middle School. From then on, every year, Corny progressed, went to camp and became a better player.

== High school ==
Corny attended Middletown High School in Middletown, Connecticut. In his freshman season, Corny was too good for the freshman team so he was promoted up to the Varsity team. The Varsity coach was Tom Labella. The team lost 5 or 6 games that year. In his sophomore through senior seasons the team won 76 games in a row. That record has still not been broken. The team won three State Championships and was ranked in the top 25 basketball teams in the country. Corny was the captain in the 1976, 1977, 1978 seasons (sophomore-senior). Corny still holds many records at Middletown High School.

== College career ==
North Carolina, Wesleyan, Virginia, Princeton and UConn were the schools Corny narrowed his decision down to. Corny liked the idea of staying close to home and he thought there would be advantages to being close to home. At Connecticut he was coached by Dom Perno. In his freshman season Corny started in every game, and the Huskies made the NCAA Tournament. Corny led the team in scoring all four years at UConn and finished with 1,810 points, and 1,017 rebounds. Corny graduated in 1982 with a degree in Business

== Professional career ==
Thompson was the 4th pick in the third round (50th overall) of the 1982 NBA draft by the Dallas Mavericks and played 44 games with them in the 1982–83 season, averaging 2.8 points, 2.7 rebounds and 0.8 assists per game. During the summer prior to his second year with the Mavericks, he suffered a knee injury, after which he was released from the team. Corny worked hard to get healthy and played basketball in Italy for Pallacanestro Varese in the Italian league for six years. It is when he played in the Spanish ACB League for a great Joventut Badalona team between 1990 and 1994 that he reached his full potential though, making it to the FIBA European League final in 1992 and winning the title in 1994.Tompson scoring the winning 3 point shot at the 1994 FIBA European League Final Four against Olympiacos.

== Career statistics ==
Legend
| GP | Games played | GS | Games started | MPG | Minutes per game |
| FG% | Field goal percentage | 3P% | 3-point field goal percentage | FT% | Free throw percentage |
| RPG | Rebounds per game | APG | Assists per game | SPG | Steals per game |
| BPG | Blocks per game | PPG | Points per game | **Bold** | Career high |

=== NBA ===
==== Regular season ====
| Year | Team | GP | GS | MPG | FG% | 3P% | FT% | RPG | APG | SPG | BPG | PPG |
|---|---|---|---|---|---|---|---|---|---|---|---|---|
| 1982–83 | Dallas | 44 | 2 | 11.8 | .314 | – | .783 | 2.7 | .8 | .3 | .2 | 2.8 |
