= Jordi Villacampa =

Spanish basketball player

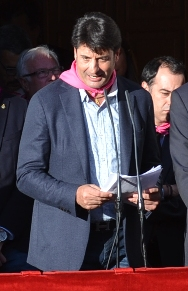
- Villacampa in 2014

Personal information
- Born: 11 October 1963 (age 63) Reus, Spain
- Listed height: 6 ft 5 in (1.96 m)
- Listed weight: 200 lb (91 kg)

Career information
- Playing career: 1980–1997
- Position: Shooting guard / small forward
- Number: 8

Career history
- 1980–1997: Joventut Badalona

Career highlights
- EuroLeague champion (1994); 3× FIBA European Selection (1990, 1991, 1995); 2× FIBA Korać Cup champion (1981, 1990); 2× Spanish League champion (1991, 1992); Spanish Cup winner (1997); Spanish Cup Finals Top Scorer (1986); 2× Spanish Supercup winner (1985, 1986); Spanish All-Star Game MVP (1987); No. 8 retired by Joventut Badalona; Spanish Basketball Hall of Fame (2025)
Medals
Men's basketball
Representing Spain
EuroBasket
Bronze medal – third place	1991 Italy

Jordi Villacampa Amorós (born 11 October 1963) is a Spanish retired professional basketball player of Joventut Badalona, and former chairman of the club. At 1.96 m (6 ft. 5 in.) tall, he played as a shooting guard-small forward. His main skills and attributes as a player were his speed and a good long-distance shot. Villacampa is widely considered one of the best European swingmen of his generation.

== Professional club career ==
For 21 years Villacampa was a high level player, playing always in the same club, Joventut de Badalona. He played for the first time with the senior men's professional team of Joventut Badalona at 16 years old, and he spent his entire career there, until he retired in 1997, at age 33, with a great homage being given to him on 22 December. During the years he played with Joventut Badalona, he won the EuroLeague, two Spanish League championships, as well as some other titles. With Joventut de Badalona, he played in 506 games in the Spanish ACB League, and scored 8,991 points, the second most in Spanish ACB League history.

He was named to the EuroLeague Final Four Team twice, at the 1992 FIBA European League Final Four and 1994 FIBA European League Final Fours.

Villacampa's number 8 Joventut Badalona jersey was retired in 1997, during a ceremony at the Pavelló Olímpic de Badalona.

== National team career ==
Villacampa played in 158 games internationally with the senior Spain men's national team (playing for the first time in 1984), playing in nearly all of the great international competitions of his playing era: 2 Summer Olympic Games (Seoul 1988, Barcelona 1992), 3 FIBA World Cups (1986, 1990, and 1994), and 4 EuroBaskets (1985, 1987, 1991, and 1993). His single-game scoring record with the Spain national team was 48 points, which he achieved in a game against Venezuela. The best team result that he achieved with Spain's national team was a bronze medal at the EuroBasket 1991, which took place in Rome.

== Post-playing career ==
In 2000, Villacampa became the team President of Joventut Badalona. As the team's President, he has won 2 Catalan League titles, the FIBA EuroChallenge, a Spanish Cup, and the Eurocup. He was able to return Joventut Badalona into being one of the better teams in the Spanish ACB League.

On 27 December 2016, Villacampa announced he would leave the office after 17 years at the helm of the club. He finally did it on 26 April 2017, with former player Juan Antonio Morales becoming the new president of Joventut Badalona.

== Clubs ==
- Club Joventut de Badalona: (youth categories)
- Club Joventut de Badalona: (senior men's team) 1980–1997

== Awards and accomplishments ==
=== Joventut Badalona ===
- 2× FIBA Korać Cup Champion: (1981, 1990)
- 7× Catalan League Champion: (1986, 1987, 1988, 1990, 1991, 1992, 1994)
- 3× Prince of Asturies Cup Champion: (1987, 1989, 1991)
- Spanish All-Star Game MVP (1987)
- FIBA Saporta Cup runner-up: (1988)
- 2× Spanish ACB League Champion: (1991, 1992)
- EuroLeague Champion: (1994)
  - EuroLeague runner-up: (1992)
- Spanish King's Cup Winner: (1997)
- No. 8 retired by Joventut Badalona

=== Spanish senior national team ===
- EuroBasket 1991 in Rome: Bronze
