= Menora Mivtachim Arena =

Sports and events arena in Tel Aviv, israel

Coordinates: 32°3′39.41″N 34°47′28.80″E

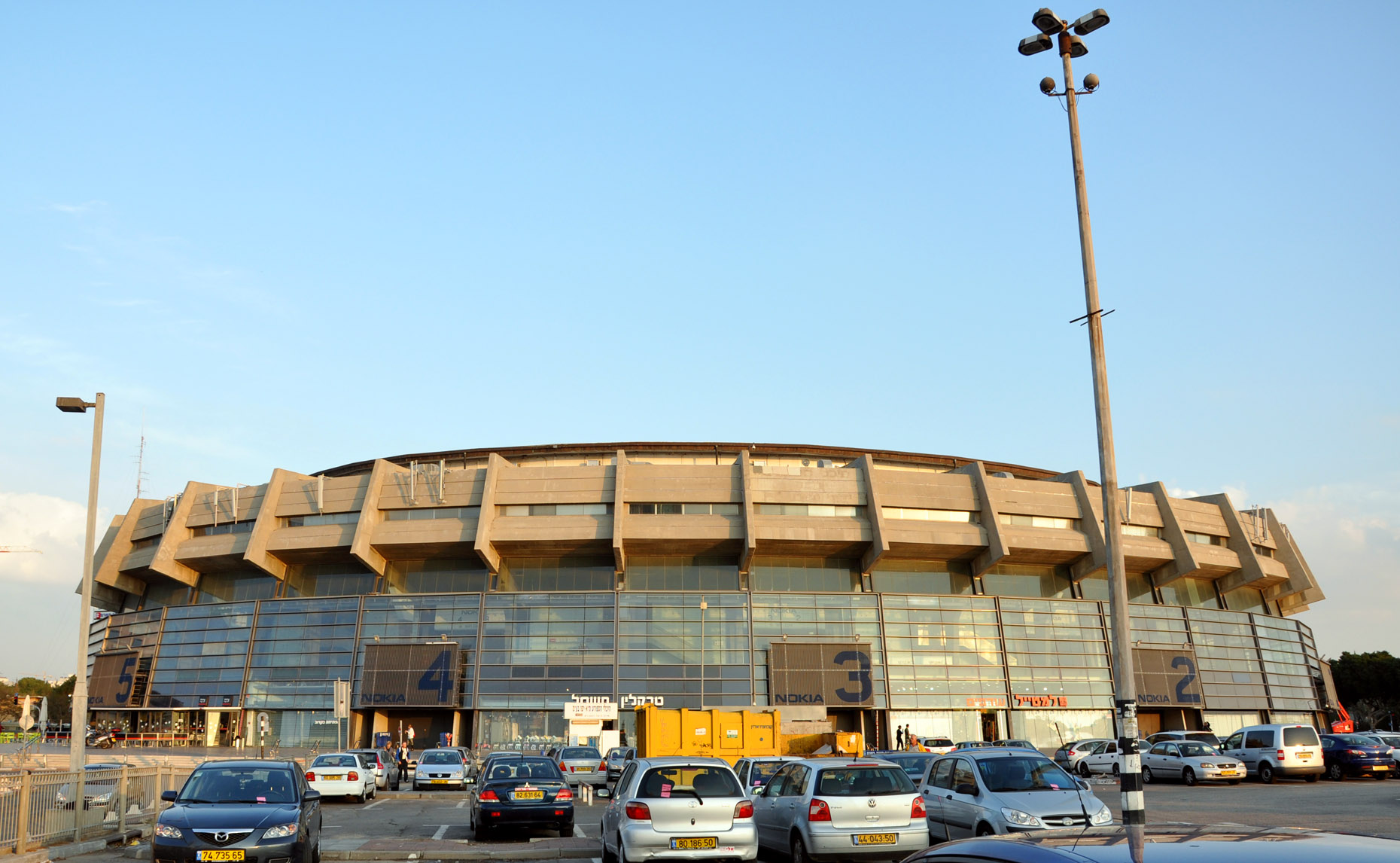
- Menora Mivtachim Arena's exterior (2011)
- Interactive map of Menora Mivtachim Arena
- Former names: Nokia Arena (2004–2014)
- Address: 51 Yigal Alon Street
- Location: Yad Eliyahu, Tel Aviv, Israel
- Owner: Tel Aviv-Yafo Municipality
- Operator: Sport Palaces Tel Aviv Yafo Ltd.
- Capacity: 10,383; Basketball: 10,728; Concerts: 8,000

Construction
- Opened: 17 September 1963
- Renovated: 1968–1971, 2005–2007
- Expanded: 1971, 2007

Tenants
- Maccabi Tel Aviv (1964–present); Hapoel Tel Aviv (2005–2006, 2025–present); Israeli national basketball team: Major sporting events hosted; 1972 FIBA European Champions Cup Final; 1991 EuroBasket Women; 1994 FIBA European League Final Four; 1997 FIBA EuroStars; 2004 Euroleague Final Four; EuroBasket 2017; 2021 FIBA Europe Cup Final Four

Website
- Menora Mivtachim Arena

Yad Eliyahu Arena (Hebrew: היכל יד אליהו), known as the Menora Mivtachim Arena (Hebrew: היכל מנורה מבטחים) and formerly as the Nokia Arena (Hebrew: היכל נוקיה) for commercial reasons, is a large multi-purpose sports indoor arena located in southeastern Tel Aviv, Israel. It primarily hosts tennis matches, basketball games, and concerts.

It is one of the major sporting facilities in the Greater Tel Aviv area. The arena is owned by the municipality of Tel Aviv, and is managed by Sports Palaces Ltd., a company also fully owned by the municipality (which also manages Bloomfield Stadium and Drive in Arena). On 1 January 2015, the arena changed its name to Menora Mivtachim Arena.

== History ==
The arena was opened on 17 September 1963, with a game between the national basketball teams of Israel and Yugoslavia, in which the latter won, by a score of 69–64. In its early years, the arena held a capacity of 5,000 spectators, with just concrete stands, without any seats, and a roof.

In 1972, a second floor of tiers was built, increasing the capacity to 10,000 spectators. The concrete stands were covered by seats, and the arena was covered with a roof. Further renovations through the years 2005–2007 modernized the arena further, added commercial facilities, and increased its capacity to 10,383 with permanent seating, 10,823 for basketball games, and 5,941 for concerts.

== Events ==
=== Sport ===
The arena is home to the Maccabi Tel Aviv basketball club, a member of the Maccabi Tel Aviv sports club. It has hosted the Israeli Super League final four, the Israeli State Cup final four, and most of the senior Israeli national basketball team's home games.

It hosted the FIBA EuroStars all-star game in 1997, the FIBA European Champions Cup (now called EuroLeague) Finals game of the 1971–72 season, and the EuroLeague Final Four in 1994 and 2004. The arena was also used to host one of the group stages of EuroBasket 2017, and the 2020–21 FIBA Europe Cup Final Four.

In other sports, it has also hosted a 1989 Davis Cup World Group match, between Israel and France, and the 2009 Davis Cup quarterfinals between Israel and Russia, in July 2009.

=== Entertainment ===
The arena has hosted various musical acts, such as: Erreway, Teen Angels, Lali, Scorpions, Paul Anka, Take That, Rod Stewart, Neil Sedaka, Cyndi Lauper, LMFAO, Westlife, Five, Philipp Kirkorov, Juan Luis Guerra, Natalia Oreiro, Alicia Keys, Charles Aznavour, Sean Paul, and Julio and Enrique Iglesias.

The Mamma Mia! international tour played 24 shows at the venue as well. The arena also hosted shows of the international tour Alegría, of Cirque du Soleil. On 19 and 20 December 2015 the arena hosted comedian Jerry Seinfeld, in his first live performance in Israel. All four shows of the comedian were sold out.

== Gallery ==
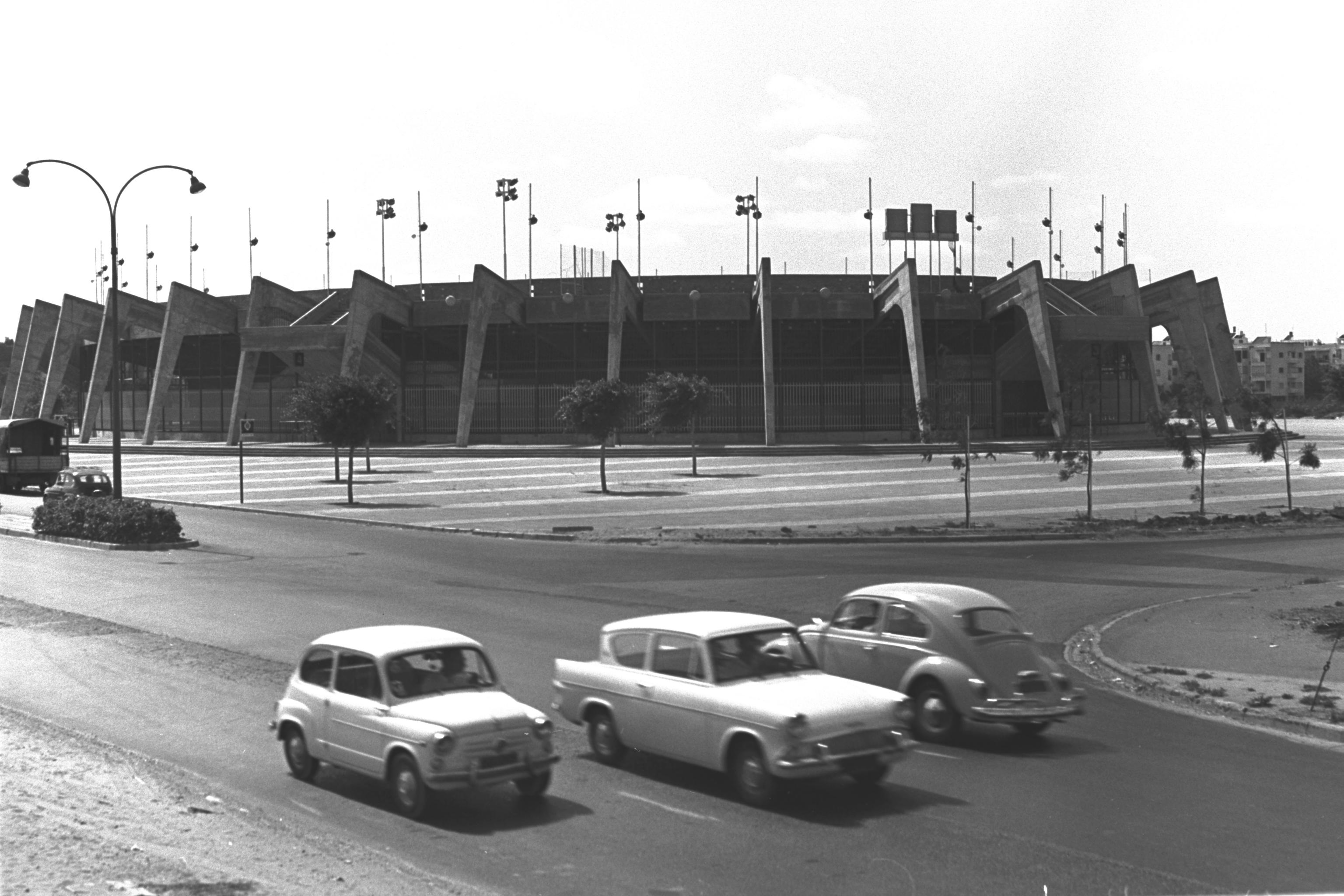

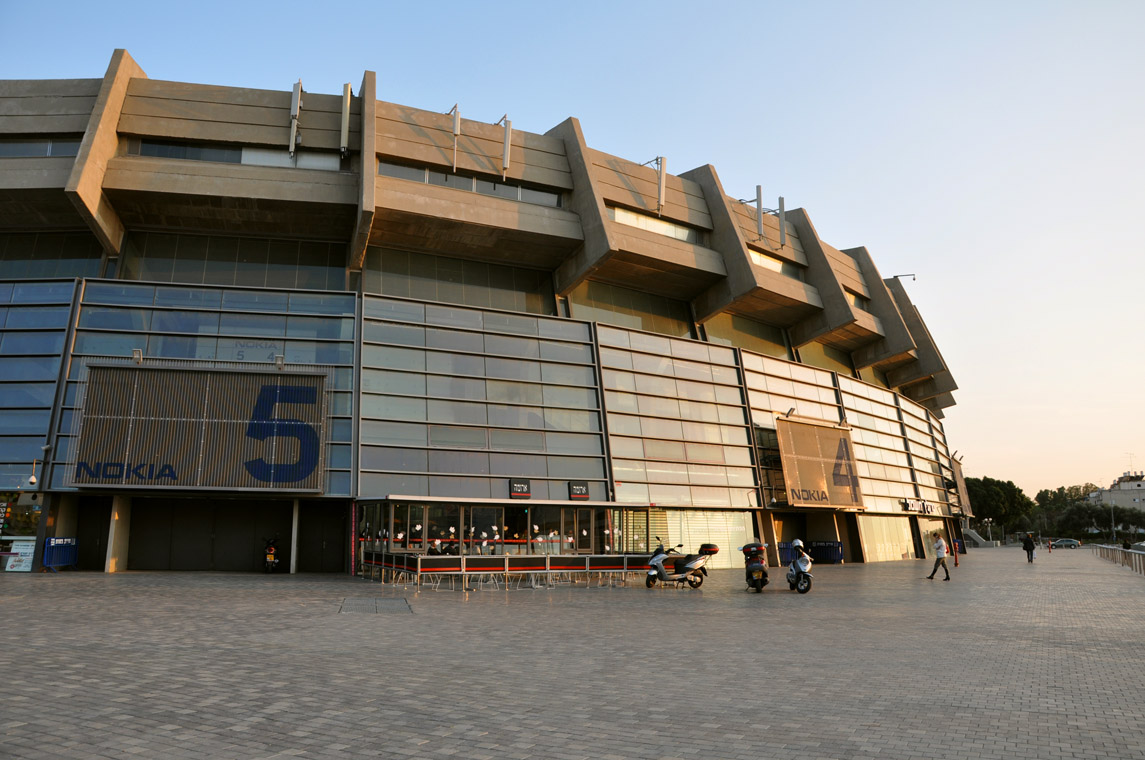

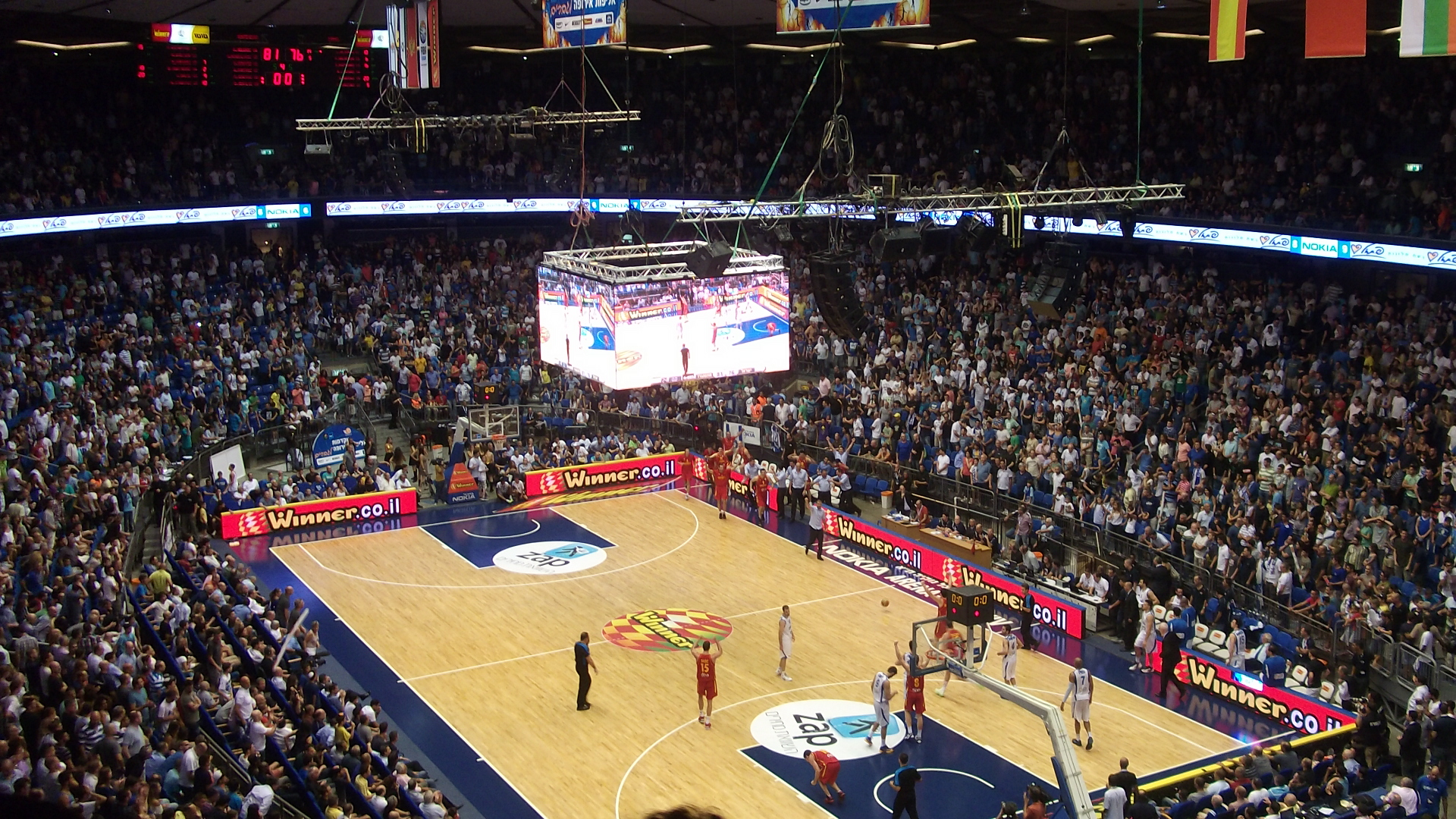

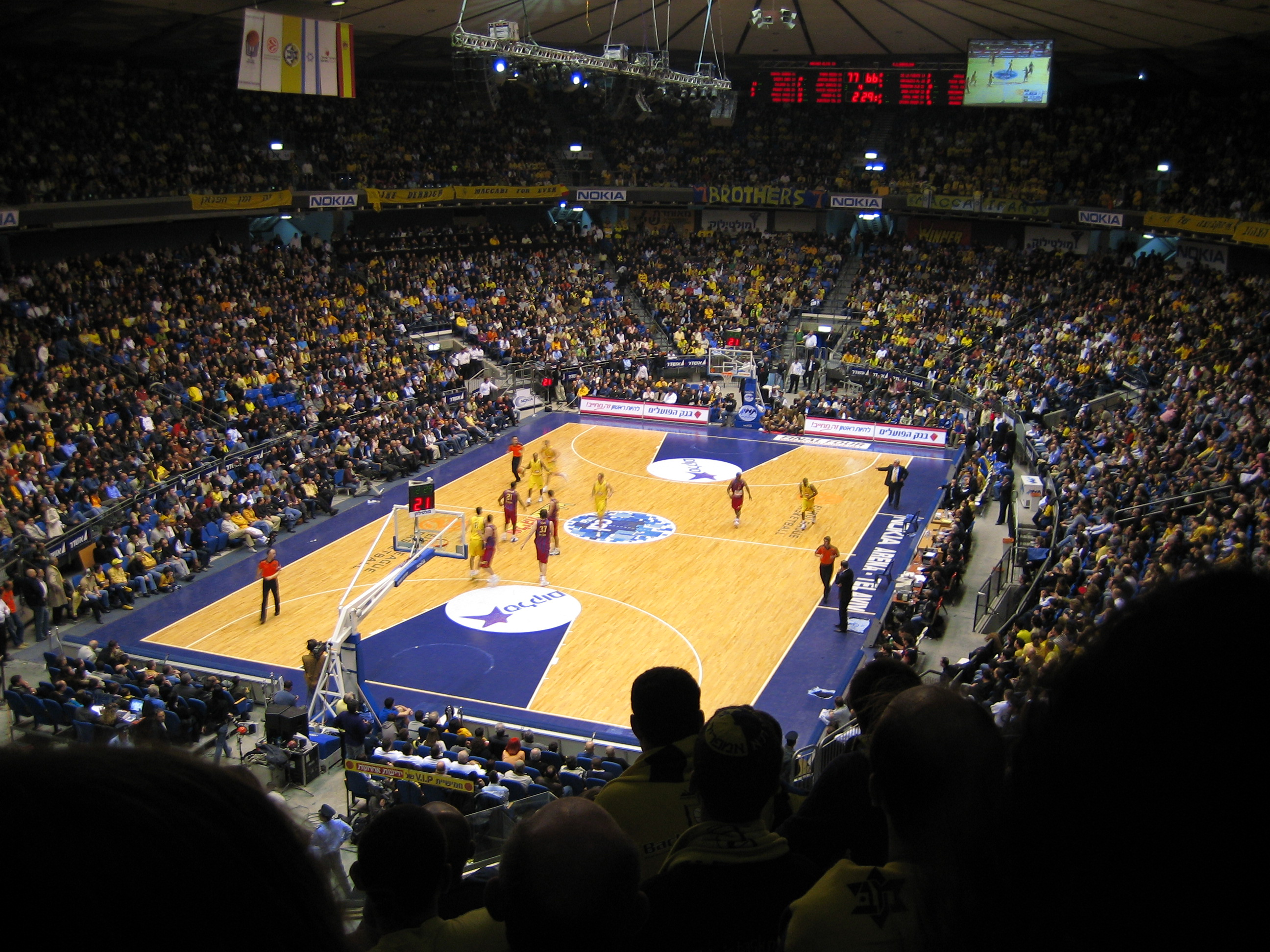

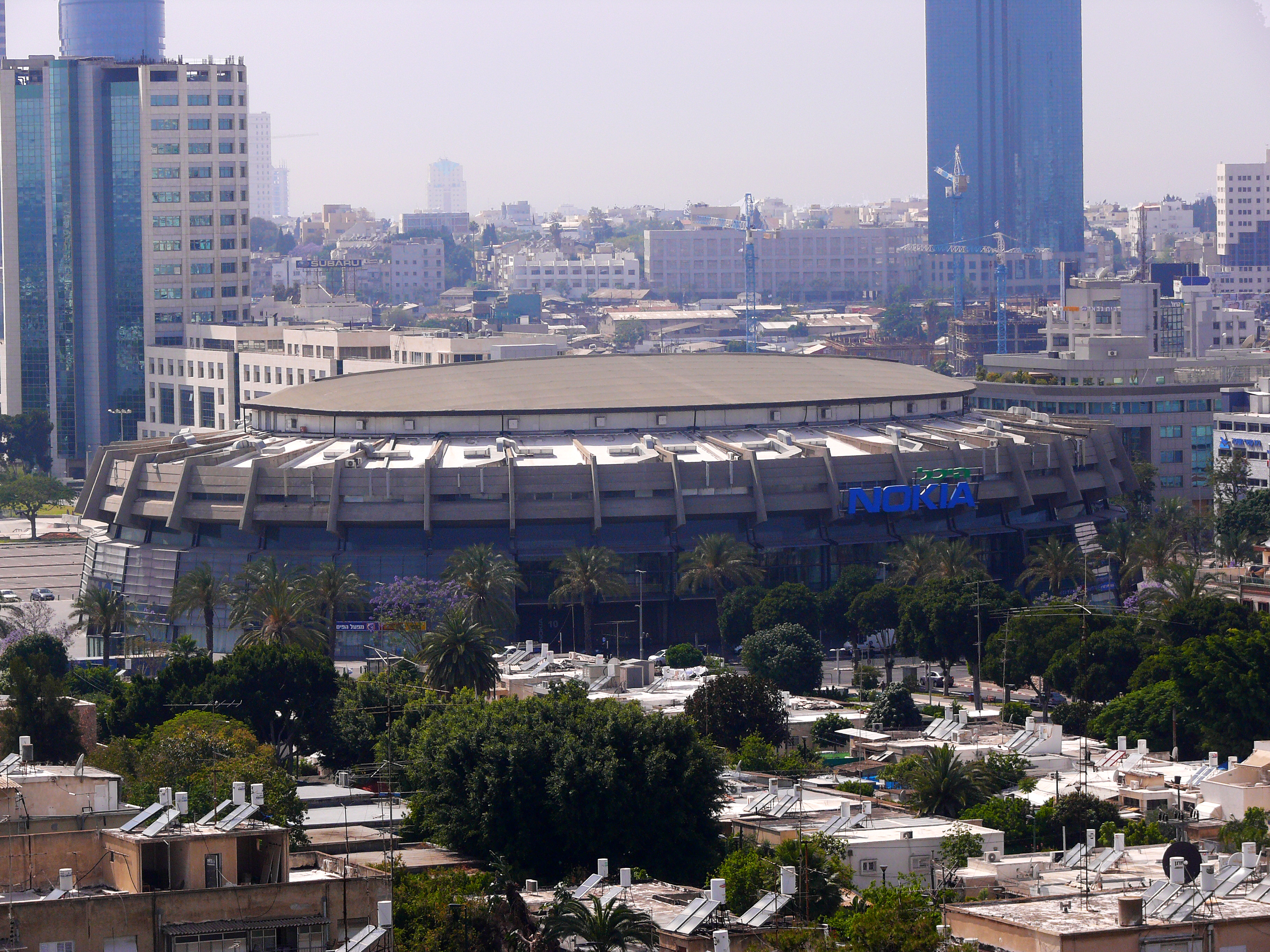

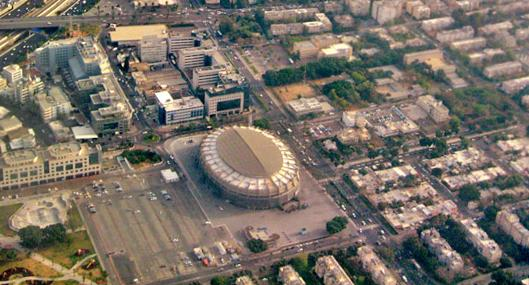

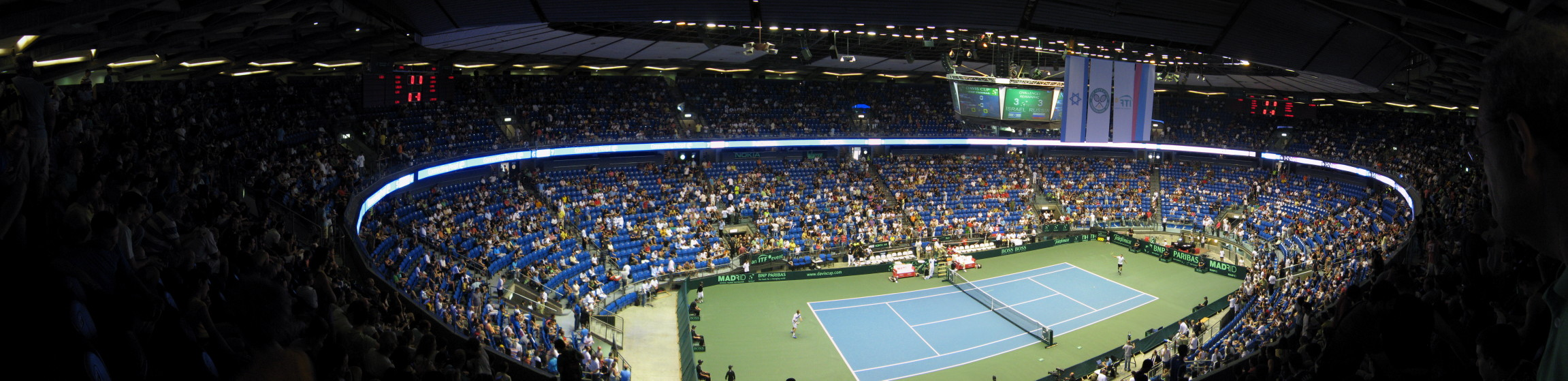

== See also ==
- List of indoor arenas in Israel
- Basketball in Israel

Events and tenants
Preceded by Sporthal Arena; Antwerp	FIBA European Champions Cup; Final Venue; 1972	Succeeded by Country Hall du Sart Tilman; Liège
Preceded by Peace and Friendship Stadium; Athens	FIBA European League; Final Four; Venue; 1994	Succeeded by Pabellón Príncipe Felipe; Zaragoza
Preceded by Abdi İpekçi Arena; Istanbul	FIBA EuroStars All-Star Game; Venue; 1997	Succeeded by Max Schmeling Halle; Berlin
Preceded by Palau Sant Jordi; Barcelona	EuroLeague; Final Four; Venue; 2004	Succeeded by Olimpiisky Arena; Moscow
Preceded by Not Held	FIBA Europe Cup; Final Four; Venue; 2021	Succeeded by Yet to be announced
