= Rafael Jofresa =

Spanish basketball player

Rafa Jofresa
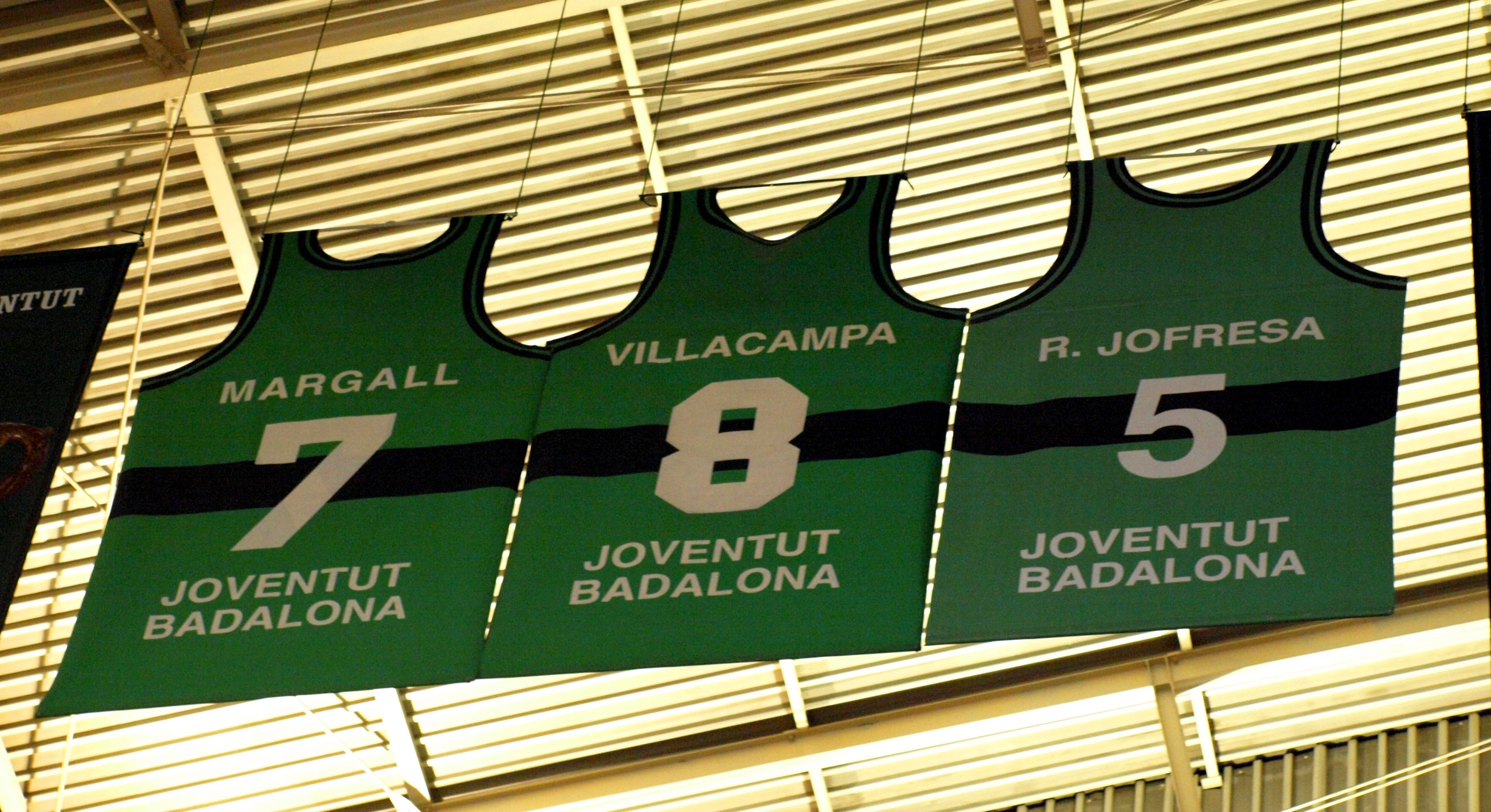

Personal information
- Born: 2 September 1966 (age 60) Barcelona, Spain
- Listed height: 6 ft 0 in (1.83 m)
- Listed weight: 180 lb (82 kg)

Career information
- NBA draft: 1988: undrafted
- Playing career: 1983–2003
- Position: Point guard
- Number: 5

Career history
- 1983–1996: Joventut Badalona
- 1996–1998: FC Barcelona
- 1998–1999: CB Girona
- 1999–2003: Joventut Badalona

Career highlights
- EuroLeague champion (1994); FIBA European Selection (1995); FIBA Korać Cup champion (1990); 3× Spanish League champion (1991, 1992, 1997); No. 5 retired by Joventut Badalona
Medals
Men's basketball
Representing Spain
EuroBasket
Bronze medal – third place	1991 Italy
FIBA Europe Under-16 Championship
Silver medal – second place	1983 West Germany	{{{2}}}

Rafael "Rafa" Jofresa Prats (born 2 September 1966 in Barcelona, Catalonia) is a Spanish retired professional basketball player. At a height of 1.83 m (6 ft 0 in) tall, he played at the point guard position.

== Professional career ==
Jofresa played in 756 games (the 2nd-most all-time) in the top-tier level Spanish ACB League. He was a member of the FIBA European Selection team, in 1995.

== National team career ==
Jofresa was a member of the senior Spain national basketball team. He had 75 appearances with Spain's senior national team. He won a bronze medal at the 1991 EuroBasket.

== Personal life ==
Jofresa's brother, Tomás, was also a professional basketball player.

== Awards and titles won ==
=== Spain ===
- Liga ACB (Spanish League) (3): 1990–91, 1991–92, 1996–97
- Copa Príncipe de Asturias (Spanish Prince's Cup) (2): 1986–87, 1988–89, 1990–91

=== Europe ===
- FIBA Korać Cup (1): 1989–90
- EuroLeague (1): 1993–94
