= Juan Antonio Morales (basketball) =

Spanish basketball player

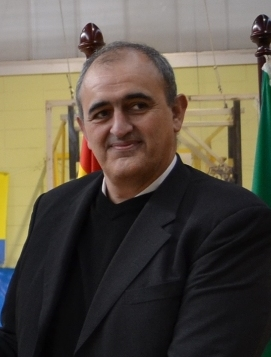

Personal information
- Born: April 18, 1969 (age 57) Bilbao, Spain
- Listed height: 6 ft 11 in (2.11 m)

Career information
- Playing career: 1986–2003
- Position: Center

Career history
- 1986–1987: Loyola Bilbao
- 1987–1995: Joventut Badalona
- 1995–1997: Real Madrid
- 1997–1999: PAOK
- 1999–2000: Saski Baskonia
- 2000–2001: Panionios
- 2001–2002: PAOK
- 2002: Basket Rimini Crabs
- 2002–2003: Olympiacos

Career highlights
- EuroLeague champion (1994); FIBA Korać Cup champion (1990); European Cup Winner's Cup champion (1997); 2× Spanish League champion (1991,1992); Greek Cup winner (1999)
Medals
Representing Spain
Men's basketball
Mediterranean Games
Silver medal – second place	1987 Syria	Spain National Team
European Championship for Cadets
Silver medal – second place	1985 Bulgaria	National Team

Juan Antonio Morales (born April 18, 1969) is a Spanish former professional basketball player.

== Professional career ==
Morales started his career from the local club Loyola Bilbao. In 1987 he transferred to Joventut Badalona. He played eight years with the Catalan club and he won two Spanish Championship, the Korac Cup and EuroLeague. He continued his career in Real Madrid Baloncesto from 1995 to 1997; he completed his collection with European titles with FIBA Saporta Cup in 1997. Morales also played three years in the whole with P.A.O.K. BC, Saski Baskonia, Panionios B.C., Basket Rimini Crabs and Olympiacos B.C. His last title was the Greek Basketball Cup in 1999. He end his career in 1999, playing with Olympiakos.

== National team ==
Morales played with Spain men's national basketball team in 1988 FIBA World Olympic Qualifying Tournament, but his missed the Olympic tournament due to a serious ankle injury. He also took part at the EuroBasket 1989 and EuroBasket 1993. Moreover, he won the silver medal in 1987 Mediterranean Games and 1985 FIBA Europe Under-16 Championship
