= Maccabi Tel Aviv B.C. past rosters =

Israeli baseball teams

This is the listings of past rosters of Maccabi Tel Aviv.

== 1976–77 ==
Titles

- (European Union) European Champions Cup Champion
- (Israel) Israeli League Champion
- (Israel) Israeli State Cup Champion

Roster

- (United States) (Israel) Aulcie Perry
- (United States) (Israel) Eric Minkin
- (United States) (Israel) Bob Griffin
- (United States) Jim Boatwright
- (United States) (Israel) Tal Brody (C)
- (United States) (Israel) Lou Silver
- (Israel) Motti Aroesti
- (Israel) Miki Berkovich
- (Israel) Shuki Schwartz
- (Israel) Eyal Yaffe
- (Israel) Hanan Indibo
- (Israel) Eran Arad
- Coach: (Israel) Ralph Klein
- Assistant Coach: (Israel) Aryeh Davidescu

Source: 1977 Roster, Maccabi Tel Aviv website

== 1977–78 ==
Titles

- (Israel) Israeli League Champion
- (Israel) Israeli State Cup Champion

Honors

- (European Union) European Champions Cup Semi Finalist (3rd)

Roster

- (United States) (Israel) Tal Brody (C)
- (United States) (Israel) Aulcie Perry
- (United States) Jim Boatwright
- (United States) (Israel) Lou Silver
- (Israel) Motti Aroesti
- (Israel) Miki Berkovich
- (United States) (Israel) Bob Griffin
- (Israel) Shuki Schwartz
- (United States) (Israel) Eric Minkin
- (Israel) Hanan Keren
- (United States) Bob Fleischer
- Coach: (Israel) Ralph Klein
- Assistant Coach: (Israel) Aryeh Davidescu

Source: 1978 Roster, Maccabi Tel Aviv website

== 1978–79 ==
Titles

- (Israel) Israeli League Champion
- (Israel) Israeli State Cup Champion

Honors

- (European Union) European Champions Cup Semi Finalist (3rd)

Roster

- (United States) (Israel) Tal Brody (C)
- (United States) (Israel) Aulcie Perry
- (United States) Jim Boatwright
- (United States) (Israel) Lou Silver
- (Israel) Motti Aroesti
- (Israel) Miki Berkovich
- (United States) Paul McCracken
- (Israel) Shuki Schwartz
- (United States) (Israel) Eric Minkin
- (Israel) Hanan Keren
- Coach: (Israel) Ralph Klein
- Assistant Coach: (Israel) Aryeh Davidescu

Source: 1979 Roster, Maccabi Tel Aviv website

== 1979–80 ==
Titles

- (Israel) Israeli League Champion
- (Israel) Israeli State Cup Champion

Honors

- (European Union) European Champions Cup Runner-Up

Roster

- (United States) Jim Boatwright (C)
- (United States) (Israel) Lou Silver
- (Israel) Miki Berkovich
- (United States) (Israel) Aulcie Perry
- (United States) (Israel) Earl Williams
- (Israel) Motti Aroesti
- (Israel) Shuki Schwartz
- (Israel) Hanan Keren
- (Israel) Shmuel Zysman
- (Israel) Hanan Dobrish
- (Israel) Moshe Shabtay
- (Israel) Amnon Garah
- Coach: (Israel) Ralph Klein
- Assistant Coach: (Israel) Aryeh Davidescu

Source: 1980 Roster, Maccabi Tel Aviv website

== 1980–81 ==
Titles

- (European Union) European Champions Cup Champion
- (European Union) FIBA Intercontinental Cup Champion
- (Israel) Israeli League Champion
- (Israel) Israeli State Cup Champion

Roster

- (United States) (Israel) Aulcie Perry
- (United States) (Israel) Earl Williams
- (United States) Jim Boatwright (C)
- (Israel) Hanan Dobrish
- (Israel) Hanan Keren
- (United States) (Israel) Lou Silver
- (Israel) Motti Aroesti
- (Israel) Miki Berkovich
- (Israel) Moshe Hershkovitz
- (Israel) Shuki Schwartz
- (Israel) Shmuel Zysman
- (Israel) Amnon Garah
- Coach: (United States) Rudy D'Amico
- Assistant Coach: (Israel) Zvi Sherf

Source: 1981 Roster, Maccabi Tel Aviv website

== 1981–82 ==
Titles

- (Israel) Israeli League Champion
- (Israel) Israeli State Cup Champion

Honors

- (European Union) European Champions Cup Runner-Up

Roster

- (United States) (Israel) Lou Silver (C)
- (Israel) Miki Berkovich
- (United States) (Israel) Aulcie Perry
- (United States) Earl Williams
- (Israel) Motti Aroesti
- (Israel) Hanan Keren
- (Israel) Moshe Hershkovitz
- (United States) Jack Zimmerman
- (United States) (Israel) Howard Lassoff
- (Israel) Haim Markovich
- (Israel) Yuval Ben-Mordechai
- (Israel) Baruch Smoler
- (Israel) Itamar Stern
- (Israel) Dror Tzeplovich
- Coach: (Israel) Ralph Klein
- Assistant Coach: (Israel) Tal Brody

Source: 1982 Roster, Maccabi Tel Aviv website

== 1982–83 ==
Titles

- (Israel) Israeli League Champion
- (Israel) Israeli State Cup Champion

Honors

- (European Union) European Champions Cup Quarter-Finalist (5th)

Roster

- (United States) (Israel) Lou Silver (C)
- (Israel) Miki Berkovich
- (United States) (Israel) Aulcie Perry
- (United States) Earl Williams
- (Israel) Motti Aroesti
- (Israel) Moshe Hershkovitz
- (United States) Jack Zimmerman
- (United States) (Israel) Howard Lassoff
- (Israel) Yuval Ben-Mordechai
- (Israel) Baruch Smoler
- (Israel) Itamar Stern
- (Israel) Yoav Kadman
- Coach: (Israel) Ralph Klein
- Assistant Coach: (Israel) Tal Brody

Source: 1983 Roster, Maccabi Tel Aviv website

== 1983–84 ==
Titles

- (Israel) Israeli League Champion

Honors

- (European Union) European Champions Cup 5th Place

Roster

- (United States) (Israel) Lou Silver (C)
- (Israel) Miki Berkovich
- (United States) (Israel) Aulcie Perry
- (United States) Frank Brykovsky
- (Israel) Motti Aroesti
- (Israel) Moshe Hershkovitz
- (United States) Joel Kremer
- (United States) (Israel) Howard Lassoff
- (Israel) Yuval Ben-Mordechai
- (Israel) Baruch Smoler
- (Israel) Chen Lipin
- (Israel) Yoav Kadman
- Coach: (Israel) Zvi Sherf
- Assistant Coach: (Israel) Moshe Weinkrantz

Source: 1984 Roster, Maccabi Tel Aviv website

== 1984–85 ==
Titles

- (Israel) Israeli League Champion
- (Israel) Israeli State Cup Champion

Honors

- (European Union) European Champions Cup Semi Finalist (3rd)

Roster

- (United States) (Israel) Aulcie Perry
- (United States) (Israel) Lou Silver
- (United States) Lee Johnson
- (United States) (Israel) Howard Lassoff
- (United States) Kevin Magee
- (Israel) Yitzhak Cohen
- (Israel) Haim Markovich
- (Israel) Motti Aroesti
- (Israel) Miki Berkovich (C)
- (Israel) Moshe Hershkovitz
- (Israel) Chen Lipin
- (Israel) Yoav Kadman
- Coach: (Israel) Zvi Sherf
- Assistant Coach: (Israel) Moshe Weinkrantz

Source: 1985 Roster, Maccabi Tel Aviv website

== 1985–86 ==
Titles

- (Israel) Israeli League Champion
- (Israel) Israeli State Cup Champion

Honors

- (European Union) European Champions Cup Quarter-Finalist (5th)

Roster

- (United States) Lee Johnson
- (United States) (Israel) Corky Nelson
- (Israel) Doron Jamchi
- (Israel) Ron Strichman
- (Israel) Miki Berkovich (C)
- (Israel) Motti Aroesti
- (Israel) Ido Steinberger
- (Israel) Chen Lipin
- (Israel) Lior Arditi
- (Israel) Yitzhak Cohen
- (United States) Kevin Magee
- (United States) (Israel) Howard Lassoff
- Coach: (Israel) Zvi Sherf
- Assistant Coach: (Israel) Moshe Weinkrantz

Source: 1986 Roster, Maccabi Tel Aviv website

== 1986–87 ==
Titles

- (Israel) Israeli League Champion
- (Israel) Israeli State Cup Champion

Honors

- (European Union) European Champions Cup Runner-Up

Roster

- (United States) Kevin Magee
- (United States) (Israel) Greg Cornelius
- (United States) Lee Johnson
- (United States) (Israel) Howard Lassoff
- (Israel) Meir Kaminsky
- (Israel) Doron Jamchi
- (Israel) Chen Lipin
- (Israel) Avi Schiller
- (Israel) Lior Arditi
- (Israel) Miki Berkovich (C)
- (Israel) Motti Aroesti
- (Israel) Ido Steinberger
- Coach: (Israel) Zvi Sherf
- Assistant Coach: (Israel) Yair Sharon

Source: 1987 Roster, Maccabi Tel Aviv website

== 1987–88 ==
Titles

- (Israel) Israeli League Champion

Honors

- (European Union) European Champions Cup Runner-Up

Roster

- (United States) Kevin Magee
- (United States) (Israel) Greg Cornelius
- (United States) Ken Barlow
- (United States) (Israel) Willie Sims
- (Israel) Motti Daniel
- (Israel) Doron Jamchi
- (Israel) Chen Lipin
- (Israel) Itzhak Cohen
- (Israel) Gilad Katz
- (Israel) Shay Sidelman
- (Israel) Miki Berkovich (C)
- (Israel) Motti Aroesti
- Coach: (Israel) Ralph Klein

Source: 1988 Roster, Maccabi Tel Aviv website

== 1988–89 ==
Titles

- (Israel) Israeli League Champion
- (Israel) Israeli State Cup Champion

Honors

- (European Union) European Champions Cup Runner-Up

Roster

- (Israel) Doron Jamchi (C)
- (United States) Kevin Magee
- (Israel) Yitzhak Cohen
- (United States) (Israel) LaVon Mercer
- (United States) (Israel) Motti Daniel
- (United States) Ken Barlow
- (Israel) Uri Buch
- (United States) (Israel) Lazy Gordon
- (Israel) Gilad Katz
- (Israel) Chen Lipin
- (United States) (Israel) Willie Sims
- (Israel) Eran Bergstein
- Coach: (Israel) Zvi Sherf
- Assistant Coach: (Israel) Yair Sharon

Source: 1989 Roster, Maccabi Tel Aviv website

== 1989–90 ==
Titles

- (Israel) Israeli League Champion
- (Israel) Israeli State Cup Champion

Honors

- (European Union) European Champions Cup Quarter-Finalist (6th)

Roster

- (Israel) Doron Jamchi (C)
- (United States) Kevin Magee
- (Israel) Yitzhak Cohen
- (United States) (Israel) LaVon Mercer
- (Israel) Dror Berditchev
- (United States) Ken Barlow
- (Israel) Chen Lipin
- (United States) (Israel) Willie Sims
- (Israel) Gilad Katz
- (United States) (Israel) Motti Daniel]
- (Israel) Hillel Cohen
- (United States) (Israel) Lazy Gordon
- Coach: (United States) Ted Owens
- Assistant Coach: (Israel) Motti Aroesti

Source: 1990 Roster, Maccabi Tel Aviv website

== 1990–91 ==
Titles

- (Israel) Israeli League Champion
- (Israel) Israeli State Cup Champion

Honors

- (European Union) European Champions Cup Semi Finalist (3rd)

Roster

- (Israel) Doron Jamchi (C)
- (United States) Ed Horton
- (Israel) Yitzhak Cohen
- (United States) (Israel) LaVon Mercer
- (Israel) Dror Berditchev
- (United States) Donald Royal
- (Israel) Chen Lipin
- (United States) (Israel) Willie Sims
- (Israel) Guy Goodes
- (Israel) Motti Daniel
- (Israel) Nadav Henefeld
- (Israel) Harel Gadot
- Coach: (Israel) Zvi Sherf
- Assistant Coach: (Israel) Yaakov Adler

Source: 1991 Roster, Maccabi Tel Aviv website

== 1991–92 ==
Titles

- (Israel) Israeli League Champion

Honors

- (European Union) European Champions Cup Quarter Finalist

Roster

- (Israel) Doron Jamchi (C)
- (United States) Mike Mitchell
- (Israel) Yitzhak Cohen
- (United States) (Israel) LaVon Mercer
- (Israel) Dror Berditchev
- (Dominican Republic) José Vargas
- (Israel) Chen Lipin
- (United States) (Israel) Willie Sims
- (Israel) Guy Goodes
- (Israel) Motti Daniel
- (Israel) Nadav Henefeld
- (Israel) Eliezar Cohen
- Coach: (Israel) Zvi Sherf
- Assistant Coach: (Israel) Yaakov Adler
- Team Manager: (Israel) Moni Fanan

Source: 1992 Roster, Maccabi Tel Aviv website

== 1992–93 ==
Honors

- (Israel) Israeli League Semi Finalist (3rd)
- (European Union) European Champions Cup Regular season

Roster

- (Israel) Doron Jamchi (C)
- (United States) Winfred King
- (Israel) Uri Cohen-Mintz
- (United States) (Israel) LaVon Mercer
- (United States) Dyron Nix
- (Israel) Alon Ben Zaken
- (Israel) Eyal Sayar
- (Israel) Guy Goodes
- (Israel) Motti Daniel
- (Dominican Republic) José Vargas
- (Israel) Nadav Henefeld
- (Israel) Koren Amisha
- (United States) David Ancrum
- (Israel) Motti Ben Bassat
- Coach: (Israel) Eli Kaneti
- Assistant Coach: (Israel) Yaacov Adler
- Team Manager: (Israel) Moni Fanan

Source: 1993 Roster, Maccabi Tel Aviv website

== 1993–94 ==
Titles

- (Israel) Israeli League Champion
- (Israel) Israeli State Cup Champion

Honors

- (European Union) Korać Cup Quarter Finalist

Roster

- (Israel) Doron Jamchi (C)
- (United States) Spencer Dunkley
- (Israel) Dudi Adler
- (United States) (Israel) LaVon Mercer
- (United States) Terry Fire
- Israel Elimelech
- (Israel) Eyal Sayar
- (Israel) Guy Goodes
- (Israel) Motti Daniel
- (Israel) Nadav Henefeld
- (United States) Wendell Alexis
- (Israel) Alon Ben-Zaken
- Coach: (Israel) Muli Katzurin
- Assistant Coach: (Israel) Yoram Harush
- Team Manager: (Israel) Moni Fanan

Source: 1994 Roster, Maccabi Tel Aviv website

== 1994-95 ==
Titles

- (Israel) Israeli League Champion

Honors

- (European Union) Euroleague Round of 16

Roster

- (Israel) Doron Jamchi (C)
- (United States) Norris Coleman
- (Israel) Assaf Dotan
- (United States) Terry Fire
- Israel Elimelech
- (Israel) Vicky Revach
- (Israel) Guy Goodes
- (Israel) Motti Daniel
- (Israel) Nadav Henefeld
- (Federal Republic of Yugoslavia) (Israel) Radisav Ćurčić
- (Israel) Alon Ben-Zaken
- (Israel) Jeff Kent
- (Israel) Omer Bradly
- Coach: (Israel) Muli Katzurin
- Assistant Coach: (Israel) Yoram Harush
- Team Manager: (Israel) Moni Fanan

Source: 1995 Roster, Maccabi Tel Aviv website

== 1995–96 ==
Titles

- (Israel) Israeli League Champion

Honors

- Israel State Cup Finalist
- (European Union) Euroleague Quarter Finalist

Roster

- (Israel) Doron Jamchi
- (Federal Republic of Yugoslavia) (Israel) Radisav Ćurčić
- (United States) (Israel) Brad Leaf
- (Israel) Guy Goodes
- (Israel) Motti Daniel
- (Israel) Nadav Henefeld (C)
- (United States) Tom Chambers
- (Israel) Oded Kattash
- (Israel) Tomer Steinhauer
- (United States) (Israel) Josh Oppenheimer
- (Israel) Barak Ozan
- (Israel) Gilad Katz
- Coach: (Israel) Ralph Klein (till mid-season)
- Coach: (Israel) Zvi Sherf (to the rest of the season)
- Assistant Coach: (Israel) Yoram Harush
- Team Manager: (Israel) Moni Fanan

Source: 1996 Roster, Maccabi Tel Aviv website

== 1996–97 ==
Titles

- (Israel) Israeli League Champion

Honors

- Israel State Cup Finalist
- (European Union) Euroleague Round of 16

Roster

- (United States) Buck Johnson
- (Federal Republic of Yugoslavia) (Israel) Velibor Radović
- (Romania) (Israel) Constantin Popa
- (United States) (Israel) Brad Leaf
- (United States) (Israel) Derrick Sharp
- (Israel) Doron Sheffer
- (United States) (Israel) Eric Gingold
- (Israel) Nadav Henefeld (C)
- (United States) Randy White
- (Israel) Oded Kattash
- (Israel) Eyal Sayar
- (Israel) Guy Goodes
- (Israel) Guy Zano
- (Israel) Barak Ozan
- Coach: (Israel) Zvi Sherf
- Assistant Coach: (Israel) Yoram Harush
- Team Manager: (Israel) Moni Fanan

Source: 1997 Roster, Maccabi Tel Aviv website

== 1997–98 ==
Titles

- (Israel) Israeli League Champion
- (Israel) Israeli State Cup Champion

Honors

- (European Union) Euroleague Round of 16

Roster

- (United States) Rashard Griffith
- (Federal Republic of Yugoslavia) (Israel) Velibor Radović
- (Romania) (Israel) Constantin Popa
- (United States) (Israel) Brad Leaf
- (United States) (Israel) Derrick Sharp
- (Israel) Doron Sheffer
- (Israel) Andrey Zalinbaba
- (Israel) Nadav Henefeld (C)
- (United States) Randy White
- (Israel) Oded Kattash
- (Israel) Elad Savion
- (Israel) Gadi Yarom
- (Canada) (Israel) Barry Shramban
- Coach: (Slovenia) Vinko Jelovac
- Assistant Coach: (Israel) Yoram Harush
- Team Manager: (Israel) Moni Fanan

Source: 1998 Roster, Maccabi Tel Aviv website

== 1998–99 ==
Titles

- (Israel) Israeli League Champion
- (Israel) Israeli State Cup Champion

Honors

- (European Union) Euroleague Round of 16

Roster

- (United States) David Benoit
- (Federal Republic of Yugoslavia) (Israel) Velibor Radović
- (Romania) (Israel) Constantin Popa
- (Israel) Gur Shelef
- (United States) (Israel) Derrick Sharp
- (Israel) Doron Sheffer
- (Israel) Guy Goodes
- (Israel) Nadav Henefeld (C)
- (United States) Victor Alexander
- (Israel) Oded Kattash
- (Federal Republic of Yugoslavia) Zdravko Radulović
- (Federal Republic of Yugoslavia) Nikola Lončar
- (Israel) Avi Kazarnovski
- (United States) Willie Anderson
- (Canada) (Israel) Barry Shramban
- Coach: (Israel) Yoram Harush (to November 1998)
- Coach: (Israel) Pini Gershon (from November 1998)
- Assistant Coach: (United States) (Israel) Brad Leaf
- Team Manager: (Israel) Moni Fanan

Source: 1999 Roster, Maccabi Tel Aviv website

== 1999–2000 ==
Titles

- (Israel) Israeli League Champion
- (Israel) Israeli State Cup Champion

Honors

- (European Union) Euroleague Runner-Up

Roster

- (United States) Dallas Comegys
- (United States) (Slovenia) Ariel McDonald
- (Romania) (Israel) Constantin Popa
- (Israel) Gur Shelef
- (United States) (Israel) Derrick Sharp
- (Israel) Doron Sheffer
- (United States) (Israel) Mark Brisker
- (Israel) Nadav Henefeld (C)
- (United States) Nate Huffman
- (Israel) Doron Jamchi
- (Israel) Avi Kazarnovski
- (Israel) Dudu Asraf
- (Israel) Itzhak Cohen
- Coach: (Israel) Pini Gershon
- Assistant Coach: (United States) (Israel) David Blatt
- Team Manager: (Israel) Moni Fanan

Source: 2000 Roster, Maccabi Tel Aviv website

== 2000–01 ==
Titles

- (European Union) Suproleague Champion
- (Israel) Israeli League Champion
- (Israel) Israeli State Cup Champion

Roster

- (United States) Anthony Parker
- (United States) (Slovenia) Ariel McDonald
- (Federal Republic of Yugoslavia) (Israel) Velibor Radović
- (Israel) Gur Shelef
- (United States) (Israel) Derrick Sharp
- (Israel) Tal Burstein
- (United States) (Israel) Mark Brisker
- (Israel) Nadav Henefeld (C)
- (United States) Nate Huffman
- (Federal Republic of Yugoslavia) (Israel) Radisav Ćurčić
- (Israel) Elad Savion
- (United States) (Israel) David Sternlight
- (Israel) Regev Fanan
- Coach: (Israel) Pini Gershon
- Assistant Coach: (United States) (Israel) David Blatt
- Team Manager: (Israel) Moni Fanan

Source: 2001 Roster, Maccabi Tel Aviv website

== 2001–02 ==
Titles

- (Israel) Israeli League Champion
- (Israel) Israeli State Cup Champion

Honors

- (European Union) Euroleague Semi Finalist (4th)

Roster

- (United States) Anthony Parker
- (United States) (Slovenia) Ariel McDonald
- (Israel) Yotam Halperin
- (Israel) Gur Shelef
- (United States) (Israel) Derrick Sharp
- (Israel) Tal Burstein
- (United States) (Israel) Mark Brisker
- (Israel) Nadav Henefeld (C)
- (United States) Nate Huffman
- (Federal Republic of Yugoslavia) (Israel) Radisav Ćurčić
- (Israel) Yoav Saffar
- (Turkey) Hüseyin Beşok
- Coach: (United States) (Israel) David Blatt
- Assistant Coach: (United States) Charles Barton
- Team Manager: (Israel) Moni Fanan

Source: 2002 Roster, Maccabi Tel Aviv website

== 2002/03 ==
Titles

- (Israel) Israeli League Champion
- (Israel) Israeli State Cup Champion

Honors

- (European Union) Euroleague Top-16
- (European Union) Adriatic League Finalist

Roster

- (Israel) Lior Lubin
- (United States) Quincy Lewis
- (United States) (Israel) Derrick Sharp
- (Croatia) Nikola Vujčić
- (United States) Marcus Goree
- (Israel) Gur Shelef (C)
- (Israel) Tal Burstein
- (Israel) Doron Sheffer
- (Israel) Yoav Saffar
- (United States) (Israel) David Bluthenthal
- (Slovenia) Beno Udrih
- (Turkey) Hüseyin Beşok
- (Israel) Erez Kohansky
- (Israel) Yotam Halperin
- Coach: (United States) (Israel) David Blatt
- Assistant Coach: (United States) Charles Barton
- Team Manager: (Israel) Moni Fanan

Source: 2003 Roster, Maccabi Tel Aviv website

== 2003/04 ==
Titles

- (European Union) Euroleague Champion
- (Israel) Israeli League Champion
- (Israel) Israeli State Cup Champion

Roster

- (Israel) Avi Ben-Chimol
- (United States) Maceo Baston
- (United States) (Israel) Derrick Sharp
- (Croatia) Nikola Vujčić
- (Croatia) Bruno Šundov
- (United States) Anthony Parker
- (Israel) Gur Shelef (C)
- (Israel) Tal Burstein
- (Israel) Yotam Halperin
- (Israel) Yoav Saffar
- (Lithuania) Šarūnas Jasikevičius
- (United States) (Israel) Deon Thomas
- (United States) (Israel) David Bluthenthal
- (Israel) Anton Kazarnovski
- Coach: (Israel) Pini Gershon
- Assistant Coach: (United States) (Israel) David Blatt
- Team Manager: (Israel) Moni Fanan

Source: 2004 Roster, Maccabi Tel Aviv website

== 2004/05 ==
Titles

- (European Union) Euroleague Champion
- (Israel) Israeli League Champion
- (Israel) Israeli State Cup Champion

Roster

- (Israel) Assaf Dotan
- (Israel) Regev Fanan
- (United States) Maceo Baston
- (United States) (Israel) Derrick Sharp
- (Croatia) Nikola Vujčić
- (United States) Anthony Parker
- (Israel) Gur Shelef (C)
- (Israel) Tal Burstein
- (Israel) Yotam Halperin
- (Lithuania) Šarūnas Jasikevičius
- (Greece) Nestoras Kommatos
- (United States) (Israel) Deon Thomas
- (Israel) (Poland) Yaniv Green
- Coach: (Israel) Pini Gershon
- Assistant coach: (Israel) Jacob Gino
- Assistant coach: (Israel) Dan Shamir
- Team Manager: (Israel) Moni Fanan

Source: 2005 Roster, Maccabi Tel Aviv website

== 2005/06 ==
Titles

- (Israel) Israeli League Israeli Champion
- (Israel) Israeli State Cup Champion

Honors

- (European Union) Euroleague Runner-Up

Roster

- (United States) Maceo Baston
- (United States) (Israel) Derrick Sharp (C)
- (Croatia) Nikola Vujčić
- (United States) Anthony Parker
- (Israel) Tal Burstein
- (Israel) Sharon Shason
- (Israel) Assaf Dotan
- (Israel) Omri Casspi
- (United States) Will Solomon
- (New Zealand) Kirk Penney
- (United States) (Israel) Jamie Arnold
- (Israel) (Poland) Yaniv Green
- Coach: (Israel) Pini Gershon
- Assistant coach: (Israel) Dan Shamir
- Assistant coach: (Israel) Avi Kowalsky
- Team Manager: (Israel) Moni Fanan

Source: 2006 Roster, Maccabi Tel Aviv website

== 2006/07 ==
Titles

- (Israel) Israeli League Champion

Honors

- (European Union) Euroleague Quarter Finalist
- (Israel) Israeli State Cup Semi-Finalist

Roster

- (United States) (Israel) Derrick Sharp (C)
- (Croatia) Nikola Vujčić
- (Israel) Tal Burstein
- (Israel) Sharon Shason
- (United States) (Israel) Jamie Arnold
- (Israel) Yaniv Green
- (United States) Will Bynum
- (United States) Noel Felix
- (Israel) Lior Eliyahu
- (Israel) Regev Fanan
- (Lithuania) Simas Jasaitis
- (Montenegro) Goran Jeretin
- (Israel) Yotam Halperin
- (United States) Rodney Buford
- Coach: (Croatia) Neven Spahija
- Assistant coach: (Israel) Guy Goodes
- Assistant coach: (Israel) Danny Gutt
- Team Manager: (Israel) Moni Fanan

Source: 2007 Roster, Maccabi Tel Aviv website

== 2007/08 ==
Titles

- (Israel) Israeli League Cup Champion

Honors

- (European Union) Euroleague Runner-Up
- (Israel) Israeli League Finalist
- Israel State Cup Finalist

Roster

- (United States) Will Bynum
- (United States) Marcus Fizer
- (United States) (Israel) Derrick Sharp (C)
- (Croatia) Nikola Vujčić
- (Israel) Lior Eliyahu
- (United States) Terence Morris
- (Israel) Tal Burstein
- (Israel) Omri Casspi
- (Brazil) Alex Garcia
- (United States) (Israel) David Bluthenthal
- (United States) Vonteego Cummings
- (Uruguay) Esteban Batista
- (Israel) Yotam Halperin
- (Israel) Regev Fanan
- Coach: (Israel) Oded Kattash (to January 2008)
- Coach: (Israel) Zvi Sherf (from January 2008)
- Assistant coach: (Israel) Guy Goodes
- Team Manager: (Israel) Moni Fanan

Source: 2008 Roster, Maccabi Tel Aviv website

== 2008/09 ==
Titles

- (Israel) Israeli League Champion

Honors

- (European Union) Euroleague Top 16
- (Israel) Israeli League Cup Quarterfinals
- Israel State Cup Second Round

Roster

- (Puerto Rico) Carlos Arroyo
- (United States) Dee Brown
- (United States) Marcus Brown
- (Israel) Tal Burstein
- (Israel) Omri Casspi
- (Israel) Lior Eliyahu
- (United States) D'or Fischer
- (Israel) (Poland) Yaniv Green
- (Israel) Dror Hajaj
- (Israel) Raviv Limonad
- (United States) Aaron McGhee
- (United States) (Israel) Derrick Sharp (C)
- (United States) Chester Simmons
- (Israel) Anton Shoutvin
- Coach: (Israel) Effi Birnbaum (to November 2008)
- Coach: (Israel) Pini Gershon (from November 2008)
- Assistant coach: (Israel) Sharon Drucker
- Assistant coach: (Israel) Avi Even
- Team Manager: (Israel) Gur Shelef

Source: 2009 Roster, Maccabi Tel Aviv website

== 2009/10 ==
Titles

- (Israel) Israeli State Cup Champion

Honors

- (European Union) Euroleague Quarter Finalist
- (Israel) Israeli League Runner-Up
- (Israel) Israeli League Cup Runner-Up

Roster

- (United States) Andrew Wisniewski
- (United States) Doron Perkins
- (United States) Alan Anderson
- (Israel) Guy Pnini
- (Gabon) Stéphane Lasme
- (United States) Chuck Eidson
- (United States) D'or Fischer
- (Israel) (Poland) Yaniv Green
- (United States) (Israel) David Bluthenthal
- (Israel) Raviv Limonad
- (Poland) Maciej Lampe
- (United States) (Israel) Derrick Sharp (C)
- (Israel) (Poland) Gal Mekel
- (Israel) Tomer Bar Even
- Coach: (Israel) Pini Gershon
- Assistant coach: (Israel) Sharon Drucker
- Assistant coach: (Israel) Avi Even
- Team Manager: (Israel) Gur Shelef

Source: 2010 Roster, Maccabi Tel Aviv website

== 2010/11 ==
Titles

- (Israel) Israeli State Cup Champion
- (Israel) Israeli League Champion
- (Israel) Israeli League Cup Champion

Honors

- (European Union) Euroleague Runner-Up

Roster

- (United States) Jeremy Pargo
- (United States) Richard Hendrix
- (United States) (Israel) Derrick Sharp (C)
- (United States) (Israel) David Blu
- (Israel) Lior Eliyahu
- (Israel) (Poland) Yaniv Green
- (Israel) Guy Pnini
- (Israel) Tal Burstein
- (Israel) (United States) Sean Labanowski
- (United States) Chuck Eidson
- (Serbia) Milan Mačvan
- (United States) Doron Perkins
- (Greece) Sofoklis Schortsanitis
- (United States) Jeff Foote
- (Israel) Elishay Kadir
- Coach: (United States) (Israel) David Blatt
- Assistant coach: (Israel) Guy Goodes
- Assistant coach: (Israel) Avi Even
- Team Manager: (Israel) Gur Shelef

Source: 2011 Roster, Maccabi Tel Aviv website

== 2011/12 ==
Titles

- (Israel) Israeli League Champion
- (Israel) Israeli State Cup Champion
- (Israel) Israeli League Cup Champion
- (European Union) Adriatic League Champion

Honors

- (European Union) Euroleague Quarter Finalist

Roster

- (United States) Jordan Farmar
- (United States) Richard Hendrix
- (Israel) Yogev Ohayon
- (United States) (Israel) David Blu
- (Israel) Lior Eliyahu
- (United States) Demond Mallet
- (United States) (Israel) Jon Scheyer
- (Israel) Guy Pnini
- (Israel) Tal Burstein (C)
- (Greece) Theodoros Papaloukas
- (United States) Devin Smith
- (Israel) Idan Zalmanson
- (United States) Keith Langford
- (Greece) Sofoklis Schortsanitis
- (Guyana) (United States) Shawn James
- (Israel) Alon Stein
- (Israel) Arad Harrari
- Coach: (United States) (Israel) David Blatt
- Assistant coach: (Israel) Guy Goodes
- Assistant coach: (United States) (Israel) Derrick Sharp
- Team Manager: (Israel) Gur Shelef

Source: 2012 Roster, Maccabi Tel Aviv website

== 2012/13 ==
Titles

- (Israel) Israeli State Cup Champion
- (Israel) Israeli League Cup Champion

Honors

- (European Union) Euroleague Quarter Finalist
- (Israel) Israeli League Runner-Up

Roster

- (United States) Ricky Hickman
- (United States) (Azerbaijan) Nik Caner-Medley
- (Israel) Yogev Ohayon
- (Israel) Lior Eliyahu (C)
- (Georgia (country)) Giorgi Shermadini
- (Israel) Guy Pnini
- (Israel) Itay Segev
- (United States) (Israel) Sylven Landesberg
- (United States) Devin Smith
- (Israel) Idan Zalmanson
- (Croatia) Darko Planinić
- (United States) (Poland) David Logan
- (Guyana) (United States) Shawn James
- (Israel) Moran Roth
- (United States) Malcolm Thomas
- Coach: (United States) (Israel) David Blatt
- Assistant coach: (Israel) Guy Goodes
- Assistant coach: (United States) (Israel) Derrick Sharp
- Team Manager: (Israel) Gur Shelef

Source: 2013 Roster, Maccabi Tel Aviv website

== 2013/14 ==
Titles

- (European Union) Euroleague Champion
- (Israel) Israeli League Champion
- (Israel) Israeli State Cup Champion
- (Israel) Israeli League Cup Champion

Roster

- (United States) (Georgia (country)) Ricky Hickman
- (United States) (Montenegro) Tyrese Rice
- (Israel) Yogev Ohayon
- (Guyana) (United States) Shawn James
- (United States) Devin Smith
- (Israel) Guy Pnini (C)
- (Israel) Ben Altit
- (United States) (Israel) Sylven Landesberg
- (United States) (Israel) Alex Tyus
- (Israel) Arad Harrari
- (Greece) (Cameroon) Sofoklis Schortsanitis
- (Australia) Joe Ingles
- (United States) (Israel) David Blu
- (United States) (Israel) Jake Cohen
- (Croatia) Andrija Žižić
- (Israel) Yuval Naimi
- Coach: (United States) (Israel) David Blatt
- Assistant coach: (Israel) Guy Goodes
- Assistant coach: (Israel) Alon Stein
- Team Manager: (Croatia) Nikola Vujčić

Source: 2014 Roster, Maccabi Tel Aviv website

== 2014/15 ==
Titles

- (Israel) Israeli State Cup Champion

Honors

- (European Union) FIBA Intercontinental Cup Runner-Up
- (European Union) Euroleague Quarter Finalist
- (Israel) Israeli League Semi-Finalist
- (Israel) Israeli League Cup Runner-Up

Roster

- (Israel) Yogev Ohayon (C)
- (Israel) Guy Pnini
- (Israel) Ben Altit
- (Israel) Arad Harrari
- (Israel) Orr Leumi
- (United States) (Israel) Sylven Landesberg
- (United States) (Israel) Alex Tyus
- (United States) (Israel) Jake Cohen
- (United States) Devin Smith
- (Greece) (Cameroon) Sofoklis Schortsanitis
- (United States) (Georgia (country)) Marquez Haynes
- (United States) Jeremy Pargo
- (United States) Brian Randle
- (United States) (Israel) Joe Alexander
- (United States) Nate Linhart
- (Australia) (Serbia) Aleks Marić
- (United States) Joseph Forte
- Coach: (Israel) Guy Goodes
- Assistant coach: (Israel) Pini Gershon
- Assistant coach: (Israel) Alon Stein
- Team Manager: (Croatia) Nikola Vujčić

Source: 2015 Roster, Maccabi Tel Aviv website

== 2015/16 ==
Titles

- (Israel) Israeli State Cup Champion
- (Israel) Israeli League Cup Champion

Honors

- (Israel) Israeli League Semi-Finalist
- (European Union) Euroleague First Round
- (European Union) Eurocup Last 32

Roster

- (Israel) (Poland) Gal Mekel
- (Israel) Yogev Ohayon
- (Israel) Guy Pnini (C)
- (Israel) Dagan Yivzori
- (Israel) Itay Segev
- (Israel) Yovel Zoosman
- (Israel) Idan Paz
- (United States) (Israel) Jordan Farmar
- (United States) (Israel) Sylven Landesberg
- (United States) (Montenegro) (Israel) Taylor Rochestie
- (United States) Devin Smith
- (United States) Brian Randle
- (United States) (Nigeria) Trevor Mbakwe
- (United States) Arinze Onuaku
- (United States) (Nigeria) Ike Ofoegbu
- (Brazil) (Spain) Vítor Faverani
- (Croatia) (Bosnia and Herzegovina) Dragan Bender
- (United States) (North Macedonia) Richard Hendrix
- (United States) Elijah Millsap
- (United States) (Bulgaria) Cedric Simmons
- Coach: (Israel) Guy Goodes (to November 2015)
- Coach: (Croatia) Žan Tabak (from November 2015)
- Assistant coach: (Israel) Avi Even
- Assistant coach: (Israel) Rafi Bogatin
- Team Manager: (Croatia) Nikola Vujčić

Source: 2016 Roster, Maccabi Tel Aviv website

== 2016/17 ==
Titles

- (Israel) Israeli State Cup Champion

Honors

- (Israel) Israeli League Semi-Finalist
- (Israel) Israeli League Cup Runner-Up
- (European Union) Euroleague Regular Season

Roster

- (Israel) (Poland) Gal Mekel
- (Israel) Yogev Ohayon
- (Israel) Guy Pnini (C)
- (Israel) Dagan Yivzori
- (Israel) Itay Segev
- (United States) (Israel) Sylven Landesberg
- (United States) (Israel) Joe Alexander
- (United States) Devin Smith
- (Germany) Maik Zirbes
- (United States) Quincy Miller
- (United States) Sonny Weems
- (United States) D. J. Seeley
- (United States) Andrew Goudelock
- (United States) Victor Rudd
- (United States) Colton Iverson
- (United States) Diamon Simpson
- Coach: (Israel) Erez Edelstein (to October 2016)
- Coach: (Israel) Rami Hadar (from October 2016 to December 2016)
- Coach: (Latvia) Ainars Bagatskis (from December 2016 to May 2017)
- Coach: (Israel) Arik Shivek (to June 2017)
- Assistant coach: (Israel) Rami Hadar (to October 2016)
- Assistant coach: (Israel) Lior Lubin
- Assistant coach: (United States) Tim Fanning (from November 2016)
- Team Manager: (Croatia) Nikola Vujčić

Source: 2017 Roster, Maccabi Tel Aviv website

== 2017/18 ==
Titles

- (Israel) Israeli League Champion
- (Israel) Israeli League Cup Champion

Honors

- (Israel) Israeli State Cup Runner-Up
- (European Union) Euroleague Regular Season

Roster

- (Israel) Yovel Zoosman
- (Israel) Itay Segev (C)
- (Israel) Karam Mashour
- (Israel) (Serbia) Deni Avdija
- (United States) (Israel) John DiBartolomeo
- (United States) (Israel) Alex Tyus
- (United States) (Israel) Jake Cohen
- (United States) (Tunisia) Michael Roll
- (United States) Pierre Jackson
- (United States) Deshaun Thomas
- (Australia) Jonah Bolden
- (United States) (Hungary) DeAndre Kane
- (United States) Norris Cole
- (Belarus) Artsiom Parakhouski
- (United States) Jeremy Pargo
- Coach: (Croatia) Neven Spahija
- Assistant Coach: (Israel) Guy Goodes
- Assistant Coach: (Israel) Tal Burstein
- Assistant Coach: (United States) Tim Fanning
- Team Manager: (Croatia) Nikola Vujčić

Source: 2018 Roster, Maccabi Tel Aviv website

== 2018/19 ==
Titles

- (Israel) Israeli League Champion

Honors

- (European Union) Euroleague Regular Season
- (Israel) Israeli State Cup Quarterfinals
- (Israel) Israeli League Cup Quarterfinals

Roster

- (Israel) Yovel Zoosman
- (Israel) Nimrod Levi
- (Israel) (Serbia) Deni Avdija
- (Israel) Dori Sahar
- (United States) (Israel) John DiBartolomeo (C)
- (United States) (Israel) Alex Tyus
- (United States) (Israel) Jake Cohen
- (United States) (Hungary) DeAndre Kane
- (United States) (Tunisia) Michael Roll
- (United States) Jeremy Pargo
- (United States) Kendrick Ray
- (United States) Tarik Black
- (United States) Ramon Sessions
- (United States) Johnny O'Bryant III
- (United States) (Italy) Angelo Caloiaro
- (United States) (Turkey) Scottie Wilbekin
- Coach: (Croatia) Neven Spahija (to November 2018)
- Coach: (Greece) Ioannis Sfairopoulos (from November 2018)
- Assistant Coach: (Israel) Guy Goodes (to November 2018)
- Assistant Coach: (Greece) Vassilis Geragotellis (from November 2018)
- Assistant Coach: (United States) Tim Fanning
- Assistant Coach: (Serbia) Veljko Perović
- Team Manager: (Croatia) Nikola Vujčić

Source: 2019 Roster, Maccabi Tel Aviv website

== 2019/20 ==
Titles

- (Israel) Israeli League Champion

Honors

- (European Union) Euroleague Regular Season 5 seed before season cancellation.
- Israel State Cup Quarterfinals
- (Israel) Israeli League Cup Runner-Up

Roster

- (Israel) Yovel Zoosman
- (Israel) Deni Avdija
- (Israel) Omri Casspi
- (Israel) Dori Sahar
- (Israel) Yonathan Atias
- (Israel) Amit Aharoni
- (United States) (Israel) John DiBartolomeo (C)
- (United States) (Israel) Jake Cohen
- (United States) (Israel) Amar'e Stoudemire
- (United States) (Israel) Sandy Cohen
- (France) (Israel) Frédéric Bourdillon
- (United States) Tarik Black
- (United States) Scottie Wilbekin
- (United States) (Italy) Angelo Caloiaro
- (United States) Nate Wolters
- (United States) Othello Hunter
- (United States) Elijah Bryant
- (United States) Quincy Acy
- (United States) (Greece) Tyler Dorsey
- (United States) Aaron Jackson
- (United States) Jalen Reynolds
- Coach: (Greece) Ioannis Sfairopoulos
- Assistant Coach: (Greece) Vassilis Geragotellis
- Assistant Coach: (United States) Tim Fanning
- Assistant Coach: (Serbia) Veljko Perović
- Team Manager: (Croatia) Nikola Vujčić

Source: 2020 Roster, Maccabi Tel Aviv website

== 2020/21 ==
Titles

- (Israel) Israeli League Champion
- (Israel) Israeli State Cup Champion
- (Israel) Israeli League Cup Champion

Honors

- (European Union) Euroleague Regular Season

Roster

- (Israel) Yovel Zoosman
- (Israel) Omri Casspi
- (Israel) Oz Blayzer
- (Israel) Eidan Alber
- (Israel) Dori Sahar
- (Israel) Yonathan Atias
- (United States) (Israel) John DiBartolomeo (C)
- (United States) (Israel) Sandy Cohen
- (United States) (Israel) T. J. Cline
- (United States) Scottie Wilbekin
- (United States) Othello Hunter
- (United States) Angelo Caloiaro
- (United States) Elijah Bryant
- (United States) (Greece) Tyler Dorsey
- (United States) Chris Jones
- (Croatia) Ante Žižić
- (Croatia) Dragan Bender
- Coach: (Greece) Ioannis Sfairopoulos
- Assistant Coach: (Greece) Vassilis Geragotellis
- Assistant Coach: (United States) Tim Fanning
- Assistant Coach: (Israel) Noam Levi
- Team Manager: (Croatia) Nikola Vujčić

Source: 2021 Roster, Maccabi Tel Aviv website

== 2021/22 ==
Titles

- (Israel) Israeli League Cup Champion

Honors

- (Israel) Israeli League Semi-Finalist
- (Israel) Israeli State Cup Semi-Finalist
- (European Union) Euroleague Quarter Finalist

Roster

- (Israel) Oz Blayzer
- (Israel) Yiftach Ziv
- (Israel) Roman Sorkin
- (Israel) Oded Brandwein
- (Israel) Ido Menchel
- (Israel) Nadav Yankowitz
- (United States) (Israel) John DiBartolomeo (C)
- (United States) (Israel) Jake Cohen
- (United States) Scottie Wilbekin
- (United States) Angelo Caloiaro
- (Croatia) Ante Žižić
- (United States) Jalen Reynolds
- (United States) James Nunnally
- (United States) Derrick Williams
- (United States) Kameron Taylor
- (United States) Keenan Evans
- (France) Mathias Lessort
- (United States) Khyri Thomas
- Coach: (Israel) Avi Even (from February 2022)
- Coach: (Greece) Ioannis Sfairopoulos (to February 2022)
- Assistant Coach: (Greece) Vassilis Geragotellis (to February 2022)
- Assistant Coach: (United States) Doron Perkins
- Assistant Coach: (Israel) Noam Levi
- Athletic trainer: (Israel) Regev Fanan
- Sport Director: (Croatia) Nikola Vujčić

Source: 2022 Roster, Maccabi Tel Aviv website

== 2022/23 ==
Titles

- (Israel) Israeli League Champion
- (Israel) Israeli League Cup Champion

Honors

- (Israel) Israeli State Cup Runner-Up
- (European Union) Euroleague Quarter Finalist

Roster

- (Israel) Yiftach Ziv
- (Israel) Roman Sorkin
- (Israel) Guy Pnini
- (Israel) Rafi Menco
- (Israel) Tomer Agmon
- (United States) (Israel) John DiBartolomeo (C)
- (United States) (Israel) Jake Cohen
- (United States) Alex Poythress
- (United States) Bonzie Colson
- (United States) Darrun Hilliard
- (United States) Austin Hollins
- (United States) (Spain) Lorenzo Brown
- (United States) Wade Baldwin
- (United States) Josh Nebo
- (United States) Jarell Martin
- (United States) Jalen Adams
- (United States) Suleiman Braimoh
- Coach: (Israel) Oded Kattash
- Assistant Coach: (Spain) Josep Maria Berrocal
- Assistant Coach: (United States) Doron Perkins
- Assistant Coach: (Israel) Noam Levi
- Athletic Trainer: (Israel) Regev Fanan
- Sport Director: (Croatia) Nikola Vujčić
- Professional Consultant: (United States) (Israel) David Blatt

Source: 2023 Roster, Maccabi Tel Aviv website

== 2023/24 ==
Titles

- (Israel) Israeli League Champion

Honors

- (Israel) Israeli State Cup Runner-Up
- (Israel) Israeli League Cup Runner-Up
- (European Union) Euroleague Quarter Finalist

Roster

- (Israel) Tamir Blatt
- (Israel) Roman Sorkin
- (Israel) Rafi Menco
- (Israel) Omer Mayer
- (United States) (Israel) John DiBartolomeo (C)
- (United States) (Israel) Jake Cohen
- (United States) Bonzie Colson
- (United States) (Spain) Lorenzo Brown
- (United States) Wade Baldwin
- (United States) Josh Nebo
- (United States) James Webb
- (United States) Antonius Cleveland
- (Cuba) Jasiel Rivero
- (United States) Joe Thomasson
- Coach: (Israel) Oded Kattash
- Assistant Coach: (Spain) Josep Maria Berrocal
- Assistant Coach: (Israel) Noam levi
- Assistant Coach: (Israel) Guy Pnini
- Athletic Trainer: (Israel) Regev Fanan
- Sport Director: (Israel) Avi Even
- Professional Consultant: (United States) (Israel) David Blatt

Source: 2024 Roster, Maccabi Tel Aviv website

== 2024/25 ==
Titles

- (Israel) Israeli State Cup Champion
- (Israel) Israeli League Cup Champion

Honors

- (Israel) Israeli League Finalist before season cancellation
- (European Union) Euroleague Regular season

Roster

- (Israel) Roman Sorkin
- (Israel) Tamir Blatt
- (Israel) Rafi Menco
- (Israel) Omer Mayer
- (United States) (Israel) John DiBartolomeo (C)
- (United States) (Israel) Jake Cohen
- (United States) (Israel) Will Rayman
- (United States) (Israel) Alex Tyus
- (Cuba) Jasiel Rivero
- (France) (United States) Jaylen Hoard
- (United States) Levi Randolph
- (South Sudan) (United States) Wenyen Gabriel
- (United States) Jordan Loyd
- (Lithuania) Rokas Jokubaitis
- (United States) Saben Lee
- (France) (Guinea) Alpha Kaba
- (United States) David DeJulius
- (South Sudan) (Canada) Marial Shayok
- (United States) Trevion Williams
- (United States) Jimmy Clark III
- Coach: (Israel) Oded Kattash
- Assistant Coach: (Israel) Noam levi
- Assistant Coach: (Israel) Guy Pnini
- Athletic Trainer: (Israel) Regev Fanan
- Sport Director: (United States) (Israel) David Blatt

Source: 2025 Roster, Maccabi Tel Aviv website

== 2025/26 ==
Titles

- (Israel) Israeli League Champion
- (Israel) Israeli State Cup Champion

Honors

- (European Union) Euroleague Regular season
- (Israel) Super Cup Runner-Up
- (Israel) League Cup Semi-Finalist

Roster

- (Israel) Roman Sorkin
- (Israel) Tamir Blatt
- (Israel) Gur Lavy
- (Israel) Amit Ebo
- (Israel) Oren Sahar
- (Israel) Tamir Gold
- (United States) (Israel) John DiBartolomeo (C)
- (United States) (Israel) Will Rayman
- (United States) (Israel) T. J. Leaf
- (France) (United States) Jaylen Hoard
- (United States) Jimmy Clark III
- (Canada) Oshae Brissett
- (Brazil) Márcio Santos
- (United States) Lonnie Walker
- (United States) Jeff Dowtin
- (Serbia) Uroš Trifunović
- (Nigeria) Clifford Omoruyi
- (Denmark) Gabriel Lundberg
- (United States) Zach Hankins
- Coach: (Israel) Oded Kattash
- Assistant Coach: (Israel) Noam levi
- Assistant Coach: (Israel) Guy Pnini
- Athletic Trainer: (Israel) Regev Fanan
- Sport Director: (Italy) Claudio Coldebella

Source: 2026 Roster, Maccabi Tel Aviv website

== 2026/27 ==
Titles

- (Israel) Super Cup Champion
- (Israel) League Cup Champion

Honors

Roster

- (Israel) Roman Sorkin
- (Israel) Yam Madar
- (Israel) Gur Lavy
- (Israel) Amit Ebo
- (United States) (Israel) John DiBartolomeo (C)
- (United States) (Israel) Will Rayman
- (United States) (Israel) T. J. Leaf
- (United States) (Israel) Shane Hunter
- (France) (United States) Jaylen Hoard
- (United States) Jimmy Clark III
- (Canada) Oshae Brissett
- (Denmark) Gabriel Lundberg
- (United States) Bonzie Colson
- (Germany) Daniel Theis
- (United States) Armando Bacot
- (United States) Keaton Wallace
- (United States) Kamar Baldwin
- Coach: (Israel) Oded Kattash
- Assistant Coach: (Israel) Noam levi
- Assistant Coach: (Israel) Guy Pnini
- Athletic Trainer: (Israel) Regev Fanan
- Sport Director: (Italy) Claudio Coldebella

Source: 2027 Roster, Maccabi Tel Aviv website
