= 2005 Euroleague Final Four =

Basketball tournament

- Season: 2004–05 Euroleague

Tournament details
- Arena: Olimpiisky; Moscow, Russia
- Dates: May 6 – May 8, 2005

Final positions
- Champions: (Israel) Maccabi Tel Aviv (5th title)
- Runners-up: (Spain) TAU Cerámica
- Third place: (Greece) Panathinaikos
- Fourth place: (Russia) CSKA Moscow

Awards and statistics
- MVP: (Lithuania) Šarūnas Jasikevičius

The 2005 Euroleague Final Four was the concluding Euroleague Final Four tournament of the 2004–05 Euroleague season. The tournament was held on May 6 and on May 8, 2005. The event was held at Olimpiisky Arena in Moscow, Russia.

== Bracket ==
Semifinals; 6 May
(Israel) Maccabi Elite	91
(Greece) Panathinaikos	82
(Russia) CSKA Moscow	78
(Spain) Tau Cerámica	85

Final; 8 May
(Israel) Maccabi Elite	90
(Spain) Tau Cerámica	78
Third place
(Russia) CSKA Moscow	91
(Greece) Panathinaikos	94

== Semifinals ==
6 May 2005
19:10

Report

Maccabi Elite (Israel)	91–82	(Greece) Panathinaikos
Scoring by quarter: 25–18, 24–23, 19–21, 23–20
Pts: Sharp 20; Rebs: three players 5 Asts: Jasikevičius 8		Pts: Kutluay 17; Rebs: Batiste 6 Asts: Diamantidis 5

Olimpiisky Arena, Moscow
Attendance: 13,607
Referees: Jungebrand (FIN), Facchini (ITA), Arteaga (ESP)

6 May 2005
21:40

Report

CSKA Moscow (Russia)	78–85	(Spain) Tau Cerámica
Scoring by quarter: 17–25, 23–22, 19–13, 19–25
Pts: Holden 20; Rebs: Andersen 7 Asts: Brown 5		Pts: Macijauskas 23; Rebs: Dávid 12; Asts: Prigioni 5

Olimpiisky Arena, Moscow
Attendance: 13,607
Referees: Tsanidis (GRE), Brazauskas (LTU), Ankarali (TUR)

== Third place game ==
8 May 2005
15:10

Report

CSKA Moscow (Russia)	91–94	(Greece) Panathinaikos
Pts: Brown 21; Rebs: Andersen 15; Asts: Holden, Papaloukas 4		Pts: Batiste 28; Rebs: Batiste 10; Asts: Diamantidis, Lakovič 4

Olimpiisky Arena, Moscow
Attendance: 13,607
Referees: Facchini (ITA), Sudek (SVK), Arteaga (ESP), Dagan (ISR)

== Final ==
8 May 2005
18:40

Report

Maccabi Elite (Israel)	90–78	(Spain) Tau Cerámica
Scoring by quarter: 26–15, 24–24, 15–23, 25–16
Pts: Jasikevičius 22; Rebs: Baston 7 Asts: Vujčić 7		Pts: Scola 21; Rebs: Scola 9 Asts: Scola 4

Olimpiisky Arena, Moscow
Attendance: 13,607
Referees: Brazauskas (LTU), Cazzaro (ITA), Jungebrand (FIN), Zych (POL)

Maccabi Elite	Tau Cerámica

Starters:			P	R	A
PG	13	(Lithuania) Šarūnas Jasikevičius	22	6	5
SG	8	(United States) Anthony Parker	12	3	6
SF	10	(Israel) Tal Burstein	8	2	2
PF	5	(United States) Maceo Baston	18	7	0
C	7	(Croatia) Nikola Vujčić	13	4	7
Reserves:			P	R	A
PG	4	(Israel) Regev Fanan	DNP		
PG	6	(Israel) Derrick Sharp	0	0	0
PF	9	(Israel) Gur Shelef (C)	0	0	0
SF	11	(Israel) Yotam Halperin	2	0	1
SG	14	(Israel) Dotan Assaf	2	0	0
SF	20	(Greece) Nestoras Kommatos	13	3	0
C	41	(Israel) Yaniv Green	0	0	0
Head coach:
(Israel) Pini Gershon

2004–05 Euroleague
Champions

Maccabi Elite
5th Title

Starters:			P	R	A
PG	8	(Spain) José Calderón	16	4	0
SG	7	(Lithuania) Arvydas Macijauskas	13	2	1
SF	6	(United States) Travis Hansen	13	3	1
PF	4	(Argentina) Luis Scola (C)	21	9	4
C	18	(Hungary) Kornél Dávid	4	2	0
Reserves:			P	R	A
PG	5	(Argentina) Pablo Prigioni	0	0	1
SF	9	(Spain) Sergi Vidal	5	2	1
PF	13	(United States) Robert Conley	DNP		
C	21	(Brazil) Tiago Splitter	6	4	0
SF	22	(Argentina) Roberto Gabini	0	0	0
C	51	(United Kingdom) Andy Betts	0	0	0
Head coach:
(Serbia and Montenegro) Duško Ivanović

== Awards ==
=== Euroleague Final Four MVP ===
- (Lithuania) Šarūnas Jasikevičius ( (Israel) Maccabi Tel Aviv)

=== Euroleague Finals Top Scorer ===
- (Lithuania) Šarūnas Jasikevičius ( (Israel) Maccabi Tel Aviv)
