= 2004 Euroleague Final Four =

Basketball tournament

Tournament details
- Arena: Yad Eliyahu Arena; Tel Aviv, Israel
- Dates: April 29 – May 1, 2004

Final positions
- Champions: (Israel) Maccabi Tel Aviv (4th title)
- Runners-up: (Italy) Skipper Bologna
- Third place: (Russia) CSKA Moscow
- Fourth place: (Italy) Montepaschi Siena

Awards and statistics
- MVP: (United States) Anthony Parker

The 2004 Euroleague Final Four was the concluding Euroleague Final Four tournament of the 2003–04 Euroleague season.

== Bracket ==
Semi-finals
April 29, Tel Aviv
(Italy) Montepaschi Siena	102
(Italy) Skipper Bologna	103
April 29, Tel Aviv
(Israel) Maccabi Elite	93
(Russia) CSKA Moscow	82

Final
May 1, Tel Aviv
(Israel) Maccabi Elite	118
(Italy) Skipper Bologna	74
Third place
May 1, Tel Aviv
(Italy) Montepaschi Siena	94
(Russia) CSKA Moscow	97

== Semifinals ==
29 April 2004
18:10

Report

Montepsachi Siena (Italy)	102–103 (OT)	(Italy) Skipper Bologna
Scoring by quarter: 20–23, 18–24, 24–17, 28–26, Overtime: 12–13
Pts: Thornton 26; Rebs: Thornton 10; Asts: V. Stefanov 9		Pts: Delfino 27; Rebs: Delfino 5 Asts: Basile 8

Nokia Arena, Tel Aviv
Attendance: 10,000
Referees: Belosevic (SCG), Brazauskas (LTU), Koukoulekidis (GRE), Dordevic (SLO)

29 April 2004
20:40

Report

Maccabi Elite (Israel)	93–85	(Russia) CSKA Moscow
Scoring by quarter: 18–27, 23–15, 21–13, 31–30
Pts: Parker 27; Rebs: Baston 10; Asts: Jasikevičius 6		Pts: Brown 23; Rebs: Türkcan 10; Asts: Brown 6

Nokia Arena, Tel Aviv
Attendance: 10,000
Referees: Pitsilkas (GRE), Sudek (SLO), Mitjana (ESP)

== Third place ==
1 May 2004
18:10

Report

Montepaschi Siena (Italy)	94–97	(Russia) CSKA Moscow
Scoring by quarter: 32–15, 24–25, 17–31, 21–26
Pts: Vanterpool 18; Rebs: Andersen, Galanda 5 Asts: Thornton 5		Pts: Brown 27; Rebs: Khryapa 7 Asts: Brown 5

Nokia Arena, Tel Aviv
Attendance: 10,000
Referees: Ramos (ESP), Pitsilkas (GRE), Dozai (CRO), Dordevic (SLO)

== Final ==
1 May 2004
20:40

Report

Maccabi Elite (Israel)	118–74	(Italy) Skipper Bologna
Scoring by quarter: 31–13, 24–17, 25–21, 38–23
Pts: Parker 21; Rebs: Burstein 10; Asts: Shelef 7		Pts: Vujanić 21; Rebs: Delfino 4 Asts: Pozzecco 3

Nokia Arena, Tel Aviv
Attendance: 10,000
Referees: Brazauskas (LTU), Koukoulekidis (GRE), Belosevic (SCG)

Maccabi Elite	Skipper Bologna

Starters:			P	R	A
PG	13	(Lithuania) Šarūnas Jasikevičius	18	2	5
SG	8	(United States) Anthony Parker	21	4	3
SF	10	(Israel) Tal Burstein	17	10	6
PF	5	(United States) Maceo Baston	9	6	1
C	7	(Croatia) Nikola Vujčić	9	1	0
Reserves:			P	R	A
SG	4	(Israel) Avi Ben-Chimol	2	0	1
PG	6	(Israel) Derrick Sharp	9	1	3
PF	9	(Israel) Gur Shelef (C)	2	4	7
SF	11	(Israel) Yotam Halperin	7	2	4
C	14	(Croatia) Bruno Šundov	4	0	0
PF	15	(Israel) Deon Thomas	0	0	0
SF	33	(Israel) David Blu	20	3	1
Head coach:
(Israel) Pini Gershon

2003–04 Euroleague
Champions

Maccabi Elite
4th Title

Starters:			P	R	A
PG	13	(Serbia and Montenegro) Miloš Vujanić	21	3	1
SG	5	(Italy) Gianluca Basile (C)	10	2	0
SF	20	(Argentina) Carlos Delfino	6	4	1
PF	8	(Slovenia) Matjaž Smodiš	2	0	1
C	4	(Finland) Hanno Möttölä	7	3	1
Reserves:			P	R	A
PF	6	(Italy) Stefano Mancinelli	3	3	1
SF	7	(Italy) Marco Belinelli	3	0	0
PG	12	(Italy) Gianmarco Pozzecco	10	0	3
C	14	(Belgium) Tomas Van Den Spiegel	3	1	0
SF	15	(Slovenia) Erazem Lorbek	7	2	0
SG	18	(United States) A. J. Guyton	0	1	0
PG	19	(Argentina) Patricio Prato	2	0	0
Head coach:
(Croatia) Jasmin Repeša

== Awards ==
=== Euroleague Final Four MVP ===
- (United States) Anthony Parker ( (Israel) Maccabi Tel Aviv)

=== Euroleague Finals Top Scorer ===
- (United States) Anthony Parker ( (Israel) Maccabi Tel Aviv)
- (Federal Republic of Yugoslavia) Miloš Vujanić ( (Italy) Skipper Bologna)
