= Mens Sana 1871 Basket in international competitions =

Mens Sana 1871 Basket history and statistics in FIBA Europe and Euroleague Basketball (company) competitions.

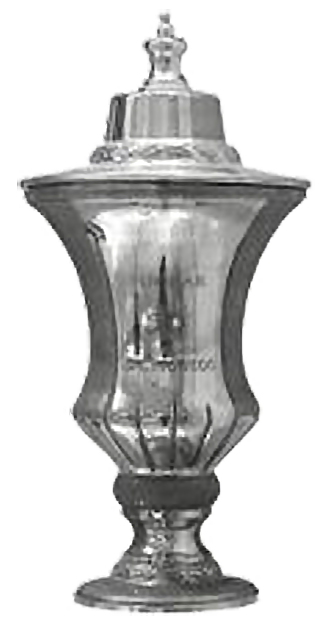

== European competitions ==
| Record | Round | Opponent club | | |
|---|---|---|---|---|
1979–80 FIBA Korać Cup 3rd–tier
| 7–3 | 1st round | (Belgium) Verviers-Pepinster | 78–63 a | 62–56 h |
| 7–3 | 2nd round | (West Germany) Bayreuth | 103–64 a | 84–76 h |
| 7–3 | Top 16 | (France) ASPO Tours | 95–85 h | 92–101 a |
| 7–3 | Top 16 | (Socialist Federal Republic of Yugoslavia) Borac Čačak | 89–99 a | 82–64 h |
| 7–3 | Top 16 | (Israel) Hapoel Tel Aviv | 92–85 h | 83–84 a |
1993–94 FIBA European Cup 2nd–tier
| 3–1 | 2nd round | (Czech Republic) Bioveta COOP Banka Brno | 98–86 a | 91–78 h |
| 3–1 | 3rd round | (Turkey) Tofaş | 79–72 h | 79–87 a |
1997–98 FIBA Korać Cup 3rd–tier
| 5–3 | 1st round | Bye | Fontanafredda Siena qualified without games | |
| 5–3 | 2nd round | (Germany) Tally Oberelchingen | 67–65 a | 89–81 h |
| 5–3 | 2nd round | (Portugal) Aveiro | 88–74 h | 82–77 a |
| 5–3 | 2nd round | (Spain) León Caja España | 73–76 a | 99–104 h |
| 5–3 | 3rd round | (Federal Republic of Yugoslavia) Crvena zvezda | 81–72 h | 73–91 a |
1998–99 FIBA Korać Cup 3rd–tier
| 7–5 | 1st round | Bye | Ducato Siena qualified without games | |
| 7–5 | 2nd round | (Turkey) Tuborg | 70–63 a | 91–56 h |
| 7–5 | 2nd round | (Bosnia and Herzegovina) Borac Nektar Banja Luka | 52–55 a | 77–56 h |
| 7–5 | 2nd round | (Croatia) Benston | 95–63 h | 64–66 a |
| 7–5 | 3rd round | (Portugal) Porto | 63–73 a | 83–56 h |
| 7–5 | Top 16 | (Lithuania) Šiauliai | 85–45 h | 66–69 a |
| 7–5 | QF | (Spain) FC Barcelona | 87–71 h | 59–76 a |
2000–01 FIBA Suproleague 1st–tier
| 6–12 | Regular season | (Israel) Maccabi Ness Ra'anana | 71–86 a | 82–67 h |
| 6–12 | Regular season | (France) ASVEL | 67–70 h | 87–86 a |
| 6–12 | Regular season | (Russia) CSKA Moscow | 78–85 a | 76–78 h |
| 6–12 | Regular season | (Greece) Panathinaikos | 65–97 h | 95–99 a |
| 6–12 | Regular season | (Poland) Śląsk Wrocław | 74–83 h | 72–82 a |
| 6–12 | Regular season | (Croatia) Split CO | 61–81 a | 76–81 h |
| 6–12 | Regular season | (Lithuania) Lietuvos rytas | 87–91 h | 93–92 a |
| 6–12 | Regular season | (Turkey) Ülker | 73–68 a | 76–87 h |
| 6–12 | Regular season | (Germany) Alba Berlin | 93–83 h | 80–79 a |
2001–02 FIBA Saporta Cup 2nd–tier
| 12–4 +1 draw | 1st round | (Spain) Adecco Estudiantes | 106–93 h | 64–68 a |
| 12–4 +1 draw | 1st round | (Turkey) Darüşşafaka | 60–58 a | 106–83 h |
| 12–4 +1 draw | 1st round | (Israel) Hapoel Jerusalem | 71–87 a | 99–77 h |
| 12–4 +1 draw | 1st round | (Greece) Panionios | 74–71 h | 86–91 a |
| 12–4 +1 draw | 1st round | (France) Le Mans Sarthe | 94–46 a | 91–86 h |
| 12–4 +1 draw | Top 16 | (France) SIG | 78–78 a | 74–66 h |
| 12–4 +1 draw | QF | (Russia) UNICS | 70–73 a | 68–58 h |
| 12–4 +1 draw | SF | (Israel) Hapoel Jerusalem | 98–69 h | 94–71 a |
| 12–4 +1 draw | F | (Spain) Pamesa Valencia | 87–86; April 30, Palais des Sports de Gerland, Lyon | |
2002–03 Euroleague 1st–tier
| 11–11 | Regular season | (Lithuania) Žalgiris | 81–74 h | 100–74 a |
| 11–11 | Regular season | (Israel) Maccabi Elite Tel Aviv | 81–107 a | 63–73 h |
| 11–11 | Regular season | (Spain) Tau Cerámica | 85–90 a | 77–62 h |
| 11–11 | Regular season | (Greece) Panathinaikos | 77–69 h | 56–64 a |
| 11–11 | Regular season | (Spain) Unicaja | 74–87 a | 73–79 h |
| 11–11 | Regular season | (Slovenia) Union Olimpija | 86–79 h | 92–94 a |
| 11–11 | Regular season | (Serbia and Montenegro) Budućnost | 75–91 a | 112–49 h |
| 11–11 | Top 16 | (Turkey) Ülker | 84–79 h | 92–80 a |
| 11–11 | Top 16 | (Greece) Panathinaikos | 82–76 h | 103–111 a |
| 11–11 | Top 16 | (Italy) Skipper Bologna | 85–70 a | 64–68 h |
| 11–11 | SF | (Italy) Benetton Treviso | 62–65; May 9, Palau Sant Jordi, Final4 Barcelona | |
| 11–11 | 3rd place game | (Russia) CSKA Moscow | 79–78; May 11, Palau Sant Jordi, Final4 Barcelona | |
2003–04 Euroleague 1st–tier
| 12–10 | Regular season | (Russia) CSKA Moscow | 71–84 a | 79–73 h |
| 12–10 | Regular season | (Lithuania) Žalgiris | 64–56 h | 75–73 a |
| 12–10 | Regular season | (Spain) Unicaja | 80–71 h | 63–75 a |
| 12–10 | Regular season | (Slovenia) Krka | 74–86 a | 82–55 h |
| 12–10 | Regular season | (Greece) Panathinaikos | 86–74 h | 76–80 a |
| 12–10 | Regular season | (Italy) Skipper Bologna | 86–95 a | 76–69 h |
| 12–10 | Regular season | (Israel) Maccabi Elite Tel Aviv | 85–89 h | 86–88 a |
| 12–10 | Top 16 | (Spain) FC Barcelona | 68–73 h | 86–85 a |
| 12–10 | Top 16 | (Greece) Panathinaikos | 86–67 h | 86–77 a |
| 12–10 | Top 16 | (Italy) Benetton Treviso | 92–95 a | 80–64 h |
| 12–10 | SF | (Italy) Skipper Bologna | 102–103; April 29, Nokia Arena, Final4 Tel Aviv | |
| 12–10 | 3rd place game | (Russia) CSKA Moscow | 94–97; May 1, Nokia Arena, Final4 Tel Aviv | |
2004–05 Euroleague 1st–tier
| 9–11 | Regular season | (France) Adecco ASVEL | 86–70 h | 78–54 a |
| 9–11 | Regular season | (Israel) Maccabi Elite Tel Aviv | 88–93 a | 86–90 h |
| 9–11 | Regular season | (Greece) AEK | 77–58 h | 71–75 a |
| 9–11 | Regular season | (Slovenia) Union Olimpija | 74–79 a | 74–70 h |
| 9–11 | Regular season | (Spain) Winterthur FC Barcelona | 88–85 h | 70–58 a |
| 9–11 | Regular season | (Lithuania) Žalgiris | 81–90 a | 70–74 h |
| 9–11 | Regular season | (Italy) Scavolini Pesaro | 93–70 h | 69–83 a |
| 9–11 | Top 16 | (Croatia) Cibona VIP | 90–62 h | 73–78 a |
| 9–11 | Top 16 | (Israel) Maccabi Elite Tel Aviv | 84–85 a | 68–81 h |
| 9–11 | Top 16 | (Turkey) Ülker | 84–71 h | 71–85 a |
