= Moshe Weinkrantz =

Israeli basketball coach

Moshe Weinkrantz משה (מויש'לה) ויינקרנץ
Personal information
- Born: May 3, 1954 (age 72)

Moshe Weinkrantz (Hebrew: משה (מויש'לה) ויינקרנץ; born May 3, 1954) is an Israeli basketball coach. He has coached teams in the Israel Basketball Premier League, the Israel men's national basketball team, and the Israel women's national basketball team.

== Biography ==
In the Israel Basketball Premier League Weinkrantz coached Ironi Ramat Gan from 2008 to 2009. He also coached Maccabi Rishon LeZion, with which he was the Israeli Basketball Premier League Coach of the Year in 1990–91.

In the 1980s, Weinkrantz was an assistant coach to Zvi Sherf at Maccabi Tel Aviv. He then moved as head coach to Hapoel Tel Aviv, Hapoel Eilat, Hapoel Holon, and Maccabi Rishon LeZion among others. In 2008 he coached Bnei Hasharon.

In 1987 Weinkrantz coached the Israel men's national basketball team. Between 2002 and 2004 he coached the Israel women's national basketball team.
