= Shuki Schwartz =

American-Israeli basketball player

Yehoshua "Shuki" Schwartz יהושע "שוקי" שוורץ
Personal information
- Born: April 3, 1954 (age 72) Kiryat Motzkin, Israel
- Listed height: 6 ft 5 in (1.96 m)
- Position: Forward

Career highlights
- 1974 Asian Games gold medal

Yehoshua "Shuki" Schwartz (Hebrew: יהושע "שוקי" שוורץ; born April 3, 1954) is an Israeli former basketball player. He played the forward position. Schwartz played in the Israeli Basketball Premier League.

== Biography ==
Schwartz was born in Kiryat Motzkin, Israel. He is 1.95 m tall.

He competed in basketball for Israel at the 1973 World University Student Games in Moscow.

Schwartz then played in the Israeli Basketball Premier League for Hapoel Haifa (1973–75), Maccabi Tel Aviv (1975-81), and Beitar Tel Aviv (1981–83). He was part of the Maccabi Tel Aviv Israeli team that in the 1976–77 FIBA European Champions Cup (EuroLeague) semifinals defeated CSKA Moscow — the Red Army team—in a dramatic upset, on its way to winning its first European Championship. Schwartz recalled four decades later: "The one great thing about our team was teamwork. In every organization it’s a matter of building the right team, and you need to know how to play together. Each player on the team was a winner, but when it comes to playing together, that was our secret. Most of us were friends both on and off of the court and even today we meet and see each other. We are really friends. That was our secret.

He also played for the Israeli national basketball team. Schwartz competed in the 1971 FIBA European Championship for Cadets, the 1974 Asian Games (at which Israel won a gold medal), the 1975 FIBA European Championship for Men, the 1977 FIBA European Championship for Men, and the 1979 FIBA European Championship for Men (at which Israel won a silver medal).

Schwartz later pursued a career in business, and married and had three children. He acquired the home furniture design company Tollman's in 2005, and is its CEO.
