= Derrick Sharp =

American basketball player (born 1971)

Derrick Sharp דריק שארפ
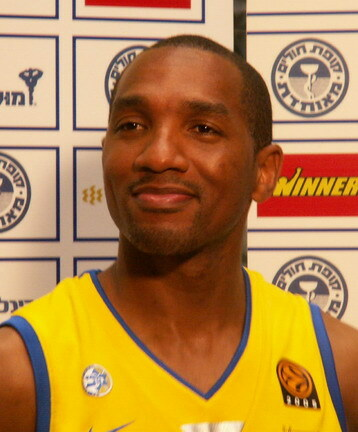
- Sharp with Maccabi Tel Aviv in 2006

Personal information
- Born: October 5, 1971 (age 55) Orlando, Florida, U.S.
- Listed height: 6 ft 1 in (1.85 m)
- Listed weight: 186 lb (84 kg)

Career information
- High school: Maynard Evans (Orlando, Florida)
- College: Brevard CC (1989–1991); South Florida (1991–1993)
- NBA draft: 1993: undrafted
- Playing career: 1993–2011
- Position: Point guard / shooting guard
- Number: 6
- Coaching career: 2011–2013

Career history

Playing
- 1993–1994: Maccabi Hadera
- 1994–1996: Beitar Migdal-HaEmek
- 1996–2011: Maccabi Tel Aviv

Coaching
- 2011–2013: Maccabi Tel Aviv (assistant)

Career highlights
- As player: 2× EuroLeague champion (2004, 2005); FIBA SuproLeague champion (2001); 13× Israeli League champion (1997–2007, 2009, 2011); 11× Israeli State Cup winner (1998–2006, 2010, 2011); 2× Israeli League Cup winner (2007, 2010); Israeli League Rising Star (1997); Maccabi Tel Aviv's 11 Greatest Players (2009); Israeli League 2000–2010 All-Decade Team (2010); As assistant coach: 2× Israeli League champion (2011, 2012); 3× Israeli Cup champion (2011–2013); 3× Israeli League champion (2011–2013); Adriatic League champion (2012)

Derrick Lanorris Sharp (Hebrew: דריק שארפ; born October 5, 1971) is an American-Israeli former professional basketball player. At a height of 1.85 metres (6 feet 1 inch) tall, he played at the point guard and shooting guard positions.

He played with the Maccabi Tel Aviv basketball club for 15 years, spending part of the time as the team's captain, and also later served as the team's assistant coach under David Blatt. With Maccabi, he won a record 29 club titles. In 2009 he was named one of Maccabi Tel Aviv's 11 Greatest Players, and subsequently he was named to the Israeli Basketball Super League 2000–2010 All-Decade Team. In July 2011, Sharp retired from playing professional basketball. After he retired from playing, he remained with Maccabi Tel Aviv, working as an assistant coach with the club, until August 2013.

== High school ==
Sharp was born in Orlando, Florida, and attended Evans High School in Orlando. At Evans High, he played high school basketball at point guard. As a senior during the 1988–89 season, his performances earned him First-Team All-Metro athletic honors.

== College career ==
After high school, Sharp played college basketball at Brevard Community College, from 1989 to 1991. During his time playing for Brevard, he was the top three-point shooter and fourth-leading scorer in Florida. As a sophomore in 1990–91 he averaged 23.8 points per game and was the fourth-leading scorer in Florida. He was tops in Florida with 107 three-pointers and was named the Florida Community College Activities Association (FCCAA) State Junior College Player of the Year.

He then played college basketball at Division 1 University of South Florida, where he played with the South Florida Bulls, from 1991 to 1993. In two seasons he averaged 15.1 points, 3.1 assists, and 1.1 steals per game while shooting 38.6% from three-point range and 82.5% from the free throw line.During his 1991–92 season, Sharp made 88 three-pointers, the second-highest single-season total in South Florida program history.

== Professional playing career ==
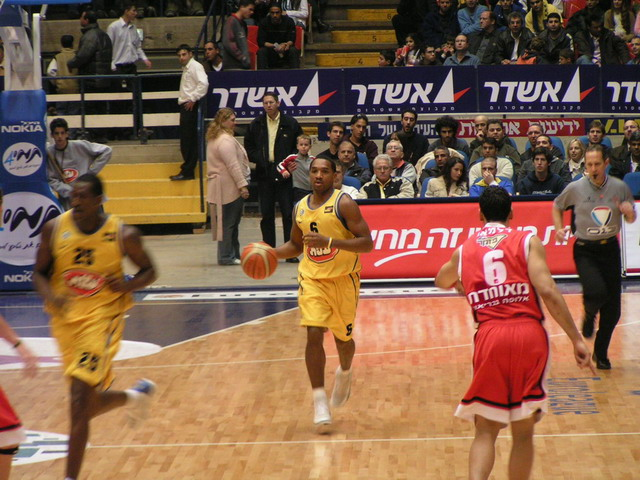
Sharp bringing up the ball, 2003.

He then played his entire professional career in Israel, mostly with Maccabi Tel Aviv (for 15 years, from 1996 to 2011).

Sharp joined Maccabi Hadera, which was playing in the Israeli 2nd Division at the time, for the 1993–94 season. From 1994 to 1996, he played with Hapoel Migdal-HaEmek, which competed in the Israeli 2nd Division in the 1994–95 season, and in the Israeli 3rd Division, in the 1995–96 season. Sharp then made the big jump in his career, when he moved to the most well-known team in Israel – Maccabi Tel Aviv.

With Maccabi Tel Aviv, Sharp playing guard and as team captain won 13 Israeli national league championships, 11 Israeli State Cups, 2 Israeli League Cups, and 3 European-wide titles (the 2001 FIBA SuproLeague, the 2004 EuroLeague, and the 2005 EuroLeague). As a member of Maccabi Tel Aviv, Sharp quickly became a crowd favorite, due to his tough defense, three-point shooting, and clutch plays. The most memorable example of the latter came on April 8, 2004, in a EuroLeague game against the Lithuanian club Zalgiris Kaunas. With 2 seconds remaining in the game, and Maccabi Tel Aviv trailing by 3 points and facing elimination from the EuroLeague Top 16 phase, Sharp caught a long pass from Gur Shelef, turned to the basket, and fired up a game-tying three-pointer, bringing the score to 94-94, forcing overtime. Maccabi Tel Aviv won that game, and advanced to the EuroLeague Final Four, which was held in Tel Aviv that year. The team eventually became the EuroLeague champions.

In July 2011, Sharp retired from playing professional basketball, at the age of 39. In total, Sharp played professional basketball in Israel for 18 years, spending 15 of them with Maccabi Tel Aviv. Sharp finished his playing career ranked seventh all-time on Maccabi Tel Aviv's career scoring list in European-wide games. In the EuroLeague, he scored a total of 1,755 points, in 290 games played, for a career scoring average of 6.1 points per game, when including both the FIBA and EuroLeague Basketball eras of the competition. At the time of his retirement, he was ranked seventh in the EuroLeague's modern era (since 2000), in career free throw accuracy, at 88.9%.

In addition to his team trophies, Sharp was named the Israeli League Rising Star in 1997. In 2009, he was recognized as one of Maccabi Tel Aviv's 11 Greatest Players. The following year, he was voted to the Israeli Premier League 2000–2010 All-Decade Team.

== National team playing career ==
Sharp became a naturalized Israeli citizen. He then played with the senior Israeli national team from 2000 to 2003. With Israel, he played at the 2001 EuroBasket and at the 2003 EuroBasket.

== Coaching career ==
After he retired from playing professional basketball, Sharp continued to work with Maccabi Tel Aviv as an assistant coach, after he had taken a coaching course at Wingate Institute, in 2010. On August 2, 2013, Sharp resigned from his role as an assistant coach of Maccabi Tel-Aviv.

Sharp later moved to Tampa, Florida, where he worked as the head coach of the Blake High School boys' basketball team. Sharp was next the Varsity Boys' Head Basketball Coach at Bishop McLaughlin Catholic High School in Pasco County, Florida. At both high schools he coached his son, Emanuel. As a sophomore in 2019-20, Emanuel was Florida's fourth-leading scorer with 31.9 points per game at Blake High School, and was named Florida Class 5A State Player of the Year. As a junior in 2020-21, he averaged 24.7 points, 3.9 assists, 2.6 rebounds, and 1.8 steals a game for Bishop McLaughlin Catholic High School, and was named Florida Class 3A Player of the Year. He did not compete as a senior in 2021-22, as he was recovering from a severe injury in which he broke his fibula and dislocated his ankle in a pickup game in May 2021.

== Personal life ==
In the mid-1990s, Sharp married an Israeli woman and thus received Israeli citizenship by virtue of that marriage. The couple has one son, who also played basketball in Israel. In 1999, he divorced his first wife and married Canadian basketball player Justine Ellison, who played professional basketball in Israel for a decade. They have four children together, three sons and a daughter.

Sharp lived with his family in Herzliya, Israel, until August 2013, when they moved to Orlando, Florida. His son from his first marriage, Derrick Jr., later returned to Israel where he lives in Haifa and plays pro basketball.

Sharp's son Emanuel Sharp played in college for the Houston Cougars and was then drafted by the Sacramento Kings in the 2026 NBA draft.

== Honors and awards ==
- (Israel) Maccabi Tel Aviv:
  - 13× Israeli League Champion: (1997–2007, 2009, 2011)
  - 11× Israeli State Cup Winner: (1998–2006, 2010, 2011)
  - FIBA SuproLeague Champion: (2001)
  - 3× Triple Crown Winner: (2001, 2004, 2005)
  - 2× EuroLeague Champion: (2004, 2005)
  - 2× Israeli League Cup Winner: (2007, 2010)

== Career statistics ==
Legend
GP	Games played	GS	Games started	MPG	Minutes per game
FG%	Field-goal percentage	3P%	3-point field-goal percentage	FT%	Free-throw percentage
RPG	Rebounds per game	APG	Assists per game	SPG	Steals per game
BPG	Blocks per game	PPG	Points per game	PIR	Performance index rating
**Bold**	Career high

=== EuroLeague ===
*	Led the league

Year	Team	GP	GS	MPG	FG%	3P%	FT%	RPG	APG	SPG	BPG	PPG	PIR
2001–02	Maccabi	20	6	20.4	.443	.382	.952	1.1	.7	.9	—	6.8	4.2
2002–03	Maccabi	20	0	23.2	**.527**	**.515**	.909	1.8	**1.4**	**1.4**	—	7.5	7.4
2003–04	Maccabi	21	0	17.0	.468	.459	.917	.9	.9	.9	—	5.8	3.8
2004–05	Maccabi	24	1	19.6	.495	.431	.821	1.6	1.0	.8	**.1**	7.0	5.3
2005–06	Maccabi	**25**	**10**	23.5	.427	.396	.878	1.8	**1.4**	1.3	—	7.9	6.1
2006–07	Maccabi	23	4	**25.2**	.465	.481	.883	**2.3**	1.3	1.2	.0	**10.4**	**10.2**
2007–08	Maccabi	**25***	0	12.9	.429	.358	**1.000**	.7	.7	.5	—	4.5	3.0
2008–09	Maccabi	14	2	9.4	.300	.313	.500	.5	.1	.3	**.1**	1.3	0.3
2009–10	Maccabi	10	0	1.5	.333	.333	**1.000**	.3	.1	.2	—	0.8	0.6
2010–11	Maccabi	13	0	1.6	.429	.333	.667	.2	—	—	—	0.7	0.3
Career		195	23	17.2	.457	.428	.889	1.2	.9	.8	.0	6.0	4.7
