= Lou Silver =

American basketball player

Personal information
- Born: November 27, 1953 (age 72) New York City, New York, U.S.
- Listed height: 6 ft 8 in (2.03 m)
- Listed weight: 220 lb (100 kg)

Career information
- High school: Sanford H. Calhoun (Merrick, New York)
- College: Harvard (1972–1975)
- NBA draft: 1975: undrafted
- Playing career: 1975–1985
- Position: Small forward / power forward
- Number: 12

Career history
- 1975–1985: Maccabi Tel Aviv

Career highlights
- FIBA Intercontinental Cup champion (1980); 2× EuroLeague champion (1977, 1981); FIBA European Selection (1981); 10× Israeli League champion (1976–1985); 8× Israeli Cup winner (1977–1983, 1985); 2× All-Ivy League (1974, 1975)
Medals
Representing Israel
Men's basketball
EuroBasket
Silver medal – second place	1979 Italy	{{{2}}}

Louis Grant Silver (Hebrew: לו סילבר; born November 27, 1953) is an American-Israeli businessman, attorney, and former professional basketball player. He played in the Israeli Basketball Premier League. Silver received his A.B. from Harvard College in 1975, his LL.B. from Tel Aviv University's School of Law, and his LL.M. from New York University School of Law.

== Early life ==
Silver was raised in Merrick, New York. He attended Sanford H. Calhoun High School.

== Basketball playing career ==
During his basketball playing career, the 2.03 m (6 ft 8 in) tall Silver, played at the small forward and power forward positions. He was considered to be an "all-around" player.

=== College career ===
Silver played college basketball at Harvard College ('75), with the Harvard Crimson. In 1973-74 he averaged 10.1 rebounds and 16.2 points per game, had the fifth-highest scoring average in the Ivy League, and was First Team All Ivy League. Silver served as the team co-captain, during his final year at Harvard College. He also received a number of accolades, while attending, and playing for Harvard College, including being selected to the All-Ivy League Team, and Division honors. He was named 1974-75 All-Ivy second team and National Association of Basketball Coaches All-District second team, after finishing fifth in Ivy League rebounding with a 9.2 average, while averaging 16.1 points per game and shooting .835 from the free throw line.

=== Professional career ===
Silver was selected by the Kentucky Colonels, in the 8th round (81st overall) of the 1975 ABA Draft as that league's final draft choice ever made; one year later, the ABA–NBA merger would be made official.

Silver played in Israel, with Maccabi Tel Aviv (1975–1985), and he served as the captain of the team, from 1981 to 1985. A Jewish-American, he became an Israeli citizen under Israel's Law of Return. While playing with Maccabi Tel Aviv, the team won 10 Israeli League championships (1976, 1977, 1978, 1979, 1980, 1981, 1982, 1983, 1984, 1985) and 8 Israeli State Cups (1977, 1978, 1979, 1980, 1981, 1982, 1983, 1985).

Silver was also a key member of the Maccabi teams that reached 4 FIBA European Champions Cup (EuroLeague) Finals, and that won 2 FIBA European Champions Cup titles (1977 and 1981). With Maccabi, he also won the FIBA Intercontinental Cup, in 1980. Silver was selected to the FIBA European Selection All-Star Team, in 1981. In 1987, FIBA honoured Silver, with a retirement game, featuring Maccabi Tel Aviv, against the then FIBA European Selection Team.

=== Israeli national team career ===
Silver also played for, and helped lead, the senior Israeli National Basketball Team, to a second-place finish at the EuroBasket, as Israel took the silver medal, after losing to the Soviet Union National Team in the finals, at EuroBasket 1979, in Italy.

== Post basketball career ==
Since his retirement from playing professional basketball, Silver has practiced corporate law, at Stroock & Stroock & Lavan, in New York City. He served as general counsel to a publicly listed software company, that is based in Paris, France. His professional career includes profiles as an investment banker, private banker, and hedge fund manager. Silver continues to serve as a member of the board of directors of a number of publicly listed and privately held companies. He is actively involved in corporate governance, audit, and compensation committees.
