= Moti Daniel =

Israeli basketball player

Mordecai "Moti" Daniel מוטי דניאל
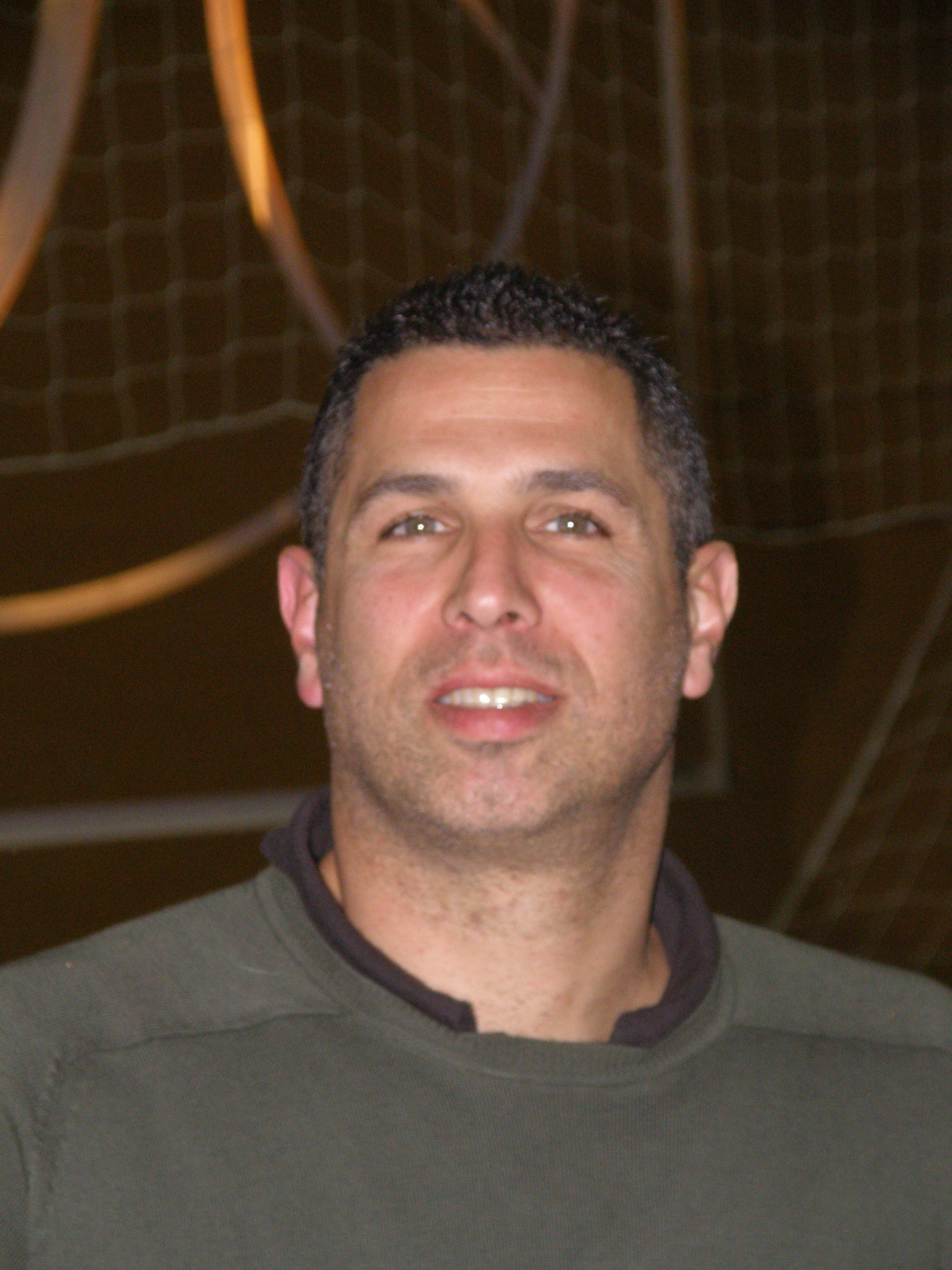

Personal information
- Born: July 24, 1963 (age 63) Holon, Israel
- Listed height: 6 ft 7 in (2.01 m)

Career information
- College: George Washington University
- Position: Forward

Mordecai "Moti" Daniel (Hebrew: מוטי דניאל; also "Motti"; born July 24, 1963) is an Israeli former basketball player. He played the forward position. He played in the Israeli Basketball Premier League, and for the Israeli national basketball team.

== Early and personal life ==
Daniel is from Holon, Israel, and is Jewish. He is 6 ft 7 in (201 cm) tall. He met his wife, Kerry Winter, when she was also a basketball player at George Washington University. They were married in 1988, and moved to Holon.

== Basketball career ==
Daniel attended George Washington University ('87). He played for the George Washington Colonials in 1985–87. In 1985-86 he averaged 9.0 points and 5.0 rebounds per game as a freshman, and was named to the Atlantic 10 Conference All-Freshmen Team. In 1987 his true shooting percentage was .579, fourth in the Atlantic 10 Conference, and he scored 13.1 points per game, 11th in the conference.

He then played in the Israeli Basketball Premier League. Daniel played for Israeli teams Hapoel Holon, Maccabi Tel Aviv, Hapoel Jerusalem, and Maccabi Rishon LeZion.

Daniel also played for the Israeli national basketball team at the 1986 FIBA World Championship for Men.
