= Maceo Baston =

American basketball player (born 1976)

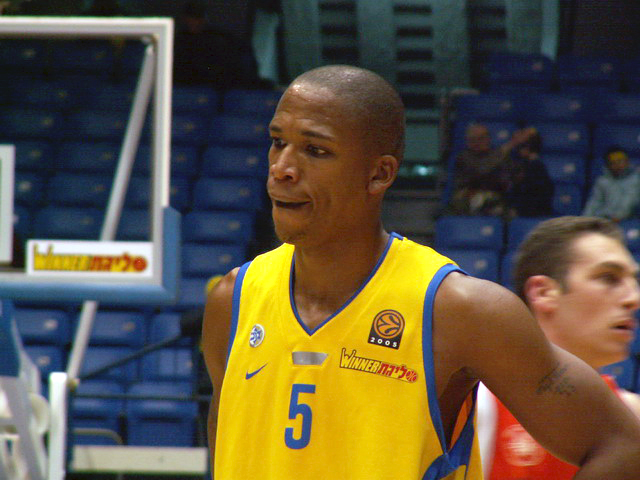
- Baston, with Maccabi Tel Aviv, in 2006.

Personal information
- Born: May 29, 1976 (age 50) Corsicana, Texas, U.S.
- Listed height: 6 ft 10 in (2.08 m)
- Listed weight: 230 lb (104 kg)

Career information
- High school: H. Grady Spruce (Dallas, Texas)
- College: Michigan (1994–1998)
- NBA draft: 1998: 2nd round, 58th overall pick
- Drafted by: Chicago Bulls
- Playing career: 1998–2011
- Position: Power forward

Career history
- 1998–2000: Quad City Thunder
- 2000–2001: SC Montecatini
- 2001–2003: Joventut Badalona
- 2003: Toronto Raptors
- 2003–2006: Maccabi Tel Aviv
- 2006–2007: Indiana Pacers
- 2007–2008: Toronto Raptors
- 2008–2009: Indiana Pacers
- 2010: Budivelnyk Kyiv
- 2010: Obradoiro CAB
- 2010–2011: Bnei HaSharon

Career highlights
- 2× EuroLeague champion (2004, 2005); 3× Israeli League champion (2004–2006); 3× Israeli Cup winner (2004–2006); All-CBA First Team (2000); CBA Defensive Player of the Year (2000); CBA All-Defensive Team (2000)
- Stats at NBA.com
- Stats at Basketball Reference

Maceo Demond Baston (born May 29, 1976) is an American former professional basketball player. He played college basketball for the Michigan Wolverines. At a playing height of 6 ft 10 in (2.08 m), and a playing weight of 230 pounds (104 kg), he played at the power forward position.

== High school ==
Baston attended H. Grady Spruce High School, in Dallas, Texas, where he played basketball.

== College career ==
After graduating from high school, Baston played college basketball at the University of Michigan. He was part of an all-star recruiting class by the Wolverines that included Maurice Taylor, Travis Conlon, Jerod Ward, and Willie Mitchell. He was known for his above-average dunking ability, and tenacious defense. Baston averaged 10.7 points and 6.6 rebounds a game for his Michigan career, which included NCAA Tournament appearances in 1995 and 1998, and the National Invitation Tournament Championship in 1997. Michigan later forfeited its entire 1996–97 season schedule, after Robert Traylor, Maurice Taylor, and Louis Bullock were found to have taken money from a Michigan booster.

== Professional career ==
=== Early career ===
Baston was drafted in the second round (58th overall), by the Chicago Bulls, in 1998, but he did not appear in any games for them. He then played for the Quad City Thunder in the CBA from 1998 to 2000, where he was a CBA All-Star in 2000. He was honored as the CBA Defensive Player of the Year, and selected to the All-CBA First Team and All-Defensive Team in 2000. After that, he played in Europe. He played in Italy (SC Montecatini), and in Spain (Joventut Badalona).

=== Toronto Raptors ===
After playing in Europe, Baston played with the NBA's Toronto Raptors (February–April 2003).

=== Maccabi Tel Aviv ===
After playing with the NBA's Toronto Raptors, Baston moved to the Israeli League club Maccabi Tel Aviv. While with Maccabi, Baston set the EuroLeague Final Four record for blocks in a game, with 6 versus Tau Ceramica, in the 2006 EuroLeague Semifinals.

=== Indiana Pacers ===
On July 28, 2006, the NBA's Indiana Pacers signed Baston to a two-year deal, worth $1.8 million, with the second year being a player option. He appeared in 47 games with the team, and averaged 3 points per game.

=== Return to Raptors ===
On July 11, 2007, Baston signed an offer sheet to return to the Raptors, worth roughly US$3.8 million, over two years. The Pacers declined to match the offer.

=== Return to Pacers ===
The Pacers reacquired Baston on July 9, 2008, in a trade with the Raptors, which also included Jermaine O'Neal and T. J. Ford.

=== Detroit Pistons ===
Baston, along with point guard Chucky Atkins, signed non-guaranteed contracts with the Detroit Pistons, on September 28, 2009. The Pistons waived Baston on October 21, 2009.

=== Budivelnyk Kyiv ===
Despite having contract conversations with the Serbian club Partizan Belgrade, Baston instead signed with the Ukrainian club Budivelnyk Kyiv, on March 1, 2010. However, he only played in one game with the club, due to physical problems he was having at the time.

=== Bnei HaSharon ===
In November 2010, Baston returned to Israel, signing with Bnei HaSharon. However, after playing in seven games with the club, he left the team in January 2011.

== Coaching ==
Now he works as a basketball coach and substitute teacher at Newman International Academy Gibbins in Texas.

== NBA career statistics ==
Legend
GP	Games played	GS	Games started	MPG	Minutes per game
FG%	Field goal percentage	3P%	3-point field goal percentage	FT%	Free throw percentage
RPG	Rebounds per game	APG	Assists per game	SPG	Steals per game
BPG	Blocks per game	PPG	Points per game	**Bold**	Career high

=== Regular season ===
Year	Team	GP	GS	MPG	FG%	3P%	FT%	RPG	APG	SPG	BPG	PPG
2002–03	Toronto	16	0	6.6	.600	.000	**.833**	1.4	.0	**.3**	**.7**	2.5
2006–07	Indiana	**47**	2	**8.6**	.645	**.429**	.787	1.4	**.3**	**.3**	.4	**2.9**
2007–08	Toronto	15	**2**	6.9	**.680**	.000	.700	1.7	.2	.1	.3	2.7
2008–09	Indiana	27	0	8.0	.543	.000	.630	**1.9**	**.3**	.2	.4	2.5
Career		105	4	7.9	.616	.375	.740	1.7	.2	.2	.4	2.7

=== Playoffs ===
Year	Team	GP	GS	MPG	FG%	3P%	FT%	RPG	APG	SPG	BPG	PPG
2008	Toronto	1	0	1.0	.000	.000	.000	.0	.0	1.0	.0	.0
Career		1	0	1.0	.000	.000	.000	.0	.0	1.0	.0	.0
