= Pini Gershon =

Israeli basketball player and coach

Pini Gershon פיני גרשון
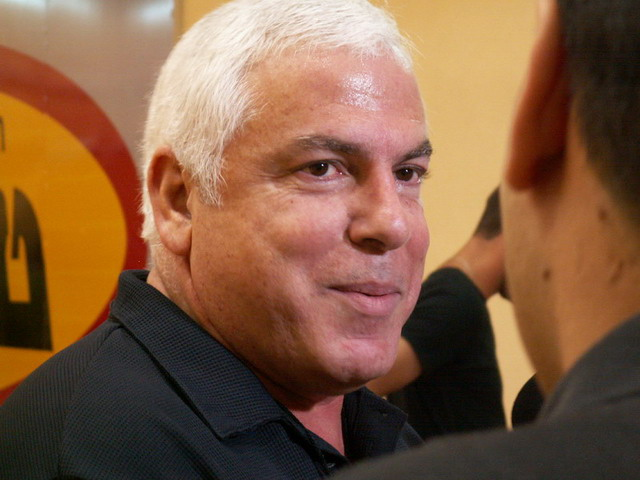
- Gershon in 2005.

Personal information
- Born: November 13, 1951 (age 75) Tel Aviv, Israel

Career information
- Playing career: 1970–1974
- Coaching career: 1974–2015

Career history

Playing
- 1970–1974: Maccabi South Tel Aviv

Coaching
- 1974–1976: Beitar Tel Aviv (youth)
- 1976–1977: Beitar Tel Aviv
- 1977–1979: Hapoel Holon
- 1980–1981: Hapoel Gan Shmuel
- 1981–1983: Hapoel Galil Elyon
- 1983–1985: Maccabi Haifa
- 1985–1986: Hapoel Tel Aviv
- 1986–1987: Maccabi Haifa
- 1987–1988: Beitar Tel Aviv
- 1988–1989: Maccabi Haifa
- 1989–1990: Hapoel Haifa
- 1990–1992: Ironi Ramat Gan
- 1992–1993: Hapoel Galil Elyon
- 1993–1994: Maccabi Rishon Lezion
- 1994–1995: Hapoel Galil Elyon
- 1995–1997: Hapoel Jerusalem
- 1997–1998: Maccabi Rishon Lezion
- 1998–2001, 2003-2006: Maccabi Tel Aviv
- 2006–2008: Olympiacos
- 2007–2008: Bulgaria
- 2008–2010: Maccabi Tel Aviv
- 2011–2013: Hapoel Holon (manager)
- 2014–2015: Maccabi Tel Aviv (assistant)
- 2015–present: Israel (manager)

Career highlights
- As head coach: 2× EuroLeague champion (2004, 2005); FIBA SuproLeague champion (2001); EuroLeague Coach of the Year (2005); 50 Greatest EuroLeague Contributors (2008); 8× Israeli League champion (1993, 1999–2001, 2004–2006, 2009); 8× Israeli Cup winner (1996, 1999–2001, 2004–2006, 2010); Israeli League Coach of the Year (1993)

Pinhas Yair Gershon (Hebrew: פנחס "פיני" גרשון; born 13 November 1951), is an Israeli former professional basketball player and coach. He won three top-level European-wide club championships as the head coach of Maccabi Tel Aviv. He won the FIBA SuproLeague championship in 2001, and the EuroLeague championship in 2004 and 2005. He is widely regarded as one of the greatest coaches in Israeli and European history.

He was named the EuroLeague Coach of the Year in 2005. In 2008, he was named one of the 50 Greatest EuroLeague Contributors, as a coach. He was also the head coach of the senior Bulgarian national team.

== Early life ==
Gershon grew up and studied in the city of Tel Aviv. His mother was a Moroccan Jew and his father was a Bulgarian Jew. He experienced a rough childhood, as his biological father abandoned the family when he was one year old and left him with his mother, in poverty conditions and moved to England; his step-father was abusive towards him, his sister and their mother.

== Basketball biography ==
=== Playing career ===
In his youth, Gershon was a basketball player. He played for the "Maccabi South Tel Aviv" club, which was a sister team of Maccabi Tel Aviv, and he was one of the stars in its cadets team. He played for a number of years, including in the senior men's team of Maccabi South Tel Aviv, but his career as a basketball player ended at the age of 24, as the result of an injury.

=== Club coaching career ===
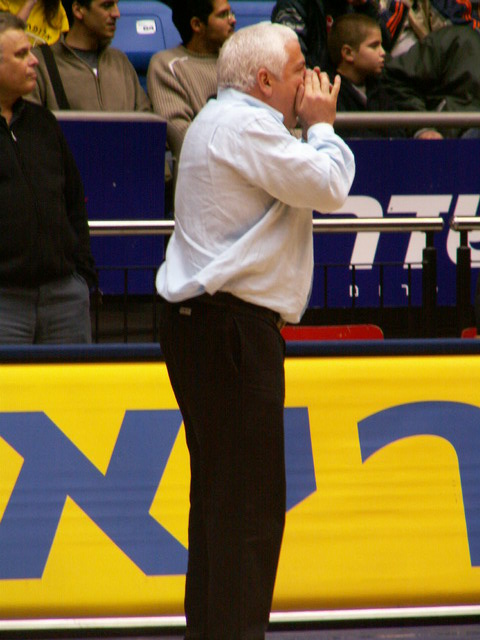
Pini Gershon on the court

After a short career as a basketball player, Gershon began to coach in different Israeli teams, among them, Maccabi Rishon LeZion, Hapoel Galil Elyon, Hapoel Gan Shmuel-Menashe, Hapoel Tel Aviv and Hapoel Jerusalem.

In 1993, he led Hapoel Galil Elyon to the Israeli League championship, which was the first time in 36 years that it had not been won by Maccabi Tel Aviv. In 1996, Gershon won the Israeli State Cup, while he was the head coach of Hapoel Jerusalem, after beating Maccabi in the final.

In different interviews, he expressed himself poignantly against Maccabi Tel Aviv, and against the club's dominance of Israeli basketball. Therefore, it was quite a surprise when he became Maccabi Tel Aviv's head coach at the end of 1998. At that time, Maccabi Tel Aviv was in a professional crisis, after several years of failing to enter the top stages of the EuroLeague, a status which it had enjoyed in the past.

Under his, and his assistant David Blatt's lead, Maccabi Tel Aviv surprisingly advanced to the 2000 EuroLeague Finals, where they lost to the Greek Basket League powerhouse Panathinaikos, in the final game. A year later, Maccabi won the 2001 FIBA SuproLeague championship. However, this achievement was overshadowed by the split between the two major European basketball unions at that time, into two separate leagues, which meant that most of the top European teams did not compete against Maccabi, but were instead in that season's EuroLeague competition.

After the 2000–01 season, Gershon took a break from coaching, mainly to do some self-searching and to travel around the world. This temporary retirement lasted for two seasons, and in the summer of 2003, Gershon returned to his former position as the head coach of Maccabi. He had the goal of reaching the 2004 EuroLeague Final Four, which took place in Tel Aviv. That goal was two seconds away from failure, when Maccabi, who was hosting Žalgiris in the game for the last spot in the EuroLeague Final Four, had to come from behind. A marvelous three-point buzzer-beater by Derrick Sharp sent that game into overtime, in which Maccabi won and advanced to the Final Four. Maccabi, under Gershon, went on to have an unforgettable Final Four, crushing Skipper Bologna 118–74 in the final, to become the EuroLeague champions for the fourth time (including the 2001 FIBA SuproLeague title).

In 2005, Gershon led Maccabi Tel Aviv to another EuroLeague championship. Having been the league favorites all season long, Maccabi Tel Aviv advanced to the 2005 EuroLeague Final Four, in Moscow. The expected final was supposed to be between Maccabi and the hosts CSKA Moscow. However, CSKA surprisingly lost its semifinal game to TAU Vitoria. In the final, Maccabi easily beat TAU, by a score of 90–78. Gershon was later named the EuroLeague Coach of the Year. During the 2005–06 season, Gershon hinted that it would be his last season with Maccabi. He led the team to the 2006 EuroLeague Final Four. That time, however, Maccabi lost in the title game to CSKA Moscow, by a score of 73–69. Gershon left Maccabi at the end of the season, and signed with the Greek club Olympiacos.

In his first season as head coach of Olympiacos, Gershon led the team to the Greek Basket League finals against Panathinaikos, and to the last 8 of the EuroLeague season, where the team was eliminated by TAU Cerámica. Accusations of racism were raised, mainly by Olympiacos fans, concerning the lack of playing time for team star and crowd favorite, Sofoklis Schortsanitis.

On November 24, 2008, he signed on as Maccabi Tel Aviv's head coach, after the dismissal of Effi Birnbaum from the position. In October 2009, he was ejected from an exhibition game against the New York Knicks. Gershon took close to 6 minutes to exit the court, as NBA rules (administered by replacement on-court officials) differ from international rules, regarding technical fouls, which cause coaches to be automatically ejected. In 2010, Gershon parted ways with Maccabi, after their loss to Hapoel Gilboa Galil, in the Israeli League national finals. In August 2014, he signed a one-season contract to be Guy Goodes' assistant coach with Maccabi Tel Aviv.

=== National team coaching career ===
Gershon worked as an assistant coach for the senior Israeli national basketball team. In September 2008, Gershon led the senior Bulgarian national basketball team to qualify for the EuroBasket 2009, in Poland, after a surprising finish ahead of the strongly favored Italian national basketball team in the preliminary round. In 2010, he parted ways with the Bulgarian national team, due to a dispute with the Bulgarian Basketball Federation.

== Personal life ==
Gershon often eagerly voices his belief in the part that divine guidance has had in his career. He has close ties with the Chabad movement.

In the year 2001, Gershon was accused of racism, after reporters found a video showing Gershon lecturing before a group of IDF officers. In this lecture, Gershon made some controversial remarks about African American people,“The mocha-colored guys are smarter, but the dark colored ones are just guys off the street,” he said. “They’re dumb like slaves, they do whatever you tell them.” Gershon claimed that those remarks were only made as a joke, and that they were not reflective of his real opinions.

Gershon was once a major shareholder of EZTD Inc., a firm in the controversial binary options industry. EZTD Inc. owned the EZTrader.com and GlobalOption.com websites, and settled a 2016 US Securities and Exchange Commission finding, by paying $1.7 million in fines and compensation to victims. EZTD Inc. was accused of illegally soliciting and taking money from 4,000 US investors.

== Club titles won as a head coach ==
- European Club Championship: 3
  - EuroLeague: 2 (with Maccabi Tel-Aviv: 2004, 2005)
  - FIBA SuproLeague: 1 (with Maccabi Tel-Aviv: 2001)
- Israeli Super League: 8 (7 with Maccabi Tel-Aviv, 1 with Hapoel Galil Elyon)
- Israeli State Cup: 8 (7 with Maccabi Tel-Aviv, 1 with Hapoel Jerusalem)

== See also ==
- List of EuroLeague-winning head coaches
