= Guy Goodes =

Israeli basketball player and coach

Guy Goodes גיא גודס
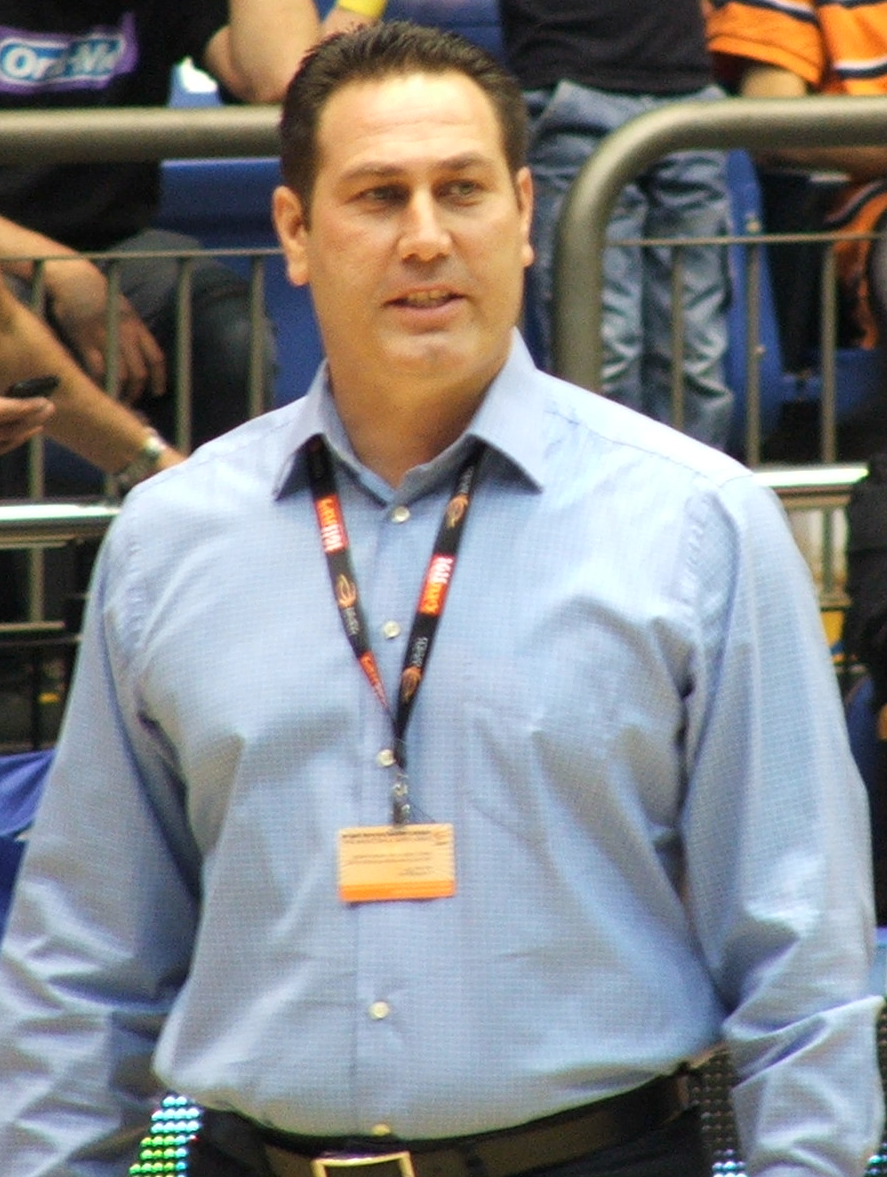
- Goodes in 2011

Personal information
- Born: 13 March 1971 (age 55) Haifa, Israel
- Listed height: 1.90 m (6 ft 3 in)

Career information
- NBA draft: 1992: undrafted
- Playing career: 1986–2004
- Position: Point guard
- Coaching career: 2004–present

Career history

Playing
- 1986–1990: Hapoel Haifa
- 1990–1997: Maccabi Tel Aviv
- 1997–1998: Caserta
- 1998–1999: Maccabi Tel Aviv
- 1999–2000: Caja Cantabria
- 2000–2001: Cordiviari Roseto
- 2001: Maccabi Raanana
- 2001–2002: Hapoel Tel Aviv
- 2002–2004: Maccabi Rishon Lezion

Coaching
- 2004–2006: Maccabi Rishon Lezion
- 2006–2008: Maccabi Tel Aviv (assistant)
- 2008–2010: Hapoel Jerusalem
- 2010–2014: Maccabi Tel Aviv (assistant)
- 2014–2015: Maccabi Tel Aviv
- 2013–2015: Great Britain (assistant)
- 2017–2018: Maccabi Tel Aviv (assistant)
- 2018–2021: Maccabi Rishon Lezion
- 2019–2021: Israel U-20
- 2021–2023: Israel
- 2022–2023: Hapoel Holon
- 2023–2024: Hapoel Haifa
- 2024–2025: Hapoel Holon

Career highlights
- As head coach: Israeli League champion (2022); Israeli Cup winner (2015); As assistant coach: EuroLeague champion (2014); 4× Israeli League champion (2011, 2012, 2014, 2018); 4× Israeli Cup winner (2011–2014)

Guy Goodes (Hebrew: גיא גודס; born 13 March 1971) is an Israeli professional basketball coach and former player. He was most recently the head coach of Hapoel Holon of the Israeli Premier League.

== Professional career ==
Goodes played as a point guard from 1994 to 2004, primarily with Maccabi Tel Aviv (1990–97 and 1998–99). He was on the Israel basketball national team from 1995 to 1999.

== Coaching career ==
He was head coach of Maccabi Rishon Lezion in 2004–06. Later, he was an assistant coach at Maccabi Tel Aviv from 2006 to 2008.

In June 2008, Hapoel Jerusalem hired him as its head coach, to a one-year contract with a team option for a second year. He coached the team from 2008 until 2010. Following his time with Hapoel Jerusalem, he became an assistant coach with Maccabi Tel Aviv. In 2014, he won the EuroLeague title with Maccabi. Later in June 2014, after the departure of David Blatt, he was named the new head coach of the team. He was dismissed on 9 November 2015, due to the poor results.

On 27 June 2017, Goodes returned to Maccabi Tel Aviv as the assistant coach. Goodes helped Maccabi win the 2018 Israeli League Championship.

On 30 November 2018, Goodes returned to Maccabi Rishon Lezion as the new head coach, replacing Zvika Sherf. Goodes led Rishon LeZion to the 2019 Israeli League Final, where they eventually lost to his former team Maccabi Tel Aviv.

On 16 November 2019, Goodes was named new head coach of the Israel under-20 national team, replacing Ariel Beit-Halahmy.

After a short stint coaching the Israel U-20 national team, Goodes was appointed new head coach of the senior Israel national team on 14 September 2021. He would succeed Oded Katash in the role.

In January 2022, Goodes was named new head coach of Hapoel Holon, in addition to his role as head coach of the Israel national team.
