= Regev Fanan =

Israeli basketball player

Regev Fanan רגב פנאן

Maccabi Tel Aviv
- Title: Athletic trainer
- League: Israeli Premier League; EuroLeague

Personal information
- Born: 23 November 1981 (age 44) Israel
- Listed height: 6 ft 0 in (1.83 m)

Career information
- Playing career: 2000–2008
- Position: Guard
- Number: 10

Career history

Playing
- 2000–2002: Maccabi Tel Aviv
- 2002–2003: Hapoel Galil Elyon
- 2003–2004: Ironi Ramat Gan
- 2004–2008: Maccabi Tel Aviv

Coaching
- 2009–2013: Bnei Herzliya (Athletic trainer)
- 2013–present: Maccabi Tel Aviv (Athletic trainer)

Career highlights
- FIBA SuproLeague champion (2001); Euroleague champion (2005)

Regev Fanan (Hebrew: רגב פנאן; born 23 November 1981) is a former Israeli professional basketball player who is currently the athletic trainer for Maccabi Tel Aviv. Fanan played most of his professional career with Maccabi, and also played for Hapoel Galil Elyon and Ironi Ramat Gan. He is the son of Moni Fanan.

== Honours ==
- FIBA SuproLeague Champion 2001
- Euroleague Champion 2005
- Israeli Basketball Super League Champion 2001, 2002, 2005, 2006, 2007
- Israeli Basketball State Cup Champion 2001, 2002, 2005, 2006
