= David Blu =

American–Israeli basketball player

David Blu דיוויד בלו
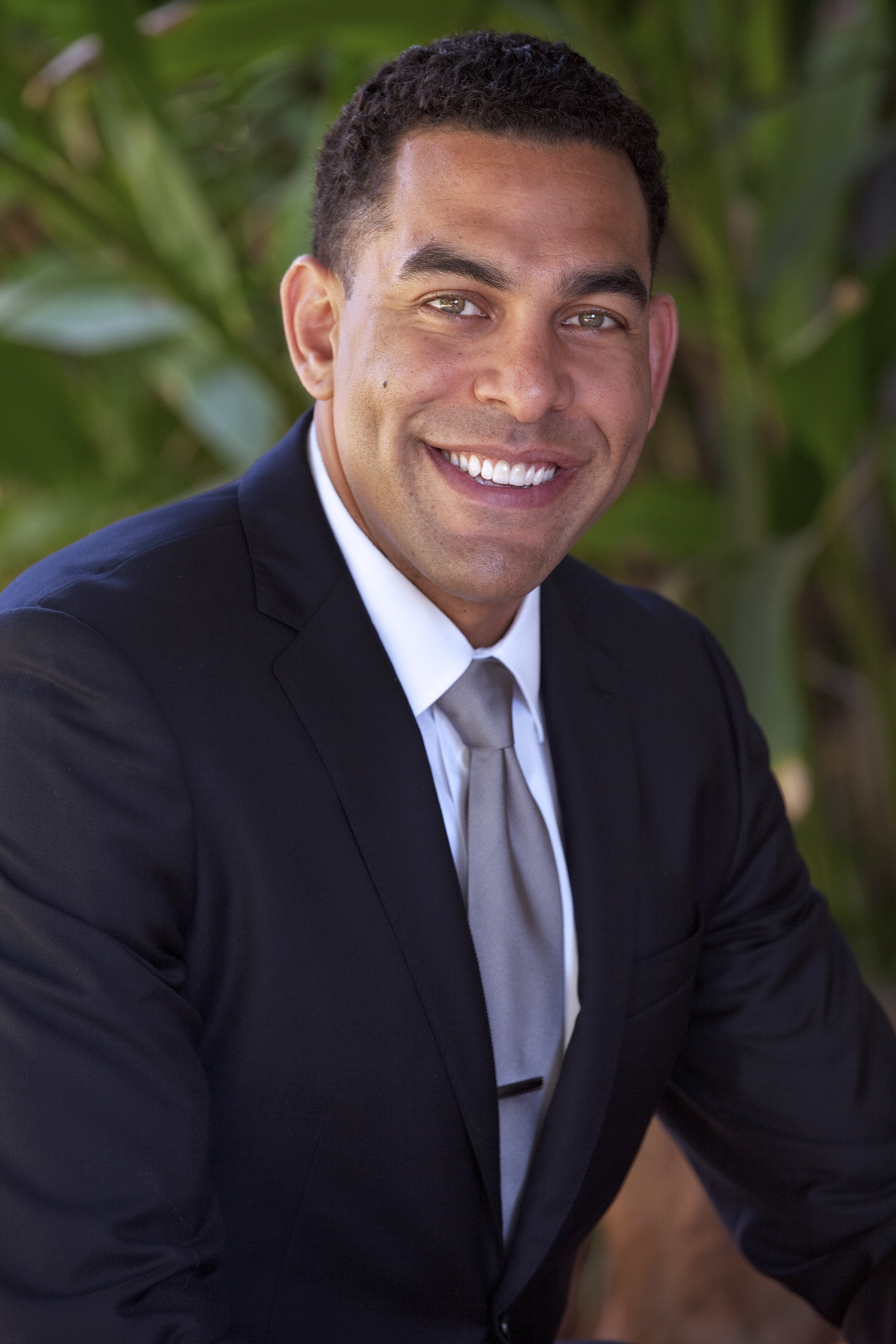
- Blu in 2017

Personal information
- Born: July 18, 1980 (age 46) Los Angeles, California, U.S.
- Listed height: 6 ft 7 in (2.01 m)
- Listed weight: 225 lb (102 kg)

Career information
- High school: Venice (Los Angeles, California); Westchester (Los Angeles, California)
- College: USC (1998–2002)
- NBA draft: 2002: undrafted
- Playing career: 2002–2014
- Position: Small forward / power forward
- Number: 7, 13, 15, 33

Career history
- 2002–2004: Maccabi Tel Aviv
- 2004: BC Dynamo Saint Petersburg
- 2004–2005: Benetton Treviso
- 2005–2006: Virtus Bologna
- 2006–2007: Fortitudo Bologna
- 2007–2008: Maccabi Tel Aviv
- 2008–2009: Le Mans
- 2009–2012: Maccabi Tel Aviv
- 2013–2014: Maccabi Tel Aviv

Career highlights
- 2× EuroLeague champion (2004, 2014); 5× Israeli Super League champion (2003, 2004, 2011, 2012, 2014); 6× Israeli Cup winner (2003, 2004, 2010–2012, 2014); 4× Israeli Supercup winner (2007, 2010, 2011, 2013); Israeli Super League Finals MVP (2011); Israeli Super League Sixth Man of the Year (2014); Israeli Super League Discovery of the Year (2003); Israeli Supercup MVP (2007); Italian Cup winner (2005); French Leaders Cup winner (2009); French Leaders Cup MVP (2009); French Cup winner (2009); Adriatic League champion (2012)

David Blu (Hebrew: דיוויד בלו; born David Bluthenthal; July 18, 1980) is an American–Israeli former professional basketball player, who spent 10 seasons playing in the EuroLeague. Standing at 6 ft 7 in (2.01 m), he played at the small forward and power forward positions. He is considered to be one of the top three-point shooters in EuroLeague history. He was also the 2011 Israeli Basketball Premier League Finals MVP. He also represented the senior Israeli national team in 2010.

== Early life ==
Blu was born in Los Angeles, California, and is Jewish. His mother was Jewish, and his African American father converted to Judaism. He represented the United States at the 1997 Maccabiah Games, winning a gold medal.

Blu attended Palms Middle School, and Venice High School and Westchester High School.

== College career ==
Blu attended the University of Southern California (USC), which was founded by his great-great-granduncle, Isaias Hellman. A starter from his sophomore season on, he was consistently one of the top players in the Pac-10.

In 2001–02, his senior season, Blu was named All-Pac 10 honorable mention. He averaged 12.1 points, 7.5 rebounds, and 1.2 assists per game. He left school in 2002, to pursue a career in professional basketball. His most memorable performance remains the 27 points he scored against Kentucky, in an NCAA regional semifinal upset in 2001, made by the USC Trojans team that was led by Blu.

== Professional career ==
=== Maccabi Tel Aviv ===
After Blu completed his 4 years of college athletics eligibility, he decided to play professional basketball in Europe, and signed with Israeli professional team Maccabi Tel Aviv, of the EuroLeague. During two years with Maccabi Tel Aviv (2002–04), he helped the team to the EuroLeague championship in 2004, and to the Israeli National Cup title twice. He scored 20 points off the bench, in the 2004 EuroLeague Final, a 44-point Maccabi annihilation of one of the best team in Europe, Fortitudo Bologna.

Following the 2004 season, Blu was signed by the NBA's Sacramento Kings, on August 7, 2004, but he was released in November, before the 2004–05 season started.

=== Dynamo St. Petersburg ===
Following his release from Sacramento, Blu received an offer from the Russian team BC Dynamo Saint Petersburg, that had just signed David Blatt, who was the head coach of Maccabi Tel Aviv, during the time that Blu was there. In 8 games played in the Russian Basketball Super League A, he shot 69.6% from 2-point range.

=== Italian teams ===
After two months in Russia, Blu went to Italy, to play for Benetton Treviso. He shot over 60% from 2-point range, and over 51% from 3-point range, in the Italian League.

In the summer of 2005, he signed with Virtus Bologna, and became one of their top players, with a scoring average of 20.2 points per game in the Italian League.

After the 2005–06 season, he signed with Virtus' intense crosstown rivals, Fortitudo. During the 2006–07 season, for Fortitudo, he averaged 16 points and 4.2 rebounds in EuroLeague play, and also made 46.8% of his two-point shots, and 53.3% of his three-pointers.

=== Second stint with Maccabi ===
On June 15, 2007, Blu returned from Fortitudo, to Maccabi Tel Aviv. He averaged 8.7 points and 2.4 rebounds in 25 EuroLeague games for Maccabi, as they advanced to the EuroLeague Finals, against winners CSKA Moscow.

=== Le Mans ===
On July 10, 2008, Blu signed a one-year deal with Le Mans. Over 10 games in the EuroLeague, he averaged 12.5 points and 3.8 rebounds per game.

=== Third stint with Maccabi ===
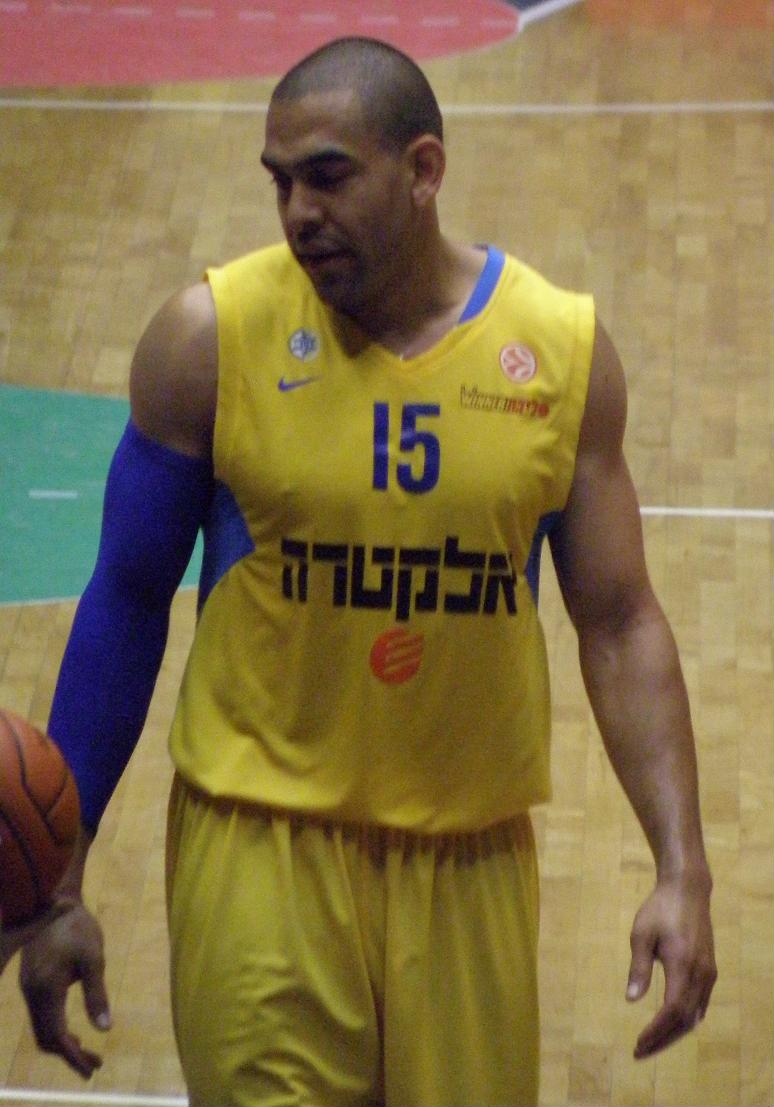
Blu in 2010.

In the summer of 2009, Blu yet again returned to Israel, and signed a one-year contract with Maccabi Tel Aviv. He finished the 2010–11 season with averages of 8.9 points and 3.1 rebounds per game in the EuroLeague, and 10.9 points and 3.9 rebounds per game in the Israeli Super League. He named the 2011 Israeli Basketball Premier League Finals MVP. In July 2011, Maccabi extended Blu's contract for another year.

In June 2012, Blu retired for the first time, in order to complete his college education in the USA.

After graduating college in the summer of 2013, Blu signed a new contract with Maccabi Tel Aviv. Following his comeback, after an up and down season, Maccabi won the 2014 EuroLeague championship, the sixth in the club's history, and his second. Over the season, he averaged 10.1 points and 3.2 rebounds per game, over 30 games played in the EuroLeague. In the EuroLeague Final Four, he helped his team oust CSKA Moscow in the semifinals, by scoring 15 points, with some crucial three-pointers. In the championship finals game, against Real Madrid, he scored 14 points and grabbed 4 rebounds. Once the season ended, Blu announced his retirement from playing professional basketball.

== National team career ==
In the summer of 2010, Blu represented Israel, and he made his first appearance with them against Portugal, on July 19, 2010. Blu also competed with the senior Israeli national team at the EuroBasket 2011, where he averaged 12.8 points per game and 3.2 rebounds per game.

== Accolades ==
In 2006 he was inducted into the Southern California Jewish Sports Hall of Fame.

== Career statistics ==
Legend
GP	Games played	GS	Games started	MPG	Minutes per game
FG%	Field-goal percentage	3P%	3-point field-goal percentage	FT%	Free-throw percentage
RPG	Rebounds per game	APG	Assists per game	SPG	Steals per game
BPG	Blocks per game	PPG	Points per game	PIR	Performance index rating
**Bold**	Career high

=== EuroLeague ===
†	Denotes season in which Blu won the EuroLeague
*	Led the league

Year	Team	GP	GS	MPG	FG%	3P%	FT%	RPG	APG	SPG	BPG	PPG	PIR
2002–03	Maccabi	14	0	11.1	.522	.368	.700	1.8	.4	.3	.0	4.4	4.3
2003–04†	Maccabi	17	0	10.2	**.609**	.462	.789	1.4	.4	.2	.1	6.2	4.5
2004–05	Treviso	10	0	18.1	.393	.276	.500	2.5	.9	.8	**.3**	5.8	4.7
2006–07	Fortitudo Bologna	14	10	31.7	.491	**.533***	.828	**4.2**	**1.2**	.6	.1	**16.0**	**13.4**
2007–08	Maccabi	25*	**18**	21.0	.488	.456	**.929**	2.4	.6	.3	.1	8.7	6.6
2008–09	Le Mans	10	8	**32.9**	.413	.360	.913	3.8	1.1	**1.2**	.0	12.5	11.2
2009–10	Maccabi	19	1	23.6	.409	.363	.880	3.0	1.1	.5	.1	9.3	7.2
2010–11	Maccabi	22	1	23.0	.448	.432	.727	3.1	.6	.8	.1	8.9	6.6
2011–12	Maccabi	20	6	24.6	.447	.375	.880	2.5	.5	.6	.0	9.3	6.4
2013–14†	Maccabi	**30**	6	24.8	.433	.406	.816	3.2	1.0	.6	.0	10.1	8.2
Career		181	50	22.1	.457	.411	.833	2.8	.8	.5	.1	9.1	7.2

== See also ==
- List of select Jewish basketball players
