= Zvi Sherf =

Israeli basketball player and coach

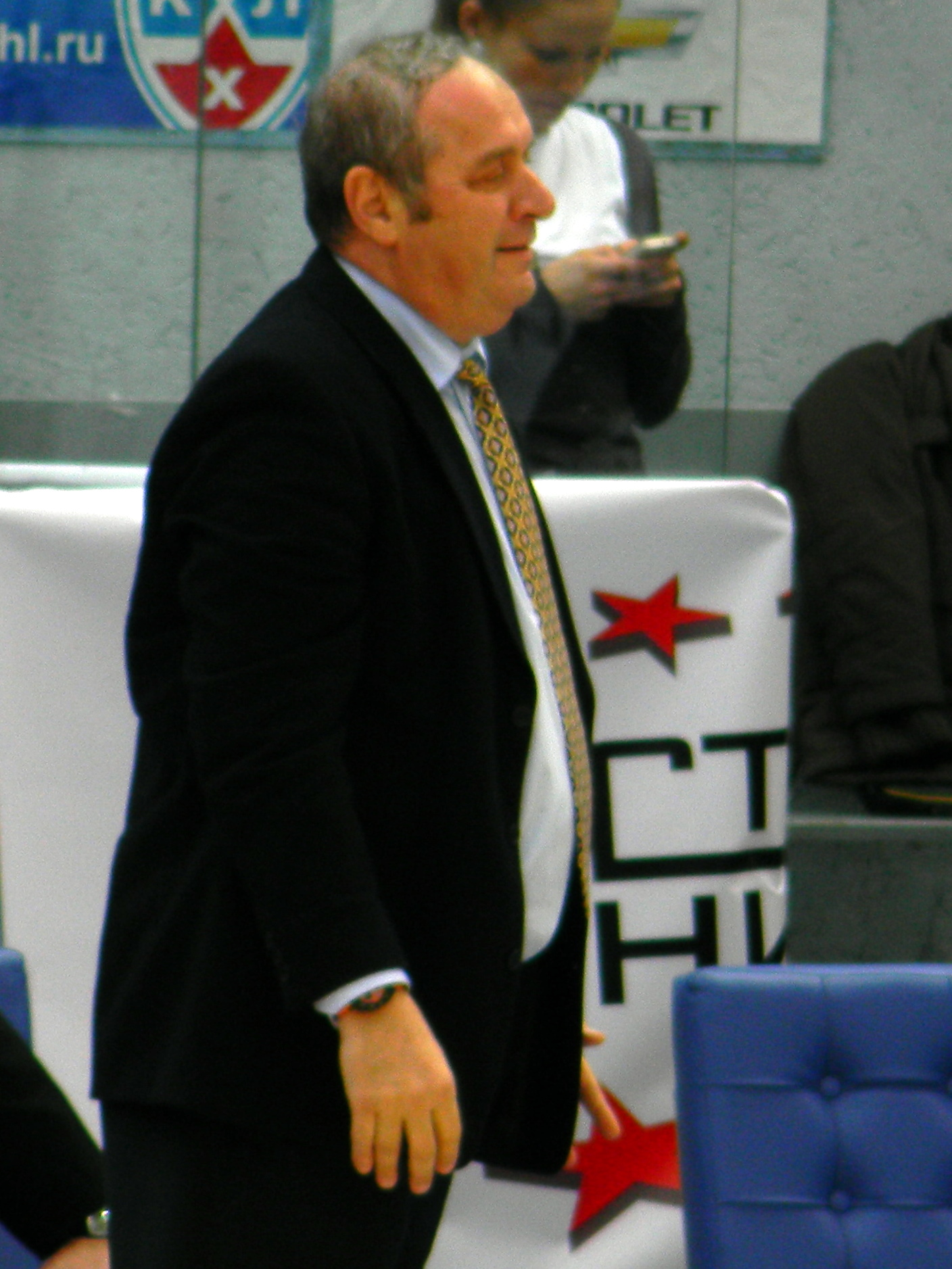
- Sherf in 2011

Personal information
- Born: December 18, 1951 (age 74) Tel Aviv, Israel
- Position: Head coach

Career history

Playing
- 1967–1970: Maccabi Tel Aviv

Coaching
- 1976–1978: Maccabi Darom Tel Aviv
- 1978–1980: Beitar Jerusalem
- 1981–1983: Hapoel Ramat Gan
- 1983–1987: Maccabi Tel Aviv
- 1986–1987: Israel
- 1987–1988: Maccabi Elitzur Netanya
- 1988–1989: Maccabi Tel Aviv
- 1989–1990: Maccabi Rishon LeZion
- 1990–1992: Maccabi Tel Aviv
- 1992: Hapoel Jerusalem
- 1992–1993: Aris
- 1993–1997: Israel
- 1993–1995: Hapoel Tel Aviv
- 1995–1996: CSP Limoges
- 1996–1997: Maccabi Tel Aviv
- 1997–1999: PAOK Thessaloniki
- 1999–2001: Hapoel Jerusalem
- 2001–2002: Śląsk Wrocław
- 2002: Makedonikos
- 2002–2003: Hapoel Galil-Elyon
- 2003–2005: Dynamo Moscow
- 2005–2009: Israel
- 2007–2008: Maccabi Tel Aviv
- 2009–2011: Spartak Saint Petersburg
- 2013–2014: Maccabi Rishon LeZion
- 2015–2016: Maccabi Ashdod
- 2018: Maccabi Rishon LeZion

Career highlights
- As head coach: FIBA Saporta Cup champion (1993); Russian Cup winner (2011); 10× Israeli Super League champion (1984–1987, 1989–1992); 6× Israeli State Cup winner (1985, 1986, 1987, 1989, 1990, 1991); Israeli League Cup winner (2018)

Zvi Sherf (Hebrew: צבי שרף; born December 18, 1951, in Tel Aviv, Israel), known almost universally by his nickname Zvika (Hebrew: צביקה), is an Israeli former basketball player and professional basketball coach.

== Coaching career ==
Sherf played basketball with the Maccabi Tel Aviv youth teams, starting at age 12. By age 16, Sherf was playing for Maccabi South Tel Aviv (the club's second side), and was sent to a coaching course, along with fellow future Israeli basketball coach Pini Gershon. By age 20, Sherf was coaching the Maccabi Tel Aviv youth teams, and by age 25, he was coaching Maccabi South Tel Aviv, leading it to his first championship.

In the 1980–81 season, when Maccabi Tel Aviv won the EuroLeague, the Israeli League and the Israeli State Cup titles, Sherf was an assistant coach to Rudy D'Amico. Sherf became Maccabi Tel Aviv's head coach in the 1983–84 season, and stayed in that role through the 1985–86 season. In 1984, (at the age of 33), he became the senior men's Israeli national basketball team head coach.

His first Israeli national team coaching tenure (which lasted three years), saw two EuroBasket appearances (1985, 1987) and Israel's historic 7th place finish at the 1986 FIBA World Basketball Championship. Sherf's tenure as national team head coach ended after what was perceived as a poor performance at EuroBasket 1987 (11th position), but Sherf later returned as the team's head coach for the years 1991-97. In 2005, Sherf was again appointed head coach of the Israeli national basketball team, and on January 1, 2008, he was appointed head coach of Maccabi Tel Aviv.

Sherf's coaching career includes a Saporta Cup title with Aris Thessaloniki (1992–93), three EuroLeague Finals appearances, 10 Israeli League championships, and six Israeli State Cup titles (all with Maccabi Tel Aviv).

On April 10, 2018, Sherf returned to Maccabi Rishon LeZion for a third stint, replacing Shmulik Brener. On November 26, 2018, Sherf parted ways with Rishon LeZion.

== Honors and awards ==
=== Israeli titles ===
- 10× Israeli Super League Champion: (1983–84, 1984–85, 1985–86, 1986–87, 1988–89, 1989–90, 1990–91, 1991–92, all with Maccabi Tel Aviv);
- 6× Israeli State Cup Winner: (1984–85, 1985–86, 1986–87, 1988–89, 1989–90, 1990–91, all with Maccabi Tel Aviv).

=== European honors and titles ===
- FIBA Saporta Cup Champion: (1992–93, with Aris Thessaloniki);
- 3× EuroLeague Finalist: (1986–87, 1988–89, 2007–08 with Maccabi Tel Aviv);
- EuroLeague Final Four: third-place (1990–91, with Maccabi Tel Aviv).
- Russian Cup Winner: (2010–11, with Spartak St. Petersburg)
