= Moni Fanan =

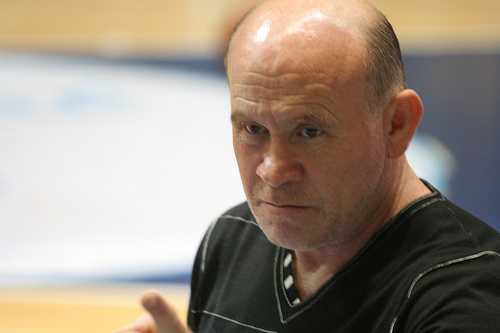

Shimon (Moni) Fanan (Hebrew: מוני פנאן; 11 May 1946 – 19 October 2009) was the team manager of the Israeli basketball team Maccabi Tel Aviv in 1992–2008.

== Managerial career ==
Fanan began his career with Maccabi in the club's football team as chairman of the youth department. Being a devoted fan of the basketball team, he sat close to the players benches during games. He became a member of the group's management in 1986, and with the retirement of the team manager Shmuel Maharovsky in 1992, Fanan was appointed to replace him. In December 2006 Fanan announced his retirement but shortly after renounced it, ultimately retiring in 2008.

== Death ==
Fanan committed suicide on 19 October 2009, reportedly owing $20m. After his death allegations arose that he had been running a private bank handling investments from Maccabi players.
