= Tal Burstein =

Israeli basketball player and coach

Tal Burstein טל בורשטיין
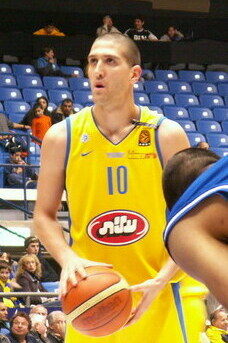
- Burstein with Maccabi Tel Aviv

Personal information
- Born: 19 February 1980 (age 46) Petah Tikva, Israel
- Listed height: 1.98 m (6 ft 6 in)
- Listed weight: 95 kg (209 lb)

Career information
- Playing career: 1997–2012
- Position: Shooting guard
- Number: 10, 11
- Coaching career: 2017–present

Career history

Playing
- 1997–2000: Bnei Herzliya
- 2000–2009: Maccabi Tel Aviv
- 2009–2010: Baloncesto Fuenlabrada
- 2010–2012: Maccabi Tel Aviv

Coaching
- 2017–2018: Maccabi Tel Aviv (assistant)

Career highlights
- As player: 11× Israeli League champion (2000-2007, 2009, 2011, 2012); 10× Israeli Cup champion (2000-2006, 2010-2012); Adriatic League champion (2012); 2× EuroLeague champion (2004, 2005); FIBA SuproLeague champion (2001)

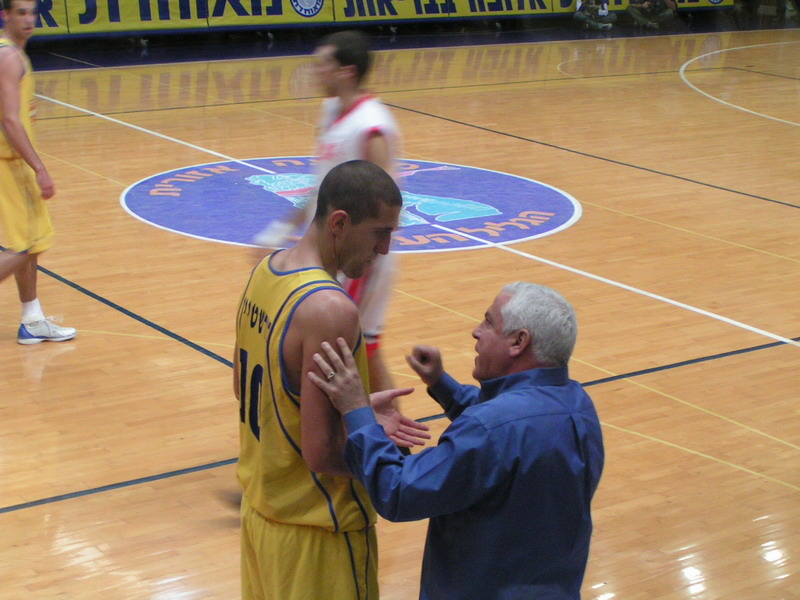
Burstein with Maccabi's former head coach, Pini Gershon

Tal Burstein (Hebrew: טל בורשטיין; born 19 February 1980) is an Israeli professional basketball coach and a former professional basketball player.

He played at the point guard position, and also as a swingman. He is 198 cm (6 ft 6 in) in height. He has also been named as one of the best Israeli basketball players ever.

== Early life ==
Burstein is Jewish, and was born in Petah Tikva, Israel.

== Professional career ==
Tal Burstein began his basketball career with the Bnei-Herzliya junior team. In the 1997–98 season, he made his professional debut and he was named the Israeli League Rookie of the Year. He became a team captain during the 1999–2000 season. In the 2001–02 season, he led the Israeli League in three-point field goal percentage, shooting 49.4%.

Beginning in the 2000–01 season, he played with Maccabi Tel Aviv. He became a starter in his first season in Tel Aviv. With the club, Burstein won 8 Israeli National Championships and 6 Israeli State Cups. He also won 3 European championships with Maccabi, the 2001 FIBA SuproLeague championship, and the EuroLeague championships in the years 2004 and 2005. After the 2008–09 season, Burstein left Maccabi Tel Aviv and signed with the Spanish team Fuenlabrada. A year later, Burstein returned to Maccabi, on a three-year contract.

In August 2012, he announced his retirement from playing professional basketball, after learning that he would have to undergo surgery on his injured hip, which would cause him to miss the entire upcoming season.

== National team career ==
Burstein has played for all of the Israeli junior national teams and also for the senior men's Israeli national basketball team. In August 2000, he was the captain of the Israeli under-20 national team, which won a silver medal at the FIBA Europe Under-20 Championship in Ohrid, Macedonia. In August 2001, Burstein was a member of the Israeli Under-22 national team at the FIBA Under-21 World Championship in Saitama, Japan, where his team finished in 7th place.

He also played with the senior men's team, the Israeli national basketball team at the EuroBasket 2003, in Sweden, where his team finished in 7th place, and at the EuroBasket 2005. Burstein eventually also became the team captain on Israel's senior national team. During his time as a member of Israel's senior national team, he played as the national team's first shooting guard, and he could also play on the team as a point guard, if needed.

== Coaching career ==
On 29 June 2017, Burstein returned to Maccabi Tel Aviv, as an assistant basketball coach.
