= Gur Shelef =

Israeli basketball player

Gur Shelef גור שלף
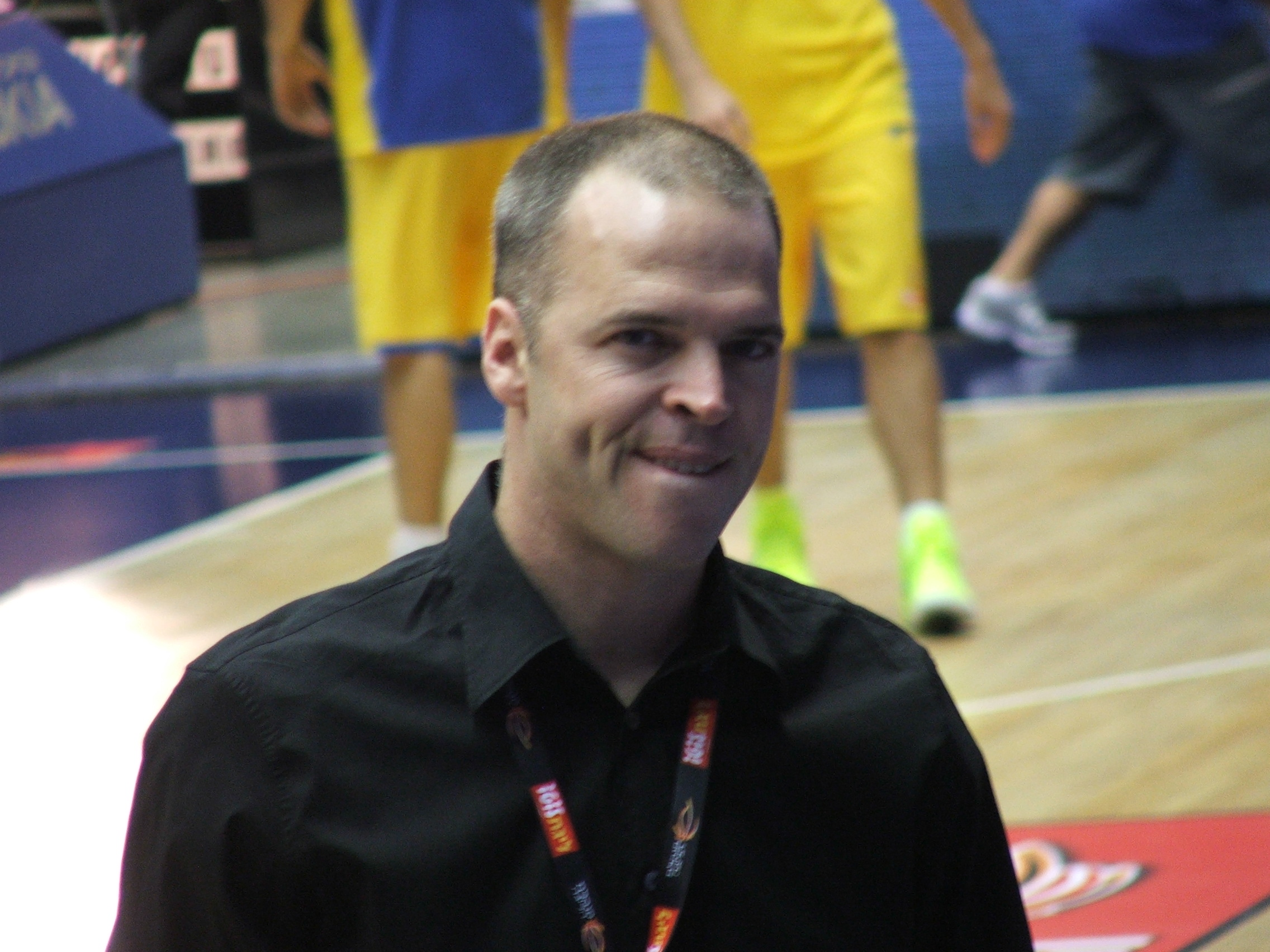

Personal information
- Born: January 10, 1974 (age 52)
- Listed height: 2.01 m (6 ft 7 in)

Career information
- NBA draft: 1996: undrafted
- Playing career: 1992–2007
- Position: Small forward

Career history

Playing
- 1992–1993: Hapoel Gvat/Yagur
- 1993–1995: Ironi Ramat Gan
- 1995–1998: Hapoel Galil Elyon
- 1998–2005: Maccabi Tel Aviv
- 2005–2007: Antwerp Giants

Coaching
- 2008–2013: Maccabi Tel Aviv (manager)

Career highlights
- SuproLeague champion (2001); 2× Euroleague champion (2004, 2005); 7× Israeli League champion (1999–2005); 7× Israeli Cup winner (1999–2005); Belgian Cup winner (2007)

Gur Shelef (Hebrew: גור שלף; born January 10, 1974) is an Israeli former professional basketball player. Standing at 201 cm (6 ft 7 in) he played at the small forward and power forward positions. His father, Ami Shelef, and brother, Uri Shelef, were also basketball players.
