= Rosters of the champion and finalist teams of EuroLeague =

The rosters of each season's champions and finalists of the top-tier level European-wide professional basketball competition in Europe, the EuroLeague. From 1958, through the present.

== 1958 ==
FIBA European Champions Cup

Winner: Rīgas ASK (USSR) Jānis Krūmiņš, Valdis Muižnieks, Maigonis Valdmanis, Gundars Muiznieks, Oļģerts Hehts, Leons Jankovskis, Alvils Gulbis, Teobalds Kalherts, Aivars Leonciks, Juris Kalniņš, Ivars Veritis, Janis Davids, Gunars Silinš (Head Coach: Alexander Gomelsky)

Runner-up: Academic (Bulgaria) Viktor Radev, Georgi Panov, Ljubomir Panov, Mikhail Semov, Konstantin Stoimenov, Nikola Ilov, Atanas Atanasov, Ivan Emanuilov, Ljubomir Dardov, Aleksandar Blagoev, Nejcho Nejchev, Petko Lazarov (Head Coach: Bozhidar Takev)

== 1958–59 ==
FIBA European Champions Cup

Winner: Rīgas ASK (USSR) Jānis Krūmiņš, Valdis Muižnieks, Gundars Muiznieks, Maigonis Valdmanis, Oļģerts Hehts, Leons Jankovskis, Alvils Gulbis, Teobalds Kalherts, Juris Kalniņš, Janis Davids, Aivars Leonciks, Ivars Veritis, Andrejs Bergs, Gunars Silinš, Janis Taurinš, Gunars Jansons (Head Coach: Alexander Gomelsky)

Runner-up: Academic (Bulgaria) Viktor Radev, Ljubomir Panov, Georgi Panov, Mikhail Semov, Petko Lazarov, Konstantin Stoimenov, Atanas Atanasov, Nikola Ilov, Ivan Emanuilov, Gencho Rashkov, Ljubomir Dardov, Georgi Kanev, Emanuil Gjaurov (Head Coach: Bozhidar Takev)

== 1959–60 ==
FIBA European Champions Cup

Winner: Rīgas ASK (USSR) Jānis Krūmiņš, Gundars Muiznieks, Valdis Muižnieks, Maigonis Valdmanis, Juris Kalniņš, Alvils Gulbis, Leons Jankovskis, Oļģerts Hehts, Janis Davids, Ivars Veritis, Aivars Leonciks, Andrejs Bergs, Teobalds Kalherts (Head Coach: Alexander Gomelsky)

Runner-up: Dinamo Tbilisi (USSR) Levan Intskirveli, Guram Minashvili, Anzor Lezhava, Valeri Altabaev, Aleksandre Kiladze, Levan Moseshvili, Givi Abashidze, Vladimer Ugrekhelidze, Revaz Gogelia, Ilarion Khazaradze, Mikheil Asitashvili, Kartlos Dzhaparidze, Tamaz Kakauridze (Head Coach: Otar Korkia)

== 1960–61 ==
FIBA European Champions Cup

Winner: CSKA Moscow (USSR) Gennadi Volnov, Viktor Zubkov, Armenak Alachachian, Mikhail Semyonov, Arkadi Bochkarev, Viktor Kharitonov, Alexander Travin, Anatoli Astakhov, Pavel Sirotinski, Evgeni Karpov, V.Volkov, V.Kopylov (Head Coach: Evgeny Alekseev)

Runner-up: Rīgas ASK (USSR) Jānis Krūmiņš, Jaak Lipso, Maigonis Valdmanis, Gundars Muiznieks, Valdis Muižnieks, Juris Kalniņš, Oļģerts Hehts, Alvils Gulbis, Aivars Leonciks, Janis Davids, Ivars Veritis, Andrejs Bergs (Head Coach: Alexander Gomelsky)

== 1961–62 ==
FIBA European Champions Cup

Winner: Dinamo Tbilisi (USSR) Guram Minashvili, Valeri Altabaev, Aleksandre Kiladze, Vladimer Ugrekhelidze, Levan Intskirveli, Anzor Lezhava, Aleksandr Petrov, Ilarion Khazaradze, Levan Moseshvili, Revaz Gogelia, Amiran Skhiereli, Anton Kazandjian (Head Coach: Otar Korkia)

Runner-up: Real Madrid (Spain) Emiliano Rodríguez, Wayne Hightower, Lolo Sainz, Stan Morrison, Carlos Sevillano, Jose Lluis, Julio Descartin, Lorenzo Alocén, José Ramón Durand, Antonio Palmero, Pedro Llop, Kent McComb (Head Coach: Pedro Ferrándiz)

== 1962–63 ==
FIBA European Champions Cup

Winner: CSKA Moscow (USSR) Gennadi Volnov, Viktor Zubkov, Armenak Alachachian, Jaak Lipso, Yuri Korneev, Aleksandr Petrov, Alexander Travin, Arkadi Bochkarev, Anatoli Astakhov, Viacheslav Khrinin, Mikhail Semyonov, Alexander Kulkov, Alexander Shatalin (Head Coach: Evgeny Alekseev)

Runner-up: Real Madrid (Spain) Emiliano Rodríguez, Clifford Luyk, Lolo Sainz, Bob Burgess, Carlos Sevillano, José Ramón Durand, Lorenzo Alocén, Julio Descartin, Antonio Palmero, Jorge García, Arsenio Lope (Head Coach: Joaquín Hernández)

== 1963–64 ==
FIBA European Champions Cup

Winner: Real Madrid (Spain) Emiliano Rodríguez, Clifford Luyk, Bob Burgess, Bill Hanson, Lolo Sainz, Carlos Sevillano, José Ramón Durand, Julio Descartin, Moncho Monsalve, Antonio Palmero, Ignacio San Martin (Head Coach: Joaquín Hernández)

Runner-up: Spartak ZJŠ Brno (Czechoslovakia) František Konvička, Vladimír Pištělák, Zdeněk Bobrovský, Jan Bobrovský, Zdeněk Konečný, František Pokorný, Zdenek Vlk, Stanislav Milota, Tomas Jambor, Ivo Dubs, Martin Nuchalik, Cvrkal (Head Coach: Ivo Mrázek)

== 1964–65 ==
FIBA European Champions Cup

Winner: Real Madrid (Spain) Emiliano Rodríguez, Clifford Luyk, Bob Burgess, Lolo Sainz, Jim Scott, Carlos Sevillano, Julio Descartin, José Ramón Durand, Moncho Monsalve, Miguel "Che" Gonzalez, Fernando Modrego, Jorge García (Head Coach: Pedro Ferrándiz)

Runner-up: CSKA Moscow (USSR) Gennadi Volnov, Viktor Zubkov, Armenak Alachachian, Jaak Lipso, Yuri Korneev, Anatoli Astakhov, Alexander Travin, Oleg Borodin, Alexander Kulkov, Gennadi Chechuro, Arkadi Bochkarev, Vadim Kapranov, I.Brjanov (Head Coach: Evgeny Alekseev)

== 1965–66 ==
FIBA European Champions Cup

Winner: Simmenthal Milano (Italy) Bill Bradley, Skip Thoren, Sandro Riminucci, Gabriele Vianello, Massimo Masini, Gianfranco Pieri, Giulio Iellini, Giandomenico Ongaro, Franco Longhi, Marco Binda, Luciano Gnocchi, Fenelli (Head Coach: Cesare Rubini)

Runner-up: Slavia VŠ Praha (Czechoslovakia) Jiří Zídek Sr., Jiří Zedníček, Karel Baroch, Jiri Ammer, Jaroslav Kovar, Jaroslav Krivy, Jirí Štastný, Jiri Lizalek, Jiří Konopásek, Josef Kraus, Vladimír Knop, Jan Blažek, Miloš Hrádek, Jan Hummel (Head Coach: Jaroslav Šíp)

== 1966–67 ==
FIBA European Champions Cup

Winner: Real Madrid (Spain) Emiliano Rodríguez, Clifford Luyk, Miles Aiken, Lolo Sainz, Bob McIntyre, Carlos Sevillano, Moncho Monsalve, Vicente Paniagua, José Ramón Ramos, Cristóbal Rodríguez, Toncho Nava, Ramón Guardiola (Head Coach: Pedro Ferrándiz)

Runner-up: Simmenthal Milano (Italy) Steve Chubin, Austin "Red" Robbins, Sandro Riminucci, Massimo Masini, Gabriele Vianello, Gianfranco Pieri, Giulio Iellini, Giandomenico Ongaro, Gianfranco Fantin, Franco Longhi, Marco Binda, Luciano Gnocchi (Head Coach: Cesare Rubini)

== 1967–68 ==
FIBA European Champions Cup

Winner: Real Madrid (Spain) Emiliano Rodríguez, Clifford Luyk, Wayne Brabender, Miles Aiken, Lolo Sainz, Vicente Paniagua, Toncho Nava, Carlos Sevillano, José Ramón Ramos, Cristóbal Rodríguez, Ramón Guardiola (Head Coach: Pedro Ferrándiz)

Runner-up: Spartak ZJŠ Brno (Czechoslovakia) František Konvička, Vladimír Pištělák, Jan Bobrovský, Zdeněk Bobrovský, Petr Novický, Zdenek Vlk, Tomas Jambor, Jiri Pospisil, Jiri Kovarik, Miroslav Bily, Miroslav Zanaska, Cvrkal (Head Coach: Ivo Mrázek)

== 1968–69 ==
FIBA European Champions Cup

Winner: CSKA Moscow (USSR) Sergei Belov, Vladimir Andreev, Gennadi Volnov, Jaak Lipso, Alexander Sidjakin, Vadim Kapranov, Yuri Selikhov, Alexander Kulkov, Anatoli Astakhov, Oleg Borodin, Rudolf Nesterov, Nikolai Kovirkin, Nikolai Kruchkov, Anatoli Blik (Head Coach: Armenak Alachachian)

Runner-up: Real Madrid (Spain) Emiliano Rodríguez, Clifford Luyk, Wayne Brabender, Miles Aiken, Vicente Ramos, Lolo Sainz, José Ramón Ramos, Toncho Nava, Cristóbal Rodríguez, Carlos Sevillano, Vicente Paniagua, Ramón Guardiola, Rafael Rullán, Carmelo Cabrera, Jose Manuel Suero, Cesar Perera, Alberto Vinas (Head Coach: Pedro Ferrándiz)

== 1969–70 ==
FIBA European Champions Cup

Winner: Ignis Varese (Italy) Dino Meneghin, Ricky Jones, Manolo Raga, Aldo Ossola, Edoardo Rusconi, Paolo Vittori, Ottorino Flaborea, Toto Bulgheroni, Lino Paschini, Massimo Villetti, Claudio Malagoli, Giorgio Consonni (Head Coach: Aca Nikolić)

Runner-up: CSKA Moscow (USSR) Sergei Belov, Vladimir Andreev, Alzhan Zharmukhamedov, Alexander Sidjakin, Vadim Kapranov, Valeri Miloserdov, Yuri Selikhov, Alexander Kulkov, Anatoli Blik, Nikolai Kovirkin, Vladimir Iljuk, Nikolai Kruchkov, Nikolai Gilgner, Mikhail Medvedev (Head Coach: Armenak Alachachian)

== 1970–71 ==
FIBA European Champions Cup

Winner: CSKA Moscow (USSR) Sergei Belov, Vladimir Andreev, Alzhan Zharmukhamedov, Ivan Edeshko, Vadim Kapranov, Alexander Kulkov, Evgeni Kovalenko, Nikolai Kovirkin, Vladimir Iljuk, Nikolai Gilgner, Yuri Selikhov, Rudolf Nesterov, Valeri Miloserdov, Nikolai Kruchkov, Boris Subbotin, Sergei Yastrebov, Vladimir Zakharov, Nikolai Bolvachev (Head Coach: Alexander Gomelsky)

Runner-up: Ignis Varese (Italy) Dino Meneghin, John Fultz, Aldo Ossola, Manolo Raga, Ottorino Flaborea, Edoardo Rusconi, Paolo Vittori, Ivan Bisson, Paolo Polzot, Toto Bulgheroni, Augusto d'Amico, Massimo Villetti, Lino Paschini, Giovanni Gavagnin, Giorgio Consonni (Head Coach: Aca Nikolić)

== 1971–72 ==
FIBA European Champions Cup

Winner: Ignis Varese (Italy) Dino Meneghin, Manolo Raga, Aldo Ossola, Tony Gennari, Ottorino Flaborea, Edoardo Rusconi, Paolo Vittori, Ivan Bisson, Marino Zanatta, Graziano Malachin, Walter Vigna (Head Coach: Aca Nikolić)

Runner-up: Jugoplastika (Yugoslavia) Petar Skansi, Damir Šolman, Rato Tvrdić, Mihajlo Manović, Zdenko Prug, Branko Macura, Lovre Tvrdić, Dražen Tvrdić, Duje Krstulović, Mirko Grgin, Drago Peterka, Ivo Škarić, Zoran Grašo (Head Coach: Branko Radović)

== 1972–73 ==
FIBA European Champions Cup

Winner: Ignis Varese (Italy) Dino Meneghin, Bob Morse, Manolo Raga, Aldo Ossola, Ivan Bisson, Ottorino Flaborea, Marino Zanatta, Edoardo Rusconi, Paolo Polzot, Paolo Vittori, Massimo Lucarelli, Giorgio Chiarini, Franco Bartolucci (Head Coach: Aca Nikolić)

Runner-up: CSKA Moscow (USSR) Sergei Belov, Vladimir Andreev, Ivan Edeshko, Alzhan Zharmukhamedov, Evgeni Kovalenko, Viktor Petrakov, Alexander Kulkov, Valeri Miloserdov, Nikolai Djachenko, Nikolai Kovirkin, Vadim Kapranov, Vladimir Iljuk, Sergei Yastrebov, Vladimir Viktorov (Head Coach: Alexander Gomelsky)

== 1973–74 ==
FIBA European Champions Cup

Winner: Real Madrid (Spain) Juan Antonio Corbalán, Clifford Luyk, Wayne Brabender, Walter Szczerbiak Sr., Rafael Rullán, Vicente Ramos, Carmelo Cabrera, Cristóbal Rodríguez, Vicente Paniagua, Luis Maria Prada (Head Coach: Pedro Ferrándiz)

Runner-up: Ignis Varese (Italy) Dino Meneghin, Bob Morse, Manolo Raga, Aldo Ossola, Ivan Bisson, Edoardo Rusconi, Marino Zanatta, Paolo Polzot, Massimo Lucarelli, Sergio Rizzi, Mauro Salvaneschi, Maurizio Gualco (Head Coach: Sandro Gamba)

== 1974–75 ==
FIBA European Champions Cup

Winner: Ignis Varese (Italy) Bob Morse, Charlie Yelverton, Dino Meneghin, Aldo Ossola, Ivan Bisson, Marino Zanatta, Edoardo Rusconi, Sergio Rizzi, Mauro Salvaneschi, Enzo Carraria, Maurizio Gualco, Bessi, Lepori (Head Coach: Sandro Gamba)

Runner-up: Real Madrid (Spain) Juan Antonio Corbalán, Clifford Luyk, Wayne Brabender, Walter Szczerbiak Sr., Rafael Rullán, Carmelo Cabrera, Vicente Ramos, Cristóbal Rodríguez, Luis Maria Prada, Vicente Paniagua, Samuel Puente, José Manuel Beirán (Head Coach: Pedro Ferrándiz)

== 1975–76 ==
FIBA European Champions Cup

Winner: Mobilgirgi Varese (Italy) Dino Meneghin, Bob Morse, Bill Campion, Aldo Ossola, Giulio Iellini, Marino Zanatta, Ivan Bisson, Mauro Salvaneschi, Sergio Rizzi, Maurizio Gualco, Enzo Carraria, Stefano Bechini, Alberto Mottini, Riccardo Montesi (Head Coach: Sandro Gamba)

Runner-up: Real Madrid (Spain) Juan Antonio Corbalán, Clifford Luyk, Wayne Brabender, Walter Szczerbiak Sr., John Coughran, Rafael Rullán, Vicente Ramos, Carmelo Cabrera, Cristóbal Rodríguez, Luis Maria Prada, Vicente Paniagua, Julio Jimenez, José Luis Logroño (Head Coach: Lolo Sainz)

== 1976–77 ==
FIBA European Champions Cup

Winner: Maccabi Tel Aviv (Israel) Miki Berkovich, Jim Boatwright, Lou Silver, Aulcie Perry, Tal Brody, Motti Aroesti, Shuki Schwartz, Bob Griffin, Eric Menkin, Eyal Yaffe, Hanan Indibo, Eran Arad (Head Coach: Ralph Klein)

Runner-up: Mobilgirgi Varese (Italy) Dino Meneghin, Bob Morse, Aldo Ossola, Randy Meister, Ivan Bisson, Giulio Iellini, Marino Zanatta, Sergio Rizzi, Stefano Bechini, Antonio Campiglio, Alberto Mottini, Fabio Colombo, Marco Dellacà, Enzo Pozzati, Rich Rinaldi, Daniele Bellini (Head Coach: Sandro Gamba)

== 1977–78 ==
FIBA European Champions Cup

Winner: Real Madrid (Spain) Juan Antonio Corbalán, Wayne Brabender, Walter Szczerbiak Sr., John Coughran, Clifford Luyk, Rafael Rullán, Carmelo Cabrera, Juan Manuel López Iturriaga, Luis Maria Prada, Vicente Ramos, Fernando Romay, Cristóbal Rodríguez, Samuel Puente, Joseba Gaztañaga (Head Coach: Lolo Sainz)

Runner-up: Mobilgirgi Varese (Italy) Dino Meneghin, Bob Morse, Charlie Yelverton, Aldo Ossola, Marino Zanatta, Ivan Bisson, Edoardo Rusconi, Stefano Bechini, Antonio Campiglio, Riccardo Caneva, Fabio Colombo, Marco Dellaca, Carlo Rossetti, Enzo Pozzati, Diego Tosarini (Head Coach: Nicola "Nico" Messina)

== 1978–79 ==
FIBA European Champions Cup

Winner: Bosna (Yugoslavia) Mirza Delibašić, Žarko Varajić, Svetislav Pešić, Sabahudin Bilalović, Sabit Hadžić, Predrag Benaček, Ratko Radovanović, Bosko Bosiočić, Ante Đogić, Nihad Izić, Dragan Zrno, Boro Vučević, Almir Dervišbegović, Sulejman Duraković (Head Coach: Bogdan Tanjević)

Runner-up: Emerson Varese (Italy) Dino Meneghin, Bob Morse, Charlie Yelverton, Aldo Ossola, Giuseppe Gergati, Maurizio Gualco, Fabio Colombo, Marco Dellaca, Enzo Carraria, Edoardo Rusconi, Riccardo Caneva, Diego Tosarini, Reschini Buzzi (Head Coach: Edoardo Rusconi)

== 1979–80 ==
FIBA European Champions Cup

Winner: Real Madrid (Spain) Juan Antonio Corbalán, Wayne Brabender, Walter Szczerbiak Sr., Randy Meister, Rafael Rullán, Luis Maria Prada, José Manuel Beirán, José Luis Llorente, Josean Querejeta, Juan Manuel López Iturriaga, Fernando Romay, Fede Ramiro (Head Coach: Lolo Sainz)

Runner-up: Maccabi Tel Aviv (Israel) Aulcie Perry, Miki Berkovich, Earl Williams, Jim Boatwright, Lou Silver, Motti Aroesti, Shmuel Zysman, Hanan Keren, Shuki Schwartz, Hanan Dobrish, Amnon Garah, Moshe Shabtay (Head Coach: Ralph Klein)

== 1980–81 ==
FIBA European Champions Cup

Winner: Maccabi Tel Aviv (Israel) Aulcie Perry, Miki Berkovich, Jim Boatwright, Lou Silver, Earl Williams, Motti Aroesti, Shuki Schwartz, Shmuel Zysman, Moshe Hershkowitz, Hanan Keren, Hanan Dobrish, Amnon Garah (Head Coach: Rudy D'Amico)

Runner-up: Sinudyne Bologna (Italy) Marco Bonamico, Jim McMillan, Marcos Leite "Marquinhos", Renato Villalta, Piero Valenti, Carlo Caglieris, Pietro Generali, Francesco Cantamessi, Mario Martini, Mario Porto, Marco Tirel, Ferdinando Possemato, Gus Binelli, Augusto Conti (Head Coach: Ettore Zuccheri / Renzo Ranuzzi / Aca Nikolić)

== 1981–82 ==
FIBA European Champions Cup

Winner: Squibb Cantù (Italy) Pierlo Marzorati, Antonello Riva, Bruce Flowers, Charles Kupec, Denis Innocentin, Giorgio Cattini, Fausto Bargna, Renzo Bariviera, Umberto Cappelletti, Eugenio Masolo, Antonio Sala, Giuseppe Bosa, Valerio Fumagalli, Marco Martin (Head Coach: Valerio Bianchini)

Runner-up: Maccabi Tel Aviv (Israel) Aulcie Perry, Miki Berkovich, Lou Silver, Earl Williams, Motti Aroesti, Jack Zimmerman, Howard Lassof, Hanan Keren, Moshe Hershkowitz, Haim Markowitz, Itamar Stern, Baruch Smoler, Yuval Ben-Mordechai, Dror Tzeplovitz (Head Coach: Ralph Klein)

== 1982–83 ==
FIBA European Champions Cup

Winner: Ford Cantù (Italy) Antonello Riva, Pierlo Marzorati, Wallace Bryant, Jim Brewer, Renzo Bariviera, Giuseppe Bosa, Giorgio Cattini, Denis Innocentin, Fausto Bargna, Corrado Fumagalli, Antonio Sala (Head Coach: Giancarlo Primo)

Runner-up: Billy Milano (Italy) Mike D'Antoni, Dino Meneghin, Roberto Premier, John Gianelli, Dino Boselli, Vittorio Gallinari, Vittorio Ferracini, Franco Boselli, Marco Rossi, Pierpaolo del Buono, Rinaldo Innocenti, Vincenzo Sciacca, Marco Baldi (Head Coach: Dan Peterson)

== 1983–84 ==
FIBA European Champions Cup

Winner: Banco di Roma Virtus (Italy) Larry Wright, Clarence Kea, Enrico Gilardi, Marco Solfrini, Fulvio Polesello, Stefano Sbarra, Renzo Tombolato, Gianni Bertolotti, Paolo Salvaggi, Tullio Sacripanti, Giuseppe Grimaldi, Paolo Scarnati, Darrell Lockhart, Roberto Paliani (Head Coach: Valerio Bianchini)

Runner-up: FC Barcelona (Spain) Juan Antonio San Epifanio, Chicho Sibilio, Nacho Solozabal, Mike Davis, Marcellus Starks, Luis Miguel Santillana, Juan Domingo de la Cruz, Pedro Cesar Ansa, Arturo Seara, Jordi Darde, Manuel "Manolo" Flores, Rafael Vecina (Head Coach: Antoni Serra)

== 1984–85 ==
FIBA European Champions Cup

Winner: Cibona (Yugoslavia) Dražen Petrović, Aca Petrović, Andro Knego, Zoran Čutura, Mihovil Nakić, Sven Ušić, Branko Vukićević, Adnan Bečić, Franjo Arapović, Ivo Nakić, Igor Lukačić, Dražen Anzulović, Nebojša Razić, Ivan Šoštarec (Head Coach: Željko Pavličević / Mirko Novosel)

Runner-up: Real Madrid (Spain) Juan Antonio Corbalán, Wayne Robinson, Brian Jackson, Fernando Martín, Juan Manuel López Iturriaga, Fernando Romay, Rafael Rullán, Antonio Martín, Paco Velasco, Alfonso del Corral, José Biriukov (Head Coach: Lolo Sainz)

== 1985–86 ==
FIBA European Champions Cup

Winner: Cibona (Yugoslavia) Dražen Petrović, Danko Cvjetićanin, Zoran Čutura, Mihovil Nakić, Franjo Arapović, Sven Ušić, Branko Vukićević, Damir Pavličević, Adnan Bečić, Ivo Nakić, Ivan Šoštarec, Dražen Anzulović, Nebojša Razić (Head Coach: Željko Pavličević)

Runner-up: Žalgiris (USSR) Arvydas Sabonis, Valdemaras Chomičius, Rimas Kurtinaitis, Sergejus Jovaiša, Algirdas Brazys, Arūnas Visockas, Gintaras Krapikas, Raimundas Čivilis, Mindaugas Lekarauskas, Virginijus Jankauskas, Robertas Ragauskas, Vytautas Maleras (Head Coach: Vladas Garastas)

== 1986–87 ==
FIBA European Champions Cup

Winner: Tracer Milano (Italy) Bob McAdoo, Mike D'Antoni, Dino Meneghin, Ken Barlow, Roberto Premier, Fausto Bargna, Franco Boselli, Riccardo Pittis, Vittorio Gallinari, Mario Governa, Michele Guardascione, Fabrizio Ambrassa (Head Coach: Dan Peterson)

Runner-up: Maccabi Tel Aviv (Israel) Kevin Magee, Lee Johnson, Doron Jamchi, Miki Berkovich, Motti Aroesti, Hen Lippin, Howard Lassof, Greg Cornelius, Ido Steinberger, Meir Kaminski, Avi Schiller, Lior Arditi (Head Coach: Zvi Sherf)

== 1987–88 ==
FIBA European Champions Cup

Winner: Tracer Milano (Italy) Bob McAdoo, Mike D'Antoni, Rickey Brown, Dino Meneghin, Roberto Premier, Riccardo Pittis, Piero Montecchi, Massimiliano Aldi, Fausto Bargna, Mario Governa, Fabrizio Ambrassa, Alessandro Chiodini (Head Coach: Franco Casalini)

Runner-up: Maccabi Tel Aviv (Israel) Kevin Magee, Ken Barlow, Willie Sims, Doron Jamchi, Miki Berkovich, Motti Aroesti, Motti Daniel, Hen Lippin, Itzhak Cohen, Gilad Katz, Greg Cornelius (Head Coach: Ralph Klein)

== 1988–89 ==
FIBA European Champions Cup

Winner: Jugoplastika (Yugoslavia) Toni Kukoč, Dino Rađja, Duško Ivanović, Velimir Perasović, Goran Sobin, Zoran Sretenović, Žan Tabak, Luka Pavićević, Teo Čizmić, Ivica Burić, Paško Tomić, Petar Vučica (Head Coach: Božidar Maljković)

Runner-up: Maccabi Tel Aviv (Israel) Kevin Magee, Ken Barlow, Willie Sims, Doron Jamchi, LaVon Mercer, Hen Lippin, Motti Daniel, Itzhak Cohen, Gilad Katz, Eliezer Gordon, Uri Buch, Eran Bergstein (Head Coach: Zvi Sherf)

== 1989–90 ==
FIBA European Champions Cup

Winner: Jugoplastika (Yugoslavia) Toni Kukoč, Dino Rađja, Zoran Savić, Velimir Perasović, Duško Ivanović, Zoran Sretenović, Goran Sobin, Žan Tabak, Luka Pavićević, Aramis Naglić, Petar Naumoski, Velibor Radović, Josip Lovrić, Teo Čizmić, Paško Tomić (Head Coach: Božidar Maljković)

Runner-up: FC Barcelona (Spain) Juan Antonio San Epifanio, Audie Norris, David Wood, Nacho Solozabal, Andrés Jiménez, Ferran Martínez, Quim Costa, Xavi Crespo, Claudi Martinez, Arturo Llopis, Lisard Gonzalez, Xavier Marin, Paul Thompson, Steve Trumbo, Oscar de la Torre (Head Coach: Aíto García Reneses)

== 1990–91 ==
FIBA European Champions Cup

Winner: Pop 84 (Yugoslavia) Toni Kukoč, Zoran Savić, Avie Lester, Velimir Perasović, Zoran Sretenović, Žan Tabak, Luka Pavićević, Aramis Naglić, Teo Čizmić, Petar Naumoski, Paško Tomić, Velibor Radović (Head Coach: Željko Pavličević)

Runner-up: FC Barcelona (Spain) José "Piculín" Ortiz, Audie Norris, Juan Antonio San Epifanio, Nacho Solozabal, Andrés Jiménez, Jose Antonio Montero, Jose Luis Galilea, Steve Trumbo, Xavi Crespo, Lisard Gonzalez, Roger Esteller, Angel Luis Almeida, Eduardo Bonet, Jose Maria Pedrera, Oscar de la Torre, Daniel Rovira (Head Coach: Božidar Maljković)

== 1991–92 ==
FIBA European League

Winner: Partizan (Yugoslavia) Sasha Danilović, Saša Đorđević, Ivo Nakić, Slaviša Koprivica, Zoran Stevanović, Željko Rebrača, Nikola Lončar, Vladimir Dragutinović, Mlađan Šilobad, Dragiša Šarić, Igor Mihajlovski, Igor Perović (Head Coach: Željko Obradović)

Runner-up: Montigalà Joventut (Spain) Jordi Villacampa, Harold Pressley, Corny Thompson, Jordi Pardo, Rafa Jofresa, Tomás Jofresa, Juan Antonio Morales, Ferran Martínez, Carles Ruf, Jordi Llorens, Alfonso Albert (Head Coach: Lolo Sainz)

== 1992–93 ==
FIBA European League

Winner: Limoges CSP (France) Michael Young, Jure Zdovc, Richard Dacoury, Jim Bilba, Willie Redden, Frederic Forte, Franck Butter, Duško Ivanović, Jimmy Verove, Christophe Botton, Marc M'Bahia, Jean-Marc Dupraz (Head Coach: Božidar Maljković)

Runner-up: Benetton Treviso (Italy) Toni Kukoč, Terry Teagle, Stefano Rusconi, Massimo Iacopini, Alberto Vianini, Nino Pellacani, Marco Mian, Maurizio Ragazzi, Germán Scarone, Riccardo Esposito, Davide Piccoli (Head Coach: Petar Skansi)

== 1993–94 ==
FIBA European League

Winner: 7up Joventut (Spain) Jordi Villacampa, Corny Thompson, Ferran Martínez, Mike Smith, Rafa Jofresa, Tomás Jofresa, Juan Antonio Morales, Dani Pérez, Alfonso Albert, Joffre Lleal, Daniel García, Ivan Corrales (Head Coach: Željko Obradović)

Runner-up: Olympiacos (Greece) Žarko Paspalj, Roy Tarpley, Panagiotis Fasoulas, Milan Tomić, Georgios Sigalas, Franko Nakić, Efthimis Bakatsias, Georgios Limniatis, Antonis Stamatis, Argiris Kambouris, Dragan Tarlać, Georgios Papadakos, Panagiotis Karatzas (Head Coach: Ioannis Ioannidis)

== 1994–95 ==
FIBA European League

Winner: Real Madrid (Spain) Arvydas Sabonis, Joe Arlauckas, Antonio Martín, José Miguel Antúnez, Pep Cargol, José Biriukov, Javier Garcia Coll, Ismael Santos, José Lasa, Juan Ignacio Romero, Roberto Núñez, Martin Ferrer, José María Silva (Head Coach: Željko Obradović)

Runner-up: Olympiacos (Greece) Eddie Johnson, Alexander Volkov, Dragan Tarlać, Milan Tomić, Franko Nakić, Georgios Sigalas, Panagiotis Fasoulas, Efthimis Bakatsias, Argiris Kambouris, Georgios Limniatis, Georgios Papadakos, Antonis Stamatis, Charalampos Papadakis (Head Coach: Ioannis Ioannidis)

== 1995–96 ==
FIBA European League

Winner: Panathinaikos (Greece) Dominique Wilkins, Stojko Vranković, Nikos Oikonomou, Panagiotis Giannakis, Fragiskos Alvertis, Miroslav Pecarski, John Korfas, Kostas Patavoukas, Tzanis Stavrakopoulos, Vangelis Vourtzoumis, Christos Myriounis (Head Coach: Božidar Maljković)

Runner-up: FC Barcelona (Spain) Artūras Karnišovas, Dan Godfread, Andrés Jiménez, Ferran Martínez, Xavi Fernández, Jose Antonio Montero, Manel Bosch, Jose Luis Galilea, Salva Díez, Quique Andreu, Roberto Dueñas, Oriol Junyent (Head Coach: Aíto García Reneses)

== 1996–97 ==
FIBA EuroLeague

Winner: Olympiacos (Greece) David Rivers, Dragan Tarlać, Panagiotis Fasoulas, Milan Tomić, Franko Nakić, Chris Welp, Willie Anderson, Georgios Sigalas, Nasos Galakteros, Efthimis Bakatsias, Dimitrios Papanikolaou, Anatoly Zourpenko, Aleksey Savrasenko (Head Coach: Dušan Ivković)

Runner-up: FC Barcelona (Spain) Artūras Karnišovas, Sašha Đjorđjević, Ramón Rivas, Andrés Jiménez, Xavi Fernández, Andrei Fetisov, Rafa Jofresa, Roger Esteller, Roberto Dueñas, Quique Andreu, Manel Bosch, Salva Díez, Jose Antonio Montero, Victor Alemany (Head Coach: Aíto García Reneses)

== 1997–98 ==
FIBA EuroLeague

Winner: Kinder Bologna (Italy) Sasha Danilović, Zoran Savić, Antoine Rigaudeau, Alessandro Abbio, Hugo Sconochini, Rašho Nesterović, Alessandro Frosini, Gus Binelli, John Amaechi, Riccardo Morandotti, Claudio Crippa, Fabio Ruini, Enrico Ravaglia, Tomas Ress, Davide Gonzo (Head Coach: Ettore Messina)

Runner-up: AEK (Greece) Victor Alexander, Bane Prelević, Willie Anderson, Nikos Chatzis, Michael Andersen, José Lasa, Claudio Coldebella, Michalis Kakiouzis, Mikkel Larsen, Jake Tsakalidis, Ramón Rivas, Ricky Pierce, Terence Stansbury, Makis Nikolaidis, Christos Lingos, Panagiotis Barlas, Dimitris Papadopoulos (Head Coach: Ioannis Ioannidis)

== 1998–99 ==
FIBA EuroLeague

Winner: Žalgiris (Lithuania) Tyus Edney, Anthony Bowie, Saulius Štombergas, Jiří Zídek, Dainius Adomaitis, Mindaugas Žukauskas, Eurelijus Žukauskas, Tomas Masiulis, Darius Maskoliūnas, Kęstutis Šeštokas (Head Coach: Jonas Kazlauskas)

Runner-up: Kinder Bologna (Italy) Sasha Danilović, Antoine Rigaudeau, Rašho Nesterović, Alessandro Abbio, Hugo Sconochini, Alessandro Frosini, Dan O'Sullivan, Gus Binelli, Žarko Paspalj, Claudio Crippa, Michael Olowokandi, Matteo Panichi, Fabio Ruini (Head Coach: Ettore Messina)

== 1999–2000 ==
FIBA EuroLeague

Winner: Panathinaikos (Greece) Dejan Bodiroga, Željko Rebrača, Oded Kattash, Johnny Rogers, Antonis Fotsis, Fragiskos Alvertis, Pat Burke, Michael Koch, Nando Gentile, Nikos Boudouris, Georgios Kalaitzis, Kostas Maglos, Georgios Karagkoutis (Head Coach: Željko Obradović)

Runner-up: Maccabi Tel Aviv (Israel) Nate Huffman, Ariel McDonald, Doron Sheffer, Dallas Comegys, Nadav Henefeld, Gur Shelef, Mark Brisker, Derrick Sharp, Doron Jamchi, Constantin Popa (Head Coach: Pini Gershon)

== 2000–01 ==
† The 2000–01 season was a transition year, with the best European teams splitting into two different major leagues: The SuproLeague, held by FIBA Europe, and the Euroleague, held by Euroleague Basketball Company.

Euroleague (Euroleague Basketball competition)

Winner: Kinder Bologna (Italy) Manu Ginóbili, Antoine Rigaudeau, Rashard Griffith, Marko Jarić, Matjaž Smodiš, Alessandro Frosini, Alessandro Abbio, David Andersen, Davide Bonora, Nikola Jestratijević, Fabrizio Ambrassa, Hugo Sconochini, David Brkić, Gianluca Ghedini, Cristian Akrivos (Head Coach: Ettore Messina)

Runner-up: TAU Cerámica (Spain) Victor Alexander, Elmer Bennett, Saulius Štombergas, Fabricio Oberto, Luis Scola, Laurent Foirest, Mindaugas Timinskas, Chris Corchiani, Sergi Vidal, Dani García (Head Coach: Duško Ivanović)

FIBA SuproLeague (FIBA Europe competition)

Winner: Maccabi Tel Aviv (Israel) Nate Huffman, Anthony Parker, Ariel McDonald, Nadav Henefeld, Derrick Sharp, Radisav Ćurčić, Gur Shelef, Tal Burstein, Mark Brisker, Velibor Radović, David Sternlight, Elad Savion (Head Coach: Pini Gershon)

Runner-up: Panathinaikos (Greece) Dejan Bodiroga, Željko Rebrača, Johnny Rogers, Darryl Middleton, Antonis Fotsis, Fragiskos Alvertis, Pat Burke, Michael Koch, Nando Gentile, Georgios Kalaitzis, George Ballogiannis, Ioannis Rodostoglou, Andreas Glyniadakis, Ioannis Voulgaris (Head Coach: Željko Obradović)

== 2001–02 ==
Euroleague

Winner: Panathinaikos (Greece) Dejan Bodiroga, İbrahim Kutluay, Damir Mulaomerović, Darryl Middleton, Fragiskos Alvertis, Lazaros Papadopoulos, Pepe Sánchez, Johnny Rogers, Corey Albano, İoannis Giannoulis, Georgios Kalaitzis, Ioannis Sioutis, George Ballogiannis (Head Coach: Željko Obradović)

Runner-up: Kinder Bologna (Italy) Manu Ginóbili, Antoine Rigaudeau, Marko Jarić, Rashard Griffith, Matjaž Smodiš, David Andersen, Alessandro Frosini, Alessandro Abbio, Sani Bečirovič, Davide Bonora, David Brkić, Paolo Barlera, Antonio Granger, Carlo Ferri, Cristian Akrivos, Roberto Graziano (Head Coach: Ettore Messina)

== 2002–03 ==
Euroleague

Winner: FC Barcelona (Spain) Šarūnas Jasikevičius, Dejan Bodiroga, Gregor Fučka, Roberto Dueñas, Juan Carlos Navarro, Patrick Femerling, Rodrigo De la Fuente, Anderson Varejão, Ignacio Rodríguez, Cesar Bravo, Alfons Alzamora, Remon van de Hare (Head Coach: Svetislav Pešić)

Runner-up: Benetton Treviso (Italy) Tyus Edney, Trajan Langdon, Jorge Garbajosa, Denis Marconato, Riccardo Pittis, Marcelo Nicola, Massimo Bulleri, Krešimir Lončar, Manu Markoishvili, Nick Eppeheimer, Thomas Soltau, István Németh, Dante Calabria, Mario Stojić, David Steffel (Head Coach: Ettore Messina)

== 2003–04 ==
Euroleague

Winner: Maccabi Tel Aviv (Israel) Šarūnas Jasikevičius, Anthony Parker, Nikola Vujčić, Maceo Baston, Derrick Sharp, Tal Burstein, David Blu, Deon Thomas, Gur Shelef, Yotam Halperin, Bruno Šundov, Yoav Saffar, Avi Ben-Chimol, Anton Kazarnovski (Head Coach: Pini Gershon)

Runner-up: Skipper Bologna (Italy) Miloš Vujanić, Carlos Delfino, Matjaž Smodiš, Gianluca Basile, Hanno Möttölä, Gianmarco Pozzecco, Tomas Van Den Spiegel, Erazem Lorbek, A.J. Guyton, Marco Belinelli, Stefano Mancinelli, Patricio Prato, Robert Fultz (Head Coach: Jasmin Repeša)

== 2004–05 ==
Euroleague

Winner: Maccabi Tel Aviv (Israel) Šarūnas Jasikevičius, Anthony Parker, Nikola Vujčić, Maceo Baston, Deon Thomas, Nestoras Kommatos, Derrick Sharp, Tal Burstein, Yaniv Green, Gur Shelef, Yotam Halperin, Assaf Dotan (Head Coach: Pini Gershon)

Runner-up: TAU Cerámica (Spain) Luis Scola, Arvydas Macijauskas, José Calderón, Travis Hansen, Kornél Dávid, Andrew Betts, Tiago Splitter, Pablo Prigioni, Sergi Vidal, Robert Conley, Roberto Gabini, Omar Quintero (Head Coach: Duško Ivanović)

== 2005–06 ==
Euroleague

Winner: CSKA Moscow (Russia) J.R. Holden, Trajan Langdon, David Vanterpool, Theo Papaloukas, Matjaž Smodiš, David Andersen, Aleksey Savrasenko, Tomas Van Den Spiegel, Sergei Panov, Zakhar Pashutin, Nikita Kurbanov, Vasili Zavoruev, Vladimir Dyachok, Anatoli Kashirov, Nikita Shabalkin (Head Coach: Ettore Messina)

Runner-up: Maccabi Tel Aviv (Israel) Anthony Parker, Nikola Vujčić, Maceo Baston, Will Solomon, Jamie Arnold, Tal Burstein, Derrick Sharp, Kirk Penney, Yaniv Green, Sharon Shason, Assaf Dotan, Omri Casspi (Head Coach: Pini Gershon)

== 2006–07 ==
Euroleague

Winner: Panathinaikos (Greece) Ramūnas Šiškauskas, Dimitris Diamantidis, Mike Batiste, Sani Bečirovič, Miloš Vujanić, Tony Delk, Dejan Tomašević, Robertas Javtokas, Kostas Tsartsaris, Dimos Dikoudis, Nikos Chatzivrettas, Fragiskos Alvertis, Dušan Šakota, Dimitrios Papanikolaou, Vassilis Xanthopoulos (Head Coach: Željko Obradović)

Runner-up: CSKA Moscow (Russia) J.R. Holden, Trajan Langdon, Theo Papaloukas, Matjaž Smodiš, David Andersen, Óscar Torres, David Vanterpool, Tomas Van Den Spiegel, Aleksey Savrasenko, Zakhar Pashutin, Anton Ponkrashov, Nikita Kurbanov, Andrey Vorontsevich, Anatoli Kashirov, Alexey Shved (Head Coach: Ettore Messina)

== 2007–08 ==
Euroleague

Winner: CSKA Moscow (Russia) J.R. Holden, Trajan Langdon, Ramūnas Šiškauskas, Theo Papaloukas, David Andersen, Marcus Gorée, Matjaž Smodiš, Nikos Zisis, Victor Khryapa, Tomas Van Den Spiegel, Aleksey Savrasenko, Zakhar Pashutin, Andrey Vorontsevich, Anatoli Kashirov, Alexey Shved, Artem Zabelin, Nikita Kurbanov (Head Coach: Ettore Messina)

Runner-up: Maccabi Tel Aviv (Israel) Will Bynum, Terence Morris, Vonteego Cummings, Nikola Vujčić, Yotam Halperin, Marcus Fizer, David Blu, Esteban Batista, Omri Casspi, Alex Garcia, Lior Eliyahu, Derrick Sharp, Tal Burstein (Head Coach: Zvi Sherf)

== 2008–09 ==
Euroleague

Winner: Panathinaikos (Greece) Šarūnas Jasikevičius, Dimitris Diamantidis, Vassilis Spanoulis, Mike Batiste, Nikola Peković, Drew Nicholas, Antonis Fotsis, Dušan Kecman, Kostas Tsartsaris, Stratos Perperoglou, Nikos Chatzivrettas, Dušan Šakota, Fragiskos Alvertis, Giorgi Shermadini (Head Coach: Željko Obradović)

Runner-up: CSKA Moscow (Russia) J. R. Holden, Trajan Langdon, Ramūnas Šiškauskas, Terence Morris, Matjaž Smodiš, Zoran Planinić, Erazem Lorbek, Nikos Zisis, Victor Khryapa, Sasha Kaun, Aleksey Savrasenko, Andrey Vorontsevich, Victor Keyru, Alexey Shved (Head Coach: Ettore Messina)

== 2009–10 ==
Euroleague

Winner: Regal FC Barcelona (Spain) Juan Carlos Navarro, Ricky Rubio, Terence Morris, Jaka Lakovič, Pete Mickeal, Fran Vázquez, Boniface N'Dong, Erazem Lorbek, Gianluca Basile, Roger Grimau, Víctor Sada, Jordi Trias, Xavi Rabaseda, Luboš Bartoň (Head Coach: Xavi Pascual)

Runner-up: Olympiacos (Greece) Josh Childress, Miloš Teodosić, Theo Papaloukas, Linas Kleiza, Nikola Vujčić, Patrick Beverley, Scoonie Penn, Sofoklis Schortsanitis, Yotam Halperin, Ioannis Bourousis, Panagiotis Vasilopoulos, Loukas Mavrokefalidis, Kostas Papanikolaou, Andreas Glyniadakis, Kostas Sloukas (Head Coach: Panagiotis Giannakis)

== 2010–11 ==
Euroleague

Winner: Panathinaikos (Greece) Dimitris Diamantidis, Mike Batiste, Romain Sato, Drew Nicholas, Nick Calathes, Antonis Fotsis, Milenko Tepić, Aleks Marić, Kostas Tsartsaris, Stratos Perperoglou, Ian Vougioukas, Kostas Kaimakoglou, Fotios Zoumpos, Ioannis Karamalegkos (Head Coach: Željko Obradović)

Runner-up: Maccabi Tel Aviv (Israel) Jeremy Pargo, Chuck Eidson, Sofoklis Schortsanitis, Doron Perkins, Richard Hendrix, Milan Mačvan, David Blu, Lior Eliyahu, Tal Burstein, Guy Pnini, Derrick Sharp, Yaniv Green, Elishay Kadir (Head Coach: David Blatt)

== 2011–12 ==
Euroleague

Winner: Olympiacos (Greece) Vassilis Spanoulis, Joey Dorsey, Acie Law, Kyle Hines, Pero Antić, Marko Kešelj, Georgios Printezis, Kostas Papanikolaou, Vangelis Mantzaris, Lazaros Papadopoulos, Kostas Sloukas, Marty Gecevičius, Michalis Pelekanos, Andreas Glyniadakis, Dimitrios Katsivelis, Panagiotis Vasilopoulos (Head Coach: Dušan Ivković)

Runner-up: CSKA Moscow (Russia) Andrei Kirilenko, Miloš Teodosić, Ramūnas Šiškauskas, Nenad Krstić, Jamont Gordon, Darjuš Lavrinovič, Victor Khryapa, Alexey Shved, Sasha Kaun, Andrey Vorontsevich, Evgeny Voronov, Anton Ponkrashov, Nikita Kurbanov, Sammy Mejía, Dmitri Sokolov (Head Coach: Jonas Kazlauskas)

== 2012–13 ==
Euroleague

Winner: Olympiacos (Greece) Vassilis Spanoulis, Kyle Hines, Acie Law, Pero Antić, Josh Powell, Giorgi Shermadini, Kostas Papanikolaou, Georgios Printezis, Vangelis Mantzaris, Kostas Sloukas, Stratos Perperoglou, Marty Gecevičius, Dimitrios Mavroeidis, Dimitrios Katsivelis, Doron Perkins (Head Coach: Georgios Bartzokas)

Runner-up: Real Madrid (Spain) Rudy Fernández, Jaycee Carroll, Mirza Begić, Nikola Mirotić, Sergio Llull, Sergio Rodríguez, Carlos Suárez, Dontaye Draper, Marcus Slaughter, Marty Pocius, Felipe Reyes, Rafael Hettsheimeir, Willy Hernangómez (Head Coach: Pablo Laso)

== 2013–14 ==
Euroleague

Winner: Maccabi Tel Aviv (Israel) Ricky Hickman, Tyrese Rice, Devin Smith, Alex Tyus, David Blu, Sofoklis Schortsanitis, Joe Ingles, Andrija Žižić, Shawn James, Yogev Ohayon, Guy Pnini, Sylven Landesberg, Ben Altit, Arad Harari (Head Coach: David Blatt)

Runner-up: Real Madrid (Spain) Rudy Fernández, Sergio Rodríguez, Nikola Mirotić, Tremmell Darden, Ioannis Bourousis, Jaycee Carroll, Sergio Llull, Marcus Slaughter, Felipe Reyes, Salah Mejri, Dontaye Draper, Dani Díez, Alberto Martín, Jonathan Barreiro (Head Coach: Pablo Laso)

== 2014–15 ==
Euroleague

Winner: Real Madrid (Spain) Rudy Fernández, Sergio Rodríguez, Sergio Llull, Andrés Nocioni, Jaycee Carroll, Felipe Reyes, Gustavo Ayón, K. C. Rivers, Jonas Mačiulis, Ioannis Bourousis, Marcus Slaughter, Salah Mejri, Facundo Campazzo (Head Coach: Pablo Laso)

Runner-up: Olympiacos (Greece) Vassilis Spanoulis, Bryant Dunston, Georgios Printezis, Matt Lojeski, Othello Hunter, Tremmell Darden, Oliver Lafayette, Brent Petway, Vangelis Mantzaris, Kostas Sloukas, Dimitrios Agravanis, Ioannis Papapetrou, Dimitrios Katsivelis, Vassilis Kavvadas, Michalis Tsairelis, Antreas Christodoulou (Head Coach: Ioannis Sfairopoulos)

== 2015–16 ==
Euroleague

Winner: CSKA Moscow (Russia) Nando de Colo, Joel Freeland, Vitaly Fridzon, Cory Higgins, Kyle Hines, Aaron Jackson, Victor Khryapa, Pavel Korobkov, Dmitry Kulagin, Mikhail Kulagin, Nikita Kurbanov, Ivan Lazarev, Demetris Nichols, Miloš Teodosić, Andrey Vorontsevich (Head Coach: Dimitrios Itoudis)

Runner-up: Fenerbahçe (Turkey) Pero Antić, Egehan Arna, Ercan Bayrak, Bogdan Bogdanović, Luigi Datome, Bobby Dixon (Ali Muhammed), Barış Hersek, Ricky Hickman, Nikola Kalinić, Melih Mahmutoğlu, Kostas Sloukas, Ekpe Udoh, Berk Uğurlu, Jan Veselý (Head Coach: Željko Obradović)

== 2016–17 ==
EuroLeague

Winner: Fenerbahçe (Turkey) Pero Antić, Egehan Arna, Ahmet Can Duran, Anthony Bennett, Ahmet Düverioğlu, Bogdan Bogdanović, Luigi Datome, Bobby Dixon (Ali Muhammed), Barış Hersek, James Nunnally, Nikola Kalinić, Melih Mahmutoğlu, Kostas Sloukas, Ekpe Udoh, Berk Uğurlu, Jan Veselý (Head Coach: Željko Obradović)

Runner-up: Olympiacos (Greece) Vassilis Spanoulis, Daniel Hackett, Georgios Printezis, Matt Lojeski, Dominic Waters, Erick Green, Ioannis Athinaiou, Khem Birch, Vangelis Mantzaris, Kostas Papanikolaou, Dimitrios Agravanis, Ioannis Papapetrou, Paris Maragkos, Nikola Milutinov, Patric Young, Vassilis Toliopoulos (Head Coach: Ioannis Sfairopoulos)

== Title holders ==
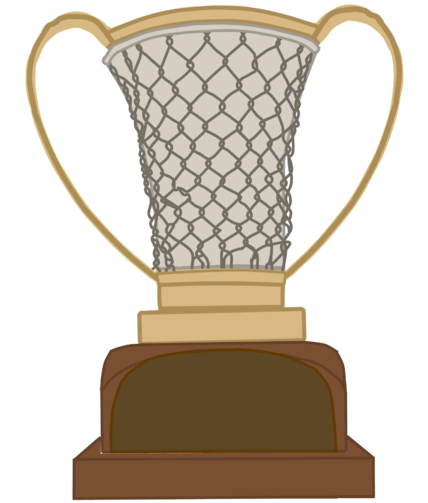

- ......1958 (Soviet Union) Rīgas ASK
- 1958–59 (Soviet Union) Rīgas ASK
- 1959–60 (Soviet Union) Rīgas ASK
- 1960–61 (Soviet Union) CSKA Moscow
- 1961–62 (Soviet Union) Dinamo Tbilisi
- 1962–63 (Soviet Union) CSKA Moscow
- 1963–64 (Spain) Real Madrid
- 1964–65 (Spain) Real Madrid
- 1965–66 (Italy) Olimpia Milano
- 1966–67 (Spain) Real Madrid
- 1967–68 (Spain) Real Madrid
- 1968–69 (Soviet Union) CSKA Moscow
- 1969–70 (Italy) Varese
- 1970–71 (Soviet Union) CSKA Moscow
- 1971–72 (Italy) Varese
- 1972–73 (Italy) Varese
- 1973–74 (Spain) Real Madrid
- 1974–75 (Italy) Varese
- 1975–76 (Italy) Varese
- 1976–77 (Israel) Maccabi Tel Aviv
- 1977–78 (Spain) Real Madrid
- 1978–79 (Socialist Federal Republic of Yugoslavia) Bosna
- 1979–80 (Spain) Real Madrid
- 1980–81 (Israel) Maccabi Tel Aviv
- 1981–82 (Italy) Cantù
- 1982–83 (Italy) Cantù
- 1983–84 (Italy) Virtus Roma
- 1984–85 (Socialist Federal Republic of Yugoslavia) Cibona Zagreb
- 1985–86 (Socialist Federal Republic of Yugoslavia) Cibona Zagreb
- 1986–87 (Italy) Olimpia Milano
- 1987–88 (Italy) Olimpia Milano
- 1988–89 (Socialist Federal Republic of Yugoslavia) Split
- 1989–90 (Socialist Federal Republic of Yugoslavia) Split
- 1990–91 (Socialist Federal Republic of Yugoslavia) Split
- 1991–92 (Federal Republic of Yugoslavia) Partizan Belgrade
- 1992–93 (France) Limoges CSP
- 1993–94 (Spain) Joventut Badalona
- 1994–95 (Spain) Real Madrid
- 1995–96 (Greece) Panathinaikos
- 1996–97 (Greece) Olympiacos
- 1997–98 (Italy) Virtus Bologna
- 1998–99 (Lithuania) Žalgiris Kaunas
- 1999–00 (Greece) Panathinaikos
- 2000–01 (Israel) Maccabi Tel Aviv
- 2000–01 (Italy) Virtus Bologna
- 2001–02 (Greece) Panathinaikos
- 2002–03 (Spain) FC Barcelona
- 2003–04 (Israel) Maccabi Tel Aviv
- 2004–05 (Israel) Maccabi Tel Aviv
- 2005–06 (Russia) CSKA Moscow
- 2006–07 (Greece) Panathinaikos
- 2007–08 (Russia) CSKA Moscow
- 2008–09 (Greece) Panathinaikos
- 2009–10 (Spain) FC Barcelona
- 2010–11 (Greece) Panathinaikos
- 2011–12 (Greece) Olympiacos
- 2012–13 (Greece) Olympiacos
- 2013–14 (Israel) Maccabi Tel Aviv
- 2014–15 (Spain) Real Madrid
- 2015–16 (Russia) CSKA Moscow
- 2016–17 (Turkey) Fenerbahçe
- 2017–18 (Spain) Real Madrid
- 2018–19 (Russia) CSKA Moscow
- 2020–21 (Turkey) Anadolu Efes
- 2021–22 (Turkey) Anadolu Efes
- 2022–23 (Spain) Real Madrid
- 2023–24 (Greece) Panathinaikos AKTOR

== See also ==
- FIBA European Champions Cup and EuroLeague history
