= Dejan Bodiroga =

Serbian basketball player (born 1973)

- Дејан Бодирога
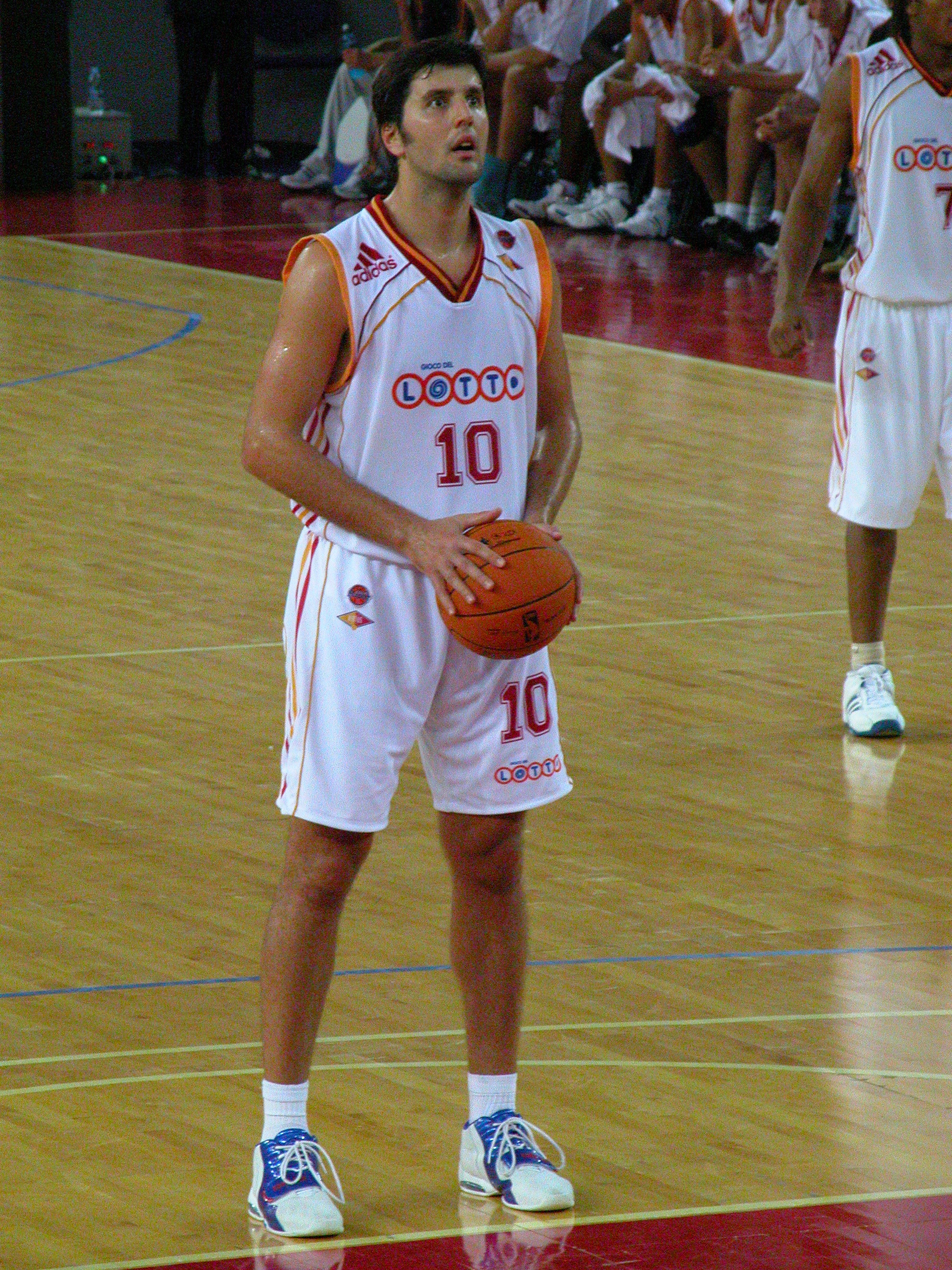
- Bodiroga in 2006

Member of the National Assembly
- Incumbent
- Assumed office 17 November 2026

President of Euroleague Basketball
- Incumbent
- Assumed office 14 September 2022
- Preceded by: Position established (Jordi Bertomeu as President and CEO)

Personal details
- Born: 2 March 1973 (age 53) Zrenjanin, SR Serbia, SFR Yugoslavia
- Party: Independent
- Other political affiliations: Student List (2026–present)
- Occupation: Basketball player; basketball executive; politician
- Basketball career

Personal information
- Listed height: 2.05 m (6 ft 9 in)
- Listed weight: 110 kg (243 lb)

Career information
- NBA draft: 1995: 2nd round, 51st overall pick
- Drafted by: Sacramento Kings
- Playing career: 1989–2007
- Position: Small forward
- Number: 4, 10, 15

Career history
- 1989–1991: Zadar
- 1992–1994: Trieste
- 1994–1996: Olimpia Milano
- 1996–1998: Real Madrid
- 1998–2002: Panathinaikos
- 2002–2005: Barcelona
- 2005–2007: Virtus Roma

Career highlights
- 3× EuroLeague champion (2000, 2002, 2003); 2× EuroLeague Final Four MVP (2002, 2003); EuroLeague 2000–2010 Player of the Decade; EuroLeague 2000–2010 All-Decade Team; EuroLeague 25th Anniversary Team (2025); 50 Greatest EuroLeague Contributors (2008); FIBA All-Time EuroStars Team (2007); 101 Greats of European Basketball (2018); 3× All-EuroLeague First Team (2002–2004); EuroLeague Top 16 MVP (2002); FIBA Saporta Cup champion (1997); 4× FIBA EuroStar (1997–1999, 2007); 2× ULEB All-Star (1993, 1994); 2× Liga ACB champion (2003, 2004); Spanish Cup winner (2003); Spanish Supercup winner (2004); Liga ACB MVP (1998); Liga ACB Finals MVP (2004); All-Liga ACB First Team (2004); Spanish Cup MVP (2003); Spanish Supercup MVP (2004); 3× Liga ACB All-Star (1996, 1997, 2003); Lega Basket Serie A champion (1996); Italian Cup winner (1996); 2× Italian All-Star (1993, 1994); 3× Greek Basket League champion (1999–2001); Greek Basket League MVP (1999); 2× Greek Basket League Finals MVP (1999, 2000); 3× Greek All-Star (1998, 1999, 2002); Greek All-Star Game MVP (1999); Greek League assists leader (2000); Greek Basket League Hall of Fame (2022); FIBA World Championship MVP (1998); FIBA Under-19 World Cup MVP (1991); 2× Best Athlete of Yugoslavia (1998, 2002); 2× Yugoslav Olympic Committee Sportsman of the Year (1998, 2002)
- Stats at Basketball Reference
Medals
Men's basketball
Representing (Federal Republic of Yugoslavia) FR Yugoslavia
Olympic Games
Silver medal – second place	1996 Atlanta	Team
FIBA World Championship
Gold medal – first place	1998 Athens	Team
Gold medal – first place	2002 Indianapolis	Team
EuroBasket
Gold medal – first place	1995 Greece	Team
Gold medal – first place	1997 Spain	Team
Gold medal – first place	2001 Turkey	Team
Bronze medal – third place	1999 France	Team

Dejan Bodiroga (Serbian Cyrillic: Дејан Бодирога; born 2 March 1973) is a Serbian politician, basketball executive and former professional player, who is currently the president of Euroleague Basketball and a member of the National Assembly. In 1998 and 2002, he received the Golden Badge award for the best athlete of Yugoslavia, and the Yugoslav Olympic Committee also declared him the Sportsman of the Year. He was named to the FIBA All-Time EuroStars Team in 2007. In 2018, he was named one of the 101 Greats of European Basketball. HoopsHype named Bodiroga one of the 75 Greatest International Players Ever in 2021. He was inducted into the Greek Basket League Hall of Fame in 2022.

During his playing career, he mainly played at the small forward position, but he could also play point forward, and at both guard positions. A EuroLeague icon of the early part of the 2000s, Bodiroga was named to the 50 Greatest EuroLeague Contributors in 2008, and to the EuroLeague 2000–2010 All-Decade Team in 2010. He was also voted by fans the EuroLeague's 2000–2010 Player of the Decade. At the club level, Bodiroga proved himself to be a symbol of basketball excellence, by lifting consecutive EuroLeague trophies in 2002 and 2003, with Panathinaikos and FC Barcelona, as he earned the EuroLeague Final Four MVP award both times. He also won each of the three major European national domestic basketball league titles: the Spanish ACB League, the Italian A League, and the Greek Basket League. He is widely regarded as one of the greatest European players of all time.

With the senior FR Yugoslavian national team, Bodiroga won three EuroBasket gold medals, in 1995, 1997, and 2001, as well as a bronze medal in 1999. With FR Yugoslavia, he also won a silver medal at the 1996 Summer Olympics. In addition to that, Bodiroga also won two FIBA World Cup gold medals with FR Yugoslavia, in 1998 and 2002, earning MVP honors in the former.

== Professional career ==
=== Yugoslavia (1989–1991) ===
Bodiroga first started playing structured basketball at the age of 13. He enrolled in Zrenjanin's Mašinac (Servo Mihalj) basketball section, under supervision of local basketball enthusiast Rade Prvulov. At the age of fifteen, he sprung up to 2.05m, and was quickly incorporated into the first team squad, coached by Miodrag Nikolić, a former OKK Belgrade and SFR Yugoslav national team player in the 1960s.

His domestic career took off when he was noticed by Krešimir Ćosić at a friendly youth tournament that featured Mašinac and Zadar among others, where Bodiroga scored 32 points in a game that pitted two teams. Ćosić then brought Bodiroga for a week-long basketball camp in Zadar and eventually persuaded Bodiroga's family to allow their son to move away to Zadar. In the meantime Bodiroga signed a pre-contract with Vojvodina so that when he finally went to Zadar in autumn 1989 he wasn't right away eligible for the first team, meaning that he first worked with coach Josip Grdović in the club's youth sections while simultaneously attending high school. After a year he was allowed to be moved into the full squad, then under head coach Slavko Trninić. After just one season in the first team, Bodiroga's stay in Zadar came to a premature end due to the impending war. Ćosić, his mentor, did everything in his power to help Bodiroga find a new club.

=== Italy (1992–1996) ===
Originally, trials were arranged with AEK and Olympiacos, with both clubs offering a contract solely on the condition that Bodiroga become a naturalised Greek citizen. He ultimately refused the conditions and ended up traveling to Italy instead, joining a Stefanel Trieste emerging team, coached by Bogdan Tanjević and financially backed by the Stefanel clothing empire. In Trieste, he first captured the attention of the wider basketball public. Shortly after his arrival in the summer of 1992, he made an impact, averaging 21.2 points per game over 32 league matches and leading his team to the playoffs. There, however, they were quickly disposed of in the second round by the more experienced Clear Cantù.

He had a stellar season for Trieste in 1993–94, this time leading his team deeper into the playoffs. Trieste also reached the FIBA Korać Cup final, where they surrendered to PAOK from Thessaloniki, who starred Zoran Savić, Walter Berry and Bane Prelević. After that season, Stefanel changed its backing to Olimpia Milano, sparking an exodus of Trieste players and coaches to Lombardy.

Bodiroga's leading role remained unchanged as he developed into an all-around player. In 1994–95, Olimpia reached the Korać Cup final, with players that also reached it the previous year in Trieste. However, they lost to Alba Berlin, coached by Svetislav Pešić, who would later play a big role in Bodiroga's career. On the home front, the team made it to the playoff semi-finals but lost 3–2 to the eventual champions, Buckler Bologna, led by another Serbian superstar, Predrag Danilović. The two Serbs turned the series into a personal duel, with Danilović's experience prevailing in the end.

The summer of 1995 Bodiroga joined FR Yugoslavia squad that returned after years of international exile. The team included players such as Aleksandar Đorđević, Vlade Divac, Žarko Paspalj, Danilović and Savić. Yugoslavia won the gold medal in the EuroBasket finals against Lithuania that featured the likes of Arvydas Sabonis, Šarūnas Marčiulionis, Rimas Kurtinaitis, and Artūras Karnišovas.

That same summer, Bodiroga was drafted by the Sacramento Kings in the 1995 NBA draft (second round, #51 overall). One year later, the Kings selected his younger countryman Peja Stojaković. However, unlike Stojaković, Bodiroga declined the offer to play in the NBA, choosing instead to remain in Europe. In 1995–96, Bodiroga won his first trophy in Milan, but the Korać Cup was again lost, this time to Efes Pilsen.

In the league, Bodiroga led the way with 23.3 points per game in 32 regular season matches. During the playoffs, they beat Virtus 3–1 in the semi-finals, and Teamsystem Bologna led by Myers, Đorđević and Alessandro Frosini. He took his place in the FR Yugoslav national team for the 1996 Olympics in Atlanta and he brought home a silver medal, with Dream Team III winning the gold.

=== Real Madrid (1996–1998) ===
For the 1996–97 season, Bodiroga joined Real Madrid after an offer of $1 million per season, and teaming up with coach Željko Obradović, whom he knew well from his national team stints. The squad also featured veteran Joe Arlauckas as well as established internationals Alberto Herreros and Mikhail Mikhaylov. In the Spanish ACB League finals, they faced an FC Barcelona team that boasted Aleksandar Đorđević, Jerrod Mustaf, and Artūras Karnišovas. FC Barcelona prevailed 3–2, winning the deciding 5th game 82–69 away, as Madrid settled with the European Cup trophy.

On the national basketball front, Yugoslavia rolled over the competition with considerable ease en route to another EuroBasket gold in 1997, with Bodiroga again playing an integral role. In the group stages, the Serbs faced Croatia, in the first meeting in basketball between the two nations since the breakup of the old Yugoslavia. The game carried much political tension and was low-scoring, with Đorđević winning it for FR Yugoslavia (by then comprising only Serbia and Montenegro) with a dramatic 3-pointer at the end.

In Bodiroga's next and final season with Real Madrid, (and without Obradovic, who had moved to Benetton Treviso) there were no improvements, as the team was ousted in the league's semifinals by TDK Manresa. He did achieve league MVP honours for the 1997–98 season. That summer brought another World Championship title for FR Yugoslavia, the first for Bodiroga. Now 25, Bodiroga was, together with Đorđević (who suffered knee problems and played few minutes) and Željko Rebrača, one of the team leaders.

=== Panathinaikos (1998–2002) ===
The same summer of 1998 also saw Bodiroga move to the Greek powerhouse Panathinaikos, where club chairman Pavlos Giannakopoulos began assembling a team to conquer Europe. As such, Bodiroga was the final piece of the jigsaw puzzle that already included Dino Rađa, Fragiskos Alvertis, Michael Koch, "Nando" Gentile, Pat Burke and coach Slobodan Subotić.

The Greens won the Greek League, but the EuroLeague ended in a disappointing note, leading to the departures of Radja and Subotić, with the latter's replacement being old acquaintance Željko Obradović, who brought along Željko Rebrača from Benetton Treviso, Johnny Rogers from Olympiacos and Oded Kattash from Maccabi Tel Aviv. After such an investment, Panathinaikos captured both the 1999–00 Greek League and the EuroLeague trophies, the latter coming in a final versus Maccabi Tel Aviv. In 2001, Panathinaikos again won the Greek Championship and also reached the SuproLeague final in Paris. A year later, Bodiroga was named the EuroLeague Final Four MVP, as the Greeks beat hosts Kinder Bologna, and their star player Manu Ginóbili 89–83.

In the international front, Bodiroga, as the team's undisputed leader, helped FR Yugoslavia win the EuroBasket 2001 in Turkey and the 2002 FIBA World Championship in Indianapolis. In this competition, the national side defeated Team USA in the quarterfinals and the Argentine national team in the final, in overtime.

=== Barcelona (2002–2005) ===
In the summer of 2002, Bodiroga returned to the Spanish league's FC Barcelona, which was managed by Svetislav Pešić and had players like Šarūnas Jasikevičius, Gregor Fučka and Juan Carlos Navarro. He won the EuroLeague with Barça (the first time the team achieved this), and also added two domestic league titles with them.

=== Virtus Roma (2005–2007) ===
In the 2005–06 season, Bodiroga came back to the Italian League, this time with Lottomatica Roma, re-joining coach Pešić, as the team played in the ULEB Cup (now called EuroCup). After getting eliminated from European contention in the round of 16 and losing the Italian Cup final (83–85) to Carpisa Napoli, Virtus finished the season in 6th place with a 22–12 record in the national league. Bodiroga finished the year with a 15.7 points-per-game regular season scoring average.

The playoff first round pitted Roma against favorites Montepaschi Siena. After dropping the first game, Bodiroga dominated the series in a 3–1 victory. During the 2006–07 season's playoffs, however, both teams played again, with the exact opposite outcome. After the fourth and final game, Bodiroga announced his retirement from professional basketball in June 2007.

== National team career ==
=== Junior national team ===
Bodiroga was a member of the SFR Yugoslav junior national teams. He played at the 1990 FIBA Europe Under-18 Championship. He also played at the FIBA Under-19 World Cup, where he was named the MVP of the tournament.

=== Senior national team ===
Bodiroga made his debut for the senior SFR Yugoslav national team in 1991, at the first round of the 1991 Mediterranean Games in Athens. He was also a regular member of the senior FR Yugoslavia national team, throughout the 1990s and early 2000s, participating in a total of three Summer Olympics (1996, 2000, 2004,) two FIBA World Cups (1998 and 2002) and five EuroBaskets (1995, 1997, 1999, 2001, and 2005).

Bodiroga retired from the national team after the EuroBasket 2005 fiasco, in which his team, one of the tournament's favorites, was eliminated as early as the first elimination round, by the French national team, on their own home court, in a tournament that ended with a verbal tirade by head coach Željko Obradović, at the team's final press conference. At which, the coach revealed there had been numerous fights between many of the team's players.

He won the following medals: EuroBasket 1995 (gold), 1996 Atlanta Summer Olympic Games (silver), EuroBasket 1997 (gold), 1998 FIBA World Championship (gold), EuroBasket 1999 (bronze), EuroBasket 2001 (gold), 2002 FIBA World Championship (gold). He was selected to the EuroBasket All-Tournament Teams in 1997 and 1999. He was also selected the FIBA World Cup MVP in 1998.

== EuroLeague career statistics ==
Legend
GP	Games played	GS	Games started	MPG	Minutes per game
FG%	Field-goal percentage	3P%	3-point field-goal percentage	FT%	Free-throw percentage
RPG	Rebounds per game	APG	Assists per game	SPG	Steals per game
BPG	Blocks per game	PPG	Points per game	PIR	Performance index rating
**Bold**	Career high

†	Denotes seasons in which Bodiroga's team won the EuroLeague

Year	Team	GP	GS	MPG	FG%	3P%	FT%	RPG	APG	SPG	BPG	PPG	PIR
1997–98	Real Madrid	16	N/A	31.3	.600	.313	.770	**5.8**	2.3	.4	.0	15.8	N/A
1998–99	Panathinaikos	17	N/A	**36.1**	**.624**	**.526**	.760	4.6	**3.6**	1.2	.0	**20.2**	N/A
1999–00†	Panathinaikos	22	N/A	34.6	.587	.375	.741	4.9	3.4	.8	.0	17.2	N/A
2000–01	Panathinaikos	**24**	N/A	30.4	.575	.381	.780	4.7	2.9	1.0	.0	17.8	N/A
2001–02†	Panathinaikos	22	17	32.3	.590	.390	.796	5.2	1.9	1.0	.0	20.0	**23.1**
2002–03†	Barcelona	22	**20**	31.5	.554	.417	.810	3.8	2.4	.8	.0	16.1	18.9
2003–04	Barcelona	17	17	32.3	.544	.313	.785	4.5	2.4	1.0	**.1**	14.8	17.5
2004–05	Barcelona	20	18	30.6	.532	.308	**.813**	4.8	1.1	.5	**.1**	15.1	16.0
2006–07	Lottomatica	19	17	29.1	.496	.415	.727	4.1	2.5	**1.4**	**.1**	13.6	14.7
Career		179	N/A	32.2	.567	.387	.778	4.7	2.5	.9	.0	16.8	N/A

== Titles ==
=== Club ===
- 1995–96: Olimpia Milano – Italian League, Italian Cup
- 1996–97: Real Madrid – FIBA EuroCup (FIBA Saporta Cup)
- 1998–99: Panathinaikos – Greek League
- 1999–00: Panathinaikos – EuroLeague, Greek League
- 2000–01: Panathinaikos – Greek League
- 2001–02: Panathinaikos – EuroLeague
- 2002–03: FC Barcelona – Spanish League, EuroLeague, Spanish Cup
- 2003–04: FC Barcelona – Spanish League, Spanish Supercup

=== Serbian senior national team ===
- EuroBasket: 3 Gold medals – 1995, 1997, 2001
- EuroBasket: 1 Bronze medal – 1999
- FIBA World Cup: 2 Gold medals – 1998, 2002
- Summer Olympic Games: 1 Silver medal – 1996

== Individual honours and awards ==
=== Junior national team ===
- 1991 FIBA Under-19 World Cup: MVP

=== Senior national team ===
- 1997 EuroBasket: All-Tournament Team
- 1998 FIBA World Championship: All-Tournament Team
- 1998 FIBA World Championship: MVP
- 2× Yugoslavian Athlete of the Year: 1998, 2002
- 2× Yugoslav Olympic Committee Sportsman of the Year: 1998, 2002
- 1999 EuroBasket: All-Tournament Team

=== Pro clubs ===
- 2× Italian League All-Star: 1993, 1994
- 2× ULEB All-Star: 1993, 1994
- 3× Spanish League All-Star: 1996, 1997, 2003
- 4× FIBA EuroStar: 1997, 1998, 1999, 2007
- Spanish League MVP: 1997–98
- 3× Greek League All-Star: 1998, 1999, 2002
- Greek All-Star Game MVP: 1999
- Greek League MVP: 1998–99
- 2× Greek League Finals MVP (1998–99, 1999–00)
- 2× EuroLeague Finals Top Scorer: 2001, 2003
- EuroLeague Top 16 MVP: 2001–02
- 2× EuroLeague Final Four MVP: 2001–02, and 2002–03
- 3× All-EuroLeague 1st Team choice: 2001–02, 2002–03, and 2003–04
- All-Europe Player of the Year: 2002
- Spanish Cup (Copa del Rey) MVP: 2003
- Spanish Supercup MVP: 2004
- Spanish League Finals MVP: 2004
- All-Spanish League Team: (2004)
- FIBA All-Time EuroStars Team: 2007
- 50 Greatest EuroLeague Contributors: 2008
- EuroLeague 2000–2010 All-Decade Team: 2010
- EuroLeague 2000–2010 Player of the Decade: 2010
- 101 Greats of European Basketball: 2018
- HoopsHype's 75 Greatest International Players Ever: 2021
- Greek League Hall of Fame: 2022

== Executive career ==
After retiring from playing professional basketball in June 2007, Bodiroga became the general manager of the Italian club Virtus Roma, thus continuing at the club where he finished his playing career. He ended his general manager term in June 2009.

In April 2010, Bodiroga along with fellow former player Željko Rebrača sued the Carmel, Indiana-based company Worldwide Associates LLC for investment fraud. They allege in their suit they each gave the company more than $4 million to manage, which the company used as venture capital in speculative startup companies instead of investing it in traditional securities.

From 2011 to 2015, he served as the Vice President of the Basketball Federation of Serbia (KSS). In June 2014, he was appointed as the President of the Competition Commission of FIBA Europe. In February 2015, Bodiroga left the Basketball Federation of Serbia, in order to focus more on his job with FIBA Europe.

In May 2022, Bodiroga was announced as one of the candidates to be the successor of Jordi Bertomeu, to take over the role of President of Euroleague Basketball. On 14 September 2022, Bodiroga was officially named EuroLeague Basketball's new President.

== Political activity ==
Bodiroga became one of the most prominent public supporters of the student-led anti-corruption protests that followed the Novi Sad railway station canopy collapse in November 2024. In December 2024, he told N1 that the students were fighting "smartly, with dignity and courage" for truth and justice, and were "certainly the future of this country". He welcomed the new year 2025 with protesters in Belgrade, and in early 2025 attended the large protests in Novi Sad, Kragujevac and Niš, and the rally in Belgrade on 15 March. In Niš, he said the students were "the guiding light" and that institutions had to start working "so that we can have a normal state".

At the students' "See You on Vidovdan" rally at Slavija on 28 June 2025, he was one of the speakers chosen by the students. He criticised those who called the protesting youth "terrorists" while "protecting the worst criminals". In December 2025, he joined students of the Belgrade Faculty of Law marking a year of their blockade, saying "we will always be with the students", and on 28 December he signed the students' petition calling for early elections, alongside University of Belgrade rector Vladan Đokić.

Ahead of the 2026 Serbian parliamentary election, reports that he might head the Student List drew objections from pro-government media. When the list was submitted to the Republic Electoral Commission on 14 September 2026, he was placed 24th, while continuing to serve as president of Euroleague Basketball.

== Personal life ==
The son of Vaso and Milka Bodiroga, Dejan is a devout Serbian Orthodox Christian. His father hails from the village of Bodiroge near Trebinje and was among the wave of migrants from Herzegovina that moved northwards following the devastations of World War II. On 13 July 2003 Bodiroga married his long-time fiancée Ivana Medić; the couple's first child was born in 2004.

Bodiroga is a relative of Croatian basketball players Dražen Petrović and Aleksandar Petrović. Bodiroga's paternal grandmother and their paternal grandfather were brother and sister, making Bodiroga and the Petrović brothers second cousins. Although he never played for the club, Bodiroga is a declared fan of Partizan and is often seen at their games. Bodiroga is one of the founding members of the Group Seven Children's Foundation.

Bodiroga is one of a small number of players that have won the EuroLeague championship with clubs from two different countries, and he is also one of the few players to win each of the top three most important European national domestic leagues historically, the Italian League, the Greek League, and the Spanish League. During his playing career, Bodiroga had several nicknames – Bodi Bond, "White Magic", Mr. MVP, and God.

In Serbia, Bodiroga is credited for his unassuming and quiet demeanor. He is also highly regarded by fans of the Greek club Panathinaikos for the passion that he displayed in matches against the club's arch-rivals, Olympiacos.

== See also ==
- Sacramento Kings draft history

Sporting positions
New creation	Vice president of the Basketball Federation of Serbia for men's basketball 2011–2015	Succeeded by Igor Rakočević
Preceded by Predrag Danilović	Serbia and Montenegro captain 2001 – 2005	Succeeded by Igor Rakočević
Awards
Preceded by Predrag Mijatović; Aleksandar Šoštar	The Best Athlete of Yugoslavia; 1998; 2002	Succeeded by Vladimir Grbić; Vladimir Vujasinović (for Serbia and Montenegro)
Olympic Games
Preceded by Vladimir Grbić (for FR Yugoslavia)	Flagbearer for Serbia and Montenegro; Athens 2004	Succeeded by Jasna Šekarić (for Serbia)
