= 2001–02 Euroleague =

Sports season

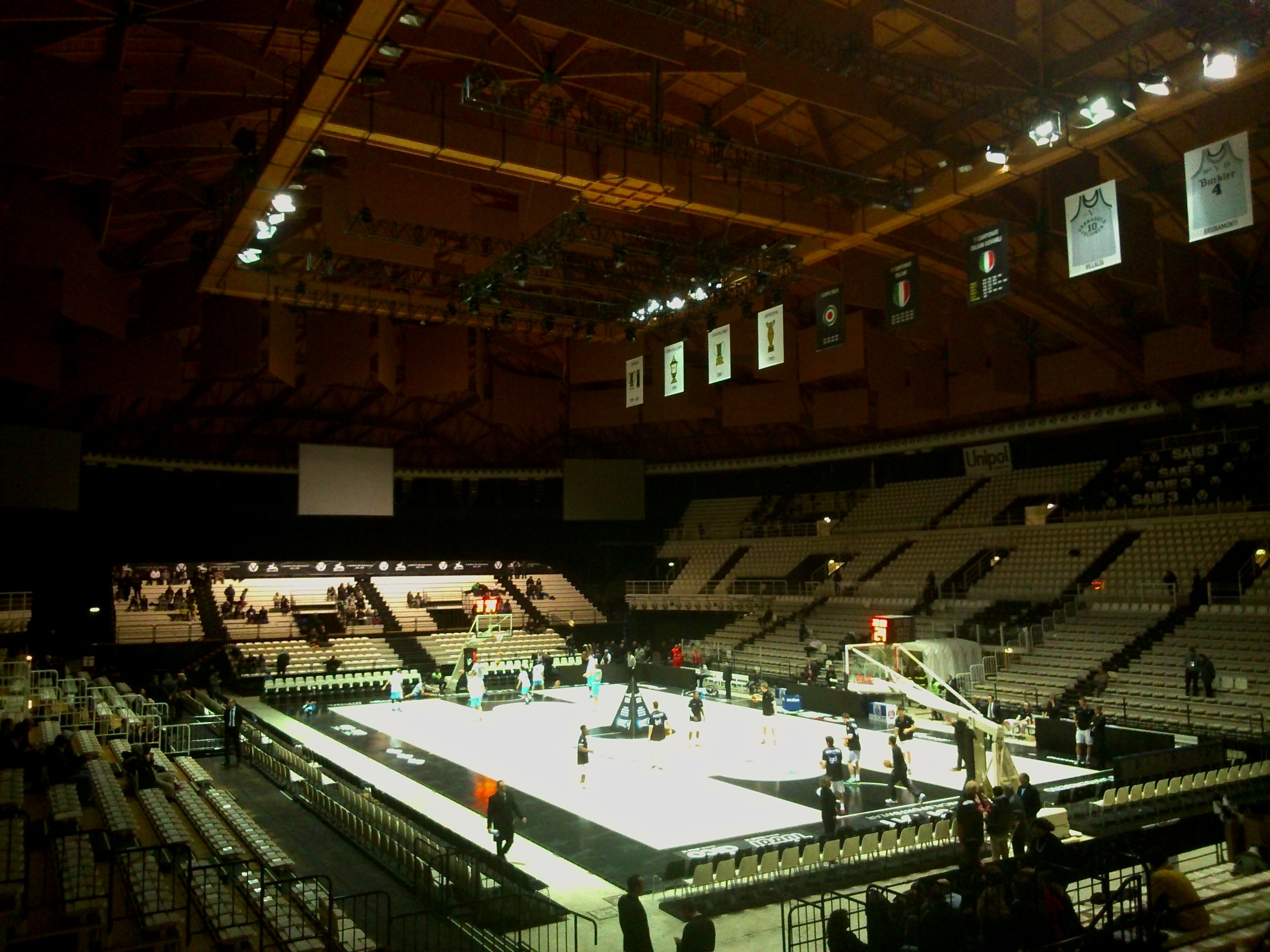
- The PalaMalaguti in Bologna hosted the Final
- Season: 2001–02
- Duration: 10 October 2001 – 12 May 2002
- Teams: 32 (regular season); 41 (total)

Finals
- Champions: (Greece) Panathinaikos (3rd title)
- Runners-up: (Italy) Kinder Bologna

Awards
- Group Stage MVP: (Turkey) Mirsad Türkcan
- Top 16 MVP: (Federal Republic of Yugoslavia) Dejan Bodiroga
- Final Four MVP: (Federal Republic of Yugoslavia) Dejan Bodiroga

Statistical leaders
| Points | (United States) Alphonso Ford | 24.8 |
| Rebounds | (Turkey) Mirsad Türkcan | 12.8 |
| Assists | (United States) Elmer Bennett | 5.3 |
| Index Rating | (Turkey) Mirsad Türkcan | 25.8 |

The 2001–02 Euroleague was the second season of the professional basketball competition for elite clubs throughout Europe, organised by Euroleague Basketball Company, and it was the 45th season of the premier competition for European men's clubs overall. The season started on October 10, 2001, and ended on May 5, 2002.

The Final Four was hosted in the PalaMalaguti in Bologna, Italy. A number of 32 teams competed for the championship, which was won by Panathinaikos. Mirsad Türkcan was named Regular season MVP, while Dejan Bodiroga was awarded EuroLeague Top 16 MVP and EuroLeague Final Four MVP.

== Unification of FIBA Suproleague and ULEB Euroleague ==
FIBA and ULEB at the end of the 2000–01 season, struck a deal for the unification of the ULEB Euroleague and Suproleague in a new competition, that would be named Euroleague.

The following 21 teams had a guaranteed spot in the 2001-02 Euroleague (8 from FIBA and 13 from ULEB):

- Croatia (2): K.K. Cibona V.I.P, K.K. Zadar
- England (1): London Towers
- France (2): Asvel Lyon-Villeurbanne, E.B. Pau Orthez
- Germany (2): Opel Skyliners, Alba Berlin
- Greece (2): Olympiakos, Panathinaikos
- Israel (1): Maccabi Elite Tel Aviv
- Italy (3): Kinder Bologna, Paf Bologna, Benetton Treviso
- Lithuania (1): Zalgiris Kaunas
- Russia (1): C.S.K.A. Moscow
- Slovenia (1): Union Olimpija Ljubljana
- Spain (2): F.C. Barcelona, Real Madrid
- Turkey (2): Efes Pilsen, Ülker S.C.
- Yugoslavia (1): K.K. Buducnost

Also, 8 teams from Belgium (1), Greece (2), Italy (1), Poland (1), Spain (2) and Yugoslavia (1) accessed the competition via their national championships.

Regarding the 3 remaining spots, there was also a preliminary round in the beginning of July 2001 between 12 teams, one from each of the following countries: Belgium, Croatia, France, Germany, Israel, Lithuania, Portugal, Russia, Slovenia, Sweden, Switzerland, Turkey.

== Euroleague opening tournament ==
The 2001–02 season was the first run by ULEB and its company, the Euroleague Basketball, after FIBA Europe agreed that it would no longer organise Europe's top competition. Given that the previous season there were two main competitions, the 2000–01 FIBA Suproleague and the 2000–01 Euroleague, thus two European champions (Maccabi Tel Aviv and Kinder Bologna), it was decided that an opening tournament would be played to determine the unofficial champion. The Euroleague opening tournament was hosted in Ljubljana by Union Olimpija and was won by Cibona VIP, the only guest of the tournament, beating Maccabi Tel Aviv 78–67 in the final.

== Competition system ==
- 41 teams in total with the qualification rounds, and 32 teams at the first group stage (the national domestic league champions from the best leagues, and a variable number of other clubs from the most important national domestic leagues), playing in a tournament system. The competition culminated in a Final Four.

== Team allocation ==
=== Distribution ===
The table below shows the default access list.

| | Teams entering in this round | Teams advancing from previous round |
|---|---|---|
| First qualifying round (6 teams) | The champion from Sweden; The runners-up teams from: Germany; Lithuania; Slovenia; The third-placed teams from: Croatia; Turkey | |
| Second qualifying round (8 teams) | The champion teams from: Portugal; Switzerland; The runners-up teams from: Belgium; Israel; The third-placed from France | 3 winner teams from first qualifying round |
| Third qualifying round (4 teams) | | 4 winner teams from second qualifying round |
| Regular season (32 teams) | 21 licensed teams; 2 best-placed teams from: Greece; Spain; 1 best-placed team from: Belgium; Italy; Poland; Russia; Yugoslavia | 2 winner teams from third qualifying round |
| Top 16 (16 teams) | | 4 group winners from the regular season; 4 group runners-up from the regular season; 4 group third-placed teams from the regular season; 4 group fourth-placed teams from the regular season |
| Final Four (4 teams) | | 4 group winners from the top 16 |

=== Teams ===
The labels in the parentheses show how each team qualified for the place of its starting round (TH: EuroLeague title holders)

- 1st, 2nd, etc.: League position after Playoffs
- LC: 2-year or 3-year licence

Regular season
| (Spain) FC Barcelona (1st)^{LC} | (Italy) Kinder Bologna^{TH} (1st)^{LC} | (Germany) ALBA Berlin (1st)^{LC} | (Belgium) Telindus Oostende (1st) |
| (Spain) Real Madrid (2nd)^{LC} | (Italy) Skipper Bologna (2nd)^{LC} | (Germany) Opel Skyliners (8th)^{LC} | (United Kingdom) Kinder London Towers (3rd)^{LC} |
| (Spain) Tau Cerámica (3rd) | (Italy) Scavolini Pesaro (3rd) | (Russia) Ural Great (1st) | (Israel) Maccabi Elite^{TH} (1st)^{LC} |
| (Spain) Unicaja Málaga (4th) | (Italy) Benetton Treviso (4th)^{LC} | (Russia) CSKA Moscow (4th)^{LC} | (Lithuania) Žalgiris (1st)^{LC} |
| (Greece) Panathinaikos (1st)^{LC} | (Croatia) Cibona VIP (1st)^{LC} | (Turkey) Ülker (1st)^{LC} | (Poland) Idea Śląsk (1st) |
| (Greece) Olympiacos (2nd)^{LC} | (Croatia) Zadar (2nd)^{LC} | (Turkey) Efes Pilsen (2nd)^{LC} | (Slovenia) Union Olimpija (1st)^{LC} |
| (Greece) Peristeri (3rd) | (France) Pau-Orthez (1st)^{LC} | (Federal Republic of Yugoslavia) Budućnost (1st)^{LC} | |
| (Greece) AEK (4th) | (France) ASVEL (2nd)^{LC} | (Federal Republic of Yugoslavia) Partizan ICN (2nd) | |
Second qualifying round
| (Belgium) Spirou (2nd) | (France) Le Mans (3rd) | (Israel) Hapoel Jerusalem (2nd) | Portugal Telecom (1st) |
| (Switzerland) Lugano Snakes (1st) | | | |
First qualifying round
| (Croatia) Split CO (3rd) | (Germany) Telekom Bonn (2nd) | (Lithuania) Lietuvos Rytas (2nd) | (Slovenia) Krka (2nd) |
| (Sweden) Alvik (1st) | (Turkey) Darüşşafaka (3rd) | | |

== Qualifying rounds ==
=== First qualifying round ===
| Team 1 | Agg. | Team 2 | 1st leg | 2nd leg |
|---|---|---|---|---|
| Darüşşafaka (Turkey) | 135–171 | (Germany) Telekom Bonn | 81–94 | 54–77 |
| Lietuvos Rytas (Lithuania) | 158–159 | (Croatia) Split CO | 87–71 | 71–88 |
| Alvik (Sweden) | 0–40 | (Slovenia) Krka | 0–20 | 0–20 |

1. Alvik withdrew.

=== Second qualifying round ===
| Team 1 | Agg. | Team 2 | 1st leg | 2nd leg |
|---|---|---|---|---|
| Portugal Telecom | 150–198 | (Belgium) Spirou | 77–92 | 73–106 |
| Telekom Bonn (Germany) | 166–159 | (Croatia) Split CO | 76–73 | 90–86 |
| Krka (Slovenia) | 40–0 | (Switzerland) Lugano Snakes | 20–0 | 20–0 |
| Le Mans (France) | 0–40 | (Israel) Hapoel Jerusalem | 0–20 | 0–20 |

1. Lugano Snakes withdrew.
2. Le Mans withdrew.

=== Third qualifying round ===
| Team 1 | Agg. | Team 2 | 1st leg | 2nd leg |
|---|---|---|---|---|
| Spirou (Belgium) | 162–141 | (Israel) Hapoel Jerusalem | 84–70 | 78–71 |
| Krka (Slovenia) | 162–153 | (Germany) Telekom Bonn | 89–82 | 73–71 |

== Regular season ==
The first phase was a regular season, in which the competing teams were drawn into four groups, each containing eight teams. Each team played every other team in its group at home and away, resulting in 14 games for each team in the first stage. The top 4 teams in each group advanced to the next round, The Top 16. The complete list of tiebreakers is provided in the lead-in to the Regular Season results.

If one or more clubs were level on won-lost record, tiebreakers were applied in the following order:

1. Head-to-head record in matches between the tied clubs
2. Overall point difference in games between the tied clubs
3. Overall point difference in all group matches (first tiebreaker if tied clubs were not in the same group)
4. Points scored in all group matches
5. Sum of quotients of points scored and points allowed in each group match

=== Group A ===
| Pos | Team | Pld | W | L | PF | PA | PD | Qualification | (Italy) BEN | (Israel) MTA | (Greece) OLY | (Turkey) EFES | (Spain) UNI | (Poland) SLA | (Germany) ALB | (Belgium) SPI |
|---|---|---|---|---|---|---|---|---|---|---|---|---|---|---|---|---|
| 1 | (Italy) Benetton Treviso | 14 | 11 | 3 | 1206 | 1142 | +64 | Advance to Top 16 | — | 87–83 | 89–81 | 88–86 | 98–94 | 88–72 | 100–71 | 86–78 |
| 2 | (Israel) Maccabi Elite | 14 | 10 | 4 | 1101 | 1021 | +80 | Advance to Top 16 | 80–74 | — | 78–73 | 76–78 | 82–60 | 75–56 | 82–70 | 94–78 |
| 3 | (Greece) Olympiacos | 14 | 10 | 4 | 1205 | 1098 | +107 | Advance to Top 16 | 87–91 | 94–91 | — | 87–72 | 81–80 | 101–79 | 91–75 | 107–78 |
| 4 | (Turkey) Efes Pilsen | 14 | 9 | 5 | 1059 | 1032 | +27 | Advance to Top 16 | 87–78 | 68–72 | 79–80 | — | 75–71 | 63–51 | 78–72 | 78–65 |
| 5 | (Spain) Unicaja Málaga | 14 | 6 | 8 | 1054 | 1052 | +2 | | 67–68 | 79–84 | 86–79 | 66–67 | — | 65–66 | 86–79 | 79–68 |
| 6 | (Poland) Idea Śląsk | 14 | 4 | 10 | 1001 | 1061 | −60 | | 91–93 | 79–65 | 75–80 | 74–79 | 58–63 | — | 71–66 | 94–95 |
| 7 | (Germany) Alba Berlin | 14 | 3 | 11 | 1065 | 1153 | −88 | | 89–83 | 64–65 | 69–88 | 73–74 | 72–84 | 75–64 | — | 99–87 |
| 8 | (Belgium) Spirou | 14 | 3 | 11 | 1049 | 1181 | −132 | | 76–83 | 63–74 | 56–76 | 79–75 | 75–77 | 53–71 | 100–91 | — |

Source: Euroleague
Legend: Blue = home team win; Red = away team win.

=== Group B ===
| Pos | Team | Pld | W | L | PF | PA | PD | Qualification | (Italy) KIN | (Spain) FCB | (Turkey) ULK | (Slovenia) UOL | (Germany) SKY | (Lithuania) ŽAL | (Greece) PER | (United Kingdom) LON |
|---|---|---|---|---|---|---|---|---|---|---|---|---|---|---|---|---|
| 1 | (Italy) Kinder Bologna | 14 | 12 | 2 | 1163 | 969 | +194 | Advance to Top 16 | — | 91–81 | 68–60 | 86–70 | 69–62 | 90–54 | 87–72 | 94–72 |
| 2 | (Spain) FC Barcelona | 14 | 10 | 4 | 1211 | 1050 | +161 | Advance to Top 16 | 69–85 | — | 85–64 | 81–61 | 90–81 | 90–86 | 73–77 | 101–63 |
| 3 | (Turkey) Ülker | 14 | 9 | 5 | 1104 | 1051 | +53 | Advance to Top 16 | 51–75 | 77–87 | — | 75–63 | 78–76 | 79–66 | 93–79 | 107–64 |
| 4 | (Slovenia) Union Olimpija | 14 | 9 | 5 | 1085 | 971 | +114 | Advance to Top 16 | 85–89 | 80–74 | 78–80 | — | 81–55 | 87–66 | 81–74 | 73–40 |
| 5 | (Germany) Opel Skyliners | 14 | 8 | 6 | 1037 | 1060 | −23 | | 80–79 | 74–88 | 74–70 | 56–79 | — | 84–75 | 72–55 | 61–57 |
| 6 | (Lithuania) Žalgiris | 14 | 5 | 9 | 1054 | 1097 | −43 | | 91–67 | 72–92 | 79–82 | 70–81 | 73–75 | — | 81–78 | 90–72 |
| 7 | (Greece) Peristeri | 14 | 3 | 11 | 1058 | 1158 | −100 | | 59–87 | 72–101 | 82–95 | 67–75 | 89–93 | 62–70 | — | 99–75 |
| 8 | (United Kingdom) Kinder London Towers | 14 | 0 | 14 | 910 | 1266 | −356 | | 57–96 | 67–99 | 75–93 | 58–91 | 77–94 | 58–81 | 75–87 | — |

Source: Euroleague
Legend: Blue = home team win; Red = away team win.

=== Group C ===
| Pos | Team | Pld | W | L | PF | PA | PD | Qualification | (Greece) PAO | (Spain) RMB | (Italy) SKI | (Russia) CSKA | (Slovenia) KRK | (France) PAU | (Federal Republic of Yugoslavia) BUD | (Croatia) ZAD |
|---|---|---|---|---|---|---|---|---|---|---|---|---|---|---|---|---|
| 1 | (Greece) Panathinaikos | 14 | 12 | 2 | 1176 | 1073 | +103 | Advance to Top 16 | — | 77–88 | 81–70 | 83–80 | 98–92 | 67–63 | 91–82 | 102–64 |
| 2 | (Spain) Real Madrid | 14 | 9 | 5 | 1211 | 1123 | +88 | Advance to Top 16 | 70–78 | — | 87–82 | 82–86 | 87–93 | 92–80 | 90–71 | 114–84 |
| 3 | (Italy) Skipper Bologna | 14 | 8 | 6 | 1193 | 1151 | +42 | Advance to Top 16 | 77–79 | 93–77 | — | 97–99 | 73–88 | 83–75 | 109–79 | 95–85 |
| 4 | (Russia) CSKA Moscow | 14 | 8 | 6 | 1221 | 1189 | +32 | Advance to Top 16 | 85–91 | 77–92 | 75–77 | — | 86–80 | 80–69 | 88–83 | 96–92 |
| 5 | (Slovenia) Krka | 14 | 7 | 7 | 1245 | 1222 | +23 | | 82–81 | 79–95 | 94–100 | 107–93 | — | 84–93 | 101–74 | 91–94 |
| 6 | (France) Pau-Orthez | 14 | 7 | 7 | 1126 | 1114 | +12 | | 67–79 | 78–74 | 86–69 | 91–83 | 74–84 | — | 87–90 | 101–73 |
| 7 | (Federal Republic of Yugoslavia) Budućnost | 14 | 3 | 11 | 1108 | 1257 | −149 | | 72–84 | 72–82 | 70–86 | 72–103 | 77–72 | 77–79 | — | 110–97 |
| 8 | (Croatia) Zadar | 14 | 2 | 12 | 1156 | 1307 | −151 | | 81–85 | 73–81 | 76–82 | 73–90 | 97–98 | 79–83 | 88–79 | — |

Source: Euroleague
Legend: Blue = home team win; Red = away team win.

=== Group D ===
| Pos | Team | Pld | W | L | PF | PA | PD | Qualification | (Spain) TAU | (Greece) AEK | (Russia) URA | (Italy) SCA | (France) ASV | (Federal Republic of Yugoslavia) PAR | (Croatia) CIB | (Belgium) OOS |
|---|---|---|---|---|---|---|---|---|---|---|---|---|---|---|---|---|
| 1 | (Spain) Tau Cerámica | 14 | 9 | 5 | 1219 | 1057 | +162 | Advance to Top 16 | — | 82–62 | 112–84 | 86–68 | 90–66 | 80–85 | 81–58 | 114–78 |
| 2 | (Greece) AEK | 14 | 9 | 5 | 1152 | 1102 | +50 | Advance to Top 16 | 85–82 | — | 99–85 | 68–70 | 87–65 | 106–70 | 72–69 | 86–79 |
| 3 | (Russia) Ural Great | 14 | 8 | 6 | 1266 | 1260 | +6 | Advance to Top 16 | 94–88 | 86–77 | — | 99–88 | 103–98 | 110–111 | 85–66 | 109–79 |
| 4 | (Italy) Scavolini Pesaro | 14 | 8 | 6 | 1124 | 1137 | −13 | Advance to Top 16 | 75–85 | 68–89 | 103–85 | — | 65–99 | 98–86 | 88–75 | 86–75 |
| 5 | (France) ASVEL | 14 | 8 | 6 | 1147 | 1135 | +12 | | 73–71 | 86–84 | 73–75 | 63–80 | — | 78–91 | 99–84 | 89–76 |
| 6 | (Federal Republic of Yugoslavia) Partizan ICN | 14 | 6 | 8 | 1138 | 1191 | −53 | | 59–65 | 69–74 | 85–80 | 68–80 | 82–88 | — | 81–76 | 86–77 |
| 7 | (Croatia) Cibona VIP | 14 | 5 | 9 | 1110 | 1165 | −55 | | 96–95 | 89–90 | 102–97 | 71–74 | 70–82 | 85–71 | — | 85–76 |
| 8 | (Belgium) Telindus Oostende | 14 | 3 | 11 | 1138 | 1247 | −109 | | 74–88 | 102–73 | 79–84 | 88–81 | 77–88 | 104–94 | 74–84 | — |

Source: Euroleague
Legend: Blue = home team win; Red = away team win.

== Top 16 ==
The remaining 16 teams were placed into four groups of four teams each. Each team played every other team in its group twice, once at home and once away. The top teams of each of the four groups advanced to the Final Four.

=== Group E ===
| Pos | Team | Pld | W | L | PF | PA | PD | Qualification | (Italy) BEN | (Spain) FCB | (Italy) SKI | (Italy) SCA |
|---|---|---|---|---|---|---|---|---|---|---|---|---|
| 1 | (Italy) Benetton Treviso | 6 | 4 | 2 | 538 | 481 | +57 | Advance to Final Four | — | 89–75 | 96–90 | 94–66 |
| 2 | (Spain) FC Barcelona | 6 | 4 | 2 | 499 | 483 | +16 | | 76–75 | — | 77–59 | 90–76 |
| 3 | (Italy) Skipper Bologna | 6 | 2 | 4 | 482 | 509 | −27 | | 73–86 | 97–93 | — | 73–86 |
| 4 | (Italy) Scavolini Pesaro | 6 | 2 | 4 | 487 | 533 | −46 | | 101–98 | 87–88 | 71–90 | — |

Source: Euroleague
Legend: Blue = home team win; Red = away team win.

=== Group F ===
| Pos | Team | Pld | W | L | PF | PA | PD | Qualification | (Italy) KIN | (Turkey) EFS | (Spain) RMB | (Russia) UGR |
|---|---|---|---|---|---|---|---|---|---|---|---|---|
| 1 | (Italy) Kinder Bologna | 6 | 4 | 2 | 460 | 432 | +28 | Advance to Final Four | — | 77–71 | 71–82 | 72–61 |
| 2 | (Turkey) Efes Pilsen | 6 | 3 | 3 | 506 | 481 | +25 | | 73–76 | — | 63–67 | 101–84 |
| 3 | (Spain) Real Madrid | 6 | 3 | 3 | 500 | 528 | −28 | | 58–86 | 92–109 | — | 88–95 |
| 4 | (Russia) Ural Great | 6 | 2 | 4 | 516 | 541 | −25 | | 87–78 | 85–89 | 104–113 | — |

Source: Euroleague
Legend: Blue = home team win; Red = away team win.

=== Group G ===
| Pos | Team | Pld | W | L | PF | PA | PD | Qualification | (Greece) PAO | (Greece) OLY | (Greece) AEK | (Slovenia) UOL |
|---|---|---|---|---|---|---|---|---|---|---|---|---|
| 1 | (Greece) Panathinaikos | 6 | 5 | 1 | 496 | 467 | +29 | Advance to Final Four | — | 88–78 | 96–92 | 85–67 |
| 2 | (Greece) Olympiacos | 6 | 4 | 2 | 480 | 452 | +28 | | 92–75 | — | 75–69 | 85–89 |
| 3 | (Greece) AEK | 6 | 2 | 4 | 474 | 475 | −1 | | 66–73 | 66–75 | — | 97–87 |
| 4 | (Slovenia) Union Olimpija | 6 | 1 | 5 | 450 | 506 | −56 | | 72–79 | 66–75 | 69–85 | — |

Source: Euroleague
Legend: Blue = home team win; Red = away team win.

=== Group H ===
| Pos | Team | Pld | W | L | PF | PA | PD | Qualification | (Israel) MTA | (Spain) TAU | (Russia) CSK | (Turkey) ULK |
|---|---|---|---|---|---|---|---|---|---|---|---|---|
| 1 | (Israel) Maccabi Elite | 6 | 4 | 2 | 410 | 370 | +40 | Advance to Final Four | — | 77–78 | 69–68 | 2–0 |
| 2 | (Spain) Tau Cerámica | 6 | 4 | 2 | 496 | 472 | +24 | | 65–94 | — | 73–87 | 101–69 |
| 3 | (Russia) CSKA Moscow | 6 | 3 | 3 | 486 | 485 | +1 | | 81–77 | 73–90 | — | 86–80 |
| 4 | (Turkey) Ülker | 6 | 1 | 5 | 395 | 460 | −65 | | 78–91 | 72–89 | 96–91 | — |

Source: Euroleague
Legend: Blue = home team win; Red = away team win.
1. Ülker withdrew.

== Final Four ==
Semifinals; 3 May
(Italy) Benetton Treviso | 82
(Italy) Kinder Bologna | 90
(Greece) Panathinaikos | 83
(Israel) Maccabi Elite | 75

Final; 5 May
(Italy) Kinder Bologna | 83
(Greece) Panathinaikos | 89

2001–02 Euroleague Champions

Panathinaikos
3rd title

== Awards ==
=== Top Scorer ===
| Player | Team |
|---|---|
| (United States) Alphonso Ford | (Greece) Olympiacos |

=== Regular season MVP ===
| Player | Team |
|---|---|
| (Turkey) Mirsad Türkcan | (Russia) CSKA Moscow |

=== Top 16 MVP ===
| Player | Team |
|---|---|
| (Federal Republic of Yugoslavia) Dejan Bodiroga | (Greece) Panathinaikos |

=== Final Four MVP ===
| Player | Team |
|---|---|
| (Federal Republic of Yugoslavia) Dejan Bodiroga | (Greece) Panathinaikos |

=== Finals Top Scorer ===
| Player | Team |
|---|---|
| (Argentina) Manu Ginóbili | (Italy) Kinder Bologna |

=== All-Euroleague First Team ===
| Player | Team |
|---|---|
| (United States) Tyus Edney | (Italy) Benetton Treviso |
| (Federal Republic of Yugoslavia) Marko Jarić | (Italy) Kinder Bologna |
| (Argentina) Manu Ginóbili | (Italy) Kinder Bologna |
| (Federal Republic of Yugoslavia) Dejan Bodiroga | (Greece) Panathinaikos |
| (Federal Republic of Yugoslavia) Dejan Tomašević | (Spain) Tau Cerámica |

=== All-Euroleague Second Team ===
| Player | Team |
|---|---|
| (Slovenia) Ariel McDonald | (Israel) Maccabi Elite |
| (United States) Alphonso Ford | (Greece) Olympiacos |
| (Turkey) Mirsad Türkcan | (Russia) CSKA Moscow |
| (Argentina) Marcelo Nicola | (Italy) Benetton Treviso |
| (United States) Joseph Blair | (Italy) Scavolini Pesaro |

=== Round MVP ===
==== Regular season ====
| Week | Player | Team | PIR |
|---|---|---|---|
| 1 | (Turkey) Asım Pars | (Turkey) Ülker | 39 |
| 2 | (Slovenia) Jaka Lakovič | (Slovenia) Krka | 55 |
| 3 | (Italy) Gregor Fučka | (Italy) Skipper Bologna | 37 |
| 4 | (Italy) Gregor Fučka (2) | (Italy) Skipper Bologna | 45 |
| 5 | (Turkey) Mirsad Türkcan | (Russia) CSKA Moscow | 36 |
| 5 | (Federal Republic of Yugoslavia) Sasha Đjorđjević | (Spain) Real Madrid | 36 |
| 6 | (Russia) Valeri Daineko | (Russia) Ural Great | 40 |
| 7 | (Greece) Dimos Dikoudis | (Greece) AEK | 42 |
| 8 | (Lithuania) Andrius Giedraitis | (Belgium) Telindus Oostende | 43 |
| 9 | (Russia) Ruslan Avleev | (Russia) Ural Great | 47 |
| 10 | (Turkey) Mirsad Türkcan (2) | (Russia) CSKA Moscow | 43 |
| 11 | (Croatia) Nikola Prkačin | (Croatia) Cibona VIP | 41 |
| 12 | (Turkey) Mirsad Türkcan (3) | (Russia) CSKA Moscow | 34 |
| 12 | (Belgium) Ron Ellis | (Belgium) Spirou | 34 |
| 13 | (Ukraine) Grigorij Khizhnyak | (Lithuania) Žalgiris | 36 |
| 13 | (Slovenia) Beno Udrih | (Slovenia) Union Olimpija | 36 |
| 13 | (France) Yann Bonato | (France) ASVEL | 36 |
| 14 | (Ukraine) Grigorij Khizhnyak (2) | (Lithuania) Žalgiris | 36 |

==== Top 16 ====
| Week | Player | Team | PIR |
|---|---|---|---|
| 1 | (Russia) Ruslan Avleev (2) | (Russia) Ural Great | 42 |
| 2 | (United States) Alphonso Ford | (Greece) Olympiacos | 29 |
| 3 | (Turkey) Memo Okur | (Turkey) Efes Pilsen | 36 |
| 4 | (Slovenia) Matjaž Smodiš | (Italy) Kinder Bologna | 38 |
| 5 | (United States) Marcus Brown | (Turkey) Efes Pilsen | 41 |
| 6 | (Turkey) Mirsad Türkcan (4) | (Russia) CSKA Moscow | 34 |

== Individual statistics ==
=== Rating ===
| Rank | Name | Team | Games | Rating | PIR |
|---|---|---|---|---|---|
| 1. | (Turkey) Mirsad Türkcan | (Russia) CSKA Moscow | 17 | 439 | 25.82 |
| 2. | (United States) Joseph Blair | (Italy) Scavolini Pesaro | 14 | 352 | 25.14 |
| 3. | (Croatia) Mate Skelin | (Slovenia) Krka | 14 | 351 | 25.07 |

=== Points ===
| Rank | Name | Team | Games | Points | PPG |
|---|---|---|---|---|---|
| 1. | (United States) Alphonso Ford | (Greece) Olympiacos | 20 | 495 | 24.75 |
| 2. | (Croatia) Gordan Giriček | (Russia) CSKA Moscow | 18 | 413 | 22.94 |
| 3. | (Slovenia) Jaka Lakovič | (Slovenia) Krka | 14 | 293 | 20.93 |

=== Rebounds ===
| Rank | Name | Team | Games | Rebounds | RPG |
|---|---|---|---|---|---|
| 1. | (Turkey) Mirsad Türkcan | (Russia) CSKA Moscow | 17 | 217 | 12.76 |
| 2. | (United States) Joseph Blair | (Italy) Scavolini Pesaro | 14 | 167 | 11.93 |
| 3. | (Croatia) Mate Skelin | (Slovenia) Krka | 14 | 137 | 9.79 |

=== Assists ===
| Rank | Name | Team | Games | Assists | APG |
|---|---|---|---|---|---|
| 1. | (United States) Elmer Bennett | (Spain) Tau Cerámica | 15 | 79 | 5.27 |
| 2. | (United States) Michael Hawkins | (Poland) Idea Śląsk | 14 | 70 | 5.00 |
| 3. | (United States) John Celestand | (France) ASVEL | 13 | 62 | 4.77 |

=== Other statistics ===
| Category | Player | Team | Games | Average |
|---|---|---|---|---|
| Steals | (Argentina) Manu Ginóbili | (Italy) Kinder Bologna | 22 | 2.55 |
| Blocks | (Ukraine) Grigorij Khizhnyak | (Lithuania) Žalgiris | 14 | 3.21 |
| Turnovers | (United States) Michael Hawkins | (Poland) Idea Śląsk | 14 | 3.71 |
| Fouls drawn | (England) Roger Huggins | (Belgium) Spirou | 14 | 7.14 |
| Minutes | (United States) Ralph Biggs | (Belgium) Telindus Oostende | 14 | 36:46 |
| 2P% | (Greece) Giannis Giannoulis | (Greece) Panathinaikos | 15 | 82.5% |
| 3P% | (Federal Republic of Yugoslavia) Nenad Čanak | (Federal Republic of Yugoslavia) Partizan | 14 | 56.1% |
| FT% | (Russia) Sergei Chikalkin | (Italy) Benetton Treviso | 21 | 91.7% |

=== Individual game highs ===
| Category | Player | Team | Statistic |
|---|---|---|---|
| PIR | (Slovenia) Jaka Lakovič | (Slovenia) Krka | 55 |
| Points | (Federal Republic of Yugoslavia) Vlado Šćepanović | (Federal Republic of Yugoslavia) Partizan | 40 |
| Rebounds | (Turkey) Mirsad Türkcan | (Russia) CSKA Moscow | 23 |
| Assists | (United States) John Celestand | (France) ASVEL | 12 |
| Steals | (Spain) Jorge Garbajosa | (Italy) Benetton Treviso | 7 |
| Blocks | (Ukraine) Grigorij Khizhnyak | (Lithuania) Žalgiris | 7 |
| Three-pointers | (Argentina) Marcelo Nicola | (Italy) Benetton Treviso | 7 |
| Three-pointers | (Spain) Alberto Herreros | (Spain) Real Madrid | 7 |
| Three-pointers | (Federal Republic of Yugoslavia) Vlado Šćepanović | (Federal Republic of Yugoslavia) Partizan | 7 |
| Turnovers | (Germany) Pascal Roller | (Germany) Opel Skyliners | 8 |
| Turnovers | (Slovenia) Jaka Lakovič | (Slovenia) Krka | 8 |
| Turnovers | (Federal Republic of Yugoslavia) Sasha Đjorđjević | (Spain) Real Madrid | 8 |
| Turnovers | (Turkey) Mirsad Türkcan | (Russia) CSKA Moscow | 8 |

== See also ==
- 2001–02 FIBA Saporta Cup
- 2001–02 FIBA Korać Cup

== Sources ==
- 2001-02 at Eurobasket.com
- Awards
