= Ivan Lazarev (basketball) =

Russian basketball player

Personal information
- Born: January 31, 1991 (age 35) Orekhovo-Zuyevo, Moscow Region, Russia
- Listed height: 6 ft 10.75 in (2.10 m)
- Listed weight: 232 lb (105 kg)

Career information
- NBA draft: 2013: undrafted
- Playing career: 2009–present
- Position: Power forward / center

Career history
- 2009–2012: Dynamo Moscow
- 2012–2014: Triumph Lyubertsy
- 2014: Zenit Saint Petersburg
- 2014–2015: BC Ryazan
- 2015–2017: CSKA Moscow
- 2017–2018: Zenit Saint Petersburg
- 2018–2019: Parma
- 2019–2020: Runa
- 2022: MBA
- 2022: UNICS
- 2022–2023: BC Samara
- 2023–2024: UNICS

Career highlights
- EuroLeague champion (2016); 2× VTB United League champion (2016, 2017)

Ivan Vladimirovich Lazarev (Russian: Иван Владимирович Лазарев; born January 31, 1991) is a Russian professional basketball. He is a 2.10 m (6'10¾") tall power forward-center.

== Professional career ==
After playing with the youth clubs of Dynamo Moscow and Dynamo Moscow's 2nd team (Dynamo Moscow 2), Lazarev has played professionally with the Russian clubs Triumph Lyubertsy, Zenit Saint Petersburg, BC Ryazan, CSKA Moscow, Parma, Runa]], BC MBA, and UNICS.

On July 15, 2022, he has signed with BC Samara of the VTB United League.

== National team career ==
Lazarev was a member of the junior national teams of Russia. With Russia's junior national teams, he played at the 2009 FIBA Europe Under-18 Championship.

== Career statistics ==
Legend
GP	Games played	GS	Games started	MPG	Minutes per game
FG%	Field-goal percentage	3P%	3-point field-goal percentage	FT%	Free-throw percentage
RPG	Rebounds per game	APG	Assists per game	SPG	Steals per game
BPG	Blocks per game	PPG	Points per game	PIR	Performance index rating
**Bold**	Career high

=== EuroLeague ===
†	Denotes seasons in which Lazarev won the EuroLeague

Year	Team	GP	GS	MPG	FG%	3P%	FT%	RPG	APG	SPG	BPG	PPG	PIR
2015–16†	CSKA Moscow	9	6	4.4	.600	—	.250	.8	—	—	.1	1.4	-0.3
Career		9	6	4.4	.600	—	.250	.8	—	—	.1	1.4	-0.3
