= Italian Basketball Hall of Fame =

- Established: 2006
- Location: Bologna, Italy
- Type: Hall of Fame
- Website: Official website

The Italian Basketball Hall of Fame (Italian: Italia Basket Hall of Fame, IBHOF) is a hall of fame that honours individuals (or whole teams) that have contributed to the spread and improvement of Italian basketball, through their sporting contributions, their behaviour and their actions in support of the game in Italy.

The Italian Basketball Federation has inducted a class every year since 2007 (counting for the previous year) with an official ceremony that crowns athletes (male and female), coaches, referees or other figureheads who have contributed to Italian basketball, with a maximum of seven inductees per year (teams exempted). Those also in the Naismith Hall of Fame or the FIBA Hall of Fame are not limited in number, in addition, two individuals who are deceased at most can also be inducted in memoriam yearly.

== History ==
The Hall of Fame was established by the Italian Basketball Federation (FIP) on 16 September 2006, with the first class (that of 2006) inducted on 11 February 2007 in Bologna. Sandro Riminucci, who broke a LBA record with 77 points in 1963, Sandro Gamba, who had a hand in defeating the Soviet Union national basketball team at the 1980 Olympics, Dado Lombardi and Paolo Vittori were honoured, as well as Cesare Rubini (a Naismith Hall of Fame member like Gamba) and Dino Meneghin (in both the Naismith and FIBA Hall of Fame).

The 2008 class, inducted in Bologna on 22 February 2009, saw former Virtus Bologna head coach Ettore Messina amongst the inductees.

The 2014 class, inducted in Rome on 23 March 2015, had a number of former Pallacanestro Varese members; Antonio Bulgheroni was crowned for his career both as Varese player (winning three LBA titles) and president (adding the 1999 title to become the only person to have won both as player and president), whilst Marino Zanatta and Fabrizio Della Fiori were honoured for their playing contributions to their clubs and the senior Italian national basketball team.

== Inductees ==
=== Athletes ===
The honour is bestowed on athletes that have distinguished themselves on the domestic or international front, with either a minimum of 50 or 30 national team caps to respectively the men's national team and the women's national team, an Italian domestic first division (LBA) title, a European-wide cup title, or a medal at the senior EuroBasket, FIBA World Cup, or Summer Olympic Games. They have to have stopped playing for at least five years prior to the nomination.

Male	Female
Class of 2006
Gianfranco Lombardi	-
Dino Meneghin (N, F)	-
Sandro Riminucci	-
Paolo Vittori	-
Class of 2007
Pierlo Marzorati (F)	Mabel Bocchi
Gianfranco Pieri	-
Class of 2008
Ottorino Flaborea	Nidia Pausich
Aldo Ossola	-
Class of 2009
Giuseppe Brumatti	Nicoletta Persi
Giovanni Gavagnin	-
Giulio Iellini	-
Class of 2010
Massimo Masini	Lidia Gorlin
Class of 2011
Gabriele Vianello	Rosetta Bozzolo
Sauro Bufalini	-
Class of 2012
Renzo Bariviera	Wanda Sandon
Franco Bertini	-
Class of 2013
Carlo Caglieris	Catarina Pollini
Renato Villalta	-
Class of 2014
Fabrizio Della Fiori	Mara Fullin
Marino Zanatta	-
Class of 2015
Ivan Bisson	Bianca Rossi
Class of 2016
Massimo Cosmelli	-
Enrico Gilardi	-
Romeo Sacchetti	-
Class of 2017
Oscar Schmidt	-
Class of 2023
Bob Morse	-

=== Head coaches ===
The honour is bestowed to head coaches who have distinguished themselves at home or abroad, winning either a medal at the senior EuroBasket, FIBA World Cup, or Olympic Summer Games, a European-wide club competition, or the Italian first division title (LBA) with either men's or women's teams and clubs. They have to be at least 65 years old at their nomination, and possess a national coaching license. Only one can be designated per year.

Class of 2006
Sandro Gamba (N)
Cesare Rubini (N, F)
Class of 2007
Carlo Recalcati
Class of 2008
Ettore Messina
Class of 2009
Arnaldo Taurisano
Class of 2010
Tonino Zorzi
Class of 2011
Giuseppe Guerrieri
Class of 2012
Dan Peterson
Class of 2013
Valerio Bianchini
Class of 2014
Gianni Asti
Class of 2015
Alberto Bucci
Class of 2016
Bogdan Tanjević

=== Teams ===
The honor can be bestowed to an Italian basketball club that has won Italian first division (LBA) titles or European-wide cups, and who has through its actions and results, been judged to have been memorable to basketball followers.

If the club is defunct, the prize can be received by a representative former member. It can also be awarded to an Italian national team (men's or women's), that has won a medal in a EuroBasket, FIBA World Cup, or Summer Olympic Games.

Class of 2011
Italy national men's team at the 1980 Summer Olympic Games, in Moscow - Silver
Players
Fabrizio Della Fiori	Marco Solfrini	Marco Bonamico	Dino Meneghin	Renato Villalta	Renzo Vecchiato
Pierlo Marzorati	Pietro Generali	Romeo Sacchetti	Roberto Brunamonti	Michael Sylvester	Enrico Gilardi
Head coach Sandro Gamba	Assistant coach Riccardo Sales	Doctor; Dima Ferrantelli	Physio; Sandro Galleani	Team manager Massimo Blasetti	Delegation Head; Cesare Rubini
Class of 2013
Italy national men's team at the 1983 EuroBasket, in France - Gold
Players
Carlo Caglieris	Alberto Tonut	Marco Bonamico	Enrico Gilardi	Ario Costa	Roberto Brunamonti
Renato Villalta	Dino Meneghin	Antonello Riva	Renzo Vecchiato	Pierlo Marzorati	Romeo Sacchetti
Head coach Sandro Gamba	Assistant coaches Riccardo Sales / Santi Puglisi	Doctor; Dima Ferrantelli	Physio; Sandro Galleani	Team Managers; Massimo Blasetti / Duilio De Gobbis (assistant)	Delegation Head; Cesare Rubini
Class of 2015
Grande Ignis 1970–1979
Class of 2016
Olimpia Milano

=== Referees ===
The honour can be bestowed to referees who have distinguished themselves, at home or abroad, that have officiated for at least 10 years. They must have participated in at least a senior level EuroBasket, FIBA World Cup, Summer Olympic Games, or a European-wide cup final for clubs, for either men or women. The awardee must have stopped officiating for at least five years, prior to the award. Only one can be designated per year.

Class of 2007
Aldo Albanesi
Class of 2008
Giancarlo Vitolo
Class of 2009
Vittorio Paolo Fiorito
Class of 2010
Ninì Ardito
Class of 2011
Bruno Duranti
Class of 2012
Stefano Cazzaro

=== Contributors ("a life for basketball") ===
The "a life for basketball" honour (Italian: premio "una vita per il basket"), is awarded to those who have contributed significantly to the development of Italian basketball, be it domestically or internationally. They receive recognition for their actions in either Italian or international sports organisations. Any contributor who has been involved in Italian basketball, for at least twenty years, can be designated. There is a single designation per year, unless otherwise warranted by special circumstances.

Class of 2007
Claudio Coccia
Gianluigi Porelli
Class of 2008
Aldo Vitale
Class of 2009
Gianni Corsolini
Class of 2010
Amedeo Salerno
Class of 2011
Valter Scavolini
Class of 2012
Gilberto Benetton
Class of 2013
Alessandro Galleani
Class of 2014
Antonio Bulgheroni
Raffaele Morbelli
Class of 2015
Achille Canna

=== In memoriam ===
The Italian Basketball Hall of Fame, can also honour deceased individuals, who have contributed significantly to the development of Italian basketball, be it domestically or internationally. A single awardee can be chosen each year, and nominations aren't accepted. The Italian Basketball Federation chooses the individual honoured in memoriam itself.

Class of 2007
Aldo Giordani
Enrico Vinci
Class of 2008
Nello Paratore
Giancarlo Primo
Class of 2009
Adolfo Bogoncelli
Vittorio Tracuzzi
Class of 2010
Maurizio Martolini
Sergio Stefanini
Class of 2011
Aldo Allievi
Giovanni Maggiò
Emilio Tricerri
Class of 2012
Gianfranco Benvenuti
Class of 2013
Gino Burcovich
Class of 2014
Diego Pini

== See also ==
- College Basketball Hall of Fame
- Basketball Hall of Fame
  - List of members of the Naismith Memorial Basketball Hall of Fame
  - List of players in the Naismith Memorial Basketball Hall of Fame
  - List of coaches in the Naismith Memorial Basketball Hall of Fame
- FIBA Hall of Fame
  - List of members of the FIBA Hall of Fame
- EuroLeague Hall of Fame
- Greek Basket League Hall of Fame
- French Basketball Hall of Fame
- VTB United League Hall of Fame
- Finnish Basketball Hall of Fame
- Australian Basketball Hall of Fame
- Philippine Basketball Association Hall of Fame
- Women's Basketball Hall of Fame
