= Jordi Bertomeu =

Spanish basketball administrator

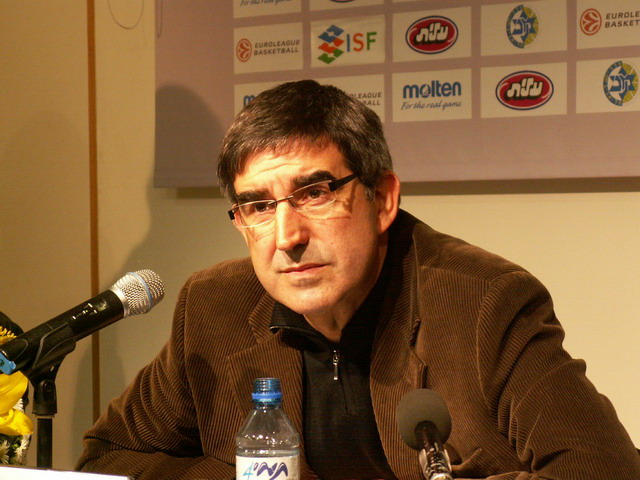

President of Euroleague Basketball
- In office 2011 – June 2022
- Preceded by: Position established
- Succeeded by: Dejan Bodiroga

CEO of Euroleague Basketball
- In office 2000 – June 2022
- Preceded by: Position established
- Succeeded by: Marshall Glickman (acting)

Personal details
- Born: Jordi Bertomeu Orteu; 15 January 1959 (age 67) Barcelona, Catalonia, Spain
- Education: University of Barcelona (LLB)
- Occupation: Sports administrator

Jordi Bertomeu Orteu (born 15 January 1959) is a Spanish basketball administrator. He led Euroleague Basketball, the company that organises the EuroLeague and EuroCup, from its creation in 2000 until 2022, serving as its chief executive officer and, from 2011, also as its president.

== Early life and education ==
Bertomeu was born in Barcelona on 15 January 1959. He graduated in law from the University of Barcelona.

== Career ==
=== ACB ===
From 1982 to 1994, Bertomeu was general counsel and general secretary of the Asociación de Clubs de Baloncesto (ACB), the body that organises the Liga ACB, the top tier of Spanish basketball. From 1994 to 2000 he was vice president of the ACB.

=== Euroleague Basketball ===
In 2000, Bertomeu was appointed CEO of the newly created Euroleague Basketball, which took over the organisation of Europe's top club competition from FIBA that year. He became chairman of the board in 2009 and president in 2011, while remaining CEO. During his tenure the EuroLeague moved from open qualification towards a semi-closed league based on long-term licences for leading clubs, a model that brought Euroleague Basketball into a prolonged conflict with FIBA over the international calendar and the control of European club competitions.

In November 2021, 11 of the shareholder clubs voted to dismiss Bertomeu as CEO, and it was confirmed that he would leave the company at the end of the 2021–22 season. He stepped down in June 2022. The roles he had combined were then split: former player Dejan Bodiroga was named president of Euroleague Basketball in September 2022, and Marshall Glickman became acting CEO.

== Honours ==
On 25 November 2008, the government of Lithuania awarded Bertomeu the Order for Merits to Lithuania for his contribution to the development and promotion of sport in the country.

Sporting positions
New office	CEO of Euroleague Basketball; 2000–2022	Succeeded by Marshall Glickman as Acting CEO
New office	President of Euroleague Basketball; 2011–2022	Succeeded by Dejan Bodiroga
