= 2002 Euroleague Final Four =

Basketball tournament

- Season: 2001–02 Euroleague

Tournament details
- Arena: PalaMalaguti; Bologna, Italy
- Dates: 3–5 May 2002

Final positions
- Champions: (Greece) Panathinaikos (3rd title)
- Runners-up: (Italy) Kinder Bologna

Awards and statistics
- MVP: (Serbia and Montenegro) Dejan Bodiroga

The 2002 Euroleague Final Four was the concluding Euroleague Final Four tournament of the 2001–02 Euroleague season. The event was hosted form 3 till 5 May 2002, and all games were played at the PalaMalaguti, in Bologna.

It is the only EuroLeague Final Four game without the third place game. The Third place game was included from 2003 until 2025, which the third place game was excluded for the second time in the EuroLeague History from the final four in 2026.

== Bracket ==
Semi-finals
May 3, 2002
(Italy) Benetton Treviso	82
(Italy) Kinder Bologna	90
May 3, 2002
(Greece) Panathinaikos	83
(Israel) Maccabi Elite	75

Final
May 5, 2002
(Italy) Kinder Bologna	83
(Greece) Panathinaikos	89

== Semifinals ==
3 May 2002
18:00

Report

Panathinaikos (Greece)	83–75	(Israel) Maccabi Elite
Scoring by quarter: 27–23, 17–21, 18–13, 21–18
Pts: Bodiroga 26; Rebs: Bodiroga 9 Asts: Kalaitzis 5		Pts: Burstein 18; Rebs: Huffman 10; Asts: Burstein 5

PalaMalaguti, Bologna
Attendance: 8,278
Referees: Brazauskas (LTU), Arteaga (ESP), Lamonica (ITA)

3 May 2002
21:00

Report

Benetton Treviso (Italy)	82–90	(Italy) Kinder Bologna
Scoring by quarter: 26–23, 15–16, 22–24, 19–27
Pts: Bell, Edney 19; Rebs: Marconato 8 Asts: Nachbar 2		Pts: Jarić 15; Rebs: Ginóbili 8 Asts: Ginóbili, Jarić 3

PalaMalaguti, Bologna
Attendance: 8,278
Referees: Betancor (ESP), Tsanidis (GRE), Coelho (POR)

== Final ==
5 May 2002
20:30

Report

Kinder Bologna (Italy)	83–89	(Greece) Panathinaikos
Scoring by quarter: 23–23, 25–17, 13–24, 22–25
Pts: Ginóbili 27; Rebs: Jarić 7 Asts: Jarić 5		Pts: Kutluay 22; Rebs: Bodiroga 7 Asts: Bodiroga 4

PalaMalaguti, Bologna
Attendance: 8,278
Referees: Betancor (ESP), Arteaga (ESP), Brazauskas (LTU)

Kinder Bologna	Panathinaikos

Starters:			P	R	A
PG	14	(France) Antoine Rigaudeau (C)	3	1	0
SG	6	(Argentina) Manu Ginóbili	27	5	2
SF	20	(Federal Republic of Yugoslavia) Marko Jarić	11	7	5
PF	18	(Slovenia) Matjaž Smodiš	23	6	0
C	15	(United States) Rashard Griffith	2	3	2
Reserves:			P	R	A
SF	10	(Slovenia) Sani Bečirović	4	2	3
SG	11	(United States) Antonio Granger	10	1	0
PF	12	(Italy) Alessandro Frosini	0	1	0
PF	13	(Australia) David Andersen	3	2	0
Head coach:
(Italy) Ettore Messina

2001–02 Euroleague
Champions

Panathinaikos
3rd title

Starters:			P	R	A
PG	8	(Croatia) Damir Mulaomerović	6	2	2
SG	10	(Federal Republic of Yugoslavia) Dejan Bodiroga	21	7	4
SF	12	(Turkey) İbrahim Kutluay	22	5	0
PF	4	(Greece) Fragiskos Alvertis (C)	11	3	0
C	11	(United States) Darryl Middleton	10	2	0
Reserves:			P	R	A
PG	5	(Greece) Georgios Kalaitzis	0	3	1
C	7	(Spain) Johnny Rogers	7	2	0
PF	14	(Greece) Lazaros Papadopoulos	12	5	0
PG	16	(Argentina) Pepe Sánchez	0	0	0
Head coach:
(Federal Republic of Yugoslavia) Željko Obradović

== Awards ==
=== Euroleague Final Four MVP ===
- (Federal Republic of Yugoslavia) Dejan Bodiroga ( (Greece) Panathinaikos)

=== Euroleague Finals Top Scorer ===
- (Argentina) Manu Ginóbili ( (Italy) Kinder Bologna)
