= Vittorio Paolo Fiorito =

Italian basketball referee

- Born: 26 April 1941; Rome, Italy
- Died: 27 May 2015 (aged 74); Rome, Italy
- Occupation: Referee

Vittorio Paolo Fiorito (26 April 1941 - 27 May 2015) was an Italian basketball referee.

He was a referee in Serie A for 22 years from 1969 to 1991, for a total of 583 matches. He was also designated in 11 championship finals.

He was a referee at the 1984 Summer Olympics in Los Angeles, at the 1986 FIBA World Championship, at three editions of the European Championships (1987, 1989, 1991) and at one of the European Women Championship (1974).

In 2009 he was inducted in the Italian Basketball Hall of Fame.
