= 2000–01 Turkish Basketball League =

Basketball league in Turkey

Turkish Basketball League
- Season: 2000–01

Regular season
- Relegated: Antbirlik; Ege Pen Altay

Finals
- Champions: Ülker (3rd title)
- Runners-up: Efes Pilsen

Statistical leaders
Points	Bud Eley	23.9
Rebounds	Tanoka Beard	13.1
Assists	Damir Mršić	7.8

The 2000–01 Turkish Basketball League was the 35th season of the top-tier professional basketball league in Turkey. The season started on October 14, 2000. Ülkerspor won their third national championship this season.

== Regular season ==
=== League table ===
Pos	Team	Pld	W	L	Qualification or relegation
1	Ülker	26	22	4	Qualification to quarterfinals
2	Efes Pilsen	26	22	4	Qualification to quarterfinals
3	Darüşşafaka	26	20	6	Qualification to quarterfinals
4	Türk Telekom	26	20	6	Qualification to quarterfinals
5	Fenerbahçe	26	18	8	Qualification to quarterfinals
6	Tuborg Pilsener	26	14	12	Qualification to quarterfinals
7	Beşiktaş	26	13	13	Qualification to first round
8	Galatasaray	26	11	15	Qualification to first round
9	Büyük Kolej	26	10	16	Qualification to first round
10	Pınar Karşıyaka	26	10	16	Qualification to first round
11	Mydonose Kolejliler	26	8	18	
12	Konyaspor	26	8	18	
13	Antbirlik	26	4	22	Relegated to Turkish First League
14	Ege Pen Altay	26	2	24	Relegated to Turkish First League

Source: TBLStat.net

== Turkish Basketball League 2001/2002 play-offs ==
as of June 4, 2002

The 2002 Beko Basketball League play-offs is the final phase of the 2001–2002 regular season.

First round, Quarterfinal and Semifinal series are 5-match series. The teams reaches the first 3 wins is through to the next round. The team which has won both regular season matchups starts with a 1–0 lead to the series. If teams split up the regular season meetings, series starts with a 1–1 draw.

Final series are 7-match series and the team reaches first 4 wins is the champion of the Turkish Basketball League.

1.Round
8	Galatasaray	3
9	Büyük Kolej	1
7	Beşiktaş	3
10	Pınar Karşıyaka	1

Quarter Finals
1	Ülkerspor	3
8	Galatasaray	2
4	Türk Telekom	3
5	Fenerbahçe	2
3	Darüşşafaka	3
6	Tuborg Pilsener	0
2	Efes Pilsen	3
7	Beşiktaş	0

Semi-Finals
1	Ülkerspor	3
4	Türk Telekom	0
2	Efes Pilsen	3
3	Darüşşafaka	1

Finals
1	Ülkerspor	4
2	Efes Pilsen	2
