= Vittorio Gallinari =

Italian basketball player and sports agent

Vittorio Gallinari (born 22 October 1958) is an Italian former professional basketball player and current sports agent. He is the father of Danilo Gallinari, a former professional basketball player who played in the NBA.

He was born in Sant'Angelo Lodigiano. During his playing career, Gallinari was known as a tough defensive player. He was also a teammate of former Houston Rockets coach Mike D'Antoni.

== Biography ==
He is the father and attorney of Danilo Gallinari, also a basketball player, who is currently unemployed.

A defensive specialist, much of his career was spent wearing the Olimpia Milano jersey, where he was a key player in winning many trophies in the Dan Peterson era, including the 1987 grand slam when the Milanese won the Champions Cup, Scudetto and Coppa Italia. The scudetti won will total four. He remained at Olimpia Milano until 1987, until he moved one season to Pallacanestro Pavia in Serie A2 and later to Virtus Bologna, helping to enrich his and the Virtus Bologna team's palmarès.

In the 1990s, he played for one season at Glaxo Verona. Then he moved on to Libertas Pallacanestro Livorno, a club that, however, went bankrupt two years later: his tag, still tied to the Tuscan club, was blocked for a year. When this period ended, he concluded his competitive career close to home, at Unione Cestistica Casalpusterlengo in the minor leagues.
