= Sandro Riminucci =

Italian basketball player

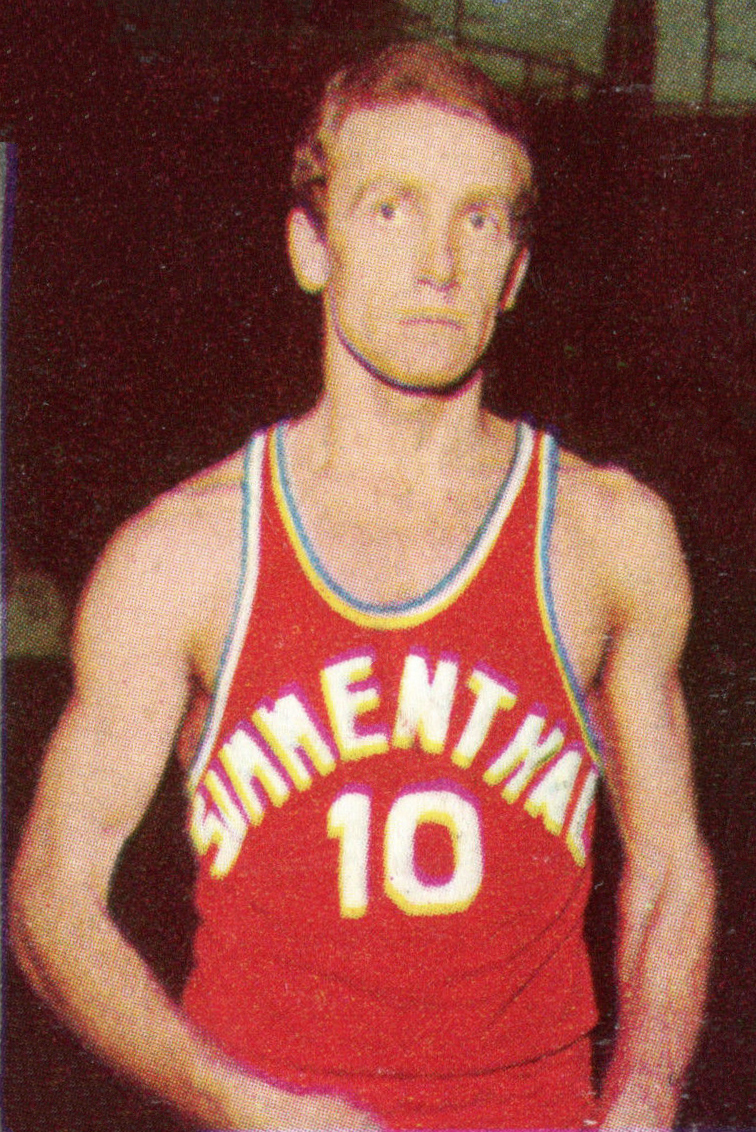
- Riminucci, in 1967.

Personal information
- Born: 26 June 1935 (age 91) Tavoleto, Italy
- Listed height: 6 ft 1.75 in (1.87 m)
- Listed weight: 180 lb (82 kg)

Career information
- Playing career: 1956–1970
- Position: Small forward

Career history
- Victoria Pesaro
- 1956–1970: Olimpia Milano

Career highlights
- EuroLeague champion (1966); FIBA European Selection (1964); 9× Italian League champion (1957–1960, 1962, 1963, 1965, 1966, 1967); Italian Basketball Hall of Fame (2006)

Alessandro "Sandro" Riminucci (born 26 June 1935) is a retired Italian professional basketball player. His nickname as a player, was "The Blonde Angel", due to his leaping ability. In 2006, he was inducted into the Italian Basketball Hall of Fame.

== Professional career ==
Riminucci was a member of the FIBA European Selection, in 1964.

== National team career ==
Riminucci was a part of the senior Italian national basketball team that finished in fourth place at the 1960 Summer Olympics.
