= Antonio Nava (basketball) =

Spanish basketball player

Personal information
- Full name: Antonio Nava Cano
- Nationality: Spanish
- Born: 5 July 1948 (age 76); Madrid, Spain

Sport
- Sport: Basketball

Antonio Nava Cano (born 5 July 1948) is a Spanish basketball player. He competed in the men's tournament at the 1968 Summer Olympics.
