= Enrico Gilardi =

Italian basketball player (born 1957)

Personal information
- Born: 20 January 1957 (age 69) Rome, Italy
- Listed height: 6 ft 4 in (1.93 m)
- Listed weight: 208 lb (94 kg)

Career information
- Playing career: 1975–1991
- Position: Shooting guard

Career history

Playing
- 1975–1976: SS Lazio Basket
- 1976–1981: Stella Azzurra Roma
- 1981–1987: Virtus Roma
- 1987–1988: Brescia
- 1988–1990: Virtus Roma
- 1990–1991: Napoli

Coaching
- 2018: Malta

Career highlights
- As a player: FIBA Intercontinental Cup champion (1984); EuroLeague champion (1984); FIBA Korać Cup champion (1986); Italian League champion (1983); Italian Basketball Hall of Fame (2016)
Medals
Men's basketball
Representing Italy
Olympic Games
Silver medal – second place	1980 Moscow
FIBA EuroBasket
Gold medal – first place	1983 France
Bronze medal – third place	1985 West Germany
Head coach
Representing Malta
FIBA Women's European Championship for Small Countries
Bronze medal – third place	2018 Ireland

Enrico Gilardi (born 20 January 1957) is a former professional basketball player and coach from Italy. He was born in Rome. During his playing career, he was nicknamed, "The Heart of Rome". He was inducted into the Italian Basketball Hall of Fame, in 2016.

== Professional career ==
Gilardi was the team captain of the Italian League club Virtus Roma. With Virtus Roma, he won the EuroLeague championship in 1984, as well as the 1984 edition of the FIBA Intercontinental Cup.

He is the leading scorer in the club history of Virtus Roma, with 3,393 total points scored. Gilardi ended his pro club career in 1991, with Filodoro Napoli being the last club that he played for.

== National team career ==
Gilardi won the silver medal with the senior Italian national team, at the 1980 Moscow Summer Olympics. With Italy, he also won the gold medal at the 1983 FIBA EuroBasket, and the bronze medal at the 1985 FIBA EuroBasket.

Gilardi also represented Italy at the following major FIBA tournaments: the 1979 FIBA EuroBasket, the 1980 FIBA European Olympic Qualifying Tournament, the 1981 FIBA EuroBasket, the 1984 Los Angeles Summer Olympic Games, and the 1986 FIBA World Cup.

== Coaching career ==
After he retired from his playing career, Gilardi became a basketball coach. He was the head coach of the Maltese women's national team at the 2018 FIBA Women's European Championship for Small Countries. He led Malta to the bronze medal at the tournament.
