= Vicente Paniagua =

Spanish basketball player (1947–2026)

Vicente Paniagua Logroño (17 May 1947 – 7 March 2026) was a Spanish basketball player.

== Biography ==
Paniagua was born on 17 May 1947. He played as a small forward for Real Madrid (1966–1977). He also played for the Spanish national team (1967–1977). He notably represented Spain at the 1967 Mediterranean Games.

Paniagua died on 7 March 2026, at the age of 78.
