= Juris Kalniņš =

Soviet and Latvian basketball player

Personal information
- Born: 8 March 1938 Riga, Latvia
- Died: 9 February 2010 (aged 71)
- Listed height: 185 cm (6 ft 1 in)
- Listed weight: 85 kg (187 lb)
- Position: Shooting guard / small forward
Medals
Men's basketball
Representing Soviet Union
Olympic Games
Silver medal – second place	1964 Tokyo	Men's basketball

Juris Kalniņš (8 March 1938 – 9 February 2010) was a Soviet and Latvian basketball player. He played as a shooting guard and small forward. Kalniņš won a silver medal at the 1964 Summer Olympics. He won a bronze medal at the 1963 World Champs and a gold at the 1963 European Champs.
