= Oļģerts Hehts =

Latvian basketball player

Oļģerts Hehts (30 December 1931 – 16 September 2016) was a Latvian basketball player.

He played for Rīgas ASK and won 3 Euroleague titles (1958, 1959, 1960) and 4 Soviet national championships (1955, 1956, 1957, 1958).
