= Johnny Rogers =

Spanish-American basketball player

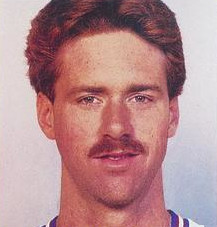
- Rogers, circa 1986

Personal information
- Born: December 30, 1963 (age 62) Fullerton, California, U.S.
- Listed height: 6 ft 10 in (2.08 m)
- Listed weight: 225 lb (102 kg)

Career information
- High school: La Quinta (Westminster, California)
- College: Stanford (1981–1983); UC Irvine (1984–1986)
- NBA draft: 1986: 2nd round, 34th overall pick
- Drafted by: Sacramento Kings
- Playing career: 1986–2004
- Position: Power forward
- Number: 32

Career history
- 1986–1987: Sacramento Kings
- 1987–1988: Cleveland Cavaliers
- 1988–1989: Real Madrid
- 1989–1991: Pamesa Valencia
- 1991–1992: Philips Milano
- 1992–1993: Cagiva Varese
- 1993–1994: Telemarket Forlì
- 1994–1995: Murcia
- 1995–1996: Cáceres
- 1996–1997: Pamesa Valencia
- 1997–1999: Olympiacos
- 1999–2002: Panathinaikos
- 2002–2004: Caprabo Lleida

Career highlights
- 2× EuroLeague champion (2000, 2002); FIBA Saporta Cup champion (1989); Spanish Cup winner (1989); 2× Greek League champion (2000, 2001); Greek League All-Star (1999); 101 Greats of European Basketball (2018); Pac-10 Freshman of the Year (1982); Third-team Parade All-American (1981)
- Stats at NBA.com
- Stats at Basketball Reference

John Bernard Rogers Bakker (born December 30, 1963) is a Spanish-American former professional basketball player. Rogers played college basketball for the Stanford Cardinal and UC Irvine Anteaters. Listed at a height of 6'10" and 225 lbs., he played at the power forward position.

During his pro club career, Rogers won the EuroLeague championship twice, in 2000 and 2002. In 2018, he was named to the 101 Greats of European Basketball list.

== College career ==
Rogers played college basketball at Stanford University, with the Stanford Cardinal, from 1981 to 1983. After Stanford, he played college basketball at UC Irvine, with the UC Irvine Anteaters, from 1984 to 1986.

== Professional career ==
=== NBA ===
Rogers was selected with the 10th pick (34th overall) of the second round, in the 1986 NBA draft, by the Sacramento Kings. He played in the NBA for the Kings (1986–87), and the Cleveland Cavaliers (1987–88). He played in a total of 69 NBA games, in which he averaged 3.6 points and 1.5 rebounds per game, in 9.2 minutes per game of playing time.

=== Europe ===
Rogers also played professionally in Italy, with Philips Milano (Serie A1, 1991–92, which was coached by Mike D'Antoni), Cagiva Varese (Serie A2, 1992–93), and Telemarket Forlì (Serie A2, 1993–94).

He also played with both of the Greek giants, Olympiacos and Panathinaikos. With Panathinaikos, he won 2 EuroLeague championships (2000, 2002), and 2 Greek League championships (2000, 2001).

== National team career ==
During his time in Spain, Rogers acquired Spanish citizenship, and he subsequently played for the senior men's Spanish national team at the 2000 Summer Olympics.

== Post-playing career ==
After he retired from playing professional basketball, Rogers began a career in TV broadcasting, working for the EuroLeague, and EuroLeague TV.

== Career statistics ==
Legend
GP	Games played	GS	Games started	MPG	Minutes per game
FG%	Field goal percentage	3P%	3-point field goal percentage	FT%	Free throw percentage
RPG	Rebounds per game	APG	Assists per game	SPG	Steals per game
BPG	Blocks per game	PPG	Points per game	**Bold**	Career high

=== NBA ===
==== Regular season ====
Year	Team	GP	GS	MPG	FG%	3P%	FT%	RPG	APG	SPG	BPG	PPG
1986–87	Sacramento	**45**	**15**	**10.4**	**.486**	.000	.600	**1.7**	**.6**	**.2**	**.2**	**4.2**
1987–88	Cleveland	24	0	7.0	.426	.000	**.769**	1.1	.1	**.2**	.1	2.6
Career		69	15	9.2	.472	.000	.679	1.5	.4	.2	.2	3.6
