= Tanhum Cohen-Mintz =

Israeli basketball player (1939–2014)

Tanhum Cohen-Mintz תנחום כהן-מינץ
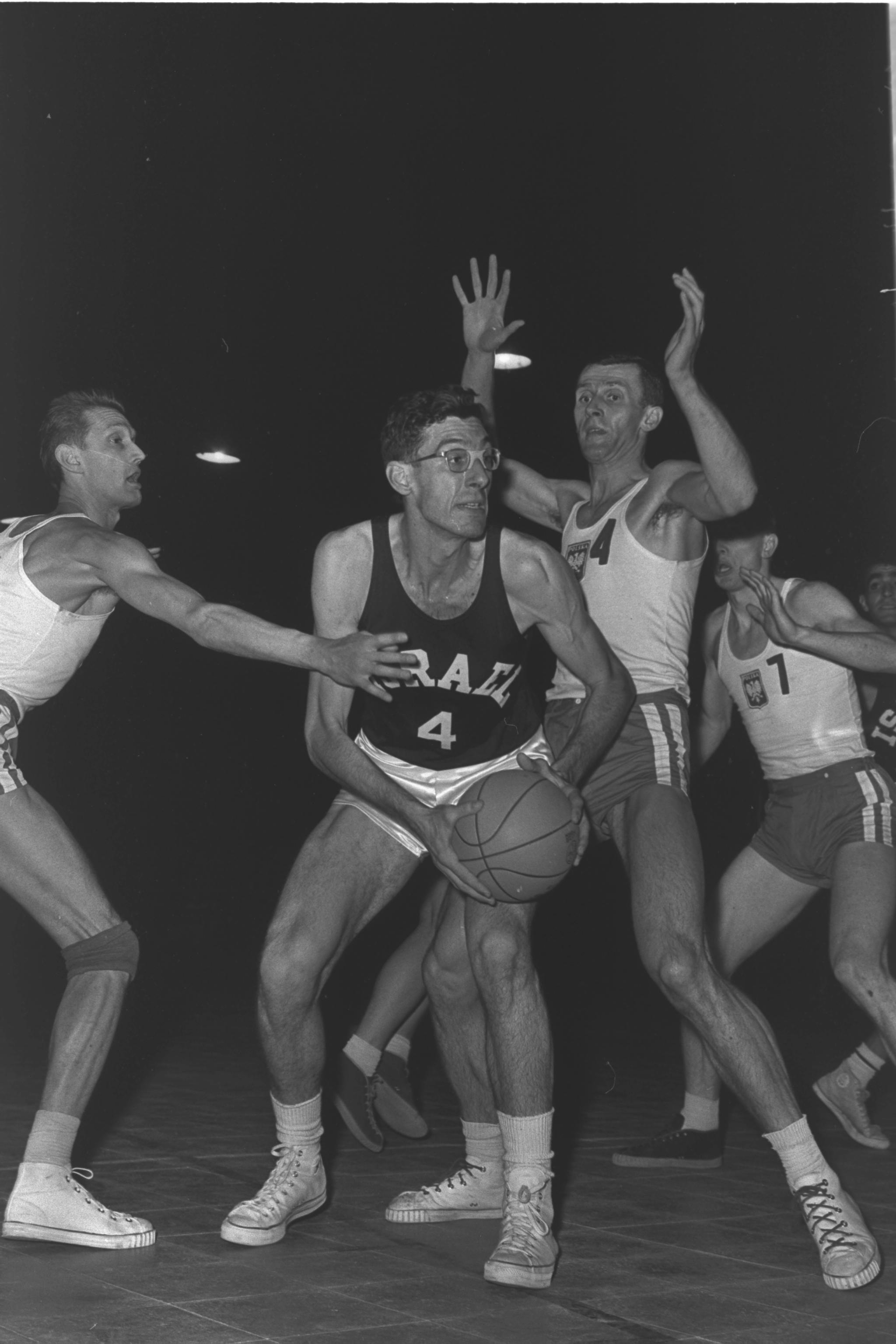
- Cohen-Mintz playing for Israel against Poland, 1962

Personal information
- Born: October 8, 1939 Riga, Latvia
- Died: October 11, 2014 (aged 75) Tel Aviv, Israel
- Listed height: 6 ft 8.5 in (2.04 m)
- Listed weight: 210 lb (95 kg)

Career information
- Playing career: 1956–1972
- Position: Center

Career history
- 1956–1972: Maccabi Tel Aviv

Career highlights
- 2× FIBA European Selection (1964, 1965); 9× Israeli League champion (1957–1959, 1962–1964, 1967, 1968, 1970); 9× Israeli Cup winner (1958, 1959, 1961–1966, 1970)
Medals
Men's basketball
Representing Israel
Asian Games
Gold medal – first place	1966 Thailand
Silver medal – second place	1970 Thailand

Tanhum Cohen-Mintz (Hebrew: תנחום "תני" כהן-מינץ; also "Tanchum or Tani" and "Cohen-Minz"; October 8, 1939 – October 11, 2014) was an Israeli professional basketball player. He was 6'8 1/2" (2.04 m ) tall, and he played at the center position.

== Early life ==
Cohen-Mintz, who was Jewish, was born in Riga, Latvia.

== Basketball career ==
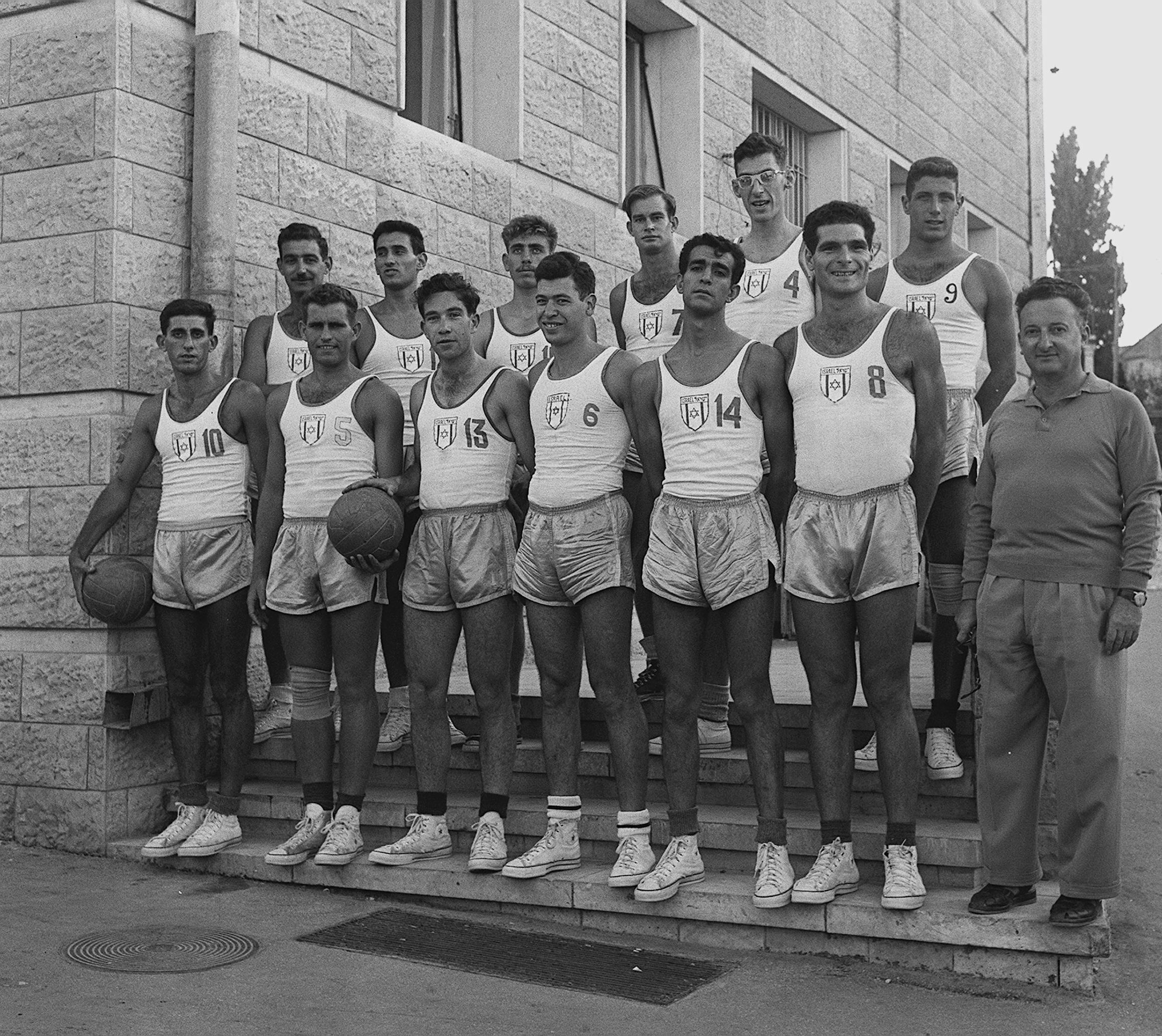
Cohen-Mintz (second row, second from the right), with the Israeli national basketball team, 1960

Cohen-Mintz started his sporting career in tennis, following the footsteps of his mother, Edith Cohen-Mintz, who was Israel's women's tennis champion for several years in the 1950s. He himself was Israel's junior tennis champion. He was viewed on the tennis court by legendary basketball coach Yehoshua Rozin, who was impressed by his height and athletic abilities. Rozin convinced Cohen-Mintz to take up basketball.

During his club basketball career, he played with Maccabi Tel Aviv. He was a starting-five member of the 1964 and 1965 FIBA European Selection All-Star Teams.

He also played with, and was the captain of the senior Israeli national basketball team, representing it 89 times, from 1958 to 1971, during which time he scored 1,076 points.

In 1961, he was selected as Israel's Sportsman of the Year. In 1998, Ma'ariv named him one of the five best basketball players in Israel's history.

== Hall of Fame ==
According to some sources, Tanhum Cohen Mintz is a member of the Jewish Sports Hall of Fame, having been inducted in 1992, but his name appears neither in the list of the International Jewish Sports Hall of Fame inductees nor in the list of the National Jewish Sports Hall of Fame inductees.

== Personal life ==
His son, Uri Cohen-Mintz, is also a former basketball player, and he also played for Israel's national team.

== Death ==
Cohen-Mintz died October 11, 2014, at the age of 75, of cancer.

== See also ==
- Israeli Premier League Statistical Leaders
