= Jim Boatwright =

American-Israeli basketball player and coach

Jim Boatwright ג'ים בואטרייט
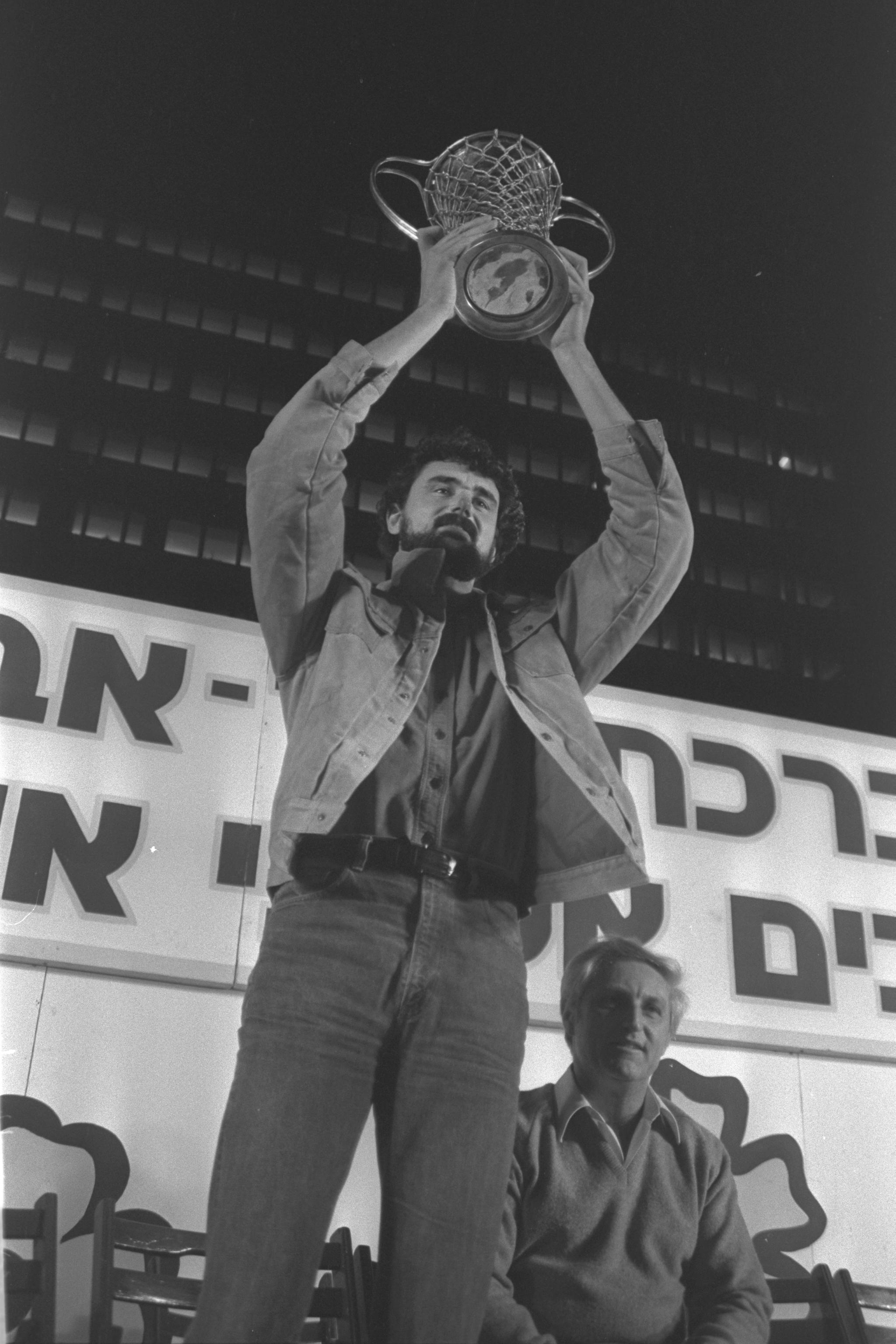
- Boatwright in 1981

Personal information
- Born: December 10, 1951 Twin Falls, Idaho, U.S.
- Died: February 11, 2013 (aged 61) Ketchum, Idaho, U.S.
- Listed height: 6 ft 7 in (2.01 m)
- Listed weight: 210 lb (95 kg)

Career information
- High school: Minico (Rupert, Idaho)
- College: Utah State (1971–1974)
- NBA draft: 1974: undrafted
- Playing career: 1974–1982
- Position: Small forward / power forward
- Number: 15
- Coaching career: 1983–2012

Career history

Playing
- 1974–1982: Maccabi Tel Aviv

Coaching
- 1989–1992: Utah State (assistant)
- 2003–2012: Wood River HS (assistant)

Career highlights
- As player: FIBA Intercontinental Cup champion (1980); 2× EuroLeague champion (1977, 1981); 6× Israeli League champion (1977–1982); 5× Israeli Cup winner (1977–1982)

James Earl Boatwright (Hebrew: ג'יימס ארל בווטרייט; December 10, 1951 – February 11, 2013) was an American-Israeli professional basketball player, basketball coach, and schoolteacher. He won two EuroLeague championships with Maccabi Tel Aviv, in 1977 and 1981, while reaching the EuroLeague Final another time in 1980. In the 1977 final, he led all scorers with 26 points.

== Amateur career ==
Boatwright graduated from Minico High School in Rupert, Idaho, in 1970, where he lettered in basketball, track and golf. He led the Spartans to back-to-back state championship games in 1969 and 1970. As a junior, he averaged 37 points per game during the state tournament. He still holds the record for most free throws taken and made. Boatwright is the second-leading Minico scorer, all time.

Having earned a slew of All-State and All-American honors, Boatwright received a scholarship to play at Utah State University. He was the leading scorer in both his junior and senior seasons at Logan, and was named Utah State's top athlete in 1974, the same year in which he graduated with a degree in political science.

== Professional career ==
Boatwright played for Maccabi Tel Aviv of the Israeli Basketball Super League, from 1974 to 1982. He began playing only in EuroLeague, until 1976, when he also started playing in the Israeli League. Maccabi won the EuroLeague championship in 1977, and Boatwright was the team's leading scorer. He converted to Judaism from Christianity in 1975, and became an Israeli citizen.

== National team career ==
Boatwright was selected as a member of the Israeli Olympic basketball team for the 1980 Moscow Summer Olympics. While playing for Maccabi, Boatwright had acquired Israeli citizenship. He was consequently able to participate in the EuroBasket 1981, as a member of the senior Israeli national team. At EuroBasket 1981, he averaged 9.6 points a game, and helped Israel finish in sixth place.

== Post-playing career ==
In 1983, Boatwright began teaching and coaching at Star Valley, Wyoming. He guided his team to the state championship, and was named Wyoming's "Coach of the Year." He later taught at elementary and secondary schools in Wyoming, Arizona, and California. In addition, Boatwright, a father of four, and married to Jennifer Magrane Boatwright, ran Snowline Basketball Camp across the Western US for 24 years.

In 2003, Boatwright became an assistant boys' basketball coach and history teacher at Wood River High School of Hailey, Idaho. He resigned in December 2012, to undergo chemotherapy.

== Personal life ==
Jim Boatwright was born in 1951 to William Boatwright who operated a service station in Twin Falls. Boatwright died on February 11, 2013, of liver cancer in Ketchum, Idaho.
