= Motti Aroesti =

Israeli basketball player and coach

Motti Aroesti מוטי ארואסטי
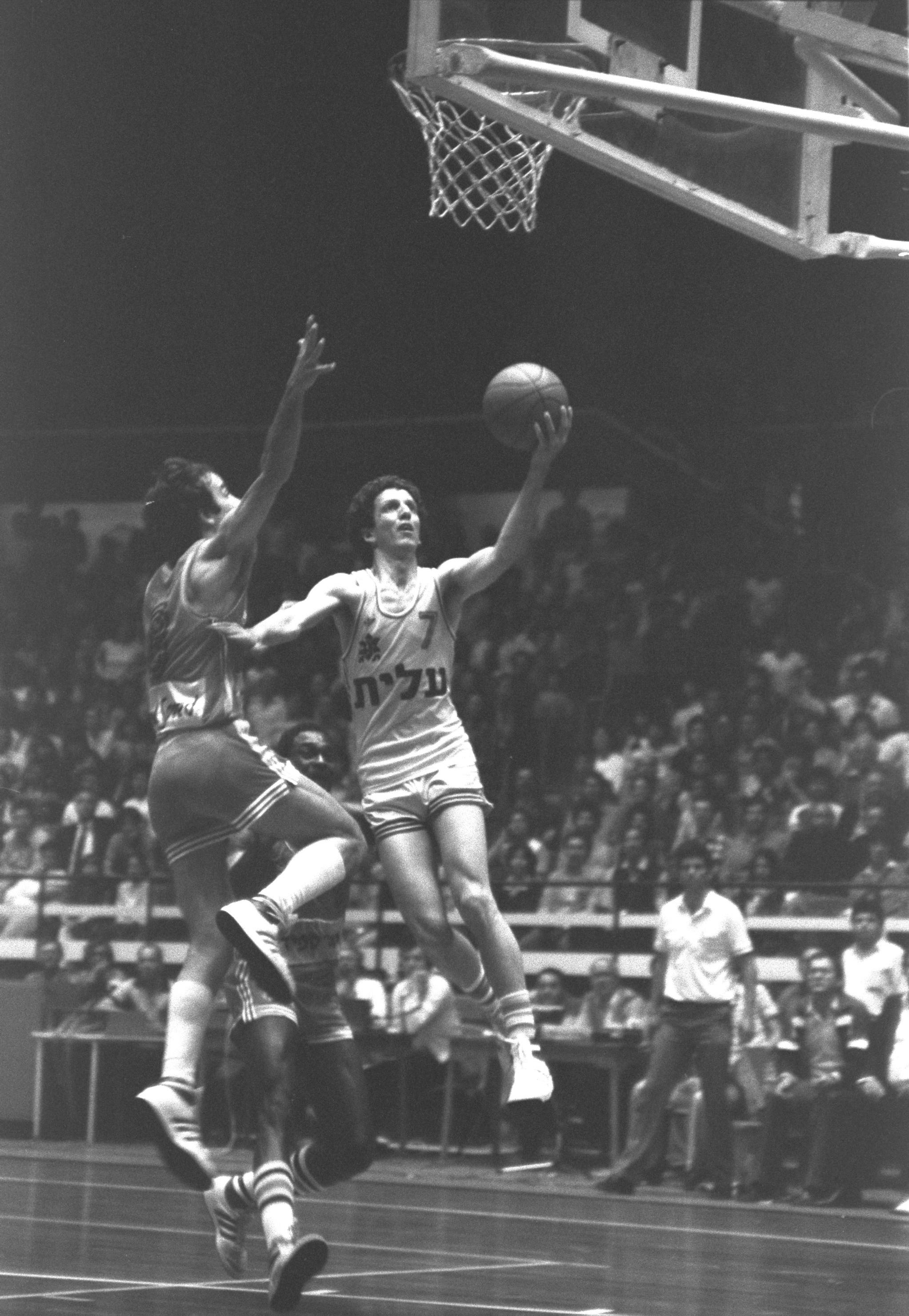
- Aroesti (right) at 1974 Asian Games in Tehran

Personal information
- Born: 11 July 1954 (age 72) Tel Aviv, Israel
- Listed height: 6 ft 2 in (1.88 m)

Career information
- NBA draft: 1976: undrafted
- Playing career: 1971–1991
- Position: Point guard
- Number: 7
- Coaching career: 1992–1996

Career history

Playing
- 1971–1973: Maccabi South Tel Aviv
- 1973–1988: Maccabi Tel Aviv
- 1990–1991: Maccabi Rishon LeZion

Coaching
- 1992–1993: Maccabi Tel Aviv (assistant)
- Maccabi Rehovot
- 1995–1996: Maccabi Givat Shmuel

Career highlights
- As player: FIBA Intercontinental Cup champion (1980); 2× EuroLeague champion (1977, 1981); 15× Israeli League champion (1974–1988); 11× Israeli Cup winner (1975, 1977–1983, 1985–1987)
Medals
Representing Israel
Men's basketball
FIBA EuroBasket
Silver medal – second place	1979 Italy
Asian Games
Gold medal – first place	1974 Iran

Motti Aroesti (Hebrew: מוטי ארואסטי; born 11 July 1954), is a retired Israeli professional basketball player and coach.

== Biography ==
Motti Aroesti was born in Givatayim.

=== Basketball career ===
Aroesti played club basketball with Maccabi Tel Aviv, from 1973 to 1988.

Aroesti wore the Maccabi jersey for 15 consecutive seasons, and won an Israeli League title for each of those years, as well as 11 Israeli State Cups. Aroesti helped Maccabi win its first FIBA Europe Champions Cup (EuroLeague) title in the 1976–77 season, and he was still the team's starting point guard when his team lifted its second top continental trophy in the 1980–81 season.

=== National team ===
As a member of the senior Israeli national basketball team, Aroesti played at the following major tournaments: the 1976 European Olympic Qualifying Tournament, 1979 EuroBasket, the 1980 European Olympic Qualifying Tournament, the 1983 EuroBasket, the 1984 European Olympic Qualifying Tournament, and the 1985 EuroBasket. He won the silver medal at the 1979 EuroBasket, while playing with the senior Israeli national team.

=== Coaching ===
After he retired from playing professional basketball, Aroesti became a basketball coach. He also worked as a sports director.

== See also ==
- Sports in Israel
