= Uri Cohen-Mintz =

Israeli basketball player

Uri Cohen-Mintz אורי כהן-מינץ
Personal information
- Born: August 1, 1973 (age 53)
- Listed height: 6 ft 10 in (2.08 m)
- Listed weight: 205 lb (93 kg)

Career information
- College: University of Connecticut
- Position: Forward

Uri Cohen-Mintz (Hebrew: אורי כהן-מינץ; born August 1, 1973) is an Israeli former basketball player. He played the forward position. He played in the Israeli Basketball Premier League, and competed for the Israeli national basketball team.

== Biography ==
Cohen-Mintz is 6 ft 10 in (208 cm) tall, weighs 205 pounds, and is Jewish. His father was Tanchum Cohen-Mintz, who played center for 16 seasons for Maccabi Tel Aviv, and his mother, Edith, was an Israeli tennis champion. He served three years in the Israel Defense Forces.

He attended the University of Connecticut. Cohen-Mintz played as a freshman for the UConn Huskies in the 1994–95 season. He left UConn after one year to play in Israel for Maccabi Jerusalem.

Cohen-Mintz played in the Israeli Basketball Premier League. He played for 11 Israeli teams in 11 seasons: Maccabi Tel Aviv, Hapoel Gvat, Maccabi Jerusalem, Ironi Ramat Gan, Bnei Herzelia, Hapoel Jerusalem, Ironi Ashkelon, Hapoel Tel Aviv, Hapoel Gilboa/Afula, and Hapoel Afula. Cohen-Mintz also played for Elan Chalon, in the LNB Pro A, from 2003 to 2006.

He competed for the Israeli national basketball team in the 1992 European Championship for Men '22 and Under', 1992 European Championship for Junior Men, 1993 World Championship for Men '22 and Under', 1994 European Championship for Men '22 and Under', 1997 European Championship for Men, 1999 European Championship for Men, 2001 European Championship for Men, and 2005 EuroBasket.

As of 2015, Cohen-Mintz was handling the business side of "Fine House," an events hall he ran in the northern Jezreel Valley region in Israel with his wife, Nili, a chef.
