= Yehoshua Rozin =

Israeli basketball coach

Yehoshua Rozin יהושע רוזין
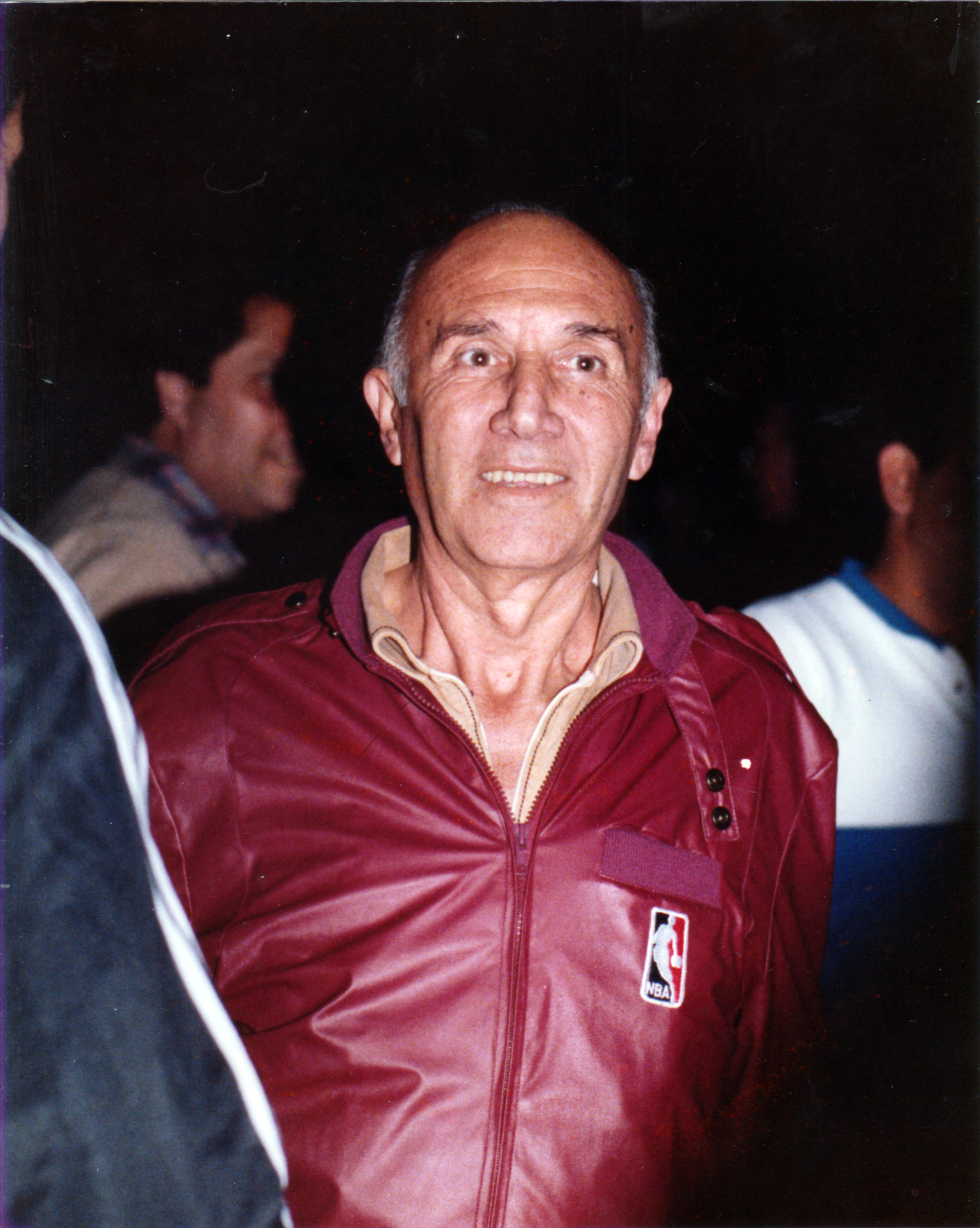
- Yehoshua Rozin

Personal information
- Nationality: Israel
- Born: 16 August 1918 Alexandria, Egypt
- Died: 6 February 2002 (aged 83) Israel
- Spouse: Yafa Katzurin

Sport
- Sport: Basketball
- Position: Coach
- Team: Maccabi Tel Aviv B.C.; Israel national basketball team; Hapoel Givat-Yagur; Hapoel Holon; Hapoel Givat Brenner; Elitzur Tel Aviv; Hapoel Haifa B.C.; Hapoel Jerusalem B.C.; Maccabi Ramat Gan; Hapoel Tel Aviv B.C.

Yehoshua Rozin (Hebrew: יהושע רוזין; 16 August 1918 – 6 February 2002) was an Israeli basketball coach.

== Biography ==
Rozin was born in Alexandria, Egypt. He moved to Israel at the age of six. He played basketball for Maccabi Tel Aviv in the 1930s and 1940s, beginning at the age of 14.

In 1948, he became the first coach of the Israel national basketball team. He led it to three European Tournament finals. Rozin was the first coach of the Maccabi Tel Aviv basketball team and coached it for 18 years, starting in 1953. During his career he also coached Hapoel Givat-Yagur, Hapoel Holon, Hapoel Givat Brenner, Elitzur Tel Aviv, Hapoel Haifa, Hapoel Jerusalem, Maccabi Ramat Gan, and Hapoel Tel Aviv.

In 1999, Rozin was awarded the Israel Prize for his contribution to sport. He died in 2002, at the age of 83.

He was married to Yafa Katzurin (1923-2007).

== Hall of Fame ==
He was Jewish, and in 1992 he was inducted into the Jewish Sports Hall of Fame.

== See also ==
- List of Israel Prize recipients
