= Maccabi Tel Aviv B.C. =

Basketball club in Israel

Maccabi Tel Aviv
- Nickname: Maccabi; The Yellows
- Leagues: Israeli Premier League; EuroLeague
- Founded: 1932; 94 years ago
- Arena: Menora Mivtachim Arena
- Capacity: 10,383
- Location: Tel Aviv, Israel
- Team colors: Yellow, Blue
- Main sponsor: Rapyd
- CEO: Avi Ben Tal
- President: Shimon Mizrahi
- General manager: Claudio Coldebella
- Head coach: Oded Kattash
- Team captain: John DiBartolomeo
- Ownership: Oudi Recanati (58%); Richard Deitz (17.5%); Shimon Mizrahi (14.5%); Ben Ashkenazy (10%)
- International titles: 6 EuroLeagues; 1 Intercontinental Cup
- Regional titles: 1 ABA League
- Domestic titles: 58 Israeli Championships; 47 Israeli State Cups; 12 Israeli League Cups
- Website: maccabi.co.il
Home	Away

Maccabi Tel Aviv Basketball Club (Hebrew: מועדון כדורסל מכבי תל אביב), known for sponsorship reasons as Maccabi Rapyd Tel Aviv (מכבי ראפיד תל אביב), is a professional basketball club based in Tel Aviv, Israel. The team plays in the Israeli Premier League and internationally in the EuroLeague. Maccabi Tel Aviv is known as one of the best teams in Europe, having won 6 Euroleague titles since joining, and having sent numerous players to the NBA draft.

The club was established in the mid-1930s, as part of the Maccabi Tel Aviv Sports Club, which had been founded in 1906.

With 6 EuroLeague championships (including the FIBA SuproLeague), one ABA League championship, 58 Israeli Basketball Premier League championships, 46 Israeli State Cup titles, and 11 Israeli League Cup titles, Maccabi has been the most successful basketball team in Israel. Players such as Tal Brody, Miki Berkovich, Jim Boatwright, Kevin Magee, Earl Williams, and Aulcie Perry; and more recently Derrick Sharp, Šarūnas Jasikevičius, Tal Burstein, Anthony Parker and Nikola Vujčić, have been among the elite of Europe's basketball players.

== History ==
The Israeli Basketball Super League started in 1954, and Maccabi Tel Aviv was the first champion. It has dominated the championship ever since, winning the title in 57 seasons, including 23 consecutive titles (1970 through 1992), losing to Hapoel Galil Elyon in 1993, and then continuing with 14 consecutive titles (1994 through 2007). The team has also won the Israeli Basketball State Cup overall 45 times.

From 1969 until 2008, Maccabi Tel Aviv was sponsored by Elite, Israel's largest food company, and carried its name. From July 2008 until 2015, Maccabi was sponsored by Electra Consumer Products. In 2015, they switched their sponsor to fashion chain Fox.

Since 1963, the club's home court has been the Yad Eliyahu Arena in Tel Aviv (later renamed "Menora Mivtachim Arena"). Originally an open-air court for 5,000 spectators, it is now a modern indoor arena with a capacity of 10,383.

Most Maccabi Tel Aviv head coaches have been former players of the club. Yehoshua Rozin was involved with the club for 40 years. Ralph Klein started as an 18-year-old player and later had five stints as a coach, leading the club to its first EuroLeague title in the 1977–78 season. Zvi Sherf played for Maccabi's second team, and coached the team in three stints. Pini Gershon played in the Youth department and, as a coach, led Maccabi to three EuroLeague titles: in 2001, 2004, and 2005.

Maccabi Tel Aviv has always provided the senior Israel national basketball team with a large number of players. Five Maccabi players, headed by Avraham Shneur, were on the team that represented Israel in its first EuroBasket, in 1953 in Moscow.

Tanhum Cohen-Mintz was one of Europe's top centers in the '60s, and was selected to the first FIBA European Selection European All-Star Team, which played in Madrid in 1964. Miki Berkowitz, Motty Aroesti, Lou Silver, and Eric Minkin played a major part in winning the silver medal at the 1979 EuroBasket in Torino. Doron Jamchi played 16 years for the Israel national team, and holds the record for appearances (191 international games) and points scored (3,515).

Maccabi Tel Aviv was the first Israeli club to enter the FIBA European Champions Cup (EuroLeague), in the 1958 season. Since then, it has played over 600 games in European-wide competitions, and was the only Israeli club to play in a FIBA European Cup Winners' Cup (FIBA Saporta Cup) Final (1967 Cup Winners' Cup), and to win the European-wide top-tier level EuroLeague on six occasions (1977, 1981, *2001 FIBA SuproLeague, 2004, 2005, and 2014). Maccabi has played in 15 EuroLeague Finals (1977, 1980, 1981, 1982, 1987, 1988, 1989, 2000, *2001 FIBA SuproLeague, 2004, 2005, 2006, 2008, 2011, and 2014). In 1994 and 2004, Tel Aviv organized the EuroLeague Final Four.

The first basketball game between an NBA and FIBA team was held in 1978 in Tel Aviv. The Maccabi Tel Aviv defeated the defending NBA champion Washington Bullets, 98–97.

Maccabi Tel Aviv has played a record 18 times against NBA teams, and became the first European team to win in an NBA arena, when it beat the Toronto Raptors in 2005, 105–103. In 1984, the team beat both the Phoenix Suns and New Jersey Nets to win a tournament held in Tel Aviv.

== Through the decades ==
=== 1950s ===
5 Israeli League championships, 3 Israeli Cups.

Early success in the Israeli League. Rivalry with Hapoel Tel Aviv begins.

=== 1960s ===
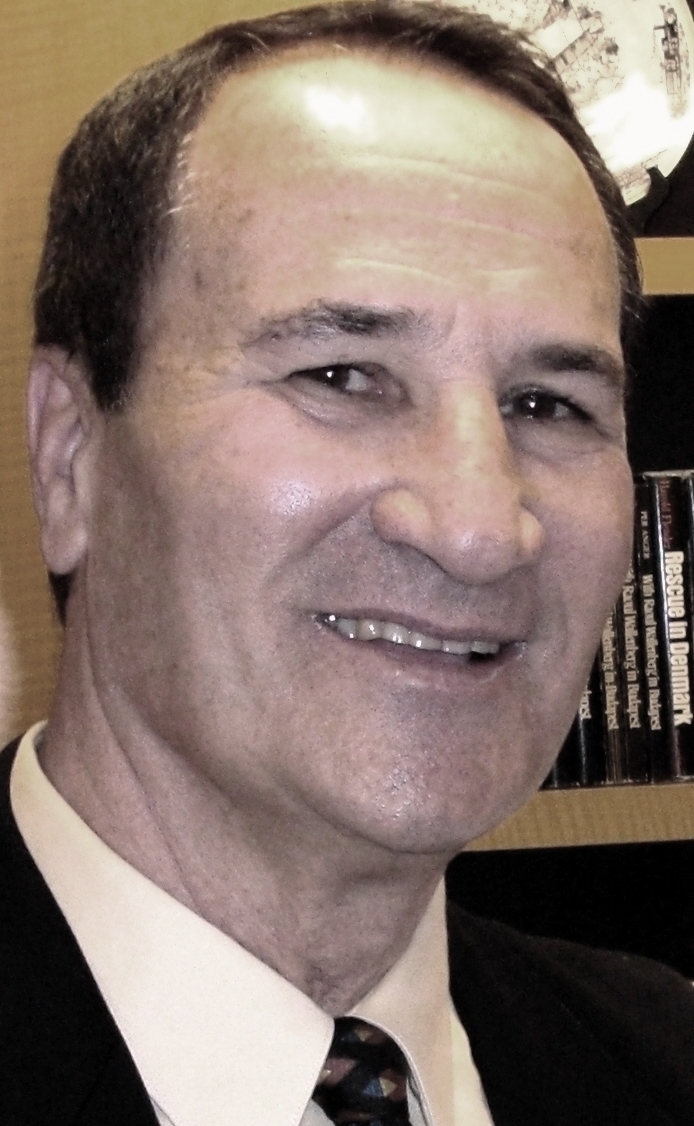
Tal Brody

5 Israeli League championships, 5 Israeli Cups.

The club has achieved its status of prominence with the presence of FIBA European All-Stars players, such as center Tanhum Cohen-Mintz, and continues to have a rivalry with its cross-town club Hapoel Tel Aviv.

Tal Brody came to Israel in 1966 from the United States, after having been drafted #12 in the 1965 National Basketball Association Draft, originally just to take one year out of his life to play for Maccabi Tel Aviv. Ralph Klein, Israel's most successful coach at the time, said that up until the enthusiastic Brody's arrival, Israelis had only viewed basketball as a fun game. But within a year, with his serious attitude and his inspirational commitment, Brody had inculcated his teammates with his view of basketball as a way of life. At his urging, the team doubled the number of practices it held every week.

To capitalize on Brody's quickness and speed, the coach abandoned the team's formerly slow pace, in favor of a fast-paced motion game, built around fast breaks. Brody was the most dominant player in the European-wide second tier level FIBA European Cup Winners' Cup (FIBA Saporta Cup) in the 1966–67 season. In 1967, he was named Israel's Sportsman of the Year. The team made it through the first, second, and third rounds of the European Cup Winners' Cup's (Saporta Cup) playoffs, and reached the Finals, finishing second in the league.

For the first time, the Israeli Prime Minister (Levi Eshkol), the Israel Defense Forces Chief of Staff, and Knesset members came to games. Demand for tickets to games in the team's 5,000-seat stadium was so high that they became exceedingly difficult to obtain.

=== 1970s ===
1 FIBA European Champions Cup (EuroLeague), 10 Israeli League championships, 8 Israeli Cups.

The rise to the top in Europe. The first EuroLeague championship in 1977 was soon followed by another finals appearance in 1980. Tal Brody was the captain of that Maccabi Tel Aviv team.

==== 1977 FIBA European Champions Cup: "We are on the map!" ====
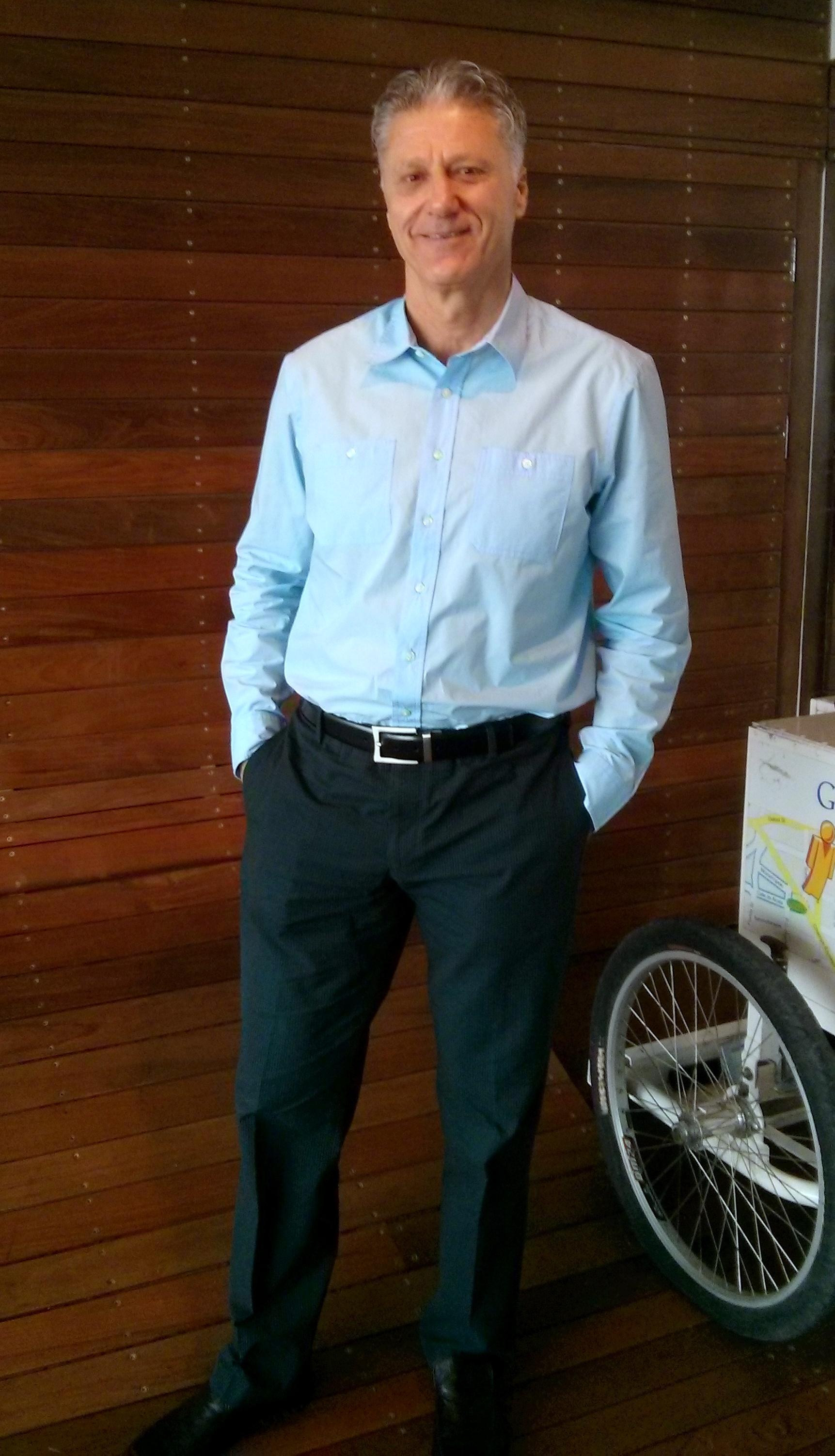
Miki Berkovich

The year 1977 was the apex of the Cold War, and the Soviet Union was boycotting Israel. In the first round of the FIBA European Champions Cup (EuroLeague) Maccabi Tel Aviv defeated Real Madrid, 94–85. In the second round, it beat BC Brno, Czechoslovak League, for the first time, 91–76, on 15 February 1977.

In the FIBA European Champions Cup semifinals, Maccabi Tel Aviv was matched against CSKA Moscow – the Red Army team. CSKA Moscow were considered a sporting powerhouse. The Soviet Army team had won the prior USSR League championship. Six of its players had played on the Soviet national team that had defeated the United States in the 1972 Summer Olympics, and their captain was Sergei Belov. And the Communists were well known for using sports to glorify what they billed as their supremacy over the West.

The Soviet Union had broken off diplomatic relations with Israel a decade earlier, and politically and militarily backed Israel's Arab enemies. For political reasons, therefore, CSKA Moscow refused to play in Tel Aviv. And the Soviets also refused to grant visas to the Israelis, to allow them to come play in Moscow. In the end, Maccabi Tel Aviv's "home game" was played in the small, neutral town of Virton, Belgium.

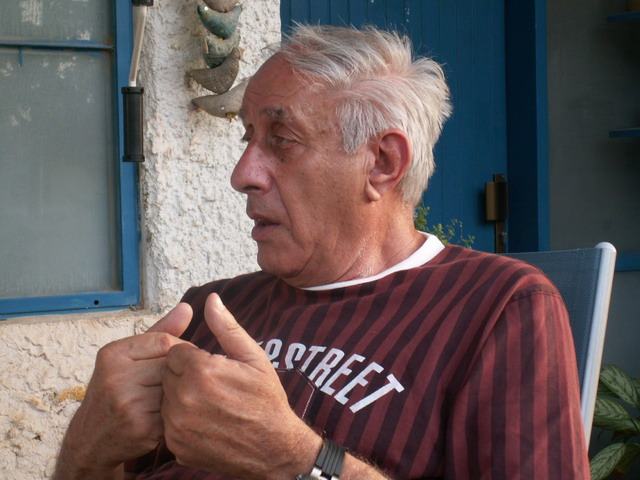
Ralph Klein

The game took place in an emotional atmosphere. It was of huge symbolic value for Maccabi Tel Aviv fans, and for many Israelis who ordinarily had no interest in basketball. The game pitted the capitalist West against the Communist East, and Israel against the country that was supplying its enemies with weapons. The game also matched the country of Israel, with a total of a mere 4 million inhabitants, against the Soviets, with their 290 million people. The newspaper Maariv billed the 17 February 1977, game as "the fight between David and Goliath." Most of Israel's population watched the game, which was broadcast on Israel's only TV channel at the time.

Maccabi Tel Aviv upset the heavily favored Soviets, 91–79. The feeling among Israelis was not only that CSKA Moscow had been defeated, but that a victory – albeit small – had been achieved against the mighty Soviet Union. The game has for decades been recognized as a key event in the forging of Israel's national identity. Even decades later, it was being replayed repeatedly on Israeli television.

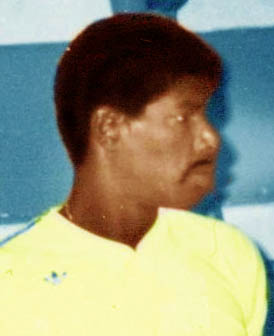
Aulcie Perry

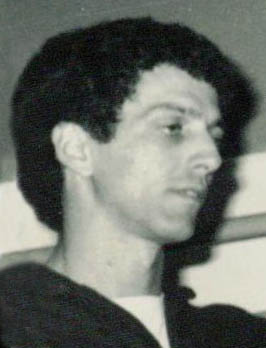
Motti Aroesti

"We are on the map!" proclaimed a euphoric Tal Brody, in his heavily American-accented Hebrew, as a TV announcer pushed a microphone in front of him for a post-game quote, while people danced the hora around, him in excitement and celebration. "And we are staying on the map – not only in sports, but in everything." The phrase "We are on the map!" ("anachnu al hamapa, ve'anahnu nisharim al hamapa!"), a literal translation of an English phrase into his adopted language, but a novel saying in Hebrew, became a new, popular phrase in Israel. It reflected a physical victory by the nascent Jewish Zionist idea, and national pride. It became Israel's most famous quote, and a staple of Israeli speech.

Back home, hundreds of thousands of Israelis celebrated spontaneously in the streets, and 150,000 in Tel Aviv congregated in celebration in what is now Rabin Square. Many jumped into its fountain, splashing in water and champagne. Recalling the moment, an Israeli quoted in the book From Beirut to Jerusalem told author Thomas Friedman that on one level it was Brody the star basketball player and his teammates beating the Russians, but on another level it was "my grandfather beating them. It was our retroactive victory over the Cossacks."

The FIBA European Champions Cup Finals were played in Belgrade, Yugoslavia, on 7 April 1977. Yugoslavia was a Non-Aligned country that supported Palestine, and with which Israel did not have diplomatic relations, and the El Al plane that brought the Maccabi Tel Aviv players over to it for the game, was the first Israeli plane ever allowed to land there.

The Israelis were pitted against the highly favored Mobilgirgi Varese, the champions of Italy's top league. Mobilgirgi Varese had beaten the Israelis twice that year, and had beaten them in the European-wide second-tier level FIBA European Cup Winners' Cup (FIBA Saporta Cup) Finals, ten years earlier, when Brody first started playing for Maccabi Tel Aviv. Back in Israel, the entire country watched the game on television.

Maccabi Tel Aviv went on to defeat Mobilgirgi Varese by one point, 78–77, in the FIBA European Champions Cup Finals. Brody, as the team's captain, received the FIBA European Cup trophy from FIBA's Secretary General, and lifted it over his head. Jim Boatwright was the game's leading scorer, with 26 points.

It was Israel's first FIBA European Champions Cup title, in the 23-nation league. It was also the first time that Israel had won a championship of that caliber in any sport, and was, at the time, Israel's greatest achievement in international sports. The victory greatly lifted the spirit and morale of the country. In Israel, 200,000 people gathered to celebrate in Israel's National Park, and the event was celebrated as a national holiday. When the team returned home, it found 150,000 Israelis waiting for it.

=== 1980s ===
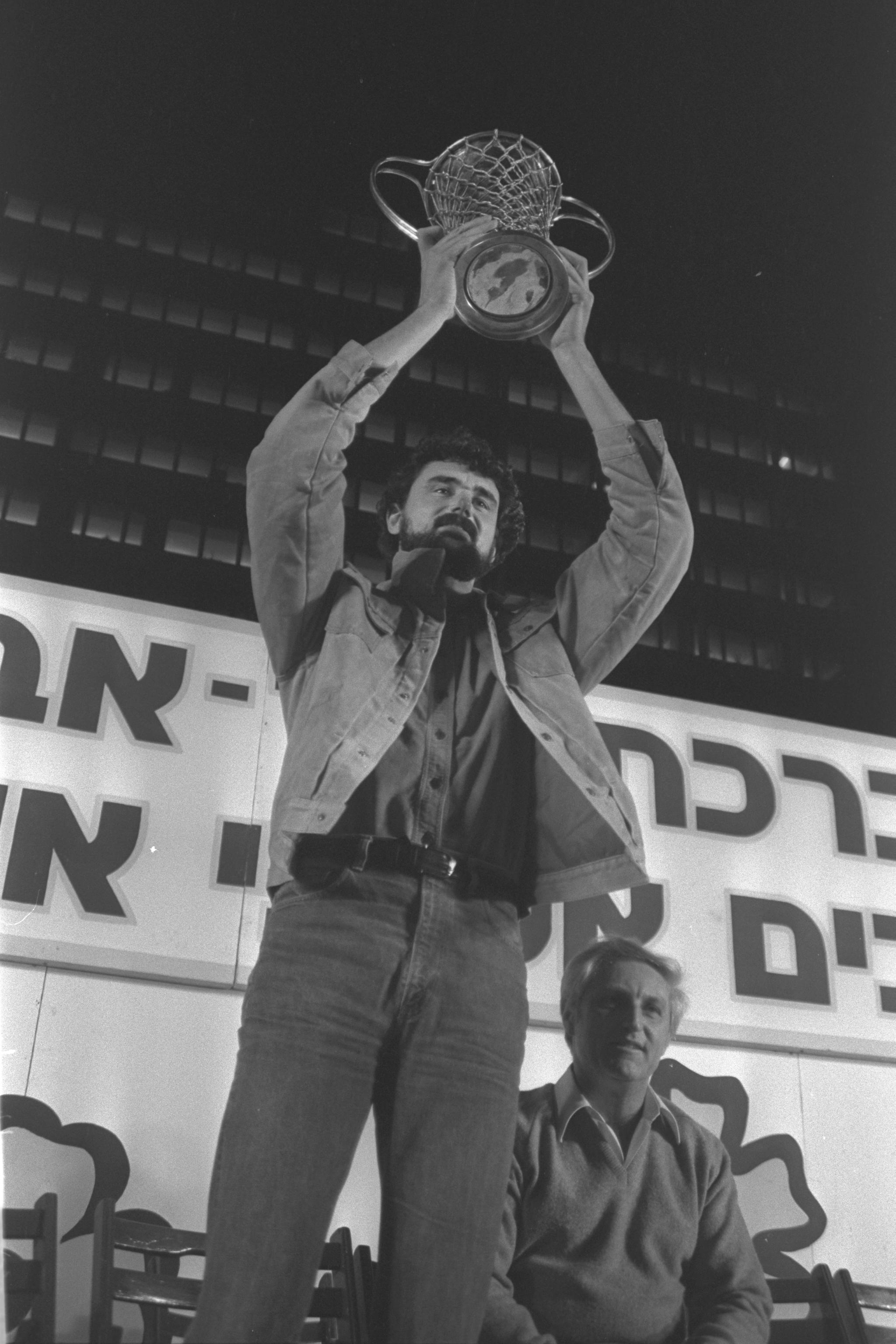
Jim Boatwright

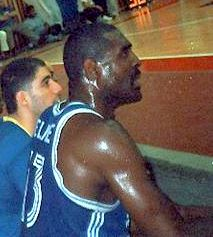
Kevin Magee

1 FIBA European Champions Cup (EuroLeague), 1 FIBA Intercontinental Cup, 10 Israeli League championships, 8 Israeli Cups.

A golden era of the Maccabi Tel Aviv ball club. Throughout the 1970s and 1980s, Maccabi dominated the Israeli Basketball Super League, winning all 20 league championships consecutively. Winning the FIBA European Champions Cup (EuroLeague) title in 1981, and reaching the FIBA European Champions Cup Finals for four more times, in 1982, 1987, 1988, and 1989. Miki Berkovich 1971–75, and 1976–88, Motti Aroesti 1974–88, Doron Jamchi 1985–96 and 1999–2000, Kevin Magee 1984–90, Lou Silver 1975–85, Ken Barlow 1987–90, Aulcie Perry 1976–85, and LaVon Mercer 1988–95 were the superstars of that Maccabi run.

==== 1981 FIBA European Champions Cup championship ====
Maccabi Tel Aviv beat Sinudyne Bologna, 80–79, in the Finals game, in Strasbourg, under head coach Rudy D'Amico. It was proof that Maccabi was at the top of European professional club basketball for good.

=== 1990s ===
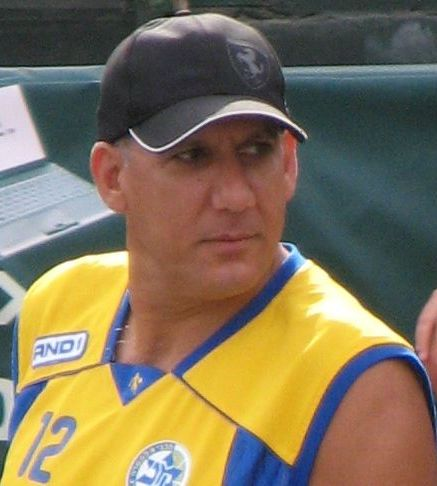
Doron Jamchi

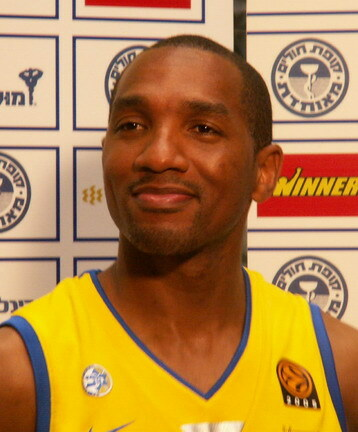
Derrick Sharp

9 Israeli League championships, 5 Israeli Cups.

For Maccabi Tel Aviv there was no European-wide title in the decade, and the team had struggles in European competitions. However, the club was still considered to be one of the European powerhouses of that era, as the club then featured European All-Stars such as Doron Jamchy and Oded Kattash, as well LaVon Mercer. With the exception of 1993, Maccabi absolutely dominated the Israel League, winning every championship.

=== 2000s ===
3 EuroLeague championships, 9 Israeli League championships, 7 Israeli Cups, 1 Israeli League Cup.

The "second golden era" of Maccabi Tel Aviv, making it the second most successful European basketball club of that decade. Maccabi made it to the FIBA EuroLeague's title game in 2000, which marked the start of Maccabi's second "golden era", the most successful of the club to date. During this decade, the club won three EuroLeague championships, in 2001 (FIBA SuproLeague), 2004, and 2005 respectively. They also reached the European title game on two more occasions, in 2006 and 2008. Ariel McDonald 1999–2002, Anthony Parker 2000–02 and 2003–06, Nate Huffman 1999–2002, Šarūnas Jasikevičius 2003–05, Maceo Baston 2003–06, Derrick Sharp 1996–2011, Nikola Vujčić 2002–08, and Tal Burstein 2000–09 and 2010–12 were the top players of Maccabi during this era.

==== 2001 FIBA SuproLeague championship ====
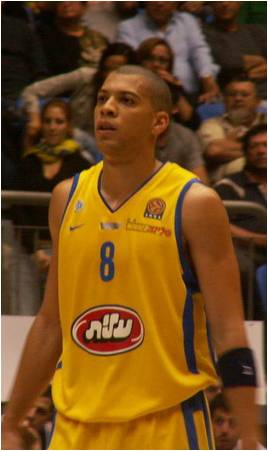
Anthony Parker

The return to European glory for the club. This was the only year in European-wide professional club basketball history, with two recognized top-tier level European-wide champions, from two different organizations. Maccabi Tel Aviv was recognized as the winner of the traditional FIBA tournament, which had been renamed from the FIBA EuroLeague, to the FIBA SuproLeague; and Kinder Bologna, which was recognized as the champions of the newly established EuroLeague, which was organized by EuroLeague Basketball.

==== 2004 and 2005, back-to-back EuroLeague championships ====
Maccabi experienced a successful 2003–04 season. Sharp's miracle three-pointer to survive the EuroLeague Top 16 that year has become one of the classic shots in European basketball history. Once in the 2004 EuroLeague Final Four, Maccabi turned in a record breaking performance, with an outstanding 118-point title game performance. Maccabi won a second consecutive EuroLeague title in 2005, becoming the first team to do so since 1991. Šarūnas Jasikevičius, Anthony Parker, Tal Burstein, Maceo Baston, and Nikola Vujčić, coached by Pini Gershon, became a classic lineup in European basketball history. This team of 2003–04 and 2004–05 is generally considered one of the best basketball teams in European club history. After Jasikevičius left the team, to fulfill his lifelong dream and play in the NBA, Maccabi went back to the 2006 EuroLeague Final, but CSKA Moscow stood in the way of a three-peat. Anthony Parker and Maceo Baston left after that year, signing multi-million dollar contracts with NBA teams. Center Nikola Vujčić stayed with Maccabi for two more years, playing in 2008 EuroLeague Final Four, before leaving the team, and signing a multi-million dollar deal with Olympiacos. Israeli Super League legends Derrick Sharp and Tal Burstein, remained with Maccabi, and continued to play for the team until 2011 and 2012, respectively. Maccabi also dominated the Israel League, winning every tournament from 1993 to 2007, and winning multiple Cup tournaments.

=== 2010s ===
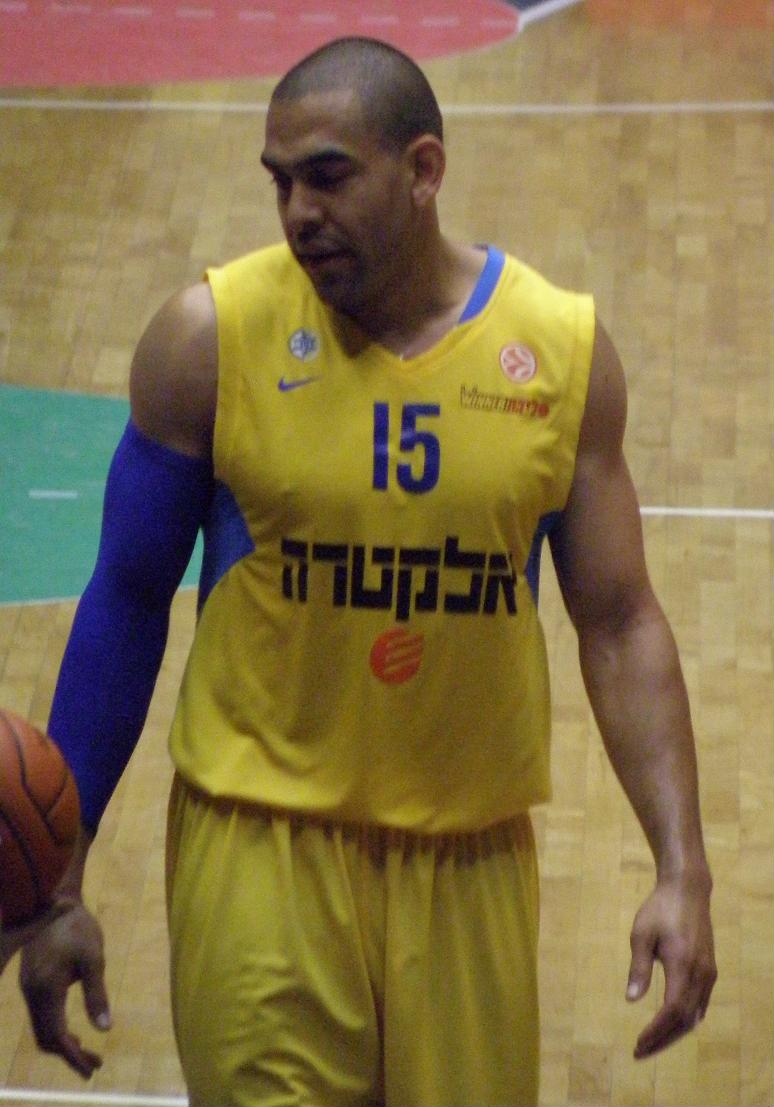
David Blu

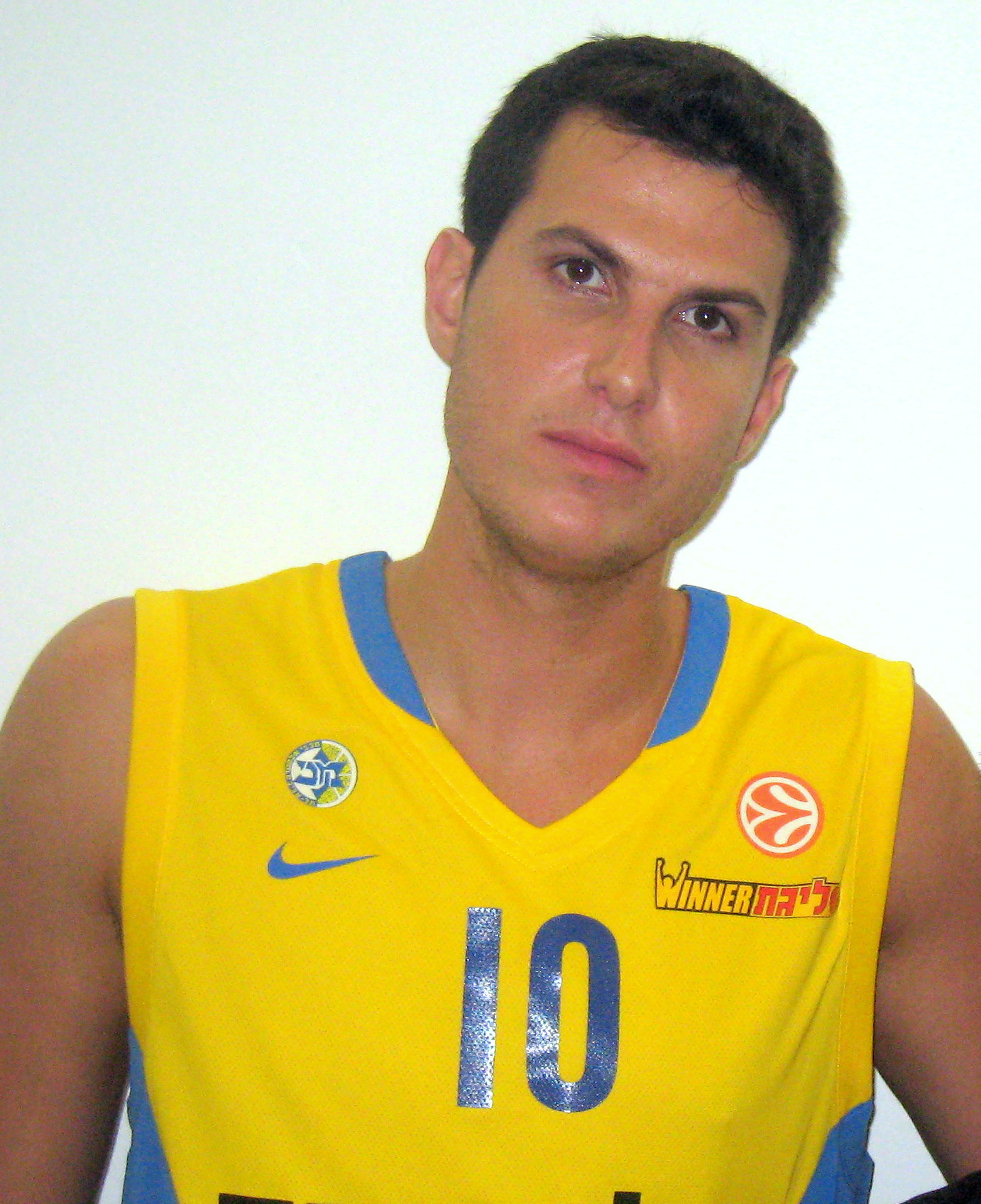
Guy Pnini

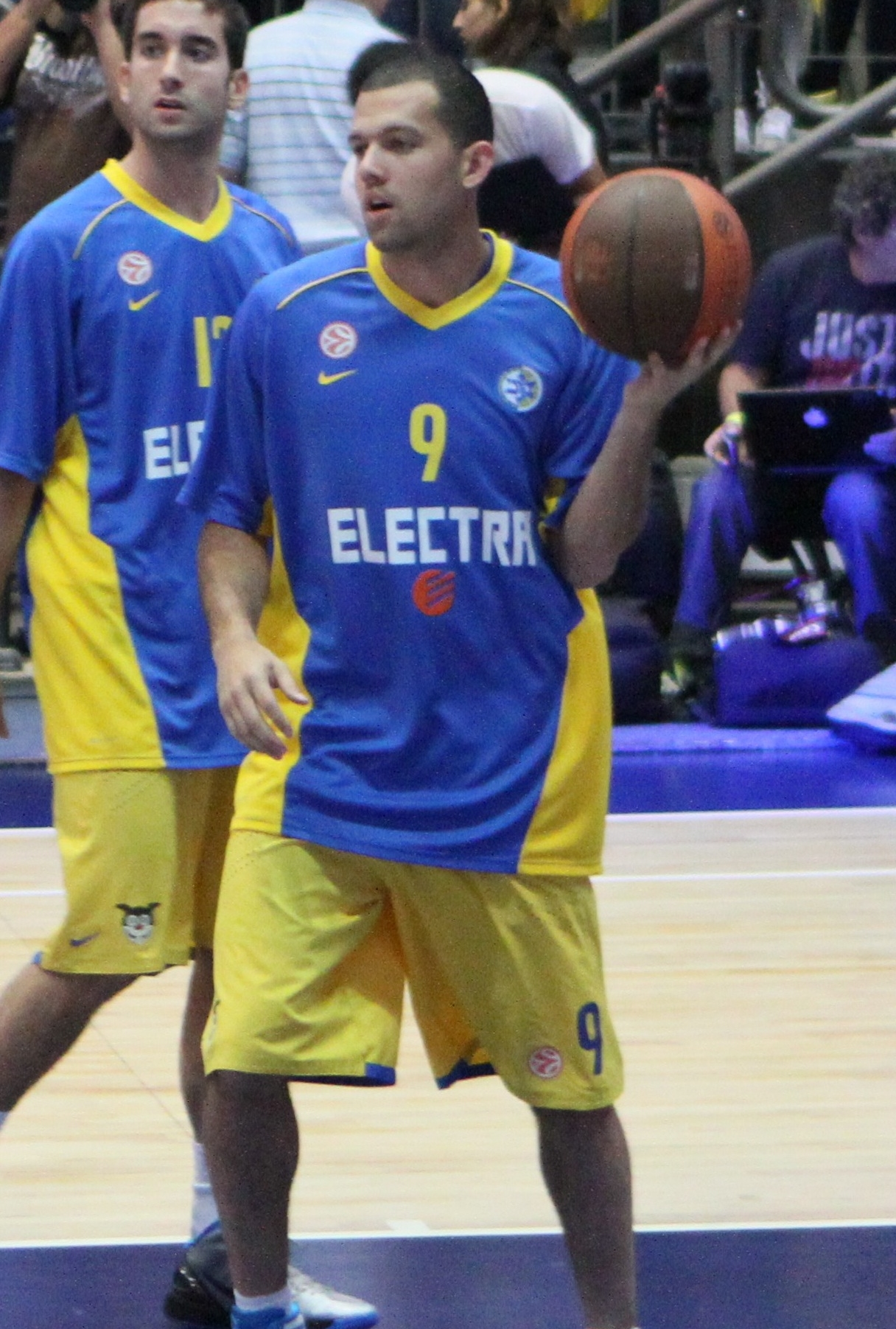
Jordan Farmar

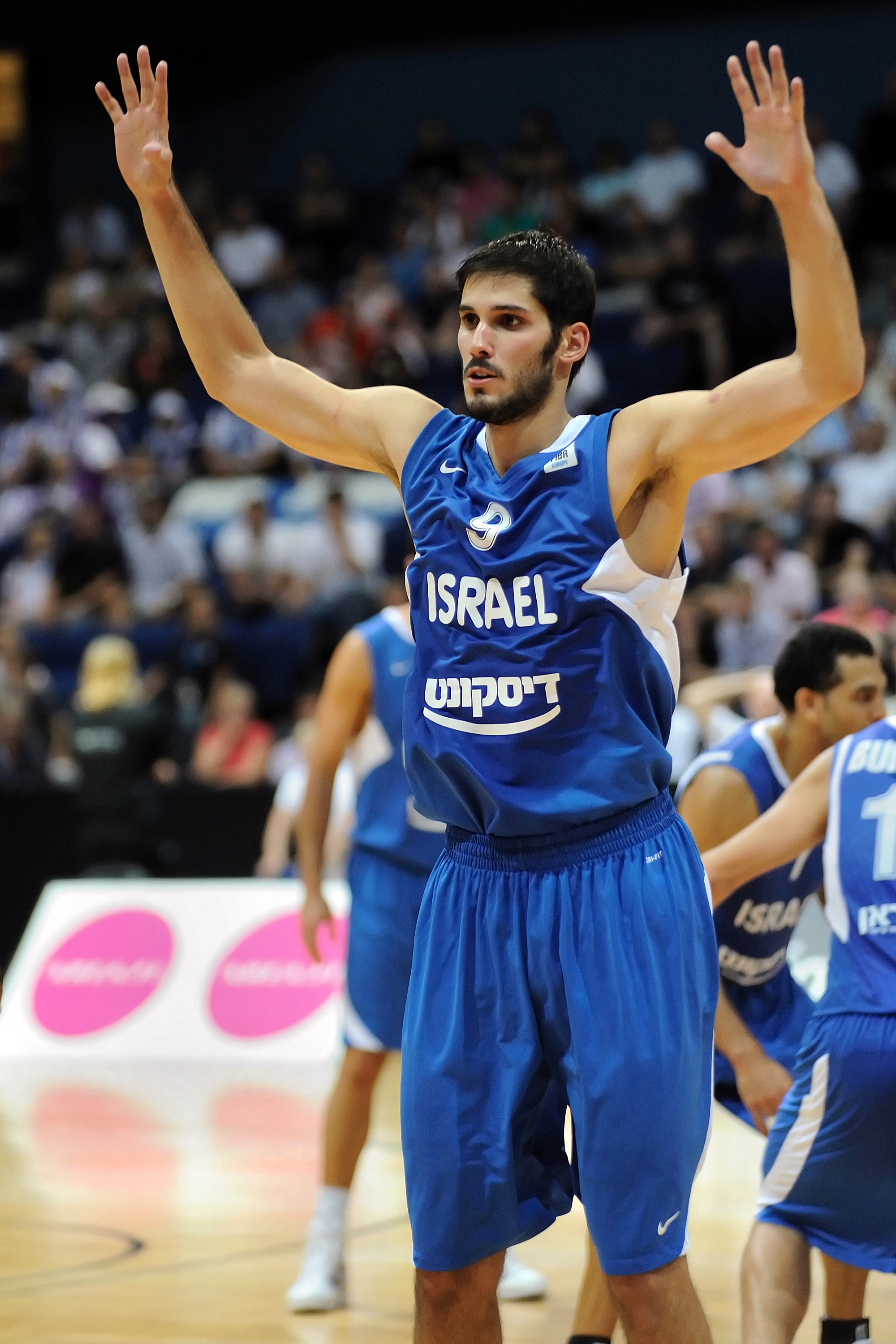
Omri Casspi

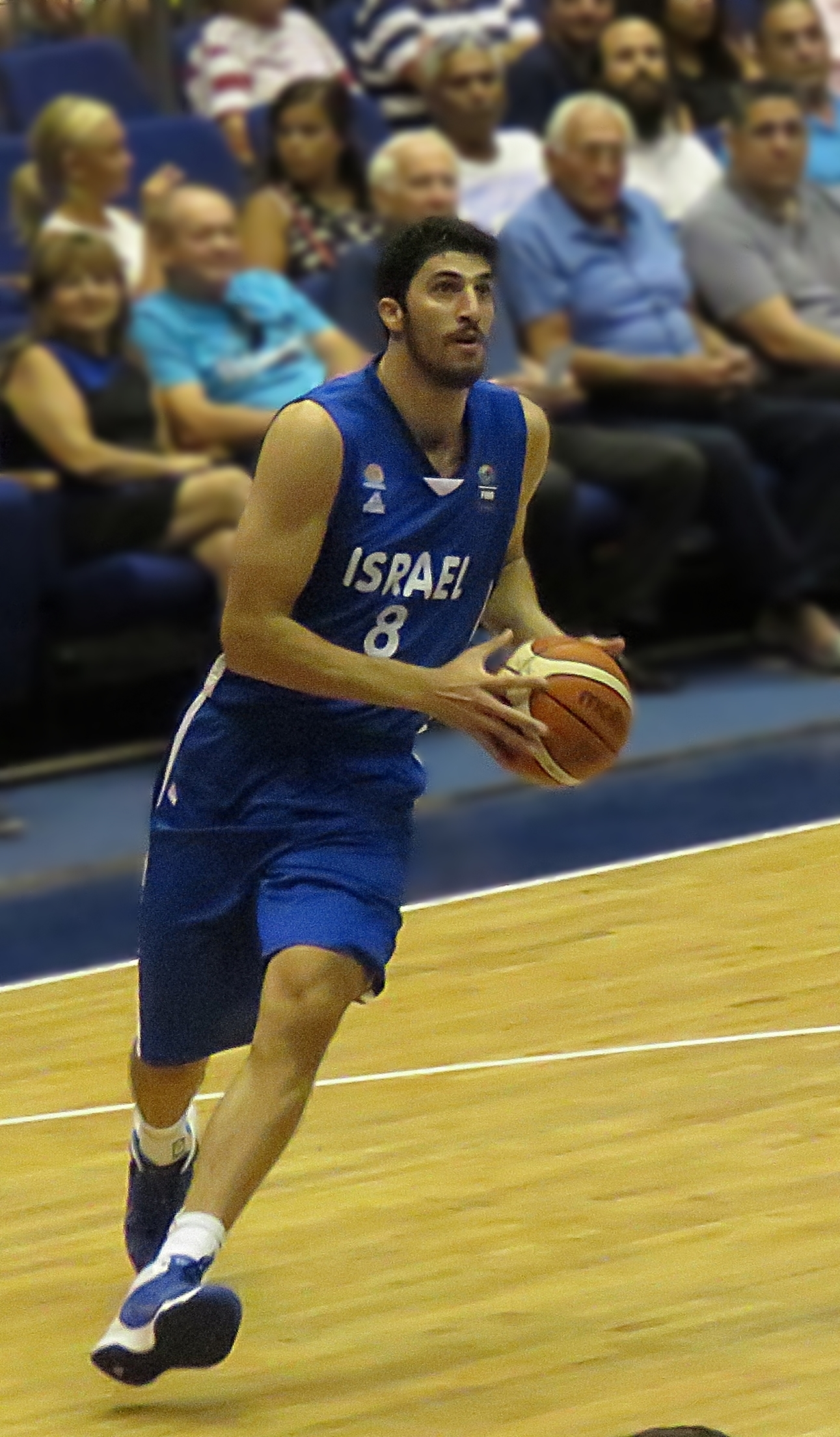
Lior Eliyahu

1 EuroLeague Championship, 5 Israeli League championships, 8 Israeli Cups, 6 Israeli League Cups, 1 Adriatic League championship.

For the 2010–11 season, management brought back head coach David Blatt, and added new premier players. Maccabi Tel Aviv reeled off nine consecutive wins to finish the EuroLeague regular season. Highlights included David Blu's game-winning triple against Khmki, Sofoklis Schortsanitis's dominance inside, and the defense of steals leaders Chuck Eidson and Doron Perkins. The momentum ended with a road loss at Regal FC Barcelona, at the start of the EuroLeague Top 16, but Maccabi surged again with three straight wins to reach the EuroLeague playoffs. Barca handed Maccabi another loss, this time in Tel Aviv – the only home defeat of the season – and ended Blatt's hopes for home-court advantage, in the next stage against Caja Laboral.

Maccabi Tel Aviv prevailed in the EuroLeague playoff series, as the injured Perkins' replacement in the starting lineup, Guy Pnini, set a single-game-career-high in scoring, along the way, and the team moved on to the 2011 Final Four. Jeremy Pargo finished with the best performance index rating, and the second-most points per game, among all playoffs participants. He also ranked among the top five players in three-pointers made, assists, and steals. Backup center Richard Hendrix was named MVP of the first round of the EuroLeague Playoffs, and finished as the overall playoff leader in rebounds and blocks. Maccabi Tel Aviv beat Real Madrid in the EuroLeague semifinals, 82–63, advancing to the EuroLeague Final game. On 8 May 2011, Maccabi lost the final game, 70–78, to Panathinaikos. With the exception of 2008 and 2010, Maccabi, up to 2011, also won every Israeli League from 1993.

Maccabi announced that it would join the Adriatic League for the 2011–12 season, joining the league for the second time, as it had also joined the league for the 2002–03 season, when it reached the League's finals game. This was supposed to bridge the gap between the highest basketball level Maccabi engages in, in the EuroLeague, and the low-level Israeli league.

On 3 August 2011, NBA point guard Jordan Farmar of the New Jersey Nets signed a one-year contract with Maccabi Tel Aviv, in the wake of the 2011 NBA lockout. He played for the team during the lockout. It was reported on 14 November 2011, that Maccabi also agreed to terms with Israeli NBA small forward Omri Casspi, to join the team in several weeks. However, the end of the NBA lockout, and the 25 December 2011 start date for the 2011–12 season, brought Casspi and Farmar back from Tel Aviv, to join their NBA teams (Cleveland and Brooklyn, respectively).

Maccabi Tel Aviv ended the season winning four titles: the Israeli League Cup, the Israeli State Cup, the Israeli Super League, and the Adriatic League. In the 2012–13 season, Maccabi won the Israeli League Cup and the Israeli State Cup, and reached the EuroLeague playoffs, losing to Real Madrid 0:3. In the Israeli Super League, Maccabi suffered a huge disappointment, as they lost to Maccabi Haifa 79:86 in the finals.

==== 2014 EuroLeague championship ====
In the 2013–14 EuroLeague season, Maccabi Tel Aviv finished first in their regular season group. The team went on to finish third in their top 16 group, leading to a best-of-5 playoff series against Emporio Armani Milano, without the home-court advantage. In the first game, Maccabi stunned the hosts from Milano, by turning a 7-point deficit, with 30 seconds remaining on the clock, into a 101–99 overtime victory. Maccabi then won two home games, to win the series 3–1, and to secure its place in the 2014 EuroLeague Final Four.

In the EuroLeague semifinals, Maccabi came from behind to defeat the heavily favored CSKA Moscow, with a last-second basket, after CSKA had been up by 15 points late in the game. Tyrese Rice scored the game-winning lay-up, with 5.5 seconds to go.

Maccabi Tel Aviv head coach David Blatt admitted after the semifinal that Maccabi had overshot every possible expectation during the season. When asked if the sky was the limit, Blatt said that "in this storm of a season, Maccabi long ago touched the sky, and reached the moon".

On 18 May 2014, Maccabi Tel Aviv won its sixth EuroLeague championship, after it defeated Real Madrid, by a score of 98–86, in overtime, to win the EuroLeague championship. Tyrese Rice was named the EuroLeague Final Four MVP. The game received worldwide media attention, after in response to Real Madrid's loss to Maccabi, over 18,000 anti-Semitic messages were posted on Twitter, in an outpouring of hatred against Jews. Maccabi entered the EuroLeague Finals as an underdog, with few expecting the team to even make it into the EuroLeague Final Four, let alone to go all the way and win the championship.

Following the success of winning the EuroLeague championship, Maccabi Tel Aviv's head coach David Blatt was hired to be the head coach of the NBA's Cleveland Cavaliers. Blatt's assistant, Guy Goodes was then appointed as his replacement at Maccabi.

==== 2014 FIBA International Cup ====
After winning the 2014 Euroleague Championship, Maccabi Tel Aviv was invited by FIBA to play 2014 FIBA Intercontinental Cup against Brazil's Flamengo, who won the 2014 FIBA Americas League. The two-game aggregate score tournament took place at the HSBC Arena in Rio de Janeiro, Brazil, on 26–28 September 2014, to determine the champion. After beating Flamengo at the first game by 69–66, Maccabi lost the second game by 90–77. The aggregate score was 156–146, which made Flamengo the 2014 FIBA International Cup champion. Guy Goodes was Maccabi's coach at these two games.

==== 2014–15 season ====
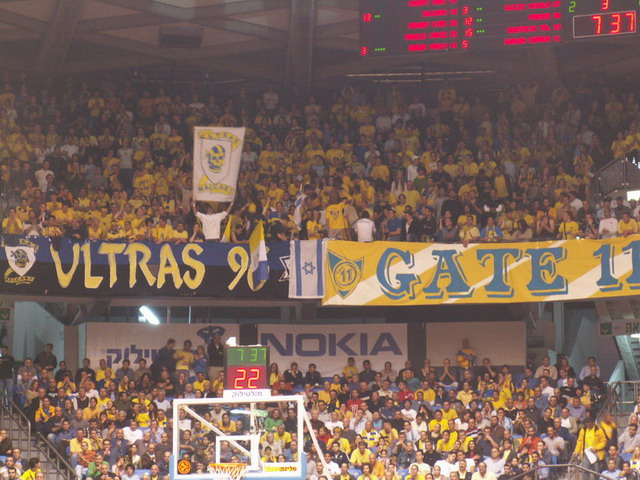
Maccabi fans in Yad Eliyahu Arena

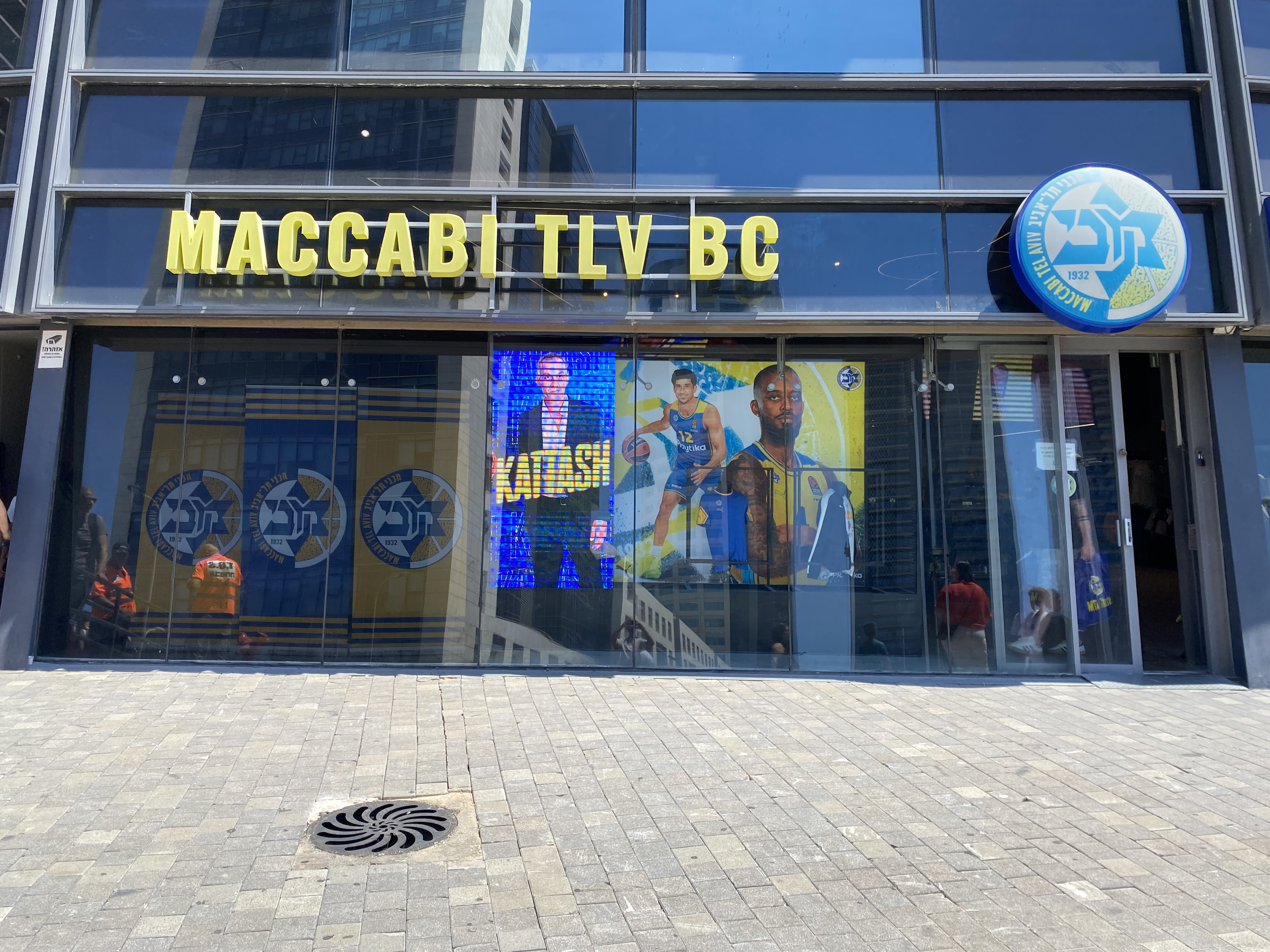
Maccabi Official Shop in Yad Eliyahu Arena

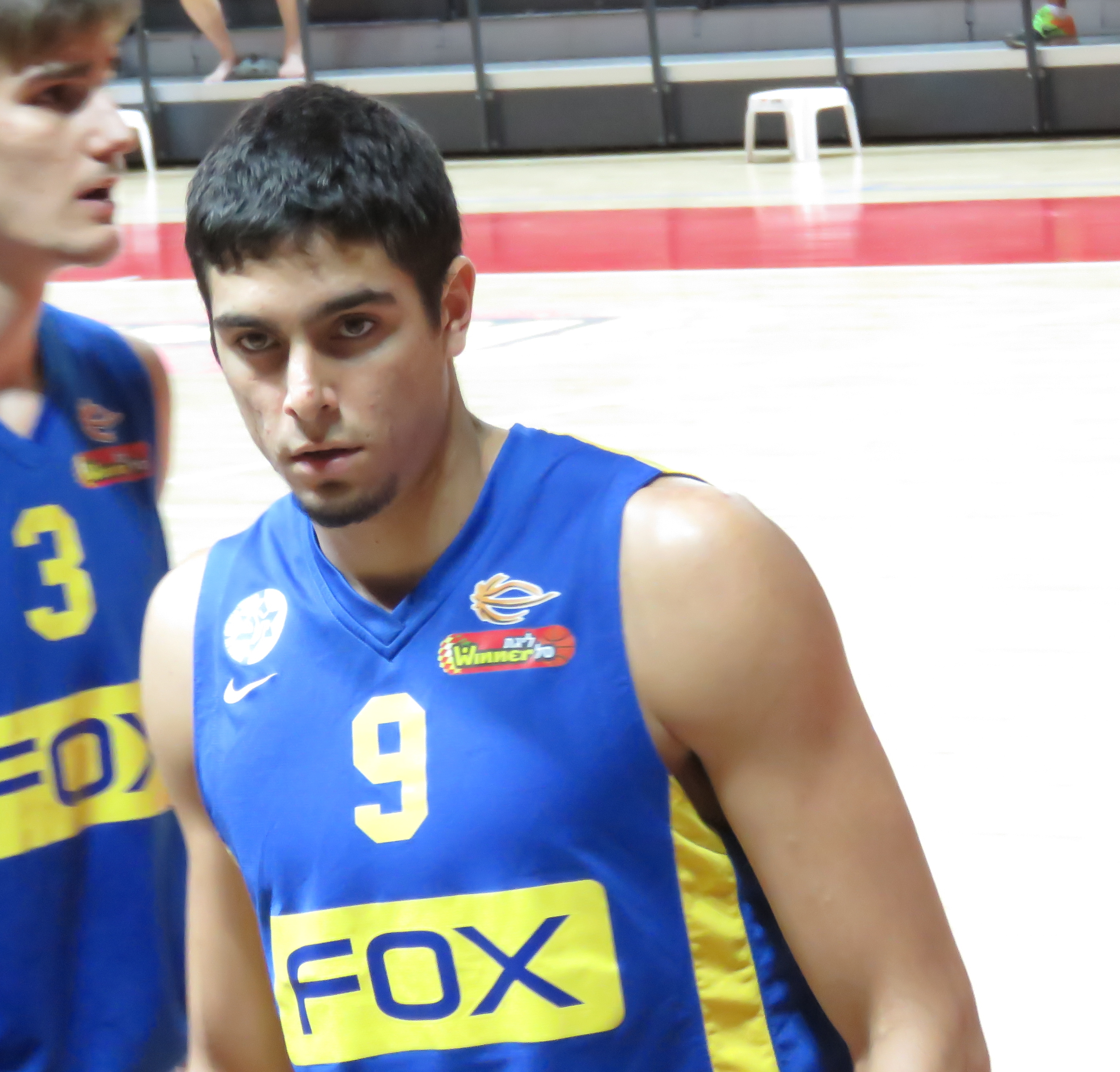
Itay Segev

Head coach David Blatt left Maccabi to coach the Cleveland Cavaliers. Assistant coach Guy Goodes was promoted to head coach. In the 2014–15 season, Maccabi Tel Aviv was defeated 2–3 in the Super League Semifinals by Hapoel Eilat. It was the first time in 22 years that Maccabi would not play in the Finals. In the EuroLeague, Maccabi lost in the playoffs to Fenerbahçe Ülker 0:3.

==== 2015–2017 Seasons: Downfall ====
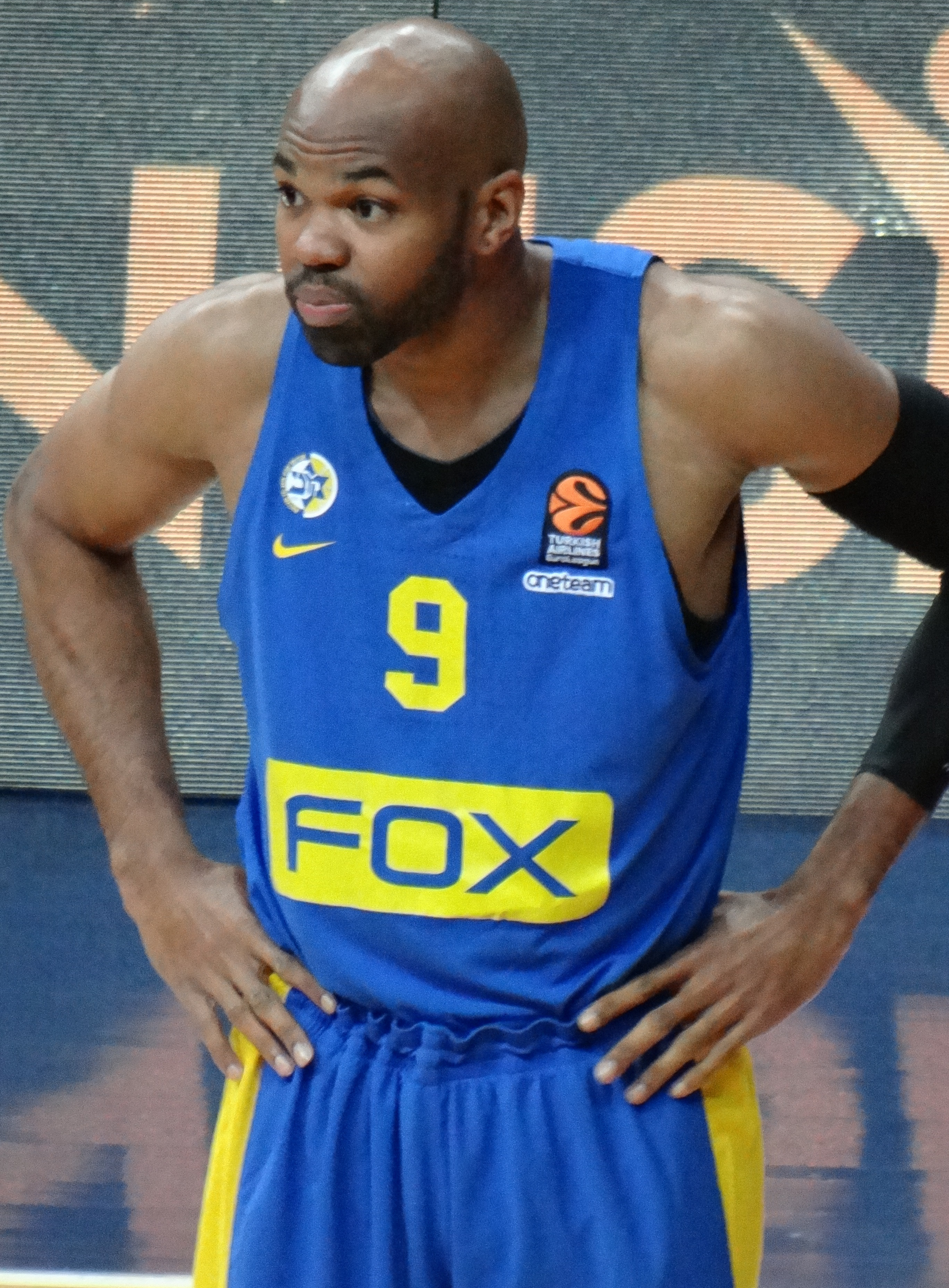
Alex Tyus

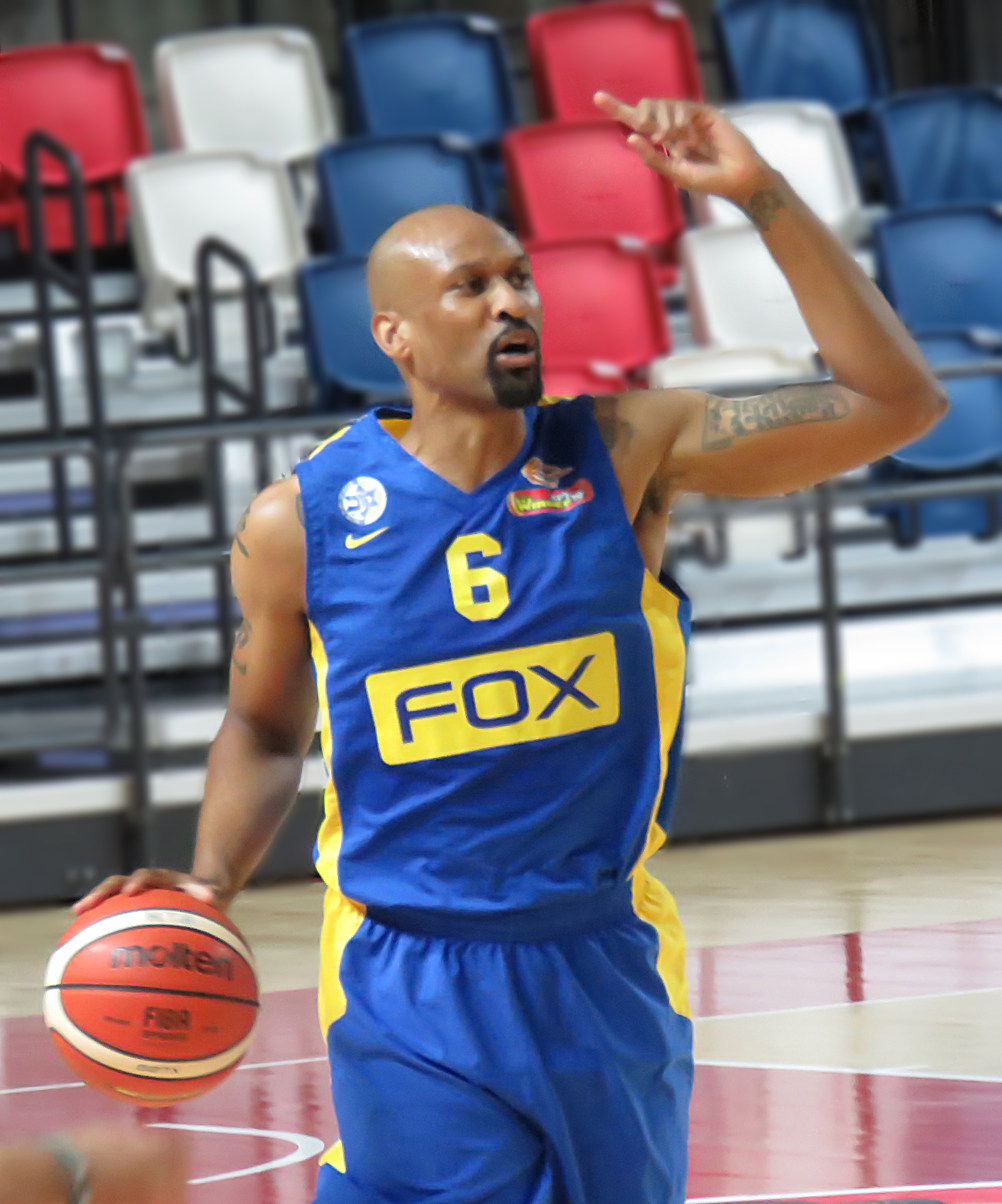
Devin Smith

Starting from the 2015–16 season, the team was named Maccabi FOX Tel Aviv, referring to the new main fashion line sponsor. New players were signed, including some proven players such as Taylor Rochestie and Vítor Faverani. Jordan Farmar returned, and prospect Dragan Bender gained more playing time as well.

After a slow start in the EuroLeague (1–3) and Israeli League (3–2), head coach Goodes was sacked on 9 November 2015. On 14 November, Žan Tabak signed a deal to become the head coach of Maccabi. Tabak lead the team to an Israeli Cup victory. Maccabi Tel Aviv was eventually eliminated from the EuroLeague after the regular season, and played in the 2015–16 Eurocup Basketball Last 32 phase, but failed to qualify for the playoffs after a loss at home to BC Nizhny Novgorod. The Israeli League season proved to be a disaster, when Maccabi was eliminated in the semifinal for the second consecutive season, this time by the eventual champions in Maccabi Rishon LeZion. This started a three-year spell of not doing well in either league.

The 2016–17 season was even worse for Maccabi Tel Aviv. During the summer, solid players such as Sonny Weems and Andrew Goudelock were signed, in hopes that they would lead Maccabi back to glory. Erez Edelstein was named the head coach. However, the season began with difficulties in both the Israeli League, and with losses in the EuroLeague, and Edelstein was fired. Assistant Rami Hadar briefly served as coach, before resigning after a series of losses, and Maccabi hired Ainars Bagatskis, who served as David Blatt's assistant in Darüşşafaka, as the new head coach. While Maccabi won the Israeli Cup with a win over rival Hapoel Jerusalem, in the EuroLeague, Maccabi finished in 14th place in the new format, while only finishing in 4th place in the Israeli League regular season. Bagatskis was fired just before the playoffs, with Arik Shivek becoming the new head coach for Maccabi. Maccabi made the 2017 Israeli Basketball Super League Final Four, but suffered a shocking loss to Maccabi Haifa in the semifinals, on the home Menora Mivtachim Arena floor. After the season, longtime player Devin Smith, with the team since the 2011–12 season, announced his retirement.

==== 2017–2020 ====
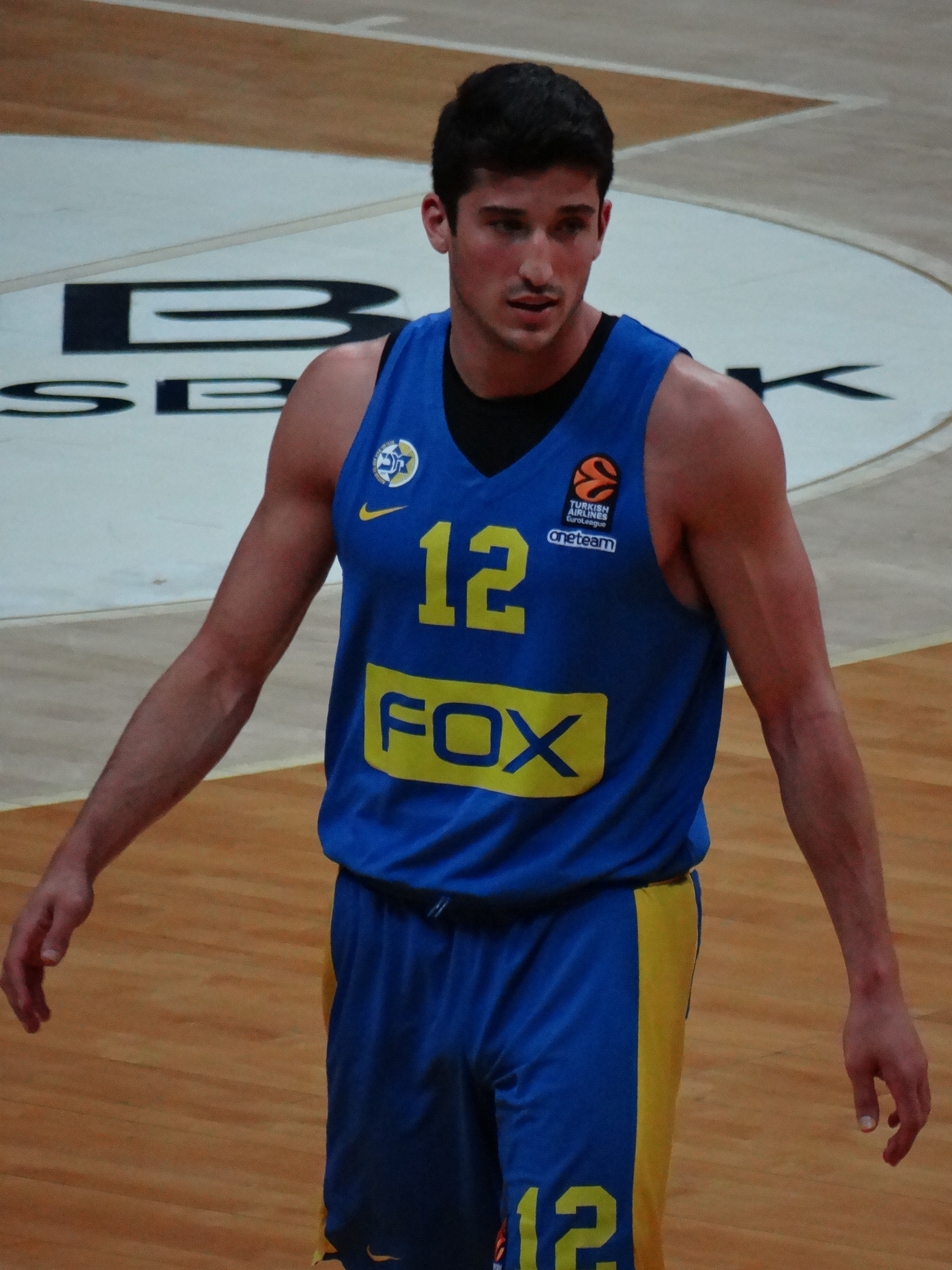
John DiBartolomeo

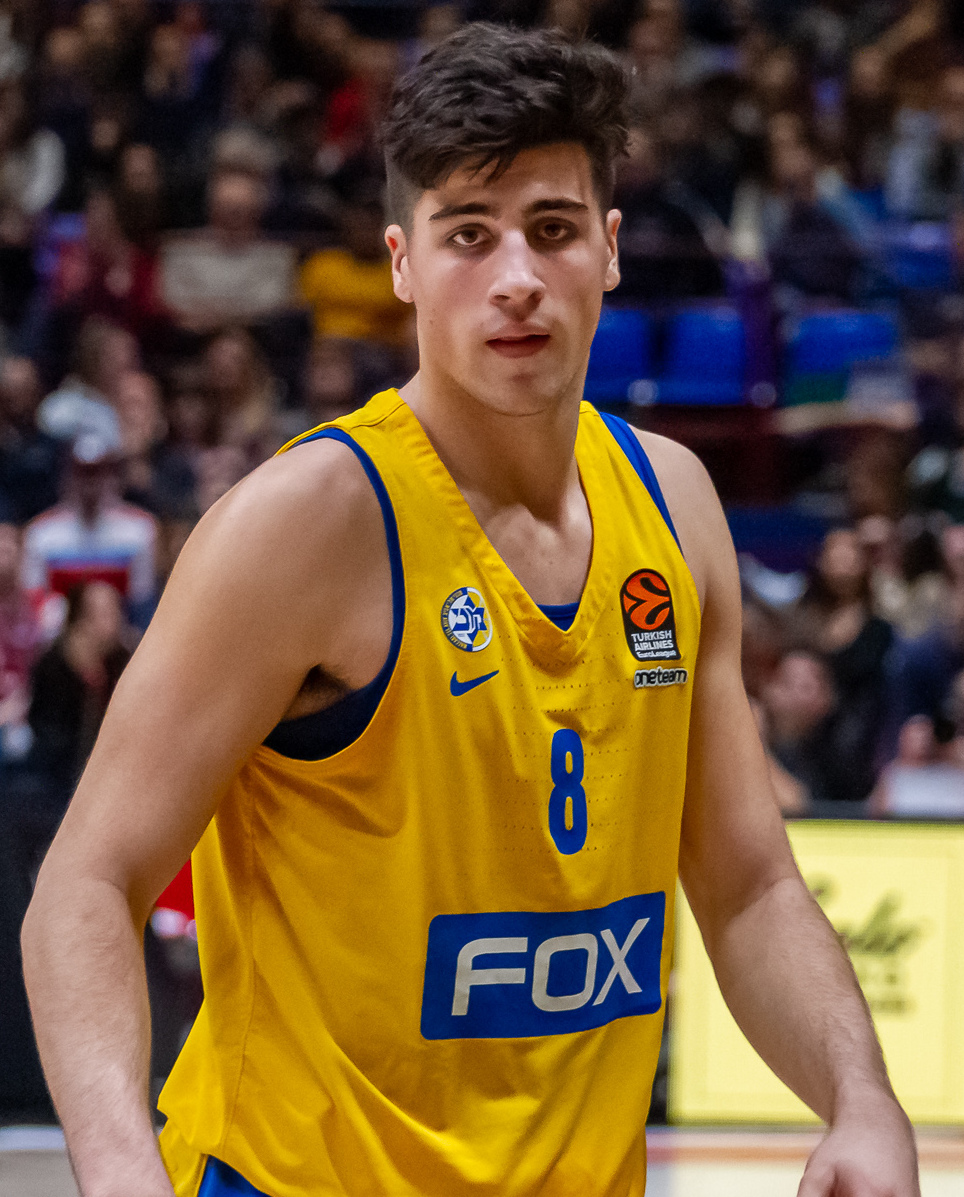
Deni Avdija

Neven Spahija returned to Maccabi Tel Aviv as the new head coach, having coached the team in the 2006–07 season. Forming a completely new team, Maccabi had a successful season – in the Euroleague, Maccabi fought for most of the season for a place in the playoffs, falling short only in the end, but finishing in 10th place, a huge improvement from the previous Euroleague seasons. In Israel, while Maccabi lost the Israeli State Cup for the first time since 2008, to Hapoel Holon, Maccabi won the Israel League Cup. In the Israeli League, Maccabi finished in 1st place in the regular season, and dominated in the playoffs, finishing by winning the 2018 Israeli Basketball Premier League Final Four, defeating Hapoel Tel Aviv 98:74 in the semifinals, and crushing Cup winner Hapoel Holon 95:75 in the finals, winning their first Israeli League since 2014. Alex Tyus was named the MVP.

For the 2018–19 season Maccabi Tel Aviv had high hopes. Coach Spahija started the season, but after four consecutive losses and a 1–6 start to the 2018–19 EuroLeague Season, Maccabi fired Spahija and hired Ioannis Sfairopoulos as the head coach. Maccabi improved, and nearly qualified for the Euroleague playoffs, though a few losses in the end prevented the team from qualification. Maccabi finished 10th. While Maccabi lost both Cup tournaments, they dominated the Israeli League – winning both 1st place in the regular season, and the 2019 Israeli Basketball Premier League Final Four tournament, held in Tel Aviv, to win the Israeli League for the second consecutive season, with John DiBartolomeo winning the MVP award.

=== 2020–present ===
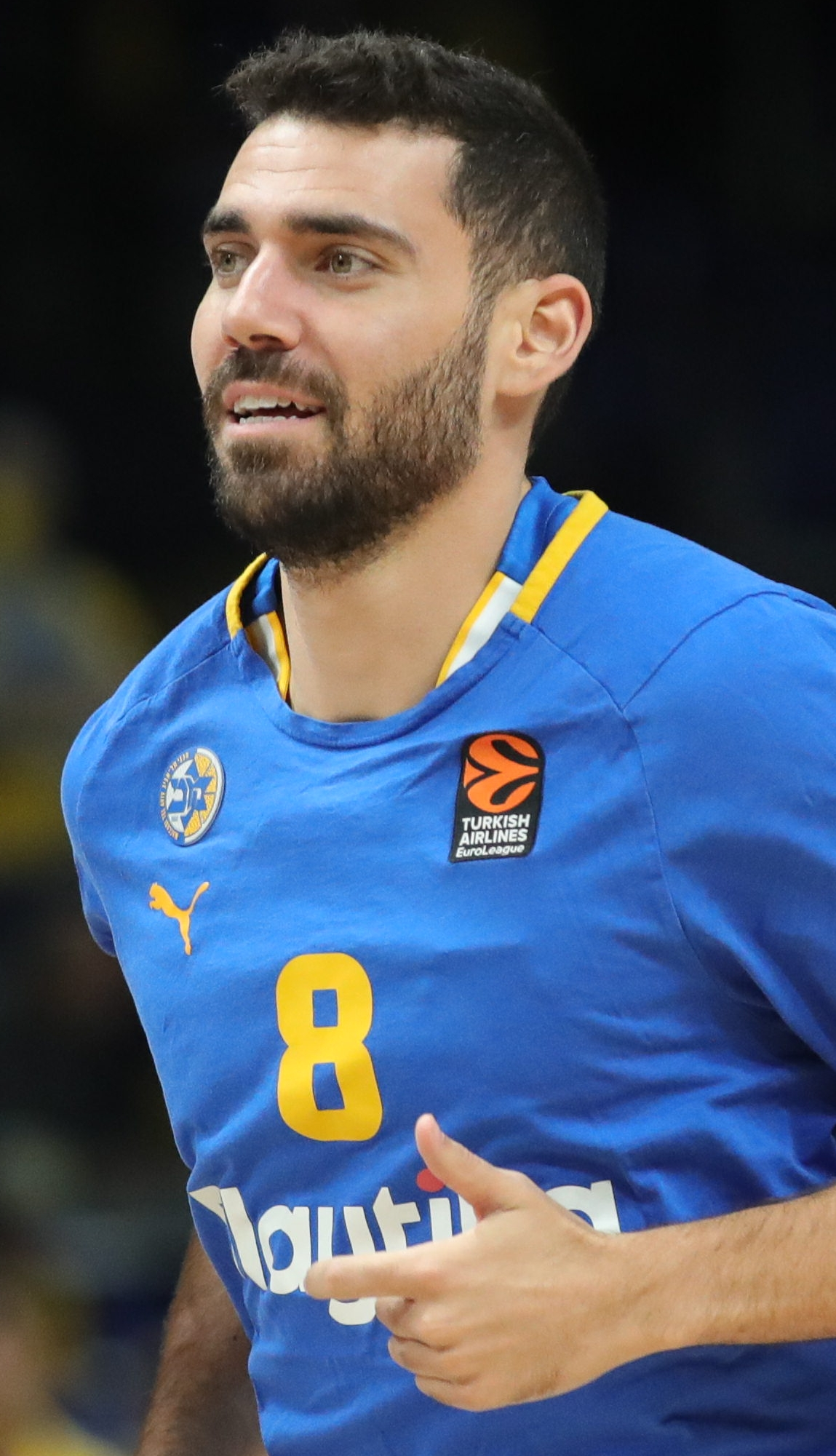
Rafi Menco

In the 2020–21 season, Maccabi Tel Aviv started off with no fans in attendance due to the COVID-19 pandemic in Israel, and got off to a rocky start, winning 14 out of 34 Euroleague games. In the Winner League, Maccabi beat Hapoel Gilboa Galil to win the Israeli finals series 2–1, to win its 55th championship.

Through the summer of 2021, Maccabi signed Jalen Reynolds who had already played for the club, alongside James Nunnally and Derrick Williams.

Due to the Russian invasion of Ukraine, the records of all regular season matches against Russian teams were annulled, and team won-loss records adjusted accordingly, dramatically affecting league standings. In the case of Maccabi Tel Aviv, it had lost three of four games against the Russian teams.

Due to the Gaza war, Maccabi have played all home games at Aleksandar Nikolic Hall in Belgrade, Serbia since the 2023–24 EuroLeague season. On December 11, 2025 Maccabi returned to Menora Mivtachim Arena. However, due to Iran war, the team moved its EuroLeague games to Aleksandar Nikolic Hall.

In November 2026, Maccabi announced that it would be moving its home games to Limassol, Cyprus.

== Arena ==
=== Menora Mivtachim Arena ===
Yad Eliyahu Arena, for sponsorship reasons known as the Menora Mivtachim Arena, is located in the Yad Eliyahu neighborhood in Tel Aviv and has a capacity of 10,383. The arena has been serving as the team's home arena since 1964.

== Supporters ==
In Yad Eliyahu Arena, Maccabi is followed by one organised group: "The GATE" which was founded in 2017 after the merger of two organized groups, the first one is "Gate 11" and the second one is "Gate 7".

== Accomplishments per season ==
Accomplishments per season
Season	Israeli League	Israeli Cup	League Cup	European Championship	Intercontinental Cup	Head coach	Hall of Fame
1953‍–‍54	Champion	—	—	—	—	Yehoshua Rozin	Klein
1954‍–‍55	Champion	—	—	—	—	Yehoshua Rozin	Klein
1955‍–‍56	not held	Champion	—	—	—	Yehoshua Rozin	Klein
1956‍–‍57	Champion	not held	—	—	—	Yehoshua Rozin	Klein
1957‍–‍58	Champion	Champion	—	First round	—	Yehoshua Rozin	Klein
1958‍–‍59	Champion	Champion	—	First round	—	Yehoshua Rozin	Klein, Cohen-Mintz
1959‍–‍60	Finalist	—	—	—	—	Yehoshua Rozin	Klein, Cohen-Mintz
1960‍–‍61	Finalist	Champion	—	—	—	Yehoshua Rozin	Klein, Cohen-Mintz
1961‍–‍62	Champion	Finalist	—	—	—	Yehoshua Rozin	Klein, Cohen-Mintz
1962‍–‍63	Champion	Champion	—	First round	—	Yehoshua Rozin	Klein, Cohen-Mintz
1963‍–‍64	Champion	Champion	—	First round	—	Yehoshua Rozin	Klein, Cohen-Mintz
1964‍–‍65	3rd place	Champion	—	First round	—	Yehoshua Rozin	Klein, Cohen-Mintz
1965‍–‍66	Finalist	Champion	—	—	—	Yehoshua Rozin	Cohen-Mintz
1966‍–‍67	Champion	not held	—	Finalist (Saporta Cup)	—	Yehoshua Rozin	Cohen-Mintz, Brody
1967‍–‍68	Champion	not held	—	Quarter finalist	—	Yehoshua Rozin	Cohen-Mintz, Brody
1968‍–‍69	Finalist	Finalist	—	Quarter finalist	—	Yehoshua Rozin	Cohen-Mintz, Brody
1969‍–‍70	Champion	Champion	—	First round (Saporta Cup)	—	Ralph Klein	Cohen-Mintz, Brody
1970‍–‍71	Champion	Champion	—	First round	—	Ralph Klein	Cohen-Mintz, Brody, Berkovich
1971‍–‍72	Champion	Champion	—	First round	—	Ralph Klein	Cohen-Mintz, Brody, Berkovich
1972‍–‍73	Champion	Champion	—	Quarter finalist	—	Yehoshua Rozin	Cohen-Mintz, Brody, Berkovich
1973‍–‍74	Champion	not held	—	Quarter finalist	—	Yehoshua Rozin	Cohen-Mintz, Brody, Berkovich
1974‍–‍75	Champion	Champion	—	Quarter finalist	—	Fred Dwilly; Abraham Hamo	Cohen-Mintz, Brody, Berkovich, Aroesti
1975‍–‍76	Champion	Eighth finals	—	Quarter finalist	—	Ralph Klein	Brody, Aroesti, Silver, Boatwright
1976‍–‍77	Champion	Champion	—	Champion	3rd place	Ralph Klein	Brody, Aroesti, Silver, Boatwright, Berkovich, Perry
1977‍–‍78	Champion	Champion	—	3rd place	—	Ralph Klein	Aroesti, Silver, Boatwright, Berkovich, Perry
1978‍–‍79	Champion	Champion	—	3rd place	—	Ralph Klein	Aroesti, Silver, Boatwright, Berkovich, Perry
1979‍–‍80	Champion	Champion	—	Finalist	Champion	Ralph Klein	Aroesti, Silver, Boatwright, Berkovich, Perry, Williams
1980‍–‍81	Champion	Champion	—	Champion	7th place	Rudy D'Amico	Aroesti, Silver, Boatwright, Berkovich, Perry, Williams
1981‍–‍82	Champion	Champion	—	Finalist	3rd place	Ralph Klein	Aroesti, Silver, Boatwright, Berkovich, Perry, Williams
1982‍–‍83	Champion	Champion	—	5th place	—	Ralph Klein	Aroesti, Silver, Berkovich, Perry
1983‍–‍84	Champion	Semi finalist	—	5th place	—	Zvi Sherf	Aroesti, Silver, Berkovich, Perry
1984‍–‍85	Champion	Champion	—	3rd place	—	Zvi Sherf	Aroesti, Silver, Berkovich, Perry, Magee
1985‍–‍86	Champion	Champion	—	5th place	—	Zvi Sherf	Aroesti, Berkovich, Magee, Jamchi
1986‍–‍87	Champion	Champion	—	Finalist	4th place	Zvi Sherf	Aroesti, Berkovich, Magee, Jamchi
1987‍–‍88	Champion	First round	—	Finalist	—	Ralph Klein	Aroesti, Berkovich, Magee, Jamchi
1988‍–‍89	Champion	Champion	—	Finalist	—	Zvi Sherf	Magee, Jamchi
1989‍–‍90	Champion	Champion	—	6th place	—	Zvi Sherf	Magee, Jamchi
1990‍–‍91	Champion	Champion	—	3rd place	—	Zvi Sherf	Jamchi
1991‍–‍92	Champion	Semi finalist	—	Quarter finalist	—	Zvi Sherf	Jamchi
1992‍–‍93	Semi finalist	Quarter finalist	—	First round	—	Eli Kanti	Jamchi
1993‍–‍94	Champion	Champion	—	Quarter finalist (Korać Cup)	—	Muli Katzurin	Jamchi
1994‍–‍95	Champion	Semi finalist	—	Round of 16	—	Muli Katzurin	Jamchi
1995‍–‍96	Champion	Finalist	—	Quarter finalist	—	Zvi Sherf	Jamchi
1996‍–‍97	Champion	Finalist	—	Round of 16	—	Zvi Sherf	Sharp
1997‍–‍98	Champion	Champion	—	Round of 16	—	Vinko Jelovac	Sharp
1998‍–‍99	Champion	Champion	—	Round of 16	—	Pini Gershon	Sharp
1999‍–‍00	Champion	Champion	—	Finalist	—	Pini Gershon	Sharp, Jamchi, Huffman, McDonald
2000‍–‍01	Champion	Champion	—	Champion (SuproLeague)	—	Pini Gershon	Sharp, Huffman, McDonald, Parker, Burstein
2001‍–‍02	Champion	Champion	—	Final Four	—	David Blatt	Sharp, Huffman, McDonald, Parker, Burstein
2002‍–‍03	Champion	Champion	—	Top 16	—	David Blatt	Sharp, Burstein, Vujčić, Blu
2003‍–‍04	Champion	Champion	—	Champion	—	Pini Gershon	Sharp, Burstein, Vujčić, Blu, Parker, Baston, Jasikevičius
2004‍–‍05	Champion	Champion	—	Champion	—	Pini Gershon	Sharp, Vujčić, Parker, Baston, Jasikevičius, Casspi
2005‍–‍06	Champion	Champion	—	Finalist	—	Pini Gershon	Sharp, Vujčić, Parker, Baston, Casspi, Burstein
2006‍–‍07	Champion	Semi finalist	—	Quarter finalist	—	Neven Spahija	Sharp, Vujčić, Burstein, Eliyahu
2007‍–‍08	Finalist	Finalist	Champion	Finalist	—	Oded Kattash; Zvi Sherf	Sharp, Vujčić, Burstein, Eliyahu, Blu, Casspi
2008‍–‍09	Champion	Round of 16	Quarter finalist	Top 16	—	Effi Birnbaum; Pini Gershon	Sharp, Burstein, Eliyahu, Casspi
2009‍–‍10	Finalist	Champion	Finalist	Quarter finalist	—	Pini Gershon	Sharp, Blu
2010‍–‍11	Champion	Champion	Champion	Finalist	—	David Blatt	Sharp, Blu, Burstein, Eliyahu
2011‍–‍12	Champion	Champion	Champion	Quarter finalist	—	David Blatt	Blu, Burstein, Eliyahu, Smith
2012‍–‍13	Finalist	Champion	Champion	Quarter finalist	—	David Blatt	Eliyahu, Smith
2013‍–‍14	Champion	Champion	Champion	Champion	—	David Blatt	Smith, Blu
2014‍–‍15	Semi finalist	Champion	Finalist	Quarter finalist	Finalist	Guy Goodes	Smith
2015‍–‍16	Semi finalist	Champion	Champion	First round (Euroleague); Last 32 (Eurocup)	—	Žan Tabak	Smith
2016‍–‍17	Semi finalist	Champion	Finalist	Regular season	—	Arik Shivek	Smith
2017‍–‍18	Champion	Finalist	Champion	Regular season	—	Neven Spahija	
2018‍–‍19	Champion	Quarter finalist	Quarter finalist	Regular season	—	Ioannis Sfairopoulos	
2019‍–‍20	Champion	Quarter finalist	Finalist	~~Regular season~~ (cancelled)	—	Ioannis Sfairopoulos	
2020‍–‍21	Champion	Champion	Champion	Regular season	—	Ioannis Sfairopoulos	
2021‍–‍22	Semi finalist	Semi finalist	Champion	Quarter finalist	—	Ioannis Sfairopoulos	
2022‍–‍23	Champion	Finalist	Champion	Quarter finalist	—	Oded Kattash	
2023‍–‍24	Champion	Finalist	Finalist	Quarter finalist	—	Oded Kattash	
2024‍–‍25	Co-finalist (cancelled)	Champion	Champion	Regular season	—	Oded Kattash	
2025‍–‍26	Champion	Champion	Semi finalist	Regular season	—	Oded Kattash	
2026‍–‍27	Ongoing	Ongoing	Quarter finalist	Ongoing	—	Oded Kattash	
Season	Israeli League	Israeli Cup	League Cup	European Championship	Intercontinental Cup	Head coach	Hall of Fame

== Players ==
=== Current roster ===
Note: Flags indicate national team eligibility at FIBA-sanctioned events. Players may hold other non-FIBA nationalities not displayed.

Maccabi Tel Aviv roster
Players
Coaches

Pos.	No.	Nat.	Name	Ht.	Wt.	Age
SG	0	(Denmark)	Lundberg, Gabriel (injured)	1.93 m (6 ft 4 in)	92 kg (203 lb)	31 – 4 December 1994
PF	1	(France)	Hoard, Jaylen	2.03 m (6 ft 8 in)	102 kg (225 lb)	27 – 30 March 1999
G	2	(United States)	Clark III, Jimmy	1.91 m (6 ft 3 in)	79 kg (174 lb)	25 – 4 April 2001
PG	3	(Israel)	Ebo, Amit	1.84 m (6 ft 0 in)	90 kg (198 lb)	27 – 6 October 1999
SF	4	(Israel)	Lavy, Gur (injured)	1.98 m (6 ft 6 in)	90 kg (198 lb)	25 – 27 March 2001
C	5	(United States)	Bacot, Armando	2.08 m (6 ft 10 in)	109 kg (240 lb)	26 – 6 March 2000
G/F	7	(Israel)	Dodo, Nitay	1.94 m (6 ft 4 in)	88 kg (194 lb)	18 – 13 December 2007
F/C	9	(Israel)	Sorkin, Roman	2.08 m (6 ft 10 in)	108 kg (238 lb)	30 – 11 August 1996
F	10	(Canada)	Brissett, Oshae	2.01 m (6 ft 7 in)	95 kg (209 lb)	28 – 20 June 1998
F	11	(Israel) (United States)	Rayman, Will	2.03 m (6 ft 8 in)	101 kg (223 lb)	29 – 1 April 1997
G	12	(Israel)	DiBartolomeo, John (C)	1.83 m (6 ft 0 in)	79 kg (174 lb)	35 – 20 June 1991
G	17	(United States)	Wallace, Keaton	1.91 m (6 ft 3 in)	84 kg (185 lb)	27 – 26 February 1999
F/C	22	(Israel)	Leaf, T. J.	2.08 m (6 ft 10 in)	101 kg (223 lb)	29 – 30 April 1997
C	23	(Germany)	Theis, Daniel	2.03 m (6 ft 8 in)	111 kg (245 lb)	34 – 4 April 1992
PG	26	(Israel)	Madar, Yam	1.90 m (6 ft 3 in)	82 kg (181 lb)	25 – 21 December 2000
F/C	40	(United States) (Israel)	Hunter, Shane	2.08 m (6 ft 10 in)	94 kg (207 lb)	25 – 28 June 2001
PG	44	(Georgia (country))	Baldwin, Kamar	1.85 m (6 ft 1 in)	87 kg (192 lb)	29 – 15 September 1997
F	50	(United States)	Colson, Bonzie	1.98 m (6 ft 6 in)	102 kg (225 lb)	30 – 12 January 1996

Head coach

- (Israel) Oded Kattash

Assistant coach(es)

- (Israel) Guy Pnini
- (Israel) Noam Levi
- (Israel) Adi Amos

Athletic trainer(s)

- (Israel) Regev Fanan

General Manager

- (Italy) Claudio Coldebella

Professional Committee

- (Israel) David Blatt

Legend

- (C) Team captain
- Injured

- Roster

=== EuroLeague Depth chart ===
Pos.	Starting 5	Bench 1	Bench 2	Bench 3	Inactive
C	Roman Sorkin	Daniel Theis	Armando Bacot
PF	Jaylen Hoard	T. J. Leaf		Shane Hunter
SF	Oshae Brissett	Bonzie Colson	Will Rayman		Gur Lavy (injured)
SG	Jimmy Clark III	Keaton Wallace	John DiBartolomeo		Gabriel Lundberg (injured)
PG	Yam Madar	Kamar Baldwin		Amit Ebo

=== Ligat HaAl Depth chart ===
Pos.	Starting 5	Bench 1	Bench 2	Bench 3	Inactive
C	Roman Sorkin	Armando Bacot		Daniel Theis
PF	Jaylen Hoard	T. J. Leaf			Shane Hunter
SF	Bonzie Colson	Will Rayman	Nitay Dodo	Oshae Brissett	Gur Lavy (injured)
SG	Keaton Wallace	Jimmy Clark III			Gabriel Lundberg (injured)
PG	Yam Madar	Amit Ebo	John DiBartolomeo

(colors: Domestic players; foreign players; young players)

- The Israeli league rule requires every team to have at least one Israeli on the court at any time.
- There should be at least 7 Israelis and up to 5 foreigners on a 12-men game sheet.

=== Franchise leaders ===
Points scored in the EuroLeague

1. (Israel) Miki Berkovich – 3,588
2. (Israel) Doron Jamchi – 3,262
3. (United States) Kevin Magee – 2,081
4. (United States) (Israel) Aulcie Perry – 2,077
5. (United States) (Israel) Lou Silver – 1,999
6. (United States) Anthony Parker – 1,804
7. (United States) (Turkey) Scottie Wilbekin – 1,801
8. (United States) (Israel) Derrick Sharp – 1,755
9. (Croatia) Nikola Vujčić – 1,730
10. (United States) Devin Smith – 1,539
11. (Israel) Nadav Henefeld – 1,519
12. (United States) (Israel) Jim Boatwright – 1,481
13. (United States) (Israel) Tal Brody – 1,378
14. (United States) (Israel) David Blu – 1,244
15. (United States) (Israel) Earl Williams – 1,227
16. (Israel) Tal Burstein – 1,224

Points scored in the Israeli League

1. (Israel) Miki Berkovich – 6,060
2. (Israel) Tanhum Cohen-Mintz – 5,170
3. (Israel) Doron Jamchi – 4,896
4. (United States) (Israel) Tal Brody – 4,049
5. (United States) Kevin Magee – 3,215
6. (United States) (Israel) Lou Silver – 3,195
7. (Israel) Ralph Klein – 2,817
8. (United States) (Israel) Derrick Sharp – 2,664
9. (Israel) Nadav Henefeld – 2,438
10. (United States) (Israel) Jim Boatwright – 2,282
11. (Israel) Motti Daniel – 2,281
12. (United States) (Israel) Aulcie Perry – 2,171
13. (Israel) Motti Aroesti – 2,067
14. (Israel) Tal Burstein – 2,043
15. (Israel) Micha Schwartz – 1,963

== Honours and other achievements ==
Honours
Type	Competition	Titles	Seasons
International	EuroLeague	6	1976–77, 1980–81, 2000–01*, 2003–04, 2004–05, 2013–14
International	FIBA Intercontinental Cup	1	1980
Regional	ABA League	1	2011–12
Domestic	Israeli League	58	1953–54, 1954–55, 1956–57, 1957–58, 1958–59, 1961–62, 1962–63, 1963–64, 1966–67, 1967–68, 1969–70, 1970–71, 1971–72, 1972–73, 1973–74, 1974–75, 1975–76, 1976–77, 1977–78, 1978–79, 1979–80, 1980–81, 1981–82, 1982–83, 1983–84, 1984–85, 1985–86, 1986–87, 1987–88, 1988–89, 1989–90, 1990–91, 1991–92, 1993–94, 1994–95, 1995–96, 1996–97, 1997–98, 1998–99, 1999–2000, 2000–01, 2001–02, 2002–03, 2003–04, 2004–05, 2005–06, 2006–07, 2008–09, 2010–11, 2011–12, 2013–14, 2017–18, 2018–19, 2019–20, 2020–21, 2022–23, 2023–24, 2025–26
Domestic	Israeli Cup	46	1955–56, 1957–58, 1958–59, 1960–61, 1962–63, 1963–64, 1965–66, 1969–70, 1970–71, 1971–72, 1972–73, 1974–75, 1976–77, 1977–78, 1978–79, 1979–80, 1980–81, 1981–82, 1982–83, 1984–85, 1985–86, 1986–87, 1988–89, 1989–90, 1990–91, 1993–94, 1997–98, 1998–99, 1999–2000, 2000–01, 2001–02, 2002–03, 2003–04, 2004–05, 2005–06, 2009–10, 2010–11, 2011–12, 2012–13, 2013–14, 2014–15, 2015–16, 2016–17, 2020–21, 2024–25
Domestic	Israeli League Cup	11	2007, 2010, 2011, 2012, 2013, 2015, 2017, 2020, 2021, 2022, 2024

- Record title holders

=== Other Achievements ===
==== Trebles ====
- Triple Crown
  - Seasons (6): 1976–77, 1980–81, 2000–01, 2003–04, 2004–05, 2013–14

==== International competitions ====
- EuroLeague
  - Runners-up (9): 1979–80, 1981–82, 1986–87, 1987–88, 1988–89, 1999–00, 2005–06, 2007–08, 2010–11
  - Semifinalist (1): 2001–02
  - 3rd place (4): 1977–78, 1978–79, 1984–85, 1990–91
  - Final Four (12): 1988, 1989, 1991, 2000, 2001, 2002, 2004, 2005, 2006, 2008, 2011, 2014
- FIBA Saporta Cup (defunct)

Runners-up (1): 1966–67

- European Super Cup (semi-official, defunct)

Winners (1): 1991
3rd place (1): 1990

- Euroleague ULEB-FIBA Opening Tournament
  - Runners-up (1): 2001
- FIBA Intercontinental Cup
  - Runners-up (1): 2014
  - 3rd place (2): 1977, 1982
  - 4th place (1): 1987

==== Regional competitions ====
- ABA League
  - Runners-up (1): 2002–03

==== Domestic competitions ====
- Israeli League
  - Runners-up (7): 1959–60, 1960–61, 1965–66, 1968–69, 2007–08, 2009–10, 2012–13
- Israeli Cup
  - Runners-up (8): 1961–62, 1968–69, 1995–96, 1996–97, 2007–08, 2017–18, 2022–23, 2023–24
- Israeli League Cup
  - Runners-up (5): 2009, 2014, 2016, 2019, 2023

==== Other competitions ====
- FIBA International Christmas Tournament (defunct)

Winners (1): 2002
Runners-up (1): 1991
3rd place (1): 1990
4th place (2): 1989, 1992

- Tel Aviv, Israel Invitational Game:

Winners (5): 2009, 2010, 2011, 2015, 2020
Runners-up (1): 2016

- Alexandria, Thessaloniki Tournament:

Winners (1): 1991

- Bamberg, Germany Invitational Game:

Winners (1): 2009

- Frankfurt, Germany Invitational Game

Winners (1): 2009

- Wroclaw Invitational Tournament

Winners (1): 2010

- Tournoi d'Angers, France

Winners (1): 2011

- Bonn, Germany Invitational Game

Winners (1): 2014

- Gomelsky Cup

Runners-up (1): 2015

- Eilat, Israel Invitational Game

Winners (1): 2017

- Pro Stars Tournament

Winners (2): 2015, 2019

- America-Israel Cup

Runners-up (1): 1991

=== Individual club awards ===
- Triple Crown

Winners (6): 1976–77, 1980–81, 2000–01, 2003–04, 2004–05, 2013–14

== Matches against NBA teams ==
8 September 1978

Washington Bullets (United States)	97–98	(Israel) Maccabi Tel Aviv ^{*}

(Israel) Yad Eliyahu Arena, Tel Aviv

1981

Philadelphia 76ers (United States)	112–114	(Israel) Maccabi Tel Aviv

(Israel) Yad Eliyahu Arena, Tel Aviv

28 August 1984

New Jersey Nets (United States)	97–104	(Israel) Maccabi Tel Aviv

(Israel) Yad Eliyahu Arena, Tel Aviv

29 August 1984

Phoenix Suns (United States)	98–113	(Israel) Maccabi Tel Aviv

(Israel) Yad Eliyahu Arena, Tel Aviv

9 October 1988

Philadelphia 76ers (United States)	108–107	(Israel) Maccabi Tel Aviv

(United States) The Spectrum, Philadelphia

12 October 1989

Miami Heat (United States)	101–95	(Israel) Maccabi Tel Aviv

(United States) Miami Arena, Miami

16 October 1990

Report

Los Angeles Lakers (United States)	129–106	(Israel) Maccabi Tel Aviv

(United States) The Forum, Inglewood, California

24 October 1991

Los Angeles Clippers (United States)	146–112	(Israel) Maccabi Tel Aviv

(United States) San Diego Sports Arena, San Diego

27 October 1991

Report

Los Angeles Clippers (United States)	98–93	(Israel) Maccabi Tel Aviv

(United States) LA Memorial Sports Arena, Los Angeles

11 October 1999

Report

Miami Heat (United States)	126–91	(Israel) Maccabi Tel Aviv

(Israel) Yad Eliyahu Arena, Tel Aviv

16 October 2005

Report

Toronto Raptors (Canada)	103–105	(Israel) Maccabi Tel Aviv ^{**}

Air Canada Centre, Toronto

19 October 2005

Report

Orlando Magic (United States)	93–79	(Israel) Maccabi Tel Aviv

(United States) TD Waterhouse Centre, Orlando, Florida

8 October 2006

Boxscore

San Antonio Spurs (United States)	97–84	(Israel) Maccabi Tel Aviv

(France) Palais Omnisports de Paris-Bercy, Paris

11 October 2006

Boxscore

Phoenix Suns (United States)	119–102	(Israel) Maccabi Tel Aviv

(Germany) Kölnarena, Cologne

17 October 2006

Boxscore

Cleveland Cavaliers (United States)	93–67	(Israel) Maccabi Tel Aviv

(United States) Quicken Loans Arena, Cleveland, Ohio

19 October 2006

Boxscore

Toronto Raptors (Canada)	118–84	(Israel) Maccabi Tel Aviv

Air Canada Centre, Toronto

11 October 2007

Boxscore

New York Knicks (United States)	112–85	(Israel) Maccabi Tel Aviv

(United States) Madison Square Garden, New York City

18 October 2009

Boxscore

New York Knicks (United States)	106–91	(Israel) Maccabi Tel Aviv

(United States) Madison Square Garden, New York City

20 October 2009

Boxscore

Los Angeles Clippers (United States)	108–96	(Israel) Maccabi Tel Aviv

(United States) Staples Center, Los Angeles

5 October 2014

Boxscore

Cleveland Cavaliers (United States)	107–80	(Israel) Maccabi Tel Aviv

(United States) Quicken Loans Arena, Cleveland, Ohio

7 October 2014

Boxscore

Brooklyn Nets (United States)	111–94	(Israel) Maccabi Tel Aviv

(United States) Barclays Center, Brooklyn, New York City

Notes:

^* First European team to defeat an NBA team.
^** First European team to defeat an NBA team on North American soil.

The club's website also offers a narrative about their history vs NBA teams, as well as their first victory in 1978.

== Notable players ==
Note: Flags indicate national team eligibility at FIBA-sanctioned events. Players may hold other non-FIBA nationalities not displayed.

Criteria

To appear in this section a player must have either:

- Set a club record or won an individual award while at the club
- Played at least one official international match for their national team at any time
- Played at least one official NBA match at any time.

Bold indicates Maccabi Hall of Famers (Sources: maccabi.co.il, )

2020s

- (France) Jaylen Hoard 1 seasons: '24 - '25
- (Lithuania) Rokas Jokubaitis 1 seasons: '24– '25
- (United States) Bonzie Colson 2 seasons: ‘22 - ‘24
- (United States) (Slovenia) Josh Nebo 2 seasons: ‘22 - ‘24
- (United States) (Spain) Lorenzo Brown 2 seasons: ‘22 - ‘24
- (United States) Scottie Wilbekin 4 seasons: ‘18 - ‘22
- (United States) Wade Baldwin IV 2 seasons: ‘23 - ‘24
- (Croatia) Ante Zizic 2 seasons: ‘20 - '22
- (United States) Derrick Williams 1 seasons: ‘21 - '22

2010s

- (Greece) (United States) Tyler Dorsey 2 seasons: '19-'21
- (United States) Elijah Bryant 2 seasons: '19-'21
- (United States) (Liberia) Othello Hunter 2 seasons: '19-'21
- (United States) Nate Wolters 2 seasons: '19-'20
- (United States) Tarik Black 2 seasons: '18-'20
- (United States) Johnny O'Bryant III 1 season: '18-'19
- (Israel) (Serbia) Deni Avdija 3 seasons: '17-'20
- (United States) (Hungary) DeAndre Kane 2 seasons: '17-'19
- (United States) (Tunisia) Michael Roll 2 seasons: '17-'19
- (Australia) Jonah Bolden 1 season: '17-'18
- (United States) Deshaun Thomas 1 season: '17-'18
- (United States) Norris Cole 1 season: '17-'18
- (United States) Pierre Jackson 1 season: '17-'18
- (United States) Andrew Goudelock 1 season: '16-'17
- (Israel) Yovel Zoosman 5 seasons: '15-'21
- (United States) Brian Randle 2 seasons: '14-'16
- (United States) (Montenegro) Tyrese Rice 1 season: '13-'14
- (Australia) Joe Ingles 1 season: '13-'14
- (United States) (Israel) Alex Tyus 4 seasons: '13-'15, '17-'19
- (United States) (Georgia (country)) Ricky Hickman 2 seasons: '12-'14
- (Israel) Itay Segev 4 seasons: '12-'13, '15-'18
- (United States) (Israel) Sylven Landesberg 5 seasons: '12-'17
- (United States) **Devin Smith** 6 seasons: '11-'17
- (Israel) Yogev Ohayon 6 seasons: '11-'17
- (United States) Shawn James 3 seasons: '11-'14
- (United States) (Israel) Jordan Farmar 2 seasons: '11, '15-'16
- (United States) Keith Langford 1 season: '11-'12
- (Greece) Sofoklis Schortsanitis 4 seasons: '10-'12, '13-'15
- (United States) Jeremy Pargo 4 seasons: '10-'11, '14-'15, '18-'19
- (United States) (North Macedonia) Richard Hendrix 3 seasons: '10-'12, '16

2000s

- (Israel) Gal Mekel 3 seasons: '09-'10, '16-'17
- (Israel) Guy Pnini 8 seasons: '09-17
- (United States) Doron Perkins 2 seasons: '09-'11
- (United States) Chuck Eidson 2 seasons: '09-'11
- (United States) Alan Anderson 1 season: '09-'10
- (United States) (Israel) D'or Fischer 2 seasons: '08-'10
- (Puerto Rico) Carlos Arroyo 1 season: '08-'09
- (United States) Marcus Brown 1 season: '08-'09
- (United States) Terence Morris 1 season: '07-'08
- (Israel) Lior Eliyahu 6 seasons: '06-'09, '10-'13
- (United States) Will Bynum 2 seasons: '06-'08
- (Israel) Omri Casspi 5 seasons: '05-'09, '19-21
- (United States) (Israel) Jamie Arnold 2 seasons: '05-'07
- (Israel) Yaniv Green 6 seasons: '04-'07, '08-'11
- (United States) Maceo Baston 3 seasons: '03-'06
- (United States) Will Solomon 1 season: '05-'06
- (Lithuania) **Šarūnas Jasikevičius** 2 seasons: '03-'05
- (United States) (Israel) Deon Thomas 2 seasons: '03-'05
- (United States) (Israel) **David Blu** 7 seasons: '02-'04, '07-'08, '09-'14
- (Croatia) **Nikola Vujčić** 6 seasons: '02-'08
- (Slovenia) Beno Udrih 1 season: '02-'03
- (Israel) Yotam Halperin 6 seasons: '01-'05, '06-'08
- (Israel) **Tal Burstein** 11 seasons: '00-'09, '10-'12
- (United States) **Anthony Parker** 5 seasons: '00-'02, '03-'06

1990s

- (United States) **Nate Huffman** 3 seasons: '99-'02
- (United States) (Slovenia) **Ariel McDonald** 3 seasons: '99-'02
- (United States) (Israel) Mark Brisker 3 seasons: '99-'02
- (Israel) **Gur Shelef** 7 seasons: '98-'05
- (United States) Rashard Griffith 1 season: '97-'98
- (United States) (Israel) **Derrick Sharp** 15 seasons: '96-'11
- (Israel) **Doron Sheffer** 5 seasons: '96-'00, '02-'03
- (Romania) (Israel) Constantin Popa 4 seasons: '96-'00
- (Montenegro) (Israel) Velibor Radović 4 seasons: '96-'99, '00-'01
- (United States) Randy White 2 seasons: '96-'98
- (Israel) **Oded Kattash** 4 seasons: '95-'99
- (United States) (Israel) Brad Leaf 3 seasons: '95-'98
- (United States) Tom Chambers 1 season: '95-'96
- (Serbia) (Israel) Radisav Ćurčić 4 seasons: '94-'96, '00-'02
- (United States) Wendell Alexis 1 season: '93-'94
- (United States) David Ancrum 1 season: '92-'93
- (Israel) **Nadav Henefeld** 12 seasons: '91-'02
- (Israel) **Guy Goodes** 8 seasons: '90-'97, '98-'99

1980s

- (United States) (Israel) LaVon Mercer 6 seasons: '88-'94
- (Israel) **Motti Daniel** 9 seasons: '87-'96
- (United States) (Israel) **Willie Sims** 5 seasons: '87-'92
- (United States) Ken Barlow 3 season: '87-'90
- (Israel) **Doron Jamchi** 12 seasons: '85-'96, '99-'00
- (United States) **Kevin Magee** 6 season: '84-'90
- (United States) Lee Johnson 3 season: '84-'87
- (Israel) **Hen Lippin** 9 season: '83-'92
- (United States) (Israel) Howard Lassoff 6 season: '81-'87

1970s

- (United States) (Israel) **Earl Williams** 4 seasons: '79-'83
- (Israel) Shmuel Zysman 3 seasons: '78-'81
- (United States) (Israel) **Aulcie Perry** 9 seasons: '76-'85
- (Israel) Shuki Schwartz 5 seasons: '76-'81
- (United States) (Israel) **Lou Silver** 10 seasons: '75-'85
- (United States) (Israel) Bob Griffin 3 seasons: '75-'78
- (Israel) **Motti Aroesti** 14 seasons: '74-'88
- (United States) (Israel) **Jim Boatwright** 8 seasons: '74-'82
- (United States) (Israel) Eric Minkin 6 seasons: '73-'79
- (Israel) **Miki Berkovich** 16 seasons: '71-'88
- (United States) (Israel) Ronald Green 2 seasons: '70-'71

1950–60s

- (Israel) Gabi Noimark 8 seasons: '67-'75
- (Israel) Micha Schwartz 9 seasons: '67-'76
- (United States) (Israel) **Tal Brody** 14 seasons: '66-'80
- (Israel) Avraham Hoffman 5 seasons: '63-'68
- (Israel) **Haim Shtarkman** 13 seasons: '63-'76
- (Israel) **Amnon Avidan** 9 seasons: '62-'71
- (Israel) Shabtai Ben-Basat 9 seasons: '57-'69
- (Israel) **Tanhum Cohen-Mintz** 14 seasons: '58-'72
- (Israel) **Abraham Shneior** 5 seasons: '54-'59
- (Israel) **Ralph Klein** 12 seasons: '53-'65

== Notable head coaches ==
- (United States) Rudy D'Amico
- (United States) (Israel) David Blatt
- (Israel) Yehoshua Rozin
- (Israel) Ralph Klein
- (Israel) Zvi Sherf
- (Israel) Pini Gershon
