= 1980 FIBA Intercontinental Cup =

- League: FIBA Intercontinental Cup
- Sport: Basketball
- Duration: October 1–5, 1980
- Finals champions: (Israel) Maccabi Elite
- Runners-up: (Brazil) Atlética Francana

FIBA Intercontinental Cup seasons
- ← 1979 FIBA Intercontinental Cup 1981 FIBA Club World Cup →

The 1980 FIBA Intercontinental Cup William Jones was the 14th edition of the FIBA Intercontinental Cup for men's basketball clubs. It took place October 1–5, 1980 at Skenderija, Sarajevo, Yugoslavia.

== Participants ==
Continent	Teams	Clubs		
Europe	3	(Spain) Real Madrid	(Israel) Maccabi Elite	(Socialist Federal Republic of Yugoslavia) Bosna
North America	1	(United States) Kansas All-Stars		
South America	1	(Brazil) Atlética Francana		

== League stage ==
Day 1, October 1, 1980

Team 1	Score	Team 2
Bosna (Socialist Federal Republic of Yugoslavia)	111–93	(United States) Kansas All-Stars
Real Madrid (Spain)	106–98	(Israel) Maccabi Elite

Day 2, October 2, 1980

Team 1	Score	Team 2
Bosna (Socialist Federal Republic of Yugoslavia)	84–88	(Israel) Maccabi Elite
Kansas All-Stars (United States)	74–86	(Brazil) Atlética Francana

Day 3, October 3, 1980

Team 1	Score	Team 2
Atlética Francana (Brazil)	116–73	(Spain) Real Madrid
Maccabi Elite (Israel)	94–85	(United States) Kansas All-Stars

Day 4, October 4, 1980

Team 1	Score	Team 2
Maccabi Elite (Israel)	88–74	(Brazil) Atlética Francana
Bosna (Socialist Federal Republic of Yugoslavia)	93–91	(Spain) Real Madrid

Day 5, October 5, 1980

Team 1	Score	Team 2
Bosna (Socialist Federal Republic of Yugoslavia)	80–81	(Brazil) Atlética Francana
Kansas All-Stars (United States)	92–104	(Spain) Real Madrid

== Final standings ==
	Team	Pld	Pts	W	L	PF	PA
1.	(Israel) Maccabi Elite	4	7	3	1	368	349
2.	(Brazil) Atlética Francana	4	7	3	1	357	315
3.	(Socialist Federal Republic of Yugoslavia) Bosna	4	6	2	2	368	353
4.	(Spain) Real Madrid	4	6	2	2	374	399
5.	(United States) Kansas All-Stars	4	4	0	4	344	395

1980 Intercontinental Champions

Maccabi Elite
1st title

== Sources ==
- 1980 Edition
