= 2000 FIBA EuroLeague Final Four =

Club basketball tournament in Thessaloniki, Greece

- Season: 1999–2000 FIBA EuroLeague

Tournament details
- Arena: P.A.O.K. Sports Arena; Thessaloniki, Greece
- Dates: 18–20 April 2000

Final positions
- Champions: (Greece) Panathinaikos (2nd title)
- Runners-up: (Israel) Maccabi Elite Tel Aviv
- Third place: (Turkey) Efes Pilsen
- Fourth place: (Spain) FC Barcelona

Awards and statistics
- MVP: (Federal Republic of Yugoslavia) Željko Rebrača

The 2000 FIBA EuroLeague Final Four was the FIBA EuroLeague Final Four tournament of the 1999–2000 season. It was the second to last edition of the FIBA EuroLeague Final Fours that were organized by FIBA Europe. For the next edition of the tournament, it would be replaced by the FIBA SuproLeague's 2001 FIBA SuproLeague Final Four, and the new Euroleague Basketball competition's 2001 Finals series, which was organized by the Euroleague Basketball Company.

Panathinaikos won its second title, after defeating Maccabi Elite Tel Aviv in the final game.

== Bracket ==
Semi-finals
(Spain) FC Barcelona	51
(Israel) Maccabi Elite Tel Aviv	65
(Greece) Panathinaikos	81
(Turkey) Efes Pilsen	71

Final
(Israel) Maccabi Elite Tel Aviv	67
(Greece) Panathinaikos	73
Third place
(Spain) FC Barcelona	69
(Turkey) Efes Pilsen	75

== Semifinals ==
=== FC Barcelona – Maccabi Elite Tel Aviv ===
April 18
18:30

Boxscore

FC Barcelona (Spain)	51–65	(Israel) Maccabi Elite Tel Aviv
Scoring by half: 22–38, 29–27
Pts: Goldwire 13; Rebs: Dueñas 9 Asts: Alston, Goldwire 3		Pts: Huffman 24; Rebs: Henefeld 6 Asts: McDonald 4

P.A.O.K. Sports Arena, Thessaloniki
Attendance: 8,000
Referees: Romualdas Brazauskas (LTU), Carl Jungebrand (FIN)

=== Panathinaikos – Efes Pilsen ===
April 18
21:00

Boxscore

Panathinaikos (Greece)	81–71	(Turkey) Efes Pilsen
Scoring by half: 41–33, 40–38
Pts: Bodiroga 22; Rebs: Rebrača 7 Asts: Bodiroga, Kattash 3		Pts: Türkoğlu 15; Rebs: Beşok, Türkoğlu 5 Asts: Mulaomerović 6

P.A.O.K. Sports Arena, Thessaloniki
Attendance: 8,000
Referees: Stefano Cazzaro (ITA), Iztok Rems (SLO)

== Third-place game ==
April 20
18:30

Boxscore

FC Barcelona (Spain)	69–75	(Turkey) Efes Pilsen
Scoring by half: 34–41, 35–34
Pts: Rentzias 29; Rebs: Elson 11; Asts: Rodríguez 5		Pts: Beşok 22; Rebs: Beşok 10; Asts: three players 2

P.A.O.K. Sports Arena, Thessaloniki
Attendance: 8,000
Referees: Stefano Cazzaro (ITA), Carl Jungebrand (FIN)

== Final ==
April 20
21:00

Boxscore

Maccabi Elite Tel Aviv (Israel)	67–73	(Greece) Panathinaikos
Scoring by half: 36–36, 31–37
Pts: Huffman 26; Rebs: Huffman 10; Asts: Comegys 3		Pts: Rebrača 20; Rebs: Rebrača 8 Asts: Bodiroga, Kattash 2

P.A.O.K. Sports Arena, Thessaloniki
Attendance: 8,500
Referees: Romualdas Brazauskas (LTU), Iztok Rems (SLO)

Maccabi Elite Tel Aviv	Panathinaikos

Starters:			P	R	A
PG	14	(Slovenia) Ariel McDonald	11	3	1
PG	6	(Israel) Derrick Sharp	5	0	1
SF	4	(Israel) Nadav Henefeld (C)	0	1	0
PF	8	(United States) Dallas Comegys	3	5	3
C	7	(United States) Nate Huffman	26	10	2
Reserves:			P	R	A
SG	5	(Israel) Mark Brisker	13	3	0
SF	9	(Israel) Gur Shelef	0	1	0
G	11	(Israel) Doron Sheffer	6	2	2
G	12	(Israel) Doron Jamchy	3	1	0
C	15	(Romania) Constantin Popa	0	0	0
Head coach:
(Israel) Pini Gershon

1999–2000 FIBA EuroLeague
Champions

Panathinaikos
Second title

Starters:			P	R	A
PG	9	(Italy) Nando Gentile	3	2	1
SG	10	(Federal Republic of Yugoslavia) Dejan Bodiroga	9	4	2
SF	4	(Greece) Fragiskos Alvertis (C)	4	3	0
PF	7	(Spain) Johnny Rogers	4	2	1
C	12	(Federal Republic of Yugoslavia) Željko Rebrača	20	8	0
Reserves:			P	R	A
SG	6	(Germany) Michael Koch	0	0	0
PF	8	(Greece) Antonis Fotsis	9	5	0
PG	11	(Greece) Nikos Boudouris	DNP		
C	13	(Republic of Ireland) Pat Burke	7	3	0
PG	14	(Israel) Oded Kattash	17	1	2
Head coach:
(Federal Republic of Yugoslavia) Željko Obradović

== Awards ==
=== FIBA EuroLeague Final Four MVP ===
- (Federal Republic of Yugoslavia) Željko Rebrača ( (Greece) Panathinaikos)

=== FIBA EuroLeague Finals Top Scorer ===
- (United States) Nate Huffman ( (Israel) Maccabi Elite Tel Aviv)

=== FIBA EuroLeague All-Final Four Team ===
FIBA EuroLeague All-Final Four Team
Player	Team	Ref.
(Israel) Oded Kattash	Panathinaikos	
(Turkey) Hedo Türkoğlu	Efes Pilsen	
(Federal Republic of Yugoslavia) Dejan Bodiroga	Panathinaikos	
(United States) Nate Huffman	Maccabi Elite Tel Aviv	
(Federal Republic of Yugoslavia) Željko Rebrača (MVP)	Panathinaikos	
