= FIBA SuproLeague awards =

Basketball awards

The FIBA SuproLeague awards were given out by the FIBA SuproLeague professional basketball competition, during the 2000–01 season. The league was run by FIBA Europe, which also handed out the awards.

During the 2000–01 season, the top professional men's basketball club competition in Europe was split into two leagues. The EuroLeague 2000–01 season, which was organized by the EuroLeague Basketball Company, and the FIBA SuproLeague 2000–01 season, which was organized by FIBA Europe. This happened after the EuroLeague Basketball Company took over the main control of Europe's premier basketball competition in 2000 from FIBA Europe.

A few of the top clubs of the EuroLeague, decided initially not to break away from FIBA Europe, and so a new version of FIBA's EuroLeague was formed, called the FIBA SuproLeague. It continued the tradition of having the league culminate at the EuroLeague Final Four, with the 2001 FIBA SuproLeague Final Four. On the other hand, the EuroLeague Basketball competition did not hold an edition of the EuroLeague Final Four that season, opting instead to end the season with the 2001 EuroLeague Finals.

After the 2000–01 season, all of the top basketball clubs of Europe decided to join with EuroLeague Basketball, and the FIBA version of the league officially ended with the 2000–01 FIBA SuproLeague. The next season's edition of the EuroLeague, the EuroLeague 2001–02 season, cancelled the 5-game finals series format, and continued the long-held tradition of culminating with the EuroLeague Final Four. It also continued to give out the EuroLeague Final Four MVP award. However, it also discontinued the awarding of the EuroLeague All-Final Four Team, making the 2001 FIBA SuproLeague Final Four, the last time that the EuroLeague All-Final Four Team award was given.

== FIBA SuproLeague Player of the Year ==
Season	Position	Player of the Year	Team	Ref.
2000–01	Center	(United States) Nate Huffman	Maccabi Elite	

== FIBA SuproLeague Final Four MVP ==
Season	Position	Final Four MVP	Team	Ref.
2000–01	Point guard	(United States) (Slovenia) Ariel McDonald	Maccabi Elite	

== FIBA SuproLeague Top Scorer ==
Season	Position	Top scorer	Team	PPG	Ref.
2000–01	Shooting guard	(Federal Republic of Yugoslavia) Miroslav Berić	Partizan	23.3	

== FIBA SuproLeague Finals Top Scorer ==
Season	Position	Finals Top Scorer	Team	Ref.
2000–01	Small forward	(Federal Republic of Yugoslavia) Dejan Bodiroga	Panathinaikos	

== FIBA SuproLeague All-Final Four Team ==
FIBA SuproLeague All-Final Four Team
Year	Player	Team	Ref
2001	(Federal Republic of Yugoslavia) Dejan Bodiroga	Panathinaikos	
2001	(United States) Nate Huffman	Maccabi Tel Aviv	
2001	(Russia) Andrei Kirilenko	CSKA Moscow	
2001	(United States) (Slovenia) Ariel McDonald (Final Four MVP)	Maccabi Tel Aviv	
2001	(United States) Anthony Parker	Maccabi Tel Aviv	

== See also ==
- FIBA SuproLeague
- EuroLeague Awards
- EuroLeague MVP
- EuroLeague Final Four MVP
- All-EuroLeague Team
- EuroLeague All-Final Four Team
