= 1999–2000 FIBA EuroLeague =

European basketball competition

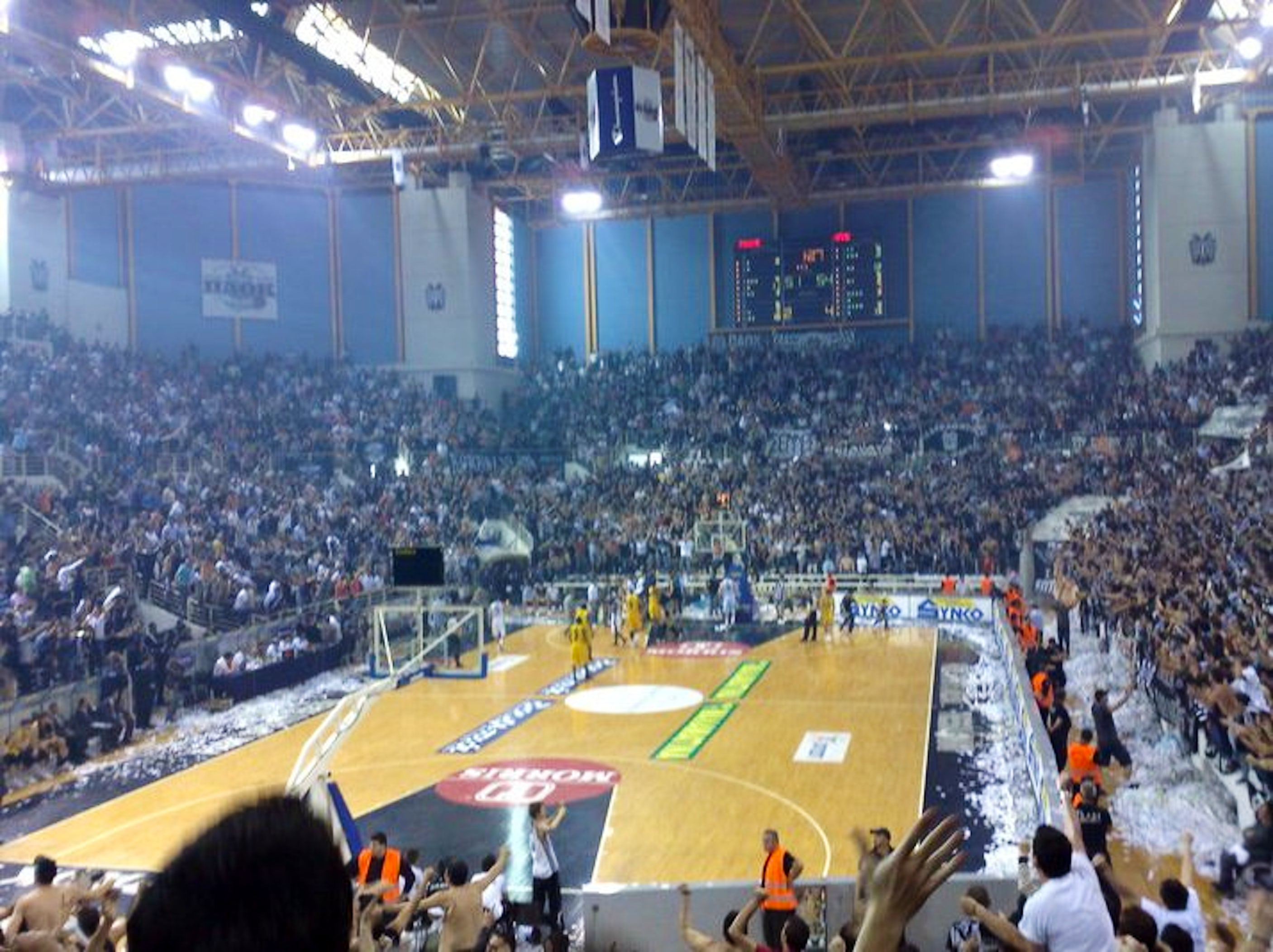
- The Final Four was hosted at the PAOK Sports Arena
- Season: 1999–2000
- Duration: 23 September 1999 – 20 April 2000
- Teams: 24

Finals
- Champions: (Greece) Panathinaikos (2nd title)
- Runners-up: (Israel) Maccabi Elite Tel Aviv
- Third place: (Turkey) Efes Pilsen
- Fourth place: (Spain) FC Barcelona
- Final Four MVP: (Federal Republic of Yugoslavia) Željko Rebrača

Statistical leaders
Points	(Slovenia) Miljan Goljović	20.2
Rebounds	(Turkey) Hüseyin Beşok	10.0
Assists	(United States) David Rivers	4.9

The 1999–2000 FIBA EuroLeague was the 43rd installment of the European top-tier level professional club competition for basketball clubs (now called simply EuroLeague). It began on September 23, 1999, and ended on April 20, 2000. The competition's Final Four was held at PAOK Sports Arena, Thessaloniki, with Panathinaikos defeating Maccabi Elite Tel Aviv in the EuroLeague Final, in front of 8,500 spectators.

Efes Pilsen finished in the third position, and FC Barcelona finished fourth.

== Competition system ==
- 24 teams (the national domestic league champions from the best leagues, and a variable number of other clubs from the most important national domestic leagues). The competition culminated in a Final Four.

== Country ranking ==
For the 1999–2000 EuroLeague, the countries are allocated places according to their place on the FIBA country rankings, which takes into account their performance in European competitions from 1996–97 to 1998–99.

Country ranking for 1999–2000 FIBA EuroLeague

Rank	Country	Points	Teams	Notes
1	Italy	237.667	3	
2	Greece	179.167	3	
3	Spain	150.167	3	
4	Turkey	70.500	3	
5	France	68.833	2	+1, Cholet got wild card
6	Lithuania	55.556	2	-1, Lietuvos rytas withdrew
7	FR Yugoslavia	54.500	2	
8	Russia	35.695	2	Lost one berth
9	Slovenia	30.622	1	+1, Pivovarna got wild card
10	Germany	27.833	1	
11	Croatia	25.542	1	
12	Israel	22.108	1	
13	Poland	20.714	0	
14	Belgium	13.817	0	
15	Portugal	13.762	0	
16	Ukraine	6.143	0	
17	Austria	4.559	0	
18	Hungary	4.429	0	
19	North Macedonia	4.375	0	

Rank	Country	Points	Teams	Notes
20	Cyprus	3.528	0	
21	Czech Republic	3.187	0	
22	Bosnia and Herzegovina	3.008	0	
23	Finland	2.917	0	
24	Slovakia	2.583	0	
25	Latvia	2.302	0	
26	Bulgaria	1.917	0	
27	Netherlands	1.722	0	
28	Sweden	1.667	0	
29	Estonia	0.667	0	
30	Romania	0.611	0	
31	Luxembourg	0.472	0	
32	Switzerland	0.389	0	
33	Georgia	0.333	0	
34	England	0.278	0	
35	Belarus	0.111	0	
36	Albania	0.055	0	
37	Denmark	0.000	0	
38	Ireland	0.000	0	

Note

1. FIBA: In Euroleague, teams finishing 6th in the Second Stage of 1998–99 FIBA EuroLeague (groups E-H) lose a berth for their country in next season. These berths are gained by those countries whose teams reach the Semi-Final Round in the 1998–99 FIBA Saporta Cup. As a general rule, a federation cannot have more than 3 teams in Euroleague. Should a semi-finalist in Saporta Cup provide one more berth for its country, in case it already has 3 berths assigned in Euroleague, this berth will be transferred to the next federation in FIBA Ranking which has 2 teams (as long as one of its teams reached the 1/4 Final Round in Saporta Cup during the same season)..

=== Team allocation ===
The labels in the parentheses show how each team qualified for the place of its starting round:

- 1st, 2nd, 3rd, etc.: League position after Playoffs
- WC: Wild card

Regular season
(Italy) Varese Roosters (1st)	(Spain) FC Barcelona (1st)	(France) Pau-Orthez (1st)	(Slovenia) Union Olimpija (1st)
(Italy) Benetton Treviso (2nd)	(Spain) Caja San Fernando (2nd)	(France) ASVEL (2nd)	(Slovenia) Pivovarna Laško (WC)
(Italy) Paf Wennington Bologna (3rd)	(Spain) Real Madrid Teka (3rd)	(France) Cholet (WC)	(Russia) CSKA Moscow (1st)
(Greece) Panathinaikos (1st)	(Turkey) Tofaş (1st)	(Federal Republic of Yugoslavia) Budućnost (1st)	(Germany) Alba Berlin (1st)
(Greece) Olympiacos (2nd)	(Turkey) Efes Pilsen (2nd)	(Federal Republic of Yugoslavia) Crvena zvezda (2nd)	(Croatia) Cibona VIP (1st)
(Greece) PAOK (3rd)	(Turkey) Ülker (3rd)	(Lithuania) Žalgiris (1st)	(Israel) Maccabi Elite Tel Aviv (1st)

== Preliminary round ==
=== Group A ===
Pos	Team	Pld	W	L	PF	PA	PD	Pts	Qualification	FCB	CSK	BEN	PAO	CHO	CZV
1	(Spain) FC Barcelona	10	9	1	780	685	+95	19	Advance to Group E	—	75–67	69–51	76–55	71–62	90–67
2	(Russia) CSKA Moscow	10	7	3	754	705	+49	17	Advance to Group E	76–72	—	77–75	71–82	74–54	86–62
3	(Italy) Benetton Treviso	10	6	4	700	675	+25	16	Advance to Group E	68–72	61–81	—	69–66	73–57	88–63
4	(Greece) PAOK	10	5	5	730	680	+50	15	Advance to Group F	83–87	83–63	66–72	—	83–76	82–53
5	(France) Cholet	10	2	8	640	711	−71	12	Advance to Group F	70–77	76–79	64–73	48–66	—	69–59
6	(Federal Republic of Yugoslavia) Crvena zvezda	10	1	9	636	784	−148	11	Advance to Group F	86–91	65–80	60–70	65–64	56–64	—

Source: FIBA Europe
Legend: Blue = home team win; Red = away team win.

=== Group B ===
Pos	Team	Pld	W	L	PF	PA	PD	Pts	Qualification	PAN	UOL	RMB	ALB	TOF	ZAL
1	(Greece) Panathinaikos	10	9	1	802	690	+112	19	Advance to Group F	—	100–80	96–69	70–72	79–74	86–82
2	(Slovenia) Union Olimpija	10	5	5	776	791	−15	15	Advance to Group F	71–86	—	73–63	78–83	87–92	76–64
3	(Spain) Real Madrid Teka	10	5	5	714	743	−29	15	Advance to Group F	63–66	76–74	—	90–75	77–73	60–70
4	(Germany) Alba Berlin	10	5	5	734	747	−13	15	Advance to Group E	54–73	69–74	84–78	—	81–55	80–64
5	(Turkey) Tofaş	10	4	6	715	738	−23	14	Advance to Group E	59–64	74–78	67–71	76–66	—	77–73
6	(Lithuania) Žalgiris	10	2	8	719	751	−32	12	Advance to Group E	66–82	84–85	65–67	89–70	62–68	—

Source: FIBA Europe
Legend: Blue = home team win; Red = away team win.

=== Group C ===
Pos	Team	Pld	W	L	PF	PA	PD	Pts	Qualification	ASV	OLY	MTA	ULK	VAR	PIV
1	(France) ASVEL	10	8	2	711	645	+66	18	Advance to Group G	—	61–54	70–65	60–59	84–71	100–58
2	(Greece) Olympiacos	10	6	4	668	627	+41	16	Advance to Group G	65–55	—	65–63	62–73	62–69	79–68
3	(Israel) Maccabi Elite Tel Aviv	10	6	4	773	714	+59	16	Advance to Group G	73–61	54–65	—	89–74	87–66	84–62
4	(Turkey) Ülker	10	5	5	756	770	−14	15	Advance to Group H	73–80	64–86	85–79	—	79–70	68–78
5	(Italy) Varese Roosters	10	3	7	715	762	−47	13	Advance to Group H	58–60	57–74	79–87	82–86	—	80–70
6	(Slovenia) Pivovarna Laško	10	2	8	712	817	−105	12	Advance to Group H	69–80	63–56	87–92	84–95	73–83	—

Source: FIBA Europe
Legend: Blue = home team win; Red = away team win.

=== Group D ===
Pos	Team	Pld	W	L	PF	PA	PD	Pts	Qualification	EFS	CIB	PAF	BUD	CSF	PAU
1	(Turkey) Efes Pilsen	10	6	4	707	678	+29	16	Advance to Group H	—	69–60	99–63	73–67	73–57	69–65
2	(Croatia) Cibona VIP	10	6	4	744	759	−15	16	Advance to Group H	71–69	—	71–61	69–63	93–87	71–69
3	(Italy) Paf Wennington Bologna	10	6	4	729	703	+26	16	Advance to Group H	76–56	92–78	—	72–73	69–63	83–58
4	(Federal Republic of Yugoslavia) Budućnost	10	5	5	760	746	+14	15	Advance to Group G	86–80	95–90	75–83	—	88–65	68–71
5	(Spain) Caja San Fernando	10	5	5	699	689	+10	15	Advance to Group G	62–43	79–59	60–52	75–73	—	77–60
6	(France) Pau-Orthez	10	2	8	686	750	−64	12	Advance to Group G	71–76	75–82	70–78	68–72	79–74	—

Source: FIBA Europe
Legend: Blue = home team win; Red = away team win.

== Qualification round ==
(The individual scores and standings of the First stage were accumulated in the Second stage)

If one or more clubs were level on won-lost record, tiebreakers were applied in the following order:

1. Head-to-head record in matches between the tied clubs
2. Overall point difference in games between the tied clubs
3. Overall point difference in all group matches (first tiebreaker if tied clubs were not in the same group)
4. Points scored in all group matches
5. Sum of quotients of points scored and points allowed in each group match

=== Group E ===
Pos	Team	Pld	W	L	PF	PA	PD	Pts	Qualification	FCB	CSK	BEN	ALB	TOF	ZAL
1	(Spain) FC Barcelona	16	12	4	1183	1091	+92	28	Advance to Play Offs	—			66–67	68–65	66–64
2	(Russia) CSKA Moscow	16	9	7	1216	1182	+34	25	Advance to Play Offs		—		71–76	90–85	76–64
3	(Italy) Benetton Treviso	16	9	7	1156	1139	+17	25	Advance to Play Offs			—	86–78	66–77	88–75
4	(Germany) Alba Berlin	16	9	7	1174	1186	−12	25	Advance to Play Offs	72–64	81–76	66–76	—		
5	(Turkey) Tofaş	16	8	8	1193	1171	+22	24		78–71	87–73	86–65		—	
6	(Lithuania) Žalgiris	16	4	12	1148	1200	−52	20		60–68	84–76	82–75			—

Source: FIBA Europe
Legend: Blue = home team win; Red = away team win.

=== Group F ===
Pos	Team	Pld	W	L	PF	PA	PD	Pts	Qualification	PAN	UOL	RMB	PAK	CHO	CZV
1	(Greece) Panathinaikos	16	13	3	1246	1084	+162	29	Advance to Play Offs	—			71–75	85–50	67–58
2	(Slovenia) Union Olimpija	16	10	6	1201	1175	+26	26	Advance to Play Offs		—		69–63	69–55	59–47
3	(Spain) Real Madrid Teka	16	10	6	1227	1187	+40	26	Advance to Play Offs			—	72–61	86–79	98–78
4	(Greece) PAOK	16	7	9	1140	1114	+26	23	Advance to Play Offs	69–77	70–74	72–71	—		
5	(France) Cholet	16	3	13	1054	1186	−132	19		81–68	66–77	83–90		—	
6	(Federal Republic of Yugoslavia) Crvena zvezda	16	2	14	1034	1257	−223	18		61–76	83–77	71–96			—

Source: FIBA Europe
Legend: Blue = home team win; Red = away team win.

=== Group G ===
Pos	Team	Pld	W	L	PF	PA	PD	Pts	Qualification	MTA	ASV	OLY	BUD	CSF	PAU
1	(Israel) Maccabi Elite Tel Aviv	16	12	4	1182	1050	+132	28	Advance to Play Offs	—			74–60	66–54	65–55
2	(France) ASVEL	16	11	5	1107	1056	+51	27	Advance to Play Offs		—		57–83	75–64	76–61
3	(Greece) Olympiacos	16	10	6	1117	1045	+72	26	Advance to Play Offs			—	89–61	74–63	77–73
4	(Federal Republic of Yugoslavia) Budućnost	16	7	9	1164	1168	−4	23	Advance to Play Offs	59–67	59–65	82–70	—		
5	(Spain) Caja San Fernando	16	6	10	1068	1107	−39	22		51–75	72–62	65–66		—	
6	(France) Pau-Orthez	16	4	12	1078	1164	−86	20		57–62	72–61	74–73			—

Source: FIBA Europe
Legend: Blue = home team win; Red = away team win.

=== Group H ===
Pos	Team	Pld	W	L	PF	PA	PD	Pts	Qualification	EFS	PAF	CIB	ULK	VAR	PIV
1	(Turkey) Efes Pilsen	16	11	5	1221	1142	+79	27	Advance to Play Offs	—			95–74	84–74	78–68
2	(Italy) Paf Wennington Bologna	16	10	6	1198	1145	+53	26	Advance to Play Offs		—		79–53	91–82	81–63
3	(Croatia) Cibona VIP	16	10	6	1201	1207	−6	26	Advance to Play Offs			—	64–81	75–59	88–80
4	(Turkey) Ülker	16	8	8	1204	1235	−31	24	Advance to Play Offs	93–87	76–68	71–72	—		
5	(Italy) Varese Roosters	16	5	11	1186	1240	−54	21		76–79	91–72	89–77		—	
6	(Slovenia) Pivovarna Laško	16	2	14	1147	1314	−167	18		79–91	77–78	68–81			—

Source: FIBA Europe
Legend: Blue = home team win; Red = away team win.

== Play Offs ==
=== Bracket ===
Teams in bold advanced to the next round. The numbers to the left of each team indicate the team's seeding, the numbers to the right indicate the result of games including result in bold of the team that won in that game, and the numbers furthest to the right indicate the number of games the team won in that round.

Eight-Finals
**E1**	**(Spain) FC Barcelona**	**78**	60	**86**	**2**
H4	(Turkey) Ülker	73	**63**	65	1
**F2**	**(Slovenia) Union Olimpija**	**65**	52	**85**	**2**
G3	(Greece) Olympiacos	61	**68**	67	1
**G1**	**(Israel) Maccabi Elite Tel Aviv**	**77**	55	**78**	**2**
F4	(Greece) PAOK	62	**67**	62	1
**H2**	**(Italy) Paf Wennington Bologna**	**82**	**77**	**2**
E3	(Italy) Benetton Treviso	73	61	0
**F1**	**(Greece) Panathinaikos**	**65**	64	**78**	**2**
G4	(Federal Republic of Yugoslavia) Budućnost	59	**77**	61	1
E2	(Russia) CSKA Moscow	72	**75**	69	1
**H3**	**(Croatia) Cibona VIP**	**75**	55	**78**	**2**
**H1**	**(Turkey) Efes Pilsen**	**90**	**93**	**2**
E4	(Germany) Alba Berlin	81	73	0
**G2**	**(France) ASVEL**	**72**	**85**	**2**
F3	(Spain) Real Madrid Teka	59	73	0

Quarter-Finals
**(Spain) FC Barcelona**	**70**	64	**71**	**2**
(Slovenia) Union Olimpija	67	**71**	66	1
**(Israel) Maccabi Elite Tel Aviv**	62	**80**	**79**	**2**
(Italy) Paf Wennington Bologna	**65**	73	64	1
**(Greece) Panathinaikos**	**73**	**69**	**2**
(Croatia) Cibona VIP	62	63	0
**(Turkey) Efes Pilsen**	**93**	60	**68**	**2**
(France) ASVEL	85	**77**	66	1

Semi-Finals
(Spain) FC Barcelona	51
**(Israel) Maccabi Elite Tel Aviv**	**65**
**(Greece) Panathinaikos**	**81**
(Turkey) Efes Pilsen	71

Final
(Israel) Maccabi Elite Tel Aviv	67
**(Greece) Panathinaikos**	**73**
Third Place
(Spain) FC Barcelona	69
**(Turkey) Efes Pilsen**	**75**

=== Eight-Finals ===
Team 1	Agg.	Team 2	1st leg	2nd leg	3rd leg
Union Olimpija (Slovenia)	2–1	(Greece) Olympiacos	65–61	52–68	85–67
FC Barcelona (Spain)	2–1	(Turkey) Ülker	78–73	60–63	86–65
Paf Wennington Bologna (Italy)	2–0	(Italy) Benetton Treviso	82–73	77–61	
Maccabi Elite Tel Aviv (Israel)	2–1	(Greece) PAOK	77–62	55–67	78–62
CSKA Moscow (Russia)	1–2	(Croatia) Cibona VIP	72–75	75–55	69–78
Panathinaikos (Greece)	2–1	(Federal Republic of Yugoslavia) Budućnost	65–59	64–77	78–61
ASVEL (France)	2–0	(Spain) Real Madrid Teka	72–59	85–73	
Efes Pilsen (Turkey)	2–0	(Germany) Alba Berlin	90–81	93–73	

=== Quarter-Finals ===
Team 1	Agg.	Team 2	1st leg	2nd leg	3rd leg
FC Barcelona (Spain)	2–1	(Slovenia) Union Olimpija	70–67	64–71	71–66
Maccabi Elite Tel Aviv (Israel)	2–1	(Italy) Paf Wennington Bologna	62–65	80–73	79–64
Panathinaikos (Greece)	2–0	(Croatia) Cibona VIP	73–62	69–63	
Efes Pilsen (Turkey)	2–1	(France) ASVEL	93–85	60–77	68–66

== Final Four ==
=== Semifinals ===
April 18, PAOK Sports Arena, Thessaloniki

Team 1	Score	Team 2
FC Barcelona (Spain)	51–65	(Israel) Maccabi Elite Tel Aviv
Panathinaikos (Greece)	81–71	(Turkey) Efes Pilsen

=== Third place game ===
April 20, PAOK Sports Arena, Thessaloniki

Team 1	Score	Team 2
FC Barcelona (Spain)	69–75	(Turkey) Efes Pilsen

=== Final ===
April 20, PAOK Sports Arena, Thessaloniki

Team 1	Score	Team 2
Maccabi Elite Tel Aviv (Israel)	67–73	(Greece) Panathinaikos

1999–2000 FIBA EuroLeague Champions

Panathinaikos
2nd Title

== Awards ==
All official awards of the 1999–2000 FIBA EuroLeague.

=== FIBA EuroLeague Final Four MVP ===
- (Federal Republic of Yugoslavia) Željko Rebrača ( (Greece) Panathinaikos)

=== FIBA EuroLeague All-Final Four Team ===
First Team
(Israel) Oded Kattash	(Greece) Panathinaikos
(Turkey) Hedo Türkoğlu	(Turkey) Efes Pilsen
(Federal Republic of Yugoslavia) Dejan Bodiroga	(Greece) Panathinaikos
(United States) Nate Huffman	(Israel) Maccabi Elite Tel Aviv
(Federal Republic of Yugoslavia) Željko Rebrača (MVP)	(Greece) Panathinaikos

=== FIBA EuroLeague Top Scorer ===
- (Slovenia) Miljan Goljović ( (Slovenia) Pivovarna Laško)

=== FIBA EuroLeague Finals Top Scorer ===
- (United States) Nate Huffman ( (Israel) Maccabi Elite Tel Aviv)

== Statistics ==
=== Individual statistics ===
==== Points ====
Rank	Name	Team	Games	Points	PPG
1.	(Slovenia) Miljan Goljović	(Slovenia) Pivovarna Laško	16	323	20.2
2.	(United States) David Rivers	(Turkey) Tofaş	16	316	19.8
3.	(United States) Wendell Alexis	(Germany) Alba Berlin	18	334	18.6

Source: FIBAEurope

==== Rebounds ====
Rank	Name	Team	Games	Rebounds	RPG
1.	(Turkey) Hüseyin Beşok	(Turkey) Efes Pilsen	23	231	10.0
2.	(United States) Nate Huffman	(Israel) Maccabi Elite Tel Aviv	24	225	9.4
3.	(United States) Rashard Griffith	(Turkey) Tofaş	16	146	9.1

Source: FIBAEurope

==== Assists ====
Rank	Name	Team	Games	Assists	APG
1.	(United States) David Rivers	(Turkey) Tofaş	16	79	4.9
2.	(Lithuania) Šarūnas Jasikevičius	(Slovenia) Union Olimpija	22	108	4.9
3.	(Croatia) Damir Mulaomerović	(Turkey) Efes Pilsen	23	108	4.7

Source: FIBAEurope

==== Blocks ====
Rank	Name	Team	Games	Blocks	BPG
1.	(Greece) Efthimios Rentzias	(Spain) FC Barcelona	12	8	0.7
2.	(Federal Republic of Yugoslavia) Željko Rebrača	(Greece) Panathinaikos	23	15	0.7
3.	(Russia) Andrei Kirilenko	(Russia) CSKA Moscow	19	10	0.5

Source: FIBAEurope

==== Other statistics ====
Category	Player	Team	Games	Average
Steals	(Italy) Andrea Meneghin	(Italy) Varese Roosters	16	2.9
Turnovers	(United States) Richard Scott	(Spain) Caja San Fernando	14	3.4
Minutes	(United States) David Rivers	(Turkey) Tofaş	16	38.7
FT %	(Italy) Carlton Myers	(Italy) Paf Wennington Bologna	17	91.9%
2-Point %	(Russia) Andrei Kirilenko	(Russia) CSKA Moscow	19	64.2%
3-Point %	(Russia) Valeriy Dayneko	(Russia) CSKA Moscow	17	55.7%

=== Individual game highs ===
Category	Player	Team	Statistic	Opponent
Points	(United States) David Rivers	(Turkey) Tofaş	38	(Russia) CSKA Moscow (Feb 3, 2000)
Rebounds	(Federal Republic of Yugoslavia) Dragan Tarlać	(Greece) Olympiacos	19	(Slovenia) Pivovarna Laško (Dec 8, 1999)
Assists	(Italy) Riccardo Pittis	(Italy) Benetton Treviso	12	(France) Cholet (Sep 23, 1999)
Blocks	(Greece) Efthimios Rentzias	(Spain) FC Barcelona	5	(Turkey) Ülker (Feb 29, 2000)
Blocks	(Federal Republic of Yugoslavia) Željko Rebrača	(Greece) Panathinaikos	5	(Croatia) Cibona VIP (Mar 21, 2000)
Steals	(Russia) Andrei Kirilenko	(Russia) CSKA Moscow	8	(France) Cholet (Oct 21, 1999)
Steals	(Spain) Alberto Angulo	(Spain) Real Madrid Teka	8	(Germany) Alba Berlin (Nov 18, 1999)

=== Team statistics ===
Category	Team	Average
Points	(Turkey) Efes Pilsen	77.0
Rebounds	(Spain) FC Barcelona	32.5
Assists	(Lithuania) Žalgiris	16.6
Blocks	(Greece) Panathinaikos	1.2
Steals	(Italy) Varese Roosters	11.8
Turnovers	(Lithuania) Žalgiris	15.2
FT %	(Italy) Paf Wennington Bologna	80.5%
2-Point %	(Federal Republic of Yugoslavia) Budućnost	59.5%
3-Point %	(Greece) Panathinaikos	41.4%

== See also ==
- 1999–2000 FIBA Saporta Cup
- 1999–2000 FIBA Korać Cup

== Sources ==
- 1999-00 scoresheets
