= Shimon Mizrahi =

Israeli lawyer

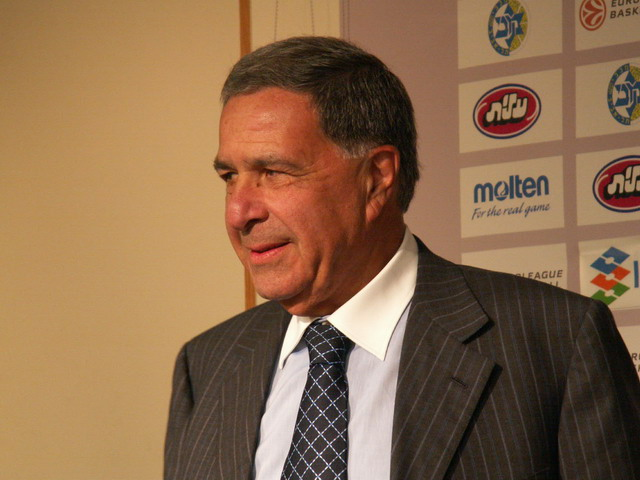
- Mizrahi, in 2006.

Maccabi Tel Aviv
- Position: Chairman
- League: Israeli Premier League; EuroLeague

Personal information
- Born: 16 October 1939 (age 87) Tel Aviv, Israel

Career highlights
- As Executive: EuroLeague Legend (2018); European Super Cup champion (1991); 5× EuroLeague champion (1977, 1981, 2004, 2005, 2014); FIBA SuproLeague champion (2001); Adriatic League champion (2012); 46× Israeli Super League champion (1970–1992, 1994–2007, 2009, 2011, 2012, 2014, 2018–2021, 2023–2024); 36× Israeli State Cup winner (1970–1973, 1975, 1977–1983, 1985–1987, 1989–1991, 1994, 1998–2006, 2010–17); 7× Israeli League Cup winner (2007, 2010–13, 2015, 2017)

Shimon Mizrahi (Hebrew: שמעון מזרחי; born October 16, 1939, Tel Aviv) is an Israeli lawyer and the chairman of the Maccabi Tel Aviv Basketball Club.

== Biography ==
Shimon Mizrahi was born in Tel Aviv. He is the son of a bank manager who was also a football player and a tennis player for Maccabi Tel Aviv, and a mother who was also a tennis player. In 1957, Mizrahi enlisted in the Israel Defense Forces and served as an investigator in the Military Police Criminal Investigation Division. In the final year of his service, he began studying law, and after his discharge, he completed his studies at the Faculty of Law of the Hebrew University of Jerusalem.

=== Professional career ===
Mizrahi is the senior partner in the B. Arnon – S. Mizrahi law office, and specializes in traffic violation cases. In 2006, he defended the prominent attorney Dori Klagsbald, in a high-profile case of manslaughter, following the death of two, a mother and child, that were killed by Klagsbald's vehicle.

=== Maccabi Tel Aviv ===
Mizrahi was appointed the chairman of the Maccabi Tel Aviv basketball club in 1969. In the wake of the club's financial problems, he introduced various strategies to rescue Maccabi from bankruptcy, such as selling tickets for Maccabi games, which had previously been free. Mizrahi realized that in order to secure Maccabi's dominance in the Israeli Super League, it would have to sign American players.

Since he became the club's chairman in 1969, Maccabi has won 44 Israeli Super League championships, winning the league's title in all but eight seasons (1992–93, 2007–08, 2009–10, 2012–13, 2014–15, 2015–16, and 2016–17, 2021–22). The club has also won 36 Israeli State Cup and 7 Israeli League Cup titles during his tenure. The club also won the Adriatic League championship (2012), with Mizrahi running the club. However, Maccabi's main achievement during his time as the club's chairman, includes the winning of 6 top-tier level European-wide titles, as they won the EuroLeague championship 5 times (1977, 1981, 2004, 2005, and 2014), and also the FIBA SuproLeague championship (2001).

Mizrahi was at one time accused by rival clubs of failing to make the Israeli Super League more competitive, by having plans to implement payment limits to players. However, Mizrahi agreed to several new league rules which were meant to weaken Maccabi, such as the Brisker Rule, which limits the number of foreign players every team can sign, and the implementation of a Final Four format, instead of a best-of-five playoff series system, among other rule changes.

On 21 December 2021, Mizrahi was announced as a candidate for the Class of 2022 at the Basketball Hall of Fame.

== Awards and accolades ==
- In 2007, Mizrahi was chosen by Time magazine, as one of 50 best sport managers in the world.
- In 2011, he was awarded the Israel Prize for sports, for his long-time contribution to Maccabi Tel Aviv. Although this award was contested, it was upheld by the Supreme Court of Israel.
- In November 2018, Mizrahi was honored and announced as a EuroLeague Basketball Legend. He was the first EuroLeague Basketball Legend selected from the club executive level.

== See also ==
- List of Israel Prize recipients
