= Ariel McDonald =

American-Slovenian professional basketball player

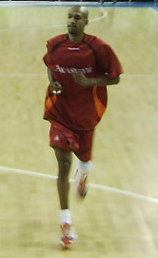
- McDonald, in 2007

Personal information
- Born: January 5, 1972 (age 54) Harvey, Illinois, U.S.
- Listed height: 6 ft 3 in (1.91 m)
- Listed weight: 190 lb (86 kg)

Career information
- High school: Homewood-Flossmoor (Flossmoor, Illinois); Athens Drive (Raleigh, North Carolina)
- College: Minnesota (1990–1994)
- NBA draft: 1994: undrafted
- Playing career: 1994–2009
- Position: Point guard

Career history
- 1994–1995: Castors Braine
- 1995–1996: Interier Krško
- 1996–1999: Olimpija Ljubljana
- 1999–2002: Maccabi Tel Aviv
- 2002–2004: Panathinaikos
- 2004–2005: Dynamo Moscow
- 2005–2008: Akasvayu Girona
- 2008: Dynamo Moscow
- 2008–2009: Montepaschi Siena

Career highlights
- As player: FIBA SuproLeague champion (2001); FIBA SuproLeague Final Four MVP (2001); All-EuroLeague Second Team (2002); FIBA EuroChallenge champion (2007); FIBA EuroChallenge Final Four MVP (2007); FIBA EuroChallenge All-Star Day (2007); Italian League champion (2009); 2× Greek League champion (2003, 2004); Greek Cup winner (2003); 3× Israeli League champion (2000–2002); 3× Israeli Cup winner (2000–2002); Israeli Basketball Premier League MVP (2000); 3× Slovenian League champion (1997–1999); 3× Slovenian Cup winner (1997–1999); NIT champion (1993)

Ariel Rene McDonald (born January 5, 1972) is an American-Slovenian former professional basketball player. He played at the point guard position. A high quality floor general who was the 2000 Israeli Basketball Premier League MVP, FIBA SuproLeague Final Four MVP in 2001, and an All-EuroLeague Second Team member in 2002, McDonald played for top European teams like Montepaschi Siena, Olimpija Ljubljana, Maccabi Tel Aviv, Panathinaikos, Akasvayu Girona, and Dynamo Moscow.

== Early life and career ==
McDonald began his high school career at Homewood-Flossmoor High School, outside of Chicago. He averaged 24 points per game, on 63% field-goal shooting, and 10 assists per game. After two years at Homewood-Flossmoor, McDonald's family moved to Raleigh, North Carolina. McDonald took his new high school, Athens Drive High School, to the final four in North Carolina.

== College career ==
In the fall of 1989, McDonald arrived at the University of Minnesota. In his first year of college basketball, McDonald was red-shirted. He and the Golden Gophers greatly improved over the next four years, winning the NIT Tournament, and reaching the second round of the 1994 NCAA Tournament, in McDonald's senior year.

== Professional career ==
McDonald began his pro career in Europe, playing with small teams like Castors Braine (Belgium) and Interier Krško (Slovenia). After his time in Interier Krsko, he was signed by the top Slovenian basketball club: Olimpija Ljubljana. During his time in Slovenia, he played in the EuroLeague, which is the top-tier level of European-wide professional club basketball, and he played in the 1997 EuroLeague Final Four.

McDonald's next stop was Maccabi Tel Aviv. Soon McDonald became very famous in Israel, and together with Nate Huffman and Anthony Parker, turned Maccabi into one of the best European basketball teams. In McDonald's three seasons with Maccabi, the club won the FIBA SuproLeague title (2001) and twice reached the EuroLeague Final Four (2000, 2002). He was the 2000 Israeli Basketball Premier League MVP

McDonald played in 139 games, scoring 1,606 points for Maccabi Tel Aviv in three years. Finally, he said goodbye to the club, and moved to one of Maccabi's biggest rivals: Panathinaikos. With Panathinaikos, McDonald put up solid numbers, and also 19 points in the first game he played against his former team, Maccabi Tel Aviv. McDonald played for Akasvayu Girona in the Spanish ACB League, from the 2005–06 season, up until July 2008. Then he returned to Dynamo Moscow, for which he had previously played with, in the 2004–05 season.

== National team career ==
McDonald was also a member of the senior men's Slovenian national basketball team. He played with Slovenia's senior national team at the FIBA EuroBasket 2001.

== Coaching career ==
After he retired from playing professional basketball, McDonald became a high school basketball coach at Providence Academy, in Plymouth, Minnesota.

== Personal life ==
After playing for two years in Slovenia, McDonald became a Slovenian citizen in June 1997. One of McDonald's claims to fame in Israel, was a Burger King commercial, in which he said: "Listen to McDonald - only Burger King".
