= Miljan Goljović =

Slovenian basketball player

Personal information
- Born: August 27, 1971 (age 55) Raška, SR Serbia, SFR Yugoslavia
- Listed height: 6 ft 8 in (2.03 m)
- Listed weight: 225 lb (102 kg)

Career information
- NBA draft: 1993: undrafted
- Playing career: 1990–2010
- Position: Small forward
- Number: 8

Career history
- 1990–1992: Sloga Kraljevo
- 1992–1993: Partizan
- 1993–1994: Radnički Belgrade
- 1994–1996: Bavaria-Woltex Maribor
- 1996–1997: Maribor Ovni
- 1997–2000: Pivovarna Laško
- 2000–2003: Ülkerspor
- 2003: Coop Nordest Trieste
- 2003–2004: Lietuvos rytas
- 2004–2005: MENT
- 2005–2007: EnBW Ludwigsburg
- 2007–2009: Raiffeisen Panthers Fürstenfeld
- 2009–2010: Zlatorog Laško

Career highlights
- FIBA EuroLeague Top Scorer (2000); Turkish League champion (2001); 2× Turkish Supercup winner (2001, 2002); Turkish Cup winner (2003); Lithuanian League All-Star (2004); 4× Slovenian League All-Star (1995–2000); 2× Slovenian All-Star Game 3-point Contest Winner (1997, 1999); Austrian League champion (2008); Austrian Cup winner (2009)

Miljan Goljović (born August 27, 1971) is a retired Slovenian professional basketball player. He was a 2.03 m tall small forward, that was a remarkable talent on offense.

== Club career ==
Goljović was the Top Scorer of the EuroLeague 1999–00 season, as a player of Pivovarna Laško, averaging 20.2 points per game. He also played in the EuroLeague wearing the jersey of Ulkerspor.

== Slovenian national team ==
Goljović was also a member of the senior Slovenian national basketball team.

== Personal life ==
Goljović was born in Raška, Serbia. He acquired Slovenian citizenship following his move there, in 1994.
