= Miroslav Berić =

Serbian basketball player (born 1973)

Personal information
- Born: January 20, 1973 (age 53) Belgrade, SR Serbia, SFR Yugoslavia
- Listed height: 2.00 m (6 ft 7 in)
- Listed weight: 95 kg (209 lb)

Career information
- NBA draft: 1995: undrafted
- Playing career: 1990–2007
- Position: Shooting guard

Career history
- 1990–1997: Partizan
- 1991–1992: →Profikolor
- 1997–1999: Tau Cerámica
- 1999–2000: Müller Verona
- 2000–2001: Partizan
- 2001–2003: Scavolini Pesaro
- 2003–2004: Žalgiris
- 2004–2005: Panellinios
- 2005–2006: Azovmash
- 2006: Llanera Menorca
- 2007: Gijón

Career highlights
- FIBA SuproLeague Top Scorer (2001); Spanish Cup winner (1999); 3× YUBA League champion (1995–1997); YUBA League Top Scorer (2001); 2× FR Yugoslavia Cup winner (1994, 1995); Lithuanian League champion (2004); 1× YUBA All-Star (1997)
Medals
Representing (Federal Republic of Yugoslavia) FR Yugoslavia
Men's basketball
Olympic Games
Silver medal – second place	1996 Atlanta
FIBA World Cup
Gold medal – first place	1998 Greece
EuroBasket
Gold medal – first place	1995 Greece
Gold medal – first place	1997 Spain

Miroslav "Mića" Berić (Serbian Cyrillic: Мирослав "Мића" Берић; born January 20, 1973) is a Serbian former professional basketball player. Standing at 2.00 m (6'6 3/4") tall, he played at the shooting guard position.

== Professional career ==
Berić was the top scorer of the 2000–01 FIBA SuproLeague, averaging 23.3 points per game, while playing with Partizan. He also played for Tau Vitoria, Müller Verona, Scavolini Pesaro, Žalgiris, Panellinios, Azovmash, Llanera Menorca and Gijón.

After being without a club for more than a year, Berić announced his retirement from basketball in June 2008.

== Yugoslav national team ==
Berić was a regular member of the senior Yugoslav national team, during the 1990s. He won two FIBA EuroBasket gold medals, in 1995 and 1997, as well as the gold medal at the 1998 FIBA World Championship.

== Career statistics ==
Legend
GP	Games played	GS	Games started	MPG	Minutes per game
FG%	Field-goal percentage	3P%	3-point field-goal percentage	FT%	Free-throw percentage
RPG	Rebounds per game	APG	Assists per game	SPG	Steals per game
BPG	Blocks per game	PPG	Points per game	PIR	Performance index rating
**Bold**	Career high

=== EuroLeague ===
Year	Team	GP	GS	MPG	FG%	3P%	FT%	RPG	APG	SPG	BPG	PPG	PIR
2001–02	Pesaro	**16**	**11**	**28.6**	.397	.387	**.807**	**1.6**	**1.9**	**.6**	.0	**13.0**	**10.6**
2003–04	Žalgiris	9	5	23.6	**.500**	**.419**	.625	1.3	1.7	.3	.0	9.8	6.6
Career		25	16	26.8	.428	.396	.766	1.5	1.8	.5	.0	11.8	9.2

== Post-playing career ==
Soon after his retirement, in July 2008, Berić was hired as the team manager of the senior Serbian national team. The hiring took place at the invitation of the team's head coach Dušan Ivković.

He quit the job in 2011.

=== Political engagement ===
Berić participated in the 2023 Belgrade City Assembly election as a candidate of the Serbia Against Violence opposition coalition and was elected to the City Assembly.

== See also ==
- List of Olympic medalists in basketball
