= 2000–01 FIBA SuproLeague =

Sports season

- Season: 2000–01
- Duration: 18 October 2000 – 13 May 2001
- Teams: 20

Finals
- Champions: (Israel) Maccabi Tel Aviv (3rd title)
- Runners-up: (Greece) Panathinaikos
- Third place: (Turkey) Efes Pilsen
- Fourth place: (Russia) CSKA Moscow

Awards
- Player of the Year: (United States) Nate Huffman
- Final Four MVP: (Slovenia) Ariel McDonald

Statistical leaders
Points	(Federal Republic of Yugoslavia) Miroslav Berić	23.3
Rebounds	(Italy) Roberto Chiacig	9.4
Assists	(Latvia) Raimonds Miglinieks	7.0

The 2000–01 FIBA SuproLeague was FIBA Europe's professional club basketball tournament for the 2000–01 season. Up until that season, there was one cup, the FIBA European Champions' Cup (which is now called the EuroLeague), though in this season of 2000–01, the leading European teams split into two competitions: the FIBA SuproLeague and Euroleague Basketball Company's Euroleague 2000–01.

The season started on 18 October 2000, and ended on 13 May 2001. The competition's Final Four took place at Palais Omnisports de Paris-Bercy, in Paris, France. The 2000–01 SuproLeague was the last European top tier club competition organised by FIBA.

== European Champions' Cup teams divided ==
The European Champions' Cup was originally established by FIBA and it operated under its umbrella from 1958 until the summer of 2000, concluding with the 1999–2000 season. Euroleague Basketball was created on 1 July 2000.

FIBA had never trademarked the "EuroLeague" name and had no legal recourse on the usage of that name. Therefore, FIBA had to find a new name for their league and chose "SuproLeague". The 2000–01 season started with two top European professional club basketball competitions: the FIBA SuproLeague (renamed from the FIBA EuroLeague) and the brand new Euroleague.

Top clubs were split between the two leagues: Panathinaikos, Maccabi Tel Aviv, CSKA Moscow, and Efes Pilsen stayed with FIBA, while Olympiacos, Kinder Bologna, Real Madrid, FC Barcelona, Tau Cerámica, and Benetton Treviso joined Euroleague Basketball.

== Competition system and format ==
- 20 teams (national domestic league champions, and runners-up from various national domestic leagues), playing in a tournament system.

The first phase was a regular season, in which the twenty competing teams were drawn into two groups, each containing ten teams. Each team played every other team in its group at home and away, resulting in 18 games for each team. The top 8 teams in each group advanced to the Round of 16, and the winners of this round advanced to the Quarterfinals. Both of the rounds were played in a Best-of-three playoff system. The winning teams of the Quarterfinals qualified to the SuproLeague Final Four, which was held in the Palais Omnisports de Paris-Bercy, in Paris, on 10–13 May 2001.

== Teams ==
Regular season
(France) ASVEL (2nd)	(Greece) Iraklis (7th)	(Turkey) Efes Pilsen (2nd)	(Poland) Śląsk Wrocław (1st)
(France) Pau-Orthez (3rd)	(Israel) Maccabi Elite Tel Aviv (1st)	(Turkey) Ülker (3rd)	(Russia) CSKA Moscow (1st)
(Germany) Alba Berlin (1st)	(Israel) Maccabi Ness Ra'anana (2nd)	(Belgium) Telindus Oostende (2nd)	(Slovenia) Krka (1st)
(Germany) Bayer 04 Leverkusen (2nd)	(Italy) Montepaschi Siena (6th)	Croatia Osiguranje Split (3rd)	(Sweden) Plannja Basket (1st)
(Greece) Panathinaikos (1st)	(Italy) Scavolini Pesaro (9th)	(Lithuania) Lietuvos rytas (1st)	(Federal Republic of Yugoslavia) Partizan ICN (2nd)

== Qualification round ==
If one or more clubs were level on won-lost record, tiebreakers were applied in the following order:

1. Head-to-head record in matches between the tied clubs
2. Overall point difference in games between the tied clubs
3. Overall point difference in all group matches (first tiebreaker if tied clubs were not in the same group)
4. Points scored in all group matches
5. Sum of quotients of points scored and points allowed in each group match

=== Group A ===
==== Standings ====
Pos	Team	Pld	W	L	PF	PA	PD	Pts	Qualification
1	(Greece) Panathinaikos	18	13	5	1477	1364	+113	31	Advance to Play Offs
2	(Russia) CSKA Moscow	18	12	6	1429	1376	+53	30	Advance to Play Offs
3	(Croatia) Split CO	18	12	6	1363	1335	+28	30	Advance to Play Offs
4	(Turkey) Ülker	18	11	7	1481	1419	+62	29	Advance to Play Offs
5	(Germany) Alba Berlin	18	9	9	1439	1408	+31	27	Advance to Play Offs
6	(France) ASVEL	18	9	9	1413	1400	+13	27	Advance to Play Offs
7	(Lithuania) Lietuvos rytas	18	7	11	1522	1536	−14	25	Advance to Play Offs
8	(Poland) Śląsk Wrocław	18	7	11	1432	1446	−14	25	Advance to Play Offs
9	(Italy) Montepaschi Siena	18	6	12	1406	1495	−89	24	
10	(Israel) Maccabi Ra'anana	18	4	14	1294	1477	−183	22	

Source: FIBA Europe

==== Results ====
Home \ Away	ALB	ASV	CSK	RYT	RAA	MPS	PAO	WRO	SPL	ULK
Alba Berlin	—	74–68	80–77	95–70	77–68	79–80	79–71	86–78	73–79	75–78
ASVEL	74–71	—	72–80	87–69	93–71	86–87	86–92	74–70	88–78	71–66
CSKA Moscow	89–86	83–91	—	88–82	69–68	85–78	69–57	72–65	66–57	83–88
Lietuvos rytas	71–80	80–81	84–88	—	91–69	92–93	87–78	91–101	93–77	79–97
Maccabi Ra'anana	77–84	75–68	66–74	71–88	—	86–71	68–82	89–82	77–84	77–76
Montepaschi Siena	93–83	67–70	76–78	87–91	82–67	—	65–97	74–83	76–81	76–87
Panathinaikos	92–75	86–82	89–81	104–83	83–61	99–95	—	85–79	64–60	84–77
Śląsk Wrocław	76–85	89–79	69–84	74–92	95–68	82–72	62–76	—	72–75	79–69
Split CO	77–73	84–78	75–72	83–80	76–65	81–61	68–59	83–88	—	76–70
Ülker	90–84	78–65	93–91	83–99	102–71	68–73	87–79	92–88	80–69	—

Source: FIBA Europe
Legend: Blue = home team win; Red = away team win.
Matches with lighter background shading were decided after overtime.

=== Group B ===
==== Standings ====
Pos	Team	Pld	W	L	PF	PA	PD	Pts	Qualification
1	(Israel) Maccabi Tel Aviv	18	15	3	1616	1343	+273	33	Advance to Play Offs
2	(Turkey) Efes Pilsen	18	13	5	1478	1386	+92	31	Advance to Play Offs
3	(Federal Republic of Yugoslavia) Partizan ICN	18	11	7	1492	1517	−25	29	Advance to Play Offs
4	(Greece) Iraklis	18	10	8	1494	1504	−10	28	Advance to Play Offs
5	(Italy) Scavolini Pesaro	18	9	9	1594	1518	+76	27	Advance to Play Offs
6	(France) Pau-Orthez	18	9	9	1486	1432	+54	27	Advance to Play Offs
7	(Belgium) Telindus Oostende	18	8	10	1478	1544	−66	26	Advance to Play Offs
8	(Slovenia) Krka	18	7	11	1401	1487	−86	25	Advance to Play Offs
9	(Germany) Bayer 04 Leverkusen	18	6	12	1559	1624	−65	24	
10	(Sweden) Plannja	18	2	16	1394	1637	−243	20	

Source: FIBA Europe

==== Results ====
Home \ Away	LEV	EFS	IRA	KRK	MTA	PAR	PAU	PLA	SCA	OOS
Bayer 04 Leverkusen	—	69–71	106–110	102–94	98–100	95–81	88–79	89–72	78–82	82–90
Efes Pilsen	97–88	—	88–65	84–70	72–66	93–82	88–76	104–75	96–92	89–80
Iraklis	98–87	72–87	—	73–80	92–85	91–76	86–82	89–74	92–85	74–62
Krka	92–73	64–72	65–85	—	89–87	78–79	73–77	97–92	102–100	80–78
Maccabi Tel Aviv	100–67	69–59	95–71	83–67	—	89–53	91–67	95–69	80–78	96–79
Partizan	108–99	79–68	93–81	77–67	73–95	—	75–69	99–88	76–73	89–80
Pau-Orthez	79–80	94–73	76–74	100–75	80–93	92–81	—	86–59	84–76	92–95
Plannja	76–84	84–92	90–94	72–68	68–113	81–90	62–75	—	78–85	88–87
Scavolini Pesaro	107–89	82–80	90–70	90–68	81–85	84–93	102–89	91–78	—	118–97
Telindus Oostende	88–85	79–65	83–77	63–72	80–94	94–88	61–89	99–88	83–78	—

Source: FIBA Europe
Legend: Blue = home team win; Red = away team win.
Matches with lighter background shading were decided after overtime.

== Playoffs ==
=== Bracket ===
Teams in bold advanced to the next round. The numbers to the left of each team indicate the team's seeding, the numbers to the right indicate the result of games including result in bold of the team that won in that game, and the numbers furthest to the right indicate the number of games the team won in that round.

Eight-Finals
**A1**	**(Greece) Panathinaikos**	**82**	**86**	**2**
B8	(Slovenia) Krka	65	79	0
B4	(Greece) Iraklis	**78**	77	75	1
**A5**	**(Germany) Alba Berlin**	67	**88**	**86**	**2**
**B2**	**(Turkey) Efes Pilsen**	**89**	69	**86**	**2**
A7	(Lithuania) Lietuvos rytas	78	**73**	67	1
**A3**	**(Croatia) Split CO**	**79**	**85**	**2**
B6	(France) Pau-Orthez	78	83	0
**B1**	**(Israel) Maccabi Tel Aviv**	**81**	**85**	**2**
A8	(Poland) Śląsk Wrocław	75	62	0
A4	(Turkey) Ülker	**91**	83	85	1
**B5**	**(Italy) Scavolini Pesaro**	81	**96**	**88**	**2**
**A2**	**(Russia) CSKA Moscow**	**94**	**77**	**2**
B7	(Belgium) Telindus Oostende	76	70	0
B3	(Federal Republic of Yugoslavia) Partizan ICN	**80**	76	62	1
**A6**	**(France) ASVEL**	73	**94**	**73**	**2**

Quarter-Finals
**(Greece) Panathinaikos**	**87**	**71**	**2**
(Germany) Alba Berlin	77	69	0
**(Turkey) Efes Pilsen**	**95**	64	**82**	**2**
(Croatia) Split CO	69	**72**	59	1
**(Israel) Maccabi Tel Aviv**	**80**	**84**	**2**
(Italy) Scavolini Pesaro	69	77	0
**(Russia) CSKA Moscow**	**78**	**82**	**2**
(France) ASVEL	63	76	0

Semi-Finals
**(Greece) Panathinaikos**	**74**
(Turkey) Efes Pilsen	66
**(Israel) Maccabi Tel Aviv**	**86**
(Russia) CSKA Moscow	80

Final
(Greece) Panathinaikos	67
**(Israel) Maccabi Tel Aviv**	**81**
Third Place
**(Turkey) Efes Pilsen**	**91**
(Russia) CSKA Moscow	85

=== Eight-Finals ===
Team 1	Agg.	Team 2	1st leg	2nd leg	3rd leg
Panathinaikos (Greece)	2–0	(Slovenia) Krka	82–65	86–79	
CSKA Moscow (Russia)	2–0	(Belgium) Telindus Oostende	94–76	77–70	
Efes Pilsen (Turkey)	2–1	(Lithuania) Lietuvos rytas	89–78	69–73	86–67
Maccabi Tel Aviv (Israel)	2–0	(Poland) Śląsk Wrocław	81–75	85–62	
Ülker (Turkey)	1–2	(Italy) Scavolini Pesaro	91–81	83–96	85–88
Split CO (Croatia)	2–0	(France) Pau-Orthez	79–78	85–83	
Partizan (Federal Republic of Yugoslavia)	1–2	(France) ASVEL	80–73	76–94	62–73
Iraklis (Greece)	1–2	(Germany) Alba Berlin	78–67	77–88	75–86

=== Quarter-Finals ===
Team 1	Agg.	Team 2	1st leg	2nd leg	3rd leg
Panathinaikos (Greece)	2–0	(Germany) Alba Berlin	87–77	71–69	
CSKA Moscow (Russia)	2–0	(France) ASVEL	78–63	82–76	
Efes Pilsen (Turkey)	2–1	(Croatia) Split CO	95–69	64–72	82–59
Maccabi Tel Aviv (Israel)	2–0	(Italy) Scavolini Pesaro	80–69	84–77	

== Final four ==
=== Semifinals ===
11 May, Palais Omnisports de Paris-Bercy, Paris

Team 1	Score	Team 2
Panathinaikos (Greece)	74–66	(Turkey) Efes Pilsen
Maccabi Tel Aviv (Israel)	86–80	(Russia) CSKA Moscow

=== 3rd place game ===
13 May, Palais Omnisports de Paris-Bercy, Paris

Team 1	Score	Team 2
Efes Pilsen (Turkey)	91–85	(Russia) CSKA Moscow

=== Final ===
13 May, Palais Omnisports de Paris-Bercy, Paris

Team 1	Score	Team 2
Panathinaikos (Greece)	67–81	(Israel) Maccabi Tel Aviv

2000–01 FIBA SuproLeague champions

Maccabi Tel Aviv
3rd title

=== Final standings ===
Pos	Team
Gold medal	(Israel) Maccabi Tel Aviv
Silver medal	(Greece) Panathinaikos
Bronze medal	(Turkey) Efes Pilsen
4	(Russia) CSKA Moscow

== Awards ==
All official awards of the 2000–01 FIBA SuproLeague:

- FIBA SuproLeague Player of the Year — (United States) Nate Huffman ( (Israel) Maccabi Tel Aviv)
- FIBA SuproLeague Final Four MVP – (Slovenia) Ariel McDonald ( (Israel) Maccabi Tel Aviv)
- FIBA SuproLeague Top Scorer – (Federal Republic of Yugoslavia) Miroslav Berić ( (Federal Republic of Yugoslavia) Partizan)
- FIBA SuproLeague Finals Top Scorer – (Federal Republic of Yugoslavia) Dejan Bodiroga ( (Greece) Panathinaikos)

=== FIBA SuproLeague All-Final Four Team ===
FIBA SuproLeague All-Final Four Team
(Slovenia) Ariel McDonald (MVP)	(Israel) Maccabi Tel Aviv
(United States) Anthony Parker	(Israel) Maccabi Tel Aviv
(Federal Republic of Yugoslavia) Dejan Bodiroga	(Greece) Panathinaikos
(Russia) Andrei Kirilenko	(Russia) CSKA Moscow
(United States) Nate Huffman	(Israel) Maccabi Tel Aviv

== Statistics ==
=== Individual statistics ===
==== Points ====
Rank	Name	Team	Games	Points	PPG
1.	(Federal Republic of Yugoslavia) Miroslav Berić	(Federal Republic of Yugoslavia) Partizan	20	465	23.3
2.	(United States) Charles Thomas	(Sweden) Plannja	13	291	22.4
3.	(United States) John Best	(Germany) Bayer 04 Leverkusen	17	378	22.2

Source: FIBA Europe

==== Rebounds ====
Rank	Name	Team	Games	Rebounds	RPG
1.	(Italy) Roberto Chiacig	(Italy) Montepaschi Siena	18	169	9.4
2.	(Russia) Andrei Kirilenko	(Russia) CSKA Moscow	22	203	9.2
3.	(United States) Nate Huffman	(Israel) Maccabi Tel Aviv	24	216	9.0

Source: FIBA Europe

==== Assists ====
Rank	Name	Team	Games	Assists	APG
1.	(Latvia) Raimonds Miglinieks	(Poland) Śląsk Wrocław	20	139	7.0
2.	(France) Laurent Sciarra	(France) ASVEL	23	142	6.2
3.	(United States) Chuck Evans	(Germany) Bayer 04 Leverkusen	18	97	5.4

Source: FIBA Europe

==== Blocks ====
Rank	Name	Team	Games	Blocks	BPG
1.	(Russia) Andrei Kirilenko	(Russia) CSKA Moscow	22	47	2.1
2.	(Russia) Andrei Fetisov	(Russia) CSKA Moscow	24	38	1.6
3.	(Federal Republic of Yugoslavia) Dejan Koturović	(Germany) Alba Berlin	23	35	1.5

Source: FIBA Europe

==== Other statistics ====
Category	Player	Team	Games	Average
Steals	(United States) Ralph Biggs	(Belgium) Telindus Oostende	20	2.1
Turnovers	(Lithuania) Andrius Giedraitis	(Lithuania) Lietuvos rytas	15	3.7
Minutes	(United States) Charles Thomas	(Sweden) Plannja	13	38.5
FT %	(Croatia) Damir Mulaomerović	(Turkey) Efes Pilsen	26	89.2%
2-Point %	(Russia) Andrei Kirilenko	(Russia) CSKA Moscow	22	63.9%
3-Point %	(France) Laurent Pluvy	(France) ASVEL	23	54.2%

=== Individual game highs ===
Category	Player	Team	Statistic	Opponent
Points	(Federal Republic of Yugoslavia) Miroslav Berić	(Federal Republic of Yugoslavia) Partizan	38	(Belgium) Telindus Oostende (Dec 7, 2000)
Rebounds	(Greece) Lazaros Papadopoulos	(Greece) Iraklis Thessaloniki	21	(Germany) Alba Berlin (Apr 5, 2001)
Rebounds	(Turkey) Hüseyin Beşok	(Turkey) Efes Pilsen	21	(Sweden) Plannja (Jan 4, 2001)
Assists	(Latvia) Raimonds Miglinieks	(Poland) Śląsk Wrocław	15	(Italy) Montepaschi Siena (Nov 15, 2000)
Blocks	(Turkey) Hüseyin Beşok	(Turkey) Efes Pilsen	7	(Sweden) Plannja (Jan 4, 2001)
Steals	(Federal Republic of Yugoslavia) Veselin Petrović	(Federal Republic of Yugoslavia) Partizan	9	(Sweden) Plannja (Feb 15, 2001)

=== Team statistics ===
Category	Team	Average
Points	(Israel) Maccabi Tel Aviv	88.0
Rebounds	(Greece) Iraklis Thessaloniki	33.8
Assists	(France) ASVEL	18.0
Blocks	(Russia) CSKA Moscow	4.3
Steals	(Italy) Montepaschi Siena	10.1
Turnovers	(Sweden) Plannja	14.8
FT %	(Italy) Scavolini Pesaro	79.4%
2-Point %	(Greece) Panathinaikos	56.4%
3-Point %	(Italy) Scavolini Pesaro	40.4%

== Two continental champions ==
In May 2001, Europe had two continental champions, Maccabi Tel Aviv of the FIBA SuproLeague and Kinder Bologna of Euroleague Basketball Company's EuroLeague. The leaders of both organizations realized the need to come up with a new single competition. Negotiating from the position of strength, Euroleague Basketball Company dictated proceedings and FIBA essentially had no choice but to agree to their terms. As a result, the EuroLeague was fully integrated under Euroleague Basketball Company's umbrella, and teams that competed in the FIBA SuproLeague during the 2000–01 season joined it as well. It is today officially admitted that European basketball had two champions that year, Maccabi of the FIBA SuproLeague and Kinder Bologna of the Euroleague Basketball Company's EuroLeague.

== Formation of the Euroleague ==
A year later, Euroleague Basketball Company and FIBA decided that Euroleague Basketball's EuroLeague competition would be the main basketball tournament on the continent, to be played between the top-level teams of Europe. FIBA Europe from 2002 would also organize a European league for third-tier level teams, known as the FIBA Europe League competition, while Euroleague Basketball would also organize its own second-tier level league, combining FIBA's long-time FIBA Saporta Cup and FIBA Korać Cup competitions into one new competition, the EuroCup. In 2005, Euroleague Basketball and FIBA decided to cooperate with each other and did so until 2016.

In essence, the authority in European professional basketball was divided over club-country lines. FIBA stayed in charge of national team competitions (like the FIBA EuroBasket, the FIBA World Cup, and the Summer Olympics), while Euroleague Basketball took over the European professional club competitions. From that point on, FIBA Saporta Cup and FIBA Korać Cup competitions lasted only one more season before folding, which was when Euroleague Basketball launched the EuroCup.

== See also ==
- 2000–01 Euroleague
- 2000–01 FIBA Saporta Cup
- 2000–01 FIBA Korać Cup
