= P.A.O.K. Sports Arena =

Indoor arena in Greece

PAOK Sports Arena
- Το Παλατάκι
- Internal view
- Interactive map of PAOK Sports Arena
- Location: Pylaia, Thessaloniki, Greece
- Coordinates: 40°33′56.18″N 22°58′52.51″E
- Owner: AC PAOK
- Operator: PAOK BC
- Capacity: Basketball & Volleyball: 8,142 (permanent seats), 8,500 (total seats); Concerts: 10,000
- Surface: Parquet
- Public transit: 02Κ, 03Κ,01Ν: Kleisto Gipedo Basket Pyleas

Construction
- Groundbreaking: March 18, 1990
- Opened: 2000
- Renovated: 2016, 2025–2026

Tenants
- PAOK BC (2000–present); PAOK VC (2002–present); PAOK Women's BC (2007–present); PAOK Women's VC (2022–2024)

P.A.O.K. Sports Arena (Greek: Κλειστό γήπεδο ΠΑΟΚ) is an indoor arena located in Pylaia, Thessaloniki, Greece, and it hosts the men's basketball, women's basketball, men's volleyball and women's volleyball departments of the multi-sports club PAOK.

PAOK Sports Arena is the largest privately owned arena in Greece. It was opened in 2000, and in the same year, it hosted the EuroLeague and Greek Cup final-fours. It is built on land donated by Ioannis Dedeoglou, for which P.A.O.K. B.C. holds an annual tournament in his honor. It has 8,142 seats for fans and 502 parking spots.

PAOK's volleyball department had to wait until 2002, to begin using the stadium. The arena also includes a training facility, club offices, shops, and a museum dedicated to PAOK basketball club.

Most of people usually call the arena "Palatáki" (Greek: "Παλατάκι", which means "little palace"), due to its comforts and modern construction.

== Directions to the stadium ==
The arena is located in southeast Thessaloniki, Greece, in the Pylaia borough, 7 km from the city centre, and around 1 km from Thessaloniki's International Airport. The arena lies 300 meters off the junction, on a small hill. OASTH's bus lines #2 (starts from KTEL) and #3 (starts from Thessaloniki railway station) provide public transport to the arena. In the longer term, the stadium will also serve the Thessaloniki Metro with the Anotera Scholi Polemou metro station, which is planned to be near the arena.

== Construction of PAOK Sports Arena ==
P.A.O.K. B.C. had to wait 10 years from the laying of the arena's foundations (on March 18, 1990), and 12 years from the time Ioannis Dedeoglou donated the land (June 17, 1988), until the sports arena was complete.

Ioannis and his brother, Thanasis Dedeoglou, first began to think about a new major European sports arena in Thessaloniki in 1991, by donating land to PAOK. A proposal to host the 2000 FIBA EuroLeague Final Four in the new arena, increased the motivation to complete the stadium. FIBA Europe accepted the offer, and the construction was finished in time. The stadium also hosted, earlier that year, the 2000 Greek Cup Final Four, as its first major event.

== Renovations ==
=== 2016 renovation ===
The arena was renovated in 2016, with its interior being repainted in the club's black-and-white colours.

=== 2025 renovation ===
In 2025, during the presidency of Thanasis Hatzopoulos, P.A.O.K. B.C. launched a major refurbishment of the arena ahead of the 2025–26 season. The project included the removal of the former box seating around the court and the installation of 184 new court-side seats, as well as upgrades to the existing court seats behind one of the baskets.

The arena's audiovisual infrastructure was also modernised. Two new electronic scoreboards were installed, together with a permanent four-sided video cube suspended above the playing court. The lighting system was replaced by LED lighting, allowing improved television and photographic conditions as well as the use of lighting effects during games.

Hatzopoulos had announced the project in May 2025, describing the replacement of the scoreboards, the installation of a permanent video cube, the expansion of court-side seating and the introduction of LED lighting as major elements of the planned modernisation.

As part of the same renovation programme, the interior appearance of the main arena was extensively altered. The roof structure was progressively painted black during the summer, while further black-and-white painting works were carried out throughout the arena. By October 2025, the installation of the new scoreboards and video cube had been completed, together with the new court seats, LED lighting and the black-and-white redesign of the interior.

=== 2026 renovation ===
On November 27, 2025, ALPHA SPORTS GROUP, owned by Aristotelis Mystakidis, acquired the majority shareholding of P.A.O.K. B.C. During the summer of 2026, under the club's new ownership, another extensive renovation programme was launched at PAOK Sports Arena. The club described the works as a general renovation, with significant changes also being made to the VIP and court-side seating areas.

The 2026 works include the complete reconstruction of both the home team's and visiting team's locker rooms, along with the creation of a separate locker room for the visiting team's coaching staff. The arena's gym is also being renovated, while the coaches' offices and the general management offices are being redesigned to create new working spaces.

Additional upgrades include the construction of a new doping control room and the reconstruction of the mixed zone. New basketball goals are being installed in the main arena, while the VIP areas are undergoing a complete upgrade aimed at improving spectator comfort and hospitality facilities.

The media facilities are also being extensively redesigned. New press tribunes are being constructed and the arena's press conference room is undergoing a complete renovation. The existing press seating, previously located higher in the stands, is being relocated to a lower position near the players' tunnel. The space made available by this relocation is planned to accommodate additional spectator seating, resulting in a small increase in the arena's seating capacity.

As of July 30, 2026, the renovation programme at PAOK Sports Arena remained in progress.

== Events held ==
=== First Ioannis Dedeoglou Tournament ===
The first tournament took place in 2004, and four teams competed. They were Hemofarm, Panathinaikos, PAOK, and Ülker. The first games took place on September 24, 2004, in which Panathinaikos won against Hemofarm, by a score of 83–79, while PAOK beat Ülker, by a score of 77–57. The very next day, Hemofarm vs. Ulker and PAOK vs. Panathinaikos took place, to decide who would earn the final positions. Hemofarm beat Ulker by a score of 84–74, for its third-place finish, and PAOK beat Panathinaikos in a close game, by a score of 79–76, for first place.

=== Second Ioannis Dedeoglou Tournament ===
The second tournament was held in September 2005. The teams that participated were AEK, FC Barcelona, Red Star Belgrade, and PAOK. On the first day of the tournament, fans got to see a Greek derby between PAOK and AEK, which PAOK won by a score of 77–72. The next game of the day took place between Barcelona and Red Star, in which Barcelona won 77–67. The following day, AEK was pitted against Red Star, and lost 54–75. The final was a real feast for the eyes, as it finished with both teams tied at 87 points; it was a great game, in which Barcelona ended up beating PAOK, in overtime, by a score of 102–101.

=== 2000 Thessaloniki EuroLeague Final Four ===
2000 Thessaloniki EuroLeague Final Four Logo.

PAOK Sports Arena hosted the 2000 Thessaloniki FIBA EuroLeague Final Four.

==== Semifinals ====
- Panathinikos Athens (GRE) – Efes Pilsen (TUR) 81–71
- Maccabi Tel Aviv (ISR) – FC Barcelona (ESP) 65–51

==== Third place game ====
FC Barcelona (Spain) – Efes Pilsen 69–75 (Turkey)

==== Final ====
- Panathinaikos Athens (Greece) – Maccabi Tel Aviv (Israel) 73–67

=== CEV Champions League Final Four ===
PAOK Sports Arena hosted the 2004–05 CEV Champions League Final Four, which took place from 26 to 27 March 2005.

=== Concerts ===
A number of concerts also take place in the arena. Artists that have performed at the arena include the Pet Shop Boys, A-ha and Sakis Rouvas. On the 18 September 2010, The Prodigy performed at the arena, with an attendance of 10,000 people. Moreover, on 27 October 2019 Enrique Iglesias' concert was sold. On the 26th of June, 2023, greek popstar Eleni Foureira performed in the arena as part of her "Reborn" tour, with an attendance of 12,000 people.

== Arena info ==
- The arena's inaugural game was the 2000 Greek Cup semifinal between AEK Athens and Maroussi. AEK won the game, and subsequently went on to win the Greek Cup title.
- The arena's first game featuring PAOK, took place on May 17, 2000, against Panathinaikos.
- Maroussi player, Anatoly Zourpenko, scored the first points that were scored inside PAOK Sports Arena.
- PAOK Sports Arena is the largest privately owned arena in Greece, that has been regularly used to host basketball games at one time or another. The Nikos Galis Olympic Indoor Hall, the Peace and Friendship Stadium, and the SUNEL Arena (the home arenas of Panathinaikos Athens, Olympiacos Piraeus, and AEK Athens) are larger, yet they are the property of the Greek state.

== Gallery ==
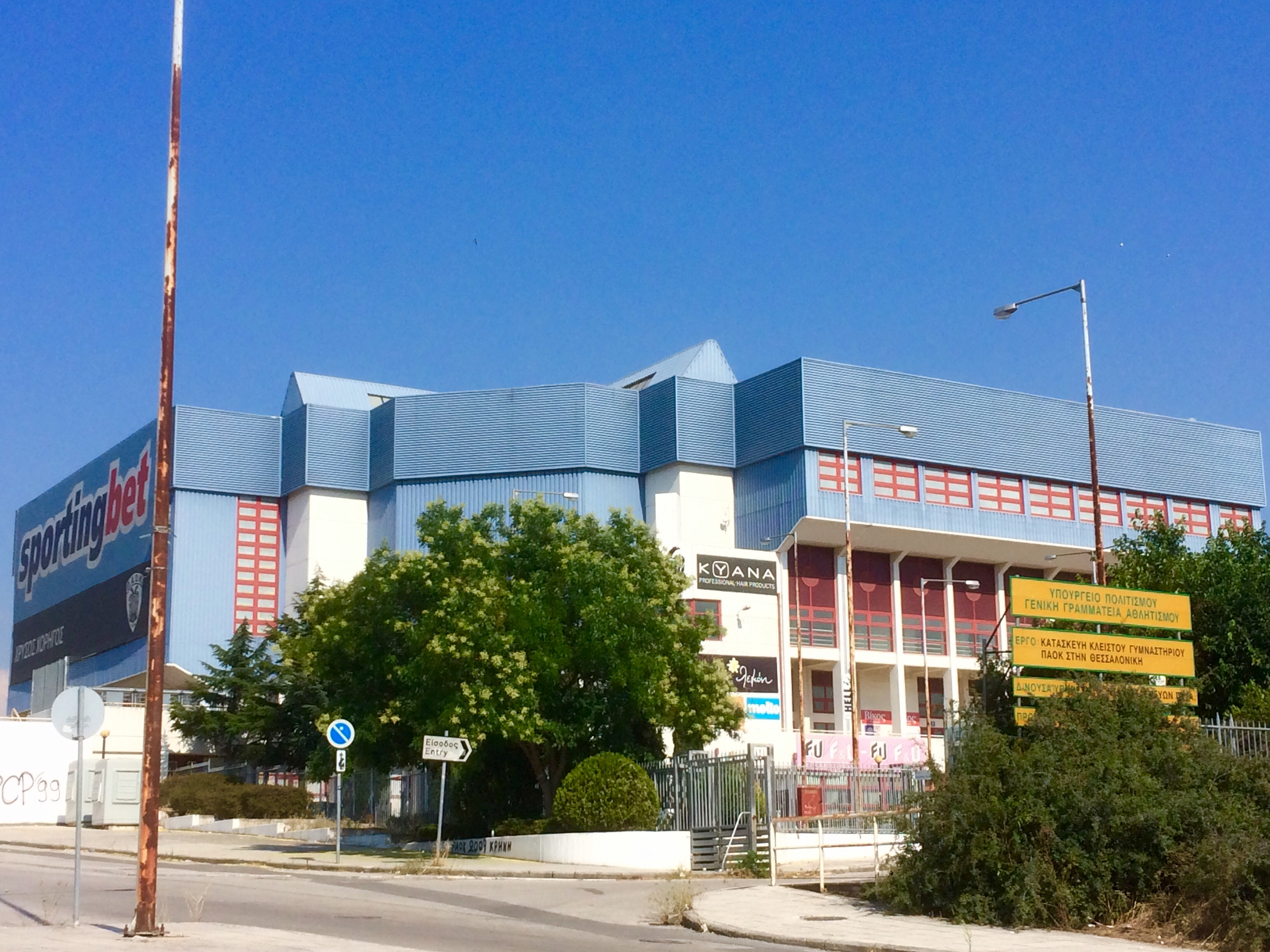
External view

PAOK Sports Arena's Interior

PAOK Sports Arena's Interior

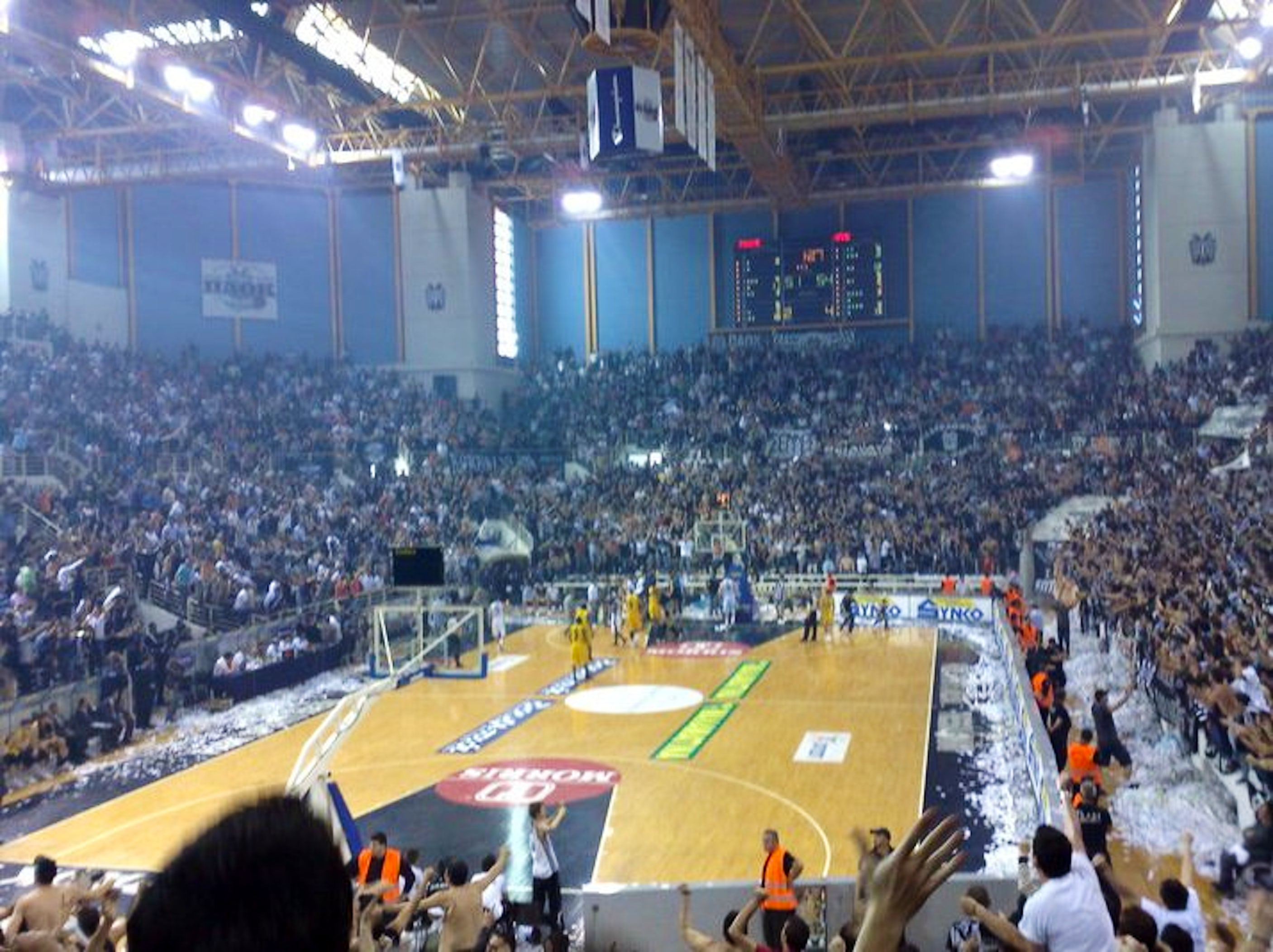
Game between PAOK and Aris, in April 2008

== See also ==
- List of indoor arenas in Greece

Preceded by Olympiahalle; Munich	FIBA EuroLeague; Final Four; Venue; 2000	Succeeded by Palais omnisports de Paris-Bercy; Paris
Preceded by Sports Palace Cosmos; Belgorod	CEV Champions League; Final Venue; 2005	Succeeded by PalaLottomatica; Rome
