= Željko Rebrača =

Serbian basketball player

- Жељко Ребрача
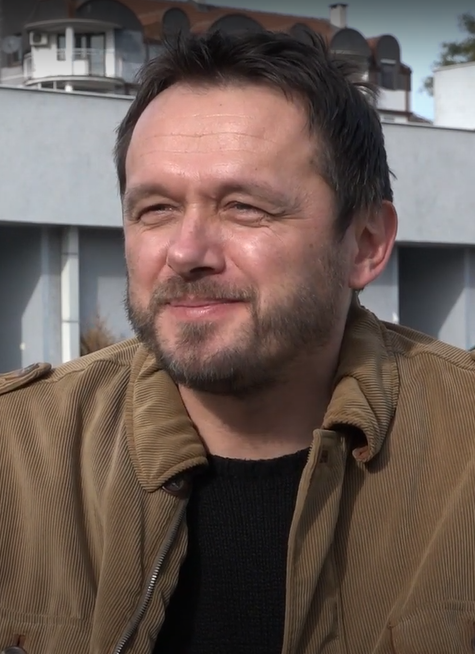
- Rebrača in 2020

Member of the National Assembly
- Incumbent
- Assumed office 6 February 2024

President of KK Vojvodina
- Incumbent
- Assumed office 6 June 2022
- Preceded by: Bogdan Kuzmanović

Personal details
- Born: 9 April 1972 (age 54) Apatin, SR Serbia, SFR Yugoslavia
- Party: SNS (2023–present)
- Basketball career

Personal information
- Listed height: 2.13 m (7 ft 0 in)
- Listed weight: 120 kg (265 lb)

Career information
- NBA draft: 1994: 2nd round, 54th overall pick
- Drafted by: Seattle SuperSonics
- Playing career: 1990–2007
- Position: Center
- Number: 9, 39, 12, 11

Career history
- 1990–1991: NAP Novi Sad
- 1991–1995: Partizan
- 1995–1999: Benetton Treviso
- 1999–2001: Panathinaikos
- 2001–2004: Detroit Pistons
- 2004: Atlanta Hawks
- 2004–2007: Los Angeles Clippers
- 2007: Pamesa Valencia

Career highlights
- 2× EuroLeague champion (1992, 2000); EuroLeague Final Four MVP (2000); 4× FIBA EuroStar (1996–1999); FIBA Saporta Cup champion (1999); LBA champion (1997); Italian Supercup winner (1997); 2× Greek League champion (2000, 2001); Greek League MVP (2000); Greek League Finals MVP (2001); Greek Cup Finals MVP (2000); Greek Cup Finals Top Scorer (2000); 2× Yugoslavian League champion (1992, 1995); 3× Yugoslav Cup winner (1992, 1994, 1995); NBA All-Rookie Second Team (2002)

Career NBA statistics
- Points: 1,276 (5.9 ppg)
- Rebounds: 688 (3.2 rpg)
- FG%: .527
- Stats at NBA.com
- Stats at Basketball Reference
Medals
Men's Basketball
Representing FR Yugoslavia
Olympic Games
Silver medal – second place	1996 Atlanta
FIBA World Cup
Gold medal – first place	1998 Athens
EuroBasket
Gold medal – first place	1995 Greece
Gold medal – first place	1997 Spain

Željko Rebrača (Serbian Cyrillic: Жељко Ребрача; born 9 April 1972) is a Serbian former professional basketball player and currently the president of KK Vojvodina. After playing in Europe and the National Basketball Association (NBA), he concluded his career playing for the Spanish ACB League team Pamesa Valencia.

== Club career ==
=== Europe ===
Rebrača began his professional career in 1991, with KK Partizan. With KK Partizan, he won two Yugo League championships (1992 and 1995), three Yugoslav Cups (1992, 1994 and 1995), and the EuroLeague (1992).

In 1995–99, he played in the Italian League for Benetton Treviso, where he won the Italian League championship in 1997, under coach Mike D'Antoni. He followed up that by winning the Italian Supercup in 1997, and the FIBA Saporta Cup in 1999, while playing under coach Željko Obradović.

He also played for the European basketball giant Panathinaikos, during the 1999–2000 and 2000–01 seasons, winning with them two Greek League championships and one EuroLeague championship, at the EuroLeague Final Four in 2000, which was hosted in Thessaloniki. He was awarded with the EuroLeague Final Four MVP.

=== NBA ===
Rebrača, a 213 cm (7 ft 0 in) center, was a second round (54th overall) draft pick of the Seattle SuperSonics in the 1994 NBA draft. The Sonics immediately traded his NBA rights to the Minnesota Timberwolves, who then traded his rights to the Toronto Raptors in 1999, who in turn, traded his rights to the Detroit Pistons in 2001.

In the NBA, he played for the Detroit Pistons (2001–04), the Atlanta Hawks (2004), and the Los Angeles Clippers (2004–06). His most productive season was his rookie year, in which he averaged 6.9 points and 3.9 rebounds per game, as a member of the Detroit Pistons. His career NBA averages were 5.9 points per game and 3.2 rebounds per game, in 15.3 minutes per game.

Rebrača was plagued with heart problems. Those problems caused him to miss many games in his NBA career, including most of the first half of the 2005–06 NBA season. Rebrača had NBA career highs of 24 points (scored on 10 April 2002), and 16 rebounds (set on 29 January 2005).

=== Return to Europe ===
On 6 April 2007, after being on the injured list through the 2006–07 NBA season, Rebrača was waived by the Clippers, and on 19 June 2007 he signed with Pamesa Valencia, in the Spanish basketball league (ACB). On 17 December 2007 Rebraca announced his retirement from playing the game of basketball.

== National team career ==
Rebrača was a member of the senior men's FR Yugoslavian national team (for which he became one of the Serbian MVPs). He won the gold medal with his national team at both EuroBaskets 1995 and 1997. With FR Yugoslavia, he also won the silver medal at the 1996 Atlanta Summer Olympics, in the United States.

=== 1998 FIBA World Championship ===
Rebrača won the gold medal at the 1998 FIBA World Championship as one of the key players of the depleted Yugoslavia roster that missed most of its ageing stars of the era such as Vlade Divac, Predrag Danilović or Žarko Paspalj, while team captain and 1997 European Championship MVP Aleksandar Đorđević played only limited minutes due to a recent injury.

Rebrača was instrumental in winning the closely fought final game against Russia with a block on Mikhail Mikhailov's dunk attempt, followed by a basket after an offensive rebound and finally, two free throws (despite his subpar 55% foul shooting in previous 8 games in the tournament), all in the final 35 seconds of the game.

Rebrača went on to make the all-tournament team averaging 13.6 points and 9.1 rebounds. With him anchoring the team's defense throughout the tournament (7 blocks against Greece in a second-round game), clutch performances in the semi-finals against Greece (20 points and 13 rebounds) and the finals against Russia (16 points and 11 rebounds along with his late-game heroics), some argued that Rebrača should have been awarded the MVP honors that went to his teammate Dejan Bodiroga instead.

== Post-playing career ==
On 6 June 2022, Vojvodina elected Rebrača as their new club's president.

=== Political engagement ===
In October 2023, Rebrača joined the ruling populist Serbian Progressive Party (SNS) and appeared on SNS coalition's list for the 2023 parliamentary election and was elected to the National Assembly.

== Personal life ==
Rebrača was one of the founding members of the Group Seven Children's Foundation.

His son Filip Rebrača currently plays basketball for KK FMP .

== NBA career statistics ==
Legend
GP	Games played	GS	Games started	MPG	Minutes per game
FG%	Field goal percentage	3P%	3-point field goal percentage	FT%	Free throw percentage
RPG	Rebounds per game	APG	Assists per game	SPG	Steals per game
BPG	Blocks per game	PPG	Points per game	**Bold**	Career high

=== Regular season ===
Year	Team	GP	GS	MPG	FG%	3P%	FT%	RPG	APG	SPG	BPG	PPG
2001–02	Detroit	**74**	4	15.9	.505	–	.771	**3.9**	0.5	**0.4**	**1.0**	6.9
2002–03	Detroit	30	**12**	16.3	.552	–	.792	3.1	0.3	0.2	0.6	6.6
2003–04	Detroit	21	2	10.6	.407	–	.786	2.3	0.2	0.4	0.6	3.1
2003–04	Atlanta	3	0	**17.0**	.522	–	.500	3.0	**0.7**	0.0	0.7	**8.3**
2004–05	L.A. Clippers	58	2	16.0	**.568**	–	**.859**	3.2	0.4	0.2	0.7	5.8
2005–06	L.A. Clippers	29	2	14.2	.542	–	.756	2.2	0.3	0.2	0.7	4.7
Career		215	22	15.3	.527	–	.792	3.2	0.4	0.3	0.7	5.9

=== Playoffs ===
Year	Team	GP	GS	MPG	FG%	3P%	FT%	RPG	APG	SPG	BPG	PPG
2002	Detroit	**5**	0	**13.8**	**.455**	–	**.786**	**2.0**	0.0	**0.2**	0.2	4.2
2003	Detroit	4	0	7.3	.353	–	.714	1.3	0.0	0.0	0.0	**4.3**
2006	L.A. Clippers	3	0	7.3	.333	–	–	1.3	0.0	0.0	**0.3**	0.7
Career		12	0	10.0	.387	–	.762	1.6	0.0	0.1	0.2	3.3

== See also ==
- List of Serbian NBA players
