= 2001 FIBA SuproLeague Final Four =

2001 football tournament of the 2000–01 FIBA SuproLeague

Tournament details
- Arena: Palais de Bercy, Paris, France
- Dates: May 11th - 13th, 2001

Final positions
- Champions: (Israel) Maccabi Tel Aviv (3rd title)
- Runners-up: (Greece) Panathinaikos
- Third place: (Turkey) Efes
- Fourth place: (Russia) CSKA Moscow

Awards and statistics
- MVP: (United States) (Slovenia) Ariel McDonald

The 2001 FIBA SuproLeague Final Four was the concluding tournament of the 2000–01 FIBA SuproLeague. It was the last Final Four tournament that was organized by FIBA Europe.

== Bracket ==
Semi-finals
May 11, Bercy Arena
(Israel) Maccabi Tel Aviv	86
(Russia) CSKA Moscow	80
May 11, Bercy Arena
(Greece) Panathinaikos	74
(Turkey) Efes Pilsen	66

Final
May 13, Bercy Arena
(Israel) Maccabi Tel Aviv	81
(Greece) Panathinaikos	67
Third place
May 13, Bercy Arena
(Turkey) Efes Pilsen	91
(Russia) CSKA Moscow	85

== Semifinals ==
=== Maccabi Tel Aviv – CSKA Moscow ===
May 11
18:00

(Report)

Maccabi Tel Aviv (Israel)	86–80	(Russia) CSKA Moscow
Scoring by quarter: 21–19, 16–24, 23–9, 26–28
Pts: Huffman 17; Rebs: Parker 9 Asts: Parker 7		Pts: Kirilenko 23; Rebs: Kirilenko 11; Asts: Kirilenko 2

Palais de Bercy, Paris, France
Attendance: 13,200
Referees: Carl Jungebrand (FIN), Eduardo Sancha (ESP)

=== Panathinaikos – Efes Pilsen ===
May 11
20:30

(Report)

Panathinaikos (Greece)	74–66	(Turkey) Efes Pilsen
Scoring by quarter: 23–10, 15–13, 15–25, 21–18
Pts: Bodiroga 22; Rebs: Alvertis 6 Asts: Bodiroga 5		Pts: Onan 15; Rebs: Besok 8 Asts: Onan 3

Palais de Bercy, Paris, France
Attendance: 13,200
Referees: Romualdas Brazauskas (LTU), Pascal Dorizon (FRA)

== Third-place game ==
=== Efes Pilsen – CSKA Moscow ===
May 13
18:00

(Report)

Efes Pilsen (Turkey)	91–85	(Russia) CSKA Moscow
Scoring by quarter: 14–17, 29–31, 17–20, 25–23
Pts: Drobnjak 25; Rebs: Besok 9 Asts: Mulaomerović 12		Pts: Morgunov 16; Rebs: Morgunov 12; Asts: Domani 4

Palais de Bercy, Paris, France
Attendance: 13,200
Referees: Romualdas Brazauskas (LTU), Carl Jungebrand (FIN)

== Final ==
=== Maccabi Tel Aviv – Panathinaikos ===
May 13
20:30

(Report)

Maccabi Tel Aviv (Israel)	81–67	(Greece) Panathinaikos
Scoring by quarter: 15–13, 22–10, 17–25, 27–19
Pts: McDonald 21; Rebs: Huffman 9 Asts: McDonald 9		Pts: Bodiroga 27; Rebs: Fotsis 8 Asts: Koch 3

Palais de Bercy, Paris, France
Attendance: 13,200
Referees: Eduardo Sancha (ESP), Pascal Dorizon (FRA)

Maccabi Tel Aviv	Panathinaikos

Starters:			P	R	A
PG	14	(United States) (Slovenia) Ariel McDonald	21	2	9
SG	8	(United States) Anthony Parker	13	6	3
SF	10	(Israel) Tal Burstein	5	3	2
PF	4	(Israel) Nadav Henefeld (C)	7	2	1
C	7	(United States) Nate Huffman	21	9	0
Reserves:			P	R	A
SG	5	(United States) (Israel) Mark Brisker	3	0	0
PG	6	(United States) (Israel) Derrick Sharp	5	0	0
SF	9	(Israel) Gur Shelef	2	2	2
PF	11	(Israel) Elad Savion	DNP		
PF	12	(Federal Republic of Yugoslavia) Velibor Radović	DNP		
PF	13	(Federal Republic of Yugoslavia) (Israel) Radisav Ćurčić	4	2	0
C	15	(United States) David Sternlight	0	0	0
Head coach:
(Israel) Pini Gershon

2000–01 FIBA SuproLeague
Champions

Maccabi Tel Aviv
3rd Title

Starters:			P	R	A
PG	5	(Greece) Georgios Kalaitzis	0	1	2
SG	10	(Federal Republic of Yugoslavia) Dejan Bodiroga	27	8	1
SF	4	(Greece) Fragiskos Alvertis (C)	5	3	1
PF	8	(Greece) Antonis Fotsis	15	8	0
C	12	(Federal Republic of Yugoslavia) Željko Rebrača	0	1	0
Reserves:			P	R	A
PG	6	(Germany) Michael Koch	9	3	3
C	7	(United States) (Spain) Johnny Rogers	2	2	0
SG	9	(Italy) Nando Gentile	3	1	3
PF	11	(United States) (Spain) Darryl Middleton	0	1	0
C	13	(Republic of Ireland) (United States) Pat Burke	2	1	0
PF	14	(Greece) Ioannis Rodostoglou	DNP		
SF	15	(Greece) Georgios Balogiannis	0	0	0
Head coach:
(Serbia and Montenegro) Željko Obradović

== Awards ==
=== FIBA SuproLeague Final Four MVP ===
- (United States) (Slovenia) Ariel McDonald ( (Israel) Maccabi Tel Aviv)

=== FIBA SuproLeague Finals Top Scorer ===
- (Federal Republic of Yugoslavia) Dejan Bodiroga ( (Greece) Panathinaikos)

=== FIBA SuproLeague All-Final Four Team ===
FIBA SuproLeague All-Final Four Team
Player	Team	Ref.
(United States) (Slovenia) Ariel McDonald (Final Four MVP)	Maccabi Tel Aviv	
(United States) Anthony Parker	Maccabi Tel Aviv	
(Federal Republic of Yugoslavia) Dejan Bodiroga	Panathinaikos	
(Russia) Andrei Kirilenko	CSKA Moscow	
(United States) Nate Huffman	Maccabi Tel Aviv	
