= Anthony Parker =

American basketball player (born 1975)

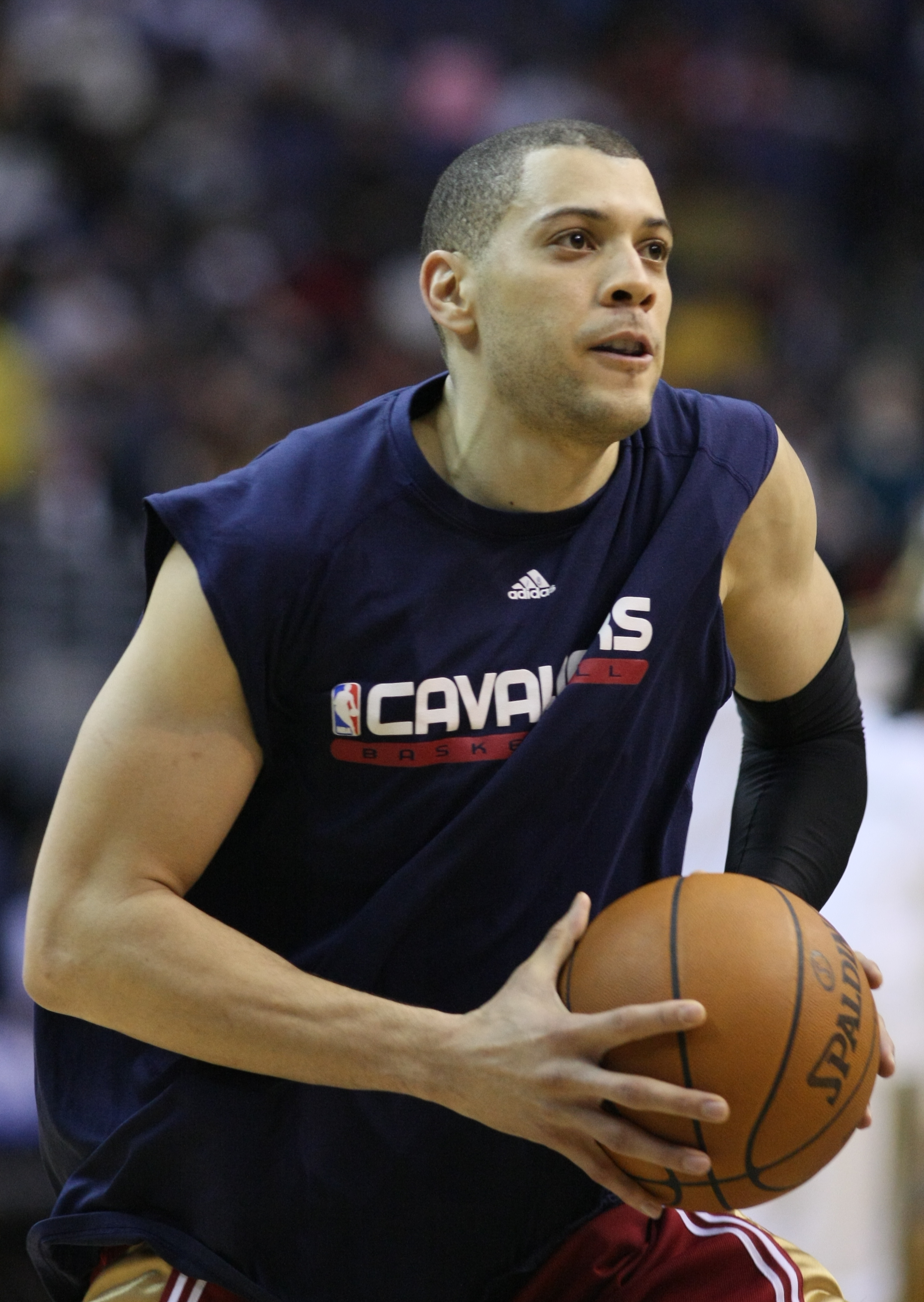
- Parker with the Cleveland Cavaliers in 2009

Orlando Magic
- Title: General manager
- League: NBA

Personal information
- Born: June 19, 1975 (age 51) Naperville, Illinois, U.S.
- Listed height: 6 ft 6 in (1.98 m)
- Listed weight: 210 lb (95 kg)

Career information
- High school: Naperville Central (Naperville, Illinois)
- College: Bradley (1993–1997)
- NBA draft: 1997: 1st round, 21st overall pick
- Drafted by: New Jersey Nets
- Playing career: 1997–2012
- Position: Shooting guard / small forward
- Number: 12, 24, 8, 18

Career history
- 1997–1999: Philadelphia 76ers
- 1999–2000: Orlando Magic
- 2000: Quad City Thunder
- 2000–2002: Maccabi Tel Aviv
- 2002–2003: Lottomatica Roma
- 2003–2006: Maccabi Tel Aviv
- 2006–2009: Toronto Raptors
- 2009–2012: Cleveland Cavaliers

Career highlights
- 2× EuroLeague champion (2004, 2005); FIBA SuproLeague champion (2001); 2× EuroLeague MVP (2005, 2006); EuroLeague Final Four MVP (2004); EuroLeague Finals Top Scorer (2004); 2× All-EuroLeague First Team (2005, 2006); EuroLeague 2000–10 All-Decade Team (2010); 50 Greatest EuroLeague Contributors (2008); EuroLeague 25th Anniversary Team (2025); 5× Israeli Super League champion (2001, 2002, 2004–2006); 5× Israeli Cup winner (2001, 2002, 2004–2006); Israeli Super League MVP (2004); 3× Israeli Super League Quintet (2002, 2004, 2005); MVC Player of the Year (1996)
- Stats at NBA.com
- Stats at Basketball Reference

Anthony Michael Parker (born June 19, 1975) is an American professional basketball executive who is the general manager of the Orlando Magic and former professional basketball player who played in the National Basketball Association (NBA), as well as in Italy and Israel.

Prior to graduating from Bradley University with a major in liberal arts, he entered the 1997 NBA draft and played briefly in the NBA before plying his trade in Europe. There, Parker spent five seasons with the Israeli Super League basketball club Maccabi Tel Aviv and one season with the Italian Serie A club Lottomatica Roma. With Maccabi he won five Israeli Super League national championships, five Israeli National Cups, three European-wide titles (two EuroLeague Basketball titles, in 2004 and 2005, and the FIBA SuproLeague title in 2001), and was voted two consecutive times EuroLeague MVP. He was also named the 2004 Israeli Basketball Premier League MVP.

After returning to the NBA as a free agent in 2006, Parker was the Toronto Raptors' starting shooting guard. In his first season with the Raptors, Parker helped the team clinch their first-ever division title, first NBA playoffs berth in five years, and best regular-season record in franchise history. He helped the Raptors reach the playoffs again in the 2007–08 season, before becoming a free agent in 2009.

On June 27, 2012, Anthony Parker retired after playing nine seasons in the NBA, five seasons in Israel, and one season in Italy. He then became a scout for the Orlando Magic from 2012 to 2017. In 2017, he became the general manager of the Lakeland Magic, the Orlando Magic's NBA G League developmental team. In 2021, he was moved to Orlando as an assistant general manager. In 2023, he was promoted to General Manager of the Magic.

== Biography ==
=== Early basketball career ===
Parker started out playing high school basketball at Naperville Central High School. He then played college basketball at Bradley University where he established himself as a top player, averaging 18.9 points per game (ppg) and shooting 42% from the three-point line in his third season, earning the Missouri Valley Conference (MVC) Most Valuable Player and All-MVC first team honors in the same season. His outstanding performances for the Braves ensured that he became one of 15 players honored in Bradley's All-Century basketball team named in 2003. Academically, Parker also excelled. He majored in chemistry before switching to liberal arts and sciences in his senior year, and earned two Major Robert H. Lawrence Jr. Scholarships while at Bradley.

Parker entered the 1997 NBA draft after four years at Bradley and was selected 21st overall by the New Jersey Nets, but he was immediately traded to the Philadelphia 76ers in a multi-player trade. In his two seasons with the 76ers, Parker was largely plagued by injury and played in only 39 regular season games, averaging just over five minutes a game and totaling 74 points and 26 rebounds. He was subsequently traded together with Harvey Grant to the Orlando Magic for Billy Owens before the 1999–2000 season. Parker again struggled at Orlando, playing only 16 games with modest averages of 3.6 ppg and 1.7 rebounds per game (rpg) before being released in January 2000. He finished the remainder of the season with the Quad City Thunder of the Continental Basketball Association where he averaged 11.5 points in 26 games.

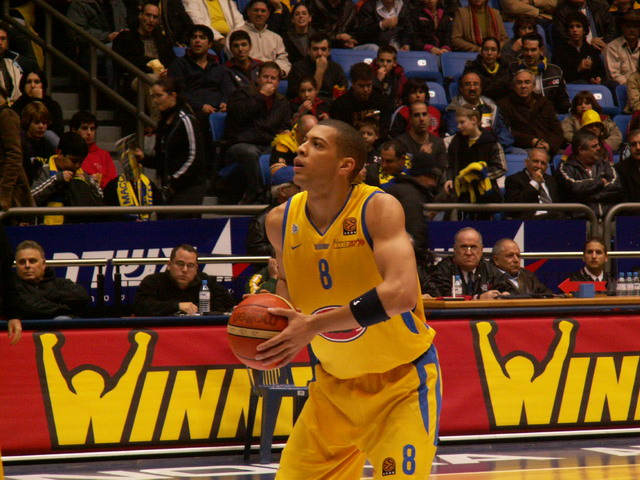
Parker led the Israeli league team Maccabi to a number of domestic and European honors in his five years with the club.

=== European career ===
Disappointed in his failure to make a breakthrough in the NBA, Parker turned to Europe to resurrect his basketball career, intending to return to the NBA after a good season with a European club. Eventually, he moved to Israel in the 2000–01 season, where he was signed by the Israeli EuroLeague powerhouse Maccabi Tel Aviv. Initially, Parker and his wife were intimidated by the occasional bomb attacks in the city, but they soon settled in and Parker was able to focus on his basketball career.

Within his first season with his new club, he became one of their most pivotal players. Parker was signed to fill the void left by Doron Sheffer's retirement at the shooting guard position, but ended up featuring as both a scorer and play-maker for Maccabi. He immediately brought to the team his ability to score, rebound, block shots, and even entertain the crowds with slam dunks. In Parker's inaugural season, Maccabi won the Israeli domestic championship and the Israeli National Cup, as well as the FIBA SuproLeague Cup.

He continued his fine form for the club in the 2001–02 season, averaging 16.4 points per game and 5.2 rebounds per game as Maccabi again won both domestic titles and even reached the Euroleague 2001–02 Final Four.

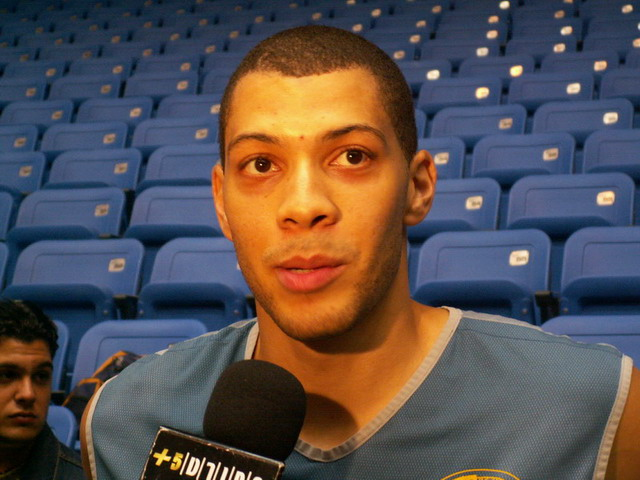
Parker in an interview with the Israeli press

Parker left Israel in 2002, and in January 2003 moved to Italy, where he signed with Virtus Roma, playing in 27 Italian Serie A league games and averaging 14.5 points per game and 5.6 rebounds per game.

However, half a year later Parker longed a return to Israel, a country he had grown to love. Back with Maccabi, he helped his team accomplish two more Triple Crowns by winning the Israeli domestic championship, the Israeli National Cup, and the EuroLeague championship in both 2004 and 2005. In the process, he was named the Israeli Basketball Super League MVP and the EuroLeague Final Four MVP of the Euroleague 2003–04 season, as well as the EuroLeague MVP and first-team All-EuroLeague in the Euroleague 2004–05 season.

The 2004–05 season also proved to be a watershed season for Parker, as he averaged career-highs of 18.0 points per game, 5.3 rebounds per game, and 3.6 assists per game.

In his final season with Maccabi, he led the team to another domestic double, but in the Euroleague 2005–06 season's championship game, Maccabi was defeated 73–69 by CSKA Moscow. For his efforts, Parker was named EuroLeague MVP and first team All-EuroLeague for the second consecutive time. After six years of success in Europe however, Parker dreamed of returning to the NBA. Overall, he averaged 13.6 points per game, 4.8 rebounds per game and 1.8 steals per game in his Israeli league career, while averaging 15.8 points per game, 5.7 rebounds per game and 1.6 steals per game in the EuroLeague. He made the 50 Greatest EuroLeague Contributors list in 2008, and the EuroLeague 2000–10 All-Decade Team in 2010.

Parker's experience playing in Israel left a positive impression upon him. He went on to wear jersey number 18 for both Toronto and Cleveland, explaining that: "I played in Israel before I came back to the NBA, and I had such a great time... two of my sons were born while I was playing overseas and one was actually born in Israel. And I just had such a great experience that I wanted to take something from that experience. The number 18, in Judaism, it means 'chai'... and it's the symbol for life and good fortune in Judaism. And I thought that was something to take away from Israel and let them know I'm still representing them."

=== Return to the NBA ===
==== Toronto Raptors ====
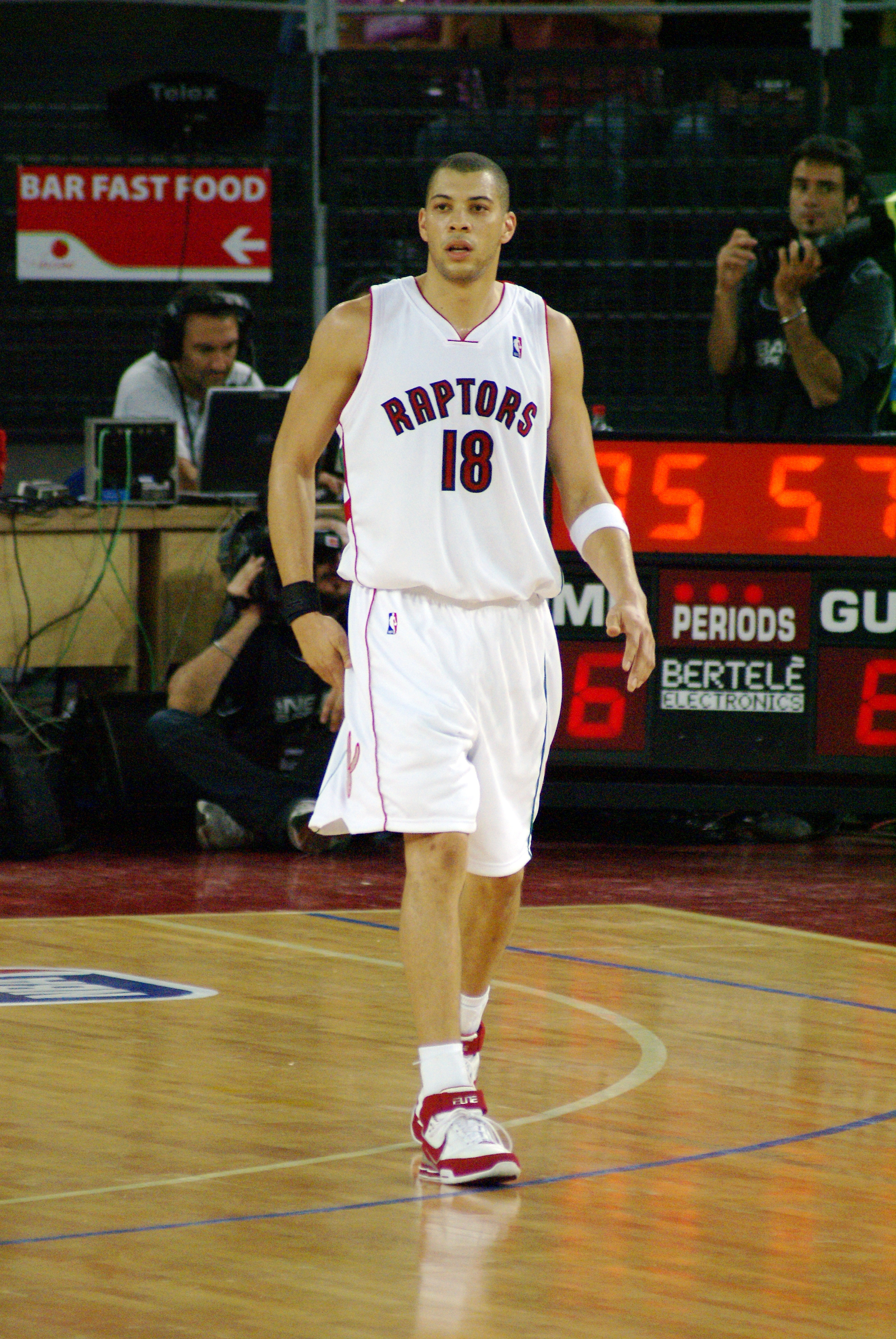
Anthony Parker during his tenure with the Raptors

In October 2005, during a pre-season friendly representing Maccabi against the Toronto Raptors organized by then Israeli Consul-General Cobie Brosh, Parker hit the game-winning shot with less than a second remaining to lead Maccabi to a 105–103 win at the Air Canada Centre. This gave the Raptors fans and management a glimpse of his abilities and in July 2006, Parker was officially signed by Raptors general manager Bryan Colangelo as a free agent as part of a massive revamp of the 2006–07 Toronto team. He was signed for approximately US$12 million over three years, joining recent European veteran acquisitions Jorge Garbajosa and José Calderón on the team. Adopting a #18 jersey, Parker quickly established himself as the starting shooting guard for Toronto and a well-respected three-point shooter in the NBA, ranking fourth in the league for three-point field goal percentage by the end of the regular season. Overall, in his first season with Toronto, he averaged 12.4 ppg, 3.9 rpg, and 2.1 apg, leading his team in three-point field goal percentage and free throw percentage. Parker's defensive and offensive versatility were credited as instrumental in helping the Raptors clinch their first-ever division title, first NBA playoffs berth in five years, as well as best regular-season record in franchise history.

He didn't make it in the NBA basically and had to go back to Europe to establish himself and came back at the age of 31. Here's a guy that supposedly wasn't good enough to be in the NBA and he went from Euroleague player to NBA starter. He took advantage of his opportunity and it was the right fit for this team.

— Bryan Colangelo, Raptors GM

In the first round of the 2007 NBA Playoffs, Parker was chosen to defend New Jersey Net and former Toronto favorite Vince Carter. Parker was effective in shutting down Carter, restricting him to 13-for-43 shooting in the first two games. However, the Raptors were eliminated by the Nets after Game 6.

On April 4, 2007, the NBA also announced that Parker had been selected by a five-member panel of former players as the divisional winner of 2006–07 NBA Sportsmanship Award. The annual award reflects the ideals of sportsmanship in amateur and professional basketball.

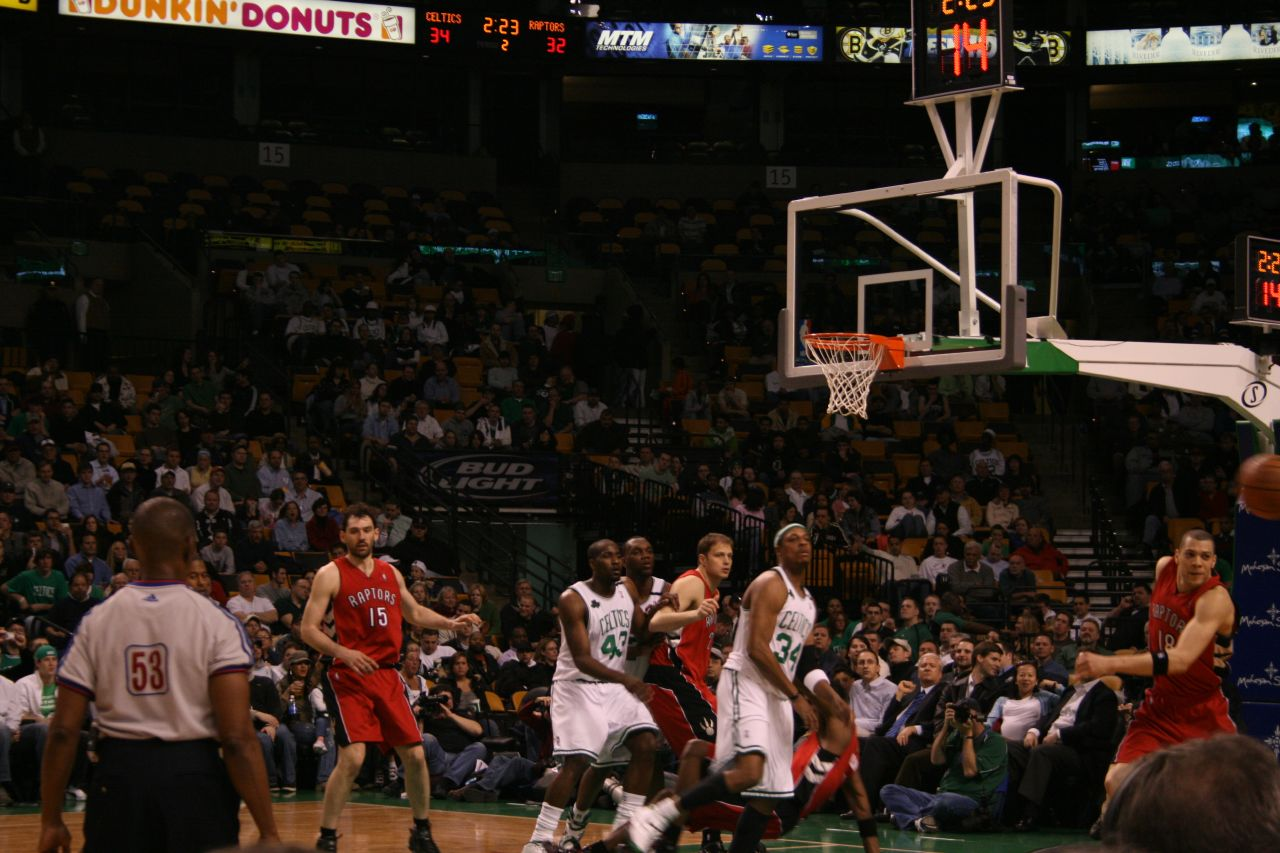
On his return to the NBA, Parker (far right) became the starting shooting guard for the Raptors.

In the 2007–08 season, Parker remained—despite the signing of Miami's Jason Kapono—the starting shooting guard for the Raptors, with rookie Jamario Moon completing the wing positions. In a season that was fraught with lengthy injuries to a number of his teammates (such as T. J. Ford and Chris Bosh), he managed to play in all 82 regular season games and ensured that Toronto made the 2008 NBA Playoffs, albeit as the sixth seed. However, the Raptors were eliminated in the first round by the Orlando Magic in five games. Parker was later named by ESPN as one of the best Euroleague players to have graced the NBA.

At the end of the 2007–08 season, he ranked 7th in NBA's all-time leaders in three-point field goal percentage.

Parker played a variety of roles in the following season. First, Kapono was temporarily moved to the starting shooting guard spot after the Raptors fired head coach Sam Mitchell. When Calderón was injured, Parker had to fill in as the starting point guard. After struggling in December, he hit good form in January and helped the Raptors inch towards a better record after the team went 16–28. Although Parker eventually regained his starting spot, Toronto fell further behind the playoff race as a result of changing rosters and inconsistent performances, dropping to 21–34 just before the All-Star break. The shooting guard's offensive output was also erratic throughout the season, and the Raptors all but fell out of the playoffs picture by March. The Raptors eventually concluded the regular season with only 33 wins, with Parker suffering a significant drop in his numbers (shooting percentage and points per game). His future remained uncertain as he was due to become a free agent, but he expressed a desire to return to Toronto for the next season. With Toronto selecting shooting guard DeMar DeRozan in the 2009 NBA draft, that uncertainty was compounded.

==== Cleveland Cavaliers ====
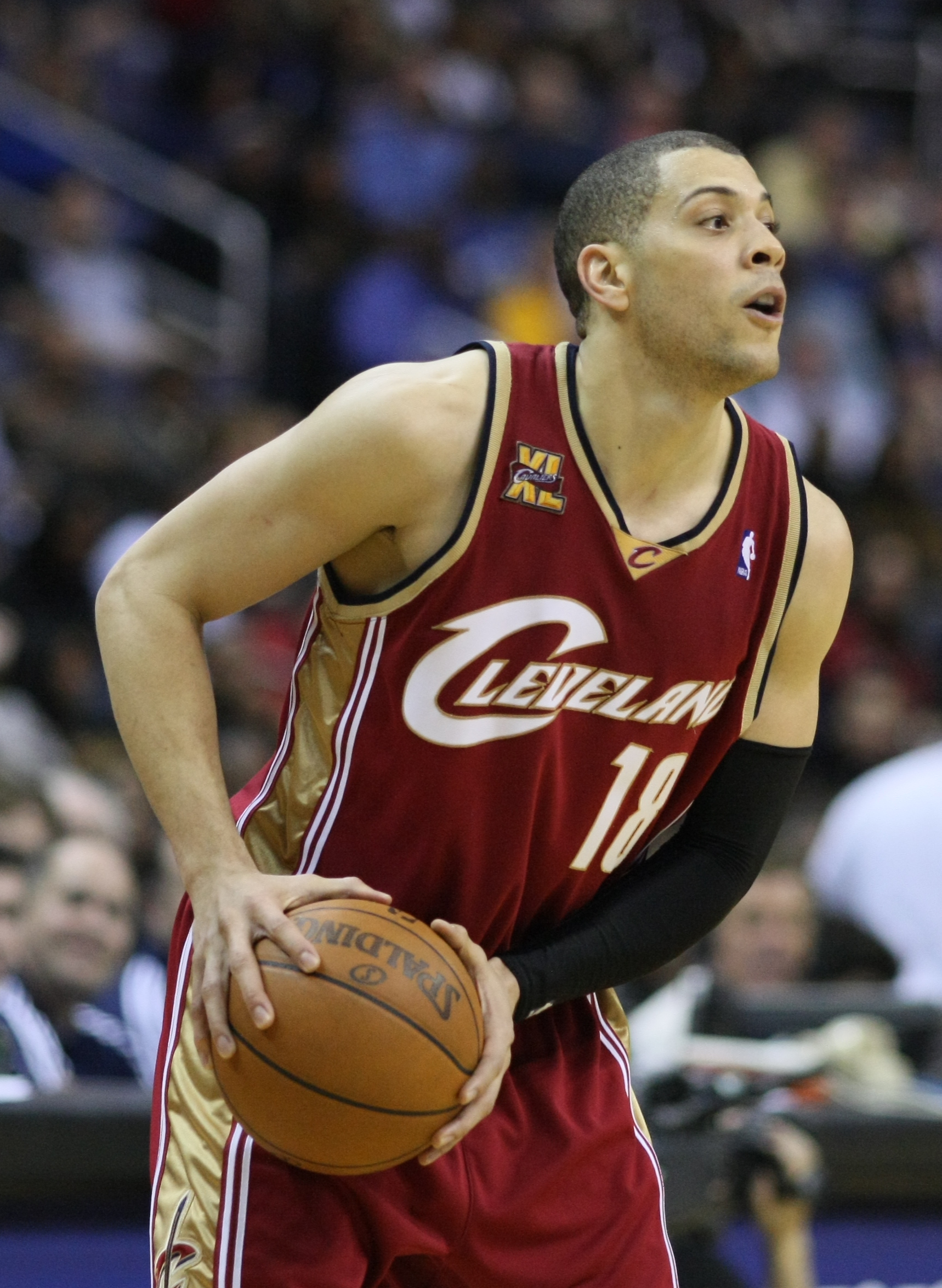
Parker as a Cavalier in a game against the Wizards on November 18, 2009

On July 13, 2009, Parker signed a two-year, $6 million deal with the LeBron James-led Cleveland Cavaliers, a team that had reached the 2007 NBA Finals and 2009 Conference Finals. Cleveland General Manager Danny Ferry said of Parker: "Anthony will be a solid addition to our roster. He is a very good, intelligent all-around basketball player. Our coaching staff will especially appreciate the good shooting and solid defense that Anthony brings to our team." In a bid to ensure that James had his best shot of winning a title before he could potentially become a free agent after the season, Cleveland also acquired Shaquille O'Neal and subsequently, Antawn Jamison, both of whom were veteran superstars. The new-look Cleveland concluded the regular season with a league-high 61 wins, with Parker starting all 81 games that he played in. In the first round of the playoffs, they defeated Chicago in five games. Cleveland faced the 2008 champions Boston in the next round, and despite expectations to prevail over the aging Celtics, Cleveland lost the series 4–2. Parker started all 11 of Cleveland's playoff games.

During the 2010 NBA offseason, LeBron James and Zydrunas Ilgauskas left Cleveland for the Miami Heat, which led several other veterans to also leave the team. The departures would thrust Parker, Antawn Jamison and Anderson Varejão into the spotlight as the veteran leaders for the young team. While Cleveland only managed a conference-worst 19–63 season, they were able to upset LeBron James' heavily favored Miami Heat on March 29, 2011, in a game where Parker grabbed eight rebounds and scored 20 points.

On June 27, 2012, Parker announced his retirement.

=== National team career ===
Parker had a brief stint with the junior United States men's national basketball team, as a college player. He was a member of the Under-22 team alongside future NBA All-Stars Tim Duncan and Paul Pierce. The team defeated host and co-favorite Puerto Rico, twice in the FIBA Americas Under-21 Championship, and captured the gold medal in 1996, en route to qualifying for the 1997 FIBA Under-21 World Cup. In the gold medal game, Parker scored a game-high 19 points, in a win against Canada.

=== Executive career ===
Parker was the scout of the Orlando Magic following his retirement in 2012 and fulfilled that role until 2017, when he was promoted to become the G League general manager. He served in that role until 2021 when he became an assistant general manager back with the Orlando team. On July 5, 2023, the Magic officially announced that they have promoted Parker as the next general manager replacing John Hammond who was promoted to Senior Advisor to the President of Basketball Operations.

== Personal life ==
Parker was born in Naperville, Illinois. His father played college basketball at the University of Iowa, while his mother was a cheerleader. Parker's younger siblings also played basketball; his brother Marcus played basketball in high school, while his sister Candace played in the WNBA and was the number one pick of the 2008 draft. Early in his professional basketball career, Parker married Tamy, and they had their first child in 2002. Parker is Christian.

== Career statistics ==
Legend
GP	Games played	GS	Games started	MPG	Minutes per game
FG%	Field-goal percentage	3P%	3-point field-goal percentage	FT%	Free-throw percentage
RPG	Rebounds per game	APG	Assists per game	SPG	Steals per game
BPG	Blocks per game	PPG	Points per game	PIR	Performance index rating
**Bold**	Career high

†	Denotes seasons in which Parker won the EuroLeague\FIBA SuproLeague
	Led the league

=== NBA ===
==== Regular season ====
Year	Team	GP	GS	MPG	FG%	3P%	FT%	RPG	APG	SPG	BPG	PPG
1997–98	Philadelphia	37	0	5.3	.397	.321	.650	.7	.5	.3	.1	1.9
1998–99	Philadelphia	2	0	1.5	**1.000**	.000	.000	.0	.0	.0	.0	1.0
1999–00	Orlando	16	0	11.6	.421	.071	.727	1.7	.6	.5	**.3**	3.6
2006–07	Toronto	73	73	**33.4**	.477	**.441**	**.835**	3.9	2.1	1.0	.2	12.4
2007–08	Toronto	**82***	**82***	32.1	.476	.438	.816	**4.1**	2.2	1.0	.2	**12.5**
2008–09	Toronto	80	71	33.0	.426	.390	.834	4.0	**3.4**	**1.3**	.2	10.7
2009–10	Cleveland	81	81	27.5	.434	.414	.789	2.9	1.9	.8	.2	7.3
2010–11	Cleveland	72	65	29.0	.399	.379	.779	3.0	3.0	.9	.1	8.3
2011–12	Cleveland	51	51	25.1	.433	.362	.625	2.7	2.4	.7	.1	7.2
Career		494	423	27.8	.444	.404	.794	3.2	2.3	.9	.2	9.1

==== Playoffs ====
Year	Team	GP	GS	MPG	FG%	3P%	FT%	RPG	APG	SPG	BPG	PPG
2007	Toronto	6	6	**40.0**	.419	.400	.795	5.3	1.0	**1.5**	.3	**15.2**
2008	Toronto	5	5	39.2	.408	.294	**.857**	**6.0**	**2.0**	.8	**.4**	11.4
2010	Cleveland	**11**	**11**	30.1	**.436**	**.455**	.733	2.4	1.3	.8	.3	8.3
Career		22	22	34.8	.434	.407	.794	4.0	1.4	1.0	.3	10.9

==== Career highs ====
- Points: **27** vs. Chicago 04/08/07
- Rebounds: **11** @ Indiana 02/25/08
- Assists: **9** 3 times
- Steals: **4** 8 times
- Blocks: **2** 11 times

=== FIBA SuproLeague ===
Year	Team	GP	GS	MPG	FG%	3P%	FT%	RPG	APG	SPG	BPG	PPG
2000–01†	Maccabi	24	24	31.5	.476	.364	.775	5.3	2.2	1.4	0.5	14.7

=== EuroLeague ===
Year	Team	GP	GS	MPG	FG%	3P%	FT%	RPG	APG	SPG	BPG	PPG	PIR
2001–02	Maccabi	20	19	34.6	.504	.339	.726	5.2	1.6	1.6	.3	16.4	17.5
2003–04†	Maccabi	21	21	35.1	.542	**.490**	**.870**	5.8	3.5	1.2	.4	16.0	22.2
2004–05†	Maccabi	24	24	34.7	**.545**	.476	.856	5.3	3.6	**2.0**	**.6**	**18.0**	**24.9**
2005–06	Maccabi	**25**	**25**	**35.5**	.522	.365	.787	**6.9**	**3.8**	1.7	.2	14.8	20.5
Career		90	89	35.0	.528	.411	.818	5.8	3.2	1.6	.4	16.3	21.4

== See also ==
- List of National Basketball Association career 3-point field goal percentage leaders
