= Nate Huffman =

American basketball player (1975–2015)

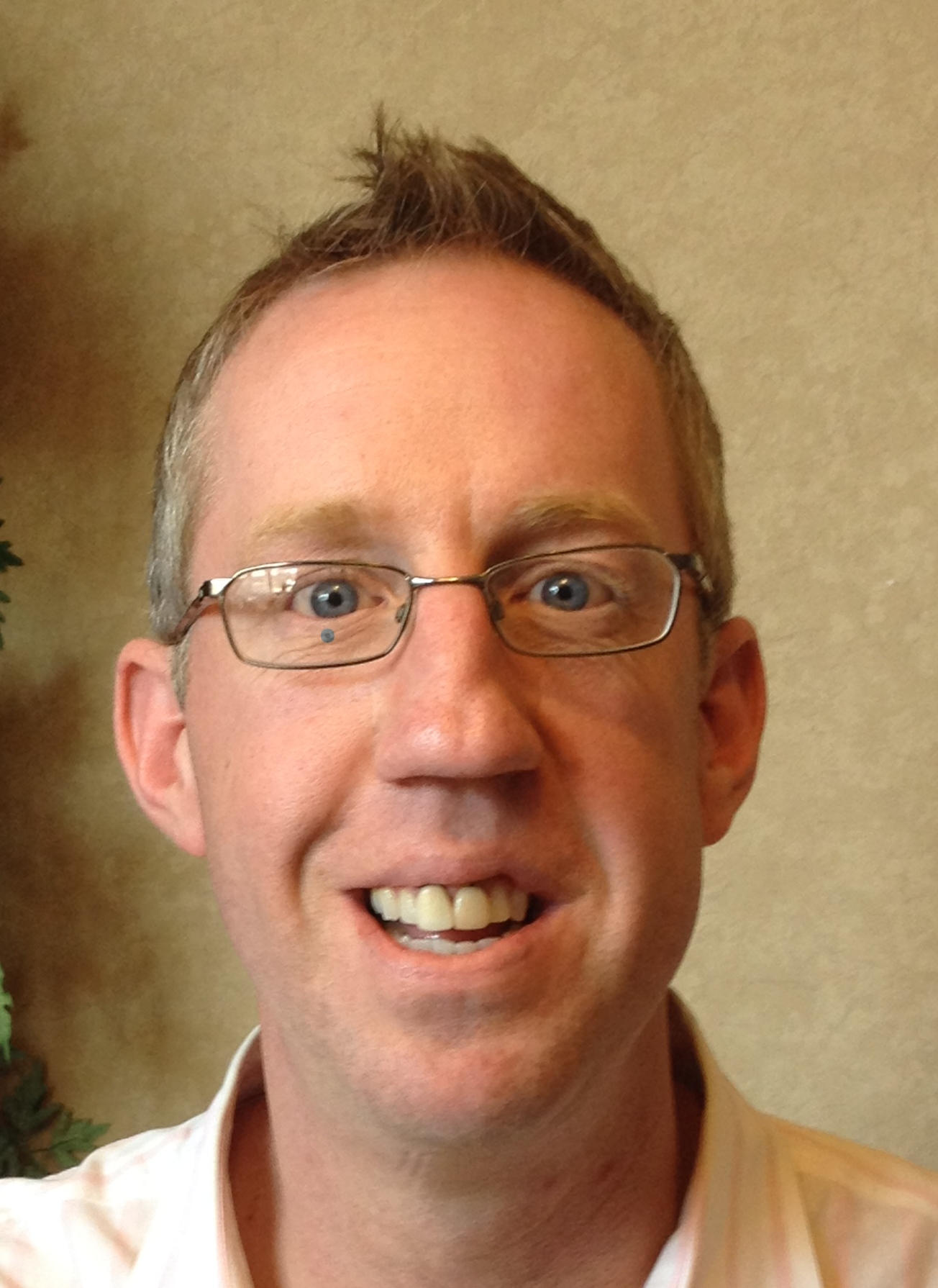
- Huffman in 2014

Personal information
- Born: April 2, 1975 Battle Creek, Michigan, U.S.
- Died: October 15, 2015 (aged 40) Battle Creek, Michigan, U.S.
- Listed height: 7 ft 1 in (2.16 m)
- Listed weight: 245 lb (111 kg)

Career information
- High school: Lakeview (Battle Creek, Michigan)
- College: Lansing CC (1993–1995); Central Michigan (1995–1997)
- NBA draft: 1997: undrafted
- Playing career: 1997–2003
- Position: Center
- Number: 14, 7

Career history
- 1997–1998: Idaho Stampede
- 1998–1999: Fuenlabrada
- 1999–2002: Maccabi Tel Aviv
- 2002–2003: Toronto Raptors

Career highlights
- FIBA SuproLeague champion (2001); FIBA SuproLeague Player of the Year (2001); 3× Israeli Super League champion (2000–2002); 3× Israeli State Cup winner (2000–2002); Israeli Super League MVP (2001); 2× Israeli Super League Quintet (2000, 2001); 2× Israeli Super League All-Star (1999, 2001); Israeli Super League All-Star Game MVP (1999); CBA All-Rookie Team (1998)
- Stats at NBA.com
- Stats at Basketball Reference

Nathaniel Thomas Huffman (April 2, 1975 – October 15, 2015) was an American professional basketball player, who played most of his career with Maccabi Tel Aviv. He was the 2001 Israeli Basketball Premier League MVP, as well as the 2001 FIBA SuproLeague Player of the Year.

== High school and college career ==
Huffman played for Lakeview High School and then for Lansing Community College (where in '94–'95 he averaged 29.8 points, 14.5 rebounds, and 6 blocks per game while shooting 66.8% from the field for the Stars, and was named to the JUCO All America team). He then played for Central Michigan University from 1995 until 1997 (where in '96–'97 he averaged 17.2 points, 11 rebounds (leading the Mid-America Conference in rebounding), and 1.8 blocks per game, and was named to the MAC Conference 1st team).

== Professional career ==
After college, Huffman signed as a free agent with the Los Angeles Clippers, but did not make the team. In the 1997–98 season, he played for the Idaho Stampede of the CBA. He was second in the league in blocked shots per game (1.8), 6th in field goal percentage (.553), 8th in rebounds per game (7.6), and 10th in free throw percentage (.801). He was selected to the CBA All-Rookie Team in 1998.

He then moved to Europe, and played for Baloncesto Fuenlabrada of the Spanish ACB League.

In the 1999–00 season, he was signed by Maccabi Tel Aviv. During his time in Israel, he won three Israeli Premier League championships and Israeli State Cups, and one European FIBA SuproLeague title (2001; when he averaged 17.5 points and 9 rebounds, while playing 30 minutes per game, as the team was 21–3). He was named the FIBA SuproLeague Player of the Year, as well as the "Best American Player in Europe", by Basket News, in 2001.

After his successes in Israel, he was signed in July 2002, by the Toronto Raptors of the NBA to a 3-year, $5.2 million contract (the third year being a team option), and appeared in 7 games, averaging 3.3 points, 3.3 rebounds and 10.9 minutes. Shortly after, Huffman was released by Toronto which terminated his contract in January 2003, because team management charged that he hid a knee injury from them when he signed the contract. Huffman responded by suing them in 2003. In February 2004 an arbitrator ruled that the Raptors were responsible for Huffman's contract.

== Later life and death ==
After his basketball career, he decided to fund a basketball camp for children in 2005, with retired Romanian-Israeli basketball player Constantin Popa. Huffman was awarded in 2010, by the Michigan Jewish Sports Foundation, with the Book of Life Award.

On September 29, 2015, Huffman announced that he had Stage 4 bladder cancer, and his "condition is terminal". He died on October 15, 2015.

== Career statistics ==
Legend
GP	Games played	GS	Games started	MPG	Minutes per game
FG%	Field goal percentage	3P%	3-point field goal percentage	FT%	Free throw percentage
RPG	Rebounds per game	APG	Assists per game	SPG	Steals per game
BPG	Blocks per game	PPG	Points per game	**Bold**	Career high

=== NBA ===
==== Regular season ====
Year	Team	GP	GS	MPG	FG%	3P%	FT%	RPG	APG	SPG	BPG	PPG
2002–03	Toronto	7	0	10.9	.360	–	.625	3.3	.7	.1	.4	3.3
