= EuroLeague Final Four records =

Records in European men's basketball

EuroLeague Final Four records are the records of the EuroLeague's Final Four tournament. The EuroLeague is the European-wide top-tier level men's professional club basketball league. The EuroLeague Final Four has been held every year since 1988, as it was held for the first time in the modern EuroLeague era, at the conclusion of the league's 1987–88 season, with the 1988 EuroLeague Final Four.

== Individual records (1988–2026) ==
=== Points scored ===
Points Scored (Single Final Four)
Most Points Scored in a Final	Most Points Scored in a Semifinal	Most Points Scored in a Final Four
(Turkey) Shane Larkin (Anadolu Efes); 29 points, 2019	(United States) Bob McAdoo (Tracer Milano); 39 points, 1988	(Greece) Nikos Galis (Aris); 69 points / 34.5 PPG, 1990
(Bulgaria) Aleksandar Vezenkov (Olympiacos); 29 points, 2023	(United States) Dominique Wilkins (Panathinaikos); 35 points, 1996	(Greece) Nikos Galis (Aris); 67 points / 33.5 PPG, 1988
(Italy) Nicolò Melli (Fenerbahçe); 28 points, 2018	(United States) Kevin Magee (Maccabi Tel Aviv); 34 points, 1988	(United States) Bob McAdoo (Tracer Milano); 64 points / 32.0 PPG, 1988
(Argentina) Manu Ginóbili (Kinder Bologna); 27 points, 2002	(France) Evan Fournier (Olympiacos); 31 points, 2025	(Greece) Nikos Galis (Aris); 61 points / 30.5 PPG, 1989
(Federal Republic of Yugoslavia) Dejan Bodiroga (Panathinaikos); 27 points, 2001	(France) Nando De Colo (CSKA Moscow); 30 points, 2016	(Ukraine) Alexander Volkov (Panathinaikos); 61 points / 30.5 PPG, 1994
(France) Antoine Rigaudeau (Kinder Bologna); 27 points, 1999	(Turkey) Shane Larkin (Anadolu Efes); 30 points, 2019	(Turkey) Shane Larkin (Anadolu Efes); 59 points / 29.5 PPG, 2019
(Socialist Federal Republic of Yugoslavia) Zoran Savić (Pop 84); 27 points, 1991	(Lithuania) Ramūnas Šiškauskas (CSKA Moscow); 29 points, 2009	(United States) David Rivers (Olympiacos); 54 points / 27.0 PPG, 1997
(Montenegro) Tyrese Rice (Maccabi Tel Aviv); 26 points, 2014	(United States) Darren Daye (Scavolini Pesaro); 29 points, 1991	(Israel) Doron Jamchi (Maccabi Tel Aviv); 53 points / 26.5 PPG, 1989
(United States) David Rivers (Olympiacos); 26 points, 1997	(United States) Kevin Magee (Maccabi Tel Aviv); 29 points, 1989	(Socialist Federal Republic of Yugoslavia) Zoran Savić (Pop 84); 52 points / 26.0 PPG, 1991
(United States) Nate Huffman (Maccabi Tel Aviv); 26 points, 2000	(United States) David Rivers (Olympiacos); 28 points, 1997	(France) Nando De Colo (CSKA Moscow); 52 points / 26.0 PPG, 2016
(Federal Republic of Yugoslavia) Sasha Danilović (Partizan); 25 points, 1992	(Spain) Jordi Villacampa (Montigalà Joventut); 28 points, 1992	(United States) Dominique Wilkins (Panathinaikos); 51 points / 25.5 PPG, 1996
(Israel) Doron Jamchi (Maccabi Tel Aviv); 25 points, 1989	(Israel) Doron Jamchi (Maccabi Tel Aviv); 28 points, 1989	(Serbia) Vasilije Micić (Anadolu Efes); 50 points / 25.0 PPG, 2021
(United States) Bob McAdoo (Tracer Milano); 25 points, 1988	(Spain) Sergio Llull (Real Madrid); 28 points, 2017	(United States) Andrew Goudelock (Fenerbahçe); 50 points / 25.0 PPG, 2015
(Serbia) Vasilije Micić (Anadolu Efes); 25 points, 2021	(Greece) Nikos Galis (Aris); 28 points, 1988	(United States) Marcus Brown (CSKA Moscow); 50 points / 25.0 PPG, 2004

=== Rebounds ===
Rebounds (Single Final Four)
Most Rebounds in a Final	Most Rebounds in a Semifinal	Most Rebounds in a Final Four
(United States) Maceo Baston (Maccabi Tel Aviv); 15 rebounds, 2006	(United States) Darryl Dawkins (Olimpia Milano); 19 rebounds, 1992	(United States) Roy Tarpley (Olympiacos); 30 rebounds / 15.0 RPG, 1994

=== Assists ===
Assists (Single Final Four)
Most Assists in a Final	Most Assists in a Semifinal	Most Assists in a Final Four
(United States) Jeremy Pargo (Maccabi Tel Aviv); 9 Assists, 2011 (Greece) Dimitris Diamantidis (Panathinaikos); 9 Assists, 2011 (Spain) Sergio Rodríguez (Real Madrid); 9 Assists, 2023	(Croatia) Toni Kukoč (Benetton Treviso); 10 assists, 1993	(Greece) Nick Calathes (FC Barcelona); 22 Assists / 11.0 APG, 2022

== EuroLeague Final Four All-Time Top 10 Scorers (1988–2026) ==
Rank	Player	Points Scored	Games played	PPG
1.	(Greece) Nikos Galis	231	8	28.9
2.	(Spain) Sergio Llull	216	22	9.8
3.	(Spain) Sergio Rodríguez	209	18	11.6
4.	(Russia) J. R. Holden	194	16	12.1
5.	(Greece) Kostas Sloukas	193	21	9.2
6.	(France) Nando de Colo	185	11	16.8
7.	(United States) Trajan Langdon	172	12	14.3
8.	(Spain) Juan Carlos Navarro	168	13	12.9
9.	(Serbia) Dejan Bodiroga	164	8	20.5
10.	(Greece) Theo Papaloukas	164	18	9.1

== EuroLeague Final Four All-Time Top 10 Assisters (1988–2026) ==
Rank	Player	Assists	Games played	APG
1.	(Spain) Sergio Rodríguez	76	18	4.2
2.	(Spain) Sergio Llull	72	22	3.3
3.	(Greece) Kostas Sloukas	70	21	3.3
4.	(Greece) Theo Papaloukas	59	18	3.3
5.	(Greece) Nick Calathes	53	12	4.8
6.	(Greece) Dimitris Diamantidis	46	10	4.6
7.	(Lithuania) Šarūnas Jasikevičius	46	11	4.2
8.	(Serbia) Miloš Teodosić	46	15	3.1
9.	(Russia) J. R. Holden	45	16	2.8
10.	(Russia) Victor Khryapa	45	23	2.0

== EuroLeague Final Four All-Time Top 12 Total Rebounders (1988–2026) ==
Rank	Player	Total Rebounds	Games played	RPG
1.	(Russia) Victor Khryapa	107	23	4.7
2.	(United States) Kyle Hines	86	18	4.8
3.	(Slovenia) Matjaž Smodiš	73	14	5.2
4.	(Australia) David Andersen	70	12	5.8
5.	(Cape Verde) Edy Tavares	65	10	6.5
6.	(Czech Republic) Jan Veselý	64	14	4.6
7.	(Greece) Kostas Papanikolaou	60	16	3.8
8.	(Spain) Nikola Mirotić	59	12	4.9
9.	(United States) Mike Batiste	58	10	5.8
10.	(Greece) Ioannis Bourousis	53	10	5.3
11.	(United States) Maceo Baston	50	6	8.3
12.	(Spain) Rudy Fernández	50	18	2.7

== See also ==
- EuroLeague
- EuroLeague Final Four

== Works cited ==
- Final Four records
