= 1990–91 FIBA European Champions Cup =

- League: FIBA European Champions Cup
- Sport: Basketball

Regular Season

Final Four
- Champions: (Socialist Federal Republic of Yugoslavia) POP 84 (3rd title)
- Runners-up: (Spain) FC Barcelona Banca Catalana
- Final Four MVP: (Socialist Federal Republic of Yugoslavia) Toni Kukoč (POP 84)

FIBA European Champions Cup seasons
- ← 1989–90 1991–92 →

The 1990–91 FIBA European Champions Cup was the 34th season of the European top-tier level professional FIBA European Champions Cup (now called EuroLeague). It was won by POP 84, after they beat FC Barcelona Banca Catalana 70–65. It was their second championship triumph over the Spanish team, and their third straight championship overall. A feat previously achieved only by Rīgas ASK, who won the first three editions of the trophy. The culminating 1991 FIBA European Champions Cup Final Four was held at Palais Omnisports de Paris-Bercy, Bercy, Paris, on 16–18 April 1991. Toni Kukoč was named Final Four MVP for the second straight year.

This season of the competition also marked an end to the era of European national domestic league champions only participation, as the next season featured an expanded competition, that included national domestic league champions, the current league title holders, and some other teams from the most important national domestic leagues. That also was in accordance with the league being renamed for the next season, and being called the FIBA European League (or shortened to FIBA EuroLeague) championship for men's clubs. A name the competition would keep for the next five editions of the competition.

== Competition system ==
- 27 teams (European national domestic league champions only), playing in a tournament system, played knock-out rounds on a home and away basis. The aggregate score of both games decided the winner.
- The eight remaining teams after the knock-out rounds entered a 1/4 Final Group Stage, which was played as a round-robin. The final standing was based on individual wins and defeats. In the case of a tie between two or more teams after the group stage, the following criteria were used to decide the final classification: 1) number of wins in one-to-one games between the teams; 2) basket average between the teams; 3) general basket average within the group.
- The top four teams after the 1/4 Final Group Stage qualified for the Final Stage (Final Four), which was played at a predetermined venue.

== First round ==
Team 1	Agg.	Team 2	1st leg	2nd leg
Kingston (England)	156–141	(Netherlands) Commodore Den Helder	84–79	72–62
Steaua București (Romania)	99–195	(Soviet Union) CSKA Moscow	38–91	61–104
Benfica (Portugal)	159–195	(West Germany) Bayer 04 Leverkusen	87–85	74–110
Lech Poznań (Poland)	163–216	(Belgium) Maes Pils	86–109	77–107
ZTE Heraklith (Hungary)	206–167	(Austria) Klosterneuburg	107–76	99–91
KR (Iceland)	204–226	(Finland) Saab UU	120–118	84–108
Scania Södertälje (Sweden)	162–141	(Czechoslovakia) Zbrojovka Brno	94–82	68–59
Ideal Job Pully (Switzerland)	169–199	(Israel) Maccabi Elite Tel Aviv	95–92	74–107
Vllaznia (Albania)	193–248	(Turkey) Galatasaray	103–108	90–140
ENAD (Cyprus)	155–164	(Bulgaria) CSKA Sofia	66–70	89–94
AdW Berlin (East Germany)	180–190	(Luxembourg) Union Sportive Hiefenech	96–92	84–98

== Round of 16 ==
Team 1	Agg.	Team 2	1st leg	2nd leg
Kingston (England)	165-151	(Soviet Union) CSKA Moscow	93–77	72–74
Bayer 04 Leverkusen (West Germany)	188–182	(Belgium) Maes Pils	103–88	85–94
ZTE Heraklith (Hungary)	175–202	(Italy) Scavolini Pesaro	102–114	73–88
Saab UU (Finland)	183–256	(Greece) Aris	92–116	91–140
Scania Södertälje (Sweden)	168–180	(Israel) Maccabi Elite Tel Aviv	91–88	77–92
Galatasaray (Turkey)	156–198	(Socialist Federal Republic of Yugoslavia) POP 84	86–97	70–101
CSKA Sofia (Bulgaria)	189–224	(France) Limoges CSP	90–105	99–119
Union Sportive Hiefenech (Luxembourg)	150–230	(Spain) FC Barcelona Banca Catalana	73–113	77–117

== Quarterfinal round ==
Key to colors
Top four places in the group advance to Final four

	Team	Pld	Pts	W	L	PF	PA
1.	(Spain) FC Barcelona Banca Catalana	14	25	11	3	1276	1148
2.	(Socialist Federal Republic of Yugoslavia) POP 84	14	23	9	5	1208	1174
3.	(Italy) Scavolini Pesaro	14	22	8	6	1318	1290
4.	(Israel) Maccabi Elite Tel Aviv	14	22	8	6	1224	1163
5.	(Greece) Aris	14	21	7	7	1314	1324
6.	(Germany) Bayer 04 Leverkusen	14	20	6	8	1334	1392
7.	(England) Kingston	14	18	4	10	1141	1221
8.	(France) Limoges CSP	14	17	3	11	1251	1354

== Final four ==
=== Semifinals ===
April 16, Palais Omnisports de Paris-Bercy, Paris

Team 1	Score	Team 2
FC Barcelona Banca Catalana (Spain)	101–67	(Israel) Maccabi Elite Tel Aviv
POP 84 (Socialist Federal Republic of Yugoslavia)	93–87	(Italy) Scavolini Pesaro

=== 3rd place game ===
April 18, Palais Omnisports de Paris-Bercy, Paris

Team 1	Score	Team 2
Maccabi Elite Tel Aviv (Israel)	83–81	(Italy) Scavolini Pesaro

=== Final ===
April 18, Palais Omnisports de Paris-Bercy, Paris

Team 1	Score	Team 2
FC Barcelona Banca Catalana (Spain)	65–70	(Socialist Federal Republic of Yugoslavia) POP 84

1990–91 FIBA European Champions Cup
Champions

POP 84
3rd Title

=== Final standings ===
	Team
	(Socialist Federal Republic of Yugoslavia) POP 84
Silver medal	(Spain) FC Barcelona Banca Catalana
Bronze medal	(Israel) Maccabi Elite Tel Aviv
	(Italy) Scavolini Pesaro

== Awards ==
=== FIBA European Champions Cup Final Four MVP ===
- (Socialist Federal Republic of Yugoslavia) Toni Kukoč ( (Socialist Federal Republic of Yugoslavia) POP 84)

=== FIBA European Champions Cup Finals Top Scorer ===
- (Socialist Federal Republic of Yugoslavia) Zoran Savić ( (Socialist Federal Republic of Yugoslavia) POP 84)

=== FIBA European Champions Cup All-Final Four Team ===
Season	Position	Player	Club	Ref.
1991	PG	(Spain) José Antonio Montero	(Spain) FC Barcelona Banca Catalana	
1991	SG	(Socialist Federal Republic of Yugoslavia) Velimir Perasović	(Socialist Federal Republic of Yugoslavia) POP 84	
1991	SF	(Socialist Federal Republic of Yugoslavia) Toni Kukoč (MVP)	(Socialist Federal Republic of Yugoslavia) POP 84	
1991	PF	(Socialist Federal Republic of Yugoslavia) Zoran Savić	(Socialist Federal Republic of Yugoslavia) POP 84	
1991	C	(United States) Audie Norris	(Spain) FC Barcelona Banca Catalana	
