= 1996–97 FIBA EuroLeague =

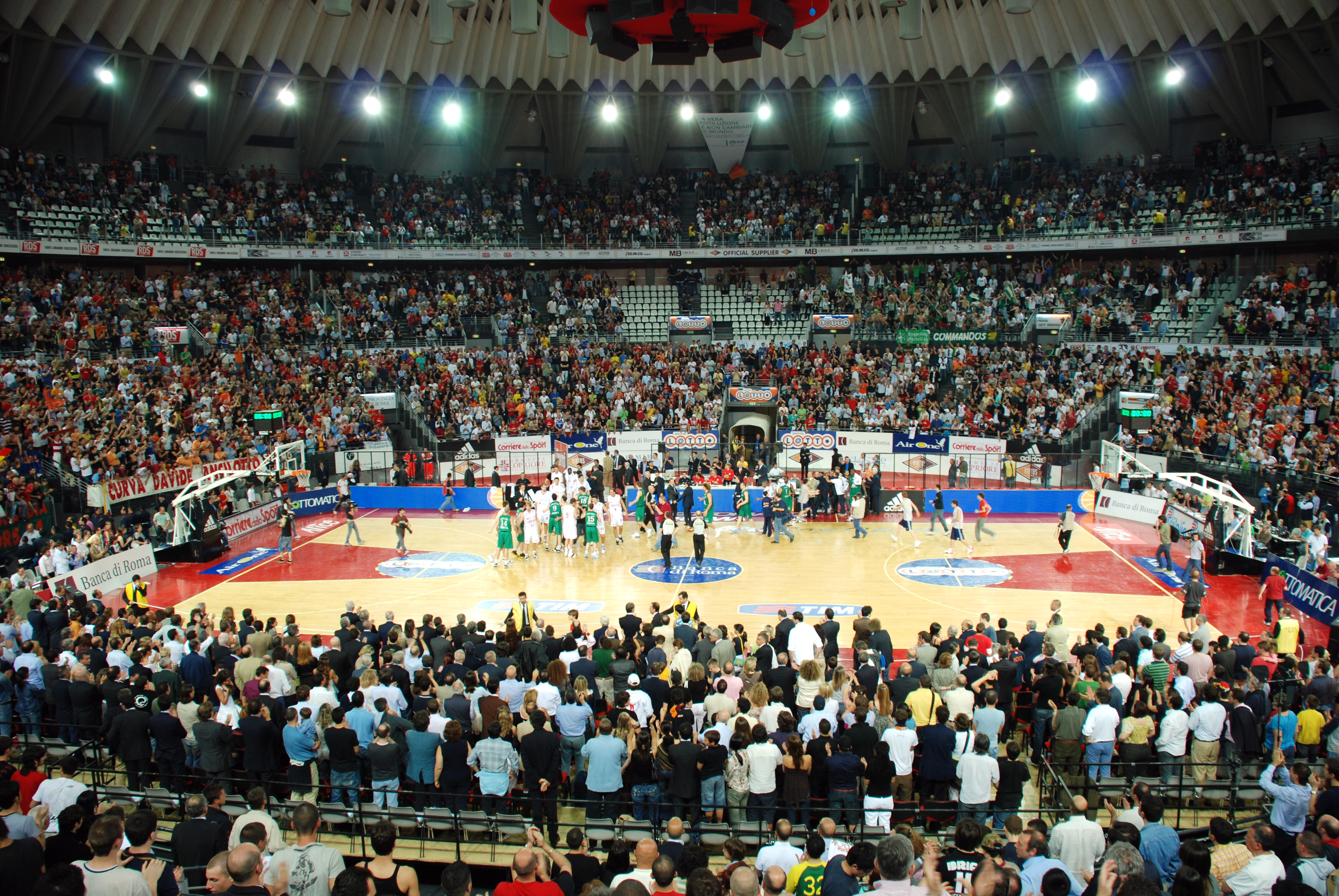
- The PalaEUR in Rome hosted the final Four
- Season: 1996–97
- Dates: September 18, 1996 – April 24, 1997
- Teams: 24

Finals
- Champions: (Greece) Olympiacos (1st title)
- Runners-up: (Spain) FC Barcelona Banca Catalana
- Third place: (Slovenia) Smelt Olimpija
- Fourth place: (France) ASVEL
- Final Four MVP: (United States) David Rivers

Statistical leaders
Points	(Italy) Carlton Myers	22.9
Rebounds	(United States) Warren Kidd	10.6
Assists	(United States) Michael Anderson	6.1

The 1996–97 FIBA EuroLeague was the 40th installment of the European top-tier level professional club competition for basketball clubs (now called simply EuroLeague). It was organized by FIBA Europe. It began on September 19, 1996, and ended on April 24, 1997. The competition's Final Four was held at Rome.

In the previous 5 seasons of the competition, the competition's official name was FIBA European League, or shortened to FIBA EuroLeague. This season was the first edition of the competition that took the shortened name of FIBA EuroLeague, as the league's official name.

== Competition system ==
- 24 teams (the national domestic league champions from the best leagues, and a variable number of other clubs from the most important national domestic leagues). The competition culminated in a Final Four.

== Country ranking ==
For the 1996–1997 EuroLeague, the countries are allocated places according to their place on the FIBA country rankings, which takes into account their performance in European competitions from 1993–94 to 1995–96.

Country ranking for 1996–1997 FIBA EuroLeague

Rank	Country	Points	Teams	Notes
1	Spain	321.667	3	
2	Greece	299.667	3	
3	Italy	216.667	3	
4	France	123.238	3	
5	Turkey	93.333	2	
6	Russia	66	2	
7	Croatia	63	2	
8	Germany	61.389	2	
9	Israel	50.905	1	
10	Slovenia	41.333	1	
11	Belgium	29	1	
12	FR Yugoslavia	26	1	
13	Portugal	24.5	0	
14	Lithuania	19	0	
15	Ukraine	15.389	0	
16	Poland	12.111	0	
17	Macedonia	11.778	0	
18	Hungary	10.5	0	
19	Slovakia	8.889	0	

Rank	Country	Points	Teams	Notes
20	Czech Republic	8.389	0	
21	Austria	6.556	0	
22	Switzerland	6.056	0	
23	England	5.389	0	
24	Cyprus	5	0	
25	Sweden	4.722	0	
26	Bulgaria	4	0	
27	Latvia	3.667	0	
28	Romania	2.778	0	
29	Bosnia and Herzegovina	2.5	0	
30	Luxembourg	2.167	0	
31	Netherlands	1.944	0	
32	Georgia	1.833	0	
33	Finland	1.667	0	
34	Estonia	1.5	0	
35	Albania	1.444	0	
36	Iceland	0.889	0	
37	Belarus	0.278	0	
38	Denmark	0.167	0	

== Team allocation ==
The labels in the parentheses show how each team qualified for the place of its starting round:

- 1st, 2nd, 3rd, etc.: League position after Playoffs

Regular season
(Spain) FC Barcelona Banca Catalana (1st)	(Italy) Stefanel Milano (1st)	(Turkey) Efes Pilsen (1st)	(Germany) Bayer 04 Leverkusen (1st)
(Spain) Caja San Fernando (2nd)	(Italy) Teamsystem Bologna (2nd)	(Turkey) Ülker (2nd)	(Germany) Alba Berlin (2nd)
(Spain) Estudiantes Argentaria (3rd)	(Italy) Kinder Bologna (3rd)	(Russia) CSKA Moscow (1st)	(Israel) Maccabi Elite Tel Aviv (1st)
(Greece) Olympiacos (1st)	(France) Pau-Orthez (1st)	(Russia) Dynamo Moscow (2nd)	(Slovenia) Smelt Olimpija (1st)
(Greece) Panathinaïkos (2nd)	(France) ASVEL (2nd)	(Croatia) Cibona (1st)	(Belgium) Spirou Charleroi (1st)
(Greece) Panionios Ethniki Asfalistiki (3rd)	(France) Limoges CSP (3rd)	Croatia Osiguranje Split (2nd)	(Federal Republic of Yugoslavia) Partizan Inex (1st)

== Preliminary round ==
=== Group A ===
Pos	Team	Pld	W	L	PF	PA	PD	Pts	Qualification	MIL	CSK	MAC	ÜLK	LIM	PAN
1	(Italy) Stefanel Milano	10	7	3	775	727	+48	17	Advance to Group E	—	87–74	85–88	67–65	79–66	90–66
2	(Russia) CSKA Moscow	10	6	4	761	734	+27	16	Advance to Group E	70–55	—	89–80	71–76	74–65	96–66
3	(Israel) Maccabi Elite Tel Aviv	10	6	4	755	734	+21	16	Advance to Group E	78–68	77–78	—	71–65	69–77	69–57
4	(Turkey) Ülker	10	4	6	767	766	+1	14	Advance to Group F	67–73	73–76	84–80	—	99–91	87–69
5	(France) Limoges CSP	10	4	6	757	788	−31	14	Advance to Group F	74–85	83–66	62–69	84–80	—	78–75
6	(Greece) Panionios Ethniki Asfalistiki	10	3	7	729	795	−66	13	Advance to Group F	79–86	72–67	69–74	84–71	92–77	—

Source: FIBA Europe
Legend: Blue = home team win; Red = away team win.

=== Group B ===
Pos	Team	Pld	W	L	PF	PA	PD	Pts	Qualification	TSB	EST	CIB	ALB	OLY	SPI
1	(Italy) Teamsystem Bologna	10	7	3	773	742	+31	17	Advance to Group F	—	100–86	54–66	82–72	81–72	87–78
2	(Spain) Estudiantes Argentaria	10	6	4	798	821	−23	16	Advance to Group F	66–75	—	78–71	82–75	87–78	94–72
3	(Croatia) Cibona	10	6	4	713	679	+34	16	Advance to Group F	64–72	81–66	—	78–68	63–61	75–66
4	(Germany) Alba Berlin	10	6	4	755	723	+32	16	Advance to Group E	81–64	78–79	79–71	—	62–61	94–73
5	(Greece) Olympiacos	10	5	5	770	711	+59	15	Advance to Group E	96–80	110–78	62–61	64–67	—	87–60
6	(Belgium) Spirou Charleroi	10	0	10	699	832	−133	10	Advance to Group E	61–78	75–82	73–77	69–79	78–79	—

Source: FIBA Europe
Legend: Blue = home team win; Red = away team win.

=== Group C ===
Pos	Team	Pld	W	L	PF	PA	PD	Pts	Qualification	PAO	OLI	ASV	FCB	CRO	BAY
1	(Greece) Panathinaïkos	10	8	2	736	693	+43	18	Advance to Group G	—	75–67	66–72	79–75	72–50	87–79
2	(Slovenia) Smelt Olimpija	10	7	3	753	669	+84	17	Advance to Group G	74–76	—	73–60	77–65	81–53	86–70
3	(France) ASVEL	10	7	3	738	718	+20	17	Advance to Group G	74–80	70–69	—	91–90	78–59	72–64
4	(Spain) FC Barcelona Banca Catalana	10	4	6	767	734	+33	14	Advance to Group H	77–58	70–71	78–81	—	68–70	90–71
5	Croatia Osiguranje	10	4	6	630	705	−75	14	Advance to Group H	58–65	53–66	73–61	65–75	—	86–79
6	(Germany) Bayer 04 Leverkusen	10	0	10	704	809	−105	10	Advance to Group H	67–78	77–89	66–79	71–79	60–63	—

Source: FIBA Europe
Legend: Blue = home team win; Red = away team win.

=== Group D ===
Pos	Team	Pld	W	L	PF	PA	PD	Pts	Qualification	EFE	PAR	KIN	PAU	CSF	DYN
1	(Turkey) Efes Pilsen	10	8	2	736	693	+43	18	Advance to Group H	—	93–77	75–60	78–76	69–66	87–84
2	(Federal Republic of Yugoslavia) Partizan Inex	10	6	4	753	669	+84	16	Advance to Group H	76–72	—	78–70	84–75	66–72	97–64
3	(Italy) Kinder Bologna	10	5	5	738	718	+20	15	Advance to Group H	75–89	100–83	—	86–74	93–75	89–74
4	(France) Pau-Orthez	10	5	5	767	734	+33	15	Advance to Group G	80–78	73–77	89–83	—	85–79	94–71
5	(Spain) Caja San Fernando	10	4	6	630	705	−75	14	Advance to Group G	68–70	72–67	72–64	61–69	—	91–61
6	(Russia) Dynamo Moscow	10	2	8	704	809	−105	12	Advance to Group G	73–82	71–72	64–78	70–65	79–75	—

Source: FIBA Europe
Legend: Blue = home team win; Red = away team win.

== Qualification round ==
(The individual scores and standings of the First stage are accumulated in the Qualification round)

If one or more clubs are level on won-lost record, tiebreakers are applied in the following order:

1. Head-to-head record in matches between the tied clubs
2. Overall point difference in games between the tied clubs
3. Overall point difference in all group matches (first tiebreaker if tied clubs are not in the same group)
4. Points scored in all group matches
5. Sum of quotients of points scored and points allowed in each group match

=== Group E ===
Pos	Team	Pld	W	L	PF	PA	PD	Pts	Qualification	MIL	ALB	OLY	MAC	CSK	SPI
1	(Italy) Stefanel Milano	16	11	5	1234	1175	+59	27	Advance to Play Offs	—	80–91	73–71			73–63
2	(Germany) Alba Berlin	16	10	6	1193	1167	+26	26	Advance to Play Offs	68–78	—		70–65	78–76	
3	(Greece) Olympiacos	16	9	7	1236	1131	+105	25	Advance to Play Offs	87–84		—	69–60	82–51	
4	(Israel) Maccabi Elite Tel Aviv	16	9	7	1209	1173	+36	25	Advance to Play Offs		78–62	82–78	—		87–70
5	(Russia) CSKA Moscow	16	8	8	1177	1175	+2	24			67–69	70–79		—	80–66
6	(Belgium) Spirou Charleroi	16	1	15	1123	1297	−174	17		68–71			90–82	67–72	—

Source: FIBA Europe
Legend: Blue = home team win; Red = away team win.

=== Group F ===
Pos	Team	Pld	W	L	PF	PA	PD	Pts	Qualification	TSB	CIB	EST	LIM	ÜLK	PAN
1	(Italy) Teamsystem Bologna	16	12	4	1262	1163	+99	28	Advance to Play Offs	—			90–76	69–61	94–58
2	(Croatia) Cibona	16	10	6	1166	1126	+40	26	Advance to Play Offs		—		72–66	82–81	85–58
3	(Spain) Estudiantes Argentaria	16	9	7	1309	1284	+25	25	Advance to Play Offs			—	68–70	97–63	92–70
4	(France) Limoges CSP	16	8	8	1226	1234	−8	24	Advance to Play Offs	81–70	85–61	91–85	—		
5	(Turkey) Ülker	16	5	11	1196	1243	−47	21		73–78	73–77	78–74		—	
6	(Greece) Panionios Ethniki Asfalistiki	16	4	12	1162	1325	−163	20		72–88	84–76	91–95			—

Source: FIBA Europe
Legend: Blue = home team win; Red = away team win.

=== Group G ===
Pos	Team	Pld	W	L	PF	PA	PD	Pts	Qualification	PAO	ASV	OLI	CSF	PAU	DYN
1	(Greece) Panathinaikos	16	13	3	1218	1134	+84	29	Advance to Play Offs	—			90–71	75–71	71–67
2	(France) ASVEL	16	12	4	1225	1188	+37	28	Advance to Play Offs		—		83–81	67–65	82–52
3	(Slovenia) Smelt Olimpija	16	10	6	1219	1119	+100	26	Advance to Play Offs			—	67–70	96–86	80–72
4	(Spain) Caja San Fernando	16	7	9	1203	1194	+9	23	Advance to Play Offs	78–87	91–68	81–76	—		
5	(France) Pau-Orthez	16	6	10	1240	1251	−11	22		66–78	95–97	77–71		—	
6	(Russia) Dynamo Moscow	16	3	13	1140	1310	−170	19		88–81	86–90	64–76			—

Source: FIBA Europe
Legend: Blue = home team win; Red = away team win.

=== Group H ===
Pos	Team	Pld	W	L	PF	PA	PD	Pts	Qualification	EFE	PAR	FCB	KIN	CRO	BAY
1	(Turkey) Efes Pilsen	16	12	4	1250	1156	+94	28	Advance to Play Offs	—		96–70		74–64	91–68
2	(Federal Republic of Yugoslavia) Partizan Inex	16	9	7	1257	1228	+29	25	Advance to Play Offs		—	91–87		71–82	89–76
3	(Spain) FC Barcelona Banca Catalana	16	8	8	1244	1225	+19	24	Advance to Play Offs	69–67	75–73	—	73–72		
4	(Italy) Kinder Bologna	16	7	9	1274	1259	+15	23	Advance to Play Offs			92–103	—	73–57	90–100
5	Croatia Osiguranje	16	7	9	1055	1124	−69	23		78–56	76–75		68–70	—	
6	(Germany) Bayer 04 Leverkusen	16	2	14	1175	1312	−137	18		72–73	70–81		85–79		—

Source: FIBA Europe
Legend: Blue = home team win; Red = away team win.

== Playoffs ==
=== Bracket ===
Teams in bold advanced to the next round. The numbers to the left of each team indicate the team's seeding, the numbers to the right indicate the result of games including result in bold of the team that won in that game, and the numbers furthest to the right indicate the number of games the team won in that round.

Eight-Finals
**E1**	**(Italian Basketball Federation) Stefanel Milano**	**67**	76	**78**	**2**
H4	(Italian Basketball Federation) Kinder Bologna	59	**83**	76	1
F2	(Croatian Basketball Federation) Cibona	**61**	66	61	1
**G3**	**(Basketball Federation of Slovenia) Smelt Olimpija**	58	**69**	**62**	**2**
**G1**	**(Hellenic Basketball Federation) Panathinaikos**	**68**	**70**	**2**
F4	(French Federation of Basketball) Limoges CSP	67	55	0
H2	(FR Yugoslavia) Partizan Inex	71	**61**	69	1
**E3**	**(Hellenic Basketball Federation) Olympiacos**	**81**	60	**74**	**2**
**F1**	**(Italian Basketball Federation) Teamsystem Bologna**	**73**	**79**	**2**
G4	(Spanish Basketball Federation) Caja San Fernando	70	75	0
E2	(German Basketball Federation) Alba Berlin	77	62	0
**H3**	**(Spanish Basketball Federation) FCB Banca Catalana**	**95**	**72**	**2**
**H1**	**(Turkish Basketball Federation) Efes Pilsen**	**76**	65	**84**	**2**
E4	(Israeli Basketball Association) Maccabi Elite Tel Aviv	67	**78**	69	1
**G2**	**(French Federation of Basketball) ASVEL**	**97**	77	**75**	**2**
F3	(Spanish Basketball Federation) Estudiantes Argentaria	74	**79**	71	1

Quarter-Finals
(Italian Basketball Federation) Stefanel Milano	**94**	69	61	1
**(Basketball Federation of Slovenia) Smelt Olimpija**	90	**73**	**77**	**2**
(Hellenic Basketball Federation) Panathinaikos	49	57	0
**(Hellenic Basketball Federation) Olympiacos**	**69**	**65**	**2**
(Italian Basketball Federation) Teamsystem Bologna	**70**	73	62	1
**(Spanish Basketball Federation) FCB Banca Catalana**	65	**75**	**87**	**2**
(Turkish Basketball Federation) Efes Pilsen	**87**	70	57	1
**(French Federation of Basketball) ASVEL**	71	**80**	**62**	**2**

Semi-Finals
(Basketball Federation of Slovenia) Smelt Olimpija	65
**(Hellenic Basketball Federation) Olympiacos**	**74**
**(Spanish Basketball Federation) FCB Banca Catalana**	**77**
(French Federation of Basketball) ASVEL	70

Final
**(Hellenic Basketball Federation) Olympiacos**	**73**
(Spanish Basketball Federation) FCB Banca Catalana	58
Third Place
**(Basketball Federation of Slovenia) Smelt Olimpija**	**86**
(French Federation of Basketball) ASVEL	79

=== Eight-Final ===
Team 1	Agg.	Team 2	1st leg	2nd leg	3rd leg
Cibona (Croatia)	1–2	(Slovenia) Smelt Olimpija	61–58	66–69	61–62
Stefanel Milano (Italy)	2–1	(Italy) Kinder Bologna	67–59	76–83	78–76
Partizan (Federal Republic of Yugoslavia)	1–2	(Greece) Olympiacos	71–81	61–60	69–74
Panathinaikos (Greece)	2–0	(France) Limoges CSP	68–67	70–55	
Alba Berlin (Germany)	0–2	(Spain) FC Barcelona Banca Catalana	77–95	62–72	
Teamsystem Bologna (Italy)	2–0	(Spain) Caja San Fernando	73–70	79–75	
ASVEL (France)	2–1	(Spain) Estudiantes Argentaria	97–74	77–79	75–71
Efes Pilsen (Turkey)	2–1	(Israel) Maccabi Elite Tel Aviv	76–67	65–78	84–69

=== Quarter-Final ===
Team 1	Agg.	Team 2	1st leg	2nd leg	3rd leg
Stefanel Milano (Italy)	1–2	(Slovenia) Smelt Olimpija	94–90	69–73	61–77
Teamsystem Bologna (Italy)	1–2	(Spain) FC Barcelona Banca Catalana	70–65	73–75	62–87
Efes Pilsen (Turkey)	1–2	(France) ASVEL	87–71	70–80	57–62
Panathinaikos (Greece)	0–2	(Greece) Olympiacos	49–69	57–65	

== Final four ==
=== Semifinals ===
April 22, Palaeur, Rome

Team 1	Score	Team 2
Smelt Olimpija (Slovenia)	65–74	(Greece) Olympiacos
FC Barcelona Banca Catalana (Spain)	77–70	(France) ASVEL

=== 3rd place game ===
April 24, Palaeur, Rome

Team 1	Score	Team 2
Smelt Olimpija (Slovenia)	86–79	(France) ASVEL

=== Final ===
April 24, Palaeur, Rome

Team 1	Score	Team 2
Olympiacos (Greece)	73–58	(Spain) FC Barcelona Banca Catalana

1996–97 FIBA EuroLeague Champions

Olympiacos
1st Title

=== Final standings ===
	Team
	(Greece) Olympiacos
2nd place, silver medalist(s)	(Spain) FC Barcelona Banca Catalana
3rd place, bronze medalist(s)	(Slovenia) Smelt Olimpija
	(France) ASVEL

== Awards ==
All official awards of the 1996–97 FIBA EuroLeague.

=== FIBA EuroLeague Final Four MVP ===
- (United States) David Rivers ( (Greece) Olympiacos)

=== FIBA EuroLeague All-Final Four Team ===
First Team
(United States) David Rivers (MVP)	(Greece) Olympiacos
(Greece) Dimitrios Papanikolaou	(Greece) Olympiacos
(United States) Brian Howard	(France) ASVEL
(Spain) Andrés Jiménez	(Spain) FC Barcelona Banca Catalana
(Federal Republic of Yugoslavia) Dragan Tarlać	(Greece) Olympiacos

=== FIBA EuroLeague Top Scorer ===
- (Italy) Carlton Myers ( (Italy) Fortitudo Bologna)

== Statistics ==
=== Individual statistics ===
==== Points ====
Rank	Name	Team	Games	Points	PPG
1.	(Italy) Carlton Myers	(Italy) Teamsystem Bologna	19	436	22.9
2.	(Croatia) Arijan Komazec	(Italy) Kinder Bologna	16	351	21.9
3.	(North Macedonia) Petar Naumoski	(Turkey) Efes Pilsen	22	453	20.6

Source: FIBAEurope

==== Rebounds ====
Rank	Name	Team	Games	Rebounds	RPG
1.	(United States) Warren Kidd	(Italy) Stefanel Milano	22	233	10.6
2.	(Russia) Vitaly Nosov	(Russia) Dynamo Moscow	16	162	10.1
3.	(Germany) Hansi Gnad	(Germany) Bayer 04 Leverkusen	16	147	9.2

Source: FIBAEurope

==== Assists ====
Rank	Name	Team	Games	Assists	APG
1.	(United States) Michael Anderson	(Spain) Caja San Fernando	17	104	6.1
2.	(United States) Delaney Rudd	(France) ASVEL	24	138	5.8
3.	(North Macedonia) Petar Naumoski	(Turkey) Efes Pilsen	22	98	5.8

Source: FIBAEurope

==== Other statistics ====
Category	Player	Team	Games	Average
Steals	(United States) Michael Anderson	(Spain) Caja San Fernando	17	2.7
Turnovers	(United States) Michael Anderson	(Spain) Caja San Fernando	17	4.6
Minutes	(North Macedonia) Petar Naumoski	(Turkey) Efes Pilsen	22	39.0
FT %	(Croatia) Slaven Rimac	(Croatia) Cibona	19	93.3%
2-Point %	(Croatia) Arijan Komazec	(Italy) Kinder Bologna	16	67.1%
3-Point %	(Federal Republic of Yugoslavia) Miroslav Berić	(Federal Republic of Yugoslavia) Partizan	19	47.9%

=== Individual game highs ===
Category	Player	Team	Statistic	Opponent
Points	(United States) Tony Dawson	(Germany) Bayer 04 Leverkusen	43	(Italy) Kinder Bologna (Jan 15, 1997)
Rebounds	(United States) Warren Kidd	(Italy) Stefanel Milano	21	(Greece) Olympiacos (Jan 16, 1997)
Assists	(United States) Delaney Rudd	(France) ASVEL	12	(Germany) Bayer 04 Leverkusen (Nov 7, 1996)
Assists	(United States) Michael Anderson	(Spain) Caja San Fernando	12	(Russia) Dynamo Moscow (Oct 10, 1996)
Assists	(United States) Michael Anderson	(Spain) Caja San Fernando	12	(France) ASVEL (Feb 19, 1997)
Steals	(France) Jimmy Nebot	(France) ASVEL	11	(Turkey) Efes Pilsen (Apr 3, 1997)

=== Team statistics ===
Category	Team	Average
Points	(Spain) Estudiantes Argentaria	80.7
Rebounds	(Greece) Olympiacos	32.3
Assists	(France) Pau-Orthez	16.6
Steals	(Spain) Estudiantes Argentaria	11.2
Turnovers	(Russia) Dynamo Moscow	16.9
FT %	(Israel) Maccabi Elite Tel Aviv	76.9%
2-Point %	(France) Pau-Orthez	58.6%
3-Point %	(France) Pau-Orthez	40.9%

== See also ==
- 1996–97 FIBA EuroCup
- 1996–97 FIBA Korać Cup
