= Vasily Karasev =

Russian basketball player and coach

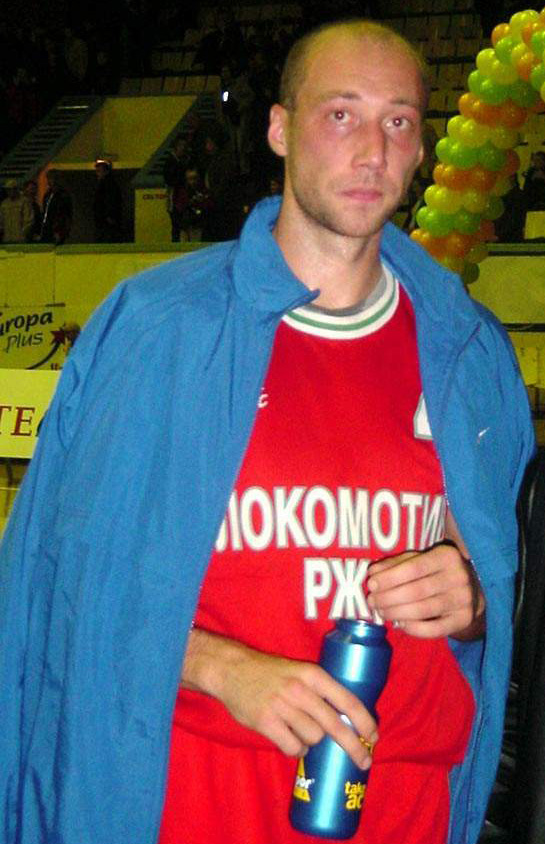
- image of Vasily Karasev

Personal information
- Born: April 14, 1971 (age 55) Leningrad, USSR
- Listed height: 193 cm (6 ft 4 in)
- Listed weight: 93 kg (205 lb)

Career information
- Playing career: 1990–2009
- Position: Point guard / shooting guard
- Coaching career: 2010–2018

Career history

Playing
- 1990–1992: Spartak St. Petersburg
- 1992–1996: CSKA Moscow
- 1996–1997: Efes Pilsen
- 1997–1998: Alba Berlin
- 1998–2000: CSKA Moscow
- 2000–2001: Iraklis Thessaloniki
- 2001–2002: Ural Great Perm
- 2002–2003: Lokomotiv Mineralnye Vody
- 2003–2005: Khimki
- 2005–2006: Ural Great Perm
- 2006–2008: Universitet Yugra Surgut
- 2008–2009: Triumph Lyubertsy

Coaching
- 2010, 2014: Russia Under-20
- 2010–2012: Triumph Lyubertsy (assistant)
- 2012–2018: Triumph Lyubertsy / Zenit
- 2013: Russia

Career highlights
- As player: 3× FIBA EuroStar (1997–1999); As head coach: VTB United League Coach of the Year (2016)
Medals
Men's basketball
Representing Russia
FIBA World Cup
| Silver medal – second place | 1994 Canada |
| Silver medal – second place | 1998 Greece |
EuroBasket
| Silver medal – second place | 1993 Germany |
| Bronze medal – third place | 1997 Spain |
Representing Soviet Union
European U-18 Championship
| Silver medal – second place | 1990 Netherlands | U-18 Team |

Vasily Nikolayevich Karasev (Russian: Василий Николаевич Карасев; born April 14, 1971) is a Russian former professional basketball player and coach.

== Professional career ==
For several years, Karasev was the starting point guard of the Russian League club CSKA Moscow, in the EuroLeague. He also led CSKA to the 1996 EuroLeague Final Four, where he was named to the EuroLeague All-Final Four Team. He was selected to the FIBA EuroStars team in the years 1997, 1998, and 1999. He is widely considered to have been one of the best European point guards of the 1990s.

== National team career ==
Karasev was the starting point guard of the senior men's Russian national basketball team, between 1993 and 2003. With Russia's senior national team, Karasev won two EuroBasket medals, the silver medal at the EuroBasket 1993 and the bronze medal at the EuroBasket 1997. He also won two FIBA World Cup silver medals, one at the 1994 FIBA World Championship, and one at the 1998 FIBA World Championship.

At the 1998 FIBA World Championship, he was selected to the All-Tournament Team.

== Coaching career ==
After he retired from playing professional basketball, Karasev began working as a basketball coach. He became the head coach of Triumph Lyubertsy (later renamed Zenit St. Petersburg), in 2012.

== Personal life ==
Vasily is the father of Sergey Karasev, a senior Russian national basketball team player, who has played with the pro clubs Triumph Lyubertsy, Canton Charge, Cleveland Cavaliers and Brooklyn Nets (NBA), and Zenit Saint Petersburg.
