= 1996 FIBA European League Final Four =

Club basketball tournament in Paris

Tournament details
- Arena: Palais Omnisports de Paris-Bercy; Paris, France
- Dates: April 1996

Final positions
- Champions: (Greece) Panathinaikos (1st title)
- Runners-up: (Spain) FC Barcelona Banca Catalana
- Third place: (Russia) CSKA Moscow
- Fourth place: (Spain) Real Madrid Teka

Awards and statistics
- MVP: (United States) Dominique Wilkins

The 1996 FIBA European League Final Four, or 1996 FIBA EuroLeague Final Four, was the 1995–96 season's FIBA European League Final Four tournament, organized by FIBA Europe. Panathinaikos won its first title, after defeating Barcelona in the final game.

== Bracket ==
Semi-finals
(Russia) CSKA Moscow	71
(Greece) Panathinaikos	81
(Spain) FCB Banca Catalana	76
(Spain) Real Madrid Teka	66

Final
(Greece) Panathinaikos	67
(Spain) FCB Banca Catalana	66
Third place
(Russia) CSKA Moscow	74
(Spain) Real Madrid Teka	73

== Semifinals ==
=== CSKA Moscow – Panathinaikos ===
9 April 1996
19:00

Boxscore

CSKA Moscow (Russia)	71–81	(Greece) Panathinaikos
Scoring by half: 33–36, 38–45
Pts: Karasev 23; Rebs: Nwosu 13; Asts: Karasev 9		Pts: Wilkins 35; Rebs: Vranković 12; Asts: Oikonomou 5

Palais Omnisports de Paris-Bercy, Paris
Attendance: 12,500
Referees: Iztok Rems (SLO), Pascal Dorizon (FRA)

=== FC Barcelona Banca Catalana – Real Madrid Teka ===
9 April 1996
21:00

Boxscore

FC Barcelona Banca Catalana (Spain)	76–66	(Spain) Real Madrid Teka
Scoring by half: 34–38, 42–28
Pts: Karnišovas 24; Rebs: Godfread 7 Asts: Karnišovas 6		Pts: Arlauckas 22; Rebs: Smith 6 Asts: Santos 5

Palais Omnisports de Paris-Bercy, Paris
Attendance: 11,000
Referees: Reuven Virovnik (ISR), José Araujo (POR)

== Third place game ==
11 April 1996
19:00

Boxscore

CSKA Moscow (Russia)	74–73	(Spain) Real Madrid Teka
Scoring by half: 34–35, 40–38
Pts: Vētra 22; Rebs: Panov 8 Asts: Karasev 8		Pts: Savić 22; Rebs: Savić 9 Asts: Antúnez 7

Palais Omnisports Paris-Bercy, Paris
Attendance: 10,500
Referees: Iztok Rems (SLO), José Araujo (POR)

== Final ==
11 April 1996
21:00

Boxscore

Panathinaikos (Greece)	67–66	(Spain) FC Barcelona Banca Catalana
Scoring by half: 35–25, 32–41
Pts: Alvertis 17; Rebs: Wilkins 10; Asts: Oikonomou 5		Pts: Karnišovas 23; Rebs: Karnišovas 8 Asts: Karnišovas 6

Palais Omnisports Paris-Bercy, Paris
Attendance: 12,500
Referees: Reuven Virovnik (ISR), Pascal Dorizon (FRA)

Panathinaikos	FC Barcelona Banca Catalana

Starters:			P	R	A
PG	10	(Greece) Panagiotis Giannakis (C)	9	2	4
SG	4	(Greece) Fragiskos Alvertis	17	3	2
SF	12	(United States) Dominique Wilkins	16	10	1
PF	8	(Greece) Nikos Oikonomou	10	6	5
C	11	(Croatia) Stojko Vranković	0	9	1
Reserves:			P	R	A
SG	6	(Greece) Vangelis Vourtzoumis	2	0	1
PG	9	(Greece) Jon Korfas	4	0	0
PF	15	(Greece) Tzanis Stavrakopoulos	9	3	0
Head coach:
(Federal Republic of Yugoslavia) Božidar Maljković

1995–96 FIBA European League
Champions

Panathinaikos
First title

Starters:			P	R	A
PG	5	(Spain) José Luis Galilea	10	1	5
SG	9	(Spain) Xavi Fernández	15	3	0
SF	14	(Lithuania) Artūras Karnišovas	23	8	6
PF	4	(Spain) Andrés Jiménez (C)	9	2	1
C	6	(United States) Dan Godfread	9	5	1
Reserves:			P	R	A
SF	10	(Spain) José Antonio Montero	0	0	2
PG	11	(Spain) Salva Díez	0	1	2
PF	12	(Spain) Manel Bosch	0	2	1
C	13	(Spain) Ferran Martínez	0	2	0
Head coach:
(Spain) Aíto García Reneses

=== Final standings ===
	Team
1.	(Greece) Panathinaikos
2.	(Spain) FC Barcelona Banca Catalana
3.	(Russia) CSKA Moscow
4.	(Spain) Real Madrid Teka

== Awards ==
=== FIBA European League Final Four MVP ===
- (United States) Dominique Wilkins ( (Greece) Panathinaikos)

=== FIBA European League Finals Top Scorer ===
- (Lithuania) Artūras Karnišovas ( (Spain) FC Barcelona Banca Catalana)

=== FIBA European League All-Final Four Team ===
FIBA European League All-Final Four Team
Player	Team	Ref.
(Russia) Vasily Karasev	CSKA Moscow	
(Greece) Fragiskos Alvertis	Panathinaikos	
(Lithuania) Artūras Karnišovas	FC Barcelona Banca Catalana	
(United States) Dominique Wilkins (MVP)	Panathinaikos	
(Croatia) Stojko Vranković	Panathinaikos	
