= 1997 FIBA EuroLeague Final Four =

International basketball tournament

Tournament details
- Arena: Palaeur; Rome, Italy
- Dates: April 1997

Final positions
- Champions: (Greece) Olympiacos (1st title)
- Runners-up: (Spain) FC Barcelona Banca Catalana
- Third place: (Slovenia) Smelt Olimpija
- Fourth place: (France) ASVEL

Awards and statistics
- MVP: (United States) David Rivers

The 1997 FIBA EuroLeague Final Four was the 1996–97 season's FIBA EuroLeague Final Four tournament, organized by FIBA Europe.

Olympiacos won its first title, after defeating FC Barcelona Banca Catalana.

== Bracket ==
Semi-finals
(Slovenia) Smelt Olimpija	65
(Greece) Olympiacos	74
(Spain) FCB Banca Catalana	77
(France) ASVEL	70

Final
(Greece) Olympiacos	73
(Spain) FCB Banca Catalana	58
Third place
(Slovenia) Smelt Olimpija	86
(France) ASVEL	79

== Semifinals ==
=== Smelt Olimpija – Olympiacos ===
April 22
18:30

Boxscore

Smelt Olimpija (Slovenia)	65–74	(Greece) Olympiacos
Scoring by half: 32–37, 33–37
Pts: Stepania 12; Rebs: Stepania 10; Asts: four players 2		Pts: Rivers 28; Rebs: Tarlać 13; Asts: Rivers, Sigalas 4

Palaeur, Rome
Attendance: 11,700
Referees: Carl Jungebrand (FIN), Gennaro Colucci (ITA)

=== FC Barcelona Banca Catalana – ASVEL ===
April 22
20:30

Boxscore

FC Barcelona Banca Catalana (Spain)	77–70	(France) ASVEL
Scoring by half: 38–36, 39–34
Pts: Djordjević 17; Rebs: Rivas 12; Asts: Djordjević 5		Pts: Howard, Rudd 20; Rebs: Howard 6 Asts: Rudd 6

Palaeur, Rome
Attendance: 11,700
Referees: Mikhail Davydov (RUS), Romualdas Brazauskas (LTU)

== Third-place game ==
April 24
18:30

Boxscore

Smelt Olimpija (Slovenia)	86–79	(France) ASVEL
Scoring by half: 54–35, 32–44
Pts: Milič 17; Rebs: Jurković 8 Asts: McDonald 5		Pts: Digbeu 22; Rebs: Howard, Nebot 6 Asts: Rudd 5

Palaeur, Rome
Attendance: 12,500
Referees: Gennaro Colucci (ITA), Mikhail Davydov (RUS)

== Final ==
April 24
20:30

Boxscore

Olympiacos (Greece)	73–58	(Spain) FC Barcelona Banca Catalana
Scoring by half: 31–29, 42–29
Pts: Rivers 26; Rebs: Tarlać 14; Asts: Rivers 3		Pts: Jiménez 16; Rebs: Jiménez 9 Asts: Djordjević 7

Palaeur, Rome
Attendance: 12,500
Referees: Carl Jungebrand (FIN), Romualdas Brazauskas (LTU)

Olympiacos	FC Barcelona Banca Catalana

Starters:			P	R	A
PG	15	(United States) David Rivers	26	6	3
SG	5	(Greece) Giorgos Sigalas (C)	7	4	2
SF	9	(Greece) Franko Nakić	0	2	0
PF	12	(Federal Republic of Yugoslavia) Dragan Tarlać	11	14	1
C	10	(Greece) Panagiotis Fasoulas	6	4	1
Reserves:			P	R	A
PG	4	(Greece) Efthimis Bakatsias	1	0	0
PF	7	(Greece) Dimitrios Papanikolaou	11	4	0
SF	8	(Greece) Nasos Galakteros	0	0	0
PG	11	(Federal Republic of Yugoslavia) Milan Tomić	9	4	1
C	12	(Germany) Chris Welp	2	1	1
Head coach:
(Federal Republic of Yugoslavia) Dušan Ivković

1996–97 FIBA EuroLeague
Champions

Olympiacos
First Title

Starters:			P	R	A
PG	10	(Federal Republic of Yugoslavia) Saša Đorđević	6	4	7
SG	9	(Spain) Xavi Fernández	0	1	0
SF	14	(Lithuania) Artūras Karnišovas	14	4	0
PF	4	(Spain) Andrés Jiménez (C)	16	9	2
C	7	(Puerto Rico) Ramón Rivas	6	4	1
Reserves:			P	R	A
PG	5	(Spain) Rafa Jofresa	9	2	1
SG	6	(Spain) Roger Esteller	3	0	1
C	8	(Spain) Enrique Andreu	2	0	0
PF	12	(Spain) Manel Bosch	0	2	0
C	15	(Spain) Roberto Dueñas	2	0	0
Head coach:
(Spain) Aíto García Reneses

== Awards ==
=== FIBA EuroLeague Final Four MVP ===
- (United States) David Rivers ( (Greece) Olympiacos)

=== FIBA EuroLeague Finals Top Scorer ===
- (United States) David Rivers ( (Greece) Olympiacos)

=== FIBA EuroLeague All-Final Four Team ===
FIBA EuroLeague All-Final Four Team
Player	Team	Ref.
(United States) David Rivers (MVP)	Olympiacos	
(Greece) Dimitrios Papanikolaou	Olympiacos	
(United States) Brian Howard	ASVEL	
(Spain) Andrés Jiménez	FC Barcelona Banca Catalana	
(Federal Republic of Yugoslavia) (Greece) Dragan Tarlać	Olympiacos	
