= 1993 FIBA European League Final Four =

Tournament details
- Arena: Peace and Friendship Stadium; Piraeus, Attica, Greece
- Dates: April 1993

Final positions
- Champions: (France) Limoges CSP (1st title)
- Runners-up: (Italy) Benetton Treviso
- Third place: (Greece) PAOK
- Fourth place: (Spain) Real Madrid Teka

Awards and statistics
- MVP: (Croatia) Toni Kukoč

The 1993 FIBA European League Final Four, or 1993 FIBA EuroLeague Final Four, was the 1992–93 season's FIBA European League Final Four tournament, organized by FIBA Europe.

Limoges CSP won its first title, after defeating Benetton Treviso in the final game. It was the first time a French team was the European champion.

== Bracket ==
Semi-finals
(Greece) PAOK	77
(Italy) Benetton Treviso	79
(Spain) Real Madrid Teka	52
(France) Limoges CSP	62

Final
(Italy) Benetton Treviso	55
(France) Limoges CSP	59
Third place
(Spain) Real Madrid Teka	70
(Greece) PAOK	76

== Semifinals ==
=== Real Madrid Teka – Limoges CSP ===
13 April 1993

Report

Real Madrid Teka (Spain)	52–62	(France) Limoges CSP
Scoring by half: 26–36, 26–26
Pts: Sabonis 19; Rebs: Brown, Sabonis 10; Asts: Lasa 5		Pts: Young 20; Rebs: Young 7 Asts: Bilba, Zdovc 3

Peace and Friendship Stadium, Piraeus, Athens
Attendance: 12,000

=== PAOK – Benetton Treviso ===
13 April 1993
21:15

Report

PAOK (Greece)	77–79	(Italy) Benetton Treviso
Scoring by half: 51–45, 26–34
Pts: Prelević 21; Rebs: Levingston 12; Asts: three players 1		Pts: Rusconi 23; Rebs: Kukoč 8 Asts: Kukoč 10

Peace and Friendship Stadium, Piraeus, Athens
Attendance: 15,000
Referees: Reuven Virovnik (ISR), Iztok Rems (SLO)

== Third place game ==
15 April 1993
19:00

Report

Real Madrid Teka (Spain)	70–76	(Greece) PAOK
Scoring by half: 38–46, 32–30
Pts: Biriukov 15; Rebs: Sabonis 18; Asts: three players 2		Pts: Barlow 20; Rebs: Fasoulas 14; Asts: Korfas, Prelević 3

Peace and Friendship Stadium, Piraeus, Athens
Attendance: 12,000
Referees: Reuven Virovnik (ISR), Roger Ekström (SWE)

== Final ==
15 April 1993
21:15

Report

Benetton Treviso (Italy)	55–59	(France) Limoges CSP
Scoring by half: 28–22, 27–37
Pts: Teagle 19; Rebs: Rusconi 15; Asts: Kukoč, Mian 3		Pts: Young 18; Rebs: Redden 10; Asts: Zdovc 3

Peace and Friendship Stadium, Piraeus, Athens
Attendance: 7,000
Referees: Wieslaw Zych (POL), Iztok Rems (SLO)

Benetton Treviso	Limoges CSP

Starters:			P	R	A
PG	4	(Italy) Marco Mian	5	3	3
SG	11	(United States) Terry Teagle	19	4	0
SF	7	(Croatia) Toni Kukoč	14	5	3
PF	12	(Italy) Alberto Vianini	2	3	0
C	15	(Italy) Stefano Rusconi	13	15	0
Reserves:			P	R	A
PG	6	(Italy) Massimo Iacopini (C)	2	4	0
C	10	(Italy) Nino Pellacani	0	3	0
SG	13	(Italy) Germán Scarone	0	0	0
Head coach:
(Croatia) Petar Skansi

1992–93 FIBA European League
Champions

Limoges CSP
1st title

Starters:			P	R	A
PG	9	(Slovenia) Jure Zdovc	9	1	3
SG	5	(France) Jimmy Vérove	3	2	0
SF	8	(United States) Michael Young	18	7	1
PF	14	(France) Jim Bilba	15	8	0
C	15	(France) Willie Redden	6	10	1
Reserves:			P	R	A
PG	4	(France) Frédéric Forte	4	1	2
PF	7	(France) Richard Dacoury (C)	3	4	0
C	13	(France) Franck Butter	1	4	1
Head coach:
(Federal Republic of Yugoslavia) Božidar Maljković

== Awards ==
=== FIBA European League Final Four MVP ===
- (Croatia) Toni Kukoč ( (Italy) Benetton Treviso)

=== FIBA European League Finals Top Scorer ===
- (United States) Terry Teagle ( (Italy) Benetton Treviso)

=== FIBA European League All-Final Four Team ===
FIBA European League All-Final Four Team
Player	Team	Ref.
(Greece) Jon Korfas	PAOK	
(Slovenia) Jure Zdovc	Limoges	
(Croatia) Toni Kukoč (MVP)	Treviso	
(United States) Cliff Levingston	PAOK	
(Italy) Stefano Rusconi	Treviso	
