= Toni Kukoč =

Croatian basketball player (born 1968)

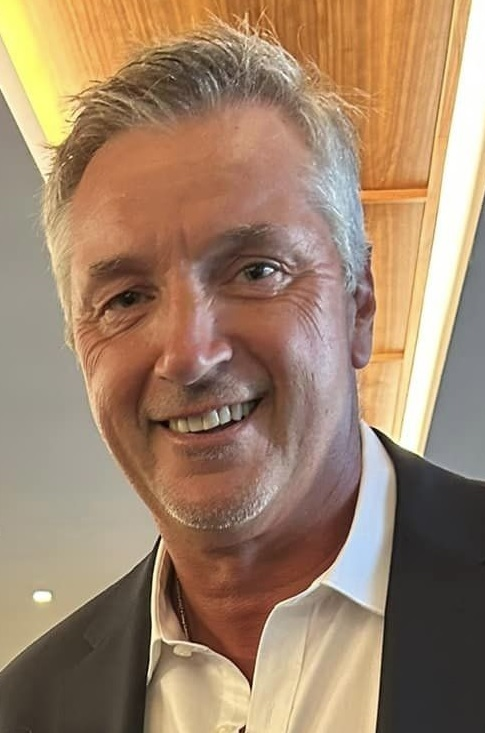
- Kukoč in 2023

Chicago Bulls
- Title: Special advisor
- League: NBA

Personal information
- Born: September 18, 1968 (age 58) Split, SR Croatia, SFR Yugoslavia
- Listed height: 6 ft 11 in (2.11 m)
- Listed weight: 235 lb (107 kg)

Career information
- NBA draft: 1990: 2nd round, 29th overall pick
- Drafted by: Chicago Bulls
- Playing career: 1985–2006
- Position: Small forward / power forward
- Number: 7

Career history
- 1985–1991: Jugoplastika
- 1991–1993: Benetton Treviso
- 1993–2000: Chicago Bulls
- 2000–2001: Philadelphia 76ers
- 2001–2002: Atlanta Hawks
- 2002–2006: Milwaukee Bucks

Career highlights
- 3× NBA champion (1996–1998); NBA Sixth Man of the Year (1996); NBA All-Rookie Second Team (1994); 3× EuroLeague champion (1989–1991); 3× EuroLeague Final Four MVP (1990, 1991, 1993); 2× FIBA European Selection (1991 2×); 50 Greatest EuroLeague Contributors (2008); 2× Triple Crown winner (1990, 1991); Italian League champion (1992); Italian Cup winner (1993); 4× Yugoslav League champion (1988–1991); 2× Yugoslav Cup winner (1990, 1991); 5× Euroscar Player of the Year (1990, 1991, 1994, 1996, 1998); 4× Mister Europa Player of the Year (1990–1992, 1996); 3× Croatian Sportsman of the Year (1989–1991); Franjo Bučar State Award for Sport (1992); FIBA World Championship MVP (1990); FIBA EuroBasket MVP (1991); FIBA Under-19 World Cup MVP (1987); FIBA Under-18 European Championship MVP (1986); FIBA's 50 Greatest Players

Career NBA statistics
- Points: 9,810 (11.6 ppg)
- Rebounds: 3,555 (4.2 rpg)
- Assists: 3,119 (3.7 apg)
- Stats at NBA.com
- Stats at Basketball Reference
- Basketball Hall of Fame
- FIBA Hall of Fame
Medals
Men's basketball
Representing Yugoslavia
Summer Olympic Games
Silver medal – second place	1988 Seoul
World Cup
Gold medal – first place	1990 Argentina
EuroBasket
Bronze medal – third place	1987 Greece
Gold medal – first place	1989 Yugoslavia
Gold medal – first place	1991 Italy
U19 World Cup
Gold medal – first place	1987 Italy	Under-19
European U-18 Championship
Gold medal – first place	1986 Austria	Under-18
European U-16 Championship
Gold medal – first place	1985 Bulgaria	Under-16
Goodwill Games
Gold medal – first place	1990 Seattle
Representing Croatia
Summer Olympic Games
Silver medal – second place	1992 Barcelona
World Cup
Bronze medal – third place	1994 Toronto
EuroBasket
Bronze medal – third place	1995 Greece

Toni Kukoč (pronounced [kukotʃ]; born September 18, 1968) is a Croatian former professional basketball player who serves as special advisor to Jerry Reinsdorf, the owner of the Chicago Bulls. After a highly successful period in European basketball, he was one of the first established European stars to play in the National Basketball Association (NBA). Kukoč played for four NBA teams between 1993 and 2006, winning the NBA Sixth Man of the Year Award in 1996. He is a three-time NBA champion, having won championships with the Chicago Bulls in 1996, 1997 and 1998.

Nicknamed "the Waiter" and "the Croatian Sensation", Kukoč is renowned for his exceptional basketball IQ, versatility and passing ability. Although his natural position was small forward, the 6 ft 11 in (2.11 m) Kukoč played multiple positions and demonstrated court vision and an outside shooting touch that were seldom found in players of his height. He also enjoyed success in international play, winning Olympic silver medals in 1988 (playing for Yugoslavia) and 1992 (playing for Croatia). Kukoč and Vassilis Spanoulis are the only players in history to receive the EuroLeague Final Four MVP honor on three occasions. He was elected to the FIBA Hall of Fame in 2017 and the Naismith Memorial Basketball Hall of Fame in 2021. In 2023, he was selected to be in the inaugural class of the Chicago Bulls' Ring of Honor.

== Early life ==
Kukoč grew up in Split, Croatia. His father was devoted to athletics, having played football as a goalkeeper in a lower ranked local club. Possessing excellent motor skills, young Toni grew up participating in different sports, including table tennis and football. He especially excelled in table tennis as an adolescent, winning different youth category titles. He soon switched to basketball as his sport of choice.

== Professional career ==
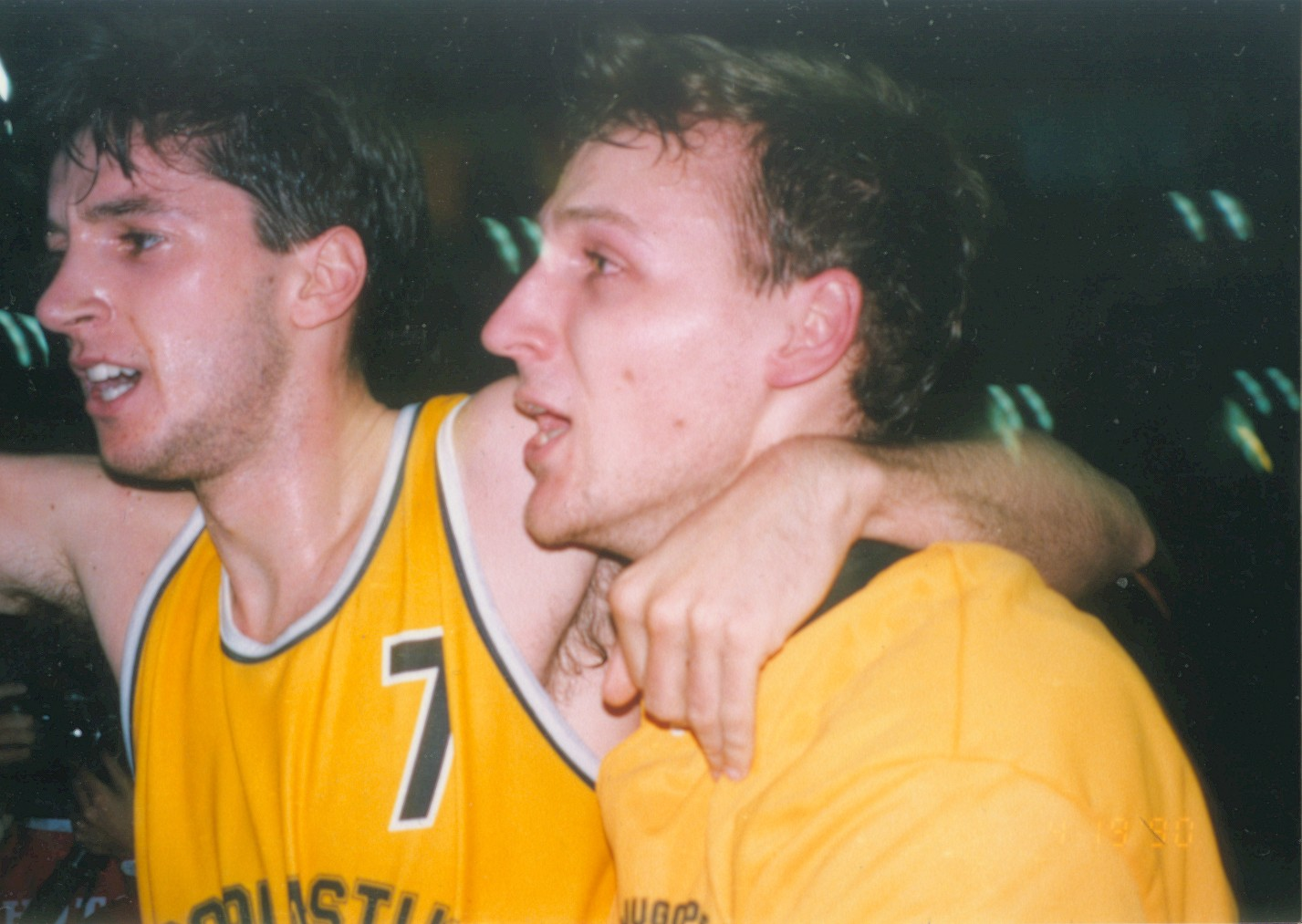
Kukoč (left) celebrating Split's second consecutive continental title with teammate Dino Rađa after beating FC Barcelona at the European Champions Cup Final Four final game in Zaragoza on April 19, 1990.

=== Europe ===
Kukoč began playing for his home town club, KK Jugoplastika, at the age of 17. He achieved significant success during his time with the club, winning the prestigious EuroLeague as the team recorded three winning year seasons consecutively (1989–1991). His team won the Triple Crown in 1990 and 1991. Kukoč was awarded as the EuroLeague Final Four MVP both times.

Afterwards, he signed for Benetton Treviso in 1991. His contract was worth $23 million for 6 years, making him one of the highest paid players in the world at the time with an average annual salary of $3,8 million. He won the Italian League championship in 1992 and the Italian Cup in 1993. He also played in the EuroLeague final in 1993, winning the EuroLeague Final Four MVP once again. He was nicknamed "the White Magic", "the Spider from Split", "the Pink Panther", "the Waiter", "Euro Magic", and "the Croatian Sensation". Throughout the 1990s, he won several European Basketball Player of the Year Awards.

=== Chicago Bulls ===
After being drafted by the NBA's Chicago Bulls in 1990, Kukoč continued to play in Europe, until finally reporting to the Bulls in 1993, when the team had just finished its first three-peat and had lost Michael Jordan to retirement. Although disappointed that he could not play with Jordan, Kukoč made his NBA debut on November 5, 1993.

The 6 ft 11 in (2.11 m) Kukoč came off the bench in 1993–94 behind small forward Scottie Pippen and power forward Horace Grant. On January 21, 1994, in a game against the Indiana Pacers, Reggie Miller made a mid-range jumper with 0.8 seconds remaining to give the Pacers a 95–93 lead. Scottie Pippen inbounded the ball to Kukoc, who hit a three-point jumper at the buzzer to give the Bulls the win, 96–95. Kukoč put up a solid rookie season, averaging double-digit scoring and earning a berth on the NBA All-Rookie Second Team.

On May 13, 1994, at the end of Game 3 of the Eastern Conference Semifinals, the Bulls and the New York Knicks were tied at 102 with 1.8 seconds left. Bulls coach Phil Jackson designed the last play for Kukoč, with Scottie Pippen charged with inbounding the basketball. Pippen was so angered by Jackson's decision to not let him take the potential game-winner that he refused to leave the bench and re-enter the game when the timeout was over. Kukoč did hit the game-winner, a 23-foot fadeaway jumper at the buzzer, though the Bulls eventually lost the series in seven games.

After Grant left in the offseason, Kukoč moved into the starting lineup and finished the 1994–95 season second on the Bulls in scoring, rebounds and assists, behind Pippen. Furthermore, Michael Jordan would return to the Bulls in March, fulfilling Kukoč's wish to play alongside him.

For the 1995–96 season, the Bulls were bolstered by both Jordan's return to full form and the offseason acquisition of exceptional rebounder Dennis Rodman. With Pippen still at small forward, coach Phil Jackson saw it best to have Kukoč continue to be a bench player. Kukoč was third on the team in scoring (behind Jordan and Pippen) and was rewarded for his efforts with the NBA Sixth Man of the Year Award. He also assisted the Bulls to a 25-game turnaround and the best record in league history at the time at 72–10 (later surpassed by the 2015–16 Golden State Warriors), as well as the fourth championship in team history. Kukoč was the 4th and is currently the last player to win the NBA Sixth Man of the Year Award and the NBA title in the same year having joined Kevin McHale, Bill Walton, and Bobby Jones in accomplishing that feat.

In 1997 NBA Finals, the Bulls defeated the Utah Jazz in six games, during which at the end of Game 6, Kukoč received the ball from Scottie Pippen and sealed the victory with a dunk to make the score 90–86 with just 0.6 seconds left. A year later, the Bulls defeated the Jazz again in the 1998 NBA Finals. In the 1997 NBA Finals, Kukoč came off the bench as the sixth man and was the team's leading scorer off the bench. By the 1998 postseason, however, Kukoč had moved into the starting lineup, starting all six games of the 1998 NBA Finals.

=== Career ending and retirement ===
During the 1998–99 offseason, Jordan retired, Pippen was traded to the Houston Rockets, and as Jackson's contract expired he took a break from coaching, effectively breaking up the Bulls' dynasty. Kukoč was the highest-scoring player from the Bulls' previous season that remained with the team.

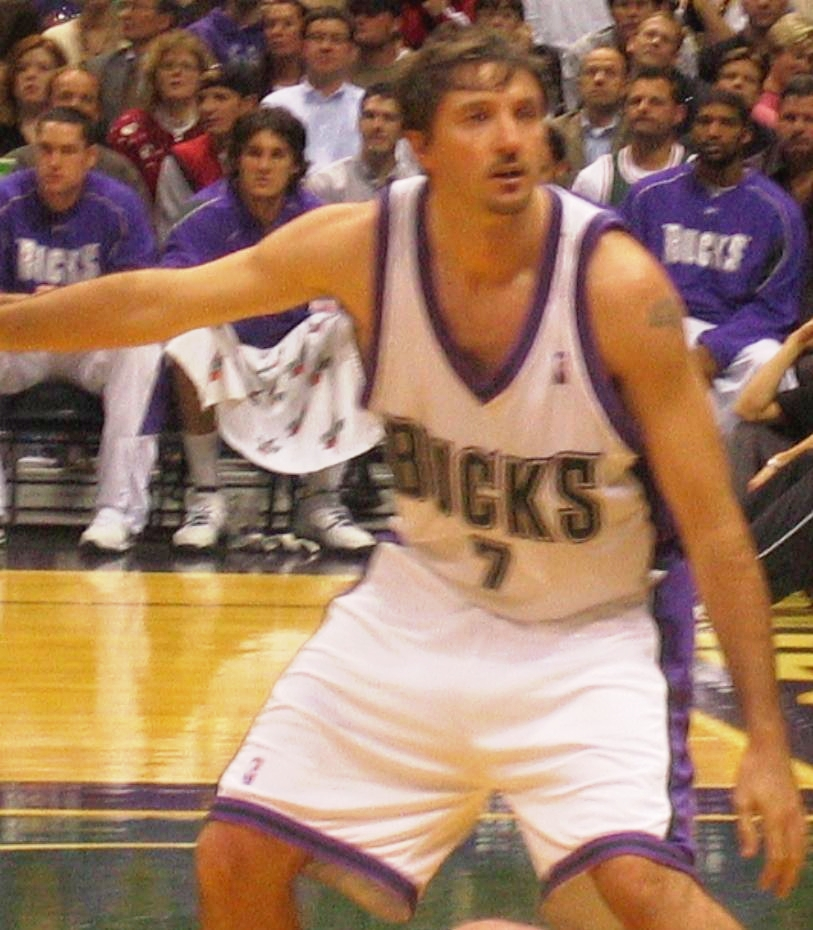
Kukoč with the Bucks in 2005

In the lockout-shortened 1998–99 season, he led the team in scoring, rebounding, and assists. On February 16, 2000 as Chicago continued their rebuilding scheme, Kukoč was traded to the Philadelphia 76ers in a three-team deal involving the Golden State Warriors that sent Bruce Bowen, John Starks and a 2000 first-round pick to the Bulls. The following season, he was dealt to the Atlanta Hawks, along with Nazr Mohammed, Pepe Sánchez, and Theo Ratliff, in a blockbuster deal that sent Dikembe Mutombo and Roshown McLeod to the 76ers.

After a short stint with the Hawks, he was traded to the Milwaukee Bucks, along with Leon Smith, in a deal for Glenn Robinson. During the 2003 NBA Playoffs, Kukoč averaged postseason career-highs of 14.8 points and 2.2 steals per game during a six game first round loss to the eventual Eastern Conference champion New Jersey Nets. On September 12, 2006, Kukoč announced that he would retire from professional basketball if he could not be signed by either the Milwaukee Bucks or the Chicago Bulls for the 2006–07 NBA season. Although various NBA teams had shown interest in his services, Kukoč expressed a desire to be close to his residence in the city of Highland Park, Illinois.

== National team career ==
=== Yugoslavia ===
Kukoč was on the junior Yugoslavian Under-19 national team that won the 1987 FIBA Under-19 World Cup, where he was named the tournament MVP. He was also on the senior men's Yugoslavian national team that got the silver medal at the 1988 Summer Olympic Games. He was named the MVP of the 1990 FIBA World Championship, where he also won a gold medal. With Yugoslavia, he also won the gold medals at the 1989 and 1991 EuroBaskets, as well as the 1990 Goodwill Games. He was also named the MVP of the 1991 EuroBasket tournament.

=== Croatia ===
Kukoč went on to win a silver medal with Croatia at the 1992 Summer Olympic Games in Barcelona. He also won bronze medals at both the 1994 FIBA World Championship in Canada and at the 1995 EuroBasket in Greece.

== NBA career statistics ==
Legend
GP	Games played	GS	Games started	MPG	Minutes per game
FG%	Field goal percentage	3P%	3-point field goal percentage	FT%	Free throw percentage
RPG	Rebounds per game	APG	Assists per game	SPG	Steals per game
BPG	Blocks per game	PPG	Points per game	**Bold**	Career high
†	Won an NBA championship

=== Regular season ===
Year	Team	GP	GS	MPG	FG%	3P%	FT%	RPG	APG	SPG	BPG	PPG
1993–94	Chicago	75	8	24.1	.431	.271	.743	4.0	3.4	1.1	.4	10.9
1994–95	Chicago	**81**	**55**	31.9	**.504**	.313	.748	5.4	4.6	1.3	.2	15.7
1995–96†	Chicago	**81**	20	26.0	.490	.403	**.772**	4.0	3.5	.8	.3	13.1
1996–97†	Chicago	57	15	28.2	.471	.331	.770	4.6	4.5	1.1	.5	13.2
1997–98†	Chicago	74	52	30.2	.455	.362	.708	4.4	4.2	1.0	.5	13.3
1998–99	Chicago	44	44	**37.6**	.420	.285	.740	**7.0**	5.3	1.1	.3	18.8
1999–2000	Chicago	24	23	36.2	.381	.231	.761	5.4	5.2	**1.8**	**.8**	18.0
1999–2000	Philadelphia	32	8	28.6	.438	.289	.673	4.5	4.4	1.0	.3	12.4
2000–01	Philadelphia	48	5	20.4	.458	.410	.591	3.4	1.9	.7	.1	8.0
2000–01	Atlanta	17	14	36.4	.492	**.481**	.681	5.7	**6.2**	.8	.3	**19.7**
2001–02	Atlanta	59	9	25.3	.419	.310	.712	3.7	3.6	.8	.3	9.9
2002–03	Milwaukee	63	0	27.0	.432	.361	.706	4.2	3.7	1.3	.5	11.6
2003–04	Milwaukee	73	0	20.8	.417	.292	.729	3.7	2.7	.8	.3	8.4
2004–05	Milwaukee	53	6	20.7	.410	.362	.721	3.0	3.0	.7	.2	5.6
2005–06	Milwaukee	65	0	15.7	.389	.306	.714	2.3	2.1	.5	.3	4.9
Career		846	259	26.3	.447	.335	.729	4.2	3.7	1.0	.3	11.6

=== Playoffs ===
Year	Team	GP	GS	MPG	FG%	3P%	FT%	RPG	APG	SPG	BPG	PPG
1994	Chicago	10	0	19.4	.448	.421	**.735**	4.0	3.6	.5	.3	9.3
1995	Chicago	10	10	37.2	.477	.438	.692	**6.8**	**5.7**	1.0	.2	13.8
1996†	Chicago	15	5	29.3	.391	.191	.838	4.2	3.9	.9	.3	10.8
1997†	Chicago	19	0	22.3	.360	.358	.707	2.8	2.8	.7	.2	7.9
1998†	Chicago	**21**	**17**	**30.3**	.486	.377	.645	3.9	2.9	1.2	.5	13.1
2000	Philadelphia	10	0	25.7	.419	.324	.588	3.1	1.7	1.0	.3	9.3
2003	Milwaukee	6	0	30.7	.492	.379	.700	4.2	3.7	**2.2**	.2	**14.8**
2004	Milwaukee	5	0	21.0	.500	.333	.500	2.8	.8	.6	.4	8.4
2006	Milwaukee	3	0	17.7	**.571**	**.625**	.500	1.7	3.0	.3	.0	7.3
Career		99	32	26.9	.440	.342	.697	3.9	3.2	1.0	.3	10.7

== Personal life ==
Kukoč and his wife, Renata, purchased their Highland Park home, just after arriving in Chicago, in 1993. They are both American citizens. After undergoing hip replacement surgery in 2009, he now plays at least one round of golf daily, and won Croatia's national amateur golf championship in 2011. His son, Marin, played for Highland Park High School's varsity basketball team, and then enrolled at the University of Pennsylvania. His daughter, Stela, played college volleyball at Miami University in Oxford, Ohio.

== Awards and accomplishments ==
=== Jugoplastika ===
- 3× EuroLeague champion: (1989–1991)
- 4× National Championship of Yugoslavia champion: (1988–1991)
- 2× Yugoslav Cup winner: (1990–1991)
- 2× Triple Crown winner: (1990–1991)

=== Benetton Treviso ===
- Italian League champion: (1992)
- Italian Cup winner: (1993)

=== Chicago Bulls ===
- 3× NBA champion: (1996–1998)
- 3× Eastern Conference champion: (1996–1998)
- 3× Central Division champion: (1996–1998)

=== National team ===
==== Yugoslavia ====
- 1985 FIBA Europe Under-16 Championship: Gold
- 1986 FIBA Europe Under-18 Championship: Gold
- 1987 FIBA Under-19 World Cup: Gold
- EuroBasket 1987: Bronze
- 1988 Summer Olympics: Silver
- EuroBasket 1989: Gold
- 1990 Goodwill Games: Gold
- 1990 FIBA World Championship: Gold
- EuroBasket 1991: Gold

==== Croatia ====
- 1992 Summer Olympics: Silver
- 1994 FIBA World Championship: Bronze
- EuroBasket 1995: Bronze

=== Individual ===
- 1986 FIBA Europe Under-18 Championship: MVP
- 1987 FIBA Under-19 World Cup: MVP
- 3× Croatian Sportsman of the Year: (1989–1991)
- FIBA World Cup All-Tournament Team: (1990)
- FIBA World Cup MVP: (1990)
- 5× Euroscar European Player of the Year: (1990–1991, 1994, 1996, 1998)
- 4× Mister Europa European Player of the Year: (1990–1992, 1996)
- 3× EuroLeague Final Four MVP: (1990, 1991, 1993)
- EuroLeague Finals Top Scorer: (1990)
- 2× EuroLeague All-Final Four Team: (1991, 1993)
- 2× FIBA European Selection: (1991 I, 1991 II)
- 2× FIBA EuroBasket All-Tournament Team: (1991, 1995)
- FIBA EuroBasket MVP: (1991)
- FIBA's 50 Greatest Players: (1991)
- Franjo Bučar State Award for Sport: (1992)
- NBA All-Rookie Second Team: (1994)
- NBA Sixth Man of the Year: (1996)
- 50 Greatest EuroLeague Contributors: (2008)
- FIBA Hall of Fame: (2017)
- Naismith Memorial Basketball Hall of Fame: (2021)
- All-Time NBA European Second Team: (2022)

== Filmography ==
- Once Brothers (2010)
- 250 Steps (2017)
- The Last Dance (2020)
- The Waiter - A Toni Kukoc Story (2021)

Awards and achievements
Preceded by Dragomir Bečanović	Yugoslav Sportsman of the Year; 1990	Succeeded by None
