= 1991 FIBA European Champions Cup Final Four =

International basketball tournament

Tournament details
- Arena: Palais Omnisport Paris-Bercy; Paris, France
- Dates: April 1991

Final positions
- Champions: (Socialist Federal Republic of Yugoslavia) POP 84 (3rd title)
- Runners-up: (Spain) FC Barcelona Banca Catalana
- Third place: (Israel) Maccabi Elite Tel Aviv
- Fourth place: (Italy) Scavolini Pesaro

Awards and statistics
- MVP: (Socialist Federal Republic of Yugoslavia) Toni Kukoč

The 1991 FIBA European Champions Cup Final Four was the 1990–91 season's FIBA European Champions Cup Final Four tournament, organized by FIBA Europe.

POP 84 won its third title in a row, after defeating FC Barcelona Banca Catalana in the final game.

== Bracket ==
Semi-finals
(Spain) FCB Banca Catalana | 101
(Israel) Maccabi Elite Tel Aviv | 67
(Socialist Federal Republic of Yugoslavia) POP 84 | 93
(Italy) Scavolini Pesaro | 87

Final
(Socialist Federal Republic of Yugoslavia) POP 84 | 70
(Spain) FCB Banca Catalana | 65
Third place
(Israel) Maccabi Elite Tel Aviv | 83
(Italy) Scavolini Pesaro | 81

== Semifinals ==
=== FC Barcelona Banca Catalana – Maccabi Elite Tel Aviv ===
16 April 1991
17:30

Boxscore

| FC Barcelona Banca Catalana (Spain) | 101–67 | (Israel) Maccabi Elite Tel Aviv |
Scoring by half: 50–38, 51–29
| Pts: Montero 25 | | Pts: Horton 16 |

Palais Omnisport Paris-Bercy, Paris
Attendance: 12,500
Referees: Kostas Rigas (GRE), Philippe Mailhabiau (FRA)

=== POP 84 – Scavolini Pesaro ===
16 April 1991
20:30

Boxscore

| POP 84 (Socialist Federal Republic of Yugoslavia) | 93–87 | (Italy) Scavolini Pesaro |
Scoring by half: 41–45, 52–42
| Pts: Savić 25 | | Pts: Daye 29 |

Palais Omnisport Paris-Bercy, Paris
Attendance: 12,500
Referees: Mikhail Davidov (URS), Alan Richardson (ENG)

== Third place game ==
18 April 1991
17:30

Boxscore

| Maccabi Elite Tel Aviv (Israel) | 83–81 | (Italy) Scavolini Pesaro |
Scoring by half: 42–39, 41–42
| Pts: Jamchy 22 | | Pts: Cook 16 |

Palais Omnisport Paris-Bercy, Paris
Attendance: 13,500
Referees: Philippe Mailhabiau (FRA), Alan Richardson (ENG)

== Final ==
18 April 1991
20:30

Boxscore

| POP 84 (Socialist Federal Republic of Yugoslavia) | 70–65 | (Spain) FC Barcelona Banca Catalana |
Scoring by half: 40–34, 30–31
| Pts: Savić 27; Rebs: Kukoč 7 Asts: Sretenović 7 | | Pts: Ortiz, Trumbo 12; Rebs: Ortiz 12; Asts: Epi 4 |

Palais Omnisport Paris-Bercy, Paris
Attendance: 13,500
Referees: Kostas Rigas (GRE), Mikhail Davidov (URS)

| POP 84 | FC Barcelona Banca Catalana |

| Starters: | | | P | R | A |
|---|---|---|---|---|---|
| PG | 4 | (Socialist Federal Republic of Yugoslavia) Zoran Sretenović | 7 | 3 | 7 |
| SG | 5 | (Socialist Federal Republic of Yugoslavia) Velimir Perasović | 6 | 1 | 3 |
| SF | 7 | (Socialist Federal Republic of Yugoslavia) Toni Kukoč (C) | 8 | 7 | 2 |
| PF | 14 | (United States) Avie Lester | 11 | 1 | 1 |
| C | 13 | (Socialist Federal Republic of Yugoslavia) Zoran Savić | 27 | 4 | 0 |
| Reserves: | | | P | R | A |
| PG | 6 | (Socialist Federal Republic of Yugoslavia) Luka Pavićević | 7 | 2 | 4 |
| SF | 8 | (Socialist Federal Republic of Yugoslavia) Paško Tomić | DNP | | |
| PF | 9 | (Socialist Federal Republic of Yugoslavia) Teo Čizmić | DNP | | |
| PG | 10 | (Socialist Federal Republic of Yugoslavia) Petar Naumoski | DNP | | |
| C | 11 | (Socialist Federal Republic of Yugoslavia) Žan Tabak | 2 | 3 | 0 |
| SF | 12 | (Socialist Federal Republic of Yugoslavia) Velibor Radović | DNP | | |
| PF | 15 | (Socialist Federal Republic of Yugoslavia) Aramis Naglić | 2 | 2 | 0 |
Head coach:
(Socialist Federal Republic of Yugoslavia) Željko Pavličević

1990–91 FIBA European Champions Cup
Champions

POP 84
Third title

| Starters: | | | P | R | A |
|---|---|---|---|---|---|
| PG | 7 | (Spain) Nacho Solozábal (C) | 7 | 0 | 2 |
| SG | 15 | (Spain) Epi | 8 | 2 | 4 |
| SF | 9 | (Spain) Lisard González | 9 | 2 | 1 |
| PF | 11 | (Puerto Rico) José Ortiz | 12 | 12 | 1 |
| C | 14 | (United States) Audie Norris | 8 | 3 | 3 |
| Reserves: | | | P | R | A |
| PF | 4 | (Spain) Andrés Jiménez | DNP | | |
| PG | 5 | (Spain) José Luis Galilea | 0 | 0 | 1 |
| C | 6 | (Spain) Ángel Almeida | DNP | | |
| C | 8 | (Spain) Steve Trumbo | 12 | 6 | 0 |
| PG | 10 | (Spain) José Antonio Montero | 9 | 3 | 3 |
| SG | 13 | (Spain) Roger Esteller | DNP | | |
Head coach:
(Socialist Federal Republic of Yugoslavia) Božidar Maljković

== Awards ==
=== FIBA European Champions Cup Final Four MVP ===
- (Socialist Federal Republic of Yugoslavia) Toni Kukoč ( (Socialist Federal Republic of Yugoslavia) POP 84)

=== FIBA European Champions Cup Finals Top Scorer ===
- (Socialist Federal Republic of Yugoslavia) Zoran Savić ( (Socialist Federal Republic of Yugoslavia) POP 84)

=== FIBA European Champions Cup All-Final Four Team ===
FIBA European Champions Cup All-Final Four Team
| Player | Team | Ref. |
| (Spain) José Antonio Montero | FC Barcelona | |
| (Socialist Federal Republic of Yugoslavia) Velimir Perasović | POP 84 | |
| (Socialist Federal Republic of Yugoslavia) Toni Kukoč (MVP) | POP 84 | |
| (Socialist Federal Republic of Yugoslavia) Zoran Savić | POP 84 | |
| (United States) Audie Norris | FC Barcelona Banca Catalana | |
