= José Antonio Montero =

Spanish basketball player

Personal information
- Born: 3 January 1965 (age 61) Barcelona, Spain
- Listed height: 193 cm (6 ft 4 in)
- Listed weight: 200 lb (91 kg)

Career information
- NBA draft: 1987: 5th round, 113th overall pick
- Drafted by: Atlanta Hawks
- Playing career: 1983–1998
- Position: Point guard
- Number: 9

Career history
- 1983–1990: Joventut Badalona
- 1990–1997: FC Barcelona
- 1997–1998: Limoges CSP

Career highlights
- FIBA European Selection (1990); FIBA Korać Cup champion (1990); 3× Spanish League champion (1995–1997); 2× Spanish Cup winner (1991, 1994)
- Stats at Basketball Reference

José Antonio Montero Botanch (born 3 January 1965 in Barcelona, Spain) is a retired Spanish professional basketball player.

== Professional career ==
He started his career from Badalona and signed for Barcelona in 1990, after the latter paid 25 million pesetas as fee (150,000 euros). Montero was selected 113th overall, by the Atlanta Hawks, at the 1987 NBA draft. He was the second Spanish player to be drafted by an NBA franchise, after Fernando Martín. However, he never played in the NBA.

As a member of FC Barcelona, he competed in two EuroLeague Finals, in 1991, and 1996. He was a FIBA European Selection in 1990. In 1991, he was selected to the EuroLeague All-Final Four Team. Montero ended his career his Limoges CSP in 1998.

== National team career ==
Montero was a regular member of the senior Spanish national team. With Spain, he reached the semifinals at EuroBasket 1987.

== Awards and accomplishments ==
- 3× Spanish League Champion: 1994–95, 1995–96, 1996–97
- 2× Spanish Cup Winner: 1990–91, 1993–94
- 2× EuroLeague runner up: 1991, 1996
- FIBA Saporta Cup runner up: 1988
- FIBA Korać Cup Champion: 1990
