= 2017 EuroLeague Final Four =

Basketball competition held in Istanbul, Turkey

- Logo for 2017 Final Four in Istanbul
- Season: 2016–17 EuroLeague

Tournament details
- Arena: Sinan Erdem Dome; Istanbul, Turkey
- Dates: 19–21 May 2017

Final positions
- Champions: (Turkey) Fenerbahçe (1st title)
- Runners-up: (Greece) Olympiacos
- Third place: (Russia) CSKA Moscow
- Fourth place: (Spain) Real Madrid

Awards and statistics
- MVP: (Nigeria) Ekpe Udoh
- Top scorer(s): (Spain) Sergio Llull (35)
- Attendance: 59,276 (total)

The 2017 EuroLeague Final Four was the concluding EuroLeague Final Four tournament of the 2016–17 EuroLeague season, the 60th season of Europe's premier level club basketball tournament, and the 17th season since it is organised by Euroleague Basketball. It was the 30th Final Four of the modern EuroLeague Final Four era (1988–present), and the 32nd time overall that the competition was concluded with a final four format. The Final Four was played at the Sinan Erdem Dome in Istanbul, Turkey, in May 2017. Fenerbahçe won its first EuroLeague title.

== Venue ==
On September 27, 2016, Euroleague Basketball announced that the Final Four will be held in the Sinan Erdem Dome in Istanbul. It has a seating capacity of 22,500 for concerts, for the sport of basketball and tennis it has a seating capacity of 16,647 people, making it Turkey's largest multi-purpose indoor venue and the third largest in Europe (although it is not the third largest in Europe in capacity for basketball use). The arena is named after Sinan Erdem (1927–2003), who was the President of the Turkish Olympic Committee, from 1989, until his death in 2003.

Istanbul	2017 EuroLeague Final Four (Europe)
Sinan Erdem Dome	2017 EuroLeague Final Four (Europe)
Capacity: 16,647	2017 EuroLeague Final Four (Europe)

== Bracket ==
Semifinals; 19 May
(Turkey) Fenerbahçe	84
(Spain) Real Madrid	75
(Russia) CSKA Moscow	78
(Greece) Olympiacos	82

Championship game 21 May
(Turkey) Fenerbahçe	80
(Greece) Olympiacos	64
Third place game
(Spain) Real Madrid	70
(Russia) CSKA Moscow	94

== Semifinals ==
=== Semifinal B ===
19 May 2017	CSKA Moscow (Russia)	78–82	(Greece) Olympiacos	Istanbul
17:30 (CEST)	Scoring by quarter: 18–12, 22–21, 24–27, 14–22
	Pts: Teodosić 23; Rebs: Khryapa 8 Asts: De Colo 3 PIR: Teodosić 17	Boxscore	Pts: three players 14; Rebs: Papanikolaou 9 Asts: Spanoulis 6 PIR: Printezis 15	Arena: Sinan Erdem Dome; Attendance: 13,967; Referees: Daniel Hierrezuelo (ESP), Damir Javor (SLO), Robert Lottermoser (GER)

Starters:			Pts	Reb	Ast
PG	1	(France) Nando de Colo	16	1	3
SG	9	(United States) Aaron Jackson	12	0	1
SF	41	(Russia) Nikita Kurbanov	2	2	0
PF	20	(Russia) Andrey Vorontsevich	2	4	0
C	42	(United States) Kyle Hines	8	3	0
Reserves:					
PG	4	(Serbia) Miloš Teodosić	23	2	1
C	6	(United States) James Augustine	6	6	0
SF	7	(Russia) Vitaly Fridzon	0	0	0
PF	11	(Russia) Semyon Antonov	DNP		
C	19	(United Kingdom) Joel Freeland	DNP		
SG	22	(United States) Cory Higgins	6	6	0
PF	31	(Russia) Victor Khryapa	3	8	2
Head coach:
(Hellenic Basketball Federation) Dimitrios Itoudis

CSKA Moscow	Olympiacos

Starters:			Pts	Reb	Ast
PG	17	(Greece) Vangelis Mantzaris	12	6	3
SG	7	(Greece) Vassilis Spanoulis	14	1	6
SF	16	(Greece) Kostas Papanikolaou	14	9	1
PF	15	(Greece) Georgios Printezis	14	7	1
C	11	(Serbia) Nikola Milutinov	5	2	2
Reserves:					
PG	1	(United States) Erick Green	8	1	0
C	2	(Canada) Khem Birch	4	4	0
C	4	(United States) Patric Young	0	1	0
PG	5	(Greece) Vassilis Toliopoulos	DNP		
PF	6	(Greece) Ioannis Papapetrou	3	2	2
PG	9	(United States) Dominic Waters	DNP		
C	10	(Greece) Dimitrios Agravanis	8	7	0
Head coach:
(Hellenic Basketball Federation) Ioannis Sfairopoulos

=== Semifinal A ===
19 May 2017	Fenerbahçe (Turkey)	84–75	(Spain) Real Madrid	Istanbul
20:30 (CEST)	Scoring by quarter: 21–13, 23–21, 19–16, 21–25
	Pts: Udoh 18; Rebs: Udoh 12; Asts: Udoh 8 PIR: Udoh 36	Boxscore	Pts: Llull 28; Rebs: Hunter 8 Asts: Llull 7 PIR: Llull 32	Arena: Sinan Erdem Dome; Attendance: 15,671; Referees: Luigi Lamonica (ITA), Borys Rhyzhyk (UKR), Oļegs Latiševs (LAT)

Starters:			Pts	Reb	Ast
PG	35	(Turkey) Bobby Dixon	9	1	3
SG	13	(Serbia) Bogdan Bogdanović	14	6	1
SF	33	(Serbia) Nikola Kalinić	12	6	6
PF	24	(Czech Republic) Jan Veselý	12	3	3
C	8	(Nigeria) Ekpe Udoh	18	12	8
Reserves:					
SG	10	(Turkey) Melih Mahmutoğlu	DNP		
C	12	(North Macedonia) Pero Antić	DNP		
PF	15	(Canada) Anthony Bennett	DNP		
PG	16	(Greece) Kostas Sloukas	9	3	1
SF	21	(United States) James Nunnally	2	1	2
C	44	(Jordan) Ahmet Düverioğlu	DNP		
SF	70	(Italy) Luigi Datome	8	1	0
Head coach:
(Basketball Federation of Serbia) Željko Obradović

Fenerbahçe	Real Madrid

Starters:			Pts	Reb	Ast
PG	7	(Slovenia) Luka Dončić	0	2	3
SG	23	(Spain) Sergio Llull	28	1	8
SF	8	(Lithuania) Jonas Mačiulis	0	0	1
PF	3	(United States) Anthony Randolph	7	2	0
C	14	(Mexico) Gustavo Ayón	2	4	0
Reserves:					
PG	4	(Croatia) Dontaye Draper	0	0	1
SG	5	(Spain) Rudy Fernández	0	1	0
PF	9	(Spain) Felipe Reyes	DNP		
SG	20	(Azerbaijan) Jaycee Carroll	21	1	0
C	21	(United States) Othello Hunter	6	7	0
PF	33	(United States) Trey Thompkins	8	3	0
SF	34	(Sweden) Jeffery Taylor	3	0	0
Head coach:
(Spanish Basketball Federation) Pablo Laso

== Third place game ==
CSKA Moscow won the penultimate game of the tournament, securing third place over Real Madrid and ending the campaign with the best overall record – twenty-six wins and nine defeats. A significant factor to their win was a superior three-point shooting rate. CSKA lead from the start, taking five points before a reply from Real, and ended the first quarter with a 23–10 lead. There was nothing between teams during the second and third quarters, allowing CSKA to maintain their thirteen-point lead into the final quarter. CSKA added to their score and pulled away from Real to finish with a score of 94–70.

21 May 2017	Real Madrid (Spain)	70–94	(Russia) CSKA Moscow	Istanbul
17:00 (CEST)	Scoring by quarter: 10–23, 22–22, 24–24, 14–25
	Pts: Ayón, Mačiulis 11; Rebs: Ayón 6 Asts: Llull 4 PIR: Ayón 16	Boxscore	Pts: Hines 14; Rebs: Hines 7 Asts: Teodosić 6 PIR: Higgins, Hines 18	Arena: Sinan Erdem Dome; Attendance: 13,967; Referees: Damir Javor (SLO), Milivoje Jovčić (SRB), Fernando Rocha (POR)

Starters:			Pts	Reb	Ast
PG	23	(Spain) Sergio Llull	7	0	4
SG	8	(Lithuania) Jonas Mačiulis	11	3	1
SF	34	(Sweden) Jeffery Taylor	8	1	0
PF	3	(United States) Anthony Randolph	4	3	0
C	14	(Mexico) Gustavo Ayón	11	6	3
Reserves:					
PG	4	(Croatia) Dontaye Draper	5	0	0
SG	5	(Spain) Rudy Fernández	4	0	2
SF	6	(Argentina) Andrés Nocioni	4	3	1
PG	7	(Slovenia) Luka Dončić	6	4	2
PF	9	(Spain) Felipe Reyes	5	2	1
SG	20	(Azerbaijan) Jaycee Carroll	3	0	1
PF	33	(United States) Trey Thompkins	2	2	0
Head coach:
(Spanish Basketball Federation) Pablo Laso

Real Madrid	CSKA Moscow

Starters:			Pts	Reb	Ast
PG	1	(France) Nando de Colo	13	4	4
SG	9	(United States) Aaron Jackson	13	2	5
SF	41	(Russia) Nikita Kurbanov	2	0	0
PF	20	(Russia) Andrey Vorontsevich	10	6	0
C	42	(United States) Kyle Hines	14	7	1
Reserves:					
PG	4	(Serbia) Miloš Teodosić	7	1	6
C	6	(United States) James Augustine	4	3	0
SF	7	(Russia) Vitaly Fridzon	12	3	2
PF	11	(Russia) Semyon Antonov	3	1	0
C	19	(United Kingdom) Joel Freeland	1	2	0
SG	22	(United States) Cory Higgins	12	3	3
PF	30	(Russia) Mikhail Kulagin	3	0	0
Head coach:
(Hellenic Basketball Federation) Dimitrios Itoudis

== Championship game ==
Fenerbahçe played in its second consecutive championship game, after it lost to CSKA Moscow in 2016. Olympiacos returned to the title game for the first time since 2015.

The first two quarters were evenly matched. Fenerbahçe opened the scoring and led by 5–1 before Olympiacos replied with five unanswered points. They relinquished the lead soon after and were unable to regain it for the remainder of the game. Fenerbahçe took an eight-point lead over Olympiacos after the first quarter, with a score of 26–18, though Olympiacos had reduced the deficit to five points, to 39–34, by half time. Fenerbahçe broke away in the third quarter, taking a commanding twelve point lead to go into the fourth quarter 60–48 up. An 11–2 run by Fenerbahçe at the start of the final quarter effectively secured the title for the club. The game ended with a score of 80–64. Fenerbahçe led at each quarter on its way to the title, and head coach Željko Obradović added to his record total of nine EuroLeague championships. Fenerbahçe became the first Turkish club to win the EuroLeague championship.

Bogdan Bogdanović and Nikola Kalinić both scored the most points, with 17 each, while Ekpe Udoh set a EuroLeague championship game record of five blocks. Udoh was also named EuroLeague Final Four MVP.

21 May 2017	Fenerbahçe (Turkey)	80–64	(Greece) Olympiacos	Istanbul
20:00 (CEST)	Scoring by quarter: 26–18, 13–16, 21–14, 20–16
	Pts: Bogdanović, Kalinić 17; Rebs: Udoh 9 Asts: Kalinić, Sloukas 5 PIR: Udoh 29	Boxscore	Pts: Birch 14; Rebs: Papanikolaou 5 Asts: Spanoulis 8 PIR: Birch 16	Arena: Sinan Erdem Dome; Attendance: 15,671; Referees: Daniel Hierrezuelo (ESP), Borys Rhyzhyk (UKR), Oļegs Latiševs (LAT)

Starters:			Pts	Reb	Ast
PG	35	(Turkey) Bobby Dixon	8	2	2
SG	13	(Serbia) Bogdan Bogdanović	17	5	1
SF	33	(Serbia) Nikola Kalinić	17	5	5
PF	24	(Czech Republic) Jan Veselý	8	8	2
C	8	(Nigeria) Ekpe Udoh	10	9	4
Reserves:					
SG	10	(Turkey) Melih Mahmutoğlu	0	0	0
C	12	(North Macedonia) Pero Antić	4	1	1
PF	15	(Canada) Anthony Bennett	0	0	0
PG	16	(Greece) Kostas Sloukas	3	1	5
SF	21	(United States) James Nunnally	2	1	0
C	44	(Jordan) Ahmet Düverioğlu	0	0	0
SF	70	(Italy) Luigi Datome	11	6	0
Head coach:
(Basketball Federation of Serbia) Željko Obradović

Fenerbahçe	Olympiacos

Fenerbahçe	Statistics	Olympiacos
13/31 (41.9%)	2-pt field goals	14/35 (40%)
13/25 (52%)	3-pt field goals	9/26 (34.6%)
15/19 (78.9%)	Free throws	9/12 (75%)
11	Offensive rebounds	10
29	Defensive rebounds	20
40	Total rebounds	30
20	Assists	18
8	Turnovers	6
2	Steals	7
9	Blocks	2
18	Fouls	20

Starters:			Pts	Reb	Ast
PG	17	(Greece) Vangelis Mantzaris	9	1	3
SG	7	(Greece) Vassilis Spanoulis	9	2	8
SF	16	(Greece) Kostas Papanikolaou	3	5	3
PF	15	(Greece) Georgios Printezis	7	1	1
C	2	(Canada) Khem Birch	14	0	0
Reserves:					
PG	1	(United States) Erick Green	7	4	0
C	4	(United States) Patric Young	0	0	0
PG	5	(Greece) Vassilis Toliopoulos	3	0	0
PF	6	(Greece) Ioannis Papapetrou	0	2	0
PG	9	(United States) Dominic Waters	2	1	1
C	10	(Greece) Dimitrios Agravanis	0	3	1
C	11	(Serbia) Nikola Milutinov	10	4	1
Head coach:
(Hellenic Basketball Federation) Ioannis Sfairopoulos

- Team captains (C): (Turkey) Melih Mahmutoğlu (Fenerbahçe) and (Greece) Vassilis Spanoulis (Olympiacos)
