= EuroLeague All-Final Four Team =

European basketball award

The EuroLeague All-Final Four Team, or FIBA SuproLeague All-Final Four Team, was an award given by Europe's premier level league, the FIBA Euroleague, to the top five basketball players of each season's EuroLeague Final Four competition. The EuroLeague Final Four MVP, was selected among the five players of the EuroLeague All-Final Four Team. The award existed during the era in which the EuroLeague was organized by FIBA Europe. It was given for the last time by the FIBA SuproLeague, during the 2000–01 season's FIBA SuproLeague Final Four. After the Euroleague Basketball Company took over control of the EuroLeague, the award was no longer given out, and was replaced by the All-EuroLeague Team award, which was an award for the competition's whole season, up until the EuroLeague Final Four stage.

== EuroLeague All-Final Four Team (1991–2001) ==
Player (X)	Denotes the number of times the player was selected to the EuroLeague Final Four Team.

Season	Position	Player	Club	Ref.
1991	PG	(Spain) José Antonio Montero	(Spain) FC Barcelona Banca Catalana	
1991	SG	(Socialist Federal Republic of Yugoslavia) Velimir Perasović	(Socialist Federal Republic of Yugoslavia) POP 84	
1991	SF	(Socialist Federal Republic of Yugoslavia) Toni Kukoč (MVP)	(Socialist Federal Republic of Yugoslavia) POP 84	
1991	PF	(Socialist Federal Republic of Yugoslavia) Zoran Savić	(Socialist Federal Republic of Yugoslavia) POP 84	
1991	C	(United States) Audie Norris	(Spain) FC Barcelona Banca Catalana	
1992	PG	(Socialist Federal Republic of Yugoslavia) Sašha Đjorđjević	(Socialist Federal Republic of Yugoslavia) Partizan	
1992	SG	(Socialist Federal Republic of Yugoslavia) Sasha Danilović (MVP)	(Socialist Federal Republic of Yugoslavia) Partizan	
1992	SF	(Spain) Jordi Villacampa	(Spain) Montigalà Joventut	
1992	PF	(United States) Harold Pressley	(Spain) Montigalà Joventut	
1992	C	(Socialist Federal Republic of Yugoslavia) Slaviša Koprivica	(Socialist Federal Republic of Yugoslavia) Partizan	
1993	PG	(Greece) Jon Korfas	(Greece) PAOK	
1993	SG	(Slovenia) Jure Zdovc	(France) Limoges CSP	
1993	SF	(Croatia) Toni Kukoč (2) (MVP)	(Italy) Benetton Treviso	
1993	PF	(United States) Cliff Levingston	(Greece) PAOK	
1993	C	(Italy) Stefano Rusconi	(Italy) Benetton Treviso	
1994	PG	(Greece) Nikos Galis	(Greece) Panathinaikos	
1994	SG	(Greece) Georgios Sigalas	(Greece) Olympiacos	
1994	SF	(Spain) Jordi Villacampa (2)	(Spain) 7up Joventut	
1994	PF	(Federal Republic of Yugoslavia) Žarko Paspalj (MVP)	(Greece) Olympiacos	
1994	C	(United States) Corny Thompson	(Spain) 7up Joventut	
1995	PG	(Spain) José Miguel Antúnez	(Spain) Real Madrid Teka	
1995	SG	(Spain) Ismael Santos	(Spain) Real Madrid Teka	
1995	SF	(United States) Eddie Johnson	(Greece) Olympiacos	
1995	PF	(United States) Joe Arlauckas	(Spain) Real Madrid Teka	
1995	C	(Lithuania) Arvydas Sabonis (MVP)	(Spain) Real Madrid Teka	
1996	PG	(Russia) Vasily Karasev	(Russia) CSKA Moscow	
1996	SG	(Greece) Fragiskos Alvertis	(Greece) Panathinaikos	
1996	SF	(Lithuania) Artūras Karnišovas	(Spain) FC Barcelona Banca Catalana	
1996	PF	(United States) Dominique Wilkins (MVP)	(Greece) Panathinaikos	
1996	C	(Croatia) Stojko Vranković	(Greece) Panathinaikos	
1997	PG	(United States) David Rivers (MVP)	(Greece) Olympiacos	
1997	SG	(Greece) Dimitrios Papanikolaou	(Greece) Olympiacos	
1997	SF	(United States) Brian Howard	(France) ASVEL	
1997	PF	(Spain) Andrés Jiménez	(Spain) FC Barcelona Banca Catalana	
1997	C	(Federal Republic of Yugoslavia) (Greece) Dragan Tarlać	(Greece) Olympiacos	
1998	PG	(France) Antoine Rigaudeau	(Italy) Kinder Bologna	
1998	SG	(Federal Republic of Yugoslavia) Sasha Danilović (2)	(Italy) Kinder Bologna	
1998	SF	(United States) Henry Williams	(Italy) Benetton Treviso	
1998	PF	(Federal Republic of Yugoslavia) Dejan Tomašević	(Federal Republic of Yugoslavia) Partizan Zepter	
1998	C	(Federal Republic of Yugoslavia) Zoran Savić (2) (MVP)	(Italy) Kinder Bologna	
1999	PG	(United States) Tyus Edney (MVP)	(Lithuania) Žalgiris	
1999	SG	(United States) Anthony Bowie	(Lithuania) Žalgiris	
1999	SF	(Lithuania) Saulius Štombergas	(Lithuania) Žalgiris	
1999	PF	(Slovenia) (Greece) Rašho Nesterović	(Italy) Kinder Bologna	
1999	C	(Lithuania) Eurelijus Žukauskas	(Lithuania) Žalgiris	
2000	PG	(Israel) Oded Kattash	(Greece) Panathinaikos	
2000	SG	(Turkey) Hedo Türkoğlu	(Turkey) Efes Pilsen	
2000	SF	(Federal Republic of Yugoslavia) Dejan Bodiroga	(Greece) Panathinaikos	
2000	PF	(United States) Nate Huffman	(Israel) Maccabi Elite Tel Aviv	
2000	C	(Federal Republic of Yugoslavia) Željko Rebrača (MVP)	(Greece) Panathinaikos	
2001 (Note: During the 2000–01 season, the top professional men's basketball club competition in Europe was split into two different leagues. The Euroleague 2000–01 season, which was organized by the Euroleague Basketball Company, and the FIBA SuproLeague 2000–01 season, which was organized by FIBA Europe. This happened after the Euroleague Basketball Company took over the main control of Europe's premier basketball competition in 2000, from FIBA Europe. A few of the top clubs of the EuroLeague, decided initially not to break away from FIBA Europe, and so a new version of FIBA's EuroLeague was formed, called the FIBA SuproLeague. It continued the tradition of having the league culminate at the EuroLeague Final Four, with the 2001 FIBA SuproLeague Final Four. On the other hand, the EuroLeague Basketball competition did not hold an edition of the EuroLeague Final Four that season, opting instead to end the season with the 2001 Euroleague Finals. After the 2000–01 season, all of the top basketball clubs of Europe decided to join with EuroLeague Basketball, and the FIBA version of the league officially ended with the 2000–01 FIBA SuproLeague. The next season's edition of the EuroLeague, the Euroleague 2001–02 season, cancelled the 5 game finals series format, and continued the long-held tradition of culminating with the EuroLeague Final Four. It also continued to give out the EuroLeague Final Four MVP award. However, it also discontinued the awarding of the EuroLeague All-Final Four Team, making the 2001 FIBA SuproLeague Final Four, the last time that the EuroLeague All-Final Four Team award was given.)	PG	(United States) (Slovenia) Ariel McDonald (MVP)	(Israel) Maccabi Elite Tel Aviv	
2001	SG	(United States) Anthony Parker	(Israel) Maccabi Elite Tel Aviv	
2001	SF	(Federal Republic of Yugoslavia) Dejan Bodiroga (2)	(Greece) Panathinaikos	
2001	PF	(Russia) Andrei Kirilenko	(Russia) CSKA Moscow	
2001	C	(United States) Nate Huffman (2)	(Israel) Maccabi Elite Tel Aviv	

== Players with multiple EuroLeague All-Final Four Team selections ==
The following table only lists players with at least two total EuroLeague All-Final Four Team selections.

Player	Number Of Selections	Regular Season MVP	Top 16 MVP	Full Season MVP	Final Four MVP
(Socialist Federal Republic of Yugoslavia) (Croatia) Toni Kukoč	2	0	0	0	3
(Federal Republic of Yugoslavia) Dejan Bodiroga	2	0	1	0	2
(Socialist Federal Republic of Yugoslavia) (Federal Republic of Yugoslavia) Sasha Danilović	2	0	0	0	1
(Socialist Federal Republic of Yugoslavia) (Federal Republic of Yugoslavia) Zoran Savić	2	0	0	0	1
(United States) Nate Huffman	2	1 (FIBA SuproLeague)	0	0	0
(Spain) Jordi Villacampa	2	0	0	0	0

== See also ==
- All-EuroLeague Team
- EuroLeague Final Four MVP
- EuroLeague Final Four
- EuroLeague Awards
- EuroLeague Finals
- EuroLeague
