= EuroLeague Final Four MVP =

European basketball award

The EuroLeague Final Four Most Valuable Player Award is presented and awarded to the basketball player who has exhibited the most exceptional play during the EuroLeague Final Four. The award often goes to the best player on the European-wide top-tier level EuroLeague's best team. It is generally considered to be the most prestigious individual award in European professional club basketball.

The Final Four MVP award was first given at the end of the 1987–88 season, when the competition that would later become called EuroLeague, was then known as the FIBA European Champions Cup. Prior to the 1987–88 season, the Top Scorer of the EuroLeague Finals was noted. However, an actual MVP was not named until the first EuroLeague Final Four of the modern era was held.

== EuroLeague Finals Top Scorers (1958–1987) ==
From the 1958 to 1986–87 seasons, the Top Scorer of the EuroLeague Finals was noted, regardless of whether he played on the winning or losing team. However, there was no actual MVP award given.

== Voting criteria ==
From the 1988 EuroLeague Final Four through the 2016 EuroLeague Final Four, the voting for the EuroLeague Final Four MVP was done by the accredited media members in attendance. Starting with the 2017 EuroLeague Final Four, the voting for the award includes an online vote of fans as well.

== All-time EuroLeague Final Four MVP award winners (1988–present) ==
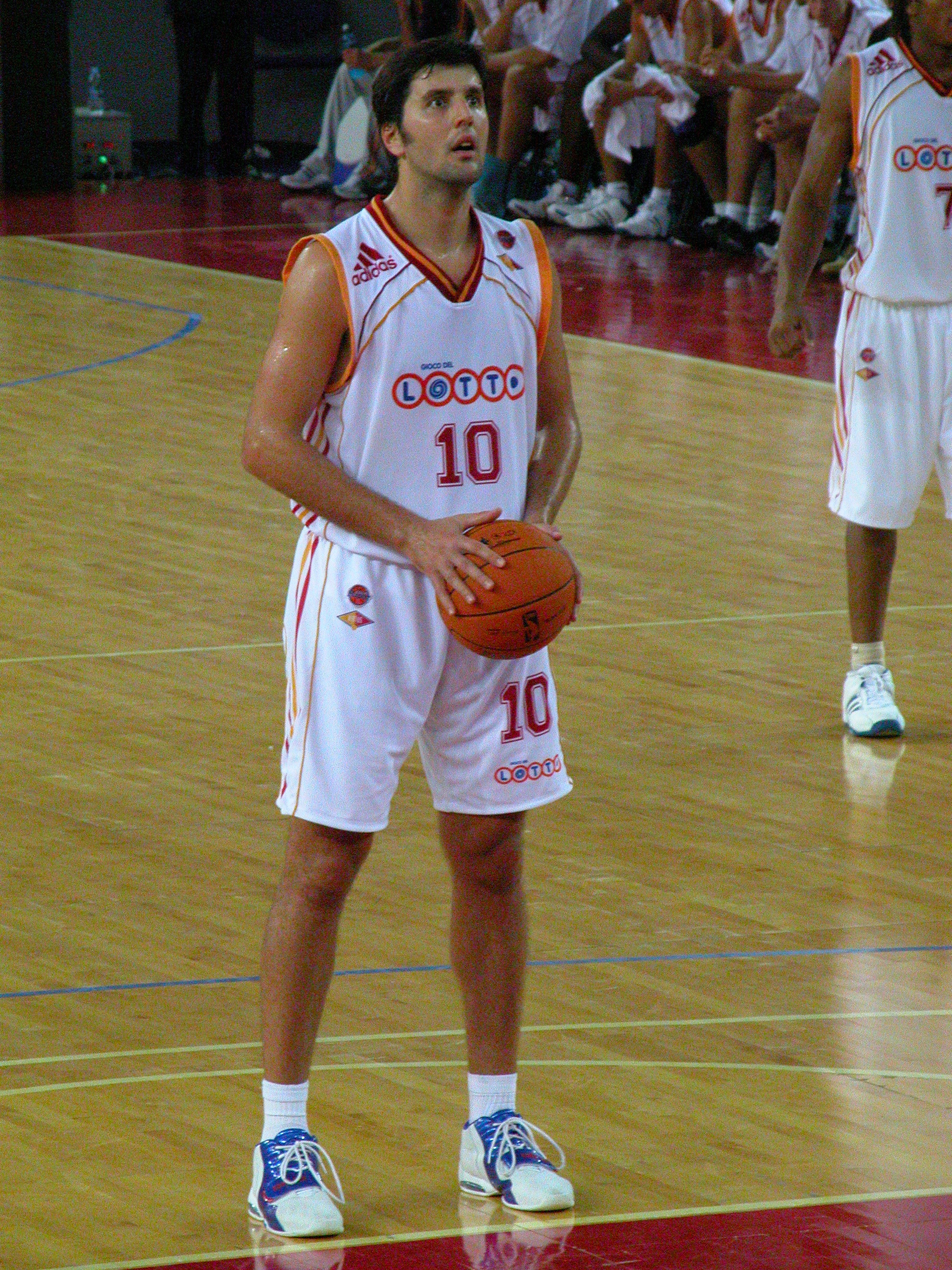
Dejan Bodiroga was the EuroLeague's Final Four MVP 2 times (2002, 2003).

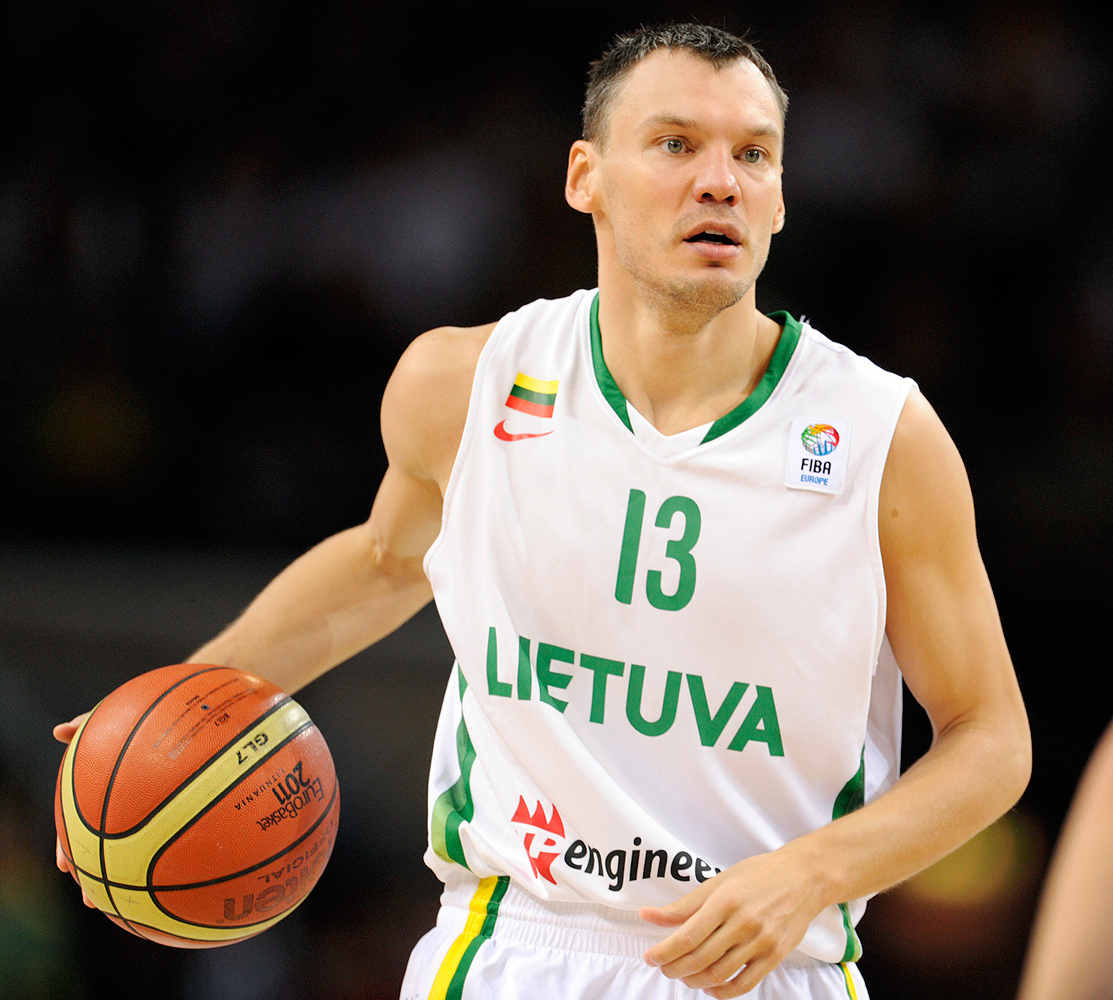
Šarūnas Jasikevičius was the EuroLeague's Final Four MVP in 2005.

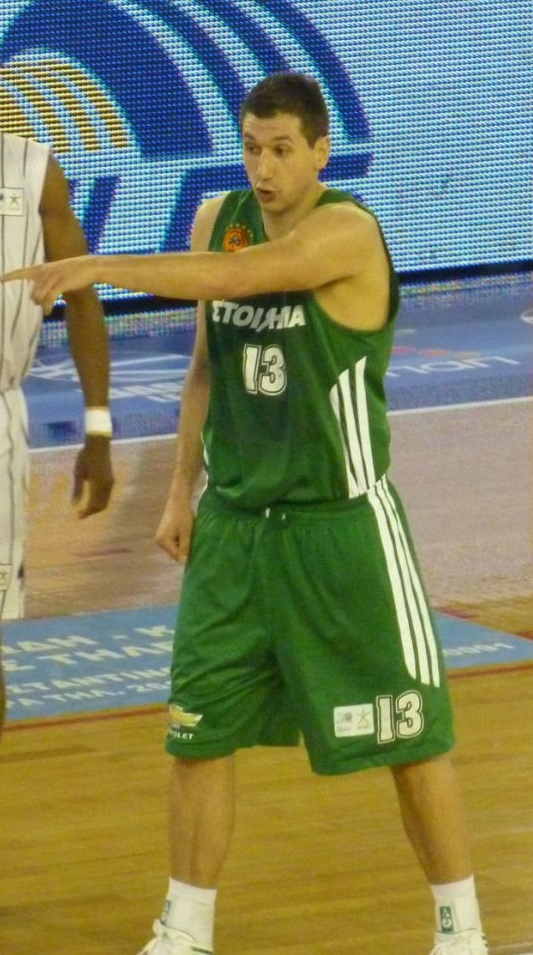
Dimitris Diamantidis was the EuroLeague's Final Four MVP 2 times (2007, 2011).

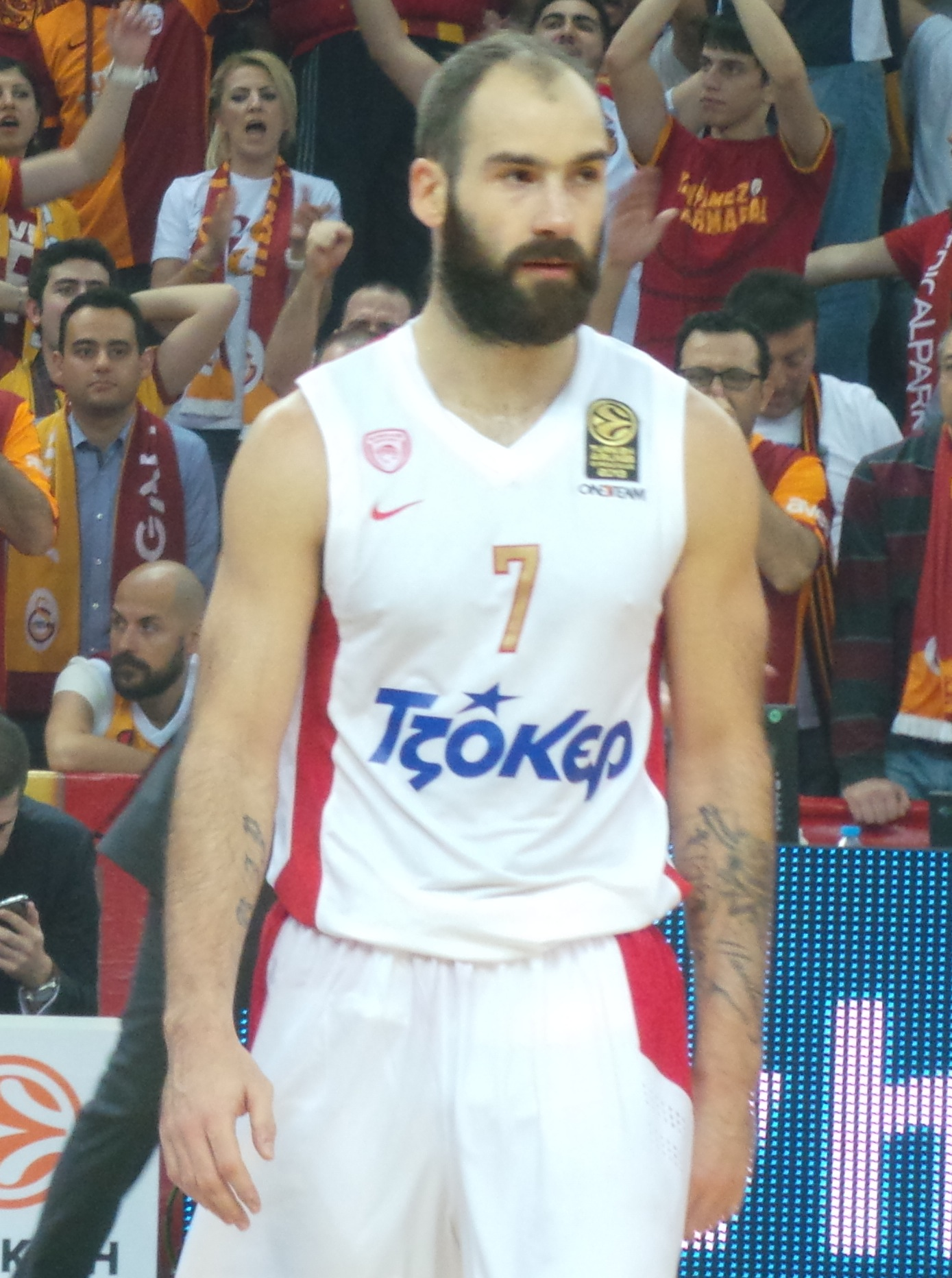
Vassilis Spanoulis was the EuroLeague's Final Four MVP 3 times (2009, 2012, 2013).

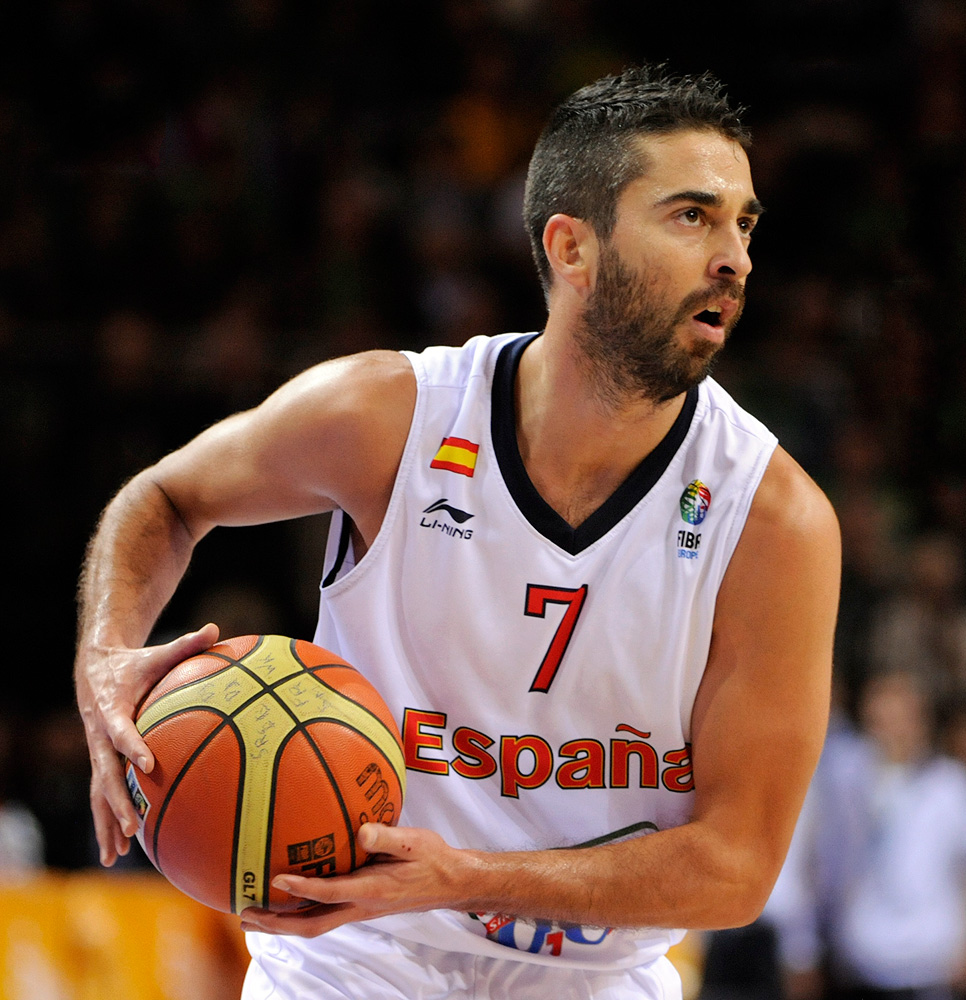
J.C. Navarro was the EuroLeague's Final Four MVP in 2010.

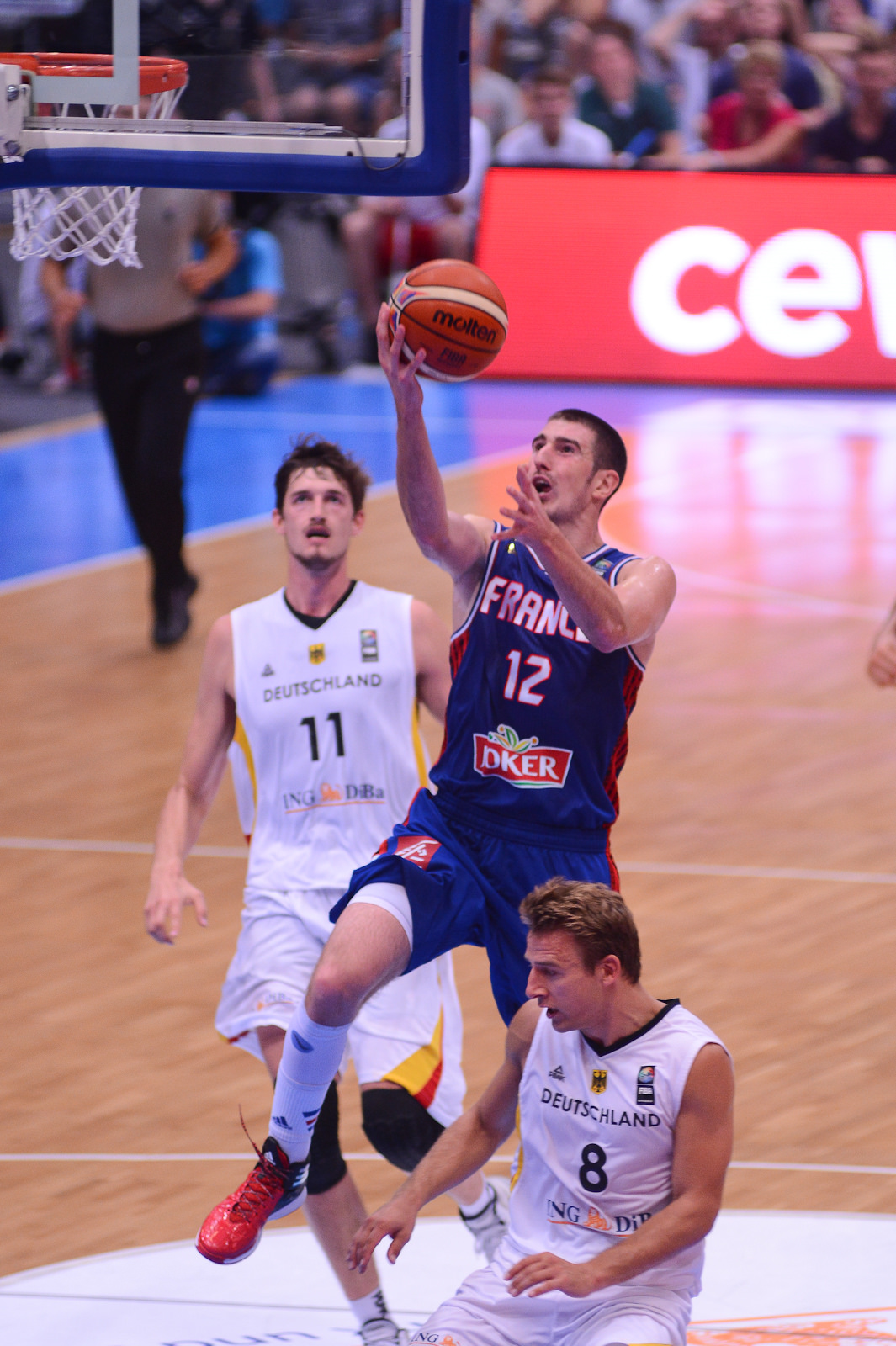
Nando de Colo (#12 in blue), was the EuroLeague's Final Four MVP in 2016.

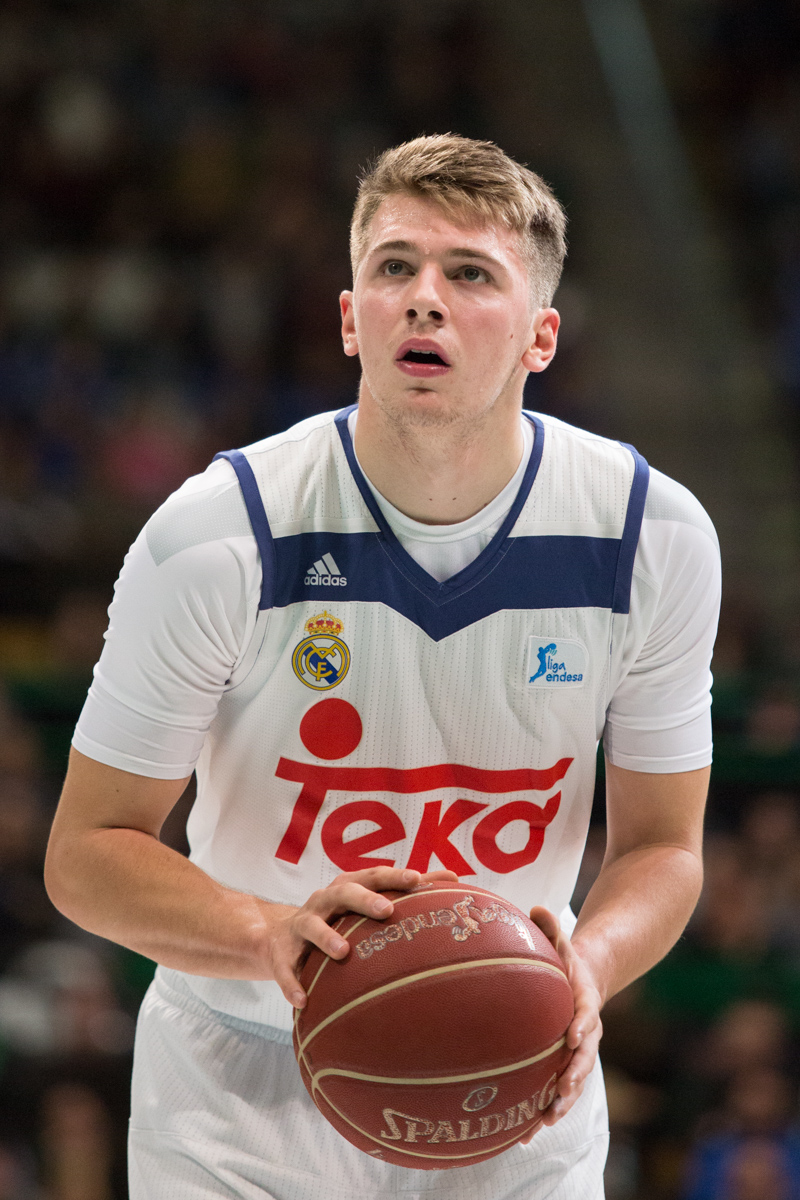
Luka Dončić was the EuroLeague's Final Four MVP in 2018.

Since the end of the 1987–88 season, when the first EuroLeague Final Four (1988 EuroLeague Final Four) was held, an MVP is named at the conclusion of each Final Four.

*	Member of the Naismith Memorial Basketball Hall of Fame
**	Member of the FIBA Hall of Fame
***	Member of both the Naismith and FIBA Halls of Fame

Season	Final Four MVP	Club	Ref.
1987–88	(United States) Bob McAdoo*	(Italy) Tracer Milano	
1988–89	(Socialist Federal Republic of Yugoslavia) Dino Rađja*	(Socialist Federal Republic of Yugoslavia) Jugoplastika	
1989–90	(Socialist Federal Republic of Yugoslavia) Toni Kukoč***	(Socialist Federal Republic of Yugoslavia) Jugoplastika	
1990–91	(Socialist Federal Republic of Yugoslavia) Toni Kukoč*** (2)	(Socialist Federal Republic of Yugoslavia) POP 84	
1991–92	(Socialist Federal Republic of Yugoslavia) Predrag Danilović	(Socialist Federal Republic of Yugoslavia) Partizan	
1992–93	(Croatia) Toni Kukoč*** (3)	(Italy) Benetton Treviso	
1993–94	(Federal Republic of Yugoslavia) Žarko Paspalj	(Greece) Olympiacos	
1994–95	(Lithuania) Arvydas Sabonis***	(Spain) Real Madrid Teka	
1995–96	(United States) Dominique Wilkins*	(Greece) Panathinaikos	
1996–97	(United States) David Rivers	(Greece) Olympiacos	
1997–98	(Federal Republic of Yugoslavia) Zoran Savić	(Italy) Kinder Bologna	
1998–99	(United States) Tyus Edney	(Lithuania) Žalgiris	
1999–00	(Federal Republic of Yugoslavia) Željko Rebrača	(Greece) Panathinaikos	
2000–01† (SuproLeague)	(United States) (Slovenia) Ariel McDonald	(Israel) Maccabi Elite Tel Aviv	
2000–01† (EuroLeague)	(Argentina) Manu Ginóbili*	(Italy) Kinder Bologna	
2001–02	(Federal Republic of Yugoslavia) Dejan Bodiroga	(Greece) Panathinaikos	
2002–03	(Serbia and Montenegro) Dejan Bodiroga (2)	(Spain) FC Barcelona	
2003–04	(United States) Anthony Parker	(Israel) Maccabi Elite Tel Aviv	
2004–05	(Lithuania) Šarūnas Jasikevičius	(Israel) Maccabi Elite Tel Aviv	
2005–06	(Greece) Theo Papaloukas	(Russia) CSKA Moscow	
2006–07	(Greece) Dimitris Diamantidis	(Greece) Panathinaikos	
2007–08	(United States) Trajan Langdon	(Russia) CSKA Moscow	
2008–09	(Greece) Vassilis Spanoulis	(Greece) Panathinaikos	
2009–10	(Spain) Juan Carlos Navarro	(Spain) Regal FC Barcelona	
2010–11	(Greece) Dimitris Diamantidis (2)	(Greece) Panathinaikos	
2011–12	(Greece) Vassilis Spanoulis (2)	(Greece) Olympiacos	
2012–13	(Greece) Vassilis Spanoulis (3)	(Greece) Olympiacos	
2013–14	(United States) (Montenegro) Tyrese Rice	(Israel) Maccabi Electra Tel Aviv	
2014–15	(Argentina) Andrés Nocioni	(Spain) Real Madrid	
2015–16	(France) Nando de Colo	(Russia) CSKA Moscow	
2016–17	(United States) (Nigeria) Ekpe Udoh	(Turkey) Fenerbahçe	
2017–18	(Slovenia) Luka Dončić	(Spain) Real Madrid	
2018–19	(United States) Will Clyburn	(Russia) CSKA Moscow	
2019–20	Not awarded ^{1}		
2020–21	(Serbia) Vasilije Micić	(Turkey) Anadolu Efes	
2021–22	(Serbia) Vasilije Micić (2)	(Turkey) Anadolu Efes	
2022–23	(Cape Verde) Edy Tavares	(Spain) Real Madrid	
2023–24	(Greece) Kostas Sloukas	(Greece) Panathinaikos	
2024–25	(United States) Nigel Hayes-Davis	(Turkey) Fenerbahçe Beko	
2025–26	(France) Evan Fournier	(Greece) Olympiacos	

Notes:

^1 There was no awarding in the 2019–20, because the season was cancelled due to the coronavirus pandemic in Europe.

† The 2000–01 season was a transition year, with the best European teams splitting into two different major leagues: The SuproLeague, held by FIBA, and the EuroLeague, held by Euroleague Basketball. That season's EuroLeague Basketball tournament did not end with a Final Four tournament. Instead, it ended with a 5-game playoff series. So, Manu Ginóbili was named the EuroLeague Finals MVP that season.

== Multiple honors ==
=== Players ===
Number	Player
3	(Socialist Federal Republic of Yugoslavia) (Croatia) Toni Kukoč
3	(Greece) Vassilis Spanoulis
2	(Federal Republic of Yugoslavia) (Serbia) Dejan Bodiroga
2	(Greece) Dimitris Diamantidis
2	(Serbia) Vasilije Micić
1	27 Players

NB:

- Kukoč won his first two awards in 1990 and 1991, as a citizen of SFR Yugoslavia; Croatia declared its independence on June 25, 1991, after that year's Champions Cup finals.
- Bodiroga won his first award in 2002, as a citizen of FR Yugoslavia. The country changed its name to Serbia and Montenegro in February 2003, three months before he won his second award; upon the dissolution of the latter state in 2006, he became a citizen of Serbia.

=== Player nationality ===
Number	Country
11×	United States
8×	Serbia
7×	Greece
3×	(Socialist Federal Republic of Yugoslavia) Yugoslavia
2×	Lithuania
2×	Argentina
2×	Slovenia
2×	France
1×	Cape Verde
1×	Croatia
1×	Spain
1×	Montenegro

NB:

- Players from the former Yugoslavia are classified by their nationality in one of the current post-Yugoslav states.
- Rice won his award in 2014, as a citizen of both the United States and Montenegro.
- Players from FR Yugoslavia classify as players from Serbia.

=== Teams ===
Number	Team
7	(Greece) Panathinaikos
5	(Greece) Olympiacos
4	(Russia) CSKA Moscow
4	(Israel) Maccabi Tel Aviv
4	(Spain) Real Madrid
3	(Socialist Federal Republic of Yugoslavia) Split
2	(Turkey) Anadolu Efes
2	(Spain) FC Barcelona
2	(Turkey) Fenerbahçe
2	(Italy) Virtus Bologna
1	4 Teams

== See also ==
- EuroLeague awards
- EuroLeague Final Four
- EuroLeague All-Final Four Team
- EuroLeague MVP
- EuroLeague Playoffs and Play-in MVP
- EuroLeague SuperCup MVP
- EuroLeague Player Of the Year, Group Stage MVP, and Top 16 Stage MVP
- 50 Greatest EuroLeague Contributors (2008)
- EuroLeague 2000–2010 All-Decade Team
- EuroLeague 2010–2020 All-Decade Team
- EuroLeague Legends
- EuroLeague 25th Anniversary Team
