= Zoran Savić =

Serbian basketball player (born 1966)

Personal information
- Born: November 18, 1966 (age 59) Zenica, SR Bosnia-Herzegovina, Yugoslavia
- Listed height: 2.06 m (6 ft 9 in)
- Listed weight: 120 kg (265 lb)

Career information
- NBA draft: 1988: undrafted
- Playing career: 1985–2002
- Position: Center

Career history
- 1985–1987: Čapljina Lasta
- 1987–1989: Čelik
- 1989–1991: Jugoplastika
- 1991–1993: FC Barcelona
- 1993–1995: PAOK Thessaloniki
- 1995–1996: Real Madrid
- 1996–1998: Virtus Bologna
- 1998–1999: Efes Pilsen
- 2000–2001: FC Barcelona
- 2001–2002: Fortitudo Bologna

Career highlights
- As player: 3× EuroLeague champion (1990, 1991, 1998); EuroLeague Final Four MVP (1998); FIBA Balkans Selection (1991 I); 2× FIBA EuroStar (1996, 1997); FIBA Korać Cup champion (1994); Spanish League champion (2001); Spanish Cup winner (2001); Italian League champion (1998); Italian Cup winner (1997); Greek Cup winner (1995); 2× Greek League All-Star (1994 I, 1994 II); Turkish Supercup winner (1998); 2× Yugoslav League champion (1990, 1991); 2× Yugoslav Cup winner (1990, 1991)
Medals
Men's basketball
Representing Yugoslavia
FIBA World Cup
Gold medal – first place	1990 Argentina	Team
EuroBasket
Gold medal – first place	1991 Italy	Team
Goodwill Games
Gold medal – first place	1990 Seattle
Representing (Federal Republic of Yugoslavia) FR Yugoslavia
Olympic Games
Silver medal – second place	1996 Atlanta	Team competition
EuroBasket
Gold medal – first place	1995 Greece	Team
Gold medal – first place	1997 Spain	Team

Zoran Savić (Serbian Cyrillic: Зоран Савић; born November 18, 1966) is a Serbian professional basketball executive and former professional player who last worked as the sports director for Partizan Belgrade of the Serbian KLS, the Adriatic League and the EuroLeague. The 2.06 m (6 ft 9 in) tall center played in various European countries throughout his career.

== Professional career ==
Savić made first career steps as a basketball player with Čelik in the First League of Yugoslavia. In 1990 and 1991, he played with Jugoplastika in Split, winning the Triple crown (both the Yugoslav league title, the Yugoslav Cup and the FIBA European Champions Cup (now known as the EuroLeague), in each of those two years. In 1991, he left Yugoslavia and Pop 84, and signed with FC Barcelona, where he spent a couple of seasons with them playing in Spain's Liga ACB. In 1993, he reached with FC Barcelona, the semifinals of the FIBA Korać Cup, where they were eliminated by Virtus Roma and Dino Rađa.

Savić then became a member of PAOK Bravo in Greece. With PAOK, he won the FIBA Korać Cup in 1994, against Stefanel Trieste, and the Greek Cup against Chipita Panionios, in 1995. He then spent a year with the Spanish club Real Madrid, before settling in Italy, with Kinder Bologna, in 1996.

With Kinder Bologna, he won the Italian Cup in 1997, and the Italian LBA League championship, as well as the EuroLeague, in 1998. He was awarded with the EuroLeague Final Four MVP award of the 1998 EuroLeague Final Four. In the summer of 1998, he moved to the Turkish club Efes Pilsen, of Istanbul, and with them he won the Turkish Supercup.

Savić then returned to FC Barcelona in 2000, and then moved to the Italian club Skipper Bologna in 2001. In 2002, he ended his professional basketball playing career.

== National team career ==
=== SFR Yugoslavia ===
Savić was a member of the senior SFR Yugoslav national team. With SFR Yugoslavia, he won a gold medal at the 1990 edition of the FIBA World Cup. He also won a gold medal at the 1991 edition of the FIBA EuroBasket.

=== FR Yugoslavia ===
Savić also represented the senior FR Yugoslav national team. As a member of FR Yugoslavia's national team, he won a gold medal at the 1995 EuroBasket. He was also a part of FR Yugoslavia's silver medal team at the 1996 Atlanta Summer Olympics.

Savić also won the gold medal at the 1997 EuroBasket.

== Post-playing career ==
After retiring from playing at Fortitudo Bologna in 2002, Savić became part of the club's management. He spent three years as the team's general manager. From 2005 until 2008, he was the general manager of FC Barcelona Bàsquet. From 2008 to 2009, he managed Fortitudo. Savić then became a sports agent, founding Invictus Sports Group.

On 16 March 2021, Partizan hired Savić as their new sports director.
