= EuroLeague Championship Game =

European club basketball competition finals

The EuroLeague Championship Game is the championship basketball final of the EuroLeague competition. The EuroLeague is the highest level tier, and most important professional competition of club basketball in Europe. Over the years, the EuroLeague's Championship Game, has also previously been known as the EuroLeague Final, the EuroLeague Finals, the EuroLeague Grand Final, and the EuroLeague Grand Finale.

Real Madrid have won the EuroLeague championship on 11 occasions, more than any other club, with its most recent victory coming in 2023. Olympiacos of Greece, is the current holder of the EuroLeague championship, as of 2026.

== Title holders ==
- ......1958 (Soviet Union) Rīgas ASK
- 1958–59 (Soviet Union) Rīgas ASK
- 1959–60 (Soviet Union) Rīgas ASK
- 1960–61 (Soviet Union) CSKA Moscow
- 1961–62 (Soviet Union) Dinamo Tbilisi
- 1962–63 (Soviet Union) CSKA Moscow
- 1963–64 (Spain) Real Madrid
- 1964–65 (Spain) Real Madrid
- 1965–66 (Italy) Simmenthal Milano
- 1966–67 (Spain) Real Madrid
- 1967–68 (Spain) Real Madrid
- 1968–69 (Soviet Union) CSKA Moscow
- 1969–70 (Italy) Ignis Varese
- 1970–71 (Soviet Union) CSKA Moscow
- 1971–72 (Italy) Ignis Varese
- 1972–73 (Italy) Ignis Varese
- 1973–74 (Spain) Real Madrid
- 1974–75 (Italy) Ignis Varese
- 1975–76 (Italy) Mobilgirgi Varese
- 1976–77 (Israel) Maccabi Elite Tel Aviv
- 1977–78 (Spain) Real Madrid
- 1978–79 (Socialist Federal Republic of Yugoslavia) Bosna
- 1979–80 (Spain) Real Madrid
- 1980–81 (Israel) Maccabi Elite Tel Aviv
- 1981–82 (Italy) Squibb Cantù
- 1982–83 (Italy) Ford Cantù
- 1983–84 (Italy) Banco di Roma
- 1984–85 (Socialist Federal Republic of Yugoslavia) Cibona
- 1985–86 (Socialist Federal Republic of Yugoslavia) Cibona
- 1986–87 (Italy) Tracer Milano
- 1987–88 (Italy) Tracer Milano
- 1988–89 (Socialist Federal Republic of Yugoslavia) Jugoplastika
- 1989–90 (Socialist Federal Republic of Yugoslavia) Jugoplastika
- 1990–91 (Socialist Federal Republic of Yugoslavia) POP 84
- 1991–92 (Socialist Federal Republic of Yugoslavia) Partizan
- 1992–93 (France) Limoges CSP
- 1993–94 (Spain) 7up Joventut
- 1994–95 (Spain) Real Madrid Teka
- 1995–96 (Greece) Panathinaikos
- 1996–97 (Greece) Olympiacos
- 1997–98 (Italy) Kinder Bologna
- 1998–99 (Lithuania) Žalgiris
- 1999–00 (Greece) Panathinaikos
- 2000–01 (Israel) Maccabi Elite Tel Aviv
- 2000–01 (Italy) Kinder Bologna
- 2001–02 (Greece) Panathinaikos
- 2002–03 (Spain) FC Barcelona
- 2003–04 (Israel) Maccabi Elite Tel Aviv
- 2004–05 (Israel) Maccabi Elite Tel Aviv
- 2005–06 (Russia) CSKA Moscow
- 2006–07 (Greece) Panathinaikos
- 2007–08 (Russia) CSKA Moscow
- 2008–09 (Greece) Panathinaikos
- 2009–10 (Spain) Regal FC Barcelona
- 2010–11 (Greece) Panathinaikos
- 2011–12 (Greece) Olympiacos
- 2012–13 (Greece) Olympiacos
- 2013–14 (Israel) Maccabi Electra Tel Aviv
- 2014–15 (Spain) Real Madrid
- 2015–16 (Russia) CSKA Moscow
- 2016–17 (Turkey) Fenerbahçe
- 2017–18 (Spain) Real Madrid
- 2018–19 (Russia) CSKA Moscow
- 2019–20 Cancelled due to COVID-19 pandemic
- 2020–21 (Turkey) Anadolu Efes
- 2021–22 (Turkey) Anadolu Efes
- 2022–23 (Spain) Real Madrid
- 2023–24 (Greece) Panathinaikos
- 2024–25 (Turkey) Fenerbahçe
- 2025–26 (Greece) Olympiacos

== EuroLeague Finals ==
For finals not played in a single game, an * precedes the score of the team playing at home.

Season	Host city	Champion	Runner-up	1st game / Final	2nd game	3rd game	4th game	5th game
1958; Details	Riga & Sofia	(Soviet Union) Rīgas ASK	(Bulgaria) Academic	*86–81	84–*71	–		
1958–59; Details	Riga & Sofia	(Soviet Union) Rīgas ASK	(Bulgaria) Academic	*79–58	69–*67	–		
1959–60; Details	Tbilisi & Riga	(Soviet Union) Rīgas ASK	(Soviet Union) Dinamo Tbilisi	61–*51	*69–62	–		
1960–61; Details	Moscow & Riga	(Soviet Union) CSKA Moscow	(Soviet Union) Rīgas ASK	*61–66	87–*62	–		
1961–62; Details	Geneva	(Soviet Union) Dinamo Tbilisi	(Spain) Real Madrid	90–83	–			
1962–63; Details	Madrid & Moscow	(Soviet Union) CSKA Moscow	(Spain) Real Madrid	69–*86	*91–74	*99–80	–	
1963–64; Details	Brno & Madrid	(Spain) Real Madrid	(Czechoslovakia) Spartak ZJŠ Brno	99–*110	*84–64	–		
1964–65; Details	Moscow & Madrid	(Spain) Real Madrid	(Soviet Union) CSKA Moscow	81–*88	*76–62	–		
1965–66; Details	Bologna	(Italy) Simmenthal Milano	(Czechoslovakia) Slavia VŠ Praha	77–72	–			
1966–67; Details	Madrid	(Spain) Real Madrid	(Italy) Simmenthal Milano	91–83	–			
1967–68; Details	Lyon	(Spain) Real Madrid	(Czechoslovakia) Spartak ZJŠ Brno	98–95	–			
1968–69; Details	Barcelona	(Soviet Union) CSKA Moscow	(Spain) Real Madrid	103–99 (2OT)	–			
1969–70; Details	Sarajevo	(Italy) Ignis Varese	(Soviet Union) CSKA Moscow	79–74	–			
1970–71; Details	Antwerp	(Soviet Union) CSKA Moscow	(Italy) Ignis Varese	67–53	–			
1971–72; Details	Tel Aviv	(Italy) Ignis Varese	(Socialist Federal Republic of Yugoslavia) Jugoplastika	70–69	–			
1972–73; Details	Liège	(Italy) Ignis Varese	(Soviet Union) CSKA Moscow	71–66	–			
1973–74; Details	Nantes	(Spain) Real Madrid	(Italy) Ignis Varese	84–82	–			
1974–75; Details	Antwerp	(Italy) Ignis Varese	(Spain) Real Madrid	79–66	–			
1975–76; Details	Geneva	(Italy) Mobilgirgi Varese	(Spain) Real Madrid	81–74	–			
1976–77; Details	Belgrade	(Israel) Maccabi Elite Tel Aviv	(Italy) Mobilgirgi Varese	78–77	–			
1977–78; Details	Munich	(Spain) Real Madrid	(Italy) Mobilgirgi Varese	75–67	–			
1978–79; Details	Grenoble	(Socialist Federal Republic of Yugoslavia) Bosna	(Italy) Emerson Varese	96–93	–			
1979–80; Details	West Berlin	(Spain) Real Madrid	(Israel) Maccabi Elite Tel Aviv	89–85	–			
1980–81; Details	Strasbourg	(Israel) Maccabi Elite Tel Aviv	(Italy) Sinudyne Bologna	80–79	–			
1981–82; Details	Cologne	(Italy) Squibb Cantù	(Israel) Maccabi Elite Tel Aviv	86–80	–			
1982–83; Details	Grenoble	(Italy) Ford Cantù	(Italy) Billy Milano	69–68	–			
1983–84; Details	Geneva	(Italy) Banco di Roma	(Spain) FC Barcelona	79–73	–			
1984–85; Details	Piraeus	(Socialist Federal Republic of Yugoslavia) Cibona	(Spain) Real Madrid	87–78	–			
1985–86; Details	Budapest	(Socialist Federal Republic of Yugoslavia) Cibona	(Soviet Union) Žalgiris	94–82	–			
1986–87; Details	Lausanne	(Italy) Tracer Milano	(Israel) Maccabi Elite Tel Aviv	71–69	–			
1987–88; Details	Ghent	(Italy) Tracer Milano	(Israel) Maccabi Elite Tel Aviv	90–84	–			
1988–89; Details	Munich	(Socialist Federal Republic of Yugoslavia) Jugoplastika	(Israel) Maccabi Elite Tel Aviv	75–69	–			
1989–90; Details	Zaragoza	(Socialist Federal Republic of Yugoslavia) Jugoplastika	(Spain) FC Barcelona Banca Catalana	72–67	–			
1990–91; Details	Paris	(Socialist Federal Republic of Yugoslavia) POP 84	(Spain) FC Barcelona Banca Catalana	70–65	–			
1991–92; Details	Istanbul	(Socialist Federal Republic of Yugoslavia) Partizan	(Spain) Montigalà Joventut	71–70	–			
1992–93; Details	Piraeus	(France) Limoges CSP	(Italy) Benetton Treviso	59–55	–			
1993–94; Details	Tel Aviv	(Spain) 7up Joventut	(Greece) Olympiacos	59–57	–			
1994–95; Details	Zaragoza	(Spain) Real Madrid Teka	(Greece) Olympiacos	73–61	–			
1995–96; Details	Paris	(Greece) Panathinaikos	(Spain) FC Barcelona Banca Catalana	67–66	–			
1996–97; Details	Rome	(Greece) Olympiacos	(Spain) FC Barcelona Banca Catalana	73–58	–			
1997–98; Details	Barcelona	(Italy) Kinder Bologna	(Greece) AEK	58–44	–			
1998–99; Details	Munich	(Lithuania) Žalgiris	(Italy) Kinder Bologna	82–74	–			
1999–00; Details	Thessaloniki	(Greece) Panathinaikos	(Israel) Maccabi Elite Tel Aviv	73–67	–			
2000–01 * Details; 2000–01 * Details	Paris	(Israel) Maccabi Elite Tel Aviv	(Greece) Panathinaikos	81–67	–			
2000–01 * Details; 2000–01 * Details	Bologna & Vitoria	(Italy) Kinder Bologna	(Spain) Tau Cerámica	*68–85	*94–73	80–*60	79–*96	*82–74
2001–02; Details	Bologna	(Greece) Panathinaikos	(Italy) Kinder Bologna	89–83	–			
2002–03; Details	Barcelona	(Spain) FC Barcelona	(Italy) Benetton Treviso	76–65	–			
2003–04; Details	Tel Aviv	(Israel) Maccabi Elite Tel Aviv	(Italy) Skipper Bologna	118–74	–			
2004–05; Details	Moscow	(Israel) Maccabi Elite Tel Aviv	(Spain) Tau Cerámica	90–78	–			
2005–06; Details	Prague	(Russia) CSKA Moscow	(Israel) Maccabi Elite Tel Aviv	73–69	–			
2006–07; Details	Athens	(Greece) Panathinaikos	(Russia) CSKA Moscow	93–91	–			
2007–08; Details	Madrid	(Russia) CSKA Moscow	(Israel) Maccabi Elite Tel Aviv	91–77	–			
2008–09; Details	Berlin	(Greece) Panathinaikos	(Russia) CSKA Moscow	73–71	–			
2009–10; Details	Paris	(Spain) Regal FC Barcelona	(Greece) Olympiacos	86–68	–			
2010–11; Details	Barcelona	(Greece) Panathinaikos	(Israel) Maccabi Electra Tel Aviv	78–70	–			
2011–12; Details	Istanbul	(Greece) Olympiacos	(Russia) CSKA Moscow	62–61	–			
2012–13; Details	London	(Greece) Olympiacos	(Spain) Real Madrid	100–88	–			
2013–14; Details	Milan	(Israel) Maccabi Electra Tel Aviv	(Spain) Real Madrid	98–86 (OT)	–			
2014–15; Details	Madrid	(Spain) Real Madrid	(Greece) Olympiacos	78–59	–			
2015–16; Details	Berlin	(Russia) CSKA Moscow	(Turkey) Fenerbahçe	101–96 (OT)	–			
2016–17; Details	Istanbul	(Turkey) Fenerbahçe	(Greece) Olympiacos	80–64	–			
2017–18; Details	Belgrade	(Spain) Real Madrid	(Turkey) Fenerbahçe	85–80	–			
2018–19; Details	Vitoria-Gasteiz	(Russia) CSKA Moscow	(Turkey) Anadolu Efes	91–83	–			
2019–20	Cologne	Cancelled due to COVID-19 pandemic						
2020–21; Details	Cologne	(Turkey) Anadolu Efes	(Spain) FC Barcelona	86–81	–			
2021–22; Details	Belgrade	(Turkey) Anadolu Efes	(Spain) Real Madrid	58–57	–			
2022–23; Details	Kaunas	(Spain) Real Madrid	(Greece) Olympiacos	79–78	–			
2023–24; Details	Berlin	(Greece) Panathinaikos	(Spain) Real Madrid	95–80	–			
2024–25; Details	Abu Dhabi	(Turkey) Fenerbahçe	(France) Monaco	81–70	–			
2025–26; Details	Athens	(Greece) Olympiacos	(Spain) Real Madrid	92–85	–			

* 2001 was a transition year, with the best European teams split into two major leagues, (SuproLeague, held by FIBA Europe, and Euroleague, held by Euroleague Basketball).

== Titles by club ==
Rank	Club	Titles	Runner-up	Champion years
1	(Spain) Real Madrid	11	11	1963–64, 1964–65, 1966–67, 1967–68, 1973–74, 1977–78, 1979–80, 1994–95, 2014–15, 2017–18, 2022–23
2	(Soviet Union) (Russia) CSKA Moscow	8	6	1960–61, 1962–63, 1968–69, 1970–71, 2005–06, 2007–08, 2015–16, 2018–19
3	(Greece) Panathinaikos	7	1	1995–96, 1999–00, 2001–02, 2006–07, 2008–09, 2010–11, 2023–24
4	(Israel) Maccabi Tel Aviv	6	9	1976–77, 1980–81, 2000–01, 2003–04, 2004–05, 2013–14
5	(Italy) Varese	5	5	1969–70, 1971–72, 1972–73, 1974–75, 1975–76
6	(Greece) Olympiacos	4	6	1996–97, 2011–12, 2012–13, 2025–26
7	(Italy) Olimpia Milano	3	2	1965–66, 1986–87, 1987–88
8	(Latvia) Rīgas ASK	3	1	1958, 1958–59, 1959–60
–	(Socialist Federal Republic of Yugoslavia) Split	3	1	1988–89, 1989–90, 1990–91
10	(Spain) FC Barcelona	2	6	2002–03, 2009–10
11	(Italy) Virtus Bologna	2	3	1997–98, 2000–01
12	(Turkey) Fenerbahçe	2	2	2016–17, 2024–25
13	(Turkey) Anadolu Efes	2	1	2020–21, 2021–22
14	(Italy) Cantù	2	–	1981–82, 1982–83
–	(Socialist Federal Republic of Yugoslavia) Cibona	2	–	1984–85, 1985–86
16	(Soviet Union) Dinamo Tbilisi	1	1	1961–62
–	(Spain) Joventut Badalona	1	1	1993–94
–	(Soviet Union) (Lithuania) Žalgiris	1	1	1998–99
19	(Socialist Federal Republic of Yugoslavia) Bosna	1	–	1978–79
–	(Italy) Virtus Roma	1	–	1983–84
–	(Socialist Federal Republic of Yugoslavia) Partizan	1	–	1991–92
–	(France) Limoges CSP	1	–	1992–93
23	(Bulgaria) Academic	–	2	–
–	(Czechoslovakia) Brno	–	2	–
–	(Italy) Treviso	–	2	–
–	(Spain) Baskonia	–	2	–
27	(Czechoslovakia) USK Praha	–	1	–
–	(Greece) AEK	–	1	–
–	(Italy) Fortitudo Bologna	–	1	–
–	(France) Monaco	–	1	–

== Titles by national domestic league ==
Rank	Country	League	Titles	Runners-up
1	Spain	LEB Primera División / Liga ACB	14	20
2	Italy	Lega Basket Serie A	13	13
3	Greece	Greek Basket League	11	8
4	Soviet Union	USSR Premier Basketball League	8	6
5	Yugoslavia	Yugoslav First Federal Basketball League	7	1
6	Israel	Israeli Basketball Premier League	6	9
7	Russia	Russian Professional Basketball Championship	4	3
	Turkey	Turkish Basketball Super League	4	3
9	France	LNB Pro A	1	1
10	Lithuania	Lithuanian Basketball League	1	0
11	Czechoslovakia	Czechoslovak Basketball League	0	3
12	Bulgaria	National Basketball League	0	2
Total			66	66

== Notes ==
^{a} 2001 was a transition year, with the best European teams split into two major leagues, SuproLeague, held by FIBA Europe and EuroLeague, held by Euroleague Basketball. The finals series of the latter:

Season	Home team	Score	Away team	Venue	Location
2000–01; Details	(Italy) Kinder Bologna	65–78	(Spain) Tau Cerámica	PalaMalaguti	Bologna, Italy
2000–01; Details	(Italy) Kinder Bologna	94–73	(Spain) Tau Cerámica	PalaMalaguti	Bologna, Italy
2000–01; Details	(Spain) Tau Cerámica	60–80	(Italy) Kinder Bologna	Fernando Buesa Arena	Vitoria, Spain
2000–01; Details	(Spain) Tau Cerámica	96–79	(Italy) Kinder Bologna	Fernando Buesa Arena	Vitoria, Spain
2000–01; Details	(Italy) Kinder Bologna	82–74	(Spain) Tau Cerámica	PalaMalaguti	Bologna, Italy
2000–01; Details	Kinder Bologna won 3–2				

== EuroLeague Finals Top Scorers, MVPs, and Champion coaches (1958 to present) ==
From 1958 to 1987, the Top Scorer of the EuroLeague Finals was noted, regardless of whether he played on the winning or losing team. However, there was no actual MVP award given. On the other hand, since the end of the 1987–88 season, when the first modern era EuroLeague Final Four was held, an MVP is named at the conclusion of each Final Four, at the end of the EuroLeague Final.

Bronze	Member of the FIBA Hall of Fame.
Silver	Member of the Naismith Memorial Basketball Hall of Fame.
Gold	Member of both the FIBA Hall of Fame and the Naismith Memorial Basketball Hall of Fame.
(X)	Denotes the number of times the player has been the Top Scorer, has won the MVP award, or the coach has won the championship.

Season	Top scorer	Team	Points Scored	MVP	Team	Champion Coach
1958	(Latvia) Jānis Krūmiņš	(Latvia) Rīgas ASK	22.5 average (2 games)	—N/a	—N/a	(Soviet Union) Alexander Gomelsky
1958–59	(Latvia) Jānis Krūmiņš (2×)	(Latvia) Rīgas ASK	28.0 average (2 games)	—N/a	—N/a	(Soviet Union) Alexander Gomelsky (2×)
1959–60	(Latvia) Jānis Krūmiņš (3×)	(Latvia) Rīgas ASK	21.5 average (2 games)	—N/a	—N/a	(Soviet Union) Alexander Gomelsky (3×)
1960–61	(Soviet Union) Viktor Zubkov	(Soviet Union) CSKA Moscow	21.5 average (2 games)	—N/a	—N/a	(Soviet Union) Evgeny Alekseev
1961–62	(United States) Wayne Hightower	(Spain) Real Madrid	30	—N/a	—N/a	(Soviet Union) Otar Korkia
1962–63	(Spain) Emiliano Rodríguez	(Spain) Real Madrid	21.0 average (3 games)	—N/a	—N/a	(Soviet Union) Evgeny Alekseev (2×)
1963–64	(Spain) Emiliano Rodríguez (2×)	(Spain) Real Madrid	29.5 average (2 games)	—N/a	—N/a	(Spain) Joaquín Hernández
1964–65	(United States) (Spain) Clifford Luyk	(Spain) Real Madrid	24.0 average (2 games)	—N/a	—N/a	(Spain) Pedro Ferrándiz
1965–66	(Czechoslovakia) Jiří Zídek Sr.	(Czechoslovakia) Slavia VŠ Praha	22	—N/a	—N/a	(Italy) Cesare Rubini
1966–67	(United States) Steve Chubin	(Italy) Simmenthal Milano	34	—N/a	—N/a	(Spain) Pedro Ferrándiz (2×)
1967–68	(United States) Miles Aiken	(Spain) Real Madrid	26	—N/a	—N/a	(Spain) Pedro Ferrándiz (3×)
1968–69	(Soviet Union) Vladimir Andreev	(Soviet Union) CSKA Moscow	37	—N/a	—N/a	(Soviet Union) Armenak Alachachian
1969–70	(Soviet Union) Sergey Belov	(Soviet Union) CSKA Moscow	21	—N/a	—N/a	(Socialist Federal Republic of Yugoslavia) Aca Nikolić
1970–71	(Soviet Union) Sergey Belov (2×)	(Soviet Union) CSKA Moscow	24	—N/a	—N/a	(Soviet Union) Alexander Gomelsky (4×)
1971–72	(Socialist Federal Republic of Yugoslavia) Petar Skansi	(Socialist Federal Republic of Yugoslavia) Jugoplastika	26	—N/a	—N/a	(Socialist Federal Republic of Yugoslavia) Aca Nikolić (2×)
1972–73	(Soviet Union) Sergey Belov (3×)	(Soviet Union) CSKA Moscow	36	—N/a	—N/a	(Socialist Federal Republic of Yugoslavia) Aca Nikolić (3×)
1973–74	(Italy) Dino Meneghin	(Italy) Ignis Varese	25	—N/a	—N/a	(Spain) Pedro Ferrándiz (4×)
1974–75	(United States) Bob Morse	(Italy) Ignis Varese	30	—N/a	—N/a	(Italy) Sandro Gamba
1975–76	(United States) Bob Morse (2×)	(Italy) Mobilgirgi Varese	28	—N/a	—N/a	(Italy) Sandro Gamba (2×)
1976–77	(United States) (Israel) Jim Boatwright	(Israel) Maccabi Elite Tel Aviv	26	—N/a	—N/a	(Israel) Ralph Klein
1977–78	(United States) Walter Szczerbiak Sr.	(Spain) Real Madrid	25	—N/a	—N/a	(Spain) Lolo Sainz
1978–79	(Socialist Federal Republic of Yugoslavia) Žarko Varajić	(Socialist Federal Republic of Yugoslavia) Bosna	47	—N/a	—N/a	(Socialist Federal Republic of Yugoslavia) Bogdan Tanjević
1979–80	(United States) (Israel) Earl Williams	(Israel) Maccabi Elite Tel Aviv	31	—N/a	—N/a	(Spain) Lolo Sainz (2×)
1980–81	(Italy) Marco Bonamico	(Italy) Sinudyne Bologna	26	—N/a	—N/a	(United States) Rudy D'Amico
1981–82	(United States) Bruce Flowers	(Italy) Squibb Cantù	23	—N/a	—N/a	(Italy) Valerio Bianchini
1982–83	(Italy) Antonello Riva	(Italy) Ford Cantù	20	—N/a	—N/a	(Italy) Giancarlo Primo
1983–84	(Spain) J.A. San Epifanio "Epi"	(Spain) FC Barcelona	31	—N/a	—N/a	(Italy) Valerio Bianchini (2×)
1984–85	(Socialist Federal Republic of Yugoslavia) Dražen Petrović	(Socialist Federal Republic of Yugoslavia) Cibona	36	—N/a	—N/a	(Socialist Federal Republic of Yugoslavia) Mirko Novosel
1985–86	(Soviet Union) Arvydas Sabonis	(Soviet Union) Žalgiris	27	—N/a	—N/a	(Socialist Federal Republic of Yugoslavia) Željko Pavličević
1986–87	(United States) Lee Johnson	(Israel) Maccabi Elite Tel Aviv	24	—N/a	—N/a	(United States) Dan Peterson
1987–88	(United States) Bob McAdoo	(Italy) Tracer Milano	25	(United States) Bob McAdoo	(Italy) Tracer Milano	(Italy) Franco Casalini
1988–89	(Israel) Doron Jamchi	(Israel) Maccabi Elite Tel Aviv	25	(Socialist Federal Republic of Yugoslavia) Dino Rađa	(Socialist Federal Republic of Yugoslavia) Jugoplastika	(Socialist Federal Republic of Yugoslavia) Božidar Maljković
1989–90	(Socialist Federal Republic of Yugoslavia) Toni Kukoč	(Socialist Federal Republic of Yugoslavia) Jugoplastika	20	(Socialist Federal Republic of Yugoslavia) Toni Kukoč	(Socialist Federal Republic of Yugoslavia) Jugoplastika	(Socialist Federal Republic of Yugoslavia) Božidar Maljković (2×)
1990–91	(Socialist Federal Republic of Yugoslavia) Zoran Savić	(Socialist Federal Republic of Yugoslavia) POP 84	27	(Socialist Federal Republic of Yugoslavia) Toni Kukoč (2x)	(Socialist Federal Republic of Yugoslavia) POP 84	(Socialist Federal Republic of Yugoslavia) Željko Pavličević (2×)
1991–92	(Socialist Federal Republic of Yugoslavia) Sasha Danilović	(Socialist Federal Republic of Yugoslavia) Partizan	25	(Socialist Federal Republic of Yugoslavia) Sasha Danilović	(Socialist Federal Republic of Yugoslavia) Partizan	(Socialist Federal Republic of Yugoslavia) Željko Obradović
1992–93	(United States) Terry Teagle	(Italy) Benetton Treviso	19	(Croatia) Toni Kukoč (3×)	(Italy) Benetton Treviso	(Federal Republic of Yugoslavia) Božidar Maljković (3×)
1993–94	(Spain) Ferran Martínez	(Spain) 7up Joventut	17	(Federal Republic of Yugoslavia) Žarko Paspalj	(Greece) Olympiacos	(Federal Republic of Yugoslavia) Željko Obradović (2×)
1994–95	(Lithuania) Arvydas Sabonis (2×)	(Spain) Real Madrid Teka	23	(Lithuania) Arvydas Sabonis	(Spain) Real Madrid Teka	(Federal Republic of Yugoslavia) Željko Obradović (3×)
1995–96	(Lithuania) Artūras Karnišovas	(Spain) FC Barcelona Banca Catalana	23	(United States) Dominique Wilkins	(Greece) Panathinaikos	(Federal Republic of Yugoslavia) Božidar Maljković (4×)
1996–97	(United States) David Rivers	(Greece) Olympiacos	26	(United States) David Rivers	(Greece) Olympiacos	(Federal Republic of Yugoslavia) Dušan Ivković
1997–98	(France) Antoine Rigaudeau	(Italy) Kinder Bologna	14	(Federal Republic of Yugoslavia) Zoran Savić	(Italy) Kinder Bologna	(Italy) Ettore Messina
1998–99	(France) Antoine Rigaudeau (2×)	(Italy) Kinder Bologna	27	(United States) Tyus Edney	(Lithuania) Žalgiris	(Lithuania) Jonas Kazlauskas
1999–00	(United States) Nate Huffman	(Israel) Maccabi Elite Tel Aviv	26	(Federal Republic of Yugoslavia) Željko Rebrača	(Greece) Panathinaikos	(Federal Republic of Yugoslavia) Željko Obradović (4×)
2000–01*	(Federal Republic of Yugoslavia) Dejan Bodiroga	(Greece) Panathinaikos	27	(United States) (Slovenia) Ariel McDonald	(Israel) Maccabi Elite Tel Aviv	(Israel) Pini Gershon
2000–01*	(Argentina) (Italy) Manu Ginóbili & (United States) Elmer Bennett & (United States) Victor Alexander	(Italy) Kinder Bologna & (Spain) Tau Cerámica	15.4 average (5 games)	(Argentina) (Italy) Manu Ginóbili	(Italy) Kinder Bologna	(Italy) Ettore Messina (2×)
2001–02	(Argentina) (Italy) Manu Ginóbili (2×)	(Italy) Kinder Bologna	27	(Federal Republic of Yugoslavia) Dejan Bodiroga	(Greece) Panathinaikos	(Federal Republic of Yugoslavia) Željko Obradović (5×)
2002–03	(Serbia and Montenegro) Dejan Bodiroga (2×)	(Spain) FC Barcelona	20	(Serbia and Montenegro) Dejan Bodiroga (2×)	(Spain) FC Barcelona	(Serbia and Montenegro) Svetislav Pešić
2003–04	(United States) Anthony Parker & (Serbia and Montenegro) Miloš Vujanić	(Israel) Maccabi Elite Tel Aviv & (Italy) Skipper Bologna	21	(United States) Anthony Parker	(Israel) Maccabi Elite Tel Aviv	(Israel) Pini Gershon (2×)
2004–05	(Lithuania) Šarūnas Jasikevičius	(Israel) Maccabi Elite Tel Aviv	22	(Lithuania) Šarūnas Jasikevičius	(Israel) Maccabi Elite Tel Aviv	(Israel) Pini Gershon (3×)
2005–06	(United States) Will Solomon	(Israel) Maccabi Elite Tel Aviv	20	(Greece) Theo Papaloukas	(Russia) CSKA Moscow	(Italy) Ettore Messina (3×)
2006–07	(Greece) Theo Papaloukas	(Russia) CSKA Moscow	23	(Greece) Dimitris Diamantidis	(Greece) Panathinaikos	(Serbia) Željko Obradović (6×)
2007–08	(United States) Will Bynum	(Israel) Maccabi Elite Tel Aviv	23	(United States) Trajan Langdon	(Russia) CSKA Moscow	(Italy) Ettore Messina (4×)
2008–09	(United States) (Russia) J.R. Holden	(Russia) CSKA Moscow	14	(Greece) Vassilis Spanoulis	(Greece) Panathinaikos	(Serbia) Željko Obradović (7×)
2009–10	(Spain) Juan Carlos Navarro	(Spain) Regal FC Barcelona	21	(Spain) Juan Carlos Navarro	(Spain) Regal FC Barcelona	(Spain) Xavi Pascual
2010–11	(United States) Mike Batiste	(Greece) Panathinaikos	18	(Greece) Dimitris Diamantidis (2×)	(Greece) Panathinaikos	(Serbia) Željko Obradović (8×)
2011–12	(Greece) Kostas Papanikolaou	(Greece) Olympiacos	18	(Greece) Vassilis Spanoulis (2×)	(Greece) Olympiacos	(Serbia) Dušan Ivković (2×)
2012–13	(Greece) Vassilis Spanoulis	(Greece) Olympiacos	22	(Greece) Vassilis Spanoulis (3×)	(Greece) Olympiacos	(Greece) Georgios Bartzokas
2013–14	(United States) (Montenegro) Tyrese Rice	(Israel) Maccabi Electra Tel Aviv	26	(United States) (Montenegro) Tyrese Rice	(Israel) Maccabi Electra Tel Aviv	(United States) (Israel) David Blatt
2014–15	(United States) (Belgium) Matt Lojeski	(Greece) Olympiacos	17	(Argentina) (Italy) Andrés Nocioni	(Spain) Real Madrid	(Spain) Pablo Laso
2015–16	(France) Nando de Colo	(Russia) CSKA Moscow	22	(France) Nando de Colo	(Russia) CSKA Moscow	(Greece) Dimitrios Itoudis
2016–17	(Serbia) Nikola Kalinić & (Serbia) Bogdan Bogdanović	(Turkey) Fenerbahçe (Turkey) Fenerbahçe	17	(United States) Ekpe Udoh	(Turkey) Fenerbahçe	(Serbia) Željko Obradović (9×)
2017–18	(Italy) Nicolò Melli	(Turkey) Fenerbahçe Doğuş	28	(Slovenia) Luka Dončić	(Spain) Real Madrid	(Spain) Pablo Laso (2×)
2018–19	(United States) (Turkey) Shane Larkin	(Turkey) Anadolu Efes	29	(United States) Will Clyburn	(Russia) CSKA Moscow	(Greece) Dimitrios Itoudis (2×)
2019–20	Cancelled due to COVID-19 pandemic					
2020–21	(Serbia) Vasilije Micić	(Turkey) Anadolu Efes	25	(Serbia) Vasilije Micić	(Turkey) Anadolu Efes	(Turkey) Ergin Ataman
2021–22	(Serbia) Vasilije Micić (2×)	(Turkey) Anadolu Efes	23	(Serbia) Vasilije Micić (2×)	(Turkey) Anadolu Efes	(Turkey) Ergin Ataman (2×)
2022–23	(Bulgaria) Aleksandar Vezenkov	(Greece) Olympiacos	29	(Cape Verde) Edy Tavares	(Spain) Real Madrid	(Spain) Chus Mateo
2023–24	(Greece) Kostas Sloukas	(Greece) Panathinaikos	24	(Greece) Kostas Sloukas	(Greece) Panathinaikos	(Turkey) Ergin Ataman (3×)
2024–25	(United States) Nigel Hayes-Davis	(Turkey) Fenerbahçe	23	(United States) Nigel Hayes-Davis	(Turkey) Fenerbahçe	(Lithuania) Šarūnas Jasikevičius
2025–26	(Canada) Trey Lyles	(Spain) Real Madrid	24	(France) Evan Fournier	(Greece) Olympiacos	(Greece) Georgios Bartzokas (2×)

* The 2000–01 season was a transition year, with the best European teams splitting into two different major leagues: The SuproLeague, held by FIBA Europe, and the EuroLeague, held by Euroleague Basketball.

== Multiple EuroLeague Finals Top Scorers ==
Number	Player
3	(Latvia) Jānis Krūmiņš
3	(Soviet Union) Sergey Belov
2	(Spain) Emiliano Rodríguez
2	(United States) Bob Morse
2	(Soviet Union) (Lithuania) Arvydas Sabonis
2	(France) Antoine Rigaudeau
2	(Argentina) (Italy) Manu Ginóbili
2	(Federal Republic of Yugoslavia) Dejan Bodiroga
2	(Serbia) Vasilije Micić

== Multiple EuroLeague Finals MVP award winners ==
Number	Player
3	(Socialist Federal Republic of Yugoslavia) (Croatia) Toni Kukoč
3	(Greece) Vassilis Spanoulis
2	(Federal Republic of Yugoslavia) Dejan Bodiroga
2	(Greece) Dimitris Diamantidis
2	(Serbia) Vasilije Micić

== Head coaches with the most finals appearances and players with the most championships ==
=== Finals appearances by head coach ===
Head coach	Championships Won	Finals Losses	Years In Finals (wins in bold)
(Socialist Federal Republic of Yugoslavia) (Federal Republic of Yugoslavia) (Serbia) Željko Obradović	**9***	3*	**1992, 1994, 1995, 2000**, 2001 FIBA SuproLeague*, **2002, 2007, 2009, 2011**, 2016, **2017**, 2018
(Italy) Ettore Messina	**4***	5*	**1998**, 1999, **2001 Euroleague Basketball***, 2002, 2003, **2006**, 2007, **2008**, 2009
(Spain) Pedro Ferrándiz	**4**	3	1962, **1965, 1967, 1968**, 1969, **1974**, 1975
(Soviet Union) (Russia) Alexander Gomelsky	**4**	2	**1958, 1959, 1960**, 1961, **1971**, 1973
(Socialist Federal Republic of Yugoslavia) (Federal Republic of Yugoslavia) Božidar Maljković	**4**	1	**1989, 1990**, 1991, **1993, 1996**
(Socialist Federal Republic of Yugoslavia) Aca Nikolić	**3**	2	**1970**, 1971, **1972, 1973**, 1981
(Israel) Pini Gershon	**3***	2*	2000, **2001 FIBA SuproLeague*, 2004, 2005**, 2006
(Turkey) Ergin Ataman	**3**	1	2019, **2021**, **2022**, **2024**
(Spain) Lolo Sainz	**2**	3	1976, **1978, 1980**, 1985, 1992
(Spain) Pablo Laso	**2**	3	2013, 2014, **2015, 2018**, 2022
(Italy) Sandro Gamba	**2**	2	1974, **1975, 1976**, 1977
(Soviet Union) Evgeny Alekseev	**2**	1	**1961, 1963**, 1965
(Greece) Georgios Bartzokas	**2**	1	**2013**, 2023, **2026**
(Italy) Valerio Bianchini	**2**	-	**1982, 1984**
(Socialist Federal Republic of Yugoslavia) Željko Pavličević	**2**	-	**1986, 1991**
(Federal Republic of Yugoslavia) (Serbia) Dušan Ivković	**2**	-	**1997, 2012**
(Greece) Dimitrios Itoudis	**2**	-	**2016, 2019**
(Israel) Ralph Klein	**1**	3	**1977**, 1980, 1982, 1988
(Soviet Union) Otar Korkia	**1**	1	1960, **1962**
(Spain) Joaquín Hernández	**1**	1	1963, **1964**
(Italy) Cesare Rubini	**1**	1	**1966**, 1967
(Soviet Union) Armenak Alachachian	**1**	1	**1969**, 1970
(United States) Dan Peterson	**1**	1	1983, **1987**
(Lithuania) Jonas Kazlauskas	**1**	1	**1999**, 2012
(United States) (Israel) David Blatt	**1**	1	2011, **2014**
(Spain) Chus Mateo	**1**	1	**2023**, 2024
(Lithuania) Šarūnas Jasikevičius	**1**	1	2021, **2025**
(Socialist Federal Republic of Yugoslavia) Bogdan Tanjević	**1**	-	**1979**
(United States) Rudy D'Amico	**1**	-	**1981**
(Italy) Giancarlo Primo	**1**	-	**1983**
(Socialist Federal Republic of Yugoslavia) Mirko Novosel	**1**	-	**1985**
(Italy) Franco Casalini	**1**	-	**1988**
(Serbia and Montenegro) Svetislav Pešić	**1**	-	**2003**
(Spain) Xavi Pascual	**1**	-	**2010**
(Israel) Zvi Sherf	0	3	1987, 1989, 2008
(Spain) Aito Garcia Reneses	0	3	1990, 1996, 1997
(Greece) Giannis Ioannidis	0	3	1994, 1995, 1998
(Bulgaria) Bozhidar Takev	0	2	1958, 1959
(Czechoslovakia) Ivo Mrázek	0	2	1964, 1968
(Montenegro) Duško Ivanović	0	2*	2001 Euroleague Basketball*, 2005
(Greece) Ioannis Sfairopoulos	0	2	2015, 2017
(Czechoslovakia) Jaroslav Šíp	0	1	1966
(Socialist Federal Republic of Yugoslavia) Branko Radović	0	1	1972
(Italy) Nico Messina	0	1	1978
(Italy) Edoardo "Dodo" Rusconi	0	1	1979
(Spain) Antoni Serra	0	1	1984
(Soviet Union) (Lithuania) Vladas Garastas	0	1	1986
(Croatia) Petar Skansi	0	1	1993
(Croatia) Jasmin Repeša	0	1	2004
(Greece) Panagiotis Giannakis	0	1	2010
(Greece) Vassilis Spanoulis	0	1	2025
(Italy) Sergio Scariolo	0	1	2026

* The 2000–01 season was a transition year, with the best European teams splitting into two different major leagues: The SuproLeague, held by FIBA Europe, and the EuroLeague, held by Euroleague Basketball.

=== Players with the most championships ===
Player	Championships Won	Finals Lost	Years Won
(Italy) Dino Meneghin	7	**6**	1970, 1972, 1973, 1975, 1976, 1987, 1988
(United States) (Spain) Clifford Luyk	6	**4**	1964, 1965, 1967, 1968, 1974, 1978
(Italy) Aldo Ossola	5	**5**	1970, 1972, 1973, 1975, 1976
(Greece) Fragiskos Alvertis	5	**1**	1996, 2000, 2002, 2007, 2009
(Italy) Ivan Bisson	4	**4**	1972, 1973, 1975, 1976
(Greece) Kostas Sloukas	4	**4**	2012, 2013, 2017, 2024
(United States) (Spain) Wayne Brabender	4	**3**	1968, 1974, 1978, 1980
(Spain) Cristóbal Rodríguez	4	**3**	1967, 1968, 1974, 1978
(Spain) Emiliano Rodríguez	4	**3**	1964, 1965, 1967, 1968
(Spain) Lolo Sainz	4	**3**	1964, 1965, 1967, 1968
(Spain) Carlos Sevillano	4	**3**	1964, 1965, 1967, 1968
(Italy) Marino Zanatta	4	**3**	1972, 1973, 1975, 1976
(Italy) Fausto Bargna	4	-	1982, 1983, 1987, 1988
(Lithuania) Šarūnas Jasikevičius	4	-	2003, 2004, 2005, 2009
(United States) Kyle Hines	4	-	2012, 2013, 2016, 2019

== Top scoring performances in EuroLeague Finals games ==
- The top scoring performances in EuroLeague Finals games:
1. (Socialist Federal Republic of Yugoslavia) Žarko Varajić (Bosna) 45 points vs. Emerson Varese (in 1978–79 Final)
2. (Soviet Union) Vladimir Andreev (CSKA Moscow) 37 points vs. Real Madrid (in 1968–69 Final)
3. (Socialist Federal Republic of Yugoslavia) Dražen Petrović (Cibona) 36 points vs. Real Madrid (in 1984–85 Final)
4. (Soviet Union) Sergei Belov (CSKA Moscow) 36 points vs. Ignis Varese (in 1972–73 Final)
5. (United States) Steve Chubin (Simmenthal Milano) 34 points vs. Real Madrid (in 1966–67 Final)
6. (Latvia) Jānis Krūmiņš (ASK Rīga) 32 points vs. Academic Sofija (in 1958 Final)
7. (Israel) Earl Williams (Maccabi Elite Tel Aviv) 31 points vs. Real Madrid (in 1979–80 Final)
8. (Spain) Emiliano Rodríguez (Real Madrid) 31 points vs. Spartak ZJŠ Brno (in first leg of 1963–64 Finals)
9. (Spain) Juan Antonio San Epifanio (FC Barcelona) 31 points vs. Banco di Roma (in 1983–84 Final)
10. (United States) Wayne Hightower (Real Madrid) 30 points vs. Dinamo Tbilisi (in 1961–62 Final)
11. (Socialist Federal Republic of Yugoslavia) Mirza Delibašić (Bosna) 30 points vs. Emerson Varese (in 1978–79 Final)
12. (Spain) Clifford Luyk (Real Madrid) 30 points vs. CSKA Moscow (in first leg of 1964–65 Finals)
13. (Czechoslovakia) František Konvička (Spartak ZJŠ Brno) 30 points vs. Real Madrid (in first leg of 1963–64 Finals)

== EuroLeague Finals attendance figures ==
Final	Total attendance	Average attendance (Number of Games)
FIBA Europe (1958–2001)
1958	34,300	17,150 (2 Games)
1959	37,000	18,500 (2 Games)
1960	17,000	17,000
1961	23,000	11,500 (2 Games)
1962	5,000	5,000
1963	45,000	15,000 (3 Games)
1964	16,400	8,200 (2 Games)
1965	20,000	10,000 (2 Games)
1966	8,000	8,000
1967	5,000	5,000
1968	8,000	8,000
1969	9,000	9,000
1970	6,500	6,500
1971	4,700	4,700
1972	9,444	9,444
1973	3,700	3,700
1974	5,000	5,000
1975	5,000	5,000
1976	7,000	7,000
1977	6,000	6,000
1978	5,000	5,000
1979	12,000	12,000
1980	8,513	8,513
1981	7,400	7,400
1982	8,000	8,000
1983	12,000	12,000
1984	10,000	10,000
1985	14,500	14,500
1986	12,500	12,500
1987	10,500	10,500
1988	9,000	9,000
1989	12,000	12,000
1990	11,000	11,000
1991	13,500	13,500
1992	12,000	12,000
1993	8,500	8,500
1994	8,000	8,000
1995	11,000	11,000
1996	12,500	12,500
1997	12,500	12,500
1998	11,900	11,900
1999	9,000	9,000
2000	8,500	8,500
2001 (FIBA SuproLeague)	13,200	13,200
Euroleague Basketball (2001–present)
2001 (EuroLeague)	40,983	8,197 (5 Games)
2002	8,278	8,278
2003	16,670	16,670
2004	10,000	10,000
2005	13,607	13,607
2006	16,805	16,805
2007	18,363	18,363
2008	13,480	13,480
2009	13,238	13,238
2010	14,768	14,768
2011	15,768	15,768
2012	15,550	15,550
2013	15,169	15,169
2014	11,843	11,843
2015	12,987	12,987
2016	12,250	12,250
2017	15,671	15,671
2018	16,967	16,967
2019	13,420	13,420
2020	Cancelled due to COVID-19 pandemic	
2021	Behind closed doors due to COVID-19 pandemic restrictions	
2022	15,000	15,000
2023	11,066	11,066
2024	13,578	13,578

== See also ==
- EuroLeague Final Four
- EuroLeague Final Four MVP
- EuroLeague Finals Top Scorer
- EuroLeague All-Final Four Team
- FIBA European Champions Cup and EuroLeague history
