= Kevin Magee (basketball) =

American basketball player

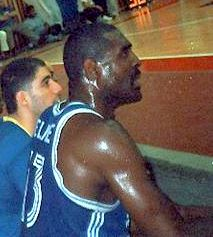
- Magee, in 1990

Personal information
- Born: January 24, 1959 Gary, Indiana, U.S.
- Died: October 23, 2003 (aged 44) Tangipahoa Parish, Louisiana, U.S.
- Listed height: 6 ft 8 in (2.03 m)
- Listed weight: 230 lb (104 kg)

Career information
- High school: South Pike (Magnolia, Mississippi)
- College: Saddleback College (1978–1980); UC Irvine (1980–1982)
- NBA draft: 1982: 2nd round, 39th overall pick
- Drafted by: Phoenix Suns
- Playing career: 1982–1994
- Position: Power forward / center
- Number: 13

Career history
- 1982–1983: Cagiva Varèse
- 1983–1984: CAI Zaragoza
- 1984–1990: Maccabi Tel Aviv
- 1990–1991: CAI Zaragoza
- 1991–1992: Auxilium Torino
- 1992–1993: Racing Paris
- 1993–1994: Maccabi Rishon LeZion

Career highlights
- Spanish Cup winner (1984); Italian League Top Scorer (1983); 2× Italian League Rebounding Leader (1983, 1992); 6× Israeli Premier League champion (1985–1990); 5× Israeli State Cup winner (1985–1987, 1989, 1990); 2× Israeli Premier League Top Scorer (1986, 1989); Israeli Premier League Rebounding Leader (1994); Consensus second-team All-American (1982); First-team All-American – AP (1981); 2× PCAA Player of the Year (1981, 1982); No. 44 retired by UC Irvine Anteaters

Career statistics
- Points: 2,081
- Stats at Basketball Reference

Kevin Dornell Magee (January 24, 1959 – October 23, 2003), was an American basketball player who played most of his professional career for Maccabi Tel Aviv. He played at the power forward and center positions. Magee played college basketball for the UCI Irvine Anteaters, earning All-American honors in both seasons. In 1993–94, he led the Israel Basketball Premier League in rebounds.

== College career ==
Magee went to Southeastern Louisiana University and then the University of Houston, but he was not ready for school, dropping out both times without playing basketball. He went to Saddleback College in Mission Viejo, California, before transferring to the University of California, Irvine, where he played two years for the Anteaters in the Pacific Coast Athletic Association (PCAA, now Big West Conference). A two-time All-American in the early 1980s, Magee was also the PCAA Player of the Year in 1980–81 and 1981–82. In those two seasons, he averaged 26.3 points and 12.3 rebounds per game along with a field goal percentage of 66%. He was a first-team All-PCAA and first-team All-District 8 both seasons, was named District 8 Most Valuable Player in 1982, and was ranked in the nation's top 10 in scoring, rebounding, and field-goal percentage both seasons. He was named a first-team All-American by the Associated Press in 1981, when he became the first player in NCAA history to finish in the top four in three statistical categories, finishing third in the country in scoring (27.5), second in field goal percentage (67.1) and fourth in rebounding (12.5). His was the first to have their number retired in UCI history, and he was inducted into the UCI Hall of Fame in 1997.

== Professional career ==
Magee was selected by the Phoenix Suns, in the 2nd round (39th overall) of the 1982 NBA draft; however he never played in the NBA.

He played in Europe, for Spanish side CAI Zaragoza, with whom he won Spanish King's Cup in 1984, and with them, he was also a FIBA Korać Cup semifinalist.

Later, he played for Maccabi Tel Aviv, winning with them 6 Israeli Premier League championships (1985–1990), and 5 Israeli State Cups (1985–1987, 1989, 1990). He was also a two-time EuroLeague semifinalist (1985, 1986), and a three-time Finalist (1987, 1988, 1989). At the peak of his career in Israel, he became a national sensation, being one of the first celebrities featured in advertisements. Most notable was his commercial for Telma peanut butter.

He rejoined CAI Zaragoza in 1991, and was a FIBA European Cup Winner's Cup Finalist, in the 1990–91 season.

While playing with Auxilium Torino of the Italian Lega Basket Serie A, he led the league in rebounding, in the 1991–92 season.

In 1993–94 he was the top rebounder in the Israel Basketball Premier League.

== Awards and accomplishments ==
=== Professional career ===
- Italian League Top Scorer: 1983
- 2× Italian League Rebounding Leader: 1983, 1992
- Spanish King's Cup Winner: 1984 (CAI Zaragoza)
- FIBA Korać Cup Semifinalist: 1984 (CAI Zaragoza)
- 6× Israeli Premier League Champion: 1985, 1986, 1987, 1988, 1989, 1990 (Maccabi Tel Aviv)
- 5× Israeli State Cup Winner: 1985, 1986, 1987, 1989, 1990 (Maccabi Tel Aviv)
- 2× Israeli Premier League Top Scorer (1986, 1989)
- 3× EuroLeague Finalist: 1987, 1988, 1989 (Maccabi Tel Aviv)
- 2× EuroLeague Semifinalist: 1985, 1986 (Maccabi Tel Aviv)
- FIBA European Cup Winner's Cup (FIBA Saporta Cup) Finalist: 1991 (CAI Zaragoza)
- Israeli Premier League Rebounding Leader (1994)

=== College career ===
- 2× PCAA Player of the Year: 1981, 1982
- AP's NCAA All-American First Team: 1981
- Consensus NCAA All-American Second Team: 1982
- Number 44 jersey retired by UC Irvine Anteaters: 1995

== Personal life ==
On October 23, 2003, Magee died at age 44, in a car accident on Interstate 55, south of Amite, Louisiana, returning home from his night shift as a warehouse supervisor.
