= Ken Barlow (basketball) =

American basketball player (born 1964)

Personal information
- Born: September 20, 1964 (age 62) Indianapolis, Indiana, U.S.
- Listed height: 6 ft 10 in (2.08 m)
- Listed weight: 250 lb (113 kg)

Career information
- High school: Cathedral (Indianapolis, Indiana)
- College: Notre Dame (1982–1986)
- NBA draft: 1986: 1st round, 23rd overall pick
- Drafted by: Los Angeles Lakers
- Playing career: 1986–2002
- Position: Power forward / center
- Number: 8

Career history
- 1986–1987: Olimpia Milano
- 1987–1990: Maccabi Tel Aviv
- 1990–1993: PAOK
- 1993–1994: Viola Reggio Calabria
- 1994: Benetton Treviso
- 1995–1996: Pistoia
- 1997–1999: Montecatini
- 1999–2000: Dinamo Sassari
- 2000–2002: Basket Livorno

Career highlights
- EuroLeague champion (1987); FIBA Saporta Cup champion (1991); Italian League champion (1987); Italian Cup winner (1987); Greek League champion (1992); Greek Cup Finals Top Scorer (1991); Greek League All-Star (1991); 3× Israeli League champion (1988–1990); 2× Israeli State Cup winner (1989, 1990); Second-team Parade All-American (1982); McDonald's All-American (1982)
- Stats at Basketball Reference

Kenneth Barlow (born September 20, 1964) is an American former professional basketball player. He played college basketball for the Notre Dame Fighting Irish.

== Early years ==
Barlow attended Cathedral High School. As a senior, he led the school to the state semifinal game and received All-American honors. He accepted a basketball scholarship from the University of Notre Dame in Notre Dame, Indiana.

As a sophomore in the 1983–84 season, he contributed along with point guard David Rivers, to a runner-up finish at the 1984 National Invitation Tournament (NIT).

He served as team captain his final two seasons while helping the Irish to two NCAA tournament berths in 1985 and 1986. As a senior, he received the school's Student Athlete of the Year award.

In 2019, he was inducted into the Indiana Basketball Hall of Fame.

== Professional career ==
Barlow was selected by the Los Angeles Lakers, in the first round (23rd overall) of the 1986 NBA draft. On June 16, he was traded along with shooting guard Mike McGee to the Atlanta Hawks, in exchange for the rights to small forward Billy Thompson and shooting guard Ron Kellogg.

On August 24, before the start of the Hawks training camp, he was driving a van in which former college teammate David Rivers was also traveling, returning to an apartment they shared after working a summer job with a caterer business, when the vehicle overturned and went into a ditch, after trying to avoid an oncoming car. Barlow had minor cuts, but Rivers suffered a life-threatening 15-inch abdominal cut, that he was able to recover from to play in 32 college games that season. On September 13, it was announced in the media, that he would play in Italy with the Tracer Milano instead of the NBA, where he averaged 16.9 points and 8.4 rebounds in 30 games.

In 1987, he played in Israel with the Maccabi Tel Aviv B.C. On December 14, he was traded to the Golden State Warriors in exchange for center Chris Washburn.

In 1988, he worked out with the Golden State Warriors in a mini-camp and in the Northwest Summer League. He returned to play in Europe, after head coach and general manager Don Nelson, encouraged him to keep improving his basketball skills.

He spent 16 years playing professionally in Europe, winning an Italian championship (1987), a FIBA European Champions Cup (1987), three Israeli championships (1988, 1989 and 1990) and a Greek championship (1992).

Some of the clubs that he played with in Europe include: Olimpia Milano, Maccabi Tel Aviv, PAOK, Pfizer Reggio Calabria, Benetton Treviso, Olimpia Pistoia, and Mabo Livorno.

== Personal life ==
Ken has two sons, who both played college basketball: Kelsey Barlow, who played at Purdue and UIC, and Keenan, who played for Indiana State and Tiffin. He also has a cousin, Ashley Barlow, who tri-captained the Notre Dame Fighting Irish women's basketball team in 2009 and 2010. She played for Notre Dame from 2007 to 2010.

Ken now works in Indianapolis at Cathedral High School

== Awards and accomplishments ==
- McDonald's All-American: (1982)
- EuroLeague Champion: (1987)
- 3× EuroLeague Finalist: (1987, 1988, 1989)
- Italian League Champion: (1987)
- Italian Cup Winner: (1987)
- 3× EuroLeague Final Four Participant: (1988, 1989, 1993)
- 3× Israeli League Champion: (1988, 1989, 1990)
- 2× Israeli State Cup Winner: (1989, 1990)
- Greek Cup Finals Top Scorer: (1991)
- FIBA European Cup (FIBA Saporta Cup) Champion: (1991)
- Greek League All-Star (1991)
- FIBA European Cup (FIBA Saporta Cup) Finalist: (1992)
- Greek League Champion: (1992)
