= Riccardo Pittis =

Italian basketball player

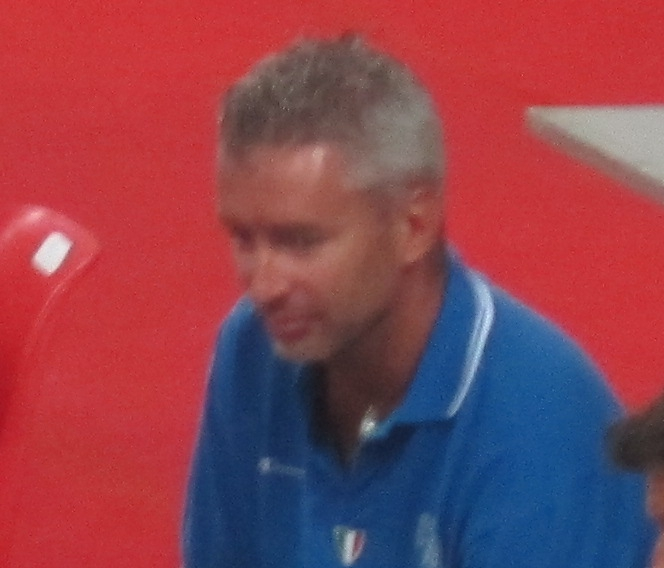

Personal information
- Born: 18 December 1968 (age 57) Milan, Italy
- Listed height: 6 ft 8 in (2.03 m)
- Listed weight: 216 lb (98 kg)

Career information
- Playing career: 1984–2004
- Position: Shooting guard / small forward
- Number: 7

Career history
- 1984–1993: Olimpia Milano
- 1993–2004: Benetton Treviso

Career highlights
- 2× EuroLeague champion (1987, 1988); 4× EuroLeague steals leader (1992, 1994, 1996, 2003); FIBA Intercontinental Cup champion (1987); 2× FIBA Saporta Cup champion (1995, 1999); 2× FIBA Korać Cup champion (1985, 1993); 7× Italian League champion (1985–1987, 1989, 1997, 2002, 2003); 7× Italian Cup winner (1986, 1987, 1994, 1995, 2000, 2003, 2004); 3× Italian Supercup winner (1997, 2001, 2002); 4x Italian All-Star (1991, 1996, 1997, 1999)

Riccardo Pittis (born 18 December 1968) is an Italian former professional basketball player. At a height of 2.03 m (6 ft 8 in) tall, he played at the small forward position. During his basketball playing career, he was nicknamed Acciughino (English: Anchovy). He was among the 105 player nominees for the 50 Greatest EuroLeague Contributors list.

== Professional career ==
During his pro club career, Pittis competed in the Italian League for two decades (1984–2004), playing in a total of 20 seasons. Pittis spent his whole club career playing with two teams: Olimpia Milano and Pallacanestro Treviso. With Olimpia, he won Europe's premiere basketball competition twice, as he won the EuroLeague championship with the club in 1987 and 1988. He also won the European-wide third level FIBA Korać Cup title in 1993 with Olimpia. With Benetton Treviso, he won the European-wide secondary level FIBA Saporta Cup title in 1995 and 1999.

Pittis led the EuroLeague in steals a total of 4 times (1992, 1994, 1996, and 2003). He finished his club playing career with 6,637 points scored and 1,811 steals, in 708 games played in the Italian League. His total of 1,811 career steals is the Italian League's all-time record. Pittis finished his EuroLeague career with 1,481 points scored and 420 steals, in 168 games played in 9 seasons.

== National team career ==
Pittis was a regular member of the senior Italian national team. With Italy's senior national team, he won two EuroBasket silver medals, at the 1991 EuroBasket and the 1997 EuroBasket. With Italy, he also played at the 1990 FIBA World Championship, the 1992 FIBA European Olympic Qualifying Tournament, the 1993 EuroBasket, and the 1995 EuroBasket. In total, he played in 118 games and scored 1,017 points, with Italy's senior national team.

== Post-playing career ==
After he finished his professional club basketball playing career, Pittis began working as a TV sports commentator for Sky Sport in 2005. In 2010, he became the Manager of the senior Italian national basketball team. In 2012, he became the General manager of Universo Treviso Basket.
