= Antonello Riva =

Italian basketball player

Personal information
- Born: February 28, 1962 (age 64) Rovagnate, Italy
- Listed height: 6 ft 5 in (1.96 m)
- Listed weight: 220 lb (100 kg)

Career information
- Playing career: 1977–2004, 2014
- Position: Shooting guard / small forward

Career history
- 1977–1989: Cantù
- 1989–1994: Olimpia Milano
- 1994–1996: V.L. Pesaro
- 1996–1998: Nuova Pallacanestro Gorizia
- 1998–2002: Cantù
- 2002–2004: NSB Rieti
- 2014: Leopandrillo Cantù

Career highlights
- FIBA Intercontinental Cup champion (1982); 2× EuroLeague champion (1982, 1983); 3× FIBA European Selection (1987, 1991 2×); 3× FIBA Saporta Cup champion (1978, 1979, 1981); FIBA Korać Cup champion (1993); Italian League champion (1981); Italian League all-time leading scorer; FIBA's 50 Greatest Players (1991); FIBA All-Time EuroStars Team (2007); 50 Greatest EuroLeague Contributors (2008)
Medals
Men's basketball
Representing Italy
FIBA EuroBasket
| Gold medal – first place | 1983 France |
| Silver medal – second place | 1991 Italy |
European Championship for Cadets
| Silver medal – second place | 1979 Syria | Under-16 Team |

Antonello Riva (born 28 February 1962) is an Italian former professional basketball player. At 1.96 m (6 ft 5 in), he played at the shooting guard and small forward positions. During his playing career, he was nicknamed "Nembo Kid" (Italian version of Superman). Riva was named one of FIBA's 50 Greatest Players in 1991. In 2004, he was given an award to mark his being the top scorer of all-time in the top two Italian club league competitions. He is also the all-time leading scorer in the history of the senior men's Italian national team. He was named to the FIBA All-Time EuroStars Team in 2007. In 2008, he was named one of the 50 Greatest EuroLeague Contributors.

== Professional career ==
Riva started playing pro club basketball in the 1977–78 season. He played most of his career with Cantù (1977–1989, 1998–2002), with whom he won the FIBA European Champions Cup (now called EuroLeague) twice, in the seasons 1981–82 and 1982–83. He also won an Italian League championship in 1981.

He also played with Olimpia Milano (1989–1994, with whom he won the FIBA Korać Cup in the 1992–93 season), Victoria Libertas Pesaro (1994–1996), Dinamica Gorizia (Italian 2nd Division, 1996–1998), and Sebastiani Rieti (Italian 2nd Division, 2004).

Riva finished his club playing career with a total of 14,397 points scored in 797 games played in Italian league competitions, the most all-time, for a career scoring average of 18.1 points per game. He also scored a total of 2,066 points in 97 EuroLeague games, for a career scoring average of 21.3 points per game.

== National team career ==
Riva was a member of the senior Italian national team. He is the all-time leading scorer in the history of the senior men's Italian national team, with 3,785 points scored, in 213 games played, for a career scoring average of 17.8 points per game. With Italy, he played at the following major FIBA tournaments: the 1983 EuroBasket, the 1984 Summer Olympics, the 1986 FIBA World Championship, the 1987 EuroBasket, the 1989 EuroBasket, the 1990 FIBA World Championship, and the 1991 EuroBasket.

He also won a gold medal at 1983 EuroBasket, and a silver medal at 1991 EuroBasket.

== Post-playing career ==
Riva founded a new basketball team in 2002. He won a career trophy for being the best scorer of all-time, of the top two level Italian leagues, with 14,397 total points scored, in 2004.
