= Doron Jamchi =

Israeli basketball player (born 1961)

Doron Jamchi דורון ג'מצ'י
- Jamchi in October 2026

Personal information
- Born: July 1, 1961 (age 65) Petah Tikva, Israel
- Listed height: 6 ft 6 in (1.98 m)
- Listed weight: 220 lb (100 kg)

Career information
- Playing career: 1978–2000
- Position: Shooting guard / small forward
- Number: 12

Career history
- 1978–1985: Ironi Ramat Gan
- 1985–1996: Maccabi Tel Aviv
- 1996–1999: Maccabi Rishon LeZion
- 1999–2000: Maccabi Tel Aviv

Career highlights
- 4× FIBA European Selection (1987, 1990, 1991, 1995); FIBA EuroBasket Top Scorer (1985); FIBA All-Time EuroStars Team (2007); 11× Israeli Premier League champion (1986–1992, 1994–1996, 2000); 7× Israeli State Cup winner (1986, 1987, 1989–1991, 1994, 2000); 2× Israeli Premier League Player of the Year (1983, 1985); 4× Israeli Premier League Top Scorer (1982, 1984, 1985, 1999); 3× All-Israeli Premier League First Team (1982, 1983, 1985); Israeli Premier League All-Time Leading Scorer; Maccabi Tel Aviv Hall of Fame (2011)

Career statistics
- Points: 15,487 (pro club career); 3,514 (Israeli NT); 19,001 (total)

Doron Jamchi, also spelled Jamchy (Hebrew: דורון ג'מצ'י; born July 1, 1961), is an Israeli former professional basketball player. At a height of 1.98 metres (6 ft 6 in), he played at the shooting guard and small forward positions. During his pro club career, Jamchi was a four-time FIBA European Selection, in the years 1987, 1990, 1991, and 1995. He was also a four-time Israeli Premier League Top Scorer, in the years 1982, 1984, 1985, and 1999. Widely considered to have been one of the best shooters in the history of European basketball, Jamchi is the all-time leading scorer in the history of the Israeli Premier League.

He is also the second most capped player in the history of the senior men's Israeli national team. Jamchi, who was the top scorer of the 1985 FIBA EuroBasket, is also the all-time leading scorer in the history of the senior Israeli national team. He was named to the FIBA All-Time EuroStars Team in 2007. In 2008, he was named the 16th Best Israeli Athlete of All Time, by The Jerusalem Post.

== Professional career ==
During his professional club career, Jamchi played with the Israeli clubs Ironi Ramat Gan, from 1978 to 1985, Maccabi Tel Aviv, where he first played from 1985 to 1996, and then later on, in 1999 to 2000 as well; and Maccabi Rishon Le Zion, where he played from 1996 to 1999. In his pro club career, he won a total of 11 Israeli Premier League championships (1986, 1987, 1988, 1989, 1990, 1991, 1992, 1994, 1995, 1996, and 2000), and 7 Israeli State Cups (1986, 1987, 1989, 1990, 1991, 1994, and 2000). He was the Israeli Premier League's top scorer a total of four times, in the years 1982, 1984, 1985, and 1999.

He is the all-time career leading scorer in the history of all Israeli top-tier level basketball club competitions, the Premier League, the State Cup, and the League Cup, with a total of 11,486 points scored. He is also the Israeli Premier League's all-time leading scorer, having scored a total of 9,611 points, in 466 games played. He also holds the all-time career record for the most 3-point field goals made in the Israeli Premier League, with 815. He is all the all-time leading scorer in the club history of Ironi Ramat Gan, with a total of 3,638 points scored, in 156 games played.

While playing for Maccabi Tel Aviv, Jamchi played in a total of four FIBA EuroLeague Final Fours, as he played at the 1988, 1989, 1991, and 2000 editions of the tournament. He was also a four-time FIBA EuroLeague Finalist, in the 1987, 1988, 1989, and 2000 editions of the tournament. On an individual level, Jamchi was a four-time member of the FIBA European Selection Team, in the years 1987, 1990, 1991, and 1995.

Jamchi scored a total of 4,001 points in games played in European-wide competitions, as he competed in both the European 3rd-tier level FIBA Korać Cup, and the European top-tier level FIBA EuroLeague. In games played just in the top level EuroLeague, he scored a total of 3,087 points, in 175 games played. Jamchi scored a total of 15,487 points during his pro club career, across all competitions.

== National team career ==
Jamchi has the second most caps of any player in the history of the senior men's Israeli national team, with a total of 189. Only Yaniv Green has more caps for Israel, with 193. He played with the Israeli national team at a total of six different FIBA EuroBasket tournaments: the 1981 EuroBasket, the 1983 EuroBasket, the 1985 EuroBasket, the 1987 EuroBasket, the 1993 EuroBasket, and the 1995 EuroBasket. At the 1985 EuroBasket, Jamchi was the tournament's top scorer, with a scoring average of 28.1 points per game, which placed him ahead of Dražen Petrović (25.1 per game) and Detlef Schrempf (24.4 per game).

He also played with Israel at the 1984 FIBA European Olympic Qualifying Tournament, the 1986 FIBA World Championship, and the 1988 FIBA European Olympic Qualifying Tournament. Jamchi is the all-time leading scorer in the history of the senior Israeli national team, with 3,514 total points scored.

== Personal life ==
Jamchi is married, and he has three daughters.

== See also ==
- Israeli Premier League Statistical Leaders
- List of select Jewish basketball players
