= Costas Rigas =

Greek basketball player and basketball referee

Personal information
- Born: 29 March 1944 (age 82) Athens, Greece
- Position: EuroLeague referee/ FIBA referee
- Officiating career: 1977–1992

Career highlights
- 50 Greatest EuroLeague Contributors (2008); FIBA Hall of Fame (2013)
- FIBA Hall of Fame

Costas Rigas (Greek: Κώστας Ρήγας, born 29 March 1944, in Greece), is a retired Greek pro basketball player, and a former pro basketball referee. Rigas is a member of the EuroLeague's 50 greatest contributors. In 2013, he was enshrined into the FIBA Hall of Fame.

== Playing career ==
Rigas played club basketball with Amyntas, in Greece. He also played with the youth national team of Greece, in one game.

== Reffing career ==
In 1977, Rigas became an international referee, and throughout his career, he refereed 23 title games. Highlights of his reffing career are the 1984 Summer Olympic Games final, the 1986 FIBA World Championship title game, the 1992 Summer Olympic Games women's final, four EuroLeague Finals (1984, 1985, 1986, 1991), and 4 Korać Cup title games.

Later, he was named the EuroLeague's director of referees.
