= 1968–69 FIBA European Champions Cup =

- League: FIBA European Champions Cup
- Sport: Basketball

Final
- Champions: (Soviet Union) CSKA Moscow (3rd title)
- Runners-up: (Spain) Real Madrid

FIBA European Champions Cup seasons
- ← 1967–68 1969–70 →

The 1968–69 FIBA European Champions Cup was the twelfth installment of the European top-tier level professional basketball club competition FIBA European Champions Cup (now called EuroLeague). The Final was held at Palau dels Esports, in Barcelona, Catalonia, Spain, on April 24, 1969, and it was won by CSKA Moscow, who defeated Real Madrid 103–99.

== Competition system ==
- 25 teams (European national domestic league champions, plus the then current title holders), playing in a tournament system, played knock-out rounds on a home and away basis. The aggregate score of both games decided the winner.
- The eight teams qualified for 1/4 Finals were divided into two groups of four. Every team played against the other three in its group in consecutive home-and-away matches, so that every two of these games counted as a single win or defeat (point difference being a decisive factor there). In case of a tie between two or more teams after the group stage, the following criteria were used to decide the final standings: 1) one-to-one games between the teams; 2) basket average; 3) individual wins and defeats.
- The group winners and runners-up of the 1/4 Finals round qualified for 1/2 Finals. The final was played at a predetermined venue.

== First round ==
Team 1	Agg.	Team 2	1st leg	2nd leg
Edinburgh Hornets (Scotland)	123–194	(France) ASVEL	76–81	47–113
Alvik (Sweden)	122–149	(West Germany) Gießen 46ers	60–61	62–88
Aldershot Warriors (England)	103–238	(Spain) Real Madrid	59–103	44–135
Tapion Honka (Finland)	158–180	(Belgium) Standard Liège	76–81	82–99
Black Star Mersch (Luxembourg)	104–221	(Italy) Oransoda Cantù	51–97	53–124
Flamingo's Haarlem (Netherlands)	113–170	(East Germany) Vorwärts Leipzig	70–75	43–95
Engelmann Wien (Austria)	145–160	(Romania) Dinamo București	88–75	57–85
İTÜ (Turkey)	147–139	(Poland) Wisła Kraków	91–70	56–69
Lourenço Marques (Portugal)	161–207	(Greece) AEK	77–89	84–118

== Second round ==
Team 1	Agg.	Team 2	1st leg	2nd leg
ASVEL (France)	141–142	(Socialist Federal Republic of Yugoslavia) Zadar	74–54	67–88
Gießen 46ers (West Germany)	152–199	(Spain) Real Madrid	81–97	71–102
Honvéd (Hungary)	146–163	(Belgium) Standard Liège	70–55	76–108
Partizani Tirana (Albania)	136–163	(Italy) Oransoda Cantù	73–73	63–90
Vorwärts Leipzig (East Germany)	126–141	(Soviet Union) CSKA Moscow	54–66	72–75
Dinamo București (Romania)	169–181	(Czechoslovakia) Spartak ZJŠ Brno	100–85	69–96
İTÜ (Turkey)	142–151	(Israel) Maccabi Tel Aviv	83–79	59–72
AEK (Greece)	127–134	(Bulgaria) Academic	73–58	54–76

== Quarterfinals group stage ==
The quarterfinals were played with a round-robin system, in which every Two Game series (TGS) constituted as one game for the record.

Key to colors
Top two places in each group advance to Semifinals

=== Group A ===
	Team	Pld	Pts	W	L	PF	PA	PD
1.	(Spain) Real Madrid	3	6	3	0	488	460	+28
2.	(Soviet Union) CSKA Moscow	3	5	2	1	471	416	+55
3.	(Socialist Federal Republic of Yugoslavia) Zadar	3	4	1	2	465	465	0
4.	(Bulgaria) Academic	3	3	0	3	455	538	-83

=== Group B ===
	Team	Pld	Pts	W	L	PF	PA	PD
1.	(Czechoslovakia) Spartak ZJŠ Brno	3	6	3	0	502	457	+45
2.	(Belgium) Standard Liège	3	5	2	1	488	508	-20
3.	(Italy) Oransoda Cantù	3	4	1	2	426	407	+19
4.	(Israel) Maccabi Tel Aviv	3	3	0	3	403	447	-44

== Semifinals ==
Team 1	Agg.	Team 2	1st leg	2nd leg
Real Madrid (Spain)	193–135	(Belgium) Standard Liège	84–46	109–89
CSKA Moscow (Soviet Union)	184–158	(Czechoslovakia) Spartak ZJŠ Brno	101–66	83–92

== Final ==
April 24, Palau dels Esports de Barcelona, Barcelona

Team 1	Score	Team 2
CSKA Moscow (Soviet Union)	103–99	(Spain) Real Madrid

1968–69 FIBA European Champions Cup
Champions

CSKA Moscow
3rd Title

== Awards ==
=== FIBA European Champions Cup Finals Top Scorer ===
- (Soviet Union) Vladimir Andreev ( (Soviet Union) CSKA Moscow)
