= 1970–71 FIBA European Champions Cup =

- League: FIBA European Champions Cup
- Sport: Basketball

Final
- Champions: (Soviet Union) CSKA Moscow (4th title)
- Runners-up: (Italy) Ignis Varese

FIBA European Champions Cup seasons
- ← 1969–70 1971–72 →

The 1970–71 FIBA European Champions Cup was the 14th installment of the European top-tier level professional basketball club competition FIBA European Champions Cup (now called EuroLeague). The Final was held at the Arena Deurne, in Antwerp, Belgium, on April 8, 1971. It was won by CSKA Moscow, who defeated Ignis Varese, by a result of 67–53.

== Competition system ==
- 27 teams (European national domestic league champions, plus the then current title holders), playing in a tournament system, played knock-out rounds on a home and away basis. The aggregate score of both games decided the winner.
- The eight teams qualified for the Quarterfinals were divided into two groups of four. Every team played against the other three in its group in consecutive home-and-away matches, so that every two of these games counted as a single win or defeat (point difference being a decisive factor there). In case of a tie between two or more teams after the group stage, the following criteria were used: 1) one-to-one games between the teams; 2) basket average; 3) individual wins and defeats.
- The group winners and the runners-up of the Quarterfinal Group Stage qualified for the Semifinals. The final was played at a predetermined venue.

== First round ==
Team 1	Agg.	Team 2	1st leg	2nd leg
Etzella (Luxembourg)	131–177	(West Germany) TuS 04 Leverkusen	72–99	59–78
Jeunesse Sportivo Alep (Syria)	137–201	(Bulgaria) Academic	69–89	68–112
Dinamo București (Romania)	195–157	(Austria) Union Firestone Ehgartner	115–56	80–101
İTÜ (Turkey)	-*	(Albania) Partizani Tirana		
Virum (Denmark)	105–259	(Czechoslovakia) Slavia VŠ Praha	63–113	42–146
Alvik (Sweden)	132–217	(Spain) Real Madrid	80–99	52–118
Tapion Honka (Finland)	127–144	(Poland) Śląsk Wrocław	66–66	61–78
Fiat Stars (Netherlands)	0–4**	(Socialist Federal Republic of Yugoslavia) AŠK Olimpija	0–2	0–2
ÍR (Iceland)	0–4**	(France) Olympique Antibes	0–2	0–2
FUS (Morocco)	124–179	(Greece) AEK	80–84	44–95
Benfica (Portugal)	133–230	(Hungary) Honvéd	67–112	66–118

*FIBA cancelled this match and declared İTÜ winner as Partizani Tirana refused to play in Turkey due to an outbreak of cholera in this country.

**Fiat Stars and ÍR withdrew before the first leg, so AŠK Olimpija and Olympique Antibes received a forfeit (2–0) in both their games.

== Second round ==
Team 1	Agg.	Team 2	1st leg	2nd leg
Ignis Varese (Italy)	162–119	(West Germany) TuS 04 Leverkusen	90–50	72–69
Standard Liège (Belgium)	169–160	(Israel) Maccabi Tel Aviv	107–86	62–74
Academic (Bulgaria)	176–146	(Romania) Dinamo București	82–56	94–90
İTÜ (Turkey)	154–169	(Czechoslovakia) Slavia VŠ Praha	77–66	77–103
Al-Zamalek (United Arab Republic)	127–174	(Spain) Real Madrid	73–87	54–87
Śląsk Wrocław (Poland)	154–163	(Socialist Federal Republic of Yugoslavia) AŠK Olimpija	60–74	94–89
Olympique Antibes (France)	158–152	(Greece) AEK	70–58	88–94
CSKA Moscow (Soviet Union)	195–139	(Hungary) Honvéd	102–72	93–67

== Quarterfinals group stage ==
The quarterfinals were played with a round-robin system, in which every Two Game series (TGS) constituted as one game for the record.

Key to colors
Top two places in each group advance to Semifinals

=== Group A ===
	Team	Pld	Pts	W	L	PF	PA	PD
1.	(Italy) Ignis Varese	3	6	3	0	515	426	+89
2.	(Czechoslovakia) Slavia VŠ Praha	3	5	2	1	506	508	-2
3.	(Socialist Federal Republic of Yugoslavia) AŠK Olimpija	3	4	1	2	451	470	-19
4.	(France) Olympique Antibes	3	3	0	3	461	529	-68

=== Group B ===
	Team	Pld	Pts	W	L	PF	PA	PD
1.	(Soviet Union) CSKA Moscow	3	6	3	0	512	417	+95
2.	(Spain) Real Madrid	3	5	2	1	474	433	+41
3.	(Bulgaria) Academic	3	4	1	2	509	495	+14
4.	(Belgium) Standard Liège	3	3	0	3	442	592	-150

== Semifinals ==
Team 1	Agg.	Team 2	1st leg	2nd leg
Ignis Varese (Italy)	148–133	(Spain) Real Madrid	82–59	66–74
Slavia VŠ Praha (Czechoslovakia)	150–162	(Soviet Union) CSKA Moscow	83–68	67–94

== Final ==
April 8, Arena Deurne, Antwerp

Team 1	Score	Team 2
CSKA Moscow (Soviet Union)	67–53	(Italy) Ignis Varese

1970–71 FIBA European Champions Cup
Champions

CSKA Moscow
4th Title

== Awards ==
=== FIBA European Champions Cup Finals Top Scorer ===
- (Soviet Union) Sergei Belov ( (Soviet Union) CSKA Moscow)
