= 1986–87 FIBA European Champions Cup =

- League: FIBA European Champions Cup
- Sport: Basketball

Final
- Champions: (Italy) Tracer Milano (2nd title)
- Runners-up: (Israel) Maccabi Elite Tel Aviv

FIBA European Champions Cup seasons
- ← 1985–86 1987–88 →

The 1986–87 FIBA European Champions Cup was the 30th edition of the FIBA European Champions Cup club competition (now called EuroLeague). The Final was held at the Centre Intercommunal de Glace de Malley in Lausanne, Switzerland, on April 2, 1987. It was won by Tracer Milano, who defeated Maccabi Elite Tel Aviv, by a result of 71–69.

== Competition system ==
- 26 teams (European national domestic league champions only), playing in a tournament system, played knock-out rounds on a home and away basis. The aggregate score of both games decided the winner.
- The six remaining teams after the knock-out rounds entered a Semifinal Group Stage, which was played as a round-robin. The final standing was based on individual wins and defeats. In the case of a tie between two or more teams after the group stage, the following criteria were used: 1) number of wins in one-to-one games between the teams; 2) basket average between the teams; 3) general basket average within the group.
- The winner and the runner-up of the Semifinal Group Stage qualified for the final, which was played at a predetermined venue.

== Preliminary round ==
Team 1	Agg.	Team 2	1st leg	2nd leg
Manchester United (England)	170-154	(Portugal) Benfica	91–67	79–87
Torpan Pojat (Finland)	166-157	(Hungary) Honvéd	96–80	70–77

== First round ==
Team 1	Agg.	Team 2	1st leg	2nd leg
Alvik (Sweden)	193-206	(Czechoslovakia) Zbrojovka Brno	95–110	98–96
Manchester United (England)	143-173	(Spain) Real Madrid	78–86	65–87
Torpan Pojat (Finland)	206-180	(Austria) Klosterneuburg	119–80	87–100
Pully (Switzerland)	203-226	(Israel) Maccabi Elite Tel Aviv	91–102	112–124
Bayer 04 Leverkusen (West Germany)	156-146	(Netherlands) Nashua EBBC	70–70	86–76
Partizani Tirana (Albania)	145-158	(France) Orthez	63–73	82–85
Aris (Greece)	240-154	(Belgium) Sunair Oostende	115–77	125–77
Murray Edinburgh (Scotland)	166-184	(Italy) Tracer Milano	83–83	83–101
Zagłębie Lubin (Poland)	171-172	(Turkey) Galatasaray	83–95	88–77
Steaua București (Romania)	169-215	(Soviet Union) Žalgiris	90–107	79–108
Achilleas (Cyprus)	124-230	(Bulgaria) Levski-Spartak	69–129	55–101
Sparta Bertrange (Luxembourg)	139-229	(Socialist Federal Republic of Yugoslavia) Zadar	68–116	71–113

== Second round ==
Team 1	Agg.	Team 2	1st leg	2nd leg
Zbrojovka Brno (Czechoslovakia)	161–214	(Spain) Real Madrid	70–82	91–132
Torpan Pojat (Finland)	175–207	(Israel) Maccabi Elite Tel Aviv	89–95	86–112
Bayer 04 Leverkusen (West Germany)	142–165	(France) Orthez	76–84	66–81
Aris (Greece)	147–150	(Italy) Tracer Milano	98–67	49–83
Galatasaray (Turkey)	142–182	(Soviet Union) Žalgiris	70-87	72–95
Levski-Spartak (Bulgaria)	177–191	(Socialist Federal Republic of Yugoslavia) Zadar	88–90	89–102

== Semifinal group stage ==
Key to colors
Top two places in the group advance to Final

	Team	Pld	Pts	W	L	PF	PA
1.	(Italy) Tracer Milano	10	17	7	3	870	814
2.	(Israel) Maccabi Elite Tel Aviv	10	17	7	3	861	820
3.	(France) Orthez	10	16	6	4	809	822
4.	(Socialist Federal Republic of Yugoslavia) Zadar	10	14	4	6	819	831
5.	(Soviet Union) Žalgiris	10	13	3	7	821	862
6.	(Spain) Real Madrid	10	13	3	7	862	893

== Final ==
April 2, Centre Intercommunal de Glace de Malley, Lausanne

Team 1	Score	Team 2
Tracer Milano (Italy)	71–69	(Israel) Maccabi Elite Tel Aviv

1986–87 FIBA European Champions Cup
Champions

Tracer Milano
2nd Title

== Awards ==
=== FIBA European Champions Cup Finals Top Scorer ===
- (United States) Lee Johnson ( (Israel) Maccabi Elite Tel Aviv)
