= 1962 FIBA European Champions Cup Final =

Dinamo Tbilisi (Soviet Union)	(Spain) Real Madrid
90	83
- Date: 29 June 1962
- Venue: Patinoire des Vernets, Geneva, Switzerland
- Referees: Erwin Kassai, Roger Weber
- Attendance: 5,000

== Match details ==
The 1962 FIBA European Champions Cup Final was a championship 1961–62 season EuroLeague Finals basketball game that was held in Patinoire des Vernets, Geneva, Switzerland, on the 29 June 1962, that saw Dinamo Tbilisi defeat Real Madrid, by a score 90-83, in front of 5,000 spectators, to claim its first, and to this day, only ever EuroLeague title. It was also the first title game that was ever decided by a single game that was played on a neutral court. Only one game on a neutral court was played, due to the unstable political situation that existed at the time.

== Box score ==
29 June 1962
21:30

Dinamo Tbilisi (Soviet Union)	90–83	(Spain) Real Madrid
Scoring by half: 38–36, 52–47
Pts: Altabaev 17		Pts: Hightower 30

Patinoire des Vernets, Geneva
Attendance: 5,000
Referees: Erwin Kassai (HUN), Roger Weber (SWI)

Dinamo Tbilisi	Real Madrid

Starters:			P
PG	6	(Soviet Union) Guram Minashvili	6
SG	9	(Soviet Union) Valeri Altabaev	17
F	12	(Soviet Union) Vladimir Ugrekhelidze	14
C	7	(Soviet Union) Ilarion Khazaradze	3
C	10	(Soviet Union) Anzor Lezhava	6
Reserves:			P
C	5	(Soviet Union) Levan Moseshvili	3
F	8	(Soviet Union) Revaz Gogelia	0
F	13	(Soviet Union) Alexandre Kiladze	14
C	14	(Soviet Union) Aleksandr Petrov	12
	16	(Soviet Union) Amiran Skhiereli	0
Head coach:
(Soviet Union) Otar Korkiya

1961–62 FIBA European Champions Cup
Champions

Dinamo Tbilisi
First title

Starters:			P
PG	8	(Spain) José Lluís	5
SG	11	(Spain) Carlos Sevillano	11
SF	10	(Spain) Emiliano Rodríguez	21
C	12	(United States) Wayne Hightower	30
C	13	(United States) Stan Morrison	5
Reserves:			P
PG	6	(Spain) Julio Descartín	0
F	7	(Spain) Lolo Sainz	4
C	14	(Spain) Lorenzo Alocén	0
Head coach:
(Spain) Pedro Ferrándiz

== Awards ==
=== FIBA European Champions Cup Finals Top Scorer ===
- (United States) Wayne Hightower ( (Spain) Real Madrid)

== See also ==
- FIBA European Champions Cup 1961–62

Preceded by two-legged Final	FIBA Champions Cup; Final 1962; Dinamo Tbilisi	Succeeded by two-legged Final
