= 1969–70 FIBA European Champions Cup =

- League: FIBA European Champions Cup
- Sport: Basketball

Final
- Champions: (Italy) Ignis Varese (1st title)
- Runners-up: (Soviet Union) CSKA Moscow

FIBA European Champions Cup seasons
- ← 1968–69 1970–71 →

The 1969–70 FIBA European Champions Cup was the thirteenth installment of the European top-tier level professional basketball club competition FIBA European Champions Cup (now called EuroLeague). The Final was held at the Sportska Dvorana Skenderija, in Sarajevo, Yugoslavia, on April 4, 1970. It was won by Ignis Varese, who defeated CSKA Moscow, by a result of 79–74.

== Competition system ==
- 24 teams (European national domestic league champions, plus the then current title holders), playing in a tournament system, played knock-out rounds on a home and away basis. The aggregate score of both games decided the winner.
- The eight teams qualified for 1/4 Finals were divided into two groups of four. Every team played against the other three in its group in consecutive home-and-away matches, so that every two of these games counted as a single win or defeat (point difference being a decisive factor there). In case of a tie between two or more teams after the group stage, the following criteria were used to decide the final standing: 1) one-to-one games between the teams; 2) basket average; 3) individual wins and defeats.
- The group winners and runners-up of the 1/4 Final round qualified for 1/2 Finals. The final was played at a predetermined venue.

== First round ==
Team 1	Agg.	Team 2	1st leg	2nd leg
Partizani Tirana (Albania)	141–165	(Romania) Dinamo București	65–70	76–95
Boroughmuir (Scotland)	204–267	(Belgium) Racing Bell Mechelen	84–123	120–144
Union Radès Transport (Tunisia)	0–4*	(France) ASVEL	0–2	0–2
Sporting (Portugal)	108–226	(Spain) Real Madrid	52–98	56–128
Osnabrück (West Germany)	133–180	(Hungary) Honvéd	74–88	59–92
Sparta Bertrange (Luxembourg)	176–241	(Socialist Federal Republic of Yugoslavia) Crvena zvezda	92–112	84–129
Engelmann Wien (Austria)	149–144	(Turkey) Galatasaray	100–74	49–70
Punch Delft (Netherlands)	158–159	(Poland) Legia Warsaw	74–80	84–79
Helsingborg (Sweden)	138–142	(Finland) Tapion Honka	73–67	65–75

*Union Radès Transport withdrew before the first leg and ASVEL received a forfeit (2–0) in both games.

== Second round ==
Team 1	Agg.	Team 2	1st leg	2nd leg
Dinamo București (Romania)	146–182	(Belgium) Racing Bell Mechelen	73–95	73–87
Hapoel Tel Aviv (Israel)	131–155	(France) ASVEL	70–69	61–86
Real Madrid (Spain)	163–161	(Hungary) Honvéd	95–76	68–85
Tapion Honka (Finland)	114–187	(Italy) Ignis Varese	59–88	55–99
Crvena zvezda (Socialist Federal Republic of Yugoslavia)	166–149	(Greece) Panathinaikos	91–66	75–83
Slavia VŠ Praha (Czechoslovakia)	199–147	(Austria) Engelmann Wien	106–68	93–79
Legia Warsaw (Poland)	157–159	(Bulgaria) Academic	91–80	66–79

Automatically qualified to the group stage

- (Soviet Union) CSKA Moscow (title holder)

== Quarterfinals group stage ==
The quarterfinals were played with a round-robin system, in which every Two Game series (TGS) constituted as one game for the record.

Key to colors
Top two places in each group advance to Semifinals

=== Group A ===
	Team	Pld	Pts	W	L	PF	PA	PD
1.	(Spain) Real Madrid	3	5	2	1	516	501	+15
2.	(Czechoslovakia) Slavia VŠ Praha	3	5	2	1	457	457	0
3.	(Belgium) Racing Bell Mechelen	3	4	1	2	446	440	+6
4.	(Bulgaria) Academic	3	4	1	2	452	473	-21

=== Group B ===
	Team	Pld	Pts	W	L	PF	PA	PD
1.	(Soviet Union) CSKA Moscow	3	6	3	0	540	472	+68
2.	(Italy) Ignis Varese	3	5	2	1	485	420	+65
3.	(France) ASVEL	3	4	1	2	448	529	-81
4.	(Socialist Federal Republic of Yugoslavia) Crvena zvezda	3	3	0	3	462	514	-52

== Semifinals ==
Team 1	Agg.	Team 2	1st leg	2nd leg
Real Madrid (Spain)	159–198	(Italy) Ignis Varese	86–90	73–108
Slavia VŠ Praha (Czechoslovakia)	154–220	(Soviet Union) CSKA Moscow	79–107	75–113

== Final ==
April 9, Sportska Dvorana Skenderija, Sarajevo

Team 1	Score	Team 2
Ignis Varese (Italy)	79–74	(Soviet Union) CSKA Moscow

1969–70 FIBA European Champions Cup
Champions

Ignis Varese
1st Title

== Awards ==
=== FIBA European Champions Cup Finals Top Scorer ===
- (Soviet Union) Sergei Belov ( (Soviet Union) CSKA Moscow)
