= 1980–81 FIBA European Champions Cup =

- League: FIBA European Champions Cup
- Sport: Basketball
- Duration: October 8, 1980 - March 26, 1981

Final
- Champions: (Israel) Maccabi Elite Tel Aviv (2nd title)
- Runners-up: (Italy) Sinudyne Bologna

FIBA European Champions Cup seasons
- ← 1979–80 1981–82 →

The 1980–81 FIBA European Champions Cup was the 24th season of the European top-tier level professional basketball club competition FIBA European Champions Cup (now called EuroLeague). The Final was held at the Hall Rhénus, in Strasbourg, France, on March 26, 1981. In a tightly contested game, Maccabi Elite Tel Aviv defeated Sinudyne Bologna, by a result of 80–79.

== Competition system ==
- Twenty-four teams (European national domestic league champions, plus the then current title holders), playing in a tournament system, entered a Quarterfinals group stage, divided into six groups that played in a round-robin. The final standing was based on individual wins and defeats. In the case of a tie between two or more teams after the group stage, the following criteria were used to decide the final classification:
1. number of wins in one-to-one games between the teams;
2. basket average between the teams;
3. general basket average within the group.
- The six group winners of the Quarterfinals group stage advanced to the Semifinals group stage, which was played as a single group under the same round-robin rules.
- The group winner and the runner-up of the Semifinals group stage qualified for the final, which was played at a predetermined venue.

== Quarterfinals group stage ==
Key to colors
Top place in each group advance to Semifinal group stage

=== Group A ===
	Team	Pld	Pts	W	L	PF	PA	PD
1.	(Spain) Real Madrid	6	12	6	0	682	452	+230
2.	(Switzerland) Viganello	6	9	3	3	545	561	-16
3.	(Egypt) Zamalek SC	6	8	2	4	463	618	-155
4.	(Portugal) FC Porto	6	7	1	5	483	542	-59

=== Group B ===
	Team	Pld	Pts	W	L	PF	PA	PD
1.	(Israel) Maccabi Elite Tel Aviv	6	10	4	2	531	471	+60
2.	(France) ASPO Tours	6	9	3	3	528	522	+6
3.	(Greece) Panathinaikos	6	9	3	3	519	543	-24
4.	(England) Sutton & Crystal Palace	6	8	2	4	524	566	-42

=== Group C ===
	Team	Pld	Pts	W	L	PF	PA	PD
1.	(Socialist Federal Republic of Yugoslavia) Bosna	6	11	5	1	614	475	+139
2.	(Hungary) Honvéd	6	10	4	2	587	517	+70
3.	(Austria) UBSC Wien	6	9	3	3	558	501	+57
4.	(Denmark) Stevnsgade	6	6	0	6	382	648	-266

=== Group D ===
	Team	Pld	Pts	W	L	PF	PA	PD
1.	(Italy) Sinudyne Bologna	6	12	6	0	594	461	+133
2.	(Bulgaria) CSKA Sofia	6	8	2	4	525	538	-13
3.	(Turkey) Eczacıbaşı	6	8	2	4	493	533	-40
4.	(Albania) Partizani Tirana	6	8	2	4	499	579	-80

=== Group E ===
	Team	Pld	Pts	W	L	PF	PA	PD
1.	(Netherlands) Nashua EBBC	6	11	5	1	574	466	+108
2.	(Scotland) Murray Edinburgh	6	10	4	2	467	478	-11
3.	(Czechoslovakia) Inter Slovnaft	6	9	3	3	504	524	-20
4.	(Sweden) Hageby	6	6	0	6	491	568	-77

=== Group F ===
	Team	Pld	Pts	W	L	PF	PA	PD
1.	(Soviet Union) CSKA Moscow	6	12	6	0	554	442	+112
2.	(Belgium) Maes Pils	6	9	3	3	472	509	-37
3.	(Poland) Śląsk Wrocław	6	8	2	4	542	557	-15
4.	(Finland) Pantterit	6	7	1	5	469	529	-60

== Semifinals group stage ==
Key to colors
Top two places in the group advance to Final

	Team	Pld	Pts	W	L	PF	PA	PD
1.	(Italy) Sinudyne Bologna	10	17	7	3	864	837	+27
2.	(Israel) Maccabi Elite Tel Aviv	10	16	6	4	903	880	+23
3.	(Netherlands) Nashua EBBC	10	15	5	5	902	901	+1
4.	(Socialist Federal Republic of Yugoslavia) Bosna	10	14	4	6	926	946	-20
5.	(Spain) Real Madrid	10	14	4	6	912	895	+17
6.	(Soviet Union) CSKA Moscow	10	14	4	6	813	861	-48

== Final ==
March 26, Hall Rhénus, Strasbourg

Team 1	Score	Team 2
Sinudyne Bologna (Italy)	79–80	(Israel) Maccabi Elite Tel Aviv

1980–81 FIBA European Champions Cup
Champions

Maccabi Elite Tel Aviv
2nd Title

== Awards ==
=== FIBA European Champions Cup Finals Top Scorer ===
- (Italy) Marco Bonamico ( (Italy) Sinudyne Bologna)
