= 1971–72 FIBA European Champions Cup =

- League: FIBA European Champions Cup
- Sport: Basketball

Final
- Champions: (Italy) Ignis Varese (2nd title)
- Runners-up: (Socialist Federal Republic of Yugoslavia) Jugoplastika

FIBA European Champions Cup seasons
- ← 1970–71 1972–73 →

The 1971–72 FIBA European Champions Cup was the 15th installment of the European top-tier level professional basketball club competition FIBA European Champions Cup (now called EuroLeague). The Final was held at the Yad Eliyahu Arena, in Tel Aviv, Israel, on March 23, 1972. It was won by Ignis Varese, who defeated Jugoplastika, by a result of 70–69.

== Competition system ==
- 23 teams (European national domestic league champions, plus the then current title holders), playing in a tournament system, played knock-out rounds on a home and away basis. The aggregate score of both games decided the winner.
- The 8 teams qualified for the Quarterfinals were divided into two groups of four. Every team played against the other three in its group in consecutive home-and-away matches, so that every two of these games counted as a single win or defeat (point difference being a decisive factor there). In case of a tie between two or more teams after this group stage, the following criteria were used: 1) one-to-one games between the teams; 2) basket average; 3) individual wins and defeats.
- The group winners and the runners-up of the Quarterfinal Group Stage qualified for the Semifinals. The final was played at a predetermined venue.

== First round ==
| Team 1 | Agg. | Team 2 | 1st leg | 2nd leg |
|---|---|---|---|---|
| Amicale Steinsel (Luxembourg) | 130–192 | (Greece) Panathinaikos | 63–98 | 67–94 |
| Tapion Honka (Finland) | 164–138 | (Sweden) Alvik | 73–60 | 91–78 |
| Jeunesse Sportivo Alep (Syria) | 0–4* | (Albania) 17 Nëntori | 0–2 | 0–2 |
| Al-Gezira (United Arab Republic) | 141–196 | (Socialist Federal Republic of Yugoslavia) Jugoplastika | 66–84 | 75–112 |
| İTÜ (Turkey) | 176–179 | (Austria) Radio Koch Wien | 91–84 | 85–95 |
| Lourenço Marques (Portugal) | 147–172 | (France) ASVEL | 72–77 | 75–95 |
| Virum (Denmark) | 90–234 | (Spain) Real Madrid | 43–120 | 47–114 |
| FUS (Morocco) | 124–179 | (Belgium) Bus Fruit Lier | 64–82 | 63–123 |

*Jeunesse Sportivo Alep withdrew before the first leg and 17 Nëntori received a forfeit (2–0) in both games.

== Second round ==
| Team 1 | Agg. | Team 2 | 1st leg | 2nd leg |
|---|---|---|---|---|
| Panathinaikos (Greece) | 161–154 | (Israel) Maccabi Elite Tel Aviv | 81–73 | 80–81 |
| Tapion Honka (Finland) | 153–188 | (Czechoslovakia) Slavia VŠ Praha | 80–87 | 73–101 |
| 17 Nëntori (Albania) | 135–175 | (Socialist Federal Republic of Yugoslavia) Jugoplastika | 77–90 | 58–85 |
| Radio Koch Wien (Austria) | 173–172 | (France) ASVEL | 101–85 | 72–87 |
| TuS 04 Leverkusen (West Germany) | 140–197 | (Spain) Real Madrid | 77–84 | 63–113 |
| Fribourg Olympic (Switzerland) | 127–209 | (Belgium) Bus Fruit Lier | 73–99 | 54–110 |
| Levi's Flamingo's (Netherlands) | –* | (Bulgaria) Academic | 92–94 | 92–105 |

*Academic qualified for the next stage of the competition as the winner of this match-up, but the Bulgarian club later withdrew alleging that most of their international players has been summoned to play a series of Communist Bloc tournaments (the real reason was to prepare the Pre-Olympic Tournament though). Later, FIBA fined Akademik for this intentional withdrawal and invited Levi's Flamingo's to take their place in the Quarter finals group stage.

Automatically qualified to the group stage

- (Italy) Ignis Varese (title holder)

== Quarterfinals group stage ==
The quarterfinals were played with a round-robin system, in which every Two Game series (TGS) constituted as one game for the record.

Key to colors
| Top two places in each group advance to Semifinals |

=== Group A ===
| | Team | Pld | Pts | W | L | PF | PA | PD |
|---|---|---|---|---|---|---|---|---|
| 1. | (Italy) Ignis Varese | 3 | 6 | 3 | 0 | 553 | 488 | +65 |
| 2. | (Spain) Real Madrid | 3 | 5 | 2 | 1 | 516 | 500 | +16 |
| 3. | (Austria) Radio Koch Wien | 3 | 4 | 1 | 2 | 499 | 559 | -60 |
| 4. | (Netherlands) Levi's Flamingo's | 3 | 3 | 0 | 3 | 541 | 562 | -21 |

=== Group B ===
| | Team | Pld | Pts | W | L | PF | PA | PD |
|---|---|---|---|---|---|---|---|---|
| 1. | (Socialist Federal Republic of Yugoslavia) Jugoplastika | 3 | 6 | 3 | 0 | 510 | 474 | +36 |
| 2. | (Greece) Panathinaikos | 3 | 4 | 1 | 2 | 484 | 489 | -5 |
| 3. | (Czechoslovakia) Slavia VŠ Praha | 3 | 4 | 1 | 2 | 484 | 506 | -22 |
| 4. | (Belgium) Bus Fruit Lier | 3 | 4 | 1 | 2 | 494 | 503 | -9 |

== Semifinals ==
| Team 1 | Agg. | Team 2 | 1st leg | 2nd leg |
|---|---|---|---|---|
| Ignis Varese (Italy) | 139–133 | (Greece) Panathinaikos | 69–55 | 70–78 |
| Real Madrid (Spain) | 158–161 | (Socialist Federal Republic of Yugoslavia) Jugoplastika | 89–81 | 69–80 |

== Final ==
March 23, Sports Palace at Yad Eliyahu, Tel Aviv

| Team 1 | Score | Team 2 |
|---|---|---|
| Ignis Varese (Italy) | 70–69 | (Socialist Federal Republic of Yugoslavia) Jugoplastika |

Ignis: Edoardo Rusconi, Ottorino Flaborea (13 pts), Graziano Malachin, Walter Vigna, Marino Zanatta (4), Paolo Vittori, Aldo Ossola (4), Dino Meneghin (21), Tony Gennari (8), Ivan Bisson, Manuel Raga (20).
Jugoplastika: Peterka, Grašo, Manović (5 pts), Grgin, D.Tvrdić, Macura, R.Tvrdić (8), L.Tvrdić (2), Šolman (20), Krstulović, Prug (8), Skansi (26).

1971–72 FIBA European Champions Cup
Champions

Ignis Varese
2nd Title

== Awards ==
=== FIBA European Champions Cup Finals Top Scorer ===
- (Socialist Federal Republic of Yugoslavia) Petar Skansi ( (Socialist Federal Republic of Yugoslavia) Jugoplastika)
