= 1979–80 FIBA European Champions Cup =

- League: FIBA European Champions Cup
- Sport: Basketball

Final
- Champions: (Spain) Real Madrid (7th title)
- Runners-up: (Israel) Maccabi Elite Tel Aviv

FIBA European Champions Cup seasons
- ← 1978–79 1980–81 →

The 1979–80 FIBA European Champions Cup was the 23rd season of the European top-tier level professional basketball club competition FIBA European Champions Cup (now called EuroLeague). The Final was held at the Deutschlandhalle, in West Berlin, on March 27, 1980. Real Madrid defeated Maccabi Elite Tel Aviv, by a result of 89–85.

== Competition system ==
- 22 teams (European national domestic league champions, plus the then current title holders), playing in a tournament system, entered a Quarterfinals group stage, divided into six groups that played a round-robin. The final standing was based on individual wins and defeats. In the case of a tie between two or more teams after the group stage, the following criteria were used to decide the final classification: 1) number of wins in one-to-one games between the teams; 2) basket average between the teams; 3) general basket average within the group
- The 6 group winners of the Quarterfinals group stage advanced to the Semifinals group stage, which was played as a single group under the same round-robin rules.
- The group winner and the runner-up of the Semifinals group stage qualified for the final, which was played at a predetermined venue.

== Quarterfinals group stage ==
Key to colors
| Top place in each group advance to Semifinal group stage |

=== Group A ===
| | Team | Pld | Pts | W | L | PF | PA | PD |
|---|---|---|---|---|---|---|---|---|
| 1. | (Socialist Federal Republic of Yugoslavia) Bosna | 4 | 7 | 3 | 1 | 387 | 335 | +52 |
| 2. | (Bulgaria) Levski-Spartak | 4 | 7 | 3 | 1 | 374 | 340 | +34 |
| 3. | (Egypt) Zamalek SC | 4 | 4 | 0 | 4 | 309 | 395 | -86 |

=== Group B ===
| | Team | Pld | Pts | W | L | PF | PA | PD |
|---|---|---|---|---|---|---|---|---|
| 1. | (Italy) Sinudyne Bologna | 4 | 8 | 4 | 0 | 364 | 263 | +101 |
| 2. | (Czechoslovakia) Inter Slovnaft | 4 | 6 | 2 | 2 | 374 | 344 | +30 |
| 3. | (Luxembourg) Sparta Bertrange | 4 | 4 | 0 | 4 | 255 | 386 | -131 |

=== Group C ===
| | Team | Pld | Pts | W | L | PF | PA | PD |
|---|---|---|---|---|---|---|---|---|
| 1. | (Spain) Real Madrid | 6 | 12 | 6 | 0 | 695 | 484 | +211 |
| 2. | (England) Sutton & Crystal Palace | 6 | 10 | 4 | 2 | 566 | 532 | +34 |
| 3. | (West Germany) TuS 04 Leverkusen | 6 | 8 | 2 | 4 | 543 | 561 | -18 |
| 4. | (Denmark) Stevnsgade | 6 | 6 | 0 | 6 | 366 | 593 | -227 |

=== Group D ===
| | Team | Pld | Pts | W | L | PF | PA | PD |
|---|---|---|---|---|---|---|---|---|
| 1. | (Israel) Maccabi Elite Tel Aviv | 6 | 11 | 5 | 1 | 588 | 429 | +159 |
| 2. | (Romania) Dinamo București | 6 | 9 | 3 | 3 | 482 | 461 | +21 |
| 3. | (Greece) Aris | 6 | 9 | 3 | 3 | 504 | 518 | -14 |
| 4. | (Turkey) Efes Pilsen | 6 | 7 | 1 | 5 | 398 | 564 | -166 |

=== Group E ===
| | Team | Pld | Pts | W | L | PF | PA | PD |
|---|---|---|---|---|---|---|---|---|
| 1. | (Socialist Federal Republic of Yugoslavia) Partizan | 6 | 11 | 5 | 1 | 632 | 514 | +118 |
| 2. | (Albania) Partizani Tirana | 6 | 10 | 4 | 2 | 563 | 578 | -15 |
| 3. | (Hungary) Honvéd | 6 | 8 | 2 | 4 | 576 | 581 | -5 |
| 4. | (Syria) Al-Ittihad Aleppo | 6 | 7 | 1 | 5 | 494 | 592 | -98 |

=== Group F ===
| | Team | Pld | Pts | W | L | PF | PA | PD |
|---|---|---|---|---|---|---|---|---|
| 1. | (Netherlands) Nashua EBBC | 6 | 9 | 3 | 3 | 523 | 450 | +73 |
| 2. | (Austria) UBSC Wien | 6 | 9 | 3 | 3 | 524 | 545 | -21 |
| 3. | (France) Moderne | 6 | 9 | 3 | 3 | 514 | 538 | -24 |
| 4. | (Belgium) Fresh Air | 6 | 9 | 3 | 3 | 540 | 568 | -28 |

== Semifinals group stage ==
Key to colors
| Top two places in the group advance to Final |

| | Team | Pld | Pts | W | L | PF | PA | PD |
|---|---|---|---|---|---|---|---|---|
| 1. | (Israel) Maccabi Elite Tel Aviv | 10 | 17 | 7 | 3 | 878 | 814 | +64 |
| 2. | (Spain) Real Madrid | 10 | 17 | 7 | 3 | 950 | 888 | +62 |
| 3. | (Socialist Federal Republic of Yugoslavia) Bosna | 10 | 16 | 6 | 4 | 868 | 867 | +1 |
| 4. | (Italy) Sinudyne Bologna | 10 | 15 | 5 | 5 | 831 | 841 | -10 |
| 5. | (Netherlands) Nashua EBBC | 10 | 14 | 4 | 6 | 786 | 775 | +11 |
| 6. | (Socialist Federal Republic of Yugoslavia) Partizan | 10 | 11 | 1 | 9 | 810 | 938 | -128 |

== Final ==
March 27, Deutschlandhalle, West Berlin

| Team 1 | Score | Team 2 |
|---|---|---|
| Maccabi Elite Tel Aviv (Israel) | 85–89 | (Spain) Real Madrid |

1979–80 FIBA European Champions Cup
Champions

Real Madrid
7th Title

== Awards ==
=== FIBA European Champions Cup Finals Top Scorer ===
- (Israel) Earl Williams ( (Israel) Maccabi Elite Tel Aviv)
