= 1982–83 FIBA European Champions Cup =

- League: FIBA European Champions Cup
- Sport: Basketball
- Duration: October 6, 1982 - March 24, 1983

Final
- Champions: (Italy) Ford Cantù (2nd title)
- Runners-up: (Italy) Billy Milano

FIBA European Champions Cup seasons
- ← 1981–82 1983–84 →

The 1982–83 FIBA European Champions Cup was the 26th season of the European top-tier level professional basketball club competition FIBA European Champions Cup (now called EuroLeague). The Final was held at the Palais des Sports, in Grenoble, France, on March 24, 1983. Ford Cantù won their second title in a row, defeating another Italian club, Billy Milano, by a result of 69–68. In this season, FIBA reintroduced the preliminary knock-out rounds, which were abandoned after the 1975–76 season.

== Competition system ==
- Twenty-four teams (European national domestic league champions, plus the then current title holders), playing in a tournament system, played knock-out rounds on a home and away basis. The aggregate score of both games decided the winner.
- The six remaining teams after the knock-out rounds entered a Semifinal Group Stage, which was played as a round-robin. The final standing was based on individual wins and defeats. In the case of a tie between two or more teams after the group stage, the following criteria were used:
1. number of wins in one-to-one games between the teams;
2. basket average between the teams;
3. general basket average within the group.
- The winner and the runner-up of the Semifinal Group Stage qualified for the final, which was played at a predetermined venue.

== First round ==
Team 1	Agg.	Team 2	1st leg	2nd leg
Murray Edinburgh (Scotland)	145-155	(Switzerland) Fribourg Olympic	74–78	71–77
T71 Dudelange (Luxembourg)	97-203	(Italy) Ford Cantù	51–99	46–104
Partizani Tirana (Albania)	154-171	(Hungary) Honvéd	90–81	64–90
Union Récréation Alexandria (Egypt)	110-154	(Socialist Federal Republic of Yugoslavia) Cibona	58–65	52–89
Ammerud (Norway)	123-222	(Netherlands) Nationale-Nederlanden Donar	56–106	67–116
UBSC Wien (Austria)	140-179	(Israel) Maccabi Elite Tel Aviv	63–85	77–94
Sutton & Crystal Palace (England)	173-171	(West Germany) Saturn Köln	75–74	98–97
Alvik (Sweden)	188-191	(Spain) Real Madrid	93–99	95–92
Turun NMKY (Finland)	167-149	(Czechoslovakia) VŠ Praha	90–63	77–86
BMS (Denmark)	140-238	(Soviet Union) CSKA Moscow	67–114	73–124
Panathinaikos (Greece)	125-167	(France) Moderne	58–55	67–112
Eczacıbaşı (Turkey)	154-190	(Italy) Billy Milano	82–86	72–104

== Second round ==
Team 1	Agg.	Team 2	1st leg	2nd leg
Fribourg Olympic (Switzerland)	154-220	(Italy) Ford Cantù	75–112	79–108
Honvéd (Hungary)	187-209	(Socialist Federal Republic of Yugoslavia) Cibona	89–87	98–122
Nationale-Nederlanden Donar (Netherlands)	144-157	(Israel) Maccabi Elite Tel Aviv	76–69	68–88
Sutton & Crystal Palace (England)	170-192	(Spain) Real Madrid	89–81	81–111
Turun NMKY (Finland)	163-220	(Soviet Union) CSKA Moscow	71-89	92–131
Moderne (France)	143-171	(Italy) Billy Milano	64–85	79–86

== Semifinal group stage ==
Key to colors
Top two places in the group advance to Final

	Team	Pld	Pts	W	L	PF	PA
1.	(Italy) Ford Cantù	10	17	7	3	856	762
2.	(Italy) Billy Milano	10	17	7	3	796	766
3.	(Spain) Real Madrid	10	16	6	4	901	853
4.	(Soviet Union) CSKA Moscow	10	15	5	5	849	856
5.	(Israel) Maccabi Elite Tel Aviv	10	15	5	5	866	839
6.	(Socialist Federal Republic of Yugoslavia) Cibona	10	10	0	10	792	984

== Final ==
March 24, Palais des Sports, Grenoble

Team 1	Score	Team 2
Ford Cantù (Italy)	69–68	(Italy) Billy Milano

1982–83 FIBA European Champions Cup
Champions

Ford Cantù
2nd Title

== Awards ==
=== FIBA European Champions Cup Finals Top Scorer ===
- (Italy) Antonello Riva ( (Italy) Ford Cantù)
