= 1981–82 FIBA European Champions Cup =

- League: FIBA European Champions Cup
- Sport: Basketball
- Duration: October 8, 1981 – March 25, 1982

Final
- Champions: (Italy) Squibb Cantù (1st title)
- Runners-up: (Israel) Maccabi Elite Tel Aviv

FIBA European Champions Cup seasons
- ← 1980–81 1982–83 →

The 1981–82 FIBA European Champions Cup was the 25th season of the European top-tier level professional basketball club competition FIBA European Champions Cup (now called EuroLeague). The Final was held at the Sporthalle, in Cologne, West Germany, on March 25, 1982. Squibb Cantù defeated the defending title holders, Maccabi Elite Tel Aviv, by a result of 86–80.

== Competition system ==
- 24 teams (European national domestic league champions, plus the then current title holders), playing in a tournament system, entered a Quarterfinal Group Stage, divided into six groups that played in a round-robin. The final standing was based on individual wins and defeats. In the case of a tie between two or more teams after the group stage, the following criteria were used to decide the final classification: 1) number of wins in one-to-one games between the teams; 2) basket average between the teams; 3) general basket average within the group.
- The 6 group winners of the Quarterfinal Group Stage advanced to Semifinal Group Stage, which was played as a single group under the same round-robin rules.
- The group winner and the runner-up of the Semifinal Group Stage qualified for the final, which was played at a predetermined venue.

== Quarterfinal group stage ==
Key to colors
| Top place in each group advance to Semifinal group stage |

=== Group A ===
| | Team | Pld | Pts | W | L | PF | PA |
|---|---|---|---|---|---|---|---|
| 1. | (Israel) Maccabi Elite Tel Aviv | 6 | 12 | 6 | 0 | 632 | 512 |
| 2. | (Finland) Torpan Pojat | 6 | 9 | 3 | 3 | 529 | 587 |
| 3. | (Romania) Steaua București | 6 | 8 | 2 | 4 | 501 | 532 |
| 4. | (West Germany) Saturn Köln | 6 | 7 | 1 | 5 | 506 | 537 |

=== Group B ===
| | Team | Pld | Pts | W | L | PF | PA |
|---|---|---|---|---|---|---|---|
| 1. | (Italy) Squibb Cantù | 4 | 8 | 4 | 0 | 359 | 306 |
| 2. | (Austria) UBSC Wien | 4 | 6 | 2 | 2 | 328 | 337 |
| 3. | (Albania) Partizani Tirana | 4 | 4 | 0 | 4 | 312 | 356 |
| 4. | (Portugal) Sporting* | 0 | 0 | 0 | 0 | 0 | 0 |

*Sporting was drawn into this group, but withdrew before the competition.

=== Group C ===
| | Team | Pld | Pts | W | L | PF | PA |
|---|---|---|---|---|---|---|---|
| 1. | (Socialist Federal Republic of Yugoslavia) Partizan | 4 | 8 | 4 | 0 | 363 | 328 |
| 2. | (Czechoslovakia) Slavia VŠ Praha | 4 | 5 | 1 | 3 | 347 | 348 |
| 3. | (Turkey) Eczacıbaşı | 4 | 5 | 1 | 3 | 315 | 349 |
| 4. | (Egypt) Zamalek SC* | 0 | 0 | 0 | 0 | 0 | 0 |

*Zamalek SC was drawn into this group, but withdrew before the competition.

=== Group D ===
| | Team | Pld | Pts | W | L | PF | PA |
|---|---|---|---|---|---|---|---|
| 1. | (Netherlands) Nashua EBBC | 6 | 12 | 6 | 0 | 635 | 456 |
| 2. | (Belgium) Sunair Oostende | 6 | 10 | 4 | 2 | 552 | 502 |
| 3. | (England) Sunderland Saints | 6 | 8 | 2 | 4 | 546 | 523 |
| 4. | (Luxembourg) Amicale | 6 | 6 | 0 | 6 | 376 | 628 |

=== Group E ===
| | Team | Pld | Pts | W | L | PF | PA |
|---|---|---|---|---|---|---|---|
| 1. | (Spain) FC Barcelona | 6 | 11 | 5 | 1 | 660 | 544 |
| 2. | (France) ASVEL | 6 | 11 | 5 | 1 | 559 | 525 |
| 3. | (Hungary) Honvéd | 6 | 7 | 1 | 5 | 529 | 605 |
| 4. | (Scotland) Murray Edinburgh | 6 | 7 | 1 | 5 | 474 | 548 |

=== Group F ===
| | Team | Pld | Pts | W | L | PF | PA |
|---|---|---|---|---|---|---|---|
| 1. | (Greece) Panathinaikos | 4 | 7 | 3 | 1 | 354 | 333 |
| 2. | (Soviet Union) CSKA Moscow | 4 | 7 | 3 | 1 | 362 | 314 |
| 3. | (Bulgaria) Levski-Spartak | 4 | 4 | 0 | 4 | 314 | 383 |
| 4. | (Syria) Al-Ittihad Aleppo* | 0 | 0 | 0 | 0 | 0 | 0 |

*Al-Ittihad Aleppo was drawn into this group, but withdrew before the competition.

== Semifinal group stage ==
Key to colors
| Top two places in the group advance to Final |

| | Team | Pld | Pts | W | L | PF | PA |
|---|---|---|---|---|---|---|---|
| 1. | (Israel) Maccabi Elite Tel Aviv | 10 | 19 | 9 | 1 | 953 | 907 |
| 2. | (Italy) Squibb Cantù | 10 | 17 | 7 | 3 | 939 | 816 |
| 3. | (Socialist Federal Republic of Yugoslavia) Partizan | 10 | 16 | 6 | 4 | 954 | 910 |
| 4. | (Spain) FC Barcelona | 10 | 15 | 5 | 5 | 968 | 931 |
| 5. | (Netherlands) Nashua EBBC | 10 | 12 | 2 | 8 | 854 | 957 |
| 6. | (Greece) Panathinaikos | 10 | 11 | 1 | 9 | 831 | 978 |

== Final ==
March 25, Sporthalle, Cologne

| Team 1 | Score | Team 2 |
|---|---|---|
| Maccabi Elite Tel Aviv (Israel) | 80–86 | (Italy) Squibb Cantù |

1981–82 FIBA European Champions Cup
Champions

Squibb Cantù
1st Title

== Awards ==
=== FIBA European Champions Cup Finals Top Scorer ===
- (United States) Bruce Flowers ( (Italy) Squibb Cantù)
