= 1989 FIBA European Champions Cup Final Four =

International basketball tournament

Tournament details
- Arena: Olympiahalle; Munich, West Germany
- Dates: April 1989

Final positions
- Champions: (Socialist Federal Republic of Yugoslavia) Jugoplastika (1st title)
- Runners-up: (Israel) Maccabi Elite Tel Aviv
- Third place: (Greece) Aris
- Fourth place: (Spain) FC Barcelona

Awards and statistics
- MVP: (Socialist Federal Republic of Yugoslavia) Dino Radja

The 1989 FIBA European Champions Cup Final Four was the 1988–89 season's FIBA European Champions Cup Final Four tournament, organized by FIBA Europe.

Jugoplastika won its first title, after defeating Maccabi Elite Tel Aviv in the final game.

== Bracket ==
Semi-finals
(Israel) Maccabi Elite Tel Aviv	99
(Greece) Aris	86
(Spain) FC Barcelona	77
(Socialist Federal Republic of Yugoslavia) Jugoplastika	87

Final
(Israel) Maccabi Elite Tel Aviv	69
(Socialist Federal Republic of Yugoslavia) Jugoplastika	75
Third place
(Greece) Aris	88
(Spain) FC Barcelona	71

== Semifinals ==
=== Maccabi Elite – Aris ===
4 April 1989
18:00

Boxscore

Maccabi Elite Tel Aviv (Israel)	99–86	(Greece) Aris
Scoring by half: 50–48, 49–38
Pts: Jamchy 28		Pts: Giannakis 25

Olympiahalle, Munich
Attendance: 12,000
Referees: Vittorio Fiorito (ITA), Philippe Mailhabiau (FRA)

=== FC Barcelona – Jugoplastika ===
4 April 1989
20:00

Boxscore

FC Barcelona (Spain)	77–87	(Socialist Federal Republic of Yugoslavia) Jugoplastika
Scoring by half: 41–50, 36–37
Pts: Epi 16		Pts: Kukoč 24

Olympiahalle, Munich
Attendance: 12,000
Referees: Lubomir Kotleba (TCH), Carl Jungebrand (FIN)

== Third place game ==
6 April 1989
18:00

Boxscore

Aris (Greece)	88–71	(Spain) FC Barcelona
Scoring by half: 48–38, 40–31
Pts: Galis 36		Pts: Norris 18

Olympiahalle, Munich
Attendance: 10,000
Referees: Carl Jungebrand (FIN), Philippe Mailhabiau (FRA)

== Final ==
6 April 1989
20:00

Boxscore

Maccabi Elite Tel Aviv (Israel)	69–75	(Socialist Federal Republic of Yugoslavia) Jugoplastika
Scoring by half: 35–35, 34–40
Pts: Jamchi 25; Rebs: Magee 11; Asts: Barlow 1		Pts: Rađa 20; Rebs: Rađa 10; Asts: Kukoč 3

Olympiahalle, Munich
Attendance: 12,000
Referees: Lubomir Kotleba (TCH), Vittorio Fitorio (ITA)

Maccabi Elite Tel Aviv	Jugoplastika

Starters:			P	R	A
PG	10	(Israel) Hen Lippin	2	0	0
SG	12	(Israel) Doron Jamchi	25	0	0
SF	15	(United States) Ken Barlow	13	6	1
PF	13	(United States) Kevin Magee	10	11	0
C	8	(Israel) LaVon Mercer	10	7	0
Reserves:			P	R	A
SG	4	(Israel) Willie Sims	9	1	0
SF	5	(Israel) Motti Daniel	0	0	0
C	9	(Israel) Eliezer Gordon	DNP		
PG	11	(Israel) Gideon Mehdi	DNP		
C	14	(Israel) Itzhak Cohen	0	0	0
Head coach:
(Israel) Zvi Sherf

1988–89 FIBA European Champions Cup
Champions

Jugoplastika
First title

Starters:			P	R	A
PG	6	(Socialist Federal Republic of Yugoslavia) Luka Pavićević	4	1	0
SG	12	(Socialist Federal Republic of Yugoslavia) Duško Ivanović	12	0	2
SF	7	(Socialist Federal Republic of Yugoslavia) Toni Kukoč	18	2	3
PF	8	(Socialist Federal Republic of Yugoslavia) Goran Sobin	11	6	2
C	14	(Socialist Federal Republic of Yugoslavia) Dino Rađa	20	10	2
Reserves:			P	R	A
PG	4	(Socialist Federal Republic of Yugoslavia) Zoran Sretenović	7	1	1
SF	5	(Socialist Federal Republic of Yugoslavia) Velimir Perasović	1	0	0
PF	9	(Socialist Federal Republic of Yugoslavia) Teo Čizmić	DNP		
PG	10	(Socialist Federal Republic of Yugoslavia) Ivica Burić	DNP		
C	11	(Socialist Federal Republic of Yugoslavia) Žan Tabak	2	3	0
Head coach:
(Socialist Federal Republic of Yugoslavia) Božidar Maljković

== Awards ==
=== FIBA European Champions Cup Final Four MVP ===
- (Socialist Federal Republic of Yugoslavia) Dino Rađa ( (Socialist Federal Republic of Yugoslavia) Jugoplastika)

=== FIBA European Champions Cup Finals Top Scorer ===
- (Israel) Doron Jamchi ( (Israel) Maccabi Elite Tel Aviv)
