= 1984 FIBA European Champions Cup Final =

Banco di Roma Virtus (Italy)	(Spain) FC Barcelona
79	73
- Date: 29 March 1984
- Venue: Patinoire des Vernets, Geneva, Switzerland
- Referees: Kostas Rigas, Mikhail Grigorev
- Attendance: 10,000

The 1984 FIBA European Champions Cup Final was the championship match of the International Basketball Federation held in Geneva, Switzerland on 29 March 1984. The Italian team Virtus Roma was victorious.

== Overview ==
The 1984 FIBA European Champions Cup Finals was played between Banco di Roma(commonly known as Virtus Roma) and FC Barcelona, in the Swiss city of Geneva. Banco di Roma, led by Larry Wright, clinched their first FIBA European Champion, defeating FC Barcelona with the score 79-73. FC Barcelona was leading ten points at halftime, but with Wright's 27 points, 3 rebound 4 assists and 3 steals, Banco di Roma managed to overcome the deficit and secured to victory. Founded in 1960, Banco di Roma ranked top in the Italian League and Europe for many years. However due to playing in a then top-level domestic competition, the club didn't hold many titles. Followed by Italian League champion in 1983, the 1984 FIBA European Champions Cup was the club's first entrance of the final.

FC Barcelona, founded in 1926, had won 13 domestic trophies, but the 1984 FIBA European Champions Final was also the club's first try.

== Match details ==
29 March 1984
21:00

Report

Banco di Roma Virtus (Italy)	79–73	(Spain) FC Barcelona
Scoring by quarter: 32–42, 47–31
Pts: Wright 27; Rebs: Kea 9 Asts: Wright 4		Pts: San Epifanio 31; Rebs: Davis 10; Asts: San Epifanio 5

Patinoire des Vernets, Geneva
Attendance: 10,000
Referees: Kostas Rigas (GRE), Mikhail Grigorev (USSR)

1983–84 FIBA European Champions Cup
Champions

Banco di Roma Virtus
1st Title

== Awards ==
=== FIBA European Champions Cup Finals Top Scorer ===
- (Spain) J.A. San Epifanio "Epi" ( (Spain) FC Barcelona)
