= 1988 FIBA European Champions Cup Final Four =

Basketball tournament

Tournament details
- Arena: Flanders Expo; Ghent, Belgium
- Dates: April 1988

Final positions
- Champions: (Italy) Tracer Milano (3rd title)
- Runners-up: (Israel) Maccabi Elite Tel Aviv
- Third place: (Socialist Federal Republic of Yugoslavia) Partizan
- Fourth place: (Greece) Aris

Awards and statistics
- MVP: (United States) Bob McAdoo

The 1988 FIBA European Champions Cup Final Four was the concluding tournament of the 1987–88 FIBA European Champions Cup, and the first one with the FIBA European Champions Cup Final Four format since the 1967 edition of the European Cup.

Tracer Milano won its third title.

== Bracket ==
Semi-finals
(Greece) Aris	82
(Italy) Tracer Milano	87
(Israel) Maccabi Elite Tel Aviv	87
(Socialist Federal Republic of Yugoslavia) Partizan	82

Final
(Italy) Tracer Milano	90
(Israel) Maccabi Elite Tel Aviv	84
Third place
(Greece) Aris	93
(Socialist Federal Republic of Yugoslavia) Partizan	105

== Semifinals ==
All times are CEST (UTC+2).

=== Partizan – Maccabi Elite Tel Aviv ===
5 April 1988
18:30

Report

Partizan (Socialist Federal Republic of Yugoslavia)	82–87	(Israel) Maccabi Elite Tel Aviv
Scoring by half: 44–43, 38–44
Pts: Grbović, Divac 19		Pts: Magee 31

Flanders Expo, Ghent
Attendance: 9,000
Referees: Lubomir Kotleba (CZE), Vicente Sanchís (SPA)

=== Aris – Tracer Milano ===
5 April 1988
20:30

Report

Aris (Greece)	82–87	(Italy) Tracer Milano
Scoring by half: 45–45, 37–42
Pts: Gallis 28		Pts: McAdoo 39

Flanders Expo, Ghent
Attendance: 9,000
Referees: Mikhail Davidov (USSR), Wieslaw Zych (POL)

== Third-place game ==
7 April 1988
19:00

Report

Partizan (Socialist Federal Republic of Yugoslavia)	105–93	(Greece) Aris
Scoring by half: 48–39, 57–54
Pts: Divac 31		Pts: Gallis 39

Flanders Expo, Ghent
Attendance: 9,000
Referees: Lubomir Kotleba (CZE), Vicente Sanchís (SPA)

== Final ==
7 April 1988
20:30

Report

Tracer Milano (Italy)	90–84	(Israel) Maccabi Elite Tel Aviv
Scoring by half: 52–41, 38–43
Pts: McAdoo 25; Rebs: McAdoo 12; Asts: Premier 3		Pts: Jamchi 24; Rebs: Barlow 14; Asts: Sims 5

Flanders Expo, Ghent
Attendance: 9,000
Referees: Mikhail Davidov (USSR), Wieslaw Zych (POL)

Tracer Milano	Maccabi Elite Tel Aviv

Starters:			P	R	A
PG	8	(Italy) Mike D'Antoni	17	2	1
SG	14	(Italy) Piero Montecchi	8	2	0
SF	7	(Italy) Riccardo Pittis	8	3	1
PF	15	(United States) Bob McAdoo	25	12	1
C	11	(Italy) Dino Meneghin	5	1	0
Reserves:			P	R	A
C	5	(Italy) Fausto Bargna	DNP		
SF	6	(Italy) Massimiliano Aldi	7	0	0
PF	9	(Italy) Mario Governa	DNP		
SG	10	(Italy) Roberto Premier	3	1	0
PF	13	(United States) Rickey Brown	17	8	4
Head coach:
(Italy) Franco Casalini

1987–88 FIBA European Champions Cup
Champions

Tracer Milano
3rd Title

Starters:			P	R	A
PG	7	(Israel) Motti Aroesti	0	4	0
SG	4	(Israel) Willie Sims	15	3	0
SF	12	(Israel) Doron Jamchi	24	3	0
PF	15	(United States) Ken Barlow	21	14	1
C	13	(United States) Kevin Magee	13	6	1
Reserves:			P	R	A
SF	5	(Israel) Motti Daniel	2	3	0
SG	9	(Israel) Miki Berkovich	3	1	0
PG	10	(Israel) Hen Lippin	0	0	0
C	14	(Israel) Itzhak Cohen	6	7	0
Head coach:
(Israel) Ralph Klein

== Awards ==
=== FIBA European Champions Cup Final Four MVP ===
- (United States) Bob McAdoo ( (Italy) Tracer Milano)

=== FIBA European Champions Cup Finals Top Scorer ===
- (United States) Bob McAdoo ( (Italy) Tracer Milano)
