= 1961–62 FIBA European Champions Cup =

- League: FIBA European Champions Cup
- Sport: Basketball

Finals
- Champions: (Soviet Union) Dinamo Tbilisi (1st title)
- Runners-up: (Spain) Real Madrid

FIBA European Champions Cup seasons
- ← 1960–61 1962–63 →

The 1961–62 FIBA European Champions Cup season was the fifth season of the European top-tier level professional basketball club competition FIBA European Champions Cup (now called EuroLeague). It was won by Dinamo Tbilisi, after they beat Real Madrid, in the first ever single game EuroLeague Final, by a result of 90–83, in Geneva, Switzerland. For the first time, only one finals game was played, on a neutral court, due to the unstable political situation at the time.

== Competition system ==
European national domestic league champions, plus the then current FIBA European Champions Cup title holders only, playing in a tournament system. The Final was a single game, played on a neutral court.

== First round ==
Team 1	Agg.	Team 2	1st leg	2nd leg
Casablancais (Morocco)	84–166	(Spain) Real Madrid	46–84	38–82
Celtic (Northern Ireland)	122–226	(Belgium) Antwerpse	62-82	60-144
The Wolves Amsterdam (Netherlands)	87–113	(France) Alsace de Bagnolet	40-52	47-61
Etzella (Luxembourg)	110–149	(West Germany) USC Heidelberg	51-66	59-83
Engelmann Wien (Austria)	141–185	(Socialist Federal Republic of Yugoslavia) AŠK Olimpija	77-99	64-86
SISU (Denmark)	90–156	(Finland) Helsingin Kisa-Toverit	57-70	33-86
Hapoel Tel Aviv (Israel)	166–130	(Greece) Panathinaikos	82-58	84-72
Wissenschaft Berlin (East Germany)	119–197	(Hungary) Honvéd	58-84	61-113
Benfica (Portugal)	97–174	(Italy) Ignis Varese	49-73	48-101

== Round of 16 ==
Team 1	Agg.	Team 2	1st leg	2nd leg
Helsingin Kisa-Toverit (Finland)	145–179	(Poland) Legia Warsaw	65-86	80-93
Ignis Varese (Italy)	144–163	(Spain) Real Madrid	82–80	62–83
USC Heidelberg (West Germany)	139–192	(Socialist Federal Republic of Yugoslavia) AŠK Olimpija	81-95	58-97
Hapoel Tel Aviv (Israel)	139–140	(Turkey) Darüşşafaka	69-65	70-75
Honvéd (Hungary)	148–149	(Czechoslovakia) Iskra Svit	90-74	58-75
Steaua București (Romania)	153–159	(Soviet Union) Dinamo Tbilisi	76-77	77-82
Antwerpse (Belgium)	137–127	(France) Alsace de Bagnolet	87-61	50-66

Automatically qualified to the quarter-finals

- (Soviet Union) CSKA Moscow (title holder)

== Quarterfinals ==
Team 1	Agg.	Team 2	1st leg	2nd leg
CSKA Moscow (Soviet Union)	140–110	(Czechoslovakia) Iskra Svit	85-53	55-57
Darüşşafaka (Turkey)	116–164	(Soviet Union) Dinamo Tbilisi	67-80	49-84
Antwerpse (Belgium)	143–173	(Socialist Federal Republic of Yugoslavia) AŠK Olimpija	87-83	56-90
Legia Warsaw (Poland)	144–162	(Spain) Real Madrid	73–62	71–100

== Semifinals ==
Team 1	Agg.	Team 2	1st leg	2nd leg
CSKA Moscow (Soviet Union)	137–152	(Soviet Union) Dinamo Tbilisi	71-75	66-77
AŠK Olimpija (Socialist Federal Republic of Yugoslavia)	158–160	(Spain) Real Madrid	105–91	53–69

== Final ==
Team 1	Score	Team 2
Dinamo Tbilisi (Soviet Union)	90–83	(Spain) Real Madrid

Patinoire des Vernets, Geneva, Switzerland. Attendance:5,000
29 June 1962

1961–62 FIBA European Champions Cup
Champions

Dinamo Tbilisi
1st Title

Dynamo after the Final

Match Fact File

== Awards ==
=== FIBA European Champions Cup Finals Top Scorer ===
- (United States) Wayne Hightower ( (Spain) Real Madrid)
