= 1987–88 FIBA European Champions Cup =

- League: FIBA European Champions Cup
- Sport: Basketball

Regular Season

Final Four
- Champions: (Italy) Tracer Milano (3rd title)
- Runners-up: (Israel) Maccabi Elite Tel Aviv
- Final Four MVP: (United States) Bob McAdoo (Tracer Milano)

FIBA European Champions Cup seasons
- ← 1986–87 1988–89 →

The 1987–88 FIBA European Champions Cup season was the 31st season of the FIBA European Champions Cup (now called EuroLeague). It was won by Tracer Milano, after they beat Maccabi Elite Tel Aviv 90-84. It was the first season in the competition's modern era where the Final Four format was used to decide the champion. The 1988 FIBA European Champions Cup Final Four was held at Flanders Expo Pavilion in Ghent, Belgium, on 5–7 April 1988. Bob McAdoo was named Final Four MVP.

== Competition system ==
- 23 teams (European national domestic league champions only), playing in a tournament system, played knock-out rounds on a home and away basis. The aggregate score of both games decided the winner.
- The eight remaining teams after the knock-out rounds entered a Quarterfinal Group Stage, played as a round-robin. The final standings were based on individual wins and defeats. In case of a tie between two or more teams after the group stage, the following criteria were used: 1) number of wins in one-to-one games between the teams; 2) basket average between the teams; 3) general basket average within the group.
- The top four teams after the Quarterfinal Group Stage qualified for the final stage (Final Four), played at a predetermined venue.

== First round ==
Team 1	Agg.	Team 2	1st leg	2nd leg
AEL (Cyprus)	143–193	(Hungary) Körmendi Dózsa	72–84	71–109
Benfica (Portugal)	230–161	(Luxembourg) Sparta Bertrange	122–77	108–84
Klosterneuburg (Austria)	200–221	(Switzerland) Pully	93–104	107–117
Nashua EBBC (Netherlands)	178–161	(Finland) NMKY Helsinki	91–78	87–83
Zbrojovka Brno (Czechoslovakia)	189–173	(England) Portsmouth	94-76	95–97
Södertälje (Sweden)	179–159	(Belgium) Maes Pils	89–93	90–69
MIM Livingston (Scotland)	170–189	(West Germany) Saturn 77 Köln	82–98	88–91

== Round of 16 ==
Team 1	Agg.	Team 2	1st leg	2nd leg
Balkan Botevgrad (Bulgaria)	167–190	(Italy) Tracer Milano	79–93	88–97
Orthez (France)	212–167	(Turkey) Karşıyaka	124–82	88–85
FC Barcelona (Spain)	269–134	(Poland) Śląsk Wrocław	129–65	140–69
Körmendi Dózsa (Hungary)	165–231	(Socialist Federal Republic of Yugoslavia) Partizan	94–130	71–101
Maccabi Elite Tel Aviv (Israel)	192–165	(Portugal) Benfica	111-86	81–79
Pully (Switzerland)	229–240	(Greece) Aris	125–127	104–113
Nashua EBBC (Netherlands)	184–161	(Czechoslovakia) Zbrojovka Brno	87–78	97–83
Södertälje (Sweden)	207–257	(West Germany) Saturn 77 Köln	119–126	88–131

== Quarterfinal round ==
Key to colors
Top four places in the group advance to Final four

	Team	Pld	Pts	W	L	PF	PA
1.	(Socialist Federal Republic of Yugoslavia) Partizan	14	24	10	4	1290	1260
2.	(Greece) Aris	14	23	9	5	1346	1315
3.	(Italy) Tracer Milano	14	23	9	5	1304	1286
4.	(Israel) Maccabi Elite Tel Aviv	14	22	8	6	1326	1320
5.	(Spain) FC Barcelona	14	21	7	7	1367	1278
6.	(West Germany) Saturn 77 Köln	14	19	5	9	1402	1415
7.	(France) Orthez	14	18	4	10	1210	1229
8.	(Netherlands) Nashua EBBC	14	18	4	10	1299	1441

== Final four ==
=== Semifinals ===
April 5, Flanders Expo, Ghent

Team 1	Score	Team 2
Partizan (Socialist Federal Republic of Yugoslavia)	82–87	(Israel) Maccabi Elite Tel Aviv
Aris (Greece)	82–87	(Italy) Tracer Milano

=== 3rd place game ===
April 7, Flanders Expo, Ghent

Team 1	Score	Team 2
Partizan (Socialist Federal Republic of Yugoslavia)	105–93	(Greece) Aris

=== Final ===
April 7, Flanders Expo, Ghent

Team 1	Score	Team 2
Tracer Milano (Italy)	90–84	(Israel) Maccabi Elite Tel Aviv

1987–88 FIBA European Champions Cup
Champions

Tracer Milano
3rd Title

=== Final standings ===
	Team
	(Italy) Tracer Milano
2nd place, silver medalist(s)	(Israel) Maccabi Elite Tel Aviv
3rd place, bronze medalist(s)	(Socialist Federal Republic of Yugoslavia) Partizan
	(Greece) Aris

== Awards ==
=== FIBA European Champions Cup Final Four MVP ===
- (United States) Bob McAdoo ( (Italy) Tracer Milano)

=== FIBA European Champions Cup Finals Top Scorer ===
- (United States) Bob McAdoo ( (Italy) Tracer Milano)
