= Bruce Flowers =

American basketball player

Personal information
- Born: June 13, 1957 (age 69) Rochester, New York, U.S.
- Listed height: 6 ft 8 in (2.03 m)
- Listed weight: 225 lb (102 kg)

Career information
- High school: Berkley (Berkley, Michigan)
- College: Notre Dame (1975–1979)
- NBA draft: 1979: 2nd round, 26th overall pick
- Drafted by: Cleveland Cavaliers
- Playing career: 1979–1987
- Position: Power forward
- Number: 23

Career history
- 1979–1982: Gabetti / Squibb Cantù
- 1982–1983: Cleveland Cavaliers
- 1984–1986: Virtus Banco di Roma
- 1986–1987: Filanto Desio

Career highlights
- 2× FIBA Intercontinental Cup champion (1982, 1985); EuroLeague champion (1982); FIBA Korać Cup champion (1986); First-team Parade All-American (1975)
- Stats at NBA.com
- Stats at Basketball Reference

Bruce Flowers (born June 13, 1957) is an American former professional basketball player. At a height of 2.04 m (6 ft 8 1/2 in) tall, he played as a power forward. Flowers is one of the few American players to have won all three of the different major European titles during his playing era, meaning the EuroLeague, as well as the now defunct FIBA Saporta Cup and FIBA Korać Cup competitions.

== Professional career ==
=== NBA ===
Flowers was drafted 26th overall by the Cleveland Cavaliers in the 1979 NBA draft, but only appeared in one NBA season.

=== Europe ===
Starting his European pro career in Cantù, he helped them win both the Italian League championship and the 1980–81 FIBA Saporta Cup. Flowers would add the EuroLeague title with Cantù in 1981–82, scoring 21 points in the EuroLeague Final against Maccabi, and he later captured the FIBA Korać Cup trophy with Virtus Roma in 1985–86.

On February 3, 2008, Flowers was among the 105 player nominees for the 50 Greatest EuroLeague Contributors list, commemorating the fiftieth anniversary of the competition.

== Career statistics ==
Legend
GP	Games played	GS	Games started	MPG	Minutes per game
FG%	Field goal percentage	3P%	3-point field goal percentage	FT%	Free throw percentage
RPG	Rebounds per game	APG	Assists per game	SPG	Steals per game
BPG	Blocks per game	PPG	Points per game	**Bold**	Career high

=== NBA ===
==== Regular season ====
Year	Team	GP	GS	MPG	FG%	3P%	FT%	RPG	APG	SPG	BPG	PPG
1982–83	Cleveland	53	5	13.2	.534	.000	.774	3.4	.9	.4	.2	4.9
