= 1967 FIBA European Champions Cup Final Four =

Tournament details
- Arena: Pabellón de la Ciudad Deportiva del Real; Madrid, Spain
- Dates: March & April 1967

Final positions
- Champions: (Spain) Real Madrid (3rd title)
- Runners-up: (Italy) Simmenthal Milano
- Third place: (Czechoslovakia) Slavia VŠ Praha
- Fourth place: (Socialist Federal Republic of Yugoslavia) AŠK Olimpija

Awards and statistics
- MVP: N/A

The 1967 FIBA European Champions Cup Final Four was the concluding tournament of the 1966–67 FIBA European Champions Cup, and the last final four format until the new FIBA European Champions Cup Final Four era began in the late 1980s, with the 1988 FIBA European Champions Cup Final Four.

Real Madrid won its third FIBA European Champions Cup (EuroLeague) title.

== Bracket ==
Semi-finals
(Spain) Real Madrid	88
(Socialist Federal Republic of Yugoslavia) AŠK Olimpija	86
(Italy) Simmenthal Milano	103
(Czechoslovakia) Slavia VŠ Praha	97

Final
(Spain) Real Madrid	91
(Italy) Simmenthal Milano	83
Third place
(Socialist Federal Republic of Yugoslavia) AŠK Olimpija	83
(Czechoslovakia) Slavia VŠ Praha	88

=== Final standings ===
	Team
	(Spain) Real Madrid
Silver medal	(Italy) Simmenthal Milano
Bronze medal	(Czechoslovakia) Slavia VŠ Praha
	(Socialist Federal Republic of Yugoslavia) AŠK Olimpija

1966–67 FIBA European Champions Cup
Champions

Real Madrid
3rd title

== Awards ==
=== FIBA European Champions Cup Finals Top Scorer ===
- (United States) Steve Chubin ( (Italy) Simmenthal Milano)
