= 1982 FIBA European Champions Cup Final =

Squibb Cantù (Italy)	(Israel) Maccabi Tel Aviv
86	80
- Date: 25 March 1982
- Venue: Sporthalle, Cologne, Germany
- Referees: Yvan Mainini, Pedro Hernandez Cabrera
- Attendance: 8,000

This article lists the results for the 1982 FIFA European Championship Cup finals

== Match details ==
25 March 1982
20:30

Report

Squibb Cantù (Italy)	86–80	(Israel) Maccabi Tel Aviv
Scoring by quarter: 44–39, 42–41
Pts: Flowers 23		Pts: Berkovich, Silver 16

Sporthalle, Cologne
Attendance: 8,000
Referees: Yvan Mainini (FRA), Pedro Hernandez Cabrera (SPA)

1981–82 FIBA European Champions Cup
Champions

Squibb Cantù
1st Title

== Awards ==
=== FIBA European Champions Cup Finals Top Scorer ===
- (United States) Bruce Flowers ( (Italy) Squibb Cantù)
