= 1983 FIBA European Champions Cup Final =

Ford Cantù (Italy)	(Italy) Billy Milano
69	68
- Date: 24 March 1983
- Venue: Palais des Sports, Grenoble, France
- Referees: Yvan Mainini, Lubomir Kotleba
- Attendance: 12,000

The 1983 FIBA European Champions Cup Final was the championship match of the International Basketball Federation held in Grenoble, France on 24 March 1983. The Italian team Ford Cantù (now Pallacanestro Cantù) was victorious.

== Match details ==
24 March 1983
20:30

Report

Ford Cantù (Italy)	69–68	(Italy) Billy Milano
Scoring by quarter: 29–22, 40–46
Pts: Riva 20		Pts: Gianelli 18

Palais des Sports, Grenoble
Attendance: 12,000
Referees: Yvan Mainini (FRA), Lubomir Kotleba (CZE)

1982–83 FIBA European Champions Cup
Champions

Ford Cantù
2nd Title

== Awards ==
=== FIBA European Champions Cup Finals Top Scorer ===
- (Italy) Antonello Riva ( (Italy) Ford Cantù)
