= Lee Johnson (basketball) =

American basketball player (born 1957)

Personal information
- Born: June 16, 1957 (age 69) Plumerville, Arkansas, U.S.
- Listed height: 6 ft 11 in (2.11 m)
- Listed weight: 205 lb (93 kg)

Career information
- High school: Omaha South (Omaha, Nebraska)
- College: McCook CC (1975–1976); Montana (1976–1977); East Texas A&M (1977–1979)
- NBA draft: 1979: 1st round, 17th overall pick
- Drafted by: Houston Rockets
- Playing career: 1979–1993
- Position: Power forward / center
- Number: 1, 50

Career history
- 1979–1980: Arrigoni Rieti
- 1980: Houston Rockets
- 1980: Detroit Pistons
- 1980–1981: Rochester Zeniths
- 1981–1984: Seleco / Febal Napoli
- 1984–1987: Maccabi Tel Aviv
- 1987–1988: Enichem Livorno
- 1988–1989: Paris Basket Racing
- 1989–1993: Olympique Antibes

Career highlights
- FIBA Korać Cup champion (1980); French League champion (1991); 3× Israeli League champion (1985–1987); 3× Israeli Cup winner (1985–1987); CBA champion (1981); CBA Playoff/Finals MVP (1981); All-CBA First Team (1981); CBA Rookie of the Year (1981); CBA blocks leader (1981)
- Stats at NBA.com
- Stats at Basketball Reference

Lee Willie Johnson (born 16 June 1957) is an American former professional basketball player. He played briefly in the National Basketball Association (NBA) and several other leagues.

== College career ==
Johnson played college basketball for four years at East Texas State University, before being drafted by the Houston Rockets in the 1979 NBA draft.

== Professional career ==
Johnson played only one season in the NBA, with the Rockets and Detroit Pistons. Johnson played for the Rochester Zeniths of the Continental Basketball Association (CBA) during the 1980–81 season and was selected as the CBA Playoff/Finals MVP and CBA Rookie of the Year and named to the All-CBA First Team.

Johnson also played in Italy, Israel, and France, most notably for Arrigoni Rieti, with whom he won the 1979–80 season of Korać Cup, and with Maccabi Tel Aviv, from 1984 through 1987.

== Career statistics ==
Legend
GP	Games played	GS	Games started	MPG	Minutes per game
FG%	Field goal percentage	3P%	3-point field goal percentage	FT%	Free throw percentage
RPG	Rebounds per game	APG	Assists per game	SPG	Steals per game
BPG	Blocks per game	PPG	Points per game	**Bold**	Career high

=== NBA ===
==== Regular season ====
Year	Team	GP	MPG	FG%	3P%	FT%	RPG	APG	SPG	BPG	PPG
1980–81	Houston	**10**	**8.0**	**.304**	–	**.600**	**2.0**	**.1**	.0	**.5**	**1.7**
1980–81	Detroit	2	5.0	.000	–	–	1.0	.0	.0	.0	.0
Career		12	7.5	.280	–	.600	1.8	.1	.0	.4	1.4

== Awards ==
- 1980–81 CBA Rookie of the Year
- 1980–81 CBA Playoffs MVP
