= 1987 FIBA European Champions Cup Final =

Basketball game

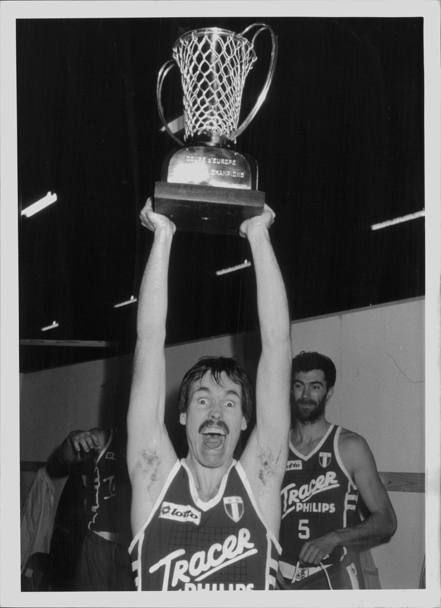
- Mike D'Antoni of Tracer Milano holding the trophy
(Italy) Tracer Milano	Maccabi Tel Aviv (Israel)
71	69
- Date: 2 April 1987
- Venue: CIG de Malley, Lausanne, Switzerland
- Referees: Stavros Douvis, Wieslaw Zych
- Attendance: 10,500

The 1987 FIBA European Champions Cup Final was the deciding game of the 1986–87 FIBA European Champions Cup season. The game was played on 2 April 1987, at the Centre Intercommunal de Glace de Malley, in Lausanne, Switzerland.

== Match details ==
2 April 1987	Tracer Milano (Italy)	71–69	(Israel) Maccabi Tel Aviv	Lausanne, Switzerland
20:30 (GMT)	Scoring by quarter: 33–36, 38–33
	Pts: Premier 23; Rebs: McAdoo 9 Asts: McAdoo 3	Report	Pts: Johnson 24; Rebs: Johnson 12; Asts: Johnson, Mickey Berkowitz 1	Arena: Centre Intercommunal de Glace de Malley; Attendance: 10,500; Referees: Stavros Douvis (GRE), Wieslaw Zych (POL)

== Awards ==
=== FIBA European Champions Cup Finals Top Scorer ===
- (United States) Lee Johnson ( (Israel) Maccabi Tel Aviv)
