= FIBA European Champions Cup and EuroLeague records and statistics =

This page details statistics of the FIBA European Champions Cup and EuroLeague.

== General performances ==
=== By club ===
Club	City	Champions	Runner-up	Years won	Years runner-up
(Spain) Real Madrid	Madrid	11	11	1964, 1965, 1967, 1968, 1974, 1978, 1980, 1995, 2015, 2018, 2023	1962, 1963, 1969, 1975, 1976, 1985, 2013, 2014, 2022, 2024, 2026
(Soviet Union) (Russia) CSKA Moscow	Moscow	8	6	1961, 1963, 1969, 1971, 2006, 2008, 2016, 2019	1965, 1970, 1973, 2007, 2009, 2012
(Greece) Panathinaikos	Athens	7	1	1996, 2000, 2002, 2007, 2009, 2011, 2024	2001
(Israel) Maccabi Tel Aviv	Tel Aviv	6	9	1977, 1981, 2001, 2004, 2005, 2014	1980, 1982, 1987, 1988, 1989, 2000, 2006, 2008, 2011
(Italy) Varese	Varese	5	5	1970, 1972, 1973, 1975, 1976	1971, 1974, 1977, 1978, 1979
(Greece) Olympiacos	Piraeus	4	6	1997, 2012, 2013, 2026	1994, 1995, 2010, 2015, 2017, 2023
(Italy) Olimpia Milano	Milan	3	2	1966, 1987, 1988	1967, 1983
(Soviet Union) (Latvia) Rīgas ASK	Riga	3	1	1958, 1959, 1960	1961
(Socialist Federal Republic of Yugoslavia) (Croatia) Split	Split	3	1	1989, 1990, 1991	1972
(Spain) FC Barcelona	Barcelona	2	6	2003, 2010	1984, 1990, 1991, 1996, 1997, 2021
(Italy) Virtus Bologna	Bologna	2	3	1998, 2001	1981, 1999, 2002
(Turkey) Fenerbahçe	Istanbul	2	2	2017, 2025	2016, 2018
(Turkey) Anadolu Efes	Istanbul	2	1	2021, 2022	2019
(Italy) Cantù	Cantù	2	0	1982, 1983	
(Socialist Federal Republic of Yugoslavia) (Croatia) Cibona	Zagreb	2	0	1985, 1986	
(Soviet Union) (Georgia (country)) Dinamo Tbilisi	Tbilisi	1	1	1962	1960
(Spain) Joventut Badalona	Badalona	1	1	1994	1992
(Lithuania) Žalgiris	Kaunas	1	1	1999	1986
(Socialist Federal Republic of Yugoslavia) (Bosnia and Herzegovina) Bosna	Sarajevo	1	0	1979	
(Italy) Virtus Roma	Rome	1	0	1984	
(Socialist Federal Republic of Yugoslavia) (Serbia) Partizan	Belgrade	1	0	1992	
(France) Limoges	Limoges	1	0	1993	

- Maccabi Elite Tel Aviv beat Panathinaikos in the 2000-01 FIBA SuproLeague final. The league did not contain all of the European champions.
- Kinder Bologna beat Tau Cerámica in the 2000–01 Euroleague final. The league did not contain all of the European champions.

=== By nation ===
Nation	Winners	Runners-Up	Winning Clubs	Runners-Up
Spain	14	20	Real Madrid (11), FC Barcelona (2), Joventut (1)	Real Madrid (11), FC Barcelona (6), Baskonia (2), Joventut (1)
Italy	13	13	Varese (5), Olimpia Milano (3), Virtus Bologna (2), Cantù (2), Virtus Roma (1)	Varese (5), Virtus Bologna (3), Olimpia Milano (2), Treviso (2), Fortitudo Bologna (1)
Greece	11	8	Panathinaikos (7), Olympiacos (4)	Olympiacos (6), Panathinaikos (1), AEK (1)
Soviet Union	8	6	CSKA Moscow (4), Rīgas ASK (3), Dinamo Tbilisi (1)	CSKA Moscow (3), Rīgas ASK (1), Dinamo Tbilisi (1)
(Socialist Federal Republic of Yugoslavia) Yugoslavia	7	1	Split (3), Cibona (2), Bosna (1), Partizan (1)	Split (1)
Israel	6	9	Maccabi Tel Aviv (6)	Maccabi Tel Aviv (9)
Russia	4	3	CSKA Moscow (4)	CSKA Moscow (3)
Turkey	4	3	Anadolu Efes (2), Fenerbahçe (2)	Fenerbahçe (2), Anadolu Efes (1)
France	1	1	Limoges (1)	AS Monaco (1)
Lithuania	1	1	Žalgiris (1)	Žalgiris (1)
Czechoslovakia	-	3	-	Brno (2), USK Praha (1)
Bulgaria	-	2	-	Academic (2)

=== By head coach ===
Coach	Cups	Years
(Socialist Federal Republic of Yugoslavia) (Federal Republic of Yugoslavia) (Serbia) Željko Obradović	9	1992, 1994, 1995, 2000, 2002, 2007, 2009, 2011, 2017
(Soviet Union) Alexander Gomelsky	4	1958, 1959, 1960, 1971
(Spain) Pedro Ferrándiz	4	1965, 1967, 1968, 1974
(Socialist Federal Republic of Yugoslavia) (Federal Republic of Yugoslavia) Božidar Maljković	4	1989, 1990, 1993, 1996
(Italy) Ettore Messina	4	1998, 2001 Euroleague Basketball, 2006, 2008
(Socialist Federal Republic of Yugoslavia) Aca Nikolić	3	1970, 1972, 1973
(Israel) Pini Gershon	3	2001 FIBA SuproLeague, 2004, 2005
(Turkey) Ergin Ataman	3	2021, 2022, 2024
(Soviet Union) Evgeny Alekseev	2	1961, 1963
(Italy) Sandro Gamba	2	1975, 1976
(Spain) Lolo Sainz	2	1978, 1980
(Italy) Valerio Bianchini	2	1982, 1984
(Socialist Federal Republic of Yugoslavia) Željko Pavličević	2	1986, 1991
(Federal Republic of Yugoslavia) (Serbia) Dušan Ivković	2	1997, 2012
(Spain) Pablo Laso	2	2015, 2018
(Greece) Dimitrios Itoudis	2	2016, 2019
(Greece) Georgios Bartzokas	2	2013, 2026
(Soviet Union) Otar Korkiya	1	1962
(Spain) Joaquín Hernández	1	1964
(Italy) Cesare Rubini	1	1966
(Soviet Union) Armenak Alachachian	1	1969
(Israel) Ralph Klein	1	1977
(Socialist Federal Republic of Yugoslavia) Bogdan Tanjević	1	1979
(United States) Rudy D'Amico	1	1981
(Italy) Giancarlo Primo	1	1983
(Socialist Federal Republic of Yugoslavia) Mirko Novosel	1	1985
(United States) Dan Peterson	1	1987
(Italy) Franco Casalini	1	1988
(Lithuania) Jonas Kazlauskas	1	1999
(Serbia and Montenegro) Svetislav Pešić	1	2003
(Spain) Xavi Pascual	1	2010
(United States) (Israel) David Blatt	1	2014
(Spain) Chus Mateo	1	2023
(Lithuania) Šarūnas Jasikevičius	1	2025

=== Players with the most championships ===
Player	Cups	Years
(Italy) Dino Meneghin	7	1970, 1972, 1973, 1975, 1976, 1987, 1988
(Spain) Clifford Luyk	6	1964, 1965, 1967, 1968, 1974, 1978
(Italy) Aldo Ossola	5	1970, 1972, 1973, 1975, 1976
(Greece) Fragiskos Alvertis	5	1996, 2000, 2002, 2007, 2009
(Spain) Wayne Brabender	4	1968, 1974, 1978, 1980
(Spain) Cristóbal Rodríguez	4	1967, 1968, 1974, 1978
(Spain) Emiliano Rodríguez	4	1964, 1965, 1967, 1968
(Spain) Lolo Sainz	4	1964, 1965, 1967, 1968
(Spain) Carlos Sevillano	4	1964, 1965, 1967, 1968
(Italy) Edoardo Rusconi	4	1970, 1972, 1973, 1975
(Italy) Marino Zanatta	4	1972, 1973, 1975, 1976
(Italy) Ivan Bisson	4	1972, 1973, 1975, 1976
(Italy) Fausto Bargna	4	1982, 1983, 1987, 1988
(Lithuania) Šarūnas Jasikevičius	4	2003, 2004, 2005, 2009
(United States) Kyle Hines	4	2012, 2013, 2016, 2019
(Greece) Kostas Sloukas	4	2012, 2013, 2017, 2024

=== By city ===
City	Winners	Runners-up	Winning clubs	Runners-up
(Spain) Madrid	11	11	Real Madrid (11)	Real Madrid (11)
(Russia) Moscow	8	6	CSKA Moscow (8)	CSKA Moscow (6)
(Greece) Athens	7	2	Panathinaikos (7)	Panathinaikos (1), AEK (1)
(Israel) Tel Aviv	6	9	Maccabi Tel Aviv (6)	Maccabi Tel Aviv (9)
(Italy) Varese	5	5	Pallacanestro Varese (5)	Pallacanestro Varese (5)
(Greece) Piraeus	4	6	Olympiacos (4)	Olympiacos (6)
(Turkey) Istanbul	4	3	Anadolu Efes (2), Fenerbahçe (2)	Fenerbahçe (2), Anadolu Efes (1)
(Italy) Milan	3	2	Olimpia Milano (3)	Olimpia Milano (2)
(Latvia) Riga	3	1	Rīgas ASK (3)	Rīgas ASK (1)
(Croatia) Split	3	1	Split (3)	Split (1)
(Spain) Barcelona	2	6	FC Barcelona (2)	FC Barcelona (6)
(Italy) Bologna	2	4	Virtus Bologna (2)	Virtus Bologna (3), Fortitudo Bologna (1)
(Italy) Cantù	2	0	Pallacanestro Cantù (2)	
(Croatia) Zagreb	2	0	Cibona (2)	
(Georgia (country)) Tbilisi	1	1	Dinamo Tbilisi (1)	Dinamo Tbilisi (1)
(Spain) Badalona	1	1	Joventut (1)	Joventut (1)
(Lithuania) Kaunas	1	1	Žalgiris (1)	Žalgiris (1)
(Bosnia and Herzegovina) Sarajevo	1	0	Bosna (1)	
(Italy) Rome	1	0	Virtus Roma (1)	
(Serbia) Belgrade	1	0	Partizan (1)	
(France) Limoges	1	0	Limoges CSP (1)	
(Bulgaria) Sofia	0	2		Academic (2)
(Czech Republic) Brno	0	2		Spartak Brno (2)
(Italy) Treviso	0	2		Benetton Treviso (2)
(Spain) Vitoria-Gasteiz	0	2		Baskonia (2)
(Czech Republic) Prague	0	1		Slavia Prague (1)
(France) Monaco	0	1		AS Monaco (1)

=== Number of participating clubs of the EuroLeague Basketball era ===
The following is a list of clubs that have played in or qualified for the EuroLeague group stages, during the Euroleague Basketball era.

Nation	No.	Clubs	Seasons
France (13)	13	ASVEL	2001–02, 2002–03, 2003–04, 2004–05, 2009–10, 2019–20, 2020–21, 2021–22, 2022–23, 2023–24, 2024–25, 2025–26, 2026–27
France (13)	6	Pau-Lacq-Orthez	2001–02, 2002–03, 2003–04, 2004–05, 2005–06, 2006–07
France (13)	5	AS Monaco	2021–22, 2022–23, 2023–24, 2024–25, 2025–26
France (13)	3	Le Mans Sarthe	2006–07, 2007–08, 2008–09
France (13)	3	SIG Strasbourg	2005–06, 2013–14, 2015–16
France (13)	3	Paris	2024–25, 2025–26, 2026–27
France (13)	2	SLUC Nancy	2008–09, 2011–12
France (13)	2	Limoges CSP	2014–15, 2015–16
France (13)	1	Chorale Roanne	2007–08
France (13)	1	Orléans	2009–10
France (13)	1	Cholet	2010–11
France (13)	1	Élan Chalon	2012–13
France (13)	1	Nanterre 92	2013–14
Italy (12)	21	Olimpia Milano	2005–06, 2007–08, 2008–09, 2009–10, 2010–11, 2011–12, 2012–13, 2013–14, 2014–15, 2015–16, 2016–17, 2017–18, 2018–19, 2019–20, 2020–21, 2021–22, 2022–23, 2023–24, 2024–25, 2025–26, 2026–27
Italy (12)	11	Mens Sana	2002–03, 2003–04, 2004–05, 2005–06, 2007–08, 2008–09, 2009–10, 2010–11, 2011–12, 2012–13, 2013–14
Italy (12)	9	Virtus Bologna	2000–01, 2001–02, 2002–03, 2007–08, 2022–23, 2023–24, 2024–25, 2025–26, 2026–27
Italy (12)	7	Fortitudo Bologna	2000–01, 2001–02, 2002–03, 2003–04, 2004–05, 2005–06, 2006–07
Italy (12)	7	Treviso	2000–01, 2001–02, 2002–03, 2003–04, 2004–05, 2005–06, 2006–07
Italy (12)	6	Virtus Roma	2003–04, 2006–07, 2007–08, 2008–09, 2009–10, 2010–11
Italy (12)	2	Victoria Libertas	2001–02, 2004–05
Italy (12)	2	Cantù	2011–12, 2012–13
Italy (12)	2	Dinamo Sassari	2014–15, 2015–16
Italy (12)	1	Scaligera Verona	2000–01
Italy (12)	1	Napoli	2006–07
Italy (12)	1	Felice Scandone	2008–09
Spain (9)	27	FC Barcelona	2000–01, 2001–02, 2002–03, 2003–04, 2004–05, 2005–06, 2006–07, 2007–08, 2008–09, 2009–10, 2010–11, 2011–12, 2012–13, 2013–14, 2014–15, 2015–16, 2016–17, 2017–18, 2018–19, 2019–20, 2020–21, 2021–22, 2022–23, 2023–24, 2024–25, 2025–26, 2026–27
Spain (9)	27	Baskonia	2000–01, 2001–02, 2002–03, 2003–04, 2004–05, 2005–06, 2006–07, 2007–08, 2008–09, 2009–10, 2010–11, 2011–12, 2012–13, 2013–14, 2014–15, 2015–16, 2016–17, 2017–18, 2018–19, 2019–20, 2020–21, 2021–22, 2022–23, 2023–24, 2024–25, 2025–26, 2026–27
Spain (9)	25	Real Madrid	2000–01, 2001–02, 2002–03, 2004–05, 2005–06, 2007–08, 2008–09, 2009–10, 2010–11, 2011–12, 2012–13, 2013–14, 2014–15, 2015–16, 2016–17, 2017–18, 2018–19, 2019–20, 2020–21, 2021–22, 2022–23, 2023–24, 2024–25, 2025–26, 2026–27
Spain (9)	16	Málaga	2001–02, 2002–03, 2003–04, 2004–05, 2005–06, 2006–07, 2007–08, 2008–09, 2009–10, 2010–11, 2011–12, 2012–13, 2013–14, 2014–15, 2015–16, 2017–18
Spain (9)	10	Valencia	2003–04, 2010–11, 2014–15, 2017–18, 2019–20, 2020–21, 2022–23, 2023–24, 2025–26, 2026–27
Spain (9)	2	Estudiantes	2000–01, 2004–05
Spain (9)	2	Joventut Badalona	2006–07, 2008–09
Spain (9)	1	Bilbao	2011–12
Spain (9)	1	Gran Canaria	2018–19
Russia (9)	21	CSKA Moscow	2001–02, 2002–03, 2003–04, 2004–05, 2005–06, 2006–07, 2007–08, 2008–09, 2009–10, 2010–11, 2011–12, 2012–13, 2013–14, 2014–15, 2015–16, 2016–17, 2017–18, 2018–19, 2019–20, 2020–21, 2021–22
Russia (9)	8	Khimki	2009–10, 2010–11, 2012–13, 2015–16, 2017–18, 2018–19, 2019–20, 2020–21
Russia (9)	4	UNICS	2011–12, 2014–15, 2016–17, 2021–22
Russia (9)	3	Zenit Saint Petersburg	2019–20, 2020–21, 2021–22
Russia (9)	2	Lokomotiv Kuban	2013–14, 2015–16
Russia (9)	1	St. Petersburg Lions	2000–01
Russia (9)	1	Ural Great Perm	2001–02
Russia (9)	1	Dynamo Moscow	2006–07
Russia (9)	1	Nizhny Novgorod	2014–15
Greece (8)	27	Olympiacos	2000–01, 2001–02, 2002–03, 2003–04, 2004–05, 2005–06, 2006–07, 2007–08, 2008–09, 2009–10, 2010–11, 2011–12, 2012–13, 2013–14, 2014–15, 2015–16, 2016–17, 2017–18, 2018–19, 2019–20, 2020–21, 2021–22, 2022–23, 2023–24, 2024–25, 2025–26, 2026–27
Greece (8)	26	Panathinaikos	2001–02, 2002–03, 2003–04, 2004–05, 2005–06, 2006–07, 2007–08, 2008–09, 2009–10, 2010–11, 2011–12, 2012–13, 2013–14, 2014–15, 2015–16, 2016–17, 2017–18, 2018–19, 2019–20, 2020–21, 2021–22, 2022–23, 2023–24, 2024–25, 2025–26, 2026–27
Greece (8)	6	AEK	2000–01, 2001–02, 2002–03, 2003–04, 2004–05, 2005–06
Greece (8)	2	Peristeri	2000–01, 2001–02
Greece (8)	2	Aris	2006–07, 2007–08
Greece (8)	1	PAOK	2000–01
Greece (8)	1	Panionios	2008–09
Greece (8)	1	Maroussi	2009–10
Turkey (7)	26	Anadolu Efes	2001–02, 2002–03, 2003–04, 2004–05, 2005–06, 2006–07, 2007–08, 2008–09, 2009–10, 2010–11, 2011–12, 2012–13, 2013–14, 2014–15, 2015–16, 2016–17, 2017–18, 2018–19, 2019–20, 2020–21, 2021–22, 2022–23, 2023–24, 2024–25, 2025–26, 2026–27
Turkey (7)	21	Fenerbahçe	2006–07, 2007–08, 2008–09, 2009–10, 2010–11, 2011–12, 2012–13, 2013–14, 2014–15, 2015–16, 2016–17, 2017–18, 2018–19, 2019–20, 2020–21, 2021–22, 2022–23, 2023–24, 2024–25, 2025–26, 2026–27
Turkey (7)	5	Ülker	2001–02, 2002–03, 2003–04, 2004–05, 2005–06
Turkey (7)	4	Galatasaray	2011–12, 2013–14, 2014–15, 2016–17
Turkey (7)	3	Darüşşafaka	2015–16, 2016–17, 2018–19
Turkey (7)	2	Beşiktaş	2012–13, 2026–27
Turkey (7)	1	Karşıyaka	2015–16
Germany (6)	12	Alba Berlin	2001–02, 2002–03, 2003–04, 2008–09, 2012–13, 2014–15, 2019–20, 2020–21, 2021–22, 2022–23, 2023–24, 2024–25
Germany (6)	12	Bayern Munich	2013–14, 2014–15, 2015–16, 2018–19, 2019–20, 2020–21, 2021–22, 2022–23, 2023–24, 2024–25, 2025–26, 2026–27
Germany (6)	9	Brose Bamberg	2005–06, 2007–08, 2010–11, 2011–12, 2012–13, 2013–14, 2015–16, 2016–17, 2017–18
Germany (6)	3	Skyliners Frankfurt	2000–01, 2001–02, 2004–05
Germany (6)	1	Köln 99ers	2006–07
Germany (6)	1	EWE Baskets Oldenburg	2009–10
Croatia (4)	11	Cibona	2000–01, 2001–02, 2002–03, 2003–04, 2004–05, 2005–06, 2006–07, 2007–08, 2008–09, 2009–10, 2010–11
Croatia (4)	3	Cedevita	2012–13, 2014–15, 2015–16
Croatia (4)	2	Zadar	2000–01, 2001–02
Croatia (4)	1	Zagreb	2011–12
Poland (4)	9	Prokom Trefl Sopot	2004–05, 2005–06, 2006–07, 2007–08, 2008–09, 2009–10, 2010–11, 2011–12, 2012–13
Poland (4)	3	Śląsk Wrocław	2001–02, 2002–03, 2003–04
Poland (4)	2	Zielona Góra	2013–14, 2015–16
Poland (4)	1	Turów Zgorzelec	2014–15
Lithuania (3)	27	Žalgiris	2000–01, 2001–02, 2002–03, 2003–04, 2004–05, 2005–06, 2006–07, 2007–08, 2008–09, 2009–10, 2010–11, 2011–12, 2012–13, 2013–14, 2014–15, 2015–16, 2016–17, 2017–18, 2018–19, 2019–20, 2020–21, 2021–22, 2022–23, 2023–24, 2024–25, 2025–26, 2026–27
Lithuania (3)	5	Rytas	2005–06, 2007–08, 2009–10, 2010–11, 2012–13
Lithuania (3)	1	Neptūnas	2014–15
Israel (3)	26	Maccabi Tel Aviv	2001–02, 2002–03, 2003–04, 2004–05, 2005–06, 2006–07, 2007–08, 2008–09, 2009–10, 2010–11, 2011–12, 2012–13, 2013–14, 2014–15, 2015–16, 2016–17, 2017–18, 2018–19, 2019–20, 2020–21, 2021–22, 2022–23, 2023–24, 2024–25, 2025–26, 2026–27
Israel (3)	2	Hapoel Tel Aviv	2025–26, 2026–27
Israel (3)	1	Hapoel Jerusalem	2000–01
Serbia (2)	18	Partizan	2001–02, 2002–03, 2003–04, 2004–05, 2005–06, 2006–07, 2007–08, 2008–09, 2009–10, 2010–11, 2011–12, 2012–13, 2013–14, 2022–23, 2023–24, 2024–25, 2025–26, 2026–27
Serbia (2)	13	Crvena zvezda	2013–14, 2014–15, 2015–16, 2016–17, 2017–18, 2019–20, 2020–21, 2021–22, 2022–23, 2023–24, 2024–25, 2025–26, 2026–27
Slovenia (2)	13	Olimpija	2000–01, 2001–02, 2002–03, 2003–04, 2004–05, 2005–06, 2006–07, 2007–08, 2008–09, 2009–10, 2010–11, 2011–12, 2012–13
Slovenia (2)	2	Krka	2001–02, 2003–04
Belgium (2)	4	Spirou Charleroi	2000–01, 2001–02, 2010–11, 2011–12
Belgium (2)	1	Oostende	2001–02
Montenegro (1)	4	Budućnost	2000–01, 2001–02, 2002–03, 2018–19
United Kingdom (1)	2	London Towers	2000–01, 2001–02
United Arab Emirates (1)	2	Dubai	2025–26, 2026–27
Portugal (1)	1	Ovarense	2000–01
Switzerland (1)	1	Lugano Snakes	2000–01
Ukraine (1)	1	Budivelnyk	2013–14

== Clubs ==
=== By semi-final appearances (FIBA European Champions Cup and EuroLeague Basketball) ===
Team	No. of Appearances	Years in Semi-finals
(Spain) Real Madrid	32	1958, 1961, **1962**, **1963**, **1964**, **1965**, **1967**, **1968**, **1969**, 1970, 1971, 1972, **1974**, **1975**, **1976**, **1978**, **1980**, **1985**, 1993, **1995**, 1996, 2011, **2013**, **2014**, **2015**, 2017, **2018**, 2019, **2022**, **2023**, **2024**, **2026**
(Soviet Union) (Russia) CSKA Moscow	28	**1961**, 1962, **1963**, **1965**, 1966, **1969**, **1970**, **1971**, **1973**, 1996, 2001 FIBA SuproLeague, 2003, 2004, 2005, **2006**, **2007**, **2008**, **2009**, 2010, **2012**, 2013, 2014, 2015, **2016**, 2017, 2018, **2019**, 2021
(Spain) FC Barcelona	18	**1984**, 1989, **1990**, **1991**, 1994, **1996**, **1997**, 2000, **2003**, 2006, 2009, **2010**, 2012, 2013, 2014, **2021**, 2022, 2023
(Israel) Maccabi Tel Aviv	17	**1977**, **1980**, **1981**, **1982**, **1987**, **1988**, **1989**, 1991, **2000**, **2001 FIBA SuproLeague**, 2002, **2004**, **2005**, **2006**, **2008**, **2011**, **2014**
(Greece) Olympiacos	15	**1994**, **1995**, **1997**, 1999, 2009, **2010**, **2012**, **2013**, **2015**, **2017**, 2022, **2023**, 2024, 2025, **2026**
(Greece) Panathinaikos	14	1972, 1994, 1995, **1996**, **2000**, **2001 FIBA SuproLeague**, **2002**, 2005, **2007**, **2009**, **2011**, 2012, **2024**, 2025
(Italy) Varese	11	1965, **1970**, **1971**, **1972**, **1973**, **1974**, **1975**, **1976**, **1977**, **1978**, **1979**
(Italy) Olimpia Milano	9	1964, **1966**, **1967**, 1968, **1983**, **1987**, **1988**, 1992, 2021
(Turkey) Fenerbahçe	8	2015, **2016**, **2017**, **2018**, 2019, 2024, **2025**, 2026
(Spain) Baskonia	6	**2001 Euroleague Basketball**, **2005**, 2006, 2007, 2008, 2016
(Italy) Virtus Bologna	5	**1981**, **1998**, **1999**, **2001 Euroleague Basketball**, **2002**
(Turkey) Anadolu Efes	5	2000, 2001 FIBA SuproLeague, **2019**, **2021**, **2022**
(Soviet Union) Rīgas ASK	4	**1958**, **1959**, **1960**, **1961**
(Socialist Federal Republic of Yugoslavia) (Croatia) Split	4	**1972**, **1989**, **1990**, **1991**
(Czechoslovakia) Brno	4	1963, **1964**, **1968**, 1969
(Italy) Treviso	4	**1993**, 1998, 2002, **2003**
(Czechoslovakia) USK Praha	4	**1966**, 1967, 1970, 1971
(Socialist Federal Republic of Yugoslavia) (Federal Republic of Yugoslavia) (Serbia) Partizan	4	1988, **1992**, 1998, 2010
(Italy) Mens Sana 1871	4	2003, 2004, 2008, 2011
(Soviet Union) Dinamo Tbilisi	3	**1960**, **1962**, 1963
(Italy) Cantù	3	1976, **1982**, **1983**
(Lithuania) Žalgiris	3	**1986**, **1999**, 2018
(Greece) AEK	3	1966, **1998**, 2001 Euroleague Basketball
(France) Limoges CSP	3	1990, **1993**, 1995
(Italy) Fortitudo Bologna	3	1999, 2001 Euroleague Basketball, **2004**
(Socialist Federal Republic of Yugoslavia) OKK Beograd	3	1959, 1964, 1965
(Socialist Federal Republic of Yugoslavia) (Slovenia) Olimpija	3	1962, 1967, 1997
(Greece) Aris	3	1988, 1989, 1990
(Bulgaria) Academic	2	**1958**, **1959**
(Socialist Federal Republic of Yugoslavia) (Croatia) Cibona	2	**1985**, **1986**
(Spain) Joventut Badalona	2	**1992**, **1994**
(Socialist Federal Republic of Yugoslavia) (Croatia) Zadar	2	1968, 1975
(France) ASVEL	2	1976, 1997
(France) AS Monaco Basket	2	2023, **2025**
(Socialist Federal Republic of Yugoslavia) Bosna	1	**1979**
(Italy) Virtus Roma	1	**1984**
(Hungary) Budapesti Honvéd	1	1958
(Poland) Lech Poznań	1	1959
(Poland) Polonia Warszawa	1	1960
(Czechoslovakia) Slovan Orbis Praha	1	1960
(Romania) Steaua București	1	1961
(Belgium) Standard Liège	1	1969
(Socialist Federal Republic of Yugoslavia) Crvena zvezda	1	1973
(Socialist Federal Republic of Yugoslavia) Radnički Belgrade	1	1974
(Italy) Victoria Libertas	1	1991
(Spain) Estudiantes	1	1992
(Greece) PAOK	1	1993
(Spain) Málaga	1	2007
(Russia) Lokomotiv Kuban	1	2016
(Spain) Valencia	1	2026

Team in **Bold**	=	Finalist team in season

== EuroLeague Final Four ==
The history of the EuroLeague Final Four system, which was permanently introduced in the 1987–88 season.

=== By season ===
Season	1st Place	2nd Place	3rd Place	4th Place
1988	(Italy) Tracer Milano	(Israel) Maccabi Elite Tel Aviv	(Socialist Federal Republic of Yugoslavia) Partizan	(Greece) Aris
1989	(Socialist Federal Republic of Yugoslavia) Jugoplastika	(Israel) Maccabi Elite Tel Aviv	(Greece) Aris	(Spain) FC Barcelona
1990	(Socialist Federal Republic of Yugoslavia) Jugoplastika	(Spain) FC Barcelona Banca Catalana	(France) Limoges CSP	(Greece) Aris
1991	(Socialist Federal Republic of Yugoslavia) POP 84	(Spain) FC Barcelona Banca Catalana	(Israel) Maccabi Elite Tel Aviv	(Italy) Scavolini Pesaro
1992	(Socialist Federal Republic of Yugoslavia) Partizan	(Spain) Montigalà Joventut	(Italy) Philips Milano	(Spain) Estudiantes Caja Postal
1993	(France) Limoges CSP	(Italy) Benetton Treviso	(Greece) PAOK	(Spain) Real Madrid Teka
1994	(Spain) 7up Joventut	(Greece) Olympiacos	(Greece) Panathinaikos	(Spain) FC Barcelona Banca Catalana
1995	(Spain) Real Madrid Teka	(Greece) Olympiacos	(Greece) Panathinaikos	(France) Limoges CSP
1996	(Greece) Panathinaikos	(Spain) FC Barcelona Banca Catalana	(Russia) CSKA Moscow	(Spain) Real Madrid Teka
1997	(Greece) Olympiacos	(Spain) FC Barcelona Banca Catalana	(Slovenia) Smelt Olimpija	(France) ASVEL
1998	(Italy) Kinder Bologna	(Greece) AEK	(Italy) Benetton Treviso	(Federal Republic of Yugoslavia) Partizan Zepter
1999	(Lithuania) Žalgiris	(Italy) Kinder Bologna	(Greece) Olympiacos	(Italy) Teamsystem Bologna
2000	(Greece) Panathinaikos	(Israel) Maccabi Elite Tel Aviv	(Turkey) Efes Pilsen	(Spain) FC Barcelona
2001	(Israel) Maccabi Elite Tel Aviv	(Greece) Panathinaikos	(Turkey) Efes Pilsen	(Russia) CSKA Moscow
2001	(Italy) Kinder Bologna	(Spain) Tau Cerámica	(Greece) AEK, (Italy) Paf Wennington Bologna	
2002	(Greece) Panathinaikos	(Italy) Kinder Bologna	(Italy) Benetton Treviso, (Israel) Maccabi Elite Tel Aviv	
2003	(Spain) FC Barcelona	(Italy) Benetton Treviso	(Italy) Montepaschi Siena	(Russia) CSKA Moscow
2004	(Israel) Maccabi Elite Tel Aviv	(Italy) Skipper Bologna	(Russia) CSKA Moscow	(Italy) Montepaschi Siena
2005	(Israel) Maccabi Elite Tel Aviv	(Spain) Tau Cerámica	(Greece) Panathinaikos	(Russia) CSKA Moscow
2006	(Russia) CSKA Moscow	(Israel) Maccabi Elite Tel Aviv	(Spain) Tau Cerámica	(Spain) Winterthur FC Barcelona
2007	(Greece) Panathinaikos	(Russia) CSKA Moscow	(Spain) Unicaja	(Spain) Tau Cerámica
2008	(Russia) CSKA Moscow	(Israel) Maccabi Elite Tel Aviv	(Italy) Montepaschi Siena	(Spain) Tau Cerámica
2009	(Greece) Panathinaikos	(Russia) CSKA Moscow	(Spain) Regal FC Barcelona	(Greece) Olympiacos
2010	(Spain) Regal FC Barcelona	(Greece) Olympiacos	(Russia) CSKA Moscow	(Serbia) Partizan
2011	(Greece) Panathinaikos	(Israel) Maccabi Electra Tel Aviv	(Italy) Montepaschi Siena	(Spain) Real Madrid
2012	(Greece) Olympiacos	(Russia) CSKA Moscow	(Spain) FC Barcelona Regal	(Greece) Panathinaikos
2013	(Greece) Olympiacos	(Spain) Real Madrid	(Russia) CSKA Moscow	(Spain) FC Barcelona Regal
2014	(Israel) Maccabi Electra Tel Aviv	(Spain) Real Madrid	(Spain) FC Barcelona	(Russia) CSKA Moscow
2015	(Spain) Real Madrid	(Greece) Olympiacos	(Russia) CSKA Moscow	(Turkey) Fenerbahçe Ülker
2016	(Russia) CSKA Moscow	(Turkey) Fenerbahçe	(Russia) Lokomotiv Kuban	(Spain) Laboral Kutxa
2017	(Turkey) Fenerbahçe	(Greece) Olympiacos	(Russia) CSKA Moscow	(Spain) Real Madrid
2018	(Spain) Real Madrid	(Turkey) Fenerbahçe Doğuş	(Lithuania) Žalgiris	(Russia) CSKA Moscow
2019	(Russia) CSKA Moscow	(Turkey) Anadolu Efes	(Spain) Real Madrid	(Turkey) Fenerbahçe Beko
2020	Cancelled following COVID-19 pandemic			
2021	(Turkey) Anadolu Efes	(Spain) FC Barcelona	(Italy) EA7 Emporio Armani Milan	(Russia) CSKA Moscow
2022	(Turkey) Anadolu Efes	(Spain) Real Madrid	(Spain) FC Barcelona	(Greece) Olympiacos
2023	(Spain) Real Madrid	(Greece) Olympiacos	(France) AS Monaco	(Spain) FC Barcelona
2024	(Greece) Panathinaikos	(Spain) Real Madrid	(Greece) Olympiacos	(Turkey) Fenerbahçe Beko
2025	(Turkey) Fenerbahçe Beko	(France) AS Monaco	(Greece) Olympiacos	(Greece) Panathinaikos
2026	(Greece) Olympiacos	(Spain) Real Madrid	(Turkey) Fenerbahçe Beko, (Spain) Valencia Basket	

=== Performance by club ===
Club	1st	2nd	3rd	4th	Total
(Greece) Panathinaikos	7	1	3	2	13
(Greece) Olympiacos	4	6	3	2	15
(Israel) Maccabi Tel Aviv	4	6	2	–	12
(Spain) Real Madrid	4	5	1	4	14
(Russia) CSKA Moscow	4	3	6	6	19
(Socialist Federal Republic of Yugoslavia) (Croatia) Split	3	–	–	–	3
(Spain) Barcelona	2	5	4	6	17
(Italy) Virtus Bologna	2	2	–	–	4
(Turkey) Efes Pilsen	2	1	2	–	5
(Turkey) Fenerbahçe	2	2	1	3	8
(Socialist Federal Republic of Yugoslavia) (Croatia) Cibona	2	–	–	–	2
(Spain) Joventut Badalona	1	1	–	–	2
(Italy) Olimpia Milano	1	–	2	–	3
(Socialist Federal Republic of Yugoslavia) (Federal Republic of Yugoslavia) (Serbia) Partizan	1	–	1	2	4
(France) Limoges CSP	1	–	1	1	3
(Lithuania) Žalgiris	1	–	1	–	2
(Italy) Treviso	–	2	2	–	4
(Spain) Baskonia	–	2	1	3	6
(Italy) Fortitudo Bologna	–	1	1	1	3
(Greece) AEK	–	1	1	–	2
(France) AS Monaco	–	1	1	–	2
(Italy) Mens Sana	–	–	3	1	4
(Greece) Aris	–	–	1	2	3
(Greece) PAOK	–	–	1	–	1
(Slovenia) Olimpija	–	–	1	–	1
(Spain) Málaga	–	–	1	–	1
(Russia) Lokomotiv Kuban	–	–	1	–	1
(Spain) Valencia Basket	–	–	1	–	1
(Italy) Victoria Libertas	–	–	–	1	1
(Spain) Estudiantes	–	–	–	1	1
(France) ASVEL	–	–	–	1	1
