= List of EuroLeague-winning head coaches =

The list of EuroLeague-winning head coaches shows all of the head coaches that have won the EuroLeague championship. The EuroLeague is the European-wide top-tier level professional basketball club competition. The competition was originally called the FIBA European Champions Cup, or simply European Champions Cup.

== Key ==
†	Elected into the Naismith Memorial Basketball Hall of Fame as a coach
*	Elected into the FIBA Hall of Fame
†*	Member of both the FIBA Hall of Fame and the Naismith Memorial Basketball Hall of Fame.

== List ==
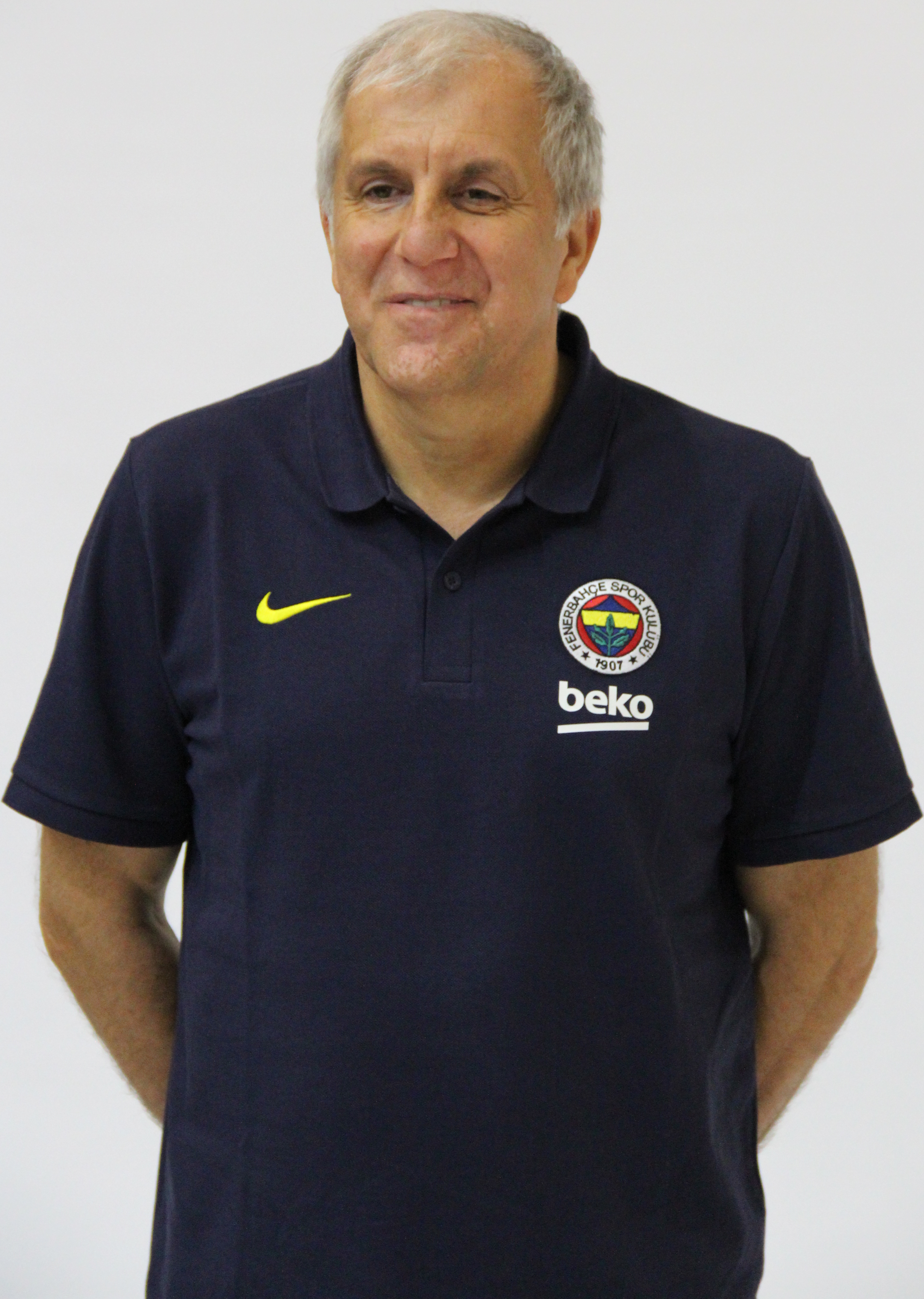
Željko Obradović won the title nine times in his career.

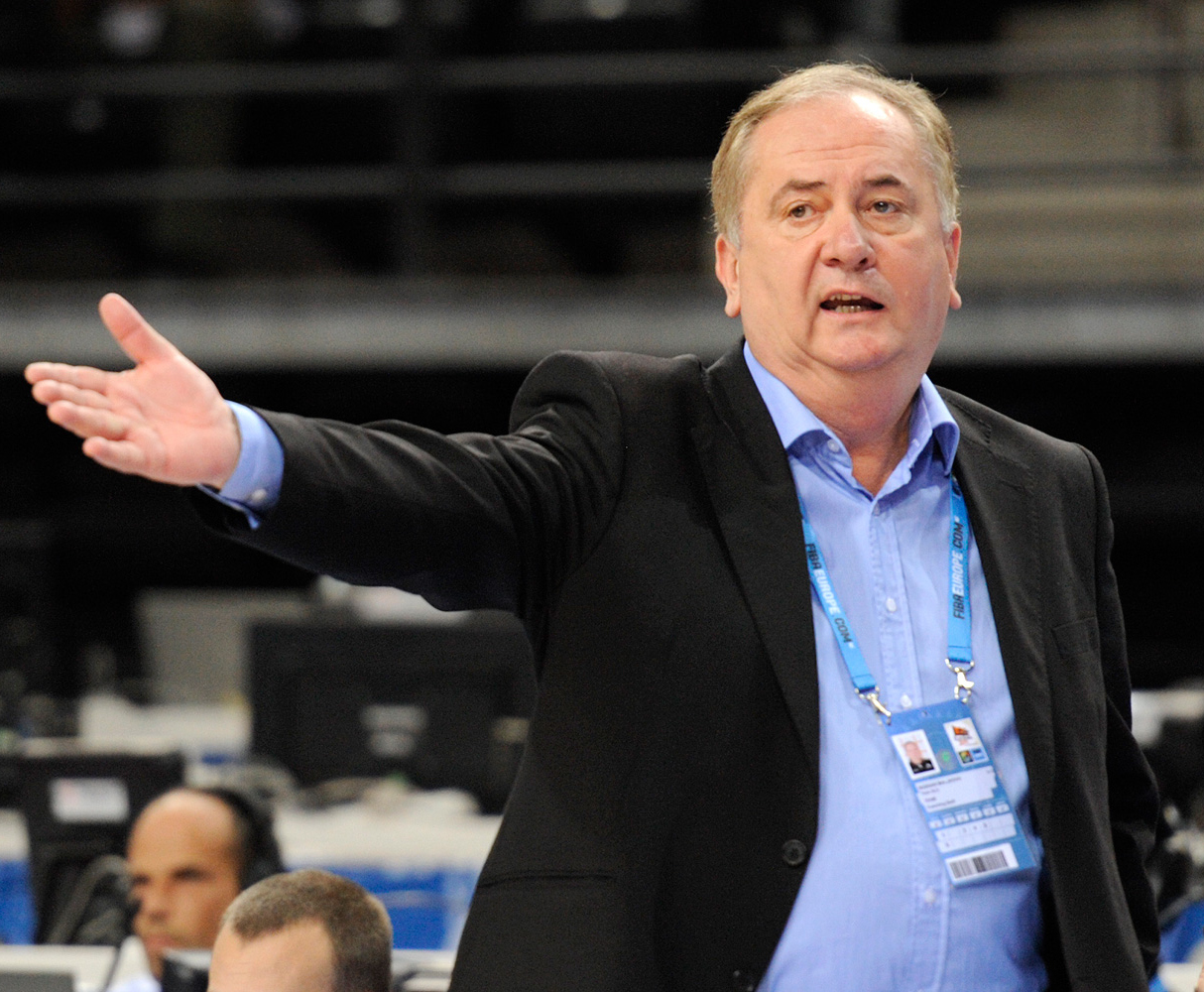
Božidar Maljković won four titles with three different clubs.

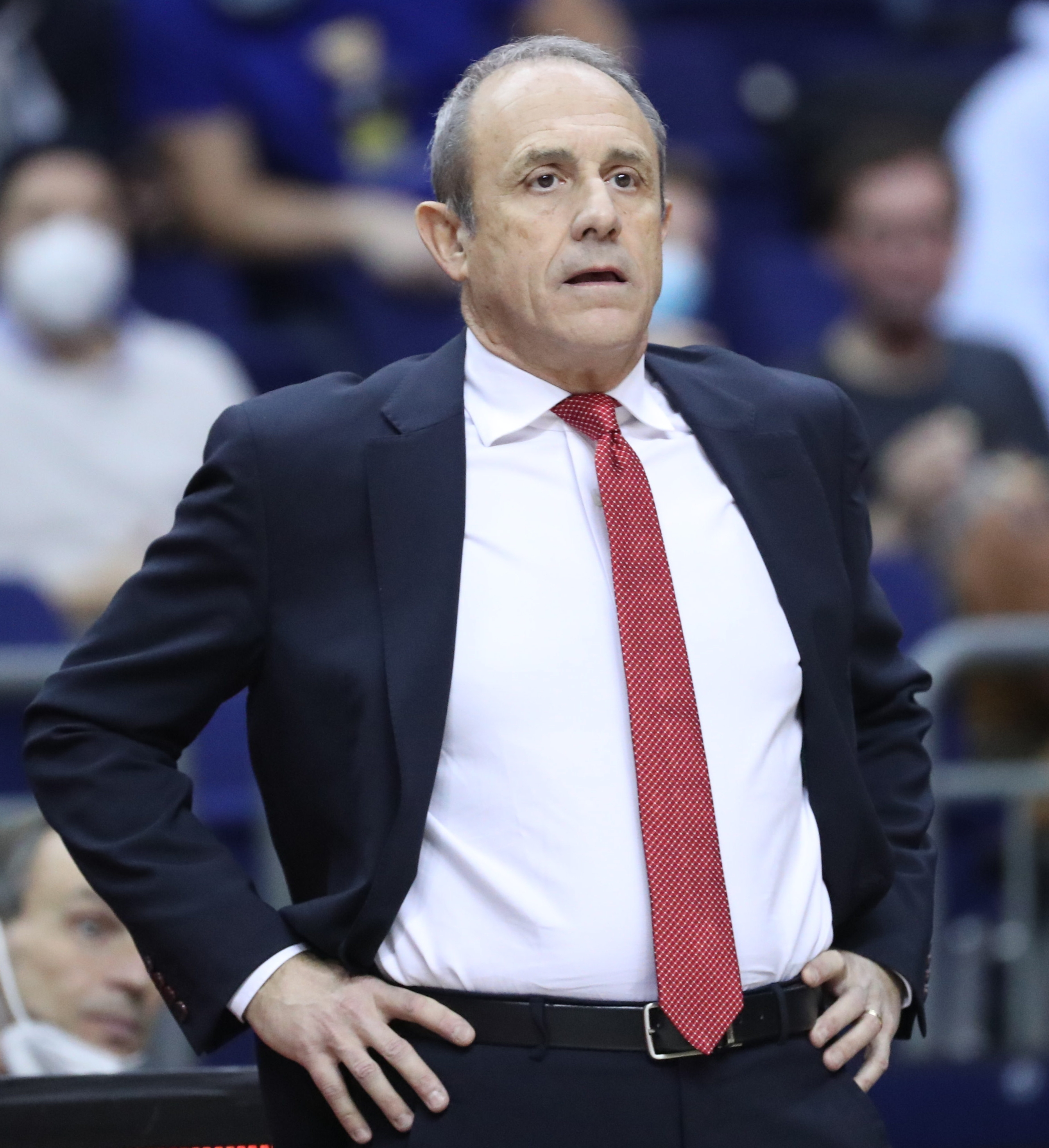
Ettore Messina won four titles with two different clubs.

Season	Head coach	Winning team
1958	(Soviet Union) Alexander Gomelsky†*	(Soviet Union) Rīgas ASK
1958–59	(Soviet Union) Alexander Gomelsky†*	(Soviet Union) Rīgas ASK
1959–60	(Soviet Union) Alexander Gomelsky†*	(Soviet Union) Rīgas ASK
1960–61	(Soviet Union) Evgeny Alekseev	(Soviet Union) CSKA Moscow
1961–62	(Soviet Union) Otar Korkia	(Soviet Union) Dinamo Tbilisi
1962–63	(Soviet Union) Evgeny Alekseev	(Soviet Union) CSKA Moscow
1963–64	(Spain) Joaquín Hernández	(Spain) Real Madrid
1964–65	(Spain) Pedro Ferrándiz†*	(Spain) Real Madrid
1965–66	(Italy) Cesare Rubini†*	(Italy) Simmenthal Milano
1966–67	(Spain) Pedro Ferrándiz†*	(Spain) Real Madrid
1967–68	(Spain) Pedro Ferrándiz†*	(Spain) Real Madrid
1968–69	(Soviet Union) Armenak Alachachian	(Soviet Union) CSKA Moscow
1969–70	(Socialist Federal Republic of Yugoslavia) Aca Nikolić†*	(Italy) Ignis Varese
1970–71	(Soviet Union) Alexander Gomelsky†*	(Soviet Union) CSKA Moscow
1971–72	(Socialist Federal Republic of Yugoslavia) Aca Nikolić†*	(Italy) Ignis Varese
1972–73	(Socialist Federal Republic of Yugoslavia) Aca Nikolić†*	(Italy) Ignis Varese
1973–74	(Spain) Pedro Ferrándiz†*	(Spain) Real Madrid
1974–75	(Italy) Sandro Gamba†	(Italy) Ignis Varese
1975–76	(Italy) Sandro Gamba†	(Italy) Mobilgirgi Varese
1976–77	(Israel) Ralph Klein	(Israel) Maccabi Tel Aviv
1977–78	(Spain) Lolo Sainz	(Spain) Real Madrid
1978–79	(Socialist Federal Republic of Yugoslavia) Bogdan Tanjević*	(Socialist Federal Republic of Yugoslavia) Bosna
1979–80	(Spain) Lolo Sainz	(Spain) Real Madrid
1980–81	(United States) Rudy D'Amico	(Israel) Maccabi Tel Aviv
1981–82	(Italy) Valerio Bianchini	(Italy) Squibb Cantù
1982–83	(Italy) Giancarlo Primo	(Italy) Ford Cantù
1983–84	(Italy) Valerio Bianchini	(Italy) Banco di Roma
1984–85	(Socialist Federal Republic of Yugoslavia) Mirko Novosel†*	(Socialist Federal Republic of Yugoslavia) Cibona
1985–86	(Socialist Federal Republic of Yugoslavia) Željko Pavličević	(Socialist Federal Republic of Yugoslavia) Cibona
1986–87	(United States) Dan Peterson	(Italy) Tracer Milano
1987–88	(Italy) Franco Casalini	(Italy) Tracer Milano
1988–89	(Socialist Federal Republic of Yugoslavia) Božidar Maljković	(Socialist Federal Republic of Yugoslavia) Jugoplastika
1989–90	(Socialist Federal Republic of Yugoslavia) Božidar Maljković	(Socialist Federal Republic of Yugoslavia) Jugoplastika
1990–91	(Socialist Federal Republic of Yugoslavia) Željko Pavličević	(Socialist Federal Republic of Yugoslavia) POP 84
1991–92	(Federal Republic of Yugoslavia) Željko Obradović	(Federal Republic of Yugoslavia) Partizan
1992–93	(Federal Republic of Yugoslavia) Božidar Maljković	(France) Limoges CSP
1993–94	(Federal Republic of Yugoslavia) Željko Obradović	(Spain) 7up Joventut
1994–95	(Federal Republic of Yugoslavia) Željko Obradović	(Spain) Real Madrid Teka
1995–96	(Federal Republic of Yugoslavia) Božidar Maljković	(Greece) Panathinaikos
1996–97	(Federal Republic of Yugoslavia) Dušan Ivković*	(Greece) Olympiacos
1997–98	(Italy) Ettore Messina*	(Italy) Kinder Bologna
1998–99	(Lithuania) Jonas Kazlauskas	(Lithuania) Žalgiris
1999–2000	(Federal Republic of Yugoslavia) Željko Obradović	(Greece) Panathinaikos
2000–01^{(FIBA SuproLeague)}	(Israel) Pini Gershon	(Israel) Maccabi Tel Aviv
2000–01	(Italy) Ettore Messina*	(Italy) Kinder Bologna
2001–02	(Federal Republic of Yugoslavia) Željko Obradović	(Greece) Panathinaikos
2002–03	(Serbia and Montenegro) Svetislav Pešić*	(Spain) FC Barcelona
2003–04	(Israel) Pini Gershon	(Israel) Maccabi Tel Aviv
2004–05	(Israel) Pini Gershon	(Israel) Maccabi Tel Aviv
2005–06	(Italy) Ettore Messina*	(Russia) CSKA Moscow
2006–07	(Serbia) Željko Obradović	(Greece) Panathinaikos
2007–08	(Italy) Ettore Messina*	(Russia) CSKA Moscow
2008–09	(Serbia) Željko Obradović	(Greece) Panathinaikos
2009–10	(Spain) Xavi Pascual	(Spain) Regal FC Barcelona
2010–11	(Serbia) Željko Obradović	(Greece) Panathinaikos
2011–12	(Serbia) Dušan Ivković*	(Greece) Olympiacos
2012–13	(Greece) Georgios Bartzokas	(Greece) Olympiacos
2013–14	(Israel) David Blatt	(Israel) Maccabi Tel Aviv
2014–15	(Spain) Pablo Laso	(Spain) Real Madrid
2015–16	(Greece) Dimitrios Itoudis	(Russia) CSKA Moscow
2016–17	(Serbia) Željko Obradović	(Turkey) Fenerbahçe
2017–18	(Spain) Pablo Laso	(Spain) Real Madrid
2018–19	(Greece) Dimitrios Itoudis	(Russia) CSKA Moscow
2019–20	Cancelled due to COVID-19 pandemic	
2020–21	(Turkey) Ergin Ataman	(Turkey) Anadolu Efes
2021–22	(Turkey) Ergin Ataman	(Turkey) Anadolu Efes
2022–23	(Spain) Chus Mateo	(Spain) Real Madrid
2023–24	(Turkey) Ergin Ataman	(Greece) Panathinaikos
2024–25	(Lithuania) Šarūnas Jasikevičius	(Turkey) Fenerbahçe
2025–26	(Greece) Georgios Bartzokas	(Greece) Olympiacos

== Multiple winners ==
The following is a list of head coaches with multiple EuroLeague titles. Number in parentheses indicates how many title are won by a one club.

Number	Head coach	Winning team(s)	First	Last
9	(Federal Republic of Yugoslavia) (Serbia) Željko Obradović	(Federal Republic of Yugoslavia) Partizan, (Spain) Joventut Badalona, (Spain) Real Madrid, (Greece) Panathinaikos (5), (Turkey) Fenerbahçe	1992	2017
4	(Italy) Ettore Messina	(Italy) Virtus Bologna (2), (Russia) CSKA Moscow (2)	1998	2008
4	(Socialist Federal Republic of Yugoslavia) (Federal Republic of Yugoslavia) Božidar Maljković	(Socialist Federal Republic of Yugoslavia) Split (2), (France) Limoges CSP, (Greece) Panathinaikos	1989	1996
4	(Spain) Pedro Ferrándiz	(Spain) Real Madrid	1965	1974
4	(Soviet Union) Alexander Gomelsky	(Soviet Union) Rīgas ASK (3), (Soviet Union) CSKA Moscow	1958	1971
3	(Israel) Pini Gershon	(Israel) Maccabi Tel Aviv	2001	2005
3	(Socialist Federal Republic of Yugoslavia) Aca Nikolić	(Italy) Varese	1970	1973
3	(Turkey) Ergin Ataman	(Turkey) Anadolu Efes (2), (Greece) Panathinaikos	2021	2024
2	(Socialist Federal Republic of Yugoslavia) Željko Pavličević	(Socialist Federal Republic of Yugoslavia) Cibona, (Socialist Federal Republic of Yugoslavia) Split	1986	1991
2	(Federal Republic of Yugoslavia) (Serbia) Dušan Ivković	(Greece) Olympiacos	1997	2012
2	(Italy) Valerio Bianchini	(Italy) Cantù, (Italy) Virtus Roma	1982	1984
2	(Spain) Lolo Sainz	(Spain) Real Madrid	1978	1980
2	(Italy) Sandro Gamba	(Italy) Varese	1975	1976
2	(Soviet Union) Evgeny Alekseev	(Soviet Union) CSKA Moscow	1961	1963
2	(Spain) Pablo Laso	(Spain) Real Madrid (2)	2015	2018
2	(Greece) Dimitrios Itoudis	(Russia) CSKA Moscow (2)	2016	2019
2	(Greece) Georgios Bartzokas	(Greece) Olympiacos (2)	2013	2026

== Winners by country ==
The following is a list of current countries where head coaches came from. Number in parentheses indicates how many title are won by a single coach, if there are more than one.

Number	Country	Coach(es)	First	Last
19	Serbia	Željko Obradović (9), Božidar Maljković (4), Aca Nikolić (3), Dušan Ivković (2), Svetislav Pešić	1970	2017
11	Italy	Ettore Messina (4), Valerio Bianchini (2), Sandro Gamba (2), Cesare Rubini, Giancarlo Primo, Franco Casalini	1966	2008
11	Spain	Pedro Ferrándiz (4), Pablo Laso (2), Lolo Sainz (2), Chus Mateo, Xavi Pascual, Joaquín Hernández	1964	2023
6	Russia	Alexander Gomelsky (4); Evgenii Alexeev (2)	1958	1971
5	Israel	Pini Gershon (3), Ralph Klein, David Blatt	1977	2014
4	Greece	Dimitrios Itoudis (2), Georgios Bartzokas (2)	2013	2026
3	Croatia	Željko Pavličević (2), Mirko Novosel	1985	1991
3	Turkey	Ergin Ataman	2021	2024
2	United States	Rudy D'Amico, Dan Peterson	1981	1987
2	Lithuania	Jonas Kazlauskas, Šarūnas Jasikevičius	1999	2025
1	Montenegro	Bogdan Tanjević	1979	
1	Armenia	Armenak Alachachian	1969	
1	Georgia	Otar Korkia	1962	

== See also ==
- Alexander Gomelsky EuroLeague Coach of the Year
- List of EuroCup-winning head coaches
- List of European Cup and UEFA Champions League winning managers
