= Valerio Bianchini =

Italian professional basketball coach

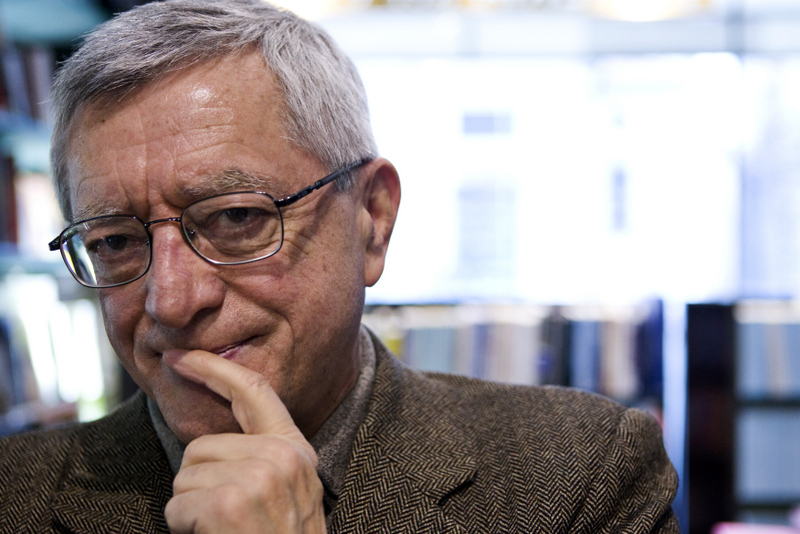
- Valerio Bianchini (2014)

Personal information
- Born: July 22, 1943 (age 83) Torre Pallavicina, Italy
- Position: Coach

Career history
- 1974–1979: Stella Azzurra Roma
- 1979–1982: Cantù
- 1982–1985: Virtus Roma
- 1985–1987: Italy
- 1987–1989: Victoria Libertas Pesaro
- 1989–1991: Virtus Roma
- 1992–1993: Mens Sana
- 1993–1996: Victoria Libertas Pesaro
- 1997–1998: Fortitudo Bologna
- 1999: Virtus Roma
- 1999–2000: Varèse
- 2000: Olimpia Milano
- 2002–2003: Virtus Bologna
- 2005–2006: Blue Stars
- 2007–2008: Varèse

Career highlights
- FIBA Intercontinental Cup champion (1984); 2× EuroLeague champion (1982, 1984); FIBA European Cup champion (1981); 3× Italian League champion (1981, 1983, 1988); Italian Cup winner (1998); Italian Basketball Hall of Fame (2013)

Valerio Bianchini (born July 22, 1943) is an Italian professional basketball coach. He was the first coach in Italian basketball to win three championship titles with three clubs (Cantù, Virtus Roma and Victoria Libertas Pesaro). His nickname is "Il vate" ("The prophet").

== Coaching career ==
In 1974, Bianchini began his coaching career by Stella Azzurra Roma where he stayed for five seasons. The first season came out 12th in the Serie A1, also participating with the team at the FIBA Korać Cup where they arrived until the Group stage of 16. The next two seasons were his best in Stella Azzurra. In 1976 he led his team to fourth place in the regular season and won the participation rights in the Korać Cup of the next year. In the season 1976–77 the European obligations after it cost the team came in eighth in the championship. However Valerio Bianchini led the compact team of Stella Azzurra in a frantic march (undefeated for 6 consecutive games) in Korać Cup that was only interrupted in the semifinals against the subsequent winner Jugoplastika Split. In his last year with the team despite the 4th place of the regular season was not able to overcome the obstacle of Billy Milano in the playoff quarterfinals.

The summer of 1979 he was given the great opportunity to work in the north and the small city of Cantù where the local basketball club, the previous six years had terrorized throughout Europe with victories in the European competitions away from the champions cup. Stayed there three years and each one turned out better than the last. In 1979–80 led Gabetti Cantù despite to two disadvantages in the final of the Championship where they lost from Sinudyne Bologna, while in the FIBA European Cup Winners' Cup lost the title -after three years of continuous wins- after a great final in Milan towards the superpower of the European Basketball in the former decade, Emerson Varèse. In 1981 he lived the best moments of his coaching career after having led Squibb Cantù at the top of Serie A for the third and last time in its history to date, while returned to the Cup Winners' Cup final (fifth consecutive time) where his team defeated FC Barcelona. The next and his final season at Cantù (1981–82), he became the third Italian coach who won the FIBA European Champions Cup after Cesare Rubini and Sandro Gamba.

Ηaving won everything with the great team of Pallacanestro Cantù, he was found for the next three years at Rome as head coach of Virtus with a view to driving the upper echelons of the Italian League and Europe. The good results came just after the first year and Virtus won the league title for the first and only time in its history. Bianchini, built very quickly a team that seemed to be able to assert with claim the trophy of European Champions. Indeed, the next year (1983–84) Banco di Roma Virtus reached easily in semifinals group stage (top 6) and managed to place, in the second position of the group, which gave the right to fight in the great final against FC Barcelona which was considered the absolute favorite. The European Champions second title was a fact for the "prophet". In season 1984–85 all things looked that they could replicate these successes of the past two years. Virtus came out first in the regular season and fell victim surprising since been eliminated in the first round of Playoffs from Scavolini Pesaro. In Europe, the team was again in the semi-final group stage, but did not achieve anything more than the fifth and penultimate position above the other Italian team of Granarolo Bologna.

Having completed a stunning six years in grand lobby of the Italian and European basketball, Valerio Bianchini accepted the proposal of the Italian basketball federation (FIP) and led the national team for the next two years. In the 1986 FIBA World Championship in Spain, Italy ranked sixth while in the Eurobasket of Athens in June 1987 it was undefeated until the quarterfinals where it was defeated by the Greece of Nikos Galis and Panagiotis Giannakis.

In 1987 he joined Scavolini Pesaro and create a team that was highly competitive both in Serie A and in European competitions that took place in the coming years. The championship of 1988 came fatally added to his rich trophy. Despite his good job in Pesaro, returned for two years in Rome and in Virtus without being able to repeat the feat of his first pass. After the brackets of Siena returned to Scavolini for the three years 1993–1996. The second place in the league brought him after almost ten years in the European Championship. There after tough competition Scavolini took fourth place after teams such as Panathinaikos, Real Madrid and CSKA Moscow and found claiming to eight-fold, the entry of the Final Four of Zaragoza towards French Limoges of Božidar Maljković and Michael Young.

He spent the last of the good days at the high level, in Teamsystem Bologna where for one year he was fortunate to coach great players of European and world basketball as Carlton Myers, Dominique Wilkins and David Rivers. The Italian Cup of 1998 was the last title that he won. From 1999 onwards his career entered the phase of decline since the various clubs undertook training, had only the (historical) name but not the grace or more correctly the money.

== Career achievements and awards ==
- FIBA European Champions Cup: 2 (with Cantù: 1981–82, and Virtus Roma: 1983–84)
- FIBA European Cup Winners' Cup: 1 (with Cantù: 1980–81)
- FIBA Intercontinental Cup: 1 (with Virtus Roma: 1984)
- Italian League: 3 (with Cantù: 1980–81, Virtus Roma: 1982–83 and Victoria Libertas Pesaro: 1987–88)
- Italian Cup: 1 (with Fortitudo Bologna: 1997–98)
- Italian Basketball Hall of Fame: (2013)

== See also ==
- List of EuroLeague-winning head coaches
