= List of EuroCup-winning head coaches =

The list of EuroCup-winning head coaches shows all of the head coaches that have won the EuroCup championship. The EuroCup is the European-wide 2nd-tier level men's professional basketball club competition. The competition was founded under the name the ULEB Cup.

== Key ==
†	Elected into the Naismith Memorial Basketball Hall of Fame as a coach
*	Elected into the FIBA Hall of Fame
†*	Member of both the FIBA Hall of Fame and the Naismith Memorial Basketball Hall of Fame.

== List ==
Season	Head coach	Winning team	Ref.
2002–03	(Spain) Paco Olmos	(Spain) Pamesa Valencia	
2003–04	(Israel) Sharon Drucker	(Israel) Hapoel Jerusalem	
2004–05	(Slovenia) Tomo Mahorič	(Lithuania) Lietuvos rytas	
2005–06	(Serbia and Montenegro) Dušan Ivković*	(Russia) Dynamo Moscow	
2006–07	(Spain) Joan Plaza	(Spain) Real Madrid	
2007–08	(Spain) Aíto García Reneses	(Spain) DKV Joventut	
2008–09	(Lithuania) Rimas Kurtinaitis	(Lithuania) Lietuvos rytas	
2009–10	(Croatia) Neven Spahija	(Spain) Power Electronics Valencia	
2010–11	(Russia) Evgeniy Pashutin	(Russia) UNICS	
2011–12	(Lithuania) Rimas Kurtinaitis	(Russia) Khimki	
2012–13	(Russia) Evgeniy Pashutin	(Russia) Lokomotiv Kuban	
2013–14	(Croatia) Velimir Perasović	(Spain) Valencia Basket	
2014–15	(Lithuania) Rimas Kurtinaitis	(Russia) Khimki	
2015–16	(Turkey) Ergin Ataman	(Turkey) Galatasaray Odeabank	
2016–17	(Spain) Joan Plaza	(Spain) Unicaja	
2017–18	(United States) (Israel) David Blatt	(Turkey) Darüşşafaka	
2018–19	(Spain) Jaume Ponsarnau	(Spain) Valencia Basket	
2019–20	Cancelled due to the COVID-19 pandemic.		
2020–21	(Montenegro) Zvezdan Mitrović	(France) AS Monaco	
2021–22	(Italy) Sergio Scariolo	(Italy) Virtus Segafredo Bologna	
2022–23	(Slovenia) Jaka Lakovic	(Spain) CB Gran Canaria	
2023–24	(Finland) Tuomas Iisalo	(France) Paris Basketball	
2024–25	(Greece) Dimitrios Itoudis	(Israel) Hapoel Tel Aviv	

== Multiple winners ==
Number	Head coach	Winning team(s)	First	Last
3	(Lithuania) Rimas Kurtinaitis	(Lithuania) Lietuvos rytas, (Russia) Khimki (2)	2009	2015
2	(Spain) Joan Plaza	(Spain) Real Madrid, (Spain) Unicaja	2007	2017
2	(Russia) Evgeniy Pashutin	(Russia) UNICS, (Russia) Lokomotiv Kuban	2011	2013

== See also ==
- EuroCup Basketball Coach of the Year
- List of EuroLeague-winning head coaches
