= Franco Casalini =

Italian basketball coach (1952–2022)

Franco Casalini (1 January 1952 – 28 July 2022) was an Italian basketball coach. He was mainly known from his successful passage through the legendary team of Olimpia Milano in the late 1980s.

== Career ==
Casalini, after practicing as a basketball player, he passes to coach, in 1971, in the ranks of the Social Osa, the historic Milan team which refers to the oratory of the Salesians of Milan. In 1972, after obtaining excellent results with the students team, winning the tournament City of Sesto, he is called by Simmenthal to work with the youth department of the club. Casalini begins so a period of 18 years that will continuously be part of Olimpia Milano. As a youth coach he will lead Olimpia to win four league titles, including Cadet and Junior. Having joined Pippo Faina, and after spending nine years to serve as assistant to Dan Peterson, first in cohabitation with William Roggiani and later as a single voice, he began as a coach just with the Milanese team in 1987–88, winning immediately two international titles, the FIBA Club World Cup in September 1987 and the FIBA European Champions Cup in April 1988 to obtain the repeat for Tracer. In the 1988–89 season he led Philips in the winning of the Italian League although in the European competitions his team was excluded in the semifinals by Wiwa Vismara Cantù. After this promising beginning, Casalini is no longer able to give continuity to his team. The following season the team went out in the final four of the Champions Cup and the second round of the italian league playoffs, against Viola Reggio Calabria. Olimpia replaces him then, the following season with Mike D'Antoni. In 1991–92 he switches to Filanto Forli, but he goes after only eleven days. Then he takes over Virtus Roma from Paolo Di Fonzo: out of the playoffs in 1992–93, despite having reached the 1993 FIBA Korać Cup final (lost just against D'Antoni's Philips Milano) he is replaced by Nevio Ciaralli in 1993–94.

In 1994 he started his career as a commentator in collaboration with Tele +.

In 1996 he became scout for Teamsystem Bologna, task that the next season will play in Milan. His last Italian experience as a coach is the conclusion of the 1997–98 season to Stefanel Milano: after having taken over from Franco Marcelletti, reached the FIBA EuroCup final, by losing it (against Žalgiris), and still went out of the first round of the playoffs.

Casalini has also coached SAV Vacallo, in the Swiss league. In 1999, he won the Swiss Cup after a heated final against FV Lugano Virginio Bernardi, and repeating the success in the same event the following year. Simultaneously it brings Vacallo in the final, but both times was defeated.

In 2003, he was a commentator for Sky Sports. In 2011, he became director of site content for Euroleague.tv.

=== Career achievements and awards ===
- FIBA European Champions Cup: 1 (with Olimpia Milano: 1987–88)
- Italian League: 1 (with Olimpia Milano: 1988–89)
- Swiss Cup: 2 (with SAV Vacallo: 1998–99, 1999–00)

== See also ==
- List of EuroLeague-winning head coaches
