= Rudy D'Amico =

Personal information
- Born: August 18, 1940 (age 86) Queens, New York, U.S.

Career information
- High school: Newtown (Queens, New York)
- College: Seattle (1960–1961)
- Coaching career: 1967–1999

Career history

Coaching
- 1967–1977: Brooklyn College
- 1979–1980: Mulhouse
- 1980–1981: Maccabi Tel Aviv
- 1981–1982: Brindisi
- 1982–1983: Trieste
- 1983: Fortitudo Bologna
- 1984–1985: Zaragoza
- 1985–1990: Firenze
- 1991–1992: A.P.U. Udine
- 1998: Montecatini
- 1998–1999: Scaligera Verona

Career highlights
- As head coach: FIBA Intercontinental Cup champion (1980); EuroLeague champion (1981); Israeli League champion (1981); Israeli State Cup winner (1981)

Rudy D'Amico (born August 18, 1940) is a National Basketball Association (NBA) scout, and former college basketball and professional coach. He was the head coach of Maccabi Tel Aviv, and he led them to the FIBA European Champions Cup (EuroLeague) championship in 1981. He scouts for the Orlando Magic.

== Early life ==
D'Amico, the son of Italian-born parents, was born in Queens, New York, grew up in Astoria and attended Newtown High School. He then attended Seattle University, and in 1961 won letters in both basketball and baseball. He also earned a master's degree from New York University.

== Basketball coaching career ==
D'Amico was head basketball coach at Brooklyn College in the Knickerbocker Conference, from 1967 until 1977. In 1973, he coached Brooklyn College to the CUNYAC Basketball Championship, defeating City College.

From 1980 to 1991, he coached professional basketball in Europe and Israel, from 1985 to 1990 with Pallacanestro Firenze of the Italian A League in Florence, Italy. He also coached Zaragoza of the Spanish League, and Bologna in Italy, as well as in the Puerto Rican Superior League. In 1981, he coached the Israeli Super League team, Maccabi Tel Aviv, to the FIBA European Champions Cup (EuroLeague) championship over Synudine Bologna in the Finals.

== Basketball scouting career ==
In 1999, he became the NBA's Cleveland Cavaliers' international scout, advising general manager Jim Paxson. In 2005, he was the NBA European scout of the Cleveland Cavaliers. He then scouted for the Orlando Magic. He has since retired.

== See also ==
- List of EuroLeague-winning head coaches
