= Cesare Rubini =

Italian water polo and basketball player

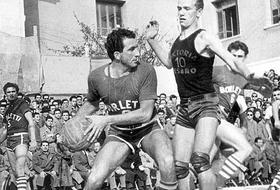
- Rubini (with the basketball in his hands).

Personal information
- Born: 2 November 1923 Trieste, Italy
- Died: 8 February 2011 (aged 87)

Career information
- Playing career: 1948–1957
- Coaching career: 1957–1973

Career history

Playing
- 1948–1957: Olimpia Milano

Coaching
- 1957–1973: Olimpia Milano

Career highlights
- As a player: 6× Italian League champion (1950–1954, 1957); As a head coach: EuroLeague champion (1966); 2× FIBA Saporta Cup champion (1971, 1972); 9× Italian League champion (1958–1960, 1962, 1963, 1965–1967, 1972); Italian Cup winner (1972); FIBA Order of Merit (2002); Italian Basketball Hall of Fame (2006); Walk of Fame of Italian sport (2015)
- Basketball Hall of Fame
- FIBA Hall of Fame
Medals
Men's basketball
Representing Italy
FIBA EuroBasket
Silver medal – second place	1946 Switzerland

Cesare Rubini
- Rubini, circa 1948.

Personal information
- Born: 2 November 1923 Trieste, Italy
- Died: 8 February 2011 (aged 87) Milan, Italy

Sport
- Sport: Water polo

Senior clubs
- Years: Team
- 1947–1948: Società Canottieri Olona
- 1949–1951: Rari Nantes Napoli
- 1952–1956: Rari Nantes Camogli
Medal record
Men's Water Polo
Representing Italy
Olympics
Gold medal – first place	1948 London	National Team
Bronze medal – third place	1952 Helsinki	National Team
European Water Polo Championship
Gold medal – first place	1947 Monaco	National Team
Bronze medal – third place	1954 Italy	National Team

Cesare Rubini (2 November 1923 – 8 February 2011) was an Italian professional basketball player and coach, and a water polo player. He was considered to be one of the greatest European basketball coaches of all time. Rubini was inducted into the Basketball Hall of Fame in 1994, making him the first, and to this day, just one of three Italian basketball figures to receive such an honour, alongside Dino Meneghin and Sandro Gamba. He was also inducted into the International Swimming Hall of Fame in 2000.

In 2002, he was awarded the FIBA Order of Merit. He was inducted into the Italian Basketball Hall of Fame, in 2006. He was also inducted into the FIBA Hall of Fame, in 2013. In 2015, he was inducted into the Walk of Fame of Italian sport.

== Sports biography ==
Rubini started to play basketball for his high school team, in his native Trieste, where he graduated in 1941. The same year, he began to play for Olimpia Milano's junior clubs, the most prestigious Italian League basketball club at that time. However, he had a long-lived passion for water polo: this led him to later become one of the rare world sportsmen to compete at the highest level in two different team sports.

=== Water polo career ===
As a club player-coach, Rubini won 6 Italian national domestic league titles in water polo (1947, 1949, 1950, 1952, 1953, 1955) with Società Canottieri Olona, Rari Nantes Napoli, and Rari Nantes Camogli. He also totaled 84 caps, for the senior Italian water polo national team, 42 of which were as a team captain. He won a gold medal at the 1947 European Water Polo Championship, with the senior Italian national water polo team.

In the meantime, he had also assumed the role of player-coach of the Italian basketball club Olimpia Milano, in 1948; and he was called by the national teams of both sports (basketball and water polo) to play with them. Rubini chose water polo, and he won a gold medal in the sport, at the 1948 Summer Olympic Games, in London, beating the Hungary in the final. With Rubini as a full-time player, Italy could boast what was to be called the "Golden Settebello", one of the most valuable water polo teams ever, which also won a bronze medal at the 1952 Summer Olympics, and at the Turin European Championship of 1954. In both the events, Italy was behind traditional rivals of Yugoslavia and Hungary.

=== Basketball career ===
As a club basketball player-coach, Rubini won 6 Italian national domestic league titles (1950, 1951, 1952, 1953, 1954, 1957) with Olimpia Milano. In 1957, he devoted himself only to the team's head coach role, and he then went on to win 9 more Italian national domestic league titles with Olimpia (1958, 1959, 1960, 1962, 1963, 1965, 1966, 1967, 1972). In those years, he set an unparalleled record of 322 victories, and 28 defeats. Overall, as head coach of the Milan team, Rubini totaled 501 victories, including the FIBA European Champions Cup (EuroLeague) championship in 1966, and two (European 2nd-tier) level FIBA European Cup Winners' Cups (FIBA Saporta Cup) titles, in 1971 and 1972: these were the first European-wide victories of Italian basketball clubs. He also won the Italian Cup, in 1972.

As a player, Rubini won a silver medal with the senior Italian national basketball team, at the 1946 FIBA EuroBasket, which was held in Geneva. Later, as the delegation head of the senior Italian national basketball team, Rubini also took part in the first international victories of Italy: these include the silver medal at the 1980 Summer Olympic Games. At the FIBA EuroBasket, Italy finished first at the 1983 FIBA EuroBasket, in Nantes, finished third at the 1985 FIBA EuroBasket, in Stuttgart, and finished second at the 1991 FIBA EuroBasket, in Rome.

== Death ==
Rubini was involved with his beloved sports until his death: he promoted water polo formation for young athletes, and he was the Honorary President of Olimpia Milano. He died on 8 February 2011.

== See also ==
- Italy men's Olympic water polo team records and statistics
- List of Olympic champions in men's water polo
- List of Olympic medalists in water polo (men)
- List of members of the International Swimming Hall of Fame
- Legends of Italian sport - Walk of Fame
- List of EuroLeague-winning head coaches
