= Pedro Ferrándiz =

Spanish basketball coach (1928–2022)

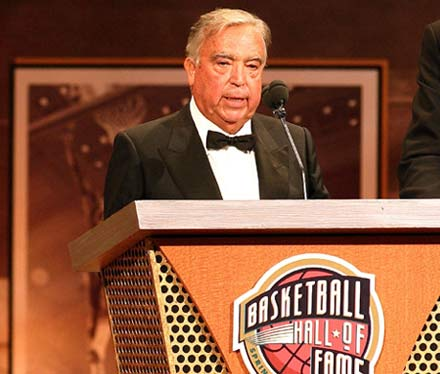
- Ferrándiz's acceptance speech, at the Naismith Memorial Basketball Hall of Fame, in 2007.

Personal information
- Born: 20 November 1928 Alicante, Spain
- Died: 7 July 2022 (aged 93) Alicante, Spain
- Position: Head coach
- Coaching career: 1955–1975

Career history

Coaching
- 1955–1957: Real Madrid Juniors
- 1957–1959: Hesperia
- 1959–1962: Real Madrid
- 1962–1967: Real Madrid (GM)
- 1964–1965: Spain
- 1964–1965, 1966–1975: Real Madrid

Career highlights
- As a head coach: 7× FIBA International Christmas Tournament champion (1967–1970, 1972–1974); 4× EuroLeague champion (1965, 1967, 1968, 1974); 12× Spanish League champion (1960–1962, 1965, 1968–1975); 11× Spanish Cup winner (1960–1962, 1965, 1967, 1970–1975); AEEB Spanish Coach of the Year (1975); Olympic Order (1977); FIBA Order of Merit (2000); 50 Greatest EuroLeague Contributors (2008); Spanish Royal Order of Sports Merit
- Basketball Hall of Fame
- FIBA Hall of Fame

Pedro Ferrándiz González (20 November 1928 – 7 July 2022) was a Spanish professional coach in the sport of basketball. He is most famous for having been the head coach of Real Madrid's basketball club, in the 1960s and 1970s. The International Olympic Committee awarded him with the Olympic Order in 1977. He was made an inductee of the Basketball Hall of Fame, in April 2007. In 2008, he was named one of the 50 Greatest EuroLeague Contributors. He was inducted into the FIBA Hall of Fame in 2009. He was also awarded with the Spanish Royal Order of Sports Merit.

== Club coaching career ==
Ferrándiz, who was born in Alicante, holds a record twelve national championship titles won as a head coach in Spain's top-tier level basketball league, the Spanish Primera División, as well as a record eleven Spanish King's Cup titles. Ferrándiz also won seven FIBA International Christmas Tournament championships, and four FIBA European Champions Cup (which is now called the EuroLeague) championships as a head coach. His combined record across all competitions, while coaching the Spanish basketball club Real Madrid, was 437–90. He also recorded three undefeated Spanish Primera División seasons. He was the AEEB Spanish Coach of the Year in 1975.

== National team coaching career ==
Ferrándiz was the head coach of the senior men's Spanish national team, from 1964 to 1965. He coached Spain at the 1965 FIBA EuroBasket.

== Death ==
Ferrándiz died in 2022, at the age of 93.

== Titles won ==
=== As a head coach ===
- 7× FIBA International Christmas Tournament Champion: (1967, 1968, 1969, 1970, 1972, 1973, 1974)
- 4× FIBA European Champions Cup (EuroLeague) Champion: 1964–65, 1966–67, 1967–68, 1973–74
- 12× Spanish League Champion: 1960, 1961, 1962, 1965, 1968, 1969, 1970, 1971, 1972, 1973, 1974, 1975
- 11× Spanish King's Cup Winner: 1960, 1961, 1962, 1965, 1967, 1970, 1971, 1972, 1973, 1974, 1975

== See also ==
- List of EuroLeague-winning head coaches
