= Evgeny Alekseev (basketball) =

Soviet basketball player

Personal information
- Born: 22 March 1919 Moscow, Russian SFSR
- Died: 28 February 2005 (aged 85) Moscow, Russia
- Listed height: 5 ft 11 in (1.80 m)

Career information
- Playing career: 1937–1953
- Coaching career: 1953–1984

Career history

Playing
- 1937–1940: Lokomotiv Moscow
- 1940, 1944–1949: CSKA Moscow
- 1949–1953: VVS Moscow

Coaching
- 1953–1966: CSKA Moscow
- 1967–1976: Dynamo Moscow
- 1976–1984: Spartak Moscow Women

Career highlights
- As player: 3× USSR League champion (1939, 1945, 1952); Honored Master of Sports of the USSR (1947); As head coach: 2× EuroLeague champion (1961, 1963); 6× USSR League champion (1960–1962, 1964–1966); Merited Coach of the USSR (1960); 3× Ronchetti Women's Cup champion (1977, 1981, 1982); USSR Women's League champion (1978)
Medals
Men's basketball
Representing Soviet Union
FIBA EuroBasket
Gold medal – first place	1947 Czechoslovakia

Evgeny Nikolaevich Alekseev (Russian: Евге́ний Никола́евич Алексе́ев; 22 March 1919 – February 28, 2005) was a Soviet and Russian professional basketball player and coach.

== Club career ==
Alekseev played club basketball with the Soviet clubs Lokomotiv Moscow, CSKA Moscow, where he was the team's captain, and VVS Moscow. He won three USSR League championships, in the years 1939, 1945, and 1952.

== National team career ==
Alekseev was the captain of the senior Soviet Union national basketball team. He played with the USSR at the EuroBasket 1947, where he won a gold medal, and averaged 10.2 points per game. He was subsequently named an Honored Master of Sports of the USSR.

== Coaching career ==
After his basketball playing career ended, Alekseev began working as a basketball coach, in 1953. As the head coach of CSKA Moscow, he won 6 USSR League championships, and two FIBA European Champions Cups (now called EuroLeague) titles, in 1961 and 1963, while also leading CSKA to the EuroLeague Finals in 1965. He was also the head coach of Dynamo Moscow.

As the head coach of Spartak Moscow Women, he won the USSR Women's League championship in 1978, and the Ronchetti Women's Cup three times (1977, 1981, and 1982).

He also worked as an assistant coach of the senior Soviet Union national basketball team. He was an assistant coach on the Soviet Union team that won a silver medal at the 1960 Summer Olympics. He was subsequently named a Merited Coach of the USSR. He was also an assistant coach with the Soviet Union, when they won the gold medal at the EuroBasket 1961.

== Awards and honors ==
- Honored Master of Sports of the USSR
- Merited Coach of the USSR
- Order of Friendship of Peoples
- Order of the Badge of Honour
- Order of the Patriotic War
- Order of the Red Star

== Personal life ==
Alekseev's wife, Lidiya Alekseyeva, was a well-known basketball player and also the long-time head basketball coach of the senior USSR women's national basketball team.

== See also ==
- List of EuroLeague-winning head coaches
