= Olimpia Milano =

Professional basketball team

- Nickname: Scarpette Rosse (Little Red Shoes)
- Leagues: LBA; EuroLeague
- Founded: 1930; 96 years ago
- History: Dopolavoro Borletti (1930–1947); Pallacanestro Olimpia Milano (1947–present)
- Arena: Unipol Forum
- Capacity: 12,700
- Location: Assago, Italy
- Team colors: White, red
- Main sponsor: EA7 Emporio Armani
- President: Pantaleo Dell'Orco
- General manager: Christos Stavropoulos
- Head coach: Luca Banchi
- Team captain: Giampaolo Ricci
- Ownership: Armani Foundation
- International titles: 3 EuroLeague; 3 Saporta Cups; 2 Korać Cups; 1 Intercontinental Cup
- Domestic titles: 32 Italian Championships; 9 Italian Cups; 7 Italian Supercups
- Retired numbers: 4 (8, 11, 18, 36)
- Website: olimpiamilano.com
Serie A Home	EuroLeague; Home
Serie A Away	EuroLeague; Away

Pallacanestro Olimpia Milano, commonly known as Olimpia Milano or as Armani Olimpia Milan after its title sponsor, is an LBA Italian professional basketball team, based in Milan, Italy. Its colors are white and red, and the team is sometimes referred as "Scarpette Rosse" (Little Red Shoes) because team officials imported red Converse All-Star shoes for players from the United States. The tag line stuck, and the nickname is still used by many fans today.

As per custom in the Italian league, sponsorship has kept the team name changing frequently. From 1930 until 1955, it was called Borletti Milano. From 1956 to 1973, it was renamed Simmenthal. Other famous sponsorship names were Billy, Simac, Tracer, and Philips, in the 1980s. For past club sponsorship names, see the list below.

Olimpia is the most successful basketball club in Italy and one of the most successful in Europe, having won 32 Italian League Championships, 9 Italian National Cups, 7 Italian Super Cups, 3 EuroLeague, 1 FIBA Intercontinental Cup, 3 FIBA Saporta Cups, 2 FIBA Korać Cups and many junior titles.

In 2016, the club was included in the Italian Basketball Hall of Fame.

== History ==
=== The birth and the Borletti era (1930–1955) ===
The birth of Pallacanestro Olimpia Milano is traditionally dated 1936, year of the first Italian League Championship title won by the team. Actually it was founded 6 years earlier (in 1930) as "Dopolavoro Borletti" by Fratelli Borletti managers. Borletti team won 4 consecutive Italian League Championships from 1936 to 1939.

In 1947, Milan businessman Adolfo Bogoncelli merged Pallacanestro Como and Borletti to form a new society, commonly known as "Borolimpia". "Borletti" brand was the main sponsor of the team, becoming the first sponsor in the history of Italian sport.

In 1955, after 9 Italian League Championships, Borletti brand leaves Olimpia Milano jersey.

=== The Simmenthal era (1956–1973) ===
The team regularly won the Italian League Championship in the 1950s and the 1960s, with players including Gabriele Vianello, Sandro Riminucci, Gianfranco Pieri, and Bill Bradley. In 1966, Olimpia won its first FIBA European Champions Cup.

In the 1970s, three teams were fighting across Europe for supremacy: Olimpia Milano, Ignis Varese, and Real Madrid. Pallacanestro Varese and Olimpia Milano were arch-rivals, as the two cities are 25 miles (40 km) apart. While Milano was a frequent Italian League champion, they were unable to win again the prestigious FIBA European Champions Cup. Late in the 1970s, the quality of the club declined, but Olimpia Milano still managed to win a FIBA Cup Winners' Cup.

In 1973, Simmenthal brand leaves Olimpia jersey after 17 years and 10 Italian League Championships.

=== 1974–2007 ===
In the 1970s through the 1980s, the team acquired several notable players, including the Boselli twins (Franco and Dino), Mike Sylvester, Chas Menatti, Dino Meneghin, Mike D'Antoni, John Gianelli, Roberto Premier. Bob McAdoo, Joe Barry Carroll, Russ Schoene, Antoine Carr, and Mike Brown. American head coach Dan Peterson led the team back to prominence.

In the 1980s, the team was sold to the Gabetti family. After this, they qualified for nine Serie A championships finals, winning five, with the 1987 team winning the Serie A title, the 1986–87 FIBA European Champions Cup (won also in 1988: both finals were won against Maccabi Tel Aviv), the Italian Cup and the 1987 FIBA Club World Cup. This gave the club the coveted "Triple Crown" and the even rarer "Quadruple Crown".

Led by point guard Sasha Djordjević, the team won another FIBA Korać Cup in 1993. Bepi Stefanel purchased the team franchise in 1994, and signed-up notable European players like Dejan Bodiroga, Gregor Fučka, Sandro De Pol, and Nando Gentile. In 1996, the team won the Italian Cup and its 25th Italian National Championship, celebrating the 60th anniversary of the club.

Team management was inconsistent, as ownership groups from 1998 to 2004. Players of the team included Warren Kidd, Hugo Sconochini, Claudio Coldebella and Petar Naumoski. In 2005, owner Corbelli, which bought the club in 2002, from Sergio Tacchini, was flanked by Adriano Galliani (managing director of Italian Football club A.C. Milan), Massimo Moratti (President of rival club Internazionale), NBA star Kobe Bryant, and stylist Giorgio Armani, as sponsor with the Armani Jeans brand. After difficult years, led by coach Lino Lardo, Olimpia reached the national championship Finals, finally being beaten by Climamio Bologna.

On January 25, 2006, in the midst of a disappointing season in the EuroLeague and domestically, Djordjevic was named as the team's new coach. He left as coach after the 2006–07 season, but not before securing Olimpia a berth in the 2007–08 Euroleague.

=== 2008–present ===
In 2008, Giorgio Armani bought the team from Giorgio Corbelli, standing as the only owner, entirely changing the management structure, naming Livio Proli as president, and Lucio Zanca as general manager. Piero Bucchi was chosen to coach the new team, leading Olimpia twice to second place in LEGA Basket, being defeated by Montepaschi Siena in both cases.

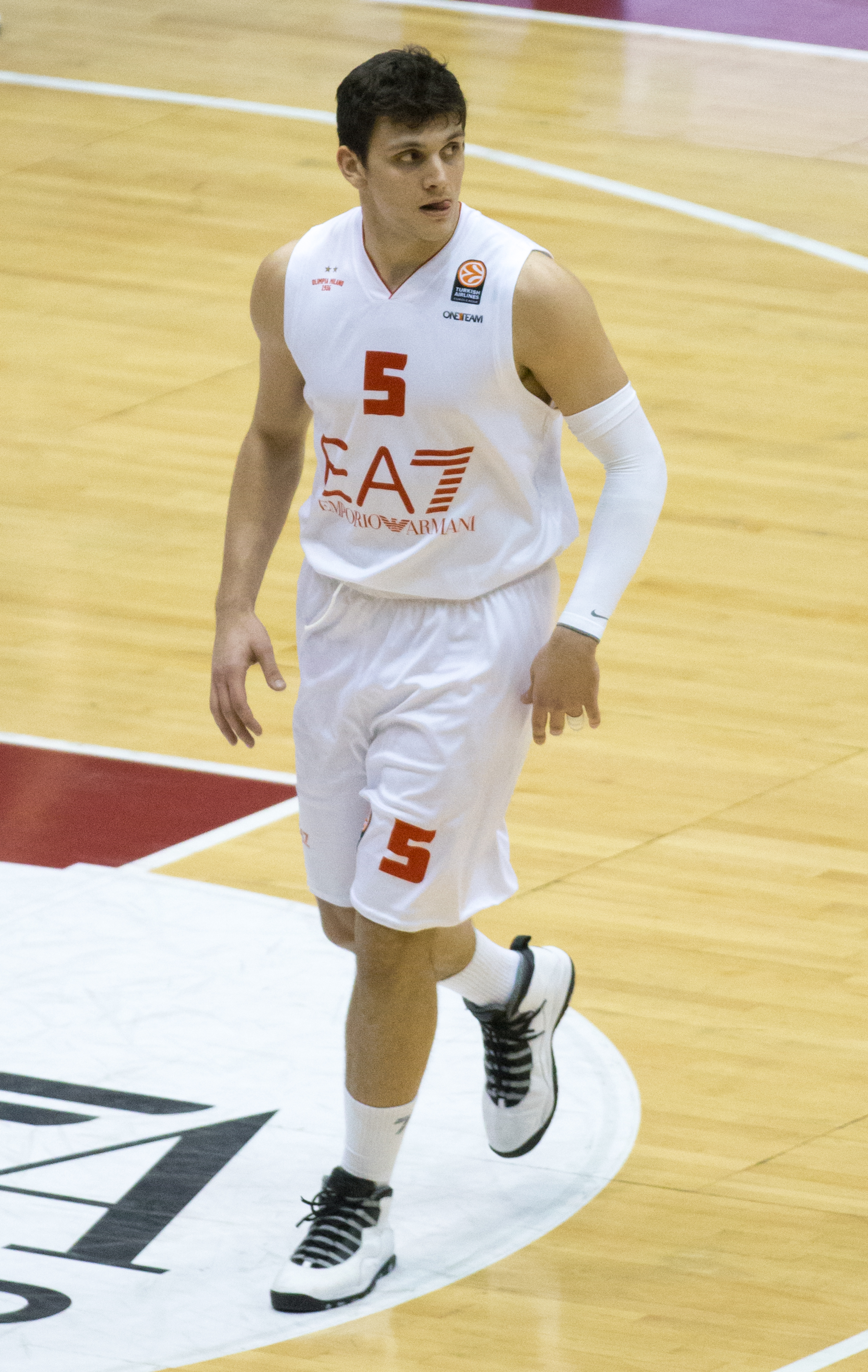
Alessandro Gentile

In January 2011, after 23 years away from coaching, Dan Peterson came back from retirement at the request of team owner Giorgio Armani to replace Piero Bucchi, who was fired in mid-season. Peterson was hired on an interim basis and agreed to coach only the remainder of the season, in which he guided the team to the semi-finals. On June 9, Olimpia Milano announced Sergio Scariolo as new head coach for the 2011–12 season. The first player signed for the 2011–12 season was Omar Cook, an American-born play maker, who had played the previous season with Power Electronics Valencia. Owing to the NBA lockout, Danilo Gallinari went back to his alma mater, playing 15 games (8 in the Italian League, 7 in EuroLeague): he left the team in December. Sergio Scariolo was replaced by Luca Banchi at the beginning of the 2013–14 season, and the team brought from Montepaschi Siena: David Moss, Kristjan Kangur, and Daniel Hackett.

The team reached the quarterfinals of EuroLeague, 16 years after its last appearance, but the team lost against the eventual league champions, Maccabi Tel Aviv. The team finished in the 1st position the LEGA Basket regular season, and in the 7th game of the playoff's finals, Olimpia won its 26th Italian League championship title, its first after 18 years. Alessandro Gentile, the captain of Olimpia, was named MVP of the finals.

On June 29, 2017, Simone Pianigiani was hired as the new head coach and on June 15, 2018, Milano went to win his 28th title by beating Dolomiti Energia Trento in game 6 of the 2018 LBA Finals.

On June 11, 2019, legend Ettore Messina signed a deal as the new head coach of the club and president of all basketball operations for the following three seasons.

On May 4, 2021, the club reached the Euroleague Final Four after 29 years (1992 Final Four).

== Logos ==
(The current non-sponsorship logo of the club).

(The Emporio Armani era sponsorship logo of the club).

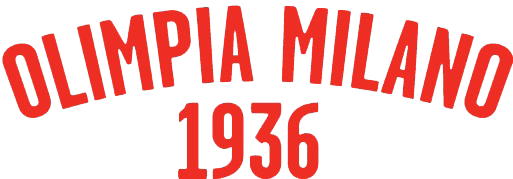
(A previous non-sponsorship logo of the club).

== Arenas ==
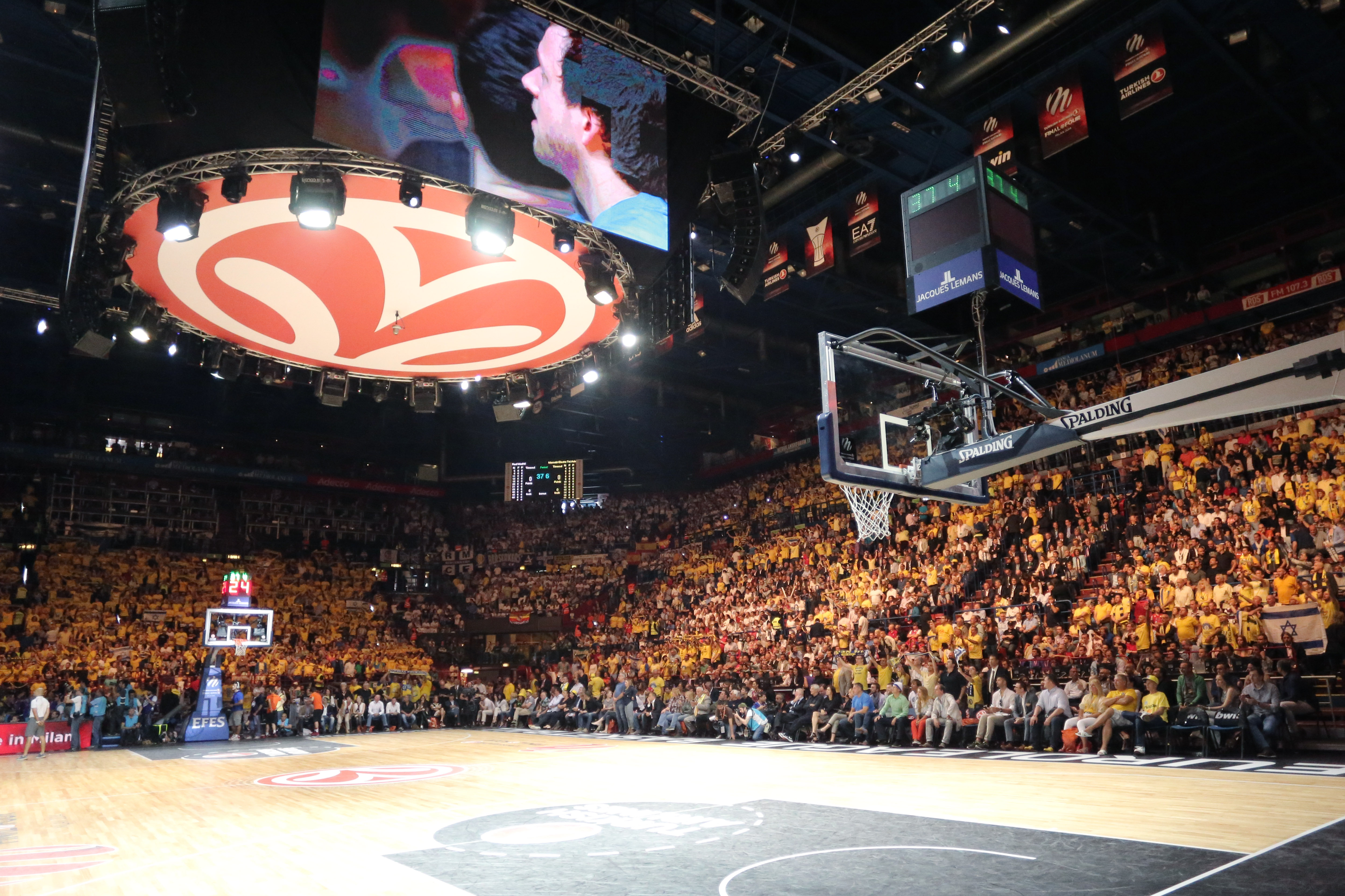
Mediolanum Forum during 2014 Euroleague Final Four final match

Arena	Photo	Capacity	Years	Notes
Court of Via Costanza		—N/a	1930–1948	Outdoor court of the OND Borletti factory
Palazzo dello Sport della Fiera		c. 18,000	1948-1960	The first sports palace of Milan and the biggest in Europe at that time
PalaLido		c. 10,000 (3,500)*	1960–1980 (1985)*	Indoor arena specifically designed for basketball *(temporarily used in 1985-86 season)
Palasport di San Siro		c. 15,000	1980–1985	On January 17, 1985, a large snowfall collapsed the roof and the arena was closed
PalaTrussardi		10,045	1986–1990	Also known as "PalaVobis", "Mazda Palace" and "PalaSharp"
Unipol Forum		12,700	1990–present	Originally named "the Forum of Assago", it was previously known as "FilaForum", "DatchForum" and "Mediolanum Forum".

=== Secondary Arenas ===
Arena	Photo	Capacity	Years	Notes
PalaLido		3,800	1990–2011	Used when Mediolanum Forum was unavailable
PalaDesio		6,700	2011–2019	In 2011, the old PalaLido was destroyed and rebuilt. PalaDesio was used as a secondary arena during the construction of the new arena
Allianz Cloud		5,347	2019–present	Built in place of the old PalaLido, it is used when Mediolanum Forum is unavailable

Olimpia Milano used the OND Borletti outdoor court of Via Costanza for almost 20 years. In the mid-1940s, they moved to the Palazzo dello Sport della Fiera, which had a seating capacity of 18,000 people, and was then the largest indoor sports arena in Europe, and second only to the Madison Square Garden in New York City. In 1960, the Palazzo dello Sport della Fiera was abandoned, and Olimpia moved into the original structure of the PalaLido, which then had a smaller seating capacity of 3,500, but because of lack of security measures at the time, often was filled with up to 10,000 people.

At the end of the 1970s, Olimpia moved into the newly built Palasport di San Siro, a multi-purpose facility built next to the Meazza Stadium, that was able to hold about 15,000 spectators. In 1985, the roof of the Palasport di San Siro collapsed and Olimpia returned to PalaLido for a season, waiting for the construction of a provisional arena. In 1986, they moved into the recently built 10,045 seat PalaTrussardi, where they played through the early 1990s.

The club then moved into its current home arena, the Mediolanum Forum, which has a seating capacity of 12,700. The club has also played some home games at the 6,700 seat PalaDesio. Recently, the club considered moving back to the newly rebuilt and modernized PalaLido (named Allianz Cloud), after it was remodeled, and had its seating capacity expanded. However, the club ultimately decided to continue using the Mediolanum Forum as its home arena, due to its much larger seating capacity, as compared to the new Allianz Cloud. However, the new arena is used when Mediolanum Forum is unavailable.

== Honours and other achievements ==
Honours
Type	Competition	Titles	Seasons
International	EuroLeague	3	1965–66, 1986–87, 1987–88
International	FIBA Club World Cup	1	1987
International	FIBA Saporta Cup	3	1970–71, 1971–72, 1975–76
International	FIBA Korać Cup	2	1984–85, 1992–93
Domestic	Italian League	32	1935–36, 1936–37, 1937–38, 1938–39, 1949–50, 1950–51, 1951–52, 1952–53, 1953–54, 1956–57, 1957–58, 1958–59, 1959–60, 1961–62, 1962–63, 1964–65, 1965–66, 1966–67, 1971–72, 1981–82, 1984–85, 1985–86, 1986–87, 1988–89, 1995–96, 2013–14, 2015–16, 2017–18, 2021–22, 2022–23, 2023–24, 2025–26
Domestic	Italian Cup	9	1971–72, 1985–86, 1986–87, 1995–96, 2015–16, 2016–17, 2020–21, 2021–22, 2025–26
Domestic	Italian Supercup	7	2016, 2017, 2018, 2020, 2024, 2025, 2026

- Record title holders

=== Other achievements ===
==== Trebles ====
- Triple Crown
  - Season (1): 1986–87
- Small Triple Crown
  - Season (1): 1971–72

==== International competitions ====
- EuroLeague
  - Runners-up (2): 1966–67, 1982–83
  - Semifinalists (3): 1963–64, 1967–68, 1972–73, 1985–86
  - 3rd place (2): 1991–92, 2020–21
  - Final Four (5): 1966, 1967, 1988, 1992, 2021
- FIBA Saporta Cup (defunct)
  - Runners-up (2): 1983–84, 1997–98
  - Semifinalists (1): 1976–77
- FIBA Korać Cup (defunct)
  - Runners-up (2): 1994–95, 1995–96
  - Semifinalists (3): 1977–78, 1988–89, 1993–94
- European Basketball Club Super Cup (semi-official, defunct)
  - 3rd place (2): 1985, 1989
  - 4th place (2): 1986, 1987
- Latin Cup (defunct)

Winners (1): 1966

  - Runners-up (1): 1953
- European Tournament (San Remo) (defunct)

Winners (2): 1952, 1954

- FIBA Intercontinental Cup
  - 3rd place (2): 1967, 1968
- McDonald's Championship (defunct)

3rd place (2): 1987, 1989

==== Domestic competitions ====
- Italian League
  - Runners-up (18): 1934, 1940–41, 1955–56, 1963–64, 1968–69, 1969–70, 1970–71, 1972–73, 1973–74, 1978–79, 1982–83, 1983–84, 1987–88, 1990–91, 2004–05, 2008–09, 2009–10, 2011–12, 2020–21
- Italian Cup
  - Runners-up (3): 1969–70, 2014–15, 2023–24
- Italian Supercup
  - Runners-up (4): 1996, 2014, 2015, 2021

==== Other Competitions ====
- Castellanza, Italy Invitational Game

Winners (1): 2007

- Memoriale di Tulio Rochlitzer

Winners (1): 2007

- Torneo Caorle

Winners (2): 2007, 2011

- Reggio Emilia, Italy Invitational Game

Winners (1): 2008

- Torneo Lombardia

Winners (2): 2009, 2016

- Torneo Castelleto Ticino

Winners (3): 2009, 2018, 2019

- Verona, Italy Invitational Game

Winners (1): 2011

- Trofeo de Ejea de los Caballeros

Winners (1): 2011

- Belgrade, Serbia Invitational Game

Winners (1): 2014

- Torneo del Circuito della Valtellina

Winners (1): 2014

- Trofeo Memorial Gianni Brusinelli

Winners (1): 2016

- Torneo Lovari

Winners (1): 2017

- Torneo Lucca

Winners (1): 2019

- Milan, Italy Invitational Game

Winners (1): 2019

== Players ==
=== Current roster ===
Note: Flags indicate national team eligibility at FIBA-sanctioned events. Players may hold other non-FIBA nationalities not displayed.

Olimpia Milano roster
Players
Coaches

Pos.	No.	Nat.	Name	Ht.	Wt.	Age
PF	0	(United States)	Burnell, Jason	2.01 m (6 ft 7 in)	100 kg (220 lb)	29 – 15 August 1997
PG	2	(United States)	Cole, R. J.	1.85 m (6 ft 1 in)	84 kg (185 lb)	27 – 24 August 1999
C	5	(North Macedonia)	Wright, Moses	2.06 m (6 ft 9 in)	104 kg (229 lb)	27 – 23 December 1998
C	6	(Senegal)	Diop, Ousmane	2.04 m (6 ft 8 in)	100 kg (220 lb)	26 – 19 February 2000
SG	7	(Italy)	Tonut, Stefano	1.94 m (6 ft 4 in)	100 kg (220 lb)	33 – 7 November 1993
G/F	10	(Argentina)	Bolmaro, Leandro	2.01 m (6 ft 7 in)	95 kg (209 lb)	26 – 11 September 2000
G	13	(Italy)	Thompson, Darius	1.93 m (6 ft 4 in)	89 kg (196 lb)	31 – 4 May 1995
PG	15	(France)	Chauveau, Baptiste (Y)	1.88 m (6 ft 2 in)	84 kg (185 lb)	18 – 25 February 2008
F	17	(Italy)	Ricci, Giampaolo (C)	2.02 m (6 ft 8 in)	100 kg (220 lb)	35 – 27 September 1991
G	21	(Italy)	Flaccadori, Diego	1.95 m (6 ft 5 in)	80 kg (176 lb)	30 – 5 April 1996
G/F	22	(United States)	Hall, Devon	1.97 m (6 ft 6 in)	86 kg (190 lb)	31 – 7 July 1995
SG	23	(Serbia)	Gudurić, Marko	1.98 m (6 ft 6 in)	91 kg (201 lb)	31 – 8 March 1995
G/F	24	(United States)	Mathews, Garrison	1.96 m (6 ft 5 in)	98 kg (216 lb)	30 – 24 October 1996
F	25	(United States) (Bosnia and Herzegovina)	Peters, Alec	2.05 m (6 ft 9 in)	107 kg (236 lb)	31 – 13 April 1995
F/C	31	(United States)	Booker, Devin (injured)	2.06 m (6 ft 9 in)	113 kg (249 lb)	35 – 28 February 1991
PF	45	(Italy)	Akele, Nicola	2.03 m (6 ft 8 in)	96 kg (212 lb)	31 – 7 November 1995

Head coach

- (Italy) Luca Banchi

Legend

- (C) Team captain
- (IN) Inactive
- (Y) Youth player
- Injured

- Roster
Updated: September 25, 2026

=== Depth chart ===
Pos.	Starting 5	Bench 1	Bench 2	Bench 3	Inactive
C	Moses Wright °	Ousmane Diop †			Devin Booker * (injured)
PF	Alec Peters °	Jason Burnell *		Nicola Akele †
SF	Marko Gudurić °	Garrison Mathews *	Giampaolo Ricci †
SG	Leandro Bolmaro †	Devon Hall *	Stefano Tonut †	Diego Flaccadori †
PG	Darius Thompson †	R. J. Cole *		Baptiste Chauveau ‡

Notes: LBA clubs can choose between two main roster composition and foreign player formulas:

- 5+5 Formula: 5 Italian players and 5 foreign players.
- 3+4+5 Formula: 5 Italian players, 3 non-EU (European Union) foreigners, and 4 EU foreigners (including countries from the Cotonou Agreement).

Blue † – Homegrown player; (Note: A homegrown player (known in Italy as an atleta di formazione italiana) is defined by where they received their basketball training, rather than their actual passport or nationality. To be officially classified as a homegrown player by the Italian Basketball Federation (FIP), an athlete must complete at least four seasons in an Italian club’s youth academy (between the ages of 14 and 21), appearing in a minimum of 14 games per season. In EuroLeague, the team did not have any limitations regarding the number of Homegrown players.) Red * – Non-EU foreign player; (Note: A non-EU foreigner is a player from a country with no special trade or labor agreement with the European Union. In professional basketball, this primarily applies to players from the United States, Canada, Australia, and parts of Asia or non-EU Europe who do not possess a secondary European passport.) Purple °; – EU Foreign player (Note: "EU Foreign" players: An EU foreign player is a player who holds citizenship in a European Union (EU) member state (or an associated territory) but is not a citizen of the country where the league is based. Minimum of 4 EU Foreign players must be included on the active roster using the 3+4+5 formula) Gold ^; – Cotonou Agreement player (Note: "Cotonou Agreement" players: A Cotonou Agreement player (often called a "Cotonou player") is a basketball player who holds a passport from one of the 79 African, Caribbean, or Pacific (ACP) nations that signed the Cotonou Agreement with the European Union. In the LBA, these athletes are treated exactly like EU citizens and do not count against strict non-EU import quotas. The Cotonou Agreement is a political and trade treaty originally signed in 2000. Following a legal precedent known as the Kolpak ruling, European courts determined that citizens of countries with trade agreements guaranteeing non-discrimination against workers must have the same right to free movement of labor as EU citizens. Because of this ruling, if an LBA club chooses the 3+4+5 team-building formula, Cotonou players can be signed to fill the 4 EU foreigner roster spots, leaving the team’s 3 non-EU spots completely open for American or other traditional import players.) Green ‡ – youth player (Note: "Youth" players: players who are under the age of 20. In the context of European basketball and the LBA, youth players act as a bridge for clubs to fill out their active game-day rosters while meeting domestic requirements. To satisfy the "Italian player" requirement in the 5+5 or 3+4+5 formulas, a player does not technically have to be born in Italy. They can qualify as "homegrown" (Italian-trained) if they spent at least three consecutive seasons in an Italian club's youth academy between the ages of 15 and 21.)

=== Players out on loan ===
Players out on loan
Nat.	Player	Position	Team	On loan since	Source
(United States)	Dante Maddox Jr.	PG	(Italy) Derthona	20 July 2026	
(Spain)	Lorenzo Brown	PG	(Israel) Hapoel Jerusalem	25 September 2026	

=== Retired numbers ===
Olimpia Milano retired numbers
No	Nat.	Player	Position	Tenure	Date retired	Ref.
8	(United States) (Italy)	Mike D'Antoni	PG	1977–1990	2015	
11	(Italy)	Dino Meneghin	C	1980–1990; 1993-1994	2019	
18	(United States)	Art Kenney	PF/C	1970–1973	2013	
36	(United States)	Dan Peterson	Coach	1979-1987; 2011	2023	

== Season by season ==
Season	Tier	League	Pos.	Playoffs	Cup	European competitions		Coach	Main Sponsor
1935-36	1	Serie A	1st					Giannino Valli	Borletti
1936-37	1	Serie A	1st					Giannino Valli	Borletti
1937-38	1	Serie A	1st					Giannino Valli	Borletti
1938-39	1	Serie A	1st					Giannino Valli	Borletti
1939-40	1	Serie A	7th					Giannino Valli	Borletti
1940-41	1	Serie A	2nd					Giannino Valli	Borletti
1941-42	1	Serie A	5th					Giannino Valli	Borletti
1942-43	1	Serie A	5th					Giannino Valli	Borletti
1945-46	1	Serie A	2nd round						Borletti
1946-47	1	Serie A	1st round					Umberto Fedeli	Borletti
1947-48	1	Serie A	2nd					Umberto Fedeli	Borletti
1948-49	1	Serie A	3rd					Cesare Rubini	Borletti
1949-50	1	Serie A	1st					Cesare Rubini	Borletti
1950-51	1	Serie A	1st					Cesare Rubini	Borletti
1951-52	1	Serie A	1st					Cesare Rubini	Borletti
1952-53	1	Serie A	1st					Cesare Rubini	Borletti
1953-54	1	Elette	1st					Cesare Rubini	Borletti
1954-55	1	Elette	3rd					Cesare Rubini	Borletti
1955-56	1	Elette	2nd					Cesare Rubini	Simmenthal
1956-57	1	Elette	1st					Cesare Rubini	Simmenthal
1957-58	1	Elette	1st			1 European Champions Cup	Quarterfinalist	Cesare Rubini	Simmenthal
1958-59	1	Elette	1st					Cesare Rubini	Simmenthal
1959-60	1	Elette	1st					Cesare Rubini	Simmenthal
1960-61	1	Elette	3rd					Cesare Rubini	Simmenthal
1961-62	1	Elette	1st					Cesare Rubini	Simmenthal
1962-63	1	Elette	1st			1 European Champions Cup	Quarterfinalist	Cesare Rubini	Simmenthal
1963-64	1	Elette	2nd			1 European Champions Cup	Semifinalist	Cesare Rubini	Simmenthal
1964-65	1	Elette	1st					Cesare Rubini	Simmenthal
1965-66	1	Serie A	1st			1 European Champions Cup	Champion	Cesare Rubini	Simmenthal
1966-67	1	Serie A	1st			1 European Champions Cup	Runner-up	Cesare Rubini	Simmenthal
1967-68	1	Serie A	4th			1 European Champions Cup	Semifinalist	Cesare Rubini	Simmenthal
1968-69	1	Serie A	2nd		Eight-finalist			Cesare Rubini	Simmenthal
1969-70	1	Serie A	2nd		Runner-up			Cesare Rubini	Simmenthal
1970-71	1	Serie A	1st	Runner-up	3rd	2 European Cup Winners' Cup	Champion	Cesare Rubini	Simmenthal
1971-72	1	Serie A	1st		Champion	2 European Cup Winners' Cup	Champion	Cesare Rubini	Simmenthal
1972-73	1	Serie A	1st	Runner-up	Quarterfinalist	1 European Champions Cup	Semifinalist	Cesare Rubini	Simmenthal
1973-74	1	Serie A	2nd		Quarterfinalist	3 Korać Cup	R12	Cesare Rubini	Innocenti
1974-75	1	Serie A1	3rd	3rd (second phase)		3 Korać Cup	R16	Filippo Faina	Innocenti
1975-76	1	Serie A1	11th	Relegated to Serie A2		2 European Cup Winners' Cup	Champion	Filippo Faina	Cinzano
1976-77	2	Serie A2	1st	4th (second phase)		2 European Cup Winners' Cup	Semifinalist	Filippo Faina	Cinzano
1977-78	1	Serie A1	6th	4th (second phase)		3 Korać Cup	Semifinalist	Filippo Faina	Cinzano
1978-79	1	Serie A1	5th	Runner-up				Dan Peterson	Billy
1979-80	1	Serie A1	1st	Semifinalist				Dan Peterson	Billy
1980-81	1	Serie A1	2nd	Semifinalist				Dan Peterson	Billy
1981-82	1	Serie A1	3rd	Champion				Dan Peterson	Billy
1982-83	1	Serie A1	2nd	Runner-up		1 European Champions Cup	Runner-up	Dan Peterson	Billy
1983-84	1	Serie A1	1st	Runner-up	Semifinalist	2 Saporta Cup	Runner-up	Dan Peterson	Simac
1984-85	1	Serie A1	2nd	Champion	Quarterfinalist	3 Korać Cup	Champion	Dan Peterson	Simac
1985-86	1	Serie A1	1st	Champion	Champion	1 European Champions Cup	Semifinalist	Dan Peterson	Simac
1986-87	1	Serie A1	4th	Champion	Champion	1 European Champions Cup	Champion	Dan Peterson	Tracer
1987-88	1	Serie A1	2nd	Runner-up	Eighth-finalist	1 European Champions Cup	Champion	Franco Casalini	Tracer
1988-89	1	Serie A1	5th	Champion	Semifinalist	3 Korać Cup	Semifinalist	Franco Casalini	Philips
1989-90	1	Serie A1	10th	Eighth-finalist	RS	1 European Champions Cup	Quarterfinalist	Franco Casalini	Philips
1990-91	1	Serie A1	1st	Runner-up	Runner-up			Mike D'Antoni	Philips
1991-92	1	Serie A1	3rd	Quarterfinalist	Quarterfinalist	1 European League	3rd	Mike D'Antoni	Philips
1992-93	1	Serie A1	2nd	Quarterfinalist	Quarterfinalist	3 Korać Cup	Champion	Mike D'Antoni	Philips
1993-94	1	Serie A1	5th	Quarterfinalist	Eighth-finalist	3 Korać Cup	Semifinalist	Mike D'Antoni	Recoaro
1994-95	1	Serie A1	4th	Semifinalist	Semifinalist	3 Korać Cup	Runner-up	Bogdan Tanjević	Stefanel
1995-96	1	Serie A1	5th	Champion	Champion	3 Korać Cup	Runner-up	Bogdan Tanjević	Stefanel
1996-97	1	Serie A1	4th	Semifinalist	3rd	1 EuroLeague	Quarterfinalist	Franco Marcelletti	Stefanel
1997-98	1	Serie A1	6th	Eighth-finalist	Semifinalist	2 EuroCup	Runner-up	Franco Marcelletti	Stefanel
1998-99	1	Serie A1	5th	Quarterfinalist	Eighth-finalist	2 Saporta Cup	R32	Marco Crespi	Sony
1999-00	1	Serie A1	13th	Quarterfinalist		2 Saporta Cup	R16	Marco Crespi	Adecco
2000-01	1	Serie A1	15th					Valerio Bianchini	Adecco
2001–02	1	Serie A	17th					Guido Saibene	Adecco
2002–03	1	Serie A	5th	Round of 16	Quarterfinalist			Attilio Caja	Pippo
2003–04	1	Serie A	10th			2 ULEB Cup	T16	Attilio Caja	Breil
2004–05	1	Serie A	4th	Runner-up	Quarterfinalist			Lino Lardo	Armani Jeans
2005–06	1	Serie A	7th	Quarterfinalist	Quarterfinalist	1 Euroleague	RS	Lino Lardo	Armani Jeans
2006–07	1	Serie A	2nd	Semifinalist	Semifinalist			Aleksandar Đorđević	Armani Jeans
2007–08	1	Serie A	5th	Semifinalist		1 Euroleague	RS	Zare Markovski	Armani Jeans
2008–09	1	Serie A	6th	Runner-up		1 Euroleague	T16	Piero Bucchi	Armani Jeans
2009–10	1	Serie A	3rd	Runner-up	Quarterfinalist	1 Euroleague	RS	Piero Bucchi	Armani Jeans
2010–11	1	Serie A	3rd	Semifinalist	Quarterfinalist	1 Euroleague	RS	Piero Bucchi / Dan Peterson	Armani Jeans
2011–12	1	Serie A	2nd	Runner-up	Semifinalist	1 Euroleague	T16	Sergio Scariolo	EA7 Emporio Armani
2012–13	1	Serie A	4th	Quarterfinalist	Quarterfinalist	1 Euroleague	RS	Sergio Scariolo	EA7 Emporio Armani
2013–14	1	Serie A	1st	Champion	Quarterfinalist	1 Euroleague	QF	Luca Banchi	EA7 Emporio Armani
2014–15	1	Serie A	1st	Semifinalist	Runner-up	1 Euroleague	T16	Luca Banchi	EA7 Emporio Armani
2015–16	1	Serie A	1st	Champion	Champion	1 Euroleague	RS	Jasmin Repeša	EA7 Emporio Armani
2016–17	1	Serie A	1st	Semifinalist	Champion	1 EuroLeague	16th	Jasmin Repeša	EA7 Emporio Armani
2017–18	1	Serie A	2nd	Champion	Quarterfinalist	1 EuroLeague	15th	Simone Pianigiani	EA7 Emporio Armani
2018–19	1	Serie A	1st	Semifinalist	Quarterfinalist	1 EuroLeague	12th	Simone Pianigiani	AX Armani Exchange
2019–20	1	Serie A	4th (Note: Season cancelled due to COVID-19 pandemic.)		Semifinalist	1 EuroLeague	—	Ettore Messina	AX Armani Exchange
2020–21	1	Serie A	1st	Runner-up	Champion	1 EuroLeague	3rd	Ettore Messina	AX Armani Exchange
2021–22	1	Serie A	2nd	Champion	Champion	1 EuroLeague	QF	Ettore Messina	AX Armani Exchange
2022–23	1	Serie A	1st	Champion	Quarterfinalist	1 EuroLeague	12th	Ettore Messina	EA7 Emporio Armani
2023–24	1	Serie A	2nd	Champion	Runner-up	1 EuroLeague	12th	Ettore Messina	EA7 Emporio Armani
2024–25	1	Serie A	5th	Semifinalist	Runner-up	1 EuroLeague	11th	Ettore Messina	EA7 Emporio Armani
2025–26	1	Serie A	3rd	Champion	Champion	1 EuroLeague	14th	Ettore Messina / Giuseppe Poeta	EA7 Emporio Armani

== Top performances in European & Worldwide competitions ==
Season	Achievement	Notes
EuroLeague
1957–58	Quarter-finals	eliminated by Honvéd, 80–72 (W) in Milan and 85–95 (L) in Budapest
1962–63	Quarter-finals	eliminated by Dinamo Tbilisi, 70–65 (W) in Tbilisi and 68–74 (L) in Milan
1963–64	Semi-finals	eliminated by Real Madrid, 82–77 (W) in Milan and 78–101 (L) in Madrid
1965–66	Champions	defeated CSKA Moscow 68–57 in the semi-final, defeated Slavia VŠ Praha 77–72 in the final of the Final Four in Bologna / Milan
1966–67	Final	defeated Slavia VŠ Praha 103–97 in the semi-final, lost to Real Madrid 83–91 in the final (Madrid)
1967–68	Semi-finals	eliminated by Spartak ZJŠ Brno, 64–63 (W) in Milan, 86–103 (L) in Brno
1972–73	Semi-finals	eliminated by Ignis Varese, 72–97 (L) in Milan, 100–115 (L) in Varese
1982–83	Final	lost to Ford Cantù, 68–69 in the final (Grenoble)
1985–86	Semi-final group stage	3rd place in a group with Cibona, Žalgiris, Real Madrid, Maccabi Tel Aviv and Limoges CSP
1986–87	Champions	defeated Maccabi Tel Aviv, 71–69 in the final of European Champions Cup in Lausanne
1987–88	Champions	defeated Aris 87–82 in the semi-final, defeated Maccabi Tel Aviv 90–84 in the final of the Final Four in Ghent
1989–90	Quarter-finals	5th place in a group with FC Barcelona, Jugoplastika, Limoges CSP, Aris, Maccabi Tel Aviv, Commodore Den Helder and Lech Poznań
1991–92	Final Four	3rd place in Istanbul, lost to Partizan 75–82 in the semi-final, defeated Estudiantes Caja Postal 99–81 in the 3rd place game
1996–97	Quarter-finals	eliminated 2–1 by Smelt Olimpija, 94–90 (W) in Milan, 69–73 (L) in Ljubljana, 61–77 (L) in Milan
2013–14	Quarter-finals	eliminated 3–1 by Maccabi Tel Aviv, 99–101 (L) and 91–77 (W) in Milan, 63–75 (L) and 66–86 (L) in Tel Aviv
2020–21	Final Four	3rd place in Cologne, lost to FC Barcelona 82–84 in the semi-final, defeated CSKA Moscow 83–73 in the 3rd place game
2021–22	Quarter-finals	eliminated 3–1 by Anadolu Efes, 48–64 (L) and 73–66 (W) in Milan, 65–77 (L) and 70–75 (L) in Istanbul
FIBA Saporta Cup
1970–71	Champions	defeated Spartak Leningrad 56–66 (L) in Leningrad and 71–52 (W) in Milan in the double final of FIBA European Cup Winners' Cup
1971–72	Champions	defeated Crvena zvezda 74–70 in the final of FIBA European Cup Winners' Cup in Thessaloniki
1975–76	Champions	defeated ASPO Tours 88–83 in the final of FIBA European Cup Winners' Cup in Turin
1976–77	Semi-finals	eliminated by Forst Cantù, 78–101 (L) in Cantù and 98–95 (W) in Milan
1983–84	Final	lost to Real Madrid 81–82 in the final (Ostend)
1997–98	Final	lost to Žalgiris 67–82 in the final (Belgrade)
FIBA Korać Cup
1977–78	Semi-finals	eliminated by Bosna, 79–76 (W) in Milan and 81–101 (L) in Sarajevo
1984–85	Champions	defeated Ciaocrem Varese, 91–78 in the final of FIBA Korać Cup in Brussels
1988–89	Semi-finals	eliminated by Wiwa Vismara Cantù, 81–95 (L) in Cantù and 70–65 (W) in Milan
1992–93	Champions	defeated Virtus Roma, 95–90 (W) in Rome and 106–91 (W) in Milan in the double finals of FIBA Korać Cup
1993–94	Semi-finals	eliminated by Stefanel Trieste, 79–96 (L) in Trieste and 103–96 (W) in Milan
1994–95	Final	lost to Alba Berlin, 87–87 (D) in Milan and 79–85 (L) in Berlin
1995–96	Final	lost to Efes Pilsen, 68–76 (L) in Istanbul and 77–70 (W) in Milan
EuroCup Basketball
2015–16	Quarter-finals	eliminated by Dolomiti Energia Trento, 73–83 (L) in Trento and 79–92 (L) in Milan
FIBA Intercontinental Cup
1967	3rd place	3rd place in Rome, lost to Ignis Varese 70–79 in the semi-final, defeated Corinthians 90–89 in the 3rd place game
1968	3rd place	3rd place in Philadelphia, lost to Real Madrid 84–93 in the semi-final, defeated Botafogo 82–54 in the 3rd place game
1983	5th place	5th place with a 2–3 record in a league tournament in Buenos Aires
1987	Champions	defeated FC Barcelona 100–84 in the final of FIBA Club World Cup in Milan
McDonald's Championship
1987	3rd place	3rd place in a three teams Tournament in Milwaukee with Milwaukee Bucks and Soviet Union
1989	3rd place	3rd place in Rome, lost to Jugoplastika 97–102 in the semi-final, defeated FC Barcelona 136–104 in the 3rd place game

== Matches against NBA teams ==
23 October 1987

(United States) Milwaukee Bucks	123–111	(Italy) Tracer Milano

(United States) MECCA Arena, Milwaukee, 1987 McDonald's Championship

3 October 2010

Boxscore

(United States) New York Knicks	125–113	(Italy) Armani Jeans Milano

(Italy) Mediolanum Forum, Milan, NBA Global Games

7 October 2012

(United States) Boston Celtics	105–75	(Italy) EA7 Emporio Armani Milano

(Italy) Mediolanum Forum, Milan, NBA Global Games

6 October 2015

Boxscore

(United States) Boston Celtics	124–91	(Italy) EA7 Emporio Armani Milano

(Italy) Mediolanum Forum, Milan, NBA Global Games

== Sponsorship names ==
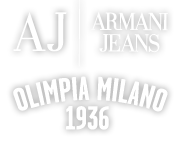
Logo of Armani Jeans Milano (2004–2011)

Through the years, due to sponsorship deals, it has been also known as:

- Borletti (1930–1955)
- Simmenthal (1955–1973)
- Innocenti (1973–1975)
- Cinzano (1975–1978)
- Billy (1978–1983)
- Simac (1983–1986)
- Tracer (1986–1988)
- Philips (1988–1993)
- Recoaro (1993–94)
- Stefanel (1994–1998)
- Sony (1998–99)
- Adecco (1999–2002)
- Pippo (2002–03)
- Breil (2003–04)
- Armani Jeans (2004–2011)
- EA7 Emporio Armani (2011–2018)
- AX Armani Exchange (2018–2022)
- EA7 Emporio Armani (2022–2026)
- Armani (2026–present)

== Notable players ==
Note: Flags indicate national team eligibility at FIBA-sanctioned events. Players may hold other non-FIBA nationalities not displayed.

Criteria

To appear in this section a player must have either:

- Set a club record or won an individual award while at the club
- Played at least one official international match for their national team at any time
- Played at least one official NBA match at any time.

- (Italy) #9 Cesare Rubini (1948–1957)
- (Italy) #7 Sergio Stefanini (1949–1955)
- (Italy) #5 Enrico Pagani (1949–1960)
- (Italy) #3 Romeo Romanutti (1950–1958)
- (Italy) #8 Sandro Gamba (1950–1963)
- (Italy) #7 Gianfranco Pieri (1955–1968)
- (Italy) #10 Sandro Riminucci (1956–1970)
- (Italy) #9 Paolo Vittori (1959–1965)
- (Italy) #6 Gabriele Vianello (1962–1967)
- (Italy) #8 Massimo Masini (1963–1974)
- (Italy) #5 Giulio Iellini (1964–1975)
- (Italy) #18, #9 Vittorio Ferracini (1967–1969, 1973–1983)
- (Italy) #6 Giuseppe Brumatti (1967–1977)
- (Italy) #13 Renzo Bariviera (1969–1975)
- (Italy) #12 Vittorio Gallinari (1976–1987)
- (Italy) #11 Dino Meneghin (1980–1990, 1993–1994)
- (Italy) #10 Roberto Premier (1981–1989)
- (Italy) #7 Riccardo Pittis (1984–1993)
- (Italy) #12 Antonello Riva (1989–1994)
- (Italy) #5 Ferdinando Gentile (1994–1998)
- (Italy) #9 Marco Mordente (1996–2000, 2008–2011)
- (Italy) #11, #9 Massimo Bulleri (2005–2008, 2008–2009, 2009–2010)
- (Italy) #8 Danilo Gallinari (2006–2008; 2011)
- (Italy) #6 Stefano Mancinelli (2009–2012)
- (Italy) #9, #18 Nicolò Melli (2010–2015, 2021–2024)
- (Italy) #25, #5 Alessandro Gentile (2011–2016)
- (Italy) #13 Simone Fontecchio (2016–2019)
- (Italy) #00 Amedeo Della Valle (2018–2020)
- (Italy) #70 Luigi Datome (2020–2023)
- (Italy) #17 Giampaolo Ricci (2021–present)
- (Italy) #45 Nicola Akele (2026–present)
- (United States) #9 Skip Thoren (1965–1966)
- (United States) #15 Bill Bradley (1965–1966)
- (United States) #18 Art Kenney (1970–1973)
- (United States) #15 Mike Sylvester (1975–1980)
- (United States) (Italy) #8 Mike D'Antoni (1977–1990)
- (United States) #15 Joe Barry Carroll (1984–1985)
- (United States) #14 Russ Schoene (1984–1986)
- (United States) #13 Ken Barlow (1986–1987)
- (United States) #15 Bob McAdoo (1986–1990)
- (United States) #13 Ricky Brown (1987–1988)
- (United States) #15 Darryl Dawkins (1991–1992)
- (United States) #10 Antonio Davis (1992–1993)
- (Federal Republic of Yugoslavia) #4, #19 Aleksandar Đorđević (1992–1994, 2005)
- (Argentina) #47, #10 Hugo Sconochini (1993–1995, 2002–2004)
- (Federal Republic of Yugoslavia) #10 Dejan Bodiroga (1994–1996)
- (Slovenia) (Italy) #7 Gregor Fučka (1994–1997)
- (United States) #15 Rolando Blackman (1995–1996)
- (Greece) #9 Giorgos Sigalas (1997–1998)
- (United States) #12 Melvin Booker (1998–1999, 2007–2008)
- (Lithuania) #15 Mindaugas Katelynas (2007–2009)
- (United States) #14, #34 David Hawkins (2008–2009, 2010–2011)
- (United States) (Italy) #12 Richard Mason Rocca (2008–2012)
- (Lithuania) #8 Jonas Mačiulis (2009–2011)
- (Lithuania) #15 Marijonas Petravičius (2009–2011)
- (Greece) #15 Ioannis Bourousis (2011–2013)
- (United States) #7 Malik Hairston (2011–2013)
- (United States) #23 Keith Langford (2012–2014)
- (United States) #55 Curtis Jerrells (2013–2014; 2017–2019)
- (Jamaica) #24 Samardo Samuels (2013–2015)
- (Serbia) #13 Milan Mačvan (2015–2017)
- (Croatia) #43 Krunoslav Simon (2015–2017)
- (United States) #21 Rakim Sanders (2016–2017)
- (Lithuania) #9 Mantas Kalnietis (2016–2018)
- (United States) #0 Drew Goudelock (2017–2018)
- (Latvia) #45 Dairis Bertāns (2017–2019)
- (Lithuania) #77 Artūras Gudaitis (2017–2020)
- (Serbia) #5 Vladimir Micov (2017–2021)
- (United States) #2 Mike James (2018–2019)
- (Lithuania) #19 Mindaugas Kuzminskas (2018–2019)
- (Serbia) #16 Nemanja Nedović (2018–2020)
- (United States) (Italy) #32 Jeff Brooks (2018–2021)
- (Argentina) #40 Luis Scola (2019–2020)
- (Spain) #13 Sergio Rodriguez (2019–2022)
- (United States) #2 Zach LeDay (2020–2021, 2024–2026)
- (United States) #23 Malcolm Delaney (2020–2022)
- (United States) #42 Kyle Hines (2020–2024)
- (Denmark) #31 Shavon Shields (2020–2026)
- (Ghana) #50 Ben Bentil (2021–2022)
- (United States) #22 Devon Hall (2021–2024, 2026–present)
- (United States) #12 Billy Baron (2022–2024)
- (United States) #0 Brandon Davies (2022–2023)
- (Canada) #5 Kevin Pangos (2022–2023)
- (Germany) #77 Johannes Voigtmann (2022–2024)
- (Montenegro) #33 Nikola Mirotić (2023–2025)
- (United States) Freddie Gillespie (2024–2025)
- (United States) (Italy) #13 Darius Thompson (2026–present)
- (United States) #24 Garrison Mathews (2026–present)
- (United States) (North Macedonia) #5 Moses Wright (2026–present)
