= Dan Peterson =

American basketball coach (born 1936)

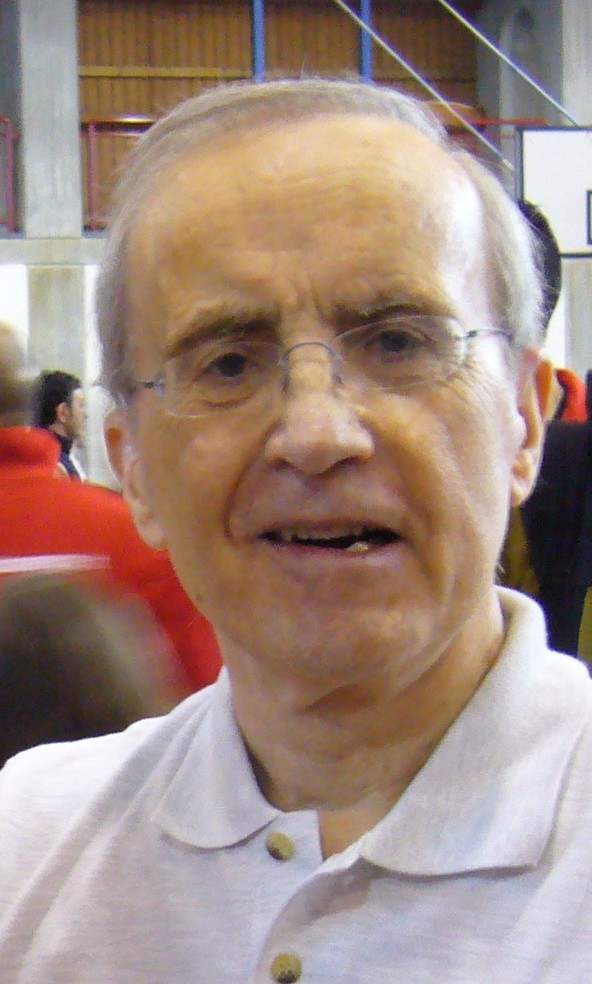
- Peterson in 2008

Personal information
- Born: January 9, 1936 (age 90) Evanston, Illinois, U.S.

Career information
- High school: Evanston Township (Evanston, Illinois)
- College: Northwestern
- Coaching career: 1962–1987, 2011

Career history

Coaching
- 1962–1963: McKendree (assistant)
- 1963–1965: Michigan State (assistant)
- 1965–1966: Navy (assistant)
- 1966–1971: Delaware
- 1971–1973: Chilean National Team
- 1973–1979: Virtus Bologna
- 1979–1987: Olimpia Milano
- 2011: Olimpia Milano

Career highlights
- EuroLeague champion (1987); European Coach of the Year (1987); 50 Greatest EuroLeague Contributors (2008); FIBA Korać Cup champion (1985); 5× Italian League champion (1976, 1982, 1985–1987); 3× Italian Cup winner (1974, 1986, 1987); 2× Italian Coach of the Year (1986, 1987); Italian Basketball Hall of Fame (2012); Illinois Basketball Hall of Fame (1995)

Daniel Lowell Peterson (born January 9, 1936) is an American former professional basketball head coach. He resigned from his most recent position as the head coach of Olimpia Milano in the Italian LBA after the team was eliminated in the semi-finals of the 2011 Italian league playoffs. The team then announced that he would assume another role with the club. He is nicknamed "The Coach" for his legacy in Italian basketball. Peterson was enshrined in the FIBA Hall of Fame in 2024.

== Biography ==
Peterson went to Evanston Township High School in Evanston, Illinois. He received his undergraduate degree from Northwestern University in Evanston and a master's degree from the University of Michigan.

He served as assistant coach for NAIA school McKendree College from 1962 to 1963. From 1963 to 1964 he served as freshmen coach at Michigan State. After MSU, for one season, he was plebe coach at the United States Naval Academy. The next year, at the age of 30, he became head coach at the University of Delaware. In five years there, he assembled a record of 69 wins and 49 losses.

In 1971, he went abroad, acting as head coach of the Chile national basketball team until 1973. Peterson took his Chilean team on a grueling tour of the United States in 1972. From 1973–1978, he coached Virtus Bologna in the Italian LBA, winning the 1974 Italian Basketball Cup and, in 1976, the Italian League title. In 1978, he was hired as head coach of Olimpia Milano, where he won four Italian League titles (1982, 1985, 1986, 1987), two more Italian Cups (1986, 1987), a Korać Cup (1985), and one European Champions Cup (EuroLeague) title, which is the highest title in Europe for pro club basketball.

In 1987, he retired after coaching in Italy for 14 years, but he resumed coaching on January 3, 2011, with Olimpia Milano. He still holds records for a coach in the Italian League playoffs, with 11 Final Four appearances in 11 years (after which a playoff format was introduced), 9 finals, 4 titles, 74 games coached, and 51 games won.

On January 3, 2011, he became the new head coach of Olimpia Milano, after the dismissal of Piero Bucchi. He left in June, succeeded by Sergio Scariolo.

== Commentator ==
After his retirement, he became a popular sports commentator (basket and pro wrestling) for major Italian television channels.

== Awards ==
He received the Coach of the Year award for Europe from the WABC and the Coach of the Year for Italy twice. Following his retirement from coaching, he was inducted into the Illinois Basketball Hall of Fame in 1995.

In 2007, Peterson was named a Distinguished Alumnus of Evanston Township High School.

In 2008, he was named one of the 50 most influential European club basketball personalities over the previous half-century.

== See also ==
- List of EuroLeague-winning head coaches
