= Sandro Gamba =

Italian basketball player & coach (born 1932)

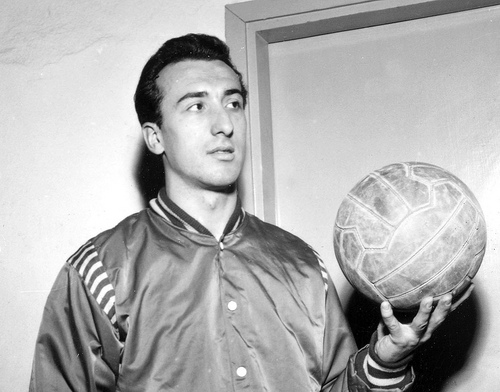
- Gamba, circa 1960.

Personal information
- Born: 3 June 1932 (age 94) Milan, Italy
- Listed height: 6 ft 2.75 in (1.90 m)
- Listed weight: 175 lb (79 kg)

Career information
- Playing career: 1950–1965
- Position: Small forward
- Coaching career: 1965–1992

Career history

Playing
- 1950–1963: Olimpia Milano
- 1963–1965: Milano 1958

Coaching
- 1965–1973: Olimpia Milano (assistant)
- 1973–1977: Varèse
- 1977–1980: Auxilium Torino
- 1979–1985: Italy
- 1985–1987: Virtus Bologna
- 1987–1992: Italy

Career highlights
- As player: 10× Italian League champion (1951–1954, 1957–1960, 1962, 1963); Italian Basketball Hall of Fame (2006); As head coach: 2× EuroLeague champion (1975, 1976); 2× FIBA European Selection (1991 2×); 2× Italian League champion (1974, 1977)
- Basketball Hall of Fame
- FIBA Hall of Fame
Medals
Men's basketball
Head coach for Italy
Olympic Games
| Silver medal – second place | 1980 Moscow |
EuroBasket
| Bronze medal – third place | 1985 West Germany |
| Gold medal – first place | 1983 France |
| Silver medal – second place | 1991 Italy |

Alessandro "Sandro" Gamba (born 3 June 1932) is an Italian former professional basketball player and coach. Gamba was a finalist for induction into the Naismith Memorial Basketball Hall of Fame in 2005, and was elected as a member in 2006. He was inducted in 2006 to the Italian Basketball Hall of Fame.

== Playing career ==
=== Clubs career ===
During his club career, Gamba spent most of his career with Olimpia Milano, they won ten LBA championships (1951–1954, 1957–1960, 1962–1963). He finished his career with Milano 1958.

=== Italy national team ===
Gamba debuted with the Italy national team in 1952 and captained at the 1960 Summer Olympic Games.

== Coaching career ==
Gamba retired from playing in 1965, and became a coach in the top-tier level Italian professional league (LBA) where he coached teams like Olimpia Milano (assistant coach, 1965–1973), Varese (1973–1977), Auxilium Torino (1977–1980), and Virtus Bologna (1985–1987). He led Varese to two LBA championships (1974 and 1977), and two FIBA European Champions Cup (EuroLeague) titles (1975 and 1976).

From 1979 to 1992, except for a hiatus in 1985–1987, Gamba was the head coach of the Italy national team, and led them to a silver medal at the Summer Olympic Games in 1980, 1984, 1988, and 1992. He also coached the national team at the EuroBasket seven times, winning a gold in 1983, a bronze in 1985, and a silver in 1991.

He was selected as a coach of the FIBA European Selection teams in 1991. He also worked as the coach of the "Rest of the World" team, at the Nike Hoop Summit.

== See also ==
- List of FIBA EuroBasket winning head coaches
- List of EuroLeague-winning head coaches
