= 1983–84 FIBA European Champions Cup =

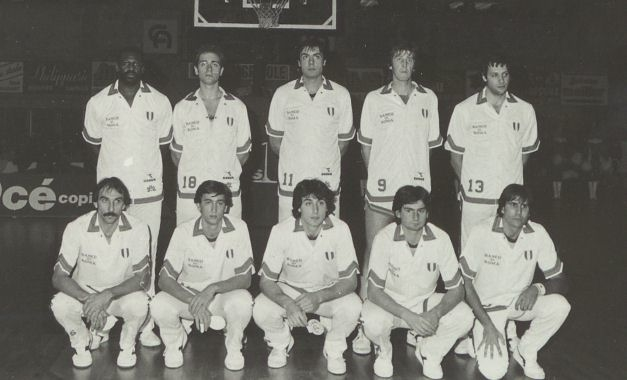
- League: FIBA European Champions Cup
- Sport: Basketball
- Duration: September 15, 1983 – March 29, 1984

Final
- Champions: (Italy) Banco di Roma (1st title)
- Runners-up: (Spain) FC Barcelona

FIBA European Champions Cup seasons
- ← 1982–83 1984–85 →

The 1983–84 FIBA European Champions Cup was the 27th season of the European Champions Cup club competition (now called EuroLeague). The Final was held at the Patinoire des Vernets in Geneva, Switzerland on March 29, 1984. Banco di Roma won its first title, defeating Spanish side, FC Barcelona, by a result of 79–73.

== Competition system ==
- 25 teams (European national domestic league champions, plus the then current title holders), playing in a tournament system, played knock-out rounds on a home and away basis. The aggregate score of both games decided the winner.
- The six remaining teams after the knock-out rounds entered a Semifinal Group Stage, which was played as a round-robin. The final standing was based on individual wins and defeats. In the case of a tie between two or more teams after the group stage, the following criteria were used: 1) number of wins in one-to-one games between the teams; 2) basket average between the teams; 3) general basket average within the group.
- The winner and the runner-up of the Semifinal Group Stage qualified for the final, which was played at a predetermined venue.

== Preliminary round ==
Team 1	Agg.	Team 2	1st leg	2nd leg
AEL (Cyprus)	105-203	(Greece) Aris	49–106	56–97

== First round ==
Team 1	Agg.	Team 2	1st leg	2nd leg
Torpan Pojat (Finland)	167-189	(Scotland) Murray Edinburgh	82–89	85–100
Efes Pilsen (Turkey)	183-211	(Spain) FC Barcelona	96–111	87–100
Partizani Tirana (Albania)	180-163	(Czechoslovakia) Inter Slovnaft	89–80	91–83
T71 Dudelange (Luxembourg)	84-157	(Italy) Banco di Roma	40–72	44–85
CSKA Sofia (Bulgaria)	150-151	(Belgium) Sunair Oostende	74–62	76–89
Nyon (Switzerland)	154-204	(Italy) Jollycolombani Cantù	82–89	72–115
Klosterneuburg (Austria)	151-168	(Socialist Federal Republic of Yugoslavia) Bosna	76–77	75–91
Alvik (Sweden)	155-158	(England) Austin Rover Sunderland	80–77	75–81
Århus (Denmark)	147-278	(Israel) Maccabi Elite Tel Aviv	85–145	62–133
ASC 1846 Göttingen (West Germany)	150-168	(Greece) Aris	77–91	73–77
Dinamo București (Romania)	148-176	(France) Limoges CSP	83–97	65–79
Honvéd (Hungary)	150-195	(Netherlands) Nashua EBBC	82–101	68–94

== Second round ==
Team 1	Agg.	Team 2	1st leg	2nd leg
Murray Edinburgh (Scotland)	178-185	(Spain) FC Barcelona	93–94	85–91
Partizani Tirana (Albania)	124-171	(Italy) Banco di Roma	69–78	55–93
Sunair Oostende (Belgium)	147-152	(Italy) Jollycolombani Cantù	88–77	59–76
Austin Rover Sunderland (England)	171-177	(Socialist Federal Republic of Yugoslavia) Bosna	89–93	82–84
Aris (Greece)	138-143	(Israel) Maccabi Elite Tel Aviv	62-68	76–75
Nashua EBBC (Netherlands)	149-167	(France) Limoges CSP	70–69	79–98

== Semifinal group stage ==
Key to colors
Top two places in the group advance to Final

	Team	Pld	Pts	W	L	PF	PA
1.	(Spain) FC Barcelona	10	17	7	3	910	825
2.	(Italy) Banco di Roma	10	17	7	3	785	752
3.	(Italy) Jollycolombani Cantù	10	16	6	4	865	826
4.	(Socialist Federal Republic of Yugoslavia) Bosna	10	15	5	5	843	928
5.	(Israel) Maccabi Elite Tel Aviv	10	13	3	7	872	902
6.	(France) Limoges CSP	10	12	2	8	937	979

== Final ==
March 29, Patinoire des Vernets, Geneva

Team 1	Score	Team 2
FC Barcelona (Spain)	73–79	(Italy) Banco di Roma

1983–84 FIBA European Champions Cup
Champions

Banco di Roma
1st Title

== Awards ==
=== FIBA European Champions Cup Finals Top Scorer ===
- (Spain) J.A. San Epifanio "Epi" ( (Spain) FC Barcelona)
