= Zoran Čutura =

Croatian basketball player

Personal information
- Born: 12 March 1962 (age 64) Zadar, SR Croatia, SFR Yugoslavia
- Listed height: 2.02 m (6 ft 8 in)

Career information
- Playing career: 1978–1995
- Position: Small forward / power forward

Career history
- 1978–1981: Industromontaža / Monting
- 1981–1993: Cibona
- 1993–1995: Croatia Osiguranje

Career highlights
- 2× EuroLeague champion (1985, 1986); 2× Saporta Cup champion (1982, 1987); 3× Yugoslav League champion (1982, 1984, 1985); Croatian League champion (1992); 5× Yugoslav Cup winner (1982, 1983, 1985, 1986, 1988); Croatian Cup winner (1994)

Zoran Čutura (born 12 March 1962 in Zagreb) is a former Croatian basketball player. After ending his professional basketball career he started working as a sports journalist and columnist.

== Professional career ==
Čutura started playing basketball in his hometown Zagreb. His first club was the second division club Industromontaža where he spent three years. In 1981 he joined the Zagreb powerhouse Cibona where Mirko Novosel was starting to build the future European champion team with players like the veteran Krešimir Ćosić, Aleksandar Petrović, Dražen Petrović, Andro Knego, Mihovil Nakić and Branko Vukićević. This team won two back-to-back European Champions Cups in 1985 and 1986.

In his first season in Cibona (1981–82), Čutura won a triple crown: the Yugoslav Cup by defeating Bosna in the final, the Yugoslav League by winning in the first play-off organized by the Basketball Federation of Yugoslavia and the European Cup Winners' Cup by defeating Real Madrid in the final. He won another Yugoslav Cup in 1983 and another Yugoslav League trophy in 1984. The second triple crown came in 1985, this time including the European champion title. For their second European trophy Cibona defeated Real Madrid in the final again with Čutura scoring 16 points.

Čutura won his second European champion title in 1986 participating with 16 points in the final victory against Žalgiris.

Čutura won two more Yugoslav Cups in 1986 and 1988 as well as another European Cup Winners' Cup in 1987. In the final victory against Scavolini Pesaro he scored six points. His last trophy with Cibona was the Croatian League in 1992.

In 1993, after 12 seasons spent in Cibona, Čutura moved to Split where he spent two seasons before retiring. With Split he won his last trophy—the Croatian Cup in 1994.

== National team career ==
Čutura played with the Yugoslavia national basketball team at the 1979 European Championship for Cadets where his team took gold. He was the team's leading scorer with a 23.9 points average. Čutura's second major tournament was the first World Under-19 Championship, held the same year in Brazil where Yugoslavia finished fourth. His teammates included Željko Obradović, Goran Grbović and Zoran Radović. He was the team's top scorer with 16.3 ppg. He was once again the top scorer (22.8 p) of his team (even though still playing for a second division club) at the 1980 European Championship for Juniors where he won silver.

Čutura's first major senior tournament was the 1985 EuroBasket where Yugoslavia took seventh place.

Čutura won his first senior medal at the 1986 World Championship where he played in a talent-packed team alongside Dražen Petrović, Aleksandar Petrović, Dražen Dalipagić, Vlade Divac, Danko Cvjetićanin and others. Yugoslavia took bronze with Čutura contributing 10.3 ppg.

Head coach Krešimir Ćosić did not call-up Čutura for the 1987 EuroBasket, but Čutura was back on the team at the 1988 Summer Olympics under coach Dušan Ivković. Yugoslavia took silver with Čutura making 8.2 ppg. At the 1989 Eurobasket played in front of his hometown crowd Čutura (5.0 ppg) along with Dražen Petrović, Dino Rađa, Žarko Paspalj, Vlade Divac, Predrag Danilović, Toni Kukoč, Jure Zdovc and others took gold.

Čutura's last major tournament was the 1990 World Championship where Yugoslavia were crowned champions. Čutura averaged 4.8 ppg. After the breakup of Yugoslavia, Čutura never made a major tournament squad for the Croatia national basketball team.

== After basketball ==
After his professional basketball career, Čutura started working as a sports journalist and columnist. In 2008 he won a prize for the best Croatian sports journalist while writing for Jutarnji list.

== Personal life ==
Čutura is married to Gordana Gojnić-Čutura, a former Croatia women's national volleyball team player.

He is the father of Tomislav, a former basketball player at Lycoming College in Pennsylvania and Hana, a professional volleyball player, occasional Croatia women's national volleyball team player and former student of the University of California, Berkeley. While she studied she played for the Golden Bear volleyball team that was a semifinalist at the 2007 NCAA Division I women's volleyball tournament Final Four, as well as being the 2009 Pac-10 Player of the Year.
