= Danko Cvjetićanin =

Croatian basketball scout and player

Brooklyn Nets
- Title: Scout
- League: NBA

Personal information
- Born: 16 October 1963 (age 63) Zagreb, SR Croatia, SFR Yugoslavia
- Listed height: 1.98 m (6 ft 6 in)
- Listed weight: 90 kg (198 lb)

Career information
- NBA draft: 1985: undrafted
- Playing career: 1980–1997
- Position: Shooting guard

Career history
- 1980–1985: Partizan
- 1985–1992: Cibona
- 1992–1994: Estudiantes
- 1994: Kvarner Rijeka
- 1994–1995: Reggio Emilia
- 1996–1997: Zrinjevac

Career highlights
- EuroLeague champion (1986); Saporta Cup winner (1987); Yugoslav League champion (1981); Croatian League champion (1992); 2× Yugoslav Cup winner (1986, 1988)
Medals
Representing Yugoslavia
Olympic Games
Silver medal – second place	1988 Seoul	Team
World Championship
Bronze medal – third place	1986 Spain	Team
European Championship
Bronze medal – third place	1987 Greece	Team
European Championship for Juniors
Silver medal – second place	1982 Bulgaria	Team
Representing Croatia
Olympic Games
Silver medal – second place	1992 Barcelona	Team
World Championship
Bronze medal – third place	1994 Canada	Team
European Championship
Bronze medal – third place	1993 Germany	Team

Danko Cvjetićanin (often credited as Cvjetičanin; born 16 October 1963) is a Croatian basketball scout and former player.

Cvjetićanin won two silver medals at the Olympic Games, one with Yugoslavia (1988) and the other with Croatia (1992). Cvjetićanin, who started his career with Partizan, won the European Club Championship with Cibona in 1986. He also played professionally in Spain and Italy.

== Early life ==
Born in Zagreb, six-year-old Cvjetićanin moved to the Yugoslav capital Belgrade along with his parents and sister when his sociologist father Vladimir Cvjetićanin, whose areas of study primarily focused on the social structure of the Yugoslav population, took a management position at the state-owned Ivo Lola Ribar metallurgical factory in the Belgrade suburb of Železnik.

Growing up during the 1970s in Belgrade, Cvjetićanin attended the Drinka Pavlović Primary School. Being a tall yet mobile kid, he soon took up basketball in the OKK Beograd youth categories before transferring to KK Partizan's youth system where he was coached by Duško Vujošević. While playing youth basketball in the late 1970s, teenage Cvjetićanin idolized two Yugoslav basketball stars with body type and skill set similar to his own—Dragan Kićanović and Mirza Delibašić.

== Club playing career ==
=== KK Partizan ===
Cvjetićanin began his basketball career with KK Partizan. He won Yugoslav League in 1981 with Partizan.

=== KK Cibona ===
In 1985, right before his 22nd birthday, Cvjetićanin transferred to KK Cibona, reigning European Champions Cup and Yugoslav League champions. The transfer was precipitated by his parents moving back to Zagreb.

Arriving to Cibona as replacement at shooting guard for Aco Petrović who was away serving his mandatory Yugoslav People's Army (JNA) stint, Cvjetićanin made his club debut in November 1985 during week 5 of the league season versus lowly Sloga Kraljevo, scoring 36 points. He then saw reduced playing time versus KK Zadar, leading to antagonism with Cibona head coach Željko Pavličević, a temporary conflict that saw Cvjetićanin not show up for the team's post-game meeting in protest. Accepting criticism over his application on the defensive end, Cvjetićanin was soon reinstated.

== National team ==
=== Youth ===
Together with fellow Yugoslav league youth prospects Dražen Petrović, Stojko Vranković, Velimir Perasović, Zoran Jovanović, Goran Sobin, and Ivo Petović, Partizan player Cvjetićanin made the Rusmir Halilović-coached Yugoslavia junior national team that got silver at the 1982 FIBA European Junior Championship in Dimitrovgrad and Haskovo, Bulgaria.

=== Full squad ===
Cvjetićanin made Yugoslavia's national team for the 1988 Olympics in Seoul led by head coach Dušan Ivković. Appearing in 8 games at the tournament, the shooting guard received significant minutes, contributing 9.8 points per game—thus being the team's fourth best scorer at the tournament behind Dražen Petrović, Vlade Divac, and Žarko Paspalj—as Yugoslavia made the final where they lost to Soviet Union.

Playing in the backcourt with his Cibona club teammate Dražen Petrović or Partizan's Željko Obradović, Cvjetićanin's best scoring outing came at the preliminary group stage with 18 points versus the minnows of the group, South Korea. He also had an important 16-point contribution (on 83.3% field goal percentage including 4 of 4 three-pointers) in the quarter-final versus Canada in only 17 minutes of action, taking advantage of Canada's defensive focus on Yugoslavia's star player and leading scorer, Petrović.

== Post-playing career ==
After playing career, Cvjetićanin worked as the European scouting coordinator for the NBA's Philadelphia 76ers from 1998 to 2010. He has been performing the same position for the New Jersey Nets since 2010.

== Personal life ==
Cvjetićanin married Nika Antunac. In January 1993, while Cvjetićanin was playing professionally with CB Estudiantes, their son, Filip, was born in Spain. Following in his father's footsteps, Filip Cvjetićanin would end up pursuing basketball as well, starting out in the Estudiantes youth categories before switching to college basketball in the United States at the Florida Gulf Coast University.

After divorcing Antunac, Cvjetićanin married Marga Pirjać. The couple has two children, daughter Lana (born in 2014) and son Tin (born in 2016).
