= Franjo Arapović =

Croatian basketball player (born 1965)

Member of Parliament
- In office 22 December 2003 – 11 January 2008
- Parliamentary group: Croatian Democratic Union
- Constituency: I electoral district

Personal details
- Born: 2 June 1965 (age 61) Slipčići, SR Bosnia and Herzegovina, SFR Yugoslavia
- Height: 2.15 m (7 ft 1/2 in)
- Spouse: Nataly-Suzan Plazibat
- Children: Marko; Matea
- Basketball career

Career information
- NBA draft: 1987: 7th round, 159th overall pick
- Drafted by: Atlanta Hawks
- Position: Center

Career history
- 1983–1993: Cibona
- 1993–1994: Croatia Osiguranje
- 1994–1995: Zrinjevac
- 1995–1996: Trapani
- 1996–1998: Žalgiris
- 1998–1999: Antalya BB
- 1999–2000: Olimpija Osijek
- 2000: Hapoel Jerusalem
- 2000–2001: Krka
- 2001–2002: Triglav Osiguranje

Career highlights
- 2× EuroLeague champion (1985, 1986); 2× Saporta Cup (1987, 1998); 2× Yugoslav League champion (1984, 1985); 2× Croatian League champion (1992, 1993); 2× Lithuanian League champion (1997, 1998); 3× Yugoslav Cup winner (1985, 1986, 1988); Croatian Cup winner (1994)
- Stats at Basketball Reference
Medals
Men's basketball
Representing Yugoslavia
Olympic Games
| Silver medal – second place | 1988 Seoul | Team |
World Championship
| Bronze medal – third place | 1986 Spain | Team |
Universiade
| Gold medal – first place | 1987 Zagreb | Team |
European Championship for Juniors
| Bronze medal – third place | 1984 Sweden | Team |
Representing Croatia
Olympic Games
| Silver medal – second place | 1992 Barcelona | Team |

Franjo Arapović (born 2 June 1965) is a Croatian former professional basketball player who played as a center. A 7 ft 0.5 in (2.15 m) tall, he won the silver medal with the Croatia national team at the 1992 Summer Olympics. Four years earlier he was a member of the Yugoslavia national team, that won the silver medal at the 1988 Summer Olympics.

Arapović was born in Mostar, SR Bosnia and Herzegovina, SFR Yugoslavia. In his professional career, he played for KK Lokomotiva Mostar, after which he moved to Croatian clubs Cibona, Croatia Osiguranje Split and Zrinjevac. He then moved to Pallacanestro Trapani in Italy, BC Žalgiris in Lithuania, Krka Telekom in Slovenia, Fenerbahçe in Turkey, Hapoel Migdal Jerusalem in Israel, again Žalgiris, and again Zrinjevac, Croatia Osiguranje Split and Cibona.

One of Arapović's most well-known moments was during the first half of the gold medal game between Croatia and the United States at the 1992 Summer Olympics, when Arapović caught a pass from Toni Kukoč while driving toward the basket and made a running two-handed slam dunk to give Croatia a 25–23 lead over the Dream Team. David Robinson was whistled for a foul on the play, and Arapović demonstratively hung on the rim for several moments before giving the cheering crowd several fist-pumps.

Member of Croatian Democratic Union (HDZ), Arapović was their MP in the Croatian Parliament from December 2003 until January 2008. His son Marko is also a professional basketball player.
