= Ivo Nakić =

Croatian basketball player

Personal information
- Born: May 26, 1966 (age 60) Rijeka, SR Croatia, SFR Yugoslavia
- Listed height: 2.00 m (6 ft 7 in)

Career information
- NBA draft: 1988: undrafted
- Playing career: 1983–2001
- Position: Small forward

Career history
- 1983–1986: Cibona
- 1986–1992: Partizan
- 1992–1993: Cibona
- 1993–1994: Manresa
- 1994–1995: Hapoel Tzvat
- 1995–1997: Krško
- 1997–1998: Kvarner
- 1998: DJK Würzburg
- 1998–2000: Krka
- 2000–2001: Pivovarna Laško

Career highlights
- 3× EuroLeague champion (1985, 1986, 1992); FIBA Korać Cup winner (1989); 4× Yugoslav League champion (1984, 1985, 1987, 1992); 4× Yugoslav Cup winner (1985, 1986, 1989, 1992); Croatian League champion (1993); Slovenian League champion (2000)
Medals
Men's basketball
Representing Yugoslavia
European Championship for Juniors
Bronze medal – third place	1984 Sweden	Team
European Championship for Cadets
Gold medal – first place	1983 West Germany	Team

Ivo Nakić (born May 26, 1966) is a Croatian former professional basketball player. Standing at 2.00 m, he played as a small forward.

== Personal life ==
Nakić married Zorica Desnica who had previously been engaged to professional tennis player Slobodan "Boba" Živojinović whom she had also had a son, Filip. Desnica and Nakić later had a son Mario, also a professional basketball player, and a daughter, Iva.

Nakić lives in Belgrade and works as an agent in Bill Duffy's BDA Sports Management agency.
