= Željko Pavličević =

Croatian basketball coach and player

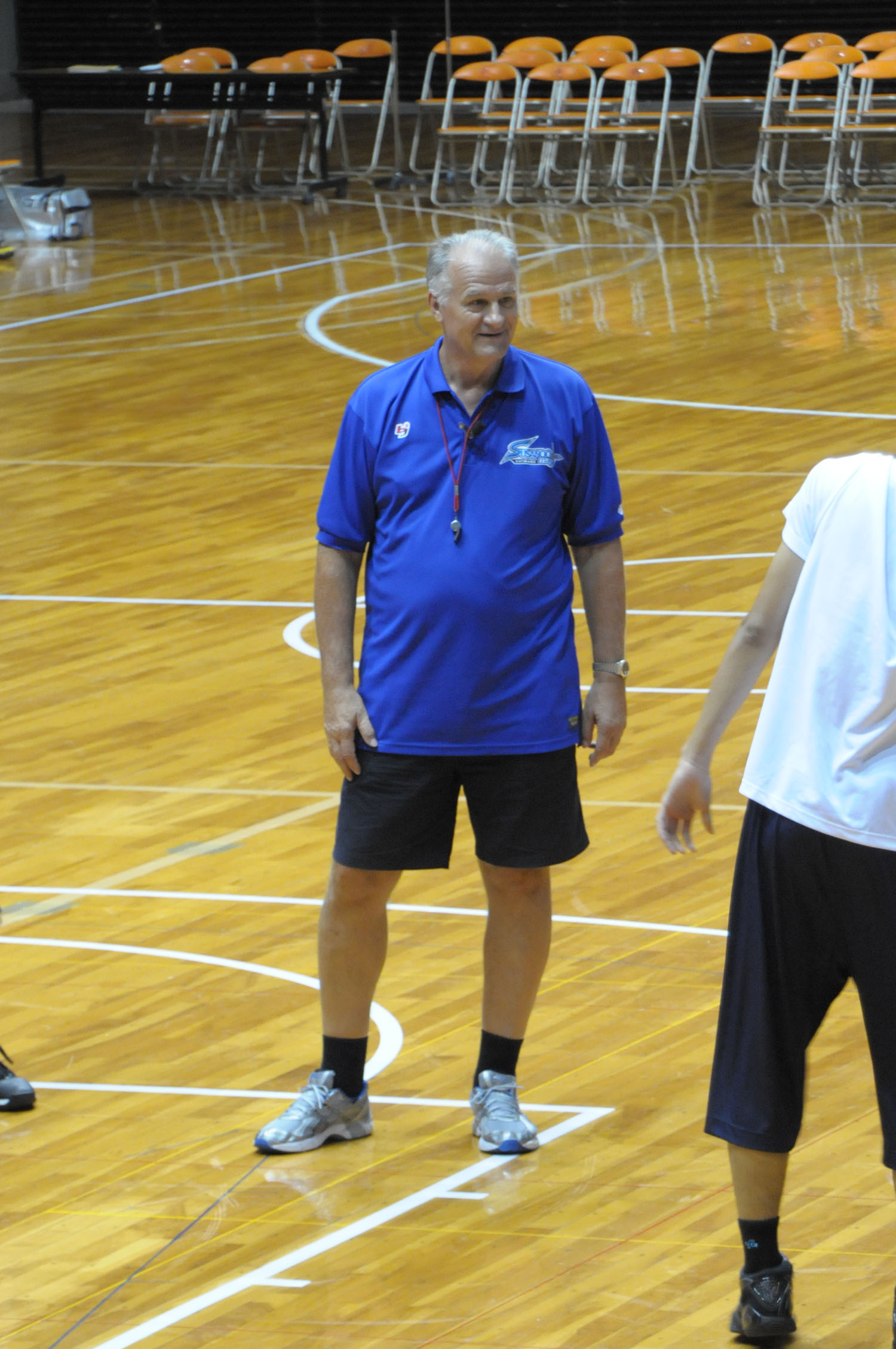
- Pavličević with Shimane Susanoo Magic in 2012

Personal information
- Born: 26 March 1951 (age 75) Zagreb, PR Croatia, FPR Yugoslavia
- Listed height: 6 ft 4 in (1.93 m)

Career information
- Playing career: 1969–1975
- Position: Shooting guard/Coach
- Coaching career: 1975–2023

Career history

Playing
- 1969–1975: Lokomotiva

Coaching
- 1975–1984: Cibona (assistant)
- 1985–1986: Cibona
- 1986–1987: OAR Ferrol
- 1989–1990: TAU Vitoria
- 1990–1991: Pop 84
- 1991–1993: Panathinaikos
- 1996–1997: Split CO
- 2003–2006: Japan
- 2007–2008: Zagreb
- 2010–2013: Shimane Susanoo Magic
- 2013–2014: Wakayama Trians
- 2015–2016: Chiba Jets
- 2017–2018: Bambitious Nara
- 2019–2020: Al-Muharraq
- 2021–2023: Eastern

Career highlights
- As head coach: 2× EuroLeague champion (1986, 1991); 2× Yugoslav League champion (1985, 1991); 3× Yugoslav Cup winner (1985, 1986, 1991); Greek Cup winner (1993); Croatian Cup winner (2008); ABL champion (2023); ABL Coach of the Year (2023)

Željko Pavličević (born 26 March 1951) is a Croatian former professional basketball coach and former player.

== Early life ==
Pavličević began playing basketball in 1969 for the junior team of Lokomotiva in the city of Zagreb. He was studying at the Faculty of Chemical Technology at the basketball school.

== Coaching career ==
=== Cibona ===
Having passed all the categories in the club, (cadets, juniors etc.) in 1975, Pavličević became Mirko Novosel's assistant coach in the senior team of Cibona (until then WIT). In 1984–85 he was promoted to head coach, but only in domestic competitions (in EuroLeague led Mirko Novosel).

In his first season as head coach with Cibona, won the Yugoslav Cup and the Yugoslav League (against Jugoplastika & Crvena zvezda ). As assistant coach he took part in the winning of the first title of European Champions Cup (the predecessor of today's EuroLeague) with Cibona in Athens Peace and Friendship Stadium against Real Madrid. The following season, (1985–86) as head coach of Cibona both in domestic and European competitions and with the roster weakened by the loss of Andro Knego in Cajamadrid, but refreshed with newcomer Dražen Petrović, won the Yugoslav Cup and became back to back European champion in Budapest against the Soviet champions Žalgiris. This match was marked by the participation of the two best European players, Petrović and the Lithuanian center Arvydas Sabonis.

=== Spain ===
After the three seasons with Cibona, Pavličević accepted his first international bid and coached the Spanish club OAR Ferrol, later becoming the club's sports director. During the 1989–90 season, he was hired by the Spanish first league club of Taugrés Vitoria.

=== Pop 84 ===
In the summer of 1990, Pavličević accepted the offer from back-to-back European champions of Pop 84 the former Jugoplastika to lead the team following the exodus of Dino Rađa (il Messaggero Roma), Duško Ivanović (Girona) and Goran Sobin (Aris). Despite the changes, Pop 84 dominated and won all three trophies. Yugoslav Cup (finals with Cibona), the Yugoslav League (final playoffs against the rising power of Partizan) and third European title for the club and other personal title against FC Barcelona in Paris. He was awarded coach of the year. Players included Toni Kukoč, Zoran Savić, Velimir Perasović, Zoran Sretenović, Žan Tabak, Petar Naumoski and Luka Pavićević. Božidar Maljković led Barcelona, which is connected to Split by winning the previous two league titles in Europe.

=== Panathinaikos ===
For the 1991–92 season, Pavličević joined Panathinaikos and created the backbone of the club's future success. In 1992–93 with the arrival of Nikos Galis, Stojan Vranković, Arijan Komazec and Tiit Sokk the team won only the Greek Cup against Aris. The Championship final against arch-rival Olympiacos was controversial, given the club's decision not to play a third decisive game. The next season (1993–94) despite the coming of Alexander Volkov and participation in the Final Four of Tel Aviv, he was fired in late 1993.

=== Decline ===
Pavličević was sports director of selection for the Basketball Association of Croatia from 1996 to 1998. At the invitation of Croatia Osiguranje during the 1996–97 season he coached the team again. In early 2003 Japanese Basketball Federation offered him a position coaching the Japanese national basketball team. It was a cycle of four years as a preparation for the World Basketball Championship in Japan in 2006. The national team progressed significantly, and held the largest seminar for coaches in the history of Japan with over 900 participants. In 2007–08 he coached Zagreb, with which he won the Krešimir Ćosić Cup, the first trophy in the club's history.

At the invitation of Shimane Susanoo Club Magica, member BJL (Japanese professional league) in summer 2010, he became head coach and remained for three seasons, reaching the playoffs each season. He coached Wakayama Trians NBL National basketball L. Japan in 2013–14.

== Coaching record ==
Legend
Regular season	G	Games coached	W	Games won	L	Games lost	W–L %	Win–loss %
Playoffs	PG	Playoff games	PW	Playoff wins	PL	Playoff losses	PW–L %	Playoff win–loss %

Team	Year	G	W	L	W–L%	Finish	PG	PW	PL	PW–L%	Result
Shimane Susanoo Magic	2010–11	50	24	26	.480	6th in Western	2	0	2	.000	Lost in 1st round
Shimane Susanoo Magic	2011–12	52	28	24	.538	6th in Western	3	1	2	.333	Lost in 1st round
Shimane Susanoo Magic	2012–13	52	33	19	.635	3rd in Western	4	2	2	.500	Lost in 2nd round
Wakayama Trians	2013–14	54	41	13	.759	1st in Western	6	2	4	.333	Runners-up in NBL
Chiba Jets	2015–16	34	13	21	.382	Fired	-	-	-	–	-
Bambitious Nara	2017–18	34	7	27	.206	Fired	-	-	-	–	-

== Career achievements ==
=== Club competitions ===
- FIBA European Champions Cup: 2 (with Cibona: 1985–86 and Pop 84: 1990–91)
- Yugoslav League: 2 (with Cibona: 1984–85 and Pop 84: 1990–91)
- Yugoslav Cup: 3 (with Cibona: 1984–85, 1985–86 and Pop 84: 1990–91)
- Greek Cup: 1 (with Panathinaikos: 1992–93)
- Croatian Cup: 1 (with Zagreb: 2007–08)
- ABL: 1 (with Eastern: 2023)

== See also ==
- List of EuroLeague-winning head coaches
