= 1983–84 Yugoslav First Basketball League =

- League: Yugoslav First Basketball League
- Sport: Basketball
- Duration: 8 October 1983 – 10 March 1984 (Regular season); 15 March – 21 April 1984 (Playoffs)

Regular season
- Season champions: (Socialist Republic of Croatia) Cibona

Playoffs
- Finals champions: (Socialist Republic of Croatia) Cibona
- Runners-up: Crvena Zvezda

Yugoslav First Basketball League seasons
- ← 1982–83 1984–85 →

The 1983–84 Yugoslav First Basketball League season was the 40th season of the Yugoslav First Basketball League, the highest professional basketball league in SFR Yugoslavia.

== Teams ==
(Socialist Republic of Croatia) SR Croatia

- Cibona
- Jugoplastika
- Šibenka
- Zadar

(Socialist Republic of Serbia) SR Serbia

- Borac Čačak
- Crvena Zvezda
- IMT
- Partizan

(Socialist Republic of Bosnia and Herzegovina) SR Bosnia and Herzegovina

- Bosna

(Socialist Republic of Macedonia) SR Macedonia

- Rabotnički

(Socialist Republic of Montenegro) SR Montenegro

- Budućnost

(Socialist Republic of Slovenia) SR Slovenia

- Smelt Olimpija

== Regular season ==
=== Classification ===
Pos	Teams	Pld	W	L	PF	PA	Pts	Playoffs or relegation
1.	Cibona	22	16	6	1958	1818	32	Advance to Playoffs quarterfinal
2.	Crvena Zvezda	22	14	8	2063	1928	28	Advance to Playoffs quarterfinal
3.	Zadar	22	13	9	2034	1956	26	Advance to Playoffs quarterfinal
4.	Šibenka	22	13	9	1860	1859	26	Advance to Playoffs quarterfinal
5.	Bosna	22	13	9	1980	1923	26	Advance to Playoffs quarterfinal
6.	Borac Čačak	22	11	11	1918	1924	22	Advance to Playoffs quarterfinal
7.	Partizan	22	10	12	1953	1973	20	Advance to single-game Play-in
8.	Budućnost	22	10	12	1747	1867	20	Advance to single-game Play-in
9.	IMT	22	9	13	1919	1938	18	
10.	Jugoplastika	22	9	13	1828	1850	18	
11.	Rabotnički	22	8	14	1873	1997	16	Relegated
12.	Smelt Olimpija	22	6	16	1867	1967	12	Relegated

== Results ==
Home \ Away	CIB	CZV	ZAD	ŠIB	BOS	BOR	PAR	BUD	IMT	JUG	RAB	OLI
Cibona	—	93–91	97–89	92–80	98–89	104–95	88–77	84–74	104–100	96–78	111–85	93–73
Crvena Zvezda	79–85	—	86–85	102–80	90–82	83–73	105–92	83–84	83–76	81–72	104–91	112–96
Zadar	95–84	98–94	—	82–72	102–90	105–93	82–97	97–89	100–84	92–81	97–78	131–100
Šibenka	80–79	83–100	91–81	—	90–71	79–76	95–94	105–82	101–90	80–70	84–73	86–77
Bosna	103–85	98–91	95–98	82–83	—	87–85	108–86	99–100	100–98	84–74	86–78	92–90
Borac Čačak	90–89	83–78	93–85	93–84	85–84	—	98–94	103–89	73–71	96–91	106–90	88–91
Partizan	89–90	77–75	93–86	90–84	80–90	79–78	—	94–83	82–89	87–97	84–82	108–94
Budućnost	66–65	87–93	85–86	71–66	73–91	81–74	82–81	—	78–71	79–77	80–62	82–79
IMT	73–82	127–131	93–88	85–95	88–82	84–82	90–99	86–66	—	75–60	97–83	77–72
Jugoplastika	87–86	91–107	76–70	99–80	69–75	98–84	91–76	88–62	99–89	—	89–83	73–77
Rabotnički	71–74	93–92	96–95	83–78	91–101	106–91	99–98	89–78	84–79	95–86	—	94–98
Olimpija	68–81	82–102	89–90	81–85	89–91	72–79	85–96	94–74	84–87	91–77	85–69	—

Source: Koš magazin
Legend: Blue = home team win; Red = away team win.
Matches with lighter background shading were decided after overtime.

== Playoff ==
Teams placed 1st to 6th at the end of the regular season automatically qualified for the playoffs quarterfinal round.

The remaining two spots for the playoffs quarterfinal round were determined through a four-team play-in. The 7th and 8th-placed teams had to play a single-game round against the Second League 2nd and 1st-placed teams, respectively, that managed to gain promotion for the next season's top league competition. Seventh-placed Partizan from the First League thus played 2nd-placed Sloga Kraljevo from the Second League. Similarly, 8th-placed Budućnost from the First League played 1st-placed Radnički Belgrade from the Second League. The winners of each respective game qualified for the playoffs quarterfinal.

Single game play-in qualifying
8	Budućnost	66
B1	Radnički	83
7	Partizan	99
B2	Sloga	93

Quarterfinals
1	Cibona	101	89	101
8	Radnički	88	91	89
4	Šibenka	88	68
5	Bosna	94	84
2	Crvena zvezda	93	90
7	Partizan	79	88
3	Zadar	91	118
6	Borac Čačak	83	97

Semifinals
1	Cibona	99	83	77
5	Bosna	89	85	75
2	Crvena zvezda	112	98	112
3	Zadar	90	99	84

Finals
1	Cibona	78	79	72
2	Crvena zvezda	76	87	71

SINGLE GAME PLAY-IN QUALIFYING (played in Hala Jezero, Kragujevac)

Budućnost-Radnički 66-83

Partizan-Sloga 99-93

QUARTERFINALS

Cibona-Radnički 101–88, 89–91, 101–89

Crvena zvezda-Partizan 93–79, 90–88

Zadar-Borac Čačak 91–83, 118–97

Šibenka-Bosna 88–94, 68–84

SEMIFINALS

Cibona-Bosna 99–89, 83–85, 77–75

Crvena zvezda-Zadar 112–90, 98–99, 112–84

FINALS

Cibona-Crvena zvezda 78–76, 79–87, 72–71

The winning roster of Cibona:

- (Socialist Federal Republic of Yugoslavia) Mihovil Nakić
- (Socialist Federal Republic of Yugoslavia) Aleksandar Petrović
- (Socialist Federal Republic of Yugoslavia) Adnan Bečić
- (Socialist Federal Republic of Yugoslavia) Damir Pavličević
- (Socialist Federal Republic of Yugoslavia) Andro Knego
- (Socialist Federal Republic of Yugoslavia) Sven Ušić
- (Socialist Federal Republic of Yugoslavia) Rajko Gospodnetić
- (Socialist Federal Republic of Yugoslavia) Zoran Čutura
- (Socialist Federal Republic of Yugoslavia) Mladen Cetinja
- (Socialist Federal Republic of Yugoslavia) Miro Jelavić
- (Socialist Federal Republic of Yugoslavia) Marjan Nikšić
- (Socialist Federal Republic of Yugoslavia) Franjo Arapović
- (Socialist Federal Republic of Yugoslavia) Joško Vukičević
- (Socialist Federal Republic of Yugoslavia) Ivo Nakić
- (Socialist Federal Republic of Yugoslavia) Branko Vukićević

Coach: (Socialist Federal Republic of Yugoslavia) Mirko Novosel

== Qualification in 1984–85 season European competitions ==
FIBA European Champions Cup

- Cibona (champions)

FIBA Cup Winners' Cup

- Bosna (Cup winners)

FIBA Korać Cup

- Crvena Zvezda (2nd)
- Zadar (3rd)
- Šibenka (4th)
- Borac Čačak (6th)

== Basketball Cup ==
=== Bracket ===
Eightfinals
Smelt Olimpija	97
Partizan	96
Mrakovica Prijedor
Budućnost
Kombinat Zrenjanin	96
Bosna	113
IMT	92
Libela Celje	80
Borac Čačak	85
MZT Skopje	80
Alkar	78
Šibenka	77
Zadar
Jugoplastika
Cibona	83
Crvena zvezda	57

Quarterfinals
Smelt Olimpija	84
Budućnost	75
Bosna
IMT
Borac Čačak	60
Alkar	62
Zadar	71
Cibona	63

Semifinals
Smelt Olimpija
Bosna
Alkar	82
Zadar	81

Finals
Bosna	92
Alkar	78
