= Aleksandar Petrović (basketball, born February 1959) =

Croatian basketball coach and player

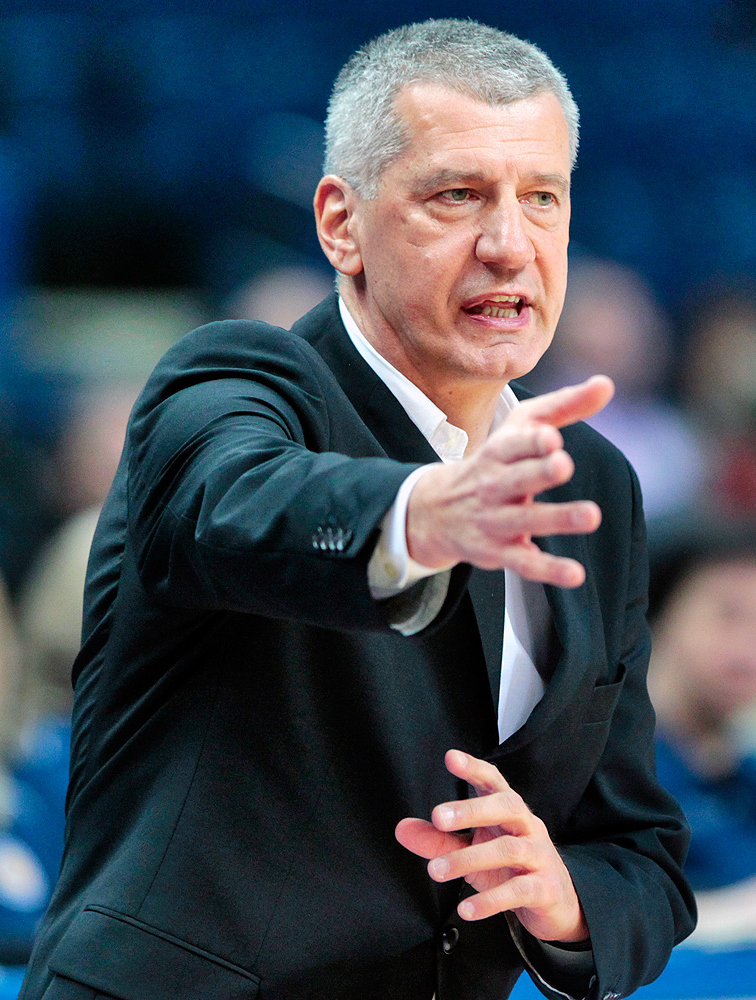
- Petrović coaching Lietuvos rytas in 2014

Personal information
- Born: 16 February 1959 (age 67) Šibenik, PR Croatia, FPR Yugoslavia
- Listed height: 1.94 m (6 ft 4 in)
- Listed weight: 86 kg (190 lb)

Career information
- Playing career: 1974–1991
- Position: Point guard / shooting guard
- Coaching career: 1991–present

Career history

Playing
- 1974–1976: Šibenka
- 1976–1987: Cibona
- 1987–1988: VL Pesaro
- 1988–1989: Cibona
- 1989–1990: Novi Zagreb
- 1990–1991: Racing Luxembourg

Coaching
- 1991–1995: Cibona
- 1995: Croatia
- 1995–1997: Sevilla
- 1997–1999: Cibona
- 1999–2001: Croatia
- 2001–2002: Włocławek
- 2004–2005: Lleida
- 2006: Scafati
- 2007–2008: Zadar
- 2010–2011: Cedevita
- 2012–2013: Bosnia and Herzegovina
- 2012–2013: Cedevita
- 2013–2014: Lietuvos rytas
- 2016–2017: Croatia
- 2017–2021: Brazil
- 2021: VL Pesaro
- 2022–2023: Croatia
- 2024–present: Brazil

Career highlights
- As player: 2× EuroLeague champion (1985, 1986); 2× FIBA European Cup Winners Cup champion (1982, 1987); 3× Yugoslav League champion (1982, 1984, 1985); 6× Yugoslav Cup winner (1980–1983, 1985, 1986); As head coach: EuroCup Coach of the Year (2011); 6× Croatian League champion (1992–1995, 1998, 2008); Croatian Cup winner (1995); Bosnian Coach of the Year (2012)
Medals
Men's basketball
Representing Yugoslavia
Summer Olympics
Bronze medal – third place	1984 Los Angeles
FIBA World Cup
Bronze medal – third place	1982 Colombia
Bronze medal – third place	1986 Spain
EuroBasket
Bronze medal – third place	1987 Greece
Universiade
Gold medal – first place	1987 Zagreb
Silver medal – second place	1979 Mexico City
Bronze medal – third place	1981 Bucharest
European Championship for Juniors
Gold medal – first place	1976 Spain
European Championship for Cadets
Bronze medal – third place	1975 Greece
Head coach for Croatia
EuroBasket
Bronze medal – third place	1995 Greece
Head coach for Brazil
FIBA AmeriCup
Gold medal – first place	2025 Nicaragua

Aleksandar "Aco" Petrović (pronounced [aleksǎːndar at͡so pětroʋitɕ]; born 16 February 1959) is a Croatian professional basketball coach and former player who is currently the head coach for the Brazil men's national team.

== Playing career ==
A point guard and shooting guard, Petrović achieved prominence in the 1980s and early 1990s. The pro clubs he played for included Šibenka, Cibona, Scavolini Pesaro, Novi Zagreb, and Racing Luxembourg. He was among the 105 player nominated for the 50 Greatest EuroLeague Contributors list.

== Coaching career ==
Petrović with Cedevita in 2011

Petrović started his club head coaching career with Cibona in 1991. Between 1995 and 1997, he coached the Spanish ACB League club Caja San Fernando, before returning to Cibona for the 1997–98 season.

In the 2001–02 season, he went to Poland to coach Anwil Włocławek. In 2004, he worked as head coach in Spain again, that time at Caprabo Lleida. In 2006, he took over the Italian Serie A club Carifac Fabriano, before switching to Eurorida Scafati. In the 2007–08 season, he took over the Croatian League club Zadar. He then became the head coach for Cedevita. He was named the EuroCup Coach of the Year in 2011.

Following the departure of Božidar Maljković, Petrović once again took charge over Cedevita on 26 November 2012. After Cedevita was eliminated from the EuroLeague and national cup, and left without any chance of qualifying for the ABA League final four, Petrović offered his resignation to the club, which was accepted on 3 March 2013.

On 16 December 2013, Petrović was named the head coach for the Lithuanian club Lietuvos rytas. Following a 91–92 national cup final game loss to Prienai, he was sacked on 31 March 2014.

On 16 July 2021, Petrović was named the head coach for Victoria Libertas Pesaro of the Italian Serie A.

== National team coaching ==
He coached the senior men's Croatia national team at EuroBasket 1995, when they finished in third, and at EuroBasket 2001, when Croatia was eliminated in the quarter-finals by Turkey.

In February 2012, Petrović was appointed the head coach for the senior men's Bosnia and Herzegovina national team, coaching them at EuroBasket in Slovenia the next year. In November 2013, the Basketball Federation of Bosnia and Herzegovina (KSBiH) sacked him.

On 23 March 2016, Petrović was named the head coach for the senior men's Croatia national team for the third time in his coaching career. In August the same year, Croatia managed to qualify for the Summer Olympics surprisingly winning qualifying tournament in Turin. At the Olympics, Croatia lost the quarterfinal game of the tournament from Serbia. On 15 September 2017, following a defeat to host Russia in the round of 16 at EuroBasket, Petrović resigned from Croatia bench.

In October 2017, a month after leaving Croatia, Petrović was named the head coach for the Brazil national team, which he led at the 2019 World Cup in China, but failed to qualify for the Summer Olympics the next year through the qualifying tournament in Split.

On 24 October 2022, Petrović was named the interim head coach for the Croatia men's national team, taking over Croatia for the fourth time in his coaching career.

In April 2024, he returned to Brazil bench for the second time.

== Personal life ==
Aleksandar Petrović was born in Šibenik as the first child of mother, Biserka (née Mikulandra), and father, Jovan "Jole" Petrović. His father, of Serb ethnicity, was born in Trebinje, which is today a part of Bosnia and Herzegovina, while his mother, of Croat ethnicity, was born in the village of Bilice, a municipality based a few kilometres west from Aleksandar's hometown of Šibenik, Croatia. His late younger brother, Dražen, was also a professional basketball player.

Petrović's cousin is the Serbian former basketball player and current executive, Dejan Bodiroga; Aleksandar's paternal grandfather Jovan and Dejan's paternal grandmother Gospava were siblings. Petrović's wife is Jadranka, whom he married in 1985. The couple have two children: a daughter, Lina, and son, Marko, who is also a basketball player.

Aleksandar's father, Jovan, died in April 2021 after a long illness.

During his playing career, Petrović got his nickname "Aco Trica" (trica is Croatian word for three-point field goal).

== See also ==
- 50 Greatest EuroLeague Contributors (2008)
