= 1981–82 Yugoslav First Basketball League =

Yugoslav basketball season

Yugoslav First Basketball League
- Season: 1981–82
- Games played: 132
- Teams: 12

Regular season
- Top seed: Partizan
- Promoted: Jugoplastika; Kvarner
- Relegated: Sloboda Tuzla; Rabotnički

Finals
- Champions: Cibona (1st title)
- Runners-up: Partizan
- Semifinalists: Zadar; Crvena zvezda

Statistical leaders
| Points | (Socialist Federal Republic of Yugoslavia) Dražen Dalipagić | 31.5 |
- All statistics correct as of 27 April 2017.

The 1981–82 Yugoslav First Basketball League season was the 38th season of the Yugoslav First Basketball League, the highest professional basketball league in SFR Yugoslavia. The season ended with Cibona winning the league championship by beating Partizan two games to none in the playoffs final best-of-three series.

The season was another milestone for club basketball in Yugoslavia as the sport began to be played with playoffs at the end of the regular league season, meaning that postseason would determine the league champion rather than regular season as was the case prior to the 1981–82 campaign.

KK Partizan finished the regular season on top with an 18–4 record just ahead of Cibona's 17–5; additionally, Partizan won both regular season games against Cibona. The same two teams made the playoff finals, having the home court advantage at every stage of the playoffs. Heading into the final series, Partizan had the home court advantage, but lost it after game 1 at Belgrade's Hala sportova in front of a packed crowd of 4,000—a hard-fought contest that visiting Cibona won 108–112 after triple overtime. Game 2 was played in Zagreb on Cibona's home court and Cibona won it assuredly to claim its first-ever Yugoslav title.

== Notable events ==
=== Introduction of playoffs ===
The season saw the playoffs introduced as a way of determining the Yugoslav First Federal Basketball League champion at the end of the regular season. The decision came on the heels of great debate within the country's basketball federation, KSJ, and Yugoslav coaching circles, and was initially somewhat controversial with many considering it jarring and/or unfair that an eight-placed team or even a Second League team could potentially become the season's champion through playoffs.

As for the European spots for FIBA Europe's competitions, the playoffs champion automatically qualified for a spot in the top-tier FIBA European Champions Cup while the Yugoslav Cup winner got a second-tier FIBA European Cup Winners' Cup spot. If the league and cup were won by the same team, the FIBA European Cup Winners' Cup went to the cup finalist. For the third-tier FIBA Korać Cup spots, the top four placed teams at the end of the regular season (excluding the champion and cup winner) received FIBA Korać Cup spots, meaning that qualification for the FIBA Korać Cup was still determined via the regular season and not the playoffs.

=== Praja Dalipagić back in Partizan, Moka Slavnić in Partizan jersey ===
The 1981–82 season featured the unusual sight of thirty-two-year-old Red Star Belgrade legendary point guard Moka Slavnić suiting up for their bitter crosstown rivals Partizan. Ever since leaving Red Star in acrimony four years earlier, Slavnić had been on such bad terms with the club's management that when he decided to return to his hometown in the twilight of his playing career, he controversially joined heated rivals Partizan instead of the club he made his name with and achieved legendary status in.

Due to administrative issues with his player registration, Slavnić's Partizan debut took place in week 7 versus Budućnost. He immediately proved valuable, assisting and organizing on offense on a roster that also featured another legendary veteran—thirty-year-old Dražen Dalipagić, himself returning to Belgrade following a season abroad with Reyer Venezia. In the first six games of the season that Partizan played without Slavnić, the team had a 3–3 record while with Slavnić they recorded only one loss in the next 16 league games until the end of the regular season, grabbing top spot ahead of the playoffs with an 18–4 record.

== Teams ==
(Socialist Republic of Serbia) SR Serbia

- Borac Čačak
- Crvena Zvezda
- Partizan
- Radnički Belgrade

(Socialist Republic of Croatia) SR Croatia

- Cibona
- Šibenka
- Zadar

(Socialist Republic of Bosnia and Herzegovina) SR Bosnia and Herzegovina

- Bosna
- Sloboda Dita Tuzla

(Socialist Republic of Macedonia) SR Macedonia

- Rabotnički

(Socialist Republic of Montenegro) SR Montenegro

- Budućnost

(Socialist Republic of Slovenia) SR Slovenia

- Iskra Olimpija

== Regular season ==
=== League table ===
| Pos | Teams | Pld | W | L | PF | PA | Pts | Playoffs or relegation |
|---|---|---|---|---|---|---|---|---|
| 1. | Partizan | 22 | 18 | 4 | 2150 | 1976 | 36 | Advance to Playoffs quarterfinal |
| 2. | Cibona | 22 | 17 | 5 | 2086 | 1906 | 34 | Advance to Playoffs quarterfinal |
| 3. | Crvena Zvezda | 22 | 13 | 9 | 2148 | 2051 | 26 | Advance to Playoffs quarterfinal |
| 4. | Zadar | 22 | 12 | 10 | 2162 | 2092 | 24 | Advance to Playoffs quarterfinal |
| 5. | Šibenka | 22 | 11 | 11 | 1967 | 1987 | 22 | Advance to Playoffs quarterfinal |
| 6. | Iskra Olimpija | 22 | 10 | 12 | 1947 | 2022 | 20 | Advance to Playoffs quarterfinal |
| 7. | Bosna | 22 | 10 | 12 | 2162 | 2170 | 20 | Advance to single-game Play-in |
| 8. | Budućnost | 22 | 10 | 12 | 1941 | 1942 | 20 | Advance to single-game Play-in |
| 9. | Radnički LMK Belgrade | 22 | 9 | 13 | 2017 | 2080 | 18 | Relegation playoffs |
| 10. | Borac Čačak | 22 | 9 | 13 | 2035 | 2044 | 18 | Relegation playoffs |
| 11. | Sloboda Dita Tuzla | 22 | 9 | 13 | 1858 | 1962 | 18 | Relegation playoffs |
| 12. | Rabotnički | 22 | 4 | 18 | 1934 | 2175 | 8 | Relegated |

== Results ==
| Home \ Away | PAR | CIB | CZV | ZAD | ŠIB | OLI | BOS | BUD | RAD | BOR | SLT | RAB |
|---|---|---|---|---|---|---|---|---|---|---|---|---|
| Partizan | — | 91–88 | 102–86 | 91–94 | 83–85 | 124–93 | 119–96 | 90–70 | 104–86 | 99–90 | 98–96 | 101–90 |
| Cibona | 79–85 | — | 102–101 | 91–90 | 98–83 | 101–87 | 110–89 | 101–89 | 95–81 | 91–92 | 103–88 | 128–120 |
| Crvena Zvezda | 85–92 | 92–82 | — | 115–102 | 96–104 | 96–95 | 119–105 | 98–82 | 87–94 | 116–93 | 112–86 | 108–98 |
| Zadar | 92–97 | 80–86 | 94–102 | — | 98–92 | 118–100 | 110–113 | 92–83 | 104–101 | 99–89 | 118–93 | 131–95 |
| Šibenka | 93–104 | 87–88 | 87–91 | 83–78 | — | 93–85 | 104–117 | 84–79 | 94–104 | 87–86 | 89–69 | 85–78 |
| Olimpija | 98–97 | 83–98 | 88–86 | 85–84 | 72–77 | — | 109–90 | 100–84 | 96–87 | 86–84 | 94–90 | 88–85 |
| Bosna | 100–91 | 87–89 | 94–98 | 120–97 | 91–87 | 95–84 | — | 92–82 | 112–100 | 93–95 | 89–90 | 104–83 |
| Budućnost | 88–90 | 95–90 | 106–84 | 88–98 | 105–86 | 99–80 | 110–106 | — | 95–79 | 83–78 | 84–63 | 91–84 |
| Radnički Belgrade | 109–110 | 88–90 | 84–105 | 93–104 | 94–86 | 74–73 | 97–91 | 92–85 | — | 120–116 | 93–85 | 104–88 |
| Borac Čačak | 88–94 | 86–97 | 92–88 | 90–93 | 91–94 | 99–87 | 103–99 | 90–78 | 86–84 | — | 95–88 | 121–94 |
| Sloboda Dita Tuzla | 91–98 | 65–77 | 85–84 | 93–91 | 90–78 | 72–79 | 93–87 | 80–79 | 80–76 | 87–76 | — | 92–70 |
| Rabotnički | 79–90 | 76–102 | 84–99 | 92–95 | 90–110 | 90–85 | 100–101 | 85–86 | 85–79 | 96–95 | 92–82 | — |

Source: Pearlbasket
Legend: Blue = home team win; Red = away team win.
Matches with lighter background shading were decided after overtime.

Other source:

== Playoff ==
The first ever Yugoslav First League playoffs were played in the following format:

- the top six regular season teams clinched an automatic playoff quarterfinals spot while
- the 7th and 8th placed teams went to a play-in game against the Yugoslav Second League 2nd and 1st placed teams, respectively—with the winners of these two games (played at a neutral venue) clinching a playoff quarterfinals spot.

The top two teams from the 1981–82 Yugoslav Second League were KK Jugoplastika from Split and KK Kvarner from Rijeka. They thus faced Yugoslav First League clubs—8th placed KK Budućnost from Titograd and 7th placed KK Bosna from Sarajevo, respectively—with the winner of each game clinching a playoff spot.

Single game play-in qualifying
8 | Budućnost | 72
B1 | Jugoplastika | 94
7 | Bosna | 110
B2 | Kvarner | 93

Quarterfinals
1 | Partizan | 100 | 81 | 104
B1 | Jugoplastika | 90 | 86 | 91
4 | Zadar | 110 | 119 | 94
5 | Šibenka | 93 | 123 | 85
2 | Cibona | 103 | 82
7 | Bosna | 90 | 72
3 | Crvena Zvezda | 91 | 107
6 | Olimpija | 85 | 86

Semifinals
1 | Partizan | 103 | 81 | 95
4 | Zadar | 95 | 88 | 73
2 | Cibona | 94 | 90 | 97
3 | Crvena Zvezda | 92 | 100 | 90

Finals
1 | Partizan | 108 | 75
2 | Cibona | 112 | 89

SINGLE GAME PLAY-IN QUALIFYING

Budućnost-Jugoplastika 72-94

Bosna Sarajevo-Kvarner 110-93

QUARTERFINALS

Partizan-Jugoplastika 100-90, 81-86, 104-91

Cibona-Bosna 103-90, 72-82

Crvena zvezda-Olimpija 91-85, 107-86

Zadar-Šibenka 110-93, 119-123, 94-85

SEMIFINALS

Partizan-Zadar 103-95, 81-88, 95-73

Cibona-Crvena zvezda 94-92, 90-100, 97-90

FINALS

Partizan-Cibona 108-112 (3OT), 75-89

== Winning roster ==
The winning roster of Cibona:

- (Socialist Federal Republic of Yugoslavia) Damir Pavličević
- (Socialist Federal Republic of Yugoslavia) Aco Petrović
- (Socialist Federal Republic of Yugoslavia) Mihovil Nakić
- (Socialist Federal Republic of Yugoslavia) Andro Knego
- (Socialist Federal Republic of Yugoslavia) Krešimir Ćosić
- (Socialist Federal Republic of Yugoslavia) Zoran Čutura
- (Socialist Federal Republic of Yugoslavia) Rajko Gospodnetić
- (Socialist Federal Republic of Yugoslavia) Adnan Bečić
- (Socialist Federal Republic of Yugoslavia) Tomislav Bevanda
- (Socialist Federal Republic of Yugoslavia) Mladen Cetinja
- (Socialist Federal Republic of Yugoslavia) Sven Ušić
- (Socialist Federal Republic of Yugoslavia) Srđan Savović

Coach: (Socialist Federal Republic of Yugoslavia) Mirko Novosel

== Relegation playoffs ==
Since teams from 9th to 11th place ended up with the same number of points, it was decided that a relegation tournament would be held at neutral venue in Kumanovo.

Sloboda Dita had finished last and was therefore relegated.

| | Teams | W | L | PF | PA | Status |
|---|---|---|---|---|---|---|
| 1 | Radnički LMK Belgrade | 2 | 0 | 174 | 166 | |
| 2 | Borac Čačak | 1 | 1 | 184 | 180 | |
| 3 | Sloboda Dita Tuzla | 0 | 2 | 171 | 183 | Relegated |

== Qualification in 1982–83 season European competitions ==
FIBA European Champions Cup

- Cibona (champions)

FIBA Cup Winner's Cup

- Iskra Olimpija (Cup finalist)

FIBA Korać Cup

- Partizan (1st)
- Crvena Zvezda (3rd)
- Zadar (4th)
- Šibenka (5th)

== Basketball Cup ==
=== Bracket ===
Eightfinals
Borac Čačak | 78
Iskra Olimpija | 94
Željezničar Sarajevo | 73
Partizan | 76
Jugoplastika | 98
Crvena zvezda | 93
Zadar | 96
Bosna | 93
Vojvodina | 122
Slovan | 105
Cibona
Metalac Valjevo
Šibenka | 112
Ylli | 73
Budućnost | 91
Rabotnički | 83

Quarterfinals
Iskra Olimpija | 92
Partizan | 73
Jugoplastika | 84
Zadar | 82
Vojvodina | 88
Cibona | 105
Šibenka
Budućnost

Semifinals
Iskra Olimpija
Cibona

Finals
Iskra Olimpija | 79
Cibona | 90
