= 1986 FIBA European Champions Cup Final =

Cibona (Socialist Federal Republic of Yugoslavia)	(Soviet Union) Žalgiris
94	82
- Date: 3 April 1986
- Venue: Sportcsarnok, Budapest, Hungary
- Referees: Kostas Rigas, Vittorio Fiorito
- Attendance: 12,500

The 1986 FIBA European Champions Cup Final was the championship match of the International Basketball Federation held in Budapest, Hungary on 3 April 1986. The Croatian team Cibona was victorious.

== Match details ==
3 April 1986
19:00

Report

Cibona (Socialist Federal Republic of Yugoslavia)	94–82	(Soviet Union) Žalgiris
Scoring by quarter: 47–39, 47–43
Pts: Cvjetićanin 24; Rebs: Nakić 6 Asts: Petrović 5		Pts: Sabonis 27; Rebs: Sabonis 14; Asts: Chomičius 3

Sportcsarnok, Budapest
Attendance: 12,500
Referees: Kostas Rigas (GRE), Vittorio Fiorito (ITA)

1985–86 FIBA European Champions Cup
Champions

Cibona
2nd Title

== Awards ==
=== FIBA European Champions Cup Finals Top Scorer ===
- (Soviet Union) Arvydas Sabonis ( (Soviet Union) Žalgiris)
