= Mihovil Nakić =

Croatian basketball player

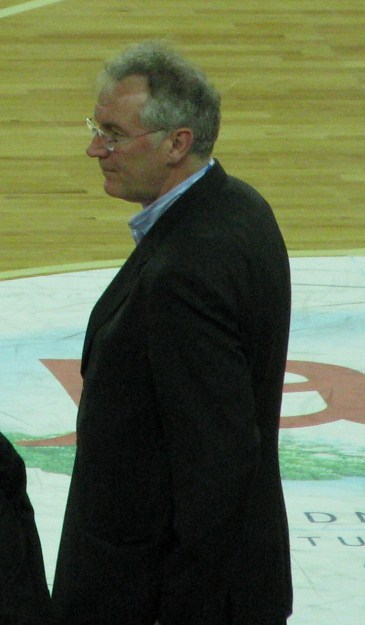
- Nakić, in 2010.

Personal information
- Born: 31 July 1955 (age 71) Drniš, PR Croatia, FPR Yugoslavia
- Listed height: 2.04 m (6 ft 8 1/2 in)
- Listed weight: 210 lb (95 kg)

Career information
- Playing career: 1973–1989
- Position: Small forward
- Number: 4

Career history

Playing
- 1973–1976: Industromontaža
- 1977–1987: Cibona
- 1987–1988: Pallalcesto Amatori Udine
- 1988–1989: Cibona

Coaching
- 1997–1998: Cibona

Career highlights
- As player: 2× EuroLeague champion (1985, 1986); 2× FIBA Saporta Cup champion (1982, 1987); 3× Yugoslav League champion (1982, 1984, 1985); 2× Yugoslav Cup winner (1985, 1986); No. 4 retired by Cibona Zagreb
Medals
Representing Yugoslavia
Men's basketball
Olympic Games
Gold medal – first place	1980 Moscow
Bronze medal – third place	1984 Los Angeles
FIBA EuroBasket
Bronze medal – third place	1979 Italy
Universiade
Silver medal – second place	1979 Mexico City
European Championship for Juniors
Gold medal – first place	1974 France	Under-18

Mihovil Nakić-Vojnović (born 31 July 1955) is a Croatian former professional basketball player. Standing at 2.04 m (6 ft 8 1/2 in), he played as a small forward.

== Club career ==
Nakić spent most of his club career in Cibona, which he helped win back-to-back EuroLeague titles in 1985 and 1986, as well as the Saporta Cup in 1987, always supporting his great teammate, Dražen Petrović. He also won the 1982 Saporta Cup with Cibona. He was nominated for the EuroLeague's 50 Greatest Contributors list in 2008.

== National team career ==
With the senior Yugoslav national basketball team, Nakić won the gold medal at the 1980 Summer Olympic Games, and the bronze medal at the 1984 Summer Olympic games. He also was a part of the Yugoslavian national team that won the bronze medal at the 1979 EuroBasket.

== Post-playing career ==
After his playing career, Nakić served as Cibona's sports director.
