= Ušić =

Ušić is a name. Notable people with the name include:

- Sven Ušić (born 1959), Croatian basketball player
- Senna Ušić Jogunica (born 1986), Croatian volleyball player

== See also ==
- United States Intelligence Community
