= 1984–85 Yugoslav First Basketball League =

- League: Yugoslav First Basketball League
- Sport: Basketball

Regular season
- Season champions: (Socialist Republic of Croatia) Cibona

Playoffs
- Finals champions: (Socialist Republic of Croatia) Cibona
- Runners-up: Crvena Zvezda

Yugoslav First Basketball League seasons
- ← 1983–84 1985–86 →

The 1984–85 Yugoslav First Basketball League season was the 41st season of the Yugoslav First Basketball League, the highest professional basketball league in SFR Yugoslavia.

== Teams ==
(Socialist Republic of Serbia) SR Serbia

- Borac Čačak
- Crvena Zvezda
- IMT
- Partizan
- Radnički Belgrade
- Sloga

(Socialist Republic of Croatia) SR Croatia

- Cibona
- Jugoplastika
- Šibenka
- Zadar

(Socialist Republic of Bosnia and Herzegovina) SR Bosnia and Herzegovina

- Bosna

(Socialist Republic of Montenegro) SR Montenegro

- Budućnost

== Regular season ==
=== Classification ===
Pos	Teams	Pts	Pld	W	L	PF	PA	Playoffs or relegation
1.	Cibona	38	22	19	3	2078	1850	Advance to Playoffs quarterfinal
2.	Crvena Zvezda	28	22	14	8	2108	1940	Advance to Playoffs quarterfinal
3.	Zadar	28	22	14	8	1915	1820	Advance to Playoffs quarterfinal
4.	Bosna	28	22	14	8	2004	1945	Advance to Playoffs quarterfinal
5.	Partizan	26	22	13	9	2013	1932	Advance to Play-in round
6.	Šibenka	24	22	12	10	1978	1973	Advance to Play-in round
7.	Budućnost	20	22	10	12	1830	1860	Advance to Play-in round
8.	Borac Čačak	18	22	9	13	1901	2065	Advance to Play-in round
9.	Sloga	16	22	8	14	1916	2043	Advance to Play-in round
10.	Jugoplastika	16	22	8	14	1882	1917	Advance to Play-in round
11.	Radnički Belgrade	16	22	8	14	1895	1971	Relegated
12.	IMT	6	22	3	19	1756	1960	Relegated

== Results ==
Home \ Away	CIB	CZV	ZAD	BOS	PAR	ŠIB	BUD	BOR	SLO	JUG	RAD	IMT
Cibona	—	98–92	85–81	101–89	96–91	120–93	107–96	103–96	115–89	90–73	97–90	94–78
Crvena Zvezda	77–91	—	108–87	107–99	107–81	105–89	100–85	96–78	96–84	91–83	101–80	93–74
Zadar	83–80	83–79	—	85–72	80–77	103–92	89–76	87–69	101–92	92–81	99–88	97–84
Bosna	84–91	81–86	97–90	—	104–99	96–83	80–68	97–95	102–86	83–79	116–100	83–79
Partizan	78–77	111–110	74–67	96–97	—	105–84	95–86	82–85	94–68	94–88	117–93	109–91
Šibenka	83–82	93–87	85–88	81–86	92–93	—	90–77	109–92	100–89	92–81	88–80	100–82
Budućnost	69–87	79–88	99–98	85–83	98–90	76–89	—	113–78	92–89	77–61	84–85	82–72
Borac Čačak	73–89	86–85	85–84	103–93	72–70	107–104	75–79	—	101–95	102–101	93–112	78–84
Sloga	80–99	103–102	93–91	96–93	84–89	80–88	82–83	89–76	—	92–85	79–77	84–76
Jugoplastika	93–97	90–103	80–78	79–99	91–77	100–82	81–74	123–86	92–82	—	80–77	86–79
Radnički Belgrade	80–83	101–94	55–73	80–86	83–88	73–74	78–77	89–83	94–105	86–82	—	81–76
IMT	82–96	84–101	69–79	76–84	79–103	71–87	62–75	82–88	96–74	84–73	96–113	—

Source: Pearlbasket
Legend: Blue = home team win; Red = away team win.
Matches with lighter background shading were decided after overtime.

Other source:

== Playoff ==
Only the top four placed league table teams qualified for the playoffs quarterfinal automatically.

Teams placed fifth, sixth, seventh, eighth, ninth, and tenth were joined by the top two Second League teams for an 8-team play-in round. The winner of each best-of-three series advanced to the playoffs quarterfinal round.

E- IB League east division champion

W- IB League west division champion

Play-in qualifying round
8	Borac Čačak	116	83	118
9	Sloga	91	101	100
5	Partizan	110	95
E	Rabotnički	89	90
7	Budućnost	82	89	95
10	Jugoplastika	79	101	91
6	Šibenka	83	77
W	Smelt Olimpija	89	87

Quarter-finals
1	Cibona	107	108
8	Borac Čačak	87	85
4	Bosna	91	98	97
5	Partizan	84	111	98
2	Crvena zvezda	97	79	90
7	Budućnost	85	95	87
3	Zadar	111	82	100
-	Smelt Olimpija	86	89	97

Semi-finals
1	Cibona	115	79
5	Partizan	103	75
2	Crvena zvezda	97	90
3	Zadar	86	85

Final
1	Cibona	97	89	119
2	Crvena zvezda	88	92	106

PLAY-IN QUALIFYING ROUND

Borac Čačak-Sloga 116-91, 83-101, 118-100

Partizan-Rabotnički 110-89, 95-90

Budućnost-Jugoplastika 82-79, 89-101, 95-91

Šibenka-Olimpija 83-89, 77-87

QUARTERFINALS

Cibona-Borac Čačak 107-87, 108-85

Bosna-Partizan 91-84, 98-111, 97-98

Crvena zvezda-Budućnost 97-85, 79-95, 90-87

Zadar-Olimpija 111-86, 82-89, 100-97

SEMIFINALS

Cibona-Partizan 115-103, 79-75

Crvena zvezda-Zadar 97-86, 90-85

FINALS

Cibona-Crvena zvezda 97-88, 89-92, 119-106

The winning roster of Cibona:

- (Socialist Federal Republic of Yugoslavia) Dražen Petrović
- (Socialist Federal Republic of Yugoslavia) Mihovil Nakić
- (Socialist Federal Republic of Yugoslavia) Aleksandar Petrović
- (Socialist Federal Republic of Yugoslavia) Adnan Bečić
- (Socialist Federal Republic of Yugoslavia) Andro Knego
- (Socialist Federal Republic of Yugoslavia) Sven Ušić
- (Socialist Federal Republic of Yugoslavia) Zoran Čutura
- (Socialist Federal Republic of Yugoslavia) Franjo Arapović
- (Socialist Federal Republic of Yugoslavia) Ivo Nakić
- (Socialist Federal Republic of Yugoslavia) Branko Vukićević
- (Socialist Federal Republic of Yugoslavia) Igor Lukačić

Coach: (Socialist Federal Republic of Yugoslavia) Željko Pavličević

== Scoring leaders ==
1. Dražen Petrović (Cibona) – ___ points (32.0ppg)

== Qualification in 1985–86 season European competitions ==
FIBA European Champions Cup

- Cibona (champions)

FIBA Cup Winners' Cup

- Jugoplastika (Cup finalist)

FIBA Korać Cup

- Crvena Zvezda (2nd)
- Zadar (3rd)
- Bosna (4th)
- Partizan (5th)

== Basketball Cup ==
=== Bracket ===
Eightfinals
Cibona	96
Partizan	83
Sloboda Tuzla	72
Budućnost	64
Željezničar Sarajevo	71
Zadar	84
Šibenka
Vojvodina
Smelt Olimpija	105
OKK Beograd	83
Rabotnički	93
Crvena zvezda	85
Jugoplastika	76
TIMA Maribor	71
Prvi partizan	20
Priština	0

Quarterfinals
Cibona	130
Sloboda Tuzla	103
Zadar	91
Šibenka	83
Smelt Olimpija	78
Rabotnički	75
Jugoplastika	77
Prvi partizan	62

Semifinals
Cibona	94
Zadar	79
Olimpija	74
Jugoplastika	75

Finals
Cibona	104
Jugoplastika	83
