= Budapest Sportcsarnok =

Sports venue

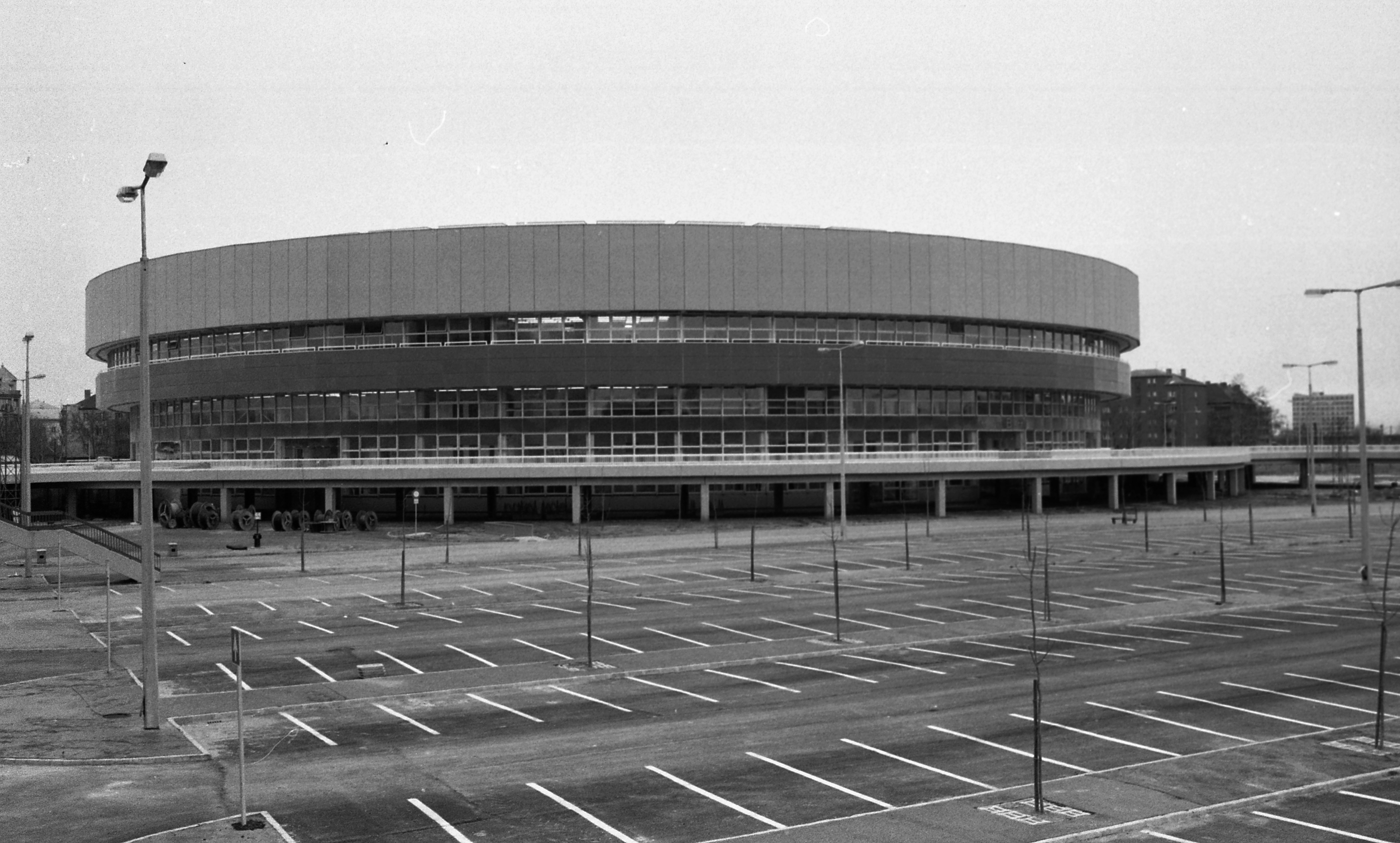
- Interactive map of Budapest Sportcsarnok
- Location: Budapest, Hungary
- Coordinates: 47°30′6.99″N 19°6′19.41″E
- Capacity: 12,500

Construction
- Groundbreaking: 1978
- Opened: 12 February 1982
- Demolished: 15 December 1999

Budapest Sportcsarnok was an indoor arena in Budapest, Hungary. The arena had a seating capacity for 12,500 spectators and opened in 1982. It was primarily used for basketball, figure skating, volleyball and other indoor sporting events until it burned down on 15 December 1999. It was replaced by the current László Papp Arena.

It hosted the 1983 European Athletics Indoor Championships, 1986 basketball European Champions cup final in which Cibona Zagreb defeated Žalgiris Kaunas 94–82., 1988 World Figure Skating Championships, 1988 European Athletics Indoor Championships and the 1989 IAAF World Indoor Championships.

Events and tenants
Preceded by Palazzo dello Sport; Milan	European Indoor Championships in Athletics; Venue; 1983	Succeeded by Scandinavium; Gothenburg
Preceded by Peace and Friendship Stadium; Athens	FIBA European Champions Cup; Final Venue; 1986	Succeeded by Patinoire de Malley; Lausanne
Preceded by Riverfront Coliseum; Cincinnati	World Figure Skating Championships; Venue; 1988	Succeeded by Palais Omnisports de Paris-Bercy; Paris
Preceded by Stade couvert régional Liévin	European Indoor Championships in Athletics; Venue; 1988	Succeeded by Houtrust; The Hague
Preceded by Hoosier Dome; Indianapolis	IAAF World Indoor Championships in Athletics; Venue; 1989	Succeeded by Palacio Municipal de Deportes San Pablo; Seville
