= Andro Knego =

Croatian basketball player

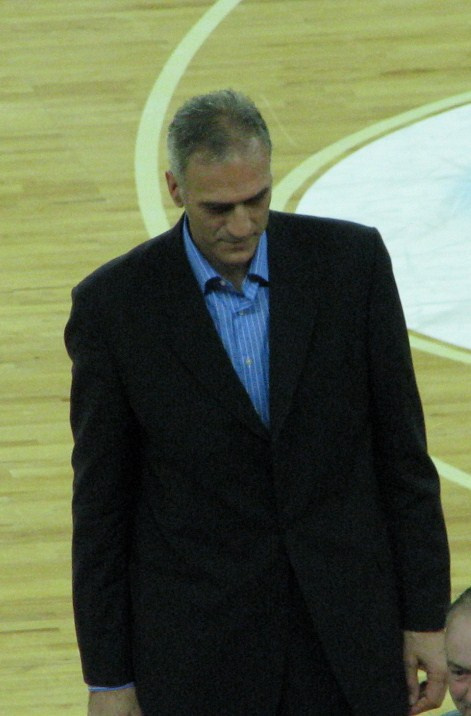
- Knego, in 2010.

Personal information
- Born: 21 October 1956 (age 70) Dubrovnik, PR Croatia, FPR Yugoslavia
- Listed height: 6 ft 9 in (2.06 m)
- Listed weight: 211 lb (96 kg)

Career information
- Playing career: 1977–1997
- Position: Center

Career history
- 1977–1985: Cibona Zagreb
- 1985–1986: Cajamadrid
- 1986–1987: Cibona Zagreb
- 1987–1990: Montecatini
- 1990–1992: Cibona Zagreb
- 1996–1997: WBC Wels

Career highlights
- EuroLeague champion (1985); 2× FIBA Saporta Cup champion (1982, 1987); 3× Yugoslav League champion (1982, 1984, 1985); 2× Yugoslav Cup winner (1985, 1986); Croatian League champion (1992); FIBA Saporta Cup Finals Top Scorer (1982); FIBA European Selection (1990); No. 11 retired by Cibona Zagreb
Medals
Men's basketball
Representing Yugoslavia
Summer Olympic Games
Gold medal – first place	1980 Moscow
Silver medal – second place	1976 Montreal
Bronze medal – third place	1984 Los Angeles
FIBA World Cup
Gold medal – first place	1978 Philippines
Bronze medal – third place	1982 Colombia
FIBA EuroBasket
Silver medal – second place	1981 Czechoslovakia
European Championship for Juniors
Gold medal – first place	1974 France	Under-18
European Championship for Cadets
Bronze medal – third place	1973 Italy	Under-16

Andrija "Andro" Knego (born 21 October 1956) is a Croatian former professional basketball player.

== Professional career ==
During his club career, Knego was the FIBA Saporta Cup Finals Top Scorer, in 1982.

== National team career ==
Knego played with the senior Yugoslavian national basketball team at the 1976 Summer Olympics, the 1980 Summer Olympics, and the 1984 Summer Olympics.
