= Slipčići =

- Village
- Location within Bosnia and Herzegovina
- Coordinates: 43°14′10″N 17°48′20″E
- Country: Bosnia and Herzegovina
- Entity: Federation of Bosnia and Herzegovina
- Canton: Herzegovina-Neretva
- Municipality: City of Mostar

Area
  - Total: 5.29 sq mi (13.69 km^{2})

Population (2013)
  - Total: 207
  - Density: 39.2/sq mi (15.1/km^{2})
- Time zone: UTC+1 (CET)
  - Summer (DST): UTC+2 (CEST)
- Postal code: 88000 (Same as Mostar)
- Area code: (+387) 36 345

Slipčići is a village in the City of Mostar, Bosnia and Herzegovina.

== Demographics ==
According to the 2013 census, its population was 207.

Ethnicity in 2013
Ethnicity	Number	Percentage
Croats	205	99.0%
other/undeclared	2	1.0%
Total	207	100%
