= Mirko Novosel =

Croatian basketball player and coach (1938–2023)

Cibona
- Position: Honorary president
- League: HT Premijer liga ABA League

Personal information
- Born: 30 June 1938 Zagreb, Kingdom of Yugoslavia
- Died: 20 July 2023 (aged 85)

Career information
- Playing career: 1952–1966
- Coaching career: 1967–1993

Career history

Playing
- 1952–1966: Lokomotiva

Coaching
- 1967–1971, 1976-1985, 1986-1988: Lokomotiva/Cibona Zagreb
- 1988–1990: Napoli

Career highlights
- As head coach: 2× EuroLeague champion (1985, 1986); European Coach of the Year (1985); 2× FIBA European Selection (1995); 2× FIBA Saporta Cup champion (1982, 1987); 2× Yugoslav League champion (1982, 1984); 7× Yugoslav Cup winner (1969, 1980–1983, 1985, 1988)
- Basketball Hall of Fame
- FIBA Hall of Fame
Medals
Men's basketball
Head Coach for Yugoslavia
Olympic Games
Silver medal – second place	1976 Montreal
Bronze medal – third place	1984 Los Angeles
FIBA World Cup
Silver medal – second place	1974 Puerto Rico
EuroBasket
Gold medal – first place	1973 Spain
Gold medal – first place	1975 Yugoslavia
Head Coach for Croatia
Bronze medal – third place	1993 Germany

Mirko Novosel (30 June 1938 – 20 July 2023) was a Croatian professional basketball coach and player.

== Playing career ==
Novosel played club basketball, from 1952 to 1966, with Lokomotiva Zagreb (later changed to KK Cibona Zagreb).

== Coaching career ==
Novosel coached Cibona Zagreb to two Yugoslav League titles, seven Yugoslav Cups, and the two European Champions Cup titles in 1985 and 1986, when he was named the European Coach of the Year.

== National team coaching career ==
As the head coach, Novosel led the senior men's Yugoslav national team to the gold medals at the 1973 FIBA European Championship and the 1975 FIBA European Championship, the silver medal at the 1974 FIBA World Championship, the silver medal at the 1976 Montreal Summer Olympics, and the bronze medal at the 1984 Los Angeles Summer Olympics.

Novosel was also the head coach of the senior men's Croatia national team, leading them to the bronze medal at the 1993 European Championship.

He was enshrined into the Naismith Memorial Basketball Hall of Fame, as a coach, on 7 September 2007. He was inducted into the FIBA Hall of Fame, as a coach, in 2010.

== Death ==
Mirko Novosel died on 20 July 2023, at the age of 85.

== Career achievements ==
=== Club career ===
- FIBA European Champions Cup: 1 (with Cibona: 1984–85)
- FIBA European Cup Winners' Cup (Saporta Cup): 2 (with Cibona: 1981–82, 1986–87)
- FIBA European Champions Cup – top 6 (with Cibona: 1982–83)
- FIBA Korać Cup – finalist (with Cibona: 1979–80, 1987–88)
- Yugoslav League: 2 (with Cibona: 1981–82, 1983–84)
- Yugoslav Cup: 7 (with Cibona: 1968–69 (under the name Lokomotiva), 1979–80, 1980–81, 1981–82, 1982–83, 1984–85, 1987–88)

== See also ==
- List of FIBA EuroBasket winning head coaches
- List of EuroLeague-winning head coaches
