= Sven Ušić =

Croatian basketball player and coach

Personal information
- Born: 19 July 1959 (age 67) Pula, PR Croatia, FPR Yugoslavia
- Listed height: 6 ft 7 in (2.01 m)
- Listed weight: 210 lb (95 kg)

Career information
- NBA draft: 1981: undrafted
- Playing career: 1972–1995
- Position: Small forward / power forward
- Number: 13
- Coaching career: 1995–2019

Career history

Playing
- 1973–1980: Gradine Pula
- 1976–1990: Cibona
- 1990–1993: Zadar
- 1993–1995: Gradine Pula

Coaching
- 2000–2003: Omiš
- 2003–2004: Alkar
- 2004–2005: Podravac Virje
- 2005–2009: Jazine Arbanasi
- 2009–2012: Dubrava
- 2012–2013: Omiš
- 2013–2015: Trogir
- 2016–2019: Cibona (junior)

Career highlights
- As player: 3× Yugoslav League champion (1982, 1984, 1985); 6× Yugoslav Cup champion (1980–1983, 1985, 1986, 1988); 2× EuroLeague champion (1985, 1986); 2× FIBA Saporta Cup champion (1982, 1987)

Sven Ušić (born 19 August 1959) is a former Croatian professional basketball player and coach. At a height of 2.01 m (6 ft 7 in) tall, he played as a small forward.

== Career ==
Ušić started his career in his native Pula, playing for KK Gradine Pula. He moved to Cibona in 1976, and initially found tough competition in the club. One night, at the beginning of his time at Cibona, Ušić was locked in the locker room by mistake before the game. Ušić started warming up for the game between the locker room's benches, and somebody soon came back for him. He entered the game and played well, shooting 12 times and hitting every time. After the game, coach Mirko Novosel jokingly told him that he would lock him up before every game.

Ušić has stated that he was helped a lot by Mirko Novosel, who noticed him and brought him to Zagreb.

In the 1979/80 season, Cibona reached the final of the FIBA Korać Cup, which they lost to AMG from Rieti. In the 1980/81 season they won the Yugoslav Cup. His Cibona played in the Cup Winners' Cup in 1981/82, which they won with a victory against Real Madrid in the final. They won the championship and cup of Yugoslavia both in the 1983/84 and 1984/85 seasons. He also won the European Champions Cup for two years in a row, 1985 and 1986. In the 1985/86 season Cibona convincingly won 1st place in the league, before the playoffs and the Yugoslav Cup. But they lost to Zadar in the end. Therefore, in the 1986/87 season, Cibona competed in the Cup Winners' Cup, which they won, beating Scavolini Pesaro in the final. In the same season, something similar happened in the championship and the cup: Cibona convincingly won the 1st place in the league, but in the playoffs they were surprised by the Serbian club Crvena Zvezda. Therefore, in the 1987/88 season they competed in the FIBA Korać Cup, losing to the Spanish club Real Madrid in the final.

== National team career ==
Ušić played for Yugoslavia at the European Championship in 1985, which the favored Yugoslavia, after two surprising defeats (CSSR, FR Germany), finished only 7th. He played 8 games in the competition, for a total of 1 minute and 1.8 points.

== Personal life ==
=== Marriage ===
During mid-1980s, Ušić married the professional volleyball player Snježana Azenić whose father Antun Azenić had founded ŽOK Azena, Velika Gorica-based women's volleyball club, which Snježana had played for and would later coach. The couple's first child, daughter Senna, was born in 1986. The couple had three more daughters, Simona, Marija, and Ana, and a son, David.

=== Children ===
Ušić's oldest daughter Senna Ušić became a professional volleyball player.

Ušić's other three daughters, Simona, Marija, and Ana, also pursued volleyball professionally. His son David played basketball, getting as far as Division II U.S. college basketball at Florida Tech.

=== Song incident ===
In January 2006, Ušić, a ŽOK Azena management board member, was accused of playing the Ustaša song "Jasenovac i Gradiška Stara" by Croatian singer Thompson over the arena's public address system during a game between ŽOK Azena and the Slovenian club HIT Nova Gorica. Ušić reportedly decided to play the controversial song celebrating World War II massacres and genocide on three separate occasions during the game's time outs. According to the arena manager, the former Cibona basketball player Ušić interfered by approaching the music console despite being repeatedly told to move away from the CD player.
