= Branko Vukićević =

Serbian former basketball player (born 1961)

Personal information
- Born: December 18, 1961 (age 64) Belgrade, PR Serbia, FPR Yugoslavia
- Listed height: 2.12 m (6 ft 11 in)
- Listed weight: 100 kg (220 lb)

Career information
- NBA draft: 1983: undrafted
- Playing career: 1979–1994
- Position: Center
- Number: 12, 13

Career history
- 1979–1982: OKK Beograd
- 1983–1989: Cibona
- 1989–1991: Novi Zagreb
- 1991–1993: NAP Novi Sad
- 1993–1994: Pezinok

Career highlights
- 2× EuroLeague champion (1985, 1986); FIBA Saporta Cup champion (1987); 2× Yugoslav League champion (1984, 1985); 3× Yugoslav Cup winner (1985, 1986, 1988)
Medals
Men's basketball
Representing Yugoslavia
Olympic Games
Bronze medal – third place	1984 Los Angeles	Team competition
Mediterranean Games
Gold medal – first place	1983 Morocco	Team
European Championship for Juniors
Silver medal – second place	1980 Yugoslavia	Team

Branko Vukićević (born 18 December 1961) is a Serbian former basketball player who competed for Yugoslavia in the 1984 Summer Olympics.

Vukićević played for Cibona Zagreb until June 1991, when he left for Belgrade after a dispute with the club management. He later received a sports pension from Serbia.
