= KK Cibona =

Basketball club in Zagreb, Croatia

Cibona
- Nickname: Vukovi (The Wolves)
- Leagues: Croatian League; ABA League; Champions League
- Founded: 24 April 1946; 80 years ago
- Arena: Dražen Petrović Basketball Hall
- Capacity: 5,400
- Location: Zagreb, Croatia
- Team colors: Blue and white
- President: Brian Lu
- General manager: Tomislav Šerić
- Head coach: Ivan Tomas
- Team captain: Krešimir Radovčić
- Championships: 2 EuroLeague; 2 Saporta Cup; 1 FIBA Korać Cup; 1 Adriatic League; 21 Croatian League; 9 Croatian Cups; 3 Yugoslav League; 8 Yugoslav Cups
- Retired numbers: 4 (4, 10, 11, 20)
- Website: www.cibona.com
Home	Away

Košarkaški klub Cibona, commonly referred to as Cibona Zagreb or simply Cibona, is a men's professional basketball club based in Zagreb, Croatia. The club is a founding member and shareholder of the Adriatic Basketball Association, and competes in the Croatian League, the ABA League, and the FIBA Champions League.

== History ==
=== Formation and early years ===
Cibona's history dates to late autumn of 1945 when Sloboda (Freedom) was founded as a sports society of bank workers, craftsmen, traders, and clerks. On April 24, 1946, thanks to basketball enthusiast Branimir Volfer and his friends Ljubo Prosen and Joso Miloš, basketball section of Sloboda, the predecessor of today's Cibona, was formed. Its first game was against local rival Slavija on May 7, 1946. Sloboda did not last too long under that name as in November 1946, it merged with Tekstilac, Amater and Grafičar into Sportsko društvo Zagreb (Sports Society Zagreb). Name changing continued through the next four years. In late 1948 it was known as Vihor (Vortex) and already in 1949 as Polet (Elan). Finally, in June 1950, the club changed the name to Lokomotiva (Locomotive) and that name is going to stick for the next 25 years. Lokomotiva competed in Yugoslav top division since 1951, with only two years (1952 and 1960) spent in the second division.

Apollo Hall in Amsterdam between AMVJ and Lokomotiva from Yugoslavia (37-64) in 1955

Name through history
- SD Sloboda (April 1946 – November 1946)
- SD Zagreb (November 1946 – December 1948)
- KK Vihor (December 1948 – February 1949)
- KK Polet (February 1949 – June 1950)
- KK Lokomotiva (1950–1975)
- KK Cibona (1975–present)

=== First trophies ===
Lokomotiva's first major trophy came in 1969, when they won the Yugoslav Cup, led by legendary Hall of Famer Mirko Novosel. The final game against AŠK Olimpija was played in Lokomotiva's new basketball hall "Kutija šibica" (literally meaning Matchbox). Led by phenomenal trio Većeslav Kavedžija, Nikola Plećaš and Milivoj Omašić, Lokomotiva won the game 78:77.

Their first European trophy came in 1972 when Lokomotiva won the premier edition of FIBA Korać Cup. Their opponent in finals was OKK Beograd and the first game was played in Belgrade. OKK Beograd won the first game 83:71 but in a return match Lokomotiva, led by great Nikola Plećaš (nicknamed Sveti Nikola) who scored 40 points, trashed the Belgrade side by 94–73.

=== Cibona's glory years ===
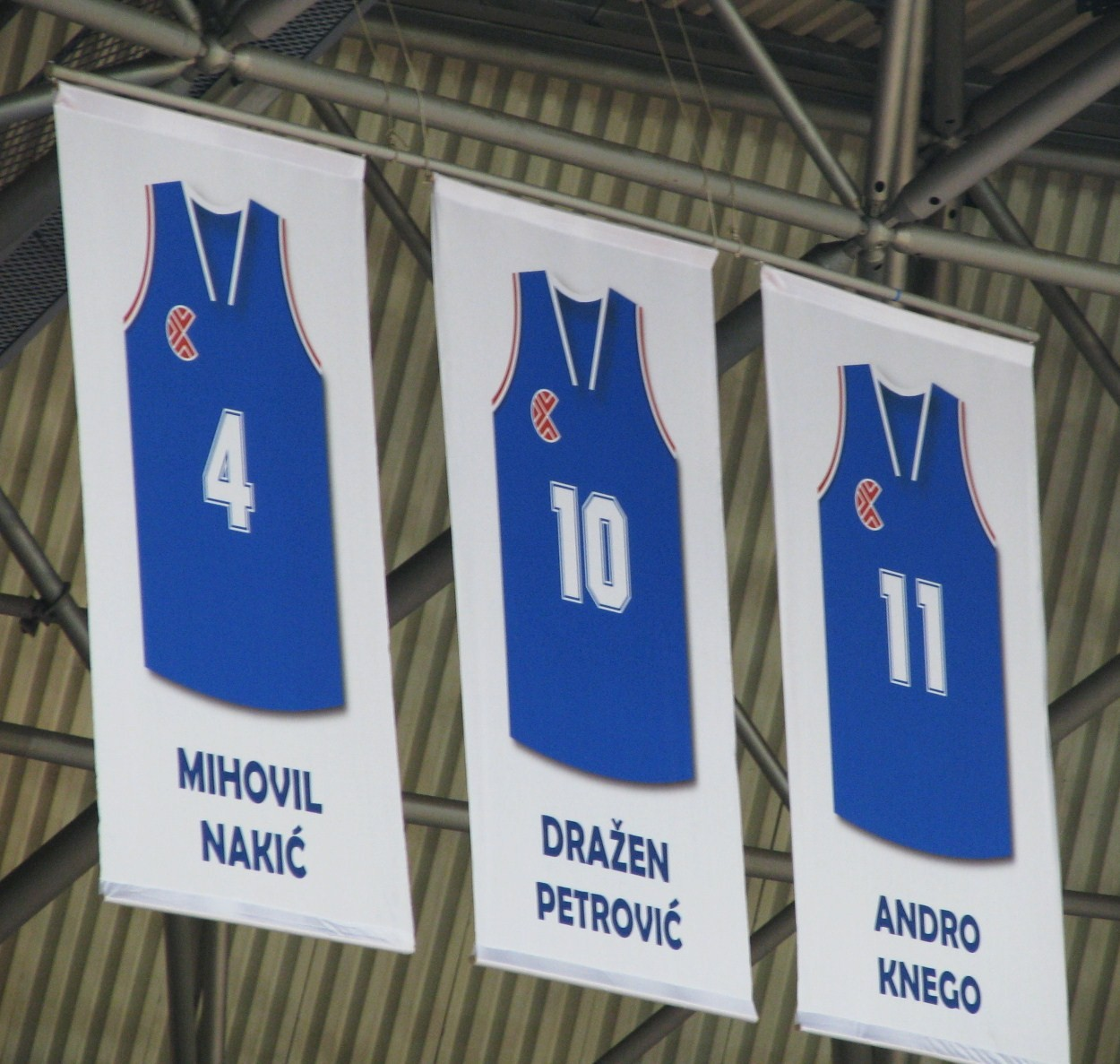
Nakić, D. Petrović & Knego's jerseys hanging in the rafters of the Dražen Petrović Basketball Hall

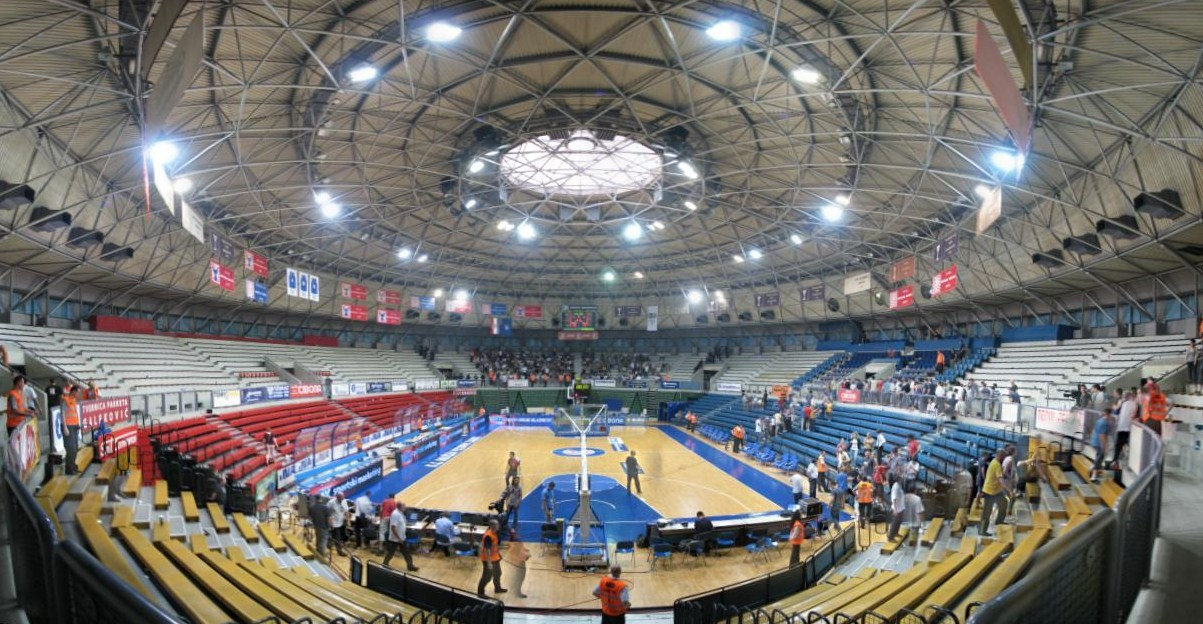
Dražen Petrović Basketball Hall

In November 1975, the basketball club split away from the Lokomotiva sports society and came under the direct control of the municipal authorities of the city of Zagreb. Politicians such as Slavko Šajber became very influential in the club during this period and set about getting the club some financial support. In that regard, the club's main sponsors became four SR Croatia-based food industry giants (all of them state-owned at the time): Kraš, Franck, Badel and Voće. The club took the name Cibona, taken from the Latin cibus bonus, which translates to good food.

For the first trophy under the new name Cibona, they had to wait until 1980, when they won the Yugoslav Cup. The Final match was played in Borovo, and Cibona's opponent was mighty Bosna, led by Bogdan Tanjević on the bench, and Mirza Delibašić on the court. But Cibona, led by impressive Andro Knego, managed to beat them 68:62. This trophy marked the beginning of Cibona's golden era, influenced by two great basketball players and Hall of Famers – Krešimir Ćosić and Dražen Petrović. Between 1980 and 1988, Cibona won 14 major trophies: 3 Yugoslav League championships (1982, 1984, 1985), 7 Yugoslav Cups (1980, 1981, 1982, 1983, 1985, 1986, 1988), 2 FIBA European Champions Cups (1985, 1986), and 2 Cup Winners' Cups (1982, 1987).

At the beginning of the war in the Former Yugoslavia in 1991, the team was forced to emigrate in order to play their games, and in an area with the minimum guarantees required by FIBA. For this reason, the club played in Spain for two years (seasons 1991–92 and 1992–93), specifically in Puerto Real (Cádiz).

=== Croatian powerhouse ===
In independent Croatia, Cibona became a dominant force strongly backed both politically and economically. The crisis of traditionally powerful Dalmatian clubs Split, Zadar and Šibenik also came in hand and Cibona won 11 national titles in a row (from 1992 to 2002). They were also regular Euroleague participant, reaching quarterfinals in 1996/97 and 1999/00.

Cibona's dominance in the national championship was broken in 2003 when Split CO led by coach Petar Skansi, legendary Dino Rađa and revived talent Josip Sesar won the championship. Cibona regained the title next season but was beaten in finals by Zadar season after. In 2005–06 and 2006–07 Cibona won championships beating Zadar in the final series twice but then shockingly missed the final series in 2007/08 after Split eliminated them in semifinal series.

In 2001 regional basketball league called Adriatic League was formed and Cibona took part in it. After disappointing first and second season, Cibona hosted Final Four and reached the final game in 2003/04 but was defeated on the home court by FMP Reflex.

=== Recent seasons ===
Recent seasons have been a mixture of success and failure for Cibona.

In national championship, Cibona won four out of five recent league titles but this dominance is seriously put on test by the rise of large company backed Cedevita.

In European competitions, Cibona lost its Euroleague license for the 2011/12 season after competing in Euroleague since its formation. During 2011/12 and 2012/13 seasons Cibona competed in Eurocup but failed to win any game.

In regional ABA League Cibona had a great 2009/10 season. Cibona entered the Final four held in Arena Zagreb as a top-seeded team. After beating Union Olimpija in semifinals, Cibona faced Partizan in the final game. Partizan won the title thanks to an off-the-glass three-pointer by Dušan Kecman from half-court at the buzzer, bringing the celebration of Cibona players and staff (who already invaded the floor as Bojan Bogdanović scored a corner three-pointer for Cibona with just 0.6 seconds left on the clock) to an abrupt end. The final score was 75–74 and Cibona once again didn't manage to win a title at the home court. The next three seasons in the regional league were disappointing for Cibona, finishing 12th, 7th, and 11th.

In the 2013–14 season, under head coach Slaven Rimac, Cibona won the ABA League championship, despite huge financial problems the club was facing. As a champion of the league, Cibona had direct spot in the Euroleague, but withdrew from it in order to stabilize financially. Eventually, Crvena Zvezda, as third in the standings, took its spot in the Euroleague.

== Honours ==
Total titles: 49

=== Domestic competitions ===
- Croatian League

Winners (21): 1991–92, 1992–93, 1993–94, 1994–95, 1995–96, 1996–97, 1997–98, 1998–99, 1999–00, 2000–01, 2001–02, 2003–04, 2005–06, 2006–07, 2008–09, 2009–10, 2011–12, 2012–13, 2018–19, 2021–22, 2025–26
Runners-up (7): 2002–03, 2004–05, 2013–14, 2014–15, 2015–16, 2016–17, 2017–18

- Croatian Cup

Winners (9): 1994–95, 1995–96, 1998–99, 2000–01, 2001–02, 2008–09, 2012–13, 2021–22, 2022–23
Runners-up (11): 1991–92, 1993–94, 1996–97, 1999–00, 2002–03, 2004–05, 2007–08, 2009–10, 2017–18, 2018–19, 2019–20

- Yugoslav League (defunct)

Winners (3): 1981–82, 1983–84, 1984–85
Runners-up (4): 1960–1961, 1970–71, 1980–81, 1985–86

- Yugoslav Cup (defunct)

Winners (8): 1968–69, 1979–80, 1980–81, 1981–82, 1982–83, 1984–85, 1985–86, 1987–88
Runners-up (2): 1971–72, 1990–91

- Yugoslav Supercup (defunct)

Winners (1): 1984
Runners-up (2): 1980, 1988

=== European competitions ===
- EuroLeague

Winners (2): 1984–85, 1985–86

- FIBA Saporta Cup (defunct)

Winners (2): 1981–82, 1986–87
Semifinalist (3): 1980–81, 1983–84, 1988–89

- FIBA Korać Cup (defunct)

Winners (1): 1971–1972
Runners-up (2): 1979–80, 1987–88

- European Super Cup (semi-official, defunct)

Winners (1): 1987
Runners-up (1): 1986

- Euroleague Opening Tournament (defunct)

Winners (1): 2001

=== Regional competitions ===
- Adriatic League

Winners (1): 2013–14
Runners-up (3): 2003–04, 2008–09, 2009–10

=== Worldwide competitions ===
- FIBA Intercontinental Cup

3rd place (3): 1985, 1986, 1987

=== Other competitions ===
- FIBA International Christmas Tournament (defunct)

3rd place (1): 1992

- Charleroi, Belgium Invitational Game

Winners (1): 2008

- Porec, Croatia Invitational Game

Winners (1): 2009

- Zagreb, Croatia Invitational Game

Winners (1): 2009

- Županja, Croatia Invitational Game

Winners (1): 2010

- Drazen Petrovic Cup

Winners (2): 2012, 2013
Runners-up (1): 2014

- Rijeka Tournament

Winners (1): 2015

=== Individual club awards ===
- Triple Crown

Winners (1): 1984–85

- Small Triple Crown

Winners (1): 1981–82

== Season by season record ==
The following table shows the records from the season 1990–91 in all competitions:

Season by season
Season	League	Cup	Regional	Europe
1990–91	Yugoslav League; Semifinals	Yugoslav Cup; Runners-up	No tournament	Korać Cup; Quarterfinals
1991–92	Croatian League; Champions	Krešimir Ćosić Cup; Runners-up	No tournament	Euroleague; Quarterfinals
1992–93	Croatian League; Champions	Krešimir Ćosić Cup; Semifinals	No tournament	Euroleague; Top 16
1993–94	Croatian League; Champions	Krešimir Ćosić Cup; Runners-up	No tournament	Euroleague; Top 16
1994–95	Croatian League; Champions	Krešimir Ćosić Cup; Champions	No tournament	Euroleague; Quarterfinals
1995–96	Croatian League; Champions	Krešimir Ćosić Cup; Champions	No tournament	Euroleague; Top 16
1996–97	Croatian League; Champions	Krešimir Ćosić Cup; Runners-up	No tournament	Euroleague; Top 16
1997–98	Croatian League; Champions	Krešimir Ćosić Cup; Semifinals	No tournament	Euroleague; Top 16
1998–99	Croatian League; Champions	Krešimir Ćosić Cup; Champions	No tournament	Euroleague; Top 16
1999–00	Croatian League; Champions	Krešimir Ćosić Cup; Runners-up	No tournament	Euroleague; Quarterfinals
2000–01	Croatian League; Champions	Krešimir Ćosić Cup; Champions	No tournament	Euroleague; Top 16
2001–02	Croatian League; Champions	Krešimir Ćosić Cup; Champions	ABA League; Semifinals	Euroleague; Group stage
2002–03	Croatian League; Runners-up	Krešimir Ćosić Cup; Runners-up	ABA League; 5th	Euroleague; Top 16
2003–04	Croatian League; Champions	Krešimir Ćosić Cup; Semifinals	ABA League; Runners-up	Euroleague; Top 16
2004–05	Croatian League; Runners-up	Krešimir Ćosić Cup; Runners-up	ABA League; Quarterfinals	Euroleague; Top 16
2005–06	Croatian League; Champions	Krešimir Ćosić Cup; Semifinals	ABA League; Quarterfinals	Euroleague; Top 16
2006–07	Croatian League; Champions	Krešimir Ćosić Cup; Semifinals	ABA League; Semifinals	Euroleague; Group stage
2007–08	Croatian League; Semifinals	Krešimir Ćosić Cup; Runners-up	ABA League; Quarterfinals	Euroleague; Group stage
2008–09	Croatian League; Champions	Krešimir Ćosić Cup; Champions	ABA League; Runners-up	Euroleague; Top 16
2009–10	Croatian League; Champions	Krešimir Ćosić Cup; Runners-up	ABA League; Runners-up	Euroleague; Top 16
2010–11	Croatian League; Semifinals	Krešimir Ćosić Cup; Semifinals	ABA League; 12th	Euroleague; Group stage
2011–12	Croatian League; Champions	Krešimir Ćosić Cup; Quarterfinals	ABA League; 7th	Eurocup; Group Stage
2012–13	Croatian League; Champions	Krešimir Ćosić Cup; Champions	ABA League; 11th	Eurocup; Group Stage
2013–14	Croatian League; Runners-up	Krešimir Ćosić Cup; Semifinals	ABA League; Champions	Eurocup; Group Stage
2014–15	Croatian League; Runners-up	Krešimir Ćosić Cup; Semifinals	ABA League; 11th	did not participate
2015–16	Croatian League; Runners-up	Krešimir Ćosić Cup; Semifinals	ABA League; 8th	FIBA Europe Cup; Quarter-finals
2016–17	Croatian League; Runners-up	Krešimir Ćosić Cup; Semifinals	ABA League; 7th	FIBA Europe Cup; Quarter-finals
2017–18	Croatian League; Runners-up	Krešimir Ćosić Cup; Runners-up	ABA League; 11th	did not participate
2018–19	Croatian League; Champions	Krešimir Ćosić Cup; Runners-up	ABA League; 7th	did not participate
2019–20	Croatian League cancelled	Krešimir Ćosić Cup; Runners-up	ABA League cancelled	did not participate
2020–21	Croatian League; Semifinals	Krešimir Ćosić Cup; Semifinals	ABA League; 9th	did not participate
2021–22	Croatian League; Champions	Krešimir Ćosić Cup; Champions	ABA League; 8th	did not participate
2022–23	Croatian League; Semifinals	Krešimir Ćosić Cup; Champions	ABA League; 11th	did not participate
2023–24	Croatian League; Semifinals	Krešimir Ćosić Cup; Runners-up	ABA League; 12th	did not participate
2024–25	Croatian League; Semifinals	Krešimir Ćosić Cup; Semifinals	ABA League; 15th	did not participate

== Home arenas ==
- Open basketball court in Kranjčevićeva street (1946–1947)
- Open basketball court Tuškanac (1947–1969)
- Kutija Šibica Sports Hall (1969–1987)
- Dražen Petrović Basketball Hall (1987–present)

== Players ==
=== Current roster ===
Note: Flags indicate national team eligibility at FIBA-sanctioned events. Players may hold other non-FIBA nationalities not displayed.

KK Cibona roster
Players
Coaches

Pos.	No.	Nat.	Name	Ht.	Age
G/F	0	(Kosovo)	Palokaj, Jan	1.94 m (6 ft 4 in)	26 – 5 November 2000
C	1	(Bosnia and Herzegovina)	Lončar, Markus	2.14 m (7 ft 0 in)	30 – 8 April 1996
PG	2	(United States)	McGill, Rickey	1.88 m (6 ft 2 in)	29 – 19 June 1997
PG	3	(Croatia)	Kapusta, Borna	1.82 m (6 ft 0 in)	30 – 24 July 1996
G/F	6	(Croatia)	Perić, Zdravko	1.98 m (6 ft 6 in)	17 – 7 September 2009
SF	7	(Croatia)	Sikirić, Antonio	1.96 m (6 ft 5 in)	23 – 27 October 2003
G	8	(Croatia)	Bart, Vigo	1.92 m (6 ft 4 in)	21 – 26 April 2005
C	9	(Croatia)	Čakarun, Marjan	2.04 m (6 ft 8 in)	36 – 27 April 1990
G	12	(Croatia)	Bubalo, Bruno	1.95 m (6 ft 5 in)	19 – 2 June 2007
F	14	(Croatia)	Mazalin, Lovro	2.05 m (6 ft 9 in)	29 – 30 June 1997
F	17	(Croatia)	Serdarušić, Renato	2.02 m (6 ft 8 in)	25 – 30 January 2001
SG	18	(Croatia)	Badžim, Roko	1.96 m (6 ft 5 in)	29 – 18 August 1997
PG	19	(Croatia)	Gnjidić, Lovro	1.97 m (6 ft 6 in)	25 – 18 April 2001
F	24	(Croatia)	Katanović, Borna	1.97 m (6 ft 6 in)	19 – 28 June 2007
F/C	33	(United States)	Mitchell, Tre	2.06 m (6 ft 9 in)	26 – 24 September 2000
F/C	44	(United States)	Hepa, Kamaka	2.08 m (6 ft 10 in)	26 – 27 January 2000
F/C	71	(Croatia)	Vuković, Domagoj	2.09 m (6 ft 10 in)	33 – 29 October 1993
G	99	(United States)	Battle, Khalif	1.96 m (6 ft 5 in)	26 – 24 June 2000

Head coach

- (Croatia) Ivan Tomas

Assistant coach(es)

- (Croatia) Andrej Štimac
- (Croatia) Neven Nikolić
- (Croatia) Roko Anzulović

Strength & conditioning coach(es)

- (Croatia) Bruno Damjan

Physiotherapist(s)

- (Croatia) Nikica Šižgorić
- (Croatia) Ivan Jazbec

Team manager

- (Croatia) Ante Pavlak

Legend

- (C) Team captain
- Injured

- Roster
Updated: October 29, 2026

=== Depth chart ===
Pos.	Starting 5	Bench 1	Bench 2	Bench 3
C	Tre Mitchell	Markus Lončar	Marjan Čakarun
PF	Lovro Mazalin	Kamaka Hepa	Domagoj Vuković
SF	Antonio Sikirić	Renato Serdarušić	Borna Katanović	Jan Palokaj
SG	Khalif Battle	Roko Badžim	Vigo Bart	Zdravko Perić
PG	Rickey McGill	Lovro Gnjidić	Borna Kapusta	Bruno Bubalo

=== Retired numbers ===
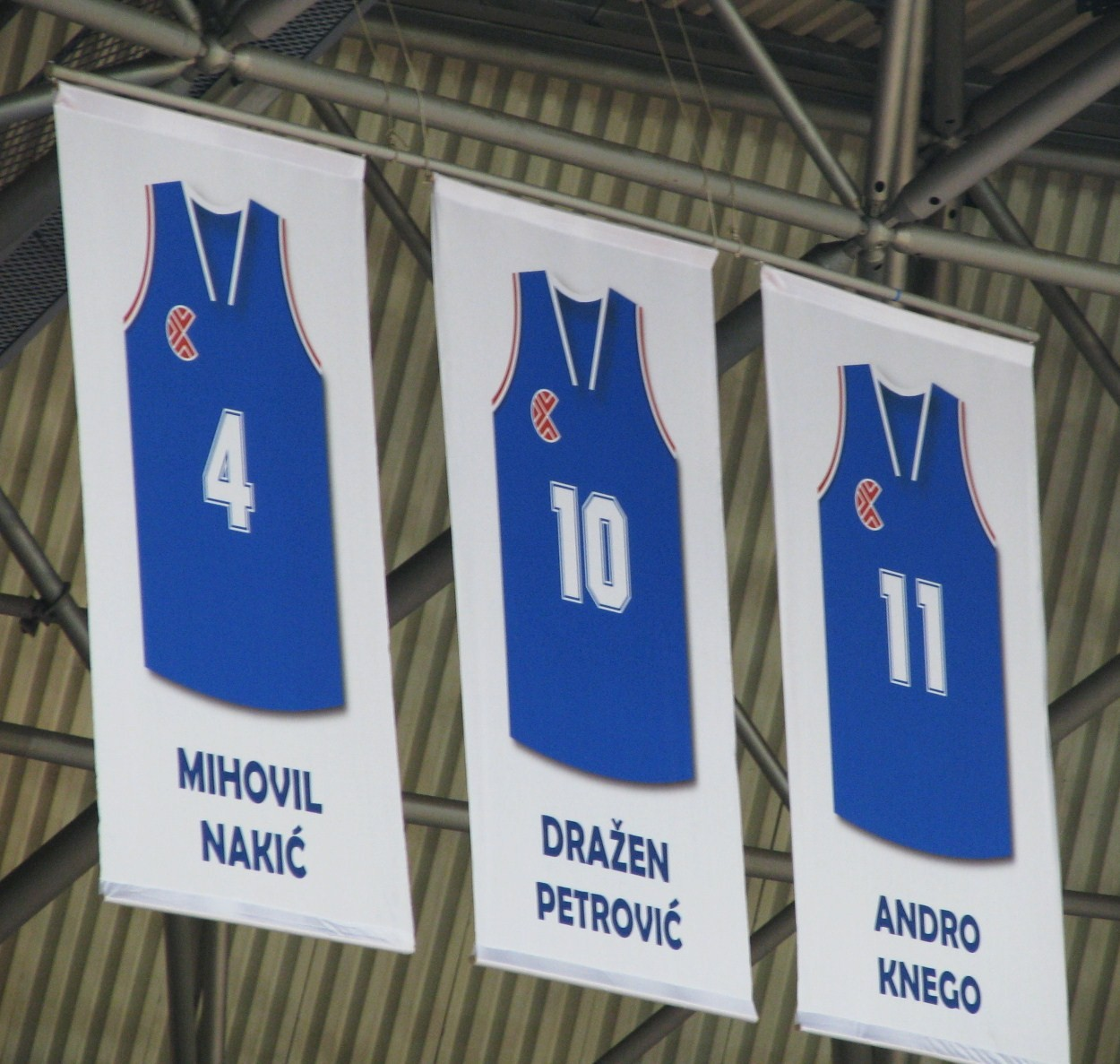
Nakić, D. Petrović & Knego's jerseys hanging in the rafters of the Dražen Petrović Basketball Hall

- 4 – (Croatia) Mihovil Nakić
- 10 – (Croatia) Dražen Petrović
- 11 – (Croatia) Andro Knego
- 20 – (Croatia) Marin Rozić

=== Players at the NBA draft ===
^	Denotes player who has been inducted to the Naismith Memorial Basketball Hall of Fame
^{x}	Denotes player who has been selected for at least one All-NBA Team
^{#}	Denotes player who has never appeared in an NBA regular-season or playoff game

Position	Player	Year	Round	Pick	Drafted by
SG	(Socialist Federal Republic of Yugoslavia) Dražen Petrović^{^x}	1986	3rd round	60th	Portland Trail Blazers
C	(Socialist Federal Republic of Yugoslavia) Franjo Arapović^{#}	1987	7th round	159th	Atlanta Hawks
SG/SF	(Croatia) Gordan Giriček	1999	2nd round	40th	Dallas Mavericks
SG	(Croatia) Josip Sesar^{#}	2000	2nd round	47th	Portland Trail Blazers
SG	(Croatia) Zoran Planinić	2003	1st round	22nd	New Jersey Nets
PF	(Croatia) Damir Markota	2006	2nd round	59th	San Antonio Spurs
SG/SF	(Croatia) Bojan Bogdanović	2011	2nd round	31st	Miami Heat
PF/C	(Croatia) Tomislav Zubčić^{#}	2012	2nd round	56th	Toronto Raptors
PF	(Croatia) Dario Šarić	2014	1st round	12th	Orlando Magic
C	(Croatia) Ante Žižić	2016	1st round	23rd	Boston Celtics

=== Notable players ===
Note: Flags indicate national team eligibility at FIBA-sanctioned events. Players may hold other non-FIBA nationalities not displayed.

Criteria

To appear in this section a player must have either:

- Set a club record or won an individual award while at the club
- Played at least one official international match for their national team at any time
- Played at least one official NBA match at any time.

- (Bosnia and Herzegovina) Jasmin Hukić
- (Bosnia and Herzegovina) Bariša Krasić
- (Bosnia and Herzegovina) Haris Mujezinović
- (Canada) Jermaine Anderson
- (Croatia) Vladan Alanović
- (Croatia) Lukša Andrić
- (Croatia) Franjo Arapović
- (Croatia) Dalibor Bagarić
- (Croatia) Marino Baždarić
- (Croatia) Bojan Bogdanović
- (Croatia) Danko Cvjetićanin
- (Croatia) Krešimir Ćosić
- (Croatia) Zoran Čutura
- (Croatia) Gordan Giriček
- (Croatia) Alan Gregov
- (Croatia) Vinko Jelovac
- (Croatia) Mario Kasun
- (Croatia) Andro Knego
- (Croatia) Vladimir Krstić
- (Croatia) Davor Kus
- (Croatia) Matej Mamić
- (Croatia) Davor Marcelić
- (Croatia) Damir Markota
- (Croatia) Veljko Mršić
- (Croatia) Damir Mulaomerović
- (Croatia) Aramis Naglić
- (Croatia) Mihovil Nakić
- (Croatia) Sandro Nicević
- (Croatia) Aleksandar Petrović
- (Croatia) Dražen Petrović
- (Croatia) Zoran Planinić
- (Croatia) Nikola Plećaš
- (Croatia) Marko Popović
- (Croatia) Nikola Prkačin
- (Croatia) Zdravko Radulović
- (Croatia) Dino Rađa
- (Croatia) Damir Rančić
- (Croatia) Slaven Rimac
- (Croatia) Damjan Rudež
- (Croatia) Tomislav Ružić
- (Croatia) Josip Sesar
- (Croatia) Mate Skelin
- (Croatia) Rok Stipčević
- (Croatia) Marko Tomas
- (Croatia) Dario Šarić
- (Croatia) Bruno Šundov
- (Croatia) Josip Vranković
- (Croatia) Stojko Vranković
- (Croatia) Andrija Žižić
- (Croatia) Ante Žižić
- (Croatia) Luka Žorić
- (Croatia) Ivica Žurić
- (Hungary) Marton Bader
- (Kosovo) Dardan Berisha
- (Kosovo) Jan Palokaj
- (Panama) Chris Warren
- (Russia) Evgeni Kisurin
- (United States) Chucky Atkins
- (United States) Alan Anderson
- (United States) Jerel Blassingame
- (United States) Gerald Fitch
- (United States) Jamont Gordon
- (United States) Smush Parker
- (United States) Scoonie Penn
- (United States) Bracey Wright

=== Members of the Basketball Hall of Fame ===
- (Croatia) Krešimir Ćosić
- (Croatia) Mirko Novosel
- (Croatia) Dražen Petrović
- (Croatia) Dino Rađa

== Top performances in European and worldwide competitions ==
Season	Achievement	Notes
Euroleague
1982–83	Semi-final group stage	6th place in a group with Ford Cantù, Billy Milano, Real Madrid, CSKA Moscow and Maccabi Tel Aviv
1984–85	Champions	defeated Real Madrid 87-78 in the final of European Champions Cup in Athens
1985–86	Champions	defeated Žalgiris 94-82 in the final of European Champions Cup in Budapest
1991–92	Quarter-finals	eliminated by Montigalà Joventut, 68-73 (L) in Zagreb and 67-92 (L) in Badalona
1994–95	Quarter-finals	eliminated by Real Madrid Teka, 78-82 (L) in Zagreb and 70-82 (L) in Madrid
1999–00	Quarter-finals	eliminated by Panathinaikos, 62-73 (L) in Athens and 63-69 (L) in Zagreb
FIBA Saporta Cup
1969–70	Quarter-finals	eliminated by Fides Napoli, 80-89 (L) in Zagreb and 84-102 (L) in Naples
1980–81	Semi-finals	eliminated by FC Barcelona, 85-92 (L) in Barcelona and 79-75 (W) in Zagreb
1981–82	Champions	defeated Real Madrid 96-95 in the final of European Cup Winners' Cup in Brussels
1983–84	Semi-finals	eliminated by Real Madrid, 89-91 (L) in Zagreb and 80-94 (L) in Madrid
1986–87	Champions	defeated Scavolini Pesaro 89-74 in the final of European Cup Winners' Cup in Novi Sad
1988–89	Semi-finals	eliminated by Real Madrid, 91-92 (L) in Zagreb and 97-119 (L) in Madrid
FIBA Korać Cup
1972	Champions	defeated OKK Beograd, 71-83 (L) in Belgrade and 94-73 (W) in Zagreb in the double finals of Korać Cup
1979–80	Final	lost to Arrigoni Rieti, 71-76 in the final (Liège)
1987–88	Final	lost to Real Madrid, 89-102 (L) in Madrid and 94-93 (W) in Zagreb in the double final
1990–91	Quarter-finals	eliminated by Shampoo Clear Cantù, 70-80 (L) in Cucciago and 77-80 (L) in Zagreb
FIBA Europe Cup
2015–16	Quarter-finals	eliminated 2–1 by Enisey, 92-94 (L) in Krasnoyarsk, 77-69 (W) in Zagreb and 78-82 (L) in Krasnoyarsk
2016–17	Quarter-finals	eliminated by Élan Chalon, 87-85 (W) in Zagreb and 78-83 (L) in Chalon-sur-Saône
Intercontinental Cup
1985	3rd place	3rd place in Barcelona, lost to FC Barcelona 68–74 in the semi-final (Girona), defeated San Andrés 109-82 in the 3rd place game
1986	3rd place	3rd place in Buenos Aires, lost to Žalgiris 77–104 in the semi-final, defeated Corinthians 119-96 in the 3rd place game
1987	3rd place	3rd place in Milan, lost to Tracer Milano 83–94 in the semi-final, defeated Maccabi Tel Aviv 106-96 in the 3rd place game

== The road to the European Cup victories ==
1972 FIBA Korać Cup

Round	Team	Home	Away
Quarter-finals	(France) Caen	103–87	109–83
Semi-finals	(Belgium) Standard Liège	71–54	96–91
Finals	(Socialist Federal Republic of Yugoslavia) OKK Beograd	94–73	71–83

1981–82 FIBA European Cup Winners' Cup

Round	Team	Home	Away
Quarter-finals	(England) Sutton & Crystal Palace	105–97	74–70
Quarter-finals	(Italy) Sinudyne Bologna	121–91	81–88
Quarter-finals	(Israel) Hapoel Ramat Gan	98–97	81–85
Semi-finals	(Soviet Union) Stroitel	92–66	66–82
Final	(Spain) Real Madrid	96–95	

1984–85 FIBA European Champions Cup

Round	Team	Home	Away
1st Round	(Bulgaria) CSKA Sofia	89–73	91–97
2nd Round	(Finland) NMKY Helsinki	102–95	88–83
Semi-finals	(Spain) Real Madrid	99–90	89–87
Semi-finals	(Italy) Granarolo Bologna	96–89	72–81
Semi-finals	(Israel) Maccabi Tel Aviv	88–77	87–88
Semi-finals	(Italy) Banco di Roma Virtus	97–83	87–89
Semi-finals	(Soviet Union) CSKA Moscow	95–77	71–65
Final	(Spain) Real Madrid	87–78	

1985–86 FIBA European Champions Cup

Round	Team	Home	Away
1st Round	(Turkey) Galatasaray	121–106	110–97
2nd Round	(Austria) Klosterneuburg	85–70	98–83
Semi-finals	(Israel) Maccabi Tel Aviv	90–86	102–105
Semi-finals	(Italy) Simac Milano	111–95	66–90
Semi-finals	(Soviet Union) Žalgiris	99–90	91–94
Semi-finals	(Spain) Real Madrid	88–81	108–91
Semi-finals	(France) Limoges CSP	116–106	106–95
Final	(Soviet Union) Žalgiris	94–82	

1986–87 FIBA European Cup Winners' Cup

Round	Team	Home	Away
Quarter-finals	(Italy) Scavolini Pesaro	123–99	83–82
Quarter-finals	(Belgium) Maes Pils	130–90	121–98
Quarter-finals	(Turkey) Efes Pilsen	125–78	86–70
Semi-finals	(France) ASVEL	109–93	98–82
Final	(Italy) Scavolini Pesaro	89–74	
