= Yugoslav Basketball Cup =

Former Yugoslav men's basketball team

- Sport: Basketball
- Founded: 1959; 67 years ago
- First season: 1959
- Folded: 1992; 34 years ago
- Country: (Socialist Federal Republic of Yugoslavia) SFR Yugoslavia; 1959–1992
- Most titles: Cibona (8 titles)
- Related competitions: First Federal League (1959–1992)

The Yugoslav Basketball Cup (Serbo-Croatian: Kup Jugoslavije u košarci / Куп Југославије у кошарци) was the men's national basketball cup of Yugoslavia between its inauguration in 1959 and the breakup of Yugoslavia.

== Title holders ==
- 1959 ŽKK Ljubljana
- 1960 OKK Beograd
- 1961 Not held
- 1962 OKK Beograd
- 1962–68 Not held
- 1968–69 Lokomotiva
- 1969–70 Zadar
- 1970–71 Crvena zvezda
- 1971–72 Jugoplastika
- 1972–73 Crvena zvezda
- 1973–74 Jugoplastika
- 1974–75 Crvena zvezda
- 1975–76 Radnički Belgrade
- 1976–77 Jugoplastika
- 1977–78 Bosna
- 1978–79 Partizan
- 1979–80 Cibona
- 1980–81 Cibona
- 1981–82 Cibona
- 1982–83 Cibona
- 1983–84 Bosna
- 1984–85 Cibona
- 1985–86 Cibona
- 1986–87 IMT
- 1987–88 Cibona
- 1988–89 Partizan
- 1989–90 Jugoplastika
- 1990–91 POP 84
- 1991–92 Partizan

== The finals ==
Season	Champions	Score	Runners-up	Venue	Location	Winning Coach
1959	ŽKK Ljubljana	mini league	OKK Beograd		Belgrade	(Socialist Federal Republic of Yugoslavia) Kruno Brumen
1960	OKK Beograd	mini league	AŠK Olimpija		Slavonski Brod	(Socialist Federal Republic of Yugoslavia) Borislav Stanković
1961	Not held					
1962	OKK Beograd	103–82	Partizan		Belgrade	(Socialist Federal Republic of Yugoslavia) Aleksandar Nikolić
1962–68	Not held					
1968–69	Lokomotiva	78–77	AŠK Olimpija		Zagreb	(Socialist Federal Republic of Yugoslavia) Mirko Novosel
1969–70	Zadar	64–60	Jugoplastika		Split	(Socialist Federal Republic of Yugoslavia) Trpimir Lokin
1970–71	Crvena zvezda	82–70	AŠK Olimpija	Tivoli Hall	Ljubljana	(Socialist Federal Republic of Yugoslavia) Đorđe Andrijašević
1971–72	Jugoplastika	88–81	Lokomotiva		Zagreb	(Socialist Federal Republic of Yugoslavia) Branko Radović
1972–73	Crvena zvezda	71–65	Partizan	Dom Sportova	Zagreb	(Socialist Federal Republic of Yugoslavia) Bratislav Đorđević
1973–74	Jugoplastika	92–85	Crvena zvezda		Split	(Socialist Federal Republic of Yugoslavia) Petar Skansi
1974–75	Crvena zvezda	82–72	Jugoplastika	Čair Sports Center	Niš	(Socialist Federal Republic of Yugoslavia) Nemanja Đurić
1975–76	Radnički Belgrade	89–75	Rabotnički	Veliki Park Sports Hall	Užice	(Socialist Federal Republic of Yugoslavia) Slobodan Ivković
1976–77	Jugoplastika	80–62	Kvarner	Dom Sportova	Zagreb	(Socialist Federal Republic of Yugoslavia) Petar Skansi (2)
1977–78	Bosna	98–87	Radnički Belgrade	Hala Zorka	Šabac	(Socialist Federal Republic of Yugoslavia) Bogdan Tanjević
1978–79	Partizan	93–86	Zadar	Čair Sports Center	Niš	(Socialist Federal Republic of Yugoslavia) Dušan Ivković
1979–80	Cibona	68–62	Bosna	Borovo Sports Hall	Vukovar	(Socialist Federal Republic of Yugoslavia) Mirko Novosel (2)
1980–81	Cibona	112–87	Kvarner	Mladost Hall	Karlovac	(Socialist Federal Republic of Yugoslavia) Mirko Novosel (3)
1981–82	Cibona	90–79	Iskra Olimpija	SPC Vojvodina	Novi Sad	(Socialist Federal Republic of Yugoslavia) Mirko Novosel (4)
1982–83	Cibona	92–79	Rabotnički		Bosanski Brod	(Socialist Federal Republic of Yugoslavia) Mirko Novosel (5)
1983–84	Bosna	92–78	Alkar	Metković Sports Hall	Metković	(Socialist Federal Republic of Yugoslavia) Svetislav Pešić
1984–85	Cibona	104–83	Jugoplastika	Zrinjevac Sport Hall	Osijek	(Socialist Federal Republic of Yugoslavia) Željko Pavličević
1985–86	Cibona	110–98	Bosna	SPC Vojvodina	Novi Sad	(Socialist Federal Republic of Yugoslavia) Željko Pavličević (2)
1986–87	IMT	76–73	Smelt Olimpija	Čair Sports Center	Niš	(Socialist Federal Republic of Yugoslavia) Dragan Šakota
1987–88	Cibona	82–80	Jugoplastika	Dvorana Mladosti	Rijeka	(Socialist Federal Republic of Yugoslavia) Mirko Novosel (6)
1988–89	Partizan	87–74	Jugoplastika	Tabor Hall	Maribor	(Socialist Federal Republic of Yugoslavia) Duško Vujošević
1989–90	Jugoplastika	79–77	Crvena zvezda	ŠD Gospino polje	Dubrovnik	(Socialist Federal Republic of Yugoslavia) Božidar Maljković
1990–91	POP 84	80–79	Cibona	Dvorana Mladosti	Rijeka	(Socialist Federal Republic of Yugoslavia) Željko Pavličević (3)
1991–92	Partizan	105–70	Bosna	Čair Sports Center	Niš	(Socialist Federal Republic of Yugoslavia) Željko Obradović

== Performance by club ==
Rank	Club	Titles	Runner-up	Winning years
1	(Socialist Republic of Croatia) Cibona	8	2	1968–69, 1979–80, 1980–81, 1981–82, 1982–83, 1984–85, 1985–86, 1987–88
2	(Socialist Republic of Croatia) Split	5	5	1971–72, 1973–74, 1976–77, 1989–90, 1990–91
3	(Socialist Republic of Serbia) Crvena zvezda	3	2	1970–71, 1972–73, 1974–75
3	(Socialist Republic of Serbia) Partizan	3	2	1978–79, 1988–89, 1991–92
4	(Socialist Republic of Bosnia and Herzegovina) Bosna	2	3	1977–78, 1983–84
6	(Socialist Republic of Serbia) OKK Beograd	2	1	1960, 1962
7	(Socialist Republic of Croatia) Zadar	1	1	1969–70
8	(Socialist Republic of Serbia) Radnički Belgrade	1	1	1975–76
9	(Socialist Republic of Slovenia) ŽKK Ljubljana	1	0	1959
10	(Socialist Republic of Serbia) IMT	1	0	1986–87
11	(Socialist Republic of Slovenia) Olimpija	0	5	
12	(Socialist Republic of Macedonia) Rabotnički	0	2	
13	(Socialist Republic of Croatia) Kvarner	0	2	
14	(Socialist Republic of Croatia) Alkar	0	1	

== See also ==
- Yugoslav First Basketball League
- Yugoslav 1. B Federal Basketball League
- Federal Republic of Yugoslavia Basketball Cup
- Adriatic League
- Adriatic League Supercup
