= 1985–86 FIBA European Champions Cup =

- League: FIBA European Champions Cup
- Sport: Basketball

Final
- Champions: (Socialist Federal Republic of Yugoslavia) Cibona (2nd title)
- Runners-up: (Soviet Union) Žalgiris

FIBA European Champions Cup seasons
- ← 1984–85 1986–87 →

The 1985–86 FIBA European Champions Cup was the 29th edition of the FIBA European Champions Cup club competition (now called EuroLeague). The Final was held at the Sportcsarnok in Budapest, Hungary, on April 3, 1986. It was won by Cibona for the second time in a row. They defeated Žalgiris in the finals, by a result of 94–82.

== Competition system ==
- 25 teams (European national domestic league champions, plus the then current title holders), playing in a tournament system, played knock-out rounds on a home and away basis. The aggregate score of both games decided the winner.
- The six remaining teams after the knock-out rounds entered a Semifinal Group Stage, which was played as a round-robin. The final standing was based on individual wins and defeats. In the case of a tie between two or more teams after the group stage, the following criteria were used: 1) number of wins in one-to-one games between the teams; 2) basket average between the teams; 3) general basket average within the group.
- The winner and the runner-up of the Semifinal Group Stage qualified for the final, which was played at a predetermined venue.

== Preliminary round ==
Team 1	Agg.	Team 2	1st leg	2nd leg
Partizani Tirana (Albania)	162-175	(Greece) Aris	81–80	81–95

== First round ==
Team 1	Agg.	Team 2	1st leg	2nd leg
Neptune (Republic of Ireland)	178-182	(Austria) Klosterneuburg	84–99	94–83
Galatasaray (Turkey)	203-231	(Socialist Federal Republic of Yugoslavia) Cibona	97–110	106–121
Honvéd (Hungary)	151-162	(Switzerland) Fribourg Olympic	84–80	67–82
Real Madrid (Spain)	151-137	(Scotland) Murray Edinburgh	75–65	76–72
Solna (Sweden)	182-201	(Netherlands) Nashua EBBC	95–93	87–108
Kingston (England)	185-232	(Israel) Maccabi Elite Tel Aviv	93–112	92–120
AEL (Cyprus)	113-202	(Bulgaria) Akademik Varna	49–121	64–81
Inter Slovnaft (Czechoslovakia)	167-229	(Soviet Union) Žalgiris	97–123	70–106
NMKY Helsinki (Finland)	183-166	(Poland) Zagłębie	91–81	92–85
Simac Milano (Italy)	233-122	(Luxembourg) T71 Dudelange	116–48	117–74
Bayer 04 Leverkusen (West Germany)	148-182	(Greece) Aris	76–93	72–89
Limoges CSP (France)	177-171	(Belgium) Sunair Oostende	87–78	90–93

== Second round ==
Team 1	Agg.	Team 2	1st leg	2nd leg
Klosterneuburg (Austria)	153-183	(Socialist Federal Republic of Yugoslavia) Cibona	83–98	70–85
Fribourg Olympic (Switzerland)	149-173	(Spain) Real Madrid	68–84	81–89
Nashua EBBC (Netherlands)	181-216	(Israel) Maccabi Elite Tel Aviv	95–113	86–103
Akademik Varna (Bulgaria)	152-222	(Soviet Union) Žalgiris	87–125	65–97
NMKY Helsinki (Finland)	182-207	(Italy) Simac Milano	92-106	90–101
Aris (Greece)	176-186	(France) Limoges CSP	89–81	87–105

== Semifinal group stage ==
Key to colors
Top two places in the group advance to Final

	Team	Pld	Pts	W	L	PF	PA
1.	(Socialist Federal Republic of Yugoslavia) Cibona	10	17	7	3	977	933
2.	(Soviet Union) Žalgiris	10	17	7	3	931	915
3.	(Italy) Simac Milano	10	16	6	4	881	837
4.	(Spain) Real Madrid	10	15	5	5	944	906
5.	(Israel) Maccabi Elite Tel Aviv	10	14	4	6	907	946
6.	(France) Limoges CSP	10	11	1	9	910	1013

== Final ==
April 3, Sportcsarnok, Budapest

Team 1	Score	Team 2
Cibona (Socialist Federal Republic of Yugoslavia)	94–82	(Soviet Union) Žalgiris

1985–86 FIBA European Champions Cup
Champions

Cibona
2nd Title

== Awards ==
=== FIBA European Champions Cup Finals Top Scorer ===
- (Soviet Union) Arvydas Sabonis ( (Soviet Union) Žalgiris)
