= 1984–85 FIBA European Champions Cup =

- League: FIBA European Champions Cup
- Sport: Basketball
- Duration: September 21, 1984 - April 3, 1985

Final
- Champions: (Socialist Federal Republic of Yugoslavia) Cibona (1st title)
- Runners-up: (Spain) Real Madrid

FIBA European Champions Cup seasons
- ← 1983–84 1985–86 →

The 1984–85 FIBA European Champions Cup was the 28th season of the FIBA European Champions Cup club competition (now called EuroLeague). It was the first season of the competition that included the 3 point field goal. The Final was held at the Peace and Friendship Stadium in Piraeus, Greece, on April 3, 1985. Cibona won its first title, defeating Spanish side, Real Madrid, by a result of 87–78.

== Competition system ==
- 25 teams (European national domestic league champions, plus the then current title holders), playing in a tournament system, played knock-out rounds on a home and away basis. The aggregate score of both games decided the winner.
- The six remaining teams after the knock-out rounds entered a Semifinal Group Stage, which was played as a round-robin. The final standing was based on individual wins and defeats. In the case of a tie between two or more teams after the group stage, the following criteria were used: 1) number of wins in one-to-one games between the teams; 2) basket average between the teams; 3) general basket average within the group.
- The winner and the runner-up of the Semifinal Group Stage qualified for the final, which was played at a predetermined venue.

== Preliminary round ==
Team 1	Agg.	Team 2	1st leg	2nd leg
Achilleas Kaimakli (Cyprus)	99-286	(Israel) Maccabi Elite Tel Aviv	43–143	56–143

== First round ==
Team 1	Agg.	Team 2	1st leg	2nd leg
CSKA Sofia (Bulgaria)	170-180	(Socialist Federal Republic of Yugoslavia) Cibona	97–91	73–89
NMKY Helsinki (Finland)	170-167	(Netherlands) Nashua EBBC	87–81	83–86
Klosterneuburg (Austria)	132-195	(Spain) Real Madrid	63–103	69–92
Partizani Tirana (Albania)	164-181	(Switzerland) Vevey	87–79	77–102
Steaua București (Romania)	191-245	(Israel) Maccabi Elite Tel Aviv	103–114	88–131
Sunair Oostende (Belgium)	165-159	(Scotland) Murray Edinburgh	76–80	89–79
T71 Dudelange (Luxembourg)	114-320	(Soviet Union) CSKA Moscow	60–161	54–159
Solent Stars (England)	198-225	(France) Limoges CSP	101–114	97–111
SISU (Denmark)	147-287	(Italy) Banco di Roma	87–146	60–141
Efes Pilsen (Turkey)	157-134	(Czechoslovakia) Rudá hvězda Pardubice	80–62	77–72
Honvéd (Hungary)	170-190	(Italy) Granarolo Bologna	93–94	77–96
Lech Poznań (Poland)	173-179	(Greece) Panathinaikos	86–83	87–96

== Second round ==
Team 1	Agg.	Team 2	1st leg	2nd leg
NMKY Helsinki (Finland)	178-190	(Socialist Federal Republic of Yugoslavia) Cibona	83–88	95–102
Vevey (Switzerland)	153-163	(Spain) Real Madrid	74–84	79–79
Sunair Oostende (Belgium)	165-212	(Israel) Maccabi Elite Tel Aviv	90–80	75–132
CSKA Moscow (Soviet Union)	182-162	(France) Limoges CSP	101–93	81–69
Efes Pilsen (Turkey)	130-163	(Italy) Banco di Roma	75-73	55–90
Panathinaikos (Greece)	155-183	(Italy) Granarolo Bologna	88–85	67–98

== Semifinal group stage ==
Key to colors
Top two places in the group advance to Final

	Team	Pld	Pts	W	L	PF	PA
1.	(Socialist Federal Republic of Yugoslavia) Cibona	10	17	7	3	881	826
2.	(Spain) Real Madrid	10	17	7	3	933	874
3.	(Israel) Maccabi Elite Tel Aviv	10	16	6	4	861	878
4.	(Soviet Union) CSKA Moscow	10	14	4	6	823	819
5.	(Italy) Banco di Roma	10	14	4	6	840	882
6.	(Italy) Granarolo Bologna	10	12	2	8	840	899

== Final ==
April 3, Peace and Friendship Stadium, Piraeus

Team 1	Score	Team 2
Cibona (Socialist Federal Republic of Yugoslavia)	87–78	(Spain) Real Madrid

1984–85 FIBA European Champions Cup
Champions

Cibona
1st Title

== Awards ==
=== FIBA European Champions Cup Finals Top Scorer ===
- (Socialist Federal Republic of Yugoslavia) Dražen Petrović ( (Socialist Federal Republic of Yugoslavia) Cibona)
