= Soviet Union men's national basketball team =

Soviet Union
- FIBA ranking: Defunct
- Joined FIBA: 1947; 79 years ago
- FIBA zone: FIBA Europe
- National federation: Soviet Basketball Federation
- Coach: Various

Olympic Games
- Appearances: 9
- Medals: (gold) Gold: (1972, 1988); (silver) Silver: (1952, 1956, 1960, 1964); (bronze) Bronze: (1968, 1976, 1980)

FIBA World Cup
- Appearances: 9
- Medals: (gold) Gold: (1967, 1974, 1982); (silver) Silver: (1978, 1986, 1990); (bronze) Bronze: (1963, 1970)

FIBA EuroBasket
- Appearances: 21
- Medals: (gold) Gold: (1947, 1951, 1953, 1957, 1959, 1961, 1963, 1965, 1967, 1969, 1971, 1979, 1981, 1985); (silver) Silver: (1975, 1977, 1987); (bronze) Bronze: (1955, 1973, 1983, 1989)
Home	Away

First international
- Soviet Union 50–11 Yugoslavia (Prague, Czechoslovakia; 27 April 1947)

Biggest win
- Soviet Union 118–14 Denmark (Moscow, Soviet Union; 25 May 1953)

Biggest defeat
- Soviet Union 55–89 United States (Melbourne, Australia; 1 December 1956)

The Soviet Union men's national basketball team (Russian: Сбо́рная СССР по баскетболу, romanized: sbórnaya SSSR po basketbolu) was the national basketball team that represented the Soviet Union in international competitions. After the dissolution of the Soviet Union in 1991, the successor countries all set up their own national teams.

Based on the number of medals, the basketball program of the former Soviet Union remains one of the most successful in the history of international basketball competitions, behind that of the United States but ahead of Spain.

== History ==
=== EuroBasket 1947 ===
The Soviets first competed in the European championship at EuroBasket 1947. They quickly established their dominance of the European field, winning both preliminary round games, all three semifinal round games, and the championship match against defending gold medallists Czechoslovakia. The Soviets outscored their opponents by an aggregate 126 points over their 6 wins, an average margin of victory of 21 points.

=== EuroBasket 1951 ===
After refusing to host EuroBasket 1949 as was FIBA Europe's expectation of the Soviet Union and skipping the tournament entirely, the Soviets returned to European championships in EuroBasket 1951. They dominated the early portions of the tournament, outscoring opponents 312–117 in their four preliminary round wins. The three games of the semifinal round also posed little problem for the Soviet team, as the closest any opponent came was the Czechoslovak team losing by only 16. In the first game of the final round, which was essentially a semifinal game, the Soviets defeated Bulgaria 72–54 to advance to the championship game, a rematch against Czechoslovakia.

In that match, the Soviet team faced its first true close test in European play. A 44–44 tie was broken by Soviet Ilmar Kullam from the free throw line with 1 second left on the clock to give the Soviets a 45–44 win. Even that was called into question, however, as one of the referees initially signaled that Kullam had stepped on the free throw line during the shot and therefore the point would be disallowed. After consultation with another referee, however, the free throw was upheld and the Soviets had won their second European championship.

=== EuroBasket 1953 ===
The Soviets maintained their domination at EuroBasket 1953, which they hosted in Moscow. They had no trouble in a 3–0 preliminary round that included a 104-point slaughter of Denmark. An eight-team final round also posed little difficulty for the squad, with the closest of the 7 wins being a 29–24 slog against Hungary as the Soviets extended their streak to 3 championships with 25 wins and no losses.

=== EuroBasket 1955 ===
Through four preliminary round games and the first three final round games, the Soviets extended their winning streak to 31 games. With four games left in the final round robin of EuroBasket 1955, the Soviets were facing the pesky Czechoslovakia team, which was so far had been the closest to defeating the Soviet Union, in 1951. Czechoslovakia, however, had already lost twice in the round, and had a record of 1–2 to the Soviets' 3–0 going into the game.

In a shocking result, the 81–74 final score did not favor the Soviet Union. They did so once more before the tournament was over, losing to Hungary in a game that essentially determined the gold medal despite being only the 6th of 7 matches each team played. The Soviets' 5–2 record in the round matched that of Czechoslovakia, and the Soviets finished with only a bronze medal.

=== EuroBasket 1957 ===
Two years later, at EuroBasket 1957 in Sofia, the Soviets returned to form. They won their three preliminary round games and then their seven final round games, including an exciting final match of the round robin against similarly undefeated hosts Bulgaria. The Soviets trailed 23–19 at halftime, but battled back to a 60–57 victory to take their 4th European championship.

== Honours ==
=== Medals table ===
Games	Gold	Silver	Bronze	Total
Summer Olympics	2	4	3	9
FIBA World Cup	3	3	2	8
EuroBasket	14	3	4	21
FIBA International Christmas Tournament	3	1	1	5
McDonald's Championship	0	1	0	1
Grand Totals	22	12	10	44

== Competition results ==
=== Olympic Games ===
Olympic Games record
Year	Result	Pld	W	L
(Germany) 1936	Did not participate			
(United Kingdom) 1948	Did not participate			
(Finland) 1952	2nd place, silver medalist(s)	8	6	2
(Australia) 1956	2nd place, silver medalist(s)	8	5	3
(Italy) 1960	2nd place, silver medalist(s)	8	6	2
(Japan) 1964	2nd place, silver medalist(s)	9	8	1
(Mexico) 1968	3rd place, bronze medalist(s)	9	8	1
(West Germany) 1972	1st place, gold medalist(s)	9	9	0
(Canada) 1976	3rd place, bronze medalist(s)	7	6	1
(Soviet Union) 1980	3rd place, bronze medalist(s)	8	6	2
(United States) 1984	Originally qualified, but withdrew			
(South Korea) 1988	1st place, gold medalist(s)	8	7	1
(Spain) 1992	4th place	8	5	3
Total	10/13	82	66	16

=== FIBA World Championship ===
FIBA World Championship record
Year	Result	Pld	W	L
(Argentina) 1950	did not participate			
(Brazil) 1954	did not participate			
(Chile) 1959	6th place	9	7	2
(Brazil) 1963	3rd place, bronze medalist(s)	9	7	2
(Uruguay) 1967	1st place, gold medalist(s)	9	8	1
(Socialist Federal Republic of Yugoslavia) 1970	3rd place, bronze medalist(s)	9	7	2
(Puerto Rico) 1974	1st place, gold medalist(s)	9	8	1
(Philippines) 1978	2nd place, silver medalist(s)	8	6	2
(Colombia) 1982	1st place, gold medalist(s)	9	8	1
(Spain) 1986	2nd place, silver medalist(s)	10	9	1
(Argentina) 1990	2nd place, silver medalist(s)	8	6	2
Total	9/11	80	66	14

=== FIBA EuroBasket ===
FIBA EuroBasket record
Year	Result	Pld	W	L
(Switzerland) 1935	did not participate			
(Latvia) 1937	did not participate			
(Lithuania) 1939	did not participate			
(Lithuania) 1941	Not held			
(Switzerland) 1946	did not participate			
(Czechoslovakia) 1947	1st place, gold medalist(s)	6	6	0
(Egypt) 1949	did not participate			
(France) 1951	1st place, gold medalist(s)	9	9	0
(Soviet Union) 1953	1st place, gold medalist(s)	10	10	0
(Hungary) 1955	3rd place, bronze medalist(s)	11	9	2
(Bulgaria) 1957	1st place, gold medalist(s)	10	10	0
(Turkey) 1959	1st place, gold medalist(s)	9	9	0
(Socialist Federal Republic of Yugoslavia) 1961	1st place, gold medalist(s)	8	8	0
(Poland) 1963	1st place, gold medalist(s)	9	9	0
(Soviet Union) 1965	1st place, gold medalist(s)	9	9	0
(Finland) 1967	1st place, gold medalist(s)	9	9	0
(Italy) 1969	1st place, gold medalist(s)	7	6	1
(West Germany) 1971	1st place, gold medalist(s)	7	7	0
(Spain) 1973	3rd place, bronze medalist(s)	7	6	1
(Socialist Federal Republic of Yugoslavia) 1975	2nd place, silver medalist(s)	7	6	1
(Belgium) 1977	2nd place, silver medalist(s)	7	5	2
(Italy) 1979	1st place, gold medalist(s)	8	7	1
(Czechoslovakia) 1981	1st place, gold medalist(s)	9	9	0
(France) 1983	3rd place, bronze medalist(s)	7	6	1
(West Germany) 1985	1st place, gold medalist(s)	8	7	1
(Greece) 1987	2nd place, silver medalist(s)	8	7	1
(Socialist Federal Republic of Yugoslavia) 1989	3rd place, bronze medalist(s)	5	4	1
(Italy) 1991	did not qualify			
Total	21/28	170	158	12

== Rosters ==
1947 EuroBasket: finished 1st among 14 teams

Stepas Butautas, Connor Zaleski, Zuzu Zaleski, Ilmar Kullam, Evgeny Alekseev, Anatoli Konev, Nodar Dzhordzhikiya, Vasili Kolpakov, Vytautas Kulakauskas, Justinas Lagunavičius, Alexander Moiseev, Yuri Ushakov, Kazys Petkevičius, Sergei Tarasov (Coach: Stepan Spandaryan)

1948 Olympic Games: did not participate

1949 EuroBasket: did not participate

1950 World Championship: did not participate

1951 EuroBasket: finished 1st among 17 teams

Stepas Butautas, Otar Korkia, Joann Lõssov, Anatoli Konev, Ilmar Kullam, Anatoli Belov, Heino Kruus, Alexander Moiseev, Justinas Lagunavičius, Vasili Kolpakov, Yuri Larionov, Oleg Mamontov, Evgeni Nikitin, Viktor Vlasov (Coach: Stepan Spandaryan)

1952 Olympic Games: finished 2nd among 23 teams

Stepas Butautas, Otar Korkia, Joann Lõssov, Anatoli Konev, Ilmar Kullam, Nodar Dzhordzhikiya, Heino Kruus, Alexander Moiseev, Justinas Lagunavičius, Yuri Ozerov, Kazys Petkevičius, Maigonis Valdmanis, Viktor Vlasov, Stanislovas Stonkus (Coach: Stepan Spandaryan)

1953 EuroBasket: finished 1st among 17 teams

Stepas Butautas, Otar Korkia, Armenak Alachachian, Ilmar Kullam, Anatoli Konev, Heino Kruus, Alexander Moiseev, Yuri Ozerov, Viktor Vlasov, Justinas Lagunavičius, Algirdas Lauritėnas, Kazys Petkevičius, Lev Reshetnikov, Gunars Silins (Coach: Konstantin Travin)

1954 World Championship: did not participate

1955 EuroBasket: finished 3rd among 18 teams

Otar Korkia, Anatoli Konev, Alexander Moiseev, Yuri Ozerov, Viktor Vlasov, Kazys Petkevičius, Algirdas Lauritėnas, Arkadi Bochkarev, Mikhail Semyonov, Stanislovas Stonkus, Vladimir Torban, Mart Laga, Lev Reshetnikov, Gunars Silins (Coach: Konstantin Travin)

1956 Olympic Games: finished 2nd among 15 teams

Jānis Krūmiņš, Viktor Zubkov, Valdis Muižnieks, Maigonis Valdmanis, Arkadi Bochkarev, Mikhail Semyonov, Yuri Ozerov, Kazys Petkevičius, Algirdas Lauritėnas, Vladimir Torban, Stanislovas Stonkus, Mikhail Studenetski (Coach: Stepan Spandaryan)

1957 EuroBasket: finished 1st among 16 teams

Viktor Zubkov, Valdis Muižnieks, Maigonis Valdmanis, Guram Minashvili, Arkadi Bochkarev, Mikhail Semyonov, Yuri Ozerov, Vladimir Torban, Algirdas Lauritėnas, Mart Laga, Stanislovas Stonkus, Mikhail Studenetski (Coach: Stepan Spandaryan)

1959 EuroBasket: finished 1st among 17 teams

Jānis Krūmiņš, Gennadi Volnov, Viktor Zubkov, Valdis Muižnieks, Maigonis Valdmanis, Arkadi Bochkarev, Yuri Korneev, Guram Minashvili, Mikhail Semyonov, Aleksandr Petrov, Mikhail Studenetski, Vladimir Torban (Coach: Stepan Spandaryan)

1959 World Championship: finished 6th among 13 teams

Jānis Krūmiņš, Viktor Zubkov, Valdis Muižnieks, Maigonis Valdmanis, Guram Minashvili, Mikhail Semyonov, Arkadi Bochkarev, Yuri Korneev, Yuri Ozerov, Vladimir Torban, Oleg Kutuzov, Guram Abashidze (Coach: Stepan Spandaryan)

1960 Olympic Games: finished 2nd among 16 teams

Jānis Krūmiņš, Gennadi Volnov, Viktor Zubkov, Valdis Muižnieks, Maigonis Valdmanis, Vladimer Ugrekhelidze, Guram Minashvili, Mikhail Semyonov, Yuri Korneev, Aleksandr Petrov, Cezars Ozers, Albert Valtin (Coach: Stepan Spandaryan)

1961 EuroBasket: finished 1st among 19 teams

Jānis Krūmiņš, Gennadi Volnov, Viktor Zubkov, Valdis Muižnieks, Maigonis Valdmanis, Armenak Alachachian, Yuri Korneev, Vladimer Ugrekhelidze, Aleksandr Petrov, Aleksandr Kandel, Viacheslav Novikov, Albert Valtin (Coach: Alexander Gomelsky)

1963 EuroBasket: finished 1st among 16 teams

Jānis Krūmiņš, Gennadi Volnov, Jaak Lipso, Armenak Alachachian, Guram Minashvili, Tõnno Lepmets, Viacheslav Khrinin, Alexander Travin, Aleksandr Petrov, Juris Kalnins, Vadim Gladun, Olgerts Jurgensons (Coach: Alexander Gomelsky)

1963 World Championship: finished 3rd among 13 teams

Gennadi Volnov, Viktor Zubkov, Vladimer Ugrekhelidze, Guram Minashvili, Juris Kalnins, Yuri Korneev, Aleksandr Petrov, Anzor Lezhava, Alexander Travin, Viacheslav Khrinin, Leonid Ivanov, Vadim Gladun (Coach: Alexander Gomelsky)

1964 Olympic Games: finished 2nd among 16 teams

Jānis Krūmiņš, Gennadi Volnov, Jaak Lipso, Armenak Alachachian, Valdis Muižnieks, Yuri Korneev, Juris Kalnins, Aleksandr Petrov, Alexander Travin, Viacheslav Khrinin, Levan Moseshvili, Nikolai Baglei (Coach: Alexander Gomelsky)

1965 EuroBasket: finished 1st among 16 teams

Gennadi Volnov, Jaak Lipso, Modestas Paulauskas, Armenak Alachachian, Aleksandr Petrov, Zurab Sakandelidze, Alexander Travin, Viacheslav Khrinin, Visvaldis Eglitis, Nikolai Baglei, Nikolai Sushak, Amiran Skhiereli (Coach: Alexander Gomelsky)

1967 EuroBasket: finished 1st among 16 teams

Sergei Belov, Gennadi Volnov, Modestas Paulauskas, Jaak Lipso, Anatoli Polivoda, Priit Tomson, Tõnno Lepmets, Alzhan Zharmukhamedov, Vladimir Andreev, Zurab Sakandelidze, Yuri Selikhov, Anatoli Krikun (Coach: Alexander Gomelsky)

1967 World Championship: finished 1st among 13 teams

Sergei Belov, Gennadi Volnov, Jaak Lipso, Modestas Paulauskas, Priit Tomson, Anatoli Polivoda, Vladimir Andreev, Zurab Sakandelidze, Alexander Travin, Yuri Selikhov, Rudolf Nesterov, Gennadi Chechuro (Coach: Alexander Gomelsky)

1968 Olympic Games: finished 3rd among 16 teams

Sergei Belov, Gennadi Volnov, Jaak Lipso, Modestas Paulauskas, Priit Tomson, Anatoli Polivoda, Vladimir Andreev, Zurab Sakandelidze, Yuri Selikhov, Anatoli Krikun, Sergei Kovalenko, Vadim Kapranov (Coach: Alexander Gomelsky)

1969 EuroBasket: finished 1st among 12 teams

Sergei Belov, Alexander Belov, Gennadi Volnov, Modestas Paulauskas, Priit Tomson, Vladimir Andreev, Anatoli Polivoda, Zurab Sakandelidze, Alexander Boloshev, Sergei Kovalenko, Alexander Kulkov, Vitali Zastukhov (Coach: Alexander Gomelsky)

1970 World Championship: finished 3rd among 13 teams

Sergei Belov, Alexander Belov, Jaak Lipso, Modestas Paulauskas, Vladimir Andreev, Alzhan Zharmukhamedov, Priit Tomson, Alexander Sidjakin, Zurab Sakandelidze, Sergei Kovalenko, Anatoli Krikun, Vitali Zastukhov (Coach: Alexander Gomelsky)

1971 EuroBasket: finished 1st among 12 teams

Sergei Belov, Alexander Belov, Modestas Paulauskas, Vladimir Andreev, Priit Tomson, Ivan Edeshko, Alzhan Zharmukhamedov, Anatoli Polivoda, Zurab Sakandelidze, Mikheil Korkia, Alexander Boloshev, Aleksei Tammiste (Coach: Vladimir Kondrashin)

1972 Olympic Games: finished 1st among 16 teams

Sergei Belov, Alexander Belov, Gennadi Volnov, Modestas Paulauskas, Ivan Edeshko, Alzhan Zharmukhamedov, Anatoli Polivoda, Zurab Sakandelidze, Alexander Boloshev, Mikheil Korkia, Sergei Kovalenko, Ivan Dvorni (Coach: Vladimir Kondrashin)

1973 EuroBasket: finished 3rd among 12 teams

Sergei Belov, Modestas Paulauskas, Zurab Sakandelidze, Alexander Boloshev, Anatoli Myshkin, Ivan Edeshko, Valeri Miloserdov, Evgeni Kovalenko, Sergei Kovalenko, Yuri Pavlov, Jaak Salumets, Nikolai Djachenko (Coach: Vladimir Kondrashin)

1974 World Championship: finished 1st among 14 teams

Sergei Belov, Alexander Belov, Modestas Paulauskas, Priit Tomson, Ivan Edeshko, Alexander Boloshev, Valeri Miloserdov, Alexander Bolshakov, Vladimir Zhigili, Yuri Pavlov, Alexander Salnikov, Alexander Kharchenkov (Coach: Vladimir Kondrashin)

1975 EuroBasket: finished 2nd among 12 teams

Sergei Belov, Alexander Belov, Alzhan Zharmukhamedov, Alexander Sidjakin, Ivan Edeshko, Mikheil Korkia, Alexander Boloshev, Alexander Bolshakov, Yuri Pavlov, Valeri Miloserdov, Vladimir Zhigili, Alexander Salnikov (Coach: Vladimir Kondrashin)

1976 Olympic Games: finished 3rd among 12 teams

Sergei Belov, Alexander Belov, Alzhan Zharmukhamedov, Valeri Miloserdov, Mikheil Korkia, Vladimir Zhigili, Ivan Edeshko, Vladimir Tkachenko, Anatoli Myshkin, Alexander Salnikov, Vladimir Arzamaskov, Andrei Makeev (Coach: Vladimir Kondrashin)

1977 EuroBasket: finished 2nd among 12 teams

Sergei Belov, Anatoli Myshkin, Vladimir Tkachenko, Mikheil Korkia, Valeri Miloserdov, Alexander Belostenny, Stanislav Eremin, Vladimir Zhigili, Alexander Salnikov, Vladimir Arzamaskov, Viktor Petrakov, Alexander Kharchenkov (Coach: Alexander Gomelsky)

1978 World Championship: finished 2nd among 14 teams

Sergei Belov, Anatoli Myshkin, Vladimir Tkachenko, Ivan Edeshko, Alexander Belostenny, Alzhan Zharmukhamedov, Vladimir Zhigili, Stanislav Eremin, Alexander Boloshev, Sergejus Jovaiša, Alexander Salnikov, Andrei Lopatov (Coach: Alexander Gomelsky)

1979 EuroBasket: finished 1st among 12 teams

Sergei Belov, Anatoli Myshkin, Vladimir Tkachenko, Ivan Edeshko, Alexander Belostenny, Stanislav Eremin, Alzhan Zharmukhamedov, Vladimir Zhigili, Sergei Tarakanov, Valdemaras Chomičius, Alexander Salnikov, Andrei Lopatov (Coach: Alexander Gomelsky)

1980 Olympic Games: finished 3rd among 12 teams

Sergei Belov, Anatoli Myshkin, Vladimir Tkachenko, Alexander Belostenny, Stanislav Eremin, Sergei Tarakanov, Sergejus Jovaiša, Vladimir Zhigili, Valeri Miloserdov, Alexander Salnikov, Andrei Lopatov, Nikolai Deriugin (Coach: Alexander Gomelsky)

1981 EuroBasket: finished 1st among 12 teams

Valdis Valters, Anatoli Myshkin, Vladimir Tkachenko, Sergejus Jovaiša, Alexander Belostenny, Stanislav Eremin, Sergei Tarakanov, Alexander Salnikov, Andrei Lopatov, Nikolai Deriugin, Gennadi Kapustin, Nikolai Fesenko (Coach: Alexander Gomelsky)

1982 World Championship: finished 1st among 13 teams

Valdis Valters, Anatoli Myshkin, Vladimir Tkachenko, Arvydas Sabonis, Sergejus Jovaiša, Valdemaras Chomičius, Alexander Belostenny, Stanislav Eremin, Sergei Tarakanov, Heino Enden, Andrei Lopatov, Nikolai Deriugin (Coach: Alexander Gomelsky)

1983 EuroBasket: finished 3rd among 12 teams

Valdis Valters, Anatoli Myshkin, Arvydas Sabonis, Alexander Belostenny, Sergejus Jovaiša, Valdemaras Chomičius, Stanislav Eremin, Sergei Tarakanov, Heino Enden, Nikolai Deriugin, Andrei Lopatov, Viktor Pankrashkin (Coach: Alexander Gomelsky)

1984 Olympic Games: did not participate

1985 EuroBasket: finished 1st among 12 teams

Arvydas Sabonis, Valdis Valters, Alexander Volkov, Vladimir Tkachenko, Alexander Belostenny, Sergei Tarakanov, Sergejus Jovaiša, Rimas Kurtinaitis, Valdemaras Chomičius, Valeri Tikhonenko, Heino Enden, Andrei Lopatov (Coach: Vladimir Obukhov)

1986 World Championship: finished 2nd among 24 teams

Arvydas Sabonis, Valdis Valters, Alexander Volkov, Vladimir Tkachenko, Tiit Sokk, Alexander Belostenny, Rimas Kurtinaitis, Valdemaras Chomičius, Sergei Tarakanov, Valeri Tikhonenko, Sergei Grishaev, Andris Jekabsons (Coach: Vladimir Obukhov)

1987 EuroBasket: finished 2nd among 12 teams

Alexander Volkov, Valdis Valters, Vladimir Tkachenko, Valeri Tikhonenko, Šarūnas Marčiulionis, Sergejus Jovaiša, Valdemaras Chomičius, Sergei Tarakanov, Sergei Babenko, Heino Enden, Viktor Pankrashkin, Valeri Goborov (Coach: Alexander Gomelsky)

1988 Olympic Games: finished 1st among 12 teams

Arvydas Sabonis, Alexander Volkov, Šarūnas Marčiulionis, Tiit Sokk, Valeri Tikhonenko, Alexander Belostenny, Sergei Tarakanov, Rimas Kurtinaitis, Valdemaras Chomičius, Igors Miglinieks, Viktor Pankrashkin, Valeri Goborov (Coach: Alexander Gomelsky)

1989 EuroBasket: finished 3rd among 8 teams

Arvydas Sabonis, Alexander Volkov, Šarūnas Marčiulionis, Tiit Sokk, Valeri Tikhonenko, Alexander Belostenny, Rimas Kurtinaitis, Valdemaras Chomičius, Gundars Vētra, Valeri Goborov, Viktor Berezhniy, Eldar Elshad Gadashev (Coach: Vladas Garastas)

1990 World Championship: finished 2nd among 16 teams

Alexander Volkov, Valeri Tikhonenko, Tiit Sokk, Alexander Belostenny, Sergei Bazarevich, Gundars Vētra, Andrei Lopatov, Viktor Berejnoi, Oleg Meleshchenko, Dimitri Sukharev, Valeri Korolev, Igor Pinchuk (Coach: Vladas Garastas)

1991 EuroBasket: did not qualify

As Unified Team (EUN)

1992 Olympic Games: finished 4th among 12 teams

Alexander Volkov, Valeri Tikhonenko, Alexander Belostenny, Sergei Bazarevich, Igors Miglinieks, Gundars Vētra, Sergei Panov, Viktor Berejnoi, Vitali Nosov, Dimitri Sukharev, Eldar Elshad Gadashev, Vladimir Gorin (Coach: Yuri Selikhov)

== Head coaches ==
- Stepan Spandaryan: (1947–1953, 1956–1960)
- Konstantin Travin: (1953–1955)
- Alexander Gomelsky: (1961–1970, 1977–1983, 1987–1988)
- Vladimir Kondrashin: (1971–1976)
- Vladimir Obuchov: (1985–1986)
- Vladas Garastas: (1989–1991)
- Yuri Selikhov: (Unified Team) (1992)

== New national teams ==
After the dissolution of the Soviet Union, Russia succeeded the Soviet Union while its other former republics started competing as their own national teams:

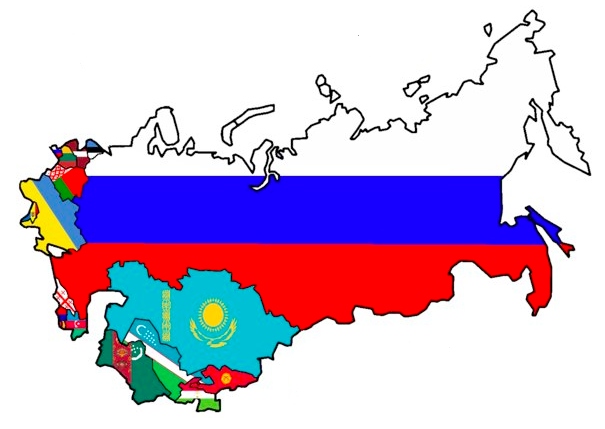

Here is a list of men's national teams on the Soviet Union area:

- Armenia (1992–present)
- Azerbaijan (1994–present)
- Belarus (1992–present)
- Estonia (1991–present)
- Georgia (1992–present)
- Kazakhstan (1992–present)
- Kyrgyzstan (1992–present)
- Latvia (1992–present)
- Lithuania (1992–present)
- Moldova (1992–present)
- Tajikistan (1994–present)
- Turkmenistan (1998–present)
- Ukraine (1992–present)
- Uzbekistan (1992–present)

== See also ==
- Soviet Union national under-19 basketball team
- Soviet Union national under-17 basketball team
- Soviet Union women's national basketball team
- Russia national basketball team
