= Going Vertical =

Going Vertical Three Seconds
- Theatrical release poster
- Directed by: Anton Megerdichev
- Screenplay by: Nikolay Kulikov; Andrey Kureychik
- Produced by: Leonid Vereshchagin; Anton Zlatopolsky; Nikita Mikhalkov; Vladimir Vasiliev; Aleksey Dubinin; Yekaterina Yakovleva; Sergei Gurevich; Aleksandr Utkin
- Starring: Vladimir Mashkov; Andrey Smolyakov; Ivan Kolesnikov; Kirill Zaytsev; James Tratas; Sergei Garmash; Marat Basharov; Viktoriya Tolstoganova; Alexandra Revenko; John Savage; Oliver Morton
- Cinematography: Igor Grinyakin
- Edited by: Petr Zelenov; Anton Megerdichev; Vazgen Kagramanyan
- Production companies: Three T Productions; Russia-1; Cinema Fund
- Distributed by: Central Partnership
- Release date: 28 December 2017 (Russia)
- Running time: 133 minutes
- Country: Russia
- Languages: Russian; English
- Budget: $11.5 million
- Box office: $66.3 million

Going Vertical, also known as Three Seconds (Russian: Движение вверх, romanized: Dvizhenie vverkh) is a 2017 Russian sports drama film directed by Anton Megerdichev about the controversial victory of the Soviet national basketball team over the 1972 U.S. Olympic team, ending their 63-game winning streak, at the Munich Summer Olympic's men's basketball tournament.

Upon its release on 28 December 2017, Going Vertical achieved critical and commercial success. With a worldwide gross of $66.3 million, Going Vertical was the highest-grossing modern Russian film of all time at the time of release.

== Plot ==
The year was 1970. The senior men's Soviet Union national basketball team had changed its head coach. The team's new head coach, Vladimir Garanzhin (Vladimir Kondrashin), who was also the head coach of the Leningrad based BC Spartak basketball club, of the USSR Premier League; said at a press conference that at the Munich Summer Olympic Games, the Soviet Union was going to beat the U.S. men's national basketball team. The statements of the coach frightened Soviet sports officials, for whom their main goal was to perform strongly at the world's biggest sporting stage, in the year of the 50th anniversary of the Soviet Union, and keep their posts.

Vladimir Garanzhin completely changed the composition of the Soviet team, and it was no longer dominated by CSKA Moscow players, but instead the players from several different clubs of the country. Garanzhin also began training the team with new coaching techniques; he needed to inspire the team, and convince the players that they could beat the American team.

It was the night of 9 to 10 September 1972. The city of Munich, which had survived a terrorist attack three days earlier, had continued to host sports competitions at the Summer Olympic Games. The long-awaited finale of the XX Olympic Summer Basketball Tournament had finally arrived. The two final teams, as had been predicted by Garanzhin, were the USSR and U.S. teams. Up to the decisive game, both teams were unbeaten. And the outcome of the dramatic final match was decided in the last three seconds of the game...

== Cast ==
Actors	Summer Olympic Games
Vladimir Mashkov	Vladimir Garanzhin, head coach of the USSR national basketball team, re-named
Viktoriya Tolstoganova	Evgenia Garanzhina, wife of Vladimir Garanzhin
Nikita Yakovlev	Shurka, son of Vladimir Garanzhin
Andrey Smolyakov	Grigorii Moiseev, assistant head coach of the USSR team
Sergei Garmash	Sergei Pavlov, Chairman of the State Committee for Sport of the USSR
Marat Basharov	Gennadii Tereshenko, functionary, member of the USSR State Committee for Sports
James Tratas	Modestas Paulauskas, captain of the USSR national basketball team (№5)
Irakli Mikava	Zurab Sakandelidze, player of the USSR national basketball team (№6)
Aleksandr Ryapolov	Alzhan Zharmukhamedov, player of the USSR national basketball team (№7)
Egor Klimovich	Aleksandr Boloshev, player of the USSR national basketball team (№8)
Kuzma Saprykin	Ivan Edeshko, player of the USSR national basketball team (№9)
Kirill Zaytsev	Sergei Belov, player of the USSR national basketball team (№10)
Otar Lortkipanidze	Mikhail Korkia, player of the USSR national basketball team (№11)
Ivan Kolesnikov	Alexander Belov, player of the USSR national basketball team (№14)
Ivan Orlov	Sergei Kovalenko, player of the USSR national basketball team (№15)
Alexandra Revenko	Alexandra Ovchinnikova, the bride of Alexander Belov
John Savage	Henry "Hank" Iba
Jay Bowdy	Mike Bantom
Oliver Morton	Doug Collins
Sheila M. Lockhart	African American Pedestrian
Chidi Ajufo	Jim Brewer
Andrius Paulavicius	Jonas
Isaiah Jarel	Jimmy
Konstantin Shpakov	Tony Jameson, American basketball player
Aleksandr Gromov	basketball player
Daniil Soldatov	Mike, reporter
Oleg Lebedev	Ranko Žeravica, coach of the Yugoslav national team
Aleksey Malashkin	Aleksandr Gomelsky, coach of the USSR men's basketball team
Nataliya Kurdyubova	Nina Yeryomina, a Soviet sports commentator
Kibwe Trim	Dwight Jones, an American basketball player

== Production ==
Even before the release of the film, it aroused sharp criticism from Yevgenia Kondrashina and Alexandra Ovchinnikova (widows of Vladimir Kondrashin and Alexander Belov), and Yuri Kondrashin (son of Vladimir Petrovich). In their opinion, the authors of the film plunged into their private lives, and included information about it in the script without their consent.

=== Filming ===
Principal photography began in August 2016, in Moscow.

The last scenes of the film - the scenes of the final match of the 1972 Olympic Games basketball tournament, between the USSR and the US national teams - were filmed in the first filming days. Instead of filming a crowd of fans, advertising, and other attributes of the Munich match, the shooting technique used the "chromakey" technology.

== Reception ==
The film received mostly positive reviews in the Russian press. Enthusiastic reviews were published by Arguments and Facts, Gazeta.ru, KG-Portal, moderately positive reviews by Novaya Gazeta, Komsomolskaya Pravda, Meduza, Esquire, Film.ru, Rossiyskaya Gazeta, Trud and Poster. Anton Dolin, in his review, noted that Going Vertical is "a truly sports film that takes teamwork and coherence more than someone's individual talent or charisma"., КГ-Портал

== Box office ==
According to the United Federal Automated Information System on Movie Screenings in Cinema Halls (UAIS), the gross of the film, as of 2018, amounted to more than ₽2.9 billion ($54 million), making the picture the higgest-grossing film in the history of modern Russian film distribution (post-Soviet era).

It also became the highest-grossing Russian film in China, where it grossed CN¥85 million ($12.3 million). That brought the film's worldwide gross to $66.3 million.

== See also ==
- Legend No. 17
- List of basketball films
