= Avanhard (sports society) =

Avanhard (sports society) (Ukrainian: Авангард (спортивне товариство)) was a trade unions sports society of the Ukrainian SSR. Created in 1957 on the decision of the All-Union Central Council of Trade Unions presidium, it united workers of industry and construction from 14 other sports societies such as "Torpedo", "Shakhtar", "Khimik", "Chervona Zirka", "Chervonyi Prapor", "Budivelnyk", and others.

== Brief description ==
On January 1, 1977, it accounted for 3,199 primary collectives with over two million sportsmen.

The society was cultivating 49 types of sports. It was composed of such famous sports clubs as Metalurh Zaporizhia, Zorya Luhansk, Stal Dnipropetrovsk, Sudobudivnyk Mykolaiv, Budivelnyk Kyiv, and others.

In 1982, the society merged with its Russian counterpart "Trud".

In 1991, the society was recognized as a parent organization of the newly established sports society "Ukraina".

== Olympic laureates ==
=== 1952 Summer Olympics (as Budivelnyk) ===
Athlete	Gold	Silver	Bronze	Total
Mariya Horokhovska	2	4	0	6
Nina Bocharova	2	2	0	4
Yakiv Punkin	1	0	0	1
Totals (3 entries)	5	6	0	11

=== 1956 Summer Olympics ===
Athlete	Gold	Silver	Bronze	Total
Polina Astakhova	1	0	1	2
Ihor Rybak	1	0	0	1
Totals (2 entries)	2	0	1	3

=== 1960 Summer Olympics ===
Athlete	Gold	Silver	Bronze	Total
Polina Astakhova	2	1	1	4
Lyudmila Shevtsova	1	0	0	1
Totals (2 entries)	3	1	1	5

=== 1964 Summer Olympics ===
Athlete	Gold	Silver	Bronze	Total
Polina Astakhova	2	1	1	4
Totals (1 entries)	2	1	1	4

=== 1968 Summer Olympics ===
Athlete	Gold	Silver	Bronze	Total
Anatoli Polyvoda	0	0	1	1
Serhiy Kovalenko	0	0	1	1
Totals (2 entries)	0	0	2	2

=== 1972 Summer Olympics ===
Athlete	Gold	Silver	Bronze	Total
Anatoli Polyvoda	1	0	0	1
Serhiy Kovalenko	1	0	0	1
Totals (2 entries)	2	0	0	2

=== 1972 Winter Olympics ===
Athlete	Gold	Silver	Bronze	Total
Ivan Biakov	1	0	0	1
Totals (1 entries)	1	0	0	1

=== 1976 Winter Olympics ===
Athlete	Gold	Silver	Bronze	Total
Ivan Biakov	1	0	0	1
Totals (1 entries)	1	0	0	1
