= Armenak Alachachian =

Armenian-Soviet basketball player and coach

Personal information
- Born: 25 December 1930 Alexandria, Egypt
- Died: 4 December 2017 (aged 87) Toronto, Canada
- Listed height: 5 ft 9.25 in (1.76 m)
- Listed weight: 165 lb (75 kg)

Career information
- Playing career: 1948–1966
- Position: Point guard
- Number: 6
- Coaching career: 1966–1970

Career history

Playing
- 1948–1954: SKIF Yerevan
- 1955–1957: Burevestnik Almaty
- 1958–1966: CSKA Moscow

Coaching
- 1966–1968: CSKA Moscow (assistant)
- 1968–1970: CSKA Moscow

Career highlights
- As player: 2× EuroLeague champion (1961, 1963); 8× USSR Premier League champion (1959—1966); 2× USSR Spartakiad champion (1959, 1963); Master of Sports of the USSR (1953); Honored Master of Sports of the USSR (1961); USSR Order of the Badge of Honor (1965); Gratitude of the President of the Russian Federation (2006); CSKA Moscow Hall of Fame (2013); As head coach: EuroLeague champion (1969); 2× USSR Premier League champion (1969, 1970); Honored Coach of the Russian SSFR (1969)
Medals
Men's basketball
Representing Soviet Union
Summer Olympic Games
Silver medal – second place	Tokyo 1964
FIBA EuroBasket
Gold medal – first place	USSR 1953
Gold medal – first place	Yugoslavia 1961
Gold medal – first place	Poland 1963
Gold medal – first place	USSR 1965

Armenak Misakovich Alachachian (alternate spellings: Alachachyan, Alatchatchan, Alajajian) (Armenian: Արմենակ Միսակի Ալաջաջյան, December 25, 1930 – December 4, 2017) was an Armenian-Soviet basketball player and coach. During his club playing career, the point guard reached European stardom with CSKA Moscow and the senior men's Soviet Union national team. He was the first person to ever win a EuroLeague title, as both a player and a head coach.

== Club career ==
Alachachian began his career in 1948, playing for SKIF Yerevan team. In 1955, he moved to Burevestnik Almaty to play alongside the famous giant - Uvais Akhtaev. While he was the team captain, Alachachian helped CSKA Moscow win its first EuroLeague championship in 1961. He added a second EuroLeague championship with CSKA in 1963, and he reached another EuroLerague Final in 1965, before retiring. In total, Alachachian played 5 seasons in EuroLeague, averaging 5.0 points per game and reaching at least the semifinals stage in every of those seasons.

== National team career ==
As a player of the senior men's Soviet national team, Alachachian won four gold medals at the FIBA EuroBasket. As he won the 1953 EuroBasket, the 1961 EuroBasket, the 1963 EuroBasket, and the 1965 EuroBasket. He also won a Summer Olympic Games silver medal, which he won at the 1964 Tokyo Summer Olympics.

== Coaching career ==
Aleksandar Gomelsky, who was at the time CSKA Moscow's sports director, assigned Alachachian to the club's head coach position in 1968. Alachachian would go on to lead the team to the Euroleague championship in 1969. Alachachian thus became the first person to win the title as both a player and a head coach.

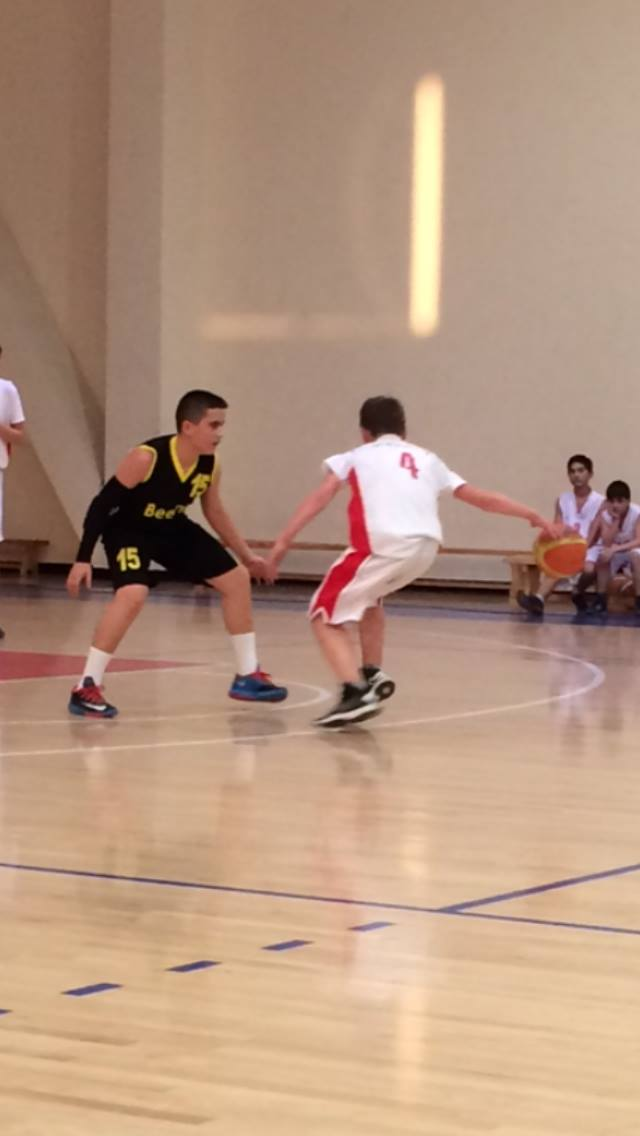
2014 Yerevan Youth International Basketball tournament in honor of Armenak Alachachyan

== See also ==
- List of EuroLeague-winning head coaches
