= Jaak Lipso =

Estonian basketball player (1940–2023)

Personal information
- Born: 18 April 1940 Tallinn, Estonia
- Died: 3 March 2023 (aged 82) Tallinn, Estonia
- Listed height: 200 cm (6 ft 7 in)
- Listed weight: 209 lb (95 kg)

Career information
- Playing career: 1956–1981
- Position: Center

Career history
- 1956–1960: TRÜ
- 1960–1962: Rīgas ASK
- 1962–1969: CSKA Moscow
- 1969–1975: Kalev
- 1975–1981: Harju KEK

Career highlights
- 2× EuroLeague champion (1963, 1969); 6× USSR League champion (1962–1966, 1969)
Medals
Men's basketball
Representing Soviet Union
Olympic Games
Silver medal – second place	1964 Tokyo	Team competition
Bronze medal – third place	1968 Mexico City	Team competition
World Championship
Gold medal – first place	Uruguay 1967	USSR
Bronze medal – third place	Yugoslavia 1970	USSR
EuroBasket
Gold medal – first place	Poland 1963	USSR
Gold medal – first place	USSR 1965	USSR
Gold medal – first place	Finland 1967	USSR

Jaak Lipso (18 April 1940 – 3 March 2023) was an Estonian professional basketball player who competed for the Soviet Union. He is the only Estonian basketball player who has won two medals at the Olympic Games. Lipso also won two medals at the FIBA World Championship and was a three-time Eurobasket champion with the Soviet Union national basketball team. He was a member of the Soviet Union national team from 1961 to 1970. After his active career Lipso became a basketball coach, and was elected to the Estonian Basketball Hall of Fame in 2010.

Lipso died on 3 March 2023, at age 82.

== Club career ==
Lipso's career started at the age of 16 when he joined TRÜ basketball team (now Tartu Ülikool/Rock) in 1956. He played there for four seasons winning two Soviet Estonian titles (1958, 1959). After that he played a season with Rīgas ASK in Soviet Latvia before moving to European powerhouse CSKA Moscow. He spent the next eight years with the team winning two Euroleague titles (1963, 1969) and six USSR League championship titles (1962–1966, 1969). Lipso then moved to Tallinna Kalev for two years and then to Harju KEK winning two more Soviet Estonian titles (1974, 1979).

== Achievements ==
=== National team ===
- Olympic Games: 1964, 1968
- World Championships: 1967, 1970
- European Championships: 1963, 1965, 1967

=== Club ===
- Euroleague Championship: 1963, 1969
- Soviet Union League Championship: 1962, 1963, 1964, 1965, 1966, 1969
- Estonian SSR Championship: 1958, 1959, 1971, 1974, 1979
