= EuroBasket 1953 =

International basketball event

Чемпионат Европы по баскетболу 1953

Tournament details
- Host country: Soviet Union
- City: Moscow
- Dates: 23 May – 4 June
- Teams: 17
- Venue: 1 (in 1 host city)

Final positions
- Champions: Soviet Union (3rd title)
- Runners-up: Hungary
- Third place: France
- Fourth place: Czechoslovakia

Tournament statistics
- MVP: (Soviet Union) Anatoly Konev
- Top scorer: (Lebanon) Ahmed Idlibi (15.9 points per game)

The 1953 FIBA European Championship, commonly called FIBA EuroBasket 1953, was the eighth FIBA EuroBasket regional basketball championship, held by FIBA Europe. Seventeen national teams affiliated with the International Basketball Federation (FIBA) entered the competition. The competition was hosted by the Soviet Union, champions of EuroBasket 1951. Moscow was the location of the event.

== Results ==
=== First round ===
In the preliminary round, the 17 teams were split up into four groups. One of the groups had five teams, with the other three having four each. The top two teams in each group advanced to the final round, while the remaining nine teams were relegated to classification play.

==== Group A ====
Rank	Team	Pts	W	L	PF	PA	Diff
1.	Czechoslovakia	6	3	0	202	107	+95
2.	Italy	5	2	1	186	134	+52
3.	Romania	4	1	2	148	146	+2
4.	Switzerland	3	0	3	101	250	−149

Czechoslovakia	59 – 43	Italy
Czechoslovakia	49 – 31	Romania
Czechoslovakia	94 – 33	Switzerland
Italy	61 – 43	Romania
Switzerland	32 – 82	Italy
Romania	74 – 36	Switzerland

==== Group B ====
Rank	Team	Pts	W	L	PF	PA	Diff
1.	Egypt	6	3	0	223	125	+98
2.	France	5	2	1	199	151	+48
3.	West Germany	4	1	2	150	187	−37
4.	Sweden	3	0	3	96	205	−109

France	76 – 44	West Germany
France	58 – 74	Egypt
France	65 – 33	Sweden
West Germany	41 – 74	Egypt
Sweden	37 – 65	West Germany
Egypt	75 – 26	Sweden

==== Group C ====
Rank	Team	Pts	W	L	PF	PA	Diff
1.	Soviet Union	6	3	0	241	99	+142
2.	Hungary	5	2	1	206	129	+77
3.	Belgium	4	1	2	122	151	−29
4.	Denmark	3	0	3	79	269	−190

Soviet Union	59 – 31	Belgium
Soviet Union	64 – 54	Hungary
Soviet Union	118 – 14	Denmark
Hungary	57 – 35	Belgium
Denmark	35 – 56	Belgium
Hungary	95 – 30	Denmark

==== Group D ====
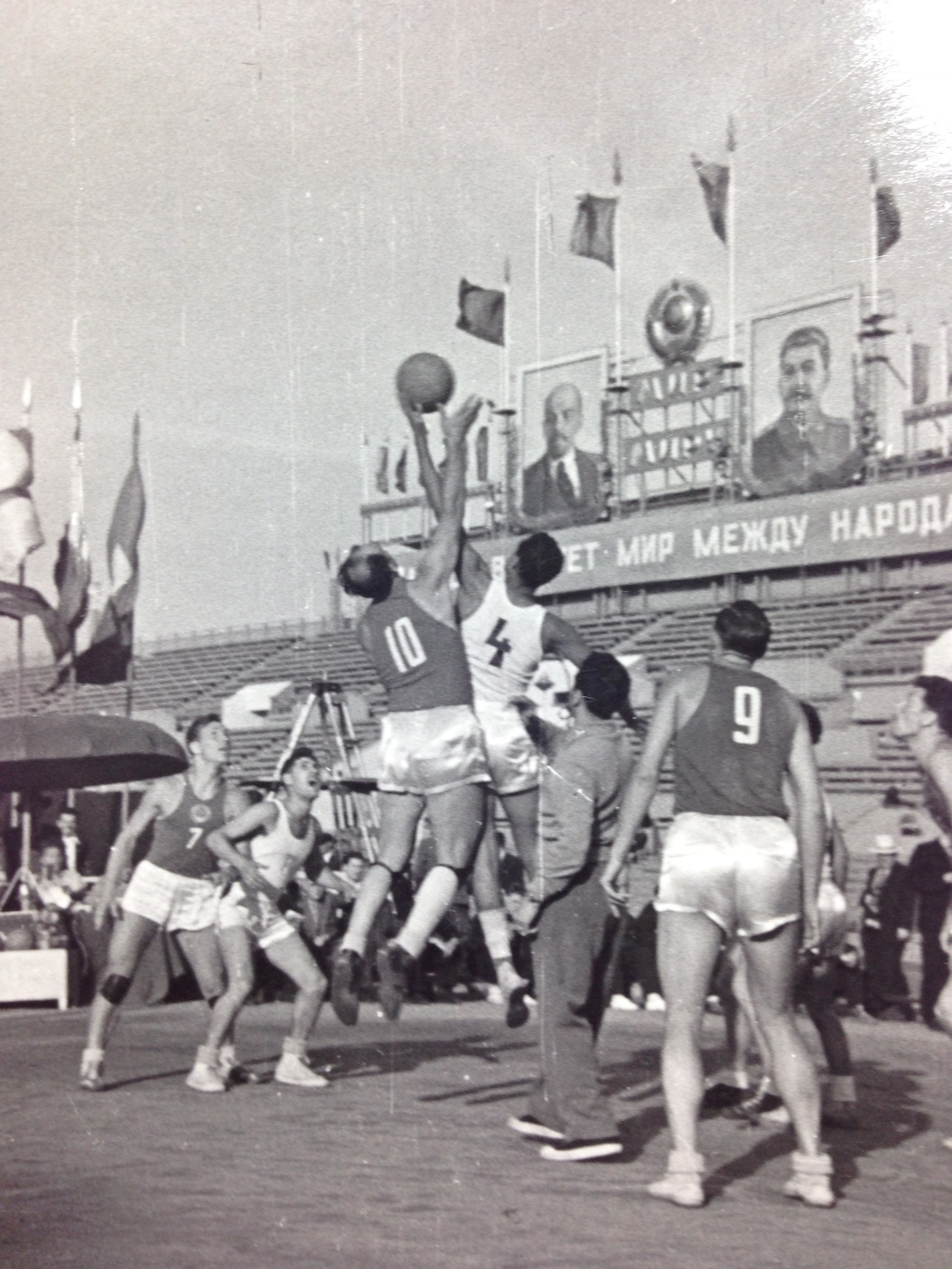
European Cup, Moscow 1953. Zacharia Ofri (#4, Israel) tipping off the ball.

Lebanon refused to play Israel for political reasons; they received zero points for the match, as opposed to the usual 1 point for a loss.

Rank	Team	Pts	W	L	PF	PA	Diff
1.	Israel	7	3	1	178	141	+37
2.	Yugoslavia	7	3	1	218	170	+48
3.	Bulgaria	7	3	1	230	182	+48
4.	Finland	5	1	3	184	219	−35
5.	Lebanon	3	0	4	159	257	−98

Bulgaria	61 – 45	Finland
Yugoslavia	25 – 27	Bulgaria
Bulgaria	48 – 61	Israel
Lebanon	51 – 94	Bulgaria
Finland	37 – 41	Yugoslavia
Israel	60 – 36	Finland
Finland	66 – 57	Lebanon
Yugoslavia	57 – 55	Israel
Lebanon	51 – 95	Yugoslavia
Israel	2 – 0 (w/o)	Lebanon

=== Classification round 1 ===
The first classification round was played in two round-robin groups. Teams advanced into the second classification round depending on their results in the first round—first and second place teams played in the 9–12 segment of classification round 2 while third and fourth place teams played for 13th to 16th places. The fifth place team (one group had 5 teams, the other had 4) received 17th place.

==== Group 1 ====
Rank	Team	Pts	W	L	PF	PA	Diff
1.	Bulgaria	6	3	0	255	128	+127
2.	Switzerland	5	2	1	168	163	+5
3.	West Germany	4	1	2	145	164	−19
4.	Denmark	3	0	3	99	212	−113

Bulgaria	82 – 50	West Germany
Bulgaria	77 – 52	Switzerland
Bulgaria	96 – 26	Denmark
West Germany	44 – 51	Switzerland
Denmark	31 – 51	West Germany
Switzerland	65 – 42	Denmark

==== Group 2 ====
Rank	Team	Pts	W	L	PF	PA	Diff
1.	Belgium	7	3	1	263	213	+50
2.	Finland	7	3	1	216	185	+31
3.	Romania	7	3	1	250	213	+37
4.	Lebanon	5	1	3	241	235	+6
5.	Sweden	4	0	4	156	280	−124

Romania	60 – 55	Belgium
Sweden	43 – 74	Romania
Romania	51 – 59	Finland
Lebanon	56 – 65	Romania
Belgium	75 – 38	Sweden
Finland	49 – 59	Belgium
Belgium	74 – 66	Lebanon
Sweden	32 – 55	Finland
Lebanon	76 – 43	Sweden
Finland	53 – 43	Lebanon

=== Classification round 2 ===
==== Classification 13–16 ====
West Germany	58 – 56	Lebanon
Romania	80 – 53	Denmark

===== Classification 15/16 =====
Lebanon	74 – 40	Denmark

===== Classification 13/14 =====
West Germany	59 – 69	Romania

==== Classification 9–12 ====
Bulgaria	57 – 45	Finland
Belgium	59 – 43	Switzerland

===== Classification 11/12 =====
Finland	45 – 51	Switzerland

===== Classification 9/10 =====
Bulgaria	71 – 52	Belgium

=== Final round ===
The final round was played as an 8-team round robin, with no further playoffs.

Egypt refused to play Israel for political reasons; they received zero points for the match, as opposed to the usual 1 point for a loss, meaning they finished with 7 points to Italy's 8 despite having the same record.

Rank	Team	Pts	W	L	PF	PA	Diff
1.	Soviet Union	14	7	0	444	265	+179
2.	Hungary	11	4	3	375	282	+93
3.	France	11	4	3	391	374	+17
4.	Czechoslovakia	11	4	3	387	332	+55
5.	Israel	11	4	3	238	327	−89
6.	Yugoslavia	10	3	4	334	370	−36
7.	Italy	8	1	6	323	387	−64
8.	Egypt	7	1	6	271	426	−155

Israel	20 – 66	Hungary
Israel	25 – 75	Soviet Union
Israel	45 – 62	France
Israel	2 – 0 (w/o)	Egypt
Israel	59 – 53	Czechoslovakia
Israel	47 – 42	Italy
Israel	40 – 29	Yugoslavia
Hungary	24 – 29	Soviet Union
France	50 – 39	Hungary
Hungary	89 – 50	Egypt
Czechoslovakia	44 – 39	Hungary
Hungary	49 – 38	Italy
Yugoslavia	51 – 69	Hungary
Soviet Union	80 – 51	France
Egypt	27 – 66	Soviet Union
Soviet Union	49 – 41	Czechoslovakia
Italy	54 – 88	Soviet Union
Soviet Union	57 – 43	Yugoslavia
France	73 – 62	Egypt
Czechoslovakia	55 – 47	France
France	52 – 54	Italy
Yugoslavia	39 – 56	France
Egypt	33 – 87	Czechoslovakia
Italy	51 – 60	Egypt
Egypt	39 – 58	Yugoslavia
Czechoslovakia	43 – 39	Italy
Yugoslavia	66 – 64	Czechoslovakia
Italy	45 – 48	Yugoslavia

1953 FIBA EuroBasket champions

Soviet Union
3rd title

== Final standings ==
1. Soviet Union
2. Hungary
3. France
4. Czechoslovakia
5. Israel
6. Yugoslavia
7. Italy
8. Egypt
9. Bulgaria
10. Belgium
11. Switzerland
12. Finland
13. Romania
14. West Germany
15. Lebanon
16. Denmark
17. Sweden

== Team rosters ==
1. Soviet Union: Otar Korkia, Stepas Butautas, Armenak Alachachian, Ilmar Kullam, Heino Kruus, Anatoly Konev, Aleksandr Moiseyev, Kazys Petkevičius, Justinas Lagunavičius, Yuri Ozerov, Algirdas Lauritėnas, Viktor Vlasov, Gunars Siliņš, Lev Reshetnikov (Coach: Konstantin Travin)

2. Hungary: János Greminger, Tibor Mezőfi, Tibor Zsíros, Laszlo Bánhegyi, Pál Bogár, György Bokor, Tibor Cselkó, Tibor Czinkán, Janos Hody, Laszlo Hody, Ede Komaromi, Péter Papp, Tibor Remay, János Simon (Coach: János Páder)

3. France: André Buffiere, René Chocat, Jacques Dessemme, Jacques Freimuller, Claude Gallay, Robert Guillin, Roger Haudegand, Robert Monclar, Jean Perniceni, Bernard Planque, Marc Quiblier, Henry Rey, Justy Specker, André Vacheresse (Coach: Robert Busnel)

4. Czechoslovakia: Ivan Mrazek, Jiří Baumruk, Zdeněk Bobrovský, Miroslav Škeřík, Jaroslav Šíp, Jan Kozák, Zdeněk Rylich, Radoslav Sís, Jaroslav Tetiva, Jindřich Kinský, Lubomír Kolář, Rudolf Stanček, Eugen Horniak (Coach: Lubomír Dobrý)

5. Israel: Ralph Klein, Avraham Schneor, Zacharia Ofri, Daniel Levy, Menachem Korman, Freddy Cohen, David Heiblum, Shimon Shelah, Ernst Wiener, Marcel Hefez, Mark Mimran, Dan Erez, Reuven Fecher (Coach: Jacob Saltiel)

6. Yugoslavia: Borko Jovanović, Mirko Marjanović, Milan Bjegojević, Đorđe Andrijašević, Ladislav Demšar, Borislav Stanković, Dragan Godžić, Aleksandar Gec, Aleksandar Blašković, Srđan Kalember, Vilmos Lóczi, Borislav Ćurčić, Lajos Engler (Coach: Nebojša Popović)
