= James Tratas =

- Born: Žilvinas Tratas; 10 December 1988 (age 37); Vilnius, Lithuania
- Occupation: Actor
- Years active: 2010-present

Žilvinas Tratas, also known as James Tratas (born 10 December 1988) is a Lithuanian actor, screenwriter and TV personality.

== Biography ==
James Tratas was born in Vilnius, Lithuania. His father Jurijus is a carpenter and his mother Vitalija plays flute in the Lithuanian National Military Band. From an early age his parents tried to direct him towards the arts. He attended Secondary School of Tuskulėnai, which has enchanted fine arts module and Musical School of Balys Dvarionas. In early teens Tratas rebelled against this decision and exchanged musical school for boxing.

From 2009 to 2014 he studied at Lithuanian Academy of Music and Theatre where he obtained the bachelor's degree in acting. He started to work actively in film, TV and theatre in his first year of studies and gained national recognition before receiving a diploma. His first national break was after portraying a ruthless villain in a cult Lithuanian TV series Nemylimi Svetimi Pasmerkti.

Soon after obtaining diploma in 2014, he left Lithuania to pursue an international acting career. Since then he worked in films with oscar winning directors (Nikita Mikhalkov, Gabrielle Salvatores) in different countries such as United Kingdom, Russia, Czech Republic.

== Filmography ==
Year	Title	Role	Notes
2022	The Generation of Evil	Young police chief Gintas Krasauskas	Movie, important role
2022	W3B	Gangster "Lenciūgas"	TV mini-series
2021	Your Home Is Where Your Heart / Дiм, де серце / Дом, где сердце	Igor	TV mini-series, melodrama, leading role
2018	Baker and Beauty	Pit Hovens	TV Movie
2017	Going Vertical / Движение вверх	Modestas Paulauskas	Movie, important role
2017	B&B	Alex	Movie
2017	Optimists / Оптимисты	Emil Figeroa	TV series, small role
2016	Guardians Of The Night / Ночные Стражи	Vampire	Movie
2016	Mamon	Bodyguard	TV movie
2015	VIP Murders	Boris	TV movie
2015	Chasing Solace	Jonas	Short Movie
2014	Vinari	Maldavan	TV movie
2014	Pasmerkti III	Taisonas	TV movie
2014	The Romanovs	Peter the Great	Documentary
2014	Secret Societies	Strong Student	Documentary
2014	The Assets	FBI Agent	Miniseries
2014	Vilė	Balys	Short
2014	Russian Yeti: The Killer Lives	Semyon Zolotarev	Documentary
2014	Pasmerkti II	Taisonas	TV movie
2014	Radviliada	Scout	Documentary
2013	Anna Carenina	Soldier	TV movie
2013	Siberian Education	"Shorty"	Movie
2013	Janine	Donatas	Short movie
2012	6	Vladka	Short Movie
