= Anatoli Polivoda =

Ukrainian basketball player (1947–2024)

Anatoliy Polyvoda
- Polivoda in 1972

Personal information
- Born: 29 May 1947 Yenakiieve, Stalino Oblast, Ukrainian SSR, USSR
- Died: 22 January 2024 (aged 76)
- Listed height: 6 ft 7 in (2.01 m)
- Listed weight: 231 lb (105 kg)
- Position: Power forward
Medals
Representing Soviet Union
Men's basketball
Olympic Games
| Bronze medal – third place | 1968 Mexico City | USSR |
| Gold medal – first place | 1972 Munich | USSR |
FIBA World Cup
| Gold medal – first place | 1967 Montevideo |
EuroBasket
| Gold medal – first place | 1967 Finland |
| Gold medal – first place | 1969 Italy |
| Gold medal – first place | 1971 West Germany |
European Championship for Juniors
| Gold medal – first place | 1966 Italy | Team |

Anatoliy Ivanovych Polyvoda (Ukrainian: Анатолій Іванович Поливода; 29 May 1947 – 22 January 2024) was a Ukrainian basketball player who played for the Budivelnyk of Kyiv and the Soviet Union. He trained at VSS Avanhard in Kyiv.

Polyvoda played in the Soviet team at the 1968 Olympic Games in which he won a bronze medal, and at the 1972 Olympic Games where he won a gold medal.

Polyvoda died on 22 January 2024, at the age of 76. Of the Munich Olympic champion team, only Modestas Paulauskas and Ivan Edeshko are still living.

== Titles ==
- World Champion 1967
- European champion: 1967, 1969, 1971
- Soviet League champion 1967
