= Gennadi Volnov =

Russian basketball player

Personal information
- Born: November 28, 1939 Moscow, Russian SFSR, Soviet Union
- Died: July 15, 2008 (aged 68) Moscow, Russia
- Listed height: 6 ft 7 in (2.01 m)
- Listed weight: 185 lb (84 kg)

Career information
- Playing career: 1957–1972
- Position: Power forward / Center
- Number: 13

Career history
- 1957–1958: Spartak Moscow
- 1958–1970: CSKA Moscow
- 1971: Burevestnik Moscow
- 1972: Dynamo Moscow

Career highlights
- 3× EuroLeague champion (1961, 1963, 1969); FIBA European Selection (1969); 10× USSR League champion (1959–1966, 1969, 1970); 2× USSR Spartakiad winner (1959, 1963); USSR Honored Master of Sports (1964); USSR Order of the Badge of Honor; 2× USSR Medal "For Labour Valour"; USSR Medal "For Distinguished Labour"; Russian Order of Honor; 101 Greats of European Basketball (2018)

Gennadi Georgievich Volnov (alternate spelling: Gennady, Russian: Геннадий Георгиевич Вольнов, November 28, 1939 – July 15, 2008) was a Russian basketball player who played for the senior Soviet Union national team from the late 1950s, to the early 1970s. He was born in Moscow. In 2018, he was named one of the 101 Greats of European Basketball.

== Club career ==
Volnov played with Spartak Moscow (1957–1958). He spent most of his club career playing with CSKA Moscow (1958–1970). While playing with CSKA and the Russian and Moscow unified teams, he won ten Soviet League championships (1959, 1960, 1961, 1962, 1963, 1964, 1965, 1966, 1969, and 1970) and three EuroLeague championships (1961, 1963, and 1969).

== National team career ==
Volnov won the gold medal while playing with the senior Soviet national team at the 1972 Summer Olympic Games. He also won two silver medals at the Summer Olympics (1960 and 1964). He also won a bronze medal at the 1968 Summer Olympic Games.

In addition, Volnov also won a gold medal at the 1967 FIBA World Championship, a bronze medal at the 1963 FIBA World Championship, and six FIBA EuroBasket gold medals (1959, 1961, 1963, 1965, 1967, and 1969).
