= Yuri Korneev =

Russian basketball player

Personal information
- Born: March 26, 1937 Moscow, Soviet Union
- Died: June 17, 2002 (aged 65) Moscow, Russia
- Listed height: 6 ft 6 in (1.98 m)
- Listed weight: 205 lb (93 kg)

Career information
- Playing career: 1954–1966
- Position: Small forward

Career history
- 1954–1961: Dynamo Moscow
- 1962–1966: CSKA Moscow

Career highlights
- EuroLeague champion (1963); 6× USSR League champion (1959, 1962, 1963, 1964, 1965, 1966)
Medals
Representing Soviet Union
Men's basketball
Olympic Games
| Silver medal – second place | 1960 Rome | USSR |
| Silver medal – second place | 1964 Tokyo | USSR |
World Cup
| Bronze medal – third place | 1963 Brazil | USSR |
EuroBasket
| Gold medal – first place | 1959 Turkey | USSR |
| Gold medal – first place | 1961 Yugoslavia | USSR |

Yuri Korneev (March 26, 1937 in Moscow, Soviet Union – June 17, 2002), was a Russian basketball player. At a height of 1.98 m (6 ft 6 in) tall, he played at the small forward position. He was among the 105 player nominees for the 50 Greatest EuroLeague Contributors list.

== Club career ==
Korneev started his club career with Dynamo Moscow, but he eventually moved to CSKA Moscow, where he became one of the club's cornerstones in the 1960s. While a member of the Red Army club, Korneev won a EuroLeague championship in 1963. He scored 15 crucial points in the tie-breaking final game against Real Madrid, after first two games of the finals were not enough to crown a champion. He made it to the EuroLeague Final once again, two years later, when Real took their revenge for what had been a bitter loss 2 years earlier. In addition to that, Korneev helped CSKA to win five Soviet Union League championships.

Korneev left CSKA in the prime of his career, due to a Soviet rule at the time, that did not allow players above 25 years old to play for the Army-supported team.

== National team career ==
Korneev was a regular member of the senior Soviet national basketball team. Korneev won two EuroBasket gold medals, in 1959 and 1961, two Summer Olympics silver medals, in 1960 and 1964, and a bronze medal at the 1963 FIBA World Championship.
