= Aleksandr Petrov (basketball) =

Basketball player (1939–2001)

Personal information
- Born: 14 May 1939 Baku, Azerbaijan SSR, Soviet Union
- Died: 5 May 2001 (aged 61) Moscow, Russia
- Listed height: 208 cm (6 ft 10 in)
- Listed weight: 104 kg (229 lb)

Career information
- Playing career: 1954–1966
- Position: Center
- Number: 14

Career history
- 1954–1956: SKIF Baku
- 1957–1962: Dynamo Tbilisi
- 1962–1963: CSKA Moscow
- 1963–1966: Dynamo Moscow

Career highlights
- As player: 2× EuroLeague champion (1962, 1963); USSR Premier League champion (1963); USSR Spartakiad champion (1963); Honored Master of Sports of the USSR (1964); Order of the Badge of Honor

Aleksandr Pavlovich Petrov (alternate spellings: Alexander, Alexandre) (Russian: Александр Павлович Петров; 14 May 1939 – 5 May 2001) was a Soviet-Azerbaijani basketball player and coach. He was one of the first very tall centers in Soviet basketball history. During his club playing career, Petrov won EuroLeague championships, in 1962 and 1963. As a member of the senior men's Soviet Union national team, he was voted to the All-Tournament Team of the 1963 FIBA World Cup. For his achievements in the sport of basketball, Petrov was awarded the Honored Master of Sports of the USSR and the Order of the Badge of Honor.

== Club career ==
During his pro club playing career, Petrov played with the USSR Premier League teams Dynamo Tbilisi, CSKA Moscow, and Dynamo Moscow. As a member of Dynamo Tbilisi, Petrov won the EuroLeague championship in the 1961–62 season. As a member of CSKA Moscow, Petrov also won the EuroLeague championship, in the 1962–63 season.

== National team career ==
Petrov was a member of the senior men's Soviet Union national team. While representing the USSR, Petrov won four FIBA EuroBasket championships. He won gold medals at the 1959 EuroBasket, the 1961 EuroBasket, the 1963 EuroBasket, and the 1965 EuroBasket.

With the USSR, Petrov also won silver medals at the both 1960 Rome Summer Olympics and the 1964 Tokyo Summer Olympics. He also won a bronze medal at the 1963 FIBA World Cup, where he was named to the All-Tournament Team.

== Coaching career ==
After he retired from playing club basketball, Petrov became as basketball coach. He coached basketball teams in Moscow, and also later in Madagascar.
