= Lepmets =

Family name

Lepmets is an Estonian surname meaning "alder forest". Notable people with the surname include:

- Sergei Lepmets (born 1987), football goalkeeper
- Tõnno Lepmets (1938–2005), retired basketball player
