= Anatoly Myshkin =

Soviet and Russian professional basketball player and coach

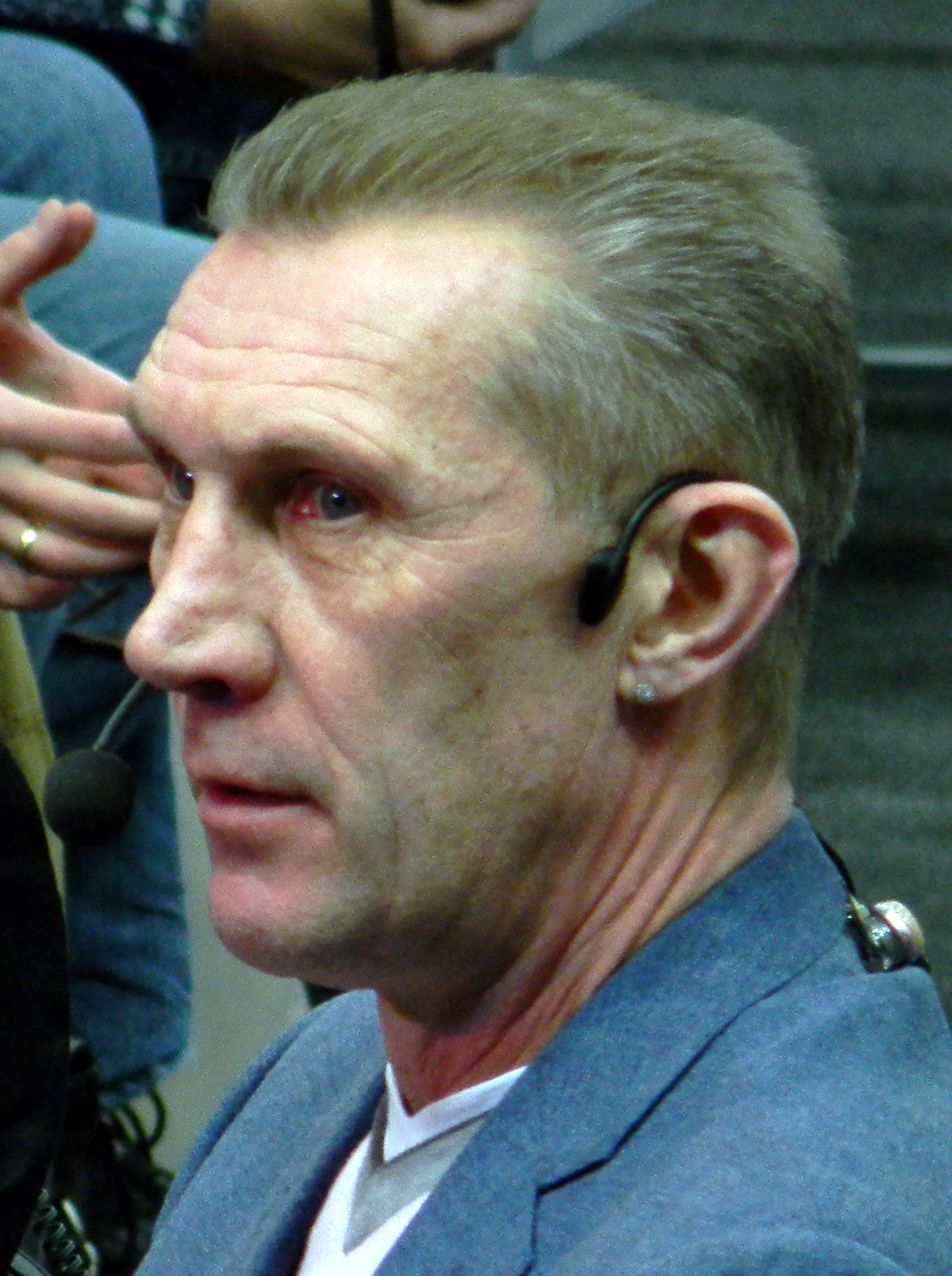
- Myshkin in 2011

Personal information
- Born: August 14, 1954 (age 72) Sylva, Sverdlovsk Oblast, Russian SFSR, Soviet Union
- Listed height: 207 cm (6 ft 9 in)
- Listed weight: 95 kg (209 lb)

Career information
- Playing career: 1970–1986
- Position: Small forward / power forward
- Number: 12
- Coaching career: 1986–present

Career history

Playing
- 1970–1976: Uralmash Sverdlovsk
- 1976–1984: CSKA Moscow
- 1985: Dynamo Moscow
- 1985–1986: CSKA Moscow

Coaching
- 1986–1988: CSKA women (assistant)
- 1988–2001: CSKA women
- 2001–2004: Arsenal Tula
- 2005–2006: Universitet Surgut
- 2006–2007: Bizon
- 2007–2008: Dynamo Kursk
- 2008–2011: Bizon
- 2013–2015: Russia women

Career highlights
- As a player: FIBA's 50 Greatest Players (1991); 2× FIBA European Selection (1979, 1982); 8× USSR League champion (1977–1984); USSR Cup winner (1982); As a head coach: USSR League women's champion (1989); 2× Ronchetti Cup champion (1989, 1997); 6× Russian League women's champion (1992–1997); Russian Women's Cup winner (1996)
Medals
Men's basketball
Representing Soviet Union
Olympic Games
Bronze medal – third place	1976 Montreal
Bronze medal – third place	1980 Moscow
FIBA World Championship
Silver medal – second place	1978 Philippines
Gold medal – first place	1982 Colombia
FIBA EuroBasket
Bronze medal – third place	1973 Spain
Silver medal – second place	1977 Belgium
Gold medal – first place	1979 Italy
Gold medal – first place	1981 Czechoslovakia
Bronze medal – third place	1983 France

Anatoly Dmitriyevich Myshkin (born August 14, 1954) is a retired Soviet and Russian professional basketball player and coach. At 6 feet 9 1/2 inches (2.07 m) tall, and a weight of 210 lbs. (95 kg), he played as a combo forward (small forward-power forward). Myshkin was able to break up all of the defensive schemes in European basketball, due to his unique skill set.

He was named one of FIBA's 50 Greatest Players in 1991. He was among the 105 player nominees for the 50 Greatest EuroLeague Contributors list. He was nicknamed, "The Prince".

== Club career ==
While playing with CSKA Moscow, Myshkin won eight consecutive Soviet Union League titles, from 1977 to 1984. Even though his team was a FIBA European Champions Cup (EuroLeague) regular, Myshkin never had the chance to play for the European-wide top-tier level continental title.

== National team career ==
As a member of the senior Soviet Union national team, Myshkin led them to back-to-back EuroBasket gold medals in 1979 and 1981. He also won the gold medal at the 1982 FIBA World Championship, in Colombia.

== Coaching career ==
Following his retirement, Myshkin became a coach, and he coached the clubs CSKA Moscow, Arsenal Tula, Universitet Surgut, and Dynamo Kursk. In 2013, he became the head coach of the Russian women's national basketball team.
