= Sergejus Jovaiša =

Lithuanian basketball player (born 1954)

Member of the Seimas
- Incumbent
- Assumed office 16 November 2012
- Constituency: Multi-member

Personal details
- Born: 17 December 1954 (age 71) Anykščiai, Lithuanian SSR, Soviet Union
- Party: Homeland Union
- Education: Kaunas University of Technology
- Profession: Engineer economist
- Basketball career

Personal information
- Listed height: 1.94 m (6 ft 4 in)
- Listed weight: 85 kg (187 lb)

Career information
- Playing career: 1972–1998
- Position: Shooting guard

Career history
- 1972–1989: Žalgiris
- 1989–1995: Brandt Hagen
- 1995–1998: ATS Cuxhaven
Medals
Men's basketball
Olympic Games
Representing the Soviet Union
Bronze medal – third place	1980 Moscow	National team
Representing Lithuania
Bronze medal – third place	1992 Barcelona	National team
European Championships
Representing the Soviet Union
Gold medal – first place	1981 Czechoslovakia	National team
Bronze medal – third place	1983 France	National team
Gold medal – first place	1985 West Germany	National team
Silver medal – second place	1987 Greece	National team

Sergejus Jovaiša (born 17 December 1954) is a Lithuanian former professional basketball player. He played at the shooting guard position and won the bronze medal with Lithuania national team at the 1992 Summer Olympics. He was also a member of the Soviet national team that won the bronze medal at the 1980 Summer Olympics.

== Filmography ==
Year	Title	Role	Notes	Ref
2012	The Other Dream Team	Himself	Documentary about the Lithuania men's national basketball team at the 1992 Summer Olympics.	
2023	Bilietas (The Ticket)	Himself	Documentary about the basketball club Žalgiris Kaunas in 1979–1989.	
