= Arkady Bochkaryov =

Soviet basketball player

Personal information
- Born: 24 February 1931 Moscow, Russian SFSR, Soviet Union
- Died: 29 March 1988 (aged 57)

Sport
- Sport: Basketball
- Club: Spartak Moscow (1951–1954); CSKA Moscow (1954–1965)
Medal record
Representing Soviet Union
Olympic Games
Silver medal – second place	1956 Melbourne	Team
FIBA EuroBasket
Bronze medal – third place	1955 Budapest	Team
Gold medal – first place	1957 Sofia	Team
Gold medal – first place	1959 Istanbul	Team

Arkady Andreyevich Bochkaryov (alternate spelling: Arkady Andreevich Bochkarev, Russian: Аркадий Андреевич Бочкарёв; 24 February 1931 – 29 March 1988) was a Soviet basketball player. He was a member of the Soviet team between 1953 and 1959 and won a silver medal at the 1956 Summer Olympics, as well as the European titles in 1957 and 1959. After retirement, he worked as a sport functionary with the Soviet Army.
