= Alexander Belostenny =

Ukrainian basketball player (1959–2010)

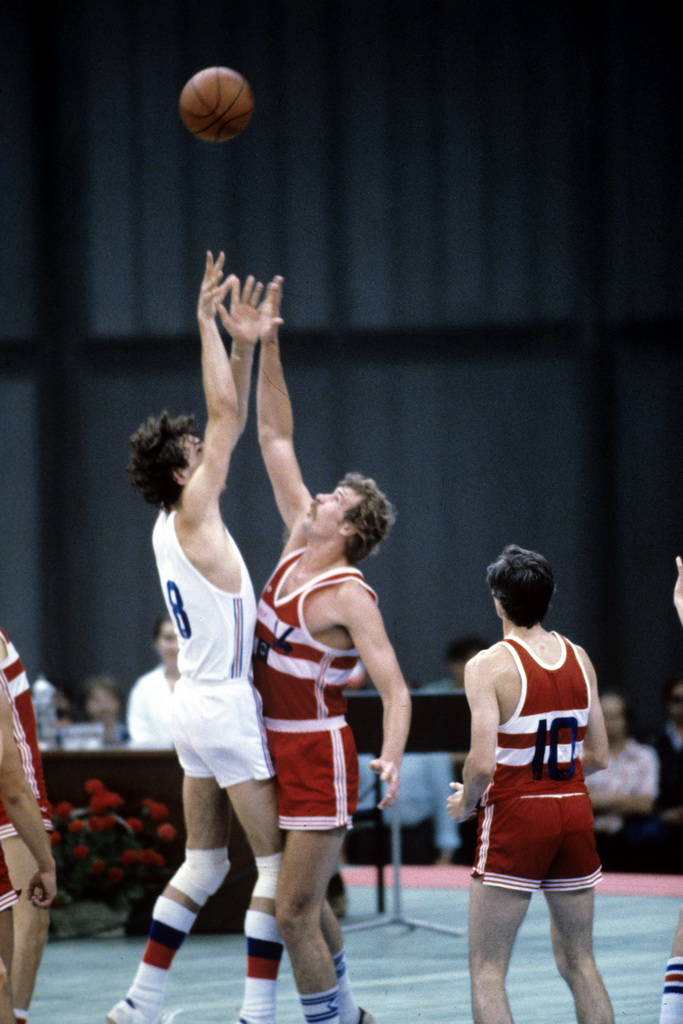
- Belostenny (#14 in red), at the 1980 Summer Olympics, versus Czechoslovakia.

Personal information
- Born: 24 February 1959 Odesa, Ukrainian SSR, Soviet Union
- Died: 24 May 2010 (aged 51) Trier, Germany
- Listed height: 2.16 m (7 ft 1 in)
- Listed weight: 120 kg (265 lb)

Career information
- Playing career: 1975–1994
- Position: Center

Career history
- 1975–1979: Budivelnyk Kyiv
- 1979–1980: CSKA Moscow
- 1980–1989: Budivelnyk Kyiv
- 1989–1990: CAI Zaragoza
- 1990–1994: TBB Trier

Career highlights
- FIBA European Selection (1979); Spanish Cup winner (1990); 2× USSR League champion (1980, 1989); Order of Merit (Ukraine) (2002)
Medals
Men's basketball
Representing the Soviet Union
Summer Olympic Games
| Gold medal – first place | 1988 Seoul |
| Bronze medal – third place | 1980 Moscow |
FIBA World Cup
| Gold medal – first place | 1982 Colombia |
| Silver medal – second place | 1978 Philippines |
| Silver medal – second place | 1986 Spain |
| Silver medal – second place | 1990 Argentina |
FIBA Eurobasket
| Gold medal – first place | 1979 Italy |
| Gold medal – first place | 1981 Czechoslovakia |
| Gold medal – first place | 1985 West Germany |
| Silver medal – second place | 1977 Belgium |
| Bronze medal – third place | 1983 France |
| Bronze medal – third place | 1989 Yugoslavia |
European Under-18 Championship
| Gold medal – first place | 1978 Italy | Under-18 |
| Silver medal – second place | 1976 Spain |
European Championship for Cadets
| Gold medal – first place | 1975 Greece | Under-16 |

Alexander Mikhaylovich Belostenny (Ukrainian: Олександр Михайлович Білостінний, romanized: Oleksandr Mykhailovych Bilostinnyi; Russian: Александр Михайлович Белостенный; 24 February 1959 – 25 May 2010) was a Ukrainian professional basketball player. He was a member of the senior Soviet national team, from 1977 to 1992, except for an absence during a single competition, EuroBasket 1987. At a height of 2.16 m (7'0 1/4") tall, and a weight of 120 kg (260 lbs.), he played at the center position.

== Club career ==
Belostenny spent most of his club career at Budivelnyk from Kyiv, and was a leading player in its only Soviet Union League title in 1989. Late in his career, he played with the German club HERZOGtel Trier, where he also competed in the FIBA Korać Cup. He was a FIBA European Selection, in 1979.

== National team career ==
As a player of the senior Soviet national team, Belostenny won three gold medals at the FIBA EuroBasket (EuroBasket 1979, EuroBasket 1981, and EuroBasket 1985), one gold medal at the 1988 Summer Olympic Games, and one bronze medal at the 1980 Summer Olympic Games. In addition, he is one of the top medalists in FIBA World Cup history, having won four medals, one gold (1982) and three silvers (1978, 1986, and 1990).

== Awards and accomplishments ==
=== Clubs ===
- FIBA European Selection: (1979)
- 2× USSR League Champion: (1980, 1989)
- Spanish Cup Winner: (1990)

== Death ==
Belostenny died on 25 May 2010 from lung cancer.
