= Viktor Pankrashkin =

Soviet basketball player

Personal information
- Born: 10 December 1957 Moscow, Russian SFSR, Soviet Union
- Died: 24 July 1993 (aged 35) Moscow, Russian Federation
- Listed height: 2.16 m (7 ft 1 in)
- Listed weight: 115 kg (254 lb)

Career information
- Playing career: ?–1992
- Position: Center

Career history
- ?–?: SKA Lvov
- ?–1979: SKA Riga
- 1979–1989: CSKA Moscow
- 1989–1990: Urartu Yerevan
- 1991–1992: Metall Tula

Career highlights
- 6× Soviet League champion (1980–1984, 1988)
Medals
Men's basketball
Representing Soviet Union
Olympic Games
| Gold medal – first place | 1988 Seoul | Men's basketball |
FIBA EuroBasket
| Bronze medal – third place | 1983 France |
| Silver medal – second place | 1987 Greece |

Viktor Pankrashkin (Russian: Виктор Александрович Панкрашкин; 10 December 1957 – 24 July 1993) was a Soviet basketball player.

Pankrashkin won a gold medal at the 1988 Summer Olympics. Also, he won one silver and one bronze at the EuroBasket.

== Club career ==
Pankrashkin only came to basketball at the age of 17. Because of his height, he was noticed by an army basketball coach. After a short time with different army teams he came to CSKA Moscow, where he spent 10 years. In addition to his height, he had an enormous arm length so that he could stand on his heel and touch the basketball ring. With these physical virtues, blocked shots became his trademark. He won five Soviet championships in a row with CSKA. He celebrated his greatest triumph in 1988 when he won the gold medal at the 1988 Olympic Games in Seoul as a member of the Soviet national team. After 1988, CSKA got a new coach, with whom Pankraschkin fell out. He left Moscow and joined the new Armenian club Urartu in Yerevan. In terms of sport, however, his most successful period was over.

== Disease ==
As early as 1986 Pankrashkin was diagnosed with tuberculosis. He initially kept the disease a secret. The further progression of the disease made it impossible to play basketball from 1992 onwards. He died of this disease on July 24, 1993.
