= Viktor Zubkov (basketball) =

Russian basketball player (1937–2016)

Personal information
- Born: 24 April 1937 Rostov-on-Don, Russian SFSR, Soviet Union
- Died: 16 October 2016 (aged 79) Moscow, Russia
- Listed height: 6 ft 8.5 in (2.04 m)
- Listed weight: 195 lb (88 kg)

Career information
- Playing career: 1955–1967
- Position: Center
- Number: 7
- Coaching career: 1979–1981

Career history

Playing
- 1955–1957: Rustovnna Burevestnik
- 1957–1967: CSKA Moscow

Coaching
- 1979–1981: Mozambique

Career highlights
- As a player: FIBA's 50 Greatest Players (1991); 2× EuroLeague champion (1961, 1963); FIBA EuroBasket MVP (1959); 8× USSR League champion (1959–1966)
Medals
Representing Soviet Union
Men's Basketball
Olympic Games
Silver medal – second place	1956 Melbourne
Silver medal – second place	1960 Rome
FIBA World Cup
Bronze medal – third place	1963 Brazil
EuroBasket
Gold medal – first place	1957 Sofia
Gold medal – first place	1959 Istanbul
Gold medal – first place	1961 Belgrade

Viktor Alekseyevich Zubkov (Russian: Виктор Алексеевич Зубков; 24 April 1937 – 16 October 2016) was a Soviet professional basketball player and coach. At a height of 2.04 m (6 ft 8 in), he played at the center position. He is considered to be one of the most distinguished players of Soviet and European basketball in the 1950s and 1960s.

He won two silver medals at the Summer Olympic Games, while representing the senior men's Soviet national team. He was named one of FIBA's 50 Greatest Players in 1991.

== Club playing career ==
Zubkov played at the club level with CSKA Moscow, with whom he won 8 Soviet national league titles (1959–1966), and two FIBA European Champions Cup (EuroLeague) titles (1961 and 1963).

== National team career ==
As a member of the senior men's Soviet national team for seven years (1956–1963), he won two Olympic silver medals (1956 and 1960), one FIBA World Cup bronze medal, in 1963 (in which he was also the team captain), and three EuroBasket gold medals (1957, 1959, and 1961).

== Post-playing career ==
Zubkov retired from playing basketball in 1966, and after that, he worked as senior instructor and deputy chief of the military-engineering academy, named after Valerian Kuybyshev, and as the head coach of the senior Mozambican national team.

== Death ==
Zubkov died on 16 October 2016.
