= Ilmar Kullam =

Estonian basketball player

Personal information
- Born: June 15, 1922 Tartu, Estonia
- Died: November 2, 2011 (aged 89) Tartu, Estonia
Medal record
Representing Soviet Union
Men's basketball
Olympic Games
Silver medal – second place	1952 Helsinki	Team competition
EuroBasket
Gold medal – first place	1947 Czechoslovakia	USSR
Gold medal – first place	1951 France	USSR
Gold medal – first place	1953 USSR	USSR

Ilmar Kullam (15 June 1922 – 2 November 2011) was an Estonian basketball player who competed for the Soviet Union in the 1952 Summer Olympics. He was a member of the Soviet team, which won the silver medal. He played all eight matches. He trained at VSS Kalev in Tartu. He is 191 cm power forward. He was elected to the Hall of Fame of Estonian basketball in 2010.

== Club career ==
Started playing basketball in 1938 as a member of Kalev Tartu. With the team of the Kalev Tallinn he won a bronze medal (1945), with the team of the University of Tartu he won a gold medal (1949), a silver medal (1950) and bronze medal (1951) of Soviet Union League Championship.

== Coach career ==
After his career as a player, worked as a basketball coach in Tartu, coached the Estonian National Team and Kalev Tartu in the Championships of the Soviet Union (1960–75, as the head coach until 1971). Assistant coach of the women’s team of the University of Tartu in 1978–87 and the Estonian Women’s National Team in 1978–85.

== Achievements ==
=== National team ===
- Olympic Games: 1952
- European Championships: 1947, 1951, 1953

=== Club ===
- Soviet Union League Championship: 1949
- Estonian SSR Championship: 1948, 1956, 1957, 1960

== Orders ==
Order of the White Star, 5th Class: 1997
