= Vadym Hladun =

Soviet-Ukrainian basketball player (1937–2024)

Personal information
- Born: 21 April 1937 Kyiv, Ukrainian SSR, USSR
- Died: 5 March 2024 (aged 86)
- Listed height: 6 ft 1 in (1.85 m)

Career information
- College: National University of Ukraine on Physical Education and Sport
- Position: Point guard

Career history
- ?–?: Budivelnyk

Vadym Ivanovych Hladun also written as Vadim Gladun (Russian: Вади́м Ива́нович Гладу́н; Ukrainian: Вадим Іванович Гладун; 21 April 1937 – 5 March 2024) was a Soviet-Ukrainian basketball player. He played for BC Budivelnyk and the Soviet national team. Hladun died on 5 March 2024, at the age of 86.

== Awards ==
- 3rd place in the FIBA Basketball World Cup (1963)
- EuroBasket Champion (1963)
- 2x Summer Universiade champion (1959, 1961)
