= Aleksandr Moiseyev (basketball) =

Russian basketball player

Medal record

Men's basketball

Representing Soviet Union

Olympic Games
| Silver medal – second place | 1952 Helsinki | Team competition |

European Championships
| Gold medal – first place | 1947 Czechoslovakia | USSR |
| Gold medal – first place | 1951 France | USSR |
| Gold medal – first place | 1953 USSR | USSR |
| Bronze medal – third place | 1955 Hungary | USSR |

Aleksandr Ivanovich Moiseyev (Russian: Александр Иванович Моисеев; May 28, 1927 – September 9, 2003) was a Russian basketball player who competed for the Soviet Union in the 1952 Summer Olympics. He was Jewish, and trained at Armed Forces sports society in Moscow. and played for CSKA Moscow. He was a member of the Soviet team which won the silver medal. He played all eight matches.
