= Vladas Garastas =

Lithuanian basketball coach (1932–2026)

Personal information
- Born: 8 February 1932 Joniškėlis, Lithuania (Note: Garastas was born in Joniškėlis on 2 February, but baptised in Linkuva on 8 February and the latter was used in the official documents.)
- Died: 10 June 2026 (aged 94) Kaunas, Lithuania

Career information
- Playing career: 1952–1960
- Position: Point guard
- Coaching career: 1979–1998

Career history

Playing
- 1952–1960: Vilniaus rytas

Coaching
- 1979–1989: Žalgiris
- 1990–1992: Prievidza
- 1994–1996: Nevezis
- 1996–1998: Alita Alytus

Career highlights
- As head coach: FIBA Intercontinental Cup champion (1986); EuroLeague finalist (1986); 3× USSR Premier League champion (1985, 1986, 1987); 5× USSR Premier League finalist (1980, 1983, 1984, 1988, 1989)
Medals
Men's basketball
Representing Soviet Union
FIBA World Cup
Silver medal – second place	Argentina 1990
FIBA EuroBasket
Bronze medal – third place	1989 Yugoslavia
Representing Lithuania
Olympic Games
Bronze medal – third place	1992 Barcelona
Bronze medal – third place	1996 Atlanta
FIBA EuroBasket
Silver medal – second place	1995 Greece

Vladas Garastas (8 February 1932 – 10 June 2026) was a Lithuanian professional basketball coach and the president of the Lithuanian Basketball Federation. Following the restoration of Lithuanian independence, he led the national team and won the bronze medals at the 1992 and 1996 Olympics, and silver at EuroBasket 1995.

== Coaching career ==
- 1979–1989: Žalgiris Kaunas head coach
- 1989–1991: Soviet Union national team head coach
- 1990–1992: Prievidza head coach
- 1992–1997: Lithuanian national team head coach
- 1994–1996: Atletas Kaunas head coach
- 1996–1998: Alita Alytus head coach

== Death ==
Garastas died in Kaunas on 10 June 2026, at the age of 94.

== Awards and achievements ==
With Žalgiris Kaunas club:

- Won three USSR Premier Basketball League titles in 1985, 1986, 1987
- Runner-up in five USSR Premier Basketball League tournaments: 1980, 1983, 1984, 1988, 1989
- Won 1986 FIBA Club World Cup
- 2nd place in 1985–86 FIBA European Champions Cup

With Lithuania:

- Bronze medals at the 1992 and 1996 Olympic Basketball Tournaments
- Silver medal in Eurobasket 1995 final against Yugoslavia national team

With Soviet Union national team:

- Bronze medal in Eurobasket 1989
- Silver medal in 1990 FIBA World Championship

== Filmography ==
Year	Title	Role	Notes	Ref
2004	Lietuvos Krepšinis 1920–2004	Himself	Documentary about basketball in Lithuania in 1920–2004.	
2012	The Other Dream Team	Himself	Documentary about the Lithuania men's national basketball team at the 1992 Summer Olympics.	
2023	Bilietas (The Ticket)	Himself	Documentary about the basketball club Žalgiris Kaunas in 1979–1989.	
