= Viktor Vlasov (basketball) =

Russian basketball player

Olympic medal record

Representing Soviet Union

Men's basketball

Olympic Games
Silver medal – second place	1952 Helsinki	Team competition

European Championships
Gold medal – first place	1953 USSR	USSR
Bronze medal – third place	1955 Hungary	USSR

Viktor Petrovich Vlasov (Russian: Виктор Петрович Власов; September 1, 1925 – November 2002) was a Russian basketball player who competed for the Soviet Union in the 1952 Summer Olympics. He was born in Moscow and served in the Soviet military in World War II. He was a member of the Soviet team, which won the silver medal. He trained at Dynamo in Moscow.
