= Heino Kruus =

Estonian basketball player

Olympic medal record

Representing Soviet Union

Men's basketball

Olympic Games
Silver medal – second place	1952 Helsinki	Team competition

EuroBasket
Gold medal – first place	1951 France	USSR
Gold medal – first place	1953 USSR	USSR

Heino Kruus (30 September 1926 in Tallinn – 24 June 2012) was an Estonian basketball player (186 cm) who competed for the Soviet Union in the 1952 Summer Olympics. He trained at VSS Kalev in Tallinn

He was a member of the Soviet team, which won the silver medal. He played in all eight matches. Elected to the Hall of fame of Estonian basketball in 2010.

== Club career ==
Started playing basketball in 1945 as a member of Kalev Tallinn. With the team of the Kalev Tallinn he won a bronze medal (1945), with the team of the University of Tartu he won a gold medal (1949) and a silver medal (1950) of Soviet Union League Championship.

== Achievements ==
=== National team ===
- Olympic Games: 1952
- European Championships: 1951, 1953

=== Club ===
- Soviet Union League Championship: 1949
- Estonian SSR Championship: 1946, 1947, 1949, 1954, 1955

== Orders ==
Order of the White Star, 4th Class: 2001
