= Yuri Ozerov (basketball) =

Russian basketball player

Medal record

Representing Soviet Union

Men's basketball

Olympic Games
Silver medal – second place	1952 Helsinki	Team
Silver medal – second place	1956 Melbourne	Team

European Championships
Gold medal – first place	1953 USSR	Team
Gold medal – first place	1957 Bulgaria	Team
Bronze medal – third place	1955 Hungary	Team

Yuri Viktorovich Ozerov (Russian: Юрий Викторович Озеров; July 5, 1928 – February 25, 2004) was a Russian basketball player who competed for the Soviet Union in the 1952 Summer Olympics and in the 1956 Summer Olympics. He trained at Dynamo in Moscow.

He was a member of the Soviet team which won the silver medal. He played all eight matches. Four years later he won his second silver medal as part of the Soviet team.
