= Juozas Subačius =

Lithuanian-Soviet athlete

Personal information
- Nationality: Lithuanian-Soviet
- Born: 29 February 1928; Kamorūnai, Lithuania
- Died: 14 March 2013 (aged 85); Kaunas, Lithuania

Sport
- Country: USSR
- Sport: Fencing (sabre)

Juozas Subačius (29 February 1928 – 14 March 2013) was a Lithuanian-Soviet sabre fencing champion and coach.

== Biography ==
Juozas Subačius was born on 29 February 1928 in the village of Kamorūnai. He graduated from the Lithuanian Sports University in 1953, and from 1954 (until retirement in 1995) was head of the duels department. Subačius was an instructor of the Spartakas Sports Society. Most notably, Subačius taught fencing as a teacher (1954–1956) and senior teacher (1956–1958 and 1975–1988). From 1958 to 1975 Subačius was head of the fencing department, and was the sports equipment master from 1988 to 1995. Subačius died on 14 March 2013 in Kaunas.

== Sports career ==
Subačius was an eight-times sabre champion of the Lithuanian SSR. In 1958 he was awarded the title of Master of Sport of the USSR. He was ranked number one in the best sabre fencers of the Lithuanian SSR in 1961. In some competitions (1953, 1956, 1957, 1958, 1959, 1960, and 1962) Subačius successfully participated and won in team competitions. In fencing competitions organized for countries of the Baltic region, Subačius was individual bout champion in 1954 and team bout champion in 1962. Remembered mainly as a theorist and practitioner of fencing, Subačius is the namesake of the Subačius Cup, an annual fencing competition held by the Lithuanian Fencing Federation. Subačius also educated multiple fencing coaches and champions, such as Anastazas Špokas, Julija Petrauskaitė-Bukauskienė, Vytautas Matulevičius, and others. Subačius was the council of coaches of the Lithuanian Fencing Federation and the head coach of the national fencing team from 1963 to 1980. He was briefly the federation's president from 1974 to 1975.

Subačius is the author of three fencing books, entitled Fechtavimo mokymo ir treniruotės pagrindai (Fundamentals of Fencing Education and Training; 1983), Fechtuotojų techninis ir taktinis parengimas (Technical and Tactical Preparation of Fencers; 1985), and Fechtavimo taktika ir fechtuotojų taktinis rengimas (Fencing Tactics and Tactical Preparation of Fencers; 1986).
