= Stanislovas Stonkus =

Lithuanian basketball player (1931–2012)

Personal information
- Born: December 29, 1931 Telšiai, Lithuania
- Died: February 19, 2012 (aged 80) Kaunas, Lithuania
Medal record
Men's basketball
Representing the Soviet Union
Olympic Games
Silver medal – second place	1952 Helsinki	USSR
Silver medal – second place	1956 Melbourne	USSR
European Championships
Bronze medal – third place	1955 Hungary	USSR
Gold medal – first place	1957 Bulgaria	USSR

Stanislovas "Stasys" Stonkus (29 December 1931 – 19 February 2012) was a Soviet and Lithuanian basketball player who competed for the Soviet Union in the 1952 Summer Olympics and in the 1956 Summer Olympics. He was born in Telšiai. In 1954, he graduated from the Lithuanian National Physical Education Institute. He trained at VSS Žalgiris in Kaunas.

He was a member of the Soviet team, which won the silver medal. He played one match. Four years later he won his second silver medal as part of the Soviet team. He defended his doctoral dissertation at Tartu University in 1974, and his Dr Habil. before the Joint Council in Moscow. After serving as rector of the Physical Education Institute (1978–1990), he was also vice-president of the Lithuanian Olympic Committee for four years (1992–1996). Stonkus has compiled a dictionary of sports terms in Lithuanian and has written several studies on sport.
