= Vladimer Ugrekhelidze =

Soviet basketball player

Personal information
- Born: 18 August 1939 Tbilisi, Georgian SSR, Soviet Union
- Died: 3 February 2009 (aged 69)
Medal record
Men's basketball
Representing the Soviet Union
Olympic Games
Silver medal – second place	1960 Rome	Team

Vladimer Nestorovich Ugrekhelidze (alternate spelling: Vladimir, Georgian: ვლადიმერ უგრეხელიძე; 18 August 1939 – 3 February 2009) was a Soviet-Georgian basketball player who competed in the 1960 Summer Olympics and won a silver medal. Honoured Master of Sport of the USSR.
