= Guram Minashvili =

Georgian basketball player (1936–2015)

Personal information
- Born: 25 November 1936 Tbilisi, Georgian SSR, Soviet Union
- Died: 1 March 2015 (aged 78) Tbilisi, Georgia
Medal record
Men's basketball
Representing Soviet Union
Olympic Games
Silver medal – second place	1960 Rome	Team competition
European Championships
Gold medal – first place	1957 Bulgaria	Soviet Union
Gold medal – first place	1959 Turkey	Soviet Union
Gold medal – first place	1963 Poland	Soviet Union

Guram Minashvili (Georgian: გურამ მინაშვილი; 25 November 1936 – 1 March 2015) was a Georgian basketball player who competed for the Soviet Union in the 1960 Summer Olympics.
