= Aleksandr Travin =

Russian basketball player

Personal information
- Born: 23 July 1937 Moscow, Russian SFSR, Soviet Union
- Died: 15 February 1989 (aged 51)
- Height: 1.88 m (6 ft 2 in)
- Weight: 85 kg (187 lb)

Sport
- Sport: Basketball
- Club: CSKA
Medal record
Representing Soviet Union
Olympic Games
Silver medal – second place	1964 Tokyo	Team
FIBA Basketball World Cup
Bronze medal – third place	1963 Rio de Janeiro	Team
Gold medal – first place	1967 Montevideo	Team
FIBA EuroBasket
Gold medal – first place	1963 Wrocław	Team
Gold medal – first place	1965 Moscow	Team

Aleksandr Konstantinovich Travin (Russian: Александр Константинович Травин; 23 July 1937 – 15 February 1989) was a Russian basketball player. He was a member of the Soviet team during the 1960s, and won a silver medal at the 1964 Summer Olympics. His teams became European champion in 1963 and 1965 and a world champion in 1967. Nationally, his teams won six USSR Premier Basketball League titles in 1960–1962 and 1964–1966.

He graduated from the Institute of Physical Education in Smolensk and after retirement worked as a coach and lecturer in physical education. After 1979 he coached in East Germany.

His father, Konstantin Travin, was also an international basketball player and coach.
