= Sergei Tarakanov =

Russian basketball player

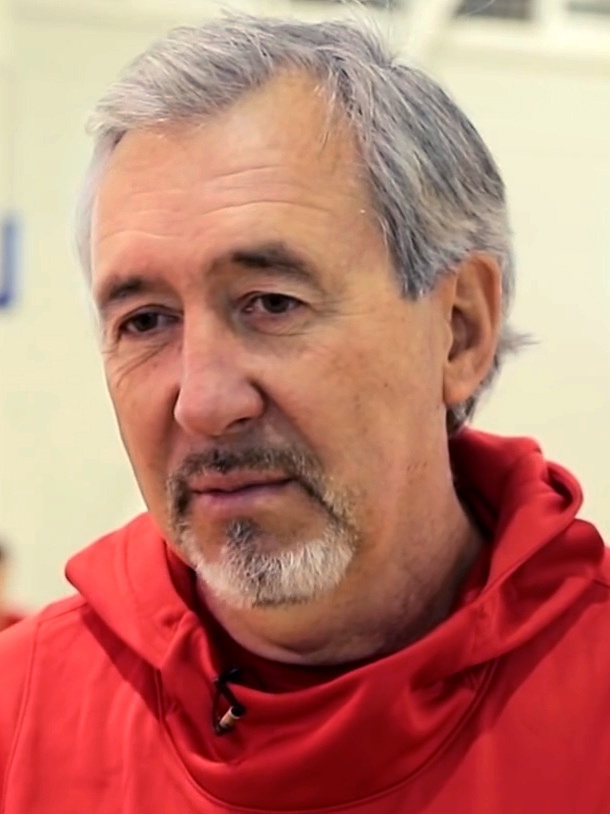
- Tarakanov in 2018

Personal information
- Born: 25 April 1958 (age 68) Lodeynoye Pole, Russian SFSR, Soviet Union
- Listed height: 6 ft 8 in (2.03 m)
- Listed weight: 212 lb (96 kg)

Career information
- NBA draft: 1980: undrafted
- Playing career: 1975–1992
- Position: Small forward / power forward
- Number: 6

Career history
- 1975–1979: Spartak Leningrad
- 1979–1990: CSKA Moscow
- 1990–1991: BSG Ludwigsburg
- 1991–1992: Liège Basket

Career highlights
- 7× Soviet League champion (1980–1984, 1988, 1990); 2× Soviet Cup winner (1978, 1982); Master of Sports of the USSR, international class (1981); Honored Master of Sports of the USSR (1981); Order of Friendship of Peoples (1988); Medal "For Distinguished Labour" (1988); Order of Honour (Russia) (2006)
- FIBA Hall of Fame
Medals
Men's basketball
Representing the Soviet Union
Olympic Games
Bronze medal – third place	1980 Moscow
Gold medal – first place	1988 Seoul
World Championships
Gold medal – first place	1982 Colombia
Silver medal – second place	1986 Spain
European Championships
Gold medal – first place	1979 Italy
Gold medal – first place	1981 Czechoslovakia
Bronze medal – third place	1983 France
Gold medal – first place	1985 West Germany
Silver medal – second place	1987 Greece
European U-18 Championships
Silver medal – second place	1976 Spain	Team

Sergei Nikolayevich Tarakanov (alternative spellings: Serguei, Sergey) (Russian: Серге́й Николаевич Тараканов; born 25 April 1958 in Lodeynoye Pole, Leningrad Oblast, Russian SFSR, USSR) is a Russian retired professional basketball player. During his playing career, he was a 2.03 m (6 ft 8 in) tall small forward-power forward.

== Club career ==
Tarakanov played at the club level with Spartak Leningrad (1975–1979), CSKA Moscow (1979–1990, winning 7 times the Soviet Basketball League championship), the German club Ludwisburg Stuttgart (1990–1991), and the Belgian club Liège Basket (1991–1992).

== National team career ==
Tarakanov was a member of the senior Soviet national team from 1979 to 1990. As a player of the Soviet national team, Tarakanov won: 3 gold medals at FIBA EuroBasket (1979, 1981, and 1985), the silver medal at EuroBasket 1987, the bronze medal at EuroBasket 1983, the gold medal at the 1982 FIBA World Championship, the silver medal at the 1986 FIBA World Championship, the gold medal at the 1988 Summer Olympic Games, and the bronze medal at the 1980 Summer Olympic Games.
