= Vladimir Zhigily =

Soviet basketball player

Personal information
- Born: 16 December 1952 (age 73) Oleksandrivka, Kharkiv, Ukraine, Soviet Union
Medal record
Men's Basketball
Representing the Soviet Union
Olympic Games
Bronze medal – third place	1976 Montreal	Team competition
Bronze medal – third place	1980 Moscow	Team competition

Vladimir Viktorovich Zhigily (Russian: Владимир Викторович Жигилий; 16 December 1952) is a retired Soviet basketball player who competed for the Soviet Union in the 1976 Summer Olympics and the 1980 Summer Olympics and won bronze medals.
