= Albert Valtin =

Soviet basketball player

Personal information
- Born: 17 November 1937 Kharkiv, Ukrainian SSR, Soviet Union
- Died: February 18, 2015 (aged 77)
Medal record
Men's basketball
Representing the Soviet Union
Olympic Games
Silver medal – second place	1960 Rome	Team competition

Albert Ivanovich Valtin (Russian: Альберт Иванович Вальтин; November 17, 1937 – February 18, 2015) was a Soviet basketball player who competed in the 1960 Summer Olympics and won a silver medal.
