= Ivan Edeshko =

Belarusian basketball player and coach (1945–2026)

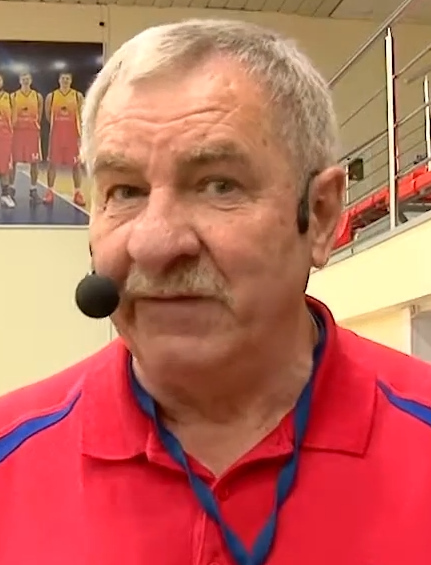
- Edeshko in 2017

Personal information
- Born: 25 March 1945 Stsiatski, Grodno Oblast, Byelorussian SSR, Soviet Union
- Died: 30 July 2026 (aged 81)
- Listed height: 6 ft 5 in (1.96 m)
- Listed weight: 200 lb (91 kg)

Career information
- NBA draft: 1967: undrafted
- Playing career: 1963–1981
- Position: Point guard
- Number: 9

Career history

Playing
- 1963–1970: Spartak Minsk
- 1971–1977: CSKA Moscow
- 1977–1979: SKA Kyiv
- 1979–1980: CSKA Moscow
- 1980–1981: SKA Kyiv

Coaching
- 1982–1987: Soviet Union (assistant)
- 1990–1992: CSKA Moscow

Career highlights
- As player: EuroLeague champion (1971); 2× FIBA European Selection (1972, 1973); 8× USSR League champion (1971–1974, 1976, 1977, 1979, 1980); 2× USSR Cup winner (1972, 1973); Honored Master of Sports of the USSR (1972); Order of the Badge of Honor USSR (1972); Medal For Labor Valor USSR (1982); Order of Honor Russia (2006)
Medals
Men's basketball
Representing Soviet Union
Olympic Games
Gold medal – first place	1972 Munich
Bronze medal – third place	1976 Montreal
FIBA World Cup
Gold medal – first place	Puerto Rico 1974
Silver medal – second place	Philippines 1978
FIBA EuroBasket
Gold medal – first place	1971 West Germany
Bronze medal – third place	1973 Spain
Silver medal – second place	1975 Yugoslavia
Gold medal – first place	1979 Italy

Ivan Ivanovich Edeshko (Belarusian: Іван Іванавіч Ядэшка, romanized: Ivan Ivanavich Yadeshka; Russian: Иван Иванович Едешко; 25 March 1945 – 30 July 2026) was a Soviet Belarusian professional basketball player and coach.

== Background ==
Ivan Ivanovich Edeshko was born in Stsiatski, Grodno Oblast, Byelorussian SSR, Soviet Union on 25 March 1945. He died on 30 July 2026, at the age of 81.

== Club career ==
During his club career, Edeshko trained at the Armed Forces sports society, in Moscow. He spent most of his career with CSKA Moscow.

== National team career ==
Edeshko won a gold medal with the senior Soviet national team at the 1972 Summer Olympics. In the gold medal game against the American national team, Edeshko's full-court length inbound pass led to Alexander Belov's game-winning basket with no time left on the game clock. The game's final score was 51–50.
