= Valery Miloserdov =

Russian basketball player

Personal information
- Born: August 11, 1951 Elektrostal, Russian SFSR, Soviet Union
- Died: January 26, 2015 (aged 63) Moscow, Russia
- Listed height: 1.87 m (6 ft 2 in)
- Listed weight: 85 kg (187 lb)

Career information
- Playing career: 1970–1982
- Position: Point guard
- Number: 6

Career history
- 1970–1982: CSKA Moscow

Career highlights
- EuroLeague champion (1971); 12× USSR League champion (1970–1974, 1976–1982); 2× USSR Cup winner (1972, 1973); 3× Spartakiad of the Peoples of the USSR winner (1971, 1975, 1979)
Medals
Men's basketball
Representing Soviet Union
Olympic Games
Bronze medal – third place	1976 Montreal	Team competition
Bronze medal – third place	1980 Moscow	Team competition
World Championships
Gold medal – first place	1974 Puerto Rico	Team
European Championships
Bronze medal – third place	1973 Spain	Team
Silver medal – second place	1975 Yugoslavia	Team
Silver medal – second place	1977 Belgium	Team
European U-18 Championship
Gold medal – first place	1968 Spain	Team
Gold medal – first place	1970 Greece	Team

Valery Vladimirovich Miloserdov (Russian: Валерий Владимирович Милосердов; August 11, 1951 – January 26, 2015) was a Russian basketball player who competed for the Soviet Union in the 1976 Summer Olympics and the 1980 Summer Olympics and won bronze medals.
