= Algirdas Lauritėnas =

Lithuanian basketball player (1932–2001)

Personal information
- Born: November 5, 1932 Kaunas, Lithuania
- Died: August 7, 2001 (aged 68) Kaunas, Lithuania

Sport
- Sport: Basketball
- Club: Žalgiris Kaunas
Medal record
Representing the Soviet Union
Olympic Games
Silver medal – second place	1956 Melbourne	USSR
FIBA EuroBasket
Gold medal – first place	1953 Moscow	USSR
Bronze medal – third place	1955 Budapest	USSR
Gold medal – first place	1957 Sofia	USSR

Algirdas Teodoras Lauritėnas (November 5, 1932 – August 7, 2001) was a Lithuanian basketball player. He was a member of the Soviet team during the 1950s, and won a silver medal at the 1956 Summer Olympics. He was also part of the team that became European champion in 1953 and 1957 and won a bronze medal in 1955.
