= Yuri Selikhov =

Russian basketball player

Personal information
- Nationality: Russian
- Born: 22 January 1943 (age 82)

Sport
- Sport: Basketball

Yuri Gennadievich Selikhov (born 22 January 1943) is a Russian basketball player. He competed in the men's tournament at the 1968 Summer Olympics.
