= Alzhan Zharmukhamedov =

Kazakh basketball player (1944–2022)

Personal information
- Born: 2 October 1944 South Kazakhstan Region, Kazakh SSR, USSR
- Died: 3 December 2022 (aged 78)
- Listed height: 6 ft 9.5 in (2.07 m)
- Listed weight: 210 lb (95 kg)

Career information
- Playing career: 1967–1980
- Position: Center

Career history
- 1967–1969: SKA Tashkent
- 1969–1980: CSKA Moscow
- 1981: Tashkent University

Career highlights
- As player: EuroLeague champion (1971); FIBA European Selection (1972); 10× USSR League champion (1970–1974, 1976–1980); 2× USSR Cup winner (1972, 1973); Master of Sports of the USSR (1971); Order of the Badge of Honour (Soviet Union) (1972); Order of Honour (Russia) (2006)
Medals
Representing Soviet Union
Men's basketball
Olympic Games
Gold medal – first place	1972 Munich
Bronze medal – third place	1976 Montreal
FIBA World Cup
Silver medal – second place	1978 Philippines
EuroBasket
Gold medal – first place	1967 Finland
Gold medal – first place	1971 West Germany
Gold medal – first place	1979 Italy
Silver medal – second place	1975 Yugoslavia
Silver medal – second place	1977 Belgium

Alzhan Musurbekuly Zharmukhamedov (alternate spelling: Alzan Zarmuhamedov) (Kazakh: Әлжан Мүсірбекұлы Жармұхамедов, Áljan Músirbekuly Jarmuhamedov; Russian: Алжан Мусурбекович Жармухамедов; 2 October 1944 – 3 December 2022) was a Kazakh professional basketball player and coach. He was considered to be the first ethnic Kazakh to become an Olympic champion.

== Playing career ==
Jarmuhamedov played club basketball with CSKA Moscow (1970–1980). In 1971, he earned the title of Master of Sports of the USSR, International Class, and a year later, he was awarded the Order of the Badge of Honor.

== National team career ==
While being young and driven by feelings of patriotism, Jarmuhamedov moved to Almaty (Alma-Ata at that time), in order to compete with the senior Kazakh SSR national basketball team. However, not being able to find any support, he finally decided to move to Moscow, where he was eventually able to earn world fame as a basketball player. He served as the team captain of the senior combined national basketball team of the Soviet Union for a long period. He won a gold medal at the 1972 Summer Olympic Games, while playing with the senior Soviet Union national basketball team.

== Coaching career ==
At the tail end of his career, Jarmuhamedov worked as a player-coach, until he reached the age of 45.

== Personal life and death ==
Zharmukhamedov's father was Kazakh and his mother was Ukrainian of Zaporozhian Cossack descent.

Zharmukhamedov lived in Moscow. He died on 3 December 2022, at the age of 78. He was buried in the Federal Military Memorial Cemetery on 7 December.

== Awards and accomplishments ==
=== Club career ===
- 10× USSR Premier League Champion: 1970, 1971, 1972, 1973, 1974, 1976, 1977, 1978, 1979, 1980
- FIBA European Champions Cup (EuroLeague) Champion: 1971
- 2× USSR Cup Winner: 1972, 1973
- FIBA European Selection: 1972

=== Soviet senior national team ===
- EuroBasket 1967: Gold
- 1970 FIBA World Championship: Bronze
- EuroBasket 1971: Gold
- 1972 Summer Olympic Games: Gold
- EuroBasket 1975: Silver
- 1976 Summer Olympic Games: Bronze:
- 1978 FIBA World Championship: Silver
- EuroBasket 1979: Gold
