= Andrey Lopatov =

Russian basketball player (1957–2022)

Personal information
- Born: 12 March 1957 Inta, Komi ASSR, Russian SFSR, Soviet Union
- Died: 16 February 2022 (aged 64)
- Listed height: 6 ft 9 in (2.06 m)
- Position: Small forward
Medals
Men's basketball
Representing Soviet Union
Olympic Games
Bronze medal – third place	1980 Moscow	Team competition
World Championships
Gold medal – first place	1982 Colombia
Silver medal – second place	1978 Philippines
Silver medal – second place	1990 Argentina
European Championships
Gold medal – first place	1979 Italy
Gold medal – first place	1981 Czechoslovakia
Gold medal – first place	1985 West Germany
Bronze medal – third place	1983 France
European U-18 Championships
Silver medal – second place	1976 Spain	Team

Andrey Vyacheslavovich Lopatov (Russian: Андрей Вячеславович Лопатов; 12 March 1957 – 16 February 2022) was a Russian basketball player who competed for the Soviet Union for many years and won a bronze medal at the 1980 Summer Olympics.

Lopatov died in February 2022, at the age of 64.
