= Mikheil Korkia =

Soviet basketball player

- Mikheil Korkia during basketball game

Personal information
- Born: 10 September 1948 Kutaisi, Georgian SSR, Soviet Union
- Died: 7 February 2004 (aged 55) Tbilisi, Georgia
- Listed height: 1.98 m (6 ft 6 in)
- Listed weight: 202 lb (92 kg)

Career information
- Playing career: 1965–1979
- Position: Shooting guard
- Coaching career: 1981–1983

Career history

Playing
- 1965-1979: Dinamo Tbilisi

Coaching
- 1980-1981: Dinamo Tbilisi
- 1982-1983: Dynamo Moscow
Medals
Men's basketball
Representing Soviet Union
Olympic Games
Gold medal – first place	1972 Munich	Team competition
Bronze medal – third place	1976 Montreal	Team competition
European Championships
Gold medal – first place	1971 West Germany	Soviet Union
Silver medal – second place	1975 Yugoslavia	Soviet Union
Silver medal – second place	1977 Belgium	Soviet Union
European Championship for Juniors
Gold medal – first place	1966 Italy	Team

Mikheil Korkia (Georgian: მიხეილ ქორქია) (10 September 1948 – 7 February 2004) was a Georgian-Soviet basketball player who won gold with the Soviet basketball team in Basketball at the 1972 Summer Olympics. He played for Dynamo Tbilisi.

== Trophies ==
- USSR Premier Basketball League (1): 1968
- USSR Basketball Cup (1): 1969
