= Tõnno Lepmets =

Estonian basketball player

Medal record

Men's basketball

Representing Soviet Union

EuroBasket
Gold medal – first place	Poland 1963	USSR
Gold medal – first place	Finland 1967	USSR

Tõnno Lepmets (March 31, 1938 in Tallinn, Estonia – June 26, 2005) was an Estonian professional basketball player, who competed for the Soviet Union. He won gold with the Soviet basketball team at the 1963 and 1967 EuroBasket. Elected to the Hall of fame of Estonian basketball in 2010. He was he long-time center (194 cm) of Estonian national team.

== Club career ==
Started playing basketball in 1956 as a member of Kalev Tallinn. 1957 he joined TPI basketball team (Tallinn Polytechnic Institute). After that he played for Kalev Tartu at the Championships of the Soviet Union in 1960–71.

== Achievements ==
=== National team ===
- European Championships: 1963, 1967

=== Club ===
- Estonian SSR Championship: 1961-1966, 1968, 1971, 1974
