= Anatoly Konev =

Russian basketball player

Personal information
- Born: 10 January 1921 Moscow, Russian SFSR
- Died: 9 November 1965 (aged 44) Moscow, Soviet Union
- Listed height: 198 cm (6 ft 6 in)

Career history
- CSKA Moscow
Medals
Men's basketball
Representing Soviet Union
Olympic Games
Silver medal – second place	1952 Helsinki
FIBA EuroBasket
Gold medal – first place	1947 Czechoslovakia
Gold medal – first place	1951 France
Gold medal – first place	1953 USSR
Bronze medal – third place	1955 Hungary

Anatoly Konstantinovich Konev (Russian: Анатолий Константинович Конев; 10 January 1921 – 9 November 1965) was a Russian basketball player. He trained at the Armed Forces sports society, in Moscow.

== Club career ==
Konev played club basketball with CSKA Moscow.

== National team career ==
Konev played with the senior Soviet Union national basketball team at the 1952 Summer Olympics, where he won a silver medal. He played in all eight of the Soviet Union's games.
