= Valery Goborov =

Soviet basketball player (1966–1989)

Medal record

Men's basketball

Representing the Soviet Union

Olympic Games
| Gold medal – first place | 1988 Seoul | USSR |
| Gold medal – first place | 1984 Sweden | U-18 Team |

Eurobasket
| Silver medal – second place | 1987 Athens | USSR |

Valery Grigoryevich Goborov (Ukrainian: Валерій Григорович Гоборов, Russian: Валерий Григорьевич Гоборов; 20 January 1966 – 7 September 1989) was a Soviet basketball player.

== Biography ==
Goborov was born in Kherson, Ukrainian SSR, USSR in 1966.

He won gold medal at 1988 Summer Olympics and was a champion of the USSR League (1988). He won a silver medal at Eurobasket 1987, in Athens, against Greece.

On 7 September 1989, he died in Moscow in a car crash.
