= Vladimir Torban =

Soviet basketball player

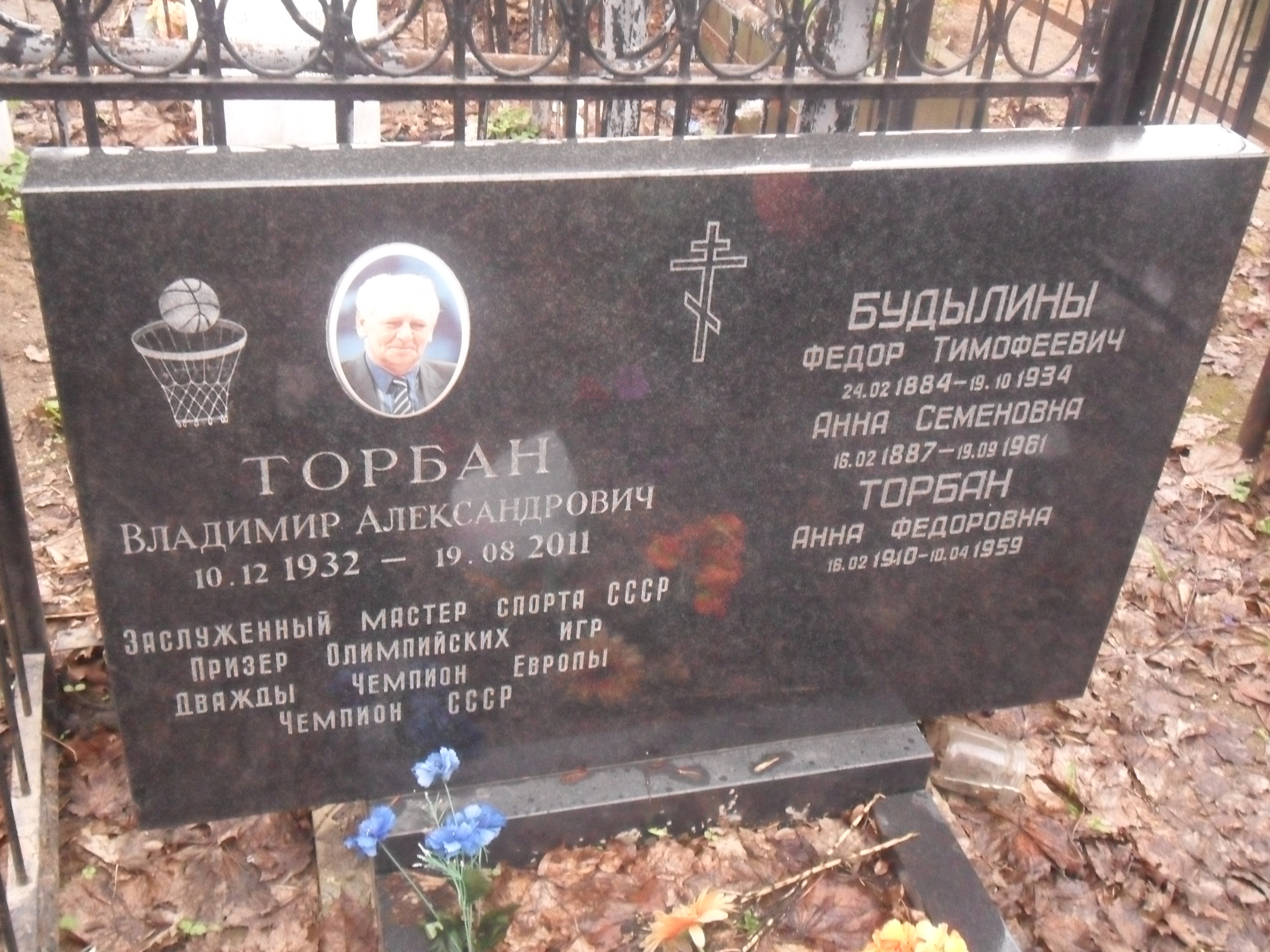
- Gravestone

Personal information
- Born: 10 December 1932 Moscow, Russian SFSR, Soviet Union
- Died: 19 August 2011 (aged 78)

Sport
- Sport: Basketball
- Club: Dynamo Moscow
Medal record
Representing the Soviet Union
Olympic Games
Silver medal – second place	1956 Melbourne	Team
FIBA EuroBasket
Bronze medal – third place	1955 Budapest	Team
Gold medal – first place	1957 Sofia	Team
Gold medal – first place	1959 Istanbul	Team

Vladimir Aleksandrovich Torban (Russian: Владимир Александрович Торбан; 10 December 1932 – 19 August 2011) was a Soviet basketball player. He trained as a tennis player in the 1940s and only in the 1950s started playing basketball for Dynamo Moscow. Between 1955 and 1959 he was a member of the Soviet team. In 1955, he won a gold medal at the Summer Universiade and a bronze medal at the EuroBasket 1955. Next year, he won a silver medal at the 1956 Summer Olympics. He became European champion in 1957 and 1959; in 1959, he also won a national title and competed at the world championship, where he held the highest live scoring rate (57%). However, his team was disqualified for refusing to play against Taiwan.
