= Aleksandr Salnikov =

Soviet basketball player

Personal information
- Born: 3 July 1949 Sevastopol, Russian SFSR
- Died: 17 November 2017 (aged 68) Kyiv, Ukraine
- Height: 198 cm (6 ft 6 in)
- Weight: 87 kg (192 lb; 13 st 10 lb)
Medal record
Men's Basketball
Representing the Soviet Union
Olympic Games
| Bronze medal – third place | 1976 Montreal | Soviet Union |
| Bronze medal – third place | 1980 Moscow | Soviet Union |
FIBA World Cup
| Gold medal – first place | 1974 Puerto Rico | Soviet Union |
| Silver medal – second place | 1978 Philippines | Soviet Union |

Aleksandr Petrovych Salnikov (Ukrainian: Олександр Петрович Сальников; 3 July 1949 – 17 November 2017) was a Ukrainian basketball player who competed for the Soviet Union in the 1976 Summer Olympics and the 1980 Summer Olympics.
