= Vyacheslav Khrynin =

Russian basketball player (1937–2021)

Personal information
- Born: 10 March 1937 Moscow, Soviet Union
- Died: 29 October 2021 (aged 84) Moscow, Russia
- Height: 1.82 m (6 ft 0 in)
- Weight: 60 kg (132 lb)

Sport
- Sport: Basketball
- Club: Dynamo Moscow
Medal record
Representing the Soviet Union
Olympic Games
| Silver medal – second place | 1964 Tokyo | Team |
FIBA Basketball World Cup
| Bronze medal – third place | 1963 Rio de Janeiro | Team |
FIBA EuroBasket
| Gold medal – first place | 1963 Wrocław | Team |
| Gold medal – first place | 1965 Moscow | Team |

Vyacheslav Aleksandrovich Khrynin (Russian: Вячеслав Александрович Хрынин; 10 March 1937 – 29 October 2021) was a Russian basketball player. Playing for the Soviet team he won a silver medal at the 1964 Summer Olympics, a bronze medal at the 1963 FIBA World Championship, and gold medals at the EuroBasket 1963 and EuroBasket 1965. After retirement he worked as a coach with Dynamo Moscow and a sports functionary with the Soviet basketball federation. Khrynin died on 29 October 2021, at the age of 84.
