= Anatoli Krikun =

Estonian basketball player

Personal information
- Born: 24 March 1948 (age 78) Tartu, then part of Estonian SSR, Soviet Union
- Listed height: 190 cm (6 ft 3 in)
- Listed weight: 87 kg (192 lb)

Career information
- Playing career: 1963–1986

Career history
- 1963–1967: EPA
- 1967–1974: TRÜ
- 1974–1975: KK Kalev
- 1976–1986: Standard
Medals
Men's basketball
Representing Soviet Union
Olympic Games
Bronze medal – third place	1968 Mexico	Team competition
World Championship
Bronze medal – third place	1970 Yugoslavia	USSR
EuroBasket
Gold medal – first place	1967 Finland	USSR

Anatoli Krikun (born 24 March 1948) is a retired Estonian professional basketball player, who competed for the Soviet Union.

== Achievements ==
=== National team ===
- Olympic Games: 1968
- World Championships: 1970
- European Championships: 1967

=== Club ===
- Estonian SSR Championship: 1969, 1970, 1973, 1980, 1982, 1983, 1986
