= Vladimir Kondrashin =

Russian basketball coach and player

Personal information
- Born: 14 January 1929 Leningrad, RSFSR, Soviet Union
- Died: 23 December 1999 (aged 70) Saint Petersburg, Russia
- Coaching career: 1967–1995

Career history

Playing
- Spartak Leningrad

Coaching
- 1967–1995: Spartak Leningrad / Spartak Saint Petersburg
- 1970, 1973: USSR University Team
- 1971–1976: USSR

Career highlights
- As player: Master of Sports of the USSR (1952); As head coach: 2× FIBA Saporta Cup champion (1973, 1975); Honored Coach of the USSR (1971); 2× Soviet / CIS League champion (1975, 1992); FIBA Order of Merit (1999); Contributor to Russian Basketball (2007)
- FIBA Hall of Fame
Medals
Men's basketball
Representing Soviet Union
Summer Olympics
Gold medal – first place	1972 Munich
Bronze medal – third place	1976 Montreal
FIBA World Cup
Gold medal – first place	1974 Puerto Rico
FIBA EuroBasket
Gold medal – first place	1971 West Germany
Bronze medal – third place	1973 Spain
Silver medal – second place	1975 Yugoslavia
World University Games
Gold medal – first place	1970 Italy
Silver medal – second place	1973 Soviet Union

Vladimir Petrovich Kondrashin (Russian: Владимир Петрович Кондрашин; 14 January 1929 in Leningrad, Soviet Union – 23 December 1999 in Saint Petersburg, Russia) was a Soviet and Russian professional basketball player and coach. He was inducted into the FIBA Hall of Fame in 2007.

== Playing career ==
Kondrashin played club basketball with Spartak Leningrad. As a player, he received the Master of Sports of the USSR award in 1952.

== Coaching career ==
=== Club level ===
At the club level, Kondrashin was the head coach of Spartak Leningrad (later named Spartak Saint Petersburg), from 1967 to 1995. With Spartak, he won the European-wide secondary level FIBA European Cup Winners' Cup, in 1973 and 1975, and the USSR / CIS League, in 1975 and 1992.

=== Soviet Union national basketball team ===
Kondrashin coached the senior men's Soviet Union national basketball team, from 1971 to 1976. He led them to their first Summer Olympics gold medal, at the 1972 Summer Olympics, when they beat the United States, in the 1972 Summer Olympics' controversial final game, on a last second shot by Alexander Belov. He also coached the Soviet Union to a gold medal at the 1974 FIBA World Championship, a bronze medal at the 1976 Summer Olympics, a gold medal at the EuroBasket 1971, a bronze medal at the EuroBasket 1973, and a silver medal at the EuroBasket 1975.

In addition to coaching the senior Soviet national team, he also coached the Soviet national university team, which he led to a gold medal at the 1970 World University Games, and a silver medal at the 1973 World University Games.

== Awards and accomplishments ==
- Master of Sports of the USSR: (1952)
- Honored Coach of the USSR: (1971)
- Order of the Red Banner of Labour: (1972)
- Order of the Badge of Honour: (1985)
- Order of Friendship of Peoples: (1985)
- Order of Friendship: (1995)
- FIBA Order of Merit: (1999)
- Honorary Citizen of St. Petersburg: (1999)
- Contributor to Russian Basketball: (2007)
- FIBA Hall of Fame: (2007)

== See also ==
- FIBA Basketball World Cup winning head coaches
- List of FIBA EuroBasket winning head coaches
