= Aleksandr Boloshev =

Soviet/Russian basketball player

Personal information
- Born: March 12, 1947 Elektrogorsk, Moscow Oblast, Russian SFSR, Soviet Union
- Died: July 16, 2010 (aged 63) Volgograd, Russia
- Listed height: 6 ft 9 in (2.06 m)
- Listed weight: 231 lb (105 kg)
- Position: Power forward
Medals
Men's basketball
Representing Soviet Union
Men's basketball
Olympic Games
Gold medal – first place	1972 Munich	Team
FIBA World Cup
Gold medal – first place	1974 Puerto Rico
Silver medal – second place	1978 Philippines
FIBA EuroBasket
Gold medal – first place	1969 Italy
Gold medal – first place	1971 West Germany
Bronze medal – third place	1973 Spain
Silver medal – second place	1975 Yugoslavia

Aleksandr Aleksandrovich Boloshev (Russian: Александр Александрович Болошев; 12 March 1947, Elektrogorsk, Moscow Oblast, USSR – 16 July 2010, Volgograd, Russia) was a Soviet and Russian basketball player who won gold with the Soviet basketball team in Basketball at the 1972 Summer Olympics. He trained at Dynamo in Moscow and played for Dynamo Moscow (1969–1980).
