= Sergei Kovalenko =

Sergey Ivanovich Kovalenko
Personal information
- Born: 11 August 1947 Lüshunkou, China; Under Soviet occupation
- Died: 18 November 2004 (aged 57) Kyiv, Ukraine
- Listed height: 7 ft 1 in (2.16 m)
- Listed weight: 245 lb (111 kg)
- Position: Center

Career history
- 1965–1968: Burevestnik
- 1976–1975: Budivelnyk
- 1976–1980: CSKA Moscow
Medals
Men's basketball
Representing Soviet Union
Olympic Games
Gold medal – first place	1972 Munich	USSR
Bronze medal – third place	1968 Mexico City	USSR
European Championship
Gold medal – first place	1969 Italy	USSR
Bronze medal – third place	1973 Spain	USSR
European Championship for Juniors
Gold medal – first place	1966 Italy	Team

Sergey Ivanovich Kovalenko (Russian: Серге́й Ива́нович Ковале́нко, Ukrainian: Сергій Іванович Коваленко; born 11 August 1947, died 18 November 2004 at age 57 in Kyiv) was a Soviet Ukrainian basketball player who won the gold medal with the Soviet basketball team in the 1972 Olympics. He played for CSKA Moscow (1976–1980).
