= Alexander Belov =

Soviet basketball player (1951–1978)

Personal information
- Born: 9 November 1951 Leningrad, Russian SFSR, Soviet Union
- Died: 3 October 1978 (aged 26) Leningrad, Russian SFSR, Soviet Union
- Listed height: 198 cm (6 ft 6 in)
- Listed weight: 105 kg (231 lb)

Career information
- NBA draft: 1975: 10th round, 161st overall pick
- Drafted by: New Orleans Jazz
- Playing career: 1967–1978
- Position: Center
- Number: 4,14

Career history
- 1967–1978: Spartak Leningrad

Career highlights
- As player: 2× FIBA European Selection (1971, 1972); 2× FIBA Saporta Cup champion (1973, 1975); Soviet League champion (1975); FIBA's 50 Greatest Players (1991); 101 Greats of European Basketball (2018)
- Stats at Basketball Reference
- FIBA Hall of Fame
Medals
Men's basketball
Representing the Soviet Union
Summer Olympic Games
Gold medal – first place	1972 Munich
Bronze medal – third place	1976 Montreal
FIBA World Cup
Gold medal – first place	1974 Puerto Rico
Bronze medal – third place	1970 Ljubljana
FIBA EuroBasket
Gold medal – first place	1969 Italy
Gold medal – first place	1971 West Germany
Silver medal – second place	1975 Yugoslavia
European U-18 Championship
Gold medal – first place	1968 Spain	Under-18
Gold medal – first place	1970 Greece	Under-18

Alexander Alexandrovich Belov, commonly known as Sasha Belov (November 9, 1951 – October 3, 1978), was a Soviet basketball player. During his playing career, he played at the center position. Belov is most remembered for scoring the game-winning basket of the gold medal game of the 1972 Munich Summer Olympic Games, which gave the gold medal to the senior Soviet national team. In 1978, at 26 years old, Belov died of cardiac sarcoma, a type of cancer.

Belov was named one of FIBA's 50 Greatest Players in 1991. He was enshrined into the FIBA Hall of Fame in 2007. In 2018, he was named one of the 101 Greats of European Basketball.

== Club career ==
Born in Leningrad, Belov was the star player of Spartak Leningrad (later known as Spartak St. Petersburg), as he led the club to the Soviet Union League title in 1975, and also to three European-wide 2nd-tier level FIBA European Cup Winners' Cup (Saporta Cup) Finals (1971, 1973, and 1975). Including winning the title in both 1973 and 1975. During his club career, Belov was a two-time FIBA European Selection (1971 and 1972).

In 2016, the club that Belov played for was renamed to Kondrashin Belov, for a short time. The club was renamed in honor of both Belov, and the club's former head coach Vladimir Kondrashin.

=== 1975 NBA draft ===
In the tenth round of the 1975 NBA draft, the New Orleans Jazz selected Belov with the 161st pick of the draft; like the vast majority of Soviet players drafted into North American sports leagues, he would never end up playing for the team that drafted him. It would not be until 1989, that the first Soviet player, Lithuanian-born Šarūnas Marčiulionis, would play in the National Basketball Association (NBA).

== National team career ==
Belov won four gold medals with the senior Soviet Union national team. While representing the USSR, Belov won gold medals at the 1969 EuroBasket, and the bronze medal at the 1970 FIBA World Championship. He also won the gold medal at the 1971 EuroBasket.

The highlight of Belov's career occurred during the 1972 Summer Olympic Games, when he scored the game-winning basket in the Olympic Basketball Final against Team USA, which gave the Soviet Union the gold medal. After that, he won the gold medal at the 1974 FIBA World Championship, the silver medal at the 1975 EuroBasket, and the bronze medal at the 1976 Summer Olympics.

== Life and death ==
Belov was born in Leningrad, Russian SFSR, Soviet Union, on 9 November 1951. Belov died in Leningrad on 3 October 1978, aged 26. His cause of death was cardiac sarcoma.

== See also ==
- List of basketball players who died during their careers
