= Zurab Sakandelidze =

Georgian basketball player

- Zurab Sakandelidze during a basketball game

Personal information
- Born: 9 August 1945 Kutaisi, Georgian SSR, Soviet Union
- Died: 25 January 2004 (aged 58) Tbilisi, Georgia
- Listed height: 6 ft 1.25 in (1.86 m)
- Listed weight: 179 lb (81 kg)
- Position: Point guard / Shooting guard
- FIBA Hall of Fame
Medals
Men's basketball
Representing the Soviet Union
Olympic Games
Gold medal – first place	Munich 1972	USSR
Bronze medal – third place	Mexico City 1968	USSR
FIBA World Cup
Gold medal – first place	1967 Montevideo	USSR
FIBA EuroBasket
Gold medal – first place	1965 Soviet Union	USSR
Gold medal – first place	1967 Finland	USSR
Gold medal – first place	1969 Italy	USSR
Gold medal – first place	1971 West Germany	USSR
Bronze medal – third place	1973 Spain	USSR
European Championship for Juniors
Gold medal – first place	1964 Italy	Team

Zurab Aleksandrovich Sakandelidze (Georgian: ზურაბ საკანდელიძე; Russian: Зураб Александрович Саканделидзе; 9 August 1945 – 25 January 2004) was a Georgian basketball player who won gold with the Soviet basketball team at the 1972 Summer Olympics. He was born in Kutaisi, and played for Dinamo Tbilisi. He died in Tbilisi.
