= Modestas Paulauskas =

Lithuanian professional basketball player and coach

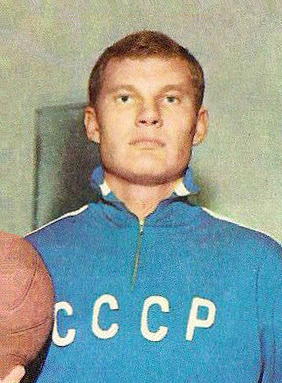
- Paulauskas in 1970, as a member of the USSR national team

Personal information
- Born: 19 March 1945 (age 81) Kretinga, Lithuania
- Listed height: 193 cm (6 ft 4 in)
- Listed weight: 93 kg (205 lb)

Career information
- Playing career: 1962–1976
- Position: Small forward
- Number: 5
- Coaching career: 1977–1998

Career history

Playing
- 1962–1976: Žalgiris Kaunas

Coaching
- 1991–1992: Žalgiris Kaunas
- 1997–1998: Statyba-Lietuvos rytas Vilnius

Career highlights
- As a player: EuroBasket MVP (1965); 7× Lithuanian Sportsman of the Year (1965–1967, 1969–1972); 3× FIBA European Selection (1969, 1971, 1972); FIBA's 50 Greatest Players (1991); No. 5 retired by Žalgiris Kaunas
- FIBA Hall of Fame
Medals
Men's basketball
Representing the Soviet Union
Summer Olympics
Gold medal – first place	1972 Munich
Bronze medal – third place	1968 Mexico City
FIBA World Cup
Gold medal – first place	1967 Uruguay
Gold medal – first place	1974 Puerto Rico
Bronze medal – third place	1970 Yugoslavia
FIBA Eurobasket
Gold medal – first place	1965 Soviet Union
Gold medal – first place	1967 Finland
Gold medal – first place	1969 Italy
Gold medal – first place	1971 West Germany
Bronze medal – third place	1973 Spain
Summer Universiade
Gold medal – first place	1970 Turin
Bronze medal – third place	1965 Budapest
European Championship for Juniors
Gold medal – first place	1964 Italy	Under-20

Modestas "Iron Modė" Paulauskas (Note: Lithuanian: Modestas Juozapas Paulauskas Russian: Модестас Йозапас Феликсович Паулаускас) (19 March 1945) is a Lithuanian former professional basketball player and coach.

As a player, he was the youngest EuroBasket MVP in history, being only 20 years old at the time he won the award. He is known for having been one of the best Lithuanian basketball players of all time, and for having excellent dribbling ability. He was selected as the Lithuanian Sportsman of the Year, a record seven times, in 1965–1967, and 1969–1972. He was a member of the Soviet Union team that won gold medal at the 1972 Summer Olympics and is now the last living player from the team.

In 1991, he was named one of FIBA's 50 Greatest Players.

In 2021, he was included into the FIBA Hall of Fame.

== Club career ==
Paulauskas spent his whole club career with Lithuanian teams: Neptūnas Klaipėda, Atletas Kaunas, Žalgiris Kaunas, despite getting attention from teams based in Western Europe and the National Basketball Association (NBA). He could not join them due to various reasons, one of such is Lithuania was part of the Soviet Union at that time, and it was very hard to travel abroad USSR. The other reason was he never actually wanted to leave his homeland – Lithuania. He was also asked to join Žalgiris Kaunas's main rival, CSKA Moscow, but he declined.

Paulauskas, nicknamed "Iron Modė", would often score half points for his team even before the introduction of the three-point line.

== National team career ==
Then just 20-year-old Paulauskas debuted in the senior Soviet Union men's national basketball team during the EuroBasket 1965, led the Soviet team to a EuroBasket title and was named the FIBA EuroBasket MVP (he is the all-time youngest player to receive this award). Subsequently, he won three more EuroBasket titles in the EuroBasket 1967, EuroBasket 1969, EuroBasket 1971, and a bronze medal in the EuroBasket 1973.

Paulauskas also was a part of the senior Soviet Union men's national basketball teams that won the bronze medal at the 1968 Summer Olympic Games, and the gold medal at the 1972 Summer Olympic Games. Paulauskas became the captain of the senior Soviet national team in 1969.

Moreover, Paulauskas two-times became a FIBA World Champion in the 1967 FIBA World Championship, 1974 FIBA World Championship, and won a bronze medal in the 1970 FIBA World Championship.

Paulauskas is the all-time most titled Lithuanian basketball player of the FIBA championships and Olympic Games.

== Coaching career ==
After retiring from playing basketball competitions, Paulauskas worked as a coach of the Soviet Union junior national teams from 1977 to 1989. In the early 1990s, he was the head coach of his native club, Žalgiris Kaunas. After that, he coached basketball in schools, both in Lithuania and in Russia.
