= 1962–63 FIBA European Champions Cup =

- League: FIBA European Champions Cup
- Sport: Basketball

Finals
- Champions: (Soviet Union) CSKA Moscow (2nd title)
- Runners-up: (Spain) Real Madrid

FIBA European Champions Cup seasons
- ← 1961–62 1963–64 →

The 1962–63 FIBA European Champions Cup was the sixth season of the European top-tier level professional basketball club competition FIBA European Champions Cup (now called EuroLeague). It was won by CSKA Moscow, after they beat Real Madrid in a three-legged EuroLeague Finals, after the two first games ended with an aggregate two-legged tie. CSKA won the third and decisive game, by a score of 99–80, and thus won its second European Champions Cup.

== Competition system ==
26 teams. European national domestic league champions, plus the then current FIBA European Champions Cup title holders only, playing in a tournament system. The finals were a two-game home-and-away aggregate.

== First round ==
Team 1	Agg.	Team 2	1st leg	2nd leg
Landlust (Netherlands)	124–166	(Poland) Wisła Kraków	67–76	57–90
Darüşşafaka (Turkey)	147–149	(Hungary) Honvéd	67–76	80–73
Vorwärts Leipzig (East Germany)	91–152	(Soviet Union) CSKA Moscow	51–82	40–70
Celtic (Northern Ireland)	75–226	(France) Alsace de Bagnolet	44–101	31–115
Maccabi Tel Aviv (Israel)	118–131	(Socialist Federal Republic of Yugoslavia) AŠK Olimpija	46–60	72–71
Stade Français Genève (Switzerland)	104–133	(West Germany) Alemannia Aachen	45–60	59–73
Alliance Sports Casablanca (Morocco)	60–110*	(Italy) Simmenthal Milano	60–110	
Benfica (Portugal)	108–207	(Spain) Real Madrid	61–97	47–110
KFUM Söder (Sweden)	125–145	(Finland) Helsingin Kisa-Toverit	59–73	66–72
Antwerpse (Belgium)	131–169	(Czechoslovakia) Spartak ZJŠ Brno	74–81	57–88
SISU (Denmark)	98–134	(Luxembourg) Etzella	55–72	43–62

*series decided over one game in Casablanca.

== Second round ==
Team 1	Agg.	Team 2	1st leg	2nd leg
Levski-Spartak (Bulgaria)	104–177	(Soviet Union) CSKA Moscow	55–83	49–94
Honvéd (Hungary)	137–126	(Romania) Steaua București	74–73	63–53
Alsace de Bagnolet (France)	174–189	(Socialist Federal Republic of Yugoslavia) AŠK Olimpija	80–61	94–128
Alemannia Aachen (West Germany)	120–145	(Italy) Simmenthal Milano	67–69	53–76
Panathinaikos (Greece)	133–187	(Spain) Real Madrid	73–97	60–90
Helsingin Kisa-Toverit (Finland)	142–172	(Czechoslovakia) Spartak ZJŠ Brno	83–87	59–85
Etzella (Luxembourg)	105–198	(Poland) Wisła Kraków	52–83	53–115

Automatically qualified to the quarter-finals

- (Soviet Union) Dinamo Tbilisi (title holder)

== Quarterfinals ==
Team 1	Agg.	Team 2	1st leg	2nd leg
AŠK Olimpija (Socialist Federal Republic of Yugoslavia)	158–162	(Czechoslovakia) Spartak ZJŠ Brno	86–83	72–79
Honvéd (Hungary)	170–170*	(Spain) Real Madrid	101–96	69–74
Dinamo Tbilisi (Soviet Union)	139–138	(Italy) Simmenthal Milano	65–70	74–68
Wisła Kraków (Poland)	122–152	(Soviet Union) CSKA Moscow	75–72	47–80

*A tie-break was played in Madrid on 2 April 1963: Real Madrid – Honvéd 77–65.

== Semifinals ==
Team 1	Agg.	Team 2	1st leg	2nd leg
Spartak ZJŠ Brno (Czechoslovakia)	146–150	(Spain) Real Madrid	79–60	67–90
Dinamo Tbilisi (Soviet Union)	137–155	(Soviet Union) CSKA Moscow	59–76	78–79

== Finals ==
Team 1	Agg.	Team 2	1st leg	2nd leg	3rd leg
Real Madrid (Spain)	240–259	(Soviet Union) CSKA Moscow	86–69	74–91	80–99*

First leg Fiesta Alegre fronton;Attendance 5,000, 23 July 1963

Second leg Lenin Palace of Sports;Attendance 20,000, 31 July 1963

*Third leg Lenin Palace of Sports;Attendance 20,000, 1 August 1963, Moscow, Soviet Union

1962–63 FIBA European Champions Cup
Champions

CSKA Moscow
2nd Title

== Awards ==
=== FIBA European Champions Cup Finals Top Scorer ===
- (Spain) Emiliano Rodríguez ( (Spain) Real Madrid)
