= FIBA European Champions Cup and EuroLeague history =

== Champions ==
=== FIBA European Champions Cup (1958–1991) ===
Season	Country	Club
1958	(Soviet Union)	Rīgas ASK
1958–59	(Soviet Union)	Rīgas ASK
1959–60	(Soviet Union)	Rīgas ASK
1960–61	(Soviet Union)	CSKA Moscow
1961–62	(Soviet Union)	Dinamo Tbilisi
1962–63	(Soviet Union)	CSKA Moscow
1963–64	(Spain)	Real Madrid
1964–65	(Spain)	Real Madrid
1965–66	(Italy)	Simmenthal Milano
1966–67	(Spain)	Real Madrid
1967–68	(Spain)	Real Madrid
1968–69	(Soviet Union)	CSKA Moscow
1969–70	(Italy)	Ignis Varese
1970–71	(Soviet Union)	CSKA Moscow
1971–72	(Italy)	Ignis Varese
1972–73	(Italy)	Ignis Varese
1973–74	(Spain)	Real Madrid
1974–75	(Italy)	Ignis Varese
1975–76	(Italy)	Mobilgirgi Varese
1976–77	(Israel)	Maccabi Tel Aviv
1977–78	(Spain)	Real Madrid
1978–79	(Socialist Federal Republic of Yugoslavia)	Bosna
1979–80	(Spain)	Real Madrid
1980–81	(Israel)	Maccabi Tel Aviv
1981–82	(Italy)	Squibb Cantù
1982–83	(Italy)	Ford Cantù
1983–84	(Italy)	Banco di Roma Virtus
1984–85	(Socialist Federal Republic of Yugoslavia)	Cibona
1985–86	(Socialist Federal Republic of Yugoslavia)	Cibona
1986–87	(Italy)	Tracer Milano
1987–88	(Italy)	Tracer Milano
1988–89	(Socialist Federal Republic of Yugoslavia)	Jugoplastika
1989–90	(Socialist Federal Republic of Yugoslavia)	Jugoplastika
1990–91	(Socialist Federal Republic of Yugoslavia)	Pop 84

=== FIBA European League (1991–1996) ===
Season	Country	Club
1991–92	(Federal Republic of Yugoslavia)	Partizan
1992–93	(France)	Limoges CSP
1993–94	(Spain)	7up Joventut
1994–95	(Spain)	Real Madrid
1995–96	(Greece)	Panathinaikos

=== FIBA EuroLeague (1996–2000) ===
Season	Country	Club
1996–97	(Greece)	Olympiacos
1997–98	(Italy)	Kinder Bologna
1998–99	(Lithuania)	Žalgiris
1999–00	(Greece)	Panathinaikos

=== FIBA SuproLeague (2000–2001) ===
Season	Country	Club
2000–01	(Israel)	Maccabi Tel Aviv

=== Euroleague (2000–2016) ===
Season	Country	Club
2000–01	(Italy)	Kinder Bologna
2001–02	(Greece)	Panathinaikos
2002–03	(Spain)	FC Barcelona
2003–04	(Israel)	Maccabi Tel Aviv
2004–05	(Israel)	Maccabi Tel Aviv
2005–06	(Russia)	CSKA Moscow
2006–07	(Greece)	Panathinaikos
2007–08	(Russia)	CSKA Moscow
2008–09	(Greece)	Panathinaikos
2009–10	(Spain)	Regal FC Barcelona
2010–11	(Greece)	Panathinaikos
2011–12	(Greece)	Olympiacos
2012–13	(Greece)	Olympiacos
2013–14	(Israel)	Maccabi Tel Aviv
2014–15	(Spain)	Real Madrid
2015–16	(Russia)	CSKA Moscow

=== EuroLeague (2016–present) ===
Season	Country	Club
2016–17	(Turkey)	Fenerbahçe
2017–18	(Spain)	Real Madrid
2018–19	(Russia)	CSKA Moscow
2019–20	Cancelled due to the COVID-19 pandemic	
2020–21	(Turkey)	Anadolu Efes
2021–22	(Turkey)	Anadolu Efes
2022–23	(Spain)	Real Madrid
2023–24	(Greece)	Panathinaikos AKTOR
2024–25	(Turkey)	Fenerbahce

== FIBA European Champions Cup for men's clubs – origins and early history (1958–1960) ==
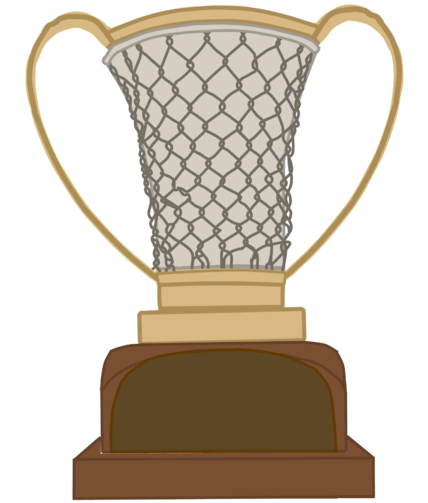

L'Équipe is widely credited for birthing the idea of a European club competition, first and foremost, in European football. Basketball was soon to latch onto the quickly successful idea, and the concept was discussed by FIBA, during the 1957 FIBA EuroBasket, in Bulgaria. Then FIBA Secretary General William Jones, set up a commission consisting of Borislav Stanković (Yugoslavia), Raimundo Saporta (Spain), Robert Busnel (France), Miloslav Kříž (Czechoslovakia), and Nikolai Semashko (Soviet Union), to come up with a proposal.

The commission invited Europe's national basketball federations to send their national domestic league champions, L'Equipe donated a trophy, and in 1958, the FIBA European Cup For Men's Champion Clubs, or, FIBA European Champions' Cup, started, with the inaugural 1958 FIBA European Champions Cup season.

Clubs from Eastern Europe (from the former Soviet bloc) dominated the early years of the competition. They not only won the first six editions of the competition (Rīgas ASK three times, CSKA Moscow twice, and Dinamo Tbilisi once), but also managed to reach the finals as runners-up four times in the first six years (Academic twice, Dinamo Tbilisi once, and Rīgas ASK once).

The 2.18 m (7 ft 2 in) tall Soviet player Jānis Krūmiņš, was the man in the middle for Rīgas ASK's initial league three-peat championship, as he was an unmatched dominant force around the basket.

== The 1960s, Real Madrid and CSKA Moscow rise ==
In the 1960–61 season, things began to change. The main Western European basketball club, Real Madrid, started to show signs of ambition, and was eliminated only after the semifinals, by Rīgas ASK.

The following two years, the Spanish Primera División champions, Real Madrid, found their way to the final game, but lost both times, versus Dinamo Tbilisi (1961–62 season) and CSKA Moscow (1962–63 season). Eventually, Real won the first of its ten European crowns in the 1963–64 season, by beating the Czechs of Spartak ZJŠ Brno in the final.

However, that same season, the USSR Premier League champions did not participate, because the senior Soviet Union national team (made up of 90% of the players from CSKA) was preparing for the 1964 Summer Olympic Games. Anyway, this season was a big twist for European club basketball, as it marked the beginning of the domination of the "wealthy" Western European clubs.

In the 1965–66 season, Olimpia Milano, then known for sponsorship reasons as Simmenthal Milano, was in part led to championship by a young and smart American small forward: Bill Bradley, who would later become an NBA champion in 1970 and 1973, with the New York Knicks. Still later, Bradley would become a senator for the state of New Jersey and, finally, a candidate for the United States Presidency. Bradley, who was studying at Oxford, as a Rhodes Scholar, took advantage of his year in Europe, to give decisive help to Milano.

Real Madrid won the 1967–68 season's final. Real Madrid could rely on players like Clifford Luyk, who was the competition's first naturalized American player with such a big role on a team, Emiliano Rodríguez, Miles Aiken, Bob Burgess, and later Wayne Brabender. In the 1968–69 season's final, CSKA Moscow, inspired by the talented player Sergei Belov, managed to beat Real Madrid in Barcelona in the final. The young Belov had 19 points that night, but his teammate, the big 2.15 m (7 ft 1 in) tall center Vladimir Andreev, exploded for 37 points in the game.

== The 1970s, Varese–Meneghin Dynasty ==
After the dynasties of the Soviet clubs and Real Madrid, the 1970s were, without any doubt, the decade of the Italian League club Varese.

Varese found a way, year after year, to reach the final game of the competition. In fact, Varese played in all ten of the league's finals in the 1970s decade, and they won five of them. Real Madrid, CSKA Moscow, the Yugoslav club Bosna Sarajevo, and the Israeli club Maccabi Tel Aviv, were the other champions of the decade.

At that time, Varese was led in part by the legendary center, Dino Meneghin, whom was surrounded by other players such as, one of the best scorers in Italian League history, Bob Morse, the Mexican shooter Manuel Raga, Ottorino Flaborea, John Fultz, Ivan Bisson, etc.

In the 1970–71 season's final, CSKA Moscow won its last top-tier European title, until they finally won it again in the year 2006. They beat Varese (or Ignis Varese for sponsorship reasons) in the final, thanks to Sergei Belov's 24 points. Varese, after a tough win in the championship game against Jugoplastika Split in the 1971–72 season's final, won the championship one more time, against CSKA in the 1972–73 season's final. They won the title despite the play of Sergei Belov. Belov, was once again the final's top scorer, with 36 points scored in the 1973 championship game.

In the 1973–74 season final, Ignis Varese, after almost securing the win, was upset by Real Madrid, on an unbelievable late surge, led by Wayne Brabender and Carmelo Cabrera.

In 1976–77 season's final, the Israeli Super League champions Maccabi Tel Aviv, whose leaders Jim Boatwright and Miki Berkovich, combined for 43 points against Mobilgirgi Varese, won the first of their six European-wide crowns, which was a big surprise to the world of European club basketball. Finally, in the 1978–79 season's final, the Yugoslavian First Federal League's school of basketball began to dazzle Europe. Bosna Sarajevo, led by a young head coach (32 years old) named Bogdan Tanjević, beat Emerson Varese, in the final at Grenoble, France. The great performances in the game of the club's shooters, Žarko Varajić (45 points), and Mirza Delibašić (30 points), gave Yugoslavia its first top-tier European club title.

== The 1980s, Italian and Yugoslav dominance ==
What could have been the decade of Maccabi Tel Aviv (six finals appearances, but only one win), eventually became a triumph for Italian League basketball clubs (seven finals appearances, and five wins).

Italy's top league managed to generate three different European club champions (Cantù, Virtus Roma, and Olimpia Milano) in only seven years. The 1980s decade was also marked by the definitive emergence of the elegant and inspired Yugoslav First Federal League's style of basketball play. First, the Yugoslav club Cibona Zagreb, led by the phenomenal scorer Dražen Petrović, won the league's final two times in a row (in 1985 and 1986). After that, the Yugoslav club Split Croatia, won three consecutive titles (in 1989, 1990 and 1991), and revealed the talent of its star players Dino Rađa, Toni Kukoč, and others, like (Zoran Savić, Zoran Sretenović, Velimir Perasović, Duško Ivanović, Žan Tabak, Goran Sobin, Luka Pavićević,...).

In the 1982 Final and the 1983 Final, Cantù, the traditional runner-up to the mighty Varese in the Italian League, won back-to-back championships, thanks to the young scorer Antonello Riva, who scored 16 points in the first final, and then 18 points in the second final. The former Varese star, Dino Meneghin, who had since joined Olimpia Milano, had imported his winning tradition to the Capital of Lombardy, to play in his eleventh European Final in 1983. However, he eventually lost the game, in what seemed like a wrestling match between him Wallace Bryant of Ford Cantù, in what was one of the most physical and "ugliest" finals of all time.

After Cantù's back-to-back championships, Banco di Roma Virtus won the league's title following year. Its American player, Larry Wright led the way in the 1984 Final, as he scored 27 points in the game. Following that was the reign of Cibona Zagreb, and the club's player, marvelous Dražen Petrović.

"Little Mozart", as Petrović was nicknamed, scored 36 points against Real Madrid in the 1985 championship game, and then added 22 points against Arvydas Sabonis and Žalgiris Kaunas in the final a year later. Italy got back to its back-to-back title tradition in 1987, and 1988, as Olimpia Milano, then bearing the sponsorship name of Tracer Milano, beat Maccabi Tel Aviv Elite twice in the finals. Then, in the 1989 Final, the wonderful generation of Jugoplastika Split (Kukoč, Rađa, Perasović, Savić, etc.) took over, and dominated European club basketball, as the team won three straight championships.

== The 1990s, the Greek rise ==
Prior to the 1991–92 season, the league changed its name from the FIBA European Champions Cup, to the FIBA European League. It then changed its name again prior to the 1996–97 season, to the FIBA EuroLeague, which marked the first use of the name EuroLeague, in the competition's history. The 1990s decade saw two of the most exciting and controversial endings in the history of the competition.

In the 1992 Final, Partizan Belgrade's young duo of Sasha Djordjević and Sasha Danilović, led the underdog team to a title, which was the fourth consecutive title for a Yugoslav Federal League club. Danilović was named the EuroLeague Final Four MVP, but it was Djordjević's last second, coast-to-coast three-pointer, which lifted Partizan to a 71–70 victory against the Spanish club Montigalà Joventut Badalona.

The following 1993 Final saw another underdog take the league's title, as the French League club Limoges CSP, stunned the Toni Kukoč-led club of Benetton Treviso, in the title game.

In the 1994 Final, 7up Joventut Badalona made up for their last second defeat against Partizan Belgrade two years earlier. That time, it was the Spanish League club's turn to stage a late rally, which came against an Olympiacos Piraeus team with the regular season's best record. Joventut power forward Corny Thompson, hit a three-pointer (just his fifth of the entire season), to put his team up by 2-points, with 19 seconds remaining in the game.

Olympiacos Piraeus had a chance to tie the game at the free throw line, but the Yugoslavian national team star Žarko Paspalj, only made one of two free throws, and the "La Penya" club held on for the win.

The title stayed in Spain after the 1995 Final, but that time with Real Madrid. Arvydas Sabonis, led Real Madrid to victory over Olympiacos Piraeus in the final, and he won the only major European club honor that had eluded him up to that point, before going on to play in the NBA.

The 1996 Final proved to be one of the most controversial finals of any European club competition. The Greek Basket League club Panathinaikos Athens, pulled off the coup of the offseason, by signing former NBA star Dominique Wilkins, but it was the Croatian center Stojko Vranković, who decided the outcome of that season's EuroLeague Final Four.

Vranković, a 2.18 m (7 ft 2 in) tall center, ran the length of the court, to block FC Barcelona's Jose Antonio Montero's lay-up attempt, in the last second, to seal the finals win for Panathinaikos Athens. Although the block looked like a possible goal-tend, no call was made, and Panathinaikos Athens became the first ever champions from the Greek League. Although this would seem to indicate that a goal tend call should have been made, the situation is less than clear. In fact, numerous violations occurred in the last seconds of the game, none of which were called by the referees. Panathinaikos had possession of the ball, and with 8 seconds remaining on the game clock, Panathinaikos point guard Panagiotis Giannakis lost possession of the ball (possibly after being fouled, though no foul call was made). As players from both teams struggled to gain possession of the ball, the shot clock was renewed illegally (since the ball was in possession of neither team, a shot clock violation should have been called against Panathinaikos, meaning that the game clock should have been stopped, and Barcelona should have been given the ball, with an upcoming inbound pass). The situation was further exacerbated, by the fact that the game clock stuck at 4.9 seconds for about 6 seconds, thus allowing Barcelona nearly 10 seconds of play.

Olympiacos Piraeus continued Greek supremacy over the EuroLeague the following season, after they won the 1997 Final. Olympiacos had previously lost in the finals in both 1994 and 1995, but their 1996 summer signee David Rivers, proved to be the difference in the 1997 Final Four. Rivers averaged 27 points in the two games of the Final Four, and Olympiacos beat FC Barcelona and it's stars Sasha Djordjević and Artūras Karnišovas in the final, to win their first ever EuroLeague title.

In the first ten years after the EuroLeague Final Four format had been re-introduced with the 1988 EuroLeague Final Four, the club with the best record of each regular season had never gone on to won the title. That finally changed with the 1998 Final, when Kinder Bologna accomplished the feat. That same year, a Greek team, AEK Athens, came in second place; their head coach was Giannis Ioannidis, who had reached the EuroLeague Final Four three times previously with another Greek team, Aris Thessaloniki, in 1988, 1989, and 1990.

== Top scoring performances in EuroLeague Finals games ==
- The top scoring performances in EuroLeague Finals games:
1. (Socialist Federal Republic of Yugoslavia) Žarko Varajić (Bosna) 47 points vs. Emerson Varese (in 1978–79 Final)
2. (Soviet Union) Vladimir Andreev (CSKA Moscow) 37 points vs. Real Madrid (in 1968–69 Final)
3. (Socialist Federal Republic of Yugoslavia) Dražen Petrović (Cibona) 36 points vs. Real Madrid (in 1984–85 Final)
4. (Soviet Union) Sergei Belov (CSKA Moscow) 34 points vs. Ignis Varese (in 1972–73 Final)
5. (United States) Steve Chubin (Simmenthal Milano) 34 points vs. Real Madrid (in 1966–67 Final)
6. (United States) Earl Williams (Maccabi Tel Aviv) 31 points vs. Real Madrid (in 1979–80 Final)
7. (Spain) Emiliano Rodríguez (Real Madrid) 31 points vs. Spartak ZJŠ Brno (in first leg of 1963–64 Finals)
8. (Spain) Juan Antonio San Epifanio (FC Barcelona) 31 points vs. Banco di Roma Virtus (in 1983–84 Final)
9. (United States) Wayne Hightower (Real Madrid) 30 points vs. Dinamo Tbilisi (in 1961–62 Final)
10. (Socialist Federal Republic of Yugoslavia) Mirza Delibašić (Bosna) 30 points vs. Emerson Varese (in 1978–79 Final)
11. (Spain) Clifford Luyk (Real Madrid) 30 points vs. CSKA Moscow (in first leg of 1964–65 Finals)
12. (Czechoslovakia) František Konvička (Spartak ZJŠ Brno) 30 points vs. Real Madrid (in first leg of 1963–64 Finals)

== See also ==
- Rosters of the champion and finalist teams of EuroLeague
