= Soviet basketball clubs in international competitions =

Soviet basketball clubs in European and worldwide competitions is the performance record of men's professional basketball clubs from the former Soviet Union's top-tier level league, the USSR Premier League, in international competitions.

== The finals ==
Season	Champion	Result	Runner-up	Date	Venue	
FIBA European Champions Cup & EuroLeague (1st tier)
1958	Rīgas ASK (Soviet Union)	170–152 (two-leg)	(Bulgaria) Academic	06 & 19/07/1958	Daugava Stadion, Riga	Vasil Levski National Stadium, Sofia
1958–59	Rīgas ASK (Soviet Union)	148–125 (two-leg)	(Bulgaria) Academic	22 & 28/06/1959	Daugava Stadion, Riga	Vasil Levski National Stadium, Sofia
1959–60	Rīgas ASK (Soviet Union)	130–113 (two-leg)	(Soviet Union) Dinamo Tbilisi	10 & 15/05/1960	Dinamo Stadion, Tbilisi	Daugava Stadion, Riga
1960–61	CSKA Moscow (Soviet Union)	148–128 (two-leg)	(Soviet Union) Rīgas ASK	10 & 15/05/1960	Daugava Stadion, Riga	Lenin Stadion, Moscow
1961–62	Dinamo Tbilisi (Soviet Union)	90–83	(Spain) Real Madrid	29/06/1962	Patinoire des Vernets, Geneva	
1962–63	CSKA Moscow (Soviet Union)	259–240 (three-leg)	(Spain) Real Madrid	23/07, 31/07 & 01/08/1963	Frontón Vista Alegre, Madrid	Lenin Palace of Sports, Moscow
1964–65	Real Madrid (Spain)	157–150 (two-leg)	(Soviet Union) CSKA Moscow	08 & 14/04/1965	Lenin Palace of Sports, Moscow	Frontón Vista Alegre, Madrid
1968–69	CSKA Moscow (Soviet Union)	103–99	(Spain) Real Madrid	24/04/1969	Palau dels Esports, Barcelona	
1969–70	Ignis Varese (Italy)	79–74	(Soviet Union) CSKA Moscow	09/04/1970	Sportska Dvorana Skenderija, Sarajevo	
1970–71	CSKA Moscow (Soviet Union)	67–53	(Italy) Ignis Varese	08/04/1971	Arena Deurne, Antwerp	
1972–73	Ignis Varese (Italy)	71–66	(Soviet Union) CSKA Moscow	22/03/1973	Country Hall du Sart Tilman, Liège	
1985–86	Cibona (Socialist Federal Republic of Yugoslavia)	94–82	(Soviet Union) Žalgiris	03/04/1986	Sportcsarnok, Budapest	
FIBA Saporta Cup (2nd tier)
1968–69	Slavia VŠ Praha (Czechoslovakia)	80–74	(Soviet Union) Dinamo Tbilisi	17/04/1969	Wiener Stadthalle, Vienna	
1970–71	Simmenthal Milano (Italy)	127–118 (two-leg)	(Soviet Union) Spartak Leningrad	30/03 & 07/04/1971	Armija Dvorets, Leningrad	PalaLido, Milan
1972–73	Spartak Leningrad (Soviet Union)	77–62	(Socialist Federal Republic of Yugoslavia) Jugoplastika	20/03/1973	Alexandreio Melathron, Thessaloniki	
1974–75	Spartak Leningrad (Soviet Union)	63–62	(Socialist Federal Republic of Yugoslavia) Crvena zvezda	26/03/1975	Palais des Sports de Beaulieu, Nantes	
1984–85	FC Barcelona (Spain)	77–73	(Soviet Union) Žalgiris	19/03/1985	Palais des Sports, Grenoble	

== FIBA European Champions Cup (1st-tier) ==
=== Season to season ===
Year	Team	_______ Earlier stage _______	________ Last 24 to 32 ________	________ Last 12 to 16 ________	_________ Last 6 to 8 _________	_________ Semifinals _________	____________ Final ____________
1958	Rīgas ASK			(East Germany) Wissenschaft Berlin	(Poland) Legia Warszawa	(Spain) Real Madrid	(Bulgaria) Academic
1958–59	Rīgas ASK				(Hungary) Honvéd	(Poland) Lech Poznań	(Bulgaria) Academic
1959–60	Rīgas ASK				(Socialist Federal Republic of Yugoslavia) AŠK Olimpija	(Czechoslovakia) Slovan Orbis Praha	(Soviet Union) Dinamo Tbilisi
1959–60	Dinamo Tbilisi			(Romania) Steaua București	(Bulgaria) Academic	(Poland) Polonia Warszawa	(Soviet Union) Rīgas ASK
1960–61	CSKA Moscow			(France) Étoile Charleville-Mézières	(Poland) Legia Warszawa	(Romania) Steaua București	(Soviet Union) Rīgas ASK
1960–61	Rīgas ASK				(Israel) Hapoel Tel Aviv	(Spain) Real Madrid	(Soviet Union) CSKA Moscow
1961–62	CSKA Moscow				(Czechoslovakia) Iskra Svit	(Soviet Union) Dinamo Tbilisi	
1961–62	Dinamo Tbilisi			(Romania) Steaua București	(Turkey) Darüşşafaka	(Soviet Union) CSKA Moscow	(Spain) Real Madrid
1962–63	CSKA Moscow		(East Germany) Vorwärts Leipzig	(Bulgaria) Levski-Spartak	(Poland) Wisła Kraków	(Soviet Union) Dinamo Tbilisi	(Spain) Real Madrid
1962–63	Dinamo Tbilisi				(Italy) Simmenthal Milano	(Soviet Union) CSKA Moscow	
1963–64
1964–65	CSKA Moscow				(Poland) Wisła Kraków	(Italy) Ignis Varese	(Spain) Real Madrid
1965–66	CSKA Moscow				1st of 4 teams	(Italy) Simmenthal Milano	(Greece) AEK
1966–67
1967–68
1968–69	CSKA Moscow			(East Germany) Vorwärts Leipzig	2nd of 4 teams	(Czechoslovakia) Spartak ZJŠ Brno	(Spain) Real Madrid
1969–70	CSKA Moscow				1st of 4 teams	(Czechoslovakia) Slavia VŠ Praha	(Italy) Ignis Varese
1970–71	CSKA Moscow			(Hungary) Honvéd	1st of 4 teams	(Czechoslovakia) Slavia VŠ Praha	(Italy) Ignis Varese
1971–72
1972–73	CSKA Moscow			(Switzerland) Stade Français Genève	1st of 4 teams	(Socialist Federal Republic of Yugoslavia) Crvena zvezda	(Italy) Ignis Varese
1973–74
1974–75	CSKA Moscow			6th of 6 teams			
1975–76
1976–77	CSKA Moscow		1st of 4 teams	Bye	3rd of 6 teams		
1977–78
1978–79
1979–80
1980–81	CSKA Moscow		1st of 4 teams	Bye	6th of 6 teams		
1981–82	CSKA Moscow		2nd of 4 teams				
1982–83	CSKA Moscow		(Denmark) BMS	(Finland) Turun NMKY	4th of 6 teams		
1983–84
1984–85	CSKA Moscow		(Luxembourg) T71 Dudelange	(France) Limoges CSP	4th of 6 teams		
1985–86	Žalgiris		(Czechoslovakia) Inter Slovnaft	(Bulgaria) Akademik Varna	2nd of 6 teams	Bye	(Socialist Federal Republic of Yugoslavia) Cibona
1986–87	Žalgiris		(Romania) Steaua București	(Turkey) Galatasaray	5th of 6 teams		
1987–88
1988–89	CSKA Moscow			(Bulgaria) Balkan Botevgrad	7th of 8 teams		
1989–90	Stroitel		(Hungary) Csepel	(Poland) Lech Poznań			
1990–91	CSKA Moscow		(Romania) Steaua București	(England) Kingston Kings			
1991–92	Kalev		(Switzerland) Vevey	7th of 8 teams			

== FIBA European Cup Winners' Cup (2nd-tier) ==
=== Season to season ===
Year	Team	_______ Earlier stage _______	___________ Last 48 ___________	________ Last 24 to 32 ________	________ Last 12 to 16 ________	_________ Last 6 to 8 _________	_________ Semifinals _________	____________ Final ____________
1966–67
1967–68
1968–69	Dinamo Tbilisi					(Bulgaria) Levski-Spartak	(Greece) Panathinaikos	(Czechoslovakia) Slavia VŠ Praha
1969–70	Dinamo Tbilisi					(Poland) Polonia Warszawa	(Italy) Fides Napoli	
1970–71	Spartak Leningrad				(Romania) Steaua București	(Socialist Federal Republic of Yugoslavia) Zadar	(Spain) Juventud Nerva	(Italy) Simmenthal Milano
1971–72
1972–73	Spartak Leningrad				(Sweden) Solna IF	1st of 3 teams	(Spain) Juventud Schweppes	(Socialist Federal Republic of Yugoslavia) Jugoplastika
1973–74
1974–75	Spartak Leningrad					1st of 4 teams	(Bulgaria) CSKA Septemvriisko zname	(Socialist Federal Republic of Yugoslavia) Crvena zvezda
1975–76
1976–77	Spartak Leningrad					3rd of 4 teams		
1977–78
1978–79
1979–80
1980–81	Žalgiris				(Norway) Sandvika	4th of 4 teams		
1981–82	Stroitel				(Romania) Dinamo București	2nd of 4 teams	(Socialist Federal Republic of Yugoslavia) Cibona	
1982–83	Stroitel				(Hungary) Soproni MAFC			
1983–84
1984–85	Žalgiris				(Bulgaria) Spartak Pleven	1st of 4 teams	(France) ASVEL	(Spain) FC Barcelona
1985–86	CSKA Moscow					2nd of 4 teams	(Spain) FC Barcelona	
1986–87	CSKA Moscow				(Hungary) Bajai	1st of 4 teams	(Italy) Scavolini Pesaro	
1987–88
1988–89	Žalgiris				(Belgium) Maccabi Brussels	1st of 4 teams	(Italy) Snaidero Caserta	
1989–90	Žalgiris				(Luxembourg) T71 Dudelange	2nd of 4 teams	(Spain) Real Madrid	
1990–91	Dynamo Moscow				(Hungary) Körmendi Dózsa MTE	1st of 4 teams	(Greece) PAOK	
1991–92	Spartak Leningrad		(Portugal) Porto	(Belgium) Sunair Oostende				
1991–92	VEF Rīga	(Germany) Braunschweig	(Slovenia) Smelt Olimpija					

== FIBA Korać Cup (3rd-tier) ==
=== Season to season ===
Year	Team	_______ Earlier stage _______	________ Last 64 to 48 ________	________ Last 24 to 32 ________	________ Last 12 to 16 ________	_________ Last 6 to 8 _________	_________ Semifinals _________	____________ Final ____________
1972
1973
1973–74
1974–75	Stroitel				4th of 4 teams			
1974–75	Dynamo Moscow				3rd of 4 teams			
1975–76
1976–77	Dynamo Moscow				2nd of 3 teams			
1977–78
1978–79
1979–80
1980–81	Dynamo Moscow				1st of 4 teams	Not played	(Italy) Carrera Venezia	
1981–82	Spartak Leningrad				4th of 4 teams			
1982–83	Dynamo Moscow				1st of 4 teams	Not played	(France) Limoges CSP	
1983–84
1984–85	Stroitel			(Bulgaria) Akademik Varna	2nd of 4 teams			
1985–86
1986–87	Spartak Leningrad			(Finland) Uudenkaupungin Urheilijat	3rd of 4 teams			
1987–88
1988–89	Stroitel			(West Germany) Charlottenburg	2nd of 4 teams			
1988–89	Dinamo Tbilisi			(Greece) Olympiacos				
1989–90	CSKA Moscow			(West Germany) EnBW Ludwigsburg	1st of 4 teams	(Greece) Panionios	(Italy) Scavolini Pesaro	
1989–90	SKA Alma-Ata			(Czechoslovakia) Inter Slovnaft	3rd of 4 teams			
1990–91	Budivelnyk		(Finland) KTP	(Belgium) Trane Castors Braine				
1990–91	SKA Alma-Ata		(Bulgaria) Akademik Varna	(Socialist Federal Republic of Yugoslavia) Cibona				
1990–91	Kalev		(Czechoslovakia) Baník Cígeľ Prievidza	(Socialist Federal Republic of Yugoslavia) Zadar				
1990–91	VEF Rīga		(Romania) ICED București	(Greece) Iraklis Thessaloniki				
1991–92	Dynamo Moscow		(Israel) Hapoel Tel Aviv					

== See also ==
European basketball clubs in European and worldwide competitions from:

- Croatia
- Czechoslovakia
- France
- Greece
- Israel
- Italy
- Russia
- Spain
- Turkey
- Yugoslavia
