= Jānis Krūmiņš =

Soviet-Latvian basketball player

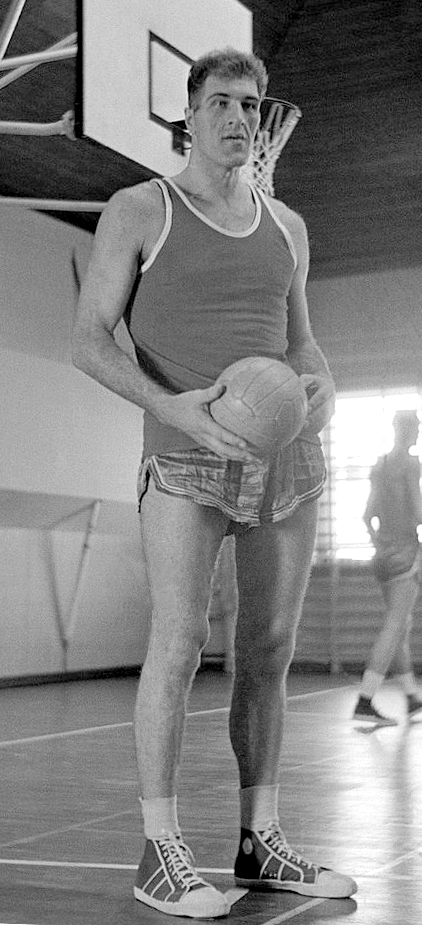
- Jānis Krūmiņš at the 1960 Summer Olympics.

Personal information
- Born: 30 January 1930 Raiskums Parish, Latvia
- Died: 20 November 1994 (aged 64) Riga, Latvia
- Listed height: 2.20 m (7 ft 2 1/2 in)
- Listed weight: 141 kg (311 lb)

Career information
- Playing career: 1954–1969
- Position: Center

Career history
- 1954–1964: Rīgas ASK
- 1964–1969: VEF Rīga

Career highlights
- 3× EuroLeague champion (1958–1960); 3× EuroLeague Finals Top Scorer (1958–1960); 4× USSR Premier League champion (1955–1958)
Medals
Representing the Soviet Union
Olympic Games
Silver medal – second place	1956 Melbourne
Silver medal – second place	1960 Rome
Silver medal – second place	1964 Tokyo
EuroBasket
Gold medal – first place	1959 Turkey
Gold medal – first place	1961 Yugoslavia
Gold medal – first place	1963 Poland

Jānis Krūmiņš (30 January 1930 – 20 November 1994) was a Soviet-Latvian professional basketball player. Helped by his height (about 220 cm, or 7'3"), he was the first giant center that dominated under European baskets, for years. As a player of the senior Soviet Union national basketball team, Krūmiņš won 3 gold medals at the 1959, 1961, and 1963 EuroBaskets, as well as 3 silver medals at the 1956, 1960, and 1964 Summer Olympic Games.

A Russian poll that was conducted in 2006, named Krūmiņš as the 3rd most popular Soviet men's basketball player of all time, after Arvydas Sabonis and Vladimir Tkachenko.

== Early life and career ==
Jānis Krūmiņš was born on 30 January 1930, in Raiskums Parish, Cēsis district, Latvia. His father was a big strong man, who died when Jānis was still a boy. At the age of 13, Krūmiņš had to start working, as a collector of tree resin. Very soon, he became an efficient worker, partly because his height (he was 2 meters (6 feet 7 inches) tall by the age 14) allowed him to reach where others failed. He liked his work, and later was hesitant to turn into a professional basketball player, saying that he could always get injured and lose his job as a basketball player, but not as a resin collector. As a well-built giant, Krūmiņš attracted the attention of many sports coaches, who tried to get him into wrestling, boxing, and athletics. Famous Soviet athletics coach Viktor Alexeyev even brought him in for a month to an athletics training camp. All of those attempts failed, because of a lack of interest from Krūmiņš.

In 1953, Krūmiņš was discovered by head basketball coach Alexander Gomelsky, and he was brought to the basketball club Rīgas ASK. Gomelsky was struggling to make ASK the top Latvian basketball club of the time, and he needed a strong player at the center position. Although Krūmiņš had never played basketball before, Gomelsky intuitively believed in his potential, and spent up to 2 hours personally training Krūmiņš before each of the team's training sessions. Gomelsky considered Krūmiņš to be his only apprentice in his whole basketball career — all the other players that he coached were well-established before he had coached them. Physically, Krūmiņš had good coordination and extraordinary strength, but he was slow. His height was exceptional for that time, and was variably reported between 2.18 and 2.23 m (7 ft 2 in and 7 ft 4 in). The variation was mostly due to his body's natural contraction during the day, and over the length of his playing career. With a weight of 141 kg (312 pounds), he was described as, "well built and dry". He was not a talented pupil, but he was exceptionally persistent, and performed all the drills that were set by his coach. His strongest point, according to Gomelsky, was his mental balance and reliability. On the other hand, he was too shy for a team leader. Seeing a 2.20 m (7 ft 3 in) giant, most defenders did not hesitate to step on his toes, or to push or punch him. Krūmiņš patiently took all abuses, and when once asked why he didn't fight back, replied that he was afraid he might accidentally kill someone. Later, when Krūmiņš became a star, his modesty brought another problem — he was instantly recognized by people on the streets, and cheered and touched by the crowds, which made him feel uncomfortable. As a result of that, he stopped using public transportation, and drove a car instead.

Another mundane daily problem was his height, which hindered his ability to find clothes and shoes that fit properly. Luckily, Krūmiņš was spotted by Soviet Marshal Hovhannes Bagramyan. Bagramyan, who was a big man himself, was favorable to tall sportsmen, and after meeting Krūmiņš, he ordered a 3-meter-long (9'10") bed to be custom built for Krūmiņš, as well as for custom shoes and clothes to be made for him.

== Club career ==
After the training efforts of Krūmiņš and Gomelsky, Krūmiņš quickly developed into a smart center and a team leader of Rīgas ASK. He won the USSR Premier League championship in 1955, 1956 (with the Latvian SSR Team), 1957, and 1958.

In 1958, Rīgas ASK entered the inaugural EuroLeague season as the USSR Premier League champions. Led by Krūmiņš who averaged 17.2 points per game, ASK advanced to the finals. There the Soviet team played against the Bulgarian champions Academic Sofia. Krūmiņš was excellent, averaging 22.5 points and leading his team to the title, and being the EuroLeague Finals Top Scorer.

In the following two seasons, ASK led by Krūmiņš, repeated their success, winning the EuroLeague in 1959 and 1960 seasons, completing a three-peat. The Latvian center was the Finals Top Scorer in both instances, averaging 28.0 points per game in 1959 and 21.5 points per game in 1960.

ASK reached the EuroLeague Finals for the fourth consecutive time in 1961. This time, it was a duel of two Soviet teams. ASK could not defend their title, losing to CSKA Moscow. Krūmiņš averaged 10.0 points per game in the finals and 14.7 points per game throughout the season. It was his last appearance in the EuroLeague and after first four seasons, Krūmiņš was the all-time leading scorer of this competition with 440 points.

In 1964, Krūmiņš was asked to join the recently-founded VEF Rīga team. Being in the twilight of his career, Krūmiņš still remained valuable player and in he helped VEF to win the bronze medals of the Soviet League in 1966. Krūmiņš played for the factory team till 1969 and finished his club career with VEF at the age of 39.

Krūmiņš remained a laid back player over all of those years, as he continued to spare smaller and weaker opponents from his best. However, he was quite emotional and active in the key games that his teams played, and he played with full effort against players that were similar to him in size. Krūmiņš had a rare free throw shooting style — as he shot free throws underhanded, rather than the usual overhanded free throw technique. However, he was still able to make 90% of his free throw attempts on average.

== National team career ==
Krūmiņš was included into the senior USSR national basketball team in 1955. He was a dominant center for the Soviet Union at the 1956 Summer Olympics, and he helped the Soviet national team to reach the tournament's finals, and earn a silver medal. He played with the senior Soviet national team for about 10 years, and with them he won EuroBasket gold medals in 1959, 1961, and 1963; and Summer Olympic Games silver medals in 1956, 1960, and 1964. He also played at the 1959 FIBA World Championship.

== Personal life ==
Krūmiņš was shy around people, including women. He met his wife, Inessa, by chance. In 1960, while she was working as a sculptor, she was ordered to make a bust of Krūmiņš, on the occasion of the 20th anniversary of the Latvian Soviet Socialist Republic. The couple had two sons, and a daughter. After retiring from playing basketball, Krūmiņš worked within his family business, and became a renowned metalworker, molding metal art from sketches done by his wife. Krūmiņš died on 20 November 1994, at the age of 64.

== Awards and honors ==
EuroLeague

- 3× EuroLeague champion (1958, 1959, 1960)
- 3× EuroLeague Finals Top Scorer (1958, 1959, 1960)
- 3× Top 10 in EuroLeague scoring - 4th (1959), 2nd (1960), 8th (1961)
- Only player in EuroLeague history to win three consecutive EuroLeague titles and Finals MVP awards combined
- EuroLeague all-time best scorer after 1961 season (440 points)
