= Alexander Gomelsky =

Russian basketball player and coach

Personal information
- Born: 18 January 1928 Kronstadt, Leningrad Oblast, Russian SFSR, Soviet Union
- Died: 16 August 2005 (aged 77) Moscow, Russia

Career information
- Playing career: 1945–1953
- Position: Point guard / shooting guard
- Coaching career: 1949–1991

Career history

Playing
- 1945–1948: SKIF Leningrad
- 1949–1953: SKA Leningrad

Coaching
- 1949–1952: Spartak Leningrad (women)
- 1953–1965: Rīgas ASK
- 1970–1979, 1985–1986: CSKA Moscow
- 1988–1989: Tenerife AB
- 1990–1991: CSP Limoges

Career highlights
- As a head coach: 4× EuroLeague champion (1958–1960, 1971); FIBA EuroStar (1999); Honored Coach of the USSR (1956); Master of Sports of the USSR International Class (1965); 12× Soviet League champion (1955–1958, 1971–1974, 1976–1979); 2× Soviet Cup winner (1972, 1973); 4× Soviet Union Men's Basketball Coach of the Year (1967, 1977, 1982, 1988); Honored Coach of the Lithuanian SSR (1982); Olympic Order (1998); Contributor to Russian Basketball (2004); 50 Greatest EuroLeague Contributors (2008)
- Basketball Hall of Fame
- FIBA Hall of Fame
Medals
Men's basketball
Head coach for Soviet Union
FIBA EuroBasket
Gold medal – first place	1963 Poland
Gold medal – first place	1965 Soviet Union
Gold medal – first place	1967 Finland
Gold medal – first place	1969 Italy
Gold medal – first place	1979 Italy
Gold medal – first place	1981 Czechoslovakia
Silver medal – second place	1977 Belgium
Silver medal – second place	1987 Greece
Bronze medal – third place	1983 France
FIBA World Cup
Gold medal – first place	1967 Montevideo
Gold medal – first place	1982 Colombia
Silver medal – second place	1978 Philippines
Bronze medal – third place	1963 Rio de Janeiro
Bronze medal – third place	1970 Yugoslavia
Olympic Games
Gold medal – first place	1988 Seoul
Silver medal – second place	1964 Tokyo
Bronze medal – third place	1968 Mexico City
Bronze medal – third place	1980 Moscow

Alexander Yakovlevich Gomelsky (Russian: Александр Яковлевич Гомельский; 18 January 1928 – 16 August 2005) was a Russian professional basketball player and coach. The Father of Soviet and Russian basketball, he was inducted into the Naismith Memorial Basketball Hall of Fame in 1995 and the FIBA Hall of Fame in 2007.

Alexander Gomelsky was awarded the Olympic Order by the International Olympic Committee in 1998. In 2008, he was named one of the 50 Greatest EuroLeague Contributors.

== Playing career ==
Gomelsky played club basketball in the Soviet Union. He played with SKIF Leningrad, from 1945 to 1948. He finished his playing career with SKA, where he played from 1949 to 1953.

== Club coaching career ==
Gomelsky began his coaching career in 1949, in Leningrad, with the women's team of LGS Spartak. In 1953, he became the coach of Rīgas ASK, leading the team to three Soviet Union League titles (1955, 1957, 1958), and three consecutive European Champions Cups (EuroLeague), from 1958 to 1960.

In 1970, he was appointed the head coach of CSKA Moscow, leading the club to 8 Soviet Union national league championships (1971–1974, 1976–1979), 2 Soviet Union Cups (1972, 1973), and one European Champions Cup (EuroLeague) title in 1971. He also led the club to two more European Champions Cup (EuroLeague) finals, in 1970, and 1973.

He also coached in Spain and France shortly before the dissolution of the USSR.

== National team coaching career ==
Gomelsky was the long-time head coach of the senior Soviet Union national team, leading them to 6 EuroBasket titles (1963, 1965, 1967, 1969, 1979, and 1981), 2 FIBA World Cup titles (1967, and 1982), and the Summer Olympic Games gold medal in 1988.

He was originally the Soviet national team head coach in 1972, and was expected to coach the team at the 1972 Summer Olympic games, but the KGB confiscated his passport, fearing that, since Gomelsky was Jewish, he would defect to Israel. The Soviet team, with Vladimir Kondrashin as their coach, won their first Olympic gold medal that year, after a controversial game against the United States.

== Individual awards ==
For merits in the development of sports and basketball was awarded:

- Honored Coach of the USSR: 1956
- Master of Sports of the USSR International Class: 1965
- 4× Soviet Union Coach of the Year: 1967, 1977, 1982, 1988
- Honored Coach of the Lithuanian SSR: 1982
- Order of the Red Banner of Labour: 1982
- Order of the Red Star
- Order of Friendship of Peoples
- 2 Orders of the Badge of Honour
- Honored Worker of Physical Culture of Russia: 1993
- Silver Olympic Order: 1998
- FIBA EuroStar: 1998
- Order of Merit (Ukraine): 2003

== Career achievements ==
=== Club competitions ===
- EuroLeague: 4 (Rīgas ASK: 1958, 1959, 1960 & CSKA Moscow: 1971)
- Soviet League: 12 (Rīgas ASK: 1955, 1957, 1958, Latvian SSR Team 1956 & CSKA Moscow: 1971–1974, 1976–1979)
- Soviet Cup: 2 (CSKA Moscow: 1972, 1973)

=== National team competitions ===
- 1963 FIBA World Championship: Bronze
- EuroBasket 1963: Gold
- 1964 Summer Olympics: Silver
- EuroBasket 1965: Gold
- 1967 FIBA World Championship: Gold
- EuroBasket 1967: Gold
- 1968 Summer Olympics: Bronze
- EuroBasket 1969: Gold
- 1970 FIBA World Championship: Bronze
- EuroBasket 1977: Silver
- 1978 FIBA World Championship: Silver
- EuroBasket 1979: Gold
- 1980 Summer Olympics: Bronze
- EuroBasket 1981: Gold
- 1982 FIBA World Championship: Gold
- EuroBasket 1983: Bronze
- EuroBasket 1987: Silver
- 1988 Summer Olympics: Gold

== Post coaching career ==
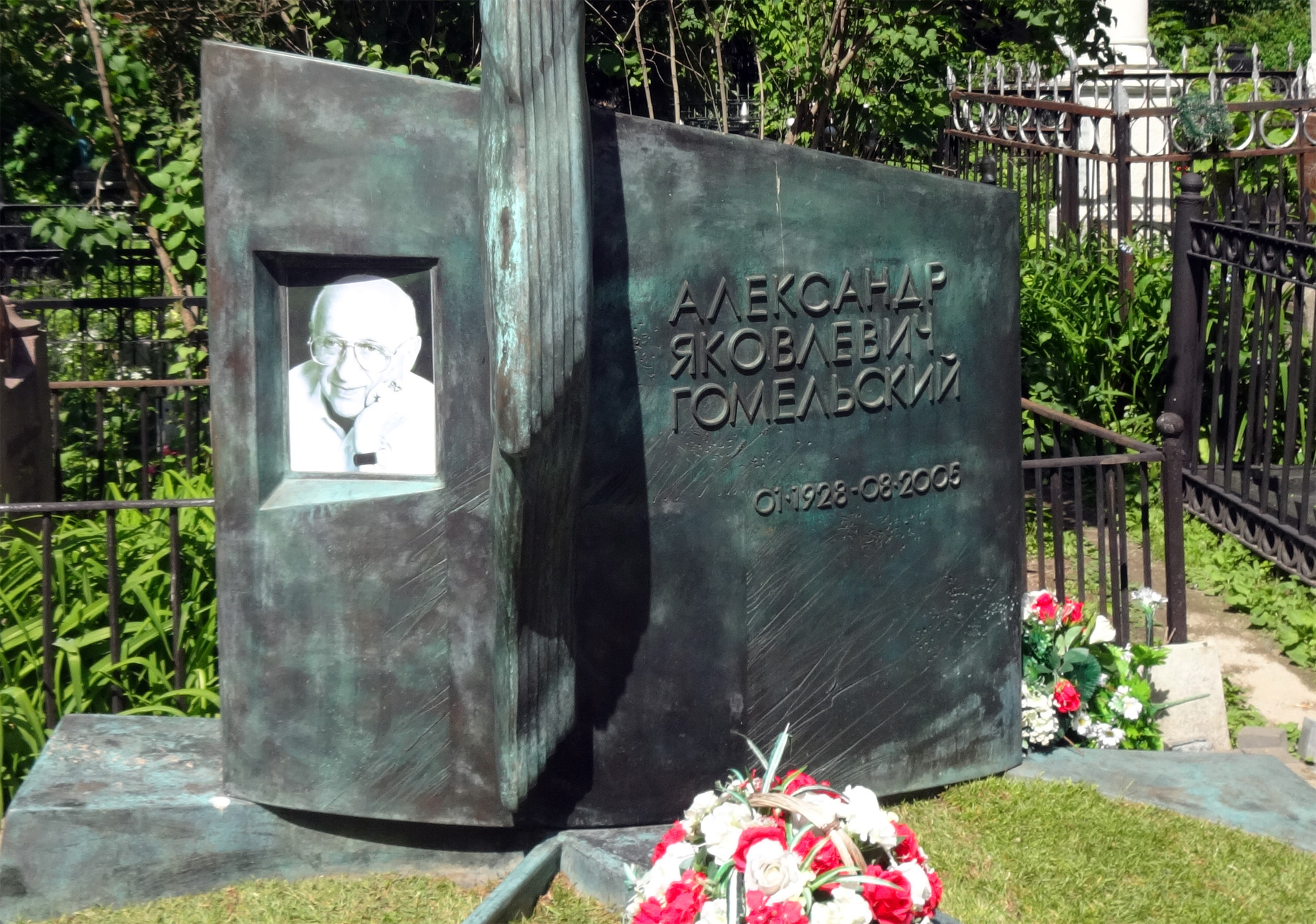
Grave of Gomelsky at the Vagankovo Cemetery in Moscow

In his later years, Gomelsky was the president of the Russian Basketball Federation from 1991 to 1992. In December 1997, he became president of the CSKA Moscow. In 1995, he was inducted into the Naismith Memorial Basketball Hall of Fame. In 2007, he was enshrined into the FIBA Hall of Fame. In 2008, he was named one of the 50 Greatest EuroLeague Contributors.

The EuroLeague's annual Alexander Gomelsky EuroLeague Coach of the Year award is named after him, and so is Alexander Gomelsky Universal Sports Hall CSKA.

Every year the Gomelsky Cup is organized by CSKA in honor of its legendary coach.

== Personal life ==
The Gomelsky family has been a driving force behind development of the Soviet/Russian basketball. Gomelsky's younger brother, Evgeny, is also a well-known basketball coach, and his son, Vladimir, also worked as a basketball player and coach. His son Gomelsky [Alexandre] ran a sports association school in his father name, leading to several female Olympic basketball players. He was survived by his four sons and four grandchildren. His wife Tatiana, also a basketball player and coach, died from cancer. Is Jewish.

He died on the 78th year of his life on 16 August 2005 from leukaemia. Buried at the Vagankovo Cemetery.

== See also ==
- FIBA Basketball World Cup winning head coaches
- List of select Jewish coaches
- List of FIBA EuroBasket winning coaches
- List of EuroLeague-winning head coaches

== Bibliography ==
- A. Ya. Gomelsky (1985). Team Management in Basketball (in Russian). Moscow: Fizkultura i sport. Archived from the original on 24 February 2007.
