= Vladimir Andreev (basketball) =

Russian basketball player (born 1945)

Personal information
- Born: June 14, 1945 (age 81) Moscow, Soviet Union
- Listed height: 7 ft 0.75 in (2.15 m)
- Listed weight: 215 lb (98 kg)

Career information
- Playing career: 1963–1975
- Position: Center

Career history
- 1963–1966: Lokomotiv (Alma-Ata)
- 1966–1974: CSKA Moscow
- 1974–1975: Rīgas ASK

Career highlights
- 2× EuroLeague champion (1969, 1971); 6× USSR Premier League champion (1969–1974); 2× USSR Cup winner (1972, 1973)
Medals
Men's basketball
Representing Soviet Union
Olympic Games
Bronze medal – third place	1968 Mexico City
FIBA World Cup
Gold medal – first place	1967 Montevideo
FIBA EuroBasket
Gold medal – first place	1967 Finland
Gold medal – first place	1969 Italy
Gold medal – first place	1971 West Germany

Vladimir Georgiyevich Andreev (Russian: Владимир Георгиевич Андреев; born 14 June 1945) is a Russian former basketball player. At 2.15 m (7'0 3/4") tall, he played at the center position. He was among the 105 player nominees for the 50 Greatest EuroLeague Contributors list.

== Professional career ==
As a member of the Soviet team CSKA Moscow, Andreev won six USSR Premier League championships (1969–1974), and two USSR Cup titles (1972, 1973). In 1969, while playing with CSKA, Andreev won the FIBA European Champions' Cup (EuroLeague) championship, against the Spanish club Real Madrid. He was the top scorer of the EuroLeague Final, with a total of 37 points scored. He also won the EuroLeague championship with CSKA in 1971.

== National team career ==
Andreev was a member of the senior men's Soviet national team, from 1967 to 1971. With the USSR, he won three FIBA EuroBasket titles. He won the gold medal at the 1967 FIBA EuroBasket, the 1969 FIBA EuroBasket, and the 1971 FIBA EuroBasket. He also won the gold medal at the 1967 FIBA World Cup, and the bronze medal at the 1968 Mexico City Summer Olympic Games.
