= EuroLeague Championship Game Top Scorer =

Basketball individual award in Europe

The EuroLeague Finals Top Scorer is the individual award for the player that gained the highest points in the EuroLeague Championship Games, the championship finals of the European-wide top-tier level professional club basketball competition, the EuroLeague.

== EuroLeague Finals Top Scorers ==
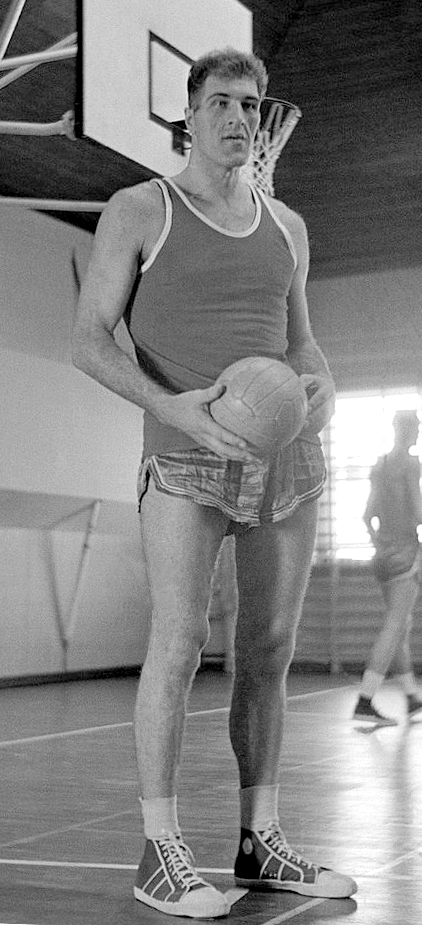
Jānis Krūmiņš was the FIBA European Champions Cup Finals' Top Scorer 3 times (1958, 1959, 1960).

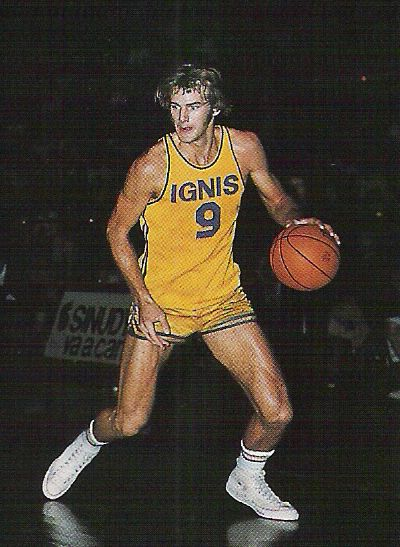
Bob Morse was the FIBA European Champions Cup Finals' Top Scorer 2 times (1975, 1976).

Arvydas Sabonis was the EuroLeague Finals' Top Scorer 2 times (1986, 1995).

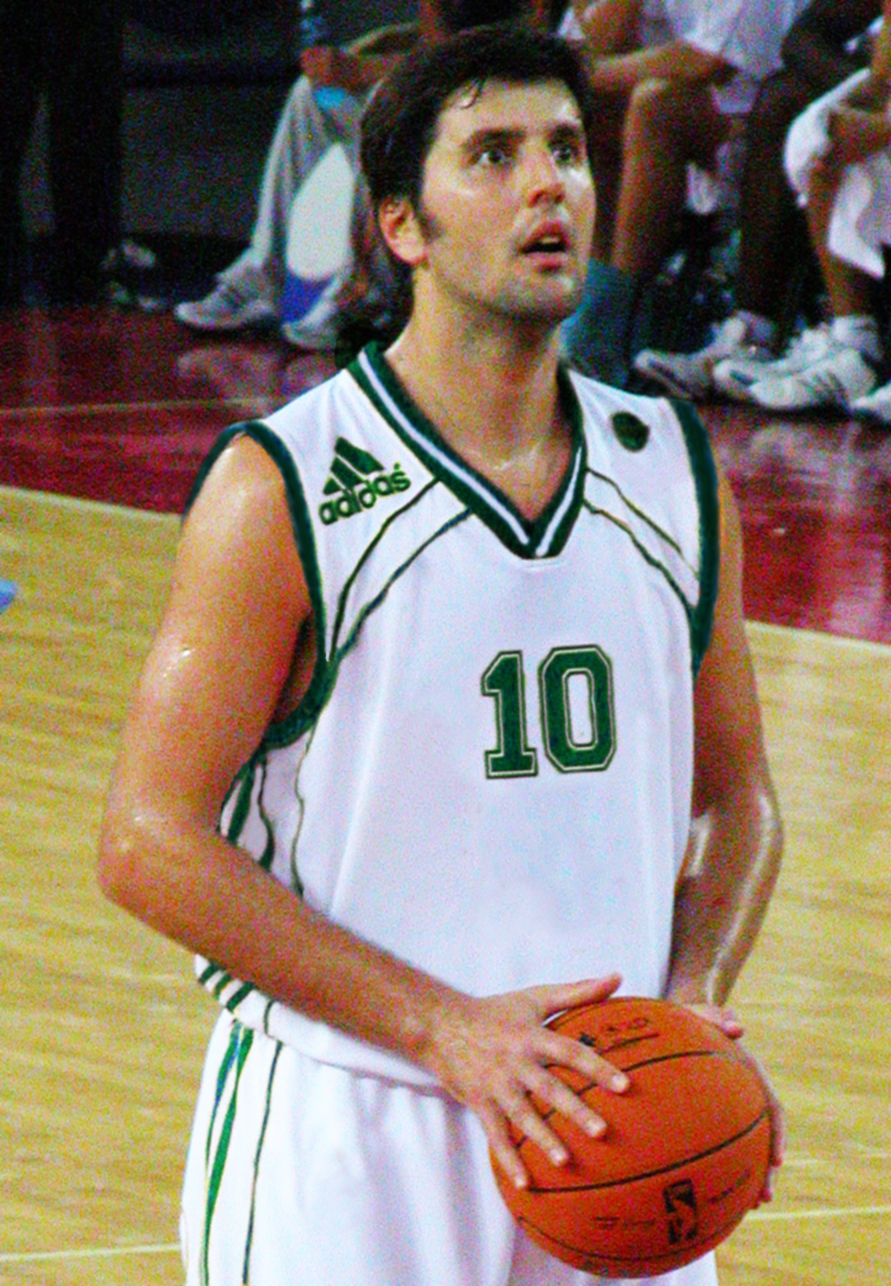
Dejan Bodiroga was the FIBA SuproLeague Finals' Top Scorer (2001), and the EuroLeague Finals' Top Scorer (2003).

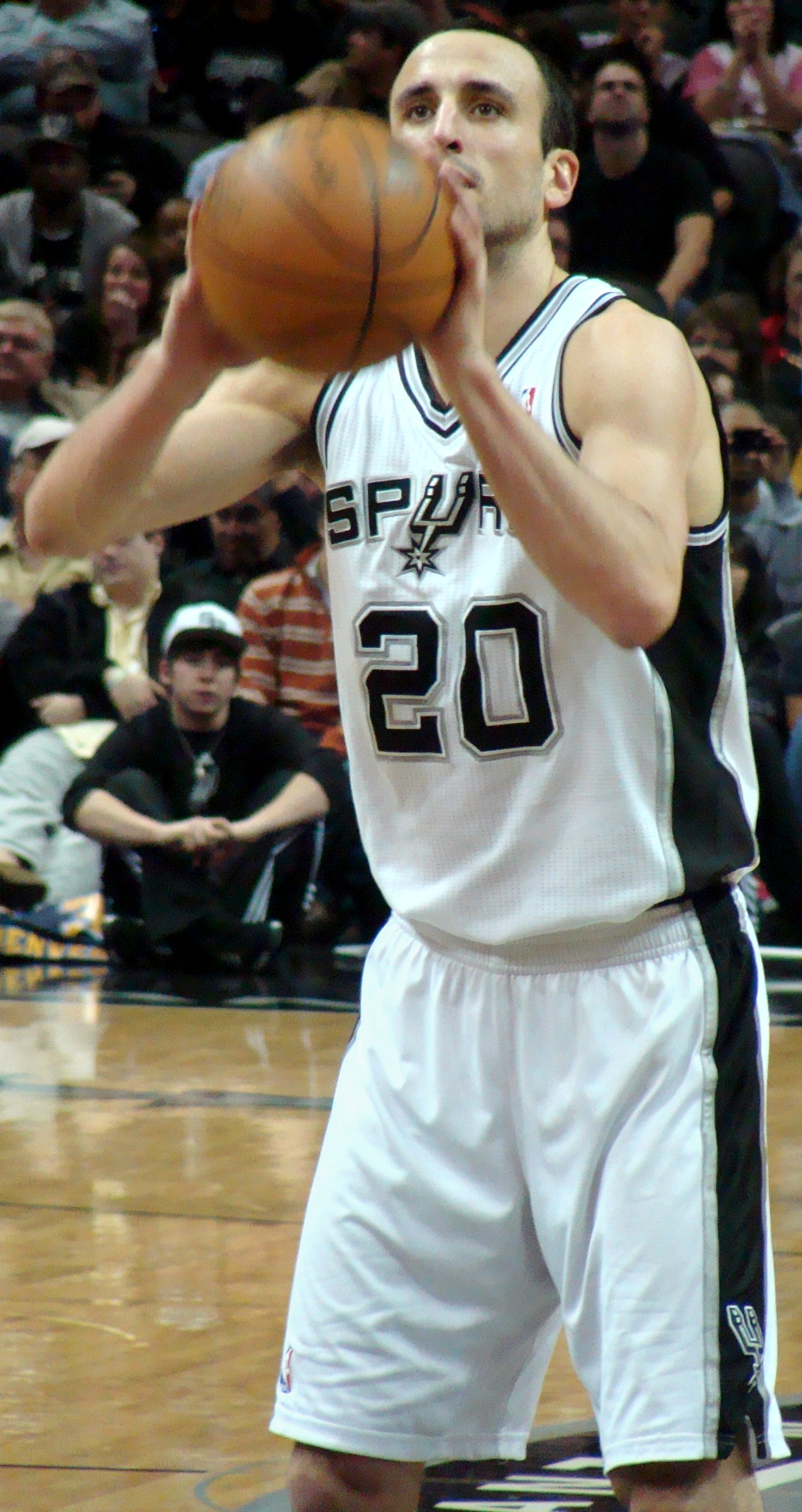
Manu Ginóbili was the EuroLeague Finals' Top Scorer 2 times (2001, 2002).

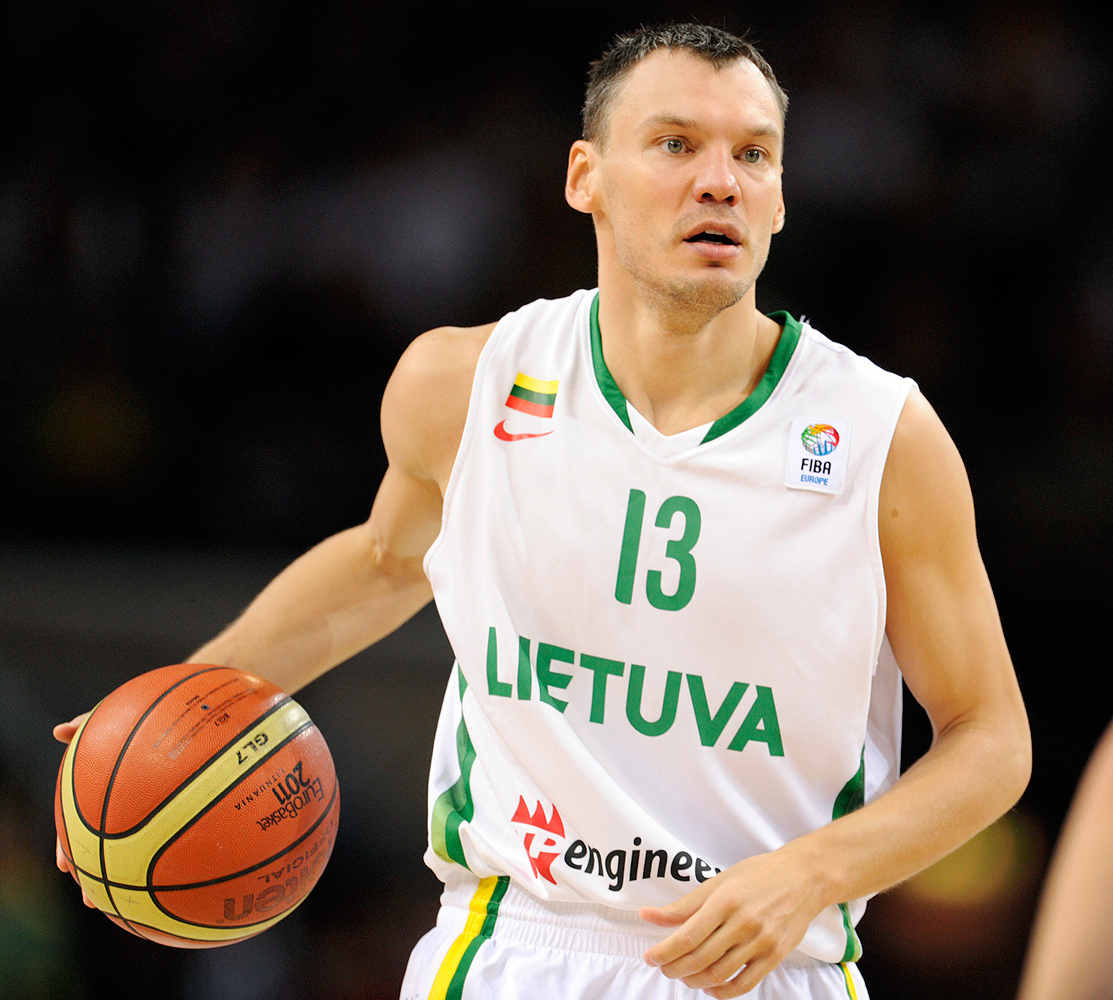
Šarūnas Jasikevičius was the EuroLeague Finals' Top Scorer (2005).

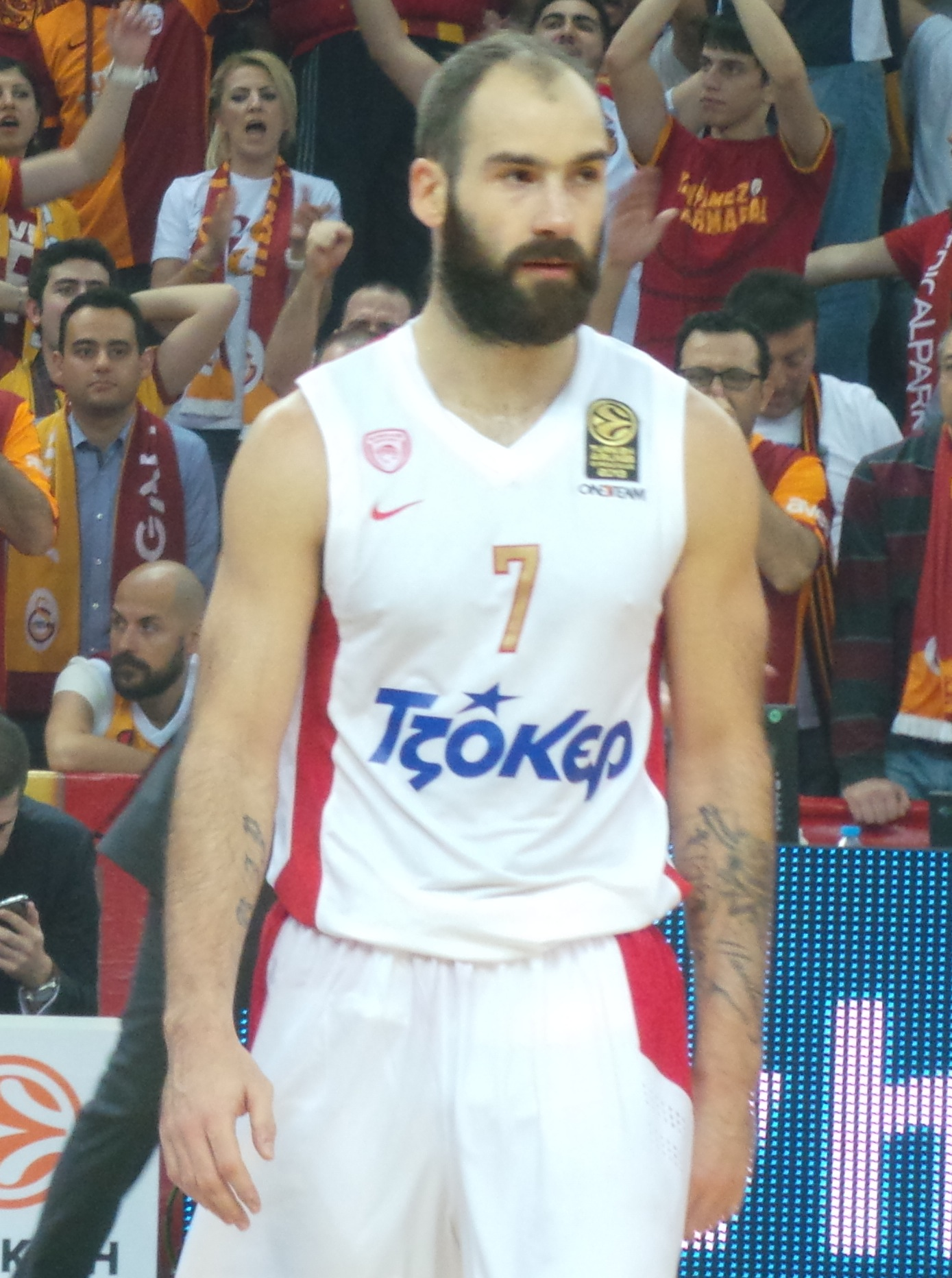
Vassilis Spanoulis was the EuroLeague Finals' Top Scorer (2013).

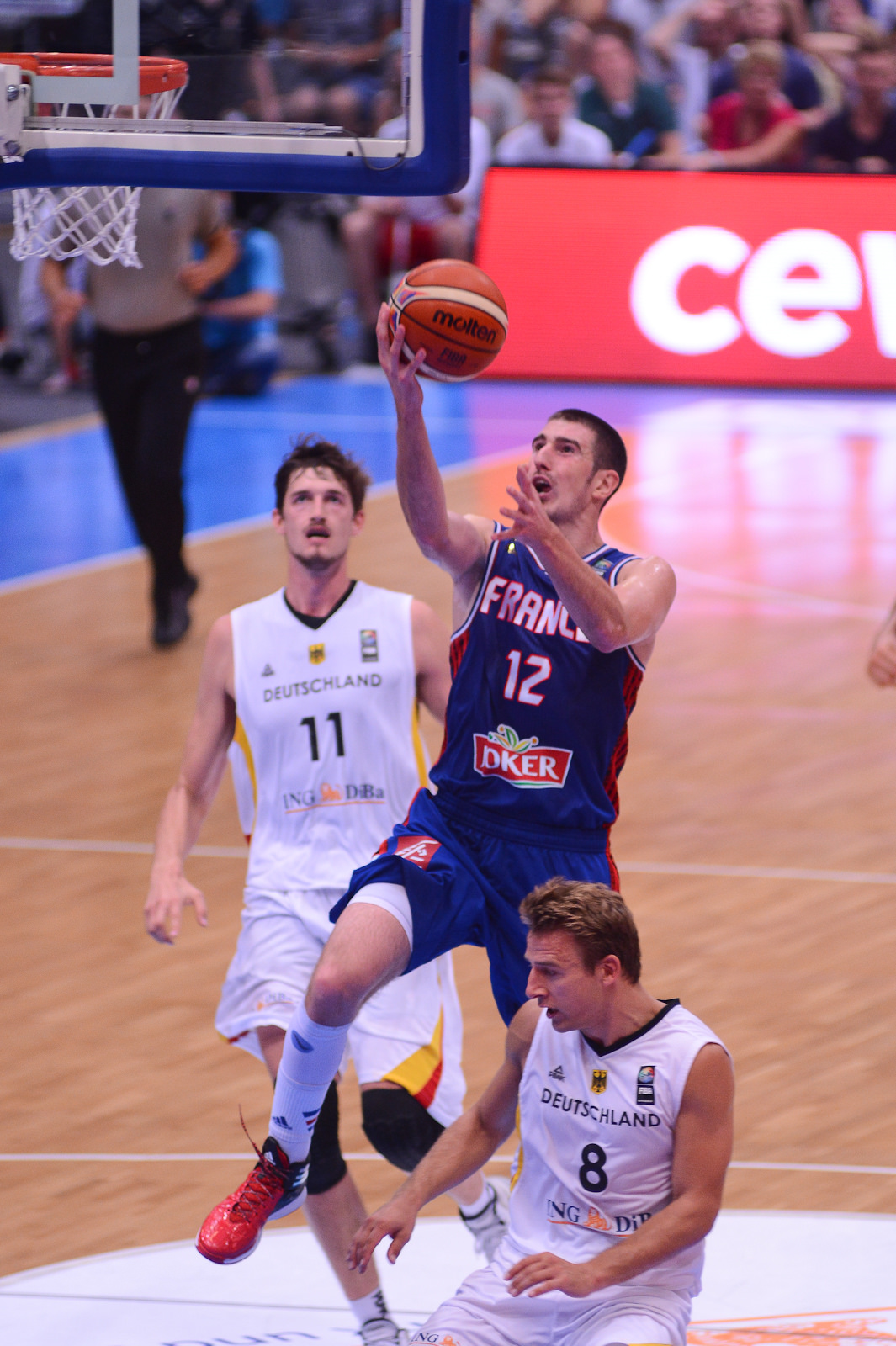
Nando de Colo (#12 in blue), was the EuroLeague Finals' Top Scorer (2016).

From the 1958 season, to the present, the Top Scorer of the EuroLeague Finals is noted, regardless of whether he played on the winning or losing team.

Bronze	Member of the FIBA Hall of Fame.
Silver	Member of the Naismith Memorial Basketball Hall of Fame.
Gold	Member of both the FIBA Hall of Fame and the Naismith Memorial Basketball Hall of Fame.
(X)	Denotes the number of times the player has been the Top Scorer.

- Player nationality by national team:

Season	Top Scorer	Team	Points Scored
Prior to EuroLeague Final Four Era (1958 to 1986–87)
1958	(Soviet Union) Jānis Krūmiņš	(Soviet Union) Rīgas ASK	22.5 average (2 games)
1958–59	(Soviet Union) Jānis Krūmiņš (2×)	(Soviet Union) Rīgas ASK	28.0 average (2 games)
1959–60	(Soviet Union) Jānis Krūmiņš (3×)	(Soviet Union) Rīgas ASK	21.5 average (2 games)
1960–61	(Soviet Union) Viktor Zubkov	(Soviet Union) CSKA Moscow	21.5 average (2 games)
1961–62	(United States) Wayne Hightower	(Spain) Real Madrid	30
1962–63	(Spain) Emiliano Rodríguez	(Spain) Real Madrid	21.0 average (3 games)
1963–64	(Spain) Emiliano Rodríguez (2×)	(Spain) Real Madrid	29.5 average (2 games)
1964–65	(Spain) Clifford Luyk	(Spain) Real Madrid	24.0 average (2 games)
1965–66	(Czechoslovakia) Jiří Zídek Sr.	(Czechoslovakia) Slavia VŠ Praha	22
1966–67	(United States) Steve Chubin	(Italy) Simmenthal Milano	34
1967–68	(United States) Miles Aiken	(Spain) Real Madrid	26
1968–69	(Soviet Union) Vladimir Andreev	(Soviet Union) CSKA Moscow	37
1969–70	(Soviet Union) Sergei Belov	(Soviet Union) CSKA Moscow	21
1970–71	(Soviet Union) Sergei Belov (2×)	(Soviet Union) CSKA Moscow	24
1971–72	(Socialist Federal Republic of Yugoslavia) Petar Skansi	(Socialist Federal Republic of Yugoslavia) Jugoplastika	26
1972–73	(Soviet Union) Sergei Belov (3×)	(Soviet Union) CSKA Moscow	36
1973–74	(Italy) Dino Meneghin	(Italy) Ignis Varese	25
1974–75	(United States) Bob Morse	(Italy) Ignis Varese	30
1975–76	(United States) Bob Morse (2×)	(Italy) Mobilgirgi Varese	28
1976–77	(Israel) Jim Boatwright	(Israel) Maccabi Elite Tel Aviv	26
1977–78	(United States) Walter Szczerbiak Sr.	(Spain) Real Madrid	25
1978–79	(Socialist Federal Republic of Yugoslavia) Žarko Varajić	(Socialist Federal Republic of Yugoslavia) Bosna	45
1979–80	(Israel) Earl Williams	(Israel) Maccabi Elite Tel Aviv	31
1980–81	(Italy) Marco Bonamico	(Italy) Sinudyne Bologna	26
1981–82	(United States) Bruce Flowers	(Italy) Squibb Cantù	23
1982–83	(Italy) Antonello Riva	(Italy) Ford Cantù	20
1983–84	(Spain) J.A. San Epifanio "Epi"	(Spain) FC Barcelona	31
1984–85	(Socialist Federal Republic of Yugoslavia) Dražen Petrović	(Socialist Federal Republic of Yugoslavia) Cibona	36
1985–86	(Soviet Union) Arvydas Sabonis	(Soviet Union) Žalgiris	27
1986–87	(United States) Lee Johnson	(Israel) Maccabi Elite Tel Aviv	24
EuroLeague Final Four Era (1987–88 to present)
1987–88	(United States) Bob McAdoo	(Italy) Tracer Milano	25
1988–89	(Israel) Doron Jamchi	(Israel) Maccabi Elite Tel Aviv	25
1989–90	(Socialist Federal Republic of Yugoslavia) Toni Kukoč	(Socialist Federal Republic of Yugoslavia) Jugoplastika	20
1990–91	(Socialist Federal Republic of Yugoslavia) Zoran Savić	(Socialist Federal Republic of Yugoslavia) POP 84	27
1991–92	(Socialist Federal Republic of Yugoslavia) Sasha Danilović	(Socialist Federal Republic of Yugoslavia) Partizan	25
1992–93	(United States) Terry Teagle	(Italy) Benetton Treviso	19
1993–94	(Spain) Ferran Martínez	(Spain) 7up Joventut	17
1994–95	(Lithuania) Arvydas Sabonis (2×)	(Spain) Real Madrid Teka	23
1995–96	(Lithuania) Artūras Karnišovas	(Spain) FC Barcelona Banca Catalana	23
1996–97	(United States) David Rivers	(Greece) Olympiacos	26
1997–98	(France) Antoine Rigaudeau	(Italy) Kinder Bologna	14
1998–99	(France) Antoine Rigaudeau (2×)	(Italy) Kinder Bologna	27
1999–00	(United States) Nate Huffman	(Israel) Maccabi Elite Tel Aviv	26
2000–01 (SuproLeague)*	(Federal Republic of Yugoslavia) Dejan Bodiroga	(Greece) Panathinaikos	27
2000–01 (EuroLeague)†*	(Argentina) Manu Ginóbili	(Italy) Kinder Bologna	15.4 average (5 games)
2000–01 (EuroLeague)†*	(United States) Elmer Bennett	(Spain) Tau Cerámica	15.4 average (5 games)
2000–01 (EuroLeague)†*	(United States) Victor Alexander	(Spain) Tau Cerámica	15.4 average (5 games)
2001–02	(Argentina) Manu Ginóbili (2×)	(Italy) Kinder Bologna	27
2002–03	(Serbia and Montenegro) Dejan Bodiroga (2×)	(Spain) FC Barcelona	20
2003–04	(United States) Anthony Parker	(Israel) Maccabi Elite Tel Aviv	21
2003–04	(Serbia and Montenegro) Miloš Vujanić	(Italy) Skipper Bologna	21
2004–05	(Lithuania) Šarūnas Jasikevičius	(Israel) Maccabi Elite Tel Aviv	22
2005–06	(United States) Will Solomon	(Israel) Maccabi Elite Tel Aviv	20
2006–07	(Greece) Theo Papaloukas	(Russia) CSKA Moscow	23
2007–08	(United States) Will Bynum	(Israel) Maccabi Elite Tel Aviv	23
2008–09	(United States) (Russia) J.R. Holden	(Russia) CSKA Moscow	14
2009–10	(Spain) Juan Carlos Navarro	(Spain) Regal FC Barcelona	21
2010–11	(United States) Mike Batiste	(Greece) Panathinaikos	18
2011–12	(Greece) Kostas Papanikolaou	(Greece) Olympiacos	18
2012–13	(Greece) Vassilis Spanoulis	(Greece) Olympiacos	22
2013–14	(United States) (Montenegro) Tyrese Rice	(Israel) Maccabi Electra Tel Aviv	26
2014–15	(United States) (Belgium) Matt Lojeski	(Greece) Olympiacos	17
2015–16	(France) Nando de Colo	(Russia) CSKA Moscow	22
2016–17	(Serbia) Bogdan Bogdanović	(Turkey) Fenerbahçe	17
2016–17	(Serbia) Nikola Kalinić	(Turkey) Fenerbahçe	17
2017–18	(Italy) Nicolò Melli	(Turkey) Fenerbahçe	28
2018–19	(United States) (Turkey) Shane Larkin	(Turkey) Anadolu Efes	29
2019–20	Cancelled due to COVID-19 pandemic		
2020–21	(Serbia) Vasilije Micić	(Turkey) Anadolu Efes	25
2021–22	(Serbia) Vasilije Micić (2×)	(Turkey) Anadolu Efes	23
2022–23	(Bulgaria) (Greece) Sasha Vezenkov	(Greece) Olympiacos	29
2023–24	(Greece) Kostas Sloukas	(Greece) Panathinaikos	24
2024–25	(United States) Nigel Hayes-Davis	(Turkey) Fenerbahçe	23
2025–26	(Canada) (United States) Trey Lyles	(Spain) Real Madrid	24

* The 2000–01 season was a transition year, with the best European teams splitting into two different major leagues: The SuproLeague, held by FIBA Europe, and the EuroLeague, held by Euroleague Basketball.

=== Multiple EuroLeague Finals Top Scorers ===
Number	Player	Years
3×	(Soviet Union) Jānis Krūmiņš	1958, 1959, 1960
3×	(Soviet Union) Sergei Belov	1970, 1971, 1973
2×	(Spain) Emiliano Rodríguez	1963, 1964
2×	(United States) Bob Morse	1975, 1976
2×	(Lithuania) Arvydas Sabonis	1986, 1995
2×	(France) Antoine Rigaudeau	1998, 1999
2×	(Federal Republic of Yugoslavia) Dejan Bodiroga	2001 SuproLeague*, 2003
2×	(Argentina) Manu Ginóbili	2001 EuroLeague*, 2002
2×	(Serbia) Vasilije Micić	2021, 2022

== Top scoring performances in EuroLeague Finals games ==
- The top scoring performances in EuroLeague Finals games:

Points Scored	Player	Club	Year	Opponent Club
45	(Socialist Federal Republic of Yugoslavia) Žarko Varajić	(Socialist Federal Republic of Yugoslavia) Bosna	1979	(Italy) Emerson Varese
37	(Soviet Union) Vladimir Andreev	(Soviet Union) CSKA Moscow	1969	(Spain) Real Madrid
36	(Soviet Union) Sergei Belov	(Soviet Union) CSKA Moscow	1973	(Italy) Ignis Varese
36	(Socialist Federal Republic of Yugoslavia) Dražen Petrović	(Socialist Federal Republic of Yugoslavia) Cibona	1985	(Spain) Real Madrid
34	(United States) Steve Chubin	(Italy) Simmenthal Milano	1967	(Spain) Real Madrid
31	(Spain) Emiliano Rodríguez	(Spain) Real Madrid	1964 (game 1)	(Czechoslovakia) Spartak ZJŠ Brno
31	(Israel) Earl Williams	(Israel) Maccabi Elite Tel Aviv	1980	(Spain) Real Madrid
31	(Spain) J.A. San Epifanio "Epi"	(Spain) FC Barcelona	1984	(Italy) Banco di Roma Virtus
30	(United States) Wayne Hightower	(Spain) Real Madrid	1962	(Soviet Union) Dinamo Tbilisi
30	(Czechoslovakia) František Konvička	(Czechoslovakia) Spartak ZJŠ Brno	1964 (game 1)	(Spain) Real Madrid
30	(Spain) Clifford Luyk	(Spain) Real Madrid	1965 (game 1)	(Soviet Union) CSKA Moscow
30	(Socialist Federal Republic of Yugoslavia) Mirza Delibašić	(Socialist Federal Republic of Yugoslavia) Bosna	1979	(Italy) Emerson Varese

== See also ==
- FIBA Saporta Cup Finals Top Scorer (2nd tier level)
- FIBA Korać Cup Finals Top Scorer (3rd tier level)
