= Jónatan James Bow =

American-Icelandic basketball player

Personal information
- Born: February 16, 1966 (age 60)
- Listed height: 198 cm (6 ft 6 in)

Career information
- High school: Freeland
- College: IUPUI
- Playing career: 1989–2001
- Position: Forward

Career history

Playing
- 1989–1990: Haukar
- 1989: → KR
- 1990–1991: KR
- 1991–1994: Keflavík
- 1994–1995: Valur
- 1995–1997: KR
- 1997–1998: Basket Bayreuth
- 1998–1999: Edinburgh Rocks
- 1999–2001: KR

Coaching
- 1999–2001: KR (assistant)

Career highlights
- As player: 3x Icelandic champion (1992, 1993, 2000); 3x Icelandic Cup winner (1991, 1993, 1994); Icelandic Super Cup winner (2000)

Career Úrvalsdeild karla statistics
- Points: 4,892 (22.1 ppg)
- Rebounds: 2,118 (9.6 rpg)
- Games: 221

Jónatan James Bow (born Jonathan James Bow on 16 February 1966) is an American-Icelandic former basketball player and a former member of the Icelandic national basketball team. He won the Icelandic championship three times with Keflavík and KR.

== Playing career ==
Bow's first professional stop was with Haukar in 1989. In September 1989, Haukar loaned Bow to KR to participate in the FIBA Korać Cup. With KR, Bow teamed up with Soviet Union national team player Anatolij Kovtun which was, according to FIBA, the first time an American and a Soviet player played together in the Cup. KR faced Hemel Royals in the first round. In the first game, Bow scored 16 points in KR's 53–45 victory. The game was delayed for two hours after Hemel's Darin Schubring broke the backboard with a dunk with 6:23 remaining of the game. In the second game which took place in London, Bow scored a game high 20 points in KR's 65–60 victory. In the Round of 32, KR faced Pau-Orthez. They lost the first game 78–97 despite 31 points from Bow. In the second game, Pau-Orthez knocked KR out with a 102–75 victory with Bow scoring 16 points.

Bow joined Keflavík in 1991 and helped the team to back-to-back national championships in 1992 and 1993. He was released by the team in January 1994 before the season's end.

Bow signed with Valur for the 1994–1995 season and finished as the league's second leading scorer with 28.9 points per game. After the season, he signed with KR.

In August 1997, Bow signed with Basket Bayreuth of the Basketball Bundesliga.

In August 1998, Bow signed with Edinburgh Rocks of the British Basketball League.

Bow returned to KR in 1999 and helped them win the Icelandic championship in 2000. He retired from basketball after KR's loss to Njarðvík in the 2001 Úrvalsdeild finals.

== National team career ==
Bow played 8 games for the Icelandic national basketball team from 1997 to 1999. In November 1997 he was denied by FIBA to play in Iceland's matches in the 1999 EuroBasket qualification as he had not had his Icelandic citizenship for the required number of years.

== Personal life ==
Bow received an Icelandic citizenship in 1996. His son is baseball player Kristófer Jonathan Bow who holds both American and Icelandic citizenships.
