= Maigonis Valdmanis =

Latvian basketball player

- Maigonis Valdmanis in 1933

Personal information
- Born: September 8, 1933 Riga, Latvia
- Died: October 30, 1999 (aged 66) Roja, Latvia
- Listed height: 5 ft 11 in (1.80 m)
- Listed weight: 165 lb (75 kg)
Medals
Men's basketball
Representing the Soviet Union
Olympic Games
Silver medal – second place	1952 Helsinki	Team competition
Silver medal – second place	1956 Melbourne	Team competition
Silver medal – second place	1960 Rome	Team competition
European Championship
Gold medal – first place	1957 Sofia	Soviet Union
Gold medal – first place	1959 Istanbul	Soviet Union
Gold medal – first place	1961 Belgrade	Soviet Union

Maigonis Valdmanis (September 8, 1933 – October 30, 1999) was a Soviet and Latvian basketball player and coach. He was born in Riga.

He played for Rīgas ASK and won three Euroleague titles (1958, 1959, 1960) and four Soviet national league championships (1955, 1956, 1957, 1958).

Playing for the USSR national basketball team Maigonis Valdmanis won three gold medals at EuroBasket 1957, EuroBasket 1959, EuroBasket 1961, and silver medals at the 1952, 1956 and 1960 Olympic Games.
