= Alvils Gulbis =

Latvian basketball player (1936–2021)

Alvils Gulbis (17 April 1936 – 27 February 2021) was a Latvian basketball player.

He played for Rīgas ASK winning 3 Euroleague titles (1958, 1959, 1960) and 3 Soviet national championships (1955, 1957, 1958). In 1964 he joined VEF Rīga where he spent five seasons as a player and later on five more seasons as head coach.

His grandson Ernests is a professional tennis player.
