= Anatolij Kovtun =

Soviet basketball player

Personal information
- Born: 31 December 1960 Soviet Union
- Died: 22 February 2005 (aged 44)
- Listed height: 206 cm (6 ft 9 in)
- Listed weight: 100 kg (220 lb)
- Position: Center

Career history
- 19??–198?: Celje
- 198?–198?: CSKA Moscow
- 1986–1987: Statyba
- 1986–1987: Dnipropetrovsk
- 1987–1989: Budivelnyk Kyiv
- 1989–1990: KR

Career highlights
- As player: 2× Soviet champion (1982, 1989); Icelandic champion (1990)

Anatolij Kovtun (31 December 1960 – 22 February 2005) was a Ukrainian basketball player and a member of the Soviet Union national basketball team. He won the Soviet championship twice, with CSKA Moscow and BC Budivelnyk Kyiv, and the Icelandic championship once with KR.

== Early life ==
Kovtun grew up in Simferopol where he started playing basketball.

== Playing career ==
Kovtun joined Úrvalsdeild karla club KR in 1989, under head coach László Németh, becoming the first Soviet player to play for an Icelandic team. With KR, Kovtun teamed up with American Jónatan James Bow, who was on a loan from Haukar, in the FIBA Korać Cup which was, according to FIBA, the first time an American and a Soviet player played together in the Cup. In the Úrvalsdeild, Kovtun averaged 16.9 points and 11.0 rebounds and helped KR to its first national championship in 11 years. During the summer of 1990, Kovtun was seriously injured in a car crash that killed his friend. After the accident, he was in a coma for six days and permanently lost the sight on one eye, effectively ending his professional career.

== Later life and death ==
Following his professional career, Kovtun ran a basketball school in Lviv in Ukraine and worked as a sports agent for basketball players. He died on 22 February 2005 at the age of 44.

== Personal life ==
Kovtun was married to Natalia Kovtun and together they had two daughters. His older daughter, Mariia Kovtun, played college basketball for Lamar University and Texas Woman's University, and professionally in Europe.
