= Valdis Muižnieks =

Latvian basketball player

Personal information
- Born: February 22, 1935 Riga, Latvia
- Died: November 29, 2013 (aged 78)
- Listed height: 183 cm (6 ft 0 in)
- Listed weight: 77 kg (170 lb)

Career information
- Playing career: 1951–1969
- Position: Shooting guard

Career history
- 1951: Dinamo Riga
- 1954–1964: Rīgas ASK
- 1964–1969: Rigas VEF

Career highlights
- 3× EuroLeague champion (1958, 1959, 1960); 4× Soviet national champion (1955–1958)
Medals
Men's basketball
Representing the Soviet Union
Olympic Games
Silver medal – second place	1956 Melbourne	Team competition
Silver medal – second place	1960 Rome	Team competition
Silver medal – second place	1964 Tokyo	Team competition
EuroBasket
Gold medal – first place	1957 Bulgaria	Soviet Union
Gold medal – first place	1959 Turkey	Soviet Union
Gold medal – first place	1961 Yugoslavia	Soviet Union

Valdis Muižnieks (February 22, 1935 – November 29, 2013) was a Latvian basketball player.

Muižnieks was born in Riga. He played for Rīgas ASK and won 3 Euroleague titles (1958, 1959, 1960) and 4 Soviet national championships (1955, 1956, 1957, 1958). Honoured Master of Sport of the USSR (1959).

Playing for Soviet national team, Muižnieks won 3 gold medals at Eurobasket 1957, Eurobasket 1959, Eurobasket 1961, and 3 silver medals at the Olympic Games (1956, 1960, 1964).
