= Raiskums Parish =

Parish of Latvia

- parish of Latvia
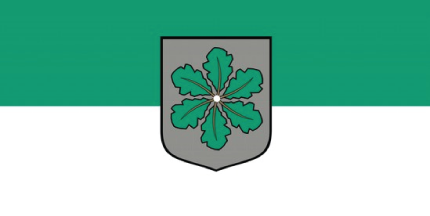
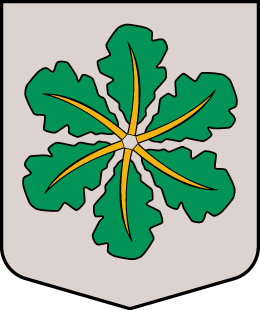
- Flag Coat of arms

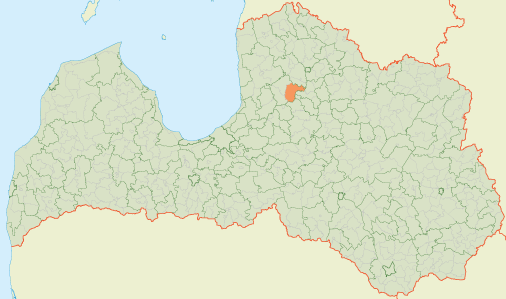
- Coordinates: 57°18′42″N 25°08′54″E
- Country: Latvia

Population (1 January 2026)
  - Total: 1,379

Raiskums Parish (Latvian: Raiskuma pagasts) is a territorial unit of Cēsis Municipality in the Vidzeme region of Latvia (Prior to the 2009 Administrative territorial reform it was part of Cēsis district).

== Towns, villages and settlements of Raiskums Parish ==
- Raiskums
