= 1960–61 FIBA European Champions Cup =

- League: FIBA European Champions Cup
- Sport: Basketball

Finals
- Champions: (Soviet Union) CSKA Moscow (1st title)
- Runners-up: (Soviet Union) Rīgas ASK

FIBA European Champions Cup seasons
- ← 1959–60 1961–62 →

The 1960–61 FIBA European Champions Cup was the fourth season of the European top-tier level professional basketball club competition FIBA European Champions Cup (now called EuroLeague). It was won by CSKA Moscow, after they defeated Rīgas ASK, the reigning three-time defending champions, and the first major dynasty of European professional club basketball . CSKA lost the first game 66–61, but won the second 87–62, and thus became the fourth straight European champions from the Soviet Union League.

== Competition system ==
24 teams. European national domestic league champions, plus the then current FIBA European Champions Cup title holders only, playing in a tournament system. The Finals were a two-game home and away aggregate.

== First round ==
Team 1	Agg.	Team 2	1st leg	2nd leg
Urania Genève Sport (Switzerland)	107–164	(Italy) Idrolitina Bologna	62–68	45–96
Wissenschaft (East Germany)	110–171	(Bulgaria) Levski-Spartak	54–85	56–86
USC Heidelberg (West Germany)	125–180	(Poland) Legia Warsaw	67-91	58-89
Galatasaray (Turkey)	137–96	(Greece) Olympiacos	72-41	65-55
Sparta Bertrange (Luxembourg)	75–137	(Austria) Engelmann Wien	27-53	48-84
Sporting (Portugal)	92–149	(Belgium) Antwerpse	51-62	41-87
KFUM Söder (Sweden)	98–142	(Socialist Federal Republic of Yugoslavia) OKK Beograd	50-53	48-89
The Wolves Amsterdam (Netherlands)	106–153	(Czechoslovakia) Spartak Praha Sokolovo	52-57	54-96
Étoile Charleville-Mézières (France)	110–100	(Morocco) Casablancais	55-47	55-53

== Second round ==
Team 1	Agg.	Team 2	1st leg	2nd leg
Galatasaray (Turkey)	79–93	(Israel) Hapoel Tel Aviv	40–39	39–54
Étoile Charleville-Mézières (France)	63–163	(Soviet Union) CSKA Moscow	28-68	35-95
Levski-Spartak (Bulgaria)	114–138	(Poland) Legia Warsaw	67-62	47-76
Engelmann Wien (Austria)	100–159	(Spain) Real Madrid	53-85	47-74
Antwerpse (Belgium)	68–47	(Socialist Federal Republic of Yugoslavia) OKK Beograd	66-47	2-0*
Torpan Pojat (Finland)	103–133	(Czechoslovakia) Spartak Praha Sokolovo	56-65	47-68
Idrolitina Bologna (Italy)	124–126	(Romania) CCA București	70–56	54–70

*The second leg was cancelled after the Yugoslavian police refused to guarantee the safety of the Belgian team, whose members received serious threats upon arrival to Belgrade, as a result of the mysterious death of Patrice Lumumba, Prime Minister of Congo, on February 11, 1961. The Soviet government, an ally to Lumumba, blamed the Belgian secret service as the instigator of his murder in the former Belgian colony, and this translated into several riots in the communist countries against the Belgian interests. Since the second leg could not be played, Antwerpse received a 2–0 w.o. in this game and qualified for the next round.

Automatically qualified to the quarter-finals

- (Soviet Union) Rīgas ASK (title holder)

== Quarterfinals ==
Team 1	Agg.	Team 2	1st leg	2nd leg
Rīgas ASK (Soviet Union)	162–134	(Israel) Hapoel Tel Aviv	84–60	78–74
Spartak Praha Sokolovo (Czechoslovakia)	107–115	(Romania) CCA București	60–50	47–65
Legia Warsaw (Poland)	145–183	(Soviet Union) CSKA Moscow	72-98	73-85
Antwerpse (Belgium)	128–177	(Spain) Real Madrid	62-89	66-88

== Semifinals ==
Team 1	Agg.	Team 2	1st leg	2nd leg
Real Madrid (Spain)	123–141	(Soviet Union) Rīgas ASK	78-75	45-66
CSKA Moscow (Soviet Union)	171–115	(Romania) CCA București	98–58	73–57

== Finals ==
Team 1	Agg.	Team 2	1st leg	2nd leg
CSKA Moscow (Soviet Union)	148–128	(Soviet Union) Rīgas ASK	87-62	61-66

1st leg:Daugava Stadion, Rīga, 14 July 1961; Attendance:8,000

2nd leg:Lenin Stadion, Moscow, 22 July 1961; Attendance:15,000

1960–61 FIBA European Champions Cup
Champions

CSKA Moscow
1st Title

== Awards ==
=== FIBA European Champions Cup Finals Top Scorer ===
- (Soviet Union) Viktor Zubkov ( (Soviet Union) CSKA Moscow)
