= 1958–59 FIBA European Champions Cup =

- League: FIBA European Champions Cup
- Sport: Basketball

Finals
- Champions: (Soviet Union) Rīgas ASK (2nd title)
- Runners-up: (Bulgaria) Academic

FIBA European Champions Cup seasons
- ← 1958 1959–60 →

The 1958–59 FIBA European Champions Cup' was the second season of the European top-tier level professional basketball club competition FIBA European Champions Cup (now called EuroLeague). It was won by Rīgas ASK for the second straight time, after they again beat Academic, in both EuroLeague Finals games (79–58 & 69–67). Riga defeated Lech Poznań in the semifinals, and Honvéd in the quarterfinals.

== Competition system ==
21 teams. European national domestic league champions, plus the then current FIBA European Champions Cup title holders only, playing in a tournament system. The Finals were a two-game home and away aggregate.

== First round ==
Team 1	Agg.	Team 2	1st leg	2nd leg
Étoile Charleville-Mézières (France)	140–67	(Portugal) Barreirense	77–40	63–27
Etzella (Luxembourg)	0–4*	(Poland) Lech Poznań	0–2	0–2
Spartak ZJŠ Brno (Czechoslovakia)	188–125	(Austria) Engelmann Wien	96–56	92–69
CCA București (Romania)	147–124	(East Germany) Wissenschaft Halle	81–59	66–65
Honvéd (Hungary)	4–0*	(Sweden) Sundbyberg	2–0	2–0
Urania Genève Sport (Switzerland)	104–134	(Spain) Real Madrid	58–63	46–71

*Etzella and Sundbyberg withdrew before the competition due to financial problems, so Lech Poznań and Honvéd received a forfeit (2–0) in both games

== Second round ==
Team 1	Agg.	Team 2	1st leg	2nd leg
AEK (Greece)	129–209	(Socialist Federal Republic of Yugoslavia) OKK Beograd	76–84	53–125
Pantterit (Finland)	124–173	(Belgium) Antwerpse	63–60	61–113
Lech Poznań (Poland)	155–148	(Czechoslovakia) Spartak ZJŠ Brno	87–63	68–85
Real Madrid (Spain)	115–118	(France) Étoile Charleville-Mézières	50–39	65–79
Simmenthal Milano (Italy)	–*	(United Arab Republic) Al-Gezira	72–47	0–2 (f)
Academic (Bulgaria)	147–108	(Israel) Maccabi Tel Aviv	69–50	78–58
Honvéd (Hungary)	166–133	(Romania) CCA București	86–52	80–81

*Simmenthal Milano withdrew after the 1st leg, team rejected playing on an outdoor court.

Automatically qualified to the quarter-finals

- (Soviet Union) Rīgas ASK (title holder)

== Quarterfinals ==
Team 1	Agg.	Team 2	1st leg	2nd leg
Antwerpse (Belgium)	141–194	(Poland) Lech Poznań	80–89	61–105
Rīgas ASK (Soviet Union)	159–142	(Hungary) Honvéd	79–54	80–88
Étoile Charleville-Mézières (France)	149–160	(Socialist Federal Republic of Yugoslavia) OKK Beograd	75–73	74–87
Al-Gezira (United Arab Republic)	65–71	(Bulgaria) Academic	65–69	0–2*

*The second leg was not played as Al-Gezira didn't travel to Bulgaria due to financial reasons, and therefore Academic received a forfeit (2-0).

== Semifinals ==
Team 1	Agg.	Team 2	1st leg	2nd leg
Lech Poznań (Poland)	153–166	(Soviet Union) Rīgas ASK	84–76	69–90
OKK Beograd (Socialist Federal Republic of Yugoslavia)	156–163	(Bulgaria) Academic	79–69	77–94

== Finals ==
Team 1	Agg.	Team 2	1st leg	2nd leg
Rīgas ASK (Soviet Union)	148–125	(Bulgaria) Academic	79–58	69–67

1958–59 FIBA European Champions Cup
Champions

Rīgas ASK
2nd Title

== Awards ==
=== FIBA European Champions Cup Finals Top Scorer ===
- (Soviet Union) Jānis Krūmiņš ( (Soviet Union) Rīgas ASK)
