= 1959–60 FIBA European Champions Cup =

- League: FIBA European Champions Cup
- Sport: Basketball

Finals
- Champions: (Soviet Union) Rīgas ASK (3rd title)
- Runners-up: (Soviet Union) Dinamo Tbilisi

FIBA European Champions Cup seasons
- ← 1958–59 1960–61 →

The 1959–60 FIBA European Champions Cup was third season of the European top-tier level professional basketball club competition FIBA European Champions Cup (now called EuroLeague). It was won by Rīgas ASK for the third straight time, an accomplishment only achieved again by Jugoplastika in the late 1980s, in 1989–1991. In the EuroLeague Finals, Riga defeated the Soviet Union League club, Dinamo Tbilisi, in both final games (51–61 & 62–69). Riga defeated Slovan Orbis Prague in the semifinals, and AŠK Olimpija in the quarterfinals.

== Competition system ==
21 teams. European national domestic league champions, plus the then current FIBA European Champions Cup title holders only, playing in a tournament system. The Finals were a two-game home and away aggregate.

== First round ==
| Team 1 | Agg. | Team 2 | 1st leg | 2nd leg |
|---|---|---|---|---|
| US Marocaine (Morocco) | 95–92 | (Portugal) Académica de Coimbra | 54–48 | 41–44 |
| PAOK (Greece) | 121–159 | (Romania) CCA București | 61–80 | 60–79 |
| Wissenschaft (East Germany) | 125–188 | (Finland) Pantterit | 88–84 | 66–78 |
| (Italy) | 0–4* | (Austria) Union Babenberg | 0-2 | 0-2 |
| USC Heidelberg (West Germany) | 90–113 | (Switzerland) Urania Genève Sport | 46-55 | 44-58 |
| Sparta Bertrange (Luxembourg) | 92–137 | (France) Chorale Mulsant | 47-60 | 45-77 |
| Fenerbahçe (Turkey) | 4–0** | (Israel) Maccabi Tel Aviv | 2-0 | 2-0 |

*Originally, the Champion of the Italian League was drawn to play against the Austrian champion, but the former was Simmenthal Milano, who was banned in European competition. Since the Italian Federation refused to name another entrant in Champions Cup, Union Babenberg received a forfeit (2-0) in both games.

**Maccabi Tel Aviv withdrew before the competition due to internal problems and Fenerbahçe received a forfeit (2-0) in both games.

== Second round ==
| Team 1 | Agg. | Team 2 | 1st leg | 2nd leg |
|---|---|---|---|---|
| Union Babenberg (Austria) | 134–184 | (Socialist Federal Republic of Yugoslavia) AŠK Olimpija | 83–84 | 51–100 |
| Fenerbahçe (Turkey) | 116–139 | (Bulgaria) Academic | 61-69 | 55-70 |
| Marocaine (Morocco) | 126–180 | (Spain) CF Barcelona | 65–82 | 61–98 |
| Pantterit (Finland) | 162–184 | (Poland) Polonia Warszawa | 84–88 | 78–96 |
| Urania Genève Sport (Switzerland) | 128–148 | (Czechoslovakia) Slovan Orbis Praha | 54–62 | 74–80 |
| Chorale Mulsant (France) | 115–109 | (Belgium) Antwerpse | 54-53 | 61-56 |
| CCA București (Romania) | 155–173 | (Soviet Union) Dinamo Tbilisi | 87–83 | 68–90 |

Automatically qualified to the quarter finals

- (Soviet Union) Rīgas ASK (title holder)

== Quarterfinals ==
| Team 1 | Agg. | Team 2 | 1st leg | 2nd leg |
|---|---|---|---|---|
| Dinamo Tbilisi (Soviet Union) | 145–136 | (Bulgaria) Academic | 76–64 | 69–72 |
| CF Barcelona (Spain) | 105–114 | (Poland) Polonia Warszawa | 64–65 | 41–49 |
| AŠK Olimpija (Socialist Federal Republic of Yugoslavia) | 142–174 | (Soviet Union) Rīgas ASK | 79–95 | 63–79 |
| Chorale Mulsant (France) | 120–124 | (Czechoslovakia) Slovan Orbis Praha | 68-59 | 52-65 |

== Semifinals ==
| Team 1 | Agg. | Team 2 | 1st leg | 2nd leg |
|---|---|---|---|---|
| Dinamo Tbilisi (Soviet Union) | 152–126 | (Poland) Polonia Warszawa | 88–65 | 64–61 |
| Rīgas ASK (Soviet Union) | 151–114 | (Czechoslovakia) Slovan Orbis Praha | 82-55 | 69-59 |

== Finals ==
| Team 1 | Agg. | Team 2 | 1st leg | 2nd leg |
|---|---|---|---|---|
| Dinamo Tbilisi (Soviet Union) | 113–130 | (Soviet Union) Rīgas ASK | 51–61 | 62–69 |

1st leg: Vere Park, Tbilisi, 10 May 1960

Vere Park during that Final

2nd leg: Daugava Stadion, Rīga, 15 May 1960;Attendance:17,000

1959–60 FIBA European Champions Cup
Champions

Rīgas ASK
3rd Title

== Awards ==
=== FIBA European Champions Cup Finals Top Scorer ===
- (Soviet Union) Jānis Krūmiņš ( (Soviet Union) Rīgas ASK)
