= USSR Basketball Cup =

- Sport: Basketball
- Founded: 1949
- Folded: 1987
- Country: Soviet Union
- Last champions: Spartak Leningrad (2nd title)
- Most titles: Dinamo Tbilisi; CSKA Moscow (3 titles both)
- Related competitions: USSR Premier League

The USSR Basketball Cup, or Soviet Union Basketball Cup, was the national basketball cup competition of the former Soviet Union. The first USSR Cup was held in the year 1949, and the last one was held in the year 1987. The competition was not held every year, as it was only contested 11 times between 1949 and 1987. However, it was initially held every year between 1949 and 1953.

The last team to win the cup was Spartak Leningrad, in 1987.

== Title holders ==
- 1948–49 Dinamo Tbilisi
- 1949–50 Dinamo Tbilisi
- 1950–51 Georgian SSR Team
- 1951–52 Dinamo Riga
- 1952–53 Žalgiris
- 1953–68 Not held
- 1968–69 Dinamo Tbilisi
- 1969–71 Not held
- 1971–72 CSKA Moscow
- 1972–73 CSKA Moscow
- 1973–77 Not held
- 1977–78 Spartak Leningrad
- 1978–81 Not held
- 1981–82 CSKA Moscow
- 1982–84 Not held
- 1984–85 Shakhtar Donetsk.
- 1985–86
- 1986–87 Spartak Leningrad
- 1987–92 Not held

== The finals ==
For finals not played on a single match, * precedes the score of the team playing at home.

Season	Champions	Score	Runners-up	Venue	Location	MVP
(Soviet Union) USSR Basketball Cup
1948–49	Dinamo Tbilisi	24–19	Dinamo Riga		Tbilisi	N/A
1949–50	Dinamo Tbilisi	49–36	Dynamo Moscow		Moscow	N/A
1950–51	Georgian SSR Team	37–28	VVS Moscow		Leningrad	N/A
1951–52	Dinamo Riga	53–44	VVS Moscow		Kuybyshev	N/A
1952–53	Žalgiris	55–41	Dinamo Tbilisi		Moscow	N/A
1953–68	Not held					
1968–69	Dinamo Tbilisi	88–78	Stroitel			N/A
1969–71	Not held					
1971–72	CSKA Moscow	277–229	Stroitel		Kiev & Moscow	N/A
1972–73	CSKA Moscow	152–145	Dinamo Tbilisi		Moscow & Tbilisi	N/A
1973–77	Not held					
1977–78	Spartak Leningrad		Kalev			N/A
1978–81	Not held					
1981–82	CSKA Moscow					N/A
1982–86	Not held					
1986–87	Spartak Leningrad					N/A

== Performance by club ==
Rank	Club	Titles	Runner-up	Champion Years
1.	Dinamo Tbilisi	3	3	1948–49, 1949–50, 1968–69
2.	CSKA Moscow	3	0	1971–72, 1972–73, 1981–82
3.	Spartak Leningrad	2	0	1977–78, 1986–87
4.	Dinamo Riga	1	1	1951–52
5.	Georgian SSR Team	1	0	1950–51
6.	Žalgiris	1	0	1952–53
7.	VVS Moscow	0	2	
8.	Stroitel	0	2	
9.	Dynamo Moscow	0	1	
10.	Kalev	0	1	

== Successor competition ==
- Russian Cup: (1999–present)

== See also ==
- Russian Professional Championship: (1991–present)
- Russian Super League 1: (1992–present)
- Russian Professional League: (2010–2013)
- Russian Cup (1999–present)
- VTB United League: (2008–present)
- USSR Premier League: (1923–1992)
- Russian basketball league system
- Basketball in Russia
