= 1958 FIBA European Champions Cup =

- Season: 1958
- Teams: 23

Finals
- Champions: (Soviet Union) Rīgas ASK (1st title)
- Runners-up: (Bulgaria) Academic
- Finals MVP: Jānis Krūmiņš (ASK)

Statistical leaders
Points	Viktor Radev (Academic)	251 points

The 1958 FIBA European Champions Cup was the inaugural season of the European top-tier level professional basketball club competition FIBA European Champions Cup (now called EuroLeague). It was won by Rīgas ASK, after they won both EuroLeague Finals games against Academic. Previously, they had not played the semifinals, as Real Madrid was not allowed to travel to Soviet Riga by the Francoist authorities. The first game was held on February 22, 1958, in Brussels, Belgium, where Belgian League champion Royal IV, defeated the Luxembourger League champions, Etzella Ettelbruck, by a score of 82–43. The most notable contributors to Riga's first title included center Jānis Krūmiņš and head coach Alexander Gomelsky.

== Competition system ==
23 teams. European national domestic league champions only, playing in a tournament system. The Finals were a two-game home and away aggregate.

== Preliminary round ==
=== Group A (Northeast Europe) ===
Team 1	Agg.	Team 2	1st leg	2nd leg
Rīgas ASK (Soviet Union)	176–112	(East Germany) Wissenschaft Berlin	85–56	91–56
Pantterit (Finland)	131–133	(Poland) Legia Warsaw	64–62	67–71

=== Group B (Central Europe) ===
==== First round ====
Team 1	Agg.	Team 2	1st leg	2nd leg
Jonction (Switzerland)	54–84*	(Czechoslovakia) Slovan Orbis	54–84	
Union Babenberg (Austria)	98–191	(Hungary) Honvéd	55–83	43-108
Simmenthal Milano (Italy)	205–89	(Netherlands) The Wolves Amsterdam	115–47	90-42

*Series decided over one game played in Switzerland.

==== Second round ====
The winners of the three pairs in Group B played against each other, in a tournament held in Milan, in order to determine the two clubs that would progress to the Quarterfinals

Team 1	Score	Team 2
Simmenthal Milano (Italy)	65 – 47	(Czechoslovakia) Slovan Orbis Praha
Slovan Orbis Praha (Czechoslovakia)	52–61	(Hungary) Honvéd
Simmenthal Milano (Italy)	80–72	(Hungary) Honvéd

Key to colors
Qualified to Quarter-finals
Eliminated

Team	Pld	W	L	PF	PA	PD	Pts
(Italy) Simmenthal Milano	2	2	0	145	119	+26	4
(Hungary) Honvéd	2	1	1	133	132	+1	3
(Czechoslovakia) Slovan Orbis Praha	2	0	2	99	126	−27	2

=== Group C (Southeast Europe) ===
==== First round ====
Team 1	Agg.	Team 2	1st leg	2nd leg
Jeunesse Sportivo Alep (Syria)	–*	(Lebanon) Union Beirut	–	–

*Union Beirut withdrew

==== Second round ====
Team 1	Agg.	Team 2	1st leg	2nd leg
Panellinios (Greece)	132–138	(Romania) CCA București	60–63	72–75
Modaspor (Turkey)	112–160	(Socialist Federal Republic of Yugoslavia) AŠK Olimpija	67–74	45–86
Academic (Bulgaria)	157–101	(Syria) Jeunesse Sportivo Alep	84–58	73–43

==== Third round ====
Team 1	Agg.	Team 2	1st leg	2nd leg
Academic (Bulgaria)	161–144	(Socialist Federal Republic of Yugoslavia) AŠK Olimpija	81–80	80–64
CCA București (Romania)	147–126	(Israel) Maccabi Tel Aviv	84–65	63–61

=== Group D (Southwest Europe) ===
==== First round ====
Team 1	Agg.	Team 2	1st leg	2nd leg
Royal IV (Belgium)	145–79	(Luxembourg) Etzella	82–43	63–36

==== Second round ====
Team 1	Agg.	Team 2	1st leg	2nd leg
Royal IV (Belgium)	174–127	(France) ASVEL	81–51	93–76
Barreirense (Portugal)	90–154	(Spain) Real Madrid	51–68	40–86

== Knockout stage ==
Quarterfinals
(Romania) CCA București	64	78	142
(Bulgaria) Academic	73	77	150
(Italy) Simmenthal Milano	80	85	165
(Hungary) Honvéd	72	95	167
(Spain) Real Madrid	78	43	121
(Belgium) Royal IV	59	57	116
(Soviet Union) Rīgas ASK	93	61	154
(Poland) Legia Warsaw	59	63	122

Semifinals
(Bulgaria) Academic	89	76	165
(Hungary) Honvéd	87	64	151
(Spain) Real Madrid	0	0	0
(Soviet Union) Rīgas ASK	2	2	4

Final
(Bulgaria) Academic	81	71	152
(Soviet Union) Rīgas ASK	86	84	170

=== Quarterfinals ===
Team 1	Agg.	Team 2	1st leg	2nd leg
CCA București (Romania)	142–150	(Bulgaria) Academic	64–73	78–77
Simmenthal Milano (Italy)	165–167	(Hungary) Honvéd	80–72*	85–95
Real Madrid (Spain)	121–116	(Belgium) Royal IV	78–59	43–57
Rīgas ASK (Soviet Union)	154–122	(Poland) Legia Warsaw	93–59	61–63

*The result of the game between the two clubs in the tournament of the 1st Round's Group B was used as a result for the 1st leg.

=== Semifinals ===
Team 1	Agg.	Team 2	1st leg	2nd leg
Honvéd (Hungary)	151–165	(Bulgaria) Academic	87–89	64–76
Rīgas ASK (Soviet Union)	– *	(Spain) Real Madrid		

*Real Madrid withdrew as they were not allowed to travel to the Soviet Union.

=== Finals ===
Team 1	Agg.	Team 2	1st leg	2nd leg
Rīgas ASK (Soviet Union)	170–152	(Bulgaria) Academic	86–81	84–71

1958 FIBA European Champions Cup
Champions

Rīgas ASK
1st Title

== Awards ==
=== FIBA European Champions Cup Finals Top Scorer ===
- (Soviet Union) Jānis Krūmiņš ( (Soviet Union) Rīgas ASK)
