= USSR Premier Basketball League =

Basketball league in Soviet Union

- Founded: 1923
- First season: 1923–24
- Folded: 1992
- Country: (Soviet Union) (Commonwealth of Independent States)
- Level on pyramid: 1st tier on Soviet Pyramid
- Related competitions: USSR Cup
- Last champions: Spartak Saint Petersburg (2nd title)
- Most championships: CSKA Moscow (24 titles)

The USSR Premier Basketball League, or Soviet Union Premier Basketball League (also called Supreme League), was the first-tier men's professional basketball league in the Soviet Union. The league existed from 1923 to 1991, as the top professional basketball league of the Soviet Union, and from 1991 to 1992, as the top professional basketball league of the CIS. In the years 1924, 1928, 1934, 1935, 1936, 1956, 1959, 1963, and 1967, the league was contested by city teams, regional teams, and state national teams, rather than individual sports clubs.

CSKA Moscow was the league's most successful club, having won the league's championship 24 times, including winning 9 consecutive championships, from 1976 to 1984. The league featured the players of the senior men's Soviet Union national basketball team. The league exists in a similar format today, as the VTB United League. Although, the VTB United League can include clubs from countries that were not a part of the Soviet Union.

== USSR League history ==
- 1923–24 to 1935–36 Soviet Union Regional League
- 1936–37 to 1990–91 Soviet Union National League
- ......1991 to 1992...... CIS National League

== Title holders ==
- 1923–24: Team Moscow
- 1924–27: Not held
- 1927–28: Team Moscow
- 1928–33: Not held
- 1933–34: Team Leningrad
- 1934–35: Team Moscow
- 1935–36: Team Leningrad
- 1936–37: Dynamo Moscow
- 1937–38: Burevestnik Leningrad
- 1938–39: Lokomotiv Moscow
- 1939–40: Burevestnik Leningrad
- 1940–43: Not held
- 1943–44: Armia Tbilisi
- 1944–45: CDKA Moscow
- 1945–46: Armia Tbilisi
- 1946–47: SKIF Kaunas
- 1947–48: Dynamo Moscow
- 1948–49: Tartu Ülikool
- 1949–50: Dinamo Tbilisi
- 1950–51: Žalgiris Kaunas
- 1951–52: VVS Moscow
- 1952–53: Dinamo Tbilisi
- 1953–54: Dinamo Tbilisi
- 1954–55: Rīgas ASK
- 1955–56: Latvian SSR Team
- 1956–57: Rīgas ASK
- 1957–58: Rīgas ASK
- 1958–59: Team Moscow
- 1959–60: CSKA Moscow
- 1960–61: CSKA Moscow
- 1961–62: CSKA Moscow
- 1962–63: Team Moscow
- 1963–64: CSKA Moscow
- 1964–65: CSKA Moscow
- 1965–66: CSKA Moscow
- 1966–67: Ukrainian SSR Team
- 1967–68: Dinamo Tbilisi
- 1968–69: CSKA Moscow
- 1969–70: CSKA Moscow
- 1970–71: CSKA Moscow
- 1971–72: CSKA Moscow
- 1972–73: CSKA Moscow
- 1973–74: CSKA Moscow
- 1974–75: Spartak Leningrad
- 1975–76: CSKA Moscow
- 1976–77: CSKA Moscow
- 1977–78: CSKA Moscow
- 1978–79: CSKA Moscow
- 1979–80: CSKA Moscow
- 1980–81: CSKA Moscow
- 1981–82: CSKA Moscow
- 1982–83: CSKA Moscow
- 1983–84: CSKA Moscow
- 1984–85: Žalgiris Kaunas
- 1985–86: Žalgiris Kaunas
- 1986–87: Žalgiris Kaunas
- 1987–88: CSKA Moscow
- 1988–89: Budivelnyk Kyiv
- 1989–90: CSKA Moscow
- 1990–91: Kalev Tallinn
- 1991–92: Spartak Saint Petersburg

== League medalists ==
Year	Champions	Finalists	3rd Place	Notes
1924	Team Moscow	Team Ural		
1928	Team Moscow	Team Ukraine SSR		
1934	Team Leningrad	Team Moscow	Team Odessa	
1935	Team Moscow	Team Leningrad	Team Tiflis	
1936	Team Leningrad	Team Moscow	Team Odessa	
1937	Dynamo Moscow	Red Dawn Leningrad	Lokomotiv Moscow	The First club Championship of the USSR
1938	Burevestnik Leningrad	Lokomotiv Moscow	GOLIFK Leningrad	
1939	Lokomotiv Moscow	GOLIFK Leningrad	Lokomotiv Tbilisi	
1940	Burevestnik Leningrad	Lokomotiv Tbilisi	Lokomotiv Moscow	
1944	Armia Tbilisi	Dynamo Moscow	Lokomotiv Moscow	
1945	CSKA Moscow	Armia Tbilisi	Kalev Tallinn	
1946	Armia Tbilisi	CSKA Moscow	Dynamo Moscow	
1947	SKIF Kaunas	Dinamo Tbilisi	CSKA Moscow	
1948	Dynamo Moscow	Stroitel Moscow	Dinamo Tbilisi	
1949	USK Tartu	Žalgiris Kaunas	VVS Moscow	
1950	Dinamo Tbilisi	USK Tartu	VVS Moscow	
1951	Žalgiris Kaunas	VVS Moscow	USK Tartu	
1952	VVS Moscow	Žalgiris Kaunas	Dinamo Tbilisi	
1953	Dinamo Tbilisi	CSKA Moscow	Žalgiris Kaunas	
1954	Dinamo Tbilisi	CSKA Moscow	Žalgiris Kaunas	
1955	Rīgas ASK	CSKA Moscow	Žalgiris Kaunas	
1956	Latvian SSR Team	Team Moscow	Lithuanian SSR Team	USSR Spartakiad
1957	Rīgas ASK	CSKA Moscow	Dynamo Moscow	
1958	Rīgas ASK	CSKA Moscow	Dynamo Moscow	
1959	Team Moscow	Georgian SSR Team	Latvian SSR Team	USSR Spartakiad
1960	CSKA Moscow	Dinamo Tbilisi	VEF Riga	
1961	CSKA Moscow	Dinamo Tbilisi	Rīgas ASK	
1962	CSKA Moscow	Rīgas ASK	Budivelnyk Kyiv	
1963	Team Moscow	Ukrainian SSR Team	Latvian SSR Team	USSR Spartakiad
1964	CSKA Moscow	Rīgas ASK	Budivelnyk Kyiv	
1965	CSKA Moscow	Budivelnyk Kyiv	Dinamo Tbilisi	
1966	CSKA Moscow	Budivelnyk Kyiv	VEF Riga	
1967	Ukrainian SSR Team	Estonian SSR Team	Team Moscow	USSR Spartakiad
1968	Dinamo Tbilisi	CSKA Kyiv	CSKA Moscow	
1969	CSKA Moscow	Dinamo Tbilisi	Spartak Leningrad	
1970	CSKA Moscow	Spartak Leningrad	Budivelnyk Kyiv	
1971	CSKA Moscow	Spartak Leningrad	Žalgiris Kaunas	
1972	CSKA Moscow	Spartak Leningrad	CSKA Kyiv	
1973	CSKA Moscow	Spartak Leningrad	Žalgiris Kaunas	
1974	CSKA Moscow	Spartak Leningrad	Budivelnyk Kyiv	
1975	Spartak Leningrad	CSKA Moscow	Dynamo Moscow	
1976	CSKA Moscow	Spartak Leningrad	Dynamo Moscow	
1977	CSKA Moscow	Budivelnyk Kyiv	Dinamo Tbilisi	
1978	CSKA Moscow	Spartak Leningrad	Žalgiris Kaunas	
1979	CSKA Moscow	Budivelnyk Kyiv	Statyba Vilnius (Rytas Vilnius)	
1980	CSKA Moscow	Žalgiris Kaunas	Dynamo Moscow	
1981	CSKA Moscow	Budivelnyk Kyiv	Spartak Leningrad	
1982	CSKA Moscow	Budivelnyk Kyiv	Dynamo Moscow	
1983	CSKA Moscow	Žalgiris Kaunas	Budivelnyk Kyiv	
1984	CSKA Moscow	Žalgiris Kaunas	Budivelnyk Kyiv	
1985	Žalgiris Kaunas	CSKA Moscow	Spartak Leningrad	
1986	Žalgiris Kaunas	CSKA Moscow	Spartak Leningrad	
1987	Žalgiris Kaunas	CSKA Moscow	Spartak Leningrad	
1988	CSKA Moscow	Žalgiris Kaunas	Budivelnyk Kyiv	
1989	Budivelnyk Kyiv	Žalgiris Kaunas	CSKA Moscow	
1990	CSKA Moscow	Dynamo Moscow	Budivelnyk Kyiv	
1991	Kalev Tallinn	Spartak Leningrad	VEF Riga	
1992	Spartak Saint Petersburg	Alma-Ata	Dynamo Moscow	The club championship of the CIS

- Most championships won: CSKA Moscow: 24
- Most consecutive championships won: CSKA Moscow: 9 (1976–1984)

== Titles by club ==
Titles	Club	Years
24	CSKA Moscow	1944–45, 1959–60, 1960–61, 1961–62, 1963–64, 1964–65, 1965–66, 1968–69, 1969–70, 1970–71, 1971–72, 1972–73, 1973–74, 1975–76, 1976–77, 1977–78, 1978–79, 1979–80, 1980–81, 1981–82, 1982–83, 1983–84, 1987–88, 1989–90
5	Žalgiris Kaunas	1946–47, 1950–51, 1984–85, 1985–86, 1986–87
5	Team Moscow	1923–24, 1927–28, 1934–35, 1958–59, 1962–63
5	Dinamo Tbilisi	1949–50, 1952–53, 1953–54, 1967–68
3	Rīgas ASK	1954–55, 1956–57, 1957–58
2	Team Leningrad	1933–34, 1935–36
2	Burevestnik Leningrad	1937–38, 1939–40
2	Armia Tbilisi	1943–44, 1944–46
2	Dynamo Moscow	1936–37, 1947–48
2	Spartak Saint Petersburg	1974–75, 1991–92
1	Lokomotiv Moscow	1938–39
1	Tartu Ülikool	1948–49
1	VVS Moscow	1951–52
1	Latvian SSR Team	1955–56
1	Ukrainian SSR Team	1966–67
1	Budivelnyk Kyiv	1988–89
1	Kalev Tallinn	1990–91

== Titles by Republic ==
Titles	Republic
39	(Russian Soviet Federative Socialist Republic) Russian SFSR
6	(Georgian Soviet Socialist Republic) Georgian SSR
5	(Lithuanian Soviet Socialist Republic) Lithuanian SSR
4	(Latvian Soviet Socialist Republic) Latvian SSR
2	(Ukrainian Soviet Socialist Republic) Ukrainian SSR
2	(Estonian Soviet Socialist Republic) Estonian SSR

== Historical players ==
- By Soviet Republic of birth:

(Armenian Soviet Socialist Republic) Armenian SSR:

- Armenak Alachachian

(Azerbaijan Soviet Socialist Republic) Azerbaijan SSR:

- Aleksandr Petrov

(Byelorussian Soviet Socialist Republic) Byelorussian SSR:

- Ivan Edeshko

(Estonian Soviet Socialist Republic) Estonian SSR:

- Heino Enden
- Heino Kruus
- Ilmar Kullam
- Jaak Lipso
- Joann Lõssov
- Tiit Sokk
- Priit Tomson

(Georgian Soviet Socialist Republic) Georgian SSR:

- Mikheil Korkia
- Otar Korkia
- Guram Minashvili
- Levan Moseshvili
- Zurab Sakandelidze
- Vladimer Ugrekhelidze

(Kazakh Soviet Socialist Republic) Kazakh SSR:

- Alzhan Zharmukhamedov

(Karelo-Finnish Soviet Socialist Republic) Karelo-Finnish SSR:

- Andrey Makeyev

(Latvian Soviet Socialist Republic) Latvian SSR:

- Alvils Gulbis
- Oļģerts Hehts
- Juris Kalniņš
- Jānis Krūmiņš
- Igors Miglinieks
- Raimonds Miglinieks
- Valdis Muižnieks
- Maigonis Valdmanis
- Valdis Valters
- Gundars Vētra

(Lithuanian Soviet Socialist Republic) Lithuanian SSR:

- Stepas Butautas
- Raimundas Čivilis
- Valdemaras Chomičius
- Gintaras Einikis
- Gintaras Krapikas
- Sergejus Jovaiša
- Artūras Karnišovas
- Rimas Kurtinaitis
- Algirdas Linkevičius
- Darius Lukminas
- Šarūnas Marčiulionis
- Modestas Paulauskas
- Arvydas Sabonis
- Arūnas Visockas

(Russian Soviet Federative Socialist Republic) Russian SFSR:

- Vladimir Andreev
- Vladimir Arzamaskov
- Sergei Bazarevich
- Sasha Belov
- Sergei Belov
- Arkady Bochkaryov
- Ivan Dvorny
- Valeri Fedorov
- Andrei Fetisov
- Vadim Kapranov
- Vasily Karasev
- Vyacheslav Khrynin
- Evgeni Kisurin
- Anatoly Konev
- Yuri Korneev
- Sergei Kovalenko
- Igor Kudelin
- Andrey Lopatov
- Mikhail Mikhailov
- Valery Miloserdov
- Anatoly Myshkin
- Nikita Morgunov
- Viktor Pankrashkin
- Sergei Panov
- Evgeniy Pashutin
- Yuri Selikhov
- Mikhail Semyonov
- Sergei Tarakanov
- Vladimir Tkachenko
- Aleksandr Travin
- Gennadi Volnov
- Stanislav Yeryomin
- Viktor Zubkov

(Ukrainian Soviet Socialist Republic) Ukrainian SSR:

- Sasha Volkov
- Anatolij Kovtun
- Valery Goborov
- Anatoli Polivoda
- Sergei Kovalenko
- Aleksandr Salnikov
- Alexander Belostenny

(Uzbek Soviet Socialist Republic) Uzbek SSR:

- Valeri Tikhonenko

== Historical coaches ==
- By Soviet Republic of birth:

(Armenian Soviet Socialist Republic) Armenian SSR:

- Armenak Alachachian
- Stepan Spandaryan

(Georgian Soviet Socialist Republic) Georgian SSR:

- Otar Korkia

(Lithuanian Soviet Socialist Republic) Lithuanian SSR:

- Vladas Garastas

(Russian Soviet Federative Socialist Republic) Russian SFSR:

- Sergei Belov
- Alexander Gomelsky
- Vladimir Kondrashin
- Vladimir Obuchov
- Yuri Selikhov
- Pavel Tsetlin
- Konstantin Travin

== The lineups and rosters of the USSR League champions ==
1923–24: Team Moscow: Belyaev, A. Kovalev, S. Pashkov, V. Strepiheev, S. Chesnokov.

1927–28: Team Moscow: S. Vorobyov, A. Gusev, M.Medvedev, N. Strokin, K. Travin.

1933–34: Team Leningrad: F. Hostilius, Krasovskii, S. Kuznetsov, M. Morozov, P. Osipov, Vn. Rodionov, G. Tishinskiy.

1934–35: Team Moscow: E. Bokunyaev, V. Gorokhov, Zimin, A. Lobanov, M. Semichastny, J. Titov, K. Travin, A. Tolkachev.

1935–36: Team Leningrad: F. Hostilius, A. Elenskiy, Kuznetsov, V. Kurkov, M. Sverckov, G. Tishinskiy.

1936–37: Dynamo Moscow: V. Gorokhov, A. Grigoriev, V. Dmitriev, Alexander Zaitsev, A. Zinin, Rumyantsev, S. Spandaryan.

1937–38: Burevestnik Leningrad: B. Abramov, V. Zhebokritsky, B. Kondrashov, A. Selivanov, Stepanov.

1938–39: Lokomotiv Moscow: En. Alekseev, Belyaev, A. Lobanov, V. Kiselev, Romishevsky, Y. Titov, K. Travin.

1939–40: Burevestnik Leningrad: B. Abramov, V. Zhebokritsky, Zlobin, V. Kondrashov, V. Razzhivin, Rogov, A. Selivanov, Stepanov.

1943–44: Armia Tbilisi: N. Jorjkia, L. Dzekonsky, Ermakov, G. Zahlyan, B. Oganezov, B. Sarkisov, M. Filippov.

1944–45: CSKA Moscow: Ev. Alekseev, En. Alekseev, Bajkov, Grebenshchikov, V. Kudryashov, S. Kuznetsov, B. Mershin.

1945–46: Armia Tbilisi: G. Akhvlediani, A. Vachadze, G. Gupalov, L. Dzekonsky, N. Jorjikia, S. Oganezov, B. Sarkisov, O. Sulaberidze, M. Filippov.

1946–47: SKIF Kaunas: S. Butautas, A. Vilimas, V. Dzenis, I. Kilšauskas, J. Lagunavičius, V. Majorovas, K. Petkevičius, V. Sercevičius, V. Kulakauskas.

1947–48: Dynamo Moscow: G. Bajkov, V. Vlasov, V. Kolpakov, A. Konev, Kogan, Y. Ozerov, Al. Saychuk, P. Sergeev, B. Fedotov, Yuri Ushakov.

1948–49: Tartu Ülikool: U. Kiivet, H. Krevald, I. Kull, V. Laats, I. Lysov, G. Rekker, H. Russak, E. Ehaveer, O.Õun, H. Kruus.

1949–50: Dinamo Tbilisi: D. Godziashvili, N. Jorjikia, V. Zhgenti, S. Tortladze, L. Intskirveli, S. Korkashvili, O. Korkia, A. Meskhi, J. Nizharadze, G. Rukhadze.

1950–51: Žalgiris Kaunas: I. Balakauskas, G. Butautas, J. Lagunavičius, A. Nemcevičius, K. Petkevičius, Z. Sabulis, V. Sercevičius, L. Tendzegolskis, V. Timleris.

1951–52: VVS Moscow: Ev. Alekseev, En. Alekseev, V. Antonov, G. Gupalov, E. Kazakov, A. Konev, A. Moiseev, D. Osipov, G. Silins, S. Tarasov.

1952–53: Dinamo Tbilisi: G.K. Abashidze, G.A. Abashidze, V. Gvantseladze, N. Jorjikia, M. Eganov, V. Zhgenti, L. Intskirveli, A. Kiladze, O. Korkia, G. Minashvili, J. Nizharadze.

1953–54: Dinamo Tbilisi: G.K. Abashidze, G.A. Abashidze, M. Asitashvili, N. Jorjikia, V. Zhgenti, L. Intskirveli, M. Kvachantiradze, A. Kiladze, O. Korkia, G. Kutchava, J. Nizharadze.

1954–55: Rīgas ASK: M. Valdmanis, T. Gavars, A. Gulbis, T. Kalhert, J. Krumins, A. Leonchik, V. Muiznieks, G. Silins, V. Skalder, O. Hecht, L. Jankowski.

1955–56: Latvian SSR Team: M. Valdmanis, I. Veritis, J. Kalnins, T. Kalhert, R. Karnitis, J. Krumins, A. Leonchik, V. Muiznieks, G. Silins, O. Hecht, L. Jankowski.

1956–57; Rīgas ASK: M. Valdmanis, I. Veritis, A. Gulbis, J. Davids, T. Kalhert, J. Krumins, A. Leonchik, V. Muiznieks, Ostrouhs J., G. Silins, O. Hecht.

1957–58: Rīgas ASK: M. Valdmanis, I. Veritis, A. Gulbis, T. Kalhert, J. Krumins, A. Leonchik, V. Muiznieks, G. Muiznieks, G. Silins, O. Hecht.

1958–59: Team Moscow: A. Alachachan, A. Astakhov, N. Balabanov, Bochkarev, G. Volnov, V. Zubkov, Korneev Yu, Y. Ozerov, Semenov, M. Studenetsky, V. Torban.

1959–60: CSKA Moscow: A. Alachachan, A. Astakhov, A. Bochkarev, Volkov, V. Zubkov, Karpov, V. Kopylov, Semenov, P. Sirotinsky, A. Travin, V. Kharitonov.

1960–61: CSKA Moscow: A. Alachachan, A. Astakhov, Bochkarev, G. Volnov, Volkov, V. Zubkov, Karpov, V. Kopylov, Semenov, P. Sirotinsky, A. Travin, B . Kharitonov.

1961–62: CSKA Moscow: A. Alachachan, A. Astakhov, Bochkarev, G. Volnov, Volkov, V. Zubkov, Karpov, V. Kovalchuk, Y. Korneev, J. Lipso, Semenov, S . Sirotinsky, A. Travin.

1962–63: Team Moscow: A. Alachachan, A. Astakhov, Bochkarev, G. Volnov, Volkov, V. Zubkov, Yu. Korneev, A. Kulkov, J. Lipso, Petrov, A. Travin, V. Hrynin, A. Shatalin.

1963–64: CSKA Moscow: A. Alachachan, A. Astakhov, A. Borodin, A. Bochkarev, G. Volnov, V. Zubkov, Yuri Korneev, A. Kulkov, J. Lipso, P. Sirotinsky, A. Travin.

1964–65: CSKA Moscow: A. Alachachan, A. Astakhov, A. Borodin, A. Bochkarev, I. Bryansk, G. Volnov, V. Zubkov, B. Kapranov, Y. Korneev, A. Kulkov, J. Lipso, A. Travin.

1965–66: CSKA Moscow: A. Alachachan, A. Astakhov, A. Borodin, A. Bochkarev, I. Bryansk, G. Volnov, V. Zubkov, B. Kapranov, A. Kovalev, Yuri Korneev, A. Kulkov, J. Lipso, V. Rodionov, A. Travin.

1966–67: Ukrainian SSR Team: V. Bryantsev, A. Valtin, B. Gladun, Novikov, V. Okipnyak, B. Pinchuk, A. Polivoda, L. Poplawski, W. Saluhin, N. Sushak, G. Chechurov.

1967–68: Dinamo Tbilisi: V. Altabaev, B. Bolqvadze, A. Kazandjian, Z. Karabak, M. Korkia, A. Lejava, Z. Leontiev, S. Magalashvili, R. Mamaladze, L. Moseshvili, V. Narimanidze, A. Skhiereli, V. Ugrekhelidze, T. Chikhladze.

1968–69: CSKA Moscow: Andreev, A. Astakhov, Belov, A. Blick, G. Volnov, V. Kapranov, N. Kovyrkin, N. Kryuchkov, A. Kulkov, J. Lipso, P. Nesterov, B. Selikhov, A. Sidyakin.

1969–70: CSKA Moscow: V. Andreev, S. Belov, A. Blick, N. Gilgner, A. Zharmukhamedov, V. Illyuk, V. Kapranov, N. Kovyrkin, N. Kryuchkov, A. Kulkov, V. Mercy, Ne. Selikhov, A. Sidyakin.

1970–71: CSKA Moscow: Andreev, Belov, N. Gilgner, I. Edeshko, A. Zharmukhamedov, V. Illyuk, V. Kapranov, Kovalenko, N. Kovyrkin, A. Kulkov, V. Mercy, C. Subbotin.

1971–72: CSKA Moscow: V. Andreev, S. Belov, I. Edeshko, A. Zharmukhamedov, V. Illyuk, V. Kapranov, Kovalenko, N. Kovyrkin, A. Kulkov, V. Miloserdov, V. Petrakov, C. Astrebov.

1972–73: CSKA Moscow: Andreev, Belov, N. Dyachenko, I. Edeshko, A. Zharmukhamedov, V. Illyuk, Kovalenko, N. Kovyrkin, A. Kulkov, V. Miloserdov, V. Petrakov, C. Astrebov.

1973–74. CSKA Moscow: V. Akimov, Belov, N. Dyachenko, I. Edeshko, A. Zharmukhamedov, V. Illyuk, Kovalenko, N. Kovyrkin, P. Lushenko, V. Miloserdov, V. Petrakov, C. Astrebov

1974–75: Spartak Leningrad: V. Arzamas, A. Belov, A. Bolshakov, L. Ivanov, S. Kuznetsov, A. Makeev, Y. Pavlov, M. Silantyev, V. Fedovrov, Yu. Shtukin, V. Yakovlev.

1975–76: CSKA Moscow: Mr. Avdeev, Belov, N. Dyachenko, I. Edeshko, S. Eremin, A. Zharmukhamedov, Kovalenko, S. Kovalenko, N. Kovyrkin, V. Miloserdov, V. Petrakov, C. Astrebov.

1976–77: CSKA Moscow: Belov, A. Gusev, I. Edeshko, S. Eremin, A. Zharmukhamedov, Kovalenko, S. Kovalenko, A. Lopatov, A. Meleshkin, V. Miloserdov, A. Mishkin, B. Petrakov.

1977–78: CSKA Moscow: V. Arzamas, Belov, A. Gusev, S. Eremin, A. Zharmukhamedov, Kovalenko, S. Kovalenko, A. Lopatov, A. Meleshkin, V. Miloserdov, A. Mishkin, B. Petrakov.

1978–79: CSKA Moscow: Belov, A. Gusev, I. Edeshko, S. Eremin, A. Zharmukhamedov, Kovalenko, S. Kovalenko, A. Lopatov, A. Meleshkin, V. Miloserdov, A. Mishkin, B. Petrakov.

1979–80: CSKA Moscow: Belov, A. Belostenny, S. Eremin, A. Zharmukhamedov, Kovalenko, S. Kovalenko, A. Lopatov, V. Miloserdov, A. Mishkin, Pankrashin, V. Petrakov, S. Tarakanov.

1980–81: CSKA Moscow: Gusev, S. Eremin, Kovalenko, S. Kovalenko, M. Kozhelyanko, V. Kuzmin, A. Lopatov, V. Miloserdov, A. Mishkin, Pankrashin, V. Petrakov, S. Tarakanov.

1981–82: CSKA Moscow: Gusev, S. Eremin, A. Kovtun, M. Kozhelyanko, V. Kuzmin, R. Kurtinaitis, A. Lopatov, A. Meleshkin, V. Miloserdov, A. Mishkin, Pankrashin, S. Tarakanov.

1982–83: CSKA Moscow: Gusev, S. Eremin, V. Kuzmin, A. Lopatov, A. Lyndin, A. Meleshkin, A. Mishkin, Pankrashin, Popov, D. Sukharev, S. Tarakanov, V. Tkachenko.

1983–84: CSKA Moscow: S. Bazarevich, A. Gusev, S. Eremin, A. Ermolinsky, A. Lopatov, A. Mishkin, Pankrashin, Popov, D. Sukharev, S. Tarakanov, V. Tkachenko, H. Enden.

1984–85: Žalgiris Kaunas: M. Arlauskas, A. Brazys, A. Visockas, S. Jovaiša, G. Krapikas, R. Kurtinaitis, M. Lekarauskas, A. Sabonis, V. Chomičius, R. Čivilis, V. Jankauskas.

1985–86: Žalgiris Kaunas: A. Brazys, A. Visockas, S. Jovaiša, G. Krapikas, R. Kurtinaitis, M. Lekarauskas, A. Sabonis, V. Chomičius, R. Čivilis, V. Jankauskas.

1986–87: Žalgiris Kaunas: A. Brazys, A. Visockas, A. Venclovas, S. Jovaiša, G. Krapikas, R. Kurtinaitis, M. Lekarauskas, A. Sabonis, V. Chomičius, R. Čivilis, V. Jankauskas.

1987–88: CSKA Moscow: V. Berezhnoj, Volkov, V. Goborov, Gorin, A. Lopatov, I. Miglinieks, Minaev, Pankrashin, S. Popov, S. Tarakanov, V. Tkachenko, H. Enden.

1988–89: Budivelnyk Kyiv: A. Belostenny, Volkov, E. Dolgov, A. Kovtun, Y. Kosenko, V. Levitsky, E. Murzin, S. Orehov, I. Pinchuk, A. Podkovyrov, Yu. Silvestrov, A. Shaptala, A. Shevchenko.

1989–90: CSKA Moscow: V. Berezhnoj, Gorin, A. Gusev, A. Kornev, S. Kocherin, A. Lopatov, A. Meleshkin, Minaev, S. Popov, G. Rezcov, S. Tarakanov, V. Tkachenko.

1990–91: Kalev Tallinn: S. Babenko, G. Jackson, A. Karavaev, G. Kullamäe, A. Kuusmaa, M. Metstak, A. Nagel, M. Noormets, R. Pehka, I. Saksakulm, T. Sokk, A. Toomiste.

1991–92 (CIS League): Spartak Saint Petersburg: V. Gorin, V. Dolopchi, V. Karasev, J. Kisurin, A. Maltsev, M. Mikhailov, V. Mishnev, S. Panov, Z. Pashutin, A. Potapov, A. Fetisov, G. Schetinin.

== Successor leagues ==
- Russian Super League 1 (1st-tier): (1992–2010)
- Russian Professional League: (2010–2013)
- VTB United League: (2008–present)

== See also ==
- Russian Professional Championship: (1991–present)
- Russian Super League 1: (1992–present)
- Russian Professional League: (2010–2013)
- Russian Cup: (1999–present)
- VTB United League: (2008–present)
- USSR Cup: (1949–1987)
- Russian basketball league system
- Basketball in Russia
