= Rīgas ASK =

- Leagues: USSR Premier League (1953–1991); LBL (1991–1997)
- Founded: 1931
- Folded: 1997
- History: Rīgas ASK (1931–1997)
- Location: Riga, Latvian SSR & Latvia
- Team colors: Yellow and Blue
- Championships: EuroLeague Championships (3); USSR Premier League Championships (3)
Home	Away

Rīgas Armijas sporta klubs (BK Rīgas ASK) was a professional basketball club that was based in Riga, Latvia.

== History ==
Rīgas ASK was founded in 1931, and started playing in the Latvian Basketball Championship. In the years that Latvia was controlled by the Soviet Union, the club was a member of the USSR Premier League, which lasted until 1991 (and to 1992 as the CIS Unified League). In 1953, head coach Alexander Gomelsky came to the club, and he remained with it until 1966.

Almost immediately, Gomelsky led ASK to the top of the USSR League, as he and the club's star player, Jānis Krūmiņš, led them to USSR League championships in 1955, 1957, and 1958, and also to the top of the European-wide top-tier level, by winning the FIBA European Champions Cup (now called EuroLeague) three times in a row, in 1958, 1959, and 1960. As well as to the final in 1961.

In 1997, Rīgas ASK merged with BK Brocēni, and the new club of BK ASK Brocēni was thus created. The new club was dissolved in 2001.

In 2004, a new club, under the name of BK Rīga was founded; and in 2006, it was renamed to ASK Rīga, after gaining the support of Riga City Council, the Latvian National Armed Forces, and some powerful sponsors.

== Honours ==
Total titles: 6

=== Domestic competitions ===
- USSR Premier League

Champions (3): 1954–55, 1956–57, 1957–58
Runners-up (2): 1961–62, 1963–64

=== European competitions ===
- EuroLeague

Champions (3): 1958, 1958–59, 1959–60
Runners-up (1): 1960–61

== Notable players ==
Note: Flags indicate national team eligibility at FIBA-sanctioned events. Players may hold other non-FIBA nationalities not displayed.

Criteria

To appear in this section a player must have either:

- Set a club record or won an individual award while at the club
- Played at least one official international match for their national team at any time
- Played at least one official NBA match at any time.

- (Latvia) Kārlis Ārens
- (Lithuanian Soviet Socialist Republic) Romanas Brazdauskis
- (Latvian Soviet Socialist Republic) Alvils Gulbis
- (Latvian Soviet Socialist Republic) Jānis Krūmiņš
- (Estonian Soviet Socialist Republic) Aivar Kuusmaa
- (Estonian Soviet Socialist Republic) Jaak Lipso
- (Latvian Soviet Socialist Republic) Valdis Muižnieks
- (Estonian Soviet Socialist Republic) Rauno Pehka
- (Latvian Soviet Socialist Republic) Maigonis Valdmanis

== Head coaches ==
- (Latvian Soviet Socialist Republic) Gunārs Baldzēns (1953)
- (Russian Soviet Federative Socialist Republic) Alexander Gomelsky (1953–1966)
- (Latvian Soviet Socialist Republic) Maigonis Valdmanis (1966–1969)
- (Latvian Soviet Socialist Republic) Gunārs Baldzēns (1969–1970)
- (Latvian Soviet Socialist Republic) Juris Kalniņš (1970–1971)
- (Latvian Soviet Socialist Republic) Jānis Zeltiņš (1971–1974 & 1987–1988)
- (Latvian Soviet Socialist Republic) Valentīns Meļņičuks (1974–1981)
- (Latvian Soviet Socialist Republic) Nikolajs Bolvačovs (1981–1986 & 1988)
- (Russian Soviet Federative Socialist Republic) Aleksandrs Gostevs (1988)
- (Latvian Soviet Socialist Republic) Armands Krauliņš (1989–1990)
- (Latvian Soviet Socialist Republic) Pēteris Višņēvics (1990–1991)
