= PBC CSKA Moscow =

Professional basketball team

CSKA Moscow
- Nickname: Армейцы (Army men); Кони (Horses); Красно-синие (Red-Blue)
- Leagues: VTB United League; EuroLeague (suspended)
- Founded: 23 April 1923; 103 years ago
- History: PBC CSKA Moscow (1923–present)
- Arena: Megasport Arena
- Capacity: 13,344
- Location: Moscow, Russia
- Team colors: Red, blue, white
- President: Andrey Vatutin
- Head coach: Andreas Pistiolis
- Team captain: Semyon Antonov
- Ownership: Norilsk Nickel
- Affiliation: CSKA Junior
- International titles: 8 EuroLeagues
- Domestic titles: 24 Soviet Championships; 29 Russian Championships; 4 Russian Cups; 3 Soviet Cups; 1 North European League; 13 VTB United Leagues; 3 VTB League Supercups
- Website: https://cskabasket.ru
Home	Away	Third

PBC CSKA Moscow (Russian: ПБК ЦСКА Москва) is a Russian professional basketball team based in Moscow, Russia. The club is a member of the VTB United League, and was a member of the EuroLeague. On February 28, 2022, EuroLeague Basketball suspended all Russian teams because of the Russian invasion of Ukraine.

CSKA won two titles between 2006 and 2008, as well as between 2016 and 2019, in Europe's principal club competition, the EuroLeague, making the final in all seasons these years, and in total has advanced to the EuroLeague Final Four 18 times in the 21st century. CSKA is dominating in VTB United League, winning all but three titles to date. With 8 EuroLeague championships, 1 NEBL championship, 53 home league championships, 7 home cups, 2 home Supercups and 12 VTB United League titles in total, CSKA is the most successful basketball team in Russia (former Soviet Union), and is also one of the most successful basketball teams in Europe.

In EuroLeague in 2006 CSKA won its first title in a long time, defeating Maccabi Tel Aviv 73–69 in the final in Prague. Next year the team lost in the 2007 final 93–91 to Panathinaikos on the Greens' home floor, the Nikos Galis Olympic Indoor Hall in Athens. In 2008, they won a rematch of the 2006 final against Maccabi Tel Aviv 91–77 in Madrid. In 2009, they lost a rematch of the 2007 final against Panathinaikos 73–71 in Berlin. The club competed in eight consecutive EuroLeague Final Fours from 2003 to 2010, which is an all-time record. Later the team beat its own record by making it to nine consecutive Final Fours from 2012 to 2021 (with 2020 Final Four cancelled due to COVID-19 situation). CSKA then won its seventh title in 2016, after beating Fenerbahçe in the final by a score of 101–96 in overtime. The last European title up-to-date was won in 2019, when CSKA defeated Anadolu Efes in the final in Vitoria-Gasteiz.

Well-known players who have played for the club over the years include: Sergei Belov, Gennadi Volnov, Viktor Zubkov, Yuri Korneev, Vladimir Andreev, Anatoly Myshkin, Stanislav Yeryomin, Ivan Edeshko, Armenak Alachachian, Alzhan Zharmukhamedov, Heino Enden, Jaak Lipso, Sergei Tarakanov, Rimas Kurtinaitis, Vladimir Tkachenko, Sergei Bazarevich, Sasha Volkov, Andrei Kirilenko, Trajan Langdon, Darius Songaila, Gordan Giriček, Dragan Tarlać, Marcus Brown, Matjaž Smodiš, Sergei Panov, Aleksey Savrasenko, Ramūnas Šiškauskas, Theo Papaloukas, Nenad Krstić, J. R. Holden, Sasha Kaun, Miloš Teodosić, Victor Khryapa, Nando de Colo, Kyle Hines, Cory Higgins, Sergio Rodriguez and Will Clyburn. Also, Alexander Gomelsky, the Naismith Memorial Basketball Hall of Fame basketball coach, worked in CSKA for more than 20 years. Nowadays, CSKA has the reputation for being one of the richest sports clubs in Europe, having been previously owned by Russian billionaire Mikhail Prokhorov, and being currently owned by Norilsk Nickel.

== History ==
=== 1923–1991 ===
CSKA was founded on 29 April 1923, then known as OPPV, when on that day soldiers and sportsmen fought in football against each other for the first place of Moscow. "OPPV", which means Опытно-показательная военно-спортивная площадка всевобуча, a department in the General military education service, was the first central sports department of the Red Army. It was based on the pre-revolutionary "Community of Amateur Skiers".

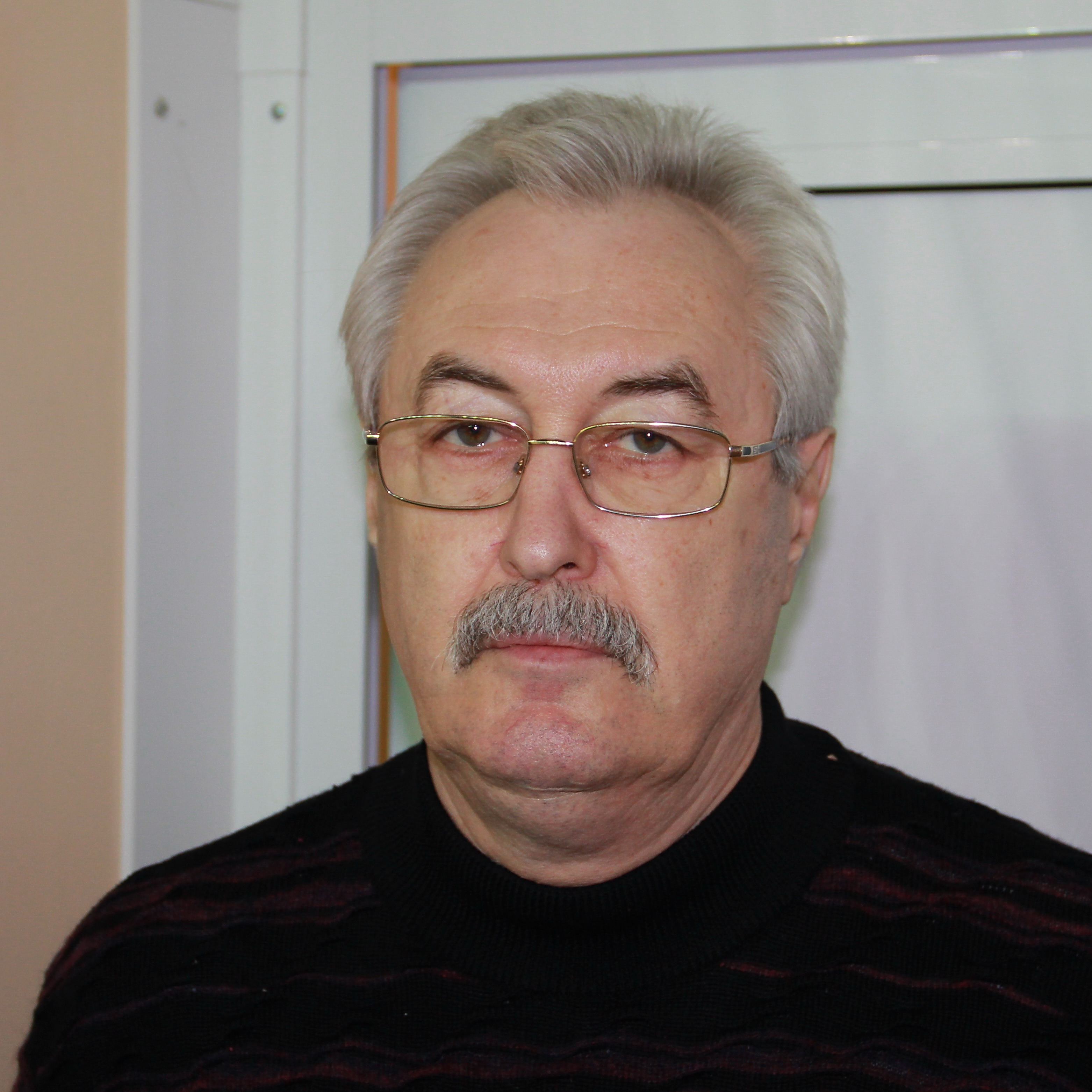
Sergei Belov, voted the best FIBA Player ever, in 1991.

The first success of the basketball department came at the 1924 Soviet League championship, which was played between cities, not clubs. Two more titles followed in 1928 and 1935. In 1938, the Soviet League championship was played between clubs, and CSKA under the name CDKA (Центральный дом Красной Армии, Central House of the Red Army) debuted there. Stalin's son, Vasily, then founded the club VVS MVO (Военно-Воздушные Силы Московского Военного Округа), with CDKA merging with it. By the end of the Great Patriotic War, CSKA established itself as one of the most respected Soviet basketball teams.

In 1953 and 1954, the club was renamed CDSA (Центральный дом Советской Армии, Central House of the Soviet Army), between 1955 and 1960, it was known as CSK MO, and finally in 1960, it received its current name CSKA (Центральный спортивный клуб Армии, Central Sports Club of the Army).

CSKA won the FIBA European Champions Cup (now called EuroLeague) title, in 1961, 1963, 1969, and 1971. They also won the Soviet League championship 24 times (1945, 1960–1962, 1964–1966, 1969–1974, 1976–1984, 1988, and 1990).

=== 1992–2008 ===
CSKA won the Russian League title every year from 1992 through 2000, and every year from 2003 to 2008. CSKA also made the 1996 EuroLeague Final Four. They also made the 2001 SuproLeague Final Four, the 2003 EuroLeague Final Four, the 2004 EuroLeague Final Four and the 2005 EuroLeague Final Four, before finally winning the EuroLeague championship at the 2006 EuroLeague Final Four.

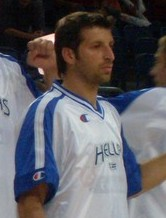
Theo Papaloukas, club star and EuroLeague Legend.

In the 2004–05 season, CSKA eventually lost in the semifinals on their home court to Spanish League club TAU Cerámica, and to Panathinaikos, of the Greek League, in the third-place game. That sent them to the 2nd grade teams in the EuroLeague draw. That same year they also lost a game in the finals series of the Russian League, but they eventually got the Russian League crown.

In 2006, CSKA qualified for the 2004–05 EuroLeague Top 16, by finishing third in their group. They finished at the top of their Top 16 group, being denied a perfect record at Tau, in their final game. CSKA entered the 2006 EuroLeague Final Four on a roll, as the only club to sweep their best-of-three quarterfinal series, by defeating Turkish Super League power Efes Pilsen. They defeated Barça in the EuroLeague semis, before defeating the high-powered offense of Maccabi Tel Aviv, of the Israeli Basketball Super League, in the final, on April 30, even though the overall record of Maccabi's games with CSKA Moscow favored the Israeli club.

The following year, they faced Panathinaikos in the final, on the Greek team's home floor, OAKA Indoor Hall, which had been designated more than a year earlier as the site for that year's Final Four. Panathinaikos won. In 2008, their EuroLeague championship win at the 2008 EuroLeague Final Four, put them in sole possession of second place for overall top-tier level European-wide titles. On October 14, 2008, the team played an NBA preseason game against the Toronto Raptors, at Air Canada Centre, in Toronto.

=== 2009–2021 ===
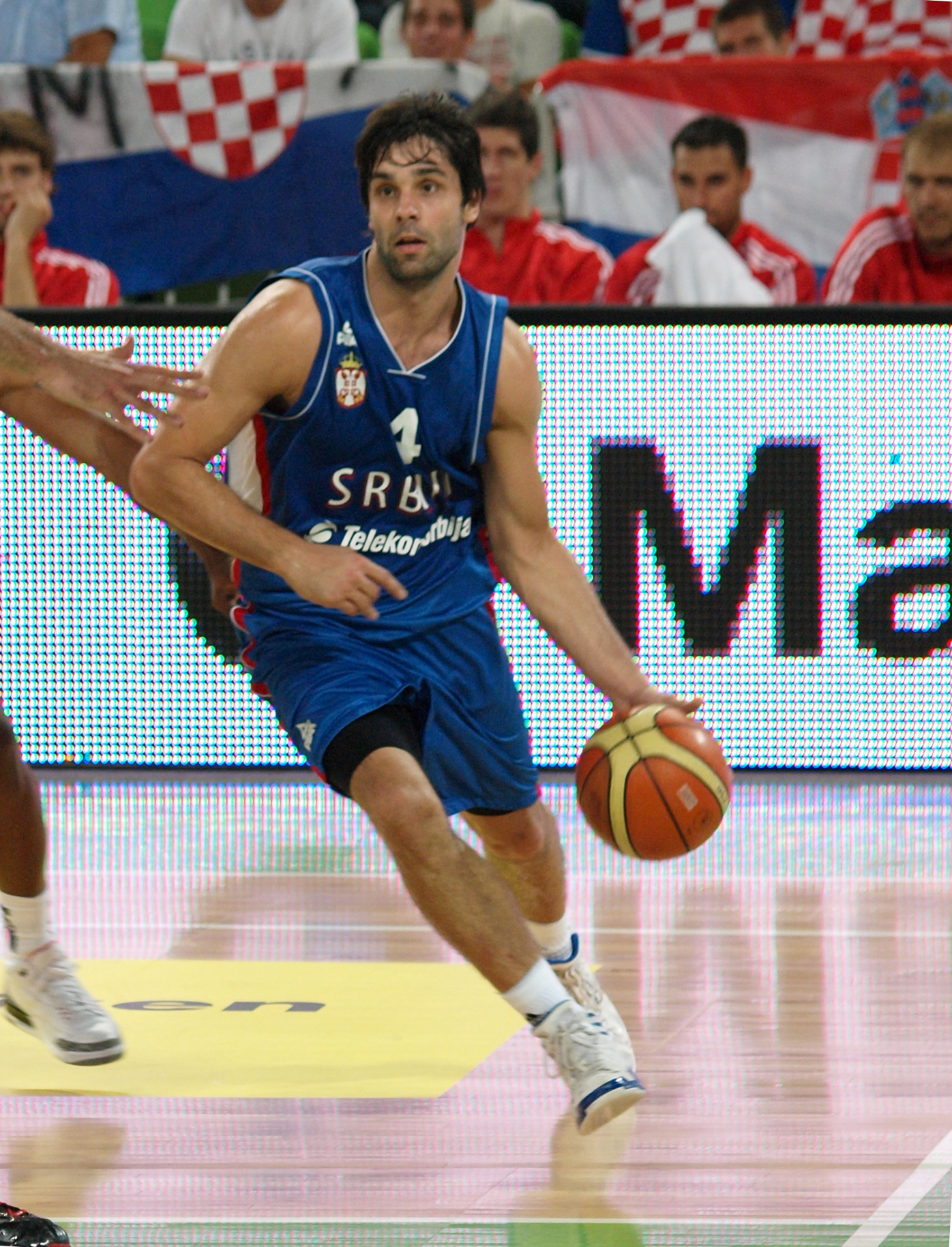
Miloš Teodosić, club star in mid-2010s

CSKA won the Russian League title every year from 2009 through 2018, continuing to add to their streak of consecutive Russian League titles won every year since 2003 overall. Since the foundation of the VTB United League in 2008, CSKA has dominated the league, winning the title in 10 of its first 11 seasons (2010, 2012–2019, 2021), excluding the league's Promotional Cup in 2008.

EuroLeague success, however, continued to elude the team. From 2009, CSKA had played in the Final Four every single year except 2011. However, CSKA suffered multiple heartbreaks. CSKA struggled, in particular playing Olympiacos, who beat CSKA in the EuroLeague finals in 2012, and eliminated CSKA in 2013 and 2015. In 2014, CSKA lost a shocker to Maccabi Tel Aviv. CSKA won 3rd place in 2010, 2013 and 2015.

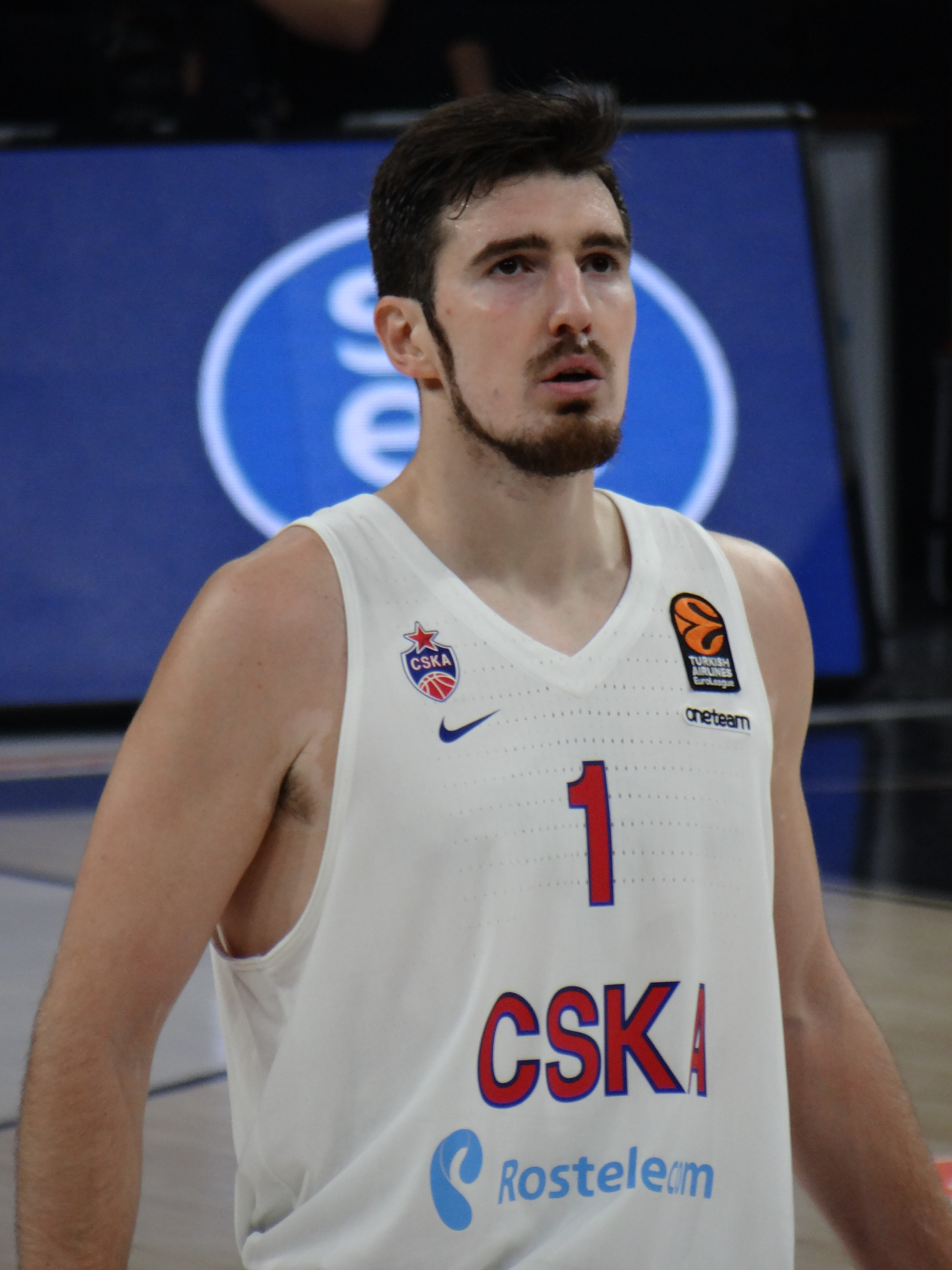
Nando de Colo, EuroLeague MVP and Final Four MVP in 2016

In the 2015–16 season, CSKA won its 7th EuroLeague championship. At the Berlin Final Four, CSKA Moscow defeated Fenerbahçe, by a score of 101–96, after overtime. The star player of CSKA was Nando de Colo, who was named both the season EuroLeague MVP, and the EuroLeague Final Four MVP. In 2016–2017, CSKA reached the Final Four again, but once again lost to Olympiacos in the semifinals. CSKA beat Real Madrid to win 3rd place.

In 2017-18 season CSKA finished with a 24–6 record. Qualifying to the Final Four, however, CSKA suffered a complete fiasco - losing to Real Madrid in the semifinals, and to BC Žalgiris in the 3rd place game. In the VTB United League, CSKA secured their 9th title after defeating Khimki 95:84 in the 2018 Final Four.

In the next season CSKA finished at the 2nd place of the regular season, securing its 17th Final Four appearance in the 21 century. In Vitoria-Gasteiz the club made a comeback during the semifinals against Real Madrid and beat Anadolu Efes in the final, achieving 8th title in club's history. CSKA also won the VTB United League, sweeping Khimki 3:0 in the finals.

There were changes in the 2019–20 season. Defending champion CSKA Moscow played steady until November, when they suffered four losses in a row, stepping down to the 6th position at worst. Due to the COVID-19 pandemic, CSKA and all other teams quit playing after the 28th round; there was no winner declared. At the time of the season's stopping, CSKA was behind Khimki in the VTB standings. The tournament was also stopped with no winner being announced.

In the 2020-2021 season, CSKA again lead in the EuroLeague standings for much of the season, before repeated conflicts by Itoudis, CSKA management, and Mike James resulted in James, team leader, leaving the team in March. While losing the first place in the standings to FC Barcelona, CSKA went all the way to the EuroLeague Final Four. CSKA, however, lost to Efes in the semifinals, and were beaten by EA7 Emporio Armani Milan in the third place game, thus finishing the season in disappointing 4th place. In the VTB United League, despite finishing the regular season in just 4th place, CSKA beat Nizhny Novgorod 2-1 in the quarterfinals, regular season winners Zenit Saint Petersburg 3-1 in the semifinals, and UNICS Kazan 3-0 in the finals to win the VTB United League once again.

=== 2022–present ===
In early 2022, upon the outbreak of the 2022 Russian invasion of Ukraine, Tornike Shengelia from Georgia left the club (saying: "Everyone says it was a difficult or big decision, but it was not. First of all, I felt that my family was threatened, even though the war was not in Moscow. With war you never know what will occur, one second is enough for something to happen. The first thing I wanted to do was to send my family away and then I made the decision to depart too."), Johannes Voigtmann from Germany ("I can't reconcile myself playing for a Russian team.... The Russian president is responsible for a brutal war, because of which innocent people are dying in Ukraine. Millions of people have to flee their homes, and children, in particular, are losing their homes or even their lives. I just couldn't stay in Russia and carry on as if nothing had happened...."), Gabriel Lundberg from Denmark, Marius Grigonis from Lithuania, Italian-American Daniel Hackett, and Russian-American Joel Bolomboy all left the team. Canadian-Slovenian Kevin Pangos who signed with CSKA one day before the war started never joined the team. The team informed them all that the departure means violating of their contracts and reached the agreements on terminating the contracts with all but one player, Joel Bolomboy, who was given a letter of clearance by FIBA to sign for Olympiacos Piraeus when his CSKA contract expired in summer of 2022. CSKA informed about the intention to sue Bolomboy for breaching his CSKA agreement earlier.

On February 28, 2022, EuroLeague Basketball suspended the team because of Russia's invasion of Ukraine. On March 22, 2022, CSKA, UNICS Kazan, and Zenit St. Petersburg were disqualified from the EuroLeague. In October 2022, CSKA Moscow president Andrey Vatutin said: "Owners and sponsors are in crisis and are not interested in spending big money just to participate in the VTB league – therefore the budget is reduced. We have left the international scene, so CSKA's role in world basketball is declining."

In the VTB United League, CSKA made the finals once again. Despite leading 3-1 in the finals, CSKA lost the last three games to Zenit St. Petersburg, who won the VTB title with a 4-3 series win - for the first time since 2010-2011, CSKA did not win the competition. Greek head coach Dimitrios Itoudis left the team in June 2022, immediately after losing the final game to Zenit, with one year remaining on his contract.

== Home arenas ==
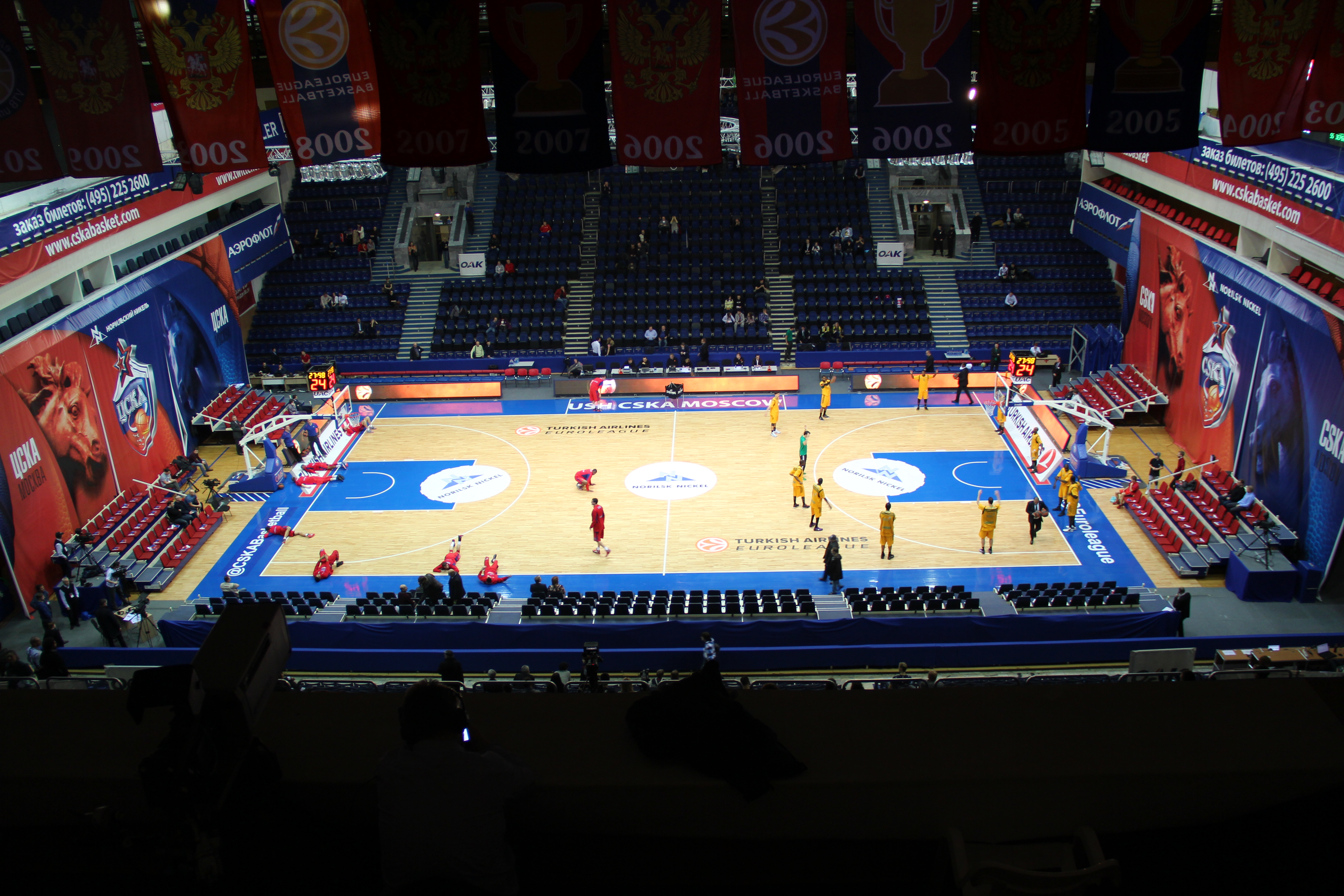
Interior of the 5,500 seat Universal Sports Hall CSKA.

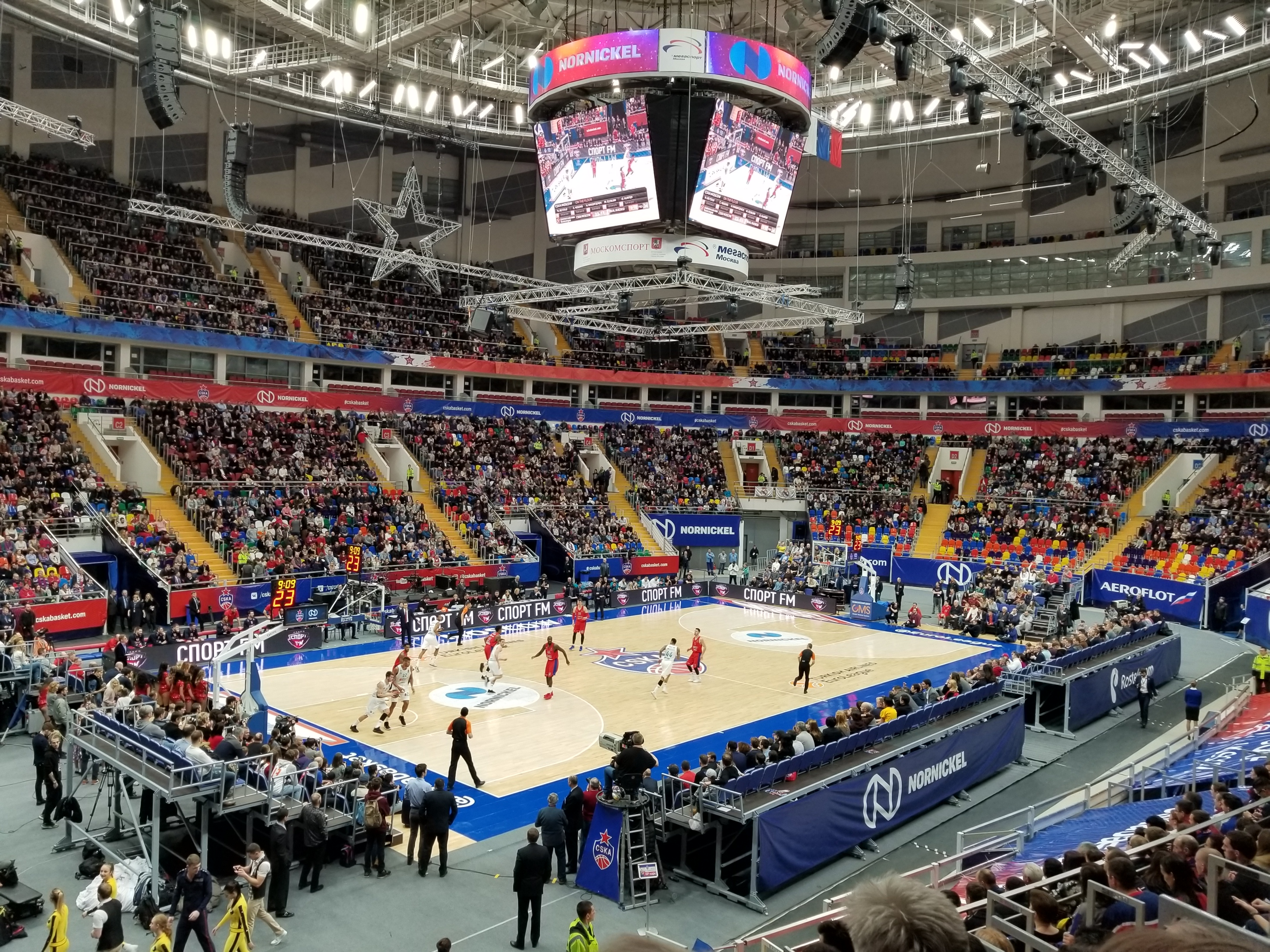
Interior of the 13,344 seat Megasport Arena.

CSKA played all of its home games, both national domestic league games, and European league games, at the 5,500 seat Universal Sports Hall CSKA, from 1979 to 2015. They also played a home EuroLeague game at the 13,344 seat Megasport Arena, on January 23, 2008. Starting with the 2015–16 season, CSKA began regularly playing its home EuroLeague games at Megasport Arena, while still playing at CSKA Universal Sports Hall for VTB United League games. Kaliningrad's Yantarny Sports Palace was used as a substitute for their round of 16 and 17 home games during the 2019-20 EuroLeague season.

== Players ==
=== Current roster ===
Note: Flags indicate national team eligibility at FIBA-sanctioned events. Players may hold other non-FIBA nationalities not displayed.

CSKA Moscow roster
Players
Coaches

Pos.	No.	Nat.	Name	Ht.	Wt.	Age
SG	1	(United States)	Cleveland, Antonius	1.96 m (6 ft 5 in)	90 kg (198 lb)	31 – 20 November 1994
PG	2	(United States)	Ware, Casper	1.78 m (5 ft 10 in)	79 kg (174 lb)	36 – 2 February 1990
PG	3	(Russia)	Karpenko, Vladimir	1.92 m (6 ft 4 in)	80 kg (176 lb)	26 – 7 September 2000
SF	4	(Russia)	Ruzhentsev, Samson	2.02 m (6 ft 8 in)	95 kg (209 lb)	24 – 23 October 2001
C	5	(Russia)	Gankevich, Aleksandr	2.01 m (6 ft 7 in)	101 kg (223 lb)	31 – 5 August 1995
PG	6	(United States)	Trimble, Melo	1.88 m (6 ft 2 in)	86 kg (190 lb)	31 – 2 February 1995
SG	7	(Russia)	Ukhov, Ivan	1.93 m (6 ft 4 in)	89 kg (196 lb)	31 – 11 September 1995
SF	8	(Russia)	Astapkovich, Anton	2.02 m (6 ft 8 in)	104 kg (229 lb)	32 – 29 January 1994
PF	10	(Russia)	Chadov, Aleksandr	2.04 m (6 ft 8 in)	109 kg (240 lb)	25 – 15 February 2001
PF	11	(Russia)	Antonov, Semyon (C)	2.02 m (6 ft 8 in)	104 kg (229 lb)	37 – 18 July 1989
C	12	(Russia)	Elatontsev, Kirill	2.10 m (6 ft 11 in)	104 kg (229 lb)	24 – 5 July 2002
C	17	(France)	Jean-Charles, Livio	2.06 m (6 ft 9 in)	104 kg (229 lb)	32 – 8 November 1993
PF	24	(France)	M'Baye, Amath	2.06 m (6 ft 9 in)	102 kg (225 lb)	36 – 14 December 1989
SF	41	(Russia)	Kurbanov, Nikita	2.02 m (6 ft 8 in)	105 kg (231 lb)	39 – 12 October 1986

Head coach

- (Greece) Andreas Pistiolis

Assistant coach(es)

- (Russia) Denis Godlevskiy
- (Greece) Ioannis Gapkiadis

Legend

- (C) Team captain
- Injured

- Roster
Updated: October 6, 2026

=== Depth chart ===
Pos.	Starting 5	Bench 1	Bench 2	Bench 3
C	Livio Jean-Charles	Aleksandr Gankevich		Kirill Elatontsev
PF	Amath M'Baye	Semyon Antonov		Aleksandr Chadov
SF	Nikita Kurbanov	Anton Astapkovich	Samson Ruzhentsev
SG	Antonius Cleveland	Ivan Ukhov
PG	Casper Ware	Melo Trimble	Vladimir Karpenko

== Honours and other achievements ==
Honours
Type	Competition	Titles	Seasons
International	EuroLeague	8	1960–61, 1962–63, 1968–69, 1970–71, 2005–06, 2007–08, 2015–16, 2018–19
Domestic	Soviet League	24	1944–45, 1959–60, 1960–61, 1961–62, 1963–64, 1964–65, 1965–66, 1968–69, 1969–70, 1970–71, 1971–72, 1972–73, 1973–74, 1975–76, 1976–77, 1977–78, 1978–79, 1979–80, 1980–81, 1981–82, 1982–83, 1983–84, 1987–88, 1989–90
Domestic	Russian League	29	1991–92, 1992–93, 1993–94, 1994–95, 1995–96, 1996–97, 1997–98, 1998–99, 1999–00, 2002–03, 2003–04, 2004–05, 2005–06, 2006–07, 2007–08, 2008–09, 2009–10, 2010–11, 2011–12, 2012–13, 2013–14, 2014–15, 2015–16, 2016–17, 2017–18, 2018–19, 2020–21, 2023–24, 2024–25
Domestic	Russian Cup	4	2004–05, 2005–06, 2006–07, 2009–10
Domestic	Soviet Cup	3	1971–72, 1972–73, 1981–82
Domestic	VTB United League	13	2009–10, 2011–12, 2012–13, 2013–14, 2014–15, 2015–16, 2016–17, 2017–18, 2018–19, 2020–21, 2023–24, 2024–25, 2025–26
Domestic	VTB United League Supercup	3	2021, 2024, 2025

- Record title holders

=== Other Achievements ===
==== Trebles ====
- Triple Crown
  - Season (1): 2005–06

==== International competitions ====
- EuroLeague
  - Runners-up (6): 1964–65, 1969–70, 1972–73, 2006–07, 2008–09, 2011–12
  - Semifinalists (1): 1961–62
  - 3rd place (8): 1965–66, 1976–77, 1995–96, 2003–04, 2009–10, 2012–13, 2014–15, 2016–17
  - 4th place (8): 1982–83, 1984–85, 2000–01, 2002–03, 2004–05, 2013–14, 2017–18, 2020–21
  - Final Four (20): 1966, 1996, 2001, 2003, 2004, 2005, 2006, 2007, 2008, 2009, 2010, 2012, 2013, 2014, 2015, 2016, 2017, 2018, 2019, 2021
- FIBA Saporta Cup (defunct)

Semifinalists (2): 1985–86, 1986–87

- FIBA Korać Cup (defunct)

Semifinalists (1): 1989–90

- European Super Cup (semi-official, defunct)

3rd place (1): 1988

==== Domestic competitions ====
- USSR Premier League (defunct)
  - Runners-up (11): 1945–46, 1950–51, 1952–53, 1953–54, 1954–55, 1956–57, 1957–58, 1974–75, 1984–85, 1985–86, 1986–87
- Russian League
  - Runners-up (1): 2021–22
- VTB United League
  - Runners-up (2): 2010–11, 2021–22
- Russian Cup
  - Runners-up (3): 2002–03, 2003–04, 2007–08
- VTB United League Supercup
  - Runners-up (1): 2022

==== Other competitions ====
- FIBA International Christmas Tournament (friendly, defunct)

Winners (1): 1998

- VTB United League Promo-Cup

Winners (1): 2008

- Gomelsky Cup

Winners (10): 2010, 2011, 2012, 2013, 2014, 2015, 2016, 2018, 2019, 2020
Runners-up (2): 2009, 2017

- Moscow tournament

Winners (1): 2006

- Cologne tournament

Runners-up (1): 2006

- Gloria Cup

Winners (2): 2014, 2019
Runners-up (1): 2018

- Zadar Basketball Tournament

Runners-up (2): 2017, 2018

- Vladimir Kondrashin and Alexander Belov Tournament

Winners (6): 2003, 2004, 2005, 2006, 2008, 2010
Runners-up (2): 2021, 2022

- Nikos Galis Cup

Runners-up (1): 2014

- Venice, Italy Invitational Game

Winners (1): 2008

- Verona, Italy Invitational Game

Winners (1): 2008

- Rossiiskie Zheleznye Dorogi Cup

Winners (1): 2011

- Trofeo Città di Caserta

Winners (1): 2011

- Moderna, Italy Invitational Game

Winners (1): 2012

- Siena, Italy Invitational Game

Winners (1): 2013

- Bologna, Italy Invitational Game

Winners (1): 2013

- Patras, Greece Invitational Game

Winners (1): 2014

- Moscow, Russia Invitational Game

Winners (5): 2015, 2017, 2018, 2019, 2020

- Çankaya, Turkey Invitational Game

Winners (1): 2015

- Konya, Turkey Invitational Game

Winners (1): 2015

- Thessaloniki, Greece Invitational Game

Winners (1): 2016

- Shenzhen, China Invitational Game

Winners (1): 2016

- Belek, Turkey Invitational Game

Winners (1): 2019

- Neva Cup

Winners (1): 2020

- Neofytos Chandriotis

Winners (1): 2021

- Winline Basket Cup

Winners (1): 2026

=== Regional competitions ===
- North European League (defunct)

Winners (1): 1999–00

=== Individual club awards ===
- Double

Winners (7): 1971–72, 1972–73, 1981–82, 2004–05, 2005–06, 2006–07, 2009–10

- Triple Crown

Winners (1): 2005–06

== Season by season ==
Season	Tier	League	Pos.	Postseason	Cup Competitions USSR / Russia	European Competitions USSR / Russia	
CDKA
1937–38	1	Premier	12	12th place			
1938–39	1	Premier	9	9th place			
1939–40	1	Premier	13	13th place			
1944–45	1	Premier	1	Champion			
1945–46	1	Premier	2	Runner-up			
1946–47	1	Premier	3	3rd place			
1947–48	1	Premier	7	7th place			
1948–49	1	Premier	3	3rd place			
VVS MVO
1949–50	1	Premier	3	3rd place			
1950–51	1	Premier	2	Runner-up			
1951–52	1	Premier					
1952–53	1	Premier	2	Runner-up			
CDSA
1953–54	1	Premier	2	Runner-up			
1954–55	1	Premier	2	Runner-up			
CSK MO
1955–56	1	Premier					
1956–57	1	Premier	2	Runner-up			
1957–58	1	Premier	2	Runner-up			
1958–59	1	Premier					
1959–60	1	Premier	1	Champion			
CSKA Moscow
1960–61	1	Premier	1	Champion		1 Champions Cup	C
1961–62	1	Premier	1	Champion		1 Champions Cup	SF
1962–63	1	Premier				1 Champions Cup	C
1963–64	1	Premier	1	Champion		Withdrew	
1964–65	1	Premier	1	Champion		1 Champions Cup	RU
1965–66	1	Premier	1	Champion		1 Champions Cup	3rd
1966–67	1	Premier					
1967–68	1	Premier	3	3rd place			
1968–69	1	Premier	1	Champion		1 Champions Cup	C
1969–70	1	Premier	1	Champion		1 Champions Cup	RU
1970–71	1	Premier	1	Champion		1 Champions Cup	C
1971–72	1	Premier	1	Champion	Champion		
1972–73	1	Premier	1	Champion	Champion	1 Champions Cup	RU
1973–74	1	Premier	1	Champion			
1974–75	1	Premier	2	Runner-up			
1975–76	1	Premier	1	Champion			
1976–77	1	Premier	1	Champion		1 Champions Cup	SF
1977–78	1	Premier	1	Champion			
1978–79	1	Premier	1	Champion			
1979–80	1	Premier	1	Champion			
1980–81	1	Premier	1	Champion		1 Champions Cup	SF
1981–82	1	Premier	1	Champion	Champion	1 Champions Cup	EF
1982–83	1	Premier	1	Champion		1 Champions Cup	SF
1983–84	1	Premier	1	Champion			
1984–85	1	Premier	2	Runner-up		1 Champions Cup	SF
1985–86	1	Premier	2	Runner-up		2 Cup Winners' Cup	SF
1986–87	1	Premier	2	Runner-up		2 Cup Winners' Cup	SF
1987–88	1	Premier	1	Champion			
1988–89	1	Premier	3	3rd place		1 Champions Cup	EF
1989–90	1	Premier	1	Champion		3 Korać Cup	SF
1990–91	1	Premier	4	Semifinalist		1 Champions Cup	T16
1991–92	1	Premier	1	Champion			
1992–93	1	Superliga A	1	Champion		2 European Cup	QF
1993–94	1	Superliga A	1	Champion		1 European League	GS
1994–95	1	Superliga A	1	Champion		1 European League	EF
1995–96	1	Superliga A	1	Champion		1 European League	3rd
1996–97	1	Superliga A	1	Champion		1 EuroLeague	GS
1997–98	1	Superliga A	1	Champion		1 EuroLeague	EF
1998–99	1	Superliga A	1	Champion		1 EuroLeague	T16
1999–00	1	Superliga A	1	Champion		1 EuroLeague	T16
2000–01	1	Superliga A	4	4th place		1 SuproLeague	SF
2001–02	1	Superliga A	4	5th place		1 Euroleague	EF
2002–03	1	Superliga A	1	Champion	Runner-up	1 Euroleague	SF
2003–04	1	Superliga A	1	Champion	Runner-up	1 Euroleague	3rd
2004–05	1	Superliga A	1	Champion	Champion	1 Euroleague	SF
2005–06	1	Superliga A	1	Champion	Champion	1 Euroleague	C
2006–07	1	Superliga A	1	Champion	Champion	1 Euroleague	RU
2007–08	1	Superliga A	1	Champion	Runner-up	1 Euroleague	C
2008–09	1	Superliga A	1	Champion	3rd place	1 Euroleague	RU
2009–10	1	Superliga A	1	Champion	Champion	1 Euroleague	3rd
2010–11	1	PBL	2	Champion		1 Euroleague	GS
2011–12	1	PBL	1	Champion		1 Euroleague	RU
2012–13	1	PBL	2	Champion		1 Euroleague	3rd
2013–14	1	United League	2	Champion	Quarterfinalist	1 Euroleague	SF
2014–15	1	United League	1	Champion	First round	1 Euroleague	3rd
2015–16	1	United League	1	Champion	First round	1 Euroleague	C
2016–17	1	United League	1	Champion	Eighthfinals	1 EuroLeague	3rd
2017–18	1	United League	1	Champion	First round	1 EuroLeague	SF
2018–19	1	United League	1	Champion	Eighthfinals	1 EuroLeague	C
2019–20	1	United League	–	–	Eighthfinals	1 EuroLeague	CX
2020–21	1	United League	4	Champion		1 EuroLeague	SF
2021–22	1	United League	1	Runner-up	Supercup Winner	1 EuroLeague	SP
2022–23	1	United League	1	3rd Place	Supercup Runner Up	Suspended	
2023–24	1	United League	3	Champion	Supercup 6th place	Suspended	
2024–25	1	United League	2	Champion	Supercup Winner	Suspended	
2025–26	1	United League	1	Champion	Supercup Winner	Suspended	
Season	Tier	League	Pos.	Postseason	Cup Competitions USSR / Russia	European Competitions USSR / Russia	

== Notable players ==
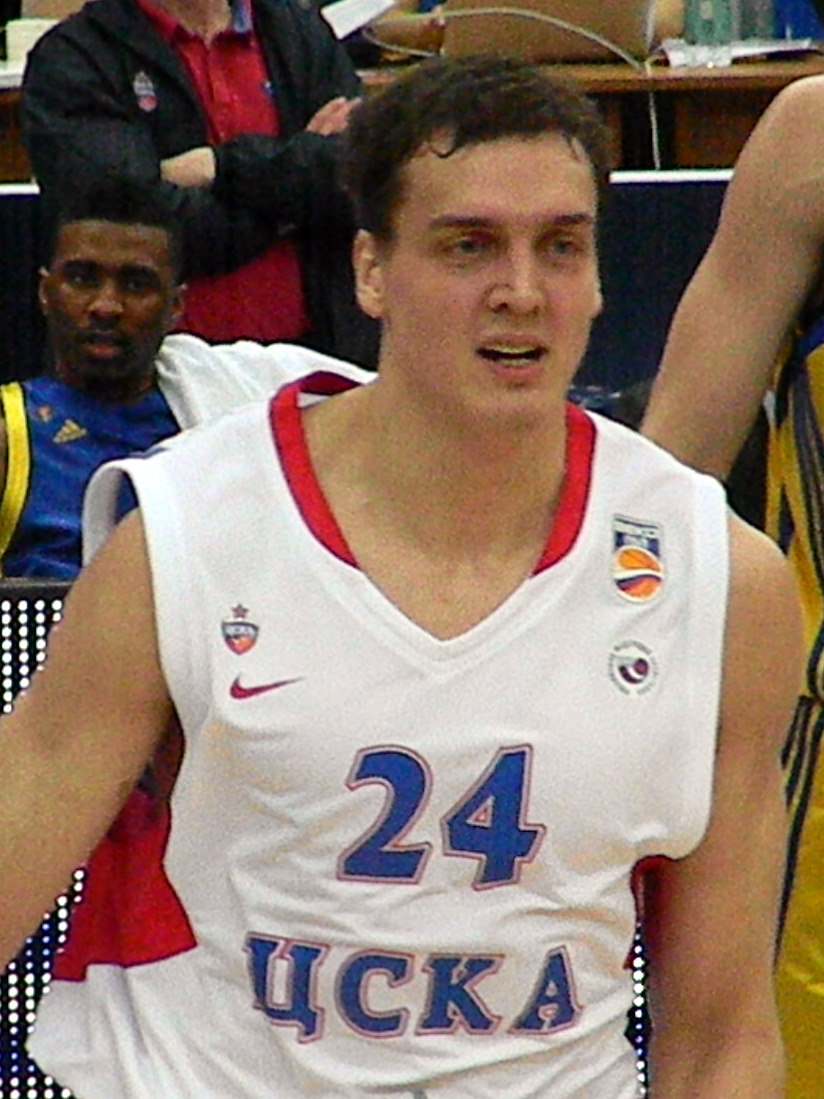
Sasha Kaun

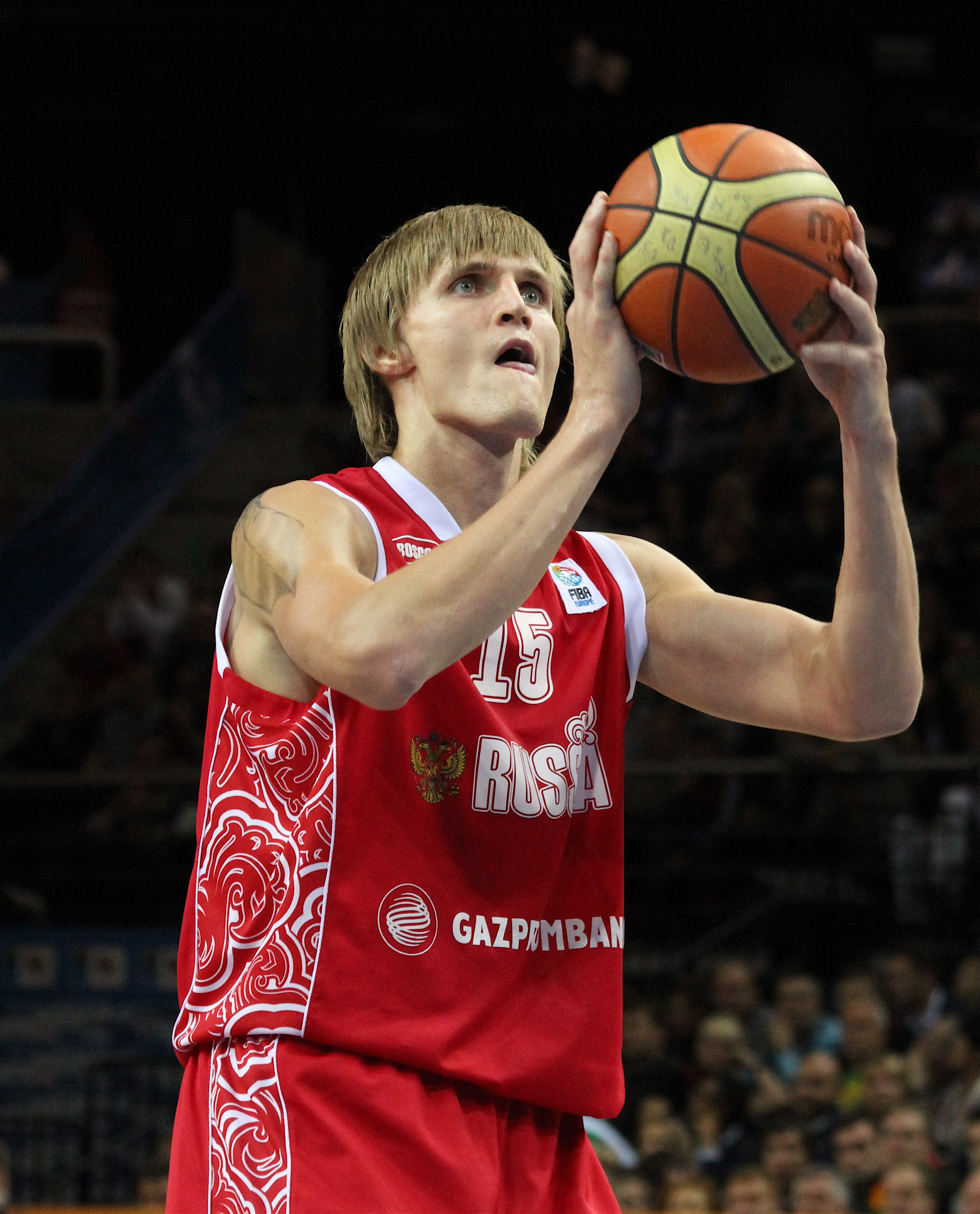
Andrei Kirilenko

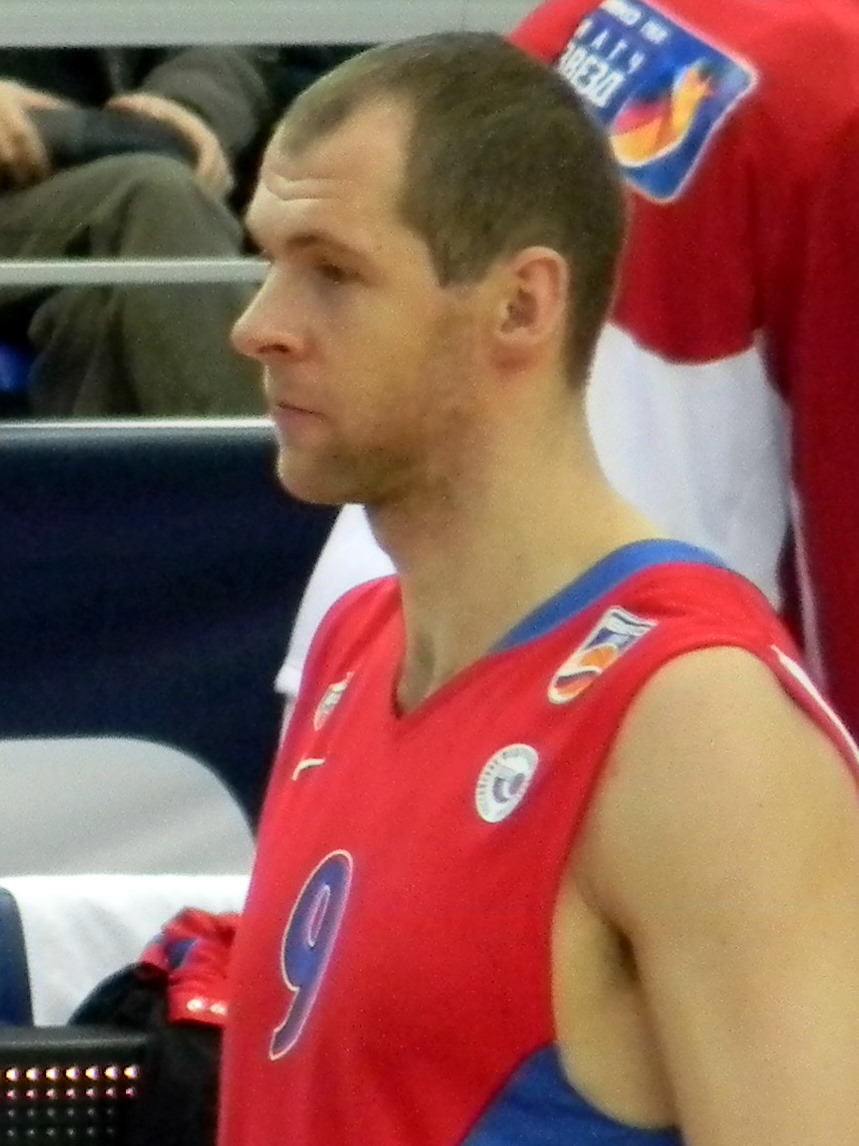
Ramūnas Šiškauskas

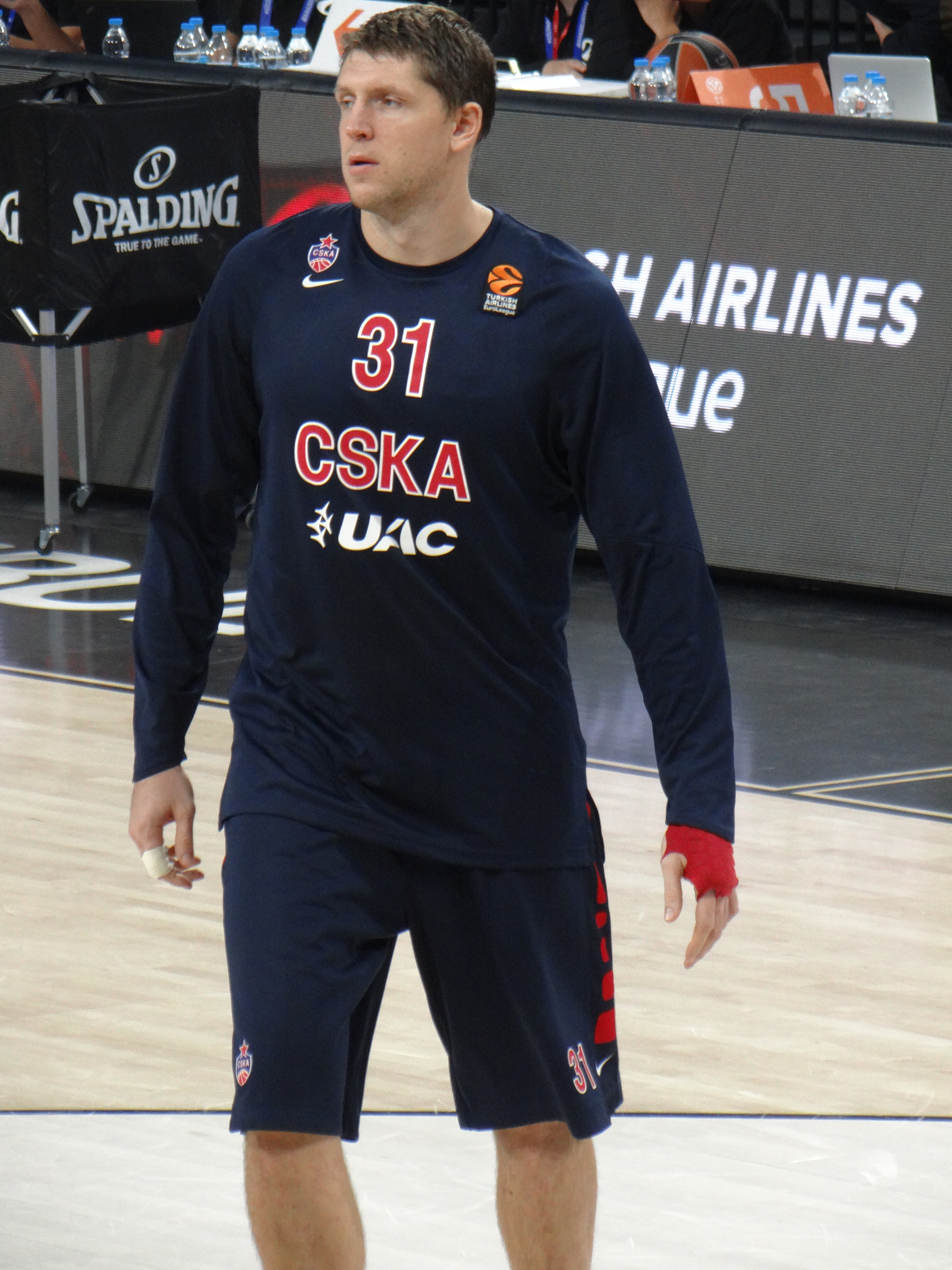
Victor Khryapa

Note: Flags indicate national team eligibility at FIBA-sanctioned events. Players may hold other non-FIBA nationalities not displayed.

Criteria

To appear in this section a player must have either:

- Set a club record or won an individual award while at the club
- Played at least one official international match for their national team at any time
- Played at least one official NBA match at any time.

Albania

- (Albania) (United States) Dallas Moore

Armenia

- (Armenia) Armenak Alachachian

Argentina

- (Argentina) (Poland) Rubén Wolkowyski

Australia

- (Australia) (Denmark) David Andersen

Belarus

- (Belarus) Ivan Edeshko

Belgium

- (Belgium) Tomas Van Den Spiegel

Bosnia and Herzegovina

- (Bosnia and Herzegovina) (United States) Alec Peters

Canada

- (Canada) (Slovenia) Kevin Pangos

Croatia

- (Croatia) Vladan Alanović
- (Croatia) Gordan Giriček
- (Croatia) Zoran Planinić
- (Croatia) Josko Poljak
- (Croatia) Mate Skelin

Cuba

- (Cuba) Howard Sant-Roos

Denmark

- (Denmark) (Nigeria) Gabriel Lundberg

Estonia

- (Estonia) Jaak Lipso
- (Estonia) Heino Enden
- (Estonia) Martin Müürsepp
- (Estonia) Tiit Sokk

France

- (France) (Portugal) Nando de Colo
- (France) Léo Westermann
- (France) Livio Jean-Charles
- (France) Amath M'Baye

Germany

- (Germany) Johannes Voigtmann

Georgia

- (Georgia (country)) Manuchar Markoishvili
- (Georgia (country)) Tornike Shengelia

Great Britain

- (United Kingdom) (Ghana) Pops Mensah-Bonsu
- (United Kingdom) Joel Freeland

Greece

- (Greece) Dimos Dikoudis
- (Greece) Nikos Chatzivrettas
- (Greece) (United States) Kosta Koufos
- (Greece) Theo Papaloukas
- (Greece) Nikos Zisis

Italy

- (Italy) (United States) Daniel Hackett

Kazakhstan

- (Kazakhstan) Alzhan Zharmukhamedov

Latvia

- (Latvia) Juris Umbraško
- (Latvia) Raimonds Miglinieks
- (Latvia) Gundars Vētra
- (Latvia) Jānis Strēlnieks

Lithuania

- (Lithuania) Gintaras Einikis
- (Lithuania) Marius Grigonis
- (Lithuania) Rimas Kurtinaitis
- (Lithuania) (Poland) Darjuš Lavrinovič
- (Lithuania) Ramūnas Šiškauskas
- (Lithuania) Darius Songaila

Nigeria

- (Nigeria) Michael Eric
- (Nigeria) Julius Nwosu
- (Nigeria) Tonye Jekiri

Russia

- (Russia) Evgeny Alekseev
- (Russia) Vladimir Andreev
- (Russia) Sergei Bazarevich
- (Russia) Sergei Belov
- (Russia) Yuri Korneev
- (Russia) Valery Miloserdov
- (Russia) Anatoly Myshkin
- (Russia) Viktor Pankrashkin
- (Russia) Sergei Tarakanov
- (Russia) (Uzbekistan) Valeri Tikhonenko
- (Russia) (Ukraine) Vladimir Tkachenko
- (Russia) Gennadi Volnov
- (Russia) Stanislav Yeryomin
- (Russia) Viktor Zubkov
- (Russia) Ruslan Avleev
- (Russia) Aleksandr Bashminov
- (Russia) Dmitri Domani
- (Russia) Vitaly Fridzon
- (Russia) Vasily Karasev
- (Russia) Sasha Kaun
- (Russia) Victor Khryapa
- (Russia) (United States) Andrei Kirilenko
- (Russia) Evgeni Kisurin
- (Russia) Igor Kudelin
- (Russia) Nikita Kurbanov
- (Russia) Sergei Monia
- (Russia) Nikita Morgunov
- (Russia) Sergei Panov
- (Russia) Zakhar Pashutin
- (Russia) Anton Ponkrashov
- (Russia) (Greece) Alexey Savrasenko
- (Russia) Alexey Shved
- (Russia) Dmitri Sokolov
- (Russia) Vitaly Nosov
- (Russia) Victor Keyru
- (Russia) Andrey Vorontsevich
- (Russia) Aleksei Zozulin

Serbia

- (Serbia) Zoran Erceg
- (Serbia) Boban Marjanović
- (Serbia) Nenad Krstić
- (Serbia) Ivan Radenović
- (Serbia) (Greece) Dragan Tarlać
- (Serbia) Vladimir Micov
- (Serbia) Miloš Teodosić
- (Serbia) Nikola Milutinov

Slovenia

- (Slovenia) Erazem Lorbek
- (Slovenia) Matjaž Smodiš

Spain

- (Spain) Sergio Rodríguez

Sweden

- (Sweden) Jonas Jerebko

Turkey

- (Turkey) Mirsad Türkcan

Ukraine

- (Ukraine) (Russia) (United States) Joel Bolomboy
- (Ukraine) Viacheslav Kravtsov
- (Ukraine) Alexander Belostenny
- (Ukraine) Sergei Kovalenko
- (Ukraine) Anatolij Kovtun
- (Ukraine) Sasha Volkov

United States

- (United States) Victor Alexander
- (United States) James Augustine
- (United States) Ron Baker
- (United States) Marcus Brown
- (United States) Dionte Christmas
- (United States) Will Clyburn
- (United States) Patrick Eddie
- (United States) Chuck Evans
- (United States) Kenneth Faried
- (United States) Allerik Freeman
- (United States) Jamont Gordon
- (United States) Marcus Goree
- (United States) Antonio Granger
- (United States) Cory Higgins
- (United States) Darrun Hilliard
- (United States) Kyle Hines
- (United States) (Russia) J. R. Holden
- (United States) (Liberia) Othello Hunter
- (United States) Aaron Jackson
- (United States) Mike James
- (United States) Trajan Langdon
- (United States) Rusty LaRue
- (United States) Curtis McCants
- (United States) (Dominican Republic) Sammy Mejia
- (United States) Terence Morris
- (United States) Drew Nicholas
- (United States) Demetris Nichols
- (United States) Jeremy Pargo
- (United States) Roy Rogers
- (United States) Victor Rudd
- (United States) Melo Trimble
- (United States) Casper Ware
- (United States) Marcus Webb
- (United States) Sonny Weems
- (United States) David Vanterpool

Venezuela

- (Venezuela) Óscar Torres

== Team captains ==
Team Captain	Years As Team Captain
(Soviet Union) Evgeny Alekseev	1944–1953
(Soviet Union) Arkady Bochkaryov	1954–1960
(Soviet Union) Armenak Alachachian	1960–1966
(Soviet Union) Gennadi Volnov	1966–1970
(Soviet Union) Sergei Belov	1970–1980
(Soviet Union) Stanislav Yeryomin	1980–1985
(Soviet Union) Sergei Tarakanov	1985–1990
(Soviet Union) Viktor Berezhniy	1990–1991
(Russia) Aleksandr Gusev	1991–1992
(Russia) Maksim Astanin	1992–1994
(Russia) Andrei Kornev	1994–1997
(Russia) Valeri Tikhonenko	1997–2000
(Russia) Igor Kudelin	2000–2001
(Russia) Dmitri Domani	2001–2002
(Russia) Evgeniy Pashutin	2002–2003
(Russia) Sergei Panov	2003–2006
(Russia) Zakhar Pashutin	2006–2008
(Slovenia) Matjaž Smodiš	2008–2009
(Russia) Victor Khryapa	2009–2018
(United States) Kyle Hines	2018–2020
(Russia) Nikita Kurbanov	2020–2023
(Russia) Semyon Antonov	2023–present

== CSKA Moscow Basketball Club Hall of Fame ==
Player	Jersey Number	Date Honored
(Soviet Union) Vadim Kapranov	#8
(Soviet Union) Yuri Korneev	#11
(Soviet Union) Evgeniy Kovalenko	#14
(Soviet Union) Aleksandr Kulkov	#4
(Soviet Union) Andrey Lopatov	#8
(Soviet Union) Valery Miloserdov	#6
(Soviet Union) Yuri Selikhov	#6
(Soviet Union) Vladimir Tkachenko	#11
(Soviet Union) Aleksandr Travin	#9
(Soviet Union) Viktor Zubkov	#7
(Soviet Union) Gennadi Volnov	#13	26 November 2011
(Soviet Union) Sergei Belov	#10	11 August 2012
(Soviet Union) Ivan Edeshko	#9	11 August 2012
(Soviet Union) Alzhan Zharmukhamedov	#7	11 August 2012
(Soviet Union) Armenak Alachachian	#6	28 March 2013
(Soviet Union) Vladimir Andreev	#15	28 March 2013
(Soviet Union) Anatoly Astakhov	#5	28 March 2013
(Soviet Union) Arkady Bochkaryov	#8	15 November 2013
(Soviet Union) Mikhail Semyonov	#10	15 November 2013
(Soviet Union) Anatoly Myshkin	#12	16 April 2014
(Soviet Union) Stanislav Yeryomin	#4	16 April 2014
(Soviet Union) Viktor Pankrashkin	#12	3 April 2015
(Soviet Union) Sergei Tarakanov	#6	3 April 2015

== Head coaches ==
Head Coach	Years
(Soviet Union) Victor Grigoriev	1937–1948
(Soviet Union) Konstantin Travin	1948–1952
(Soviet Union) Evgeny Alekseev	1953–1959, 1960–1966
(Soviet Union) Vasily Kolpakov	1959–1960
(Soviet Union) Armenak Alachachian	1968–1970
(Soviet Union) Alexander Gomelsky	1970–1979, 1985–1986
(Soviet Union) Yuri Selikhov	1980–1981, 1982–1985, 1986–1989
(Soviet Union) Sergei Belov	1981–1982, 1989–1990
(Soviet Union) Ivan Edeshko	1990–1992
(Russia) (Russia) Stanislav Yeryomin	1992–2000
(Russia) Valeri Tikhonenko	2000–2002
(Serbia and Montenegro) Dušan Ivković	2002–2005
(Italy) Ettore Messina	2005–2009, 2012–2014
(Russia) Evgeniy Pashutin	2009–2010
(Serbia) Duško Vujošević	2010
(Russia) Dmitry Shakulin	2010–2011
(Lithuania) Jonas Kazlauskas	2011–2012
(Greece) Dimitrios Itoudis	2014–2022
(North Macedonia) Emil Rajković	2022–2024
(Greece) Andreas Pistiolis	2024–present

Alexander Gomelsky, the Father of Soviet and Russian basketball

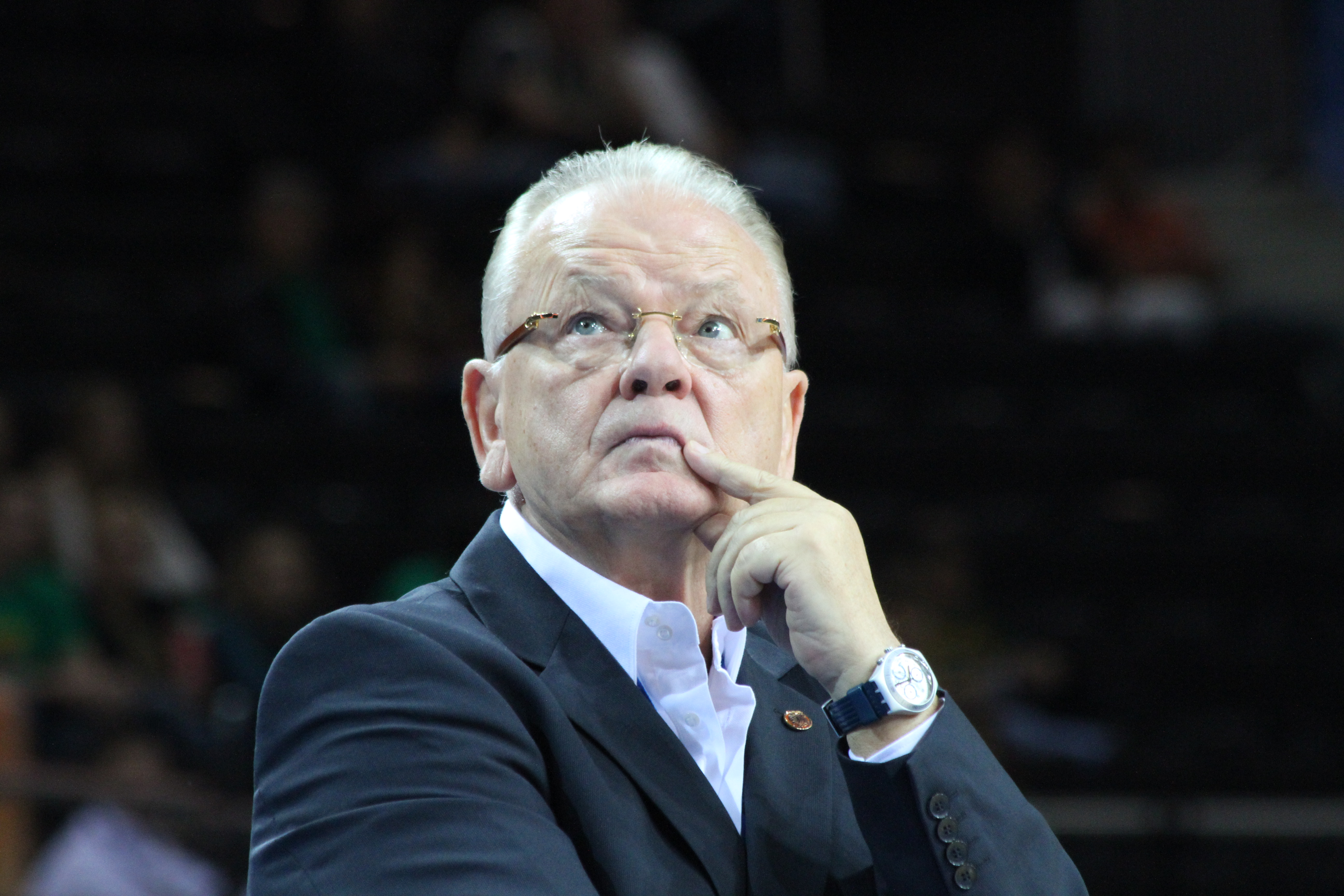
Dušan Ivković, EuroLeague coaching legend

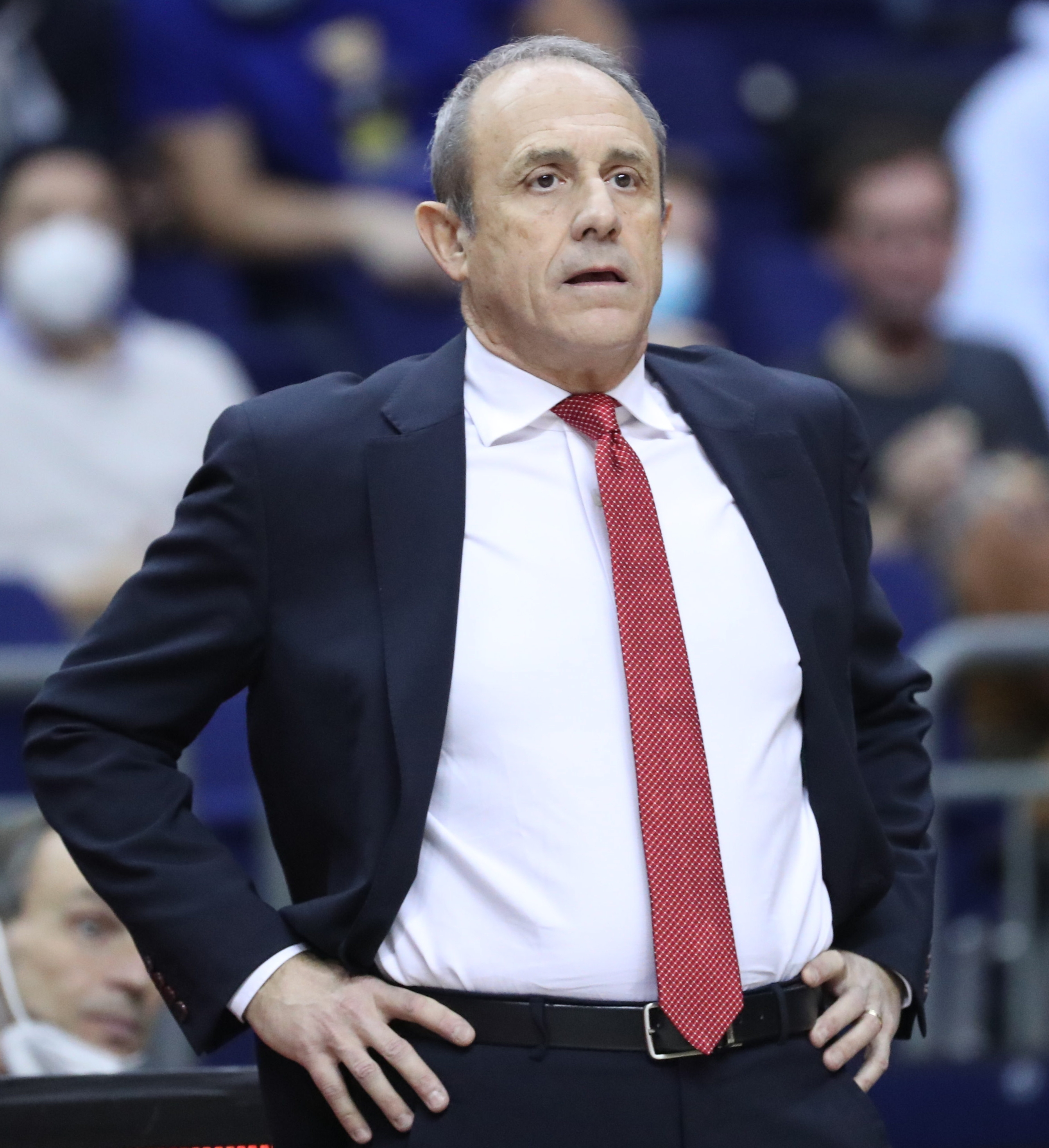
Ettore Messina, one of the 50 Greatest EuroLeague Contributors

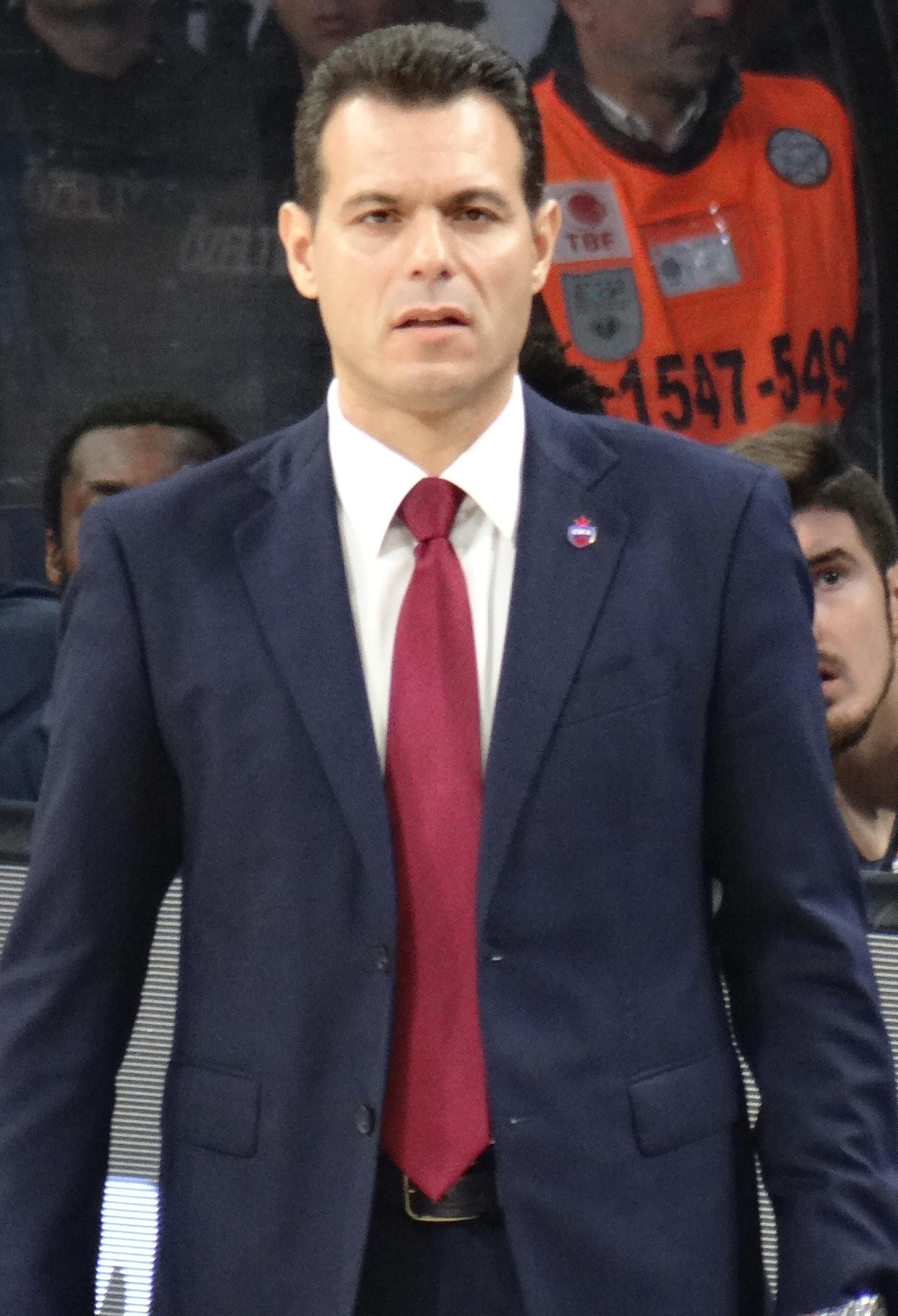
Dimitrios Itoudis, two-time EuroLeague champion

== Matches against NBA teams ==
October 7, 2006

Boxscore

Los Angeles Clippers (United States)	75–94	(Russia) CSKA Moscow

(Russia) Universal Sports Hall CSKA, Moscow

October 11, 2006

Boxscore

Philadelphia 76ers (United States)	85–71	(Russia) CSKA Moscow

(Germany) Kölnarena, Cologne

October 10, 2008

Boxscore

Orlando Magic (United States)	94–66	(Russia) CSKA Moscow

(United States) Amway Arena, Orlando, Florida

October 14, 2008

Boxscore

Toronto Raptors (Canada)	86–78	(Russia) CSKA Moscow

Air Canada Centre, Toronto

October 12, 2010

Boxscore

Miami Heat (United States)	96–85	(Russia) CSKA Moscow

(United States) American Airlines Arena, Miami

October 14, 2010

Boxscore

Oklahoma City Thunder (United States)	97–89	(Russia) CSKA Moscow

(United States) Ford Center, Oklahoma City

October 16, 2010

Boxscore

Cleveland Cavaliers (United States)	87–90	(Russia) CSKA Moscow

(United States) Quicken Loans Arena, Cleveland

7 October 2013

Boxscore

Minnesota Timberwolves (United States)	106–108	(Russia) CSKA Moscow

(United States) Target Center, Minneapolis

9 October 2013

Boxscore

San Antonio Spurs (United States)	95–93	(Russia) CSKA Moscow

(United States) AT&T Center, San Antonio

== See also ==
- 2007–08 PBC CSKA Moscow season
