= 2014 Gomelsky Cup =

The 2014 Gomelsky Cup was a European basketball competition that happened between October 4 and October 5 in Moscow. CSKA Moscow was the champion.

== Participants ==
- (Russia) CSKA Moscow - host
- (Russia) Nizhny Novgorod - Euroleague participant
- (Greece) Panathinaikos - Euroleague participant
- (Lithuania) Lietuvos rytas - Eurocup participant

== Tournament ==
Semifinals
(Russia) CSKA Moscow	87
(Lithuania) Lietuvos rytas	70
(Greece) Panathinaikos	63
(Russia) Nizhny Novgorod	55

Final
(Russia) CSKA Moscow	75
(Greece) Panathinaikos	46
Third place
(Lithuania) Lietuvos rytas	82
(Russia) Nizhny Novgorod	66

=== Semifinal 1 ===
October 4
20:00

Report

CSKA Moscow (Russia)	87–70	(Lithuania) Lietuvos rytas
Scoring by quarter: 22-11, 23-30, 19-18, 23-11
Pts: V. Fridzon 14; Rebs: M. Teodosić, A. Vorontsevich 6 Asts: M. Teodosić 7		Pts: G. Orelikas 16; Rebs: A. Kavaliauskas 7 Asts: A. Juškevičius 4

Moscow, Russia
Attendance: 1570

=== Semifinal 2 ===
October 4
17:00

Report

Panathinaikos (Greece)	63–55	(Russia) Nizhny Novgorod
Scoring by quarter: 17-13, 9-8, 17-17, 20-17
Pts: E. Batista 19; Rebs: E. Batista 16; Asts: D. Diamantidis, A. Slaughter 4		Pts: T. Rochestie 16; Rebs: A. Parakhouski 8 Asts: T. Rochestie 3

Moscow, Russia

=== Third Place ===
October 5
17:00

Report

Lietuvos rytas (Lithuania)	82–66	(Russia) Nizhny Novgorod
Scoring by quarter: 24-11, 19-21, 23-17, 20-26
Pts: A. Kavaliauskas 17; Rebs: M. Moser 9 Asts: M. Gecevičius 7		Pts: T. Thompkis 19; Rebs: T. Kinsey, W. Daniels 6 Asts: T. Kinsey, T. Rochestie 3

Moscow, Russia

=== First Place ===
October 5
20:00

Report

CSKA Moscow (Russia)	75–46	(Greece) Panathinaikos
Scoring by quarter: 22-12, 19-17, 11-11, 23-6
Pts: M. Markoishvili 10; Rebs: M. Markoishvili 8 Asts: 4 players 3		Pts: N. Pappas, V. Janković 11; Rebs: E. Batista 8 Asts: E. Batista, D. Diamantidis 3

Moscow, Russia
