= 2007–08 PBC CSKA Moscow season =

CSKA Moscow
2007–08 season
- Head coach: (Italy) Ettore Messina
- Arena: CSKA Universal Sports Hall (capacity 5,500)

CSKA Moscow 2007– 2008 season is the 2007–08 basketball season for Russian professional basketball club CSKA Moscow.

The 2007–08 season for CSKA Moscow is the 73rd official season of CSKA. The club competing in:

- 2007–08 Euroleague
- 2007–08 Russian Basketball Super League A
- Russian Basketball Cup
- Friendly matches, also CBA Euroleague Challenge.

Current captain of CSKA Moscow – Zakhar Pashutin.

Home court – CSKA Universal Sports Hall, (5,500)

== Results ==
=== Results and schedules ===
Notes: Match-Match in season (number); League-FM:Friendly match, EL:Euroleague, SL:Super League, RC:Russian Cup, CBA:CBA Euroleague Challenge; Arena-A:Away, H:Home

Match	League	Date & Time (CET)	Arena	Team and Score	Result
1	FM	07.09.07, 18:30	A	(Italy) Fortitudo Bologna – (Russia) CSKA Moscow	91–66
2	FM	12.09.07, 20:30	A	(Italy) Ferrara – (Russia) CSKA Moscow	57–77
3	FM	15.09.07, 19:45	A	(Spain) Unicaja Málaga – (Russia) CSKA Moscow	63–72
4	FM	16.09.07, 20:30	A	(Italy) Montepaschi Siena – (Russia) CSKA Moscow	72–67
5	FM	19.09.07, 20:45	A	(Italy) Benetton Treviso – (Russia) CSKA Moscow	65–64
6	FM	21.09.07, 19:00	A	(Turkey) Beşiktaş Cola Turka – (Russia) CSKA Moscow	83–90
7	FM	22.09.07, 21:00	A	(Italy) Virtus Bologna – (Russia) CSKA Moscow	106–77
8	CBA	30.09.07, 13:10	A	(Australia) Sydney Kings – (Russia) CSKA Moscow	62–71
9	CBA	01.10.07, 08:30	A	China – (Russia) CSKA Moscow	77–83
10	SL	03.10.07, 10:00	A	(Russia) Spartak Primorje – (Russia) CSKA Moscow	63–89
11	SL	05.10.07, 12:30	A	(Russia) Enisey – (Russia) CSKA Moscow	63–83
12	SL	06.10.07, 12:00	A	(Russia) Sibirtelecom – (Russia) CSKA Moscow	60–104
13	SL	13.10.07, 16:00	H	(Russia) CSKA Moscow – (Russia) Lokomotiv Rostov	92–69
14	SL	17.10.07, 17:00	H	(Russia) CSKA Moscow – (Russia) CSK VSS Samara	97–62
15	EL	22.10.07, 20:15	A	(Poland) Prokom Trefl Sopot – (Russia) CSKA Moscow	69–88
16	SL	27.10.07, 13:30	A	(Russia) Ural Great – (Russia) CSKA Moscow	69–75
17	EL	31.10.07, 18:15	H	(Russia) CSKA Moscow – (Russia) Lokomotiv Rostov	74–70
18	SL	01.11.07, 16:00	H	(Russia) CSKA Moscow – (Russia) Triumph Lyubertsy	93–74
19	EL	07.11.07, 20:45	A	(Slovenia) Olimpija Ljubljana – (Russia) CSKA Moscow	74–72
20	SL	10.11.07, 15:00	H	(Russia) CSKA Moscow – (Russia) Dynamo Moscow	80–82
21	EL	14.11.07, 18:15	H	(Russia) CSKA Moscow – (Greece) Olympiacos	88–79
22	SL	17.11.07, 13:00	A	(Russia) Universitet – (Russia) CSKA Moscow	63–85
23	EL	21.11.07, 20:15	H	(Russia) CSKA Moscow – (Lithuania) BC Žalgiris	78–70
24	SL	24.11.07, 17:00	H	(Russia) CSKA Moscow – (Russia) UNICS Kazan	93–61
25	EL	29.11.07, 22:00	A	(Spain) TAU Cerámica – (Russia) CSKA Moscow	76–85
26	SL	02.12.07, 17:00	H	(Russia) CSKA Moscow – (Russia) Spartak St. Pet.	78–65
27	EL	05.12.07, 20:15	H	(Russia) CSKA Moscow – (Italy) Virtus Bologna	79–53

==== Detailed Results ====
Times are in CET

September 7
18:30

FM

Fortitudo Bologna (Italy)	91–66	(Russia) CSKA Moscow
Scoring by quarter: 18–22, 17–6, 16–28, 40–10

Italy

September 12
22:30

FM

Ferrara (Italy)	57–77	(Russia) CSKA Moscow
Scoring by quarter: 18–17, 18–23, 7–23, 16–14

Italy

September 15
19:45

FM

Unicaja Málaga (Spain)	63–72	(Russia) CSKA Moscow
Scoring by quarter: 19–19, 19–24, 8–13, 17–16

Italy

September 16
20:30

FM

Montepaschi Siena (Italy)	72–67	(Russia) CSKA Moscow
Scoring by quarter: 20–20, 15–22, 16–11, 21–14

Italy

September 19
20:45

FM

Benetton Treviso (Italy)	65–64	(Russia) CSKA Moscow
Scoring by quarter: 16–17, 11–20, 16–11, 22–16

Italy

September 21
19:00

FM

Beşiktaş Cola Turka (Turkey)	83–90	(Russia) CSKA Moscow
Scoring by quarter: 25–26, 15–15, 23–27, 20–22

Italy

September 22
21:00

FM

Virtus Bologna (Italy)	106–77	(Russia) CSKA Moscow
Scoring by quarter: 25–13, 26–9, 23–30, 32–25

Italy

September 30
13:10

CBA

Sydney Kings (Australia)	62–71	(Russia) CSKA Moscow
Scoring by quarter: 14–23, 18–20, 11–17, 19–11
Pts: Dontaye Draper 19; Rebs: Glen Saville 6 Asts: Draper, Jason Smith, Saville 1		Pts: Aleksey Savrasenko 13; Rebs: David Andersen 8 Asts: Theodoros Papaloukas 4

Kunshan, China
Attendance: 4,500

October 1
13:10

CBA

China	77–83	(Russia) CSKA Moscow
Scoring by quarter: 17–21, 16–17, 28–23, 16–22
Pts: Yao Ming 27; Rebs: Yi Jianlian 6 Asts: Zhu Fangyu 4		Pts: Trajan Langdon 22; Rebs: Langdon, Vorontsevich 7 Asts: Nikos Zisis 3

Kunshan, China
Attendance: 5000

September 21
19:00

SL

Spartak Primorje (Russia)	63–89	(Russia) CSKA Moscow
Scoring by quarter: 22–25, 12–20, 9–19, 20–25
Pts: - Rebs: – Asts: –		Pts: Aleksey Savrasenko 13; Rebs: David Andersen 9 Asts: Jon Robert Holden 5

SK Olimpiets, Vladivostok
Attendance: 3100
