= 2009 Gomelsky Cup =

2009 Gomelsky Cup tournament was held from October 2 till October 3, 2009. Four European teams competed against each other for the Gomelsky Cup title.

== Participants ==
- (Russia) CSKA Moscow – host team
- (Greece) Panathinaikos Athens – Euroleague 2008–09 champion
- (Lithuania) Lietuvos Rytas Vilnius – ULEB Cup 2008-09 champion
- (Russia) Triumph Lyubertsy – EuroChallenge 2008-09 semi-finalist

== Competition ==
Semi-finals
(Russia) CSKA Moscow	74
(Lithuania) Lietuvos Rytas Vilnius	67
(Greece) Panathinaikos Athens	66
(Russia) Triumph Lyubertsy	62

Final
(Russia) CSKA Moscow	72
(Greece) Panathinaikos Athens	78
Third place
(Lithuania) Lietuvos Rytas Vilnius	94
(Russia) Triumph Lyubertsy	90

October 2

Panathinaikos BC (Greece)	66–62	(Russia) BC Triumph
Scoring by quarter: 15-24, 21-12, 13-16, 17-10
Pts: Nikola Peković 16; Rebs: Kostas Tsartsaris 8		Pts: Brion Rush 23; Rebs: Brion Rush 7

October 2

CSKA Moscow (Russia)	74–67	(Lithuania) BC Lietuvos Rytas
Scoring by quarter: 19-24, 23-12, 17-19, 15-12
Pts: Ramūnas Šiškauskas 18; Rebs: Zoran Planinić, Nikita Kurbanov, Ivan Radenović 7		Pts: Donatas Zavackas, Milko Bjelica, Bojan Popović 13; Rebs: Bojan Popović 6

October 3

CSKA Moscow (Russia)	72–78	(Greece) Panathinaikos BC
Scoring by quarter: 17-17, 18-20, 20-24, 17-17
Pts: Trajan Langdon 17; Rebs: Nikita Kurbanov 8		Pts: Nikola Peković 22; Rebs: Nikola Peković 5

October 3

BC Lietuvos Rytas (Lithuania)	94–90 (OT) ()	(Russia) BC Triumph
Scoring by quarter: 29-20, 14-15, 17-16, 17-26, Overtime: 17-13
Pts: Justas Sinica 26; Rebs: Steponas Babrauskas, Milko Bjelica 7		Pts: Nikita Shabalkin, Brion Rush 18; Rebs: Evgeny Valiev 6
