= 2006 Euroleague Final Four =

Basketball tournament

- Season: 2005–06 Euroleague

Tournament details
- Arena: O2 Arena; Prague, Czech Republic
- Dates: April 28–30, 2006

Final positions
- Champions: (Russia) CSKA Moscow (5th title)
- Runners-up: (Israel) Maccabi Tel Aviv
- Third place: (Spain) TAU Cerámica
- Fourth place: (Spain) Winterthur FC Barcelona

Awards and statistics
- MVP: (Greece) Theo Papaloukas

The 2006 Euroleague Final Four was the concluding Euroleague Final Four tournament of the 2005–06 Euroleague season. The event was held on April 28 and on April 30, 2006 at the O2 Arena in Prague. CSKA Moscow won its fifth EuroLeague championship, after beating Maccabi Tel Aviv in the Final.

== Bracket ==
Semi-finals
April 28, Prague
(Israel) Maccabi Elite	85
(Spain) Tau Cerámica	70
April 28, Prague
(Spain) Winterthur FCB	75
(Russia) CSKA Moscow	84

Final
April 30, Prague
(Russia) CSKA Moscow	73
(Israel) Maccabi Elite	69
Third place
April 30, Prague
(Spain) Winterthur FCB	82
(Spain) Tau Cerámica	87

== Semifinals ==
28 April 2006
17:30

Report

Maccabi Elite (Israel)	85–70	(Spain) Tau Cerámica
Scoring by quarter: 24–17, 27–15, 22–16, 12–22
Pts: Baston 20; Rebs: Vujčić 8 Asts: Vujčić 7		Pts: Scola 17; Rebs: Scola 11; Asts: Scola 5

Sazka Arena, Prague
Attendance: 16,805
Referees: Brazauskas (LTU), Koukoulekidis (GRE), Belošević (SCG)

28 April 2006
20:30

Report

Winterthur FC Barcelona (Spain)	75–84	(Russia) CSKA Moscow
Scoring by quarter: 20–15, 18–19, 14–23, 23–27
Pts: Williams 24; Rebs: Fučka 10; Asts: Williams 4		Pts: Holden, Papaloukas 19; Rebs: Smodiš 12; Asts: Langdon 3

Sazka Arena, Prague
Attendance: 16,805
Referees: Jungebrand (FIN), Zavlanos (GRE), Facchini (ITA), Ramot (ISR)

== Third Place game ==
30 April 2006
17:30

Report

Winterthur FC Barcelona (Spain)	82–87	(Spain) Tau Cerámica
Scoring by quarter: 19–26, 17–21, 24–15, 22–25
Pts: Fučka, Navarro 20; Rebs: Fučka 9 Asts: Williams 4		Pts: Drobnjak 19; Rebs: Drobnjak, Scola 12; Asts: Prigioni 6

Sazka Arena, Prague
Attendance: 16,805
Referees: Zavlanos (GRE), Jovčić (SCG), Sahin (ITA)

== Final ==
Maccabi came to the game looking for their third consecutive title. however, CSKA snatched a narrow 4-point victory to win its fifth title.

30 April 2006
20:30

Report

CSKA Moscow (Russia)	73–69	(Israel) Maccabi Elite
Scoring by quarter: 18–18, 17–12, 14–18, 24–21
Pts: Papaloukas 18; Rebs: Smodiš 8 Asts: Papaloukas 7		Pts: Solomon 20; Rebs: Baston 15; Asts: three players 2

Sazka Arena, Prague
Attendance: 16,805
Referees: Jungebrand (FIN), Koukoulekidis (GRE), Belošević (SCG)

CSKA Moscow	Maccabi Elite

Starters:			P	R	A
PG	10	(Russia) J.R. Holden	6	3	0
SG	21	(United States) Trajan Langdon	11	0	1
SF	9	(United States) David Vanterpool	16	3	4
PF	8	(Slovenia) Matjaž Smodiš	12	8	1
C	14	(Russia) Aleksey Savrasenko	10	4	0
Reserves:			P	R	A
PG	4	(Greece) Theo Papaloukas	18	3	7
PF	5	(Russia) Nikita Kurbanov	DNP		
PF	6	(Russia) Sergey Panov (C)	0	0	0
SG	7	(Russia) Vasily Zavourev	DNP		
SF	11	(Russia) Zakhar Pashutin	DNP		
PF	12	(Russia) Vladimir Dyachok	DNP		
PG	23	(Russia) Alexey Shved	3	2	2
C	22	(Belgium) Tomas Van Den Spiegel	0	2	0
Head coach:
(Italy) Ettore Messina

2005–06 Euroleague
Champions

CSKA Moscow
5th title

Starters:			P	R	A
PG	15	(United States) Will Solomon	20	1	2
SG	8	(United States) Anthony Parker	10	5	2
SF	10	(Israel) Tal Burstein	9	7	2
PF	5	(United States) Maceo Baston	6	15	0
C	7	(Croatia) Nikola Vujčić	4	5	1
Reserves:			P	R	A
PG	6	(Israel) Derrick Sharp	3	0	0
PF	11	(Israel) Sharon Shason	0	0	0
SG	12	(Israel) Assaf Dotan	DNP		
PF	14	(Israel) Omri Casspi	DNP		
SF	20	(New Zealand) Kirk Penney	3	0	0
SG	23	(Israel) Jamie Arnold	14	4	0
C	41	(Israel) Yaniv Green	DNP		
Head coach:
(Israel) Pini Gershon

== Awards ==
=== Euroleague Final Four MVP ===
- (Greece) Theo Papaloukas ( (Russia) CSKA Moscow)

=== Euroleague Finals Top Scorer ===
- (United States) Will Solomon ( (Israel) Maccabi Tel Aviv)
