= 2012 Gomelsky Cup =

The 2012 Gomelsky Cup was a European basketball competition that happened between September 29 and September 30 in Moscow. CSKA Moscow was the champion.

== Participants ==
- (Russia) CSKA Moscow - host
- (Russia) Lokomotiv-Kuban Krasnodar - Eurocup participant
- (Greece) Olympiacos Piraeus - Euroleague participant
- (Lithuania) Žalgiris Kaunas - Euroleague participant

== Tournament ==
Semifinals
(Russia) Lokomotiv-Kuban	82
(Greece) Olympiacos Piraeus	79
(Russia) CSKA Moscow	89
(Lithuania) Žalgiris Kaunas	87

Final
(Russia) Lokomotiv-Kuban	65
(Russia) CSKA Moscow	82
Third place
(Greece) Olympiacos Piraeus	86
(Lithuania) Žalgiris Kaunas	75

=== Semifinal 1 ===
September 29
17:00

Report

Lokomotiv-Kuban (Russia)	82–79	(Greece) Olympiacos Piraeus
Scoring by quarter: 20-16, 15-18, 23-31, 24-14
Pts: Baron 21; Rebs: Calathes 6 Asts: Calathes 8		Pts: Spanoulis 17; Rebs: Dorsey 8 Asts: Spanoulis 6

Moscow, Russia
Attendance: 500

=== Semifinal 2 ===
September 29
20:00

Report

CSKA Moscow (Russia)	89–87	(Lithuania) Zalgiris Kaunas
Scoring by quarter: 23-28, 19-15, 26-28, 21-16
Pts: Kaun 19; Rebs: Kaun 7 Asts: Ponkrashov 4		Pts: Popovic 12; Rebs: Darden 6 Asts: Kaukenas 4

Moscow, Russia
Attendance: 1500

=== Third Place ===
September 30
17:00

Report

Olympiacos Piraeus (Greece)	86–75	(Lithuania) Zalgiris Kaunas
Scoring by quarter: 24-11, 19-21, 23-17, 20-26
Pts: Printezis 20; Rebs: Dorsey 7 Asts: Papanikolaou 5		Pts: Foote 13; Rebs: Klimavicius, Foote 6 Asts: Kalnietis 5

Moscow, Russia
Attendance: 500

=== First Place ===
September 30
20:00

Report

Lokomotiv-Kuban (Russia)	65–82	(Russia) CSKA Moscow
Scoring by quarter: 17-16, 19-25, 11-22, 18-19
Pts: Calathes, Maric 14; Rebs: Maric 9 Asts: Calathes 6		Pts: Teodosic 12; Rebs: Krstic, Vorontsevich 5 Asts: Teodosic 6

Moscow, Russia
Attendance: 1000
