= David Vanterpool =

American basketball player and coach (born 1973)

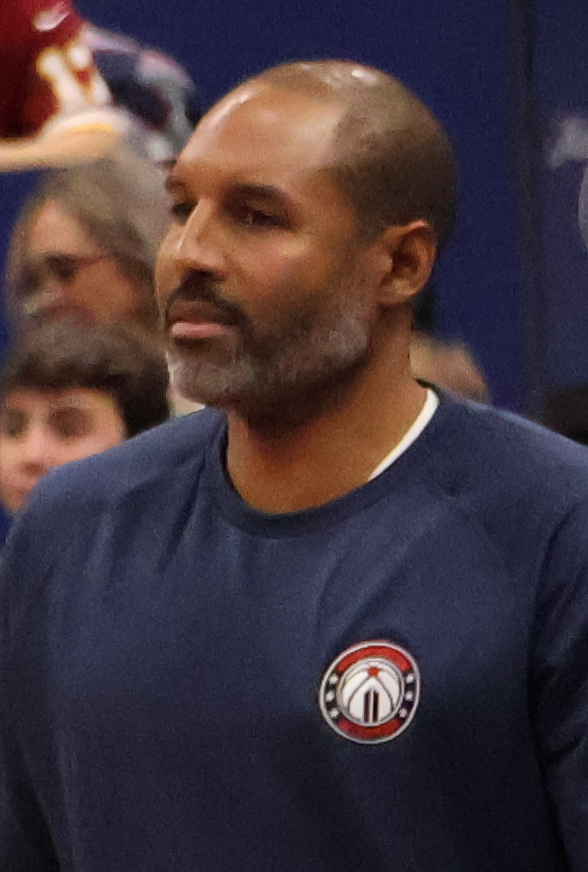
- Vanterpool with the Washington Wizards in 2024

Washington Wizards
- Title: Assistant coach
- League: NBA

Personal information
- Born: March 31, 1973 (age 53) Daytona Beach, Florida, U.S.
- Listed height: 6 ft 5 in (1.96 m)
- Listed weight: 200 lb (91 kg)

Career information
- High school: Montgomery Blair (Silver Spring, Maryland)
- College: St. Bonaventure (1991–1995)
- NBA draft: 1995: undrafted
- Playing career: 1996–2007
- Position: Shooting guard / small forward
- Number: 22
- Coaching career: 2007–present

Career history

Playing
- 1995: Nuova Gorizia
- 1996–1999: Jilin Northeast Tigers
- 1999–2001: Yakima Sun Kings
- 2001: Washington Wizards
- 2001–2002: Kansas City Knights
- 2001–2002: Sina Lions
- 2002–2003: Scandone Avellino
- 2003–2005: Montepaschi Siena
- 2005–2007: CSKA Moscow

Coaching
- 2008–2009: CSKA Moscow (assistant)
- 2012–2019: Portland Trail Blazers (assistant)
- 2019–2021: Minnesota Timberwolves (associate HC)
- 2021–2022: Brooklyn Nets (assistant)
- 2023–2026: Washington Wizards (assistant)

Career highlights
- As player: 2× Russian League champion (2006, 2007); 2× Russian Cup winner (2006, 2007); EuroLeague champion (2006); All-EuroLeague Second Team (2004); Italian League champion (2004); Italian Supercup winner (2004); Italian Supercup MVP (2004); ABA champion (2002); CBA champion (2000); CBA All-Defensive First Team (2000); CBA assists leader (2001); First-team All-Atlantic 10 (1995); Atlantic 10 All-Freshman team (1992); As assistant coach: EuroLeague champion (2008); 5× Russian League champion (2008–2012); 3× VTB United League champion (2008, 2010, 2012)
- Stats at NBA.com
- Stats at Basketball Reference

David Lawrence Vanterpool (born March 31, 1973) is an American professional basketball coach and former player. He currently serves in a front office role for the Washington Wizards of the National Basketball Association (NBA). During his playing career, he earned an All-EuroLeague Second Team selection during the 2003–04 season, while playing with Montepaschi Siena.

== College career ==
Vanterpool played high school basketball at Montgomery Blair High School, in Silver Spring, Maryland, before playing college basketball at St. Bonaventure University, with the St. Bonaventure Bonnies, between 1991 and 1995, leading the team in scoring his senior year when they played in the NIT for the first time in over a decade.

== Playing career ==
In 1995, Vanterpool was selected in the Continental Basketball Association (CBA) draft by the Quad City Thunder. In October–November 1995, he played for a week in Italy, with the LegADue (Italian second division) team Brescialat Gorizia. From 1996 to 1999, Vanterpool played for the Jilin Northeast Tigers in the Chinese New Basketball Alliance (CNBA) (1996–1997), and in the Chinese Basketball Association (CBA) (1998–99). He played with the Continental Basketball Association's Yakima Sun Kings, between 1999 and 2001, winning the CBA title in 2000.

He also played in 22 games with the Washington Wizards of the NBA, in the 2000–01 season, and with the ABA's Kansas City Knights, in the 2001–02 season. He was also signed for a brief period by the NBA's Detroit Pistons (2000), and the New Jersey Nets (2001), but he did not play in any NBA games for those clubs.

Vanterpool then played in Italy with Air Avellino (2002–2003), and Montepaschi Siena, from 2003 through 2005 (he won the Italian League championship in 2004 and the Italian SuperCup in 2004), before moving to CSKA Moscow, with whom he won a EuroLeague championship at the 2006 EuroLeague Final Four.

== Coaching career ==
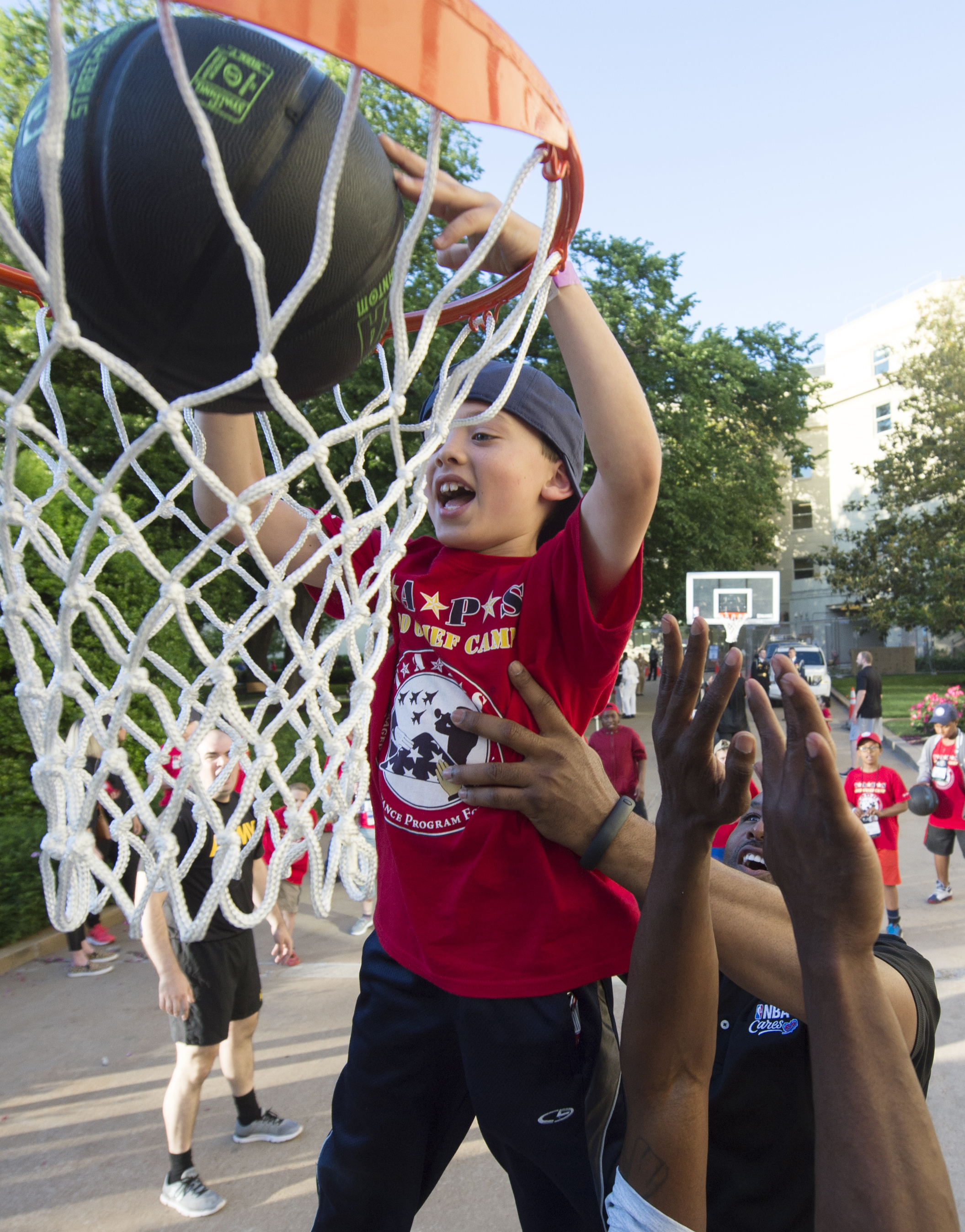
Vanterpool (right, obscured) lifts a child to dunk during a Tragedy Assistance Program for Survivors event in 2017

After finishing his basketball playing career with CSKA Moscow, Vanterpool became an assistant basketball coach with the same team in 2008, and worked in that capacity for one season. In 2010, he was hired as director of player personnel by the Oklahoma City Thunder.

On August 17, 2012, Vanterpool was named as an assistant coach of the NBA's Portland Trail Blazers. Vanterpool would go on to play a significant part in the development of Trailblazers' stars Damian Lillard and C. J. McCollum. Lillard would credit Vanterpool specifically with helping him develop leadership skills.

In July 2013, he interviewed for the head coaching vacancy for the Philadelphia 76ers.

On June 2, 2015, Vanterpool and Jim Boylen were named to the coaching staff of the senior men's Canadian national team. Also in June 2015, he interviewed for the head coaching vacancy for the Denver Nuggets.

In May 2016, he interviewed for the head coaching vacancy for the Orlando Magic. He interviewed again for the same job in April 2018.

In May 2019, he interviewed for the head coaching vacancy for the Cleveland Cavaliers.

On June 19, 2019, he was hired by the Minnesota Timberwolves, as an associate head coach to Ryan Saunders.

In October 2020, he interviewed for the head coaching vacancy for the Houston Rockets. At the time, two of his most prominent former players with the Trailblazers, McCollum and the All-Star Lillard, both endorsed him as a future head coaching candidate.

On February 21, 2021, the Timberwolves hired Toronto Raptors assistant coach Chris Finch as their head coach and chose not to interview Vanterpool as part of their hiring process.

On July 9, 2021, Vanterpool was hired as assistant coach by the Brooklyn Nets.

On January 20, 2022, Vanterpool was fined $10,000 and the Nets $25,000 by the NBA for interfering during live play by blocking a pass against the Washington Wizards in a January 19 game.

On July 5, 2026, it was reported that Vanterpool would be shifting to a role in Washington's front office.

== NBA career statistics ==
Legend
| GP | Games played | GS | Games started | MPG | Minutes per game |
| FG% | Field goal percentage | 3P% | 3-point field goal percentage | FT% | Free throw percentage |
| RPG | Rebounds per game | APG | Assists per game | SPG | Steals per game |
| BPG | Blocks per game | PPG | Points per game | **Bold** | Career high |

=== Regular season ===
| Year | Team | GP | GS | MPG | FG% | 3P% | FT% | RPG | APG | SPG | BPG | PPG |
|---|---|---|---|---|---|---|---|---|---|---|---|---|
| 2000–01 | Washington | 22 | 0 | 18.7 | .418 | .000 | .600 | 1.7 | 3.0 | 1.0 | .1 | 5.5 |
| Career | | 22 | 0 | 18.7 | .418 | .000 | .600 | 1.7 | 3.0 | 1.0 | .1 | 5.5 |
