= Aleksey Savrasenko =

Russian-Greek basketball player

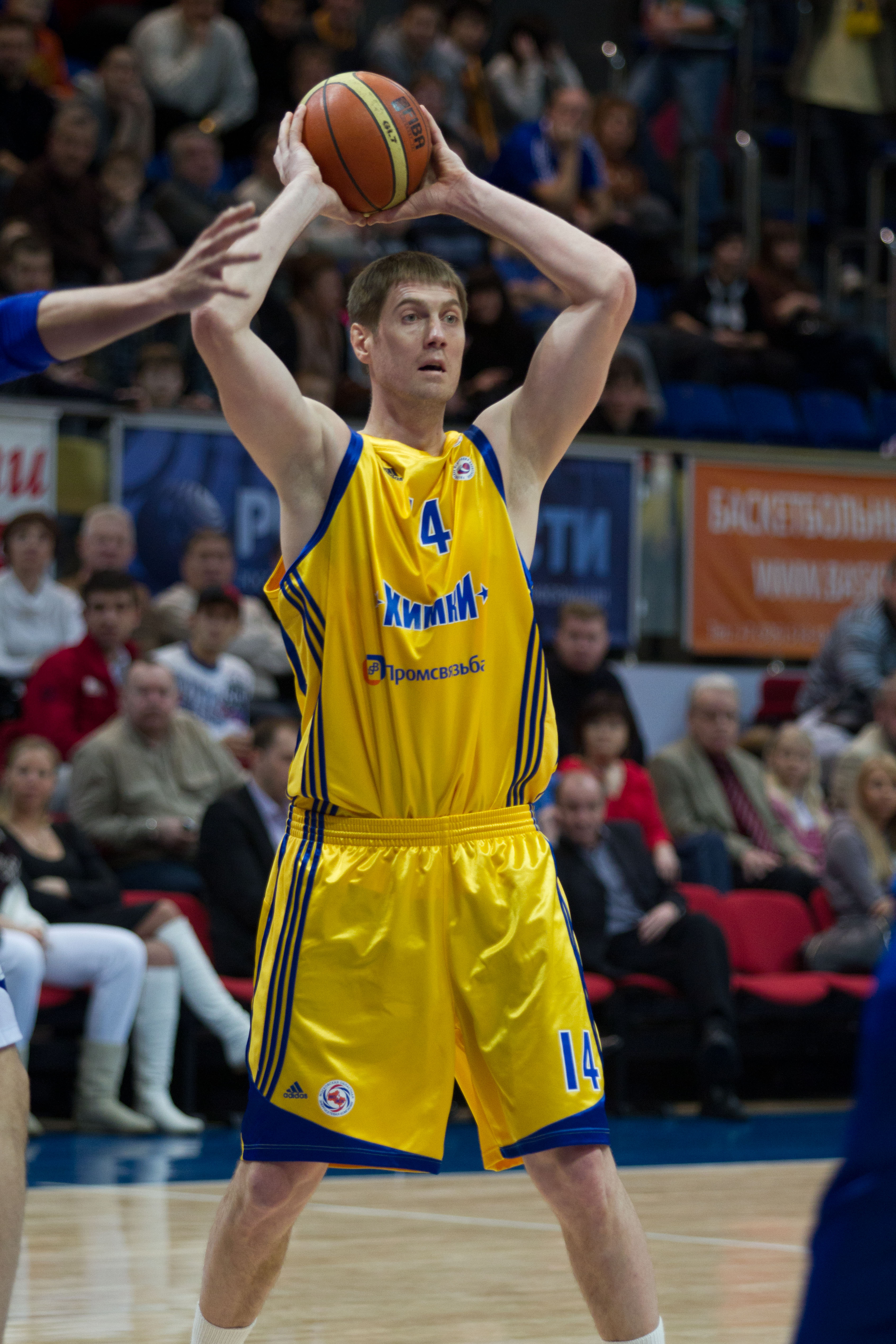

Personal information
- Born: February 28, 1979 (age 47) Krasnodar, Russian SFSR, Soviet Union
- Listed height: 218 cm (7 ft 2 in)
- Listed weight: 290 lb (132 kg)

Career information
- NBA draft: 2001: undrafted
- Playing career: 1995–2013
- Position: Center

Career history
- 1995–2002: Olympiacos Piraeus
- 2000–2001: →Peristeri Athens
- 2002–2009: CSKA Moscow
- 2009: →Spartak St. Petersburg
- 2009–2010: Dynamo Moscow
- 2010–2011: Khimki
- 2011–2012: UNICS Kazan
- 2012–2013: Lokomotiv Kuban Krasnodar

Career highlights
- 2× Triple Crown winner (1997, 2006); 3× EuroLeague champion (1997, 2006, 2008); FIBA EuroStar (2007); EuroCup champion (2013); 2× Greek League champion (1996, 1997); 2× Greek Cup winner (1997, 2002); 6× Russian Championship champion (2003, 2004, 2005, 2006, 2007, 2008); 3× Russian Cup winner (2005, 2006, 2007); Russian Cup MVP (2007)
Medals
Men's basketball
Representing Russia
FIBA EuroBasket
Gold medal – first place	2007 Spain

Alexey Dmitrievitch Savrasenko (alternate spelling: Alexei) (Russian: Алексей Дмитриевич Саврасенко; born February 28, 1979) is a retired Russian-Greek professional basketball player. He played at the center position.

Because of half-Greek origin from his mother's side, he has dual citizenship in both Russia and Greece. In fact, his Greek passport states his name as Alexis Amanatidis (Greek: Αλέξης Αμανατίδης).

== Professional career ==
In June 2011, Savrasenko signed a one-year contract with UNICS Kazan. On August 24, 2012, Savrasenko reached a one-year deal with Lokomotiv Kuban Krasnodar. He retired from professional basketball at the end of the 2012–13 season.

== National team career ==
As a member of the senior men's Russian national basketball team, Savrasenko played at the 2002 FIBA World Championship. He also played at the following FIBA EuroBaskets: FIBA EuroBasket 2001, FIBA EuroBasket 2003, FIBA EuroBasket 2005, and FIBA EuroBasket 2007. He won the gold medal at the FIBA EuroBasket 2007.

== Awards and achievements ==
=== Pro clubs ===
- 2× Greek League Champion: (1996, 1997)
- 2× Greek Cup Winner: (1997, 2002)
- 3× EuroLeague Champion: (1997, 2006, 2008)
- 2× Triple Crown Champion: (1997, 2006)
- 6× Russian Championship Champion: (2003, 2004, 2005, 2006, 2007, 2008)
- 3× Russian Cup Winner: (2005, 2006, 2007)
- Russian Cup MVP: (2007)
- EuroCup Champion: (2013)

=== Russian senior national team ===
- FIBA EuroStar: (2007)
- 2007 EuroBasket: Gold
