= 2011 Gomelsky Cup =

The 2011 Gomelsky Cup is a European basketball competition that occurred between September 24 and September 25 in Moscow.

== Participants ==
- (Russia) CSKA Moscow - host
- (Turkey) Fenerbahçe Ülker - Euroleague participant
- (Greece) Panathinaikos Athens - Euroleague participant
- (Lithuania) Žalgiris Kaunas - Euroleague participant

== Results ==
Semifinals; October 1
(Greece) Panathinaikos	85
(Turkey) Fenerbahçe Ülker	88
(Russia) CSKA Moscow	69
(Lithuania) Žalgiris Kaunas	61

Final; October 3
(Russia) CSKA Moscow	73
(Turkey) Fenerbahçe Ülker	57
Third place
(Greece) Panathinaikos	80
(Lithuania) Žalgiris Kaunas	66

September 25

(Russia) CSKA Moscow	73–57	(Turkey) Fenerbahçe Ülker
Scoring by quarter: 18-14, 22-15, 17-12, 16-16
Pts: Shved, Krstić 14; Rebs: Gordon 8 Asts: Shved 5		Pts: Jerrells 15; Rebs: Gist 5 Asts: Preldžić 2

September 25

(Greece) Panathinaikos	80–66	(Lithuania) Žalgiris Kaunas
Scoring by quarter: 16-17, 25-12, 22-14, 17-23
Pts: Marić 19; Rebs: P. Calathes 10; Asts: Diamantidis 7		Pts: Lawson 17; Rebs: Raković, Klimavičius 6 Asts: Lawson 5
