= Gomelsky Cup =

Annual basketball tournament in Moscow, Russia

- Sport: Basketball
- Founded: 2008
- No. of teams: 4
- Country: FIBA Europe members
- Continent: Europe
- Most recent champion: (Russia) CSKA Moscow
- Most titles: (Russia) CSKA Moscow (10 titles)

The Gomelsky Cup is an annual basketball tournament held in Moscow in the fall. Four European teams are selected to participate in the tournament. The four teams face off in the semifinal bracket; the two winners of each match play each other, while the losers also play each other for third place. The hosts CSKA Moscow have won seven consecutive titles since 2010 till 2016, and in 2018-2020 and it is the current champion.

The tournament is named after CSKA's legendary basketball coach, Alexander Gomelsky, one of the most influential figures in the history of European basketball who played a crucial role in the development of the sport in the former Soviet Union.

== Tournaments ==
=== 2008 ===
Semifinals
(Russia) CSKA Moscow	81
(Lithuania) Žalgiris Kaunas	83
(Greece) Panathinaikos	100
(Israel) Maccabi Tel Aviv	96

Final
(Lithuania) Žalgiris Kaunas	80
(Greece) Panathinaikos	69
Third place
(Russia) CSKA Moscow	76
(Israel) Maccabi Tel Aviv	59

=== 2009 ===
Semi-finals
(Russia) CSKA Moscow	74
(Lithuania) Lietuvos Rytas	67
(Greece) Panathinaikos	66
(Russia) Triumph Lyubertsy	62

Final
(Russia) CSKA Moscow	72
(Greece) Panathinaikos	78
Third place
(Lithuania) Lietuvos Rytas	94
(Russia) Triumph Lyubertsy	90

=== 2010 ===
Semifinals
(Russia) CSKA Moscow	75
(Serbia) Partizan Belgrade	63
(Greece) Panathinaikos	70
(Lithuania) Žalgiris Kaunas	76

Final
(Russia) CSKA Moscow	79
(Lithuania) Žalgiris Kaunas	73
Third place
(Greece) Panathinaikos	73
(Serbia) Partizan Belgrade	68

=== 2011 ===
Semifinals
(Greece) Panathinaikos	85
(Turkey) Fenerbahçe Ülker	88
(Russia) CSKA Moscow	69
(Lithuania) Žalgiris Kaunas	61

Final
(Russia) CSKA Moscow	73
(Turkey) Fenerbahçe Ülker	57
Third place
(Greece) Panathinaikos	80
(Lithuania) Žalgiris Kaunas	66

=== 2012 ===
Semifinals
(Russia) Lokomotiv Kuban	82
(Greece) Olympiacos Piraeus	79
(Russia) CSKA Moscow	89
(Lithuania) Žalgiris Kaunas	87

Final
(Russia) Lokomotiv Kuban	65
(Russia) CSKA Moscow	82
Third place
(Greece) Olympiacos Piraeus	86
(Lithuania) Žalgiris Kaunas	75

=== 2013 ===
Semifinals
(Russia) CSKA Moscow	72
(Greece) Panathinaikos	49
(Israel) Maccabi Tel Aviv	61
(Russia) Lokomotiv Kuban	71

Final
(Russia) CSKA Moscow	76
(Russia) Lokomotiv Kuban	65
Third place
(Greece) Panathinaikos	80
(Israel) Maccabi Tel Aviv	74

=== 2014 ===
Semifinals
(Russia) CSKA Moscow	87
(Lithuania) Lietuvos rytas	70
(Greece) Panathinaikos	63
(Russia) Nizhny Novgorod	55

Final
(Russia) CSKA Moscow	75
(Greece) Panathinaikos	46
Third place
(Lithuania) Lietuvos rytas	82
(Russia) Nizhny Novgorod	66

=== 2015 ===
Semifinals
(Greece) Panathinaikos	89
(Russia) UNICS Kazan	74
(Russia) CSKA Moscow	102
(Spain) Laboral Kutxa	74

Final
(Russia) CSKA Moscow	81
(Greece) Panathinaikos	80
Third place
(Russia) UNICS Kazan	90
(Spain) Laboral Kutxa	86

=== 2016 ===
Semifinals
(Israel) Maccabi Tel Aviv	90
(Greece) Panathinaikos	88
(Russia) CSKA Moscow	84
(Russia) Unics Kazan	75

Final
(Israel) Maccabi Tel Aviv	73
(Russia) CSKA Moscow	95
Third place
(Greece) Panathinaikos	69
(Russia) Unics Kazan	58

=== 2017 ===
Semifinals
(Russia) BC Khimki	73
(Greece) Panathinaikos	70
(Russia) CSKA Moscow	81
(Turkey) Darüşşafaka	75

Final
(Russia) CSKA Moscow	77
(Russia) BC Khimki	84
Third place
(Turkey) Darüşşafaka	78
(Greece) Panathinaikos	75

=== 2018 ===
Semifinals
(Turkey) Anadolu Efes	78
(Greece) Olympiacos	70
(Russia) CSKA Moscow	96
(Russia) UNICS Kazan	65

Final
(Russia) CSKA Moscow	87
(Turkey) Anadolu Efes	83
Third place
(Greece) Olympiacos	91
(Russia) UNICS Kazan	89

=== 2019 ===
Semifinals
(Russia) UNICS Kazan	66
(Greece) Olympiacos	70
(Russia) CSKA Moscow	77
(Greece) Promitheas	57

Final
(Russia) CSKA Moscow	91
(Greece) Olympiacos	66
Third place
(Greece) Promitheas	87
(Russia) UNICS Kazan	83

=== 2020 (Note: Crvena zvezda mts, Lokomotiv Kuban and UNICS Kazan were supposed to take part in the tournament, but had to refuse due to the COVID-19 pandemic restrictions.) ===
Semifinals
17 September
(Russia) Parma	87
(Russia) CSKA-2	75
17 September
(Russia) CSKA Moscow	106
(Russia) MBA Moscow	59

Final
18 September
(Russia) CSKA Moscow	91
(Russia) Parma	51
Third place
18 September
(Russia) MBA Moscow	71
(Russia) CSKA-2	83

== Medal count ==
Medal Count
Team	Gold medal	Silver medal	Bronze medal	Total
(Russia) CSKA Moscow	10	2	1	13
(Greece) Panathinaikos	1	3	4	8
(Lithuania) Žalgiris Kaunas	1	1	0	2
(Russia) Khimki	1	0	0	1
(Russia) Lokomotiv Kuban	0	2	0	2
(Greece) Olympiacos	0	1	2	3
(Turkey) Anadolu Efes	0	1	0	1
(Turkey) Fenerbahçe Ülker	0	1	0	1
(Russia) Parma	0	1	0	1
(Lithuania) Lietuvos Rytas	0	0	2	2
(Russia) UNICS Kazan	0	0	1	1
(Turkey) Darüşşafaka	0	0	1	1
(Greece) Promitheas	0	0	1	1
(Russia) CSKA-2	0	0	1	1
