= Coach (2018 film) =

- Theatrical release poster
- Directed by: Danila Kozlovsky
- Written by: Danila Kozlovsky; Andrey Zolotarev; Sergey Chetverukhin
- Produced by: Danila Kozlovsky; Petr Anurov; Leonid Vereshchagin; Nikita Mikhalkov; Anton Zlatopolskiy
- Starring: Danila Kozlovsky; Olya Zueva; Irina Gorbacheva; Vladimir Ilyin; Andrey Smolyakov; Viktor Verzhbitsky; Dmitri Sychev; Alan Gatagov; Mariya Lobanova; Aleksandr Ilyin Jr.
- Cinematography: Fedor Lyass
- Edited by: Mariya Likhachyova
- Music by: Oleg Karpachev
- Production companies: Kinoslovo; TriTe Studios; DK Entertainment; Cinema Foundation; Russia-1; Mosfilm
- Distributed by: Central Partnership
- Release date: April 19, 2018 (Russia)
- Running time: 138 minutes
- Country: Russia
- Language: Russian
- Budget: ₽390 million $.290.349
- Box office: ₽900.655.221 $13.821.095

Coach (Russian: Тренер, romanized: Trener) is a 2018 Russian sports drama film co-written, directed by, and starring Danila Kozlovsky. Kozlovsky's debut project, where in addition to the usual main role, he took on the role of director for the first time. A football drama about the star striker of the national team, who, after a loud failure, leaves the big sport. But he is not able to renounce his vacation and becomes the coach of an unknown team. While teaching it the art of defeating opponents, the hero himself learns to conquer his internal breakdowns.

== Plot ==
During the crucial qualifying match for the World Cup against the Romanian team, Yuri Stoleshnikov, the captain of the Russian team, fails to score a penalty in the last minutes of the game. Following this, he aggressively tackles an opponent, shouts at the referee, and ultimately receives a red card. As he leaves the field, he instigates a fight with the spectators. As a result, the national team loses 0-1, and Stoleshnikov is handed a one-year suspension. He also decides to leave his club, Spartak, and ultimately chooses to retire from his career as a player.

Two years pass by, and Stoleshnikov still hasn't found a job. Unexpectedly, he is offered the position of head coach for the Meteor team from Novorossiysk, which plays in the second strongest league of the Russian championship. Stoleshnikov agrees and meets with the president of Meteor, Larisa Volskaya, who is also the mayor's daughter. Larisa informs him that the club has just sold two leading football players due to financial difficulties. Yuri becomes furious and, after cooling down a bit, asks why he was chosen as the coach among other candidates. Larisa tells Yuri that he is in such a desperate situation: "You are written off and nothing is expected of you," and it is exactly such people who can work miracles - win and prevent a shopping center from being built on the site of the Meteor stadium in the near future. In the team, Yuri encounters the same attitudes - players have gained extra weight, show up to training sessions hungover, and are only interested in their salaries and bonuses. Stoleshnikov decides to fight against these attitudes by making the players train while wrapping their bodies in plastic wrap. He is reprimanded by the coach of the club's youth team, Berger, who claims that it puts a heavy strain on the heart. The team's rehabilitation doctor, Varya, criticizes Stoleshnikov for causing the athletes to suffer too many injuries as a result.

In the first match under Stoleshnikov's leadership (the 9th round of the league against Tambov), the team loses 0-2, but after the game, Meteor players are celebrating in the locker room. In the next match (the 14th round of the league against Shinnik), Yuri sees his players openly "throwing" the game. He replaces the saboteurs and sends the inexperienced but talented forward Zuev onto the field, but the senior players dampen the rookie's enthusiasm; Meteor loses 0-2. At the next training session, Yuri comes drunk and laughs at one of the footballers who placed a bet against his own team under his own name. Yuri leaves the stadium, Varia catches up with him, and they drink together in a cafe. In the morning, Yuri wakes up in Varia's apartment, talks to her sister Dasha, and they quickly become friends.

Stoleshnikov comes to a mutual agreement with the team, wherein he agrees not to intervene in their activities. Instead, he opts to observe their training sessions from the stands. However, this agreement comes with two crucial conditions that must be strictly adhered to: firstly, the individuals present at the stadium are prohibited from consuming any alcoholic beverages. Secondly, they must refrain from making any physical contact with the ball. Failure to comply with the latter condition will result in a hefty fine of 1000 rubles. Yuri extends an invitation to Berger, proposing him to take on the role of his assistant. It's worth mentioning that a significant portion of the Meteor players are actually students of Yuri. Intrigued by the opportunity, Berger accepts the offer without hesitation. Eager to drum up even more support for the team, Yuri decides to pay a visit to the local bar frequented by devoted Meteor fans. With utmost conviction and charm, he manages to successfully persuade the passionate supporters to rally behind their beloved team. During the upcoming training session, a group of passionate fans arrived and expressed their disappointment towards the players, accusing them of being disinterested. Overwhelmed by the fans' reproach, the players struggled to tolerate the criticism and instead resorted to playing with the ball as a means of venting their frustrations. Even the looming threat of facing penalties for disregarding the coach's instructions failed to deter them from their impulsive actions. The fans seemed appeased by this unexpected display of enthusiasm from the players. In the privacy of the locker room, Yuri, the team's mentor, took the opportunity to gather the players and address the underlying issue at hand. He candidly explained that their chances of achieving success in the championship were slim, dampening their spirits. However, Yuri encouraged them to redirect their focus towards the Russian Cup, emphasizing that this tournament presented a fresh opportunity for them to showcase their skills and possibly achieve a sense of triumph.

In the 1/32 finals of the Russian Cup, Meteor defeats Avangard with a score of 1-0. After the match, Yuri learns that due to the club's debts, they have been deprived of the transfer window, and they will not be able to strengthen the team. He talks to the mayor, who states that he will not allow the budget funds and investments of local enterprises to be spent on football, which is not needed by anyone here. The team has become a burden on the city budget (costing 200 million rubles per year) and no one will object if Meteor falls back to the lower league again. Yuri travels to Moscow to see his father and asks him to come to Novorossiysk. His father suggests that Yuri go out on the field himself, but he responds that he has finally become a coach.

In the quarterfinals of the Russian Cup, the team Meteor faces off against Torpedo, which is known for its management bribing the referee. The referees actively show bias towards the opponent, despite Berger also bribing them at Larisa's request, so that they would judge fairly. The referee claims that the decision to not let Meteor proceed further was made "upstairs", but he can return the money. However, Meteor triumphs (2:1). After the game, Yuri tries to discipline Zuev, but Varya stands up for him, and Yuri interrupts her angry tirade with a kiss. A night of love follows.

Yuri is surprised when he receives a phone call from Moscow, bringing him the news that his father has died. Following the news, Yuri decides to travel to the Russian capital in order to attend his's father funeral and support to his family.

In the semifinals, Meteor wins against Fakel with a 1-0 score in the very last minute of the game. As the crowd erupts, a banner unfurls across the stands, stretching out to reveal a message that reads, "Yura, we stand by your side!" Accompanied by this sentiment is a portrait of Stoleshnikov's father. Yuri, the talented player, is moved to tears upon witnessing this display of support from the stands.

After a short period of time, Yuri is invited to coach Spartak. In Novorossiysk, everyone is upset, although they understand and accept this choice. Varya refuses to go to Moscow with Yuri. Stoleshnikov flies to the capital; in his father's apartment, he sees a hanging Meteor football shirt on the wall. He returns to Novorossiysk, and Varya forgives him. Eventually, Berger officially becomes the team's coach, and Yuri signs a contract as a free agent, which he became after the end of his disqualification period.

During the highly anticipated final of the Russian Cup held in Krasnodar, two formidable teams, Meteor and Spartak, clashed on the field. Unfortunately, after the first half, Meteor found themselves trailing behind with a score of 0:2. However, amidst this disappointing setback, a controversial incident occurred when Stoleshnikov managed to score a goal that was unjustly disallowed by the referees. As the halftime whistle blew, Larissa, a passionate supporter of the Meteor team, confronted the head referee, threatening to jeopardize his professional career if he continued to exhibit biased decisions that negatively impacted her beloved team. Undeterred by her fervent outburst, the second half commenced, with Stoleshnikov once again playing a significant role. This time, he earned a well-deserved penalty for his team, signaling a glimmer of hope for a potential comeback. However, fate had a different plan, as Stoleshnikov unfortunately sustained an injury during the penalty kick, rendering him unable to convert the opportunity himself. The game reaches a point where the score becomes 1:2, however, Stoleshnikov finds himself unable to continue playing. As the match approaches its conclusion, Stoleshnikov substitutes Zuev into the game, but Zuev feels completely bewildered. In a desperate attempt to inspire Zuev, Yuri rallies the fans and they start chanting Zuev's name. Miraculously, Zuev regains his focus and manages to equalize the score, making it 2:2. And just when it seems like all hope is lost, Zuev showcases his brilliance by executing a perfect heel pass to a teammate, resulting in the winning goal and a score of 3:2. In the last minute of added time, Spartak's player takes a dangerous free kick, but Meteor's goalkeeper skillfully saves the ball. The referee blows the whistle, confirming Meteor's victory, and the euphoric fans erupt in cheers.

The final scene takes place at Stamford Bridge stadium in London, during a match in the Europa League. The teams that step onto the field are Chelsea and Meteor.

== Cast ==
- Danila Kozlovsky as Yuri Stoleshnikov, football player and coach of the team "Meteor"
- Olya Zueva as Varya, rehabilitologist of the Meteor
- Mariya Lobanova as Dasha, Varya's sister
- Irina Gorbacheva as Larisa "Lara" Volskaya, president of the Meteor
- Rostislav Bershauer as Semyon Smolin, director of the Meteor
- Vladimir Ilyin as Adolf Berger, football coach
- Andrey Smolyakov as Stoleshnikov's father
- Viktor Verzhbitsky as Vladimir, mayor of Novorossiysk, Larisa's father
- Pavel Vorozhtsov as Valdis
- Igor Gordin as president of FC Spartak Moscow
- Aleksandr Ilyin Jr. as bartender, gets fans of the Meteor
- Aleksandr Oblossov as Vitya, trainer
- Dmitriy Chebotaryov as Igor Masikov (Masyanya), captain of the Meteor
- Askar Ilyasov as Rafael Khamitzhanov (Raf)
- Dmitri Sychev as Dodin, football player of the team "Meteor"
- Vitaliy Andreev as Zuev
- Sergey Shatalov as Melnikov
- Nikolay Samsonov as Varennikov
- Alan Gatagov as Petrovsky
- Vladislav Khatazhyonkov as Zorky
- Denis Pirozhkov as physician of the Meteor
- Yevgeny Savin as Anurov, captain of the Spartak
- Georgy Cherdantsev as cameo
- Konstantin Genich as cameo
- Yura Borisov as fan of the Russia National team

== Production ==
=== Development ===
This film is the directorial and screenwriting debut of Danila Kozlovsky.

According to Kozlovsky, he had long dreamed of the role of a football coach. At the initial stage of his work, he considered his participation in the project only as an actor and producer, but then he realized that he would like to “tell this story himself” - as a director. At the dawn of his career, in 2005, Kozlovsky played the role of footballer Nikolai in the film Garpastum (2005) directed by Aleksei German Jr. The plot of the picture tells about football in Tsarist Russia.

All the workers of the set were dressed in the branded jackets of the Meteor team. If the camera captured one of them when shooting, that person fit into the frame as an employee of the club.

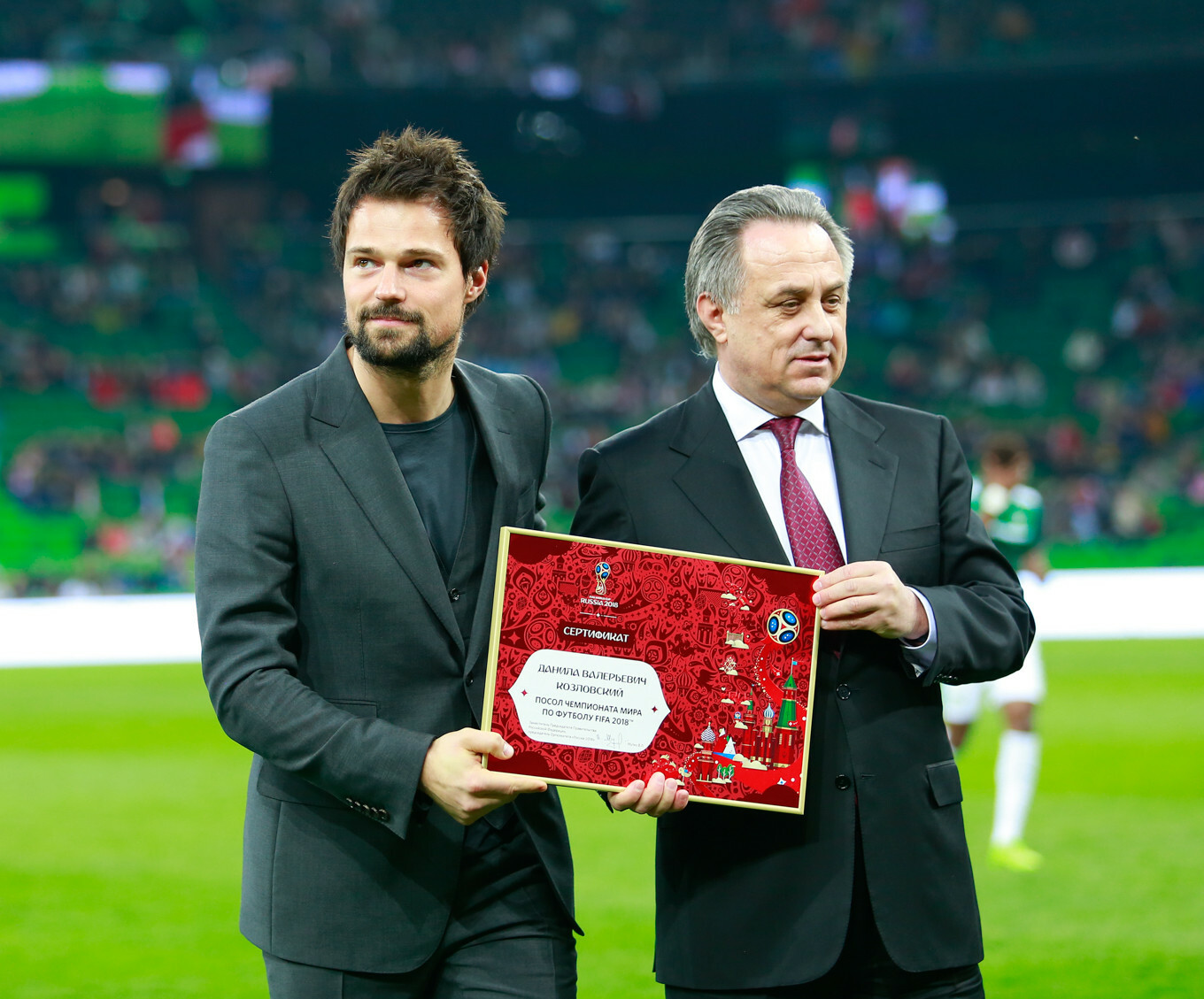
Danila Kozlovsky and Vitaly Mutko of the World Cup, «I read many books about football, including those written by legendary coaches and football players. I talked a lot with coaches, referees, players, managers, commentators, doctors... I constantly watch football, study goals, fouls, red cards, scandals. I follow the Champions League, I know all the modern players. I signed up for all the football posts on Instagram. I even began to dress like a football player: I suddenly discovered six pairs of sneakers... I like this culture. Of course, there are circumstances in modern football that I do not welcome, but there are a huge number of things that I like, and I try to integrate them as much as possible into the film’s fabric».

The project was created with the support of the Ministry of Sport of the Russian Federation, the Russian Football Union and personally Vitaly Mutko. Also the film received financial support from the Cinema Foundation of Russia.

About three thousand professional football players auditioned for a role in the picture, from whom the creators of the project selected about 200 people. Among them were Alan Gatagov and Dmitri Sychev; the latter compared Kozlovsky with Guus Hiddink based on the results of the shooting, who combining exactingness and democracy, managed to lead the national team to bronze medals of Euro 2008. For two months, the team, assembled from athletes and professional actors, lived on a tough athletic regimen. Kozlovsky trained with them too.

=== Casting ===
Olya Zueva, who worked with Kozlovsky in the 2018 film In the Hood, initially asked for the role of Varya, but Kozlovsky felt that she did not fit in the style and image, and continued to look for another performer. Meanwhile, Zueva reworked the script, giving the character of her character more strength, courage and a bit of eccentricity. The director positively evaluated the proposals and approved the actress for the role.

=== Filming ===
Principal photography process continued in 2017. The training base of FC "Meteor" was shot at the Central Stadium of Novorossiysk - the home arena of FC Chernomorets Novorossiysk. In total, six football stadiums were used in the film, including "Lukoil Arena", "Arena Khimki" and "Krasnodar Stadium".

The only foreign stadium used in the movie is Stamford Bridge, the home stadium of Chelsea.

Filming was carried out in the evening and at night - from 17 to 7 hours. In extras - in the roles of fans - about 450 people were shot.

== Release ==
The film was released in the Russian Federation on April 19, 2018 by Central Partnership.

== Reception ==
According to the calculations of the magazine "StarHit", the cost of the crowd scenes amounted to about 5 million rubles. The production budget of the film is 390 million rubles, the projected gross - 680 million rubles.

=== Critical response ===
The film received average ratings of Russian film critics. Browser Anton Dolin (ru) rated the film 6 points out of 10.

== See also ==
- Legend № 17 (2013 film)
- Going Vertical (2017 film)
