= Gomelsky =

Gomelsky (feminine: Gomelskaya) is an habitational surname, meaning "a person from the city of Gomel", in Belarus. Notable people with the surname include:

- Alexander Gomelsky (1928–2005), Russian professional basketball player and coach
- Almendra Gomelsky (born 1968), Argentine-born TV presenter, model and designer
- Evgeny Gomelsky (born 1938), Russian former professional basketball player and coach
- Giorgio Gomelsky (1934–2016), Georgian-born film maker, impresario, music manager, songwriter (as Oscar Rasputin) and record producer
- Julia Gomelskaya (1964–2016), Ukrainian composer
- Vladimir Gomelsky (born 1953), Russian TV commentator, journalist, and writer

== See also ==
- Alexander Gomelsky Universal Sports Hall CSKA, multi-purpose indoor sporting arena in Moscow, Russia
- Gomelsky Cup, annual basketball tournament held in Moscow in the autumn
- Gomelsky Uyezd, one of the subdivisions of the Mogilev Governorate of the Russian Empire
- Gomilsko
