= Aleksandr Shmurnov =

Russian sports journalist (born 1966)

Alexander Shmurnov
- Алекса́ндр Ива́нович Шмурно́в
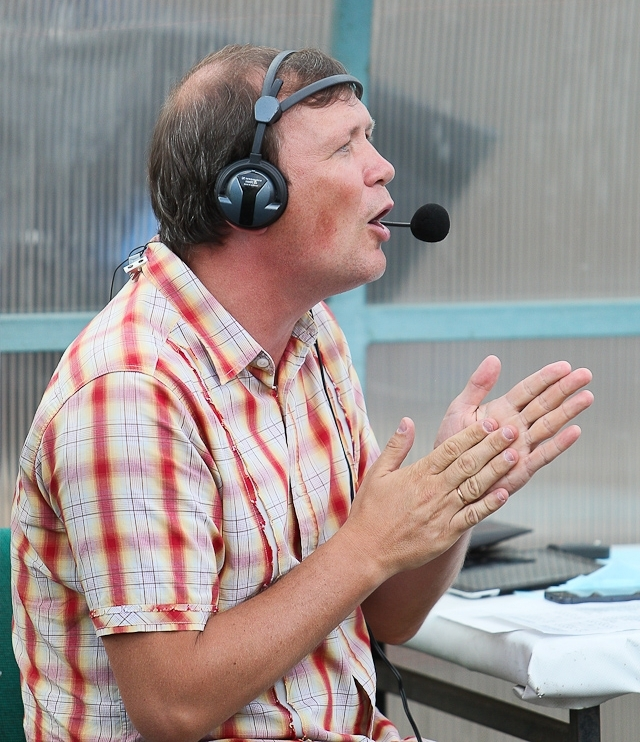
- Born: 8 December 1966 (age 59); Moscow, Russian SFSR

Alexander Ivanovich Shmurnov (born December 8, 1966; Moscow, RSFSR, USSR) is a Russian sports journalist, radio host, television commentator, who worked for the Russian Match TV channel until 2022. Former chief editor of a sports Internet portal Championat.com. Creator and author of the YouTube channel “Shmurnov Time”

== Biography ==
Ivanovich was born on December 8, 1966, in Moscow. He graduated from the French special school No. 18 (currently 1275), then the Moscow Aviation Institute. He has worked in sports journalism since 1992.

In 1992–1993 he was the editor and host of a sports broadcast on the radio station Business Wave. In 1993–2001 he was the author, columnist, and editor of the international department of the weekly Football, in 1995 he was one of the leading software Football Review on Ostankino Channel. In 1994, he was among the first journalists of NTV sports editorial. Getting up before a choice, continued to work in the Football, which until then was anxious to get there. In 2001–2009 years – the browser, then the chief of the sports newspaper Gazeta. In 2009–2010, the publisher of the Encyclopedia of World Football. From 2011 to 2014 – chief editor of the sports internet portal Championat.com.

Since 2003 to 2015, he was the commentator of TV Company NTV Plus. Basically commented football games. In 2003–2004 he led the author's program of fan organizations Evrofanklub of NTV Plus Football. Also I worked for many years on the channel Tennis, covered all the Grand Slam tournaments, the matches of the Davis Cup and Fed Cup. He worked as a commentator for cycling at the Olympic Games in 2008. Spent the last editions of the football talk show 90 minutes+ instead of Georgy Cherdantsev. The main tool for TV commentator considers relevant and emotional reaction to the actions of the players. In particular, he said:

There are four whales TV coverage — the truth, emotion, thought and sound.

Since November 2015 worked as a commentator of football, as well as the leading documentary series Everything for Euro! and the UEFA Europa League on TV viewing Match TV. Since March 2016 leads a program overview 8–16 on the TV channel Nash Football.

He left Match Tv in February 2022. In autumn of 2023, he founded a channel on Youtube called “Shmurnov Time”, in which he covers the events of European and world football for a Russian-speaking audience.

Alexander Shmurnov is married and has three children. He is a fluent in French and Spanish.

On March 28, 2025, the Russian Justice Ministry added Shmurnov to its list of "foreign agents".
