= Sofya Tartakova =

Russian sports journalist (born 1989)

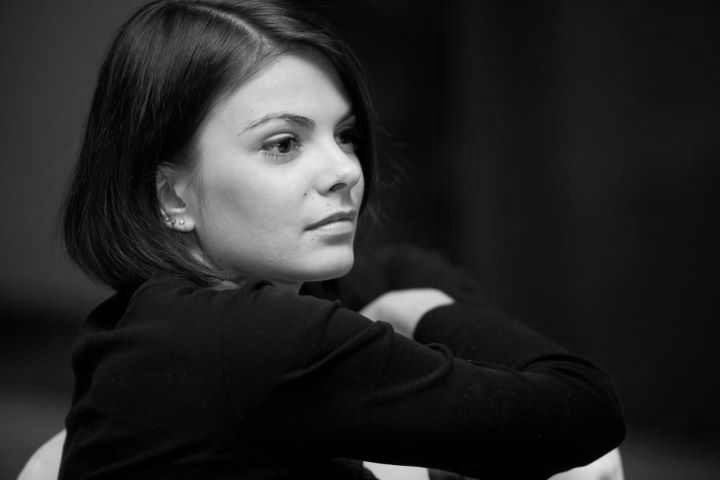
- Born: Sofya Andreyevna Tartakova; 17 June 1989 (age 37); Moscow
- Citizenship: Moscow
- Occupation: sports journalist
- Spouse: Stepan Khotulev
- Writing career
- Years active: 2009–present

Sofya Andreyevna Tartakova (Russian: Со́фья Андре́евна Тартако́ва; born 17 June 1989, Moscow) is a Russian radio and TV presenter, journalist and sports commentator of Match TV.

== Biography ==
In autumn of 2009 she worked as a correspondent in the newspaper Sovetsky Sport, wrote articles on the topic of tennis.

In 2011 she graduated from the Humanities Institute of Television and Radio Broadcasting. She was the commentator of tennis matches on channels Eurosport Russia and NTV Plus Tennis, and the author and presenter of program Central Court on the radio station Sport FM.

For the first time as a TV presenter, Sofya Tartakova appeared in February 2014 in the program Olympic Channel from Sochi on the TV channel Sport Plus as co-host with Georgy Cherdantsev. She commented on the Wimbledon tennis tournament in 2014 on the Internet portal Sports.ru.

She was formerly a press attache with the Russian Tennis Federation.

In October 2015, she moved to the new sports TV channel Match TV.

In May 2017, she starred for the men's Maxim Magazine along with colleagues from Match TV Maria Bass and Yulia Sharapova. In June 2018 Tartakova graced the issue of the Russian edition of Playboy.

She is married to Russian tennis player Stepan Khotulev.
