= Gennady Nazarov =

Soviet and Russian actor (1967-2025)

- Born: Gennady Gennadievich Nazarov; 3 March 1967; Moscow, Russian SFSR, USSR
- Died: 26 October 2025 (aged 58)
- Occupation: Actor
- Years active: 1994–2025
- Spouse: Natalya Nazarova

Gennady Gennadievich Nazarov (Russian: Геннадий Геннадьевич Назаров; 3 March 1967 – 26 October 2025) was a Soviet and Russian actor.

== Life and career ==
Nazarov graduated from the faculty of the Moscow theatrical fake artistic and technical school. Sovremennik Theatre worked as a graphic designer in the theater. He graduated from the acting department GITIS led by Mark Zakharov. He played a large number of roles in theater.

He debuted in 1994 in the role of Ivan Chonkin in the film Life and Extraordinary Adventures of Private Ivan Chonkin.

A large number of the roles were played by Gennady Nazarov on television.

Nazarov suffered from a serious kidney disease. He died on 26 October 2025, at the age of 58. His wife film director Natalya had died of cancer six months before his death.

== Selected filmography ==
- Life and Extraordinary Adventures of Private Ivan Chonkin (1994) as Ivan Chonkin
- Assia and the Hen with the Golden Eggs (1994) as Seryozha
- Thief (1995) as Oleg, lawyer
- What a Wonderful Game (1995) as Kolya Rybkin
- Heads and Tails (1995) as Vadik
- Barkhanov and His Bodyguard (1996) as Lyonya
- From Hell to Hell (1997) as Andrzej Sikorski
- Cops and Robbers (1997) as taxi driver
- Composition for Victory Day (1998) as Vova
- 72 Meters (2007) as miner
- Gagarin's Grandson (2007) as Fyodor Vnukov, lonely painter
- Red Fountains (2011) as dad

== Awards and nominations ==
- Czech Lions (1995): Best Actor (Life and Extraordinary Adventures of Private Ivan Chonkin) — nomination
- Nika Awards (1996): Best Actor (What a Wonderful Game) — nomination
