= Alexander Yelagin =

Russian sports commentator

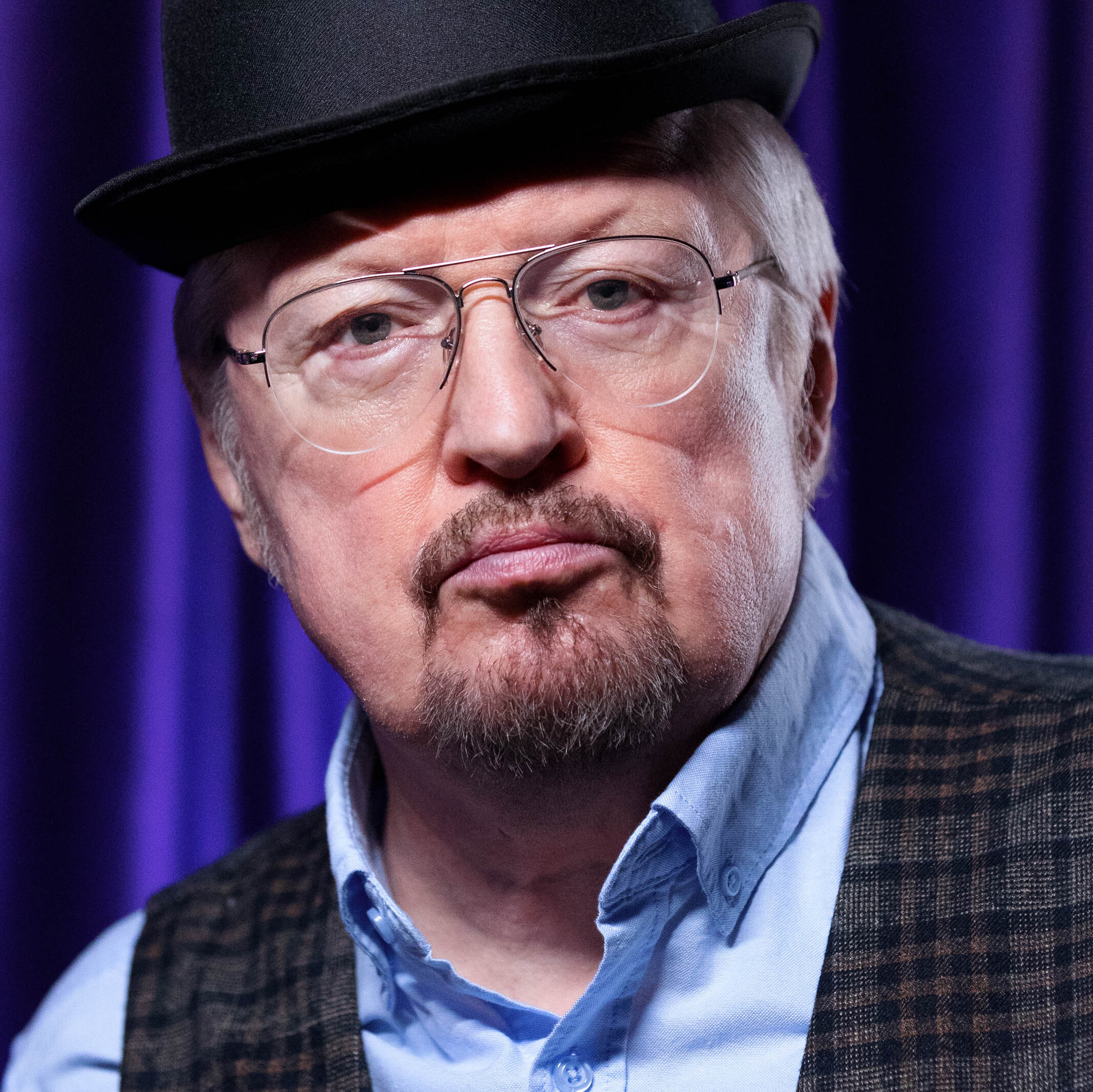
- Born: Alexander Viktorovich Masalov; 2 August 1953 (age 73)
- Citizenship: Soviet Union → Russia
- Occupations: Sports commentator, television presenter, actor
- Awards: Merited Artist of the Russian Federation (2004)

Alexander Viktorovich Masalov, known professionally as Alexander Yelagin (Russian: Александр Викторович Масалов (Елагин); born 2 August 1953), is a Russian sports commentator, television presenter and actor. He was awarded the title of Merited Artist of the Russian Federation in 2004.

== Early life and education ==
Masalov was born in 1953. He adopted the name Yelagin, his mother's maiden name, for his work in the media.

He began acting in 1975 at the Theater MOST, then directed by Roman Viktyuk. In 1976, Viktyuk invited him to play the leading role in the television play My Friend Mozart, alongside Margarita Terekhova, Leonid Markov, Alexander Lenkov and others. In 1983, he appeared in Mark Rozovsky's studio production Triptych with Alexander Filippenko.

Yelagin graduated from the international department of the MSU Faculty of Journalism in 1982. He later worked at Goznak and in Czechoslovakia through the Soviet Society for Friendship with Foreign Countries. At Moscow State University he was a classmate of Vladislav Listyev.

After returning from Czechoslovakia, he joined the Theatre "U Nikitskikh vorot", where he has worked, with interruptions, since 1989.

== Broadcasting career ==
In the 1990s, Yelagin worked for the Russian television channel 2x2 as an editor and presenter of sports news. He also wrote advertising copy for Echo of Moscow, where he met sports producer Yevgeny Lyubimov, who invited him to join the newly created REN TV.

From 1996 to 2003, Yelagin worked in REN TV's sports department. He worked on the programmes Football Courier and Gillette Sport, and commentated on matches of the Premier League and the Russian football championship. His final position at the channel was head of the football review programme Saturn-REN TV. Football News.

At the same time, from 1997 to 1999, he commentated on sports news for TV Tsentr under the name Alexander Masalov. In 1999, he received the Golden Microphone award as the year's best football television commentator.

From 2002 to 2009, Yelagin worked as a sports commentator for 7TV, where he commentated on Premier League broadcasts and the FA Cup. In 2004–2005, he also occasionally appeared on Channel One Russia football broadcasts, mainly as a reserve commentator when the main commentary feed was unavailable. In 2006, he briefly hosted Letopis sporta on the Sport channel.

In September 2009, after 7TV discontinued sports broadcasting, Yelagin moved to NTV Plus at the invitation of Anna Dmitrieva and Vasily Utkin. From 2009 to 2015, he commentated on football for the company's sports channels and regularly appeared in European football review programmes on NTV.

Yelagin is the author of the reference book The History of the UEFA European Football Championship: 1960–2004, published by Olympia-Press.

In November 2015, he joined Match TV as a football commentator. In January 2016, he and several other commentators, including Vasily Utkin, Kirill Dementyev and Aleksey Andronov, were moved from staff positions to freelance contracts, but Yelagin continued to work with the channel. He briefly left the channel in 2017 as part of staff reductions.

Since March 2016, Yelagin has also worked as a football commentator for Eurosport 1. From July 2017 to 28 July 2022, he hosted the YouTube programme British Style with Alexander Yelagin.

He commentated on the 2018 FIFA World Cup for Channel One Russia. In August 2018, he returned to regular work for Match TV and the Match subholding's thematic channels.

In June 2019, at the initiative of Vladimir Stognienko, Yelagin joined Okko Sport, part of Rambler Group, where he commentated on Premier League matches. He continued to work on other competitions for Match channels.

Since 2022, he has been a regular participant in the YouTube project Komment.Show, where he discusses English football with Alexander Netsenko, Denis Kazansky and Denis Kachanov.

== Personal life ==
Yelagin is widowed; his wife died in 2013. He has a daughter and a son. He speaks Swedish, Czech and English to varying degrees.

== Filmography ==
Year	Title	Original title	Role
1994	Life and Extraordinary Adventures of Private Ivan Chonkin	Život a neobyčejná dobrodružství vojáka Ivana Čonkina	Malakhov
2008	Blazhennaya	Блаженная	Lawyer
2010	We Declare War on You	Мы объявляем вам войну	Bartender

== Awards ==
- Medal "For Works in Culture and Art" (11 April 2024), for a major contribution to Russian culture and art and many years of work.
- Merited Artist of the Russian Federation (10 March 2004), for services to the arts.
