= The Bookmaker Ratings =

Website

- Type: Daily sports newspaper
- Format: Analytical website
- Owner: Paruyr Shahbazyan
- Editor-in-chief: Bradley Gibbs
- Founded: 1 March 2012
- Language: English, Armenian, Bulgarian, Russian, Serbian, Spanish, Ukrainian,
- Website: bookmaker-ratings.com

Bookmaker Ratings is an online publication covering topics related to sports betting and disputes between players and bookmakers. It is published in seven languages: English, Armenian, Bulgarian, Russian, Serbian, Spanish and Ukrainian.

== History and activity ==
The Bookmaker Ratings was founded by Paruyr Shahbazyan in 2012. Later that year, the site made headlines after being informed of a possible match-fixing incident in the Russian National Football League between FC Khimki and Petrotrest St. Petersburg, and UEFA asked them to investigate.

The website publishes betting tips for various sports written by the site's authors who range from journalists to ex-players. These authors include commentator Konstantin Genich, former world number 5 tennis player Anna Chakvetadze, football manager of the Russian national team Valeri Karpin, and Russian football coach and a former player Yegor Titov. Other experts in the past have included football World Cup winner Fabio Cannavaro and former heavyweight boxing champion Nikolai Valuev. According to a 2015 interview of Shahbazyan for Forbes, Bookmaker Ratings averaged 1.2 million hits a month, 350,000 of which were unique visitors. The site uses an independent rating system where bookmakers are ranked from 1 to 5 on several criteria.

The site was able to refund more than 1.4m US dollars to players in their first four years of existence.

== RB Prize ==
In 2018, the Bookmaker Rating introduced the RB Prize, an international award in the field of sports and bookmaking. The awards are presented in 28 categories.

In 2021, the main nominations in the award were announced by football player Luis Figo, Fonbet became the bookmaker of the year, Artem Dziuba became the sportsman of the year.

In 2022, the RB Prize was held at the Irina Viner-Usmanova Gymnastics Palace, Fonbet became the bookmaker of the year for the second year in a row, Dina Averin's athlete of the year, Emmanuel Adebayor announced the main nominations.

== Honours ==
- 2015 and 2016 Betting Award as the Best internet portal about sports betting
- 2018 Runet Prize in the Media and entertainment category
