= Gagarin's Grandson =

- Russian: Внук Гагарина
- Directed by: Andrey Panin; Tamara Vladimirtseva
- Written by: Eduard Topol; Yuliya Topol
- Produced by: Sergey Danielyan; Ruben Dishdishyan
- Starring: Done Lema; Gennady Nazarov; Andrey Panin; Anastasiya Richi; Natalya Rogozhkina; Svetlana Skurikhina
- Cinematography: Artur Gimpel
- Edited by: Igor Litoninskiy
- Release date: 2007
- Country: Russia
- Language: Russian

Gagarin's Grandson (Russian: Внук Гагарина) is a 2007 Russian comedy film directed by Tamara Vladimirtseva and Andrey Panin.

== Plot ==
The film tells about the dark-skinned pupil Gena Gagarin, whom the artist Fyodor takes to his family. They have a hard way to learn to understand each other.

== Cast ==
- Done Lema as Gena
- Gennady Nazarov as Fyodor
- Andrey Panin as Tolyan
- Anastasiya Richi
- Natalya Rogozhkina as Greta
- Svetlana Skurikhina
- Elya Akmaeva
- Stella Baranovskaya as Girl with a foreign car
- Dmitriy Georgrievskiy
- Anna Gromova
