= Moscow 2042 =

Book by Vladimir Vojnovitsj

- 1st English edition (1987)
- Author: Vladimir Voinovich
- Original title: Москва 2042
- Language: Russian
- Genre: Political, dystopian, satirical
- Publisher: Harcourt Brace Jovanovich (English 1st ed.)
- Publication date: 1986
- Publication place: Soviet Union
- English publication date: 1987
- Media type: Print (Hardcover, Paperback)
- Pages: 424
- ISBN: 0-15-162444-5
- OCLC: 14932938
- Dewey Decimal: 891.73/44 19
- LC Class: PG3489.4.I53 M6513 1987

Moscow 2042 (Russian: Москва́ 2042, Moskva 2042) is a 1986 satirical novel (translated into English from Russian in 1987) by Vladimir Voinovich. In this book, the alter ego of the author travels to the future, where he sees how communism has been successfully built in the single city of Moscow. It soon becomes clear that the political system in the country is not a utopia and that Russia is ruled by the "Communist Party of State Security" which combines the KGB, the Communist Party, and the Russian Orthodox Church.

The party is led by former KGB general Bukashev, who had met previously with the main character of the novel in Germany. An extreme slavophile Sim Karnavalov (apparently a parody of Aleksandr Solzhenitsyn) enters Moscow on a white horse as the savior.

Voinovich wrote this book in 1982.

== Plot summary ==
The Russian author Kartsev, living in Munich in 1982 (just like Voinovich himself), time travels to the Moscow of 2042. After the "Great August Revolution", the new leader referred to as "Genialissimus" has changed the Soviet Union... up to a certain point. After Vladimir Lenin's dream of the world revolution narrowed down to Joseph Stalin's theory of "Socialism in one country", Genialissimus has decided to start from building "Communism in one city", namely in Moscow.

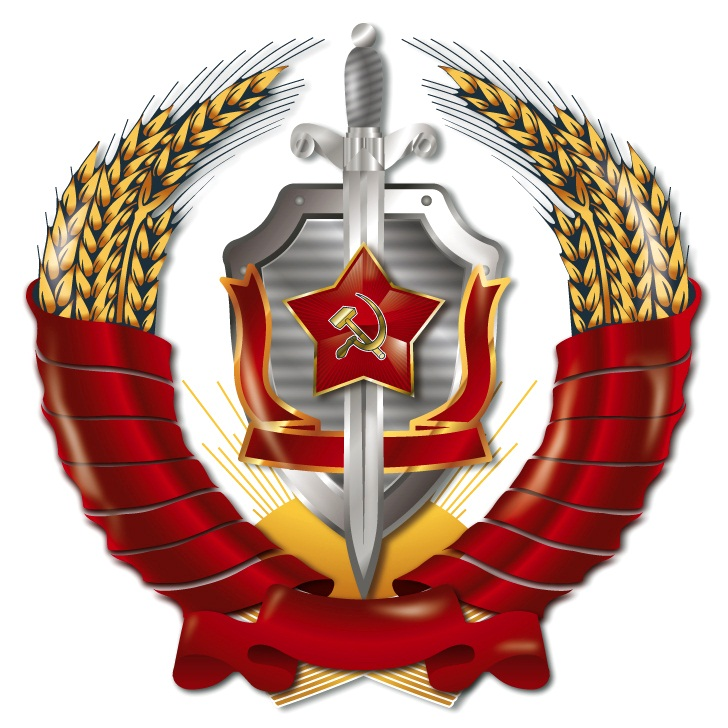
CPGB – The Communist party of state security (a combined Emblem of the USSR and the KGB)

The ideology has changed somewhat, into a hodgepodge of Marxism–Leninism and Russian Orthodoxy (the Genialissimus is also Patriarch). The country is ruled by the CPGB – The Communist Party of State Security, a merger of the Communist Party and the KGB. The decay from which the Soviet Union suffered has worsened.

The rest of the Soviet Union, where people barely survive, has been separated by a Berlin type of wall from the "paradise" of Moscow, where communism has been realized. Within the wall everyone gets everything by the communist principle, "according to his needs", though their needs are not decided by themselves, but by the Genialissimus. Most people have "ordinary needs", but a chosen few have "extraordinary needs". For the first-mentioned group, life is dismal even within the privileged "Moscorep" (Moscow Communist Republic).

The situation finally gets so desperate that people throw themselves in the arms of the "liberator", a dissident writer and acquaintance of Kartsev, the slavophile Sim Karnavalov (an apparent mockery of Aleksandr Solzhenitsyn), who enters Moscow on a white horse and proclaims himself Tsar Serafim the First. Thus, communism is abandoned and society digresses back into feudal autocracy.

== Reception ==
This novel is considered to be a masterpiece of dystopian satire. Some (including Voinovich) have called the novel prophetic.

== See also ==
- The Life and Extraordinary Adventures of Private Ivan Chonkin
