= Vladimir Voinovich =

Russian writer and Soviet dissident (1932–2018)

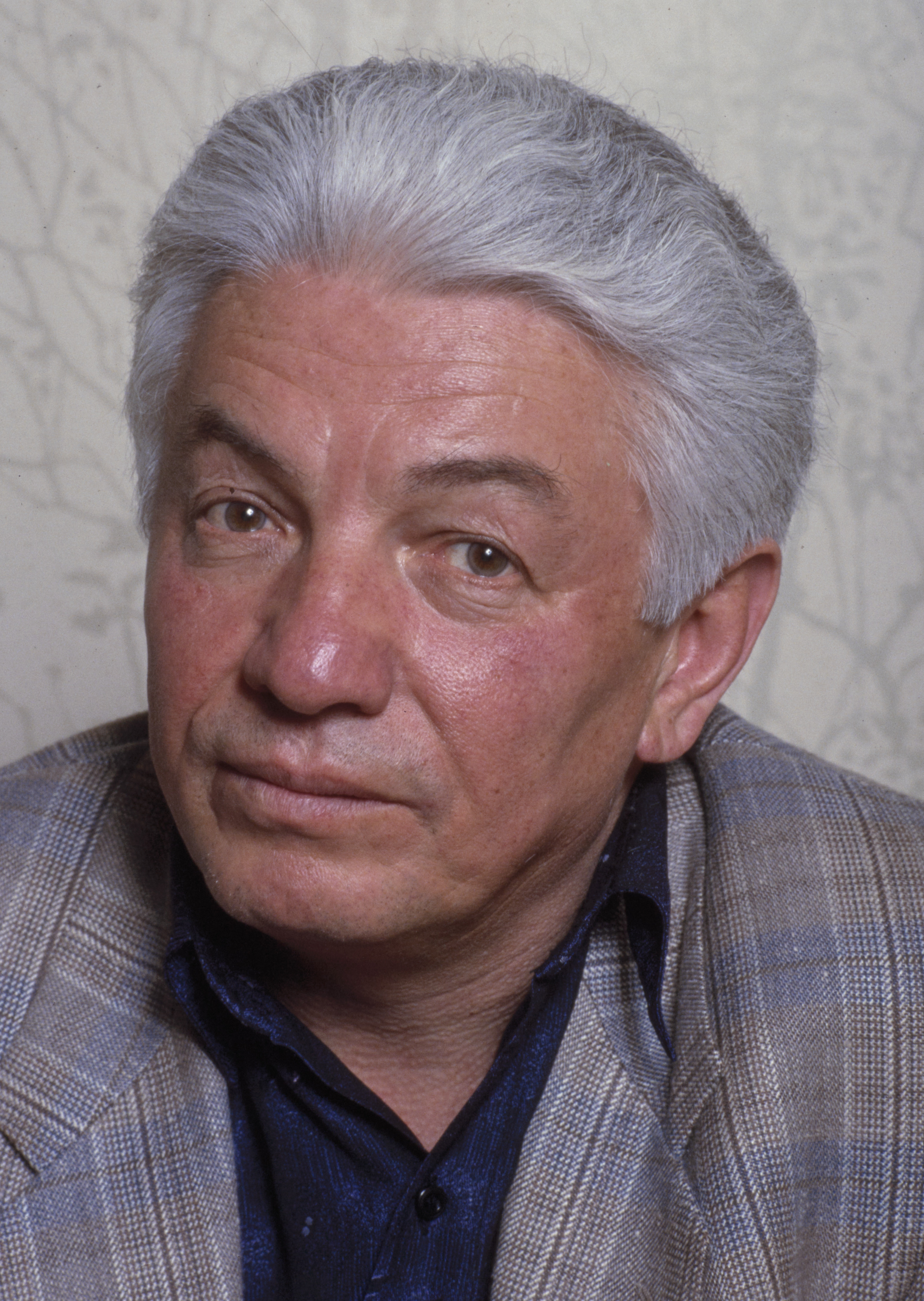
- Voinovich in 1986
- Born: 26 September 1932; Stalinabad, Tajik SSR, Soviet Union
- Died: 27 July 2018 (aged 85); Moscow, Russia
- Resting place: Troyekurovskoye Cemetery
- Occupation: Writer
- Years active: 1960–2018
- Notable work: The Life and Extraordinary Adventures of Private Ivan Chonkin (1969–2007); Moscow 2042 (1986); Monumental Propaganda (2000)
- Awards: Andrei Sakharov Prize For Writer's Civic Courage, State Prize of the Russian Federation
- Voinovich's voice Recorded 14 December 2013 during an interview for Ekho Moskvy

Vladimir Nikolayevich Voinovich (Russian: Влади́мир Никола́евич Войно́вич; 26 September 1932 – 27 July 2018) was a Russian writer and former Soviet dissident, and the "first genuine comic writer" produced by the Soviet system. Among his most well-known works are the satirical epic The Life and Extraordinary Adventures of Private Ivan Chonkin and the dystopian Moscow 2042. He was forced into exile and stripped of his citizenship by Soviet authorities in 1980 but later rehabilitated and moved back to Moscow in 1990. After the fall of the Soviet Union, he continued to be an outspoken critic of Russian politics under the rule of Vladimir Putin.

== Biography ==
=== Early life ===
Voinovich was born in Stalinabad, Tajik SSR, Soviet Union. According to himself, his father was of Serbian descent and a translator of Serbian literature, and his mother was of Jewish descent. Vladimir Voinovich claimed that his father belonged to the Serbian Vojnović noble family, although this is solely based on his surname and the book by the Yugoslavian writer Vidak Vujnovic Vojinovici i Vujinovici od srednjeg veka do danas (1985) which he received as a gift from the author during his stay in Germany.

In 1936 Voinovich's father was arrested on the allegation of anti-Soviet agitation and spent five years in labor camps.

Voinovich began his studies in Moscow and tried to enter the Maxim Gorky Literature Institute. After a failed attempt he entered the Moscow Krupskaya Pedagogical Institute, the faculty of history. According to his autobiography, he spent some time in Kazakhstan, "seeking inspiration", and on his return to Moscow started working on his first novel.

=== Literary debut and dissidence ===
His earliest published books were We Live Here and I Want To Be Honest. In 1969 he published the first part of The Life and Extraordinary Adventures of Private Ivan Chonkin, a satirical novel about a Russian soldier during World War II. A second part was published in 1971. At the outset of the Brezhnev stagnation period, Voinovich's writings stopped being published in the USSR, but continued publishing in samizdat, hand-written copies and in the West. In 1974, the authorities began a systematic harassment of Voinovich due to his writing and his political attitude. Voinovich was excluded from the Soviet Writers' Union the same year. According to Voinovich, in 1975 an attempt to poison him was made by the KGB.

His telephone line was cut off in 1976. He and his family were forced to emigrate in 1980, being stripped of his citizenship. He settled in Munich, West Germany after being invited by the Academy of Fine Arts in Munich. For a while he worked for Radio Liberty. Voinovich helped publish Vasily Grossman's famous novel Life and Fate by smuggling photo films secretly taken by Andrei Sakharov. In 1987, he published the second of his arguably most well-known works, Moscow 2042. Mikhail Gorbachev restored his Soviet citizenship in 1990 and he subsequently moved back to Russia.

His literary agent was American attorney Leonard W. Schroeter.

=== Public activism in Russia ===
Voinovich continued to voice his political convictions also after the fall of the Soviet Union.

In 2001 Voinovich signed an open letter expressing support to the NTV channel, and in 2003 a letter against the Second Chechen War. On 25 February 2015 he published an "Open Letter from Vladimir Voinovich to the President of Russia" in which he asked Putin to release the Ukrainian pilot Nadiya Savchenko who went on a hunger strike. He stated that her death might have an even greater effect on the world's opinion than the annexation of Crimea and the war in Donbas. In a 2015 interview with The Daily Beast, Voinovich said that "In some ways, it is worse today" than during the Soviet era and that "the freedoms we have are just leftovers."

In an interview with Radio Free Europe/Radio Liberty in 2017, Voinovich also voiced criticism of President Putin, saying that Putin had turned the country in a more conservative direction at the expense of politics "oriented toward the future." He repeated his opinion that the political situation in Russia today is comparable to the 1970s in the Soviet Union. "They are breaking up demonstrations. They are throwing people in prison on basically the same charges. True, they aren't giving seven-year sentences, but rather two. And now they have begun driving people out of the country", he noted.

=== Personal life ===
Voinovich was married three times. Between 1957 and 1964 he was married to Valentina Vasilievna Boltushkina (1929—1988). Together they had two children: daughter Marina Voinovich (1958—2006) and son Pavel Voinovich (born 1962), also a Russian writer and publicist, author of historical novels. His second wife was Irina Danilovna Braude (1938—2004). They had one daughter Olga Voinovich (born 1973), a German writer. Following Irina's death in 2004 Voinovich married Svetlana Yakovlevna Kolesnichenko (née Lianozova), an entrepreneur, also a widow of the Russian journalist Tomas Kolesnichenko. They lived in Moscow.

He was a member of the board of trustees of the Vera hospice.

Vladimir Voinovich died on the night of 27 July 2018 of a heart attack.

== Work ==
The first and second parts of his epic magnum opus The Life and Extraordinary Adventures of Private Ivan Chonkin ("Жизнь и необычайные приключения солдата Ивана Чонкина") are set in the Red Army during World War II, satirically exposing the daily absurdities of the totalitarian regime. "Chonkin" is now a widely known figure in Russian popular culture. The book was also made into a film by the Czech director Jiří Menzel. Many have pointed out the similarities between the story about Chonkin and The Good Soldier Švejk.

The third part of the novel was published in 2007. Not as well known so far as the previous two parts, it portrays the post-War life of the characters until the present, including Chonkin's involuntary emigration to the USA. Much attention is also paid to the figures of Lavrentiy Beria and Joseph Stalin, the latter being mockingly depicted as a son of Nikolai Przhevalsky and a Przewalski's horse. According to the author, the writing of the whole novel took him almost fifty years. The novel has been described as a Soviet Catch-22.

In 1986 he wrote a dystopian novel, Moscow 2042 (published in 1987). In this novel, Voinovich portrayed a Russia ruled by the "Communist Party of State Security" combining the KGB, the Russian Orthodox Church and the Communist Party. This party is led by a KGB general Bukashev (the name means "the bug") who meets the main character of the novel in Germany. Voinovich uses the motif of Coprophagia to criticize the failure of communist food policies. A Slavophile, Sim Karnavalov (apparently inspired by Aleksandr Solzhenitsyn), eventually overthrows the Party and enters Moscow on a white horse. The similarities between the plot of the book and the actual political developments in Russia following the fall of the Soviet Union have been noted by several observers.

Voinovich's other novels have also won acclaim. The Fur Hat is a satire alluding to Gogol's Overcoat. His Monumental Propaganda is a stinging critique of post-Communist Russia, a story that shows the author's opinion that Russians haven't changed much since the days of Joseph Stalin. Monumental Propaganda has been described as "an illuminating comment on the persistence of false idols and historical delusions".

His darkly humorous memoir The Ivankiad tells the true story of his attempt to get an upgraded apartment in the bureaucratic clog of the Soviet system.

In 2002 he published a controversial book of memoirs A Portrait Against the Background of a Myth, highly critical of Aleksandr Solzhenitsyn. Voinovich accused him of creating a cult around himself, of poor writing skills and his alleged antisemitism, among other things. The book received a mixed reaction. Yuri Semenov supported the point regarding "Solzhenitsyn's continuous degradation" as a writer, but also criticized Voinovich for simultaneously "glorifying himself and his books".

Liza Novikova of Kommersant compared the book to performance art, suggesting that "the author only helps creating the very same myth by trying to prove that Solzhenitsyn doesn't match the rank of a great writer". The book was widely seen as a reaction to Solzhenitsyn's two-volume historical work Two Hundred Years Together that was published in 2001–2002 and dedicated to the history of Jews in Russia and frequently regarded as antisemitic. Voinovich, however, said that he had started the work on his book before Two Hundred Years Together was even published and that he didn't have the patience to read it to the end.

He published his memoirs in 2010.

== Awards and honors ==
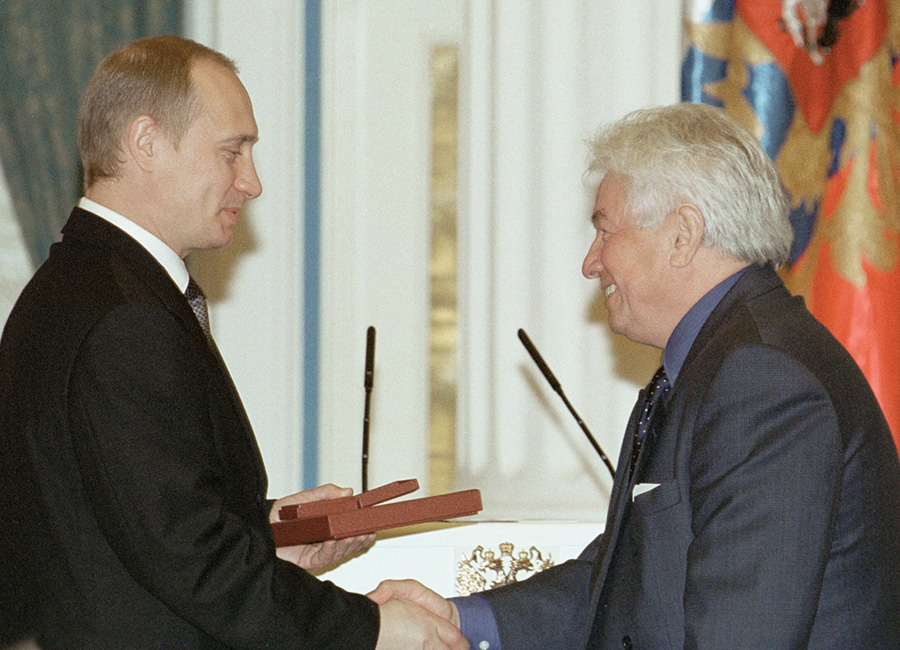
Russian President Vladimir Putin presents Voinovich with the State Prize of the Russian Federation on 12 June 2001. The prize was awarded for the book Monumental propaganda, about Neo-Stalinist legacy sitting in the subconscious of Russian citizens

Voinovich was awarded the State Prize of the Russian Federation for 2000, for his book "Monumental propaganda" about Soviet Neo-Stalinist legacy sitting in the subconscious of almost every citizen of the "free Russia". He also received Andrei Sakharov Prize for Writer's Civic Courage (2002).

== Bibliography ==
=== Stories and novels ===
- "Мы здесь живём (повесть)" [We Live Here (story)]. Novy Mir (in Russian) (1). 1961.
- "Хочу быть честным (повесть)" [I Want to Be Honest (story)]. Novy Mir (in Russian) (2). 1963.
- "Расстояние в полкилометра (рассказ)" [A Distance of Half a Kilometer (short story)]. Novy Mir (in Russian) (2). 1963.
- Мы здесь живём (повесть) [We Lives Here (story)] (in Russian). Moscow: Soviet writer. 1963.
- "Два товарища (повесть)" [Two Comrades (story)]. Novy Mir (in Russian) (2). 1963.
- "Два товарища (повесть)" [Two Comrades (story)]. Novy Mir (in Russian) (1). 1967.
- Мы здесь живём. Два товарища. Владычица (повести) [We Live Here. Two Comrades. Mistress (stories)] (in Russian). Moscow: Soviet writer. 1972.
- Степень доверия. Повесть о Вере Фигнер [A Degree of Trust. The Story about Vera Figner] (in Russian). Moscow: Politizdat. 1972.
- "Жизнь и необычайные приключения солдата Ивана Чонкина (часть 1)" [The Life and Extraordinary Adventures of Private Ivan Chonkin (part 1)]. Grani (in Russian) (72). 1969.
- "Путем взаимной переписки (повесть)" [By Means of Mutual Correspondence (story)]. Grani (in Russian) (87–88). 1973.
- "Происшествие в "Метрополе"" [Incident in "Metropol"]. Kontinent (in Russian) (5). 1975.
- Жизнь и необычайные приключения солдата Ивана Чонкина [The Life and Extraordinary Adventures of Private Ivan Chonkin] (in Russian). Paris: YMCA-Press. 1975.
- Иванькиада, или Рассказ о вселении писателя Войновича в новую квартиру [The Ivankiad: or, The tale of the writer Voinovich's installation in his new apartment] (in Russian). Ann Arbor, Michigan: Ardis Publishing. 1976.
- The Life and Extraordinary Adventures of Private Ivan Chonkin. Vintage/Ebury, Random House Group. 1977. ISBN 978-0224013284.
- Voinovich, Vladimir; Fiene, Donald M. (Autumn 1977). "A Distance of Half a Kilometer". Chicago Review. 29 (2): 5–21. doi:10.2307/25303676. JSTOR 25303676.
- Претендент на престол: Новые приключения солдата Ивана Чонкина [Pretender to the Throne: The Further Adventures of Private Ivan Chonkin] (in Russian). Paris: YMCA-Press. 1979.
- Pretender to the Throne: The Further Adventures of Private Ivan Chonkin. Northwestern University Press. 1981. ISBN 978-0810112445.
- "Etude". TriQuarterly (55): 130. Fall 1982.
- "Писатель в советском обществе" [Writer in Soviet Society]. Possew (in Russian) (9): 32. 1983.
- "Фиктивный брак (водевиль)" [Sham Marriage (vaudeville)]. Time and We (in Russian) (72). 1983.
- "Если враг не сдается…: Заметки о социалистическом реализме" [If Enemy Does not Surrender…: Notes of Socialist Realism]. Country and World (in Russian) (10). 1984.
- "Трибунал" [Tribunal] (in Russian). London. 1985.
- Антисоветский Советский Союз [The Anti-Soviet Soviet Union] (in Russian). Ann Arbor, Michigan: Ardis Publishing. 1985.
- Москва 2042 [Moscow 2042] (in Russian). Ann Arbor, Michigan: Ardis Publishing. 1986.
- Woinowitsch, Wladimir (1989) [1986]. Ihr seid auf dem richtigen Weg, Genossen [You are on the right way, comrades] (in German). Piper. ISBN 978-3492030045.
- Шапка [The Hat] (in Russian). London: Overseas Publications Interchange Limited. 1988. ISBN 978-1870128650.
- Дело № 34840 [The Case No 34840] (in Russian). Moscow: Text. 1994. ISBN 978-5871060957.
- The Life and Extraordinary Adventures of Private Ivan Chonkin (reprint ed.). Northwestern University Press. 1995. ISBN 978-0810112438.
- Замысел [The Design] (in Russian). Moscow: Vagrius. 1995.
- Запах шоколада (повести и рассказы) [The Smell of Chocolate (stories and short stories)] (in Russian). Moscow: Vagrius. 1997.
- Монументальная пропаганда [Monumental Propaganda] (in Russian). Moscow: Izograf. 2000.
- Портрет на фоне мифа [A Portrait Against the Background of a Myth] (in Russian). Moscow: Eksmo-Press. 2002. ISBN 978-5040102532.
- Перемещённое лицо [A Displaced Person] (in Russian). Moscow: Eksmo. 2007. ISBN 978-5699237432.
- Автопортрет: роман моей жизни [Self-portrait: Novel of My Life] (in Russian). Moscow: Eksmo. 2007. ISBN 978-5699390021.
- Два плюс один в одном флаконе [Two Plus One Rolled into One] (in Russian). Moscow: Eksmo. 2010. ISBN 978-5699417629.
- A Displaced Person: The Later Life and Extraordinary Adventures of Private Ivan Chonkin. Northwestern University Press. 2012. ISBN 978-0810126626.
- Малое собрание сочинений в 5-ти томах [A small collection of works in 5 volumes] (in Russian). Moscow: Fabula. 1993–1995.

=== Articles and interviews ===
- Voinovich, Vladimir (June 1975). "I am a realist". Index on Censorship. 4 (2): 49–57. doi:10.1080/03064227508532424. S2CID 147359701.
- Voinovich, Vladimir (20 June 1976). "Oh, for a room of my own". The New York Times Magazine (20).
- Voinovich, Vladimir; Hosking, Geoffrey (August 1980). "Profile". Index on Censorship. 9 (4): 19–22. doi:10.1080/03064228008533088.
- Phillips, William; Shragin, Boris; Aleshkovsky, Yuz; Kott, Jan; Siniavski, Andrei; Aksyonov, Vassily; Litvinov, Pavel; Dovlatov, Sergei; Nekrassov, Viktor; Etkind, Efim; Voinovich, Vladimir; Kohak, Erazim; Loebl, Eugen (Winter 1984). "Writers in exile III: a conference of Soviet and East European dissidents". The Partisan Review. 51 (1): 11–44.
- Voinovich, Vladimir (October 1985). "The life and fate of Vasily Grossman". Index on Censorship. 14 (5): 9–10. doi:10.1080/03064228508533943. S2CID 143582381.
- Voinovich, Vladimir (Spring 1985). "The life and fate of Vasily Grossman and his novel". Survey: A Journal of East and West Studies. 29 (1): 186–189.
- Voinovich, Vladimir (19 July 1987). "Where glasnost has its limits". The New York Times Magazine: 31.
- Voinovich, Vladimir; Heim, Michael (Autumn 1990). "An exile's dilemma". The Wilson Quarterly. 14 (4): 114–120. JSTOR 40258529.
- Voinovich, Vladimir (January 1996). "The gang of four". Index on Censorship. 25 (1): 62–70. doi:10.1177/030642209602500116.
- Voinovich, Vladimir; Jamieson, John (2003). "Stream of consciousness". New Zealand Slavonic Journal: 165–169. JSTOR 40922151.
- Копылова, Вера (23 August 2007). "Один в поле Войнович. Папа Чонкина: "В закрытом обществе писатель был гораздо нужнее, чем теперь"" [One man in the field is Voinovich. Chonkin's father: "In a closed society writer was much more needed than now"]. Moskovskij Komsomolets (in Russian).
- Тимофеева, Ольга (15 January 2016). "Владимир Войнович: "У вождей с либеральными намерениями, но диктаторским характером ум требует одного, а натура другого"" [Vladimir Voinovich: "Leaders with liberal intentions but dictatorial nature have mind that requires one thing and nature that requires another thing"]. Novaya Gazeta (in Russian). No. 3.
- Золовкин, Сергей (22 March 2016). ""Простой таджикский рабочий, отягченный еврейской фамилией…" Владимир Войнович — за праздничным столом в Мюнхене в окружении русскоговорящих журналистов" ["A simple Tajik worker, weighed down by a Jewish surname…" Vladimir Voinovich round the festive board in Munich, surrounded by Russian-speaking journalists]. Novaya Gazeta (in Russian). No. 22.
