= The Life and Extraordinary Adventures of Private Ivan Chonkin =

1969 novel by Vladimir Voinovich

- Author: Vladimir Voinovich
- Original title: Жизнь и необычайные приключения солдата Ивана Чонкина
- Language: Russian
- Publication date: 1969 (part 1), 1979 (part 2), 2007 (part 3)
- Publication place: Soviet Union
- English publication date: 1977 (part 1), 1981 (part 2), 2012 (part 3)

The Life and Extraordinary Adventures of Private Ivan Chonkin (Russian: Жизнь и необыча́йные приключе́ния солда́та Ива́на Чо́нкина, Zhizn i neobïchaynïe priklyucheniya soldata Ivana Chonkina) is a 1969–2007 novel by Soviet dissident writer Vladimir Voinovich. Voinovich wrote two sequels to the novel Pretender to the Throne: The Further Adventures of Private Ivan Chonkin (Russian: Претенде́нт на престо́л: Но́вые приключе́ния солда́та Ива́на Чо́нкина, Pretendent na prestol: Novye priklyucheniya soldata Ivana Chonkina), 1979, and A Displaced Person (Russian: Перемещённое лицо́, Peremyeshyonnoye litso), 2007; together, the trilogy constitutes Voinovich's magnum opus.

The first book is set in the Red Army during World War II, satirically exposing the daily absurdities of the totalitarian Soviet regime. It was rejected by Novy Mir, circulated by samizdat, and first printed by an emigre magazine in West Germany, allegedly without author's consent, after which Voinovich was banned from publishing his books in the Soviet Union.

Ivan Chonkin, a combination of a Russian folk hero Ivan the Fool and the "Good Soldier" Švejk, is now a widely known figure in Russian popular culture.

== Plot summary ==
On the eve of World War II, Ivan Chonkin, the most dispensable soldier, is sent to guard a disabled military plane that crash landed on a kolkhoz (collective farm). Forgotten by his command, he earns favors of a nearby kolkhoznik woman Nyura and moves in with her. Nyura's cow eats the patch of experimental tomato-potato hybrids of the local mad genius agronomist Gladyshev, and in a retaliation the latter sends an anonymous note to NKVD that Chonkin is a deserter.

When NKVDists come to arrest Chonkin, he, being a Good Soldier, refuses to leave the post, and arrests the NKVDists himself. Only after several days is the fact of missing secret police noticed, and the raion Party leader is told via phone that they have been arrested by "Chonkin and his baba (woman)", which he mishears as "Chonkin and his banda (gang)".

A regiment is sent against "Chonkin's gang", but Chonkin successfully fends them off until they use artillery. When a General, named Drynov, incredulously learns that Chonkin single-handedly (with his baba) was holding off the whole regiment, he declares Chonkin a hero and awards him an order taken off his own chest. When the NKVD lieutenant shows the order for Chonkin's arrest, Drynov shrugs and tells them to carry out their duty, at which point Chonkin is arrested and carried off in the back of the truck to the "Right Place", leaving Nyura on her knees on the road weeping after Chonkin as the scene closes. The book ends with the joke on Gladyshev, whose misunderstanding of evolution (that monkeys became man through labor and intelligence) has been thoroughly unsettled by Chonkin's question why horses do not become men if they work harder than men do, finds a note attached to the bottom of a hoof of his dead horse which had earlier disappeared. Supposing the horse had evolved and written the note, he is spooked and crosses himself.

== Film ==
In 1994, the book was made into a Russian-language film Life and Extraordinary Adventures of Private Ivan Chonkin (Жизнь и необычайные приключения солдата Ивана Чонкина) by the Czech director Jiří Menzel, starring Gennady Nazarov as Ivan Chonkin. The film's Czech title is Život a neobyčejná dobrodružství vojáka Ivana Čonkina.

== Editions ==
- Жизнь и необычайные приключения солдата Ивана Чонкина (часть 1) [The Life and Extraordinary Adventures of Private Ivan Chonkin (part 1)]. Grani (in Russian) (72). 1969.
- Жизнь и необычайные приключения солдата Ивана Чонкина [The Life and Extraordinary Adventures of Private Ivan Chonkin] (in Russian). Paris: YMCA-Press. 1975.
- The Life and Extraordinary Adventures of Private Ivan Chonkin. Vintage/Ebury, Random House Group. 1977. ISBN 978-0224013284.
- The Life and Extraordinary Adventures of Private Ivan Chonkin (reprint ed.). Northwestern University Press. 1995. ISBN 978-0810112438.
- Претендент на престол: Новые приключения солдата Ивана Чонкина [Pretender to the Throne: The Further Adventures of Private Ivan Chonkin] (in Russian). Paris: YMCA-Press. 1979.
- Pretender to the Throne: The Further Adventures of Private Ivan Chonkin. Northwestern University Press. 1981. ISBN 978-0810112445.
- Pretender to the Throne: The Further Adventures of Private Ivan Chonkin (reprint ed.). Northwestern University Press. 1995. ISBN 978-0810112445.
- Перемещённое лицо [A Displaced Person] (in Russian). Moscow: Eksmo. 2007. ISBN 978-5699237432.
- A Displaced Person: The Later Life and Extraordinary Adventures of Private Ivan Chonkin. Northwestern University Press. 2012. ISBN 978-0810126626.

== See also ==
- Moscow 2042
