= Life and Extraordinary Adventures of Private Ivan Chonkin =

The Life and Extraordinary Adventures of Private Ivan Chonkin
- Directed by: Jiří Menzel
- Screenplay by: Zdeněk Svěrák
- Based on: Books 1 and 2 of The Life and Extraordinary Adventures of Private Ivan Chonkin by Vladimir Voinovich
- Produced by: Eric Abraham; Katya Krausova
- Starring: Gennady Nazarov; Zoya Buryak; Vladimir Ilyin
- Cinematography: Jaromír Šofr
- Edited by: Jiří Brožek
- Music by: Jiří Šust
- Production companies: Canal+; CNC; Domenico Procacci; La Sept; Portobello Pictures
- Distributed by: Channel Four Films (United Kingdom); MKL Distribution (France); Fandango (Italy)
- Release dates: 1 October 1994 (Czech Republic); 9 November 1994 (France); 27 October 1995 (United Kingdom)
- Running time: 106 minutes
- Countries: Russia; Czech Republic; United Kingdom; France; Italy
- Languages: Russian; Czech

The Life and Extraordinary Adventures of Private Ivan Chonkin (Russian: Жизнь и необыча́йные приключе́ния солда́та Ива́на Чо́нкина, Czech: Žvot a neobyčejná dobrodružství vojáka Ivana Čonkina) is a 1994 war comedy film directed by Jiří Menzel, based on the first two books of Vladimir Voinovich's novel trilogy of the same name. An international co-production between Russia, Czech Republic, the United Kingdom, France and Italy, it entered the competition at the 51st Venice International Film Festival, in which it won the President of the Italian Senate's Gold Medal.

== Plot ==
The film is set in 1941 in the Soviet Union, before and during the first months of its involvement in World War II.

A military plane is forced to make an emergency landing near the small village of Krasnoye. The plane is unable to be easily removed, and so Ivan Chonkin is sent to guard it.

Chonkin is a soldier serving with a military unit stationed near the village. Ivan is serving his conscription time in the logistical division of the regiment, helping to cook the unit's meals and move supplies about.

Chonkin is sent to the village and, eventually finds accommodation with the village postmistress Nura. Soon he moves the aeroplane to the courtyard of Nura's hut and moves in with her permanently.

== Cast ==
- Gennady Nazarov – Ivan Chonkin
- Zoya Buryak – Nyura
- Vladimir Ilyin – Golubev
- Aleksei Zharkov – Gladishev
- Valeri Zolotukhin – Kilin
- Zinovy Gerdt – Moisei Stalin
- Sergei Garmash – Milyaga
- Maria Vinogradova – Granny Dunia
- Yuri Dubrovin – Volkov
- Marián Labuda – Opalikov
- Aleksandr Garin – Svintsov
- Valery Nikolaev – Balashov
- Sergey Stepanchenko – Plechevoy
- Alexander Yelagin – Malakhov
