= Match TV =

Russian sport TV channel

Match TV Матч ТВ
- Country: Russia

Programming
- Language: Russian
- Picture format: 1080i HDTV

Ownership
- Owner: Gazprom Media

History
- Launched: November 1, 2015; 11 years ago
- Replaced: Russia-2

Links
- Webcast: https://matchtv.ru/on-air (Russia only)
- Website: https://matchtv.ru/

Match! TV (Russian: Матч! ТВ) is a Russian free-to-air federal sports television channel owned by Gazprom Media.

The channel began broadcasting on November 1, 2015, and had been created in accordance with the order of Russian president Vladimir Putin, with the assistance of the editorial office of Gazprom-Media Holding, technical assistance of ANO Sports Broadcasting (Panorama's brand) and the frequency of Russia-2 (VGTRK). The general producer of the channel was Tina Kandelaki until she was replaced in September 2021 by Alexander Tashchin.

== History ==
=== Establishment ===
On 17 April 2015, the RBK media holding initially reported unconfirmed information that the TV channel Russia-2 might be transferred to the Gazprom-Media holding, with NTV-Plus planning to create a full-fledged sports channel on its basis. Three days later, according to TASS, Russian Sports Minister Vitaly Mutko expressed concern during a press conference in Sochi about the lack of a publicly accessible sports channel in Russia. He stated that the issue of sports broadcasting would be discussed at the Presidential Council for the Development of Physical Culture and Sports but declined to reveal details of the planned decisions. The Council meeting took place on 2 June 2015. During the meeting, Gazprom-Media CEO Dmitry Chernyshenko announced the creation of a new specialized, publicly accessible sports channel, to be formed on the production and technological base of NTV-Plus and the Sportivnoye Veshchaniye (Sports Broadcasting) autonomous non-profit organization, as well as the distribution network of Russia-2. On 5 June 2015, the National Sports Channel limited liability company was established.

According to item 4 of the list of instructions following the Council meeting, signed by the Russian president on 25 June 2015, work on creating a nationwide mandatory public sports channel was to be completed by 1 August 2015. The new channel was named Match TV. As reported by the newspaper Vedomosti and confirmed by sports commentator Georgy Cherdantsev, all employees of Russia-2 were given the opportunity to transfer to Gazprom-Media.

On 15 July 2015, Russian President Vladimir Putin amended the decree "On Nationwide Mandatory Public TV and Radio Channels," replacing Russia-2 with Match TV in item 3 of the list, corresponding to the channel's position in the first multiplex of digital terrestrial television. On 31 July, the first license for Match TV was issued, incorporating all existing frequencies of Russia-2 (926 analog broadcast frequencies). Temporarily, from 1 August to 31 October 2015, Russia-2 broadcast in place of Match TV across its entire distribution network, both in analog and digital television.

Match TV was led by prominent TV host, producer, and public figure Tina Kandelaki (General Producer) and former CEOs of the Domashny channel Natalia Bilan (Creative Director) and Natalia Korotkova (Programming Director). Kandelaki's appointment was met with mixed reactions from viewers and staff of NTV-Plus sports channels, leading to a public dispute between Kandelaki and commentator Vasily Utkin, who announced on 11 August his refusal to work under the new director. However, he reversed his decision a month later.

In early October, employees of Sportivnoye Veshchaniye branches received notices of dismissal due to the "completion of the company's statutory activities." Equipment used during the 2014 Winter Olympics in Sochi—including 12 mobile TV stations, 7 mobile satellite communication stations, 2 mobile special equipment stations, a mobile central control room, and more—was transferred to Match TV and regional broadcasters. However, only a portion of Panorama employees moved to the new channel. The equipment was valued at $150 million.

=== Promotion ===
The new channel's logo, designed in the style of Soviet constructivism by Shandesign studio, was unveiled in mid-September 2015. It immediately faced significant criticism from designers. The logo was displayed in the top-right corner of the screen, with its symbols alternating between red and white every 7 seconds during broadcasts. During commercials (and likely promos as well), the logo disappeared from the screen. Typically, the logo would vanish 0.5 seconds after a commercial break began and reappear 0.5 seconds after it ended. In rare cases, the logo disappeared 7 seconds before a commercial block (not just the break) and reappeared 7 seconds after it concluded. On 25 October, rappers Basta and Smoky Mo released a music video for the song Final Match, which became the channel's anthem. The video was directed by Rezo Gigineishvili.

Several promotional videos were produced featuring Match TV commentators and dozens of famous athletes. On 15 October 2015, unified metro passes for 60 rides (with a total print run of 1.2 million) went on sale in the Moscow Metro, alongside outdoor advertisements featuring Alena Zavarzina, Yelena Isinbayeva, Alexander Kerzhakov, Alina Kabaeva, Timofey Mozgov, and Tatyana Navka. The campaign coincided with the launch of Match TV.

On 18 November, RBK published an investigation revealing that Match TV had managed to organize an advertising campaign in the Moscow Metro virtually for free. The sole advertising operator in the metro had been barred from placing any ads since August 2015. Match TV secured support from the Moscow Metro State Unitary Enterprise, whose employees placed stickers. Other advertising agencies were denied similar requests, as commercial advertising was to be handled by a new contractor to be selected at auction. The Moscow Department of Transport stated that it did not consider the Match TV stickers commercial advertising, and the metro's revenue from the operation equaled its expenses. However, by law, socially significant advertising must feature the Moscow coat of arms and a note stating, "With the support of the Moscow government," which were absent from the stickers. If the advertising had been classified as socially significant, its cost would have been 20% of the standard rate (5 million rubles instead of 25.3 million rubles per month).

On 29 October, an official presentation of the channel was held for the press and future viewers at the Radisson Royal Hotel in Moscow.

=== 2015–2020: Launch of Broadcasting ===
On 1 November 2015 at 6:30 Moscow time, Match TV began broadcasting. Due to a national day of mourning for the victims of the EgyptAir crash, the schedule was adjusted, and commercial advertising was suspended. The first live broadcast on Match TV was a VTB United League basketball game between CSKA Moscow and Kalev, aired at 13:00 Moscow time. The first hockey broadcast was a match between Moscow teams Dynamo and Spartak, which started four hours later. The KHL rescheduled two of Spartak's away games in the regular season to accommodate this broadcast, and the subsequent Russian Premier League match between Spartak and Ural was delayed by 10 minutes to show a shootout. The qualifying session for the 17th round of the Formula 1 World Championship was broadcast on Russia-2 on 31 October, while the Mexican Grand Prix aired on Match TV on 1 November.

Starting in 2016, during routine maintenance on Match TV, which occurred every three months from Tuesday to Wednesday night (later from Sunday to Monday night from 2020, and from Thursday to Friday starting 16 May 2025), broadcasts were temporarily switched to the old channels 2x2 and Zvezda. Maintenance periods initially ran from 2:00 to 10:00 Moscow time (extended to 11:00 from July 2016). These measures were introduced on 20 January 2016, following the practices of TV-6, TVS, and Sport/Russia-2, and coincided with similar schedules on NTV and Kultura.

In January 2016, about half of the channel's commentators were laid off, and several prominent sports journalists ended their collaboration with Match TV (including Vasily Utkin, Vladimir Stognienko, Alexey Andronov, Kirill Dementyev, Alexander Yelagin (briefly), and Alexander Kuzmak). Layoffs continued in 2017, despite denials from the channel's press service. Many managers involved in the channel's founding also left. Later, Maria Komandnaya, Ekaterina Kirillcheva, Valery Karpin, and Roman Gutzeit also ceased working with the channel.

In September 2016, Match TV refused to broadcast the Paralympics, from which Russian athletes were banned. Kandelaki stated that the decision was justified by "a sense of dignity and respect for the country".

Ratings in the channel's early months were lower than those of Russia-2. According to Colta.ru, by the end of 2015, Match TV ranked 19th in popularity among federal channels. By the end of 2016, it still lagged behind Russia-2, with a 3.2% share among men aged 25–59.

In May 2017, Match TV filed lawsuits against Sports.ru, accusing the site of illegally broadcasting clips from the Football National League. In response, Sports.ru accused the channel of plagiarizing content and threatened a countersuit. According to Vasily Utkin, to cut costs or due to potential restrictions on Russian participation, Match TV did not book studios or commentary positions for the 2018 Winter Olympics in Pyeongchang, sending only correspondents to South Korea. All other commentators worked from Moscow. Around the same time, the Russian government allocated 1 billion rubles to Match TV for coverage of the 2019 Universiade.

From October 2017, Match TV became part of the GPM Razvlekatelnoye TV holding, alongside thematic channels of the Match! sub-holding and the website Sportbox.ru (initially, the holding included channels TNT, TV-3, Pyatnitsa!, TNT4, 2x2, Super, and production studios Comedy Club Production and Good Story Media), managed by Arthur Janibekyan. Former Match! sub-holding director Dmitry Granov became the executive director of Match TV. The management model for the sports channel was revised to "optimize key business processes, reduce management costs, and improve operational efficiency."

From November 2017, mass layoffs began at Match TV, with several departments and services (including HR, finance, legal, analytics, and programming) being abolished, their functions transferred to GPM Razvlekatelnoye TV.

From January to March 2018, Match TV's average daily share among its target audience (men aged 14–59) was 3.4% nationwide, according to Mediascope.

Starting in 2019, Match TV lost broadcasting rights to several major football tournaments. In April 2019, it was reported that Rambler Group had acquired the rights to broadcast English Premier League matches for three years. From August 2019 to March 2022, the tournament was shown on the Okko streaming service (part of Rambler), which hired many former Match TV employees, including Vladimir Stognienko, Alexander Elagin, and Roman Gutzeit. However, from the 2022/2023 season, EPL rights returned to Match TV. Later, rights to La Liga, the Coppa Italia, the UEFA Nations League, and qualifiers for Euro 2024, Euro 2028, and the 2026 World Cup also moved from Match TV to Okko.

On 1 November 2019, Match TV changed its logo, graphics, and slogan to "Match! TV – The Empire of Sport". The logo also stopped disappearing during commercials. From that day, during ads, the logo became white and semi-transparent, without a black rectangle background (on 23 and 24 March 2024, the MATCH text appeared in silver without a gradient).

=== Since 2020 ===
From mid-March 2020, due to numerous cancellations and postponements of sports events caused by the global epidemiological situation, the channel began filling its broadcast schedule with a large number of in-house productions (including studio shows with guests and experts) and reruns of past sports broadcasts (e.g., highlights of the Russian national football team's matches at major tournaments and qualifiers, as well as the most exciting European club matches from previous years). Given the force majeure circumstances, the channel urgently acquired broadcasting rights for sports events not canceled due to the coronavirus, such as football leagues in Australia and Belarus (including their cup competitions). As a result, the channel's ratings dropped significantly—by half. For example, on 12 March 2020, the channel was watched by an average of 3.7% of male viewers aged 14–59 in Russian cities with populations over 100,000 (the demographic primarily targeted by the channel's advertisers). A year earlier, on 12 March, the channel's share was 5.3%. A similar decline was observed on other days. The channel's average share from 12 to 21 March fell from 3.7% the previous year to 2% during the same period this year.

Additionally, Russian print publications (both federal and regional) providing TV schedules did not include Match TV's programming for the periods of 23 March to 12 April, 15 to 21 June, and 3 to 9 August 2020, due to difficulties in compiling the schedule for the reasons mentioned above. Instead, schedules of other channels were temporarily published in its place. For example, magazines like 7 Days and Antenna-Telesem replaced Match TV's schedule with that of OTR, while the weekly Telec published the schedule of Pobeda. The weekly Komsomolskaya Pravda and its affiliated magazine Teleprogramma replaced it with the schedule of Channel Five. The weekly Vechernyaya Moskva was one of the few print publications that stopped publishing Match TV's schedule altogether, replacing it with TV-3.

On 6 November 2020, media reports indicated that the channel's chief producer, Natalia Bilan, had left her position.

From February 2021 to October 2022, Match TV aired non-sports content to boost ratings, including the automotive show Glavnaya Doroga (from NTV), the dance show Tantsy (from TNT), as well as various TV series (mostly reruns from other channels within the holding) and films. This programming helped expand its target audience.

In June 2021, Match TV faced challenges in broadcasting UEFA Euro 2020: initially, only review and analytical programs were aired, with no live or recorded match broadcasts. However, a few days later, official information confirmed that all matches would be shown, with 17 broadcast live. Additionally, match broadcasts during the tournament (like those on other broadcasting channels) were not available on third-party websites or online TV services due to rights holder restrictions—they were exclusively streamed on the channel's website.

Beyond match broadcasts and regular studio shows from its Moscow headquarters, Match TV set up a remote studio in one of the host cities, St. Petersburg, during Euro 2020. The 180-person team provided hourly updates from the scene, covering events at the Gazprom Arena, fan sentiments, and off-pitch activities in the city. The studio, housed in a futuristic mirrored sphere resembling a spaceship, became a hub for fans.

In August 2021, commentator Nobel Arustamyan left the channel. He cited a forced interview with FC Rostov player Pavel Mamaev, which focused entirely on his divorce proceedings, as the reason. After recording the interview, Arustamyan unsuccessfully tried to convince the channel's management not to air such content on a sports channel, ultimately resigning. Shortly after, Denis Kazansky also left. Over the channel's first six years, more than 15 commentators and journalists, including Vasily Utkin, Kirill Dementyev, Roman Gutzeit, Gennady Orlov, and Valery Karpin, had departed.

In 2021, the launch of a dedicated news agency called "Match+" (with Vasiliy Konovalov appointed as its CEO) and a press center was planned. However, the creation of a radio station within the "Match!" ecosystem was not considered due to the unprofitability of such an endeavor, according to Alexander Zharov, the CEO of Gazprom-Media.

In September 2021, Tine Kandelaki left her position as the channel's general producer to become the deputy CEO of Gazprom-Media. Her role was taken over by Alexander Taschin, the former editor-in-chief of Match TV, who had previously held leadership positions at Russia-2, Russia-24, and Russia Today.

In October 2021, it was reported that the new contract between the channel and the Russian Premier League exceeded $100 million per season.

In December 2021, the government allocated 7.954 billion rubles for the distribution of broadcasts from Match TV and other channels including Channel One, NTV, Channel Five, TV Center, and Carousel, in cities with populations under 100,000.

Following Russia's invasion of Ukraine and subsequent sanctions starting in March 2022, Match TV lost broadcasting rights for numerous sporting events, including French, Dutch, Portuguese, and Scottish football championships, English and French cups, South American World Cup qualifiers, Formula 1 championships, and various international competitions where Russian athletes were banned. The English Premier League suspended its six-year contract with Match TV, and the channel was also forced to relinquish the rights to WWE programming. As a result, the channel’s audience dropped sixfold. Prominent commentators such as Sergey Krivokharchenko, Alexander Shmurnov, Sergey Tarakanov, and Mikhail Polenov left the channel. Starting mid-July 2022, the channel began broadcasting matches from the First League (one match per round), having acquired the rights in February.

In October 2022, it was announced that non-sports-related movies and series would be removed from the channel’s programming grid in the new television season. Additionally, the channel secured exclusive rights to broadcast all matches of the 2022 FIFA World Cup, followed by acquiring rights to Spain’s Copa del Rey and Supercopa, as well as Brazil’s championship.

Beginning in February 2023, following a decision by Gazprom-Media CEO Alexander Zharov, Match TV ceased uploading content to YouTube. The holding stated that it was impossible to maintain long-term business relations with the platform after YouTube blocked the channels of TNT and NTV. Video content continued to be published on the Russian video hosting service Rutube.

In April 2024, the channel suspended renowned basketball commentator Vladimir Gomelsky after he referred to Dmitri Sonko, a player for Yenisey, as a “half-baked product who can’t do anything” during a VTB United League game. Gomelsky later transitioned to work with Okko.

In early April 2024, reports emerged that Match TV would likely no longer broadcast UEFA Champions League matches, with the rights instead going to the Okko streaming service. This followed UEFA awarding the rights without a tender to Kazakh company Quest Media, with whom the Russian sports channel failed to reach an agreement. The contract in question was estimated at around €30–35 million per season. On July 5, 2024, the channel confirmed the loss of rights to broadcast European club competitions in Russia.

In May 2024, it was announced that, for the first time in Russia, both the television channel Match TV and the streaming platform Okko—reported to have a monthly audience of 2.8 million viewers—had secured the broadcast rights to Euro 2024.

In July 2024, Match TV acquired the rights to broadcast Spain’s La Liga for the next seven years from Okko Sport.

Although Match TV was initially reported to hold the exclusive broadcasting rights to the FIFA Club World Cup 2025, in April 2025 it was revealed that Okko had signed a deal with DAZN to exclusively stream all matches of the tournament in Russia.

== Main broadcasts of the channel ==
=== Football ===
==== National teams ====
- UEFA European Championship (2016, 2020, 2024)
- FIFA World Cup (2018, 2022, 2026)

==== Club competitions ====
- Russian Premier League
- La Liga (2024–present)
- Serbian SuperLiga (2024–present)
- Serie A (2022–present)
- Russia Cup
- Praimera Liga (2026–present)

=== Olympics ===
- Tokyo 2020
- Beijing 2022

=== Ice Hockey ===
==== IIHF World Championship ====
- 2017
- 2018
- 2019
- 2020 (it was planned, but the tournament was cancelled due to the COVID-19 pandemic)
- 2021
- 2022
- 2023
- 2024
- 2025
- 2026

==== Former broadcast rights ====
- UEFA Champions League (tournament did not return after 2023-24 season broadcast was suspended and then curtailed)
- UEFA Europa League (tournament did not return after 2023-24 season broadcast was suspended and then curtailed)
- UEFA Europa Conference League (tournament did not return after 2023-24 season broadcast was suspended and then curtailed)
- Premier League (it was planned, but in response to the Russian invasion of Ukraine, the board suspended the league's six-year deal, with all Premier League programming leaving the station with immediate effect, and the contract was cancelled)
- Ligue 1 (rights were lost after 2021-22 season broadcast was suspended and then curtailed)
- Eredivisie (rights were lost after 2021-22 season broadcast was suspended and then curtailed)
- Primeira Liga (rights were lost after 2021-22 season broadcast was suspended and then curtailed)
- Scottish Premiership (rights were lost after 2021-22 season broadcast was suspended and then curtailed)
- Coupe de France (rights were lost after 2021-22 season broadcast was suspended and then curtailed)
- FA Cup (rights were lost after 2021-22 season broadcast was suspended and then curtailed)
- CONMEBOL World Cup qualifiers (rights were lost due to Russian invasion of Ukraine)
- Major League Soccer (rights were lost after 2022 season broadcast was suspended and then curtailed)
- National Hockey League (rights were lost after 2021-22 season broadcast was suspended and then curtailed)
- Formula One (2016-2021) (rights were lost due to Russian invasion of Ukraine)
- WWE (rights were lost due to Russian invasion of Ukraine)
- Olympic Games (rights were lost due to Russian invasion of Ukraine, will not return to Russian TV until at least 2030)

== Notable staff ==
- Yelena Grishina (born 1968), Olympic fencer
- Yana Batyrshina (born 1979), Olympic rhythmic gymnas
- Olga Bogoslovskaya (born 1964), Olympic athlete
- Konstantin Genich (born 1978), Russian professional football player
- Emma Hagieva (born 1989), Russian figure skater
- Yury Dud (born 1986), German-born Russian journalist
- Denis Pankratov (born 1974), Olympic swimmer
- Sergei Gimayev (1955 – 2017), Soviet ice hockey player
- Dmitry Guberniev (born 1974), Russian TV presenter
- Valery Karpin (born 1969), football manager and former player who manages the Russian national team
