= What a Wonderful Game =

1995 film

- Film poster
- Directed by: Pyotr Todorovsky
- Written by: Pyotr Todorovsky
- Produced by: Mira Todorovskaya
- Starring: Andrey Ilin; Gennady Nazarov; Denis Konstantinov
- Cinematography: Yury Raysky
- Edited by: Valeriya Belova
- Music by: Pyotr Todorovsky
- Release date: 1995
- Running time: 93 minutes
- Country: Russia
- Language: Russian

What a Wonderful Game (Russian: Какая чудная игра, romanized: Kakaya chudnaya igra) is a 1995 Russian drama film directed by Pyotr Todorovsky. It was entered into the 19th Moscow International Film Festival.

== Cast ==
- Andrey Ilin as Felix Raevskiy
- Gennady Nazarov as Kolya Rybkin
- Denis Konstantinov as Fedya Grinevich
- Gennadi Mitnik as Elizbar Radchaninov (voice by Sergei Chekan)
- Elena Yakovleva as Vera Markelova
- Yuriy Kuznetsov as Filimon Semenovich
- Larisa Udovichenko as Sophia Abramovna
- Nikolay Burlyaev as Mikhail Mikhailovich
- Maria Shukshina as Olya
- Darya Volga as Julia
- Elena Kotikhina as Mikhail Mikhailovich's mistress
- Dmitry Maryanov as Lev
- Aleksei Zolotnitsky as KGB captain
- Valentina Berezutskaya as the controller in the train
- Mikhail Dorozhkin as Yuri Shevtsov
- Aleksandr Oleshko as clarinettist
- Nina Agapova as teacher of English language
