= Konstantin Genich =

Russian footballer

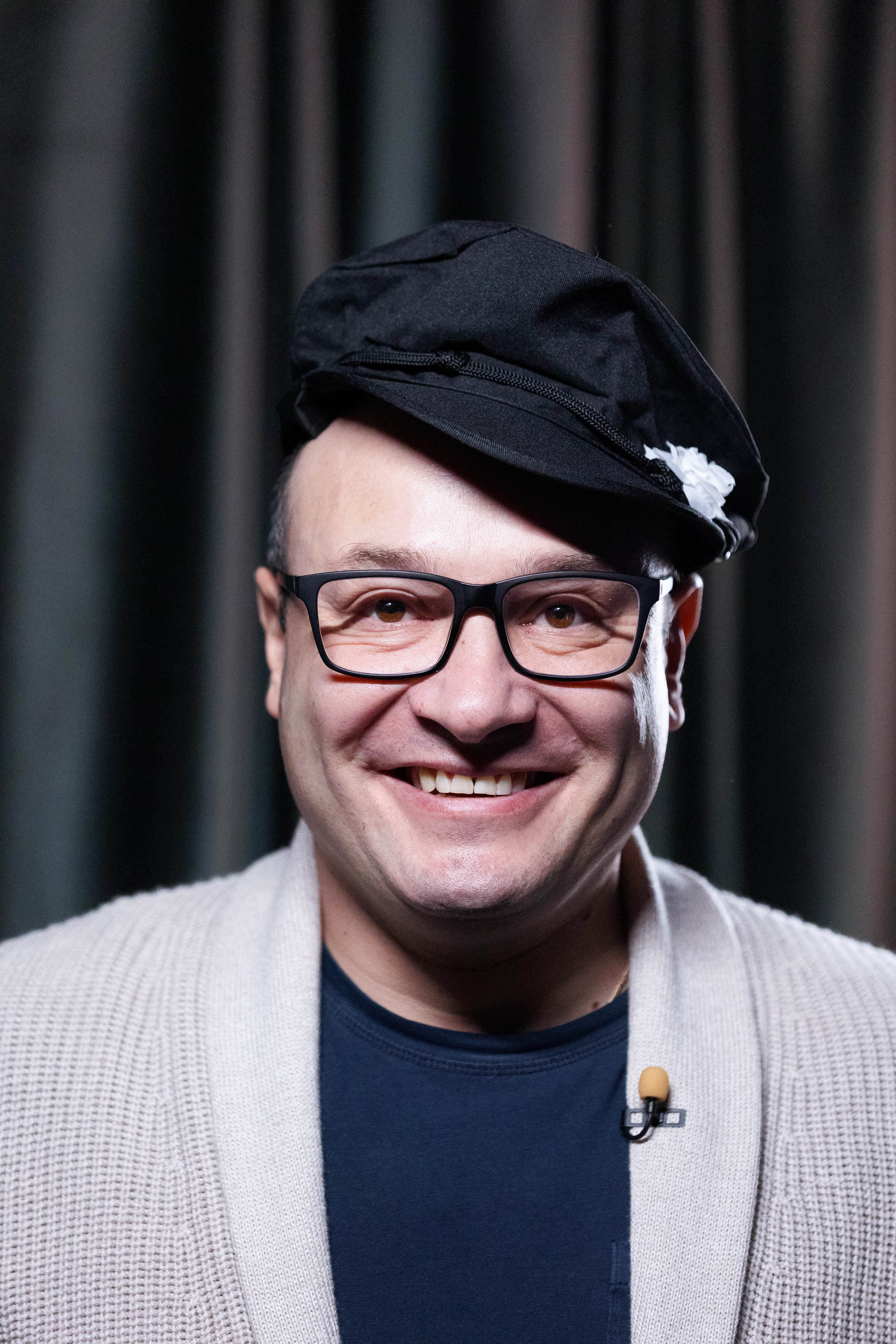
- Genich in 2023

Personal information
- Full name: Konstantin Mikhailovich Genich
- Date of birth: 3 January 1978 (age 48)
- Place of birth: Irkutsk, Russian SFSR, Soviet Union
- Height: 1.79 m (5 ft 10 in)
- Position: Midfielder

Youth career
- Spartak Moscow

Senior career*
Years	Team	Apps	(Gls)
1995	Spartak-d Moscow	6	(1)
1995	FC Torgmash Lyubertsy	14	(1)
1996	Spartak-d Moscow	16	(1)
1997	FC Monolit Moscow	32	(5)
1998	Ventspils	14	(3)
1999–2001	Khimki	84	(29)
2001	FC Pskov-2000	12	(2)
2001–2002	Maccabi Ahi Nazareth		
2002–2005	Amkar Perm	57	(9)
- * Club domestic league appearances and goals

Konstantin Mikhailovich Genich (Russian: Константин Михайлович Генич; born 3 January 1978) is a Russian former professional football player. He is a TV football commentator and expert of the Bookmaker Ratings.

== Career ==
At age six, he began playing football at the Moscow Dynamo academy, where he suffered a double leg fracture. By nine, he transferred to the Spartak Moscow youth academy. He later played in the Third League for Spartak’s reserve team and Moscow-based FC Monolit. In 1995, he also represented Lyubertsy’s Torqmash.

Failing to break into Spartak’s main squad, he spent the 1998 season with Latvian club Ventspils before returning to Russia. Over the next two-and-a-half seasons, he played for FC Khimki, helping them earn promotion to the First Division in 2000. That year, he became the top scorer in the "Center" zone (18 goals) and added four goals in the Russian Cup.

He made his Russian Football National League debut for Khimki on 7 April 2001 in a game against FC Shinnik Yaroslavl. He played three seasons in the FNL for Khimki and Amkar Perm.

By late 2001, he joined Pskov-2000. He twice attempted to sign with top-division clubs—Saturn Ramenskoye (1999–2000 preseason) and Torpedo Moscow (2000–2001)—but without success.

In early 2002, he played for Israeli club Maccabi Ahi Nazareth before joining First Division side Amkar Perm. On 1 November 2003, he scored one of two goals against Voronezh’s Fakel, securing Amkar’s promotion to the Premier League for the 2004 season. On 19 May 2004, Genich suffered a career-ending injury during a friendly against Tula Arsenal, tearing his cruciate ligament after slipping on flat ground. He never appeared in the Premier League for Amkar and retired in early 2006.

== Media career ==
In 2006, Genich started his career as a journalist and sportscaster in NTV Plus Sport channel and worked until 2015. He moved to MatchTV channel as television football commentator and expert in Russian and Spanish football.

Until February 2011, he hosted the radio show Vne igry (Offside) on Sport FM, returning to the station in 2013.

On 14 August 2013, he debuted as a commentator on Channel One during a World Cup qualifier between Northern Ireland and Russia. In 2014, he covered the FIFA World Cup and the opening match at Spartak Moscow’s Otkritie Arena, as well as the 2014 UEFA Champions League final.

In 2015, he co-narrated the video game FIFA 16 alongside commentator Georgy Cherdantsev and dubbed the Argentine animated film Metegol (2013). He also appeared as himself in the 2018 CTS TV series Bolshaya igra (The Big Game).

Since November 2015, he has worked for Match TV, commentating on UEFA Euro 2016 in France and the 2018 FIFA World Cup in Russia. On 5 December 2019, he participated in a televised Q&A with Russian Prime Minister Dmitry Medvedev as a Match TV representative.

He is a regular on the YouTube show Comment. Show, discussing football with players and coaches alongside Nobel Arustamyan, Roman Gutzeit, and Denis Kazansky.

In April 2023, he became head coach of the Match TV football team competing in the Media League, departing the role in June 2024.

== Criticism ==
On 14 July 2024, Genich and Dmitry Shnyakin commentated on the UEFA Euro 2024 final for Match TV. At halftime, journalist Aliona Doletskaya criticized them on Telegram, writing: "I beg you, fire commentators Genich and Shnyakin—this is a disgrace to football, the Russian language, and an insult to the ears." She specifically condemned their derogatory nicknames for players, such as "pensioner in Hermès sandals," "pineapple-head," and "macaroni hairstyle." Economist Nikita Krichevsky joined the backlash, claiming fans had switched to paid streams to avoid "verbal sewage." Genich responded sarcastically: "Nitpicking over mice—small fry in a damp basement. Compared to this grande dame." He defended the broadcast as "top-tier" and predicted a TEFI award win.

== Personal life ==
Married twice, he has a son from his first marriage and two daughters, Maria and Anna (b. 2013), from his second.

In January 2024, he admitted losing 15–20 million rubles on sports betting but denied struggling with gambling addiction.

== Honours ==
- Russian Second Division Zone Center top scorer: 2000 (18 goals)
