= Gennady Orlov =

Russian sports journalist and footballer

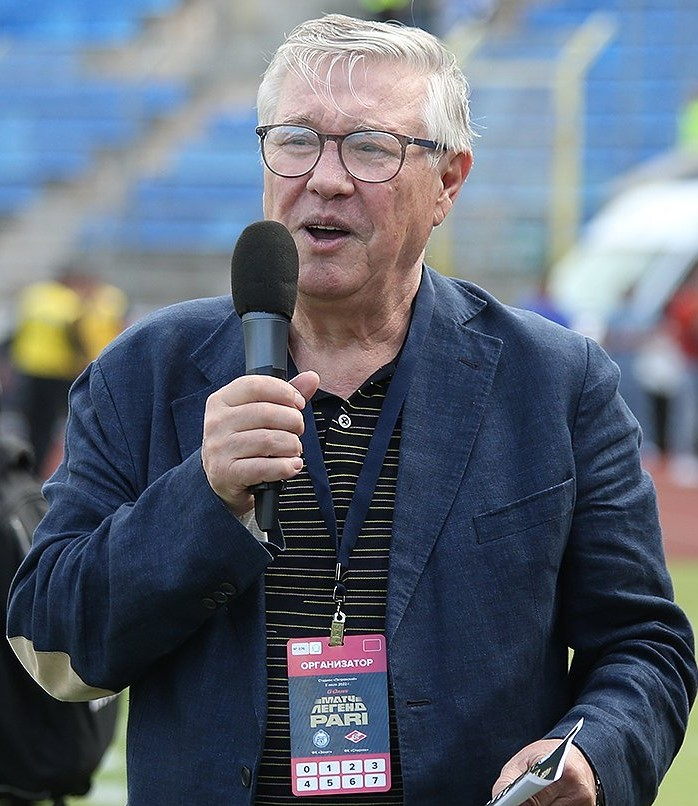
- Orlov in 2022

Personal information
- Full name: Gennady Sergeyevich Orlov
- Date of birth: 2 March 1945 (age 81)
- Place of birth: Kharkov, USSR
- Position: Second striker

Senior career*
Years	Team	Apps	(Gls)
1962–1965	Avangard Kharkov		
1966	Zenit	5	(0)
1967	Avangard Kharkov		
1968–1969	Dinamo Leningrad		

International career
- USSR youth
- * Club domestic league appearances and goals

Gennady Sergeyevich Orlov (Russian: Геннадий Серге́евич Орлов; born 2 March 1945) is a Russian sports journalist and a former Soviet footballer. He has lived in Leningrad since 1966 and has been a commentator since 1974. Orlov is best known for being a football commentator on Leningrad Television and, subsequently, Petersburg – Channel 5 for many years.

== See also ==
- Football in Russia
- List of football clubs in Russia
