= Evgeny Gomelsky =

Russian basketball coach

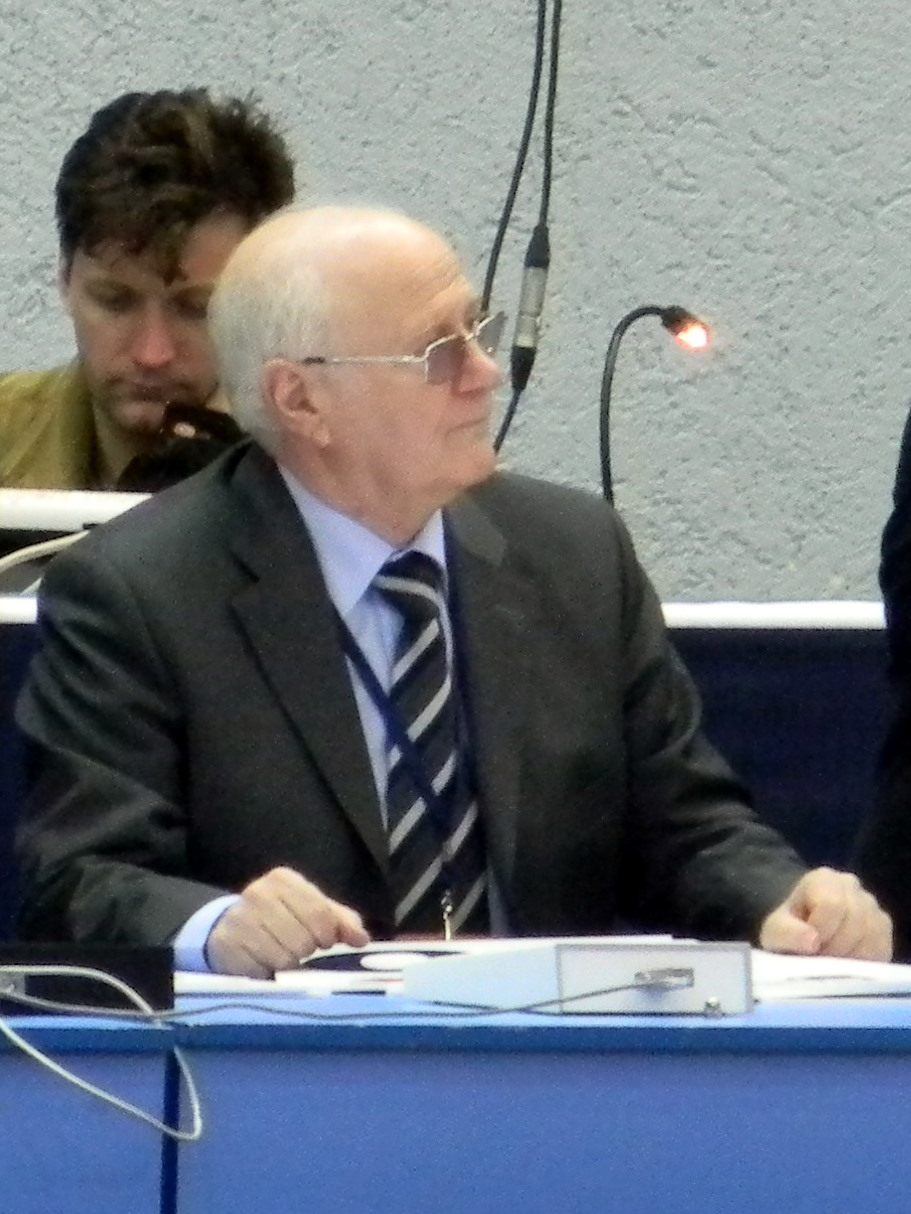
- Gomelsky, in 2011.

Personal information
- Born: 26 December 1938 (age 87) Leningrad, RSFSR, Soviet Union

Career information
- Playing career: 1954–1965
- Coaching career: 1961–2000

Career history

Playing
- 1954–1957: Spartak Leningrad
- 1957–1961: Rīgas ASK
- 1961–1965: Lokomotiv Volgograd

Coaching
- 1961–1963: Dynamo Volgograd Youth
- 1963–1968: Dynamo Volgograd
- 1968–1972: Dynamo Moscow
- 1973–1978: Dynamo Moscow Women
- 1979–1992: Dynamo Moscow
- 1985–1992: Dynamo Moscow Women
- 1986–1988: Soviet Union Women (assistant)
- 1988–1991: Soviet Union Women
- 1992: Unified Team Women
- 1992–1994: Elitzur Holon
- 1993: Israel Women
- 1993–1995: Russia Women
- 1994–1995: Dynamo Moscow
- 1995–1996: Godella Women
- 1998–2000: Russia Women

Career highlights
- As a head coach: Honored Coach of the Russian SSR (1967); Honored Coach of the USSR (1977); Russian Women's Basketball Coach of the Year (1998); Contributor to Russian Basketball (2008)
- FIBA Hall of Fame
Medals
Women's basketball
Head coach for Soviet Union
EuroBasket Women
Gold medal – first place	1989 Bulgaria
Gold medal – first place	1991 Israel
Goodwill Games
Silver medal – second place	1990 Seattle
Head coach for (Commonwealth of Independent States) Unified Team
Summer Olympics Women's
Gold medal – first place	1992 Barcelona
Head coach for Russia
FIBA World Cup Women
Silver medal – second place	1998 Germany
EuroBasket Women
Bronze medal – third place	1995 Czech Republic
Bronze medal – third place	1999 Poland

Evgeny Yakovlevich Gomelsky (Russian: Евгений Яковлевич Гомельский; 26 December 1938) is a Russian former professional basketball player and coach. He was inducted into the FIBA Hall of Fame, in 2010.

== Playing career ==
Gomelsky began his club career as a basketball player in 1954, with the Soviet League club Spartak Leningrad. In 1957, he moved to the Soviet League club Rīgas ASK. In 1961, he moved to the Soviet club Lokomotiv Volgograd. He retired from playing club basketball in 1965.

== Coaching career ==
=== Clubs ===
Gomelsky started his career as a basketball coach in 1961, with Dynamo Volgograd's youth teams. He became the head coach of the senior men's club of Dynamo Volgograd, in 1963. In 1968, he became the head coach of Dynamo Moscow. In 1973, he became the head coach of the Dynamo Moscow women's team.

In 1979, he returned to the position of head coach of Dynamo Moscow. From 1985 to 1992, Gomelsky was the head coach of both the men's and women's teams of Dynamo Moscow. From 1992 to 1994, he was the head coach of the Israeli Super League club Elitzur Holon. From 1994 to 1995, he was once again the head coach of Dynamo Moscow. From 1995 to 1996, he was the head coach of the Spanish women's league club Godella Women.

=== National teams ===
Gomelsky worked as an assistant coach of the Soviet Union women's national team, from 1986 to 1988, under its head coach at that time, Leonid Yachmenjov. Gomelsky then became the Soviet women's national team's head coach. As the head coach of the Soviet women's national team, he won the gold medal at the 1989 EuroBasket Women, the silver medal at the 1990 Goodwill Games, and the gold medal at the 1991 EuroBasket Women.

Gomelsky then worked as the head coach of the CIS Unified women's national team. With the CIS Unified Team, he won the gold medal at the 1992 Barcelona Summer Olympics. After that, Gomelsky worked as the head coach of the Russian women's national team. With Russia's women's national team, he won the bronze medal at the 1995 EuroBasket Women, the silver medal at the 1998 FIBA World Championship Women, and the bronze medal at the 1999 EuroBasket Women.

== Post-coaching career ==
In 2001, Gomelsky became the club President of Dynamo Moscow. He held that position until 2013.

== Personal life ==
Gomelsky's older brother, Alexander, was also a well-known basketball coach, and his nephew, Vladimir, also worked as a basketball player and coach.

== See also ==
- List of EuroBasket Women winning head coaches
