= Vladimir Gomelsky =

Russian television commentator, journalist, and writer

Personal information
- Born: October 20, 1953 (age 73) Leningrad, Russian SFSR, Soviet Union

Career history
- CSKA Moscow

Career highlights
- Master of Sports of the USSR International Class (1975); 4× USSR Premier League champion; USSR Cup winner; Honored Coach of the Russian SSR (1986)

Vladimir Alexandrovich Gomelsky (Russian: Владимир Александрович Гомельский; born 20 October 1953 in Leningrad) is a Russian TV commentator, journalist, and writer. He is also a former Soviet professional basketball player and coach.

== Basketball career ==
Gomelsky spent his entire basketball playing career with CSKA. In 1975, he received the title of Master of Sports of the USSR International Class. With CSKA, he was a four-time champion of the USSR Premier League, and also won the USSR Cup.

After he ended his playing career, he worked as a basketball coach. He was named an Honored Coach of the Russian SSR in 1986.

== Personal life ==
Gomelsky is the son of the late prominent basketball coach Alexander Gomelsky, and the nephew of Evgeny Gomelsky. Since 1989, he has worked as a sports commentator.

His favourite team is the Philadelphia 76ers and player Julius Erving.
