= Georgy Cherdantsev =

Russian sports commentator (born 1971)

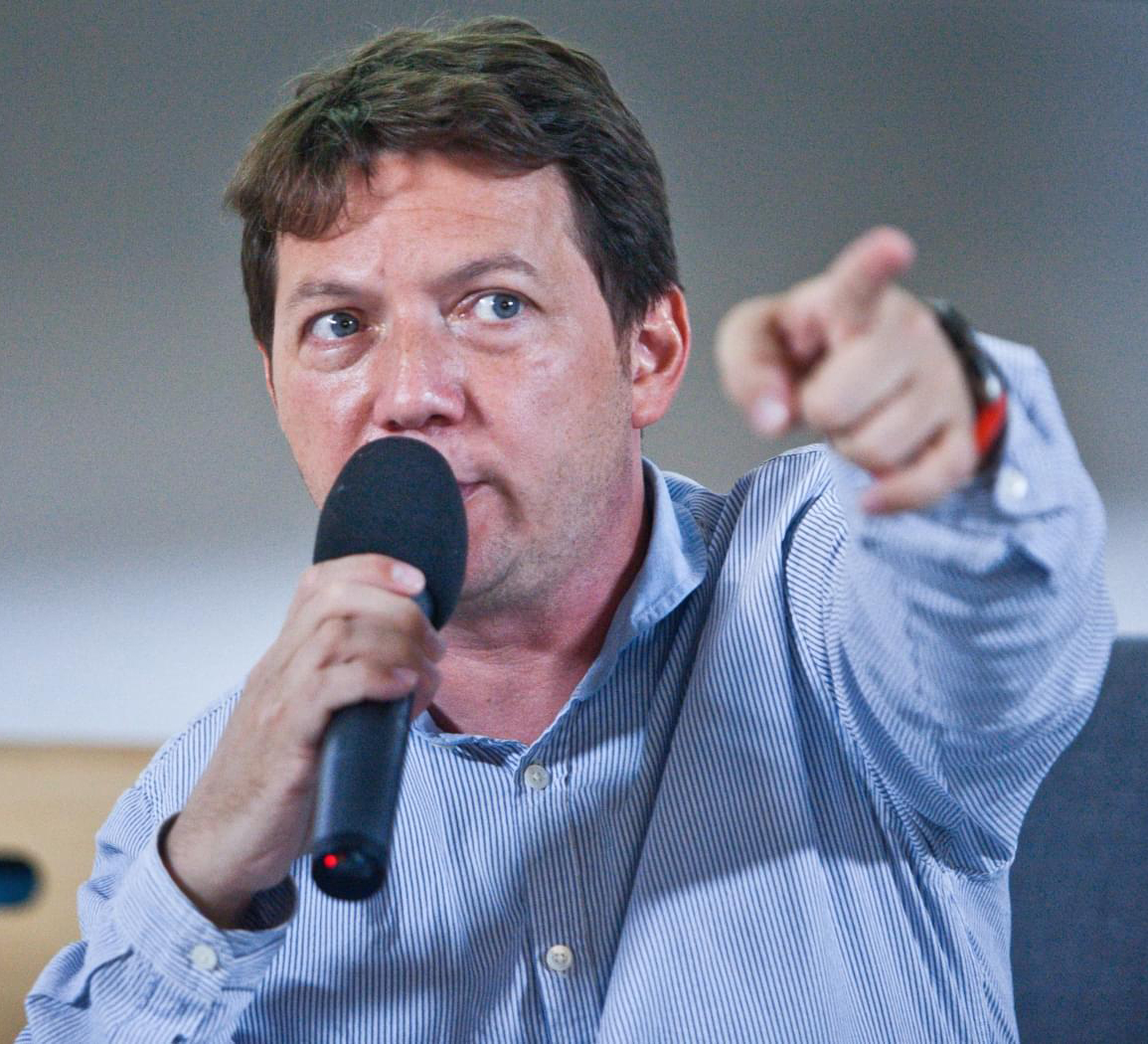
- Born: 1 February 1971 (age 55); Moscow, USSR
- Education: Moscow State University
- Occupation: sports commentator

Georgy Vladimirovich Cherdantsev (Russian: Георгий Владимирович Черданцев; February 1, 1971, Moscow, USSR) is a Russian sports commentator for TV and radio. He is mainly known as a sports commentator channels NTV and NTV Plus. He is currently working at the channel Match TV.

== Biography ==
Georgy Cherdantsev was born on February 1, 1971, in Moscow. Great-grandfather George wrote the first textbook on Russian shorthand. His great-grandfather created the first geographical map of Uzbekistan. One of the streets of Tashkent was named Cherdantsev for a while.

Since 1982 to 1989 he played in Moscow football championship among the clubs of Spartak-2, but was forced to finish his football career due to a knee injury. He graduated from the Department of Romance and Germanic Philology Faculty of Moscow State University in 1992, qualifying as a translator and English teacher. He also speaks Italian. After graduation he worked in the legal department of a bank, as a loader in a warehouse in Istanbul, and at a tourist company.

== Television ==
Beginning in 1996 Georgy was employed by NTV Plus television channel. He started in the position of interpreter, then began to report small stories, reports, football championships reviews. He was a correspondent for the program Football Club of Vasily Utkin. As a reporter for preparing reports for issues under the title football club in the World Cup 1998. He commented his first football game in 1998, a recorded broadcast World Cup games in France between the national teams of Italy and Norway.

From 2004 to 2007 he worked as a press attaché of the Russian Premier League.

In August 2013 he was appointed head of the TV channel Sport Plus. He presented the Olympic Channel from Sochi on Sport Plus in 2014 in tandem with the leading radio Sport FM reporter Sofya Tartakova.

He has mainly commentated on matches in Serie A. He also worked as a commentator for the World and European championships. He commentated on three UEFA Champions League seasons — in 2003, 2007 and 2015.

In April 2015 AST publishing house published a book about Cherdantsev called Notes of Football Commentator.

He has been the Russian commentator of EA Sports FIFA 16 together with Konstantin Genich.
