= Poland men's national basketball team =

Men's national basketball team representing Poland

Poland
- FIBA ranking: 19 (1 September 2026)
- Joined FIBA: 1934
- FIBA zone: FIBA Europe
- National federation: Polish Basketball Federation (PZKosz)
- Coach: Igor Miličić
- Nickname(s): Biało-czerwoni (The White and Red); Orły (The Eagles)

Olympic Games
- Appearances: 6
- Medals: None

FIBA World Cup
- Appearances: 2
- Medals: None

EuroBasket
- Appearances: 30
- Medals: (silver) Silver: (1963); (bronze) Bronze: (1939, 1965, 1967)
Home	Away

First international
- Estonia 47–19 Poland (Tallinn, Estonia; 16 February 1935)

Biggest win
- England 44–140 Poland (Budapest, Hungary; 9 June 1955)

Biggest defeat
- Soviet Union 126–76 Poland (Amsterdam, Netherlands; 30 June 1988)

The Poland men's national basketball team (Polish: Reprezentacja Polski w koszykówce) represents Poland in international basketball competitions. They are controlled by the Polish Basketball Federation (PZKosz).

Poland has competed at the EuroBasket on 30 occasions, with their best performance at the tournament coming in 1963, as hosts, finishing as runners-up. Poland has competed six times at the Olympic Games, with their best finish being fourth place at the first edition of the event in 1936. Poland have also made two appearances at the FIBA World Cup, with their first coming in 1967, and their second occurring 52 years later in 2019.

== History ==
=== 1936 Olympic Games ===
The 1936 Summer Olympics was the first tournament Poland took part in. They eventually placed an impressive fourth at the event, in the then 23 team tournament.

=== EuroBasket 1937 ===
The EuroBasket 1937 in Riga, marked the first ever appearance for the national team at the European Basketball Championship. In the preliminary round the Poles dropped their first match to France, but rebounded with victories against Latvia and Czechoslovakia. They finished with a 2–1 record, and moved on to the semi-finals where they played Lithuania. There they were defeated by the eventual champion Lithuanian squad 31–25, relegating them to the bronze medal match. For the bronze, the team was defeated again by France to end their maiden run at the Eurobasket.

=== EuroBasket 1939 ===
Two years later at EuroBasket 1939 in Kaunas, the competition format was a single round-robin without playoffs. Latvia and Lithuania both defeated Poland whereas the other five teams in the competition fell to the Poles. With Lithuania undefeated and Poland and Latvia tied with a record of 5–2, the loss to Latvia was decisive in pushing Poland to third place and the bronze.

=== EuroBasket 1946 ===
Due to World War II, the next European basketball championship was at EuroBasket 1946 in Geneva. The Poles started well, with a victory over Luxembourg. They then lost their next two preliminary round matches to Italy, and Hungary to finish in third place of the four-team group. That result put them in the 7th–10th place classification semi-final, where they lost again, this time to Belgium. In the 9th/10th place playoff, Poland defeated England.

=== EuroBasket 1947 ===
The EuroBasket returned to the odd-year schedule with EuroBasket 1947 in Prague. Poland placed second in their preliminary group, losing only to eventual silver medallist Czechoslovakia en route to a 2–1 record. They then went 1–2 in their semi-final group, falling to the gold medal Soviet Union team and bronze medal Egypt. This put Poland in a 5th/6th place playoff against France, who had been 1–2 in the opposite semi-final group. France went on to win, 62–29.

=== EuroBasket 1955 ===
After an 8-year hiatus, Poland returned at EuroBasket 1955 in Budapest. They quickly showed that they could still play with the European field, winning all four of their preliminary round games to advance to the final round. Despite their mediocre 3–4 record in that round, the Poles had demonstrated that they could be effective against the best of the European pool with a 72–68 win over eventual runners-up Czechoslovakia. They eventually finished 5th overall of the 18 teams in the tournament.

=== EuroBasket 1957 ===
Two years later in Sofia, Poland competed at EuroBasket 1957. Despite being seeded into the same preliminary pool as the Soviet Union, the Poles went 2–1 in the round-robin and advanced to the final round. There they lost their first six of seven games in that round, getting their first win in the last game of the round, against France to finish the tournament in 7th place.

=== EuroBasket 1963 ===
Five years later the national team hosted EuroBasket 1963 in Wrocław. They got off to a fast start winning their first match against Spain 79–76. They fell to the Soviet Union in their next match. But, eventually ran the table the rest of the way in their preliminary round group to finish with an 6–1 record to advance. In the semi-finals the Poles defeated Yugoslavia, to get within a win of the gold medal. There they met up against the Soviet Union again, and were dominated 61–45 to instead take silver.

=== 1964 Olympic Games ===
As vice champion of the EuroBasket, at the 1964 Summer Olympics, the Poles came off an impressive start as they finished 3rd out of 8 in the preliminary round. Overall, they finished 6th out of 16, ahead of SFR Yugoslavia, Uruguay and Mexico, which were all major players at the global stage at that time.

=== 1967 World Cup ===
The 1967 World Cup was the first appearance for the national team to compete at the global tournament. The team finished 2–1 in their preliminary group, with victories against Paraguay and Puerto Rico to advance to the final round. There they finished their first ever trip to the World Cup with an subpar 2–4 record, placing 5th in the event.

=== 1968 Olympic Games ===
Just like at the last Summer Olympics in Tokyo, the Poles finished the preliminary round at the 1968 event in Mexico City with a winning record. Overall, they finished 6th out of 16. Just like at the EuroBasket 1967, Poland won against Bulgaria for its closest victory of the tournament.

=== Seventh Heaven (1987-1997) ===
From 1987 to 1997, the national team only managed to qualify for the European Basketball Championship three times out of a possible six. They finished in seventh place in each tournament in 1987, 1991, and 1997. Although after 1997 Poland would fail to qualify for the top European basketball event for the next decade.

=== The 10-year span ===
After years of failed qualifications, Poland finally made their way back to the EuroBasket at the 2007 tournament. It was quite an unexpected achievement for the Poles. But, overall they did not make much noise. Because of injury, many key players including Michał Ignerski and Maciej Lampe did not compete at the event. The Poles lost all 3 games, but even in defeat they remained competitive losing by only 8 to a well-regarded French team and by 9 to the Italian squad.

=== EuroBasket 2009 ===
The White and Red hosted the EuroBasket 2009, making it the first time the national team qualified for consecutive EuroBasket tournaments since the mid 1980s. They got off to an impressive start putting away Bulgaria in the first game 90–78. The team followed that up with another strong performance versus Lithuania 86–75, before dropping their final game in preliminary play against Turkey. With an 2–1 record the team was able to advance to the second round. There, the team came up short in group play with an 1–4 record and a 9th place finish overall at the event.

=== Later years (2009-2019) ===
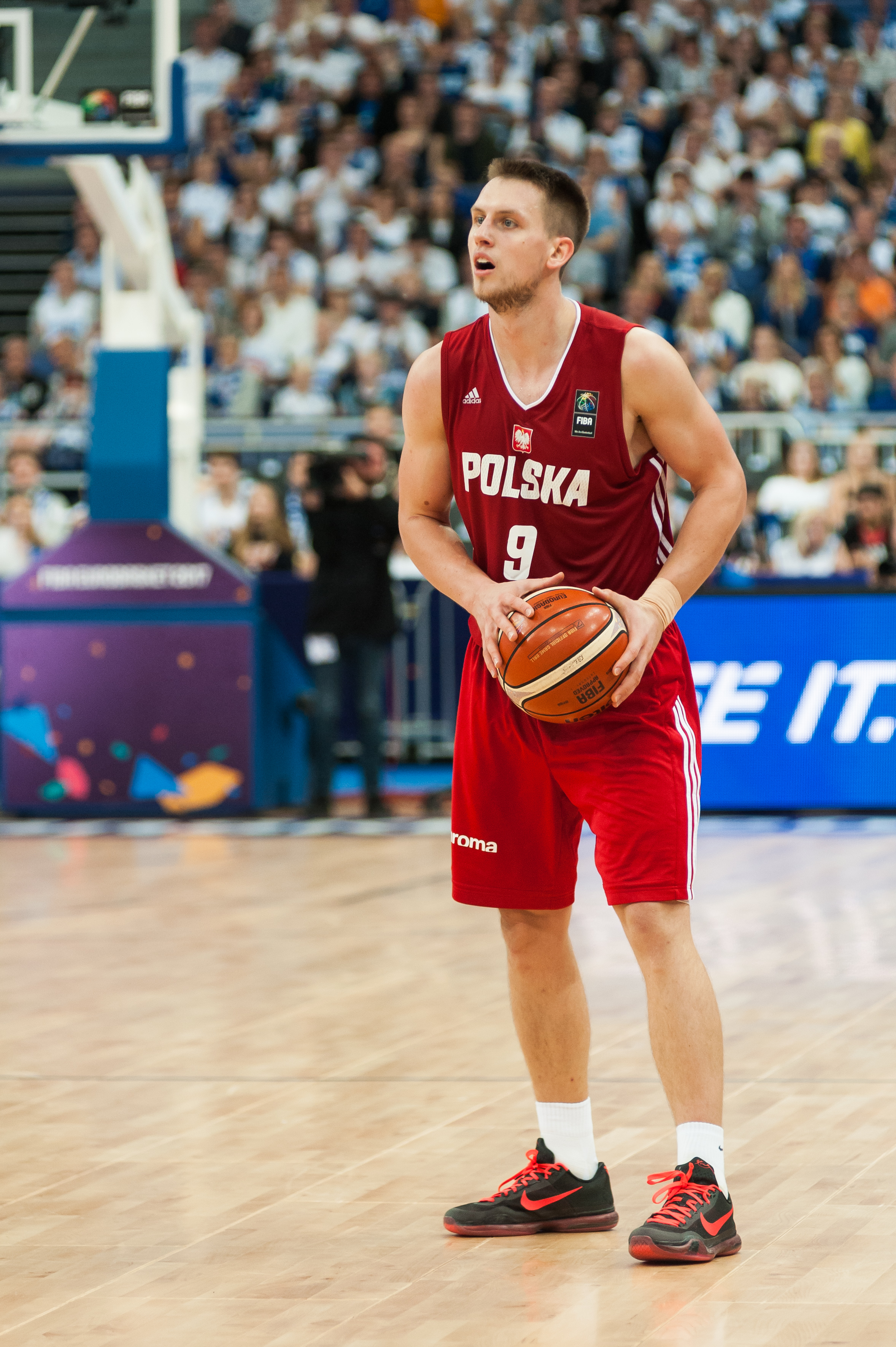
Mateusz Ponitka with Poland during EuroBasket 2017

After 2009, the national team qualified for every EuroBasket in the 2010s. But they could only manage to finish in the top half of the tournament once, that being in 2015.

=== 2019 World Cup ===
In 2019, the national team qualified for the World Cup. It was their first qualification to a global event since 1980 Olympics in Moscow. During the 2019 FIBA World Cup, Poland was put into a group with group favourite China, Ivory Coast, and Venezuela. After a convincing win over Venezuela, Poland upset the hosts 79-76 in front of a max-capacity crowd in Beijing. Poland was down 72-69 with 15 seconds left before Chinese NBA center Zhou Qi made 2 straight turnovers allowing Poland to send the game into overtime. Aaron Cel made a driving layup to put Poland up 78-76 and the upset was sealed when Yi Jianlian missed the game-tying shot. Poland finished 3-0 in their group and moved onto the next round, where they defeated Russia 79-74 before losing to Argentina. In the quarter-finals they faced eventual champions Spain and narrowly lost 90-78, eventually finishing the tournament in 8th place.

=== EuroBasket 2022 ===
At the EuroBasket 2022 qualification, Jeremy Sochan became the youngest player to ever play for Poland's national team. In his very first game, he led Poland over Romania 88-81. He played 29 minutes in which he scored 18 points, including a four-point play (3 pointer plus foul and free throw) at the end and a game-deciding block. The Orly played in Group D held in Prague. Poland started off with a win over co-host Czech Republic by 99-84. But in their second match, they fell back to Finland by 89-59. They later went back strong with their second win over Israel by 85-76. They won in their fourth match against the Netherlands 75-69. But in the fifth and final preliminary match, lost to Serbia by 96-69. In the knockout stage, they started their Final Phase campaign in the Round of 16 with a win over Ukraine by 93-86. In the quarter-finals, they stunned Slovenia by winning 90-87. But in the semi-finals they were unable to catch up and lost to France by 54-95. In the third place match, Poland fell behind to co-host Germany and lost by 69-82. Poland finished fourth in the final standings, it became Poland's strong finish for the first time since 1967.

=== EuroBasket 2025 ===
Poland co-hosted the EuroBasket 2025 after being able to step in for Ukraine. Their group stage matches took place at the Spodek in Katowice. In the group stage, they won against Slovenia, Israel, and Iceland, and lost to France and Belgium. In the knockout stage, they reached the quarter-finals, finishing sixth, thanks to a win over Bosnia and Herzegovina and a loss to Turkey.

== Competitive record ==
=== FIBA World Cup ===
World Cup					Qualification		
Year	Position	Pld	W	L	Pld	W	L
(Argentina) 1950	Did not enter				Did not enter		
(Brazil) 1954	Did not enter				Did not enter		
(Chile) 1959	Did not qualify				EuroBasket served as qualifiers		
(Brazil) 1963	Did not qualify				EuroBasket served as qualifiers		
(Uruguay) 1967	5th	9	4	5	EuroBasket served as qualifiers		
(Socialist Federal Republic of Yugoslavia) 1970	Did not qualify				EuroBasket served as qualifiers		
(Puerto Rico) 1974	Did not qualify				EuroBasket served as qualifiers		
(Philippines) 1978	Did not qualify				EuroBasket served as qualifiers		
(Colombia) 1982	Did not qualify				EuroBasket served as qualifiers		
(Spain) 1986	Did not qualify				6	3	3
(Argentina) 1990	Did not qualify				EuroBasket served as qualifiers		
(Canada) 1994	Did not qualify				EuroBasket served as qualifiers		
(Greece) 1998	Did not qualify				EuroBasket served as qualifiers		
(United States) 2002	Did not qualify				EuroBasket served as qualifiers		
(Japan) 2006	Did not qualify				EuroBasket served as qualifiers		
(Turkey) 2010	Did not qualify				EuroBasket served as qualifiers		
(Spain) 2014	Did not qualify				EuroBasket served as qualifiers		
(China) 2019	8th	8	4	4	12	8	4
(Philippines) (Japan) (Indonesia) 2023	Did not qualify				6	2	4
(Qatar) 2027	To be determined				In progress		
(France) 2031	To be determined				To be determined		
Total	2/19	17	8	9	24	13	11

=== Olympic Games ===
Olympic Games					Qualifying		
Year	Position	Pld	W	L	Pld	W	L
(Nazi Germany) 1936	4th	7	3	4			
(United Kingdom) 1948	Did not enter						
(Finland) 1952	Did not enter						
(Australia) 1956	Did not qualify						
(Italy) 1960	7th	8	3	5	7	6	1
(Japan) 1964	6th	9	5	4	Direct qualification		
(Mexico) 1968	6th	9	5	4	8	5	3
(West Germany) 1972	10th	9	3	6	9	4	5
(Canada) 1976	Did not qualify				5	3	2
(Soviet Union) 1980	7th	7	4	3	10	6	4
(United States) 1984	Did not enter				Did not enter		
(South Korea) 1988	Did not qualify				3	1	2
(Spain) 1992	Did not qualify				6	2	4
(United States) 1996	Did not qualify				Did not qualify		
(Australia) 2000	Did not qualify				Did not qualify		
(Greece) 2004	Did not qualify				Did not qualify		
(China) 2008	Did not qualify				Did not qualify		
(United Kingdom) 2012	Did not qualify				Did not qualify		
(Brazil) 2016	Did not qualify				Did not qualify		
(Japan) 2020	Did not qualify				3	1	2
(France) 2024	Did not qualify				7	5	2
(United States) 2028	To be determined				To be determined		
Total	6/21	49	23	26	58	33	25

=== EuroBasket ===
EuroBasket					Qualification		
Year	Position	Pld	W	L	Pld	W	L
(Switzerland) 1935	Did not enter						
(Latvia) 1937	4th	5	2	3			
(Lithuania) 1939	3rd place, bronze medalist(s)	7	5	2			
(Switzerland) 1946	9th	5	2	3			
(Czechoslovakia) 1947	6th	7	3	4			
(Egypt) 1949	Did not enter						
(France) 1951	Did not enter						
(Soviet Union) 1953	Did not enter						
(Hungary) 1955	5th	11	7	4			
(Bulgaria) 1957	7th	10	3	7			
(Turkey) 1959	6th	8	4	4			
(Socialist Federal Republic of Yugoslavia) 1961	9th	9	5	4			
(Poland) 1963	2nd place, silver medalist(s)	9	7	2	Qualified as host		
(Soviet Union) 1965	3rd place, bronze medalist(s)	9	7	2	Direct qualification		
(Finland) 1967	3rd place, bronze medalist(s)	9	7	2	Direct qualification		
(Italy) 1969	4th	7	3	4	4	4	0
(West Germany) 1971	4th	7	4	3	4	4	0
(Spain) 1973	12th	7	1	6	Direct qualification		
(Socialist Federal Republic of Yugoslavia) 1975	8th	7	3	4	9	7	2
(Belgium) 1977	Did not qualify				8	3	5
(Italy) 1979	7th	8	5	3	8	5	3
(Czechoslovakia) 1981	7th	8	5	3	Direct qualification		
(France) 1983	9th	7	3	4	Direct qualification		
(West Germany) 1985	11th	7	2	5	9	7	2
(Greece) 1987	7th	8	4	4	9	8	1
(Socialist Federal Republic of Yugoslavia) 1989	Did not qualify				6	1	5
(Italy) 1991	7th	5	2	3	10	6	4
(Germany) 1993	Did not qualify				11	4	7
(Greece) 1995	Did not qualify				5	3	2
(Spain) 1997	7th	9	4	5	15	10	5
(France) 1999	Did not qualify				10	4	6
(Turkey) 2001	Did not qualify				10	6	4
(Sweden) 2003	Did not qualify				10	3	7
(Serbia and Montenegro) 2005	Did not qualify				12	2	10
(Spain) 2007	13th	3	0	3	6	4	2
(Poland) 2009	9th	6	2	4	Qualified as host		
(Lithuania) 2011	17th	5	2	3	8	4	4
(Slovenia) 2013	21st	5	1	4	8	6	2
(France) (Croatia) (Germany) (Latvia) 2015	11th	6	3	3	6	5	1
(Finland) (Israel) (Romania) (Turkey) 2017	18th	5	1	4	6	5	1
(Czech Republic) (Georgia (country)) (Italy) (Germany) 2022	4th	9	5	4	6	3	3
(Cyprus) (Finland) (Poland) (Latvia) 2025	6th	7	4	3	12	6	6
(Estonia) (Greece) (Slovenia) (Spain) 2029	To be determined				To be determined		
Total	30/42	215	106	109	192	110	82

== Results and fixtures ==
Win Loss

=== 2025 ===
28 November 2025 2027 FIBA World Cup qualifiers – 1st round	Poland	90–78	Austria	Gdynia, Poland
20:45 (UTC+1)	Scoring by quarter: 22–18, 21–21, 26–21, 21–18
	Pts: Harding 32; Rebs: Ponitka 9 Asts: Harding 5	Boxscore	Pts: Landesberg 20; Rebs: Ogunsipe 8 Asts: Vujošević 6	Arena: Gdynia Arena; Attendance: 3,828; Referees: Martin Horozov (BUL), Carsten Straube (GER), Mehmet Şahin (TUR)

1 December 2025 2027 FIBA World Cup qualifiers – 1st round	Netherlands	83–85	Poland	The Hague, Netherlands
19:30 (UTC+1)	Scoring by quarter: 28–22, 25–15, 17–21, 13–27
	Pts: Franke 26; Rebs: Franke 6 Asts: Van der Vuurst 6	Boxscore	Pts: Ponitka 22; Rebs: Ponitka 9 Asts: Łączyński, Ponitka 4	Arena: Sportcampus Zuiderpark; Attendance: 3,370; Referees: Martin Vulić (CRO), Alberto Sánchez (ESP), Orhan Hekimoğlu (TUR)

=== 2026 ===
27 February 2026 2027 FIBA World Cup qualifiers – 1st round	Latvia	82–84	Poland	Riga, Latvia
19:30 (UTC+2)	Scoring by quarter: 23–21, 25–21, 14–24, 20–18
	Pts: Strautiņš 27; Rebs: Strautiņš 6 Asts: A. Kurucs, Lomažs 3	Boxscore	Pts: Loyd 37; Rebs: Olejniczak 12; Asts: Sokołowski 5	Arena: Xiaomi Arena; Attendance: 10,829; Referees: Ariadna Chueca (ESP), Josip Jurčević (CRO), Tolga Edis (TUR)

1 March 2026 2027 FIBA World Cup qualifiers – 1st round	Poland	92–72	Latvia	Gdynia, Poland
20:30 (UTC+1)	Scoring by quarter: 23–16, 31–20, 16–18, 22–18
	Pts: Loyd 21; Rebs: Sokołowski 8 Asts: Ponitka 8	Boxscore	Pts: Strautiņš 20; Rebs: Blumbergs 6 Asts: three players 4	Arena: Gdynia Arena; Attendance: 4,105; Referees: Antonio Conde (ESP), Péter Praksch (HUN), Geert Jacobs (BEL)

3 July 2026 2027 FIBA World Cup qualifiers – 1st round	Austria	77–123	Poland	Vienna, Austria
18:00 (UTC+2)	Scoring by quarter: 16–24, 12–29, 29–28, 20–42
	Pts: Zeleznik 14; Rebs: Kapic 5 Asts: Jakupović 5	Boxscore	Pts: Kolenda 23; Rebs: Olejniczak 8 Asts: Łączyński 7	Arena: Sport Arena Wien; Attendance: 1,600; Referees: Yener Yılmaz (TUR), Ilias Kounellis (CYP), Nemanja Ninković (SRB)

6 July 2026 2027 FIBA World Cup qualifiers – 1st round	Poland	92–84	Netherlands	Kraków, Poland
18:00 (UTC+2)	Scoring by quarter: 18–16, 28–28, 27–21, 19–19
	Pts: Łączyński 18; Rebs: Olejniczak 9 Asts: Łączyński 5	Boxscore	Pts: Van der Vuurst 26; Rebs: Kuta 7 Asts: Van der Vuurst 9	Arena: Arena Kraków; Attendance: 8,110; Referees: Gintaras Mačiulis (LTU), Zdenko Tomašević (SVK), Ilias Karapanos (GRE)

27 August 2026 2027 FIBA World Cup qualifiers – 2nd round	Israel	86–106	Poland	Riga, Latvia
21:00 (UTC+3)	Scoring by quarter: 15–23, 27–32, 18–25, 26–26
	Pts: Sorkin 26; Rebs: Segev, Sorkin 5 Asts: Blatt 10	Boxscore	Pts: Ponitka 24; Rebs: Sokołowski 7 Asts: Ponitka 9	Arena: Xiaomi Arena; Attendance: 100; Referees: Petar Pešić (SRB), Mihkel Männist (EST), Andrea Bongiorni (ITA)

30 August 2026 2027 FIBA World Cup qualifiers – 2nd round	Poland	94–96(OT)	Germany	Gdańsk, Poland
14:45 (UTC+2)	Scoring by quarter: 15–28, 16–13, 27–29, 25–13, Overtime: 11–13
	Pts: Ponitka 20; Rebs: Olejniczak 12; Asts: Pluta, Ponitka 5	Boxscore	Pts: Schröder 18; Rebs: Thiemann 12; Asts: Schröder 5	Arena: Ergo Arena; Attendance: 10,094; Referees: Ademir Zurapović (BIH), Boris Krejić (SVN), Gintaras Mačiulis (LTU)

27 November 2026 2027 FIBA World Cup qualifiers – 2nd round	Poland	vs.	Croatia	Gliwice, Poland
20:45 (UTC+1)
		Boxscore		Arena: Gliwice Arena

30 November 2026 2027 FIBA World Cup qualifiers – 2nd round	Germany	vs.	Poland	Frankfurt, Germany
19:30 (UTC+1)
		Boxscore		Arena: Süwag Energie ARENA

=== 2027 ===
25 February 2027 2027 FIBA World Cup qualifiers – 2nd round	Poland	vs.	Israel	Poland
--:-- (UTC+1)
		Boxscore

28 February 2027 2027 FIBA World Cup qualifiers – 2nd round	Croatia	vs.	Poland	Croatia
--:-- (UTC+1)
		Boxscore

== Team ==
=== Current roster ===
Roster for the 2027 FIBA World Cup Qualifiers matches on 27 and 30 August 2026 against Israel and Germany.

Poland men's national basketball team roster
Players
Coaches

Pos.	No.	Name	Age – Date of birth	Height	Club	Ctr.
PG	0	Andrzej Pluta Jr.	26 – 3 June 2000	1.90 m (6 ft 3 in)	Girona	(Spain)
PF	1	Jarosław Zyskowski	34 – 16 July 1992	2.03 m (6 ft 8 in)	Arka Gdynia	(Poland)
C	2	Aleksander Balcerowski	25 – 19 November 2000	2.17 m (7 ft 1 in)	Barcelona	(Spain)
SF	3	Michał Sokołowski	33 – 11 December 1992	1.96 m (6 ft 5 in)	Çayırova	(Turkey)
SF	7	Igor Miličić Jr.	24 – 27 August 2002	2.02 m (6 ft 8 in)	Delaware Blue Coats	(United States)
SG	8	Jordan Loyd	33 – 27 July 1993	1.93 m (6 ft 4 in)	Anadolu Efes	(Turkey)
G/F	9	Mateusz Ponitka (C)	32 – 29 August 1993	1.98 m (6 ft 6 in)	Bahçeşehir Koleji	(Turkey)
PG	15	Kamil Łączyński	37 – 17 April 1989	1.83 m (6 ft 0 in)	Arka Gdynia	(Poland)
C	17	Dominik Olejniczak	30 – 1 July 1996	2.13 m (7 ft 0 in)	Derthona	(Italy)
C	21	Szymon Zapała	25 – 9 May 2001	2.13 m (7 ft 0 in)	Trefl Sopot	(Poland)
SF	28	Przemysław Żołnierewicz	31 – 3 July 1995	1.96 m (6 ft 5 in)	King Szczecin	(Poland)
SG	30	Kuba Piśla	21 – 11 September 2004	1.97 m (6 ft 6 in)	GTK Gliwice	(Poland)

Head coach

- (Croatia) / (Poland) Igor Miličić

Assistant coach(es)

- (Poland) Artur Gronek
- (Poland) Marcin Woźniak
- (Croatia) Moris Hadžija

Legend

- (C) Team captain
- Club – describes last
  club before the competition
- Age – describes age
  on 27 August 2026

=== Depth chart ===
Pos.	Starting 5	Bench 1	Bench 2
C	Aleksander Balcerowski	Dominik Olejniczak	Szymon Zapała
PF	Michał Sokołowski	Tomasz Gielo	Aleksander Dziewa
SF	Mateusz Ponitka	Przemysław Żołnierewicz
SG	Jordan Loyd	Michał Michalak
PG	Andrzej Pluta	Kamil Łączyński

== Head coach history ==
- (Estonia) / (Poland) Walenty Kłyszejko – (1936–1939)
- (Poland) Józef Pachla & Mieczysław Piotrowski – (1946)
- (Poland) Józef Pachla – (1947–1948)
- (Estonia) / (Poland) Walenty Kłyszejko & Jerzy Patrzykont – (1949)
- (Poland) Tadeusz Ulatowski – (1950)
- (Poland) Władysław Maleszewski – (1950–1953)
- (Poland) Tadeusz Ulatowski & Jan Rudelski – (1953)
- (Poland) Andrzej Kulesza & Romuald Markowski – (1954)
- (Poland) Władysław Maleszewski & Jerzy Patrzykont – (1955)
- (Poland) Zygmunt Olesiewicz – (1956)
- (Poland) Jan Rudelski – (1957)
- (Poland) Jan Rudelski & Jerzy Patrzykont – (1958)
- (Poland) Zygmunt Olesiewicz & Jerzy Lelonkiewicz – (1959)
- (Poland) Zygmunt Olesiewicz – (1960)
- (Poland) Jerzy Lelonkiewicz – (1961)
- (Poland) Zygmunt Olesiewicz – (1961)
- (Poland) Witold Zagórski – (1961–1975)
- (Poland) Jerzy Świątek – (1977–1979)
- (Poland) Stefan Majer – (1980)
- (Poland) Jerzy Świątek – (1981–1983)
- (Poland) Andrzej Kuchar – (1984–1987)
- (Poland) Arkadiusz Koniecki – (1987–1992)
- (Poland) Tadeusz Aleksandrowicz – (1993)
- (Poland) Eugeniusz Kijewski – (1993–1998)
- (Poland) Piotr Langosz – (1998–2000)
- (Poland) Dariusz Szczubiał – (2000–2003)
- (Poland) Andrzej Kowalczyk – (2003–2004)
- (Serbia) Veselin Matić – (2004–2006)
- (Slovenia) Andrej Urlep – (2006–2008)
- (Israel) Muli Katzurin – (2008–2010)
- (Belarus) / (Poland) Igor Griszczuk – (2010–2011)
- (Slovenia) Aleš Pipan – (2011–2013)
- (Germany) Dirk Bauermann – (2013–2014)
- (United States) Mike Taylor – (2014–2021)
- (Croatia) / (Poland) Igor Miličić – (2021–present)

== Notable players ==
- Marcin Gortat – former NBA player
- Cezary Trybański – former NBA player
- Łukasz Koszarek
- Mateusz Ponitka
- Mieczysław Młynarski
- Mieczysław Łopatka
- Eugeniusz Kijewski
- Edward Jurkiewicz
- Janusz Wichowski
- Adam Waczyński
- Adam Hrycaniuk
- Michał Sokołowski
- Szymon Szewczyk
- Maciej Lampe – former NBA player
- Andrzej Pluta
- Jeremy Sochan – current NBA player for the New York Knicks
- Igor Miličić Jr.
- A J Slaughter
- Przemek Karnowski
- Adam Wójcik
- Jordan Loyd – former NBA player, Toronto Raptors 2019 Champion

Many of the national team players were from abroad; they were naturalized, of Polish descent, or had previously obtained Polish citizenship. Here are the players:

- American-Polish: Joseph McNaull, Eric Elliott, Jeff Nordgaard, David Logan, Thomas Kelati, A.J. Slaughter, Geoffrey Groselle, Luke Petrasek, Jeremy Sochan, Jordan Loyd, Jerrick Harding
- French-Polish: Aaron Cel
- Croatian-Polish: Igor Miličić Jr.

== Past rosters ==
1936 Olympic Games: finished 4th among 21 teams

1 Zdzisław Filipkiewicz, 2 Florian Grzechowiak, 3 Zdzisław Kasprzak, 4 Jakub Kopf, 5 Ewaryst Łój, 6 Janusz Patrzykont, 7 Andrzej Pluciński, 8 Zenon Różycki, 9 Paweł Stok, 10 Edward Szostak (Coach: Walenty Kłyszejko)

1937 EuroBasket: finished 4th among 8 teams

3 Michał Czajczyk, 4 Stefan Gendera, 5 Florian Grzechowiak, 6 Zdzisław Kasprzak, 7 Janusz Patrzykont, 8 Andrzej Pluciński, 9 Zbigniew Resich, 10 Zenon Różycki, 11 Jarosław Śmigielski, 12 Paweł Stok (Coach: Walenty Kłyszejko)

1939 EuroBasket: finished (bronze) among 8 teams

4 Jerzy Gregołajtis, 5 Bohdan Bartosiewicz, 6 Jarosław Śmigielski, 7 Zbigniew Resich, 8 Florian Grzechowiak, 9 Stanisław Pawłowski, 10 Paweł Stok, 11 Jerzy Rossudowski, 12 Zdzislaw Kasprzak, 13 Ewaryst Loj, 14 Włodzimierz Pławczyk (Coach: Walenty Kłyszejko)

1946 EuroBasket: finished 9th among 10 teams

3 Zbigniew Resich, 4 Rościsław Iwanow-Ruszkiewicz, 5 Jacek Arlet, 6 Jarosław Śmigielski, 7 Franciszek Szymura, 8 Florian Grzechowiak, 9 Edward Jarczyński, 10 Paweł Stok, 12 Zdzisław Kasprzak, 14 Władysław Maleszewski (Coach: Józef Pachla)

1947 EuroBasket: finished 6th among 14 teams

3 Józef Żyliński, 4 Ludwik Barszczewski, 5 Bohdan Bartosiewicz, 6 Jacek Arlet, 7 Jerzy Dowgird, 8 Edward Jarczyński, 9 Henryk Jaźnicki, 10 Paweł Stok, 11 Romuald Markowski, 12 Zbigniew Resich, 13 Tadeusz Ulatowski, 14 Władysław Maleszewski (Coach: Józef Pachla)

1955 EuroBasket: finished 5th among 18 teams

3 Leszek Kamiński, 4 Witold Zagórski, 5 Wincent Wawro, 6 Jerzy Sterenga, 7 Mieczysław Feglerski, 8 Jerzy Mlynarczyk, 9 Bohdan Przywarski, 10 Sławomir Złotkiewicz, 11 Jędrzej Bednarowicz, 12 Stefan Wojcik, 13 Andrzej Nartowski, 14 Tadeusz Pacuła, 16 Władysław Pawlak, 17 Ryszard Olszewski (Coach: Władysław Maleszewski)

1957 EuroBasket: finished 7th among 16 teams

3 Wincent Wawro, 4 Janusz Wichowski, 5 Andrzej Pstrokoński, 6 Andrzej Nartowski, 7 Mieczysław Feglerski, 8 Ryszard Olszewski, 9 Krzysztof Sitkowski, 10 Władysław Pawlak, 11 Jerzy Młynarczyk, 12 Stefan Wojcik, 13 Zdzisław Skrzeczkowski, 14 Tadeusz Pacuła (Coach: Władysław Maleszewski)

1959 EuroBasket: finished 6th among 17 teams

3 Jerzy Piskun, 4 Janusz Wichowski, 5 Andrzej Pstrokoński, 6 Andrzej Nartowski, 7 Bohdan Przywarski, 8 Ryszard Olszewski, 9 Krzysztof Sitkowski, 10 Władysław Pawlak, 11 Jerzy Młynarczyk, 12 Zbigniew Dregier, 13 Zenon Matysik, 14 Tadeusz Pacuła (Coach: Zygmunt Olesiewicz)

1960 Olympic Games: finished 7th among 16 teams

3 Jerzy Piskun, 4 Janusz Wichowski, 5 Andrzej Pstrokoński, 6 Andrzej Nartowski, 7 Jerzy Młynarczyk, 8 Ryszard Olszewski, 9 Krzysztof Sitkowski, 10 Mieczysław Łopatka, 11 Bohdan Przywarski, 12 Zbigniew Dregier, 13 Dariusz Świerczewski, 14 Tadeusz Pacuła (Coach: Zygmunt Olesiewicz)

1961 EuroBasket: finished 9th among 19 teams

4 Janusz Wichowski, 5 Andrzej Pstrokoński, 6 Jerzy Piskun, 7 Jerzy Młynarczyk, 8 Ryszard Olszewski, 9 Krzysztof Sitkowski, 10 Władysław Pawlak, 11 Zygmunt Wysocki, 12 Ryszard Niewodowski, 13 Leszek Arent, 14 Andrzej Nartowski, 15 Stanisław Olejniczak (Coach: Witold Zagórski)

1963 EuroBasket: finished (silver) among 16 teams

4 Janusz Wichowski, 5 Andrzej Pstrokoński, 6 Leszek Arent, 7 Wiesław Langiewicz, 8 Stanisław Olejniczak, 9 Krzysztof Sitkowski, 10 Jerzy Piskun, 11 Bohdan Likszo, 12 Mieczysław Łopatka, 13 Kazimierz Frelkiewicz, 14 Andrzej Nartowski, 15 Zbigniew Dregier, (Coach: Witold Zagórski)

1964 Olympic Games: finished 6th among 16 teams

4 Janusz Wichowski, 5 Andrzej Pstrokoński, 6 Tadeusz Blauth, 7 Andrzej Perka, 8 Stanisław Olejniczak, 9 Krzysztof Sitkowski, 10 Jerzy Piskun, 11 Bohdan Likszo, 12 Mieczysław Łopatka, 13 Kazimierz Frelkiewicz, 14 Krystian Czernichowski, 15 Zbigniew Dregier (Coach: Witold Zagórski)

1965 EuroBasket: finished (bronze) among 16 teams

4 Janusz Wichowski, 5 Andrzej Pstrokoński, 6 Czesław Malec, 7 Andrzej Perka, 8 Stanisław Olejniczak, 9 Wiesław Langiewicz, 10 Jerzy Piskun, 11 Bohdan Likszo, 12 Mieczysław Łopatka, 13 Kazimierz Frelkiewicz, 14 Edward Grzywna, 15 Zbigniew Dregier (Coach: Witold Zagórski)

1967 FIBA World Cup: finished 5th among 13 teams

4 Janusz Wichowski, 5 Włodzimierz Trams, 6 Czesław Malec, 7 Henryk Cegielski, 8 Igor Oleszkiewicz, 9 Wiesław Langiewicz, 10 Andrzej Chmarzynski, 11 Bohdan Likszo, 12 Mieczysław Łopatka, 13 Kazimierz Frelkiewicz, 14 Bolesław Kwiatkowski, 15 Zbigniew Dregier (Coach: Witold Zagórski)

1967 EuroBasket: finished (bronze) among 16 teams

4 Mirosław Kuczyński, 5 Włodzimierz Trams, 6 Czesław Malec, 7 Henryk Cegielski, 8 Maciej Chojnacki, 9 Waldemar Kozak, 10 Grzegorz Korcz, 11 Bohdan Likszo, 12 Mieczysław Łopatka, 13 Kazimierz Frelkiewicz, 14 Bolesław Kwiatkowski, 15 Zbigniew Dregier (Coach: Witold Zagórski)

1968 Olympic Games: finished 6th among 16 teams

4 Grzegorz Korcz, 5 Włodzimierz Trams, 6 Czesław Malec, 7 Henryk Cegielski, 8 Andrzej Kasprzak, 9 Edward Jurkiewicz, 10 Adam Niemiec, 11 Bohdan Likszo, 12 Mieczysław Łopatka, 13 Kazimierz Frelkiewicz, 14 Bolesław Kwiatkowski, 15 Andrzej Pasiorowski (Coach: Witold Zagórski)

1969 EuroBasket: finished 4th among 12 teams

4 Marek Ladniak, 5 Włodzimierz Trams, 6 Jan Dolczewski, 7 Henryk Cegielski, 8 Andrzej Seweryn, 9 Edward Jurkiewicz, 10 Adam Niemiec, 11 Bohdan Likszo, 12 Waldemar Kozak, 13 Bolesław Kwiatkowski, 14 Krzysztof Gula, 15 Grzegorz Korcz (Coach: Witold Zagórski)

1971 EuroBasket: finished 4th among 12 teams

4 Marek Ladniak, 5 Grzegorz Korcz, 6 Jan Dolczewski, 7 Henryk Cegielski, 8 Andrzej Seweryn, 9 Edward Jurkiewicz, 10 Jerzy Frolow, 11 Janusz Cegliński, 12 Waldemar Kozak, 13 Mirosław Kalinowski, 14 Eugeniusz Durejko, 15 Zbigniew Jedlinski (Coach: Witold Zagórski)

1972 Olympic Games: finished 10th among 16 teams

4 Andrzej Pasiorowski, 5 Grzegorz Korcz, 6 Jan Dolczewski, 7 Franciszek Niemiec, 8 Andrzej Seweryn, 9 Waldemar Kozak, 10 Andrzej Kasprzak, 11 Janusz Cegliński, 12 Mieczysław Łopatka, 13 Ryszard Białowąs, 14 Eugeniusz Durejko, 15 Piotr Langosz (Coach: Witold Zagórski)

1973 EuroBasket: finished 12th among 12 teams

4 Andrzej Pasiorowski, 5 Grzegorz Korcz, 6 Jan Dolczewski, 7 Jerzy Plebanek, 8 Andrzej Seweryn, 9 Tomasz Tybinkowski, 10 Tadeusz Grygiel, 11 Janusz Cegliński, 12 Jacek Kalinowski, 13 Zdzisław Myrda, 14 Eugeniusz Durejko, 15 Piotr Langosz (Coach: Witold Zagórski)

1975 EuroBasket: finished 8th among 12 teams

4 Tadeusz Grygiel, 5 Tomasz Garlinski, 6 Piotr Langosz, 7 Franciszek Niemiec, 8 Andrzej Seweryn, 9 Edward Jurkiewicz, 10 Adam Gardzina, 11 Wojciech Fiedorczuk, 12 Marek Ladniak, 13 Zdzisław Myrda, 14 Eugeniusz Durejko, 15 Dariusz Kwiatkowski (Coach: Witold Zagórski)

1979 EuroBasket: finished 7th among 12 teams

4 Dariusz Zelig, 5 Zbigniew Kudlacz, 6 Wojciech Rosiński, 7 Eugeniusz Kijewski, 8 Andrzej Seweryn, 9 Tomasz Garlinski, 10 Leszek Chudeusz, 11 Justyn Węglorz, 12 Mieczysław Młynarski, 13 Zdzisław Myrda, 14 Ryszard Prostak, 15 Krzysztof Fikiel (Coach: Jerzy Świątek)

1980 Olympic Games: finished 7th among 12 teams

4 Dariusz Zelig, 5 Leszek Doliński, 6 Wojciech Rosiński, 7 Eugeniusz Kijewski, 8 Jerzy Bińkowski, 9 Marcin Michalski, 10 Ireneusz Mulak, 11 Justyn Węglorz, 12 Mieczysław Młynarski, 13 Zdzisław Myrda, 14 Ryszard Prostak, 15 Krzysztof Fikiel (Coach: Stefan Majer)

1981 EuroBasket: finished 7th among 12 teams

4 Dariusz Zelig, 5 Dariusz Szczubial, 6 Wojciech Rosinski, 7 Eugeniusz Kijewski, 8 Zbigniew Bogucki, 9 Jerzy Binkowski, 10 Miroslaw Boryca, 11 Justyn Weglorz, 12 Mieczyslaw Mlynarski, 13 Jaroslaw Jechorek, 14 Ryszard Prostak, 15 Krzysztof Fikiel (Coach: Jerzy Świątek)

1983 EuroBasket: finished 9th among 12 teams

4 Dariusz Zelig, 5 Stanisław Reschke, 6 Stanisław Kiełbik, 7 Eugeniusz Kijewski, 8 Jarosław Jęchorek, 9 Jerzy Bińkowski, 10 Ireneusz Mulak, 11 Justyn Węglorz, 12 Mieczysław Młynarski, 13 Zbigniew Bogucki, 14 Ryszard Prostak, 15 Krzysztof Fikiel (Coach: Jerzy Świątek)

1985 EuroBasket: finished 11th among 12 teams

4 Dariusz Zelig, 5 Dariusz Szczubiał, 6 Andrzej Żurawski, 7 Marek Sobczyński, 8 Jarosław Jęchorek, 9 Jerzy Bińkowski, 10 Ireneusz Mulak, 11 Justyn Węglorz, 12 Adam Fiedler, 13 Henryk Wardach, 14 Jarosław Zyskowski, 15 Krzysztof Fikiel (Coach: Andrzej Kuchar)

1987 EuroBasket: finished 7th among 12 teams

4 Dariusz Zelig, 5 Ryszard Prostak, 6 Mirosław Boryca, 7 Marek Sobczyński, 8 Jarosław Jęchorek, 9 Jerzy Bińkowski, 10 Dariusz Szczubiał, 11 Dariusz Kobylański, 12 Adam Fiedler, 13 Jerzy Kołodziejczak, 14 Henryk Wardach, 15 Krzysztof Fikiel (Coach: Andrzej Kuchar)

1991 EuroBasket: finished 7th among 8 teams

4 Dariusz Zelig, 5 Maciej Zieliński, 6 Wojciech Królik, 7 Piotr Baran, 8 Jarosław Marcinkowski, 9 Jerzy Bińkowski, 10 Dariusz Szczubiał, 11 Adam Wójcik, 12 Jarosław Jechorek, 13 Jacek Duda, 14 Mariusz Bacik, 15 Tomasz Torgowski (Coach: Arkadiusz Koniecki)

1997 EuroBasket: finished 7th among 16 teams

4 Robert Kościuk, 5 Andrzej Pluta, 6 Krzysztof Mila, 7 Jarosław Darnikowski, 8 Dominik Tomczyk, 9 Maciej Zieliński, 10 Adam Wójcik, 11 Tomasz Jankowski, 12 Piotr Szybilski, 13 Rafał Bigus, 14 Mariusz Bacik, 15 Krzysztof Dryja (Coach: Eugeniusz Kijewski)

2007 EuroBasket: finished 13th among 16 teams

4 Bartłomiej Wołoszyn, 5 Andrzej Pluta, 6 Robert Skibniewski, 7 Robert Witka, 8 Filip Dylewicz, 9 Radosław Hyży, 10 Adam Wójcik, 11 Kamil Pietras, 12 Szymon Szewczyk, 13 Iwo Kitzinger, 14 Przemysław Frasunkiewicz, 15 Łukasz Koszarek (Coach: Andrej Urlep)

2009 EuroBasket: finished 9th among 16 teams

4 Maciej Lampe, 5 Krzysztof Roszyk, 6 Michał Chyliński, 7 Krzysztof Szubarga, 8 Robert Skibniewski, 9 Szymon Szewczyk, 10 Adam Wójcik, 11 Michał Ignerski, 12 David Logan, 13 Marcin Gortat, 14 Robert Witka, 15 Łukasz Koszarek (Coach: Muli Katzurin)

2011 EuroBasket: finished 17th among 24 teams

4 Dardan Berisha, 5 Adam Łapeta, 6 Robert Skibniewski, 7 Adam Waczyński, 8 Piotr Pamuła, 9 Paweł Leończyk, 10 Szymon Szewczyk, 11 Thomas Kelati, 12 Piotr Szczotka, 13 Łukasz Wiśniewski, 14 Adam Hrycaniuk, 15 Łukasz Koszarek (Coach: Aleš Pipan)

2013 EuroBasket: finished 21st among 24 teams

4 Przemysław Karnowski, 5 Thomas Kelati, 6 Maciej Lampe, 7 Krzysztof Szubarga, 8 Michał Chyliński, 9 Przemysław Zamojski, 10 Mateusz Ponitka, 11 Michał Ignerski, 12 Adam Waczyński, 13 Marcin Gortat, 14 Adam Hrycaniuk, 15 Łukasz Koszarek (Coach: Dirk Bauermann)

2015 EuroBasket: finished 11th among 24 teams

0 Aleksander Czyż, 5 Aaron Cel, 6 A. J. Slaughter, 7 Damian Kulig, 10 Mateusz Ponitka, 12 Adam Waczyński, 13 Marcin Gortat (C), 15 Łukasz Koszarek, 17 Przemysław Zamojski, 24 Przemysław Karnowski, 33 Karol Gruszecki, 66 Robert Skibniewski (Coach: Mike Taylor)

2017 EuroBasket: finished 18th among 24 teams

3 Michał Sokołowski, 5 Aaron Cel, 6 A. J. Slaughter, 7 Damian Kulig, 8 Przemysław Zamojski, 9 Mateusz Ponitka, 12 Adam Waczyński, 15 Łukasz Koszarek, 21 Tomasz Gielo, 24 Przemek Karnowski, 33 Karol Gruszecki, 34 Adam Hrycaniuk (Coach: Mike Taylor)

2019 FIBA World Cup: finished 8th among 32 teams

2 Aleksander Balcerowski, 3 Michał Sokołowski, 5 Aaron Cel, 6 A. J. Slaughter, 9 Mateusz Ponitka, 12 Adam Waczyński, 13 Dominik Olejniczak, 15 Kamil Łączyński, 33 Karol Gruszecki, 34 Adam Hrycaniuk, 55 Łukasz Koszarek, 77 Damian Kulig (Coach: Mike Taylor)

2022 EuroBasket: finished 4th among 24 teams

1 Jarosław Zyskowski, 2 Aleksander Balcerowski, 3 Michał Sokołowski, 5 Aaron Cel, 6 A. J. Slaughter, 9 Mateusz Ponitka (C), 10 Łukasz Kolenda, 11 Aleksander Dziewa, 13 Dominik Olejniczak, 23 Michał Michalak, 30 Jakub Garbacz, 55 Jakub Schenk (Coach: Igor Miličić)

2025 EuroBasket: finished 6th among 24 teams

0 Andrzej Pluta, 2 Aleksander Balcerowski, 3 Michał Sokołowski, 8 Jordan Loyd, 9 Mateusz Ponitka (C), 10 Szymon Zapala,
11 Aleksander Dziewa, 12 Tomasz Gielo, 15 Kamil Łączyński, 17 Dominik Olejniczak, 23 Michał Michalak, 28 Przemysław Żołnierewicz (Coach: Igor Miličić)

== Kit ==
=== Manufacturer ===
- 2011: Spalding
- 2013–15: Zina
- 2016–2021: Adidas
- 2022–2025: 4F
- 2026-present: Adidas

=== Sponsor ===
- 2011: Prokom
- 2013: Lotto
- 2015: Tauron
- 2017: Energa

== See also ==
- Sport in Poland
- Poland women's national basketball team
- Poland men's national under-20 basketball team
- Poland men's national under-19 basketball team
- Poland men's national under-17 basketball team
- Poland men's national 3x3 team
