= EuroBasket 1969 =

International basketball event

Campionato europeo maschile di pallacanestro 1969

Tournament details
- Host country: Italy
- Cities: Caserta and Naples
- Dates: 27 September – 5 October
- Teams: 12
- Venues: 2 (in 2 host cities)

Final positions
- Champions: Soviet Union (10th title)
- Runners-up: Yugoslavia
- Third place: Czechoslovakia
- Fourth place: Poland

Tournament statistics
- MVP: (Soviet Union) Sergei Belov
- Top scorer: (Greece) Giorgos Kolokithas (23.0 points per game)

The 1969 FIBA European Championship, commonly called FIBA EuroBasket 1969, was the sixteenth FIBA EuroBasket regional basketball championship, held by FIBA Europe.

== First round ==
=== Group A – Caserta ===
Yugoslavia	Greece	98–62
Hungary	Soviet Union	63–95
Bulgaria	Sweden	87–70
Bulgaria	Hungary	66–65
Sweden	Yugoslavia	43–115
Greece	Soviet Union	63–83
Soviet Union	Sweden	91–47
Greece	Hungary	50–50 aet. 58–59
Yugoslavia	Bulgaria	76–60
Hungary	Yugoslavia	56–85
Soviet Union	Bulgaria	85–62
Greece	Sweden	88–76
Bulgaria	Greece	84–67
Soviet Union	Yugoslavia	61–73
Sweden	Hungary	76–92

Pos.	Team	Matches	Wins	Losses	Results	Points	Diff.
1.	Yugoslavia	5	5	0	447:282	10	+165
2.	Soviet Union	5	4	1	415:308	8	+107
3.	Bulgaria	5	2	3	359:363	4	−24
4.	Hungary	5	2	3	335:380	4	−45
5.	Greece	5	1	4	338:400	2	−62
6.	Sweden	5	1	4	312:473	2	−141

=== Group B – Naples ===
Italy	Spain	65–53
Israel	Poland	78–92
Czechoslovakia	Romania	72–70
Czechoslovakia	Israel	90–82
Romania	Italy	62–74
Poland	Spain	79–78
Romania	Israel	75–74
Italy	Poland	54–55
Spain	Czechoslovakia	60–97
Romania	Spain	63–78
Israel	Italy	66–79
Poland	Czechoslovakia	60–75
Poland	Romania	63–95
Italy	Czechoslovakia	62–63
Spain	Israel	90–81

Pos.	Team	Matches	Wins	Losses	Results	Points	Diff.
1.	Czechoslovakia	5	5	0	397:334	10	+63
2.	Poland	5	3	2	349:380	6	−31
3.	Italy	5	3	2	334:299	6	+35
4.	Spain	5	2	3	359:385	4	−26
5.	Romania	5	2	3	365:361	4	+4
6.	Israel	5	0	5	381:426	0	−45

== Knockout stage ==
=== Places 9 – 12 in Naples ===
Team 1	Team 2	Res.
Greece	Israel	95–62
Sweden	Romania	84–95

=== Places 5 – 8 in Naples ===
Team 1	Team 2	Res.
Bulgaria	Spain	75–78
Hungary	Italy	60–78

=== Places 1 – 4 in Naples ===
Team 1	Team 2	Res.
Yugoslavia	Poland	76–74
Soviet Union	Czechoslovakia	83–69

=== Finals – all games in Naples ===
Placement	Team 1	Team 2	Res.
11th place	Sweden	Israel	83–92
9th place	Greece	Romania	81–87
7th place	Bulgaria	Hungary	92–48
5th place	Spain	Italy	71–66
3rd place	Czechoslovakia	Poland	77–75
Final	Soviet Union	Yugoslavia	81–72

1969 FIBA EuroBasket champions

Soviet Union
Tenth title

== Final standings ==
1. Soviet Union
2. Yugoslavia
3. Czechoslovakia
4. Poland
5. Spain
6. Italy
7. Bulgaria
8. Hungary
9. Romania
10. Greece
11. Israel
12. Sweden

== Awards ==
1969 FIBA EuroBasket MVP: Sergey Belov ( Soviet Union)

All-Tournament Team
(Soviet Union) Sergei Belov (MVP)
(Socialist Federal Republic of Yugoslavia) Ivo Daneu
(Poland) Edward Jurkiewicz
(Spain) Clifford Luyk
(Socialist Federal Republic of Yugoslavia) Krešimir Ćosić

== Team rosters ==
1. Soviet Union: Sergei Belov, Alexander Belov, Modestas Paulauskas, Gennadi Volnov, Priit Tomson, Anatoly Polivoda, Zurab Sakandelidze, Vladimir Andreev, Aleksander Kulkov, Aleksander Boloshev, Sergei Kovalenko, Vitali Zastukhov (Coach: Alexander Gomelsky)

2. Yugoslavia: Krešimir Ćosić, Ivo Daneu, Nikola Plećaš, Vinko Jelovac, Damir Šolman, Rato Tvrdić, Ljubodrag Simonović, Trajko Rajković, Dragutin Čermak, Dragan Kapičić, Vladimir Cvetković, Zoran Marojević (Coach: Ranko Žeravica)

3. Czechoslovakia: Jiří Zídek Sr., Vladimir Pistelak, Jiří Zedníček, Frantisek Konvicka, Jiri Ruzicka, Jiri Ammer, Jan Bobrovsky, Robert Mifka, Karel Baroch, Jiri Konopasek, Petr Novicky, Jan Blažek (Coach: Nikolaj Ordnung)

4. Poland: Bohdan Likszo, Edward Jurkiewicz, Bolesław Kwiatkowski, Włodzimierz Trams, Andrzej Seweryn, Grzegorz Korcz, Waldemar Kozak, Henryk Cegielski, Jan Dolczewski, Marek Ladniak, Adam Niemiec, Krzysztof Gula (Coach: Witold Zagórski)
