= EuroBasket 1971 =

International basketball event

Basketball-Europameisterschaft 1971

Tournament details
- Host country: West Germany
- Cities: Essen and Böblingen
- Dates: 10–19 September
- Teams: 12
- Venues: 2 (in 2 host cities)

Final positions
- Champions: Soviet Union (11th title)
- Runners-up: Yugoslavia
- Third place: Italy
- Fourth place: Poland

Tournament statistics
- MVP: (Socialist Federal Republic of Yugoslavia) Krešimir Ćosić
- Top scorer: (Poland) Edward Jurkiewicz (22.0 points per game)

The 1971 FIBA European Championship, commonly called FIBA EuroBasket 1971, was the seventeenth FIBA EuroBasket regional basketball championship, held by FIBA Europe.

== Venues ==
Essen	Böblingen
Grugahalle; Capacity 10,000	Sporthalle; Capacity 8,000

== First round ==
=== Group A – Essen ===
France	Spain	66–79
Romania	Soviet Union	55–83
Poland	West Germany	78–73
Romania	France	65–64
Spain	Poland	70–83
Soviet Union	West Germany	91–54
Poland	France	91–65
Romania	West Germany	79–69
Soviet Union	Spain	118–58
Romania	Poland	74–80
Soviet Union	France	75–63
Spain	West Germany	73–69
Soviet Union	Poland	94–73
Romania	Spain	76–72
France	West Germany	64–88

Pos.	Team	Matches	Wins	Losses	Results	Points	Diff.
1.	Soviet Union	5	5	0	461:303	10	+158
2.	Poland	5	4	1	405:376	8	+24
3.	Romania	5	3	2	349:368	6	−19
4.	Spain	5	2	3	352:412	4	−60
5.	West Germany	5	1	4	353:385	2	−32
6.	France	5	0	5	322:398	0	−76

=== Group B – Böblingen ===
Israel	Italy	68–87
Czechoslovakia	Turkey	88–69
Yugoslavia	Bulgaria	70–69
Turkey	Israel	97–88
Czechoslovakia	Yugoslavia	66–81
Italy	Bulgaria	78–69
Turkey	Yugoslavia	63–86
Israel	Bulgaria	75–98
Italy	Czechoslovakia	74–60
Bulgaria	Czechoslovakia	85–74
Israel	Yugoslavia	92–118
Turkey	Italy	53–67
Israel	Czechoslovakia	85–113
Bulgaria	Turkey	87–60
Yugoslavia	Italy	79–68

Pos.	Team	Matches	Wins	Losses	Results	Points	Diff.
1.	Yugoslavia	5	5	0	434:358	10	+76
2.	Italy	5	4	1	374:329	8	+45
3.	Bulgaria	5	3	2	408:357	6	+51
4.	Czechoslovakia	5	2	3	401:394	4	+7
5.	Turkey	5	1	4	342:416	2	−74
6.	Israel	5	0	5	408:513	0	−105

== Knockout stage ==
=== Places 9 – 12 in Essen ===
Team 1	Team 2	Res.
West Germany	Israel	99–76
France	Turkey	82–60

=== Places 5 – 8 in Essen ===
Team 1	Team 2	Res.
Spain	Bulgaria	84–95
Romania	Czechoslovakia	74–87

=== Places 1 – 4 in Essen ===
Team 1	Team 2	Res.
Poland	Yugoslavia	75–100
Soviet Union	Italy	93–66

=== Finals – all games in Essen ===
Placement	Team 1	Team 2	Res.
11th place	Turkey	Israel	74–84
9th place	France	West Germany	70–76
7th place	Spain	Romania	86–71
5th place	Bulgaria	Czechoslovakia	76–99
3rd place	Italy	Poland	85–67
Final	Soviet Union	Yugoslavia	69–64

1971 FIBA EuroBasket champions

Soviet Union
11th title

== Final standings ==
1. Soviet Union
2. Yugoslavia
3. Italy
4. Poland
5. Czechoslovakia
6. Bulgaria
7. Spain
8. Romania
9. West Germany
10. France
11. Israel
12. Turkey

== Awards ==
1971 FIBA EuroBasket MVP: Krešimir Ćosić ( (Socialist Federal Republic of Yugoslavia) Yugoslavia)

All-Tournament Team
(Soviet Union) Sergei Belov
(Soviet Union) Modestas Paulauskas
(Poland) Edward Jurkiewicz
(Socialist Federal Republic of Yugoslavia) Krešimir Ćosić (MVP)
(Bulgaria) Atanas Golomeev

== Team rosters ==
1. Soviet Union: Sergei Belov, Alexander Belov, Modestas Paulauskas, Anatoly Polivoda, Vladimir Andreev, Priit Tomson, Ivan Edeshko, Alzhan Zharmukhamedov, Zurab Sakandelidze, Mikheil Korkia, Aleksander Boloshev, Aleksei Tammiste (Coach: Vladimir Kondrashin)

2. Yugoslavia: Krešimir Ćosić, Nikola Plećaš, Aljoša Žorga, Vinko Jelovac, Ljubodrag Simonović, Dragutin Čermak, Borut Bassin, Dragan Kapičić, Blagoja Georgievski, Žarko Knežević, Dragiša Vučinić, Davor Rukavina (Coach: Ranko Žeravica)

3. Italy: Dino Meneghin, Pierluigi Marzorati, Massimo Masini, Ivan Bisson, Renzo Bariviera, Carlo Recalcati, Ottorino Flaborea, Marino Zanatta, Giulio Iellini, Giorgio Giomo, Luigi Serafini, Massimo Cosmelli (Coach: Giancarlo Primo)

4. Poland: Edward Jurkiewicz, Grzegorz Korcz, Andrzej Seweryn, Jan Dolczewski, Henryk Cegielski, Marek Ladniak, Jerzy Frolow, Janusz Ceglinski, Waldemar Kozak, Miroslaw Kalinowski, Eugeniusz Durejko, Zbigniew Jedlinski (Coach: Witold Zagórski)
