= EuroBasket 1965 =

International basketball event

Чемпионат Европы по баскетболу 1965

Tournament details
- Host country: Soviet Union
- City: Moscow and Tbilisi
- Dates: 30 May – 10 June
- Teams: 16
- Venues: 2 (in 2 host cities)

Final positions
- Champions: Soviet Union (8th title)
- Runners-up: Yugoslavia
- Third place: Poland
- Fourth place: Italy

Tournament statistics
- MVP: (Soviet Union) Modestas Paulauskas
- Top scorer: (Socialist Federal Republic of Yugoslavia) Radivoj Korać (21.9 points per game)

The 1965 FIBA European Championship, commonly called FIBA EuroBasket 1965, was the fourteenth FIBA EuroBasket regional basketball championship, held by FIBA Europe.

== Venues ==
Moscow	Tbilisi
Palace of Sports of the Central Lenin Stadium; Capacity 15 000	Tbilisi Sports Palace; Capacity 11 000

== Results ==
=== First round ===
==== Group A ====
Pos	Team	Pld	W	L	PF	PA	PD	Pts	Qualification
1	Soviet Union	7	7	0	546	370	+176	14	Qualified for the semifinals
2	Italy	7	5	2	487	466	+21	12 (Note: Italy–Czechoslovakia 78–69)	Qualified for the semifinals
3	Czechoslovakia	7	5	2	522	443	+79	12	Qualified for the 5th–8th place playoffs
4	Israel	7	4	3	393	439	−46	11	Qualified for the 5th–8th place playoffs
5	Finland	7	3	4	394	458	−64	10	Qualified for the 9th–12th place playoffs
6	East Germany	7	2	5	389	454	−65	9 (Note: East Germany–Romania 59–55)	Qualified for the 9th–12th place playoffs
7	Romania	7	2	5	477	464	+13	9	Qualified for the 13th–16th place playoffs
8	Hungary	7	0	7	364	478	−114	7	Qualified for the 13th–16th place playoffs

Source: FIBA Archives
Rules for classification: 1) Points; 2) Head-to-head results; 3) Points difference; 4) Points scored; 5) Drawing of lots.
Notes:

30 May 1965 Match 1	Hungary	49–60	Israel	Moscow
				Arena: Luzhniki Palace of Sports

30 May 1965 Match 2	Finland	61–85	Romania	Moscow
				Arena: Luzhniki Palace of Sports

30 May 1965 Match 3	East Germany	55–73	Czechoslovakia	Moscow
				Arena: Luzhniki Palace of Sports

30 May 1965 Match 4	Soviet Union	87–48	Italy	Moscow
				Arena: Luzhniki Palace of Sports

31 May 1965 Match 5	East Germany	59–63OT	Finland	Moscow
				Arena: Luzhniki Palace of Sports

31 May 1965 Match 6	Hungary	52–76	Romania	Moscow
				Arena: Luzhniki Palace of Sports

31 May 1965 Match 7	Soviet Union	88–50	Israel	Moscow
				Arena: Luzhniki Palace of Sports

31 May 1965 Match 8	Italy	78–69	Czechoslovakia	Moscow
				Arena: Luzhniki Palace of Sports

1 June 1965 Match 9	Israel	59–57	Romania	Moscow
				Arena: Luzhniki Palace of Sports

1 June 1965 Match 10	Italy	59–60	Finland	Moscow
				Arena: Luzhniki Palace of Sports

1 June 1965 Match 11	Hungary	55–56	East Germany	Moscow
				Arena: Luzhniki Palace of Sports

1 June 1965 Match 12	Soviet Union	79–74	Czechoslovakia	Moscow
				Arena: Luzhniki Palace of Sports

Israel	East Germany	56–55
Czechoslovakia	Finland	68–40
Italy	Hungary	66–64
Soviet Union	Romania	62–60
Czechoslovakia	Hungary	77–53
Israel	Italy	47–68
Soviet Union	Finland	89–52
Romania	East Germany	55–59
Czechoslovakia	Israel	61–61 aet. 71–69
Romania	Italy	73–73 aet. 75–81
Soviet Union	East Germany	65–41
Finland	Hungary	67–46
Finland	Israel	51–52
Romania	Czechoslovakia	59–90
East Germany	Italy	64–87
Soviet Union	Hungary	76–45

==== Group B – Tbilisi ====
Bulgaria	West Germany	74–57
Sweden	Greece	69–71
Yugoslavia	France	80–54
Poland	Spain	82–57
Spain	West Germany	86–58
Bulgaria	Sweden	113–56
Yugoslavia	Greece	76–68
Poland	France	72–53
France	Greece	63–64
Poland	West Germany	92–64
Spain	Sweden	78–74
Yugoslavia	Bulgaria	89–69
West Germany	Sweden	72–49
France	Bulgaria	67–70
Poland	Greece	74–62
Spain	Yugoslavia	65–113
Poland	Sweden	83–41
West Germany	Yugoslavia	56–115
Greece	Bulgaria	65–59
France	Spain	77–90
West Germany	France	47–74
Sweden	Yugoslavia	46–91
Greece	Spain	89–82
Poland	Bulgaria	75–63
Greece	West Germany	81–72
Sweden	France	61–90
Bulgaria	Spain	79–56
Poland	Yugoslavia	69–78

Pos.	Team	Matches	Wins	Losses	Results	Points	Diff.
1.	Yugoslavia	7	7	0	642:427	14	+215
2.	Poland	7	6	1	557:418	12	+129
3.	Greece	7	5	2	500:495	10	+5
4.	Bulgaria	7	4	3	527:465	8	+62
5.	Spain	7	3	4	514:572	6	−58
6.	France	7	2	5	478:484	4	−6
7.	West Germany	7	1	6	426:571	2	−145
8.	Sweden	7	0	7	396:608	0	−212

=== Knockout Stage ===
==== Places 13 – 16 ====
Team 1	Team 2	Res.
Sweden	Romania	60–86
West Germany	Hungary	53–52

==== Places 9 – 12 ====
Team 1	Team 2	Res.
France	Finland	52–42
Spain	East Germany	69–69 aet. 76–78

==== Places 5 – 8 ====
Team 1	Team 2	Res.
Bulgaria	Czechoslovakia	77–70
Greece	Israel	67–69

==== Places 1 – 4 ====
Team 1	Team 2	Res.
Poland	Soviet Union	61–75
Yugoslavia	Italy	83–82

==== Finals ====
Placement	Team 1	Team 2	Res.
15th place	Sweden	Hungary	66–79
13th place	Romania	West Germany	74–63
11th place	Finland	Spain	58–65
9th place	France	East Germany	66–57
7th place	Czechoslovakia	Greece	116–71
5th place	Bulgaria	Israel	63–51
3rd place	Poland	Italy	86–70
Final	Soviet Union	Yugoslavia	58–49

1965 FIBA EuroBasket champions

Soviet Union
8th title

== Final standings ==
1. Soviet Union
2. Yugoslavia
3. Poland
4. Italy
5. Bulgaria
6. Israel
7. Czechoslovakia
8. Greece
9. France
10. East Germany
11. Spain
12. Finland
13. Romania
14. West Germany
15. Hungary
16. Sweden

== Awards ==
1965 FIBA EuroBasket MVP: Modestas Paulauskas ( Soviet Union)

== Team rosters ==
1. Soviet Union: Gennadi Volnov, Modestas Paulauskas, Jaak Lipso, Armenak Alachachian, Aleksander Travin, Aleksander Petrov, Zurab Sakandelidze, Viacheslav Khrinin, Visvaldis Eglitis, Nikolai Baglei, Nikolai Sushak, Amiran Skhiereli (Coach: Alexander Gomelsky)
2. Yugoslavia: Radivoj Korać, Ivo Daneu, Petar Skansi, Slobodan Gordić, Trajko Rajković, Josip Đerđa, Nemanja Đurić, Vital Eiselt, Miloš Bojović, Dragan Kovačić, Zvonko Petričević, Dragoslav Ražnatović (Coach: Aleksandar Nikolić)
3. Poland: Mieczyslaw Lopatka, Bohdan Likszo, Andrzej Pstrokonski, Janusz Wichowski, Zbigniew Dregier, Kazimierz Frelkiewicz, Edward Grzywna, Wieslaw Langiewicz, Czeslaw Malec, Stanislaw Olejniczak, Andrzej Perka, Jerzy Piskun (Coach: Witold Zagórski)
4. Italy: Massimo Masini, Giambattista Cescutti, Ottorino Flaborea, Gabriele Vianello, Sauro Bufalini, Gianfranco Lombardi, Giusto Pellanera, Massimo Cosmelli, Franco Bertini, Guido Carlo Gatti, Sandro Spinetti (Coach: Carmine "Nello" Paratore)
