= EuroBasket 1985 squads =

The following is the list of squads for each of the 12 teams competing in the EuroBasket 1985, held in West Germany between 5 and 16 June 1985. Each team selected a squad of 12 players for the tournament.

== Group A ==
=== France ===
France men's national basketball team roster
Players
Coaches

Pos.	No.	Name	Age – Date of birth	Height	Club
G	4	Frédéric Hufnagel	24 – 24 August 1960	1.86 m (6 ft 1 in)	Pau-Orthez	(France)
PG	5	Franck Cazalon	27 – 2 September 1957	1.87 m (6 ft 2 in)	US Avignon	(France)
SF	6	Patrick Cham	26 – 18 May 1959	1.96 m (6 ft 5 in)	Stade Français	(France)
F	7	Jacques Monclar	28 – 2 April 1957	1.93 m (6 ft 4 in)	Le Mans	(France)
PF	8	Philippe Szanyiel	24 – 23 December 1960	2.04 m (6 ft 8 in)	ASVEL Basket	(France)
PF	9	Stéphane Ostrowski	23 – 17 March 1962	2.05 m (6 ft 9 in)	Le Mans	(France)
G	10	Christophe Grégoire	28 – 3 February 1957	1.97 m (6 ft 6 in)	JA Vichy	(France)
G	11	Hervé Dubuisson	27 – 8 August 1957	1.97 m (6 ft 6 in)	Stade Français	(France)
C	12	Daniel Haquet	28 – 9 January 1957	2.02 m (6 ft 8 in)	Olympique Antibes	(France)
F	13	Christian Garnier	21 – 4 March 1964	1.98 m (6 ft 6 in)	Stade Français	(France)
F/C	14	Jean-Louis Hersin	22 – 10 October 1962	2.04 m (6 ft 8 in)	AS Monaco	(France)
PG	15	Valéry Demory	21 – 13 September 1963	1.78 m (5 ft 10 in)	Stade Français	(France)

Head coach

- Jean Luent

Legend

- Club – describes last
  club before the tournament
- Age – describes age
  on 5 June 1985

=== Poland ===
Poland men's national basketball team roster
Players
Coaches

Pos.	No.	Name	Age – Date of birth	Height	Club
PG	4	Dariusz Zelig	27 – 22 November 1957	1.92 m (6 ft 4 in)	Śląsk Wrocław	(Poland)
G	5	Dariusz Szczubiał	27 – 5 September 1957	1.90 m (6 ft 3 in)	Zagłębie Sosnowiec	(Poland)
F	6	Andrzej Żurawski	–
G	7	Marek Sobczyński	21 – 29 October 1963
C	8	Jarosław Jęchorek	24 – 31 May 1961
PF	9	Jerzy Binkowski	25 – 12 June 1959	2.06 m (6 ft 9 in)	Gwardia Wrocław	(Poland)
F	10	Ireneusz Mulak	29 – 30 March 1956	1.95 m (6 ft 5 in)
C	11	Justyn Węglorz	27 – 27 May 1958	2.03 m (6 ft 8 in)
F	12	Adam Fiedler	19 – 19 December 1965	1.97 m (6 ft 6 in)	Bobry Bytom	(Poland)
C	13	Henryk Wardach	21 – 22 February 1964
C	14	Jarosław Zyskowski	–
C	15	Krzysztof Fikiel	27 – 3 February 1958	2.06 m (6 ft 9 in)	Wisła Kraków	(Poland)

Head coach

- Andrzej Kuchar

Legend

- Club – describes last
  club before the tournament
- Age – describes age
  on 5 June 1985

=== Romania ===
Romania men's national basketball team roster
Players
Coaches

Pos.	No.	Name	Age – Date of birth	Height	Club
F	4	Florentin Ermurache	25 – 30 April 1960
F	5	Attila Szabó	–
F	6	Viorel Constantin	–
C	7	Ioan Ionescu	–
C	8	Doru Rădulescu	23 – 9 June 1961
PG	9	Dan Niculescu	32 – 14 March 1953
G	10	Costel Cernat	32 – 2 April 1953
C	11	Roman Opsitaru	28 – 11 July 1956
PG	12	Anton Netolitzchi	27 – 6 March 1958
F	13	Victor Jacob	–
PG	14	Marian Marinache	–
C	15	Alexandru Vinereanu	25 – 19 September 1959

Head coach

- Gheorghe Novac

Legend

- Club – describes last
  club before the tournament
- Age – describes age
  on 5 June 1985

=== Spain ===
Spain men's national basketball team roster
Players
Coaches

Pos.	No.	Name	Age – Date of birth	Height	Club
F	4	Jordi Villacampa	21 – 11 October 1963	1.96 m (6 ft 5 in)	Joventut Badalona	(Spain)
PG	5	José Luis Llorente	26 – 6 January 1959	1.82 m (6 ft 0 in)	Cajamadrid	(Spain)
F	6	Cándido Sibilio	26 – 3 October 1958	2.00 m (6 ft 7 in)	FC Barcelona	(Spain)
F	7	Josep María Margall	30 – 17 March 1955	1.98 m (6 ft 6 in)	Joventut Badalona	(Spain)
PF	8	Andrés Jiménez	22 – 6 June 1962	2.05 m (6 ft 9 in)	Joventut Badalona	(Spain)
C	9	Fernando Romay	25 – 23 September 1959	2.13 m (7 ft 0 in)	Real Madrid	(Spain)
C	10	Fernando Martín	23 – 25 March 1962	2.05 m (6 ft 9 in)	Real Madrid	(Spain)
PG	11	Vicente Gil	31 – 16 May 1954	1.76 m (5 ft 9 in)	CB Estudiantes	(Spain)
PG	12	Joaquim Costa	27 – 30 October 1957	1.84 m (6 ft 0 in)	CB Santa Coloma	(Spain)
C	13	Juan Domingo de la Cruz	31 – 6 February 1954	2.06 m (6 ft 9 in)	FC Barcelona	(Spain)
F	14	Juan Manuel López Iturriaga	26 – 4 February 1959	1.94 m (6 ft 4 in)	Real Madrid	(Spain)
F	15	Juan Antonio San Epifanio	25 – 12 June 1959	1.98 m (6 ft 6 in)	FC Barcelona	(Spain)

Head coach

- Antonio Díaz-Miguel

Legend

- Club – describes last
  club before the tournament
- Age – describes age
  on 5 June 1985

=== Soviet Union ===
Soviet Union men's national basketball team roster
Players
Coaches

Pos.	No.	Name	Age – Date of birth	Height	Club
PF	4	Alexander Volkov	21 – 28 March 1964	2.08 m (6 ft 10 in)	BC Budivelnyk	(Soviet Union)
G	5	Heino Enden	25 – 13 December 1959	1.96 m (6 ft 5 in)	PBC CSKA Moscow	(Soviet Union)
F	6	Sergei Tarakanov	27 – 25 April 1958	2.03 m (6 ft 8 in)	PBC CSKA Moscow	(Soviet Union)
PG	7	Valdemaras Chomičius	26 – 4 May 1959	1.92 m (6 ft 4 in)	BC Žalgiris	(Soviet Union)
PF	8	Andrey Lopatov	28 – 12 March 1957	2.05 m (6 ft 9 in)	PBC CSKA Moscow	(Soviet Union)
F	9	Valeri Tikhonenko	20 – 19 August 1964	2.07 m (6 ft 9 in)	SKA Alma Ata	(Soviet Union)
PG	10	Valdis Valters	27 – 4 August 1957	1.95 m (6 ft 5 in)	BK VEF Rīga	(Soviet Union)
C	11	Vladimir Tkachenko	27 – 20 September 1957	2.20 m (7 ft 3 in)	PBC CSKA Moscow	(Soviet Union)
F	12	Rimas Kurtinaitis	25 – 15 May 1960	1.96 m (6 ft 5 in)	BC Žalgiris	(Soviet Union)
F	13	Sergejus Jovaiša	30 – 17 December 1954	1.95 m (6 ft 5 in)	BC Žalgiris	(Soviet Union)
C	14	Alexander Belostenny	26 – 24 February 1959	2.14 m (7 ft 0 in)	PBC CSKA Moscow	(Soviet Union)
C	15	Arvydas Sabonis	20 – 19 December 1964	2.21 m (7 ft 3 in)	BC Žalgiris	(Soviet Union)

Head coach

- Vladimir Obuchov

Legend

- Club – describes last
  club before the tournament
- Age – describes age
  on 5 June 1985

=== Yugoslavia ===
Yugoslavia men's national basketball team roster
Players
Coaches

Pos.	No.	Name	Age – Date of birth	Height	Club
G	4	Dražen Petrović	20 – 22 October 1964	1.96 m (6 ft 5 in)	KK Cibona	(Socialist Federal Republic of Yugoslavia)
PG	5	Nebojša Zorkić	23 – 21 August 1961	1.88 m (6 ft 2 in)	KK Partizan	(Socialist Federal Republic of Yugoslavia)
F	6	Zoran Čutura	23 – 12 March 1962	2.02 m (6 ft 8 in)	KK Cibona	(Socialist Federal Republic of Yugoslavia)
C	7	Stojko Vranković	21 – 22 January 1964	2.18 m (7 ft 2 in)	KK Zadar	(Socialist Federal Republic of Yugoslavia)
F	8	Ivan Sunara	26 – 27 March 1959	2.03 m (6 ft 8 in)	KK Zadar	(Socialist Federal Republic of Yugoslavia)
F	9	Emir Mutapčić	25 – 27 May 1960	1.97 m (6 ft 6 in)	KK Bosna Royal	(Socialist Federal Republic of Yugoslavia)
PG	10	Zoran Radović	24 – 17 February 1961	1.91 m (6 ft 3 in)	KK Crvena zvezda	(Socialist Federal Republic of Yugoslavia)
C	11	Andro Knego	28 – 21 October 1956	2.06 m (6 ft 9 in)	KK Cibona	(Socialist Federal Republic of Yugoslavia)
F	12	Sven Ušić	25 – 19 August 1959	2.01 m (6 ft 7 in)	KK Cibona	(Socialist Federal Republic of Yugoslavia)
PF	13	Mihovil Nakić	29 – 31 July 1955	2.04 m (6 ft 8 in)	KK Cibona	(Socialist Federal Republic of Yugoslavia)
F	14	Borislav Vučević	26 – 29 August 1958	2.01 m (6 ft 7 in)	KK Bosna	(Socialist Federal Republic of Yugoslavia)
PF	15	Boban Petrović	27 – 19 July 1957	2.04 m (6 ft 8 in)	KK Partizan	(Socialist Federal Republic of Yugoslavia)

Head coach

- Krešimir Ćosić

Assistant coach(es)

- Vlade Đurović

Legend

- Club – describes last
  club before the tournament
- Age – describes age
  on 5 June 1985

== Group B ==
=== Bulgaria ===
Bulgaria men's national basketball team roster
Players
Coaches

Pos.	No.	Name	Age – Date of birth	Height	Club
C	4	Kojo Koev	24 – 24 June 1960
	5	Atanas Kolev	–
PG	6	Jordan Kolev	21 – 22 May 1964
	7	Rosen Barchovski	24 – 16 August 1960
C	8	Ilija Evtimov	29 – 10 February 1956
F	9	Saško Vezenkov	22 – 1 April 1963
G	10	Ivan Cenov	23 – 8 February 1962
G	11	Georgi Mladenov	23 – 11 May 1962	1.92 m (6 ft 4 in)	BC Levski Sofia	(Bulgaria)
F	12	Cvetan Antov	23 – 11 May 1962
F	13	Emil Jonov	–
PF	14	Georgi Glouchkov	25 – 10 January 1960	2.10 m (6 ft 11 in)	BC Cherno More Port Varna	(Bulgaria)
C	15	Ljubomir Amiorkov	22 – 21 June 1962

Head coach

- Cvjatko Barchovski

Legend

- Club – describes last
  club before the tournament
- Age – describes age
  on 5 June 1985

=== Czechoslovakia ===
Czechoslovakia men's national basketball team roster
Players
Coaches

Pos.	No.	Name	Age – Date of birth	Height	Club
C	4	Jaroslav Skála	31 – 27 May 1954	2.14 m (7 ft 0 in)	BK Iskra Svit	(Czechoslovakia)
G	5	Juraj Žuffa	25 – 2 September 1959		BK Inter Bratislava	(Czechoslovakia)
G	6	Vlastimil Havlík	28 – 25 January 1957	1.91 m (6 ft 3 in)	BC Brno	(Czechoslovakia)
F	7	Peter Rajniak	32 – 25 May 1953	2.00 m (6 ft 7 in)	BK Inter Bratislava	(Czechoslovakia)
C	8	Stano Kropilák	29 – 10 June 1955	2.08 m (6 ft 10 in)	BK Inter Bratislava	(Czechoslovakia)
PG	9	Zdeněk Böhm	28 – 3 March 1957
C	10	Jiří Okáč	21 – 3 November 1963	2.17 m (7 ft 1 in)	Dukla Olomouc	(Czechoslovakia)
PG	11	Igor Vraniak	–
F	12	Vladimír Vyoral	23 – 5 December 1961	1.92 m (6 ft 4 in)
F	13	Kamil Brabenec	34 – 4 February 1951	1.93 m (6 ft 4 in)	BC Brno	(Czechoslovakia)
C	14	Otto Matický	21 – 30 June 1963
PF	15	Leoš Krejčí	20 – 17 January 1965

Head coach

- Pavel Petera

Legend

- Club – describes last
  club before the tournament
- Age – describes age
  on 5 June 1985

=== Israel ===
Israel men's national basketball team roster
Players
Coaches

Pos.	No.	Name	Age – Date of birth	Height	Club
	4	Amir Bino	23 – 8 August 1961
F	5	Mordechai Daniel	21 – 24 July 1963
C	6	Ofer Yaakobi	–
PG	7	Motti Aroesti	–
C	8	Steve Schlachter	–
F	9	Miki Berkovich	31 – 17 February 1954	1.92 m (6 ft 4 in)	Maccabi Tel Aviv B.C.	(Israel)
C	10	Chaim Zlotikman	28 – 17 March 1957
PG	11	Shmuel Zisman	–
F	12	Doron Jamchi	23 – 1 July 1961	1.98 m (6 ft 6 in)	Ironi Ramat Gan	(Israel)
PG	13	Hen Lippin	19 – 4 November 1965	1.84 m (6 ft 0 in)	Maccabi Tel Aviv B.C.	(Israel)
F	14	Pinhas Hozez	27 – 8 September 1957
C	15	Johan Willis	32 – 23 September 1952

Head coach

- Zvi Sherf

Legend

- Club – describes last
  club before the tournament
- Age – describes age
  on 5 June 1985

=== Italy ===
Italy men's national basketball team roster
Players
Coaches

Pos.	No.	Name	Age – Date of birth	Height	Club
G	4	Giampiero Savio	25 – 6 November 1959	1.95 m (6 ft 5 in)	Fabriano Basket	(Italy)
F	5	Beppe Bosa	20 – 9 October 1964	2.04 m (6 ft 8 in)	Pallacanestro Cantù	(Italy)
C	6	Ario Costa	23 – 26 September 1961	2.11 m (6 ft 11 in)	Victoria Libertas Pesaro	(Italy)
G	7	Enrico Gilardi	28 – 20 January 1957	1.93 m (6 ft 4 in)	Virtus Roma	(Italy)
C	8	Walter Magnifico	23 – 18 June 1961	2.09 m (6 ft 10 in)	Victoria Libertas Pesaro	(Italy)
PG	9	Roberto Brunamonti	26 – 14 April 1959	1.91 m (6 ft 3 in)	Virtus Bologna	(Italy)
PF	10	Renato Villalta	30 – 3 February 1955	2.04 m (6 ft 8 in)	Virtus Bologna	(Italy)
C	11	Augusto Binelli	20 – 23 September 1964	2.15 m (7 ft 1 in)	Virtus Bologna	(Italy)
F	12	Roberto Premier	27 – 25 January 1958	1.97 m (6 ft 6 in)	Olimpia Milano	(Italy)
C	13	Renzo Vecchiato	29 – 8 August 1955	2.07 m (6 ft 9 in)	Auxilium Torino	(Italy)
PG	14	Pierluigi Marzorati	32 – 12 September 1952	1.87 m (6 ft 2 in)	Pallacanestro Cantù	(Italy)
F	15	Romeo Sacchetti	31 – 20 August 1953	1.99 m (6 ft 6 in)	Pallacanestro Varese	(Italy)

Head coach

- Sandro Gamba

Legend

- Club – describes last
  club before the tournament
- Age – describes age
  on 5 June 1985

=== Netherlands ===
Netherlands men's national basketball team roster
Players
Coaches

Pos.	No.	Name	Age – Date of birth	Height	Club
F	4	Martin Esajas	22 – 15 November 1962
F	5	Ronald Schilp	25 – 17 October 1959
G	6	[[Martin de Vries |Martin de Vries]]	–		Donar	(Netherlands)
PG	7	Marco de Waard	23 – 23 November 1961
F	8	Jelle Esveldt	25 – 16 May 1960
F	9	Ron van der Schaaf	–
PG	10	John Franken	–
C	11	Cock van de Lagemaat	–
F	12	Jos Kuipers	23 – 10 December 1961
C	13	Peter van Noord	–
F	14	Hans Heijdeman	–
C	15	Rob van Essen	–

Head coach

- Vladimír Heger

Legend

- Club – describes last
  club before the tournament
- Age – describes age
  on 5 June 1985

=== West Germany ===
West Germany men's national basketball team roster
Players
Coaches

Pos.	No.	Name	Age – Date of birth	Height	Club
G	4	Ulrich Peters	27 – 2 July 1957	1.94 m (6 ft 4 in)	ASC 1846 Göttingen	(West Germany)
G	5	Stephan Baeck	20 – 12 April 1965	1.95 m (6 ft 5 in)	BSC Saturn Köln	(West Germany)
PG	6	Christoph Körner	22 – 1 December 1962	1.89 m (6 ft 2 in)	Bayer Giants Leverkusen	(West Germany)
PG	7	Uwe Sauer	22 – 23 February 1963	1.87 m (6 ft 2 in)	BSC Saturn Köln	(West Germany)
F	8	Mike Jackel	–	1.99 m (6 ft 6 in)	ASC 1846 Göttingen	(West Germany)
C	9	Chris Welp	21 – 2 January 1964	2.13 m (7 ft 0 in)	University of Washington	(United States)
C	10	Uwe Blab	23 – 26 March 1962	2.16 m (7 ft 1 in)	Dallas Mavericks	(United States)
C	11	Armin Sowa	25 – 2 August 1959	2.04 m (6 ft 8 in)	ASC 1846 Göttingen	(West Germany)
F	12	Detlef Schrempf	22 – 21 January 1963	2.06 m (6 ft 9 in)	Dallas Mavericks	(United States)
F	13	Lutz Wadehn	24 – 28 February 1961	2.01 m (6 ft 7 in)	University of Puget Sound	(United States)
C	14	Burkhard Schröder	–
C	15	Gunther Behnke	22 – 19 January 1963	2.21 m (7 ft 3 in)	Bayer Giants Leverkusen	(West Germany)

Head coach

- Ralph Klein

Legend

- Club – describes last
  club before the tournament
- Age – describes age
  on 5 June 1985
