= East Germany men's national basketball team =

East Germany
- FIBA ranking: Defunct
- Joined FIBA: 1952
- FIBA zone: FIBA Europe
- National federation: Deutscher Basketball Verband der DDR

Olympic Games
- Appearances: None

FIBA World Cup
- Appearances: None

EuroBasket
- Appearances: 5
- Medals: None
Home	Away

First international
- East Germany 37–87 Soviet Union (Istanbul, Turkey; 22 May 1959)

Biggest win
- East Germany 87–42 Sweden (Halle, East Germany; 5 May 1967)

Biggest defeat
- East Germany 37–87 Soviet Union (Istanbul, Turkey; 22 May 1959)

The East Germany men's national basketball team was recognised by FIBA as the German Democratic Republic basketball team from 1952 to 1990.

East Germany's biggest success during international events came at the EuroBasket 1963 in Wrocław. It was where they earned their highest ranked finish of sixth place.

== History ==
After the Second World War, two German national basketball teams were in existence. The East Germany national team joined FIBA as members in 1952. They wouldn't enter their first international tournament until the EuroBasket 1959, where they finished 14th.

At the EuroBasket 1961 in Belgrade, East Germany finished 12th out of the 19 teams, four spots ahead of West Germany. Overall, the national basketball team of East Germany had its biggest success at the EuroBasket 1963 in Wrocław. After four victories and three losses in the preliminary round, East Germany went as the third seed (behind the tournament winner Soviet Union and silver medalist Poland) in Group B. Since only the first two places advanced to the semi-finals, East Germany played against Belgium and Bulgaria in the classification round. After beating Belgium 81–35, East Germany lost to Bulgaria 62–77. According to many experts, East Germany was one of the biggest surprises of the tournament.

At the EuroBasket 1965 in Moscow/Tbilisi, the East German team could not repeat its impressive performance two years earlier. However, it outperformed its West German competitors by four spots and finished 10th out of the 16 teams. East Germany competed in its last EuroBasket in 1967, hosted in Helsinki/Tampere. They eventually finished out the event in 14th place.

After failing at EuroBasket a year prior, East Germany entered qualification for the 1968 Summer Olympics. It was then they defeated West Germany for the second time, though they missed out on qualifying. Despite the lack of popularity of basketball in East Germany, it took the West German national team until 1973 to earn its first victory over the East Germans, who displayed disciplined playing styles. However, even after East Germany exhibited some solid performances at European basketball competitions, the national team never qualified for the World Cup or Summer Olympics.

== Demise ==
In 1969, the Socialist Unity Party of Germany decided to shift its focus towards sports that were most likely to win medals, and earn points at international competitions. Since basketball is a team sport, where in contrast to individual sports, the whole team can only win a single Olympic medal; it lost considerable government support. Eventually, the SED and Stasi leader Erich Mielke banned East German basketball players from traveling to non-socialist countries, and immensely limited the sponsorship and promotion of talents. This ultimately led to the end of East Germany's international basketball existence, which ceased completely after 1973, although the federation would continue to be recognised by FIBA as a full member, until reunification in 1990.

== Competitive record ==
=== EuroBasket ===
EuroBasket					Qualification		
Year	Position	Pld	W	L	Pld	W	L
(Soviet Union) 1953	Did not enter						
(Hungary) 1955	Did not enter						
(Bulgaria) 1957	Did not enter						
(Turkey) 1959	14th	6	1	5			
(Socialist Federal Republic of Yugoslavia) 1961	12th	8	2	6			
(Poland) 1963	6th	9	5	4	Directly qualified		
(Soviet Union) 1965	10th	9	3	6	Directly qualified		
(Finland) 1967	14th	9	2	7	3	3	0
(Italy) 1969	Did not enter				Did not enter		
(West Germany) 1971	Did not enter				Did not enter		
(Spain) 1973	Did not qualify				9	5	4
(Socialist Federal Republic of Yugoslavia) 1975	Did not enter				Did not enter		
(Belgium) 1977	Did not enter				Did not enter		
(Italy) 1979	Did not enter				Did not enter		
(Czechoslovakia) 1981	Did not enter				Did not enter		
(France) 1983	Did not enter				Did not enter		
(West Germany) 1985	Did not enter				Did not enter		
(Greece) 1987	Did not enter				Did not enter		
(Socialist Federal Republic of Yugoslavia) 1989	Did not enter				Did not enter		
Total	5/19	41	13	28	12	8	4

== See also ==
- East Germany women's national basketball team
