= Muli Katzurin =

Israeli basketball coach (born 1954)

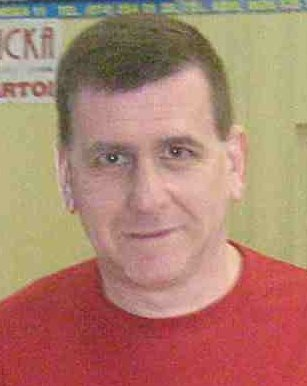

Personal information
- Born: October 30, 1954 (age 72)
- Listed height: 1.92 m (6 ft 4 in)
- Position: Head coach
- Coaching career: 1978–present

Career history

Coaching
- 1978–1979: Hapoel Tel Aviv (Assistant)
- 1979–1980: Maccabi Ramat Gan (Assistant)
- 1980–1981: Beitar Tel Aviv (Assistant)
- 1983–1984: Maccabi Darom Tel Aviv
- 1984–1985: Ironi Ramat Gan
- 1985–1987: Hapoel Holon
- 1987–1992: Hapoel Galil Elyon
- 1992–1993: Bnei Herzliya
- 1993–1995: Maccabi Tel Aviv
- 1995–1997: Bnei Herzliya
- 1998–1999: Ironi Ramat Gan
- 1997–2004: Israel
- 1999–2000: Śląsk Wrocław
- 2003–2004: Śląsk Wrocław
- 2006–2010: Nymburk
- 2008–2010: Poland
- 2011: Alba Berlin
- 2011–2013: Skyliners Frankfurt
- 2014: Bnei Herzliya
- 2015: Eisbären Bremerhaven

Muli Katzurin (Hebrew: מולי קצורין; born November 30, 1954) is an Israeli basketball coach.

== Biography ==
For twenty years (1970s-1990s), Katzurin coached Israeli teams such as Hapoel Tel Aviv and Maccabi Tel Aviv. Katzurin also coached Israel National Team in the years 1997–2004. In 1999, he accepted offer from Śląsk Wrocław and came to Poland. Between 2006 and 2008, he coached a Czech team CEZ Basketball Nymburk, then in early 2008 was named coach of the national team of Poland, replacing a Slovenian, Andrej Urlep.In January 2011 he was named as the head coach of the German team ALBA Berlin. In 2012 he was named as head coach of the German team Frankfurt Skyliners for 2 years. In 2014 he was named as head coach of the Israeli team Bnei-Herzelia. in 2015 he was named as head coach of the German team Eisbären Bremerhaven.
