= Cegielski (surname) =

Cegielski (feminine: Cegielska) is a Polish surname. Notable people with the surname include:

- Franciszka Cegielska (1946–2000), Polish politician, government official and engineer
- Henryk Cegielski (1945–2015), Polish basketball player
- Hipolit Cegielski (1813–1868), Polish businessman and social and cultural activist
- Kazimierz Cegielski (died 1946), Nazi official tried during the Belsen trials
- Krzysztof Cegielski (born 1979), Polish speedway rider
- Wayne Cegielski (born 1956), Welsh footballer

== See also ==
- H. Cegielski – Poznań
- Lonhyn Tsehelsky (1875–1950), Ukrainian lawyer, journalist and political leader
