= Pstrokoński =

Pstrokoński (feminine: Pstrokońska; plural: Pstrokońscy) is a Polish surname. Notable people with this surname include:

- Andrzej Pstrokoński (1936–2022), Polish basketball player
- Bohdan Poraj-Pstrokonski (born 1973), British actor
- Grażyna Pstrokońska-Nawratil (born 1947), Polish musician
