= Janusz Wichowski =

Polish basketball player and coach

Personal information
- Born: 6 October 1935 Chełm, Poland
- Died: 31 January 2013 (aged 77) Valenciennes, France
- Listed height: 6 ft 5 in (1.96 m)
- Listed weight: 195 lb (88 kg)

Career information
- Playing career: 1954–1971
- Position: Small forward
- Coaching career: 1971–1981

Career history

Playing
- 1954–1955: Ślęza Wrocław
- 1955–1960: Polonia Warszawa
- 1960–1968: Legia Warszawa
- 1968–1969: Bruges
- 1969–1971: Skra Warszawa

Coaching
- 1971–1981: Marly Escaudain

Career highlights
- FIBA European Selection (1964); 4× Polish League champion (1959, 1961, 1963, 1966); Polish Cup winner (1968); 6× Polish League Top Scorer (1956–1960, 1964)
Medals
Representing Poland
Men's basketball
EuroBasket
Silver medal – second place	1963 Poland
Bronze medal – third place	1965 Soviet Union

Janusz Wiktor Wichowski (6 October 1935 in Chełm – 31 January 2013 in Valenciennes) was a Polish professional basketball player and coach. At a height of 1.96 m (6 ft 5 in) tall, and a weight of 88 kg (194 lb), he played at the small forward position.

== Professional career ==
Wichowski was a member of the FIBA European Selection, in 1964.

== National team career ==
As a member of the senior Polish national basketball team, Wichowski competed at the 1960 Summer Olympics, and at the 1964 Summer Olympics. He also won the silver medal at the EuroBasket 1963, and the bronze medal at the EuroBasket 1965.

== Awards and accomplishments ==
- 6× Polish League Top Scorer: (1956, 1957, 1958, 1959, 1960, 1964)
- 4× Polish League Champion: (1959, 1961, 1963, 1966)
- FIBA European Selection: (1964)
- Polish Cup Winner: (1968)
