= Walenty Kłyszejko =

Estonian-Polish basketball player and coach

Personal information
- Born: 2 December 1909 Saint Petersburg, Russian Empire
- Died: 20 August 1987 (aged 77) Warsaw, Poland

Walenty Kłyszejko (Estonian: Valentin Klõšeiko, Russian: Валентин Клышейко; 2 December 1909 – 20 August 1987) was an Estonian–Polish basketball coach and player. He was also a professor of physical education at the Józef Piłsudski University of Physical Education in Warsaw.

Klyszejko was born in Saint Petersburg. Some time in the 1910s, he moved with family to Tallinn, where began playing basketball at the local YMCA team as well as for the national basketball team of Estonia, for which he capped five times. In the 1933, he came to Poland to study at The Academy of Physical Education in Warsaw and became a coach of Polonia Warszawa. In 1936 he became coach of the national basketball team of Poland, which at the 1936 Summer Olympics was placed on the fourth spot, the best in the history of Polish basketball. In 1939, during the European Championships, Poland under Klyszejko won bronze.

Klyszejko fought in the Polish September Campaign, after which he managed to get to Great Britain, where he remained a soldier of the Polish Army. After the war, he returned to Poland, coaching the team of AZS-AWF Warszawa, writing books about sports and lecturing.
