= Ottorino Flaborea =

Italian basketball player and coach

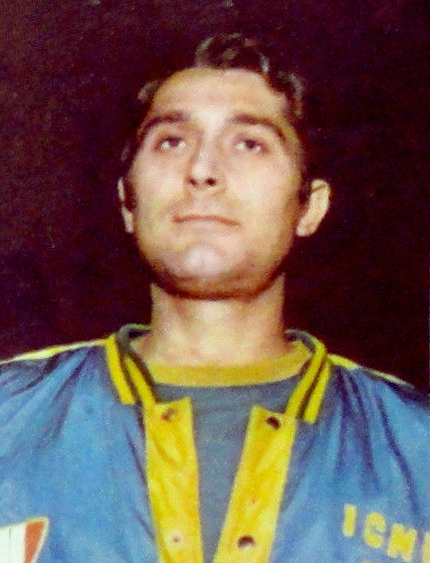
- Flaborea, in 1970.

Personal information
- Born: 5 March 1940 (age 86) Concordia Sagittaria, Italy
- Listed height: 6 ft 6.75 in (2.00 m)
- Listed weight: 232 lb (105 kg)

Career information
- Playing career: 1959–1980
- Position: Center
- Coaching career: 1974–1980

Career history

Playing
- 1959–1964: Biella
- 1964–1972: Varese
- 1972–1974: Biella
- 1980: Vigliano Basket Team

Coaching
- Biella
- 1974–1975: Basket Brescia
- Biella
- 1980: Vigliano Basket Team

Career highlights
- As player: 3× FIBA Intercontinental Cup champion (1966, 1970, 1973); 3× EuroLeague champion (1970, 1972, 1973); FIBA European Selection (1972); FIBA Saporta Cup champion (1967); 4× Italian League champion (1969–1972); 4× Italian Cup winner (1969–1971, 1973); Italian Basketball Hall of Fame (2008)
Medals
Representing Italy
Men's basketball
FIBA EuroBasket
Bronze medal – third place	1971 Germany

Ottorino Flaborea (born 5 March 1940) is a retired Italian professional basketball player and coach. His nickname as a player, was "Captain Hook", due to his great hook shot. He was inducted into the Italian Basketball Hall of Fame, in 2008.

== Club career ==
Flaborea was a FIBA European Selection, in 1972.

== National team career ==
Flaborea was a part of the senior Italian national basketball teams that won the bronze medal at the 1971 EuroBasket, and finished in fourth place at the 1965 EuroBasket. He also competed at the 1964, 1968, and 1972 Summer Olympic Games, finishing in fifth, eighth, and fourth place, respectively.
