= Igor Miličić Jr. =

Croatian-Polish basketball player (born 2002)

No. 7 – Westchester Knicks
- Position: Small forward
- League: NBA G League

Personal information
- Born: August 27, 2002 (age 24) Pula, Croatia
- Listed height: 6 ft 10 in (2.08 m)
- Listed weight: 225 lb (102 kg)

Career information
- College: Virginia (2021–2022); Charlotte (2022–2024); Tennessee (2024–2025)
- NBA draft: 2025: undrafted
- Playing career: 2019–present

Career history
- -2019: Trefl Sopot
- 2019–2021: OrangeAcademy
- 2020–2021: Ratiopharm Ulm
- 2025–2026: Delaware Blue Coats
- 2026–present: Westchester Knicks
- Stats at NBA.com
- Stats at Basketball Reference
Medals
Men's basketball
Representing Poland

Igor Miličić Jr. (born August 27, 2002) is a Croatian-Polish professional basketball player for the Westchester Knicks of the NBA G League. He played college basketball for the Tennessee Volunteers, Charlotte 49ers, and Virginia Cavaliers.

== Early life and high school ==
Miličić Jr. played for Ratiopharm Ulm in the German top-tier Basketball Bundesliga, as well as the German third division, and averaged 13.3 points, 4.9 rebounds and 1.5 assists while making 36 3-pointers in 21 games. Ultimately, he decided to pursue the college basketball route, committing to play for the Virginia Cavaliers.

== College career ==
=== Virginia ===
Miličić Jr. appeared in 16 games and averaged 2.1 points per game in the 2021-22 season, after which he entered his name into the NCAA transfer portal.

=== Charlotte ===
Miličić Jr. transferred to play for the Charlotte 49ers. In 2022-23, he averaged 7.7 points and 4.1 rebounds per game in 35 games with 22 starts. On March 6, 2024, Miličić Jr. dropped 26 points in a win over Rice. In 2023-24, he averaged 12.8 points and 8.5 rebounds on 37.6 percent shooting from three, earning third-team all-AAC honors. After the season, Miličić Jr. once again entered his name into the NCAA transfer portal.

=== Tennessee ===
Miličić Jr. transferred to play for the Tennessee Volunteers. On November 13, 2024, he notched 18 points, ten rebounds, and five assists in a win over Montana. On January 4, 2025, Miličić Jr. tallied 13 points and 18 rebounds in a win over Arkansas. On February 5, he notched a team-high 21 points, ten rebounds, five assists, four blocks, and two steals in a win over Missouri. On February 11, Miličić Jr. put up 16 points versus Kentucky.

== Professional career ==
On July 8, 2025, Miličić Jr. signed for the Philadelphia 76ers after going undrafted in the 2025 NBA Draft. He joined their G League affiliate, the Delaware Blue Coats, averaging 6.9 points, 4.8 rebounds, and 1.0 assists per game.

On September 12, 2026, Miličić signed an Exhibit 10 contract with the New York Knicks. On September 14, Miličić was traded to the Westchester Knicks. He was waived from his Exhibit 10 contract on September 15.

== National team career ==
In February 2021, Miličić Jr. debuted with the Poland senior national team during EuroBasket 2022 qualification.

== Personal life ==
Miličić Jr. is the son of former professional basketball player and coach Igor Miličić. He is a dual citizen of Croatia and Poland.
