= Priit Tomson =

Estonian basketball player

Medal record

Men's basketball

Representing Soviet Union

Olympic Games
Bronze medal – third place	1968 Mexico	Team

FIBA World Cup
Gold medal – first place	Uruguay 1967	Team
Gold medal – first place	Puerto Rico 1974	Team
Bronze medal – third place	Yugoslavia 1970	Team

FIBA Eurobasket
Gold medal – first place	Finland 1967	Team
Gold medal – first place	Italy 1969	Team
Gold medal – first place	West Germany 1971	Team

Summer Universiade
Gold medal – first place	1970 Turin	Team

Priit Tomson (November 3, 1942, Tallinn, 193 cm) is a retired Estonian professional basketball player, who competed for the Soviet Union. He is the only Estonian basketball player who has won two gold medals at the World Championship. Tomson is a three-time Eurobasket champion with the Soviet Union national basketball team. He was a member of the youth and student teams of the Soviet Union in 1963–65 and the senior team in 1966–74 as a small forward. The highest-scoring player in the Estonian National Team throughout his long career.He was described as a basketball aristocrat, who was characterised by skilful operating in picking up offensive rebounds and accurate throwing from central positions and was often tasked with neutralising the opponents’ most dangerous players. Elected to the Hall of fame of Estonian basketball in 2010.

== Club career ==
Tomson's career started at the age of 18 in 1961 when he joined TPI basketball team (Tallinn Polytechnic Institute). After that he played for Kalev Tartu at the Championships of the Soviet Union in 1963–76 and for the Estonian National Team, which he captained from 1969.

== Achievements ==
=== National team ===
- Olympic Games: 1968
- World Championships: 1967,

1970, 1974

- European Championships: 1967, 1969, 1971

=== Club ===
- Estonian SSR Championship: 1961-1966, 1979
