= Thomas Kelati =

American Polish basketball player

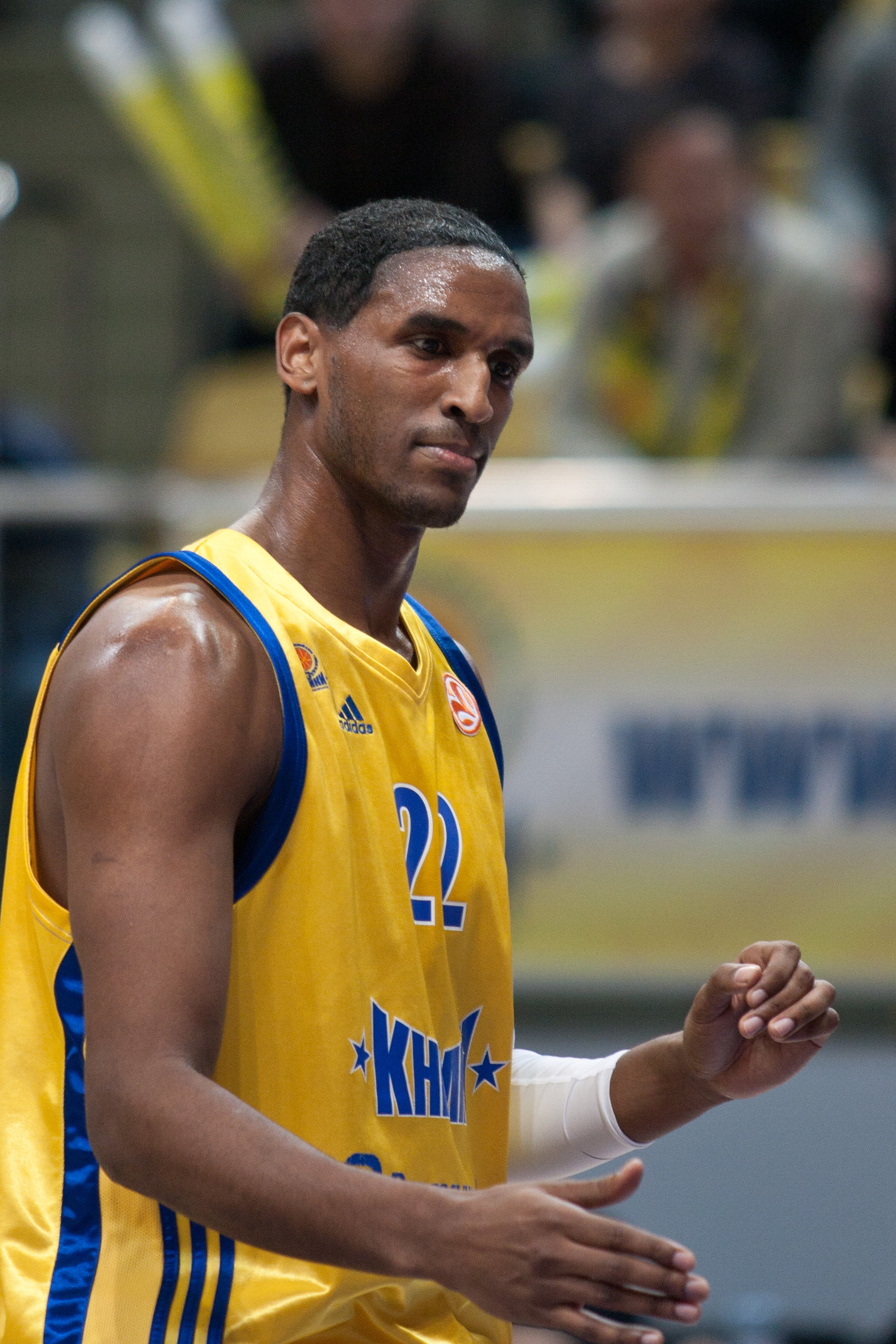

Personal information
- Born: September 27, 1982 (age 44) Walla Walla, Washington
- Listed height: 6 ft 5 in (1.96 m)
- Listed weight: 210 lb (95 kg)

Career information
- High school: Walla Walla (Walla Walla, Washington)
- College: Washington State (2001–2005)
- NBA draft: 2005: undrafted
- Playing career: 2005–2018
- Position: Shooting guard / small forward

Career history
- 2005–2006: Dexia Mons-Hainaut
- 2006–2008: Turów Zgorzelec
- 2008–2009: Unicaja Málaga
- 2009–2010: Valencia
- 2010–2012: Khimki
- 2012–2013: Valencia
- 2013: Laboral Kutxa
- 2014–2016: UCAM Murcia
- 2016–2018: Stelmet Zielona Góra

Career highlights
- Polish League champion (2017); Polish League MVP (2007); 2× EuroCup champion (2010, 2012); VTB United League champion (2011); First-team All-Pac-10 (2005); EuroLeague records since the 2000–01 season: Most 3-point field goals attempted in a game

Thomas Kelati (born September 27, 1982) is an American former professional basketball player of Eritrean heritage. In 2010, he gained Polish citizenship through his wife and is eligible to play on the Poland national basketball team in international competition. He is a 1.96 metres (6 ft 5 in) tall and played both shooting guard and small forward.

== Professional career ==
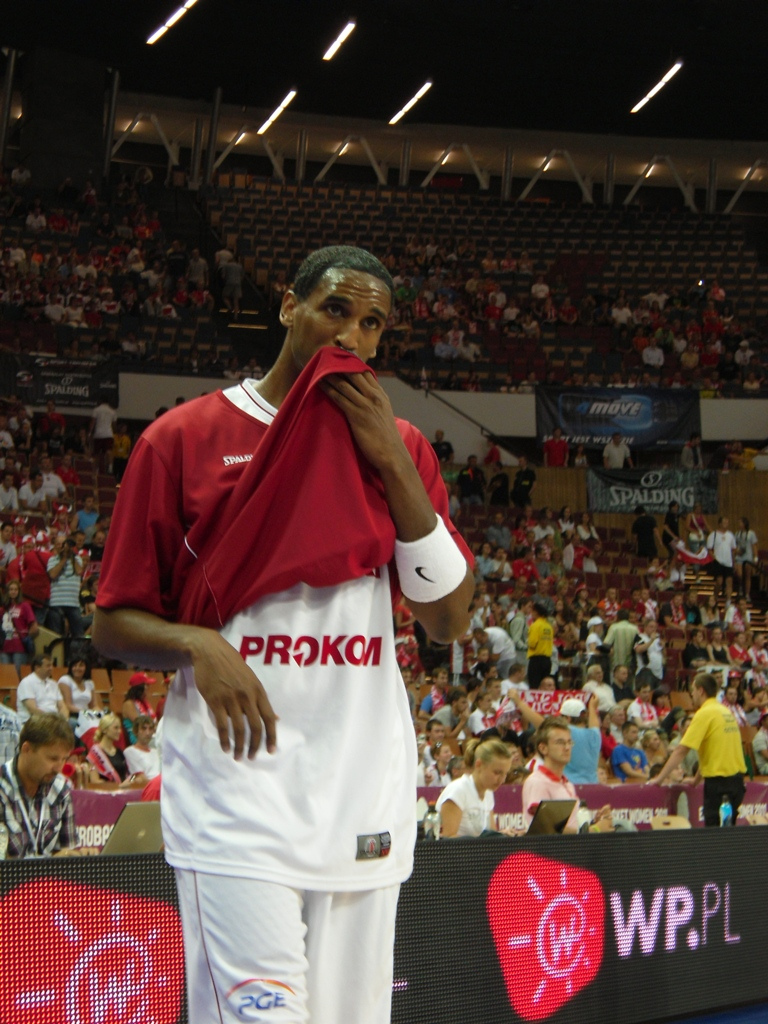
Thomas Kelati was a member of the Poland national basketball team during the EuroBasket 2011.

Kelati began his professional career in 2005 with the Belgian League club Dexia Mons-Hainaut. He then moved to the Polish League team Turów Zgorzelec in 2006 (two runners-up in Polish league, reached the final round in the ULEB Eurocup). In 2008, he joined the Spanish ACB League club Unicaja Málaga.

In July 2009, Kelati signed a two-year contract with the Greek A1 League club Olympiacos Piraeus. However, his contract was later canceled by the club before Kelati played even a single minute for them, due to him not passing his physical and medical exams. Olympiacos replaced him on their roster with Von Wafer.

As a free agent, Kelati then signed with the Los Angeles Lakers as a training camp invitee on September 30, 2009, but was later waived. Then he played for Power Electronics Valencia for whom he signed after being waived from the Los Angeles Lakers. In 2010, he won the ULEB Eurocup playing for the Power Electronics Valencia. On July 23, 2010, he signed a two-year deal with BC Khimki. With BC Khimki he won VTB United League in 2011 and Eurocup in 2012. In May, 2012 he left BC Khimki because of his contract ending.

In June 2012 he signed a two-year contract with Valencia Basket. He left Valencia in June 2013. On September 29, 2013, he signed a two-month contract with Laboral Kutxa. After the contract expired he left the team.

In February 2014, he signed with UCAM Murcia for the rest of the season. In July 2014, he extended his contract with Murcia for two more years.

On August 8, 2016, Kelati signed with Stelmet Zielona Góra.

== Honours ==
=== Individual ===
Turów Zgorzelec

- PLK Most Valuable Player (1): 2006–07
