= Krzysztof Szubarga =

Polish basketball player (born 1984)

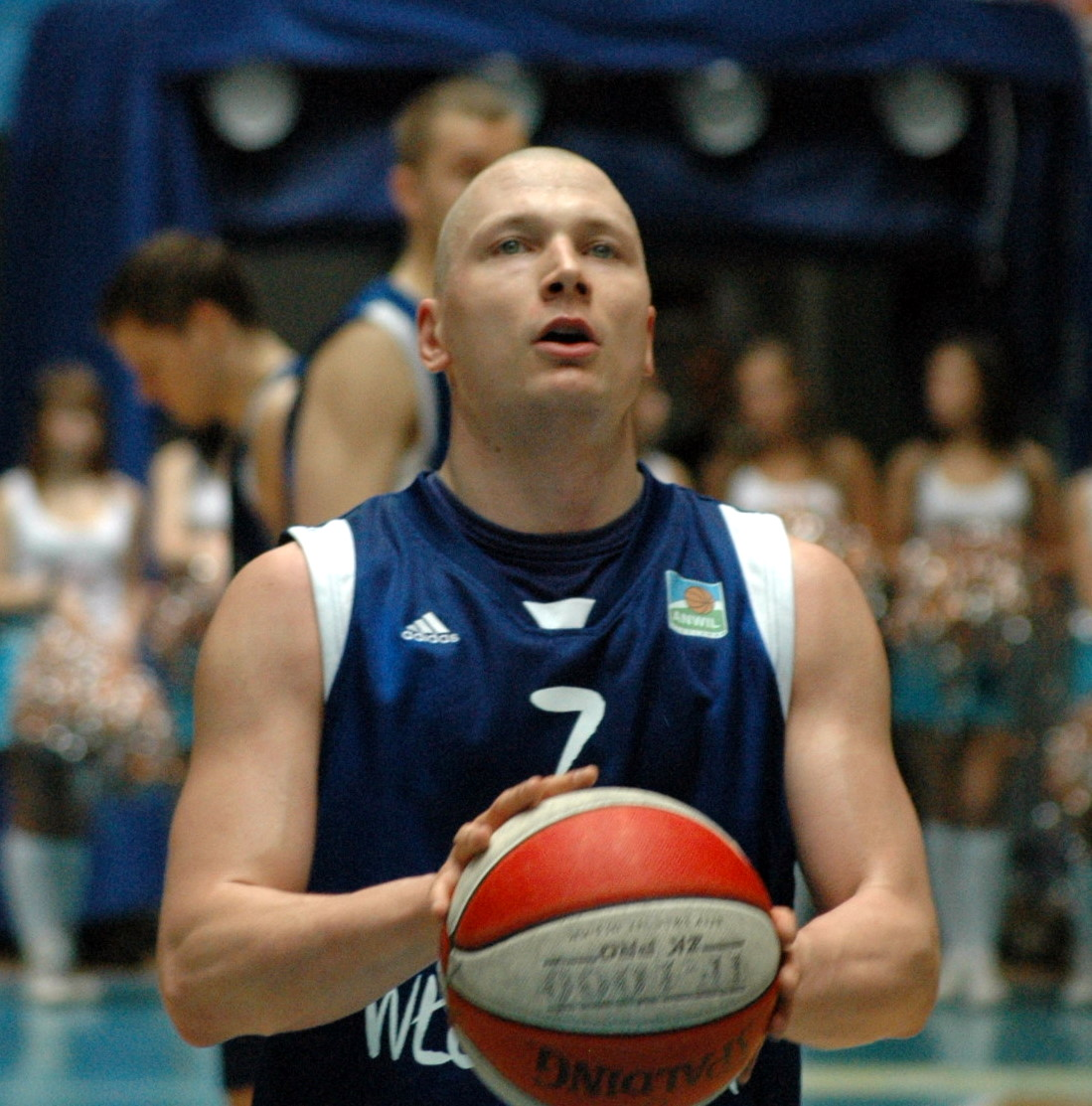
- Szubarga, in 2010.

Personal information
- Born: 5 July 1984 (age 42) Inowrocław, Poland
- Listed height: 178 cm (5 ft 10 in)
- Listed weight: 195 lb (88 kg)

Career information
- Playing career: 2001–2021
- Position: Point guard
- Number: 7

Career history

Playing
- 2001–2005: Noteć Inowrocław
- 2005–2006: Polpak Świecie
- 2006–2007: Sportino Inowrocław
- 2007–2008: Polonia Warszawa
- 2008–2009: Stal Ostrów Wielkopolski
- 2009–2010: Anwil Włocławek
- 2010–2011: Asseco Prokom Gdynia
- 2011–2013: Anwil Włocławek
- 2013–2014: Mykolaiv
- 2014–2016: AZS Koszalin
- 2016–2021: Asseco Gdynia / Arka Gdynia

Coaching
- 2021–2022: Arka Gdynia (assistant)
- 2022–2023: Arka Gdynia
- 2023–2024: Astoria Bydgoszcz
- 2024–2025: Arka Gdynia (assistant)

Career highlights
- Polish League champion (2011); Polish League Top Scorer (2017); 2× All-Polish League Team (2010, 2017); Polish League Best Defender (2013); 2× Plosh League's Best Polish Player (2010, 2017); Polish League assists leader (2010); Polish league steals leader (2012)

Krzysztof Szubarga (born 5 July 1984) is a Polish professional basketball coach and former player. Standing at 1.78 m (5 ft 10 in) tall, he mainly plays at the point guard position. He was most recently was an assistant coach for Arka Gdynia.

== Professional career ==
Szubarga has the majority of his career in the Polish Basketball League. He broke into the league as a 17-year-old and saw action off the bench in the 2001–02 with Inowrocław KS Noteć. Since that time, he has played for several teams and helped Polpak Świecie to a third-place league finish in 2005–06. He played his most recent season, 2008–09, for Stal Ostrów Wielkopolski and averaged a career high 12.3 points, 3.5 rebounds, and 4.5 assists per game.

== National team career ==
Szubarga was also a member of the senior Polish national basketball team. He was selected to play for the host Polish team at the EuroBasket 2009, his first appearance in a major tournament for the national team.

== Coaching career ==
Following retirement, he has started his coaching career by becoming assistant coach for Arka Gdynia of the PLK. On 29 July 2022 he was announced as the new head coach for the Arka Gdynia. On 18 May 2023 he was announced as the new head coach for the Astoria Bydgoszcz.
