= Zdzisław Kasprzak =

Polish basketball player (1910–1971)

Medal record

Representing Poland

Men's basketball

European Championships
Bronze medal – third place	1939 Lithuania	Team competition

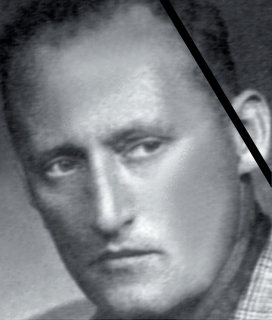
Portrait of Zdzisław Kasprzak

Zdzisław Kasprzak (December 16, 1910 in Poznań – August 5, 1971 in Poznań) was a Polish basketball player who competed in the 1936 Summer Olympics.

He was part of the Polish basketball team, which finished fourth in the Olympic tournament. He played four matches.
