= Polonia Warsaw (basketball) =

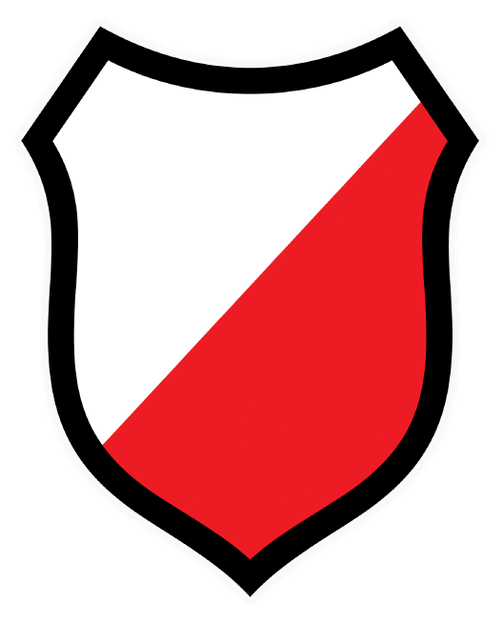
- Nickname: Czarne koszule (Black Shirts)
- Leagues: 1 Men's Basketball League
- Founded: 1927; 98 years ago
- History: 1911, 1927/1928 (basketball department)
- Arena: Sports Hall 'Kolo'
- Capacity: 1,298
- Location: Warsaw, Poland
- Team colors
- President: (Poland) Łukasz Tusiński
- Head coach: (Poland) Jakub Pendrakowski
- Championships: 1 Polish Championship; 3 Polish Basketball Cup
- Website: kks.poloniawarszawa.com
Home	Away

KKS Polonia Warsaw is a Polish professional men's basketball club based in Warsaw, currently playing in the I Liga.

== History ==
The team was founded in 1911. In 1959, the team won the national Polish championship. In the 1959–60 season, Polonia was a semi-finalist in the FIBA European Champions Cup. In 2003, 2004 and 2005 the team reached the PLK Semifinals. The 2010–11 season was the last one for Polonia in the PLK.

== Honours and titles ==
- Polish Championship:

Winners (1): 1959
Runners-up (10): 1929, 1930, 1931, 1932, 1934, 1935, 1939, 1953–54, 1956–57, 1959–60, 1975–76
3rd place (4): 1933, 1971–72, 2003–04, 2004–05

- Polish Cup:

Winners (3): 1934, 1969, 1975

== Notable players ==
Note: Flags indicate national team eligibility at FIBA-sanctioned events. Players may hold other non-FIBA nationalities not displayed.

Criteria

To appear in this section a player must have either:

- Set a club record or won an individual award while at the club
- Played at least one official international match for their national team at any time
- Played at least one official NBA match at any time.

- (Poland) Bohdan Bartosiewicz
- (Kosovo) Dardan Berisha
- (United States) Darnell Hinson
- (Poland) Henryk Jaźnicki
- (Poland) Łukasz Koszarek
- (Poland) Kamil Łączyński
- (Poland) Arkadiusz Miłoszewski
- (United States) Jeff Nordgaard
- (Poland) Andrzej Pasiorowski
- (Poland) Krzysztof Szubarga
- (Poland) Witold Zagórski

== See also ==
- Polonia Warsaw
- Polonia Warsaw (women's basketball)
