= Tadeusz Ulatowski =

Polish basketball player and coach

Personal information
- Born: March 28, 1923 Łódź, Poland

Career history

Playing
- 1946–1947: AZS Warsaw
- 1947–1949: YMCA Lodz

Coaching
- 1951–1959: Legia Warsaw
- 1951–1953: Poland (men's)
- 1952: Poland (women's)

Tadeusz Ulatowski (1923–2012) was a Polish basketball player and coach.

Later he became a involved in running various sports organisations including the Polish Olympic Committee and became an academic sports scientist and researcher.
