= Ryszard Olszewski =

Polish basketball player (1932–2020)

Personal information
- Born: 7 June 1932 Inowrocław, Poland
- Died: 2 February 2020 (aged 87) Toruń, Poland
- Listed height: 185 cm (6 ft 1 in)
- Listed weight: 87 kg (192 lb)

Ryszard Olszewski (7 June 1932 – 2 February 2020) was a Polish basketball player. He competed in the men's tournament at the 1960 Summer Olympics.
