= Zdzisław Myrda =

Polish basketball player (1951–2020)

Personal information
- Nationality: Polish
- Born: 29 January 1951 Siedliska, Poland
- Died: 6 July 2020 (aged 69)
- Height: 6 ft 8 in (203 cm)

Sport
- Sport: Basketball

Zdzisław Myrda (29 January 1951 – 6 July 2020) was a Polish basketball player. He competed in the men's tournament at the 1980 Summer Olympics.

Myrda died on 6 July 2020 at the age of 69.
