= Piotr Langosz =

Polish basketball player (born 1951)

Personal information
- Nationality: Polish
- Born: 5 April 1951 (age 74); Świętochłowice, Poland

Sport
- Sport: Basketball

Piotr Langosz (born 5 April 1951) is a Polish former basketball player. He competed in the men's tournament at the 1972 Summer Olympics.
