= Czesław Malec =

Polish basketball player (1941–2018)

Personal information
- Nationality: Polish
- Born: 26 June 1941; Kremenets, Ukrainian SSR, Soviet Union
- Died: 18 July 2018 (aged 77); Assevent, France

Sport
- Sport: Basketball

Czesław Malec (26 June 1941 – 18 July 2018) was a Polish basketball player. He competed in the men's tournament at the 1968 Summer Olympics.

He died on 18 July 2018 aged 77.

== Honours ==
Wisła Kraków

- Polish basketball championship (3): 1961–62, 1963–64, 1967–68

Poland

- EuroBasket third place: 1965, 1967
