= Andrzej Kasprzak =

Polish basketball player (1946–2023)

Personal information
- Nationality: Polish
- Born: 14 March 1946; Lublin, Poland
- Died: 24 August 2023 (aged 77)

Sport
- Sport: Basketball

Andrzej Kasprzak (14 March 1946 – 24 August 2023) was a Polish basketball player. He competed in the men's tournament at the 1968 Summer Olympics, and the 1972 Summer Olympics.

Kasprzak died on 24 August 2023, at the age of 77.
