= Tadeusz Pacuła =

Polish basketball player (1932–1984)

Personal information
- Nationality: Polish
- Born: 25 July 1932; Kraków, Poland
- Died: 16 May 1984 (aged 51); Kraków, Poland

Sport
- Sport: Basketball

Tadeusz Pacuła (25 July 1932 – 16 May 1984) was a Polish basketball player. He competed in the men's tournament at the 1960 Summer Olympics.
