= Bohdan Likszo =

Polish basketball player (1940–1993)

Personal information
- Born: 1 January 1940 Wilno, Soviet occupated Poland (now: Vilnius, Lithuania)
- Died: 11 December 1993 (aged 53) Kraków, Poland
- Listed height: 6 ft 6.5 in (1.99 m)
- Listed weight: 234 lb (106 kg)

Career information
- Playing career: 1955–1971
- Position: Center

Career history
- 1955–1959: Warmia Olsztyn
- 1959–1971: Wisła Kraków

Career highlights
- FIBA World Cup Top Scorer (1967); FIBA European Selection (1966); 3× Polish League champion (1962, 1964, 1968); 2× Polish League Top Scorer (1968, 1969)
Medals
Representing Poland
Men's basketball
EuroBasket
Silver medal – second place	1963 Poland
Bronze medal – third place	1965 Soviet Union
Bronze medal – third place	1967 Finland

Bohdan Stanisław Likszo (alternate spelling: Bogdan) (1 January 1940 in Vilnius (Wilno), Soviet occupied Poland – 11 December 1993 in Kraków) was a Polish professional basketball player. At a height of 1.99 m (6'6 1/2") tall, and a weight of 106 kg (234 lbs.), he played at the center position.

== Professional career ==
Likszo was a member of the FIBA European Selection, in 1966.

== National team career ==
As a member of the senior Polish national basketball team, Likszo competed at the 1964 Summer Olympics, and the 1968 Summer Olympics. Likszo was the top scorer at the 1967 FIBA World Championship.

He won the silver medal at the 1963 EuroBasket, and bronze medals at EuroBasket 1965, and EuroBasket 1967.

== Awards and accomplishments ==
=== Clubs ===
- 3× Polish League Champion: (1962, 1964, 1968)
- FIBA European Selection: (1966)
- 2× Polish League Top Scorer: (1968, 1969)

=== Polish senior national team ===
- EuroBasket 1963: Silver
- EuroBasket 1965: Bronze
- EuroBasket 1967: Bronze
- FIBA World Cup Top Scorer: (1967)
