= Franciszek Niemiec =

Polish basketball player (born 1950)

Personal information
- Nationality: Polish
- Born: 3 March 1950 (age 75); Gorlice, Poland

Sport
- Sport: Basketball

Franciszek Niemiec (born 3 March 1950) is a Polish former basketball player. He competed in the men's tournament at the 1972 Summer Olympics.
