= Andrzej Nartowski =

Polish basketball player (1931–2003)

Personal information
- Nationality: Polish
- Born: 14 November 1931; Kalisz, Poland
- Died: 3 September 2003 (aged 71); Paris, France

Sport
- Sport: Basketball

Andrzej Nartowski (14 November 1931 – 3 September 2003) was a Polish basketball player. He competed in the men's tournament at the 1960 Summer Olympics.
