= Bohdan Przywarski =

Polish basketball player (1932–2013)

Personal information
- Full name: Bohdan Władysław Przywarski
- Nationality: Polish
- Born: 12 April 1932; Braslaw, Poland, now Belarus
- Died: 21 October 2013 (aged 81); Warsaw, Poland

Sport
- Sport: Basketball

Bohdan Przywarski (12 April 1932 – 21 October 2013) was a Polish basketball player. He competed in the men's tournament at the 1960 Summer Olympics. He coached the Morocco national team.
