= Wojciech Rosiński =

Polish basketball player (born 1955)

Personal information
- Nationality: Polish
- Born: 21 February 1955 (age 70); Inowrocław, Poland

Sport
- Sport: Basketball

Wojciech Rosiński (born 21 February 1955) is a Polish former basketball player. He competed in the men's tournament at the 1980 Summer Olympics.
