= Dominik Olejniczak =

Polish basketball player (born 1996)

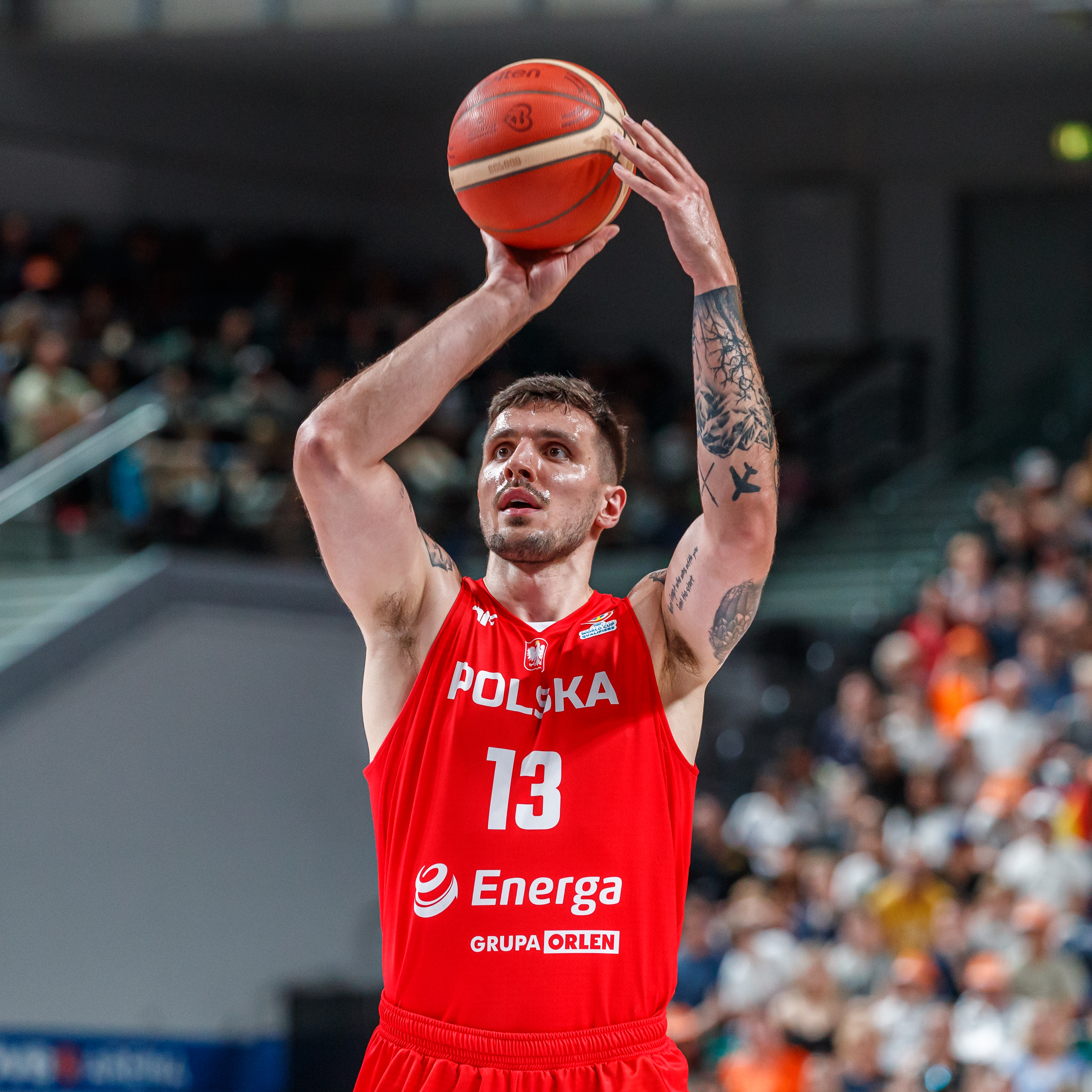
- Olejniczak with Poland in 2022

No. 17 – Derthona Basket
- Position: Center
- League: LBA; EuroCup

Personal information
- Born: 1 July 1996 (age 30) Toruń, Poland
- Listed height: 2.13 m (7 ft 0 in)
- Listed weight: 118 kg (260 lb)

Career information
- College: Drake (2015–2016); Ole Miss (2017–2019); Florida State (2019–2020)
- NBA draft: 2020: undrafted
- Playing career: 2012–present

Career history
- 2012–2015: SMS Wladyslawowo
- 2020–2021: Trefl Sopot
- 2021–2023: BCM Gravelines-Dunkerque
- 2023–2025: Saint-Quentin
- 2025–present: Bertram Derthona

Career highlights
- LNB Pro A rebounding leader (2025)

Dominik Olejniczak (born 1 July 1996) is a Polish professional basketball player for Derthona of the Italian Lega Basket Serie A (LBA) and the EuroCup. He played college basketball for the Drake Bulldogs, the Ole Miss Rebels and the Florida State Seminoles.

== College career ==
Olejniczak played for Drake as a freshman. In his sophomore and junior seasons, he played for Ole Miss. As a senior, he played for Florida State.

== Professional career ==
On 1 July 2020, Olejniczak signed with Trefl Sopot of the Polish Basketball League.

On 6 July 2021 he signed with BCM Gravelines-Dunkerque of the LNB Pro A.

During the 2022-2023 season, he was named to the "All-Star-Game LNB" for the first time in his career, with BCM Gravelines Dunkerque.

On 12 July 2023 he signed with Saint-Quentin of the LNB Pro A.

On June 27, 2025, he became a player of Bertram Derthona from the Lega Basket Serie A.

== National team career ==
Olejniczak played for Poland at the under-18 and under-20 levels before making his senior international debut for the team in 2016. He represented Poland at the 2014 Summer Youth Olympics and the EuroBasket 2017. Olejniczak helped Poland finish in eighth place at the 2019 FIBA Basketball World Cup.

== Career statistics ==
Legend
GP	Games played	GS	Games started	MPG	Minutes per game
FG%	Field goal percentage	3P%	3-point field goal percentage	FT%	Free throw percentage
RPG	Rebounds per game	APG	Assists per game	SPG	Steals per game
BPG	Blocks per game	PPG	Points per game	**Bold**	Career high

=== College ===
Year	Team	GP	GS	MPG	FG%	3P%	FT%	RPG	APG	SPG	BPG	PPG
2015–16	Drake	30	8	16.4	**.722**	–	.682	**4.1**	.3	.2	.7	**6.5**
2016–17	Ole Miss	Redshirt										
2017–18	Ole Miss	32	11	14.1	.531	–	.643	2.6	.4	.4	.6	4.3
2018–19	Ole Miss	**33**	**22**	**18.3**	.575	–	**.763**	3.0	**.7**	**.5**	**.9**	5.3
2019–20	Florida State	29	9	10.7	.611	–	.684	2.3	.1	.3	.6	4.2
Career		124	50	15.0	.609	–	.698	3.0	.4	.4	.7	5.1
