= Florian Grzechowiak =

Polish basketball player (1914–1972)

Personal information
- Born: June 7, 1914 Bottrop, German Empire
- Died: July 24, 1972 (aged 58) Poznań, Poland
Medals
Representing Poland
Men's basketball
European Championships
Bronze medal – third place	1939 Lithuania	Team competition

Florian Grzechowiak (June 7, 1914 in Bottrop, Germany – July 24, 1972 in Poznań) was a Polish basketball player who competed in the 1936 Summer Olympics.

He was part of the Polish basketball team, which finished fourth in the Olympic tournament. He played five matches.
