= Krzysztof Sitkowski =

Polish basketball player (1935–1988)

Personal information
- Full name: Krzysztof Marek Sitkowski
- Nationality: Polish
- Born: 21 November 1935 Warsaw, Poland
- Died: 4 February 1988 (aged 52) Warsaw, Poland
- Height: 180 cm (5.9 ft)
- Weight: 69 kg (152 lb)

Sport
- Sport: Basketball

Krzysztof Marek Sitkowski (21 November 1935 – 4 February 1988) was a Polish basketball player. He competed in the men's tournament at the 1960 Summer Olympics and the 1964 Summer Olympics.
