= Jerzy Piskun =

Polish basketball player (1938–2018)

Personal information
- Nationality: Polish
- Born: 4 June 1938; Pinsk, Poland (now Belarus)
- Died: 16 July 2018 (aged 80)

Sport
- Sport: Basketball

Jerzy Piskun (4 June 1938 – 16 July 2018) was a Polish basketball player. He competed in the men's tournament at the 1960 Summer Olympics and the 1964 Summer Olympics.

== Honours ==
Polonia Warsaw

- Polish basketball championship (1): 1958–59

Poland

- EuroBasket runner-up: 1963
- EuroBasket third place: 1965
