= Eugeniusz Durejko =

Polish basketball player (born 1950)

Personal information
- Nationality: Polish
- Born: 15 November 1950 (age 74); Ostróda, Poland

Sport
- Sport: Basketball

Eugeniusz Durejko (born 15 November 1950) is a Polish former basketball player. He competed in the men's tournament at the 1972 Summer Olympics.
