= Stanisław Olejniczak =

Polish basketball player (1938–2022)

Personal information
- Nationality: Polish
- Born: 28 March 1938; Zbąszyń, Poland
- Died: 1 February 2022 (aged 83)

Sport
- Sport: Basketball

Stanisław Feliks Olejniczak (28 March 1938 – 1 February 2022) was a Polish basketball player. He competed in the men's tournament at the 1964 Summer Olympics.

He died on 1 February 2022, at the age of 83.
