= Zbigniew Dregier =

Polish basketball player (born 1935)

Personal information
- Nationality: Polish
- Born: 17 July 1935 (age 91) Cumań, Poland

Sport
- Sport: Basketball

Zbigniew Dregier (born 17 July 1935) is a Polish former basketball player. He competed in the men's tournament at the 1960 Summer Olympics, and the 1964 Summer Olympics.
