= Kazimierz Frelkiewicz =

Polish basketball player (born 1940)

Personal information
- Nationality: Polish
- Born: 20 February 1940 (age 86) Pogrzybów, Poland

Sport
- Sport: Basketball

Kazimierz Frelkiewicz (born 20 February 1940) is a Polish former basketball player. He competed in the men's tournament at the 1964 Summer Olympics, and the 1968 Summer Olympics.
