= Bolesław Kwiatkowski =

Polish basketball player (1942–2021)

Personal information
- Born: 28 July 1942 Warsaw, Poland
- Died: 13 February 2021 (aged 78) Sydney, Australia
- Listed height: 185 cm (6 ft 1 in)
- Listed weight: 81 kg (179 lb)

Bolesław Kwiatkowski (28 July 1942 – 13 February 2021) was a Polish basketball player. He competed in the men's tournament at the 1968 Summer Olympics.
