= Andrzej Perka =

Polish basketball player (born 1941)

Personal information
- Nationality: Polish
- Born: 16 February 1941 (age 84); Warsaw, Poland

Sport
- Sport: Basketball

Andrzej Perka (born 16 February 1941) is a Polish former basketball player. He competed in the men's tournament at the 1964 Summer Olympics.
