= Witold Zagórski =

Polish basketball player and coach

Personal information
- Born: 25 September 1930 Warsaw, Poland
- Died: 30 June 2016 (aged 85)

Career information
- Playing career: 1950–1961

Career history
- 1950–1960: Polonia Warszawa
- 1960–1961: CWKS Legia Warszawa

Career highlights
- As a player: 2× Polish League champion (1959, 1961); As a head coach: 7× FIBA European Selection Team (1967–1973)
Medals
Men's basketball
Head coach for Poland
FIBA EuroBasket
Silver medal – second place	1963 Wroclaw
Bronze medal – third place	1965 Moscow
Bronze medal – third place	1967 Helsinki

Witold Edward Zagórski (25 September 1930 – 30 June 2016) was a Polish professional basketball player and coach.

== Playing career ==
=== Club career ===
During his club playing career, Zagórski was a player of the Polish teams Polonia Warszawa (1950–1960), and CWKS Legia Warszawa (1960–1961). He won two Polish League championships, in 1959 and 1961.

=== Polish national team ===
Zagórski was a member of the senior Polish national basketball team, in 49 games (1951–1956). With Poland, he played at 1955 FIBA EuroBasket.

== Coaching career ==
=== Clubs ===
Zagórski was chosen to be the head coach of the FIBA European Selection Team on 7 occasions (1967, 1968, 1969, 1970, 1971, 1972, 1973).

=== National team ===
Zagórski was the head coach the senior Polish national basketball team, (1961–1975). With Poland, he finished in 5th place at the 1967 FIBA World Championship. He also won three medals at the FIBA EuroBasket: silver (1963) and bronze (1965 and 1967).

With Zagórski as the team's head coach, Poland's senior national team also played at three Summer Olympic Games (1964 Tokyo, 1968 Mexico City, and 1972 Munich).

== Personal life ==
Zagórski died on 30 June 2016, at the age of 85.

== Sources ==
- "Zagórski Witold". Internetowa encyklopedia PWN (in Polish).
- "Zagórski Witold". WIEM Encyclopedia (in Polish). Archived from the original on 2016-08-07.
