= Andrzej Pasiorowski =

Polish basketball player (born 1946)

Personal information
- Nationality: Polish
- Born: 4 May 1946 (age 79) Rawa Mazowiecka, Poland

Sport
- Sport: Basketball

Andrzej Pasiorowski (born 4 May 1946) is a Polish former basketball player. He competed in the men's tournament at the 1968 Summer Olympics, and the 1972 Summer Olympics.
