= Krzysztof Fikiel =

Polish basketball player (born 1958)

Personal information
- Nationality: Polish
- Born: 3 February 1958 (age 67); Rdziostów, Poland

Sport
- Sport: Basketball

Krzysztof Fikiel (born 3 February 1958) is a Polish former basketball player. He competed in the men's tournament at the 1980 Summer Olympics. At a height 6'9", he played center in his time in EuroBasket, averaging 11.3 points.
