= Andrej Urlep =

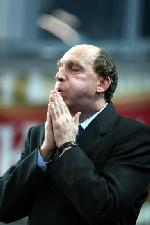

Spójnia Stargard
- Position: Head coach
- League: PLK

Personal information
- Born: July 19, 1957 (age 69) Ljubljana, SR Slovenia, SFR Yugoslavia
- Coaching career: 1997–present

Career history

Coaching
- 1997–1999: Śląsk Wrocław
- 1999–2000: Jezica Ljubljana
- 2000–2002: Śląsk Wrocław
- 2002–2006: Anwil Włocławek
- 2006–2008: Śląsk Wrocław
- 2009–2010: Turów Zgorzelec
- 2011: AZS Koszalin
- 2013–2014: Czarni Słupsk
- 2014–2017: BC Dzūkija
- 2017–2018: Stelmet Zielona Góra
- 2018–2019: BC Dzūkija
- 2019–2021: Mono Vampire
- 2021–2023: Śląsk Wrocław
- 2024–present: Spójnia Stargard

Career highlights
- PLK Best Coach (2001); PLK champion (1998, 1999, 2001, 2002, 2003, 2022)

Andrej Urlep (born July 19, 1957) is a Slovenian professional basketball coach who serves as the head coach for Spójnia Stargard of the Polish Basketball League (PLK).

He is credited with reforming and modernising Polish domestic basketball.

For the 2019-2020 season, the Mono Vampire Basketball Club of Thailand announced that Urlep would be their head coach for the season. Urlep is a five-time Polish Basketball League Champion as a coach, and a two-times vice-champion. He also coached Slovenia's U22 team during the early stage of his career.

On October 11, 2021, he has signed with Śląsk Wrocław of the Polish Basketball League.
