= Justyn Węglorz =

Polish basketball player (born 1958)

Personal information
- Nationality: Polish
- Born: 27 May 1958 (age 68) Rybnik, Poland

Sport
- Sport: Basketball

Justyn Węglorz (born 27 May 1958) is a Polish former basketball player. He competed in the men's tournament at the 1980 Summer Olympics.
