= Janusz Cegliński =

Polish basketball player (1949–2026)

Personal information
- Nationality: Polish
- Born: 6 April 1949 Gdańsk, Poland
- Died: 4 March 2026 (aged 76)

Sport
- Sport: Basketball

Janusz Cegliński (6 April 1949 – 4 March 2026) was a Polish basketball player. He competed in the men's tournament at the 1972 Summer Olympics. Cegliński died on 4 March 2026, at the age of 76.
