= Ireneusz Mulak =

Polish basketball player (born 1956)

Personal information
- Full name: Ireneusz Tadeusz Mulak
- Born: 30 March 1956 (age 70) Lublin, Poland
- Height: 195 cm (6 ft 5 in)
- Weight: 91 kg (201 lb)

Sport
- Sport: Basketball
- Club: Start Lublin

Ireneusz Tadeusz Mulak (born 30 March 1956) is a Polish former basketball player. He competed in the men's tournament at the 1980 Summer Olympics.
