= Adam Niemiec =

Polish basketball player (1947–2025)

Personal information
- Full name: Adam Maria Niemiec
- Born: 8 September 1947 Milanówek, Poland
- Died: 10 September 2025 (aged 78) Vienna, Austria
- Height: 191 cm (6 ft 3 in)
- Weight: 81 kg (179 lb)

Sport
- Sport: Basketball
- Club: AZS Warszawa

Adam Maria Niemiec (8 September 1947 – 10 September 2025) was a Polish basketball player. He competed in the men's tournament at the 1968 Summer Olympics. Niemiec died in Vienna, Austria on 10 September 2025, two days after his 78th birthday.
