= Włodzimierz Trams =

Polish basketball player (1944–2021)

Personal information
- Nationality: Polish
- Born: 12 May 1944; Warsaw, Poland
- Died: 31 October 2021 (aged 77)

Sport
- Sport: Basketball

Włodzimierz Bonifacy Trams (12 May 1944 – 31 October 2021) was a Polish basketball player. He competed in the men's tournament at the 1968 Summer Olympics.
