= Jan Dolczewski =

Polish basketball player (born 1948)

Personal information
- Nationality: Polish
- Born: 11 July 1948 (age 76); Leszno, Poland

Sport
- Sport: Basketball

Jan Dolczewski (born 11 July 1948) is a Polish former basketball player. He competed in the men's tournament at the 1972 Summer Olympics.
