= Andrzej Pstrokoński =

Polish basketball player (1936–2022)

Personal information
- Full name: Andrzej Stefan Pstrokoński
- Nationality: Polish
- Born: 28 June 1936; Warsaw, Poland
- Died: 24 December 2022 (aged 86)

Sport
- Sport: Basketball

Andrzej Stefan Pstrokoński (28 June 1936 – 24 December 2022) was a Polish basketball player. He competed in the men's tournament at the 1960 Summer Olympics, and the 1964 Summer Olympics.
