= Andrzej Seweryn (basketball) =

Polish basketball player (born 1948)

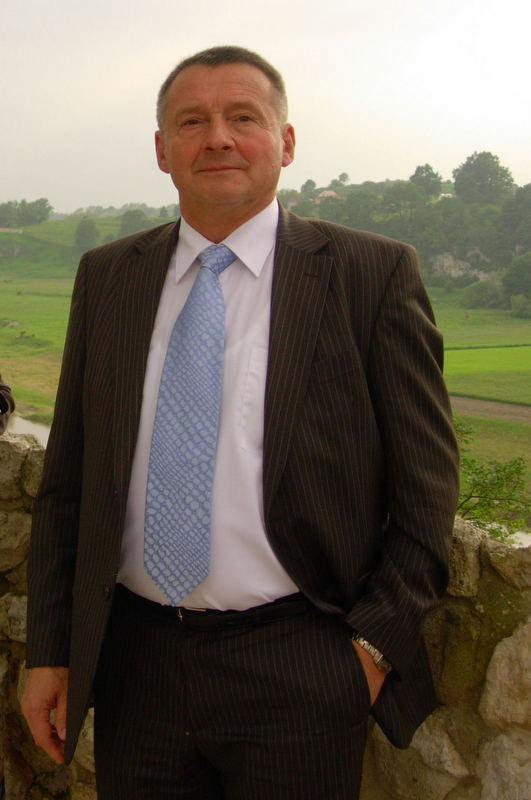
- Andrzej Seweryn in 2010

Personal information
- Nationality: Polish
- Born: 27 November 1948 (age 76); Kraków, Poland

Sport
- Sport: Basketball

Andrzej Wojciech Seweryn (born 27 November 1948) is a Polish former basketball player. He competed in the men's tournament at the 1972 Summer Olympics.
