= Grzegorz Korcz =

Polish basketball player (born 1946)

Personal information
- Nationality: Polish
- Born: 9 May 1946 (age 78); Śródza, Poland

Sport
- Sport: Basketball

Grzegorz Korcz (born 9 May 1946) is a Polish former basketball player. He competed in the men's tournament at the 1968 Summer Olympics, and the 1972 Summer Olympics.
