= Henryk Cegielski =

Polish basketball player (1945–2015)

Personal information
- Nationality: Polish
- Born: 31 December 1945; Leszno, Poland
- Died: 4 February 2015 (aged 69); Luxembourg

Sport
- Sport: Basketball

Henryk Sylwester Cegielski (31 December 1945 – 4 February 2015) was a Polish basketball player. He competed in the men's tournament at the 1968 Summer Olympics.
