= Basketball at the 1964 Summer Olympics – Men's team rosters =

Olympic basketball rosters

The following is the list of squads for each of the 16 teams that competed in the men's basketball tournament at the 1964 Summer Olympics.

== Group A ==
=== Canada ===
The following players represented Canada:

- Barry Howson
- Fred Ingaldson
- George Stulac
- James Maguire
- John McKibbon
- Joseph Stulac
- Keith Hartley
- Ruby Richman
- Rolly Goldring
- Walter Birtles
- Warren Reynolds

=== Hungary ===
The following players represented Hungary:

- András Haán
- Árpád Glatz
- György Pólik
- János Bencze
- János Greminger
- János Rácz
- József Prieszol
- László Gabányi
- Miklós Boháty
- Ödön Lendvay
- Pál Koczka
- Tibor Kangyal

=== Italy ===
The following players represented Italy:

- Augusto Giomo
- Franco Bertini
- Gabriele Vianello
- Gianfranco Lombardi
- Gianfranco Pieri
- Gianfranco Sardagna
- Giovanni Gavagnin
- Giusto Pellanera
- Massimo Masini
- Ottorino Flaborea
- Paolo Vittori
- Sauro Bufalini

=== Japan ===
The following players represented Japan:

- Akira Kodama
- Fumihiko Moroyama
- Kaoru Wakabayashi
- Katsuji Tsunoda
- Katsuo Bai
- Kunihiko Nakamura
- Masashi Shiga
- Nobuo Kaiho
- Seiji Fujie
- Setsuo Nara
- Takashi Masuda
- Yoshitaka Egawa

=== Mexico ===
The following players represented Mexico:

- Alberto Almanza
- Armando Herrera
- Carlos Quintanar
- Eulalio Avila
- Luis Grajeda
- Manuel Raga
- Mario Peña
- Miguel Arellano
- Rafael Heredia
- Rico Pontvianne

=== Poland ===
The following players represented Poland:

- Andrzej Perka
- Andrzej Pstrokoński
- Bohdan Likszo
- Janusz Wichowski
- Jerzy Piskun
- Kazimierz Frelkiewicz
- Krystian Czernichowski
- Krzysztof Sitkowski
- Mieczysław Łopatka
- Stanisław Olejniczak
- Tadeusz Blauth
- Zbigniew Dregier

=== Puerto Rico ===
The following players represented Puerto Rico:

- Alberto Zamot
- Ángel Cancel
- Ángel García
- Evelio Droz
- Jaime Frontera
- Juan Vicéns
- Juan Báez
- Martín Ansa
- Rubén Adorno
- Teo Cruz
- Tomás Gutiérrez
- Bill McCadney

=== Soviet Union ===
The following players represented the Soviet Union:

- Jānis Krūmiņš
- Valdis Muižnieks
- Mykola Bahlei
- Armenak Alachachian
- Aleksandr Travin
- Vyacheslav Khrynin
- Levan Moseshvili
- Yuri Korneev
- Aleksandr Petrov
- Gennady Volnov
- Jaak Lipso
- Juris Kalniņš

== Group B ==
=== Australia ===
The following players represented Australia:

- Brendon Hackwill
- Carl Rodwell
- John Gardiner
- John Heard
- Ken Cole
- László Hódi
- Lindsay Gaze
- Michael Ah Matt
- Mike Dancis
- Scott Davie
- Werner Linde
- Bill Wyatt

=== Brazil ===
The following players represented Brazil:

- Amaury
- Wlamir Marques
- Bira
- Mosquito
- Jatyr
- Rosa Branca
- Edson Bispo
- Sucar
- Fritz
- Victor Mirshauswka
- Sérgio Macarrão
- Edvar Simões

=== Finland ===
The following players represented Finland:

- Jorma Pilkevaara
- Juha Harjula
- Kari Liimo
- Kauko Kauppinen
- Martti Liimo
- Pertti Laanti
- Raimo Lindholm
- Raimo Vartia
- Risto Kala
- Teijo Finneman
- Timo Lampén
- Uolevi Manninen

=== Peru ===
The following players represented Peru:

- Carlos Vásquez
- Enrique Duarte
- Jorge Vargas
- José Guzmán
- Luis Duarte
- Manuel Valerio
- Óscar Benalcázar
- Óscar Sevilla
- Raúl Duarte
- Ricardo Duarte
- Simón Peredes
- Tomás Sangio

=== South Korea ===
The following players represented South Korea:

- Bang Yeol
- Jeong Jin-bong
- Ha Ui-geon
- Kim Jong-seon
- Kim In-geon
- Kim Mu-hyeon
- Kim Seung-gyu
- Kim Yeong-il
- Kim Yeong-gi
- Lee Byeong-gu
- Mun Hyeon-jang
- Sin Dong-pa

=== United States ===
The following players represented the United States:

- Jim Barnes
- Bill Bradley
- Larry Brown
- Joe Caldwell
- Mel Counts
- Dick Davies
- Walt Hazzard
- Luke Jackson
- Pete McCaffrey
- Jeff Mullins
- Jerry Shipp
- Jiff Wilson

=== Uruguay ===
The following players represented Uruguay:

- Alvaro Roca
- Edison Ciavattone
- Jorge Maya
- Julio César Gómez
- Luis García
- Luis Koster
- Manuel Gadea
- Ramiro de León
- Sergio Pisano
- Waldemar Rial
- Walter Márquez
- Washington Poyet

=== Yugoslavia ===
The following players represented Yugoslavia:

Yugoslavia men's national basketball team roster
Players
Coaches

Pos.	No.	Name	Age – Date of birth	Height	Club
	4	Slobodan Gordić	27 – 28 September 1937	1.92 m (6 ft 4 in)	OKK Beograd	(Socialist Federal Republic of Yugoslavia)
PF	5	Radivoj Korać	25 – 5 November 1938	1.95 m (6 ft 5 in)	OKK Beograd	(Socialist Federal Republic of Yugoslavia)
C	6	Trajko Rajković	26 – 7 December 1937	2.04 m (6 ft 8 in)	OKK Beograd	(Socialist Federal Republic of Yugoslavia)
	7	Dragan Kovačić	25 – 5 October 1939	1.93 m (6 ft 4 in)	Lokomotiva Zagreb	(Socialist Federal Republic of Yugoslavia)
PG	8	Josip Gjergja	26 – 24 November 1937	1.76 m (5 ft 9 in)	Zadar	(Socialist Federal Republic of Yugoslavia)
	9	Dragoslav Ražnatović	23 – 19 April 1941	1.90 m (6 ft 3 in)	Radnički Belgrade	(Socialist Federal Republic of Yugoslavia)
PG	10	Ivo Daneu	27 – 6 October 1937	1.91 m (6 ft 3 in)	AŠK Olimpija	(Socialist Federal Republic of Yugoslavia)
C	11	Zvonko Petričević	24 – 26 July 1940	2.10 m (6 ft 11 in)	Lokomotiva Zagreb	(Socialist Federal Republic of Yugoslavia)
	12	Vital Eiselt	23 – 6 May 1941	1.87 m (6 ft 2 in)	AŠK Olimpija	(Socialist Federal Republic of Yugoslavia)
F	13	Vladimir Cvetković	23 – 24 May 1941	1.96 m (6 ft 5 in)	Crvena zvezda	(Socialist Federal Republic of Yugoslavia)
PF	14	Nemanja Đurić	28 – 18 June 1936	1.95 m (6 ft 5 in)	Radnički Belgrade	(Socialist Federal Republic of Yugoslavia)
	15	Miodrag Nikolić	26 – 22 August 1938	1.88 m (6 ft 2 in)	OKK Beograd	(Socialist Federal Republic of Yugoslavia)

Head coach

- (Socialist Federal Republic of Yugoslavia) Aleksandar Nikolić

Assistant coach(es)

- (Socialist Federal Republic of Yugoslavia) Ranko Žeravica

Legend

- Club – describes last
  club before the tournament
- Age – describes age
  on 11 October 1964
