= Basketball at the 1960 Summer Olympics – Men's team rosters =

Olympic basketball rosters

The following is the list of squads for each of the 16 teams that competed in the men's basketball tournament at the 1960 Summer Olympics.

== Group A ==
=== Hungary ===
The following players represented Hungary:

- Árpád Glatz
- György Pólik
- István Liptay
- János Bencze
- János Greminger
- János Simon
- László Bánhegyi
- László Gabányi
- Miklós Boháty
- Ottó Temesvári
- Tibor Zsíros
- Zoltán Judik

=== Italy ===
The following players represented Italy:

- Achille Canna
- Sandro Gamba
- Sandro Riminucci
- Antonio Calebotta
- Augusto Giomo
- Gabriele Vianello
- Gianfranco Lombardi
- Gianfranco Pieri
- Gianfranco Sardagna
- Giovanni Gavagnin
- Mario Alesini
- Paolo Vittori

=== Japan ===
The following players represented Japan:

- Hiroshi Saito
- Hideo Kanekawa
- Kaoru Wakabayashi
- Kenichi Imaizumi
- Masashi Shiga
- Yasukuni Oshima
- Setsuo Nara
- Shoji Kamata
- Shutaro Shoji
- Takeo Sugiyama
- Takashi Itoyama
- Takashi Masuda

=== United States ===
The following players represented the United States:

United States men's national basketball team – 1960 Summer Olympics roster
Players
Coaches

Pos.	No.	Name	Age – Date of birth	Height	Club	Ctr.
G	13	Jay Arnette	21 – 19 December 1938	1.88 m (6 ft 2 in)	Texas	(United States)
C	4	Walt Bellamy	21 – 24 July 1939	2.11 m (6 ft 11 in)	Indiana	(United States)
F	5	Bob Boozer	23 – 26 April 1937	2.03 m (6 ft 8 in)	Peoria Caterpillars	(United States)
F	6	Terry Dischinger	19 – 21 November 1940	2.01 m (6 ft 7 in)	Purdue	(United States)
F	7	Burdette Haldorson	26 – 12 January 1934	2.06 m (6 ft 9 in)	Phillips 66ers	(United States)
C	8	Darrall Imhoff	21 – 11 October 1938	2.08 m (6 ft 10 in)	California	(United States)
G	9	Allen Kelley	27 – 24 December 1932	1.80 m (5 ft 11 in)	Peoria Caterpillars	(United States)
G	10	Lester Lane	28 – 6 March 1932	1.78 m (5 ft 10 in)	Wichita Vickers	(United States)
F	11	Jerry Lucas	20 – 30 March 1940	2.03 m (6 ft 8 in)	Ohio State	(United States)
F	14	Oscar Robertson	21 – 24 November 1938	1.96 m (6 ft 5 in)	Cincinnati	(United States)
G	12	Adrian Smith	23 – 5 October 1936	1.85 m (6 ft 1 in)	U.S. Armed Forces	(United States)
G	3	Jerry West	22 – 28 May 1938	1.91 m (6 ft 3 in)	West Virginia	(United States)

Head coach

(United States) Pete Newell

Legend

- Club – describes last
  club before the tournament
- Age – describes age
  on 26 August 1960

== Group B ==
=== Bulgaria ===
The following players represented Bulgaria:

- Atanas Atanasov
- Emanuil Gyaurov
- Georgi Kanev
- Georgi Panov
- Iliya Mirchev
- Khristo Tsvetkov
- Lyubomir Panov
- Nikolay Ilov
- Petko Lazarov
- Stefan Stoykov
- Tsvetko Slavov
- Viktor Radev

=== Czechoslovakia ===
The following players represented Czechoslovakia:

- Bohumil Tomášek
- Bohuslav Rylich
- Boris Lukášik
- Dušan Lukášik
- František Konvička
- Jaroslav Tetiva
- Jiří Baumruk
- Jiří Šťastný
- Jindřich Kinský
- Vladimír Pištělák
- Zdeněk Bobrovský
- Zdeněk Konečný

=== France ===
The following players represented France:

- Bernard Mayeur
- Christian Baltzer
- Henri Grange
- Henri Villecourt
- Robert Monclar
- Jean Degros
- Jean-Paul Beugnot
- Jérôme Christ
- Louis Bertorelle
- Max Dorigo
- Philippe Baillet
- Roger Antoine

=== Yugoslavia ===
The following players represented Yugoslavia:

Yugoslavia men's national basketball team roster
Players
Coaches

Pos.	No.	Name	Age – Date of birth	Height	Club
	3	Miodrag Nikolić	22 – 22 August 1938	1.88 m (6 ft 2 in)	OKK Beograd	(Socialist Federal Republic of Yugoslavia)
	4	Marjan Kandus	27 – 23 September 1932	1.86 m (6 ft 1 in)	AŠK Olimpija	(Socialist Federal Republic of Yugoslavia)
PF	5	Radivoj Korać	21 – 5 November 1938	1.95 m (6 ft 5 in)	OKK Beograd	(Socialist Federal Republic of Yugoslavia)
	6	Miha Lokar	24 – 10 September 1935	1.82 m (6 ft 0 in)	AŠK Olimpija	(Socialist Federal Republic of Yugoslavia)
	7	Boris Kristančič	28 – 2 January 1932	1.76 m (5 ft 9 in)	AŠK Olimpija	(Socialist Federal Republic of Yugoslavia)
	8	Josip Gjergja	22 – 24 November 1937	1.76 m (5 ft 9 in)	Zadar	(Socialist Federal Republic of Yugoslavia)
	9	Slobodan Gordić	22 – 28 September 1937	1.92 m (6 ft 4 in)	OKK Beograd	(Socialist Federal Republic of Yugoslavia)
PG	10	Ivo Daneu	22 – 6 October 1937	1.91 m (6 ft 3 in)	AŠK Olimpija	(Socialist Federal Republic of Yugoslavia)
C	11	Zvonko Petričević	20 – 26 July 1940	2.10 m (6 ft 11 in)	Mladost Zagreb	(Socialist Federal Republic of Yugoslavia)
SG	12	Sreten Dragojlović	22 – 6 May 1938	1.91 m (6 ft 3 in)	Crvena zvezda	(Socialist Federal Republic of Yugoslavia)
C	13	Radovan Radović	24 – 19 January 1936	1.87 m (6 ft 2 in)	Partizan	(Socialist Federal Republic of Yugoslavia)
PF	14	Nemanja Đurić	24 – 18 June 1936	1.95 m (6 ft 5 in)	Radnički Belgrade	(Socialist Federal Republic of Yugoslavia)

Head coach

- (Socialist Federal Republic of Yugoslavia) Aleksandar Nikolić

Assistant coach(es)

- (Socialist Federal Republic of Yugoslavia) Ranko Žeravica

Legend

- Club – describes last
  club before the tournament
- Age – describes age
  on 26 August 1960

== Group C ==
=== Brazil ===
The following players represented Brazil:

- Moses Blass
- Waldemar Blatskauskas
- Algodão
- Rosa Branca
- Mosquito
- Boccardo
- Wlamir Marques
- Amaury
- Fernando Brobró
- Sucar
- Jatyr
- Edson Bispo

=== Mexico ===
The following players represented Mexico:

- Alberto Almanza
- Armando Herrera
- Carlos Quintanar
- César Herrera
- Eulalio Avila
- Guillermo Torres
- Guillermo Wagner
- Héctor Aizpuro
- Ignacio Chavira
- José María Lozano
- Gayle Bluth
- Urbano Zea

=== Puerto Rico ===
The following players represented Puerto Rico:

- Ángel Cancel
- César Bocachica
- Evelio Droz
- John Moráles
- Johnny Rodríguez
- Toñín Casillas
- José Santori
- Juan Vicéns
- Juan Ramón Báez
- Rafael Valle
- José Cestero
- Teófilo Cruz

=== Soviet Union ===
The following players represented the Soviet Union:

- Yuri Korneev
- Guram Minashvili
- Valdis Muižnieks
- Cēzars Ozers
- Aleksandr Petrov
- Mikhail Semyonov
- Vladimer Ugrekhelidze
- Maigonis Valdmanis
- Jānis Krūmiņš
- Albert Valtin
- Gennadi Volnov
- Viktor Zubkov

== Group D ==
=== Philippines ===
The following players represented the Philippines:

- Alfonso Márquez
- Carlos Badion
- Constancio Ortíz
- Cristobal Ramas
- Ed Ocampo
- Edgardo Roque
- Eddie Pacheco
- Emilio Achacoso
- Kurt Bachmann
- Ciso Bernardo
- Roberto Yburan
- Gerry Cruz

=== Poland ===
The following players represented Poland:

- Andrzej Nartowski
- Andrzej Pstrokoński
- Bohdan Przywarski
- Dariusz Świerczewski
- Janusz Wichowski
- Jerzy Młynarczyk
- Jerzy Piskun
- Krzysztof Sitkowski
- Mieczysław Łopatka
- Ryszard Olszewski
- Tadeusz Pacuła
- Zbigniew Dregier

=== Spain ===
The following players represented Spain:

- Agustín Bertomeu
- Alfonso Martínez
- Emiliano Rodríguez
- Francisco Buscató
- Jesús Codina
- Joaquín Enseñat
- Jorge Guillén
- José Luis
- José Nora
- Juan Martos
- Miguel González
- Santiago Navarro

=== Uruguay ===
The following players represented Uruguay:

- Carlos Blixen
- Danilo Coito
- Edison Ciavattone
- Héctor Costa
- Manuel Gadea
- Milton Scaron
- Nelson Chelle
- Raúl Mera
- Sergio Matto
- Waldemar Rial
- Washington Poyet
- Adolfo Lubnicki
