= Uruguay at the 1964 Summer Olympics =

- IOC code: URU
- NOC: Uruguayan Olympic Committee

in Tokyo
- Competitors: 23 in 4 sports
- Medals Ranked 35th: Gold 0 Silver 0 Bronze 1 Total 1

Summer Olympics appearances (overview)
- 1924; 1928; 1932; 1936; 1948; 1952; 1956; 1960; 1964; 1968; 1972; 1976; 1980; 1984; 1988; 1992; 1996; 2000; 2004; 2008; 2012; 2016; 2020; 2024

Uruguay competed at the 1964 Summer Olympics in Tokyo, Japan. 23 competitors, all men, took part in 8 events in 4 sports.

== Medalists ==
=== Bronze ===
- Washington Rodriguez – Boxing, Men's Bantamweight (54 kg)

== Basketball ==
- Jorge Maya Dodera
- Manuel Gadea
- Luis García
- Luis Koster
- Ramiro de León
- Walter Márquez
- Edison Ciavattone
- Washington Poyet
- Sergio Pisano
- Alvaro Roca
- Waldemar Rial
- Julio Gómez

== Boxing ==
- Washington Rodríguez

== Cycling ==
Eight cyclists represented Uruguay in 1964.

Individual road race

- Ricardo Vázquez
- Francisco Pérez
- Vid Cencic
- Wilde Baridón

Team time trial

- Wilde Baridón
- Vid Cencic
- Francisco Pérez
- Ricardo Vázquez

1000m time trial

- Oscar Almada

Individual pursuit

- Rubén Etchebarne

Team pursuit

- Oscar Almada
- Rubén Etchebarne
- Elio Juárez
- Juan José Timón

== Rowing ==
- Mariano Caulín
- Gustavo Pérez
