= Duarte (name) =

Duarte is an Iberian given name and surname, being an alternative Portuguese form of the name Edward (another version is Eduardo).

== Given name ==
- Duarte Alves (born 1991), Portuguese politician
- Duarte Barbosa (c. 1480-1521), Portuguese writer and officer from Portuguese India
- Duarte Coelho Pereira (c. 1485–1554), nobleman, military leader, and colonial administrator in the Portuguese colony of Brazil
- Duarte de Menezes (1488-1539), Portuguese nobleman and colonial officer
- Duarte de Menezes, 3rd Count of Viana (1414-1464), Portuguese nobleman and military figure
- Duarte Brandão (1440-1508), the Governor of Guernsey, a knight, adventurer, ship commander and the godson and protégé of King Edward IV of England
- Duarte Nuno, Duke of Braganza (1907–1976), former claimant to the Portuguese throne
- Duarte Pio, Duke of Braganza (born 1945), current claimant to the Portuguese throne, Duarte Nuno's eldest son
- Duarte, Duke of Guimarães (1515–1540), the sixth son of King Manuel I of Portugal and his wife Maria of Aragon
- Duarte, Duke of Guimarães (1541–1576), son of Duarte of Portugal, 4th Duke of Guimarães and his wife, Isabel of Braganza
- Duarte Fernandes (16th century), Portuguese diplomat, explorer, and was the first European to establish diplomatic relations with Thailand,
- Duarte I, 4th Duke of Guimarães (1515–1540), Infante of Portugal
- Duarte II, 5th Duke of Guimarães (1541–1576), Infante of Portugal
- Edward, Duke of Guimarães (disambiguation), several people
- Edward, King of Portugal (Portuguese Duarte I), King of Portugal, 1433–1438
- Duarte Cordeiro (born 1979), Portuguese economist and politician
- Duarte Lobo (c. 1565-1646), Portuguese composer of the late Renaissance and early Baroque

== Surname ==
- Abílio Augusto Monteiro Duarte (1931–1996), Cape Verdean nationalist and early political leader in the independence era
- Adriano Belmiro Duarte Nicolau, best known by his nickname Yano, Angolan footballer
- Adriano Duarte Mansur da Silva (born 1980), known as Adriano Duarte, Brazilian football defender
- Ana Clara Reis Duarte (born 1989), Brazilian tennis player
- Andrés Duarte Villamayor (born 1972), Paraguayan footballer
- Anselmo Duarte (1920–2009), Brazilian actor, screenwriter and film director
- António Dinis Duarte (born 1967), Cape Verdean former footballer
- Arsénio Trindade Duarte (1925–1986), simply known as Arsénio, Portuguese footballer
- Arthur Duarte (1895–1982), Portuguese actor, screenwriter, production designer and film director
- Bela Duarte, artist from Cape Verde
- Belfort Duarte (1883–1918), Brazilian football central defender
- Bruno Duarte da Silva (born 1996), known as Bruno Duarte or simply Bruno, Brazilian footballer
- Carlos Duarte (footballer) (1933–2022), Portuguese footballer
- Carlos Duarte, Venezuelan composer and pianist
- Carlos Duarte Costa (1888–1961), Brazilian Catholic bishop
- Carolina Duarte (born 1990), track and field athlete from Portugal
- Celso Duarte (born 1974), Paraguayan harp and Mexican jarocho harp, arranger and singer
- César Horacio Duarte Jáquez (born 1963), Mexican politician, member of the Institutional Revolutionary Party
- César Gonçalves de Brito Duarte (born 1964), known as Brito, Portuguese footballer
- Chris Duarte (basketball) (born 1997), Canadian basketball player
- Chris Duarte (musician) (born 1963), American guitarist, singer, and songwriter
- Cláudio Duarte (born 1950), Brazilian footballer and coach
- Daniel Duarte (disambiguation), several people
- David de Duarte Macedo (born 1995), Brazilian professional footballer
- Débora Duarte (born 1950), Brazilian actress
- Dénis Paulo Duarte (born 1994), Portuguese footballer
- Deroy Duarte (born 1999), Dutch football player
- Diego Duarte (footballer, born 2006), Luxembourgian footballer
- Domingos Duarte (born 1995), Portuguese professional footballer
- Duarte Jorge Gomes Duarte (born 1987), also known as Duarte Duarte, Portuguese professional footballer
- Duarte de Freitas do Amaral, GCIH, ComC KCSG (1909–1979), Portuguese politician
- Elvira Lacy Duarte Cardoso (1937–2015), Uruguayan visual artist
- Enrique Duarte (born 1938), Peruvian basketball player
- Enriqueta Duarte (1929–2025), Argentine swimmer
- Eugenio Duarte, Cape Verdean ordained minister and 37th General Superintendent in the Church of the Nazarene
- Eva Duarte de Perón (1919-1952), the wife of Argentine President Juan Perón (1895–1974) and First Lady of Argentina from 1946 until her death in 1952
- F. J. Duarte (born c. 1954), American laser physicist
- Fábio Alexandre Duarte Felício (born 1982), Portuguese former footballer
- Fábio Miguel Silva Duarte (born 1998), Portuguese professional footballer
- Fabio Andrés Duarte Arevalo (born 1986), Colombian track and road cyclist
- Félix Ramos y Duarte (1848–1924), Cuban educator and writer
- Frederico Duarte (born 1999), Portuguese professional footballer
- Francisca Duarte (1595–1640), Portuguese singer
- Francisco Ayala y García-Duarte (1906-2009), Spanish writer, the last representative of the Generation of '27
- Francisco Lisvaldo Daniel Duarte (born 1990), also known as Esquerdinha, Brazilian footballer
- Francisco Miguel Duarte, also known as Chico Sapateiro (1907–1988), Portuguese writer and a regional leader
- Gabriela Duarte Franco (born 1974), Brazilian actress
- Gilles Duarte (born 1972), French rapper and actor
- Gisela Duarte Casas (born 1977), Peruvian volleyball player
- Gonçalo Duarte Amaral Sousa (born 1998), Portuguese professional footballer
- Henry Duarte Molina (born 1958), Costa Rican football coach
- Hugo José Duarte (born 1964), Brazilian football goalkeeper
- Hugo Duarte Sousa Luz (born 1982), Portuguese professional footballer
- Humberto Duarte Mauro (1897–1983), Brazilian film director
- Javier Duarte de Ochoa (born 1973), Mexican politician (affiliated with the Institutional Revolutionary Party)
- Jessica María Duarte Volweider (born 1992), Venezuelan model and beauty pageant titleholder
- Jessie Duarte, South African politician
- Jesús Gámez Duarte (born 1985), Spanish professional footballer
- João Alexandre Duarte Ferreira Fernandes (born 1979), known as Neca, Portuguese footballer
- João Cidade Duarte (1495-1550), also known as John of God, Portuguese soldier and Roman Catholic saint
- João Duarte Pereira (born 1990), Portuguese professional footballer
- Joe Duarte (born 1983), American professional mixed martial artist
- John-Paul Duarte (born 1986), Gibraltarian footballer
- John William Duarte (1919–2004), British composer, guitarist and writer
- José Duarte (disambiguation), several people
- José Napoleón Duarte Fuentes (1925–1990), Salvadoran politician who served as President of El Salvador from 1984 to 1989
- Julián Duarte (born 1994), Mexican male volleyball player
- Juan Maldondo Duarte (born 1982), Brazilian footballer
- Juan Pablo Duarte, founding father of the Dominican Republic
- Júlio Duarte Langa (born 1927), Roman Catholic Church bishop
- Karen Emilia Castiblanco Duarte (born 1988), Colombian tennis player
- Laros Duarte (born 1997), Dutch professional football player
- Lacy Duarte (1937–2015), Uruguayan artist
- Lerin Duarte (born 1990), Dutch professional footballer
- Leandra Duarte (born 1995), Brazilian influencer
- Leonardo Campos Duarte da Silva (born 1996), known as Léo Duarte, Brazilian professional footballer
- León Duarte, (1928-1976), Uruguayan trade unionist and anarchist
- Leonel Duarte Plat (born 1987), Cuban footballer
- Leonora Duarte (1610 – 1678?), Flemish composer and musician
- Lima Duarte (born Ariclenes Venâncio Martins; 1930), Brazilian actor
- Luis Duarte (1941–2017), Peruvian basketball player
- Luiz Duarte da Rocha (born 1956), Brazilian playwright and director, and singer/songwriter
- Manuel Alegre Duarte (born 1936), Portuguese poet and politician
- Manuel Almeida Duarte (1945–2022), Portuguese footballer
- Marcelo Nuno Duarte Rebelo de Sousa ComSE, GCIH (born 1948), Portuguese politician, academic and journalist serving as the 20th President of Portugal, since 9 March 2016
- María Gloria Penayo de Duarte (née Solaeche, born 1962), the First Lady of Paraguay as the wife of Nicanor Duarte Frutos, President of Paraguay from 2003–2008
- Mariana Duarte (born 1996), Brazilian female water polo player
- Marcos Rogério Oliveira Duarte, known as Marcos Rogério or Rogério (born 1985), Brazilian footballer
- Mario Lucio Duarte Costa (born 1980), known as Aranha, Brazilian football goalkeeper
- Matias Duarte, Chilean computer interface designer for (Android), Vice President of Design at Google
- Mauricio Duarte Barajas (born 1992), Colombian professional footballer
- Nancy Duarte, American writer, speaker and CEO
- Néstor Duarte Carassa (born 1990), Peruvian footballer
- Nicanor Duarte Frutos, former President of Paraguay, 2003–2008
- Norma Duarte (born 1998), Mexican footballer
- Óscar Duarte (disambiguation), several people
- Osmay Acosta Méndez Duarte (born 1985), Cuban amateur boxer
- Óscar Esaú Duarte Gaitán (born 1989), Costa Rican professional footballer
- Pedro Miguel Mimoso Duarte (born 1978), Portuguese footballer
- Rafael Duarte Lima (born 1983), Brazilian boxer
- Raúl Fragoso Ferreira Duarte (born 1963), Angolan basketball coach
- Raúl Ricardo Duarte Barrios (born 1969), Paraguayan footballer and current manager
- Regina Blois Duarte (born 1947), Brazilian actress
- Ricardo André Duarte Pires (born 1982), Portuguese footballer
- Robert Jack Duarte Wallace (born 1986), Mexican actor and singer
- Roberto Duarte Silva, Cape Verdian chemist
- Rui Duarte (footballer, born 1980), Portuguese professional footballer
- Rui Pedro Viegas Silva Gomes Duarte (born 1978), Portuguese professional footballer
- Sérgio de Queiroz Duarte (1934-2024), Brazilian career diplomat
- Sérgio Valle Duarte, Brazilian multimedia artist and photographer
- Sophie Duarte (born 1981), French runner
- Stella Pope Duarte, Latina American novelist
- Teófilo Duarte (1898–1958), Portuguese colonial administrator
- Thaís Duarte Guedes (born 1993), Brazilian footballer
- Thomas James Duarte (born 1995), American football tight
- Valdomiro Duarte de Macedo (born 1979), Brazilian footballer
- Vera Valentina Benrós de Melo Duarte Lobo de Pina (born 1952), also known as Vera Duarte Martins, Cape Verdean human rights activist
- Vinicius Duarte (born 1996), Brazilian footballer
- John Duarte (born 1966), American politician and U.S. Representative

== Fictional characters ==
- Jude Duarte, from Holly Black's The Folk of the Air trilogy, including The Cruel Prince
- Duarte Pinto and his son Duarte "Cory" Pinto Jr., from Meg Wolitzer's The Female Persuasion
- Duarte, chief detective in the Portuguese police comedy TV series Duarte e Companhia
- Inés Duarte, title character of the Venezuelan telenovela Inés Duarte, secretaria
- Pascual Duarte, title character of Camilo José Cela's novel The Family of Pascual Duarte
- Winston Duarte, from James S. A. Corey's novel series The Expanse
