= Canada at the 1964 Summer Olympics =

- IOC code: CAN
- NOC: Canadian Olympic Committee

in Tokyo
- Competitors: 115 in 16 sports
- Flag bearer: Gilmour Boa
- Medals Ranked 22nd: Gold 1 Silver 2 Bronze 1 Total 4

Summer Olympics appearances (overview)
- 1900; 1904; 1908; 1912; 1920; 1924; 1928; 1932; 1936; 1948; 1952; 1956; 1960; 1964; 1968; 1972; 1976; 1980; 1984; 1988; 1992; 1996; 2000; 2004; 2008; 2012; 2016; 2020; 2024

Other related appearances
- 1906 Intercalated Games

Canada competed at the 1964 Summer Olympics in Tokyo, Japan. 115 competitors, 95 men and 20 women, took part in 92 events in 16 sports.

== Medallists ==
=== Gold ===
- Roger Jackson and George Hungerford – Rowing, men's coxless pair

=== Silver ===
- Bill Crothers – Athletics, men's 800 m
- Doug Rogers – Judo, men's over 80 kg

=== Bronze ===
- Harry Jerome – Athletics, men's 100 m

Harry Jerome's 100 metre bronze medal win at the Tokyo 1964 Summer Olympics is captured in the documentary film Tokyo Olympiad (1965) directed by Kon Ichikawa. Slow motion close-up footage of Jerome (along with other athletes) preparing for the race begins at the 26 minute mark and then the race is shown in its entirety at full speed.

== Athletics ==
Men's Competition

100 metres

- Harry Jerome
  - Heat – 10.5
  - Second round – 10.3
  - Semi-final – 10.3
  - Final – 10.2 (→ Bronze medal)

200 metres

- Harry Jerome
  - Heat – 20.9
  - Second round – 21.2
  - Semi-final – 21.0
  - Final – 20.8 (→ 4th place)

400 metres

- Bill Crothers
  - Heat – 46.8
  - Second round – 46.7
  - Semi-final – 46.9 (→ did not advance)

800 metres

- Bill Crothers
  - Heat – 1:49.3
  - Semi-final – 1:47.3
  - Final – 1:45.6 (→ Silver medal)
- Don Bertoia
  - Heat – 1:52.2 (→ did not advance)

1.500 metres

- Ergas Leps
  - Heat – 3:46.4
  - Semi-final – 3:51.2 (→ did not advance)

5.000 metres

- Bruce Kidd
  - Heat – 14:21.8 (→ did not advance)

10.000 metres

- Bruce Kidd
  - Final – 30:56.4 (→ 26th place)

110 m hurdles

- Cliff Nuttall
  - Heat – 14.8 (→ did not advance)

400 m hurdles

- Bill Gairdner
  - Heat – 53.8 (→ did not advance)

20 km walk

- Alexander Oakley
  - Final – did not finish (→ no ranking)

50 km walk

- Alexander Oakley
  - Final – 4:27:24.6 (→ 15th place)

Pole Vault

- Gerry Moro
  - Final – 4m70 (→ 10th place)

Decathlon

- Bill Gairdner
  - Total – 7147 points (→ 11th place)
- Gerry Moro
  - Total – 6716 points (→ 11th place)

== Basketball ==
Men's team competition

- Preliminary round
  - Canada – Soviet Union 52-87
  - Canada – Hungary 59-70
  - Canada – Japan 37-58
  - Canada – Italy 54-66
  - Canada – Mexico 68-78
  - Canada – Puerto Rico 69-88
  - Canada – Poland 69-74
- Classification match
  - Canada – Peru 82-81
- Classification match
  - Canada – Hungary 65-68 → 14th place
- Team roster
  - Walter Birtles
  - John Dacyshyn
  - Rolly Goldring
  - Keith Hartley
  - Barry Howson
  - Fred Ingaldson
  - James Maguire
  - John McKibbon
  - Warren Reynolds
  - Ruby Richman
  - Joseph Stulac
  - George Stulac

== Boxing ==
Men's flyweight (51 kg)

- John Henry
  - First round – lost to Constantin Ciuca (ROM), DSQ

Men's lightweight (60 kg)

- Roger Palmer
  - First round – defeated Gabriel Achy Assi (IVC), 3:2
  - Second round – lost to Stoyan Pilichev (BUL), 0:5

Men's Light-Welterweight (63½ kg)

- Harvey Reti
  - First round – bye
  - Second round – lost to István Toth (HUN), 2:3

Men's welterweight (67 kg)

- Frederick Desrosiers
  - First round – lost to Silvano Bertini (ITA), DSQ

== Diving ==
Men

Athlete	Event	Preliminary		Final			
Athlete	Event	Points	Rank	Points	Rank	Total	Rank
Thomas Dinsley	3 m springboard	83.02	18	Did not advance			
Thomas Dinsley	10 m platform	83.22	24	Did not advance			

Women

Athlete	Event	Preliminary		Final			
Athlete	Event	Points	Rank	Points	Rank	Total	Rank
Carol Ann Morrow	3 m springboard	64.07	19	Did not advance			
Judy Stewart	3 m springboard	82.39	11	Did not advance			
Carol Ann Morrow	10 m platform	47.62	10 Q	38.52	11	86.14	11
Judy Stewart	10 m platform	36.47	23	Did not advance			

== Fencing ==
Three fencers, two men and one woman, represented Canada in 1964.

Men's foil

- John Andru
- Robert Foxcroft

Men's épée

- John Andru
- Robert Foxcroft

Men's sabre

- John Andru
- Robert Foxcroft

Women's foil

- Pacita Weidel

== Hockey ==
Men's team competition

- Preliminary round
  - Canada – Germany 1-5
  - Canada – Netherlands 0-5
  - Canada – Hong Kong 2-1
  - Canada – Spain 0-3
  - Canada – Belgium 1-5
  - Canada – India 0-3
  - Canada – Malaysia 2-3 → 14th place
- Team roster
  - Ronald Aldridge
  - Derrick Anderson
  - Anthony Boyd
  - Peter Buckland
  - Richard Chopping
  - Gerd Heidinger
  - Ian Johnston
  - Harry Preston
  - Alan Raphael
  - Gerard Ronan
  - Patrick Ruttle
  - Peter Vander Pyl
  - Victor Warren
  - Lee Wright
  - Andrew Yeoman
  - John Young

== Shooting ==
Six shooters represented Canada in 1964.

25 m pistol

- William Hare
- Garfield McMahon

50 m pistol

- Garfield McMahon
- William Hare

50 m rifle, three positions

- George Marsh
- Gil Boa

50 m rifle, prone

- Gil Boa
- George Marsh

Trap

- Floyd Nattrass
- Harry Willsie

== Swimming ==
Men

Athlete	Event	Heat		Semifinal		Final	
Athlete	Event	Time	Rank	Time	Rank	Time	Rank
Sandy Gilchrist	100 m freestyle	55.8	=18 Q	56.4	=21	Did not advance	
Ralph Hutton	100 m freestyle	57.7	=47	Did not advance			
Daniel Sherry	100 m freestyle	55.2	=7 Q	55.5	=12	Did not advance	
Sandy Gilchrist	400 m freestyle	4:24.2	11	—N/a		Did not advance	
Ralph Hutton	400 m freestyle	4:29.4	21	—N/a		Did not advance	
Ron Jacks	400 m freestyle	4:29.3	20	—N/a		Did not advance	
Sandy Gilchrist	1500 m freestyle	17:42.0	12	—N/a		Did not advance	
Ralph Hutton	200 m backstroke	2:17.8	=10 Q	2:15.8	7 Q	2:15.9	7
Ron Jacks	200 m backstroke	2:21.3	22	Did not advance			
Ralph Hutton	200 m butterfly	2:20.8	24	Did not advance			
Daniel Sherry	200 m butterfly	2:12.9	6 Q	2:12.9	8 Q	2:14.6	8
Sandy Gilchrist	400 m individual medley	4:58.3	3 Q	—N/a		4:57.6	5
Ralph Hutton	400 m individual medley	5:06.2	11	—N/a		Did not advance	
Daniel Sherry; Ralph Hutton; Ron Jacks; Sandy Gilchrist	4 × 100 m freestyle relay	3:49.7	11	—N/a		Did not advance	
Ron Jacks; Ralph Hutton; Daniel Sherry; Sandy Gilchrist	4 × 200 m freestyle relay	8:22.2	9	—N/a		Did not advance	
Ralph Hutton; Sandy Gilchrist; Daniel Sherry; Ron Jacks	4 × 100 m medley relay	4:15.5	10	—N/a		Did not advance	

Women

Athlete	Event	Heat		Semifinal		Final	
Athlete	Event	Time	Rank	Time	Rank	Time	Rank
Helen Kennedy	100 m freestyle	1:04.2	=20	Did not advance			
Marion Lay	100 m freestyle	1:02.1	3 Q	1:02.2	3 Q	1:02.2	5
Mary Beth Stewart	100 m freestyle	1:05.1	28	Did not advance			
Barbara Hounsell	400 m freestyle	5:04.9	18	—N/a		Did not advance	
Jane Hughes	400 m freestyle	4:54.8	8 Q	—N/a		4:50.9	5
Patty Thompson	400 m freestyle	5:06.7	23	—N/a		Did not advance	
Helen Kennedy	100 m backstroke	1:12.5	22	—N/a		Did not advance	
Eileen Weir	100 m backstroke	1:09.7	4 Q	—N/a		1:09.8	7
Marianne Humeniuk	100 m butterfly	1:09.5	9 Q	1:09.2	9	Did not advance	
Helen Kennedy	100 m butterfly	1:11.2	=18	Did not advance			
Mary Beth Stewart	100 m butterfly	1:09.9	10 Q	1:08.6	7 Q	1:10.0	8
Barbara Hounsell	400 m individual medley	5:38.4	9	—N/a		Did not advance	
Helen Kennedy	400 m individual medley	5:49.9	17	—N/a		Did not advance	
Mary Beth Stewart; Patty Thompson; Helen Kennedy; Marion Lay	4 × 100 m freestyle relay	4:14.9	=6 Q	—N/a		4:15.9	7
Eileen Weir; Marion Lay; Mary Beth Stewart; Helen Kennedy	4 × 100 m medley relay	4:46.6	7 Q	—N/a		4:49.9	6
