= Fujie =

Fujie (written: 藤江) is a Japanese surname. Notable people with the surname include:

- Hitoshi Fujie (藤江 均, born 1986), Japanese baseball player
- Keisuke Fujie (藤江 恵輔, 1885–1969), Japanese general
- Masakatsu G. Fujie (藤江 正克, born 1945), Japanese scientist
- Reina Fujie (藤江 れいな, born 1994), Japanese idol
- Seiji Fujie (藤江 精二, born 1941), Japanese basketball player
- Tatsunori Fujie (藤江 建典, born 1987), Japanese basketball player

Fujie (written: 冨士枝) is also a feminine Japanese given name. Notable people with the name include:

- Fujie Eguchi (江口 冨士枝, 1932–2021), Japanese table tennis player
- Fujie Sakamoto (坂本 フジヱ, 1924–2021), Japanese nurse and midwife
