= Vaqueros de Bayamón =

- Nickname: "Cowboys"
- Leagues: Baloncesto Superior Nacional
- Founded: 1930; 96 years ago
- History: Vaqueros de Bayamón (1930–present)
- Arena: Ruben Rodriguez Coliseum
- Capacity: 12,000
- Location: Bayamón, Puerto Rico
- Team colors: Cowboy blue, azure blue, gold, white
- Head coach: Christian Dalmau
- Ownership: Eric Duars
- Championships: 18 (1933, 1935, 1967, 1969, 1971, 1972, 1973, 1974, 1975, 1981, 1988, 1995, 1996, 2009, 2020, 2022, 2025, 2026)
- Retired numbers: 8 (4, 5, 9, 15, 16, 17, 17, 54)
Home	Away	Third

The Vaqueros de Bayamón (Spanish: [baˈkeɾos ðe βaʝaˈmon]) are a professional basketball team based in Bayamón, Puerto Rico, actively participating in the Baloncesto Superior Nacional (BSN). Founded in 1930, the team has been a significant participant in the development of basketball in Puerto Rico. They stage their home games at the Rubén Rodríguez Coliseum. As of 2026, the Vaqueros have secured a total of 18 BSN championships, the most in the League's history. The team also holds a league record for winning 29 games during their 1993 season. The Vaqueros de Bayamón's contributions to the BSN have been instrumental in Puerto Rico's representation in the global basketball scene.

== Franchise history ==
(above) Vaqueros team's championship poster (1967)

Established in 1930, the Vaqueros de Bayamon—initially known as Bayamon—quickly made their mark in the amateur Baloncesto Nacional league, now the Baloncesto Superior Nacional (BSN). Under the guidance of Professional Head Coach Onofre Carballeira, they clinched their first league championships in 1933 and 1935. However, the team's momentum was interrupted in the 1940s due to WWII, and their participation only resumed in 1954.

With the return of competition, the team underwent a rebranding as the Azules de Bayamón (lit. "Bayamon Blues"), led by Coach Félix Joglar. Despite the renewed effort, the team did not secure any titles that season.

The team entered its modern era shortly after, rebranding as Los Vaqueros de Bayamon in 1955, the new name was inspired by their new sponsor, Espasas Dairy Company. This era marked a significant comeback for the team.

During this time, the Vaqueros roster boasted remarkable talents. Evelio "El Potro" Droz, who joined in 1957, quickly became a star, leading the league in scoring with 407 points in 1959, and representing Puerto Rico in the Central American and Caribbean Games in Venezuela. Martin Ansa, who became one of the leading scorers in Puerto Rican basketball, joined the team in 1960 and won the scoring title with 405 points.

In 1967, the Vaqueros secured a championship win against the Ponce team, their third championship and their first in 32 years. This victory, partially attributed to the sportsmanship and skills of players like Julio Toro, marked the beginning of a resurgence for the Vaqueros. They consolidated this newfound reputation with another championship in 1969.

The 1970s became a golden era for the Vaqueros, with the team winning five consecutive championships from 1971 to 1975. Under the influence of notable coaches such as Roy Rubbins, Art Loche, Lou Rossini, Fufi Santori, Tom Nissalke, and Del Harris, the Vaqueros continued to excel. Fufi Santori, a figure renowned both as a player and coach, played a pivotal role during this period, as did exceptional defensive player Alberto Samot.

1974's Season poster featuring the Vaqueros (Finals)

As the 1980s arrived, competition in the BSN intensified, particularly against the Guaynabo Mets team, led by Mario Morales and Federico Lopez. The Vaqueros emerged victorious in the final series against Guaynabo in 1981, adding another championship to their collection.

The team's fanbase saw considerable growth in the 1980s and 1990s. In 1988, under the guidance of Robert Corn, the Vaqueros clinched yet another championship against the Indios de Canovanas. They secured further championships in 1995 and 1996 against the Ponce Lions, with Flor Melendez serving as head coach.

The late 1990s and the early 2000s, however, proved to be a challenging period for the Vaqueros. From 1999 to 2008, the team often struggled to advance beyond the semifinals, only making it to the finals in 2005, where they were defeated by the Arecibo Captains. This period marked a decline in the franchise's performance, prestige, and fanbase.

The team's fortunes turned in 2009 when new management sought to invest heavily in the franchise recruiting talents like: Christian Dalmau, Orlando 'Guayacan' Santiago, Carmelo Lee, Danny Santiago and Olumide Oyedeji; that year they won a championship against Quebradillas, effectively ending a decade of stagnation. Although the 2010s saw a competitive yet unsuccessful championship bid, marking their first title-less decade since the 1950s, the Vaqueros found their stride again in the next decade. Under the leadership of head coach Nelson Colón, the team won championships in 2020 (a tournament season shortened due to the COVID-19 pandemic) and 2022, bringing their total league titles to sixteen. As a result, they surpassed the San German Athletics in the league's historical standings. As of now, the Vaqueros de Bayamon are the reigning champions in the BSN league, winning multiple league titles during the current decade.

In January 2025, the Vaqueros signed three-time NBA champion JaVale McGee and Danilo Gallinari. In March 2025, the team also signed Chris Duarte a former NBA All-Rookie Second Team selection. On August 12, 2025, they won their 17th championship.

The Vaqueros entered the 2026 season without their three import-player slots as a sanction for exceeding the league’s salary cap during the previous season. After playing their first three games without imports, Bayamón regained the ability to add foreign players to its roster. Throughout the season, the Vaqueros utilized several imports, including Australian players Xavier Cooks and Jaylin Galloway, former NBA player Jae Crowder, and 7 ft 5 in (2.26 m) center Jamarion Sharp. The team ultimately settled on a group featuring Dominican rising star Jassel Pérez, two-time NBA champion Damian Jones, and Chris McCullough. Bayamón went on to win its second consecutive BSN championship, defeating the Santeros de Aguada in seven games in the 2026 BSN Finals. Renaldo Balkman was named Finals MVP.

== Team's Identity ==
=== Apparel and Branding ===
The team has showcased various colors in their uniforms throughout their history. However, the colors most closely associated with the franchise are blue, white, and gold, reflecting the colors found in the municipality's flag. In earlier decades, the team also wore red uniforms. Occasionally, the team revives the red colors for special "retro" nights, evoking nostalgia. In 2022, the Vaqueros won that season's championship while wearing red uniforms against the Atléticos de San Germán. The team's uniform choices have played a significant role in its branding and the color schemes of their home court.

Currently, the team has two official sets of uniforms: a white with blue trim and stripes Home uniform and blue with white trim Visitor uniform. Both sets share a near-identical design, featuring the team's name prominently displayed on the front above the number. On the back, the player's last name is positioned below the number, accompanied by the Vaqueros' logo.

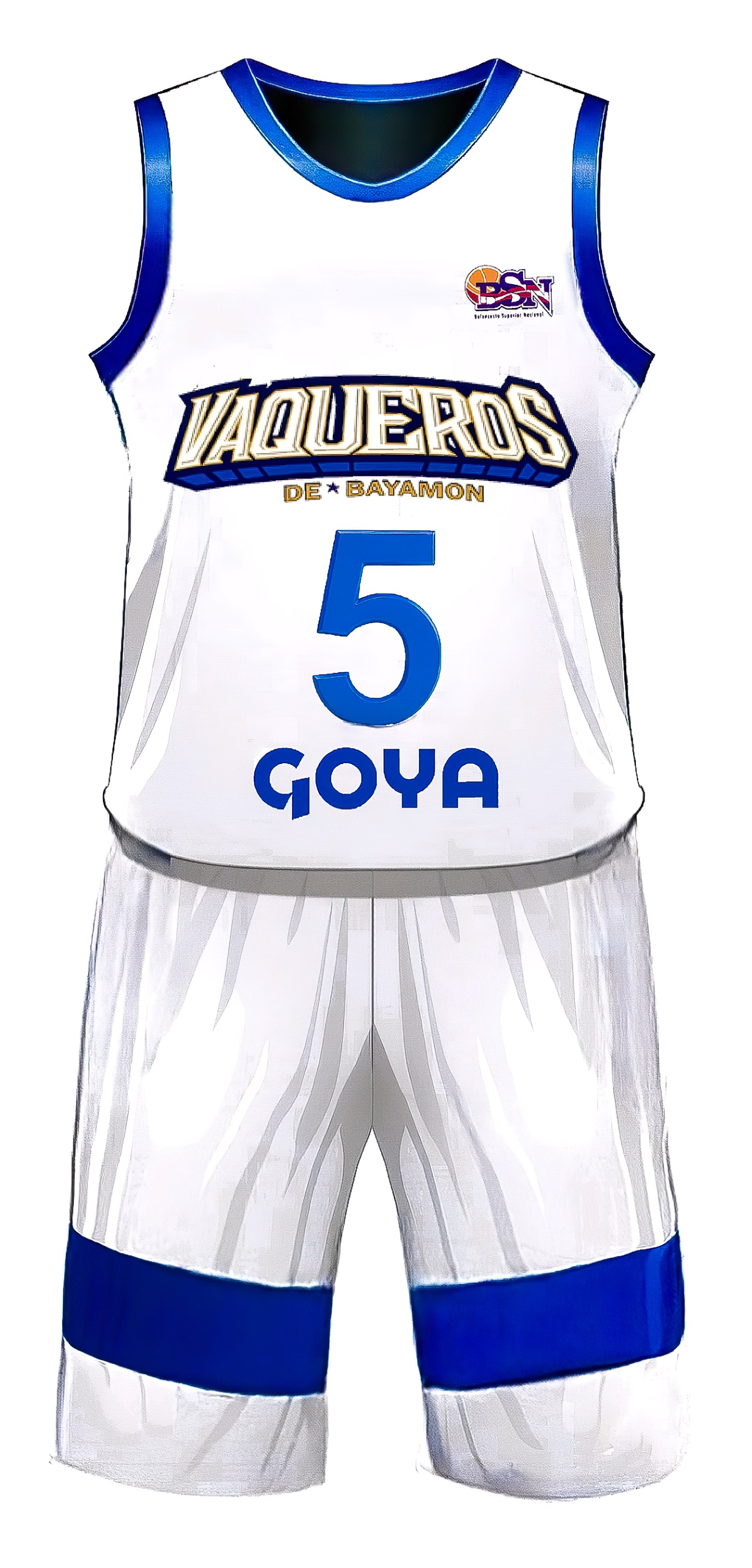
Home Uniform

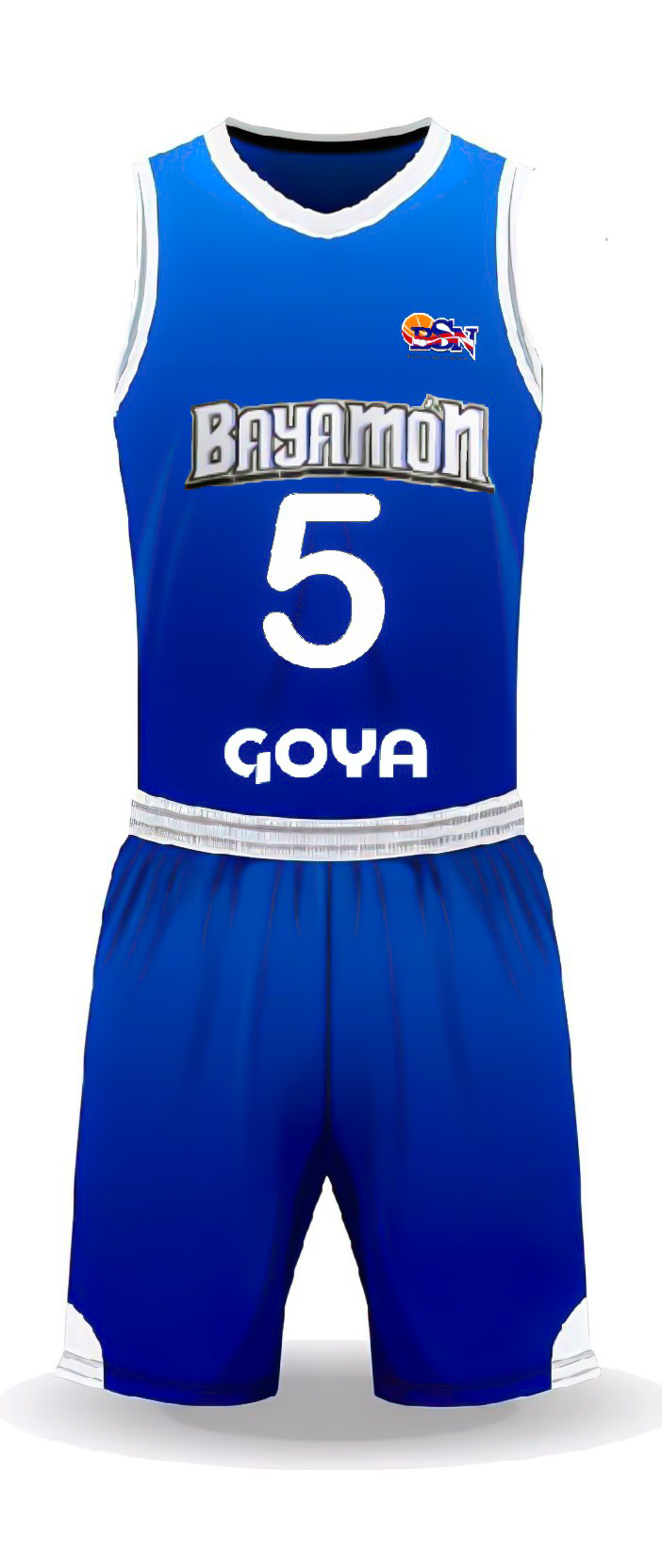
Visitor Uniform

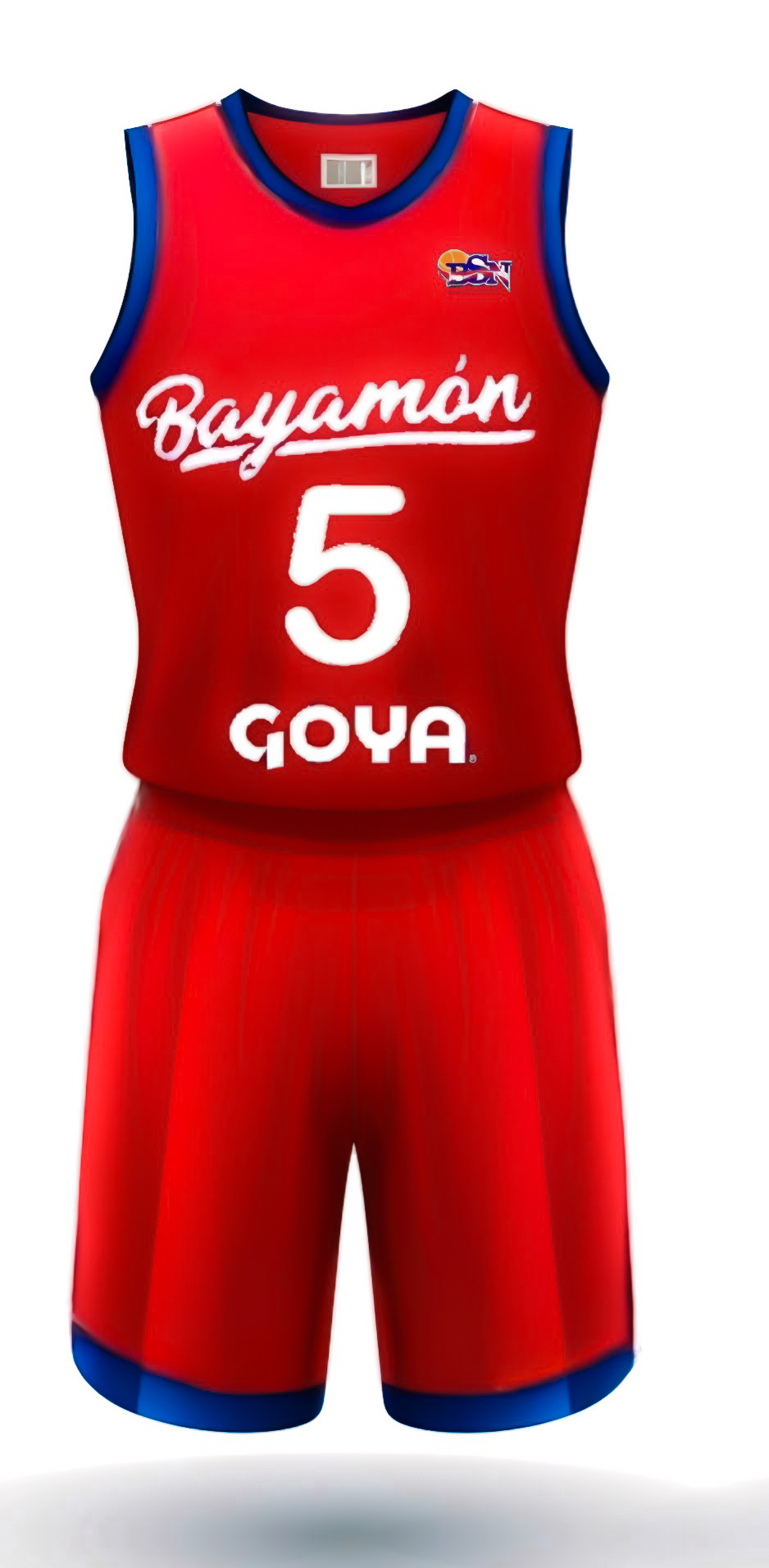
Alternate "Retro" nostalgia Uniform occasionally used for both Home and Visitor matches.

Current logo

Previously used logo

Previously used logo

Previously used logo

=== Arena ===
The Vaqueros de Bayamón play their home games at the Rubén Rodríguez Coliseum, an arena inaugurated in 1988 and named after the team's former player. As Puerto Rico's third-largest indoor sports venue, the coliseum can comfortably host up to 12,000 fans, though it has been known to accommodate nearly 16,000 spectators during the team's finals.

The seating arrangement within the coliseum is divided into three sections:

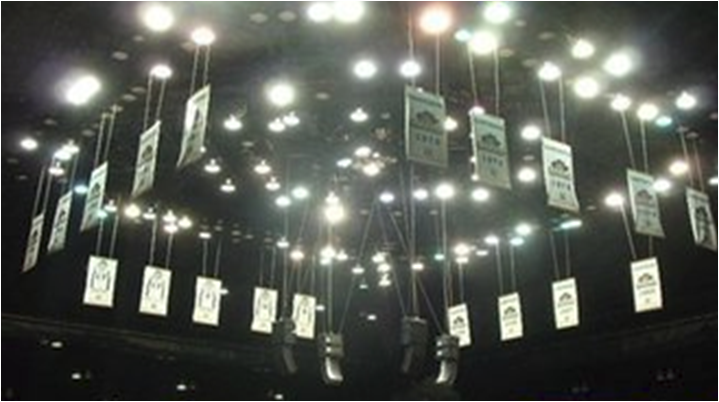
Championship flags displayed in the coliseum

- Box area (Palco) – blue section
- Middle area (Preferencia) – yellow section
- General area – orange section

Prior to the opening of the Rubén Rodriguez Coliseum in the late 1980s and early 1990s, the Vaqueros played their home games at the Cancha José "Pepín" Cestero, a smaller indoor court also situated in Bayamón.

=== Fan base ===
he Vaqueros experienced a slight decrease in attendance from 2000 to 2008, a period marked by limited success and no championships. During the 1990s, the team's average fanbase was estimated at over 12,000. A revival of enthusiasm was evident in the 2009 season, when the team clinched their 14th championship and witnessed a surge in attendance, drawing an estimated 14,000 spectators to the final game, over 11,000 of whom were estimated to be Vaqueros fans.

In the 2014 regular season, their Arena averaged an attendance of 4,723 fans per game, placing them amongst the BSN's most supported teams.

Since 1982 the teams mascot has been Moncho Loubriel.

=== Rivalries ===
The Vaqueros de Bayamón have been involved in significant rivalries throughout their history, often facing off against certain teams in multiple finals. Notable rivalries include:

- The Ponce Lions: A fierce rivalry that emerged during the late 1960s and resurfaced in the mid-1990s, showcasing intense competition between the Vaqueros and the Lions.
- The Quebradillas Pirates: A rivalry spanning from the early 1970s to the late 1990s, and reignited in 2009 with the addition of a key player, Dalmau, to the Vaqueros' roster. This renewed rivalry has seen both teams reaching the finals on multiple occasions.
- Río Piedras: An intense matchup between the Vaqueros and Río Piedras, highlighted by their encounters in 1969 and 1971.
- Guaynabo Mets: An engaging rivalry that unfolded in the early 1980s, featuring captivating contests between the Vaqueros and the Guaynabo Mets.
- Capitanes de Arecibo: A notable rivalry that emerged in 2005, with subsequent encounters in 2010 and 2018, showcasing fierce competition between the Vaqueros and the Capitanes de Arecibo.
- Vega Baja: A rivalry rooted in the early years of the franchise, specifically from 1933 to 1934, when the Vaqueros faced off against Vega Baja in memorable battles.

=== Sponsors ===
Goya Foods has sponsored the Vaqueros de Bayamón for 37 seasons, providing financial support to the team.

== Players ==
=== Current roster ===
Vaqueros de Bayamón roster
Players
Coaches

Pos.	No.	Nat.	Name	Ht.	Wt.	Age
PF	20	(Puerto Rico)	Cintrón, Jordan	6 ft 8 in (2.03 m)	210 lb (95 kg)	28 – June 11, 1998
PG	22	(Puerto Rico)	Ezquerra, Javier	6 ft 1 in (1.85 m)	180 lb (82 kg)	24 – January 3, 2002
F/C	35	(Puerto Rico)	Hernández, Luis	6 ft 9 in (2.06 m)	225 lb (102 kg)	38 – July 16, 1988
SG	44	(Puerto Rico)	Mojica, Javier (C)	6 ft 3 in (1.91 m)	180 lb (82 kg)	42 – August 31, 1984
		(Puerto Rico)	Balkman, Renaldo
		(Puerto Rico)	Browne, Gary
		(Puerto Rico)	Palermo, Isaiah
		(Puerto Rico)	Thompson, Stevie

Head coach

- (Puerto Rico) Christian Dalmau

Assistant coach(es)

- (Puerto Rico)

Athletic trainer(s)

- (Puerto Rico)

Legend

- (C) Team captain
- (I) Import player
- Injured

- Roster
Updated: 10 November 2026

- Rights: Enrique Freeman

=== Depth chart ===
Pos.	Starting 5	Bench 1	Bench 2
C		Jordan Cintrón	Luis Hernández
PF			Marvin Mantilla
SF			Richell Janga
SG	Javier Mojica		Khary Mauras
PG		Javier Ezquerra	Neftalí Acevedo

== Notable players & retired numbers ==
Note: Flags indicate national team eligibility at FIBA-sanctioned events. Players may hold other non-FIBA nationalities not displayed.

Criteria

To appear in this section a player must have either:

- Set a club record or won an individual award while at the club
- Played at least one official international match for their national team at any time
- Played at least one official NBA match at any time.

- (Australia) Xavier Cooks
- (Dominican Republic) Chris Duarte
- (Dominican Republic) Francisco García
- (Italy) Danilo Gallinari
- (Nigeria) Olumide Oyedeji
- (Puerto Rico) - (Cuba) Ismael Romero
- (Puerto Rico) Renaldo Balkman
- (Puerto Rico) Gary Browne
- (Puerto Rico) Javier Mojica
- (Puerto Rico) Peter John Ramos
- (South Sudan) Wenyen Gabriel
- (Spain) Andy Panko
- (United States) Jae Crowder
- (United States) Damion Jones
- (United States) Chris McCullough
- (United States) JaVale McGee
- (United States) Jamarion Sharp
- (United States) Jabari Smith Sr.
- (United States) Robert Traylor
- (United States) Jacob Wiley
- (United States) Terrence Williams

=== Retired Numbers ===
- (Dominican Republic) 4 Franklin Western (2x BSN Champion)
- (Puerto Rico) 5 Evelio Droz (2x BSN Champion)
- (Puerto Rico) 9 Alberto Zamot (7x BSN Champion)
- (Puerto Rico) 15 Ruben Rodriguez (8x BSN Chamipion, MVP)
- (Puerto Rico) 16 Billy Baum (7x BSN Champion)
- (Puerto Rico) 17 Jerome Mincy (3x BSN Champion)
- (Puerto Rico) 17 Mariano Ortiz (8x BSN Champion)
- (United States) 54 Robert Traylor (Passed away while on the team)

== Rubén Rodríguez ==
Rubén Rodríguez, played 23 seasons for the Vaqueros de Bayamón, wearing the number 15 jersey throughout his career. His debut season was in 1969, and over the course of his career, he amassed a substantial total of 11,549 points and 6,178 rebounds across 631 games, setting several significant records in the process:

- Career Points: 11,549
- Season Points: 810 (1979)
- Single Game Points: 52 (1973)
- Career Rebounds: 6,178

Rodríguez's record for rebounds in a season stood from 1978 until 2008 when Lee Benson, another Vaqueros' player, surpassed it on May 3, 2008.

Throughout his career, Rodríguez remained loyal to the Vaqueros, leading them to nine national championship victories, including a streak of five consecutive wins from 1971 to 1975, as well as triumphs in 1967, 1969, 1981, and 1988. His contributions were recognized with the MVP award in 1979. The 1980 season, which marked the introduction of the three-point shot in the Puerto Rican tournament, saw Rodríguez adapt his game, scoring from behind the new three-point line.

The Vaqueros named their home venue after him, the Rubén Rodríguez Coliseum, which was inaugurated in 1988.

== Team records and achievements ==
=== League Titles ===
- With a total of 18, the team holds the record for the most BSN championships.

Season	Titleholder	Runner-up	Head coach
1933	Vaqueros de Bayamón	Atléticos de San Germán	Onofre Carballeira
1935	Vaqueros de Bayamón	Vega Baja	Onofre Carballeira
1967	Vaqueros de Bayamón	Leones de Ponce	Roy Rubbins and Fufi Santori
1969	Vaqueros de Bayamón	Río Piedras	Art Loche
1971	Vaqueros de Bayamón	Río Piedras	Art Loche
1972	Vaqueros de Bayamón	Piratas de Quebradillas	Tom Nissalke and Fufi Santori
1973	Vaqueros de Bayamón	Piratas de Quebradillas	Del Harris
1974	Vaqueros de Bayamón	San Juan	Del Harris
1975	Vaqueros de Bayamón	Piratas de Quebradillas	Del Harris
1981	Vaqueros de Bayamón	Mets de Guaynabo	Gene Bartow
1988	Vaqueros de Bayamón	Indios de Canóvanas	Robert Corn
1995	Vaqueros de Bayamón	Leones de Ponce	Flor Melendez
1996	Vaqueros de Bayamón	Leones de Ponce	Flor Melendez
2009	Vaqueros de Bayamón	Piratas de Quebradillas	Julio Toro
2020	Vaqueros de Bayamón	Piratas de Quebradillas	Nelson Colon
2022	Vaqueros de Bayamón	Atléticos de San Germán	Nelson Colon
2025	Vaqueros de Bayamón	Leones de Ponce	Cristhian Dalmau
2026	Vaqueros de Bayamón	Santeros de Aguada	Cristhian Dalmau

=== Other Records ===
The Vaqueros de Bayamon team holds several records in the BSN league:

- They are the only team to have won 5 consecutive championships. They achieved this in the years: 1971, 1972, 1973, 1974, and 1975.
- The team has also been runner-up nine times: 1930, 1934, 1970, 2001, 2002, 2005, 2010, 2015, and 2018.
- Bayamon has competed in the most seasons with 81.
- Secured a record of 29 victories in a single season (1993), and a record of 23 losses in one season (1992).
- The team achieved the league's all-time highest game score with 143 points against Fajardo (121 points) in 1978.
- The team also holds a record of 29 consecutive victories across two seasons.

Individual Records:

- Player Eddín Santiago made a record 16 assists in a single game (2004), while Michelo Dávila made 208 assists in the 1999 season.
- The record for most 3-pointers in a game is jointly held by Raymond Gausse (1992), Carmelo Travieso (2002), and Javier Mojica (2021), each scoring 9 3-pointers. Carmelo Travieso also made a record 101 3-pointers in the 2001 season.
- Carmelo Travieso scored a record 21 points in a single quarter in 2001.
