= John Morales =

John Morales may refer to:

- John Morales (meteorologist), American meteorologist
- John Moráles (born 1939), former Puerto Rican basketball player
- John Morales, American music producer member of Morales and Munzibai
