= Raúl Duarte =

Raúl Duarte may refer to:

- Raúl Duarte (footballer) (born 1969), Paraguayan football manager and player
- Raúl Duarte (basketball, born 1944), Peruvian basketball player
- Raúl Duarte (basketball, born 1963), Angolan basketball coach
