= Anthony Boyd =

Anthony Boyd may refer to:

- Anthony Todd Boyd, American executed criminal (d. 2025)
- Charles Anthony Boyd, American executed serial killer (1959–1999)
- Jerome Anthony Boyd, American football player (1961–2017)
- Terrence Anthony Boyd, American soccer player (b. 1991)
- Tony Boyd, Canadian field hockey player (b. 1932)
