= César Herrera =

César Herrera can refer to:

- César Herrera (basketball) (born 1937), Mexican Olympic basketball player
- César Herrera (rower) (born 1955), Cuban Olympic rower
- César Herrera (racewalker), Colombian race walker in the 2015 Pan American Race Walking Cup
- Cesar Herrera (baseball), American baseball player selected in the 2004 Rule 5 draft
- César Herrera (karateka), Venezuelan Olympic karateka in the 2015 Pan American Games
- César Herrera (runner), Paraguayan athlete in the 2004 South American Cross Country Championships
