= Tataki =

Food preparation methods in Japanese cuisine

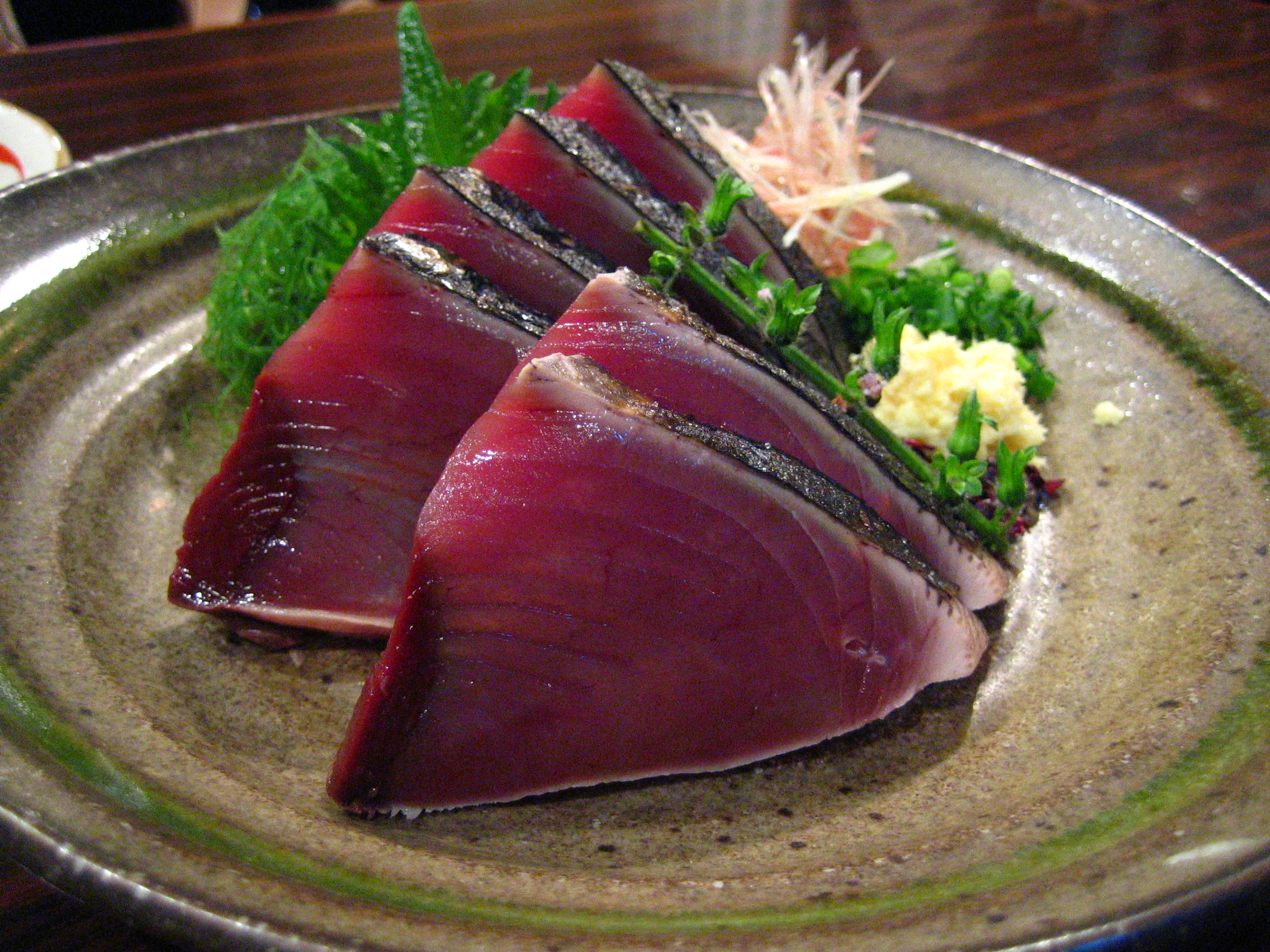
Skipjack tuna tataki (カツオのたたき, katsuo no tataki)

Two methods of preparing fish or meat in Japanese cuisine are called tataki or tosa-mi. In Japanese, tataki (たたき) means "pounded" or "hit into pieces".

== Cooked food ==
Katsuo no tataki (seared bonito) with garlic and green onion at Hirome Market (ひろめ市場), Kōchi

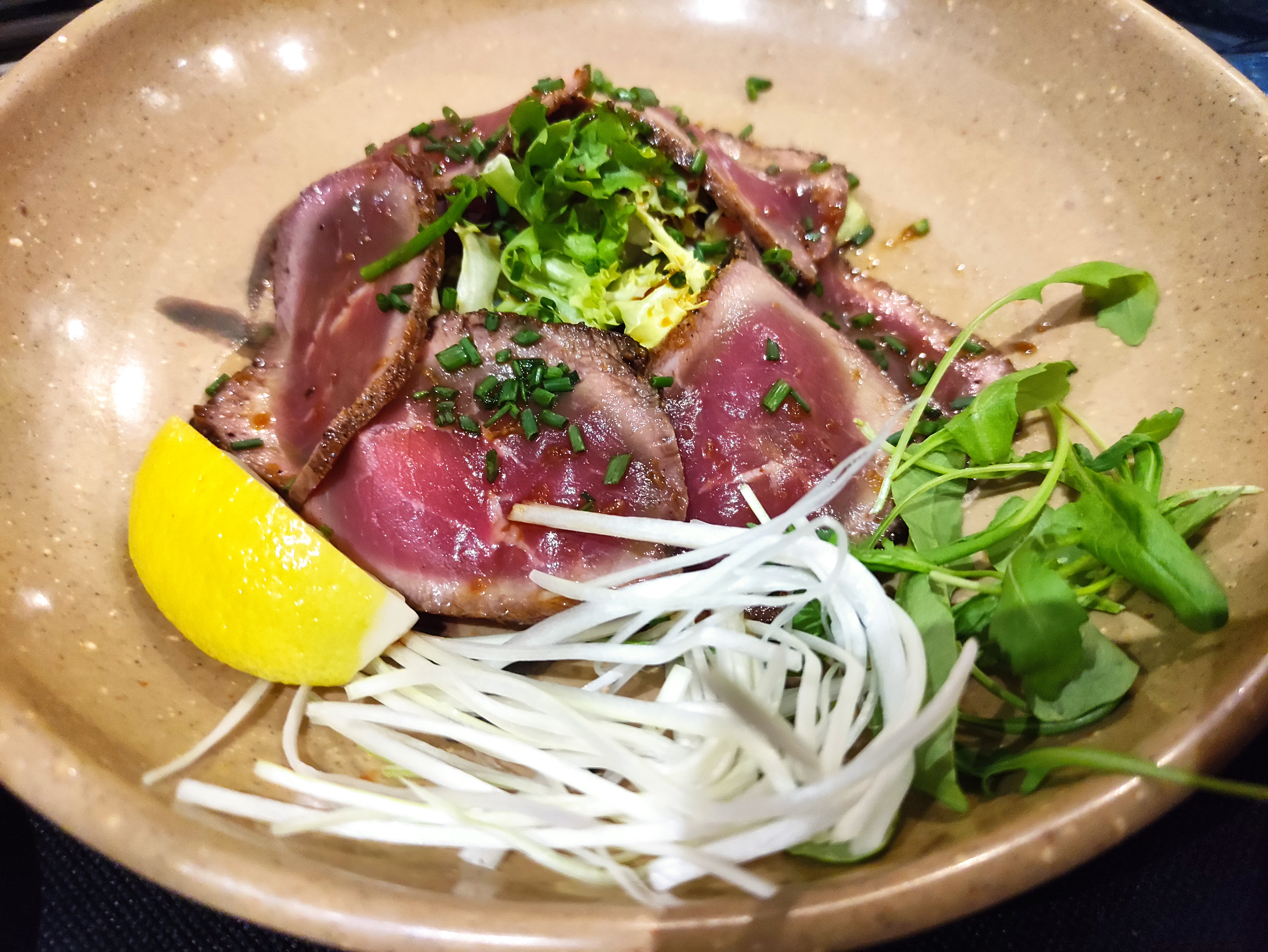
Veal tataki

In the first tataki method, the meat or fish is seared very briefly over a hot flame or in a pan, and can be briefly marinated in vinegar, sliced thin, and seasoned with ginger (which is ground or pounded into a paste, hence the name). Food so prepared can also be served like sashimi with soy sauce and garnishes.

The method originated in Tosa Province, now part of Kōchi Prefecture, where it was applied to bonito (katsuo-no-tataki). Lore has it that it was developed by Sakamoto Ryōma, a 19th-century rebel samurai, who picked up the European technique of grilling meat from the foreigners resident in Nagasaki.

== Uncooked food ==
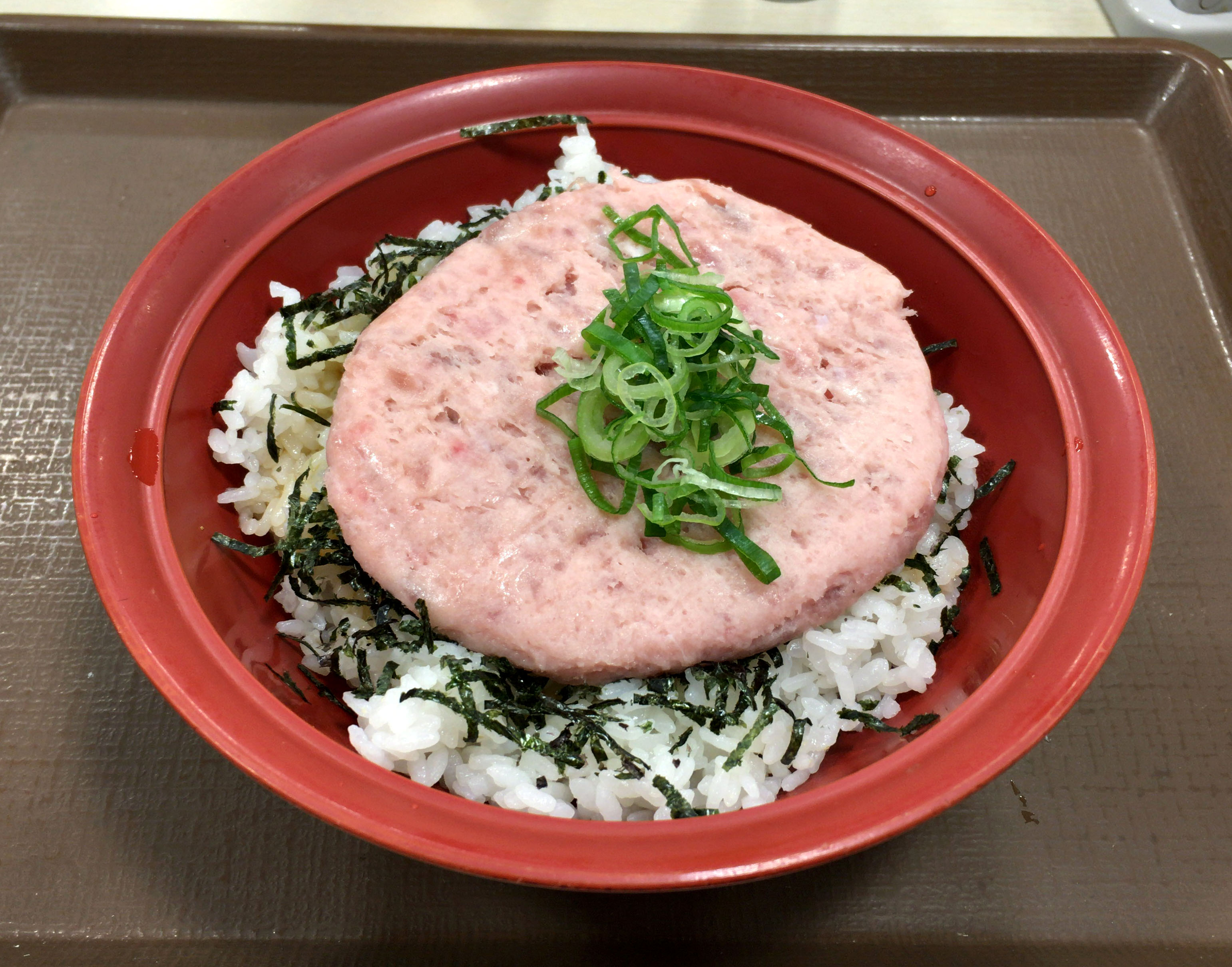
Raw tuna tataki served as donburi

In the second tataki method, it is the food that is "hit into pieces". Fish such as tuna or horse mackerel are chopped and mixed with garnishes such as garlic, ginger, green onions or shiso leaves. Soy sauce may be poured over the chopped mixture before consumption.
