= Chavira =

Chavira is a surname. Notable people with the surname include:

- Ignacio Chavira (born 1936), Mexican basketball player
- Itan Chavira (born 1987), American ice hockey player
- Javier Lozano Chavira (born 1971), Mexican footballer
- Ricardo Antonio Chavira (born 1971), American actor
