= Kim Seung-gyu (disambiguation) =

Kim Seung-gyu is a South Korean association football player.

Kim Seung-gyu may also refer to:

- Kim Seung-gyu (judoka), South Korean judoka
- Kim Seung-gyu (basketball), South Korean basketball player
- Kim Seung-kew, South Korean former government minister
