= Armando Herrera =

Armando Herrera may refer to:

- Armando Herrera (triple jumper)
- Armando Herrera (basketball)
