= Gadea =

Gadea is a surname. Notable people with the surname include:

- Hilda Gadea (1921–1974), Peruvian economist, Communist leader, and writer
- Kelly Gadéa (born 1991), French footballer
- Manuel Gadea (born 1942), Uruguayan basketball player
- Sergio Gadea (born 1984), Spanish motorcycle racer
