= Katsuji =

Katsuji is both a masculine Japanese given name and a surname. Notable people with the name include:

== Given name ==
- Katsuji Adachi (安達 勝治, 1942–2010), better known as Mr. Hito, Japanese professional wrestler
- Katsuji Fukuda (福田 勝治, 1889–1991), Japanese photographer
- Katsuji Hasegawa (born 1946), Japanese golfer
- Katsuji Ito (伊藤 勝二, born 1946), Japanese swimmer
- Katsuji Matsumoto (松本かつぢ, 1904–1986), Japanese illustrator and manga artist
- Katsuji Miyazaki (abt. 1915–1993), Japanese engineer
- Katsuji Mori (森 功至, born 1945), Japanese voice actor
- Katsuji Morishima (森島 勝司, born 1942), Japanese ice hockey player
- Katsuji Morishita (森下 勝司), Japanese animator
- Katsuji Tsunoda (角田 勝次, born 1943), Japanese basketball player
- Katsuji Ueda (上田 勝次, 1945–2017), Japanese kickboxer, martial artist and professional wrestler
- Katsuji Watanabe (渡辺 勝治, born 1940), Japanese boxer

== Surname ==
- Ryo Katsuji (勝地 涼) (born 1986), Japanese actor

== See also ==
- 15368 Katsuji, a main-belt minor planet
