= Guillermo Torres =

Guillermo Torres may refer to:

- Guillermo Torres (footballer) (1909–1985), Chilean footballer
- Guillermo Torres (basketball) (born 1937), Mexican Olympic basketball player
- Guillermo José Torres (born 1943), retired Puerto Rican television reporter and news anchorman
- Guillermo Alfredo Torres (born 1959), Cuban sport shooter
- Guillermo Torres (songwriter) (born 1966), American songwriter and record producer
- Guillermo Torrez (born 1973), Bolivian politician
- Guillermo Torres (wrestler) (born 1986), Mexican Olympic free-style wrestler
