= Katsuo =

- Gender: Male

Origin
- Origin: Japanese
- Meaning: Different meanings depending on the kanji used

Katsuo (written: 勝男, 勝夫, 勝雄 or 嘉葎雄) is a masculine Japanese given name. Notable people with the name include:

- Katsuo Bai (梅 勝夫; born 1940), Japanese basketball player
- Katsuo Haga (芳賀 勝男; born 1938), Japanese boxer
- Katsuo Kameoka (亀岡 勝雄; 1905–?), Japanese boxer
- Katsuo Kanda (神田 勝夫; born 1966), Japanese footballer
- Kiyokuni Katsuo (清國 勝雄; born 1941), Japanese sumo wrestler
- Katsuo Nakamura (中村 嘉葎雄; born 1938), Japanese actor
- Katsuo Nishida (西田 勝男; born 1929), Japanese long-distance runner
- Katsuo Okazaki (岡崎 勝男; 1897–1965), Japanese long-distance runner and politician
- Katsuo Osugi (大杉 勝男; 1945–1992), Japanese baseball player
- Katsuo Takaishi (高石 勝男; 1906–1966), Japanese swimmer
- Katsuo Tokashiki (渡嘉敷 勝男; born 1960), Japanese boxer
- Yutakayama Katsuo (豊山 勝男; born 1937), Japanese sumo wrestler
- Cleyton Katsuo (クレイトンカツオ, born 1988), Brazilian woodworker and developer
- Katsuo Yakura (矢倉克夫), Japanese politician

== Fictional characters ==
- Katsuo Isono (磯野 カツオ), a character in the manga series Sazae-san

== See also ==
- Katsuo, Japanese name for Skipjack tuna and occasionally its substitute bonito
- Katsuō-ji, a Buddhist temple in Osaka Prefecture, Japan
