= Leandrinha Du Art =

Brazilian digital influencer (1995)

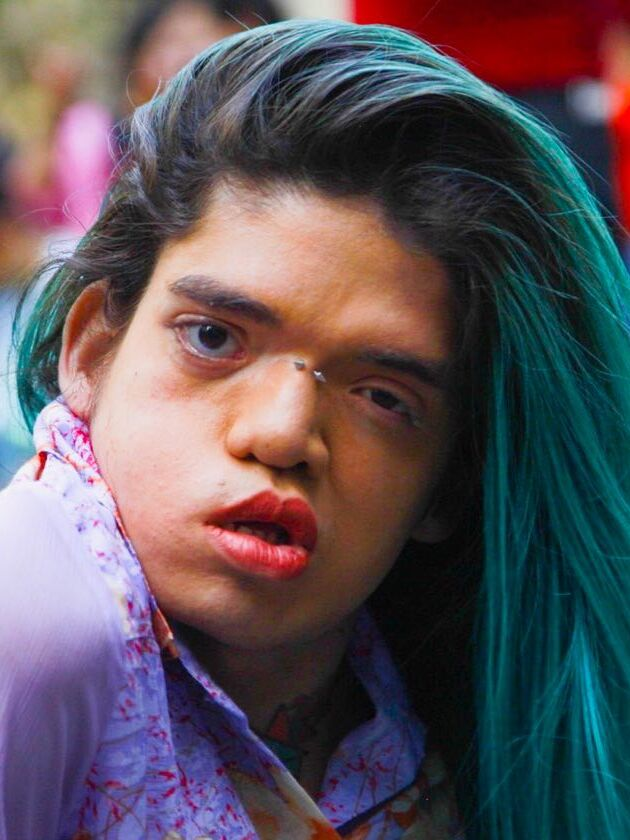
- Duarte in 2019
- Born: Leandra Duarte; 28 March 1995 (age 31); Passos, Minas Gerais, Brazil
- Occupation: Digital influencer

Leandra Duarte, better known as Leandrinha Du Art (Passos, 28 March 1995), is a Brazilian digital influencer. She works as a photographer, producer, blogger, and communicator. She is an activist for the causes of people with disabilities and LGBTQ people, and is also a columnist for Mídia Ninja. She is considered a reference on social media regarding gender and sexuality.

== Biography ==
Leandrinha was born in Passos, Minas Gerais, with Larsen Syndrome, a rare genetic condition that affects the development of the fetus's bones during gestation. Due to the malformation, she faced self-esteem issues during adolescence and wore looser clothing. Having been raised in a religious family, Leandrinha attended church. At age 17, she decided to leave the religion because she considered its precepts sexist and because she was exploring her sexuality, initially coming out as gay to her family and, less than a month later, as a trans woman. At the same age, she decided to stop undergoing surgeries related to Larsen Syndrome.

== Career ==
She began writing erotic short stories in 2013. She started her online career in 2015 with posts on Facebook. Until 2021, she had a personal blog where she published texts such as chronicles, erotic short stories, and reflections. In 2018, she ran for federal deputy for the Socialism and Liberty Party (PSOL), but was not elected. In 2019, she was invited to give a speech at the Legislative Assembly of São Paulo, where she spoke about the lack of accessibility in the institution. In 2022, she stood out by walking the runway for the first time at São Paulo Fashion Week (SPFW).
