= Ian Johnston (field hockey) =

Canadian field hockey player (1929–2020)

Reginald "Ian" Hallam Johnston (4 March 1929 – 11 December 2020) was a Canadian field hockey player.

Originally from Dublin in Ireland, Johnston moved to British Columbia in Canada after World War II. He played club hockey with Grasshoppers Hockey Club in Vancouver and was later selected for a representative British Columbia team. Together with Tony Boyd and Paddy Ruttle, Johnston was one of a number of Irish field hockey players selected for the Canadian men's field hockey team. As "Canada's first ever field hockey captain", he played in a number of qualifying games ahead of the 1964 Summer Olympics in Tokyo. Also selected for the Olympic team, he participated in several of Canada's games at the competition. He co-captained the Canadian team in the men's field hockey competition at the 1967 Pan American Games, in which Canada finished fourth. He retired from competition shortly after the 1967 games.

Johnston died in December 2020.
