= Simón Peredes =

Peruvian basketball player

Personal information
- Nationality: Peruvian
- Born: 24 December 1945 (age 79)

Sport
- Sport: Basketball

Simón Peredes (born 24 December 1945) is a Peruvian basketball player. He competed in the men's tournament at the 1964 Summer Olympics.
