= José María Lozano (basketball) =

Mexican basketball player (born 1936)

Personal information
- Born: 27 April 1936 (age 89) Mexico City, Mexico

Sport
- Sport: Basketball

José María Lozano (born 27 April 1936) is a Mexican basketball player. He competed in the men's tournament at the 1960 Summer Olympics.
