= Tony Boyd =

Canadian field hockey player

Personal information
- Nationality: Canadian
- Born: 2 April 1932 (age 94) Ireland

Sport
- Sport: Field hockey

Tony Boyd (born 2 April 1932) is a former Canadian field hockey player who represented Canada in the 1964 Summer Olympics.

Originally from Dublin, Ireland, Boyd was introduced to the sport of field hockey at Avoca School at the age of 11. He did not play seriously until he went to Trinity College Dublin in 1952. After playing a few years, he moved to Toronto, and later joined Toronto Field Hockey club. He played for Toronto Field Hockey club for two years before he moved to Vancouver and joined Red Bird Field Hockey club. While he was a player, he was elected president of the British Columbia Field Hockey Association. Boyd assisted with the founding of the Canadian Field Hockey Association in May 1961 and took on the role of treasurer.

Together with Paddy Ruttle and Ian Johnston, Boyd was one of a number of Irish-born players who made up the Canadian mens field hockey team during the 1960s. He was a member of the team that represented Canada in the men's tournament at the 1964 Summer Olympics.

Boyd was inducted into Field Hockey Canada's "hall of fame" in 2021.
