= Ricardo Duarte =

Peruvian basketball player (born 1940)

Personal information
- Born: February 9, 1940 (age 86) Jauja, Peru
- Listed height: 6 ft 10.25 in (2.09 m)
- Listed weight: 200 lb (91 kg)

Career information
- Playing career: 1957–1982
- Position: Center
- Number: 5

Career history
- 1957: Club Universitario de Deportes
- 1958–1977: Regatas Lima
- 1978–1979: Club Deportivo Field
- 1980–1982: Club Aviación

Career highlights
- As player: FIBA Summer Olympics Top Scorer (1964); FIBA World Cup Top Scorer (1963); Pan American Games Top Scorer (1963); 3× FIBA South American Championship Top Scorer (1963, 1966, 1968); Bolivarian Games Top Scorer (1965); Sports Laurels (Peru) (1985); FIBA's 50 Greatest Players (1991); Olympic Collar (Peru) (2007)
Medals
Men's basketball
Representing Peru
FIBA South American Championship
Silver medal – second place	1963 Peru
Bronze medal – third place	1966 Argentina
Bronze medal – third place	1968 Paraguay

Ricardo Duarte Mungi (born February 9, 1940) is a Peruvian former professional basketball player. Standing at 2.09 m (6 ft 10 1/4 in) tall, Duarte played at the center position. While representing the Peruvian national team, Duarte was the FIBA World Cup Top Scorer in 1963, as well as the FIBA Summer Olympics Top Scorer in 1964. He was named one of FIBA's 50 Greatest Players, in 1991.

== Professional career ==
Duarte's club playing career spanned a total of 25 years, lasting from 1957 to 1982. Duarte first played with Universitario Deportes' men's basketball team in 1957. He then played with Regatas Lima's men's basketball team, from 1958 to 1977. After that, he played with Club Deportivo Field's men's basketball team, from 1978 to 1979. He finished his career with Club Aviación's men's basketball team, with which he played from 1980 to 1982.

== National team career ==
Duarte was a member of the senior men's Peruvian national team, from 1957 to 1977. With Peru, he played at the 1963 FIBA World Championship, where he was the tournament's top scorer, the unofficial 1966 Extraordinary World Championship, and the 1967 FIBA World Championship. He also played at the 1964 Summer Olympic Games, which he also led in scoring.

In addition, he played at the 1963 Pan American Games, the 1967 Pan American Games, and the 1971 Pan American Games. He also played at the following editions of the FIBA South American Championship: 1958, 1961, 1963 (silver medal), 1966 (bronze medal), 1968 (bronze medal), 1971, and 1977. He also competed at the 1961 Bolivarian Games, and the 1965 Bolivarian Games.

== Personal life ==
Duarte's brothers, Enrique, Luis, and Raúl, were also professional basketball players. Ricardo and all three of his brothers represented Peru at the 1964 Tokyo Summer Olympics.
