= Guillermo Wagner =

Mexican basketball player (1939–1993)

Joseph Williams “Bill” Wagner (Guillermo Wagner)
Personal information
- Full name: Joseph Williams Wagner
- Born: 2 May 1939 Chihuahua, Mexico
- Died: 27 October 1993 (aged 54) Cochise County, Arizona, U.S.
- Education: University of Arizona
- Spouse: Claire H. Casaday
- Children: 3

Sport
- Sport: Basketball

Joseph Williams Wagner (2 May 1939 – 27 October 1993) was a Mexican basketball player, farmer, international businessman and pilot. An alumnus of the University of Arizona, where he played basketball and football, he competed in the men's basketball tournament at the 1960 Summer Olympics representing Mexico.
