= Danilo Coito =

Uruguayan basketball player

Personal information
- Born: 23 October 1931; Florida, Uruguay

Sport
- Sport: Basketball

Danilo Rafael Coito Pérez (born 23 October 1931) was a Uruguayan basketball player. He competed in the men's tournament at the 1960 Summer Olympics.
