= Héctor Aizpuro =

Mexican basketball player (1940–2025)

Personal information
- Born: 10 October 1940 Monterrey, Mexico
- Died: 8 May 2025 (aged 84) Mexicali, Baja California, Mexico

Sport
- Sport: Basketball

Héctor Aizpuro (10 October 1940 – 8 May 2025) was a Mexican basketball player. He competed in the men's tournament at the 1960 Summer Olympics.

Aizpuro died on 8 May 2025 in Mexicali, Baja California, at the age of 84.
