= Tomás Sangio =

Peruvian basketball player

Personal information
- Nationality: Peruvian
- Born: 25 May 1942 (age 82)

Sport
- Sport: Basketball

Tomás Sangio (born 25 May 1942) is a Peruvian basketball player. He competed in the men's tournament at the 1964 Summer Olympics.
