= Richard Chopping (field hockey) =

Canadian field hockey player

Richard Chopping (11 September 1929 – 13 November 1999) was a Canadian field hockey player who competed in the 1964 Summer Olympics.
