= Ricardo Vázquez =

Uruguayan cyclist

Personal information
- Born: 25 September 1932 (age 94)

Cycling career
- Sport: Cycling

Ricardo Vázquez (born 25 September 1932) is a former Uruguayan cyclist. He competed in the individual road race and team time trial events at the 1964 Summer Olympics.
