= Óscar Benalcázar =

Peruvian basketball player (born 1942)

Personal information
- Born: 2 November 1942 (age 82); Lima, Peru

Sport
- Sport: Basketball

Óscar Benalcázar Coz (born 2 November 1942) is a Peruvian basketball player. He competed in the men's tournament at the 1964 Summer Olympics.
