= George Marsh (sport shooter) =

Canadian sports shooter

Personal information
- Born: 9 June 1938 (age 88)

Sport
- Sport: Sports shooting

George Marsh (born 9 June 1938) is a Canadian former sports shooter. He competed in two events at the 1964 Summer Olympics.
