= Carol Ann Morrow =

Canadian diver (born 1946)

Carol Morrow
Personal information
- Full name: Carol Ann Morrow
- Nationality: Canadian
- Born: 6 April 1946 (age 79) New Westminster, British Columbia, Canada

Sport
- Sport: Diving

Carol Ann Morrow (born 6 April 1946) is a Canadian diver. She competed in two events at the 1964 Summer Olympics.

== Career ==
Originally a swimmer, Morrow was considered to be "only a bit better than mediocre" and soon after turned to diving under the coaching of Irene MacDonald and by 1961 had won diving titles in British Columbia and Pacific North West for her age group.

During the trials for the 1963 Pan American Games, Morrow finished runner-up behind Judy Stewart in the female group. She achieved a clean sweep of titles in the 1963 British Columbia Championships women's open, with victory scores of 116.27, 110.16 and 58.76 in the 1-metre, 3-metre and tower events respectively. She would train for at least two hours a day, four days a week with her aim to become a Canadian diving champion.

Following the Olympics, she won the Alberta Open 1-metre and 3-metre springboard diving championships in September 1964. In the 1965 Canadian Open springboard diving championships, she won the 1-metre event and was runner-up in the 3-metre event. Her closest opponent was Judy Stewart, who finished in the alternate positions for the respective events.

== Personal ==
Morrow is the daughter of a former Olympic swimmer and attended Lester Pearson High School.
