= Oscar Almada =

Uruguayan cyclist

Personal information
- Full name: Oscar Almada Correa
- Born: 18 October 1943 (age 82)
- Height: 174 cm (5 ft 9 in)
- Weight: 68 kg (150 lb)

Cycling career
- Sport: Cycling

Oscar Almada (born 18 October 1943) is a former Uruguayan cyclist. He competed in the 1000m time trial and team pursuit events at the 1964 Summer Olympics.
