= Billy Baum =

Puerto Rican former basketball player

Billy Baum (born 17 November 1946) is a Puerto Rican former basketball player who competed in the 1972 Summer Olympics.
