= Mario Peña (basketball) =

Mexican basketball player (born 1940)

Personal information
- Nationality: Mexican
- Born: 7 September 1940 (age 84)

Sport
- Sport: Basketball

Mario Peña (born 7 September 1940) is a Mexican basketball player. He competed in the men's tournament at the 1964 Summer Olympics.
