= Óscar Duarte =

Óscar Duarte may refer to:

- Óscar Duarte (footballer, born 1950), former Portuguese footballer
- Óscar Duarte (footballer, born 1989), Costa Rican footballer
