= Nobuo Kaiho =

Japanese basketball player (1941–2015)

Personal information
- Nationality: Japanese
- Born: 21 December 1941
- Died: 19 April 2015 (aged 73); Ichikawa, Chiba Prefecture, Japan

Sport
- Sport: Basketball

Nobuo Kaiho (海保 宣生, Kaiho Nobuo, 21 December 1941 – 19 April 2015) was a Japanese basketball player. He competed in the men's tournament at the 1964 Summer Olympics.
