= Manuel Valerio =

Peruvian basketball player (born 1943)

Personal information
- Nationality: Peruvian
- Born: 1 January 1943 (age 82)

Sport
- Sport: Basketball

Manuel Valerio (born 1 January 1943) is a Peruvian basketball player. He competed in the men's tournament at the 1964 Summer Olympics.
