= José Cestero =

Puerto Rican basketball player

Personal information
- Full name: José Ángel Cestero Rodríguez
- Nickname: "Totin"
- Born: 24 January 1938; Río Piedras, Puerto Rico
- Died: 10 May 2014 (aged 76); San Juan, Puerto Rico

José Ángel Cestero Rodríguez (Note: In this Spanish name, the first or paternal surname is Cestero and the second or maternal family name is Rodríguez.) (24 January 1938 in Río Piedras, Puerto Rico – 10 May 2014 in San Juan, Puerto Rico), nicknamed "Totín", was a Puerto Rican former basketball player who competed in the 1960 Summer Olympics.
