= Tadeusz Blauth =

Polish basketball player (born 1939)

Personal information
- Nationality: Polish
- Born: 1 July 1939 (age 85); Warsaw, Poland

Sport
- Sport: Basketball

Tadeusz Blauth (born 1 July 1939) is a Polish former basketball player. He competed in the men's tournament at the 1964 Summer Olympics.
