= John Morales (meteorologist) =

American meteorologist

John Morales is a meteorologist born in Schenectady, New York and raised in Puerto Rico. He attended the meteorology program at Cornell University and was then hired by the National Weather Service in 1984. In 1991, he was hired by the Spanish language television network Univision and founded his company Climadata Corporation. He has won three Emmy Awards: in 1993 for "48 Horas Antes de la Tormenta" (English: "48 Hours Before the Storm"); in 2005 for his coverage of Hurricane Wilma; and in 2010 for a special program about the upcoming hurricane season.

Morales has the Seal of Approval from both the American Meteorological Society (AMS) and the National Weather Association (NWA). He was given the prestigious distinction of Certified Consulting Meteorologist from the AMS. In 2003, he became Chief Meteorologist at WSCV in Miami. In May 2009, John made the switch to English language television, joining NBC O&O WTVJ in Miami.

The meteorologist, whose station covers Miami-Fort Lauderdale, went viral on Oct. 7, 2024, when he broke down during a live broadcast as he told his audience the barometric pressure had dropped 50 points in 10 hours as Hurricane Milton bore down upon his community. A week earlier, before Milton, he had published a story about Hurricane Helene, entitled, "Hurricane Helene isn’t an outlier. It’s a harbinger of the future." In it, he described the reactions he got from some viewers about being a "climate militant” and "overhyping emerging weather threats."

In June of 2025 he warned viewers that his forecasts during hurricane season might not be as accurate as they had been in past years due to the Trump administration's cuts to the National Weather Service.
