= Nancy Duarte =

American writer, speaker, and CEO

- Born: United States
- Occupations: Non-fiction writer; CEO
- Writing career
- Period: 2008 – present
- Genre: Non-fiction
- Subjects: Business; presentations
- Website: www.duarte.com

Nancy Duarte is an American writer, speaker, and CEO. Duarte is the author of several books, including Slide:ology: The Art and Science of Creating Great Presentations (2008), Resonate: Present Visual Stories that Transform Audiences (2010), the HBR Guide to Persuasive Presentations (2012), and Illuminate: Ignite Change Through Speeches, Stories, Ceremonies and Symbols (2016). She is the CEO of Duarte, Inc.

== Education ==
Duarte attended the Management Development for Entrepreneurs program from the Anderson School of Management at UCLA.

== Career ==
Duarte worked with Al Gore on the documentary slide show known as An Inconvenient Truth. Duarte has also worked with TED Talks on quality changes for the presentations given at their events, and has presented her own TED Talks as well. She has been cited by publications writing about presentation style including The Guardian. She is currently the CEO of her eponymous company Duarte, Inc. The company has created tens of thousands of presentations for use by various companies and organizations.

== Books ==
Duarte's first book was Slide:ology: The Art and Science of Creating Great Presentations. Published in 2008, the book discusses the elements of effective public presentations. In 2010 she published her second book, Resonate: Present Visual Stories that Transform Audiences, a follow-up to her first book that expands upon her method of creating professional presentations. Part of the book draws upon a pattern Duarte states is common among great narrators or storytellers, where they spend time moving between "what is" and "what could be." Duarte's third book, The Harvard Business Review Guide to Persuasive Presentations, was released in 2012. In 2016, Duarte coauthored the book Illuminate: Ignite Change Through Speeches, Stories, Ceremonies and Symbols with Patti Sanchez. In 2019, Duarte published her fourth book Data Story: Explain Data and Inspire Action Through Story.
