= Dariusz Świerczewski =

Polish basketball player (1936–2005)

Personal information
- Nationality: Polish
- Born: 22 February 1936; Lublin, Poland
- Died: 9 February 2005 (aged 68); Warsaw, Poland

Sport
- Sport: Basketball

Dariusz Świerczewski (22 February 1936 – 9 February 2005) was a Polish basketball player. He competed in the men's tournament at the 1960 Summer Olympics. He studied at the Poznań University of Technology.
