= Carlos Vásquez (basketball) =

Peruvian basketball player (1942–1984)

Personal information
- Born: 8 July 1942; Lima, Peru
- Died: 24 July 1984 (aged 42); Lima, Peru

Sport
- Sport: Basketball

Carlos Vásquez Pancorvo (8 July 1942 – 24 July 1984), nicknamed "Chino", was a Peruvian basketball player. He competed in the men's tournament at the 1964 Summer Olympics.
