= Jeong Jin-bong =

South Korean basketball player

Personal information
- Nationality: South Korean
- Born: 21 March 1943 (age 82)

Sport
- Sport: Basketball

Jeong Jin-bong (born 21 March 1943) is a South Korean basketball player. He competed in the men's tournament at the 1964 Summer Olympics.
