= Vid Cencic =

Uruguayan cyclist (1933–2020)

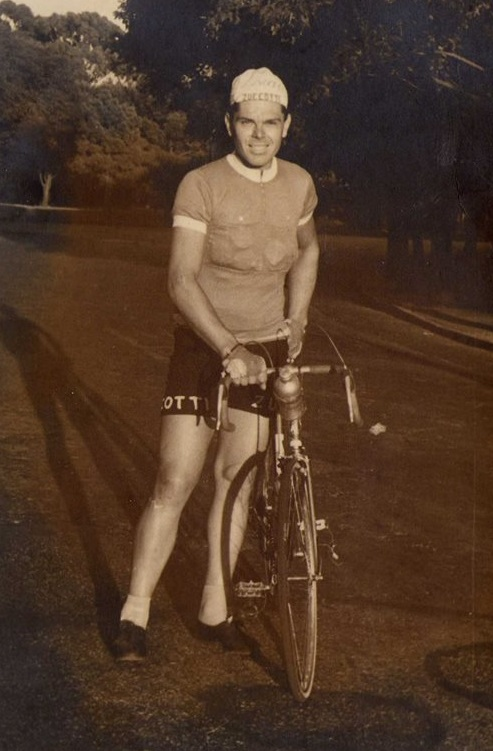

Personal information
- Born: 9 May 1933 Robidišče, Italy (now Slovenia)
- Died: 22 March 2020 (aged 86)

Cycling career
- Sport: Cycling

Vid Cencic (9 May 1933 – 22 March 2020) was a Uruguayan cyclist. He competed in the individual road race and team time trial events at the 1964 Summer Olympics.
