= Masakatsu Fujie =

Japanese scientist (born 1945)

Masakatsu G. Fujie 藤江正克
- Born: 1945 (age 80–81)
- Occupation: Professor

Masakatsu G. Fujie (藤江正克, Fujie Masakatsu; born 1945) is a Japanese scientist who has played a major role in cutting-edge research in biomedical engineering. He has been responsible for many advances in the field of robotics.

A longtime professor at Waseda University, he has led teams that have developed an intelligent mobile robot and a remote control manipulator, among many other devices. He made a significant contribution to the development of a medical treatment support system that helps in the recovery of human functions.

He has held leadership positions in a number of professional organizations and has helped establish UNESCO's World Academy of Biomedical Technology (WABT). He is currently doing "research that fuses cutting-edge science and engineering and sports sciences and is focused on the impending arrival of the super-aged society."

== Education ==
Fujie majored in mechanical engineering at the Graduate School of Science and Engineering at Waseda University in Tokyo, Japan, and received a master's degree in Engineering in 1971. He received a Ph.D. in Engineering from the same institution in 1999.

- Ph.D. degree in Engineering, 1999, Waseda University, Tokyo, Japan
- Master's degree in Engineering, 1971, Major in mechanical engineering at the Graduate School of Science and Engineering, Waseda University, Tokyo, Japan

== Career ==
From 1971 to 1984, Fujie worked as a Researcher at the Mechanical Engineering Research Laboratory at Hitachi Ltd. He was Senior Researcher in the same laboratory from 1984 to 1995, and from 1995 to 1999 was Principal Researcher and project leader of the Medical and Welfare Apparatus Development Project in that laboratory. From 1999 to 2001, he was Head Researcher in the same lab and Director of the Medical and Welfare Apparatus Development Research Laboratory. Since 2001, he has been Professor at School of Science and Engineering at Waseda University.

A 2008 Washington Post article reported that Japan, with a shortage of young workers, and a disinclination to take in immigrants, was "marching into the depopulated future with the help of robots", many of which were "on display...at the Great Robot Exhibition in Tokyo's National Museum of Nature and Science." The Post paraphrased Fujie as telling foreign journalists that "service robots could help reduce government spending on health care, take over many dreary service jobs and prop up Japan's 'societal vitality.'"

=== Research Interests ===
- Robotics
- Robotic surgery
- Surgical Segment Navigator
- Medical, rehabilitation and assistive engineering
- Computer-assisted surgery
- Control engineering
- Intelligent mechatronics

=== Research projects ===
- “Global Robot Academia” for MEXT (Ministry of Education, Culture, Sports, Science and Technology of Japan) Global COE (Center of Excellence) Program (2008-)
- “Research and Development of a Nano-intelligent Technical Device for High Risk Intrauterine Fetal Surgery” for the Ministry of Health, Labor and Welfare (2005-2008)
- “Project for Practical Application of Robots which Support Human Beings” for the Ministry of Economy, Trade and Industry (2005-2008)
- “Consolidated Research Institute for Advanced Science and Medical Care (ASMeW)” for MEXT Super COE Program (2004-2009)
- “Development of Support System for Minimally Invasive Surgery and Microsurgery” for MEXT Knowledge Cluster Initiative Program (2004-2009)
- “The Innovative Research on Symbiosis Technologies for Human and Robots in the Elderly Dominated Society” for MEXT 21st Century COE Program (2003-2008)
- “Research and Development of Analysis, Support and Alternative Equipment for Physical Function” for the Ministry of Health, Labor and Welfare (2003-2008)
- “WABOT-HOUSE Project” (contract research) (2002-2007)
- “Research and development of a robotic system for Microsurgery: a realization of futuristic medical treatment” for the Ministry of Economy, Trade and Industry (2002-2007)
- “Human-Robot Coexistence and Coordination System Type II” for the Health and Welfare Ministry (contract research) (2000-2002)
- “Integrated Support System for Diagnosis and Treatment of Heart Disease” for the Health and Welfare Ministry (contract research) (1999-2004)
- “Surgery Support System for Disease Such as Brain Tumors” for the Health and Welfare Ministry(contract research) (1995-2000)
- “AI Ambulation Exercise System” for the Health and Welfare Ministry (contract research) (1992-1995)
- Development of a manipulator for a space project (1985-1987)
- Development of a bipedal robot for EXPO ‘85 in Tsukuba, Japan (1983-1985)
- Development of a robot hand, an application of shape-memory alloy (1983-1986)

=== Teaching ===
- Professor in the School of Science and Engineering, Waseda University (2001-present)
- Part-time lecturer on Orthopedic Surgery, School of Medicine, Kobe University (2002)
- Part-time lecturer in the Graduate School of Frontier Sciences, University of Tokyo (2002)
- Visiting lecturer on "Robotics" at Korea Institute of Science and Technology, Korea Advanced Institute of Science and Technology, and Seoul National University (1999)
- Part-time lecturer on "Introduction to mechanical engineering" in the Department of Mechanical Engineering, Ibaraki University (1999-2001)
- Visiting lecturer in the “TARA Project” in the Graduate School of SIE, University of Tsukuba (1992-2001)
- Occasional lecturer on "Introduction to Robotics" in the Department of Precision Engineering, Graduate School of Engineering, University of Tokyo (1990-1995)
- Part-time lecturer on "Introduction to Robotics" in the Department of Mechanical Engineering, Graduate School of Science and Technology, Tokyo University of Science (1984)

== Other professional activities ==
- 2010, IEEE Robotics and Automation Society / IEEE Engineering in Medicine and Biology Society, International Conference on Biomedical Robotics and Biomechatronics, General Co-Chair
- 1991–present, IEEE Robotics and Automation Society / RSJ, International Conference on Intelligent Robots and Systems, Steering/Advisory Committee
- 2009, IEEE International Conference on Robotics and Automation, Workshop Organaizer
- 2009, IEEE Robotics and Automation Society / RSJ, International Conference on Intelligent Robots and Systems, Harashima Award Nomination Committee, Program Committee(Associate Editor)
- 2005, IEEE Robotics and Automation Society / RSJ, International Conference on Intelligent Robots and Systems, Regional Program Committee
- 2004, IEEE Robotics and Automation Society, Industrial Activity Board, National Chair
- 2004, IEEE Robotics and Automation Society / RSJ, International Conference on Intelligent Robots and Systems, Organizing Committee and Program Committee
- 2003, IEEE Robotics and Automation Society, International Conference on Robotics and Automation, Technical Program Committee
- 2003, IEEE Robotics and Automation Society / RSJ, International Conference on Intelligent Robots and Systems, General Vice Chair
- 2002–present, The International Society for Computer Aided Surgery, Trustee
- 2002, JSME, Head of the Robotics Mechatronics Division
- 1991-2003, IEEE Robotics and Automation Society / RSJ, International Conference on Intelligent Robots and Systems, Best Paper Award Committee
- 1999, IEEE International Conference on Systems, Man and Cybernetics (SMC), Program Committee and Local Conference Committee
- 1990, IEEE International Workshop on Intelligent Robots and Systems, General Chair
- 1990, Established UNESCO WABT (the World Academy of Biomedical Technology within UNESCO); appointed committee member for Japan

=== Lectures and speeches ===
Fujie has been an invited speaker at the 2003, 2005, 2006, and 2009 IEEE International Conferences on Robotics and Automation. He has also been an invited speaker at the 2009 International IEEE EMBS Conference on Neural Engineering, the 2008 Asian Conference on Computer Aided Surgery, the 2008 Korea University Symposium, the 2007 General Assembly of the Japan Medical Congress, the 2006 International Symposium on the Development of Surgical Support Systems, the 2004 IEEE Industrial Activity Board, and the 2003 General Assembly of the Japan Medical Congress.

== Membership ==
Fujie is a member of the following professional organizations:

- IEEE Robotics and Automation Society
- IEEE Engineering in Medicine and Biology Society
- The Japan Society of Mechanical Engineers (Fellow, 2010 Vice Chairperson)
- The Robotic Society of Japan (Fellow)
- The International Society for Computer Aided Surgery (Trustee)
- The Society of Instrument and Control Engineers (Steering committee of System Integration division)
- The Japan Society of Computer Aided Surgery (Vice Chairperson)
- The Japanese Society for Wellbeing Science and Assistive Technology (Trustee)
- The Japan Society of Life Support Technology (Trustee)
- The Society of Biomechanisms Japan
- The Japanese Society for Medical and Biological Engineering
- International Society for Gerontechnology

== Honors and awards ==
Fujie has earned the following honors.

- 2008, IEEE Robotics and Automation Society / IEEE Industrial Electronic Society / RSJ / SICE, IROS Harashima Award for Innovative Technologies, for "contributions in rehabilitation and medical robotics"
- 2007, The Japan Robot Award of the Year (hosted by the Ministry of Economy, Trade and Industry of Japan / The Japan Machinery Federation), Jury's Choice Prize
- 2007, The Japan Society of Mechanical Engineers (JSME) Robotics and Mechatronics Division, Contribution Award
- 2006, The Robotic Society of Japan (RSJ), Fellow
- 2006, The Japan Society of Mechanical Engineers (JSME) Robotics and Mechatronics Division, ROBOMEC Award
- 2005, The Japan Society of Mechanical Engineers (JSME) Robotics and Mechatronics Division, Achievement Award
- 2004, The Japan Society of Mechanical Engineers (JSME) Robotics and Mechatronics Division, Contribution Award
- 2002, The Japan Society of Mechanical Engineers (JSME) Machine Design and Tribology Division, Technical Achievement Award
- 2002, The Japan Society of Mechanical Engineers (JSME) Robotics and Mechatronics Division, ROBOMEC Award
- 2002, Nikkei BP Technology Award (Medical/Biotechnology division), Development of Minimally Invasive Surgery Strategy System
- 2000, The Japan Society of Mechanical Engineers (JSME), Fellow
- 2000, The Japan Society of Mechanical Engineers (JSME), JSME Medal for New Technology, "Development of Walking Support Technology for Elderly Independence"
- 2000, The Japan Society of Mechanical Engineers (JSME), Robotics and Mechatronics Division, Technical Achievement Award
- 1999, The Robotic Society of Japan (RSJ), Technical Innovations Awards, Development of Compliance Control Type Ambulation Exercise Equipment for Supporting Elderly Independent Living
- 1994, Notable Invention Award from the Science and Technology Agency Director-General, Walking Support Equipment
- 1991, Atomic Energy Society of Japan's Technology Development Award: robot for hazardous environments, Research and Development of Atomic Power Robot

== Selected papers ==
- Sekiguchi, Y.; Kobayashi, Y.; Watanabe, H.; Tomono, Y. In vivo experiments of a surgical robot with vision field control for single port endoscopic surgery. Engineering in Medicine and Biology Society, EMBC, 2011 Annual International Conference of the IEEE. Page(s): 7045 – 7048. Fujie and his co-authors proposed "a surgical endoscopic robot for SPS with dynamic vision control, the endoscopic view being manipulated by a master controller."
- Watanabe, H.; Kanou, K.; Kobayashi, Y.; Fujie, M.G. Development of a "steerable drill" for ACL reconstruction to create the arbitrary trajectory of a bone tunnel. 2011 IEEE/RSJ International Conference on Intelligent Robots and Systems. Page(s): 955 – 960. Fujie and his co-authors described their development of "a steerable drill for ACL reconstruction to avoid LCL injury in the process of making a bone tunnel".
- Seki, M.; Matsumoto, Y.; Iijima, H.; Ando, T.; et al. Development of robotic upper limb orthosis with tremor suppressibility and elbow joint movability. 2011 IEEE International Conference on Systems, Man, and Cybernetics (SMC). Page(s): 729 – 735. Fujie and his co-authors described the development of a "a myoelectric controlled exoskeletal robot to suppress tremor" as well as "a signal processing method to suppress tremor noise present in the surface EMG signal".
- Hoshi, T.; Kobayashi, Y.; Miyashita, T.; Fujie, M.G. Quantitative palpation to identify the material parameters of tissues using reactive force measurement and finite element simulation. 2010 IEEE/RSJ International Conference on Intelligent Robots and Systems. Page(s): 2822 – 2828. Fujie and his co-authors presented "a new robotic palpation method to perform quantitative measurement of the material parameters of human tissues, for use in medical applications".
- Bo Zhang; Kobayashi, Y.; Maeda, Y.; Chiba, T.; et al. Development of 6-DOF wire-driven robotic manipulator for minimally invasive fetal surgery. 2011 IEEE International Conference on Robotics and Automation (ICRA). Page(s): 2892 – 2897. Fujie and his co-authors proposed "a novel robotic manipulator for intrauterine fetal surgery for tracheal occlusion".
- Yuta Sekiguchi, Yo Kobayashi, Yu Tomono, Hiroki Watanabe, Kazutaka Toyoda, Kozo Konishi, Morimasa Tomikawa, Satoshi Ieiri, Kazuo Tanoue, Makoto Hashizume, Masakatsu G. Fujie.Development of a tool manipulator driven by a flexible shaft for Single Port Endoscopic Surgery. IEEE/RAS-EMBS International Conference on Biomedical Robotics and Biomechatronics, pp. 120–125, 2010. Fujie and his co-authors described their development of a surgical endoscopic robot that assists in Single Port Endoscopic Surgery and provides dynamic vision control.
- Sekiguchi, Y.; Kobayashi, Y.; Tomono, Y.; Watanabe, H.; et al. Development of a tool manipulator driven by a flexible shaft for Single Port Endoscopic Surgery. 3rd IEEE International Conference on Biomedical Robotics and Biomechatronics 2010. Page(s): 120 – 125. Fujie and his co-authors, describing the development of "a robotics system ... to assist in Single Port Endoscopic Surgery", proposed “a surgical endoscopic robot for SPS with dynamic vision control, the endoscopic view being manipulated by a master controller.”
- Watanabe, H.; Yamazaki, N.; Kobayashi, Y.; Miyashita, T.; et al. Temperature dependence of thermal conductivity of liver based on various experiments and a numerical simulation for RF ablation. Engineering in Medicine and Biology Society (EMBC), 2010 Annual International Conference of the IEEE. Page(s): 3222 – 3228. Fujie and his co-authors proposed "a model-based robotic ablation system using numerical simulation to analyze temperature distributions" in the liver in order to enable "precise control of the formation of coagulation zones".
- Watanabe, T.; Ohki, E.; Kobayashi, Y.; Fujie, M.G. Leg-dependent force control for body weight support by gait cycle estimation from pelvic movement. 2010 IEEE International Conference on Robotics and Automation. Page(s): 2235 – 2240. Fujie and his co-authors proposed "a novel method by which to estimate the gait cycle from pelvic movement and feed forward control for leg-dependent force control".
- Takeshi Ando, Eiichi Ohki, Yasutaka Nakashima, Yutaka Akita, Hiroshi Iijima, Osamu Tanaka, Masakatsu G. Fujie. [Paper] Split belt treadmill with differential velocity and biofeedback for well-balanced gait of patient with stroke. IEEE/RAS-EMBS International Conference on Biomedical Robotics and Biomechatronics, pp. 1–6, 2010. Fujie and his co-authors described a "split belt treadmill robot for gait rehabilitation" which "was developed to improve the symmetry of the stance phase time of patients with stroke".
- T. Watanabe, K. Kawamura, K. Harada, E. Susilo, A. Menciassi, P. Dario, M. G. Fujie. [Paper] A reconfigurable master device for a modular surgical robot and evaluation of its feasibility. IEEE/RAS-EMBS International Conference on Biomedical Robotics and Biomechatronics, pp. 114–119, 2010. Fujie and his co-authors proposed a "reconfigurable master device...for a reconfigurable modular surgical robot".
- S. Matsushita, M. G. Fujie. Algorithm for selecting appropriate self-transfer equipment based on the physical ability of the user. IEEE/RAS-EMBS International Conference on Biomedical Robotics and Biomechatronics, pp. 437–441, 2010. Fujie and his co-author proposed “an algorithm for selecting appropriate self-transfer support equipment based on the physical ability of the user” and described "the relationship between features of the human body and the physical burdens during standing." They explained the need for this algorithm by observing that while "several care support devices have been developed, assistive robots are not yet popular because users do not know which devices are suitable for their needs or appropriate for their physical abilities".
- Yo Kobayashi, Yu Tomono, Yuta Sekiguchi, Hiroki Watanabe, Kazutaka Toyoda, Kozo Konishi, Morimasa Tomikawa, Satoshi Ieiri, Kazuo Tanoue, Makoto Hashizume, Masaktsu G. Fujie. A surgical robot with vision field control for single port endoscopic surgery. Robotic end-effectors for single port endoscopic surgery (SPS) require a manual change of vision field that slows surgery and increases the degrees of freedom (DOFs) of the manipulator. The International Journal of Medical Robotics and Computer Assisted Surgery. Volume 6, Issue 4, pp. 454–464, December 2010. Fujie and his co-authors described their development of a “new surgical prototype robot” with “dynamic vision field control and a master controller to manipulate the endoscopic view.”
- Yo Kobayashia, Akinori Onishib, Hiroki Watanabeb, Takeharu Hoshib, Kazuya Kawamuraa, Makoto Hashizumec, Masakatsu G. Fujie, et al. Development of an integrated needle insertion system with image guidance and deformation simulation. Computerized Medical Imaging and Graphics. Volume 34, Issue 1, January 2010, pp. 9–18. Fujie and his co-authors described their successful development of "an integrated system with image guidance and deformation simulation for the purpose of accurate needle insertion."
- Yo Kobayashi, Akinori Onishi, Takeharu Hoshi, Kazuya Kawamura, Makoto Hashizume, Masakatsu G. Fujie. Development and validation of a viscoelastic and nonlinear liver model for needle insertion. International Journal of Computer Assisted Radiology and Surgery. January 2009, Volume 4, Issue 1, pp. 53–63. Fujie and his co-authors described their effort “to develop and validate a viscoelastic and nonlinear physical liver model for organ model-based needle insertion, in which the deformation of an organ is estimated and predicted, and the needle path is determined with organ deformation taken into consideration.”
- Watanabe, H.; Kobayashi, Y.; Hashizume, M.; Fujie, M.G. Modeling the temperature dependence of thermophysical properties: Study on the effect of temperature dependence for RFA. Engineering in Medicine and Biology Society, 2009. Annual International Conference of the IEEE. Page(s): 5100 – 5105. Fujie and his co-authors described their efforts "to develop a temperature dependent thermophysical liver model."
