= Alberto Zamot =

Puerto Rican basketball player

Alberto Zamot Bula (born 19 November 1942 in Utuado, Puerto Rico) is a Puerto Rican former basketball player who competed in the 1964 Summer Olympics and in the 1968 Summer Olympics.

== BSN career ==
Zamot played 14 seasons as a professional basketball player at the Baloncesto Superior Nacional league, all with the Vaqueros de Bayamón. He helped the Vaqueros win several national championships during the 1970s.

== See also ==
- List of Puerto Ricans
