= Óscar Sevilla (basketball) =

Peruvian basketball player (born 1942)

Personal information
- Nationality: Peruvian
- Born: 14 October 1942 (age 83)

Sport
- Sport: Basketball

Óscar Sevilla (born 14 October 1942) is a Peruvian basketball player. He competed in the men's tournament at the 1964 Summer Olympics.
