= Francisco Pérez (cyclist) =

Uruguayan cyclist (1934–2024

Personal information
- Born: 4 February 1934 Chamizo, Uruguay
- Died: 6 April 2024 (aged 90) Argentina

Cycling career
- Sport: Cycling

Francisco Pérez (4 February 1934 – 6 April 2024) was a Uruguayan cyclist. He competed in the individual road race and team time trial events at the 1964 Summer Olympics. He died on 6 April 2024, at the age of 90.
