= José Guzmán (basketball) =

Peruvian basketball player (1937–2026)

Personal information
- Born: 10 May 1937 Lima, Peru
- Died: 15 June 2026 (aged 89)

Sport
- Sport: Basketball

José Miguel Guzmán (10 May 1937 – 15 June 2026) was a Peruvian basketball player. He competed in the men's tournament at the 1964 Summer Olympics. Guzmán died on 15 June 2026, at the age of 89.
