= Gonçalo Duarte (footballer, born 1998) =

Portuguese footballer

Personal information
- Full name: Gonçalo Duarte Amaral Sousa
- Date of birth: 19 April 1998 (age 28)
- Place of birth: Viseu, Portugal
- Height: 1.69 m (5 ft 7 in)
- Position: Midfielder

Team information
- Current team: Olhanense
- Number: 19

Youth career
- 2007–2008: Dínamo Estação
- 2008–2016: Académico Viseu
- 2016: Tondela
- 2016–2017: Académico Viseu

Senior career*
Years	Team	Apps	(Gls)
2017–2019	Académico Viseu	2	(0)
2019–	Olhanense	5	(0)
- * Club domestic league appearances and goals as of 19:56, 19 January 2020 (UTC)

Gonçalo Duarte Amaral Sousa (born 19 April 1998) is a Portuguese professional footballer who plays for S.C. Olhanense as a midfielder.

== Career ==
On 12 May 2018, Duarte made his professional debut with Académico Viseu in a 2017–18 LigaPro match against Santa Clara.
