= Joaquín Enseñat =

Spanish basketball player

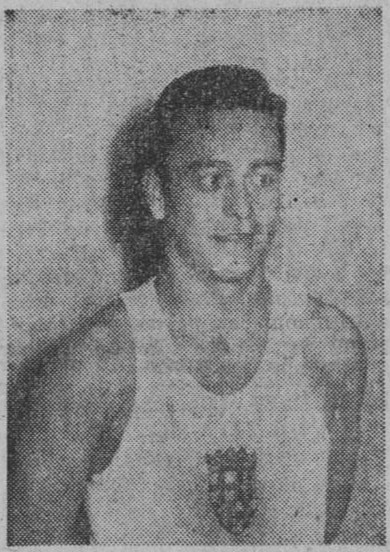

Personal information
- Nationality: Spanish
- Born: 22 January 1938 (age 87); Barcelona, Spain

Sport
- Sport: Basketball

Joaquín Enseñat (born 22 January 1938) is a Spanish basketball player. He competed in the men's tournament at the 1960 Summer Olympics.
