= Kim Jong-seon =

South Korean basketball player

Personal information
- Nationality: South Korean
- Born: 30 July 1939 (age 85)

Sport
- Sport: Basketball

Kim Jong-seon (born 30 July 1939) is a South Korean basketball player. He competed in the men's tournament at the 1964 Summer Olympics.
