= Johnny Rodríguez (basketball) =

Puerto Rican basketball player

Johnny Rodríguez (born 16 May 1940 in San Juan, Puerto Rico) is a Puerto Rican former basketball player who competed in the 1960 Summer Olympics.
