= Bohuslav Rylich =

Czech basketball player (1934–2020)

Personal information
- Nationality: Czech
- Born: 5 May 1934; Nymburk, Czechoslovakia
- Died: July 2020 (aged 86)

Sport
- Sport: Basketball

Bohuslav Rylich (5 May 1934 – July 2020) was a Czech basketball player. He competed in the men's tournament at the 1960 Summer Olympics.
