= Jorge Guillén (basketball) =

Spanish basketball player (1937–2023)

Personal information
- Nationality: Spanish
- Born: 13 January 1937; Jerez de la Frontera, Spain
- Died: 16 October 2023 (aged 86); Barcelona, Spain

Sport
- Sport: Basketball

Jorge Guillén (13 January 1937 – 16 October 2023) was a Spanish basketball player. He competed in the men's tournament at the 1960 Summer Olympics.

Jorge Guillén died in Barcelona on 16 October 2023, at the age of 86.
