= Fujie Sakamoto =

Japanese nurse and midwife (1924–2021)

- Born: 13 January 1924; Kiyokawa, Wakayama Prefecture, Empire of Japan
- Died: 12 February 2021 (aged 97)
- Occupations: Nurse; Midwife

Fujie Sakamoto (Japanese: 坂本フジヱ Sakamoto Fujie; 13 January 1924 – 12 February 2021) was a Japanese nurse and midwife.

== Biography ==
Sakamoto was heavily involved during World War II and helped rescue more than 4000 children. Shortly before the war, she earned her degrees and licenses in Osaka, and returned to her parents' village of Tanabe shortly afterward. She then began working for the National Health Insurance. In 1999, she was awarded a yellow ribbon for her career services. At the time of her death, she was the oldest nurse to have served in Japan.

Fujie Sakamoto died on 12 February 2021 at the age of 97.

== Book ==
- 大丈夫やで : ばあちゃん助産師 (せんせい) のお産と育児のはなし (2011)
