= Mariano Ortiz =

Puerto Rican basketball player (1944–2022)

Mariano Ortiz Marrero (25 July 1944 – 16 April 2022) was a Puerto Rican basketball player who competed in the 1968 Summer Olympics, in the 1972 Summer Olympics, and in the 1976 Summer Olympics. Ortiz was born in Toa Baja on 25 July 1944. He died on 16 April 2022, at the age of 77.

== Honours ==
Puerto Rico

- Pan American Games runner-up: 1971, 1975
