= Edward, Duke of Guimarães =

Edward, Duke of Guimarães may refer to:

- Duarte, Duke of Guimarães (1515–1540), son of King Manuel I of Portugal and Maria of Aragon, married Isabel of Braganza.
- Duarte, Duke of Guimarães (1541–1576), son of the previous and his wife, Isabel of Braganza, never married.
