= José Duarte =

José Duarte is the name of:

- José Duarte (footballer) (born 1980), Brazilian footballer
- José Napoleón Duarte (1925–1990), Salvadoran political figure
- José Duarte (football manager) (1935–2004), Brazilian football manager
