= Gayle Bluth =

Mexican basketball player (1925–2013)

Personal information
- Born: 19 April 1925 Colonia Dublán, Mexico
- Died: 19 January 2013 (aged 87) New Mexico, United States

Sport
- Sport: Basketball

Gayle Bluth (19 April 1925 – 19 January 2013) was a Mexican basketball player. He competed in the men's tournament at the 1960 Summer Olympics. Bluth was also a member of the Church of Jesus Christ of Latter-day Saints, and served in the United States Navy on board a submarine.

Bluth served as president of the Argentina Bahia Blanca Mission of The Church of Jesus Christ of Latter-day Saints beginning in 1989, a position in which he succeeded Agricol Lozano.
