= Mídia Ninja =

- Format: News portal
- Founder: Fora do Eixo
- Founded: March 2013
- Political alignment: Left
- Language: Portuguese
- Country: Brazil
- Website: midianinja.org

Mídia Ninja (Note: "Ninja" is an acronym for "Narrativas Independentes, Jornalismo e Ação" (in English: Independent Narratives, Journalism and Action)) (lit. 'Ninja Media') is a Brazilian media network and news portal aligned with the political left. Its approach is known for its socio-political and identity-based activism, declaring itself to be an alternative to the traditional press. The group gained international attention for its coverage of the 2013 protests in the country.

Currently, in addition to live video streaming, the network has a news portal. Mídia Ninja's structure utilizes social media platforms such as Facebook, X, Flickr, Tumblr, and Instagram to disseminate news.

== History ==
The group originated in June 2011 through Pós-TV, a digital media outlet within the Fora do Eixo circuit, a cultural production network originating from the Pontos de Cultura program, and went on to develop communication and cultural production technologies, as well as acting as a social movement in constant collaboration with other groups, collectives, and social movements. Journalists Bruno Torturra and Debora Pill are considered the founders of Mídia Ninja, which began as an independent journalism collective, named by her as the Independent Journalism and Action Nucleus. Later, it included participants from the Fora do Eixo Network: Rafael Vilela, Felipe Altenfelder, Dríade Aguiar, Pablo Capilé, Filipe Peçanha, and Thiago Dezan.

In 2012, the group covered the situation of the Guarani-Kaiowá villages in Mato Grosso do Sul. The group was also present at the Global Marijuana March and the Freedom March of 2013.

The network was officially launched in March 2013 with coverage of the World Free Media Forum in Tunisia. It then gained wide visibility during the June and July 2013 protests in Brazil. After live-streaming the protests and influencing the narrative of traditional media, gaining hundreds of thousands of followers on its social media accounts, the group has adopted a constant collaborative approach with Brazilian social movements.

In July of the same year, during Pope Francis' visit to Brazil, two members of Mídia Ninja were arrested in Rio de Janeiro.

Since Bruno Torturra and Pablo Capilé's participation in the Roda Viva program on TV Cultura on August 5, 2013, to discuss their experience with Mídia Ninja, the Fora do Eixo network has been the target of attacks from some former members and artists linked to the group's events. They were denounced by Veja magazine, which used filmmaker Beatriz Seigner's testimony to accuse the group of withholding fees and exploitative work practices. One of the main criticisms pointed out that the network was more interested in its own self-promotion than in strengthening the independent scene. One of the founders of Fora do Eixo, Pablo Capilé, publicly defended himself against the accusations.

In 2016 and 2017, journalist Bruno Garschagen stated that the group received external funding, such as from the Open Society Foundations and investor George Soros, and questioned whether this contradicted the group's claims of "independent media."

In March 2025, Estadão revealed that Mídia Ninja has been using NGOs to receive funds from the federal government, even though it claims not to be financed by public funds. Two entities directly linked to the group, and whose representatives work in the Ministry of Culture, obtained R$ 4 million in agreements, parliamentary amendments, and incentive laws during Lula's third term alone.

== Photojournalism ==
The group also works in the field of photography, especially photojournalism, having participated in the Offside Brazil project in February 2014, with the Magnum Photography Agency, founded by, among others, the photographer Henri Cartier-Bresson.

The network has a policy of using collective authorship for most of its content, which is made available under the Creative Commons license with commercial restrictions.

In 2014, the São Paulo Museum of Modern Art, through its Photography Collectors Club, selected a set of photographs produced by the network to be part of its collection.
