= Jorge Vargas (basketball) =

Peruvian basketball player

Personal information
- Born: 4 July 1942 (age 82); Lima, Peru

Sport
- Sport: Basketball

Jorge Leonardo Vargas Kerrigan (born 4 July 1942) is a Peruvian basketball player. He competed in the men's tournament at the 1964 Summer Olympics.
