= Daniel Duarte =

Daniel Duarte may refer to:

- Daniel Duarte (Gibraltarian footballer) (born 1979), Gibraltarian football midfielder
- Daniel Duarte (Mexican footballer) (born 1985), Mexican football defender
- Daniel Duarte (baseball) (born 1996), Mexican baseball player
- Daniel Duarte Ferreira (born 1982), Brazilian politician
