= Luis García (basketball player) =

Uruguayan basketball player (born 1941)

Personal information
- Nationality: Uruguayan
- Born: 21 June 1941 (age 84)

Sport
- Sport: Basketball

Luis Agustín García Guido (born 21 June 1941) is a Uruguayan basketball player. He competed in the men's tournament at the 1964 Summer Olympics.
