= Evelio Droz =

Puerto Rican basketball player (1937–2025)

Personal information
- Born: May 10, 1937 San Juan, Puerto Rico
- Died: July 26, 2025 (aged 88)
- Listed height: 6 ft 3 in (1.91 m)
- Listed weight: 176 lb (80 kg)

Career information
- Playing career: 1957–1970
- Position: Forward

Career history
- 1957–1970: Vaqueros de Bayamón

Evelio Droz Ramos (Spanish: [eˈβeljo ˈðɾos ˈramos]; May 10, 1937 – July 26, 2025) was a Puerto Rican basketball player. He played 14 seasons in the Baloncesto Superior Nacional (BSN) for the Vaqueros de Bayamón, helping the team win two championships. As a member of the Puerto Rico men's national basketball team, he competed at the 1960 Summer Olympics and the 1964 Summer Olympics, also winning medals at the 1959 and 1966 Central American and Caribbean Games, as well as the 1959 and 1963 Pan American Games.

== Biography ==
Droz was born on May 10, 1937, in San Juan, Puerto Rico. He grew up in the town of Barranquitas. Standing at 6 feet 3 inches (1.91 m) and weighing 176 pounds (80 kg), he played basketball as a forward and was known for his rebounding and scoring abilities. He was nicknamed "El Potro" (The Colt) and played in Puerto Rico for the Vaqueros de Bayamón in the Baloncesto Superior Nacional (BSN), the first-tier league in the country. Droz spent his entire 14-season professional basketball playing career, which spanned from 1957 to 1970, with the Vaqueros.

Droz led the league in scoring during the 1959 season with 409 points in 21 games, an average of 19.5 per game. He had one of the best games of his career in 1960 against the Piratas de Quebradillas, recording 44 points. He was considered one of the team's "pillars" during the 1960s, where they began a streak of eight finals appearances in nine seasons from 1967 to 1975. He was a key player on the 1967 and 1969 BSN championship teams and in his final season, 1970, he reached a third league finals, losing to the Piratas. In his professional career, Droz appeared in 260 games and scored 3,987 points, averaging 14.8 points per game. He also averaged 2.9 rebounds over his career.

Droz played several years with the Puerto Rico men's national basketball team, making up "part of the heart of the team" according to Paquito Rodríguez, director of the Puerto Rican Basketball Federation. He was part of a team that won the bronze medal at the 1959 Central American and Caribbean Games in Caracas, Venezuela, then won silver at the 1959 Pan American Games in Chicago. The following year, he was selected to represent Puerto Rico in basketball at the 1960 Summer Olympics in Rome, the first time Puerto Rico competed in basketball at the Olympics. At the Olympics, the team finished 13th. In 1963, Droz competed at the FIBA World Championship and won the bronze medal at the 1963 Pan American Games in São Paulo. He returned to the Olympics in 1964 in Tokyo, helping his team finish fourth. Two years later, he contributed to the gold-medal winning team at the 1966 Central American and Caribbean Games, held in San Juan.

After his playing career, Droz served on the board of directors for the Puerto Rican Basketball Federation. He was inducted into the Puerto Rican Sports Hall of Fame in 1997. He died on July 26, 2025, at the age of 88.
