= Walter Márquez =

Uruguayan basketball player

Walter Márquez Busto (28 October 1936 – 3 August 2012) was a Uruguayan former basketball player who competed in the 1964 Summer Olympics.
