= Keith Hartley =

Canadian basketball player

Personal information
- Born: 15 October 1940 (age 85) Vancouver, British Columbia, Canada
- Listed height: 6 ft 7 in (2.01 m)

Career information
- High school: Lord Byng
- College: UBC (1959–1963)
- Position: Forward / Center

Keith Chapman Hartley (born 15 October 1940) is a Canadian basketball player. He competed in the men's tournament at the 1964 Summer Olympics.

Hartley played college basketball for the University of British Columbia.
