= Luis Koster =

Uruguayan basketball player (1942–2021)

Personal information
- Born: 24 March 1942; Soriano, Uruguay
- Died: 14 November 2021 (aged 79); Ciudad de la Costa, Uruguay

Sport
- Sport: Basketball

Luis Eduardo Koster Peña (24 March 1942 – 14 November 2021) was a Uruguayan basketball player. He competed in the men's tournament at the 1964 Summer Olympics. He died on 14 November 2021, at the age of 79.
