= Luis Duarte =

Peruvian basketball player

Personal information
- Born: 10 April 1941; Piura, Peru
- Died: 3 September 2017 (aged 76); Lima, Peru

Sport
- Sport: Basketball

Fernando Luis Duarte Mungi (10 April 1941 – 3 September 2017) was a Peruvian basketball player. He competed in the men's tournament at the 1964 Summer Olympics. Duarte's brothers, Enrique, Raúl, and Ricardo were also professional basketball players. All four of them were during the 1964 Olympics.
