= Kim Seung-gyu (basketball) =

South Korean basketball player

Personal information
- Nationality: South Korean
- Born: 19 January 1943 (age 82)

Sport
- Sport: Basketball

Kim Seung-gyu (born 19 January 1943) is a South Korean basketball player. He competed in the men's tournament at the 1964 Summer Olympics.
