= Ramiro de León (basketball) =

Uruguayan basketball player

Ramiro Eduardo de León Ibarra (18 March 1938 – 11 August 2007) was a Uruguayan basketball player who competed in the 1964 Summer Olympics.
