= Enrique Duarte =

Peruvian basketball player

Personal information
- Born: 26 May 1938 Jauja, Peru
- Died: 15 April 2025 (aged 86)

Sport
- Sport: Basketball

Enrique Duarte Mungi (26 May 1938 – 15 April 2025) was a Peruvian basketball player. He competed in the men's tournament at the 1964 Summer Olympics. Duarte's brothers, Luis, Raúl, and Ricardo were also professional basketball players. All four of them were during the 1964 Olympics.
