= Raúl Duarte (basketball, born 1944) =

Peruvian basketball player

Personal information
- Born: 11 November 1944 (age 82) Piura, Peru
- Listed height: 6 ft 8 in (2.03 m)
- Listed weight: 201 lb (91 kg)

Career information
- College: Iowa State (1965–1967); South Dakota State (1968–1969)
- NBA draft: 1969: 12th round, 160th overall pick
- Drafted by: San Diego Rockets
- Position: Forward
- Stats at Basketball Reference

Raúl Duarte Mungi (born 11 November 1944) is a Peruvian basketball player. He competed in the men's tournament at the 1964 Summer Olympics. Duarte's brothers, Enrique, Luis, and Ricardo were also professional basketball players. All four of them were during the 1964 Olympics.

Duarte played college basketball in the United States for Iowa State and South Dakota State. He was selected in the 1969 NBA draft by the San Diego Rockets but never appeared in an NBA game.
