= Alvaro Roca =

Uruguayan basketball player

Personal information
- Nationality: Uruguayan
- Born: 16 October 1939
- Died: 16 April 2026 (aged 86)

Sport
- Sport: Basketball

Alvaro Eduardo Roca Despeyroux (16 October 1939 – 16 April 2026) was a Uruguayan basketball player. He competed in the men's tournament at the 1964 Summer Olympics.
