= Rolly Goldring =

Canadian basketball player

Personal information
- Born: 14 April 1937; Stouffville, Ontario, Canada
- Died: 31 October 2017 (aged 80)

Sport
- Sport: Basketball

Rollit James Goldring (14 April 1937 – 31 October 2017) was a Canadian basketball player. He competed in the men's tournament at the 1964 Summer Olympics.
