= Julio César Gómez =

Uruguayan basketball player (1940–2022)

Julio César Gómez Matteo (8 November 1940 – 2 August 2022) was a Uruguayan basketball player who competed in the 1964 Summer Olympics. He died in Montevideo on 2 August 2022, at the age of 81.
