= James Maguire (basketball) =

Canadian basketball player

Personal information
- Born: 28 September 1939 (age 85); Weston, Ontario, Canada

Sport
- Sport: Basketball

James Maguire (born 28 September 1939) is a Canadian basketball player. He competed in the men's tournament at the 1964 Summer Olympics.
