= Eulalio Avila =

Mexican basketball player (born 1941)

Personal information
- Born: 8 September 1941 (age 83); Ciudad Juárez, Mexico

Sport
- Sport: Basketball

Eulalio Avila (born 8 September 1941) is a Mexican basketball player. He competed in the men's tournament at the 1960 Summer Olympics and the 1964 Summer Olympics.
