= Katsuo Bai =

Japanese basketball player (born 1940)

Personal information
- Nationality: Japanese
- Born: 29 November 1940 (age 84)

Sport
- Sport: Basketball

Katsuo Bai (梅 勝夫, Bai Katsuo, born 29 November 1940) is a Japanese basketball player. He competed in the men's tournament at the 1964 Summer Olympics.
