= John Moráles =

Puerto Rican basketball player

Personal information
- Nationality: Puerto Rican
- Born: 24 February 1939 (age 86); New York City, United States

Sport
- Sport: Basketball

John Moráles (born 24 February 1939) is a Puerto Rican former basketball player. He competed in the men's tournament at the 1960 Summer Olympics.
