= Sergio Pisano =

Uruguayan basketball player

Sergio Pisano Pereira (13 June 1941 – 17 July 2017) was a Uruguayan basketball player who competed in the 1964 Summer Olympics.
