= Guillermo Torres (basketball) =

Mexican basketball player (born 1937)

Personal information
- Born: 16 December 1937 (age 87); Chihuahua, Mexico

Sport
- Sport: Basketball

Guillermo Torres (born 16 December 1937) is a Mexican basketball player. He competed in the men's tournament at the 1960 Summer Olympics.
