= Walter Birtles =

Canadian basketball player (1937–2024)

Walter Allan Birtles
Personal information
- Nationality: Canadian
- Born: April 16, 1937 Carbon, Alberta
- Died: September 14, 2024 (aged 87) North Vancouver (city)

Sport
- Sport: Basketball

Walter Birtles (April 16, 1937 – September 14, 2024) was a Canadian basketball player. He competed in the men's tournament at the 1964 Summer Olympics.
