= Seiji Fujie =

Japanese basketball player (born 1941)

Personal information
- Nationality: Japanese
- Born: 15 June 1941 (age 83)

Sport
- Sport: Basketball

Seiji Fujie (藤江 精二, Fujie Seiji, born 15 June 1941) is a Japanese basketball player. He competed in the men's tournament at the 1964 Summer Olympics.
