= Ignacio Chavira =

Mexican basketball player (born 1936)

Personal information
- Born: 26 June 1936 Ojinaga, Mexico
- Died: May 1994 (aged 57)

Sport
- Sport: Basketball

Ignacio Chavira (26 June 1936 – May 1994) was a Mexican basketball player. He competed in the men's tournament at the 1960 Summer Olympics.
