= César Herrera (basketball) =

Mexican basketball player

Personal information
- Full name: César Octavio Herrera Rodríguez
- Nationality: Mexican
- Born: 5 October 1930; Ciudad Juárez, Mexico

Sport
- Sport: Basketball

César Herrera Rodríguez (born 5 October 1930) is a Mexican basketball player. He competed in the men's tournament at the 1960 Summer Olympics.
