= Katsuji Tsunoda =

Japanese basketball player

Personal information
- Nationality: Japanese
- Born: 28 September 1943; Higashiagatsuma, Japan
- Died: 14 February 2011 (aged 67)

Sport
- Sport: Basketball

Katsuji Tsunoda (角田 勝次, Tsunoda Katsuji, 28 September 1943 – 14 February 2011) was a Japanese basketball player. He competed in the men's tournament at the 1964 Summer Olympics.
