= Joseph Stulac =

Canadian basketball player

Personal information
- Born: 6 March 1935; Etobicoke, Ontario, Canada
- Died: 7 July 2001 (aged 66)

Sport
- Sport: Basketball

Joseph Stulac (6 March 1935 – 10 July 2001) was a Canadian basketball player. He competed in the men's tournament at the 1964 Summer Olympics.
