= Armando Herrera (basketball) =

Mexican basketball player (1931–2020)

Personal information
- Full name: Armando Herrera Montoya
- Born: 6 January 1931; Chihuahua, Mexico
- Died: 14 October 2020 (aged 89); Mexico City, Mexico

Sport
- Sport: Basketball

Armando Herrera Montoya (6 January 1931 – 14 October 2020) was a Mexican basketball player. He competed in the men's tournament at the 1960 Summer Olympics and the 1964 Summer Olympics.

Armando Herrera died on 14 October 2020 at the age of 84.
