= Waldemar Rial =

Uruguayan basketball player (1940–2019)

Waldemar José Rial Ferrari (3 February 1940 – 15 September 2019) was a Uruguayan basketball player who competed in the 1960 Summer Olympics and in the 1964 Summer Olympics. He was born in Paso de los Toros, Tacuarembó Department. He twice presided over Club Atlético Goes.
