= Edison Ciavattone =

Uruguayan basketball player

Edison Antonio Ciavattone Sampérez (born 20 September 1938 in Montevideo) is a Uruguayan basketball player who competed in the 1960 Summer Olympics and 1964 Summer Olympics.
