= Manuel Gadea =

Uruguayan basketball player (born 1942)

Manuel Roberto Gadea (born 2 January 1942) is a Uruguayan basketball player who competed in the 1960 Summer Olympics and in the 1964 Summer Olympics. He was born in Montevideo.
