= FIBA Basketball World Cup records =

FIBA Basketball World Cup records are the records attained throughout the history of the FIBA Basketball World Cup.

== General performances ==
=== Performances of host countries ===
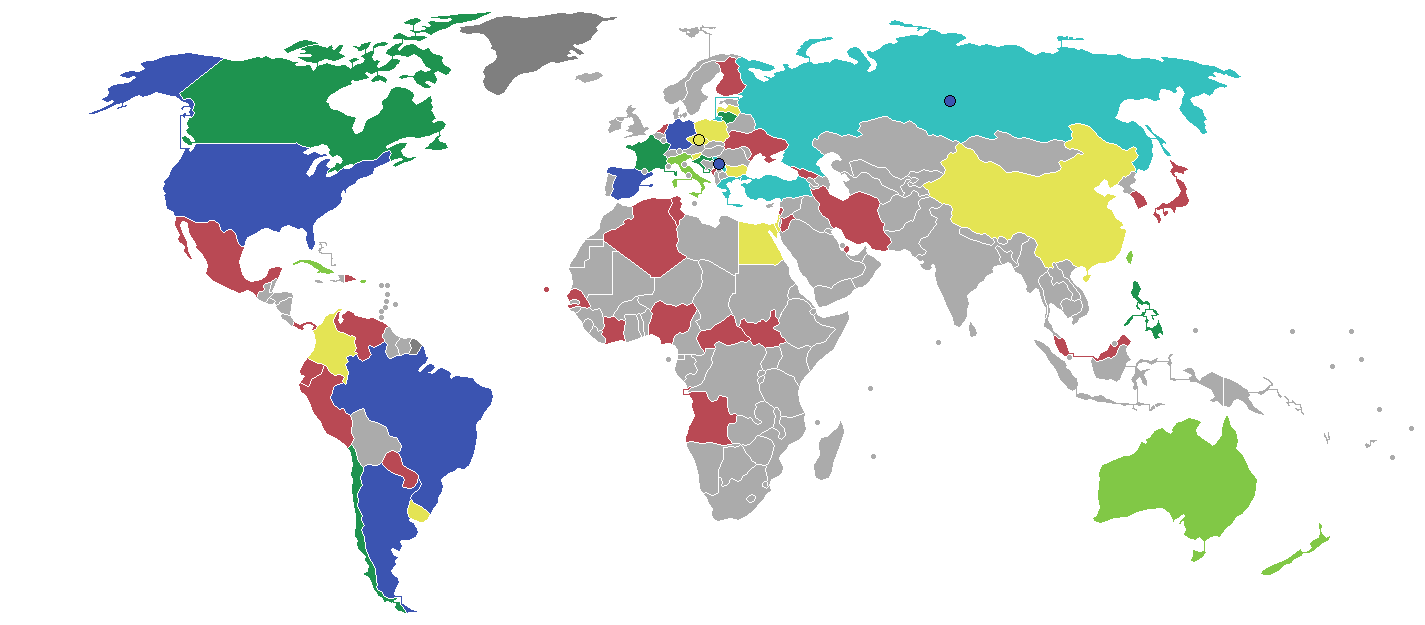
Map of countries' best results

From 1959 to 1982, the host qualified directly to the final round, thus bypassing the preliminary round (group stages). As a result, the host's final rank would no worse than the number of teams in the final round (between six and eight); however, from 1986 the host was made to compete in the preliminary round.

However, the success rate of hosts winning the tournament is rather low (14%, 3 of 18), as compared to the FIFA World Cup's success rate of 22% (6 of 21); furthermore, no host has won the championship since Yugoslavia won in 1970, and only one host since then has won any type of medal (Turkey with a silver medal in 2010).

Year	Host country	When hosting		Better when hosting?	When not hosting	
Year	Host country	Performance	Stage	Better when hosting?	Performance	Stage
1950	Argentina	Champions	Final round (1st of 6)	Yes	Runner-up	Final
1954	Brazil	Runner-up	Final round (2nd of 8)	No	Champions	Final round (1st of 7)
1959	Chile	Third place	Final round (3rd of 7)	No	Third place	Final round (3rd of 6)
1963	Brazil	Champions	Final round (1st of 7)	No	Champions	Final round (1st of 7)
1967	Uruguay	Seventh place	Final round (7th of 7)	No	Third place	Final round (3rd of 7)
1970	Yugoslavia	Champions	Final round (1st of 7)	No	Champions	Final
1974	Puerto Rico	Seventh place	Final round (7th of 8)	No	Fourth place	Semifinals
1978	Philippines	Eighth place	Final round (8th of 8)	No	Third place	Final round (3rd of 7)
1982	Colombia	Seventh place	Final round (7th of 7)	Not applicable — only appearance is when they hosted		
1986	Spain	Fifth place	5th-place playoffs	No	Champions	Final
1990	Argentina	Eighth place	Second round (4th of 4)	No	Runner-up	Final
1994	Canada	Seventh place	5th-place playoffs	No	Third place	Final round (3rd of 8)
1998	Greece	Fourth place	Semifinals	No	Runner-up	Final
2002	United States	Sixth place	Quarterfinals	No	Champions	Final
2006	Japan	Seventeenth place	Preliminary round (5th of 6)	No	11th place	Classification round (4th of 6)
2010	Turkey	Runner-up	Final	Yes	Sixth place	Quarterfinals
2014	Spain	Fifth place	Quarterfinals	No	Champions	Final
2019	China	Twenty-fourth place	Preliminary round (3rd of 4)	No	Eighth place	7th place classification game
2023	Philippines	Twenty-fourth place	Preliminary round (4th of 4)	No	Third place	Final round (3rd of 7)
2023	Indonesia	Non-participating host		—N/a	Never qualified	
2023	Japan	Nineteenth place	Preliminary round (3rd of 4)	No	Eleventh place	Classification round (4th of 6)
2027	Qatar				Twenty-first place	Preliminary round (6th of 6)

=== By top four finishes ===
Rank	Nation	Number of appearances	Years in semifinals
1.	United States	15	(1950, 1954, 1959, 1963, 1967, 1974, 1982, 1986, 1990, 1994, 1998, 2006, 2010, 2014, 2023)
2.	Yugoslavia / FR Yugoslavia (Serbia and Montenegro)	10	(1963, 1967, 1970, 1974, 1978, 1982, 1986, 1990, 1998, 2002)
3.	Brazil	8	(1950, 1954, 1959, 1963, 1967, 1970, 1978, 1986)
3.	Soviet Union	8	(1963, 1967, 1970, 1974, 1978, 1982, 1986, 1990)
5.	Argentina	4	(1950, 2002, 2006, 2019)
6.	France	3	(1954, 2014, 2019)
6.	Greece	3	(1994, 1998, 2006)
6.	Spain	3	(1982, 2006, 2019)
6.	Serbia	3	(2010, 2014, 2023)
9.	Chile	2	(1950, 1959)
9.	Italy	2	(1970, 1978)
9.	Lithuania	2	(2010, 2014)
9.	Russia	2	(1994, 1998)
9.	Germany	2	(2002, 2023)
14.	Philippines	1	(1954)
14.	Formosa	1	(1959)
14.	Cuba	1	(1974)
14.	Puerto Rico	1	(1990)
14.	Croatia	1	(1994)
14.	New Zealand	1	(2002)
14.	Turkey	1	(2010)
14.	Australia	1	(2019)
14.	Canada	1	(2023)

== Most Valuable Players ==
Year	MVP	National Team
1950	(Argentina) Oscar Furlong	Argentina
1954	(United States) Kirby Minter	United States
1959	(Brazil) Amaury Pasos	Brazil
1963	(Brazil) Wlamir Marques	Brazil
1967	(Socialist Federal Republic of Yugoslavia) Ivo Daneu	Yugoslavia
1970	(Soviet Union) Sergei Belov	Soviet Union
1974	(Socialist Federal Republic of Yugoslavia) Dragan Kićanović	Yugoslavia
1978	(Socialist Federal Republic of Yugoslavia) Dražen Dalipagić	Yugoslavia
1982	(Panama) Rolando Frazer	Panama
1986	(Socialist Federal Republic of Yugoslavia) Dražen Petrović	Yugoslavia
1990	(Socialist Federal Republic of Yugoslavia) Toni Kukoč	Yugoslavia
1994	(United States) Shaquille O'Neal	United States
1998	(Federal Republic of Yugoslavia) Dejan Bodiroga	(Federal Republic of Yugoslavia) FR Yugoslavia
2002	(Germany) Dirk Nowitzki	Germany
2006	(Spain) Pau Gasol	Spain
2010	(United States) Kevin Durant	United States
2014	(United States) Kyrie Irving	United States
2019	(Spain) Ricky Rubio	Spain
2023	(Germany) Dennis Schröder	Germany

== Top scorer by tournament ==
=== Points per game ===
Year	Player	Scoring Average
1950	(Spain) Álvaro Salvadores	13.8
1954	(Uruguay) Oscar Moglia	18.7
1959	(Taiwan) James T. L. Chen	20.1
1963	(Peru) Ricardo Duarte	23.1
1967	(Poland) Mieczysław Łopatka	19.7
1970	(South Korea) Shin Dong-pa	32.6
1974	(Mexico) Arturo Guerrero	27.0
1978	(Czechoslovakia) Kamil Brabenec	26.9
1982	(Panama) Rolando Frazer	24.4
1986	(Greece) Nikos Galis	33.7
1990	(Brazil) Oscar Schmidt	34.6
1994	(Australia) Andrew Gaze	23.9
1998	(Spain) Alberto Herreros	17.9
2002	(Germany) Dirk Nowitzki	24.0
2006	(China) Yao Ming	25.3
2010	(Argentina) Luis Scola	27.1
2014	(Puerto Rico) J. J. Barea	22.0
2019	(South Korea) Ra Gun-ah	23.0
2023	(Slovenia) Luka Dončić	27.0

=== Total points scored ===
Year	Player	Total points scored
1950	(Chile) Rufino Bernedo	86
1954	(Uruguay) Oscar Moglia	168
1959	(United States) Jerry Vayda	162
1963	(Peru) Ricardo Duarte	163
1967	(Poland) Bohdan Likszo	180
1970	(South Korea) Shin Dong-pa	261
1974	(Spain) Wayne Brabender	207
1978	(Socialist Federal Republic of Yugoslavia) Dražen Dalipagić	202
1982	(Socialist Federal Republic of Yugoslavia) Dragan Kićanović	190
1986	(Greece) Nikos Galis	337
1986	(Brazil) Oscar Schmidt	281
1990	(Brazil) Oscar Schmidt	277
1994	(Australia) Andrew Gaze	191
1998	(Spain) Alberto Herreros	161
2002	(Germany) Dirk Nowitzki	216
2006	(Germany) Dirk Nowitzki	209
2010	(Argentina) Luis Scola	244
2014	(Spain) Pau Gasol	140
2019	(Serbia) Bogdan Bogdanović	183
2023	(Slovenia) Luka Dončić	216

== All-time top cumulative points scorers ==
#	Player	Games Played	Points Scored	Scoring Average
1.	(Brazil) Oscar Schmidt	34	906	26.7
2.	(Argentina) Luis Scola	41	716	17.5
3.	(Australia) Andrew Gaze	29	594	20.5
4.	(Socialist Federal Republic of Yugoslavia) Dražen Dalipagić	35	563	16.1
5.	(Puerto Rico) José Rafael Ortiz	33	511	15.5
6.	(Brazil) Marcel De Souza	37	494	13.6
7.	(Socialist Federal Republic of Yugoslavia) Dragan Kićanović	25	491	19.7
8.	(Spain) Pau Gasol	24	482	20.1
9.	(Brazil) Ubiratan Pereira Maciel	41	474	11.6
10.	(Greece) Panagiotis Giannakis	26	469	18.0
11.	(Spain) Juan Carlos Navarro	33	462	14.0
12.	(New Zealand) Kirk Penney	27	447	16.6
13.	(Serbia) Bogdan Bogdanović	25	444	17.8
14.	(Brazil) Wlamir Marques	31	437	10.7
15.	(Brazil) Amaury Pasos	33	434	13.2
15.	(Italy) Antonello Riva	18	434	24.1

== All time highest scoring averages ==
#	Player	Games Played	Points Scored	Scoring Average
1.	(Greece) Nikos Galis	10	337	33.7
2.	(South Korea) Shin Dong-pa	8	261	32.6
3.	(Slovenia) Luka Dončić	8	216	27.0
4.	(Brazil) Oscar Schmidt	34	906	26.7
5.	(China) Zhang Weiping	7	177	25.3
6.	(Australia) Ed Palubinskas	7	172	24.6
7.	(Italy) Antonello Riva	18	434	24.1
8.	(Germany) Dirk Nowitzki	18	425	23.6
9.	(Uruguay) Wilfredo Ruiz Bruno	7	164	23.4
10.	(South Korea) Ra Gun-ah	5	115	23.0

- Player must have played at least 5 games to appear in this statistic

== Games with most overtimes ==
Year	Round	Rivals	Extra Periods	Ref.
2006	Preliminary Round	Angola 103–108 Germany	3	
2019	Semi-finals	Spain 95–88 Australia	2	
1970	Preliminary Round	Brazil 94–93 Italy	2	
2002	Eighth-Final Round	Puerto Rico 89–87 Angola	2	
2010	Preliminary Round	Serbia 81–82 Germany	2	
1967	Classification Round	Puerto Rico 79–86 Japan	2	
1950	Classification Round	Yugoslavia 43–46 Peru	2	

== Age records ==
=== Oldest ===
#	Player	Year	Birthdate	Age *
1.	(Angola) Eduardo Mingas	(China) 2019	29 January 1979 (age 47)	40 years, 214 days
2.	(Brazil) Marcelo Huertas	(Philippines) / (Japan) / (Indonesia) 2023	25 May 1983 (age 43)	40 years, 92 days
3.	(Jordan) Zaid Abbas	(Philippines) / (Japan) / (Indonesia) 2023	21 November 1983 (age 42)	39 years, 277 days
4.	(Brazil) Alex Garcia	(China) 2019	4 March 1980 (age 46)	39 years, 180 days
5.	(Brazil) Marcelinho Machado	(Spain) 2014	12 April 1975 (age 51)	39 years, 140 days
6.	(Argentina) Luis Scola	(China) 2019	30 April 1980 (age 46)	39 years, 123 days
7.	(Cape Verde) Fidel Mendonça	(Philippines) / (Japan) / (Indonesia) 2023	7 July 1984 (age 42)	39 years, 49 days
8.	(Puerto Rico) José Rafael Ortiz	(United States) 2002	25 October 1963 (age 62)	38 years, 308 days
9.	(South Korea) Moon Tae-jong	(Spain) 2014	1 December 1975 (age 50)	38 years, 272 days
10.	(Angola) Miguel Lutonda	(Turkey) 2010	24 December 1971 (age 54)	38 years, 247 days
11.	(Cape Verde) João Gomes	(Philippines) / (Japan) / (Indonesia) 2023	5 February 1985 (age 41)	38 years, 201 days
12.	(Venezuela) Víctor David Díaz	(Japan) 2006	4 February 1968 (age 58)	38 years, 196 days
13.	(Ivory Coast) Mohamed Koné	(China) 2019	24 March 1981 (age 45)	38 years, 160 days
14.	(Angola) Reggie Moore	(China) 2019	31 March 1981 (age 45)	38 years, 153 days
15.	(Spain) Rudy Fernández	(Philippines) / (Japan) / (Indonesia) 2023	4 April 1985 (age 41)	38 years, 143 days
16.	(Iran) Hamed Haddadi	(Philippines) / (Japan) / (Indonesia) 2023	19 May 1985 (age 41)	38 years, 98 days
17.	(Puerto Rico) Daniel Santiago	(Spain) 2014	24 June 1976 (age 50)	38 years, 67 days

=== Youngest ===
#	Player	Year	Birthdate	Age *
1.	(Ivory Coast) Georges Lath	(Spain) 1986	15 April 1970 (age 56)	16 years, 81 days
2.	(China) Guo Ailun	(Turkey) 2010	14 November 1993 (age 32)	16 years, 287 days
3.	(South Sudan) Khaman Maluach	(Philippines) / (Japan) / (Indonesia) 2023	14 September 2006 (age 20)	16 years, 345 days
4.	(Angola) David Dias	(Spain) 1986	21 April 1969 (age 57)	17 years, 75 days
5.	(China) Chen Jianghua	(Japan) 2006	12 March 1989 (age 37)	17 years, 160 days
6.	(Brazil) Tiago Splitter	(United States) 2002	1 January 1985 (age 41)	17 years, 240 days
7.	(Lebanon) Roy Samaha	(United States) 2002	12 September 1984 (age 42)	17 years, 351 days

*describes age on first day of the tournament

== Game score records ==
=== Biggest game score ===
#	Year	Round	Rivals	Team score
1.	(Philippines) 1978	Preliminary Round	Brazil 154 - 97 China	154
2.	(Argentina) 1990	Preliminary Round	United States 146 - 67 Korea	146
3.	(Colombia) 1982	Final Round	Colombia 76 - 143 Soviet Union	143
4.	(Puerto Rico) 1974	Preliminary Round	Soviet Union 140 - 48 Central African Republic	140
5.	(Argentina) 1990	Preliminary Round	Brazil 138 - 95 China	138

=== Lowest game score ===
#	Year	Round	Rivals	Team score
1.	(Argentina) 1950	Final Round	Egypt 19 - 38 Brazil	19
2.	(Argentina) 1950	Repass Round I	Chile 40 - 24 Yugoslavia	24
3.	(Argentina) 1950	Preliminary Round I	Peru 33 - 27 Yugoslavia	27
3.	(Argentina) 1950	Final Round	France 27 - 59 Brazil	27
5.	(Argentina) 1950	Final Round	Egypt 31 - 28 France	28
5.	(Brazil) 1954	Final Round	United States 72 - 28 Formosa	28

=== Biggest margin ===
#	Year	Round	Rivals	Margin points
1.	(Puerto Rico) 1974	Preliminary Round	Soviet Union 140 - 48 Central African Republic	92
2.	(Spain) 1986	Preliminary Round	Canada 128 - 38 Malaysia	90
3.	(Argentina) 1990	Preliminary Round	United States 146 - 67 Korea	79
4.	(Spain) 1986	Preliminary Round	Yugoslavia 131 - 61 Malaysia	70
5.	(Colombia) 1982	Final Round	Colombia 76 - 143 Soviet Union	67

== Top scorers in a single game ==
Player	Points Scored	Opponent	Year
(South Korea) Hur Jae	54	Egypt	1990
(Greece) Nikos Galis	53	Panama	1986
(Brazil) Oscar Schmidt	52	Australia	1990
(Spain) Jordi Villacampa	48	Venezuela	1990
(Germany) Dirk Nowitzki	47	Angola	2006
(Socialist Federal Republic of Yugoslavia) Dražen Petrović	47	Netherlands	1986
(South Korea) Lee Chung-Hee	45	Brazil	1986
(Czechoslovakia) Kamil Brabenec	44	Puerto Rico	1978
(Peru) Ricardo Duarte	42	Japan	1963
(Mexico) Arturo Guerrero	42	Central African Republic	1974

== Players with the most tournaments and games played ==
Player	Number of World Cups	Games Played	Years played	Ref.
(Brazil) Ubiratan "Bira" Pereira Maciel	5	41	1963, 1967, 1970, 1974, 1978	
(Argentina) Luis Scola	5	41	2002, 2006, 2010, 2014, 2019	
(Brazil) Marcel De Souza	5	37	1974, 1978, 1982, 1986, 1990	
(Spain) Rudy Fernández	5	37	2006, 2010, 2014, 2019, 2023	
(Australia) Phil Smyth	5	36	1978, 1982, 1986, 1990, 1994	
(Puerto Rico) Jerome Mincy	5	36	1986, 1990, 1994, 1998, 2002	
(Brazil) Alex Garcia	5	32	2002, 2006, 2010, 2014, 2019	
(Puerto Rico) Daniel Santiago	5	30	1998, 2002, 2006, 2010, 2014	
(Brazil) Anderson Varejão	5	29	2002, 2006, 2010, 2014, 2019	
(Brazil) Marcelo Huertas	5	28	2006, 2010, 2014, 2019, 2023	
(Brazil) Leandro Barbosa	5	27	2002, 2006, 2010, 2014, 2019	
(Brazil) Marcelinho Machado	5	25	1998, 2002, 2006, 2010, 2014	
(Angola) Eduardo Mingas	5	23	2002, 2006, 2010, 2014, 2019	
(Socialist Federal Republic of Yugoslavia) Dražen Dalipagić	4	35	1974, 1978, 1982, 1986	
(Soviet Union) Alexander Belostenny	4	35	1978, 1982, 1986, 1990	
(Brazil) Oscar Schmidt	4	34	1978, 1982, 1986, 1990	
(Argentina) Rubén Wolkowyski	4	34	1994, 1998, 2002, 2006	
(Brazil) Amaury Pasos	4	33	1954, 1959, 1963, 1967	
(Spain) Andrés Jiménez Fernández	4	33	1982, 1986, 1990, 1994	
(Puerto Rico) José Rafael Ortiz	4	33	1990, 1994, 1998, 2002	
(Spain) Juan Carlos Navarro	4	33	2002, 2006, 2010, 2014	
(Argentina) Marcelo Milanesio	4	32	1986, 1990, 1994, 1998	
(Argentina) Fabricio Oberto	4	32	1998, 2002, 2006, 2010	
(Spain) Marc Gasol	4	32	2006, 2010, 2014, 2019	
(Brazil) Wlamir Marques	4	31	1954, 1959, 1963, 1970	
(Soviet Union) Sergei Belov	4	31	1967, 1970, 1974, 1978	
(Australia) Ray Borner	4	29	1982, 1986, 1990, 1994	
(Australia) Andrew Gaze	4	29	1986, 1990, 1994, 1998	
(Brazil) João José Vianna	4	29	1986, 1990, 1994, 1998	
(Socialist Federal Republic of Yugoslavia) Krešimir Ćosić	4	28	1967, 1970, 1974, 1978	
(New Zealand) Kirk Penney	4	27	2002, 2006, 2010, 2014	
(Brazil) Tiago Splitter	4	26	2002, 2006, 2010, 2014	
(Spain) Felipe Reyes	4	23	2002, 2006, 2010, 2014	
(Iran) Hamed Haddadi	4	19	2010, 2014, 2019, 2023	

== Top medalists ==
Player	Gold Medals	Silver Medals	Bronze Medals	Total Medals
(Socialist Federal Republic of Yugoslavia) Krešimir Ćosić	2 (1970, 1978)	2 (1967, 1974)	0	4
(Brazil) Wlamir Marques	2 (1959, 1963)	2 (1954, 1970)	0	4
(Brazil) Amaury Pasos	2 (1959, 1963)	1 (1954)	1 (1967)	4
(Soviet Union) Sergei Belov	2 (1967, 1974)	1 (1978)	1 (1970)	4
(Brazil) Carmo de Souza	2 (1959, 1963)	1 (1970)	0	3
(Socialist Federal Republic of Yugoslavia) / (Federal Republic of Yugoslavia) Vlade Divac	2 (1990, 2002)	0	1 (1986)	3
(Brazil) Jatyr Schall	2 (1959, 1963)	0	1 (1967)	3
(Soviet Union) Modestas Paulauskas	2 (1967, 1974)	0	1 (1970)	3
(Soviet Union) Priit Tomson	2 (1967, 1974)	0	1 (1970)	3
(Federal Republic of Yugoslavia) Dejan Bodiroga	2 (1998, 2002)	0	0	2
(United States) Stephen Curry	2 (2010, 2014)	0	0	2
(Federal Republic of Yugoslavia) Predrag Drobnjak	2 (1998, 2002)	0	0	2
(Spain) Rudy Fernández	2 (2006, 2019)	0	0	2
(Spain) Marc Gasol	2 (2006, 2019)	0	0	2
(United States) Rudy Gay	2 (2010, 2014)	0	0	2
(United States) Derrick Rose	2 (2010, 2014)	0	0	2
(Federal Republic of Yugoslavia) Dejan Tomašević	2 (1998, 2002)	0	0	2
(Brazil) Waldemar Blatskauskas	2 (1959, 1963)	0	0	2

== Players with the most total medals won ==
Player	Gold Medals	Silver Medals	Bronze Medals	Total Medals
(Socialist Federal Republic of Yugoslavia) Krešimir Ćosić	2 (1970, 1978)	2 (1967, 1974)	0	4
(Brazil) Wlamir Marques	2 (1959, 1963)	2 (1954, 1970)	0	4
(Brazil) Amaury Pasos	2 (1959, 1963)	1 (1954)	1 (1967)	4
(Soviet Union) Sergei Belov	2 (1967, 1974)	1 (1978)	1 (1970)	4
(Soviet Union) Alexander Belostenny	1 (1982)	3 (1978, 1986, 1990)	0	4
(Brazil) Ubiratan "Bira" Pereira Maciel	1 (1963)	1 (1970)	2 (1967, 1978)	4
(Socialist Federal Republic of Yugoslavia) Dražen Dalipagić	1 (1978)	1 (1974)	2 (1982, 1986)	4

== Highest attendance ==
Rank	Year	Date	Venue	Round	Match	Attendance	Source
1	(Philippines) / (Japan) / (Indonesia) 2023	25 August 2023	Philippine Arena, Bocaue	Preliminary round	Philippines v Dominican Republic	38,115	
2	(Canada) 1994	14 August 1994	SkyDome, Toronto	Final	United States v Russia	32,616	

== All-time team records ==
FIBA Africa, FIBA Americas, FIBA Asia, FIBA Europe, FIBA Oceania

Team	Games played	Wins	Losses	Winning percentage	Points for	Points against	Point differential	Best finish
United States	166	134	32	.807	14,764	12,055	+2,709	5$\times$winners
Brazil	145	87	58	.600	11,733	10,921	+812	2$\times$winners
Yugoslavia*	78	58	20	.744	6,591	5,845	+746	5$\times$winners
Argentina	112	65	47	.580	8,998	8,537	+461	1$\times$winners
Soviet Union*	80	66	14	.825	7,141	5,657	+1,484	3$\times$winners
Spain	105	74	31	.705	8,946	7,868	+1,078	2$\times$winners
Canada	115	45	70	.391	9,130	9,220	−90	Third place
Puerto Rico	103	43	60	.417	8,112	8,382	−270	Final round
Germany	44	29	15	.659	3,665	3,424	+241	1$\times$winners
Italy	82	47	35	.573	6,607	6,307	+300	Final round
Australia	93	44	49	.473	7,541	7,652	−111	Fourth place
Greece	66	38	28	.576	5,234	5,102	+132	Runners-up
China	70	18	52	.257	5,733	6,678	−945	Round of 16
Uruguay	50	17	33	.340	3,309	3,690	−381	Final round
France	68	37	31	.544	4,620	4,618	+2	Third place
Russia	39	25	14	.641	3,083	2,936	+147	Runners-up
Cuba	35	18	17	.514	2,772	2,751	+21	Final round
Angola	56	16	40	.286	4,166	4,680	−514	Round of 16
South Korea	51	10	41	.196	4,016	4,902	−886	Preliminary round
Czechoslovakia*	30	17	13	.567	2,713	2,618	+95	Final round
Lithuania	49	33	16	.673	3,975	3,637	+338	Third place
Philippines	45	14	31	.311	3,351	3,914	−563	Third place
Egypt	47	8	39	.170	3,103	3,867	−764	Final round
Serbia	58	40	18	.690	5,045	4,306	+739	Runners-up
Mexico	40	19	21	.475	2,988	3,085	−97	Final round
Turkey	38	24	14	.632	3,005	2,883	+122	Runners-up
New Zealand	42	17	25	.405	3,323	3,640	−317	Fourth place
Peru	27	10	17	.370	1,565	1,671	−106	Final round
Panama	25	9	16	.360	2,089	2,232	−143	Preliminary round
Japan	36	8	28	.222	2,440	2,914	−474	Preliminary round
Chile	19	9	10	.474	1,025	1,069	−44	Third place
Israel	19	7	12	.368	1,262	1,440	−178	Final round
Chinese Taipei	18	7	11	.389	982	1,077	−95	Fourth place
Croatia	20	12	8	.600	1,637	1,449	+188	Third place
Slovenia	30	17	13	.567	2,500	2,480	+20	Seventh place
Venezuela	28	8	20	.286	2,222	2,467	−245	Preliminary round
Senegal	28	4	24	.143	1,919	2,330	−411	Round of 16
Ivory Coast	27	2	25	.074	1,910	2,419	−509	Preliminary round
Lebanon	20	5	15	.250	1,460	1,869	−409	Preliminary round
Nigeria	16	7	9	.438	1,225	1,195	+30	Round of 16
Paraguay	13	3	10	.231	733	953	−220	Preliminary round
Bulgaria	9	5	4	.556	532	510	+22	Final round
Poland	17	8	9	.471	1,285	1,320	−35	Final round
Dominican Republic	23	9	14	.391	1,782	1,954	−172	Round of 16
Netherlands	5	2	3	.400	422	405	+17	Preliminary round
Ecuador	5	2	3	.400	222	232	−10	Preliminary round
West Germany*	5	2	3	.400	382	397	−15	Preliminary round
Iran	20	4	16	.200	1,345	1,564	−219	Preliminary round
Ukraine	5	2	3	.400	344	369	−25	Preliminary round
Finland	10	3	7	.300	767	857	−90	Preliminary round
Jordan	15	1	14	.067	1,082	1,403	−321	Preliminary round
Tunisia	10	3	7	.300	677	793	−116	Preliminary round
Georgia	5	2	3	.400	379	407	–28	Preliminary round
Latvia	8	6	2	.600	714	636	+78	Fifth place
South Sudan	5	3	2	.600	456	431	+25	Preliminary round
Czech Republic	8	4	4	.500	662	651	+11	Sixth place
Montenegro	10	4	6	.400	767	796	–29	Preliminary round
Algeria	5	1	4	.200	395	476	−81	Preliminary round
Cape Verde	5	1	4	.200	366	432	–66	Preliminary round
Qatar	5	0	5	.000	310	456	−146	Preliminary round
Malaysia	5	0	5	.000	313	539	−226	Preliminary round
Colombia	6	0	6	.000	473	656	−183	Preliminary round
Central African Republic	7	0	7	.000	477	757	−280	Preliminary round
Total	1,213 games				190,781 points			

*Defunct country

- Update after 2023 World Cup
