= FIBA Basketball World Cup Top Scorer =

The FIBA Basketball World Cup Top Scorer, although not an official award given by FIBA, represents the player who led FIBA Basketball World Cup in average points scored per game (regardless of number of games played in tournament). The tournament's leader in total points scored is also noted.

== History ==
Álvaro Salvadores, of Spain, was the leading scorer by points per game, of the first FIBA World Cup (then called the FIBA World Championship), the 1950 FIBA World Championship, which was held in Argentina. Chile's Rufino Bernedo, led that same tournament in total points scored, with 86. At the 1954 event, it was Uruguay's Oscar Moglia, that led in scoring, with an average of 18.7 points per game.

He was followed in 1959 by James T. L. Chen, of the Republic of China (Taiwan), who led in points per game, at 20.1, and Team USA's Jerry Vayda, who was first in total points scored, with 162. In 1963, the lead scorer was Peru's Ricardo Duarte, who had an average of 23.1 points per game. Poland's Mieczysław Łopatka, led in scoring average in 1967, at 19.7 points per game, while his teammate, Bohdan Likszo, led in total points scored, at 180.

They were followed by South Korea's Shin Dong-pa, who averaged 32.6 points per game in 1970. Mexico's Arturo Guerrero, who averaged 27.0 points per game in 1974, was that competition's leader in scoring average, while Wayne Brabender of Spain, led in total points scored, with 207. At the next competition, in 1978, it was Kamil Brabenec of Czechoslovakia, that was the leader in scoring average, at 26.9 points per game, while Yugoslavia's Dražen Dalipagić led the same competition in total points scored, with 202.

Rolando Frazer of Panama, was first in scoring average at the 1982 FIBA World Championship, in which he averaged 24.4 points per game, while Yugoslavia's Dragan Kićanović, was first in total points scored, with 190 points. Nikos Galis of Greece, led the 1986 FIBA World Championship in scoring. After Galis, Oscar Schmidt of Brazil, led the 1990 FIBA World Championship in scoring.

Schmidt was followed by Australia's Andrew Gaze, who was the leading scorer of the 1994 FIBA World Championship. After Gaze, it was Spain's Alberto Herreros, who was the leading scorer of the 1998 FIBA World Championship. Herreros was followed by Germany's Dirk Nowitzki, who led the 2002 edition in scoring.

China's Yao Ming, led the 2006 edition in scoring average, as he averaged 25.3 points per game, while Dirk Nowitzki of Germany was first in total points scored, with 209 points. Argentina's Luis Scola, led the 2010 edition in scoring. J. J. Barea of Puerto Rico, led the 2014 FIBA World Cup in points per game, with a scoring average of 22.0 points per game. At the same event, Pau Gasol of Spain was the leader in total points scored, with 140 points.

To date, no player has been the World Basketball Cup's leading scorer by points per game in more than one competition. However, Dirk Nowitzki led the tournament in total points scored twice, in the 2002 and 2006 competitions.

== Top scorers by tournament ==
=== Key ===
| | Denotes player whose team won that years tournament |
| * | Inducted into the Naismith Memorial Basketball Hall of Fame |
| ** | Inducted into the FIBA Hall of Fame |
| *** | Inducted into both the Naismith and FIBA Halls of Fame |
| | Denotes player who is still active |
| Player (X) | Denotes the number of times the player had been the top scorer at that time |

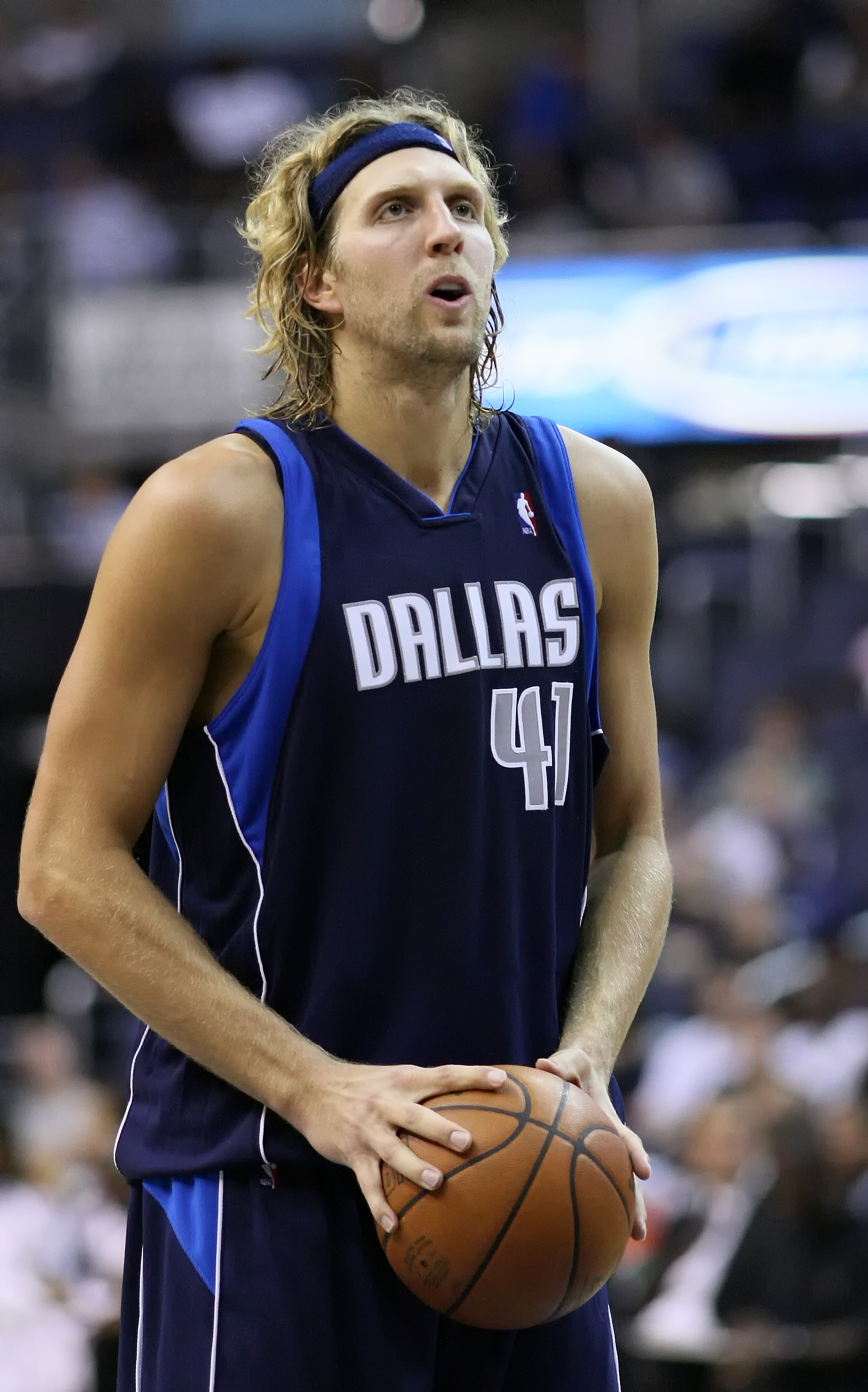
Dirk Nowitzki was the top scorer in 2002.

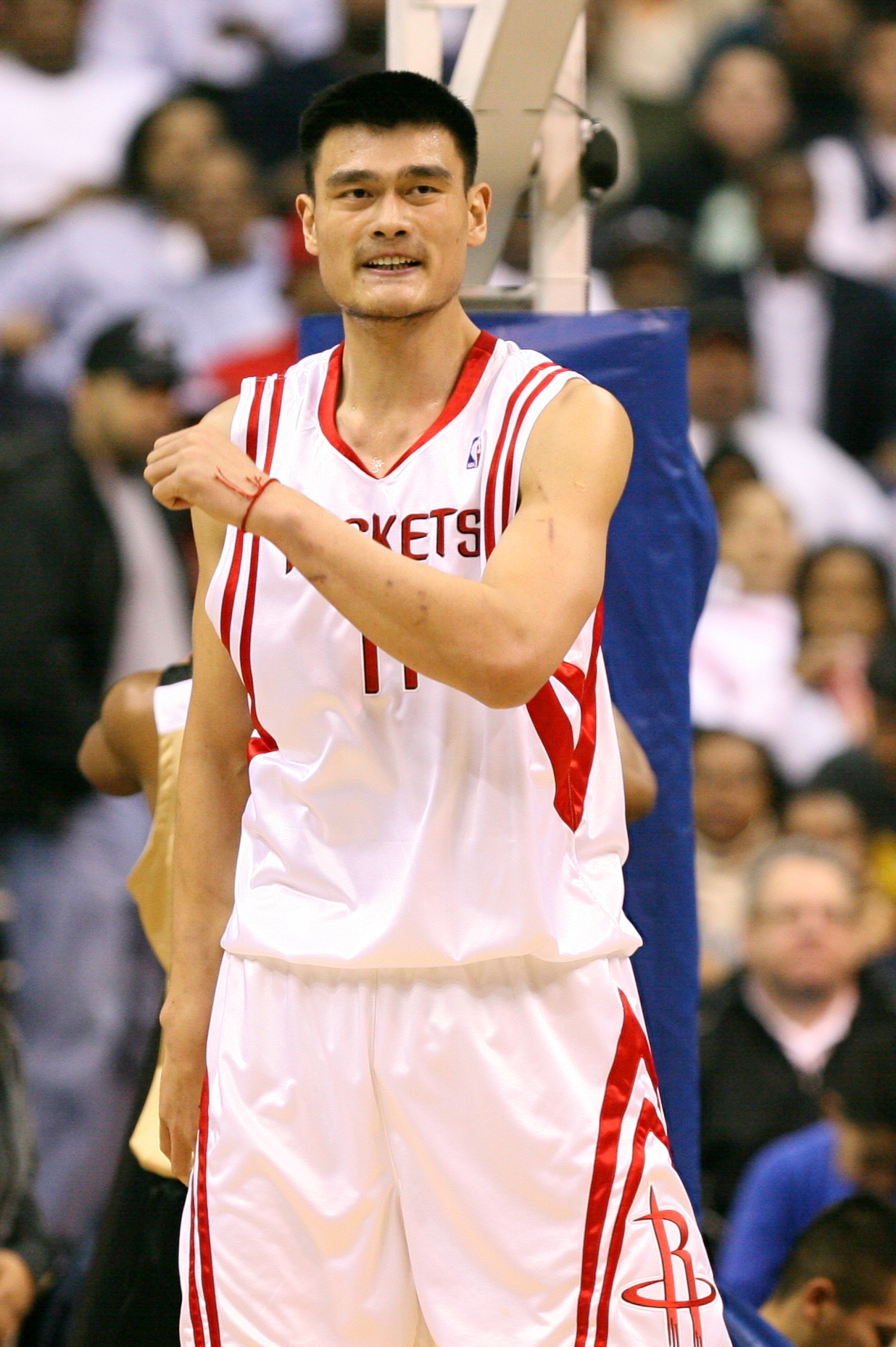
Yao Ming was the top scorer in 2006.

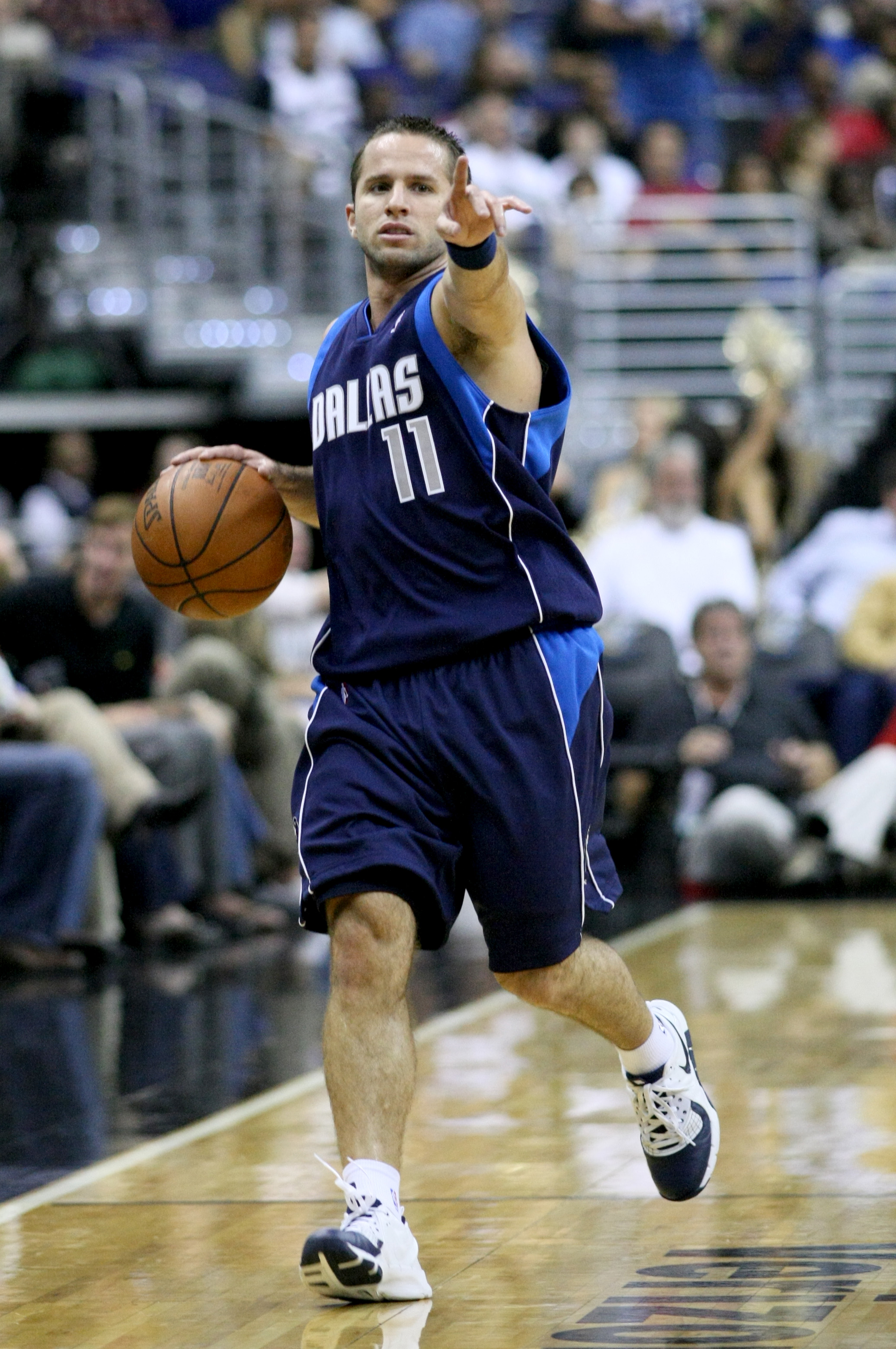
J. J. Barea was the top scorer in 2014.

=== Top scorers by points per game ===
| Year | Player | Scoring Average | Ref. |
|---|---|---|---|
| 1950 | (Spain) Álvaro Salvadores | 13.8 | |
| 1954 | (Uruguay) Oscar Moglia** | 18.7 | |
| 1959 | (Taiwan) James T. L. Chen | 20.1 | |
| 1963 | (Peru) Ricardo Duarte | 23.1 | |
| 1967 | (Poland) Mieczysław Łopatka** | 19.7 | |
| 1970 | (South Korea) Shin Dong-pa | 32.6 | |
| 1974 | (Mexico) Arturo Guerrero | 27.0 | |
| 1978 | (Czechoslovakia) Kamil Brabenec | 26.9 | |
| 1982 | (Panama) Rolando Frazer | 24.4 | |
| 1986 | (Greece) Nikos Galis*** | 33.7 | |
| 1990 | (Brazil) Oscar Schmidt*** | 34.6 | |
| 1994 | (Australia) Andrew Gaze** | 23.9 | |
| 1998 | (Spain) Alberto Herreros | 17.9 | |
| 2002 | (Germany) Dirk Nowitzki* | 24.0 | |
| 2006 | (China) Yao Ming*** | 25.3 | |
| 2010 | (Argentina) Luis Scola | 27.1 | |
| 2014 | (Puerto Rico) J. J. Barea | 22.0 | |
| 2019 | (South Korea) Ra Gun-ah | 23.0 | |
| 2023 | (Slovenia) Luka Dončić | 27.0 | |

=== By total points scored ===
| Year | Player | Total points scored | Ref. |
|---|---|---|---|
| 1950 | (Chile) Rufino Bernedo | 86 | |
| 1954 | (Uruguay) Oscar Moglia** | 168 | |
| 1959 | (United States) Jerry Vayda | 162 | |
| 1963 | (Peru) Ricardo Duarte | 163 | |
| 1967 | (Poland) Bohdan Likszo | 180 | |
| 1970 | (South Korea) Shin Dong-pa | 261 | |
| 1974 | (Spain) Wayne Brabender | 207 | |
| 1978 | (Socialist Federal Republic of Yugoslavia) Dražen Dalipagić*** | 202 | |
| 1982 | (Socialist Federal Republic of Yugoslavia) Dragan Kićanović** | 190 | |
| 1986 | (Greece) Nikos Galis*** | 337 | |
| 1990 | (Brazil) Oscar Schmidt*** | 277 | |
| 1994 | (Australia) Andrew Gaze** | 191 | |
| 1998 | (Spain) Alberto Herreros | 161 | |
| 2002 | (Germany) Dirk Nowitzki* | 216 | |
| 2006 | (Germany) Dirk Nowitzki* (2) | 209 | |
| 2010 | (Argentina) Luis Scola | 244 | |
| 2014 | (Spain) Pau Gasol* | 140 | |
| 2019 | (Serbia) Bogdan Bogdanović | 183 | |
| 2023 | (Slovenia) Luka Dončić | 216 | |

== Finals Topscorers ==
The Grand Final was established in 1978.

| Year | Player | Points |
|---|---|---|
| 1978 | (Socialist Federal Republic of Yugoslavia) Dražen Dalipagić | 21 |
| 1982 | (Soviet Union) Anatoly Myshkin | 29 |
| 1986 | (United States) Kenny Smith | 23 |
| 1990 | (Socialist Federal Republic of Yugoslavia) Žarko Paspalj | 20 |
| 1994 | (Russia) Sergei Babkov | 22 |
| 1998 | (Socialist Federal Republic of Yugoslavia) Željko Rebrača | 16 |
| 2002 | (Argentina) Fabricio Oberto | 28 |
| 2006 | (Spain) Juan Carlos Navarro (Spain) Jorge Garbajosa | 20 |
| 2010 | (United States) Kevin Durant | 28 |
| 2014 | (United States) Kyrie Irving | 26 |
| 2019 | (Argentina) Gabriel Deck | 24 |
| 2023 | (Germany) Dennis Schröder | 28 |

== See also ==
- FIBA World Cup
- FIBA World Cup MVP
- FIBA World Cup All-Tournament Team
- FIBA World Cup Records
- FIBA EuroBasket
- FIBA EuroBasket MVP
- FIBA EuroBasket Top Scorer
- FIBA EuroBasket All-Tournament Team
- FIBA EuroBasket Records
- FIBA Hall of Fame
- FIBA Order of Merit
- FIBA's 50 Greatest Players (1991)

== Sources ==
- Guia Basketme (August 29, 2014). "Guia Basketme Copa del Mundo - Actualización 2.0". Guia Basketme: 38–39.
- Guia Basketme (April 2, 2016). "Guia Basketme Copa del Mundo - Actualización 2.0". Guia Basketme: 38–39.
- Guia Basketme (August 28, 2010). "Guia Basketme Mundial 2010". Guia Basketme: 35.
