= 2023 FIBA Basketball World Cup squads =

The 2023 FIBA Basketball World Cup included teams whose rosters consisted of 12 players; a team may opted to have one naturalized player as per FIBA eligibility rules in their roster.

Age and club were as of the start of the tournament, 25 August 2023.

== Group A ==
=== Angola ===
A 23-player roster was announced on 26 May. The final roster was announced on 23 August.

Angola men's national basketball team – 2023 FIBA Basketball World Cup roster
Players
Coaches

Pos.	No.	Name	Age – Date of birth	Height	Club	Ctr.
F	0	Eduardo Francisco	19 – 5 November 2003	2.00 m (6 ft 7 in)	Benfica	(Portugal)
G	1	Gerson Domingos	27 – 16 April 1996	1.80 m (5 ft 11 in)	Petro de Luanda	(Angola)
G	2	José Dimitri Maconda	21 – 28 November 2001	1.87 m (6 ft 2 in)	LWD Basket	(Netherlands)
SG	3	Gerson Gonçalves	27 – 29 March 1996	1.93 m (6 ft 4 in)	Petro de Luanda	(Angola)
PG	5	Childe Dundão	25 – 17 May 1998	1.67 m (5 ft 6 in)	Petro de Luanda	(Angola)
C	8	Jilson Bango	24 – 6 January 1999	2.08 m (6 ft 10 in)	Löwen Braunschweig	(Germany)
F	9	Leonel Paulo (C)	37 – 30 April 1986	1.98 m (6 ft 6 in)	Sangalhos DC	(Portugal)
PF	10	Antonio Monteiro	34 – 2 April 1989	2.06 m (6 ft 9 in)	Sporting CP	(Portugal)
F	13	João Fernandes	30 – 1 December 1992	2.00 m (6 ft 7 in)	Sporting CP	(Portugal)
C	20	Bruno Fernando	25 – 15 August 1998	2.08 m (6 ft 10 in)	Atlanta Hawks	(United States)
PF	22	Silvio De Sousa	24 – 7 October 1998	2.06 m (6 ft 9 in)	Aris	(Greece)
C	34	Kevin Kokila	21 – 3 September 2001	2.05 m (6 ft 9 in)	JL Bourg Basket	(France)

Head coach

- (Spain) Josep Clarós

Assistant coach(es)

- (Angola) Miguel Lutonda
- (Angola) Aníbal Moreira

Legend

- (C) Team captain
- Club – describes last
  club before the tournament
- Age – describes age
  on 25 August 2023

=== Dominican Republic ===
A 30-player roster was announced on 27 July. The final roster was confirmed on 20 August.

Dominican Republic men's national basketball team – 2023 FIBA Basketball World Cup roster
Players
Coaches

Pos.	No.	Name	Age – Date of birth	Height	Club	Ctr.
F	0	Antonio Peña	37 – 20 July 1986	2.04 m (6 ft 8 in)	Reales de La Vega	(Dominican Republic)
G	2	Rigoberto Mendoza	31 – 6 July 1992	1.91 m (6 ft 3 in)	Obradoiro CAB	(Spain)
PG	3	Jean Montero	20 – 3 July 2003	1.90 m (6 ft 3 in)	Real Betis	(Spain)
PG	4	Gelvis Solano	26 – 1 June 1997	1.85 m (6 ft 1 in)	Reales de La Vega	(Dominican Republic)
SG	5	Víctor Liz (C)	37 – 12 May 1986	1.88 m (6 ft 2 in)	Capitanes de Arecibo	(Puerto Rico)
PG	10	Andrés Feliz	26 – 15 July 1997	1.83 m (6 ft 0 in)	Club Joventut Badalona	(Spain)
C	11	Eloy Vargas	34 – 30 December 1988	2.11 m (6 ft 11 in)	Trotamundos	(Venezuela)
C	12	Ángel Delgado	28 – 20 November 1994	2.06 m (6 ft 9 in)	Beşiktaş	(Turkey)
G	20	Gerardo Suero	34 – 20 April 1989	1.96 m (6 ft 5 in)	Soles de Santo Domingo	(Dominican Republic)
SF	24	L. J. Figueroa	25 – 28 March 1998	1.98 m (6 ft 6 in)	Ratiopharm Ulm	(Germany)
SG	25	Lester Quiñones	22 – 16 November 2000	1.96 m (6 ft 5 in)	Golden State Warriors	(United States)
C	32	Karl-Anthony Towns	27 – 15 November 1995	2.13 m (7 ft 0 in)	Minnesota Timberwolves	(United States)

Head coach

- (Argentina) Néstor García

Assistant coach(es)

- (Venezuela) Daniel Seoane

Legend

- (C) Team captain
- Club – describes last
  club before the tournament
- Age – describes age
  on 25 August 2023

=== Italy ===
A 16-player roster was announced on 19 July. It was reduced to 14 players on 7 August. The final roster was confirmed on 14 August.

Italy men's national basketball team – 2023 FIBA Basketball World Cup roster
Players
Coaches

Pos.	No.	Name	Age – Date of birth	Height	Club	Ctr.
PG	0	Marco Spissu	28 – 5 February 1995	1.85 m (6 ft 1 in)	Reyer Venezia	(Italy)
SG	7	Stefano Tonut	29 – 7 November 1993	1.93 m (6 ft 4 in)	Olimpia Milano	(Italy)
F/C	9	Nicolò Melli	32 – 26 January 1991	2.05 m (6 ft 9 in)	Olimpia Milano	(Italy)
SF	13	Simone Fontecchio	27 – 9 December 1995	2.01 m (6 ft 7 in)	Utah Jazz	(United States)
PF	17	Giampaolo Ricci	31 – 27 September 1991	2.00 m (6 ft 7 in)	Olimpia Milano	(Italy)
SG	18	Matteo Spagnolo	20 – 10 January 2003	1.94 m (6 ft 4 in)	Alba Berlin	(Germany)
F	33	Achille Polonara	31 – 23 November 1991	2.05 m (6 ft 9 in)	Virtus Bologna	(Italy)
C	35	Mouhamet Diouf	21 – 10 September 2001	2.08 m (6 ft 10 in)	Río Breogán	(Spain)
PF	40	Luca Severini	27 – 20 June 1996	2.04 m (6 ft 8 in)	Derthona Basket	(Italy)
SF	50	Gabriele Procida	21 – 1 June 2002	2.00 m (6 ft 7 in)	Alba Berlin	(Germany)
PG	54	Alessandro Pajola	23 – 9 November 1999	1.94 m (6 ft 4 in)	Virtus Bologna	(Italy)
F	70	Luigi Datome (C)	35 – 27 November 1987	2.03 m (6 ft 8 in)	Olimpia Milano	(Italy)

Head coach

- (Italy) Gianmarco Pozzecco

Assistant coach(es)

- (Italy) Edoardo Casalone
- (Italy) Riccardo Fois
- (Italy) Federico Fucà
- (Italy) Giuseppe Poeta
- (Italy) Carlo Recalcati

Legend

- (C) Team captain
- Club – describes last
  club before the tournament
- Age – describes age
  on 25 August 2023

=== Philippines ===
A 21-player roster was announced on 6 June. It was reduced to 16 players after the exclusions of Carl Tamayo, Jordan Heading, and Poy Erram due to injuries and the commitment of Utah Jazz guard Jordan Clarkson to play for the country as its naturalized player. The final roster was announced on 23 August.

Philippines men's national basketball team – 2023 FIBA Basketball World Cup roster
Players
Coaches

Pos.	No.	Name	Age – Date of birth	Height	Club	Ctr.
G	4	Kiefer Ravena	29 – 27 October 1993	1.83 m (6 ft 0 in)	Shiga Lakes	(Japan)
G	6	Jordan Clarkson	31 – 7 June 1992	1.96 m (6 ft 5 in)	Utah Jazz	(United States)
G	8	Scottie Thompson	30 – 12 July 1993	1.85 m (6 ft 1 in)	Barangay Ginebra San Miguel	(Philippines)
C	11	Kai Sotto	21 – 11 May 2002	2.18 m (7 ft 2 in)	Hiroshima Dragonflies	(Japan)
F	13	Jamie Malonzo	27 – 31 July 1996	2.01 m (6 ft 7 in)	Barangay Ginebra San Miguel	(Philippines)
C	15	June Mar Fajardo	32 – 17 November 1989	2.08 m (6 ft 10 in)	San Miguel Beermen	(Philippines)
G/F	16	Roger Pogoy	31 – 16 June 1992	1.88 m (6 ft 2 in)	TNT Tropang Giga	(Philippines)
G	17	CJ Perez	29 – 17 November 1993	1.88 m (6 ft 2 in)	San Miguel Beermen	(Philippines)
G/F	23	Rhenz Abando	25 – 11 March 1998	1.88 m (6 ft 2 in)	Anyang KGC	(South Korea)
G	24	Dwight Ramos	24 – 2 September 1998	1.93 m (6 ft 4 in)	Levanga Hokkaido	(Japan)
F/C	25	Japeth Aguilar (C)	36 – 25 January 1987	2.05 m (6 ft 9 in)	Barangay Ginebra San Miguel	(Philippines)
F/C	34	Ariel John Edu	23 – 1 January 2000	2.08 m (6 ft 10 in)	Toyama Grouses	(Japan)

Head coach

- (Philippines) Chot Reyes

Assistant coach(es)

- (United States) Tim Cone
- (Philippines) Jong Uichico

Legend

- (C) Team captain
- Club – describes last
  club before the tournament
- Age – describes age
  on 25 August 2023

== Group B ==
=== China ===
An 18-player roster was announced on 13 June. On 24 July 2023, the Chinese Basketball Association announced that Minnesota Timberwolves forward Kyle Anderson had become a naturalized Chinese citizen and would play for the country. The final squad was revealed on 22 August.

China men's national basketball team – 2023 FIBA Basketball World Cup roster
Players
Coaches

Pos.	No.	Name	Age – Date of birth	Height	Club	Ctr.
SF	1	Li Kaier	29 – 20 September 1993	2.06 m (6 ft 9 in)	Minnesota Timberwolves	(United States)
PG	3	Hu Mingxuan	25 – 10 March 1998	1.93 m (6 ft 4 in)	Guangdong Southern Tigers	(China)
G	4	Zhao Jiwei	28 – 25 August 1995	1.85 m (6 ft 1 in)	Liaoning Flying Leopards	(China)
SG	8	Zhao Rui	27 – 14 January 1996	1.95 m (6 ft 5 in)	Xinjiang Flying Tigers	(China)
F	10	Zhou Peng (C)	33 – 11 October 1989	2.06 m (6 ft 9 in)	Shenzhen Leopards	(China)
C	14	Wang Zhelin	29 – 20 January 1994	2.13 m (7 ft 0 in)	Shanghai Sharks	(China)
C	15	Zhou Qi	27 – 16 January 1996	2.16 m (7 ft 1 in)	Guangdong Southern Tigers	(China)
G	19	Cui Yongxi	20 – 28 May 2003	2.01 m (6 ft 7 in)	Guangzhou Loong Lions	(China)
C	21	Hu Jinqiu	25 – 24 September 1997	2.10 m (6 ft 11 in)	Zhejiang Lions	(China)
SF	26	Zhu Junlong	24 – 13 July 1999	2.01 m (6 ft 7 in)	Zhejiang Lions	(China)
PF	27	Fu Hao	26 – 24 August 1997	2.08 m (6 ft 10 in)	Liaoning Flying Leopards	(China)
F	77	Zhang Zhenlin	24 – 28 January 1999	2.08 m (6 ft 10 in)	Liaoning Flying Leopards	(China)

Head coach

- (Serbia) Aleksandar Đorđević

Assistant coach(es)

- (Croatia) Goran Bjedov

Legend

- (C) Team captain
- Club – describes last
  club before the tournament
- Age – describes age
  on 25 August 2023

=== Puerto Rico ===
A 14-player roster was announced on 27 July. The final squad was revealed on 22 August.

Puerto Rico men's national basketball team roster
Players
Coaches

Pos.	No.	Name	Age – Date of birth	Height	Club	Ctr.
SF	00	John Holland	34 – 6 November 1988	1.96 m (6 ft 5 in)	Hapoel Tel Aviv	(Israel)
F	0	Isaiah Piñeiro	28 – 2 February 1995	2.01 m (6 ft 7 in)	Piratas de Quebradillas	(Puerto Rico)
C	1	George Conditt IV	23 – 22 August 2000	2.08 m (6 ft 10 in)	Gigantes de Carolina	(Puerto Rico)
PG	3	Jordan Howard	27 – 6 January 1996	1.80 m (5 ft 11 in)	Obradoiro	(Spain)
G	11	Stephen Thompson Jr.	26 – 23 March 1997	1.94 m (6 ft 4 in)	Vaqueros de Bayamón	(Puerto Rico)
SF	12	Aleem Ford	25 – 22 December 1997	2.03 m (6 ft 8 in)	Leones de Ponce	(Puerto Rico)
F	21	Justin Reyes	28 – 16 March 1995	1.93 m (6 ft 4 in)	Pallacanestro Trieste	(Italy)
C	28	Ismael Romero	32 – 23 June 1991	2.06 m (6 ft 9 in)	Vaqueros de Bayamón	(Puerto Rico)
PF	32	Christopher Ortiz (C)	30 – 2 April 1993	2.03 m (6 ft 8 in)	Osos de Manati	(Puerto Rico)
F/C	41	Arnaldo Toro Barea	25 – 28 October 1997	2.03 m (6 ft 8 in)	Cariduros de Fajardo	(Puerto Rico)
PG	51	Tremont Waters	25 – 10 January 1998	1.80 m (5 ft 11 in)	Gigantes de Carolina	(Puerto Rico)
SG	55	Ethan Thompson	24 – 4 May 1999	1.96 m (6 ft 5 in)	Windy City Bulls	(United States)

Head coach

- (Puerto Rico) Nelson Colón

Assistant coach(es)

- (Puerto Rico) Carlos González

Legend

- (C) Team captain
- Club – describes last
  club before the tournament
- Age – describes age
  on 25 August 2023

=== Serbia ===
A 20-player roster was announced on 24 July. The final roster was announced on 22 August.

Serbia men's national basketball team – 2023 FIBA Basketball World Cup roster
Players
Coaches

Pos.	No.	Name	Age – Date of birth	Height	Club	Ctr.
C	3	Filip Petrušev	23 – 15 April 2000	2.11 m (6 ft 11 in)	Philadelphia 76ers	(United States)
PF	5	Nikola Jović	20 – 9 June 2003	2.08 m (6 ft 10 in)	Miami Heat	(United States)
SG	7	Bogdan Bogdanović (C)	31 – 18 August 1992	1.96 m (6 ft 5 in)	Atlanta Hawks	(United States)
SG	9	Vanja Marinković	26 – 9 January 1997	1.98 m (6 ft 6 in)	Saski Baskonia	(Spain)
SF	13	Ognjen Dobrić	28 – 27 October 1994	2.00 m (6 ft 7 in)	Virtus Bologna	(Italy)
C	14	Dušan Ristić	27 – 25 November 1995	2.14 m (7 ft 0 in)	Lenovo Tenerife	(Spain)
SG	23	Marko Gudurić	28 – 8 March 1995	1.96 m (6 ft 5 in)	Fenerbahçe Beko	(Turkey)
PG	24	Stefan Jović	32 – 3 November 1990	1.98 m (6 ft 6 in)	Basket Zaragoza	(Spain)
SF	27	Dejan Davidovac	28 – 17 January 1995	2.03 m (6 ft 8 in)	Crvena zvezda	(Serbia)
PF	28	Boriša Simanić	25 – 20 March 1998	2.11 m (6 ft 11 in)	Basket Zaragoza	(Spain)
PG	30	Aleksa Avramović	28 – 25 October 1994	1.92 m (6 ft 4 in)	Partizan Mozzart Bet	(Serbia)
C	33	Nikola Milutinov	28 – 30 December 1994	2.13 m (7 ft 0 in)	Olympiacos	(Greece)

Head coach

- (Serbia) Svetislav Pešić

Assistant coach(es)

- (Serbia) Nenad Jakovljević
- (Serbia) Saša Kosović
- (Serbia) Oliver Kostić
- (Serbia) Marko Marinović
- (Serbia) Ognjen Stojaković

Legend

- (C) Team captain
- Club – describes last
  club before the tournament
- Age – describes age
  on 25 August 2023

=== South Sudan ===
An 18-player roster was announced on 10 August. The final squad was revealed on 25 August.

South Sudan men's national basketball team – 2023 FIBA Basketball World Cup roster
Players
Coaches

Pos.	No.	Name	Age – Date of birth	Height	Club	Ctr.
SG	0	Junior Madut	26 – 26 March 1997	1.98 m (6 ft 6 in)	Tasmania JackJumpers	(Australia)
SF	1	Nuni Omot	28 – 3 October 1994	2.06 m (6 ft 9 in)	Taichung Suns	(Chinese Taipei)
PG	2	Carlik Jones	25 – 23 December 1997	1.83 m (6 ft 0 in)	Chicago Bulls	(United States)
C	6	Khaman Maluach	16 – 14 September 2006	2.16 m (7 ft 1 in)	AS Douanes	(Senegal)
SF	8	Kuany Kuany (C)	29 – 8 July 1994	2.01 m (6 ft 7 in)	Keilor Thunder	(Australia)
G/F	11	Marial Shayok	28 – 26 July 1995	1.98 m (6 ft 6 in)	Maine Celtics	(United States)
C	12	Deng Acuoth	26 – 2 October 1996	2.08 m (6 ft 10 in)	Knox Raiders	(Australia)
PF	13	Majok Deng	30 – 1 March 1993	2.05 m (6 ft 9 in)	Tasmania JackJumpers	(Australia)
SG	14	Peter Jok	29 – 30 March 1994	1.98 m (6 ft 6 in)	Cholet Basket	(France)
C	21	Koch Bar	26 – 15 September 1996	2.06 m (6 ft 9 in)	BC Minsk	(Belarus)
PF	32	Wenyen Gabriel	26 – 26 March 1997	2.06 m (6 ft 9 in)	Los Angeles Lakers	(United States)
G	44	Sunday Dech	29 – 1 January 1994	1.95 m (6 ft 5 in)	Adelaide 36ers	(Australia)

Head coach

- (United States) Royal Ivey

Assistant coach(es)

- (South Sudan) Luol Deng

Legend

- (C) Team captain
- Club – describes last
  club before the tournament
- Age – describes age
  on 25 August 2023

== Group C ==
=== Greece ===
A 22-player roster was announced on 20 July. On 13 August, it was reduced to 14 players. The final roster was announced on 19 August. Dinos Mitoglou suffered an injury shortly before the tournament and had to withdraw. Because the replacement deadline had passed, Mitoglou could not be replaced.

Greece men's national basketball team – 2023 FIBA Basketball World Cup roster
Players
Coaches

Pos.	No.	Name	Age – Date of birth	Height	Club	Ctr.
PG	0	Thomas Walkup	30 – 30 December 1992	1.93 m (6 ft 4 in)	Olympiacos	(Greece)
SF	1	Nikos Rogkavopoulos	22 – 27 June 2001	2.03 m (6 ft 8 in)	Baskonia	(Spain)
PG	3	Michalis Lountzis	25 – 4 August 1998	1.96 m (6 ft 5 in)	Olympiacos	(Greece)
SG	5	Giannoulis Larentzakis	29 – 22 September 1993	1.96 m (6 ft 5 in)	Olympiacos	(Greece)
SG	6	Dimitrios Moraitis	24 – 3 February 1999	1.93 m (6 ft 4 in)	Panathinaikos	(Greece)
PG	13	Lefteris Bochoridis	29 – 18 April 1994	1.96 m (6 ft 5 in)	Aris	(Greece)
C	14	Georgios Papagiannis	26 – 3 July 1997	2.18 m (7 ft 2 in)	Fenerbahçe	(Turkey)
SF	16	Kostas Papanikolaou (C)	33 – 31 July 1990	2.03 m (6 ft 8 in)	Olympiacos	(Greece)
SF	21	Ioannis Papapetrou	29 – 30 March 1994	2.06 m (6 ft 9 in)	Panathinaikos	(Greece)
PF	43	Thanasis Antetokounmpo	31 – 18 July 1992	2.01 m (6 ft 7 in)	Milwaukee Bucks	(United States)
PF	44	Dinos Mitoglou	27 – 11 June 1996	2.10 m (6 ft 11 in)	Panathinaikos	(Greece)
C	76	Manos Chatzidakis	23 – 21 April 2000	2.08 m (6 ft 10 in)	AEK	(Greece)

Head coach

- (Greece) Dimitrios Itoudis

Assistant coach(es)

- (Greece) Marios Batis
- (Greece) Sotiris Manolopoulos
- (Greece) Savvas Kamberidis
- (Greece) Stefanos Triantafyllos

Legend

- (C) Team captain
- Club – describes last club
  before the tournament
- Age – describes age
  on 25 August 2023

=== Jordan ===
A 17-player roster was announced on 16 August. The roster was finalized on 20 August.

Jordan national basketball team – 2023 FIBA Basketball World Cup roster
Players
Coaches

Pos.	No.	Name	Age – Date of birth	Height	Club	Ctr.
G	1	Amin Abu Hawwas	29 – 26 April 1994	1.94 m (6 ft 4 in)	Al-Ahli	(Jordan)
PG	5	Freddy Ibrahim	26 – 14 October 1996	1.90 m (6 ft 3 in)	Orthodox BC	(Jordan)
SF	7	Ahmad Al-Hamarsheh	36 – 10 October 1986	1.96 m (6 ft 5 in)	Orthodox BC	(Jordan)
SG	9	Sami Bzai	29 – 26 January 1994	1.90 m (6 ft 3 in)	Al-Ahli	(Jordan)
G	11	Ahmad Hammouri	20 – 15 July 2003	1.90 m (6 ft 3 in)	Al Jubaiha	(Jordan)
C	13	Mohammad Hussein	33 – 3 March 1990	2.11 m (6 ft 11 in)	Orthodox BC	(Jordan)
PF	15	Zaid Abbas (C)	39 – 21 November 1983	2.03 m (6 ft 8 in)	Orthodox BC	(Jordan)
SF	21	Hashem Abbas	24 – 30 March 1999	1.95 m (6 ft 5 in)	Al Hilal	(Saudi Arabia)
PG	22	Malek Kanaan	30 – 7 February 1993	1.83 m (6 ft 0 in)	Al Riyadi Amman	(Jordan)
SF	24	Rondae Hollis-Jefferson	28 – 3 January 1995	1.98 m (6 ft 6 in)	Atléticos de San Germán	(Puerto Rico)
PF	35	Zane Al-Najdawi	26 – 26 September 1996	2.03 m (6 ft 8 in)	Al-Ahli	(Jordan)
C	44	Ahmad Al-Dwairi	30 – 4 March 1993	2.13 m (7 ft 0 in)	Bursaspor	(Turkey)

Head coach

- (Jordan) Wesam Al-Sous

Assistant coach(es)

- (Jordan) Mohammad Hadrab

Legend

- (C) Team captain
- Club – describes last
  club before the tournament
- Age – describes age
  on 25 August 2023

=== New Zealand ===
A 14-player roster was announced on 29 June . The final squad was revealed on 24 August.

New Zealand national basketball team – 2023 FIBA Basketball World Cup roster
Players
Coaches

Pos.	No.	Name	Age – Date of birth	Height	Club	Ctr.
F	1	Reuben Te Rangi (C)	28 – 14 October 1994	1.98 m (6 ft 6 in)	South East Melbourne Phoenix	(Australia)
PG	2	Izayah Le'afa	26 – 7 November 1996	1.88 m (6 ft 2 in)	New Zealand Breakers	(New Zealand)
PF	3	Finn Delany	28 – 12 August 1995	2.00 m (6 ft 7 in)	New Zealand Breakers	(New Zealand)
PG	4	Taylor Britt	26 – 22 September 1996	1.88 m (6 ft 2 in)	Canterbury Rams	(New Zealand)
PG	5	Shea Ili	30 – 6 October 1992	1.83 m (6 ft 0 in)	Melbourne United	(Australia)
C	7	Yanni Wetzell	27 – 8 July 1996	2.08 m (6 ft 10 in)	Alba Berlin	(Germany)
G	11	Flynn Cameron	23 – 30 June 2000	1.95 m (6 ft 5 in)	Melbourne United	(Australia)
PF	16	Tohi Smith-Milner	27 – 6 October 1995	2.05 m (6 ft 9 in)	Adelaide 36ers	(Australia)
SF	20	Jordan Ngatai	30 – 7 March 1993	1.96 m (6 ft 5 in)	Hawke's Bay Hawks	(New Zealand)
SF	22	Hyrum Harris	27 – 3 June 1996	2.04 m (6 ft 8 in)	Perth Wildcats	(Australia)
G	23	Walter Brown	20 – 23 May 2003	1.90 m (6 ft 3 in)	Tasmania JackJumpers	(Australia)
F/C	42	Isaac Fotu	29 – 18 December 1993	2.03 m (6 ft 8 in)	Utsunomiya Brex	(Japan)

Head coach

- (New Zealand) Pero Cameron

Assistant coach(es)

- (New Zealand) Zico Coronel
- (New Zealand) Michael Fitchett
- (New Zealand) Aaron Young

Legend

- (C) Team captain
- Club – describes last
  club before the competition
- Age – describes age
  on 25 August 2023

=== United States ===
The roster was announced on 6 July.

United States men's national basketball team – 2023 FIBA Basketball World Cup roster
Players
Coaches

Pos.	No.	Name	Age – Date of birth	Height	Club	Ctr.
G	4	Tyrese Haliburton	23 – 29 February 2000	1.96 m (6 ft 5 in)	Indiana Pacers	(United States)
F	5	Mikal Bridges	26 – 30 August 1996	1.98 m (6 ft 6 in)	Brooklyn Nets	(United States)
F	6	Cameron Johnson	27 – 3 March 1996	2.03 m (6 ft 8 in)	Brooklyn Nets	(United States)
F	7	Brandon Ingram	25 – 2 September 1997	2.03 m (6 ft 8 in)	New Orleans Pelicans	(United States)
PF	8	Paolo Banchero	20 – 12 November 2002	2.08 m (6 ft 10 in)	Orlando Magic	(United States)
C	9	Bobby Portis	28 – 10 February 1995	2.11 m (6 ft 11 in)	Milwaukee Bucks	(United States)
G	10	Anthony Edwards	22 – 5 August 2001	1.93 m (6 ft 4 in)	Minnesota Timberwolves	(United States)
PG	11	Jalen Brunson (C)	26 – 31 August 1996	1.88 m (6 ft 2 in)	New York Knicks	(United States)
SF	12	Josh Hart	28 – 6 March 1995	1.93 m (6 ft 4 in)	New York Knicks	(United States)
F	13	Jaren Jackson Jr.	23 – 15 September 1999	2.08 m (6 ft 10 in)	Memphis Grizzlies	(United States)
C	14	Walker Kessler	22 – 26 July 2001	2.13 m (7 ft 0 in)	Utah Jazz	(United States)
SG	15	Austin Reaves	25 – 29 May 1998	1.96 m (6 ft 5 in)	Los Angeles Lakers	(United States)

Head coach

- (United States) Steve Kerr

Assistant coach(es)

- (United States) Mark Few
- (United States) Tyronn Lue
- (United States) Erik Spoelstra

Legend

- (C) Team captain
- Club – describes last
  club before the competition
- Age – describes age
  on 25 August 2023

== Group D ==
=== Egypt ===
A 20-player roster was announced on 1 August. The final squad was revealed on 22 August.

Egypt men's national basketball team – 2023 FIBA Basketball World Cup roster roster
Players
Coaches

Pos.	No.	Name	Age – Date of birth	Height	Club	Ctr.
G	0	Amr Zahran	21 – 6 October 2001	1.91 m (6 ft 3 in)	Al Ahly	(Egypt)
PG	1	Karim El-Gizawy	18 – 13 January 2005	1.91 m (6 ft 3 in)	Al Ahly	(Egypt)
G	4	Ehab Amin	28 – 1 August 1995	1.85 m (6 ft 1 in)	Al Ahly	(Egypt)
G/F	5	Amr Gendy (C)	32 – 14 June 1991	1.93 m (6 ft 4 in)	Al Ahly	(Egypt)
G	7	Adam Moussa	21 – 14 July 2002	1.90 m (6 ft 3 in)	Tarleton State Texans	(United States)
PF	10	Anas Mahmoud	28 – 9 May 1995	2.14 m (7 ft 0 in)	Al Ittihad	(Egypt)
SG	12	Youssef Aboushousha	30 – 9 June 1993	1.93 m (6 ft 4 in)	Al Ittihad	(Egypt)
C	15	Patrick Gardner	23 – 1 January 2000	2.11 m (6 ft 11 in)	Marist Red Foxes	(United States)
PF	28	Khaled Abdelgawad	24 – 15 February 1999	2.04 m (6 ft 8 in)	Zamalek	(Egypt)
SG	44	Omar Hesham	28 – 29 March 1995	1.91 m (6 ft 3 in)	Zamalek	(Egypt)
C	50	Assem Marei	31 – 16 June 1992	2.06 m (6 ft 9 in)	Changwon LG Sakers	(South Korea)
C	55	Omar Oraby	31 – 8 September 1991	2.18 m (7 ft 2 in)	Al Ahly	(Egypt)

Head coach

- (Canada) Roy Rana

Assistant coach(es)

- (Egypt) Wael Badr
- (Egypt) Mohamed Selim

Legend

- (C) Team captain
- Club – describes last
  club before the tournament
- Age – describes age
  on 25 August 2023

=== Lithuania ===
A 33-player roster was announced on 12 July. It was reduced to 15 on 25 July. The final 12-player roster was unveiled on 15 August.

Lithuania men's national basketball team – 2023 FIBA Basketball World Cup roster
Players
Coaches

Pos.	No.	Name	Age – Date of birth	Height	Club	Ctr.
G	2	Margiris Normantas	26 – 27 October 1996	1.94 m (6 ft 4 in)	BC Rytas	(Lithuania)
SF	8	Tadas Sedekerskis	25 – 17 January 1998	2.06 m (6 ft 9 in)	Baskonia	(Spain)
F	9	Ignas Brazdeikis	24 – 8 January 1999	2.01 m (6 ft 7 in)	Žalgiris	(Lithuania)
C	12	Gabrielius Maldūnas	30 – 19 April 1993	2.06 m (6 ft 9 in)	Lietkabelis	(Lithuania)
PG	13	Rokas Jokubaitis	22 – 19 November 2000	1.94 m (6 ft 4 in)	Barcelona	(Spain)
C	17	Jonas Valančiūnas (C)	31 – 6 May 1992	2.11 m (6 ft 11 in)	New Orleans Pelicans	(United States)
SF	19	Mindaugas Kuzminskas	33 – 19 October 1989	2.05 m (6 ft 9 in)	AEK	(Greece)
C	20	Donatas Motiejūnas	32 – 20 September 1990	2.13 m (7 ft 0 in)	AS Monaco	(Monaco)
F	22	Eimantas Bendžius	33 – 23 April 1990	2.07 m (6 ft 9 in)	Dinamo Sassari	(Italy)
PG	31	Vaidas Kariniauskas	29 – 16 November 1993	1.99 m (6 ft 6 in)	M Basket Mažeikiai	(Lithuania)
SG	33	Tomas Dimša	29 – 2 January 1994	1.96 m (6 ft 5 in)	Žalgiris	(Lithuania)
SF	91	Deividas Sirvydis	23 – 10 June 2000	2.01 m (6 ft 7 in)	Lietkabelis	(Lithuania)

Head coach

- (Lithuania) Kazys Maksvytis

Assistant coach(es)

- (Lithuania) Benas Matkevičius
- (Lithuania) Giedrius Žibėnas

Legend

- (C) Team captain
- Club – describes last club
  before the tournament
- Age – describes age
  on 25 August 2023

=== Mexico ===
A 24-player roster was announced on 13 July. It was reduced to 14 players on 31 July. The final roster was announced on 22 August.

Mexico men's national basketball team – 2023 FIBA Basketball World Cup roster
Players
Coaches

Pos.	No.	Name	Age – Date of birth	Height	Club	Ctr.
F	2	Gael Bonilla	20 – 26 February 2003	2.02 m (6 ft 8 in)	Cáceres Basket	(Spain)
PF	3	Fabián Jaimes	30 – 22 September 1992	1.98 m (6 ft 6 in)	Panteras de Aguascalientes	(Mexico)
PG	4	Paul Stoll	37 – 14 December 1985	1.80 m (5 ft 11 in)	Fuerza Regia de Monterrey	(Mexico)
G	7	Jorge Gutiérrez	34 – 27 December 1988	1.90 m (6 ft 3 in)	Astros de Jalisco	(Mexico)
SG	8	Moisés Andriassi	23 – 1 March 2000	1.87 m (6 ft 2 in)	Astros de Jalisco	(Mexico)
SG	9	Francisco Cruz	33 – 3 October 1989	1.91 m (6 ft 3 in)	Manisa	(Turkey)
G	10	Gabriel Girón (C)	35 – 27 February 1988	1.92 m (6 ft 4 in)	Fuerza Regia de Monterrey	(Mexico)
G	13	Orlando Méndez-Valdez	37 – 29 April 1986	1.83 m (6 ft 0 in)	Plateros de Fresnillo	(Mexico)
PF	15	Jorge Camacho	34 – 16 April 1989	2.01 m (6 ft 7 in)	Rayos de Hermosillo	(Mexico)
C	25	Israel Gutiérrez	30 – 15 January 1993	2.06 m (6 ft 9 in)	Dorados de Chihuahua	(Mexico)
C	34	Joshua Ibarra	28 – 26 January 1995	2.10 m (6 ft 11 in)	Plateros de Fresnillo	(Mexico)
C	44	Daniel Amigo	27 – 13 September 1995	2.08 m (6 ft 10 in)	Libertadores de Querétaro	(Mexico)

Head coach

- (Mexico) Omar Quintero

Assistant coach(es)

- (United States) Kaleb Canales

Legend

- (C) Team captain
- Club – describes last
  club before the tournament
- Age – describes age
  on 25 August 2023

=== Montenegro ===
A 24-player roster was announced on 12 June. It was reduced to 17 players on 21 July. The final squad was revealed on 16 August.

Montenegro men's national basketball team – 2023 FIBA Basketball World Cup roster
Players
Coaches

Pos.	No.	Name	Age – Date of birth	Height	Club	Ctr.
PF	2	Aleksa Ilić	26 – 17 September 1996	2.04 m (6 ft 8 in)	Budućnost	(Montenegro)
SG	3	Vladimir Mihailović	33 – 10 August 1990	1.93 m (6 ft 4 in)	Budućnost	(Montenegro)
C	4	Nikola Vučević	32 – 24 October 1990	2.08 m (6 ft 10 in)	Chicago Bulls	(United States)
SG	7	Andrija Slavković	24 – 15 February 1999	2.02 m (6 ft 8 in)	Budućnost	(Montenegro)
F	8	Dino Radončić	24 – 8 January 1999	2.03 m (6 ft 8 in)	Bayern Munich	(Germany)
PF	11	Nemanja Radović	31 – 11 November 1991	2.08 m (6 ft 10 in)	Murcia	(Spain)
C	14	Bojan Dubljević (C)	31 – 24 October 1991	2.05 m (6 ft 9 in)	Zenit Saint Petersburg	(Russia)
C	19	Marko Simonović	23 – 15 October 1999	2.13 m (7 ft 0 in)	Crvena zvezda	(Serbia)
G	20	Nikola Ivanović	29 – 19 February 1994	1.90 m (6 ft 3 in)	Runa Basket Moscow	(Russia)
PG	22	Igor Drobnjak	23 – 21 April 2000	1.93 m (6 ft 4 in)	SC Derby	(Montenegro)
G	30	Petar Popović	26 – 13 September 1996	1.93 m (6 ft 4 in)	Budućnost	(Montenegro)
PG	55	Kendrick Perry	30 – 23 December 1992	1.83 m (6 ft 0 in)	Unicaja	(Spain)

Head coach

- (Montenegro) Boško Radović

Assistant coach(es)

- (Montenegro) Boško Boškovič
- (Montenegro) Lazar Mašanović
- (Montenegro) Vladimir Todorović

Legend

- (C) Team captain
- Club – describes last
  club before the competition
- Age – describes age
  on 25 August 2023

== Group E ==
=== Australia ===
An 18-player roster was announced on 8 May. It was reduced to 15 players on 6 August. It was reduced again to 13 players on 9 August. The final squad was revealed on 23 August.

Australia men's national basketball team – 2023 FIBA Basketball World Cup roster
Players
Coaches

Pos.	No.	Name	Age – Date of birth	Height	Club	Ctr.
PG	1	Dyson Daniels	20 – 17 March 2003	2.03 m (6 ft 8 in)	New Orleans Pelicans	(United States)
SF	2	Matisse Thybulle	26 – 4 March 1997	1.96 m (6 ft 5 in)	Portland Trail Blazers	(United States)
G	3	Josh Giddey	20 – 10 October 2002	2.03 m (6 ft 8 in)	Oklahoma City Thunder	(United States)
SG	4	Chris Goulding	34 – 24 October 1988	1.92 m (6 ft 4 in)	Melbourne United	(Australia)
G	5	Patty Mills (C)	35 – 11 August 1988	1.83 m (6 ft 0 in)	Atlanta Hawks	(United States)
SF	6	Josh Green	22 – 16 November 2000	2.01 m (6 ft 7 in)	Dallas Mavericks	(United States)
SF	7	Joe Ingles	35 – 2 October 1987	2.06 m (6 ft 9 in)	Orlando Magic	(United States)
F	9	Xavier Cooks	28 – 19 August 1995	2.03 m (6 ft 8 in)	Washington Wizards	(United States)
PG	11	Dante Exum	28 – 13 July 1995	1.96 m (6 ft 5 in)	Dallas Mavericks	(United States)
SF	14	Jack White	26 – 5 August 1997	2.00 m (6 ft 7 in)	Oklahoma City Thunder	(United States)
PF	15	Nick Kay	31 – 3 August 1992	2.06 m (6 ft 9 in)	Shimane Susanoo Magic	(Japan)
C	26	Duop Reath	27 – 26 June 1996	2.11 m (6 ft 11 in)	Al Riyadi	(Lebanon)

Head coach

- (United States) Brian Goorjian

Assistant coach(es)

- (Australia) Adam Caporn
- (Australia) Matthew Nielsen
- (Australia) David Patrick

Legend

- (C) Team captain
- Club – describes last
  club before the tournament
- Age – describes age
  on 25 August 2023

=== Finland ===
A 22-player roster was announced on 19 July. The final group was revealed on 18 August.

Finland men's national basketball team – 2023 FIBA Basketball World Cup roster
Players
Coaches

Pos.	No.	Name	Age – Date of birth	Height	Club	Ctr.
G	1	Miro Little	19 – 30 May 2004	1.93 m (6 ft 4 in)	Baylor Bears	(United States)
F	5	Alex Murphy	30 – 3 June 1993	2.06 m (6 ft 9 in)	Estudiantes	(Spain)
SG	9	Sasu Salin (C)	32 – 11 June 1991	1.91 m (6 ft 3 in)	Tenerife	(Spain)
PF	13	Olivier Nkamhoua	23 – 2 May 2000	2.03 m (6 ft 8 in)	Michigan Wolverines	(United States)
SF	14	Henri Kantonen	26 – 20 August 1997	1.98 m (6 ft 6 in)	Kauhajoki	(Finland)
F	18	Mikael Jantunen	23 – 20 April 2000	2.04 m (6 ft 8 in)	Paris	(France)
SF	19	Elias Valtonen	24 – 11 June 1999	2.01 m (6 ft 7 in)	Bàsquet Manresa	(Spain)
C	20	Alexander Madsen	28 – 26 January 1995	2.07 m (6 ft 9 in)	AEK Athens	(Greece)
PG	21	Edon Maxhuni	25 – 21 March 1998	1.88 m (6 ft 2 in)	Crailsheim Merlins	(Germany)
PF	23	Lauri Markkanen	26 – 22 May 1997	2.13 m (7 ft 0 in)	Utah Jazz	(United States)
SG	34	Jacob Grandison	25 – 2 April 1998	1.98 m (6 ft 6 in)	KK Cibona	(Croatia)
G	35	Ilari Seppälä	30 – 23 March 1993	1.88 m (6 ft 2 in)	Saint-Chamond	(France)

Head coach

- (Finland) Lassi Tuovi

Assistant coach(es)

- (Finland) Hanno Möttölä
- (Finland) Mikko Larkas

Legend

- (C) Team captain
- Club – describes last
  club before the competition
- Age – describes age
  on 25 August 2023

=== Germany ===
An 18-player roster was announced on 12 June. It was reduced to 14 players on 7 August, and the final roster was announced on 10 August.

Germany men's national basketball team – 2023 FIBA Basketball World Cup roster
Players
Coaches

Pos.	No.	Name	Age – Date of birth	Height	Club	Ctr.
SF	0	Isaac Bonga	23 – 8 November 1999	2.03 m (6 ft 8 in)	Bayern Munich	(Germany)
PG	4	Maodo Lô	30 – 31 December 1992	1.91 m (6 ft 3 in)	Olimpia Milano	(Italy)
G/F	5	Niels Giffey	32 – 8 June 1991	2.00 m (6 ft 7 in)	Bayern Munich	(Germany)
C	7	Johannes Voigtmann	30 – 30 September 1992	2.11 m (6 ft 11 in)	Olimpia Milano	(Italy)
G/F	9	Franz Wagner	21 – 27 August 2001	2.08 m (6 ft 10 in)	Orlando Magic	(United States)
F/C	10	Daniel Theis	31 – 4 April 1992	2.03 m (6 ft 8 in)	Indiana Pacers	(United States)
F/C	13	Moritz Wagner	26 – 26 April 1997	2.11 m (6 ft 11 in)	Orlando Magic	(United States)
PG	17	Dennis Schröder (C)	29 – 15 September 1993	1.85 m (6 ft 1 in)	Toronto Raptors	(Canada)
PG	21	Justus Hollatz	22 – 21 April 2001	1.91 m (6 ft 3 in)	Anadolu Efes	(Turkey)
PF	32	Johannes Thiemann	29 – 9 February 1994	2.05 m (6 ft 9 in)	Alba Berlin	(Germany)
SG	42	Andreas Obst	27 – 13 July 1996	1.91 m (6 ft 3 in)	Bayern Munich	(Germany)
SG	44	David Krämer	26 – 14 January 1997	1.96 m (6 ft 5 in)	Covirán Granada	(Spain)

Head coach

- (Canada) / (Finland) Gordon Herbert

Assistant coach(es)

- (Germany) Klaus Perwas
- (United States) Bret Brielmaier

Legend

- (C) Team captain
- Club – describes last
  club before the tournament
- Age – describes age
  on 25 August 2023

=== Japan ===
A 25-player roster was announced on 19 June. The final roster was revealed on 21 August.

Japan national basketball team – 2023 FIBA Basketball World Cup roster
Players
Coaches

Pos.	No.	Name	Age – Date of birth	Height	Club	Ctr.
PG	2	Yuki Togashi (C)	30 – 30 July 1993	1.67 m (5 ft 6 in)	Chiba Jets	(Japan)
PG	5	Yuki Kawamura	22 – 2 May 2001	1.72 m (5 ft 8 in)	Yokohama B-Corsairs	(Japan)
SG	6	Makoto Hiejima	33 – 11 August 1990	1.91 m (6 ft 3 in)	Utsunomiya Brex	(Japan)
SF	12	Yuta Watanabe	28 – 13 October 1994	2.06 m (6 ft 9 in)	Phoenix Suns	(United States)
SG	18	Yudai Baba	27 – 7 November 1995	1.95 m (6 ft 5 in)	Texas Legends	(United States)
SG	19	Yudai Nishida	24 – 13 March 1999	1.90 m (6 ft 3 in)	SeaHorses Mikawa	(Japan)
C	24	Josh Hawkinson	28 – 23 June 1995	2.08 m (6 ft 10 in)	Shinshu Brave Warriors	(Japan)
G	30	Keisei Tominaga	22 – 1 February 2001	1.88 m (6 ft 2 in)	Nebraska Cornhuskers	(United States)
SF	31	Shuta Hara	29 – 17 December 1993	1.87 m (6 ft 2 in)	Chiba Jets	(Japan)
PF	75	Soichiro Inoue	24 – 7 May 1999	2.01 m (6 ft 7 in)	Sun Rockers Shibuya	(Japan)
SF	91	Hirotaka Yoshii	25 – 4 June 1998	1.96 m (6 ft 5 in)	Alvark Tokyo	(Japan)
C	99	Koya Kawamata	25 – 16 June 1998	2.04 m (6 ft 8 in)	Shiga Lakes	(Japan)

Head coach

- (United States) Tom Hovasse

Assistant coach(es)

- (United States) Corey Gaines
- (Japan) Geoffrey Katsuhisa
- (Japan) Yoshio Sasa

Legend

- (C) Team captain
- Club – describes last
  club before the tournament
- Age – describes age
  on 25 August 2023

== Group F ==
=== Cape Verde ===
A 15-player roster was announced on 4 August. The final roster was announced on 23 August.

Cape Verde men's national basketball team – 2023 FIBA Basketball World Cup roster
Players
Coaches

Pos.	No.	Name	Age – Date of birth	Height	Club	Ctr.
SG	0	Patrick Lima	28 – 2 May 1995	1.90 m (6 ft 3 in)	CB Almería	(Spain)
PG	5	Shane Da Rosa	35 – 23 April 1988	1.85 m (6 ft 1 in)	Providence Pirates	(United States)
F	6	Ivan Almeida	34 – 10 May 1989	1.97 m (6 ft 6 in)	Benfica	(Portugal)
PG	7	Fidel Mendonça (C)	39 – 7 July 1984	1.89 m (6 ft 2 in)	Prédio Basketball	(Cape Verde)
SG	8	Anderson Correia	25 – 31 October 1997	1.95 m (6 ft 5 in)	Sangalhos DC	(Portugal)
SF	9	Joel Almeida	37 – 11 October 1985	1.92 m (6 ft 4 in)	FAP	(Cameroon)
PF	10	Kenneti Mendes	33 – 17 August 1990	2.03 m (6 ft 8 in)	Providence Pirates	(United States)
F	13	Will Tavares	28 – 18 July 1995	1.95 m (6 ft 5 in)	BC Yambol	(Bulgaria)
SF	15	Kevin Coronel	31 – 3 September 1991	1.96 m (6 ft 5 in)	Portimonense	(Portugal)
C	16	Keven Gomes	27 – 29 October 1995	2.11 m (6 ft 11 in)	FC Porto	(Portugal)
SF	21	João Gomes	38 – 5 February 1985	2.03 m (6 ft 8 in)	Benfica	(Portugal)
C	22	Edy Tavares	31 – 22 March 1992	2.21 m (7 ft 3 in)	Real Madrid	(Spain)

Head coach

- (Angola) Emanuel Trovoada

Assistant coach(es)

- (Cape Verde) Manuel Duarte
- (Cape Verde) Danielson Miranda

Legend

- (C) Team captain
- Club – describes last
  club before the competition
- Age – describes age
  on 25 August 2023

=== Georgia ===
A 18-player roster was announced on 12 July. The final roster was unveiled on 16 August.

Georgia men's national basketball team – 2023 FIBA Basketball World Cup roster
Players
Coaches

Pos.	No.	Name	Age – Date of birth	Height	Club	Ctr.
PG	4	Rati Andronikashvili	22 – 19 March 2001	1.93 m (6 ft 4 in)	UCAM Murcia	(Spain)
PF	5	Sandro Mamukelashvili	24 – 23 May 1999	2.08 m (6 ft 10 in)	San Antonio Spurs	(United States)
SF	6	Kakhaber Jintcharadze	30 – 16 July 1993	1.97 m (6 ft 6 in)	Kutaisi	(Georgia (country))
PG	7	Luka Liklikadze	20 – 14 July 2003	1.86 m (6 ft 1 in)	Olimpi Tbilisi	(Georgia (country))
PG	8	Giorgi Tsintsadze	37 – 7 February 1986	1.92 m (6 ft 4 in)	Tbilisi St University	(Georgia (country))
C	9	Giorgi Shermadini	34 – 2 April 1989	2.17 m (7 ft 1 in)	Lenovo Tenerife	(Spain)
SG	10	Duda Sanadze	31 – 25 July 1992	1.97 m (6 ft 6 in)	ASE	(Hungary)
C	11	Giorgi Turdziladze	25 – 21 October 1997	2.06 m (6 ft 9 in)	Tbilisi St University	(Georgia (country))
SF	17	Mikheil Berishvili	36 – 12 April 1987	2.04 m (6 ft 8 in)	Kutaisi	(Georgia (country))
PF	23	Tornike Shengelia (C)	31 – 5 October 1991	2.06 m (6 ft 9 in)	Virtus Bologna	(Italy)
PG	25	Thad McFadden	36 – 29 May 1987	1.88 m (6 ft 2 in)	UCAM Murcia	(Spain)
C	35	Goga Bitadze	24 – 20 July 1999	2.11 m (6 ft 11 in)	Orlando Magic	(United States)

Head coach

- (Greece) Ilias Zouros

Assistant coach(es)

- (Georgia (country)) Anatoli Boisa
- (Georgia (country)) Manuchar Markoishvili

Legend

- (C) Team captain
- Club – describes last
  club before the competition
- Age – describes age
  on 25 August 2023

=== Slovenia ===
A 20-player roster was announced on 3 July. The final roster was unveiled on 14 August.

Slovenia men's national basketball team – 2023 FIBA Basketball World Cup roster
Players
Coaches

Pos.	No.	Name	Age – Date of birth	Height	Club	Ctr.
PG	4	Žiga Samar	22 – 26 January 2001	1.97 m (6 ft 6 in)	Alba Berlin	(Germany)
PG	6	Aleksej Nikolić	28 – 21 February 1995	1.91 m (6 ft 3 in)	Élan Chalon	(France)
PG	7	Klemen Prepelič	30 – 20 October 1992	1.92 m (6 ft 4 in)	Valencia	(Spain)
C	10	Mike Tobey	28 – 10 October 1994	2.13 m (7 ft 0 in)	Crvena Zvezda	(Serbia)
G	11	Jaka Blažič	33 – 30 June 1990	1.96 m (6 ft 5 in)	Cedevita Olimpija	(Slovenia)
SG	15	Gregor Hrovat	29 – 18 August 1994	1.96 m (6 ft 5 in)	Dijon	(France)
C	27	Žiga Dimec	30 – 20 February 1993	2.10 m (6 ft 11 in)	Nishinomiya Storks	(Japan)
SG	30	Zoran Dragić	34 – 22 June 1989	1.96 m (6 ft 5 in)	Cedevita Olimpija	(Slovenia)
PF	32	Bine Prepelič	22 – 5 August 2001	2.00 m (6 ft 7 in)	Spirou	(Belgium)
SG	33	Gregor Glas	22 – 29 April 2001	1.98 m (6 ft 6 in)	Cedevita Olimpija	(Slovenia)
SF	55	Jakob Čebašek	32 – 28 April 1991	2.00 m (6 ft 7 in)	BC Minsk	(Belarus)
SG	77	Luka Dončić (C)	24 – 28 February 1999	2.01 m (6 ft 7 in)	Dallas Mavericks	(United States)

Head coach

- (Slovenia) Aleksander Sekulić

Assistant coach(es)

- (Slovenia) Dalibor Damjanović

Legend

- (C) Team captain
- Club – describes last
  club before the tournament
- Age – describes age
  on 25 August 2023

=== Venezuela ===
A 21-player roster was announced on 18 July. The final roster was announced on 24 August.

Venezuela men's national basketball team – 2023 FIBA Basketball World Cup roster
Players
Coaches

Pos.	No.	Name	Age – Date of birth	Height	Club	Ctr.
PG	5	Gregory Vargas	37 – 18 February 1986	1.80 m (5 ft 11 in)	Gladiadores de Anzoátegui	(Venezuela)
SF	6	Garly Sojo	23 – 23 September 1999	1.95 m (6 ft 5 in)	Broncos de Caracas	(Venezuela)
SF	7	Jhornan Zamora	34 – 30 January 1989	1.96 m (6 ft 5 in)	Trotamundos	(Venezuela)
PG	8	David Cubillán (C)	36 – 27 July 1987	1.82 m (6 ft 0 in)	Guaiqueríes de Margarita	(Venezuela)
SG	9	Pedro Chourio	33 – 13 March 1990	1.86 m (6 ft 1 in)	Cocodrilos de Caracas	(Venezuela)
PF	14	Miguel Ruiz	32 – 20 December 1990	2.02 m (6 ft 8 in)	Guaros de Lara	(Venezuela)
C	15	Windi Graterol	36 – 10 September 1986	2.04 m (6 ft 8 in)	Guaiqueríes de Margarita	(Venezuela)
PG	19	Heissler Guillent	36 – 17 December 1986	1.83 m (6 ft 0 in)	Guaros de Lara	(Venezuela)
PG	20	Yohanner Sifontes	28 – 19 August 1995	1.88 m (6 ft 2 in)	Piratas de La Guaira	(Venezuela)
PF	24	Michael Carrera	30 – 7 January 1993	1.96 m (6 ft 5 in)	Estudiantes	(Spain)
SF	35	José Materán	27 – 17 August 1996	1.96 m (6 ft 5 in)	Gaiteros del Zulia	(Venezuela)
PF	43	Néstor Colmenares	35 – 5 September 1987	2.03 m (6 ft 8 in)	Trotamundos	(Venezuela)

Head coach

- (Argentina) Fernando Duró

Assistant coach(es)

- (Argentina) Pablo Favarel

Legend

- (C) Team captain
- Club – describes last
  club before the tournament
- Age – describes age
  on 25 August 2023

== Group G ==
=== Brazil ===
A 25-player roster was announced on 21 June. The group was reduced to 14 players on 2 August. The final roster was announced on 21 August. Raul Neto suffered an injury during the first game and was ruled out for the remainder of the tournament.

Brazil men's national basketball team – 2023 FIBA Basketball World Cup roster
Players
Coaches

Pos.	No.	Name	Age – Date of birth	Height	Club	Ctr.
PG	2	Yago dos Santos	24 – 9 March 1999	1.78 m (5 ft 10 in)	Crvena Zvezda	(Serbia)
C	6	Cristiano Felício	31 – 7 July 1992	2.06 m (6 ft 9 in)	Covirán Granada	(Spain)
SG	8	Vítor Benite	33 – 20 February 1990	1.94 m (6 ft 4 in)	Palencia Baloncesto	(Spain)
PG	9	Marcelinho Huertas (C)	40 – 25 May 1983	1.91 m (6 ft 3 in)	Iberostar Tenerife	(Spain)
C	10	Tim Soares	26 – 4 February 1997	2.11 m (6 ft 11 in)	Nagoya Dolphins	(Japan)
SG	11	Gui Santos	21 – 22 June 2002	1.97 m (6 ft 6 in)	Santa Cruz Warriors	(United States)
SF	14	Léonardo Meindl	30 – 20 March 1993	2.01 m (6 ft 7 in)	Alvark Tokyo	(Japan)
PG	19	Raul Neto	31 – 19 May 1992	1.85 m (6 ft 1 in)	Fenerbahçe	(Turkey)
C	23	Felipe dos Anjos	25 – 30 April 1998	2.18 m (7 ft 2 in)	Morabanc Andorra	(Andorra)
PG	32	Georginho	27 – 24 May 1996	1.96 m (6 ft 5 in)	Ratiopharm Ulm	(Germany)
PF	50	Bruno Caboclo	27 – 21 September 1995	2.06 m (6 ft 9 in)	Reyer Venezia	(Italy)
PF	99	Lucas Dias	28 – 6 July 1995	2.07 m (6 ft 9 in)	Franca	(Brazil)

Head coach

- (Brazil) Gustavo de Conti

Assistant coach(es)

- (Brazil) Hélinho Rubens

Legend

- (C) Team captain
- Club – describes last
  club before the tournament
- Age – describes age
  on 25 August 2023

=== Iran ===
A 27-player roster was announced on 9 June. It was reduced to 15 on 31 July. The final roster was announced on 21 August.

Iran men's national basketball team – 2023 FIBA Basketball World Cup roster
Players
Coaches

Pos.	No.	Name	Age – Date of birth	Height	Club	Ctr.
G	3	Sina Vahedi	22 – 8 January 2001	1.85 m (6 ft 1 in)	Kalleh	(Iran)
C	4	Meisam Mirzaei	31 – 15 April 1992	2.08 m (6 ft 10 in)	Kalleh	(Iran)
G	5	Sajjad Mashayekhi	29 – 23 February 1994	1.80 m (5 ft 11 in)	Zob Ahan Isfahan	(Iran)
F	6	Mohammad Amini	18 – 26 April 2005	2.01 m (6 ft 7 in)	Monaco	(Monaco)
SF	7	Navid Rezaeifar	27 – 23 August 1996	1.93 m (6 ft 4 in)	Palayesh Naft Abadan	(Iran)
PG	8	Behnam Yakhchali	28 – 12 July 1995	1.91 m (6 ft 3 in)	Gladiators Treves	(Germany)
SF	10	Piter Girgoorian	21 – 27 February 2002	1.99 m (6 ft 6 in)	Mahram Tehran	(Iran)
PF	14	Arsalan Kazemi	33 – 22 April 1990	2.01 m (6 ft 7 in)	Zob Ahan Isfahan	(Iran)
C	15	Hamed Haddadi (C)	38 – 19 May 1985	2.18 m (7 ft 2 in)	Sichuan Blue Whales	(China)
SG	17	Matin Aghajanpour	22 – 14 March 2001	1.98 m (6 ft 6 in)	Kalleh	(Iran)
PF	30	Jalal Aghamiri	22 – 29 January 2001	2.02 m (6 ft 8 in)	Kalleh	(Iran)
C	32	Hassan Aliakbari	27 – 7 July 1996	2.18 m (7 ft 2 in)	Parsa	(Iran)

Head coach

- (Turkey) Hakan Demir

Assistant coach(es)

- (Iran) Ali Arezoomandi

Legend

- (C) Team captain
- Club – describes last
  club before the tournament
- Age – describes age
  on 25 August 2023

=== Ivory Coast ===
A 31-player roster was announced on 15 June. The group was reduced to 13 players on 12 August, and was finalized on 20 August.

Ivory Coast men's national basketball team – 2023 FIBA Basketball World Cup roster
Players
Coaches

Pos.	No.	Name	Age – Date of birth	Height	Club	Ctr.
PG	0	Assémian Moularé	20 – 21 January 2003	1.87 m (6 ft 2 in)	Vichy-Clermont	(France)
SF	1	Charles Abouo	33 – 4 November 1989	1.96 m (6 ft 5 in)	Le Portel	(France)
SG	2	Bazoumana Koné	29 – 13 December 1993	1.96 m (6 ft 5 in)	Karlsruhe Lions	(Germany)
PF	3	Amadou Sidibé	29 – 25 March 1994	2.03 m (6 ft 8 in)	Força Lleida	(Spain)
C	4	Patrick Tapé	25 – 8 June 1998	2.08 m (6 ft 10 in)	Caledonia Gladiators	(United Kingdom)
SG	7	Maxence Dadiet	24 – 2 March 1999	1.92 m (6 ft 4 in)	Toulouse	(France)
F	8	Mike Fofana	25 – 5 October 1997	2.06 m (6 ft 9 in)	ABC Fighters	(Ivory Coast)
PG	10	Solo Diabate	36 – 21 July 1987	1.83 m (6 ft 0 in)	Petro de Luanda	(Angola)
SF	12	Vafessa Fofana	31 – 12 June 1992	2.00 m (6 ft 7 in)	Gravelines-Dunkerque	(France)
C	23	Cédric Bah (C)	29 – 11 May 1994	2.00 m (6 ft 7 in)	Vichy-Clermont	(France)
SG	45	Nisre Zouzoua	27 – 16 July 1996	1.92 m (6 ft 4 in)	Aix Maurienne	(France)
SF	77	Jean-Philippe Dally	27 – 8 March 1996	2.01 m (6 ft 7 in)	Champagne Basket	(France)

Head coach

- (Slovenia) Dejan Prokić

Assistant coach(es)

- (Serbia) Miloš Gligorijević

Legend

- (C) Team captain
- Club – describes last
  club before the tournament
- Age – describes age
  on 25 August 2023

=== Spain ===
A 16-player roster was announced on 5 July. Ricky Rubio withdrew due to mental health problems on 5 August 2023. The final roster was announced on 19 August.

Spain men's national basketball team – 2023 FIBA Basketball World Cup roster
Players
Coaches

Pos.	No.	Name	Age – Date of birth	Height	Club	Ctr.
PG	4	Alberto Díaz	29 – 23 April 1994	1.90 m (6 ft 3 in)	Unicaja Málaga	(Spain)
SF	5	Rudy Fernández (C)	38 – 4 April 1985	1.96 m (6 ft 5 in)	Real Madrid	(Spain)
SG	8	Darío Brizuela	28 – 8 November 1994	1.85 m (6 ft 1 in)	Barcelona	(Spain)
F	10	Víctor Claver	34 – 30 August 1988	2.07 m (6 ft 9 in)	Valencia Basket	(Spain)
C	12	Santi Aldama	22 – 10 January 2001	2.11 m (6 ft 11 in)	Memphis Grizzlies	(United States)
C	14	Willy Hernangómez	29 – 27 May 1994	2.11 m (6 ft 11 in)	Barcelona	(Spain)
F	16	Usman Garuba	21 – 9 March 2002	2.03 m (6 ft 8 in)	Houston Rockets	(United States)
SF	21	Álex Abrines	30 – 1 August 1993	1.98 m (6 ft 6 in)	Barcelona	(Spain)
G	23	Sergio Llull	35 – 15 November 1987	1.90 m (6 ft 3 in)	Real Madrid	(Spain)
PG	24	Juan Núñez	19 – 4 June 2004	1.91 m (6 ft 3 in)	Ratiopharm Ulm	(Germany)
F	41	Juancho Hernangómez	27 – 28 September 1995	2.06 m (6 ft 9 in)	Panathinaikos	(Greece)
PF	44	Joel Parra	23 – 4 April 2000	2.01 m (6 ft 7 in)	Barcelona	(Spain)

Head coach

- (Italy) Sergio Scariolo

Assistant coach(es)

- (Spain) Manuel Aller
- (Spain) Víctor García
- (Spain) Luis Guil
- (Spain) Ángel Sánchez-Cañete

Legend

- (C) Team captain
- Club – describes last
  club before the tournament
- Age – describes age
  on 25 August 2023

== Group H ==
=== Canada ===
An 18-player roster was announced on 13 July. The group was reduced to 14 players on 7 August. The final roster was announced on 24 August.

Canada men's national basketball team – 2023 FIBA Basketball World Cup roster
Players
Coaches

Pos.	No.	Name	Age – Date of birth	Height	Club	Ctr.
G	0	Luguentz Dort	24 – 19 April 1999	1.94 m (6 ft 4 in)	Oklahoma City Thunder	(United States)
SG	1	Nickeil Alexander-Walker	24 – 2 September 1998	1.96 m (6 ft 5 in)	Minnesota Timberwolves	(United States)
G	2	Shai Gilgeous-Alexander	25 – 12 July 1998	1.98 m (6 ft 6 in)	Oklahoma City Thunder	(United States)
F	3	Melvin Ejim	32 – 4 March 1991	2.01 m (6 ft 7 in)	Unicaja	(Spain)
C	7	Dwight Powell	32 – 20 July 1991	2.08 m (6 ft 10 in)	Dallas Mavericks	(United States)
SF	9	RJ Barrett	23 – 14 June 2000	1.95 m (6 ft 5 in)	New York Knicks	(United States)
F	11	Kyle Alexander	26 – 21 October 1996	2.07 m (6 ft 9 in)	Hapoel Tel Aviv	(Israel)
F	13	Kelly Olynyk (C)	32 – 19 April 1991	2.11 m (6 ft 11 in)	Utah Jazz	(United States)
C	15	Zach Edey	21 – 14 May 2002	2.24 m (7 ft 4 in)	Purdue Boilermakers	(United States)
G	23	Phil Scrubb	30 – 27 November 1992	1.94 m (6 ft 4 in)	Bahçeşehir	(Turkey)
SF	24	Dillon Brooks	27 – 22 January 1996	1.98 m (6 ft 6 in)	Houston Rockets	(United States)
PG	25	Trae Bell-Haynes	27 – 5 September 1995	1.88 m (6 ft 2 in)	Basket Zaragoza	(Spain)

Head coach

- (Spain) Jordi Fernández

Assistant coach(es)

- (Canada) Philip Jevtovic
- (Canada) Michael Meeks
- (Canada) Nathaniel Mitchell

Legend

- (C) Team captain
- Club – describes last
  club before the tournament
- Age – describes age
  on 25 August 2023

=== France ===
The roster was announced on 28 June. Frank Ntilikina withdrew due to an injury and was replaced by Isaia Cordinier.

France men's national basketball team – 2023 FIBA Basketball World Cup roster
Players
Coaches

Pos.	No.	Name	Age – Date of birth	Height	Club	Ctr.
PG	00	Sylvain Francisco	25 – 10 October 1997	1.86 m (6 ft 1 in)	Bayern Munich	(Germany)
PG	0	Élie Okobo	25 – 23 October 1997	1.91 m (6 ft 3 in)	Monaco	(Monaco)
SF	5	Nicolas Batum (C)	34 – 14 December 1988	2.03 m (6 ft 8 in)	Los Angeles Clippers	(United States)
PF	7	Guerschon Yabusele	27 – 17 December 1995	2.04 m (6 ft 8 in)	Real Madrid	(Spain)
SG	10	Evan Fournier	30 – 29 October 1992	2.01 m (6 ft 7 in)	New York Knicks	(United States)
SG	12	Nando de Colo	36 – 23 June 1987	1.96 m (6 ft 5 in)	ASVEL	(France)
SF	22	Terry Tarpey	29 – 2 March 1994	1.95 m (6 ft 5 in)	Monaco	(Monaco)
SG	24	Yakuba Ouattara	31 – 24 January 1992	1.91 m (6 ft 3 in)	Monaco	(Monaco)
C	26	Mathias Lessort	27 – 29 September 1995	2.06 m (6 ft 9 in)	Panathinaikos	(Greece)
C	27	Rudy Gobert	31 – 26 June 1992	2.16 m (7 ft 1 in)	Minnesota Timberwolves	(United States)
SG	30	Isaïa Cordinier	26 – 28 November 1996	1.96 m (6 ft 5 in)	Virtus Bologna	(Italy)
C	93	Moustapha Fall	31 – 23 February 1992	2.18 m (7 ft 2 in)	Olympiacos	(Greece)

Head coach

- (France) Vincent Collet

Assistant coach(es)

- (France) Pascal Donnadieu
- (France) Laurent Foirest
- (France) Ruddy Nelhomme

Legend

- (C) Team captain
- Club – describes last
  club before the tournament
- Age – describes age
  on 25 August 2023

=== Latvia ===
A 24-player roster was announced on 28 June. It was reduced to 14 players on 16 August. The final roster was announced on 22 August.

Latvia men's national basketball team – 2023 FIBA Basketball World Cup roster
Players
Coaches

Pos.	No.	Name	Age – Date of birth	Height	Club	Ctr.
F	00	Rodions Kurucs	25 – 5 February 1998	2.06 m (6 ft 9 in)	UCAM Murcia	(Spain)
F	8	Dāvis Bertāns	30 – 12 November 1992	2.08 m (6 ft 10 in)	Oklahoma City Thunder	(United States)
G	9	Dairis Bertāns (C)	33 – 9 September 1989	1.93 m (6 ft 4 in)	VEF Rīga	(Latvia)
F	11	Rolands Šmits	28 – 25 June 1995	2.07 m (6 ft 9 in)	Žalgiris	(Lithuania)
F	12	Artūrs Strautiņš	24 – 23 October 1998	1.98 m (6 ft 6 in)	Derthona Basket	(Italy)
C	18	Klāvs Čavars	27 – 11 February 1996	2.08 m (6 ft 10 in)	Yokohama Excellence	(Japan)
G	21	Aigars Šķēle	30 – 4 December 1992	1.92 m (6 ft 4 in)	Stal Ostrów Wielkopolski	(Poland)
F	24	Andrejs Gražulis	30 – 21 July 1993	2.02 m (6 ft 8 in)	Trento	(Italy)
C	32	Anžejs Pasečņiks	27 – 20 December 1995	2.18 m (7 ft 2 in)	Real Betis	(Spain)
G	47	Artūrs Kurucs	23 – 19 January 2000	1.93 m (6 ft 4 in)	Promitheas Patras	(Greece)
G	55	Artūrs Žagars	23 – 21 April 2000	1.90 m (6 ft 3 in)	Nevėžis	(Lithuania)
G	66	Kristers Zoriks	25 – 25 May 1998	1.93 m (6 ft 4 in)	Petkim Spor	(Turkey)

Head coach

- (Italy) Luca Banchi

Assistant coach(es)

- (Latvia) Jānis Gailītis
- (Latvia) Artūrs Visockis-Rubenis

Legend

- (C) Team captain
- Club – describes last
  club before the tournament
- Age – describes age
  on 25 August 2023

=== Lebanon ===
A 16-player roster was announced on 21 July. The final roster was announced on 23 August.

Lebanon men's national basketball team – 2023 FIBA Basketball World Cup roster
Players
Coaches

Pos.	No.	Name	Age – Date of birth	Height	Club	Ctr.
F	00	Mark Alkhoury	25 – 22 February 1998	1.96 m (6 ft 5 in)	Dynamo Lebanon	(Lebanon)
PF	4	Omari Spellman	26 – 21 July 1997	2.05 m (6 ft 9 in)	Anyang KGC	(South Korea)
SG	5	Amir Saoud	32 – 18 January 1991	1.87 m (6 ft 2 in)	Al Riyadi	(Lebanon)
PG	6	Jad Khalil	26 – 20 November 1996	1.85 m (6 ft 1 in)	Dynamo Lebanon	(Lebanon)
SG	7	Karim Zeinoun	24 – 16 June 1999	1.88 m (6 ft 2 in)	Al Riyadi	(Lebanon)
SG	9	Sergio El Darwich	27 – 25 July 1996	1.94 m (6 ft 4 in)	Beirut Club	(Lebanon)
PG	10	Ali Mansour	25 – 1 January 1998	1.85 m (6 ft 1 in)	Al Riyadi	(Lebanon)
PF	11	Ali Haidar (C)	33 – 20 July 1990	2.06 m (6 ft 9 in)	Al-Karamah	(Syria)
PF	14	Karim Ezzedine	26 – 8 August 1997	2.06 m (6 ft 9 in)	Dynamo Lebanon	(Lebanon)
PG	20	Wael Arakji	28 – 4 September 1994	1.93 m (6 ft 4 in)	Al Riyadi	(Lebanon)
PF	24	Hayk Gyokchyan	33 – 11 December 1989	2.03 m (6 ft 8 in)	Al Riyadi	(Lebanon)
PG	25	Ali Mezher	29 – 22 March 1994	1.82 m (6 ft 0 in)	Beirut Club	(Lebanon)

Head coach

- (Lebanon) Jad El Hajj

Assistant coach(es)

- (Serbia) Viktor Janketić

Legend

- (C) Team captain
- Club – describes last
  club before the tournament
- Age – describes age
  on 25 August 2023

== Statistics ==
=== Player representation by league system ===
League systems with 13 or more players represented are listed.

Country	Players
(United States) / USA/Canada ^{b}	69
(Europe) Euroleague Basketball ^{a}	63
Spain	44
/ France/Monaco	19
Japan	19
Italy	18
Germany	17
Greece	17
/ Australia/New Zealand	16
(Slovenia) / (Croatia) / (Bosnia and Herzegovina) / (Serbia) / (Montenegro) / (North Macedonia) ABA League	14
Others	151

^{a} As the Euroleague is a multinational league and all competing teams compete in their domestic leagues, the total percentage will be over 100 because of duplications.
^{b} Includes players from the NBA, NBA G League, Canadian Elite Basketball League, US NCAA, and US High School teams.

=== Player representation by club ===
Clubs with 5 or more players represented are listed.

Club	Players
(Lebanon) Al Riyadi	6
(Italy) Olimpia Milano	6
(Greece) Olympiacos	6
(Egypt) Al Ahly	5
(Germany) Alba Berlin	5
AS Monaco	5
(Spain) Barcelona	5
(Germany) Bayern Munich	5
(United States) Minnesota Timberwolves	5
(United States) Orlando Magic	5
(United States) Oklahoma City Thunder	5
(Greece) Panathinaikos	5
(United States) Utah Jazz	5
(Italy) Virtus Bologna	5
