= Shin Dong-pa =

South Korean basketball player

Personal information
- Born: September 2, 1944 (age 82) Anbe-gun, Korea, Empire of Japan (now South Hamgyong, North Korea)
- Listed height: 6 ft 2.75 in (1.90 m)
- Listed weight: 198 lb (90 kg)

Career information
- Playing career: 1962–1974
- Position: Shooting guard

Career history

Playing
- 1967–1974: Small Business Bank

Coaching
- 1976–1987: Pacific Chemical Women's Basketball Team
- 1978–1988: South Korea Women
- 1989–1991: Pacific Chemical Women's Basketball Team
- 1992–1994: SBS Basketball Team
Medals
Representing South Korea
Men's basketball
FIBA Asian Cup
Gold medal – first place	1969 Bangkok
Silver medal – second place	1967 Seoul
Silver medal – second place	1973 Manila
Bronze medal – third place	1963 Taipei
Bronze medal – third place	1965 Kuala Lumpur
Bronze medal – third place	1971 Tokyo
Asian Games
Gold medal – first place	1970 Bangkok
Bronze medal – third place	1966 Bangkok
Summer Universiade
Silver medal – second place	1967 Tokyo

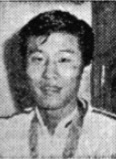

Shin Dong-pa (Korean: 신동파; born September 2, 1944) is a South Korean basketball coach, sports commentator, and former basketball player who competed at the men's basketball tournaments at the 1964 Summer Olympics and the 1968 Summer Olympics. He was also a member of the senior South Korean national team that won the gold medal at the 1969 FIBA Asian Cup. He also played with South Korea at the 1970 FIBA World Championship, where he finished as that tournament's top scorer.

Shin played primarily as a shooting guard, during his playing career. He is considered to be one of the best Asian basketball players of all time.

== Early life and education ==
Shin was born in Northern Korea, during Japanese rule, in what is now Anbyon County, in North Korea's South Hamgyong Province. He attended Whimoon High School and Yonsei University, where he graduated in 1967.

== Club playing career ==
Shin played club basketball in South Korea, with Small Business Bank, from 1967 to 1974.

== National team playing career ==
Shin is well known in the Philippines, because he scored 50 points for South Korea, in a game against the Philippine national basketball team, at the 1969 FIBA Asian Cup's final, which was held in Bangkok. Shin's South Korean team won that tournament. That team returned home to South Korea, to a hero's welcome, and even met the South Korean President at the time, Park Chung Hee.

Shin also competed with the senior men's South Korean national basketball team at the 1964 Summer Olympics and the 1968 Summer Olympics. He also played with South Korea at the 1970 FIBA World Championship, which was held in Yugoslavia. South Korea finished in 11th place out of 13 teams at that tournament. Shin ended up being the top scorer at the tournament, scoring an average of 32.6 points per game.

== Coaching and managing career ==
During the 1970s and 1980s, Shin worked as a women's basketball coach and team director. In 1991, Shin began to work as the founding director of the SBS Men's Basketball Team. He also worked as a men's basketball coach.

== Sports commentating career ==
Shin has also worked as a sports commentator for basketball games, for the Seoul Broadcasting System (SBS), and as a vice chairman of the South Korean Basketball Association.

== Career trajectory ==
- South Korean men's national basketball team player: (1962–1974)
- Small Business Bank Men's Basketball Team player: (1967–1974)
- Pacific Chemical Women's Director: (1975–1991)
- South Korean women's national team's Head coach: (1978–1988)
- SBS Men's Basketball Team Deputy Director, Director: (1991–1997)
- Seoul Broadcasting System (SBS) sports commentator: (1997–present)
- South Korean Basketball Association's executive director: (1999)
- South Korean Basketball Association's vice chairman: (2002)
