= Chen Tsu-li =

Taiwanese basketball player (born 1933)

Chen Tsu-li (陳祖烈)

Personal information
- Born: 28 May 1933 (age 93) Wuxing County, Zhejiang Province, China
- Number: 12
Medals
Men's basketball
Representing Taiwan
Asian Games
Silver medal – second place	1958 Tokyo
FIBA Asia Cup
Silver medal – second place	1960 Philippines

Chen Tsu-li (Chinese: 陳祖烈; pinyin: Chén Zǔliè), also known as James T. L. Chen, (born 28 May 1933) is a Taiwanese businessman, former basketball player and coach.

== National team playing career ==
Chen competed as a part of the Republic of China's senior national team at the 1956 Summer Olympics. He won silver medals at the 1958 Asian Games, and the 1960 FIBA Asian Championship. He also played at the 1959 FIBA World Championship, which he led in scoring average, at 20.1 points per game.

== Coaching career ==
After he ended his basketball playing career, Chen became a basketball coach. He was a head coach in both club teams in Taiwan, and of the senior Taiwanese national team, which he coached at the 1987 FIBA Asian Championship, which was held in Bangkok.
