= Amaury Pasos =

Brazilian basketball player and coach (1935–2024)

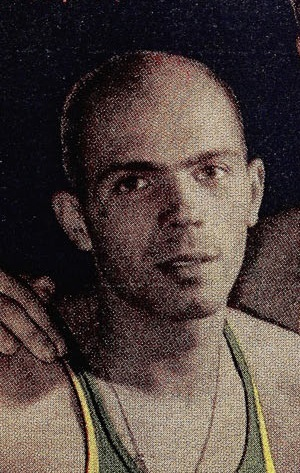
- Amaury Pasos, 1958

Personal information
- Born: December 11, 1935 São Paulo, Brazil
- Died: December 12, 2024 (aged 89) São Paulo, Brazil
- Listed height: 191 cm (6 ft 3 in)
- Listed weight: 91 kg (201 lb)

Career information
- Playing career: 1951–1972
- Positions: Power forward, center
- Coaching career: 1982–1995

Career history
- 1951–1957: Clube de Regatas Tietê
- 1958–1965: C.R. Sírio
- 1966–1972: Corinthians

Career highlights
- As a player: FIBA's 50 Greatest Players (1991); Brazil Former Athlete Olympic Prize (2003); FIBA World Cup MVP (1959); 2× South American Club Champion (1961, 1969); 2× Brazilian Champion (1966, 1969); 5× Paulista State Champion (1959, 1962, 1966, 1968, 1969)
- FIBA Hall of Fame
Medals
Men's basketball
Representing Brazil
Olympic Games
Bronze medal – third place	1960 Rome	Team
Bronze medal – third place	1964 Tokyo	Team
FIBA World Cup
Gold medal – first place	1959 Chile	Team
Gold medal – first place	1963 Brazil	Team
Silver medal – second place	1954 Brazil	Team
Bronze medal – third place	1967 Uruguay	Team
Pan American Games
Silver medal – second place	1963 São Paulo	Team
Bronze medal – third place	1955 Mexico City	Team
FIBA South American Championship
Gold medal – first place	1958 Chile	Team
Gold medal – first place	1960 Argentina	Team
Gold medal – first place	1961 Brazil	Team
Gold medal – first place	1963 Peru	Team

Amaury Antônio Pasos (December 11, 1935 – December 12, 2024), also commonly known simply as Amaury, was a Brazilian basketball player and coach of Argentine origin. Born in São Paulo, Brazil, he was a 1.91 m (6 ft 3 in) tall power forward. He competed at three Olympic Games and was named one of FIBA's 50 Greatest Players in 1991. He was awarded the Brazil Former Athlete Olympic Prize in 2003. He was enshrined into the FIBA Hall of Fame in 2007.

== Club career ==
At the club level, Pasos played for Clube de Regatas Tietê (1951–1961), and then C.R. Sírio (1962–1965) and Corinthians (1966–1972). He won the Brazilian League championship in 1966 and 1969, and the São Paulo regional title league in 1966, 1968 and 1969.

== National team career ==
Pasos played for the senior Brazilian national team. With Brazil, he won the gold medal at the 1959 FIBA World Championship (where he was also named the MVP of the tournament) and the gold medal at the 1963 FIBA World Championship. He also won a silver medal at the 1954 FIBA World Championship, bronze medals at the 1960 Summer Olympics and 1964 Summer Olympics, a bronze medal at the 1967 FIBA World Championship, a silver medal at the 1963 Pan American Games, and a bronze medal at the 1955 Pan American Games.

== Death ==
Pasos died in São Paulo on December 12, 2024, a day after his 89th birthday.
