= Japanese basketball league system =

The Japanese basketball league system, or Japanese basketball league pyramid is a series of interconnected competitions for professional basketball clubs in the country of Japan. The system has a hierarchical format with a promotion and demotion system between competitions at different levels.

== Men ==
=== The tier levels ===
Level	League(s)/Division(s)
I	B1 League 18 clubs ↓ 2 relegation spots + 1 relegation playoff spot
II	B2 League 18 clubs ↑ 2 promotion spots + 8 promotion playoffs spots ↓ 1 relegation spots
III	B3 League 12 clubs ↑ 1 promotion spots no relegation
IV	Japan Society Basketball Federation
V	Japan College Basketball Federation
VI	Japan Mini Basketball Federation

== Women ==
=== The tier levels ===
Level	League(s)/Division(s)
I	Women's Japan Basketball League 12 clubs no relegation
II	Japan Society Basketball Federation
III	Japan College Basketball Federation
IV	Japan Mini Basketball Federation

== Cup competitions ==
- B.League Early Cup
- Emperor's and Empress's Cup
- Japan Society Basketball Championship
- National Sports Festival of Japan

== See also ==
- League system
- European professional club basketball system
- Spanish basketball league system
- Greek basketball league system
- Italian basketball league system
- French basketball league system
- Russian basketball league system
- Turkish basketball league system
- German basketball league system
- Serbian basketball league system
- Polish basketball league system
- South American professional club basketball system
