= 1959 FIBA World Championship =

1959 edition of the FIBA World Championship

FIBA Campeonato Mundial de Baloncesto de 1959

Tournament details
- Host country: Chile
- Dates: 16–31 January
- Officially opened by: Jorge Alessandri
- Teams: 13
- Venues: 5 (in 5 host cities)

Final positions
- Champions: Brazil (1st title)
- Runners-up: United States
- Third place: Chile
- Fourth place: Formosa

Tournament statistics
- Games played: 48
- MVP: (Brazil) Amaury Pasos
- Top scorer: (Taiwan) James T. L. Chen (20.1 points per game)

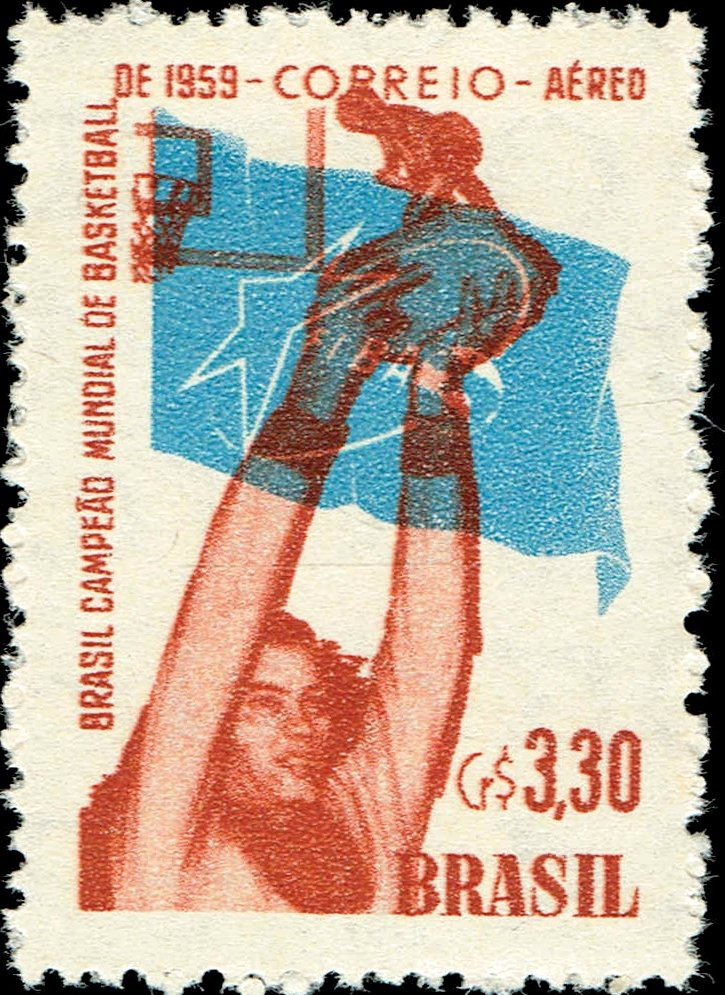
Brazilian stamp marking the team's victory

The 1959 FIBA World Championship was the 3rd FIBA World Championship—the international basketball world championship for men's national teams. It was hosted by Chile from 16 to 31 January 1959. Amaury Antônio Pasos was named the MVP.

The hosting cities for the competition were Antofagasta, Concepción, Temuco, Valparaíso, with the final stages held at the capital of Santiago.

The final games were supposed to be conducted at the newly constructed Metropolitan Indoor Stadium, but because the venue was not finished in time, competition was postponed by a year from the original date. Organizers moved outdoors to the Estadio Nacional de Chile, where the events were watched at by a crowd of at least 16,000.

== Competing nations ==
Group A	Group B	Group C
Argentina; United Arab Rep. Formosa; United States	Brazil; Canada; Mexico; Soviet Union	Bulgaria; Philippines; Puerto Rico; Uruguay
Chile – advanced automatically to the final round as host

== Competition format ==
- Preliminary round: Three groups of four teams play each other once; top two teams progress to the final round, bottom two teams relegated to classification round.
- Classification round:
  - First round: Two groups of three teams (A1, B2, C1 and A2, B1, C2) play each other once.
  - Second round: Top teams from each group play for eighth, second placers play for tenth, and last placers play for twelfth.
- Final round: All top two from preliminary round group play each other once. The team with the best record wins the championship.

== Preliminary round ==
=== Group A ===
Pos	Team	Pld	W	L	PF	PA	PD	Pts	Qualification
1	United States	3	3	0	271	204	+67	6	Final round
2	Formosa	3	2	1	207	209	−2	5	Final round
3	Argentina	3	1	2	197	202	−5	4	Classification round
4	United Arab Republic	3	0	3	179	239	−60	3	Classification round

Source: FIBA archive
Rules for classification: 1) points; 2) head-to-head points; 3) head-to-head goal average; 4) head-to-head number of points scored.

16 January

United States	87–73	Argentina
Scoring by half: 48-27, 39-46

Concepción, Chile

16 January

Formosa	71–69	United Arab Rep.
Scoring by half: 39-38, 32-31

Concepción, Chile

17 January

Argentina	65–52	United Arab Rep.
Scoring by half: 36-32, 29-20

Concepción, Chile

17 January

United States	81–73	Formosa
Scoring by half: 35-38, 46-35

Concepción, Chile

18 January

Argentina	59–63	Formosa
Scoring by half: 33-31, 26-32

Concepción, Chile

18 January

United Arab Rep.	58–103	United States
Scoring by half: 49-23, 54-35

Concepción, Chile

=== Group B ===
Pos	Team	Pld	W	L	PF	PA	PD	Pts	Qualification
1	Brazil	3	2	1	211	175	+36	5 (Note: Head-to-head record: Brazil 1–1 (1.06 GAvg), Soviet Union 1–1 (1.00 GAvg), Canada 1–1 (0.94 GAvg))	Final round
2	Soviet Union	3	2	1	229	199	+30	5	Final round
3	Canada	3	2	1	169	174	−5	5	Classification round
4	Mexico	3	0	3	173	234	−61	3	Classification round

Source: FIBA archive
Rules for classification: 1) points; 2) head-to-head points; 3) head-to-head goal average; 4) head-to-head number of points scored.
Notes:

16 January

Canada	52–69	Brazil
Scoring by half: 24-30, 28-39

Temuco, Chile

16 January

Soviet Union	102–72	Mexico
Scoring by half: 48-42, 54-30

Temuco, Chile

17 January

Canada	54–51	Mexico
Scoring by half: 26-19, 28-32

Temuco, Chile

17 January

Soviet Union	73–64	Brazil
Scoring by half: 39-36, 34-28

Temuco, Chile

18 January

Canada	63–54	Soviet Union
Scoring by half: 32-23, 31-31

Temuco, Chile

18 January

Mexico	50–78	Brazil
Scoring by half: 20-50, 30-28

Temuco, Chile

=== Group C ===
Pos	Team	Pld	W	L	PF	PA	PD	Pts	Qualification
1	Bulgaria	3	3	0	217	174	+43	6	Final round
2	Puerto Rico	3	2	1	209	194	+15	5	Final round
3	Philippines	3	1	2	192	220	−28	4	Classification round
4	Uruguay	3	0	3	181	211	−30	3	Classification round

Source: FIBA archive
Rules for classification: 1) points; 2) head-to-head points; 3) head-to-head goal average; 4) head-to-head number of points scored.

16 January

Philippines	68–59	Uruguay
Scoring by half: 36-31, 32-28

Antofagasta, Chile

16 January

Bulgaria	67–55	Puerto Rico
Scoring by half: 37-16, 30-39

Antofagasta, Chile

17 January

Uruguay	64–78	Puerto Rico
Scoring by half: 37-40, 27-38

Antofagasta, Chile

17 January

Bulgaria	85–61	Philippines
Scoring by half: 36-21, 49-40

Antofagasta, Chile

18 January

Puerto Rico	76–63	Philippines
Scoring by half: 39-32, 37-31

Antofagasta, Chile

18 January

Bulgaria	65–58	Uruguay
Scoring by half: 31-28, 34-30

Antofagasta, Chile

== Classification round ==
=== First round ===
==== Group D ====
Pos	Team	Pld	W	L	PF	PA	PD	Pts	Qualification
1	Philippines	2	2	0	145	130	+15	4	Eighth place playoff
2	United Arab Republic	2	1	1	136	135	+1	3	Tenth place playoff
3	Canada	2	0	2	134	150	−16	2	Twelfth place playoff

Source: FIBA archive
Rules for classification: 1) points; 2) head-to-head points; 3) head-to-head goal average; 4) head-to-head number of points scored.

21 January

Philippines	66–65	United Arab Rep.
Scoring by half: 25-29, 41-36

Valparaíso, Chile

22 January

Canada	69–71	United Arab Rep.
Scoring by half: 40-28, 29-43

Valparaíso, Chile

23 January

Canada	65–79	Philippines
Scoring by half: 33-31, 32-48

Valparaíso, Chile

==== Group E ====
Pos	Team	Pld	W	L	PF	PA	PD	Pts	Qualification
1	Uruguay	2	2	0	105	95	+10	4	Eighth place playoff
2	Argentina	2	1	1	123	117	+6	3	Tenth place playoff
3	Mexico	2	0	2	113	129	−16	2	Twelfth place playoff

Source: FIBA archive
Rules for classification: 1) points; 2) head-to-head points; 3) head-to-head goal average; 4) head-to-head number of points scored.

21 January

Argentina	48–51	Uruguay
Scoring by half: 19-22, 29-29

Valparaíso, Chile

22 January

Mexico	47–54	Uruguay
Scoring by half: 20-25, 27-29

Valparaíso, Chile

23 January

Argentina	75–66	Mexico
Scoring by half: 34-34, 41-32

Valparaíso, Chile

=== Second round ===
==== Twelfth place playoff ====
25 January

Canada	64–56	Mexico
Scoring by half: 33-25, 31-31

Valparaíso, Chile

==== Tenth place playoff ====
25 January

United Arab Rep.	59–61	Argentina
Scoring by half: 29-32, 30-29

Valparaíso, Chile

==== Eighth place playoff ====
25 January

Philippines	78–70	Uruguay
Scoring by half: 47-36, 31-34

Valparaíso, Chile

== Final round ==
Pos	Team	Pld	W	L	PF	PA	PD	Pts
1	Brazil (C)	6	5	1	472	382	+90	11
2	United States	6	4	2	370	378	−8	10
3	Chile (H)	6	2	4	393	444	−51	8 (Note: Head-to-head record: Chile 1–0 Formosa)
4	Formosa	6	2	4	315	350	−35	8
5	Puerto Rico	6	1	5	397	471	−74	7
6	Soviet Union (Note: FIBA demoted the Soviet Union and Bulgaria to the bottom two places after they refused to play against Formosa, forfeiting the game, due to political reasons.)	6	5	1	365	264	+101	10
7	Bulgaria	6	2	4	315	338	−23	7

Source: FIBA archive
Rules for classification: 1) points; 2) head-to-head points; 3) head-to-head goal average; 4) head-to-head number of points scored.
(C) Champions; (H) Hosts
Notes:

20 January

Chile	86–85 (OT)	Formosa
Scoring by half: 35-27, 36-44 Overtime: 15-14

Santiago

21 January

Puerto Rico	55–84	Soviet Union
Scoring by half: 29-26, 26-58

Santiago

21 January

Bulgaria	58–63	United States
Scoring by half: 27-26, 31-37

Santiago

22 January

Brazil	94–76	Formosa
Scoring by half: 56-35, 38-41

Santiago

22 January

Chile	83–71	Puerto Rico
Scoring by half: 46-31, 37-40

Santiago

23 January

Brazil	62–53	Bulgaria
Scoring by half: 30-28, 32-25

Santiago

23 January

United States	54–53	Puerto Rico
Scoring by half: 25-32, 29-21

Santiago

24 January

Brazil	63–66	Soviet Union
Scoring by half: 31-30, 32-36

Santiago

24 January

Bulgaria	76–71	Chile
Scoring by half: 37-33, 39-38

Santiago

26 January

Formosa	69–85	United States
Scoring by half: 32-33, 37-52

Santiago

26 January

Bulgaria	58–78	Soviet Union
Scoring by half: 18-35, 40-43

Santiago

27 January

Formosa	81–85	Puerto Rico
Scoring by half: 34-42, 47-43

Santiago

27 January

Chile	49–75	Soviet Union
Scoring by half: 28-35, 21-40

Santiago

28 January

Brazil	99–71	Puerto Rico
Scoring by half: 45-29, 54-42

Santiago

28 January

United States	37–62	Soviet Union
Scoring by half: 14-25, 23-37

Santiago

29 January

Bulgaria	70–62	Puerto Rico
Scoring by half: 35-25, 35-37

Santiago

29 January

Chile	55–64	United States

Santiago

30 January

Formosa	2–0	Soviet Union

Santiago

30 January

Brazil	81–67	United States
Scoring by half: 40-37, 41-30

Santiago

31 January

Bulgaria	0–2	Formosa

Santiago

31 January

Brazil	73–49	Chile
Scoring by half: 37-21, 36-28

Santiago

== Awards ==
1959 World Championship winner

Brazil
First title

Most Valuable Player
(Brazil) Amaury Pasos

== Final standings ==
Rank	Team	Record
1	Brazil	7–2
2	United States	7–2
3	Chile	2–4
4	Formosa	4–5
5	Puerto Rico	3–6
6	Soviet Union	7–2
7	Bulgaria	5–4
8	Philippines	4–2
9	Uruguay	2–4
10	Argentina	3–3
11	United Arab Republic	1–5
12	Canada	3–3
13	Mexico	0–6

== Top scorers (points per game) ==
1. James T. L. Chen (Formosa) 20.1
2. Juan "Pachin" Vicens (Puerto Rico) 19.7
3. Wlamir Marques (Brazil) 18.6
4. Jerry Vayda (USA) 18
5. Lio Jin Ron (Formosa) 16.7
6. Dick Welsh (USA) 16.4
7. Viktor Radev (Bulgaria) 15.25
8. Amaury Pasos (Brazil) 15.22
9. Jose Angel Cestero (Puerto Rico) 14.3
10. Evelio Droz (Puerto Rico) 13.7

== All-Tournament team ==
- (Puerto Rico) Juan Vicéns
- (Brazil) Amaury Pasos (MVP)
- (Brazil) Wlamir Marques
- (Bulgaria) Atanas Atanasov
- (Soviet Union) Jānis Krūmiņš
