= Jerry Vayda =

American basketball player

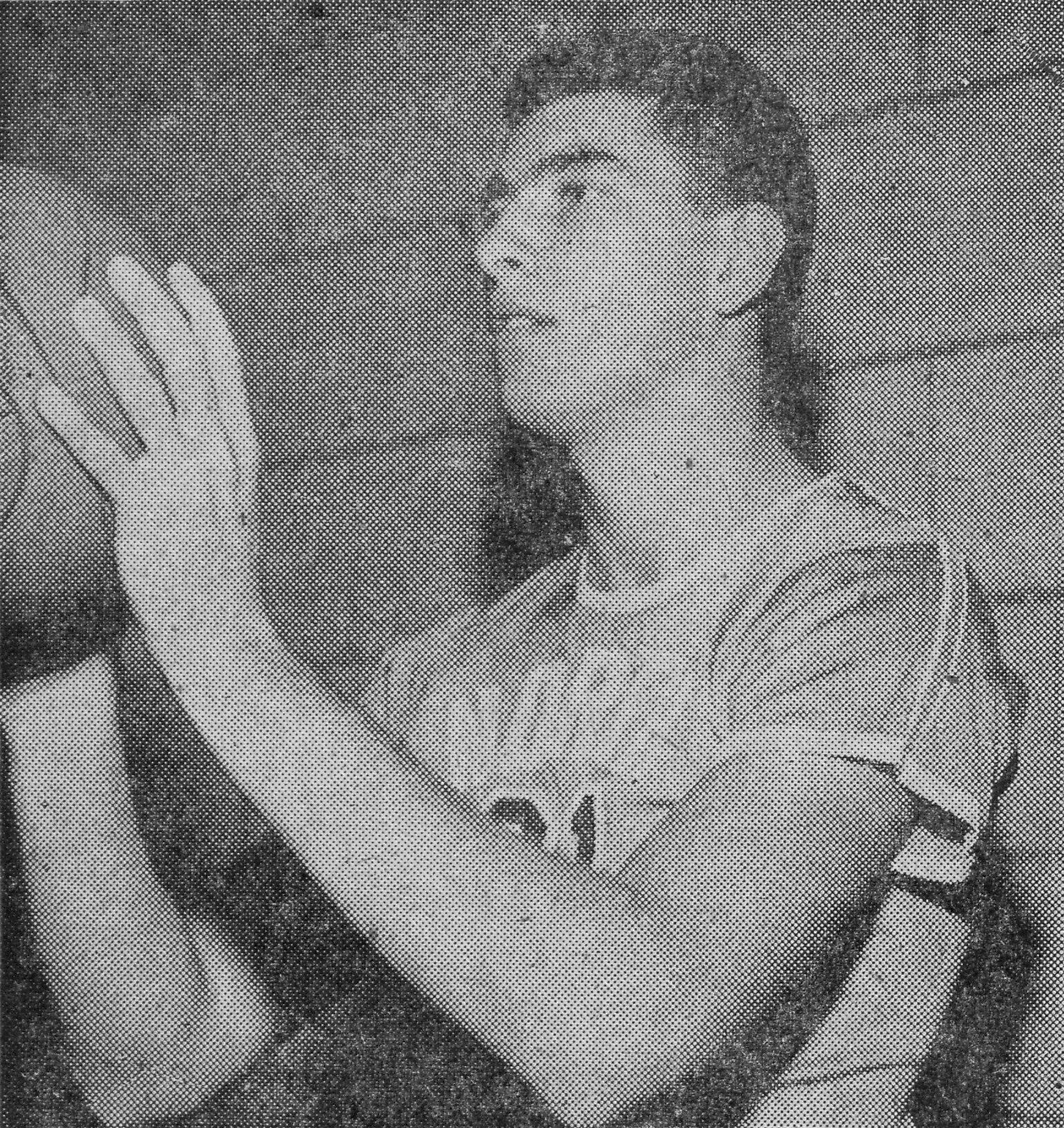
- Vayda with North Carolina, c. 1953

Personal information
- Born: July 18, 1934 Bayonne, New Jersey, US
- Died: February 16, 1978 (aged 43) New Orleans, Louisiana, US
- Listed height: 6 ft 4 in (1.93 m)
- Listed weight: 200 lb (91 kg)

Career information
- High school: St. Peter's Prep (Jersey City, New Jersey)
- College: North Carolina (1952–1956)
- NBA draft: 1956: undrafted
- Position: Small forward

Career highlights
- Second-team All-ACC (1954)
Medals
Men's basketball
Representing United States
FIBA World Cup
Silver medal – second place	1959 Chile

Jerome Joseph Vayda (July 18, 1934 – February 16, 1978) was an American basketball player. At a height of 6 ft 4 in (1.93 m) tall, he played at the small forward position.

== College career ==
Vayda attended the University of North Carolina at Chapel Hill, where he played college basketball with the Tar Heels. He was named to the ACC's All Second Team, in 1954.

== National team career ==
As a member of the U.S. Air Force, Vayda represented the senior men's USA national basketball team, at the 1959 FIBA World Championship. He scored a total of 162 points during the tournament, for a scoring average of 18.0 points per game. With the US, he won the tournament's silver medal.

== Personal life ==
Vayda was born in Bayonne, New Jersey, on July 18, 1934, to his parents Joseph G. Vayda and Anna C. Vayda. He died on February 16, 1978, at the age of 43, due to a heart attack. He is survived by two children Catherine J. Vayda, and William J. Vayda.
