= Bulgaria men's national basketball team =

Men's national basketball team representing Bulgaria

Bulgaria
- FIBA ranking: 58 ▼3 (1 September 2026)
- Joined FIBA: 1935
- FIBA zone: FIBA Europe
- National federation: Bulgarian Basketball Federation
- Coach: Lyubomir Minchev
- Nickname(s): Лъвовете / Lăvovete (The Lions)

Olympic Games
- Appearances: 4
- Medals: None

FIBA World Cup
- Appearances: 1
- Medals: None

EuroBasket
- Appearances: 25
- Medals: (silver) Silver: (1957); (bronze) Bronze: (1961)
Home	Away

First international
- Italy 42–23 Bulgaria (Geneva, Switzerland; 2 May 1935)

Biggest win
- Ireland 55–133 Bulgaria (Heerlen, Netherlands; 4 May 1972)

Biggest defeat
- Bulgaria 60–104 Russia (Botevgrad, Bulgaria; 21 February 2019)

The Bulgaria men's national basketball team (Bulgarian: Български национален отбор по баскетбол, romanized: Bălgarski natsionalen otbor po basketbol) represents Bulgaria in international basketball. The governing body is the Bulgarian Basketball Federation.

Bulgaria's first appearance at an international tournament came at the EuroBasket in 1935. They have reached the premier European basketball competition 25 times, with their best results coming in 1957 as the runners-up on home soil, and their bronze medal finish in 1961 respectively. Bulgaria has also qualified for the FIBA World Cup, where they finished seventh in their lone appearance in 1959. Competing at the Olympic Games multiple times, the national team had their top performance in 1956. Bulgaria has also competed at smaller events, such as the Balkan Championship, winning gold medals in 1959, 1960, and 1971.

== History ==
=== EuroBasket 1935 ===
Bulgaria debuted on the international stage at the first EuroBasket (European Basketball Championship), which was held in Geneva, in 1935. The Bulgarian side started the tournament off with a loss to Italy in the preliminary round, but bounced back to defeat Hungary in their next match. Following this, Bulgaria lost their classification matches to Belgium, and to Italy again. The national team would finishing off their tournament debut in 8th place.

=== EuroBasket 1947 ===
Twelve years later, the Bulgarian national team reached the tournament once again, for their second appearance overall. At the EuroBasket 1947, Bulgaria split their two preliminary round matches against Austria, and France advancing to the upper bracket semifinal groups. There they lost all three of their games, putting them in a 7th/8th place classification match versus Hungary, which they lost. The national team would once again end the tournament reaching the quarterfinals.

=== EuroBasket 1951 ===
Bulgaria's third appearance was at EuroBasket 1951 in Paris. They won their two contested preliminary games, outscoring opponents 145–70, and gained a third win by Romania's forfeit. In the semifinal round, the national team became enmeshed in a three-way tie for first place in the four-team group after losing to France but winning the other two matches, and ended up finishing in second place in the group. This pitted them against the Soviet Union in a semifinal matchup, which the Bulgarians lost. The national team then went on to lose again, in the bronze medal game to France.

=== EuroBasket 1953 ===
The national team's next appearance was in Moscow for EuroBasket 1953. They found themselves on the unfortunate end of a three-way tiebreaker after finishing 3–1 in their preliminary group, and their 3rd place rank in the group sent them to the classification round, a disappointing turn of events for Bulgaria which had expected to do at least as well as they had two years prior. They won their next five matches to take the highest place available, after the preliminary round. Thus, reaching the quarterfinals in the tournament with an 8–1 record.

=== EuroBasket 1955 ===
At EuroBasket 1955 in Budapest, the Bulgarian side open up their campaign at the tournament with a 107-33 dismantling of Denmark. They would go on to only drop one match in their preliminary group to finish with a 2–1 record, which allowed them to advance to the final round along with group leader Czechoslovakia. After losing to the three eventual medalists in the final round, Bulgaria finished the round with a 4–3 record while once again reaching the semifinals.

=== EuroBasket 1957 ===
Bulgaria hosted the EuroBasket 1957, in Sofia. The national team breezed through their three preliminary round matches, and kept their win streak through the first six of the final round games, including an 82–80 victory over Czechoslovakia. In their final game of the tournament, which by chance was against the similarly undefeated Soviet Union squad, Bulgaria led by 4 points at halftime, 23–19. Their lead did not last through the second half though, however, as the Soviets powered to a 60–57 final, Bulgaria finished as the runners-up with the silver medal.

=== 1959 World Cup ===
Bulgaria made its debut at the World Cup in 1959. They were placed in Group C, where they went undefeated (3-0) and advanced to the final round. There, they finished with a 2–4 record, but after controversy struck. As they along with the Soviets refused to play Formosa, due to political reasons. This mishap caused the national team to be relegated to seventh place at the tournament.

=== EuroBasket 1961 ===
At the EuroBasket 1961, the national team returned to the top European basketball tournament looking to place better than their last trip at the event. In their preliminary round group they finished with a 2–0 record to move on to the second round. There they finished with an impressive 4–1 record to advance to the semifinals with a matchup against the Soviet Union. The outcome did not turn out in the favour of the Bulgarian side though, as they were manhandled 77–54. The devastating loss sent the Bulgarians to the bronze medal match versus France, where they came away with a victory to end the tournament on a high note.

=== Later years ===
Bulgaria would go on to qualify to the European Basketball Championship 16 more times after 1961, but never came away with a top three finish at the event. The Bulgarian side have endured multiple droughts without qualifying as well, e.g. not reaching the tournament for 12 years after EuroBasket 1993 until EuroBasket 2005. As well as not having qualified to the tournament since 2011. They have also attempted to qualify for the World Cup on numerous occasions since 1959, although they have yet to succeed in their bid.

== Competitive record ==
=== FIBA World Cup ===
World Cup					Qualification		
Year	Position	Pld	W	L	Pld	W	L
(Argentina) 1950	Did not enter				Did not enter		
(Brazil) 1954	Did not qualify				EuroBasket served as qualifiers		
(Chile) 1959	7th	9	5	4	EuroBasket served as qualifiers		
(Brazil) 1963	Did not qualify				EuroBasket served as qualifiers		
(Uruguay) 1967	Did not qualify				EuroBasket served as qualifiers		
(Socialist Federal Republic of Yugoslavia) 1970	Did not qualify				EuroBasket served as qualifiers		
(Puerto Rico) 1974	Did not qualify				EuroBasket served as qualifiers		
(Philippines) 1978	Did not qualify				EuroBasket served as qualifiers		
(Colombia) 1982	Did not qualify				EuroBasket served as qualifiers		
(Spain) 1986	Did not qualify				6	2	4
(Argentina) 1990	Did not qualify				EuroBasket served as qualifiers		
(Canada) 1994	Did not qualify				EuroBasket served as qualifiers		
(Greece) 1998	Did not qualify				EuroBasket served as qualifiers		
(United States) 2002	Did not qualify				EuroBasket served as qualifiers		
(Japan) 2006	Did not qualify				EuroBasket served as qualifiers		
(Turkey) 2010	Did not qualify				EuroBasket served as qualifiers		
(Spain) 2014	Did not qualify				EuroBasket served as qualifiers		
(China) 2019	Did not qualify				16	8	8
(Philippines) (Japan) (Indonesia) 2023	Did not qualify				6	1	5
(Qatar) 2027	Did not qualify				4	1	3
(France) 2031	To be determined				To be determined		
Total	1/20	9	5	4	32	12	20

=== Olympic Games ===
Olympic Games					Qualifying		
Year	Position	Pld	W	L	Pld	W	L
(Nazi Germany) 1936	Did not enter						
(United Kingdom) 1948	Did not enter						
(Finland) 1952	7th	10	5	5			
(Australia) 1956	5th	8	5	3			
(Italy) 1960	16th	6	1	5	Direct qualification		
(Japan) 1964	Did not qualify				8	5	3
(Mexico) 1968	10th	9	4	5	8	7	1
(West Germany) 1972	Did not qualify				12	7	5
(Canada) 1976	Did not qualify				6	3	3
(Soviet Union) 1980	Did not qualify				3	0	3
(United States) 1984	Did not qualify				3	1	2
(South Korea) 1988	Did not enter				Did not enter		
(Spain) 1992	Did not qualify				5	2	3
(United States) 1996	Did not qualify				Did not qualify		
(Australia) 2000	Did not qualify				Did not qualify		
(Greece) 2004	Did not qualify				Did not qualify		
(China) 2008	Did not qualify				Did not qualify		
(United Kingdom) 2012	Did not qualify				Did not qualify		
(Brazil) 2016	Did not qualify				Did not qualify		
(Japan) 2020	Did not qualify				Did not qualify		
(France) 2024	Did not qualify				3	0	3
(United States) 2028	To be determined				To be determined		
Total	4/21	33	15	18	48	25	23

=== EuroBasket ===
EuroBasket					Qualification		
Year	Position	Pld	W	L	Pld	W	L
(Switzerland) 1935	8th	4	1	3			
(Latvia) 1937	Did not enter						
(Lithuania) 1939	Did not enter						
(Switzerland) 1946	Did not enter						
(Czechoslovakia) 1947	8th	6	1	5			
(Egypt) 1949	Did not enter						
(France) 1951	4th	8	5	3			
(Soviet Union) 1953	9th	9	8	1			
(Hungary) 1955	4th	10	6	4			
(Bulgaria) 1957	2nd place, silver medalist(s)	10	9	1			
(Turkey) 1959	5th	8	5	3			
(Socialist Federal Republic of Yugoslavia) 1961	3rd place, bronze medalist(s)	8	6	2			
(Poland) 1963	5th	9	7	2	Direct qualification		
(Soviet Union) 1965	5th	9	6	3	Direct qualification		
(Finland) 1967	4th	9	4	5	Direct qualification		
(Italy) 1969	7th	7	4	3	4	3	1
(West Germany) 1971	6th	7	4	3	4	4	0
(Spain) 1973	6th	7	3	4	Direct qualification		
(Socialist Federal Republic of Yugoslavia) 1975	5th	7	3	4	Direct qualification		
(Belgium) 1977	6th	7	4	3	Direct qualification		
(Italy) 1979	11th	7	1	6	Direct qualification		
(Czechoslovakia) 1981	Did not qualify				5	1	4
(France) 1983	Did not qualify				9	5	4
(West Germany) 1985	8th	8	3	5	14	10	4
(Greece) 1987	Did not qualify				9	5	4
(Socialist Federal Republic of Yugoslavia) 1989	7th	5	1	4	9	7	2
(Italy) 1991	8th	5	0	5	6	4	2
(Germany) 1993	16th	3	0	3	6	4	2
(Greece) 1995	Did not qualify				10	4	6
(Spain) 1997	Did not qualify				10	5	5
(France) 1999	Did not qualify				10	3	7
(Turkey) 2001	Did not qualify				10	4	6
(Sweden) 2003	Did not qualify				16	9	7
(Serbia and Montenegro) 2005	13th	3	0	3	6	4	2
(Spain) 2007	Did not qualify				10	4	6
(Poland) 2009	13th	3	0	3	8	4	4
(Lithuania) 2011	13th	5	2	3	8	4	4
(Slovenia) 2013	Did not qualify				8	4	4
(France) (Croatia) (Germany) (Latvia) 2015	Did not qualify				14	7	7
(Finland) (Israel) (Romania) (Turkey) 2017	Did not qualify				6	2	4
(Czech Republic) (Georgia (country)) (Italy) (Germany) 2022	20th	5	1	4	6	2	4
(Cyprus) (Finland) (Poland) (Latvia) 2025	Did not qualify				16	11	5
(Estonia) (Greece) (Slovenia) (Spain) 2029	To be determined				To be determined		
Total	25/42	169	84	85	204	110	94

== Results and fixtures ==
Win Loss

=== 2025 ===
27 November 2025 EuroBasket 2029 pre-qualifiers – 1st round	Bulgaria	98–88	Armenia	Botevgrad, Bulgaria
19:15 (UTC+2)	Scoring by quarter: 25–21, 26–20, 27–26, 20–21
	Pts: Stoimenov 21; Rebs: Minchev 11; Asts: Bost 9	Boxscore	Pts: Spight 37; Rebs: Melikyan 12; Asts: Vital 3	Arena: Arena Botevgrad; Attendance: 1,900; Referees: Branimir Galić (CRO), Tomasz Łangowski (POL), Luka Manojlović (SRB)

=== 2026 ===
27 February 2026 EuroBasket 2029 pre-qualifiers – 1st round	Norway	76–67	Bulgaria	Hønefoss, Norway
20:00 (UTC+1)	Scoring by quarter: 29–16, 17–17, 16–14, 14–20
	Pts: Ndow 27; Rebs: Ndow 8 Asts: Espe, Frey 7	Boxscore	Pts: Dimitrov 12; Rebs: Minchev 13; Asts: P. Ivanov, Stoimenov 3	Arena: Hønefoss Arena; Attendance: 1,500; Referees: Łukasz Jankowski (POL), Armin Mutapčić (GER), Jānis Rozenbergs (LAT)

2 March 2026 EuroBasket 2029 pre-qualifiers – 1st round	Armenia	80–100	Bulgaria	Yerevan, Armenia
20:15 (UTC+4)	Scoring by quarter: 17–22, 18–17, 21–21, 24–40
	Pts: McGhee 35; Rebs: Melikyan, Tatevosyan 8 Asts: McGhee 7	Boxscore	Pts: P. Ivanov 24; Rebs: Minchev 9 Asts: Toshkov 12	Arena: Mika Sports Arena; Attendance: 1,300; Referees: Ciprian Stoica (ROU), Nemanja Vlahović (SRB), Gabrielius Simonavičius (LTU)

5 July 2026 EuroBasket 2029 pre-qualifiers – 1st round	Bulgaria	88–57	Norway	Botevgrad, Bulgaria
19:30 (UTC+3)	Scoring by quarter: 27–10, 25–17, 22–12, 14–18
	Pts: Vezenkov 22; Rebs: A. Ivanov 8 Asts: Toshkov 8	Boxscore	Pts: Bergseng 10; Rebs: Savić 8 Asts: Espe 4	Arena: Arena Botevgrad; Attendance: 3,500; Referees: Zoran Mitrovski (MKD), Jan Baloun (CZE), Oleksandr Oparin (UKR)

30 August 2026 EuroBasket 2029 pre-qualifiers – 2nd round	Romania	86–103	Bulgaria	Tulcea, Romania
18:00 (UTC+3)	Scoring by quarter: 32–34, 16–23, 18–20, 20–26
	Pts: Russell 22; Rebs: Cățe 8 Asts: Russell 6	Boxscore	Pts: Vezenkov 36; Rebs: Mladenov 11; Asts: Gibson 9	Arena: Danubius Arena; Attendance: 4,603; Referees: Zafer Yılmaz (TUR), Ilias Kounelles (CYP), Rainis Värv (EST)

26 November 2026 EuroBasket 2029 pre-qualifiers – 2nd round	Bulgaria	vs.	Denmark	Sofia, Bulgaria
19:00 (UTC+2)
		Boxscore		Arena: Arena Sofia

=== 2027 ===
25 February 2027 EuroBasket 2029 pre-qualifiers – 2nd round	Bulgaria	vs.	Romania	Bulgaria
--:-- (UTC+2)
		Boxscore

28 February 2027 EuroBasket 2029 pre-qualifiers – 2nd round	Denmark	vs.	Bulgaria	Denmark
--:-- (UTC+1)
		Boxscore

== Team ==
=== Current roster ===
Roster for the EuroBasket 2029 Pre-Qualifiers match on 30 August 2026 against Romania.

Bulgaria men's national basketball team roster
Players
Coaches

Pos.	No.	Name	Age – Date of birth	Height	Club	Ctr.
PG	1	Aleksandar Gavalyugov	20 – 22 January 2006	1.91 m (6 ft 3 in)	Santa Clara	(United States)
SG	3	Aleksandar Stoimenov	24 – 26 October 2001	1.98 m (6 ft 6 in)	Balkan Botevgrad	(Bulgaria)
PG	7	Umoja Gibson	28 – 4 July 1998	1.85 m (6 ft 1 in)	Barcelona	(Spain)
SG	10	Pavlin Ivanov (C)	33 – 28 March 1993	1.95 m (6 ft 5 in)	Balkan Botevgrad	(Bulgaria)
F/C	11	Yordan Minchev	27 – 17 October 1998	2.06 m (6 ft 9 in)	Manresa	(Spain)
G/F	12	Borislav Mladenov	26 – 15 August 2000	2.02 m (6 ft 8 in)	Hapoel Tel Aviv	(Israel)
C	15	Tsvetomir Chernokozhev	26 – 1 June 2000	2.08 m (6 ft 10 in)	Cherno More	(Bulgaria)
C	17	Emil Stoilov	24 – 7 February 2002	2.10 m (6 ft 11 in)	Menorca	(Spain)
PG	22	Konstantin Toshkov	24 – 14 February 2002	1.86 m (6 ft 1 in)	Balkan Botevgrad	(Bulgaria)
SF	23	Miroslav Vasov	27 – 12 November 1998	1.99 m (6 ft 6 in)	Rilski Sportist	(Bulgaria)
F	35	Ivan Alipiev	27 – 28 July 1999	2.00 m (6 ft 7 in)	Balkan Botevgrad	(Bulgaria)
PF	41	Sasha Vezenkov	31 – 6 August 1995	2.06 m (6 ft 9 in)	Olympiacos	(Greece)

Head coach

- (Bulgaria) Lyubomir Minchev

Assistant coach(es)

- (Bulgaria) Toni Dechev
- (Bulgaria) Yavor Asparuhov

Legend

- (C) Team captain
- Club – describes last
  club before the competition
- Age – describes age
  on 30 August 2026

=== Depth chart ===
Pos.	Starting 5	Bench 1	Bench 2
C	Yordan Minchev	Emil Stoilov
PF	Sasha Vezenkov	Tsvetomir Chernokozhev
SF	Borislav Mladenov	Ivan Alipiev
SG	Pavlin Ivanov	Miroslav Vasov	Aleksandar Stoimenov
PG	Umoja Gibson	Aleksandar Gavalyugov	Konstantin Toshkov

== Head coach position ==
- (Bulgaria) Rosen Barchovski – (2004–2007)
- (Israel) Pini Gershon – (2008–2010)
- (Bulgaria) Rosen Barchovski – (2010–2012)
- (Bulgaria) Konstantin Papazov – (2013)
- (Bulgaria) Georgi Mladenov – (2014)
- (Bulgaria) Lyubomir Minchev – (2015–2019)
- (Bulgaria) Rosen Barchovski – (2019–2025)
- (Bulgaria) Lyubomir Minchev – (2025–present)

== Notable players ==
- Atanas Golomeev – Most decorated Bulgarian basketball player of all-time. As he was named one of FIBA's 50 Greatest Players.
- Georgi Glouchkov – First player from an Eastern bloc country to compete in the American National Basketball Association (NBA)

== Past rosters ==
1935 EuroBasket: finished 8th among 10 teams

3 Krum Konstantinov, 4 Pinkas, 5 Etropolski, 6 Rogachev, 7 Tsankov, 8 Kevorkyan, 9 Haymov (Coach: Krum Konstantinov)

1947 EuroBasket: finished 8th among 14 teams

3 Veselin Temkov, 4 Hristo Haytov, 5 Lyudmil Katerinski, 6 Aleksandar Damyanov, 7 Sharkov, 8 Kosanov, 9 Peev, 10 Konstantin Georgiev, 11 Nikola Kolev, 12 Raykov, 13 Bozhidar Takev, 14 Iliya Asenov, 15 Stefan Bankov (Coach: Georgi Petkov)

1951 EuroBasket: finished 4th among 17 teams

3 Iliya Georgiev, 4 Stefan Bankov, 5 Neycho Neychev, 6 Vladimir Savov, 7 Iliya Asenov, 8 Petar Shishkov, 9 Kiril Semov, 10 Konstantin Totev, 11 Anton Kuzov, 12 Gencho Hristov, 13 Ivan Nikolov, 14 Dimitar Popov, 15 Metodi Tomovski, 16 Konstantin Georgiev (Coach: Veselin Temkov)

1952 Olympic Games: finished 7th among 23 teams

3 Iliya Georgiev, 4 Kiril Semov, 5 Neycho Neychev, 6 Hristo Donchev, 7 Vasil Manchenko, 8 Petar Shishkov, 9 Georgi Panov, 10 Konstantin Totev, 11 Anton Kuzov, 12 Gencho Hristov, 13 Ivan Nikolov, 14 Veselin Penkov, 15 Konstantin Georgiev, 16 Vladimir Savov (Coach: Veselin Temkov)

1953 EuroBasket: finished 9th among 17 teams

3 Iliya Georgiev, 4 Vladimir Stefanov, 5 Velko Velkov, 6 Hristo Donchev, 7 Vasil Manchenko, 8 Konstantin Georgiev, 9 Georgi Panov, 10 Konstantin Totev, 11 Anton Kuzov, 12 Dimitar Popov, 13 Lyubomir Panov, 14 Veselin Penkov, 15 Iliya Mirchev, 16 Vladimir Savov (Coach: Veselin Temkov)

1955 EuroBasket: finished 4th among 18 teams

3 Vasil Manchenko, 4 Vladimir Ganchev, 5 Iliya Mirchev, 6 Rajkov, 7 Gencho Hristov, 8 Anton Kuzov, 9 Georgi Panov, 10 Konstantin Totev, 11 Tsvyatko Barchovski, 12 Metodi Tomovski, 13 Viktor Radev, 14 Emanuil Gyaurov (Coach: Bozhidar Takev)

1956 Olympic Games: finished 5th among 15 teams

3 Atanas Atanasov, 4 Vladimir Savov, 5 Iliya Mirchev, 6 Viktor Radev, 7 Georgi Kanev, 8 Vasil Manchenko, 9 Georgi Panov, 10 Konstantin Totev, 11 Tsvetko Slavov, 12 Lyubomir Panov, 13 Nikolay Ilov (Coach: Lyudmil Katerinski)

1957 EuroBasket: finished (silver) among 16 teams

3 Mihail Semov, 4 Vladimir Ganchev, 5 Iliya Mirchev, 6 Viktor Radev, 7 Georgi Kanev, 8 Petko Lazarov, 9 Georgi Panov, 10 Konstantin Totev, 11 Tsvetko Slavov, 12 Lyubomir Panov, 13 Metodi Tomovski, 14 Atanas Atanasov (Coach: Lyudmil Katerinski)

1959 FIBA World Cup: finished 7th among 13 teams

3 Mihail Semov, 4 Gencho Hristov, 5 Iliya Mirchev, 6 Viktor Radev, 7 Georgi Kanev, 8 Petko Lazarov, 9 Georgi Panov, 10 Emanuil Gyaurov, 11 Tsvetko Slavov, 12 Lyubomir Panov, 13 Metodi Tomovski, 14 Atanas Atanasov (Coach: Lyudmil Katerinski)

1959 EuroBasket: finished 5th among 17 teams

3 Angel Shipkov, 5 Iliya Mirchev, 6 Viktor Radev, 7 Georgi Kanev, 8 Petko Lazarov, 9 Georgi Panov, 10 Hristo Donchev, 12 Mihail Semov, 13 Nikolay Ilov, 14 Atanas Atanasov, 15 Tsvetko Slavov, 16 Gencho Hristov (Coach: Lyudmil Katerinski)

1960 Olympic Games: finished 16th among 16 teams

3 Stefan Stoykov, 5 Iliya Mirchev, 6 Viktor Radev, 7 Georgi Kanev, 8 Petko Lazarov, 9 Georgi Panov, 10 Emanuil Gyaurov, 11 Tsvetko Slavov, 12 Lyubomir Panov, 13 Nikolay Ilov, 14 Atanas Atanasov, 15 Hristo Tsvetkov (Coach: Nikola Kolev)

1961 EuroBasket: finished (bronze) among 19 teams

4 Mincho Dimov, 5 Iliya Mirchev, 6 Viktor Radev, 7 Stefan Stoykov, 8 Petko Lazarov, 9 Georgi Panov, 10 Hristo Donchev, 11 Tsvetko Slavov, 12 Lyubomir Panov, 13 Hristo Tsvetkov, 14 Atanas Atanasov, 15 Radko Zlatev (Coach: Veselin Temkov)

1963 EuroBasket: finished 5th among 16 teams

4 Stefan Filipov, 5 Iliya Mirchev, 6 Viktor Radev, 7 Georgi Kanev, 8 Mincho Dimov, 9 Georgi Panov, 10 Dimitar Donev, 11 Tsvetko Slavov, 12 Lyubomir Panov, 13 Nikola Atanasov, 14 Atanas Atanasov, 15 Kliment Kamenarov (Coach: Kiril Haytov)

1965 EuroBasket: finished 5th among 16 teams

4 Mincho Dimov, 6 Pando Pandov, 7 Georgi Barzakov, 8 Emil Mihaylov, 9 Valentin Spasov, 10 Kamen Ilchev, 11 Stefan Filipov, 12 Borislav Kolev, 13 Slavey Raychev, 14 Atanas Atanasov, 15 Radko Zlatev, 16 Boto Paspalanov (Coach: Kiril Semov)

1967 EuroBasket: finished 4th among 16 teams

4 Emil Mihaylov, 5 Slavey Raychev, 6 Pando Pandov, 7 Hristo Doychinov, 8 Georgi Genev, 9 Boris Krastev, 10 Mincho Dimov, 11 Tsvyatko Barchovski, 12 Ivan Vodenicharski, 13 Boycho Branzov, 14 Temelaki Dimitrov, 15 Georgi Hristov (Coach: Kiril Haytov)

1968 Olympic Games: finished 10th among 16 teams

4 Emil Mihaylov, 5 Stanislav Boyadzhiev, 6 Pando Pandov, 7 Hristo Doychinov, 8 Valentin Spasov, 9 Stefan Filipov, 10 Mincho Dimov, 11 Ivaylo Kirov, 12 Dimitar Sahanikov, 13 Boycho Branzov, 14 Slavey Raychev, 15 Georgi Hristov (Coach: Kiril Haytov)

1969 EuroBasket: finished 7th among 12 teams

4 Hristo Doychinov, 5 Rumen Peychev, 6 Atanas Golomeev, 7 Dimitar Galabov, 8 Ivan Rusinov, 9 Georgi Barzakov, 10 Mincho Dimov, 11 Bogomil Chanev, 12 Stancho Kostov, 13 Boycho Branzov, 14 Temelaki Dimitrov, 15 Georgi Hristov (Coach: Dimitar Mitev)

1971 EuroBasket: finished 6th among 12 teams

4 Rumen Peychev, 5 Stefan Filipov, 6 Pando Pandov, 7 Hristo Doychinov, 9 lliya Yankov, 10 Boto Paspalanov, 11 Atanas Golomeev, 12 Docho Petrov, 13 Ivaylo Kirov, 14 Slavey Raychev, 15 Georgi Hristov, 16 Bogomil Chanev (Coach: Dimitar Mitev)

1973 EuroBasket: finished 6th among 12 teams

4 Hristo Doychinov, 5 Georgi Stoyanov, 6 Pando Pandov, 7 Rumen Peychev, 8 Ivaylo Kirov, 9 Hristo Borisov, 10 Marin Romanski, 11 Atanas Golomeev, 12 Boris Krastev, 13 Boycho Branzov, 14 Bogomil Chanev, 15 Georgi Hristov (Coach: Neycho Neychev)

1975 EuroBasket: finished 5th among 12 teams

4 Hristo Doychinov, 5 Valentin Petkov, 6 Atanas Stoyanov, 7 Docho Petrov, 8 Mihail Mihaylov, 9 Valentin Sharkov, 10 Marin Romanski, 11 Atanas Golomeev, 12 Mihail Dukov, 13 Boycho Branzov, 14 Temelaki Dimitrov, 15 Georgi Hristov (Coach: Ivan Kolev)

1977 EuroBasket: finished 6th among 12 teams

4 Milko Arabadzhiyski, 5 Liyuben Yosifov, 6 Petko Marinov, 7 Stoyan Shantov, 8 Iliya Evtimov, 9 Mihail Smochevski, 10 Valentin Sharkov, 11 Atanas Golomeev, 12 Plamen Takev, 13 Atanas Kolev, 14 Todor Bogdanov, 15 Rumen Peychev (Coach: Neycho Neychev)

1979 EuroBasket: finished 11th among 12 teams

4 Georgi Glouchkov, 5 Atanas Kolev, 6 Dimitar Donov, 7 Mihail Manolov, 8 Iliya Evtimov, 9 Hristo Borissov, 10 Valentin Sharkov, 11 Rumen Peychev, 12 Ognyan Rusev, 13 Milko Arabadzhiyski, 14 Todor Bogdanov, 15 Dimitar Marchin (Coach: Ivan Todorov)

1985 EuroBasket: finished 8th among 12 teams

4 Koyo Koev, 5 Atanas Kolev, 6 Yordan Kolev, 7 Rosen Barchovski, 8 Iliya Evtimov, 9 Sashko Vezenkov, 10 Ivan Tsenov, 11 Georgi Mladenov, 12 Tsvetan Antov, 13 Emil Yonov, 14 Georgi Glouchkov, 15 Lyubomir Amiorkov (Coach: Tsvyatko Barchovski)

1989 EuroBasket: finished 7th among 8 teams

4 Koyo Koev, 5 Eduard Valchev, 6 Yordan Kolev, 7 Robert Gergov, 8 Georgi Glouchkov, 9 Ventsislav Slavov, 10 Ivan Tsenov, 11 Sashko Vezenkov, 12 Georgi Mladenov, 13 Emil Yonov, 14 Tsvetan Antov, 15 Lyubomir Amiorkov (Coach: Kiril Semov)

1991 EuroBasket: finished 8th among 8 teams

4 Ivaylo Ravutsov, 5 Cvetan Nedelchev, 6 Yordan Kolev, 7 Robert Gergov, 8 Spas Natov, 9 Plamen Petrov, 10 Ivan Tsenov, 11 Sashko Vezenkov, 12 Georgi Mladenov, 13 Daniel Dimitrov, 14 Georgi Glouchkov, 15 Lubomir Amiorkov (Coach: Simeon Varchev)

1993 EuroBasket: finished 16th among 16 teams

4 Stanislav Stankov, 5 Anton Haralanov, 6 Dimo Kostov, 7 Ivaylo Ravutsov, 8 Spas Natov, 9 Ventsislav Slavov, 10 Daniel Dimitrov, 11 Vladimir Dimitrov, 12 Georgi Mladenov, 13 Vasil Stoyanov, 14 Robert Gergov, 15 Lubomir Amiorkov (Coach: Simeon Varchev)

2005 EuroBasket: finished 13th among 16 teams

4 Deyan Ivanov, 5 Kaloyan Ivanov, 6 Tencho Banev, 7 Yulian Radionov, 8 Filip Videnov, 9 Yordan Bozov, 10 Georgi Davidov, 11 Dimitar Angelov, 12 Stefan Georgiev, 13 Boyko Mladenov, 14 Hrisimir Dimitrov, 15 Todor Stoykov (Coach: Rosen Barchovski)

2009 EuroBasket: finished 16th among 16 teams

4 Deyan Ivanov, 5 Kaloyan Ivanov, 6 Chavdar Kostov, 7 Earl Rowland, 8 Filip Videnov, 9 Stanislav Slaveykov, 10 Stefan Georgiev, 11 Dimitar Angelov, 12 Vassil Evtimov, 13 Boyko Mladenov, 14 Bozhidar Avramov, 15 Todor Stoykov (Coach: Pini Gershon)

2011 EuroBasket: finished 13th among 24 teams

4 Deyan Ivanov, 5 Kaloyan Ivanov, 6 Earl Rowland, 7 Chavdar Kostov, 8 Filip Videnov, 9 Pavel Marinov, 10 Bozhidar Avramov, 11 Zlatin Georgiev, 12 Aleksandar Yanev, 13 Asen Velikov, 14 Tencho Banev, 15 Nikolay Varbanov (Coach: Rosen Barchovski)

2022 EuroBasket: finished 20th among 24 teams

0 Ivan Alipiev, 1 Dee Bost, 2 Deyan Karamfilov, 9 Chavdar Kostov (C), 12 Aleksandar Yanev, 17 Emil Stoilov, 22 Pavlin Ivanov,
23 Stanimir Marinov, 24 Andrey Ivanov, 34 Dimitar Dimitrov, 41 Aleksandar Vezenkov, 99 Aleks Simeonov (Coach: Rosen Barchovski)

== See also ==
- Sport in Bulgaria
- Bulgaria women's national basketball team
- Bulgaria men's national under-20 basketball team
- Bulgaria men's national under-18 basketball team
- Bulgaria men's national under-16 basketball team
