= EuroBasket 1961 =

International basketball event

Европско првенство у кошарци 1961. Europsko prvenstvo u košarci 1961.

Tournament details
- Host country: Yugoslavia
- City: Belgrade
- Dates: 29 April - 8 May
- Teams: 19
- Venue(s): 1 (in 1 host city)

Final positions
- Champions: Soviet Union (6th title)
- Runners-up: Yugoslavia
- Third place: Bulgaria
- Fourth place: France

Tournament statistics
- MVP: (Socialist Federal Republic of Yugoslavia) Radivoj Korać
- Top scorer: (Socialist Federal Republic of Yugoslavia) Radivoj Korać (24.0 points per game)

The 1961 FIBA European Championship, commonly called FIBA EuroBasket 1961, was the twelfth FIBA EuroBasket regional basketball championship, held by FIBA Europe. Nineteen national teams affiliated with the International Basketball Federation (FIBA) took art in the competition. The tournament was hosted by Yugoslavia, and was held at the Belgrade City Fair.

== First round ==
=== Group A ===
Match	Team 1	Team 2	1.H.	2.H.	O.T	
A1	Poland	England	47:15	31:19	–	78:34
A2	Yugoslavia	Greece	36:27	50:30	–	86:57
A3	England	Yugoslavia	18:49	40:73	–	58:122
A4	Poland	Greece	40:24	37:22	–	77:46
A5	Greece	England	39:25	39:18	–	78:43
A6	Poland	Yugoslavia	34:38	33:34	–	67:72

Pos.	Team	Matches	Wins	Losses	Results	Points	Diff.
1	Yugoslavia	3	3	0	280:182	6	+98
2	Poland	3	2	1	222:152	5	+70
3	Greece	3	1	2	181:206	4	−25
4	England	3	0	3	135:278	3	−143

=== Group B ===
Match	Team 1	Team 2	1.H.	2.H.	O.T	
B1	East Germany	Hungary	24:40	40:23	–	64:63
B2	Hungary	Finland	34:16	31:42	–	65:58
B3	East Germany	Finland	38:27	39:37	–	77:64

Pos.	Team	Matches	Wins	Losses	Results	Points	Diff.
1	East Germany	2	2	0	141:127	4	+14
2	Hungary	2	1	1	128:122	3	+6
3	Finland	2	0	2	122:142	2	−20

=== Group C ===
Match	Team 1	Team 2	1.H.	2.H.	O.T	
C1	Belgium	Soviet Union	25:39	23:50	–	48:89
C2	Belgium	Spain	41:29	29:38	–	70:67
C3	Spain	Soviet Union	28:46	21:36	–	49:82

Pos.	Team	Matches	Wins	Losses	Results	Points	Diff.
1	Soviet Union	2	2	0	171:97	4	+74
2	Belgium	2	1	1	118:156	3	−38
3	Spain	2	0	2	116:152	2	−36

=== Group D ===
Match	Team 1	Team 2	1.H.	2.H.	O.T	
D1	Israel	West Germany	29:18	41:23	–	70:41
D2	West Germany	Bulgaria	23:32	24:38	–	47:70
D3	Bulgaria	Israel	21:27	27:15	–	48:42

Pos.	Team	Matches	Wins	Losses	Results	Points	Diff.
1	Bulgaria	2	2	0	118:89	4	+29
2	Israel	2	1	1	112:89	3	+23
3	West Germany	2	0	2	88:140	2	−52

=== Group E ===
Match	Team 1	Team 2	1.H.	2.H.	O.T	
E1	Sweden	Czechoslovakia	14:29	19:29	–	33:58
E2	Czechoslovakia	Turkey	37:38	33:39	–	70:77
E3	Turkey	Sweden	30:11	25:29	–	55:40

Pos.	Team	Matches	Wins	Losses	Results	Points	Diff.
1	Turkey	2	2	0	132:110	4	+22
2	Czechoslovakia	2	1	1	128:110	3	+18
3	Sweden	2	0	2	73:113	2	−40

=== Group F ===
Match	Team 1	Team 2	1.H.	2.H.	O.T	
F1	France	Romania	30:37	36:31	–	66:68
F2	Romania	Netherlands	46:32	38:34	–	84:66
F3	France	Netherlands	48:20	43:34	–	91:54

Pos.	Team	Matches	Wins	Losses	Results	Points	Diff.
1	Romania	2	2	0	152:132	4	+20
2	France	2	1	1	157:122	3	+35
3	Netherlands	2	0	2	120:175	2	−55

== Second round ==
=== Group 1 ===
Match	Team 1	Team 2	1.H.	2.H.	O.T	
1/1	Yugoslavia	East Germany	34:37	48:36	–	82:73
1/2	Poland	Hungary	23:32	20:21	–	43:53
1/3	Soviet Union	Poland	38:26	29:27	–	67:53
1/4	Yugoslavia	Belgium	37:33	48:26	–	85:59
1/5	East Germany	Soviet Union	18:39	22:32	–	40:71
1/6	Belgium	Poland	35:28	31:34	–	66:62
1/7	Yugoslavia	Hungary	37:26	35:40	–	72:66
1/8	Belgium	East Germany	36:34	33:29	–	69:63
1/9	Hungary	Soviet Union	15:44	16:49	–	31:93
1/10	Hungary	Belgium	31:30	28:31	–	59:61
1/11	Poland	East Germany	35:34	47:37	–	82:71
1/12	Yugoslavia	Soviet Union	33:42	25:33	–	58:75

Pos.	Team	Matches	Wins	Losses	Results	Points	Diff.
1	Soviet Union	5	5	0	395:230	10	+165
2	Yugoslavia	5	4	1	369:340	9	+29
3	Belgium	5	3	2	303:358	8	−55
4	Hungary	5	1	4	272:333	6	−61
5	Poland	5	1	4	307:329	6	−22
6	East Germany	5	1	4	311:367	6	−56

=== Group 2 ===
Match	Team 1	Team 2	1.H.	2.H.	O.T	
2/1	Israel	Czechoslovakia	30:27	21:37	–	51:64
2/2	Bulgaria	Turkey	31:28	29:29	–	60:57
2/3	Romania	Israel	32:25	30:17	–	62:42
2/4	Bulgaria	France	22:42	36:29	–	58:71
2/5	Turkey	Romania	26:26	20:24	–	46:50
2/6	France	Israel	25:14	39:27	–	64:41
2/7	Bulgaria	Czechoslovakia	35:31	27:29	–	62:60
2/8	Czechoslovakia	Romania	30:31	22:24	–	52:55
2/9	France	Turkey	40:25	34:32	–	74:57
2/10	Czechoslovakia	France	27:28	35:38	–	62:66
2/11	Israel	Turkey	28:14	29:36	–	57:50
2/12	Bulgaria	Romania	34:28	29:23	–	63:51

Pos.	Team	Matches	Wins	Losses	Results	Points	Diff.
1	France	5	4	1	341:286	9	+55
2	Bulgaria	5	4	1	291:281	9	+10
3	Romania	5	4	1	286:269	9	+17
4	Czechoslovakia	5	1	4	308:311	6	−3
5	Turkey	5	1	4	287:311	6	−24
6	Israel	5	1	4	233:288	6	−55

== Classification round ==
=== Group 1 ===
Match	Team 1	Team 2	1.H.	2.H.	O.T	
1/1	Sweden	Netherlands	26:21	21:27	–	47:48
1/2	West Germany	Sweden	28:16	20:27	–	48:43
1/3	Netherlands	West Germany	24:21	24:25	–	48:46

Pos.	Team	Matches	Wins	Losses	Results	Points	Diff.
1	Netherlands	2	2	0	96:93	4	+3
2	West Germany	2	1	1	94:91	3	+3
3	Sweden	2	0	2	90:96	2	−6

=== Group 2 ===
Match	Team 1	Team 2	1.H.	2.H.	O.T	
2/1	Finland	England	25:16	46:22	–	71:38
2/2	Greece	Spain	17:37	29:36	–	46:73
2/3	Spain	England	44:24	55:26	–	99:50
2/4	Greece	Finland	40:37	31:40	–	71:77
2/5	Finland	Spain	30:57	23:42	–	53:99

Pos.	Team	Matches	Wins	Losses	Results	Points	Diff.
1	Spain	3	3	0	271:149	6	+122
2	Finland	3	2	1	201:208	5	−7
3	Greece	3	1	2	195:193	4	+2
4	England	3	0	3	131:248	3	−117

=== 13th-16th place classification playoffs ===
13th-16th place semifinals
55
Finland	79
Netherlands	72
56
Spain	62
West Germany	49

13th place game
59
Spain	61
Finland	60
15th place game
58
Netherlands	56
West Germany	53

Match	Team 1	Team 2	1.H.	2.H.	O.T	
55	Finland	Netherlands	40:35	39:37	–	79:72
56	Spain	West Germany	29:23	33:26	–	62:49
58	Netherlands	West Germany	27:20	29:33	–	56:53
59	Spain	Finland	36:34	25:26	–	61:60

=== 17th-19th place classification playoffs ===
17th-19th place semifinals
54
England	41
Sweden	70
Greece
BYE

17th place game
57
Sweden	47
Greece	60
19th place game
England

Match	Team 1	Team 2	1.H.	2.H.	O.T	
54	England	Sweden	20:27	21:43	–	41:70
57	Sweden	Greece	24:42	23:18	–	47:60

== Final round ==
=== Medals round ===
Semi-finals
64
Yugoslavia	75
France	65
65
Soviet Union	77
Bulgaria	54

Final
71
Yugoslavia	53
Soviet Union	60
Third place
70
France	46
Bulgaria	55

=== 5th-8th place playoffs ===
5th-8th place semifinals
61
Hungary	71
Romania	60
63
Belgium	65
Czechoslovakia	74

5th place game
69
Hungary	48
Czechoslovakia	53
7th place game
68
Romania	71
Belgium	61

=== 9th-12th place playoffs ===
9th-12th place semifinals
60
East Germany	50
Turkey	63
62
Poland	74
Israel	59

9th place game
67
Turkey	59
Poland	74
11th place game
66
East Germany	80
Israel	83

1961 FIBA EuroBasket champions

Soviet Union
6th title

== Final standings ==
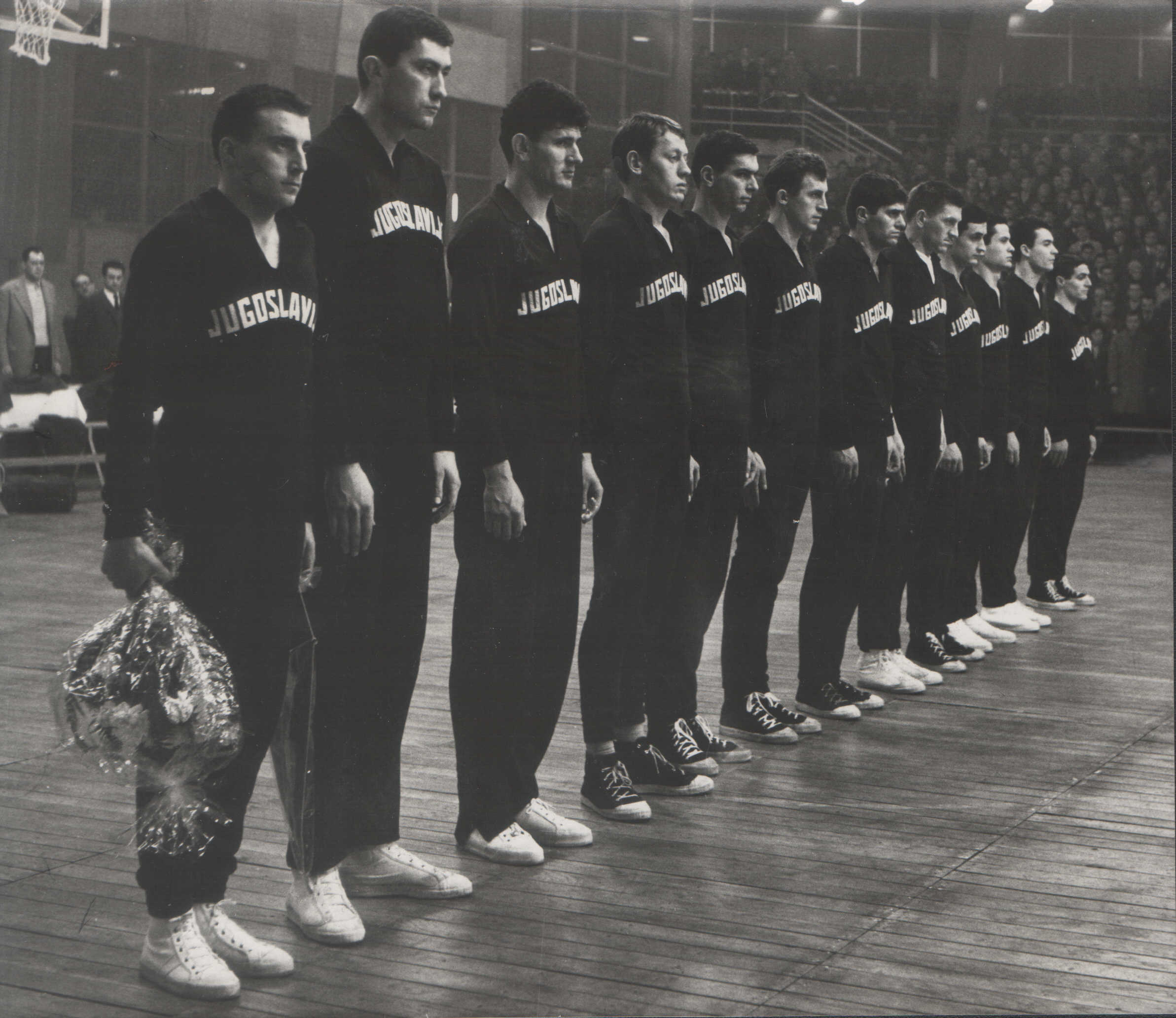
Host team Yugoslavia—shown here lining up before a game at the tournament—lost the final versus the Soviet Union, finishing EuroBasket 1961 in second place, its first ever medal at a major international competition.

1. Soviet Union
2. Yugoslavia
3. Bulgaria
4. France
5. Czechoslovakia
6. Hungary
7. Romania
8. Belgium
9. Poland
10. Turkey
11. Israel
12. East Germany
13. Spain
14. Finland
15. Netherlands
16. West Germany
17. Greece
18. Sweden
19. England

== Team rosters ==
1. Soviet Union: Jānis Krūmiņš, Gennadi Volnov, Valdis Muižnieks, Maigonis Valdmanis, Viktor Zubkov, Armenak Alachachian, Yuri Korneev, Vladimir Ugrekhelidze, Aleksander Petrov, Aleksandr Kandel, Viacheslav Novikov, Albert Valtin (Coach: Stepan Spandaryan)

2. Yugoslavia: Radivoj Korać, Ivo Daneu, Slobodan Gordić, Radovan Radović, Nemanja Đurić, Vital Eiselt, Sreten Dragojlović, Marjan Kandus, Miha Lokar, Miodrag Nikolić, Zvonko Petričević, Željko Troskot (Coach: Aleksandar Nikolić)

3. Bulgaria: Viktor Radev, Mincho Dimov, Ljubomir Panov, Georgi Panov, Atanas Atanasov, Ilija Mirchev, Petko Lazarov, Tsvetko Savov, Khristo Tsvetkov, Khristo Donev, Radko Zlatev, Stefan Stojkov (Coach: Veselin Temkov)

4. France: Jean-Paul Beugnot, Henri Grange, Christian Baltzer, Bernard Mayeur, Michel Rat, Lucien Sedat, Jerome Christ, Michel House, Michel le Ray, Andre Goisbault, Jean-Claude Vergne, Andre Souvre (Coach: André Buffière)
