= EuroBasket 1951 =

International basketball event

Championnat d'Europe masculin de basket-ball 1951

Tournament details
- Host country: France
- City: Paris
- Dates: 3–12 May
- Teams: 18
- Venue: 1 (in 1 host city)

Final positions
- Champions: Soviet Union (2nd title)
- Runners-up: Czechoslovakia
- Third place: France
- Fourth place: Bulgaria

Tournament statistics
- Games played: 73
- MVP: (Czechoslovakia) Ivan Mrázek
- Top scorer: (Czechoslovakia) Ivan Mrázek (17.1 points per game)

The 1951 FIBA European Championship, commonly called FIBA EuroBasket 1951, was the seventh FIBA EuroBasket regional basketball championship, held by the International Basketball Federation (FIBA). Eighteen national teams affiliated with FIBA entered the competition, a record number and more than twice the number that had competed two years earlier. The competition was hosted by France, who had taken second place at EuroBasket 1949, behind 1949 hosts Egypt. The Vélodrome d'hiver, Paris was the location of the event.

73 matches were held over the course of the tournament, including three walkovers caused when Romania withdrew after the draw.

== Results ==
=== First round ===
In the preliminary round, the 18 teams were split up into four groups. Two of the groups had five teams each, with the others having four each. Romania withdrew, leaving 2 groups of 5, 1 group of 4, and 1 group of 3. The top two teams in each group advanced to the quarterfinal round. The seven teams that had placed third and fourth moved into the classification rounds, leaving one more spot in that round two be contested in a head-to-head match between the two fifth-place teams.

==== Group A ====
Rank	Team	Pts	W	L	PF	PA	Diff
1.	Italy	7	3	1	233	132	+101
2.	France	7	3	1	232	146	+86
3.	Netherlands	7	3	1	172	177	−5
4.	Switzerland	5	1	3	180	214	−34
5.	Luxembourg	4	0	4	114	262	−148

France	49–37	Italy
Netherlands	50–48	France
France	72–26	Luxembourg
France	63–33	Switzerland
Italy	53–28	Netherlands
Luxembourg	20–76	Italy
Italy	67–35	Switzerland
Luxembourg	32–46	Netherlands
Switzerland	44–48	Netherlands
Luxembourg	36–68	Switzerland

==== Group B ====
Rank	Team	Pts	W	L	PF	PA	Diff
1.	Soviet Union	8	4	0	312	117	+195
2.	Turkey	7	3	1	227	154	+73
3.	Finland	6	2	2	175	180	−5
4.	Austria	5	1	3	112	200	−88
5.	Denmark	4	0	4	94	269	−175

Soviet Union	58–34	Turkey
Denmark	13–109	Soviet Union
Soviet Union	71–34	Austria
Finland	36–74	Soviet Union
Turkey	83–36	Denmark
Austria	18–50	Turkey
Turkey	60–42	Finland
Denmark	26–33	Austria
Finland	44–19	Denmark
Austria	27–53	Finland

==== Group C ====
Rank	Team	Pts	W	L	PF	PA	Diff
1.	Bulgaria	6	3	0	147	70	+77
2.	Greece	5	2	1	121	103	+18
3.	Portugal	4	1	2	69	158	−89
4.	Romania (withdrew)	0	0	3	0	6	−6

Greece	38–68	Bulgaria
Portugal	35–81	Greece
Greece	2–0 (Awarded)	Romania
Bulgaria	77–32	Portugal
Bulgaria	2–0 (Awarded)	Romania
Portugal	2–0 (Awarded)	Romania

==== Group D ====
Rank	Team	Pts	W	L	PF	PA	Diff
1.	Belgium	6	3	0	208	81	+127
2.	Czechoslovakia	5	2	1	203	99	+104
3.	West Germany	4	1	2	117	157	−40
4.	Scotland	3	0	3	68	259	−191

Czechoslovakia	38–51	Belgium
Scotland	18 – 103	Czechoslovakia
Czechoslovakia	62–30	West Germany
Belgium	87–25	Scotland
West Germany	18–70	Belgium
Scotland	25–69	West Germany

=== Elimination game ===
The two fifth-placed teams from the preliminary groups, Denmark and Luxembourg, played a single elimination game for the honor of being the eighth team in the consolation round. The game was perhaps the closest in Eurobasket history; it was tied at 45–45 with Peter Tatalls at the free throw line with 5 seconds left. Tatalls made the shot, putting Denmark ahead 46–45. Luxembourg moved the ball up to about half-court before attempting a shot just before time expired. The shot bounced off the rim, eliminating Luxembourg from the tournament and giving Denmark their first win of the tournament as they moved into the classification round to play for 9th–16th places.

Denmark	46–45	Luxembourg

=== Classification round 1 ===
The first classification round was played in two round-robin groups. Teams advanced into the second classification round depending on their results in the first round—first and second place teams played in the 9th–12th places segment of classification round 2 while third and fourth place teams played for 13th to 16th places.

==== Group 1 ====
Rank	Team	Pts	W	L	PF	PA	Diff
1.	Austria	6	3	0	118	102	+16
2.	West Germany	4	1	2	132	129	+3
3.	Switzerland	4	1	2	134	136	−2
4.	Portugal	4	1	2	122	139	−17

West Germany	47–39	Portugal
Austria	39–37	West Germany
Switzerland	51–48	West Germany
Portugal	31–43	Austria
Switzerland	49–52	Portugal
Switzerland	34–36	Austria

==== Group 2 ====
Rank	Team	Pts	W	L	PF	PA	Diff
1.	Finland	6	3	0	201	119	+82
2.	Netherlands	5	2	1	162	111	+51
3.	Denmark	4	1	2	99	158	−59
4.	Scotland	3	0	3	101	175	−74

Finland	66–52	Netherlands
Scotland	32–73	Finland
Denmark	35–62	Finland
Netherlands	55–28	Scotland
Denmark	17–55	Netherlands
Denmark	47–41	Scotland

=== Classification round 2 ===
==== 13th-16th place classification playoffs ====
13th-16th place semifinals
Denmark	46
Portugal	39
Switzerland	68
Scotland	19

13th place game
Denmark	22
Switzerland	54
Third place
Portugal	49
Scotland	42

==== 9th-12th place classification playoffs ====
9th-12th place semifinals
Finland	67
West Germany	56
Austria	28
Netherlands	44

9th place game
Finland	57
Netherlands	52
Third place
West Germany	49
Austria	51

=== Quarterfinals ===
The quarterfinal round was played in two round-robin groups. Teams advanced into the final round depending on their results in the first round—the top two teams advanced to the medals round, while third and fourth ranked teams played for 5th to 8th places.

==== Group A ====
Rank	Team	Pts	W	L	PF	PA	Diff
1.	France	5	2	1	149	140	+9
2.	Bulgaria	5	2	1	152	142	+10
3.	Turkey	5	2	1	125	124	+1
4.	Belgium	3	0	3	122	142	−20

Belgium	41–51	Bulgaria
Turkey	38–32	Belgium
France	53–49	Belgium
Bulgaria	52–45	Turkey
France	56–49	Bulgaria
France	40–42	Turkey

==== Group B ====
Rank	Team	Pts	W	L	PF	PA	Diff
1.	Soviet Union	6	3	0	175	121	+54
2.	Czechoslovakia	5	2	1	157	127	+30
3.	Italy	4	1	2	140	177	−37
4.	Greece	3	0	3	133	180	−47

Soviet Union	60–42	Italy
Czechoslovakia	37–53	Soviet Union
Greece	42–62	Soviet Union
Italy	34–66	Czechoslovakia
Greece	51–64	Italy
Greece	40–54	Czechoslovakia

=== Final round ===
==== 5th-8th place classification playoffs ====
5th-8th place semifinals
B3	Italy	48
A4	Belgium	36
A3	Turkey	42
B4	Greece	36

5th place game
B3	Italy	43
A3	Turkey	38
7th place game
A4	Belgium	39
B4	Greece	28

==== Classification 5–8 ====
Italy	48–36	Belgium
Turkey	42–36	Greece

===== Classification 7/8 =====
Belgium	39–28	Greece

===== Classification 5/6 =====
Italy	43–38	Turkey

=== Medal Round: Bracket ===
Semifinals
A1	France	50
B2	Czechoslovakia	59
B1	Soviet Union	72
A2	Bulgaria	54

EuroBasket Final
B2	Czechoslovakia	44
B1	Soviet Union	45
Bronze Medal Game
A1	France	55
A2	Bulgaria	52

==== Semifinals ====
France	50–59	Czechoslovakia
Soviet Union	72–54	Bulgaria

===== Bronze-medal match =====
France	55–52	Bulgaria

===== Championship =====
Czechoslovakia	44–45	Soviet Union

1951 FIBA EuroBasket champions

Soviet Union
2nd title

== Final standings ==
1. Soviet Union
2. Czechoslovakia
3. France
4. Bulgaria
5. Italy
6. Turkey
7. Belgium
8. Greece
9. Finland
10. Netherlands
11. Austria
12. West Germany
13. Switzerland
14. Denmark
15. Portugal
16. Scotland
17. Luxembourg
18. Romania

== Team rosters ==
1. Soviet Union: Otar Korkia, Stepas Butautas, Joann Lõssov, Anatoly Konev, Ilmar Kullam, Heino Kruus, Alexander Moiseev, Justinas Lagunavičius, Anatoly Belov, Vasili Kolpakov, Yuri Larionov, Evgeni Nikitin, Viktor Vlasov, Oleg Mamontov (Coach: Stepan Spandaryan)

2. Czechoslovakia: Ivan Mrázek, Jiri Baumruk, Zdeněk Bobrovský, Miroslav Skerik, Jaroslav Šíp, Jan Kozák, Miroslav Baumruk, Karel Belohradsky, Miroslav Dostal, Jindrich Kinsky, Zoltan Krenicky, Jiri Matousek, Milos Nebuchla, Arnost Novak, Karel Sobota, Zdenek Rylich, Stanislav Vykydal (Coach: Josef Andrle)

3. France: André Buffiere, René Chocat, Jacques Dessemme, Louis Devoti, Jacques Freimuller, Robert Guillin, Robert Monclar, Marc Peironne, Marc Quiblier, Jean-Pierre Salignon, Pierre Thiolon, André Vacheresse, Jean Perniceni, Justy Specker (Coach: Robert Busnel)

4. Bulgaria: Georgi Georgiev, Stefan Bankov, Nejcho Nejchev, Vladimir Slavov, Ilija Asenov, Petar Shishkov, Kiril Semov, Konstantin Totev, Anton Kuzov, Gencho Rashkov, Ivan Vladimirov, Dimitar Popov, Metodi Tomovski (Coach: Veselin Temkov)
