= PBC Academic =

Academic Metropol-Region
- Nickname: Metropol (Метропол)
- Leagues: BBL
- Founded: 1947; 79 years ago
- History: PBC Academic (1947–2020)
- Arena: Universiada Hall
- Capacity: 4,000
- Location: Sofia, Bulgaria
- Team colors: Yellow and Blue
- President: Viktor Vladov
- Team manager: Viktor Vladov, Georgi Petrov
- Head coach: Eduard Valchev
- Championships: 26 Bulgarian Leagues; 11 Bulgarian Cups; 1 Bulgarian Super Cups; 1 International Students' Cup
Home	Away

BC Academic Metropol Region (Bulgarian: БК "Академик" Метропол-Рийджън) is a reestablished Bulgarian professional basketball club based in the capital Sofia.

In April 2022, Academic has been reborn and rebranded by the new owners, the German-Bulgarian ex-professional basketball players Viktor Vladov and Georgi Petrov. Founded in 1947 as part of the Academic Sofia sports club, they have won the championship of Bulgaria 26 times, won the Bulgarian Cup 11 times and won the Bulgarian Super Cup 1 time. Among their international honours are two FIBA European Champions Cup finals (both lost to Rīgas ASK) in 1958 and 1959 and an International Students' Cup in 1957.

In 2000, the team were renamed Lukoil Academic as a sponsorship deal was signed with Russian oil giant Lukoil, and quickly established themselves as dominant in the Bulgarian Championship. Since then they have been a regular ULEB Cup participant, and won the FIBA Europe Regional Challenge Cup Conference South in 2003. In September 2020, Academic withdrew from the NBL and announced that it will no longer maintain a professional team.

They played their home games at the Universiade Hall. After the rebranding and reestablishing to "BC Academic Metropol Region" in April 2022, the club competes in the Bulgarian A-Grupa.

== History ==
Basketball club Academic Sofia was founded in 1947 as a part of the students' sports association, Academic. Under coach Bozhidar Takev, they were twice finalists in the European Championships against Rīgas ASK in 1958 and 1959.

The tradition of the club was revived again in 2000 when Lukoil Bulgaria became the main sponsor of the team. The selection of Lukoil Academic was originated towards young players, who with senior coach Petko Marinov and his assistants built the youngest team in the republican's basketball league. The renewed school was also known for the work by adolescents of the club, for which some players had already shown considerable success at the during home championships. The players of Petko Marinov won the cup of their country and played the most attractive final in the play-offs in the championship, for the last ten years. The modo of the club consists of the republican champion's titles and one of the best performances in the European club tournaments. In 2018, Lukoil announced its sponsor deal with Levski Sofia, while leaving Academic with a smaller budget.

== Honours ==
=== Domestic competitions ===
- Bulgarian League

Winners (26): 1957, 1958, 1959, 1963, 1968, 1969, 1970, 1971, 1972, 1973, 1975, 1976, 2003, 2004, 2005, 2006, 2007, 2008, 2009, 2010, 2011, 2012, 2013, 2015, 2016, 2017

- Bulgarian Cup

Winners (11): 1952, 1954, 2002, 2003, 2004, 2006, 2007, 2008, 2011, 2012, 2013

- Bulgarian Basketball Super Cup

Winners (1): 2016
Runners-up (1): 2017

=== European competitions ===
- EuroLeague

Runners-up (2): 1958, 1958–59

- FIBA Europe Conference South

Winners(1): 2003

=== Worldwide competitions ===
- International Students' Cup

Winners (1): 1957

== Season by season ==
Season	Tier	League	Pos.	W–L	Bulgarian Cup	European competitions		
2013–14	1	NBL	2nd			2 Eurocup	RS	4–6
2014–15	1	NBL	1st	31–4	Runners-up	3 EuroChallenge	RS	2–4
2015–16	1	NBL	1st	33–2	Runners-up	3 FIBA Europe Cup	R2	5–7
2016–17	1	NBL	1st	28–7	Runners-up	3 Champions League	QR2	1–1
2016–17	1	NBL	1st	28–7	Runners-up	4 FIBA Europe Cup	R2	7–5
2017–18	1	NBL	6th	10-14	1/4 final	3 Champions League	QR3	2–2
2017–18	1	NBL	6th	10-14	1/4 final	4 FIBA Europe Cup	RS	2–4
2018-19	1	NBL	8th	4-20	Semifinalist			
2019-20	1	NBL	5th	9-11	1/4 final			
2020-21								
2021-22					NALB Cup			
2022-23	2	BBL A Grupa						

== Notable players ==
Note: Flags indicate national team eligibility at FIBA-sanctioned events. Players may hold other non-FIBA nationalities not displayed.

Criteria

To appear in this section a player must have either:

- Set a club record or won an individual award while at the club
- Played at least one official international match for their national team at any time
- Played at least one official NBA match at any time.

- (Bulgaria) Lyubomir Panov
- (Bulgaria) Chavdar Kostov
- (Bulgaria) Georgi Panov
- (Bulgaria) Viktor Radev
- (Bulgaria) Hristo Nikolov
- (Bulgaria) Petar Lazarov
- (Bulgaria) Nikola Atanasov
- (Bulgaria) Atanas Golomeev
- (Bulgaria) Stefan Filipov
- (Bulgaria) Slavey Raychev
- (United States) Charles Jones
- (United States) Lamont Jones
- (United States) (Venezuela) Donta Smith
- (United States) Lamont Mack
- (United States) Dominic James
- (United States) Travis Peterson
- (United States) Antonio Burks
- (United States) (Bulgaria) Willie Deane
- (United States) (Bulgaria) Priest Lauderdale
- (United States) Bryant Smith
- (United States) Larry O'Bannon
- (United States) Dee Brown
- (United States) Taliek Brown
- (United States) Brandon Heath
- (United States) Killian Larson
- (United States) David Simon
- (United States) Anthony Beane
- (United States) Danny Gibson
- (United States) Stephen Zack
- (United States) Melsahn Basabe
- (North Macedonia) Pero Antić
- (North Macedonia) Riste Stefanov
- (North Macedonia) Gjorgji Čekovski
- (North Macedonia) Damjan Stojanovski
- (Sweden) Thomas Massamba
- (Nigeria) Kenny Adeleke
- (Latvia) Kaspars Kambala
- (United Kingdom) Kieron Achara
- (Croatia) Mate Skelin
- (Croatia) Željko Šakić
- (Croatia) Jure Lalić
- (Serbia) Nenad Čanak
- (Serbia) Nikola Dragović
- (Serbia) Bojan Popović
- (Serbia) Slavko Stefanović
- (Serbia) Branislav Ratkovica
- (Slovenia) Saša Zagorac
- (Montenegro) Filip Barović

== Head coaches ==
- (Bulgaria) Bozhidar Takev
- (Bulgaria) Veselin Temkov
- (Bulgaria) Neycho Neychev
- (Bulgaria) Tsvetan Zhelyazkov
- (Bulgaria) Petko Marinov
- (Serbia) Željko Lukajić
- (North Macedonia) Marin Dokuzovski
- (Bulgaria) Eduard Valchev
