= Bulgarian Basketball All-Star Game =

NBL All-Star Game
- Status: Inactive
- Inaugurated: 1990
- Most recent: 2017
- Organizer: BFB; NBL

The Bulgarian Basketball All-Star Game is an annual basketball event in Bulgaria, which has been organised by the Bulgarian Basketball Federation (BFB) since 1990. It is the oldest All-Star basketball event organised in Eastern Europe and it featured legendary former NBA player Georgi Glouchkov in its first edition. Many others distinguished players have been selected since then including Mike Wilkinson, Vassil Evtimov, Priest Lauderdale, Pero Antic.

The All-Star Game includes a match between a selection of the best players of the NBL League, a slam-dunk and a three-point contest. The starting five of each selection is chosen by online voting, but on some occasions the All-Star players have been chosen but the coaches.
The last edition was played in 2017.

== List of games ==
Bold: Team that won the game.

Season	Date	Arena	Attendance	Team	Score	Team	MVP
2003-04	23 April 2004	Kongresna Hall, Varna	5,000	**North**	**122**-116	South	(United States) Bryant Smith
2004-05	29 March 2005	Kongresna Hall, Varna	5,000	Bulgarian All Stars	96-**102**	**Foreign All Stars**	(United States) Christopher Garnett
2005-06	16 April 2006	Kongresna Hall, Varna	2,000	Bulgarian All Stars	86-**88**	**Foreign All Stars**	(United States) Lamont Jones
2006-07	1 April 2007	Universiada Hall, Sofia	1,750	Ledenika	98-**101**	**Aquatec**	(United States) Donta Smith
2007-08	3 March 2008	Arena Samokov, Samokov	3,000	**Toyota**	**113**-90	Ledenika	(Bulgaria) Todor Stoykov
2008-09	29 March 2009	Kongresna Hall, Varna	3,000	**Ledenika**	**98**-95	Toyota	(United States) Rob Preston
2009-10	1 April 2010	Universiada Hall, Sofia	3,000	Jacobs 3 in 1	95-**105**	**Toyota**	(United States) Donald Cole
2010-11	2 May 2011	Sports Hall Diana, Yambol	2,000	**Foreign All Stars**	**128**-126	Bulgarian All Stars	(United States) Aaron Harper
2011-12	8 April 2012	Armeets Arena, Sofia	6,000	Toyota	107-**110**	**Turkish Airlines**	(United States) Aaron Harper (2)
2012-13	26 April 2013	Armeets Arena, Sofia	2,000	**Bulgarian All Stars**	**90**-72	Foreign All Stars	(Bulgaria) Martin Durchev & (Bulgaria) Bozhidar Avramov (shared)
2013-14	23 February 2014	Kongresna Hall, Varna	3,000	**Bulgarian All Stars**	**95**-88	Foreign All Stars	(Bulgaria) Asen Velikov
2014-15	29 March 2015	Sports Hall Diana, Yambol	2000	**Turkish Airlines**	**131**-99	Volkswagen	(United States) Lenny Daniel
2015-16	27 March 2016	Arena Silia, Plovdiv	1,000	Turkish Airlines	126-126	Volkswagen	(Bulgaria) Martin Durchev
2016-17	2 April 2017	Kongresna Hall, Varna	2,000	**Turkish Airlines**	**150**-149	Skoda	(United States) Jordan Semple
2017-18	22 April 2018	Arena Botevgrad, Botevgrad	2,000	**CrediHelp**	**135**-103	Toyota	(Democratic Republic of the Congo) Omari Gudul
2018-19	22 April 2019	Arena Shumen, Shumen	1,000	**Zora**	**105**-99	Zlatna Dobrudzha	(United States) LaRon Smith
2024-25	23 March 2025	Boris Gyuderov Hall, Pernik	2,000	**Bulgarian All Stars**	**56**-53	Foreign All Stars	(Bulgaria) Chavdar Kostov

== Three-Point Shoot Contest ==
Year	Winner	Team
2004	(Bulgaria) Hrisimir Dimitrov	Levski Sofia
2005	(Bulgaria) Todor Stoykov	Lukoil Academic Sofia
2006	(Bulgaria) Tony Dechev	CSKA Sofia
2007	(Bulgaria) Todor Stoykov	Lukoil Academic Sofia
2008	(United States) Bryce Sheldon	BC Cherno More
2009	(Bulgaria) Zlatin Georgiev	Levski Sofia
2010	(Bulgaria) Aleksandar Gruev	Rilski Sportist
2011	(Bulgaria) Martin Durchev	BC Yambol
2012	(United States) Aaron Harper	Levski Sofia
2013	(Bulgaria) Emil Binev	Rilski Sportist
2014	(Bulgaria) Ivan Lilov	BC Balkan Botevgrad
2015	(Bulgaria) Ivan Lilov	BC Balkan Botevgrad
2016	(Bulgaria) Plamen Aleksiev	BC Beroe
2017	(Bulgaria) Konstantin Koev	Spartak Pleven
2018	(Bulgaria) Konstantin Koev	Spartak Pleven
2019	(Bulgaria) Aleksandar Gruev	Academic Plovdiv
2025	(Bulgaria) Vasil Popov	Minyor 2015

== Slam-Dunk Contest ==
Year	Winner	Team
2004	(Bulgaria) Dimitar Horozov	BC Yambol
2005	(United States) Carlos Morban	CSKA Sofia
2006	(United States) Christopher Moore	CSKA Sofia
2007	(United States) Donta Smith	Lukoil Academic Sofia
2008	(Bulgaria) Vladimir Nikolov	Dunav Ruse
2009	(Bulgaria) Vladimir Nikolov	Dunav Ruse
2010	(Bulgaria) Stanislav Tsonkov	BC Cherno More
2011	(United States) Donald Cole	BC Levski Sofia
2012	(United States) Andre Owens	Lukoil Academic Sofia
2013	(United States) Michael Hart	BC Beroe
2014	(United States) Vernon Taylor	Rilski Sportist
2015	(Bulgaria) Pavel Marinov & (United States) Lenny Daniel (shared)	BC Balkan Botevgrad; Cherno More Port Varna
2016	(Bulgaria) Andrey Ivanov	BC Yambol
2017	(United States) D.J. Shelton	Rilski Sportist
2018	(United States) DeVaughn Washington	BC Balkan Botevgrad
2019	(Bulgaria) Martin Yordanov	BC Cherno More
2025	(United States) Curtis Jones	BC Balkan Botevgrad

== Skills Challenge ==
Year	Winner	Team
2012	(Bulgaria) Stanislav Govedarov	BC Yambol
2013	(Sweden) Thomas Massamba	Lukoil Academic Sofia
2014	(United States) Sean Barnette	Rilski Sportist
2015	(United States) Dee Brown	Lukoil Academic Sofia
2016	(Bulgaria) Yordan Minchev	BC Levski Sofia
2017	(United States) Danny Gibson	Lukoil Academic Sofia
2018	(Bulgaria) Hristo Zahariev	BC Balkan Botevgrad
2019	(United States) Patrick Rembert	BC Levski Sofia
2025	(United States) Kenny Dye	BC Beroe

== Rodman and Muggsy Bogues in the All-Star Game ==
In 2012 the Bulgarian Basketball Federation presided by Georgi Glouchkov invited former NBA superstar Dennis Rodman to attend the 2012 All-Star Game as a special guest. Rodman arrived in Sofia and in a press conference he even expressed his desire to play in the event. Though he attended the event he finally did not play. Two years earlier Muggsy Bogues was invited by the Federation to attend the 2010 All-Star Game in Varna. He received a copy of a jersey worn by Georgi Glouchkov in the first 1990 edition at the press conference. Bogues started the match by throwing the first ball, and was a member of the jury evaluating the performances in the dunking competition.
