= Stephen Zack =

American basketball player (born 1992)

Free agent
- Position: Center

Personal information
- Born: December 10, 1992 (age 33) New Cumberland, Pennsylvania, U.S.
- Listed height: 6 ft 11.75 in (2.13 m)
- Listed weight: 244.2 lb (111 kg)

Career information
- High school: Red Land (Lewisberry, Pennsylvania)
- College: La Salle (2011–2015)
- NBA draft: 2015: undrafted
- Playing career: 2015–present

Career history
- 2015–2016: Liepājas Lauvas
- 2016–2017: Lukoil Academic
- 2017–2018: Trefl Sopot
- 2018–2019: VEF Rīga
- 2019–2020: Hapoel Be'er Sheva
- 2020–2021: Petkim Spor
- 2021: San Pablo Burgos
- 2021–2022: Hapoel Holon
- 2022–2024: Akita Northern Happinets
- 2024–2025: Nagasaki Velca
- 2025: Alvark Tokyo

Career highlights
- Israeli League champion (2022); Top Rebounder in the Israel Basketball Premier League (2020); Latvian League champion (2019); Bulgarian League champion (2017); Atlantic 10 All-Defensive Team (2014)

Stephen George "Steve" Zack (born December 10, 1992) is an American professional basketball player for Alvark Tokyo of the B.League. Zack played college basketball for La Salle University, before playing professionally in Latvia, Bulgaria, Poland, and Israel. In 2019–20 he was the top rebounder in the Israel Basketball Premier League.

== Early life and college career ==
Zack attended Red Land High School in Lewisberry, Pennsylvania, where he averaged a double-double 15 points and 10 rebounds in his senior year. He was named a two-time Patriot News All-Big 15 team selection as he led his team to the District finals and elite eight of state tournament.

Zack played four years of college basketball at La Salle University, where he finished his career as La Salle second all-time in blocked shots (169), sixth in games played (123) and seventh in rebounding (843). Zack led his team and was fourth in the Atlantic 10 in rebounding, while also averaging 8.6 points and 1.8 blocks per game in his senior year. On March 11, 2014, Zack earned a spot in the Atlantic 10 All-Defensive Team.

== Professional career ==
After going undrafted in the 2015 NBA draft, Zack joined the Philadelphia 76ers for the 2015 NBA Summer League, where he averaged 5.7 points and 5.2 rebounds in four games played for the Sixers.

On August 14, 2015, Zack signed with Liepājas Lauvas of the Latvian LBL. In 12 Baltic League games played for Liepājas Lauvas, he finished the season as the league best rebounder with 11.0 rebounds per game, while also averaging 12.2 points.

On July 29, 2016, Zack signed with PBC Lukoil Academic of the Bulgarian NBL. On January 12, 2017, Zack was named FIBA Europe Cup Top Performer of the week, after recording 20 points and 15 rebounds for a PIR of 35, in an away win against Benfica. Zack went on to win the 2017 Bulgarian League championship title with Lukoil Academic.

On August 11, 2017, Zack signed a one-year deal with Trefl Sopot of the Polish Basketball League (PLK). In 30 games played for Trefl Sopot, he averaged 12 points, 8.1 rebounds and 2.1 assists per game.

On July 30, 2018, Zack signed with VEF Rīga of the Latvian Basketball League and the VTB United League. On March 3, 2019, Zack recorded double-double 11 rebounds with a career-high 25 points, in a 92–78 win over Zielona Góra. In 56 games played during the 2018–19 season, he averaged 11.7 points and 7.4 rebounds per game, while shooting 57.7 percent from the field.

On August 4, 2019, Zack signed a two-year deal with Hapoel Be'er Sheva of the Israeli Premier League. On January 17, 2020, Zack recorded a career-high 21 rebounds, along with 15 points and four assists in a 103–76 blowout win over Hapoel Tel Aviv. In 2019–20 he was the top rebounder in the Israel Basketball Premier League.

On July 24, 2020, he has signed with Petkim Spor of the Turkish Basketball Super League.

On July 21, 2021, he has signed with San Pablo Burgos of the Liga ACB. He averaged 4.2 points and 4.1 rebounds per game.

On November 27, 2021, Zack signed with Hapoel Holon of the Israeli Basketball Premier League.

On September 30, 2022, Zack signed with Akita Northern Happinets of the B.League. On June 15, 2023, he re-signed with Akita Northern Happinets. On November 1, 2024, he signed with Nagasaki Velca of the B.League. On February 20, 2025, his contract was terminated. On February 28, he signed with Alvark Tokyo of the B.League.
