= 2011 Bulgarian presidential election =

- 23 October 2011 (first round); 30 October 2011 (second round)
- Turnout: 52.29% (first round), 48.25% (second round)
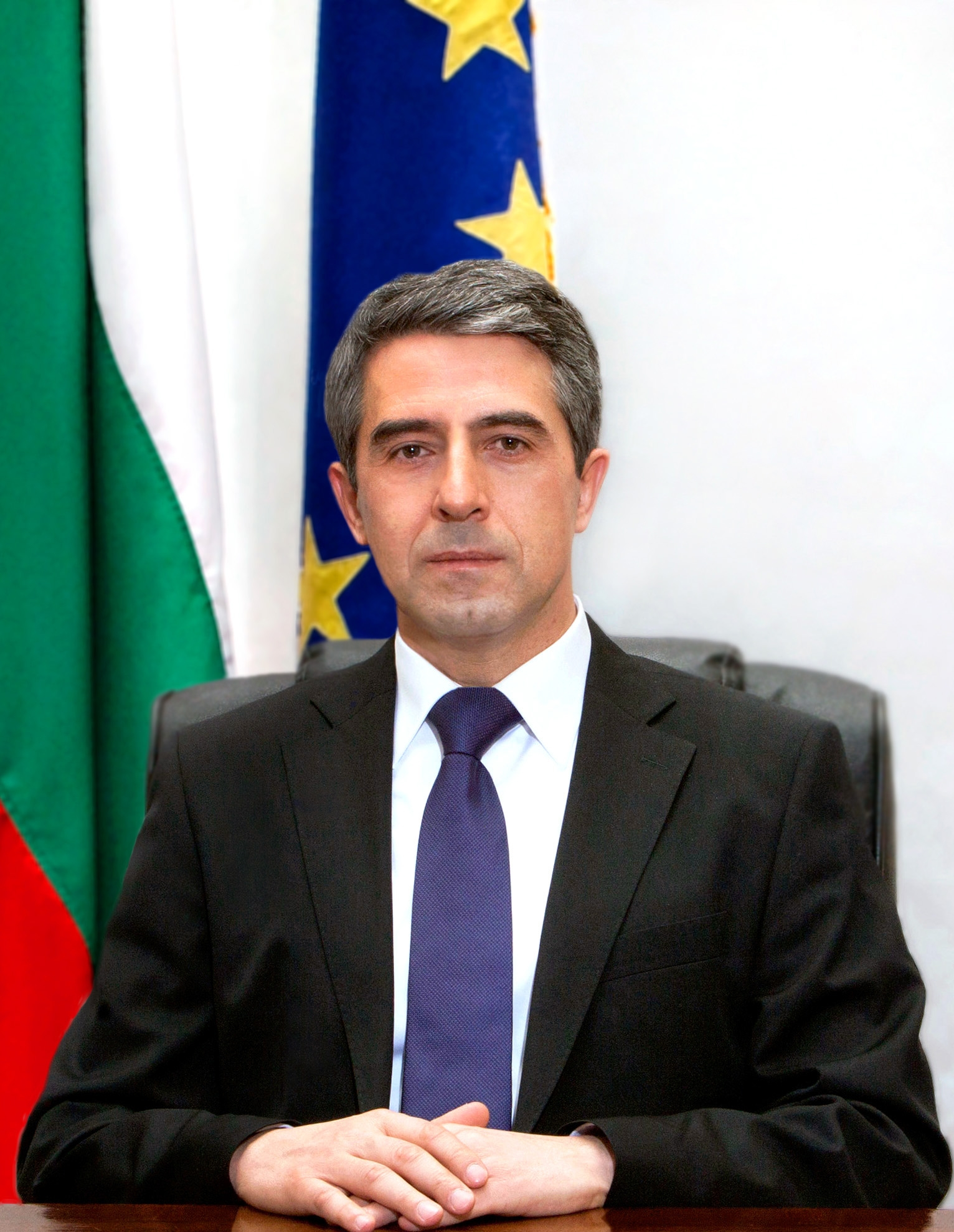

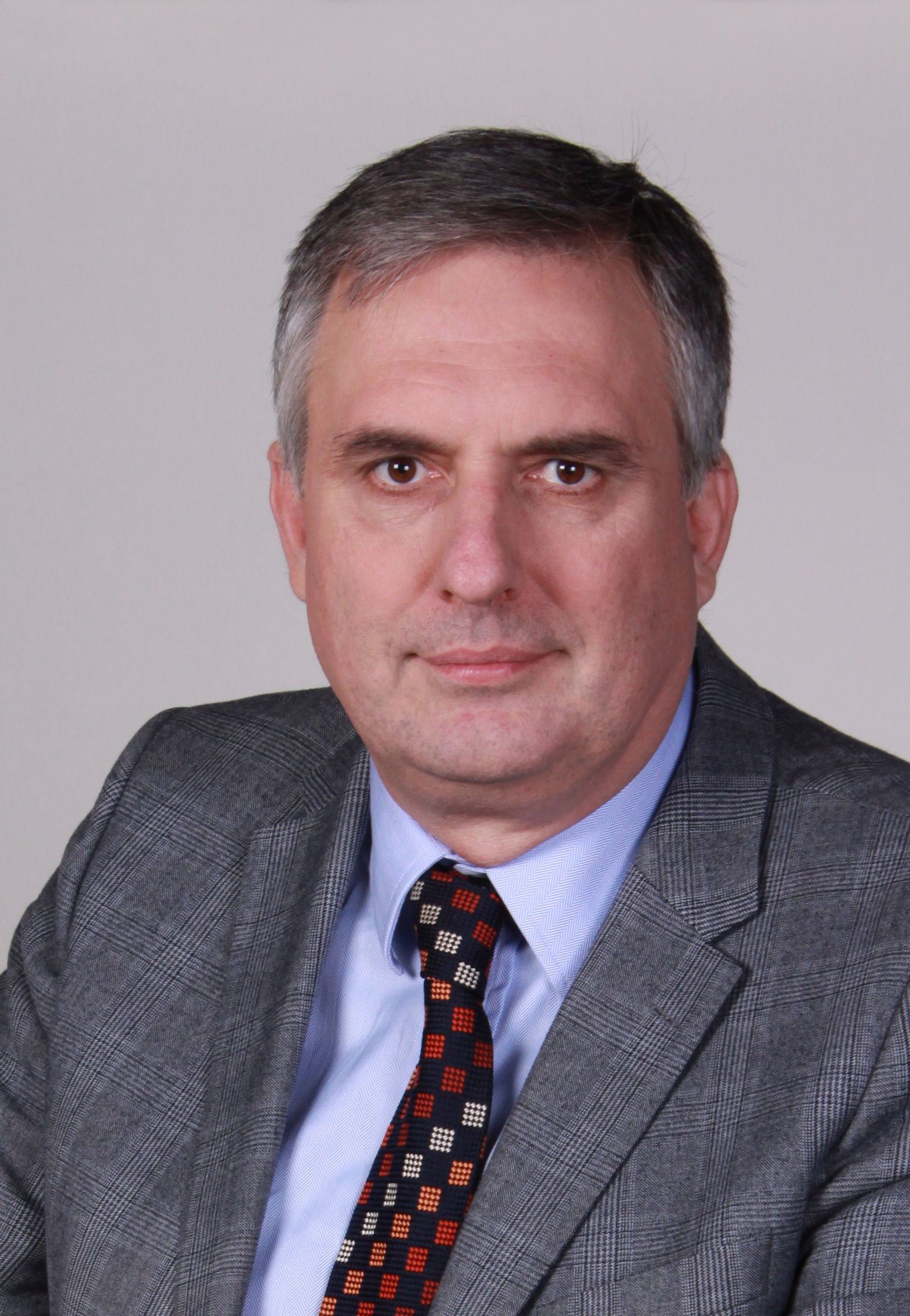
Nominee	Rosen Plevneliev	Ivailo Kalfin
Party	GERB	BSP
Running mate	Margarita Popova	Stefan Danailov
Popular vote	1,698,136	1,531,193
Percentage	52.58%	47.42%

Plevneliev
20-30%
30-40%
40-50%
50-60%
60-70%
70-80%
Kalfin
20-30%
30-40%
40-50%
50-60%
60-70%
70-80%
80-90%
Tie
President before election
Georgi Parvanov
BSP
Elected President
Rosen Plevneliev
GERB

Presidential elections were held in Bulgaria on 23 October 2011, with a runoff held on 30 October 2011. Incumbent president Georgi Parvanov was not eligible for re-election; the Constitution of Bulgaria limits a president to two terms. No candidate won outright in the first round, resulting in a runoff between the eventual winner, Rosen Plevneliev of GERB, and Ivaylo Kalfin of the Bulgarian Socialist Party.

== Background ==
The presidential elections were held in conjunction with local elections, saving the country BGN 8 million according to the finance minister Simeon Djankov. However, the move drew criticism from the US Ambassador in Sofia, James Warlick, who said that the move led to poor administration during the elections.

== Candidates ==
There were 18 registered candidates. Rosen Plevneliev, Ivaylo Kalfin, and Meglena Kuneva were expected to have the best chance of reaching the second round. The candidates are:

Party	Presidential candidate	Vice presidential candidate
Blue Coalition	Rumen Hristov	Emmanuel Yordanov
Bulgarian Agrarian National Union	Nikolay Nenchev	Zheko Ivanov
Bulgarian Democratic Unity	Andrey Chorbanov	Angel Mirchev
Bulgarian Socialist Party	Ivaylo Kalfin	Former Culture Minister Stefan Danailov
GERB	Rosen Plevneliev	Justice Minister Margarita Popova
IMRO – Bulgarian National Movement	Krasimir Karakachanov	Daniela Dimitrova
Initiative committee	Meglena Kuneva	Lyubomir Hristov
Initiative committee	Dimitar Kutsarov	Kamelia Todorova
Initiative committee	Aleksei Petrov	Nikolai Georgiev
Initiative committee	Nikolay Vassilev	Vladimir Savov
Initiative committee	Svetoslav Vitkov	Ventsislav Mitsov
Initiative committee	Ventsislav Yosifov	Vladimir Slavov
National Front for Salvation of Bulgaria	Stefan Solakov	Galina Vasileva
National Movement Unity	Sali Ibrayim	Valentina Gotseva
Attack	Volen Siderov	Pavel Shopov
Order, Law and Justice	Atanas Semov	Polya Stancheva
Party for the People of the Nation	Pavel Chernev	Anelia Dimitrova
United People's Party	Maria Kapon	Nikolay Kisyov

== Opinion polls ==
=== First round ===
Qualifying for the second round

Pollster	Date	Plevneliev	Kalfin	Kuneva	Siderov	Hristov	Semov	Karakachanov	Vitkov	Others
Alpha Rissourch	20.09.2011	22.9	14	11.1	2.4	2.4	1.5	1.3	0.6	43.8
TSAM	12.10.2016	30.8	16.1	9.8	2.3	3.1	0.3	1.5	0	36.1
Alpha Rissorch	21.10.2011	21.5	16.4	9.5	3.8	2.2	0.9	0.7	0	45

== Conduct ==
=== MPs interfering with the ballot count ===
Two GERB MPs were photographed at the Sofia electoral commission amid the chaos that erupted at the Sofia commission right after the first round of presidential and local elections. These two MPs were not authorized to be present at the electoral commission at that time: an offence under Bulgarian law. One of the GERB MPs, Stanislav Ivanov, was photographed carrying a large bag around the Sofia Electoral Commission building. This bag was presumably full of ballots. The Central Electoral Commission held a meeting on the case but failed to reach a decision, because voting could not reach the required 2/3 majority.

=== Universiada Hall crisis ===
Members of electoral committees were held without rest or sleep for 30 to 34 hours. Universiada Hall was not aired, was stunningly cold and members of committees were not given food and water, and not allowed to go outside the Hall to buy such. Journalists and observers were not allowed in Universiada Hall and a large region around it was slipped off with police until the next day late afternoon and early evening.

In the day of the elections and day after one member of Municipal Committee in Varna died, six ambulances arrived at Universiada Hall to assist fainted committee members, while the number of fainted man and women, and those suffering health problems during and after elections is not known, according to witnesses people were fainting in the Hall and at the queues for delivering elections protocols, and in the first lines at the committee members meeting in Universiada people were in constant fainted and wakening cycles condition because of lack of air, cold, malnutrition and exhausture.

People slept on floor, on bags with bulletins and even some left Universiada Hall unlawfully with taking the bulletins with themselves at home because of the poor conditions.

In the first announcement of the situation no politician or Central Committee member expressed any sorry or apology for it and party GERB said that the reason of this was the one-hour delay of the starting of the electoral day but in fact the starting of the electoral day was marked by no voters in the first two hours, while people was arriving at sections to vote around 8 am.

After the scandal of the situation of people still at Universiada Hall sparked in media, it was announced that committee members held there will receive 60 lv or 30 Euro more as a compensation for the long hours stay.

=== International statements ===
The PACE delegation noted that whilst the election was conducted in a generally orderly and peaceful way, there remained concerns about a lack of an equal access to the media, blurred distinctions between newspaper editorials and political advertisements, the lack of a dedicated voter roll and the candidate registration system which particularly affected independent candidates. PACE also recommended that voting for expatriate Bulgarians should be improved. The OCSE delegation also noted concerns about the blurred lines in media coverage, as well as vote-buying allegations, restrictions on using minority languages in campaigns, and inflammatory statements by some candidates.

== Results ==
Candidate	Running mate	Party	First round		Second round	
Candidate	Running mate	Party	Votes	%	Votes	%
Rosen Plevneliev	Margarita Popova	GERB	1,349,380	40.11	1,698,136	52.58
Ivaylo Kalfin	Stefan Danailov	Bulgarian Socialist Party	974,300	28.96	1,531,193	47.42
Meglena Kuneva	Lyubomir Hristov	Initiative committee	470,808	14.00		
Volen Siderov	Pavel Shopov	Attack	122,466	3.64		
Stefan Solakov	Galina Vasileva	National Front for the Salvation of Bulgaria	84,205	2.50		
Rumen Hristov	Emmanuel Yordanov	Union of Democratic Forces	65,761	1.95		
Atanas Semov	Polya Stancheva	Order, Law and Justice	61,797	1.84		
Svetoslav Vitkov	Ventsislav Mitsov	Initiative committee	54,125	1.61		
Sali Ibrayim	Valentina Gotseva	National Movement Unity	41,837	1.24		
Krasimir Karakachanov	Daniela Dimitrova	IMRO – Bulgarian National Movement	33,236	0.99		
Aleksey Petrov	Nikolai Georgiev	Initiative committee	31,613	0.94		
Maria Kapon	Nikolay Kisyov	United People's Party	30,665	0.91		
Nikolay Nenchev	Zheko Ivanov	Bulgarian Agrarian National Union	9,827	0.29		
Pavel Chernev	Anelia Dimitrova	Party for the People of the Nation	8,081	0.24		
Ventsislav Yosifov	Vladimir Slavov	Initiative committee	7,021	0.21		
Dimitar Kutsarov	Kamelia Todorova	Initiative committee	6,989	0.21		
Andrey Chorbanov	Angel Mirchev	Bulgarian Democratic Unity	6,340	0.19		
Nikolay Vasilev	Vladimir Savov	Initiative committee	5,633	0.17		
Total			3,364,084	100.00	3,229,329	100.00
Valid votes			3,364,084	93.60	3,229,329	96.86
Invalid/blank votes			229,844	6.40	104,837	3.14
Total votes			3,593,928	100.00	3,334,166	100.00
Registered voters/turnout			6,873,589	52.29	6,910,491	48.25
Source: Electoral Commission of Bulgaria
