= Ivan Nikolov =

Ivan Nikolov may refer to:

- Ivan Nikolov (basketball), Bulgarian basketball player
- Ivan Nikolov (footballer), Macedonian footballer
- Ivan Kostov Nikolov, Bulgarian geologist, mineralogist and crystallographer
