= Gruev =

Gruev (Bulgarian: Груев) is a Bulgarian masculine surname, its feminine counterpart is Grueva. Notable people with the surname include:

- Aleksandar Gruev (born 1983), Bulgarian basketball player
- Dame Gruev (1871–1906), Bulgarian teacher
  - Gruev Cove in Antarctica, named after Dame Gruev
- Iliya Gruev (born 1969), Bulgarian footballer
- Ilia Gruev (footballer, born 2000), Bulgarian footballer
- Vasil Gruev (born 1926), Bulgarian cross country skier
- Yoakim Gruev (died 1912), Bulgarian teacher and translator
