= Georgi Khristov =

Georgi Khristov may refer to:

- Georgi Khristov (basketball)
- Georgi Khristov (gymnast)
