= Stefan Stoykov =

Stefan Stoykov can refer to:

- Stefan Stoykov (basketball) (1938–2013), Bulgarian basketball player
- Stefan Stoykov (javelin thrower), born 1951, Bulgarian athlete
- Stefan Stoykov (rowing), born 1953, Bulgarian rowing coxswain
