= Pavel Chernev =

Bulgarian politician and lawyer

Personal details
- Born: 10 July 1969 Sofia, Bulgaria
- Died: 19 March 2016 (aged 46) Sofia, Bulgaria
- Profession: Lawyer, politician

Pavel Mihaylov Chernev (Bulgarian: Павел Михайлов Чернев) (10 July 1969 – 19 March 2016) was a Bulgarian politician and lawyer. He was also one of the MPs who opposed the Independence of Kosovo.

== Biography ==
Born in Sofia, Chernev graduated from the juridical faculty of Sofia University and was a practicing attorney. In his younger years, he focused on a number of sports such as wrestling and karate, which also taking up security-related jobs. In the summer of 1990, Chernev was a participant in the student pro-democracy protests and occupations.

Chernev was formerly a member of the nationalist political party Ataka ("Attack") and was widely regarded as Volen Siderov's right-hand man. During his time with Ataka, Chernev was among the members who played a role in steering the party away from radical nationalists and activists with admiration for Neo-Nazi ideas. Chernev parted ways with the party in 2006 following the development of a conflict of interest with the party leader in the aftermath of his and Siderov's controversial involvement in a traffic dispute with another driver.

He took part in the October 2007 Sofia municipal elections and finished in 10th place out of 41 candidates.

In 2010, Chernev appeared in the Bulgarian comedy film Mission London together with Yulian Vergov, a childhood friend. In his capacity as an actor, he was usually typecast in tough guy or villainous roles.

In 2011, he was a candidate to become President of Bulgaria as a member of the Party for the People of the Nation (Bulgarian: Партия за Хората от Народа), receiving 0.24% of the votes cast. He was also the leader of the Bulgarian section of Stop Islamisation of Europe (SIOE), and held speeches at international counter-jihad conferences.

In 2013, Chernev participated in the Bulgarian version of the reality TV show VIP Brother.

Chernev is opposed to the membership of Bulgaria in the European Union and has called for the holding of a referendum on the matter. His views have been characterized by political scientists such as Ognyan Minchev as uncompromisingly pro-Russian.

During the annexation of Crimea by the Russian Federation, Chernev was one of the Orthodox Dawn (Bulgarian: Православна Зора, Pravoslavna Zora) members who helped recruit and organize a small number of Bulgarian volunteers who travelled to Crimea in order to support the Russian operations. He also served as an election observer for the 2014 referendum in Crimea.

In August 2014, Chernev was admitted as a member of the newly formed Patriotic Front, with his Freedom Party (Bulgarian: партия "Свобода", partiya "Svoboda") also becoming part of the electoral alliance. However, the Freedom Party withdrew its support for the Patriotic Front in May 2015.

On the 19 March 2016, Pavel died after a pulmonary embolism in Sofia, Bulgaria.
