= Slavko Stefanović =

Serbian basketball player

Personal information
- Born: March 28, 1981 (age 45) Titovo Užice, SR Serbia, SFR Yugoslavia
- Listed height: 2.06 m (6 ft 9 in)
- Listed weight: 98 kg (216 lb)

Career information
- NBA draft: 2003: undrafted
- Playing career: 2000–2013
- Position: Power forward

Career history
- 2000–2002: Beopetrol
- 2002–2004: Lavovi 063
- 2004–2005: Crvena zvezda
- 2005–2006: Hemofarm
- 2007: Mega Aqua Monta
- 2008: Alba Berlin
- 2008: Mega Aqua Monta
- 2008: Igokea
- 2008–2009: Universitet Yugra Surgut
- 2009: OKK Beograd
- 2010: Lukoil Academic
- 2010: OKK Beograd
- 2010–2011: Keravnos
- 2011–2012: OKK Beograd
- 2012–2013: Sloboda Užice

Career highlights
- Bulgarian League champion (2010)

Slavko Stefanović (born March 28, 1981) is a Serbian former professional basketball player. He played the power forward position.

== Professional career ==
Stefanović began his professional career with Belgrade clubs Beopetrol and Lavovi 063. In November 2004, he signed with Crvena zvezda. He stayed with Zvezda till the end of the season. For the next season he signed with Hemofarm. In the 2006–07 season he did not play because of injury.

Next season he starts with Mega Aqua Monta, but left them in December 2007 and signed with Alba Berlin. He left them in February 2008 and returned to Mega Aqua Monta. In March 2008 he signed with Igokea until the end of the season.

The following season he spent with Universitet Yugra Surgut. He then signed with OKK Beograd but left them during the season and signed with Lukoil Academic. Following season he again started with OKK Beograd, but left them after only two games and signed with Keravnos where he spent rest of the season.

The 2011–12 season he spent with OKK Beograd. For the 2012–13 season he returned to his hometown Užice and signed with KK Sloboda Užice. In March 2013 he got injured and finish his career.
