= Rumen Hristov (politician) =

Bulgarian politician

- Румен Христов
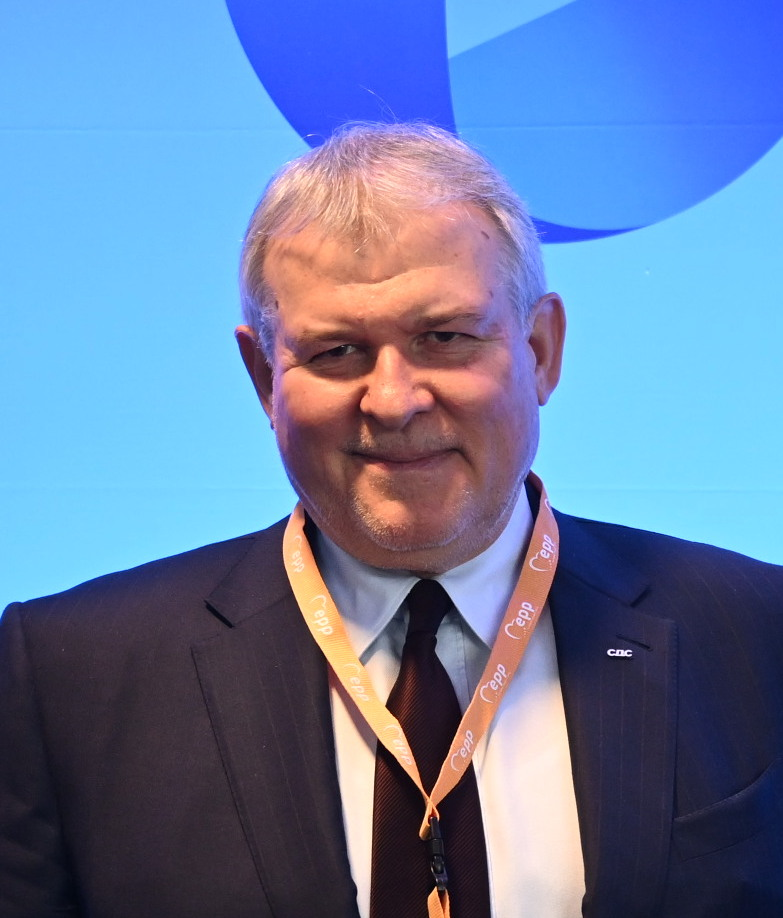
- Hristov in 2022

Personal details
- Born: 27 December 1955 (age 70) Borovo, Bulgaria
- Party: SDS (since 1989)
- Other political affiliations: ODS (1996–2009); Blue Coalition (2009–2013); Reformist Bloc (since 2013)

Rumen Dimitrov Hristov (Bulgarian: Румен Димитров Христов; born 27 December 1955) is a Bulgarian politician from the Union of Democratic Forces (SDS).

== Early life ==
He graduated in Agrarian Economics and then defended his doctoral dissertation. Later he was an extraordinary professor at the South-West University in Blagoevgrad. He teaches the basics of marketing and agromarketing.

In the period 1991–1994 he was Deputy Minister of Agriculture. He was an adviser to President Zhelyu Zhelev on agrarian issues. He was twice Minister of Agriculture – in the caretaker governments of Reneta Indzhova (1994–1995) and Stefan Sofiyanski (1997). From 1997 to 2002 he was Chief Administrative Secretary in the Administration of the President of the Republic of Bulgaria Petar Stoyanov.

== Career ==
Later, he was a professor at Southwestern University in Blagoevgrad, Bulgaria. He teaches the basics of marketing and agromarketing.

In the period 1991–1994, he was the Deputy Minister of Agriculture. He was an adviser to President Zhelyu Zhelev on agrarian issues. Twice minister of agriculture - in the caretaker government of Reneta Indzhova (1994–1995) and Stefan Sofiyanski (1997). From 1997 to 2002 was chief administrative secretary in the administration of the President of Bulgaria Petar Stoyanov.

The 2011 Bulgarian presidential election was a candidate for president of the Blue Coalition. He lost in the first round, taking 6th place among 21 candidates with less than 2% of the vote In 2014, he was elected as a member of the National Assembly of the 43rd term on behalf of the Reform Bloc

In December 2016, the Reformist Bloc was commissioned to attempt to form a government, with Hristov speaking hopefully to the media.

In 2018, he replaced Bozidar Łukarski as chairman of the then non-parliamentary Union of Democratic Forces In April 2021, July 2021, November 2021, October 2022, April 2023, June 2024 and October 2024, as a candidate of the GERB-SDS coalition, he won the seat of the 45th, 46th, 47th, 48th, 49th, 50th and 51st terms of the Bulgarian Parliament.
