= Viktor Radev =

Bulgarian basketball player

Personal information
- Born: 19 November 1936 Maritsa Municipality, Kingdom of Bulgaria
- Died: 31 August 2014 (aged 77)
- Listed height: 1.96 m (6 ft 5 in)
- Listed weight: 100 kg (220 lb)

Career information
- Playing career: 1955–1970
- Position: Power forward

Career history
- Academic Sofia
- Lokomotiv Sofia
- Slavia Sofia

Career highlights
- 1× EuroLeague Top Scorer (1958)
Medals
Representing the Bulgaria
EuroBasket
Silver medal – second place	1957 Bulgaria
Bronze medal – third place	1961 Yugoslavia

Viktor Bonev Radev (Bulgarian: Виктор Бонев Радев) (19 November 1936 – 31 August 2014) was a Bulgarian basketball player. He was born in Maritsa Municipality, Bulgaria. He was a 1.96 m (6 ft 5 in) tall forward.

== Club career ==
Radev reached two consecutive EuroLeague Finals with Akademik Sofia, in 1958 and 1959. He was the leading scorer of the inaugural 1958 EuroLeague season with 251 points in 10 games. In total, Radev played 5 seasons in EuroLeague, three with Akademik and two with Lokomotiv team.

On national level, Radev won 5 Bulgarian league titles and one Bulgarian Cup trophy. He also won four silver and two bronze medals in Bulgarian league.

== Bulgarian national team ==
As a member of the senior men's Bulgarian national team, he won the silver medal at the EuroBasket 1957 and the bronze medal at the EuroBasket 1961. He also competed in the men's tournament at the 1956 Summer Olympics and 1960 Summer Olympics.
