= Red Land High School =

Public school in Pennsylvania, United States

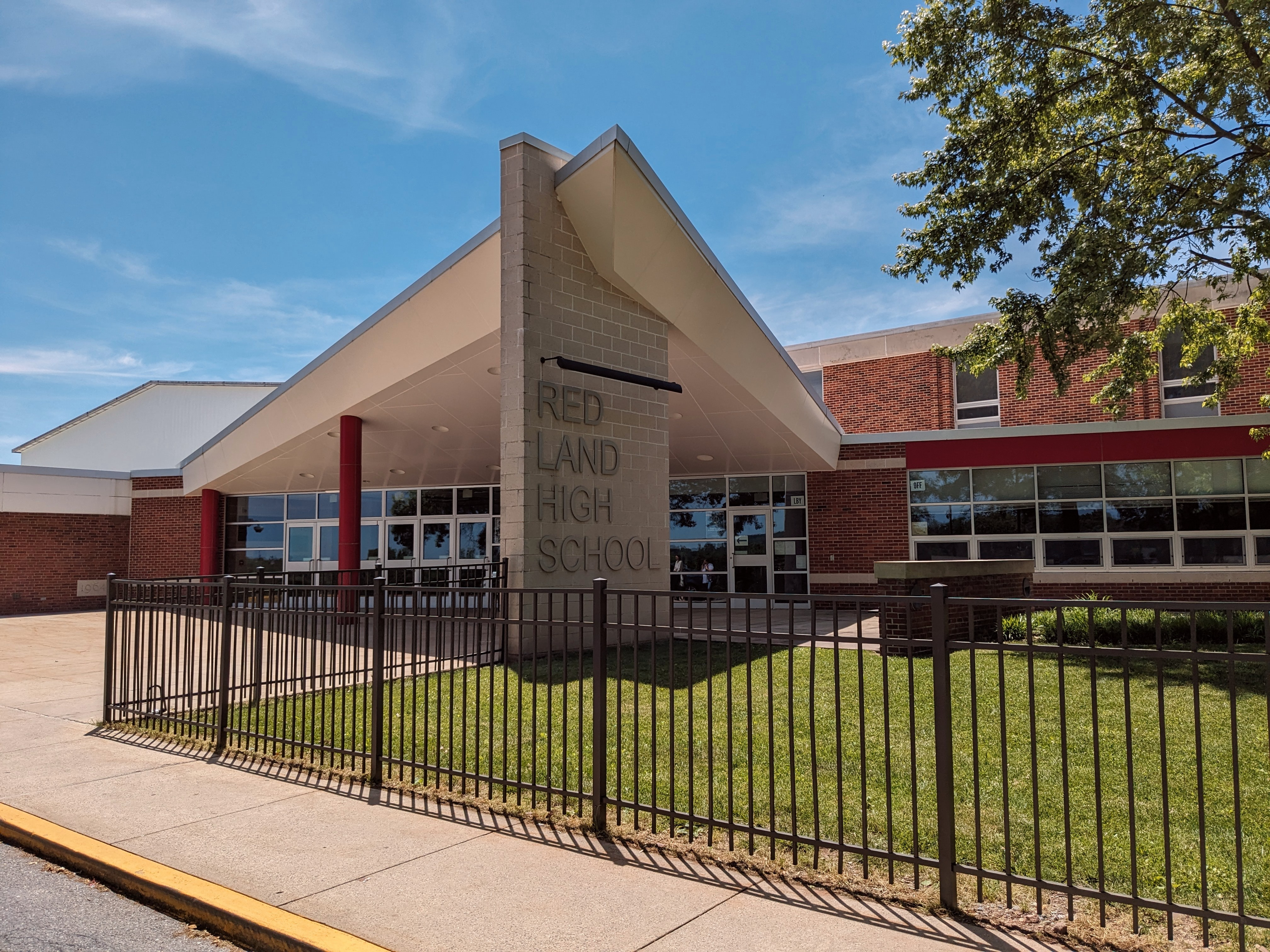

Location
- 560 Fishing Creek Rd; Lewisberry, York County, Pennsylvania 17339; United States

Information
- Other names: Red Land Senior High School
- School type: Public High School
- Established: 1964
- Status: Open
- School district: West Shore School District
- NCES District ID: 4225830
- School number: (717) 938-6561
- NCES School ID: 422583004704
- Principal: Melissa Herbert
- Teaching staff: 68.09 (FTE)
- Grades: 9-12
- Enrollment: 1,061 (2024–2025)
- Student to teacher ratio: 15.58
- Colors: Navy and red
- Athletics: Pennsylvania Interscholastic Athletic Association
- Mascot: Patriots
- Team name: Red Land Patriots
- Website: www.wssd.k12.pa.us/RedLand.aspx

Red Land High School is located in Lewisberry, York County, Pennsylvania, United States, and is younger of the two high schools in the West Shore School District. The entire West Shore School District attended Cedar Cliff High School until fall 1965, when Red Land High School opened. As of 2021, the school had 1,107 students enrolled. In 2019, the school had 70 teachers yielding a student teach ratio of about 16:1.

== Demographics ==
The demographic breakdown of the 1,107 students enrolled for 2024-2025 was:

=== Enrollment by grade ===
- 9th - 297
- 10th - 287
- 11th - 254
- 12th - 269

=== Enrollment by Race/Ethnicity ===
- Native American/Alaskan - 1
- Asian - 12
- Black - 18
- Hispanic - 72
- White - 921
- Multiracial - 37

=== Enrollment by Gender ===
- Male - 554
- Female - 507

284 students are eligible for free lunch and 19 for reduced-price lunch. For 2019–2020, Red Land was not a Title 1 school.

Note: Details may not add to totals.

== Academic achievement ==
2014 School Performance Profile

Red Land Senior High School achieved 87.4 out of 100. Reflects on grade level reading, mathematics and science achievement. In reading/literature – 80% were on grade level. In Algebra 1, 68.7% showed on grade level skills. In Biology, just 63% demonstrated on grade level science understanding at the end of the course.

2013 School Performance Profile

Red Land Senior High School achieved 88.7 out of 100. Reflects on grade level reading, mathematics and science achievement. In reading/literature – 85% were on grade level. In Algebra 1, 63% showed on grade level skills. In Biology, just 44% showed on grade level science understanding.

AYP History

In 2012, Red Land Senior High School declined further to Corrective Action I AYP status under No Child Left Behind. In 2011, the Red Land Senior High School was in Making Progress: in School Improvement II status. In 2010, the school declined to School Improvement II status due to continued poor student achievement. In 2009, Red Land Senior High School was in Making Progress: in School Improvement I due to chronic, low student achievement. In 2008, Red Land Senior High School was in School Improvement I status due to chronic low student achievement.

Red Land Senior High School Graduation Rate:

- 2014 – 92.9%
- 2012 – 90%
- 2011 – 90%
- 2010 – 94%
- 2009 – 95%
- 2008 – 90%

PSSA Results

11th Grade Reading

- 2012 – 68% on grade level (16% below basic). State – 67%
- 2011 – 78%, (9% below basic). State – 69.1%
- 2010 – 73%, State – 67%
- 2009 – 69%, State – 65%
- 2008 – 57%, State – 65%
- 2007 – 57%, State – 65%

11th Grade Math

- 2012 – 60% on grade level (26% below basic). State – 59%
- 2011 – 65%, (17% below basic). State – 60.3%
- 2010 – 54%, State – 59%
- 2009 – 56%, State – 55%
- 2008 – 49%, State – 56%
- 2007 – 45%, State – 53%

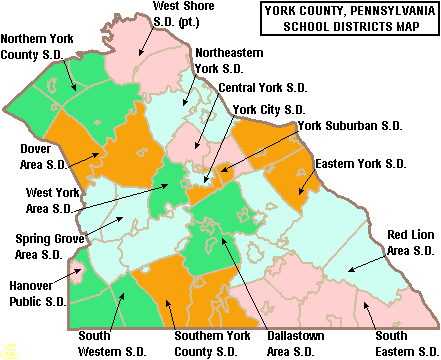
West Shore School District region in York County

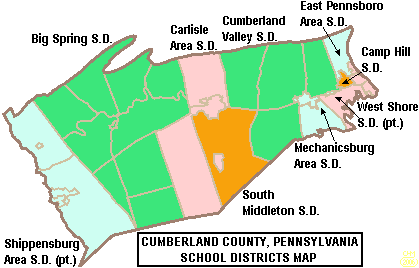
West Shore School District region in Cumberland County

11th Grade Science:

- 2012 – 44% on grade level (12% below basic). State – 42% of 11th graders were on grade level.
- 2011 – 44%, (12% below basic). State – 40%
- 2010 – 39%, State – 39%
- 2009 – 41%, State – 40%
- 2008 – 32%, State – 39%

=== SAT scores ===
In 2013, School District students took the SAT exams. The District's Verbal Average Score was . The Math average score was . The Writing average score was . The College Board reported that statewide scores were: 494 in reading, 504 in math and 482 in writing. The nationwide SAT results were the same as in 2012.

In 2012, 198 Red Land Senior High School students took the SAT exams. The School's Verbal Average Score was 509. The Math average score was 515. The Writing average score was 492. The statewide Verbal SAT exams results were: Verbal 491, Math 501, Writing 480. In the US, 1.65 million students took the exams achieving scores: Verbal 496, Math 514, Writing 488. According to the College Board the maximum score on each section was 800, and 360 students nationwide scored a perfect 2,400.

From January to June 2011, 186 Red Land Senior High School students took the SAT exams. The school's Verbal Average Score was 503. The Math average score was 501. The Writing average score was 477. Pennsylvania ranked 40th among states with SAT scores: Verbal – 493, Math – 501, Writing – 479. In the United States, 1.65 million students took the exam in 2011. They averaged 497 (out of 800) verbal, 514 math and 489 in writing.

== Notable alumni ==
- [[Rachel Apa]] Former [[Bucknell University]] Field Hockey player died November 1, 2026 while running in the New York City Marathon]].
- Mike Cox NFL fullback
- Steve Keim (born September 8, 1972) GM for Arizona Cardinals 2013 - 2022 National Football League
- Stephen Zack (born 1992), basketball player for Hapoel Holon in the Israeli Basketball Premier League
