= Bulgarian Basketball Federation =

Governing body of basketball in Bulgaria

- Sport: Basketball
- Founded: 1935
- President: Konstantin Papazov
- Country: Bulgaria
- Headquarters: Sofia
- Continent: FIBA Europe
- Website: basketball.bg

The Bulgarian Basketball Federation (Bulgarian: Българска федерация по баскетбол, romanized: Bǎlgarska federatsiya po basketbol) also known as (BFB) is the national governing body of basketball in Bulgaria. They organize national competitions in Bulgaria for the Bulgaria men's national basketball team, and Bulgaria women's national basketball team.

The top level professional league is the National Basketball League.

== Divisions ==
Men's

- Bulgaria national basketball team
- Bulgaria national 3x3 team

Women's

- Bulgaria women's national basketball team
- Bulgaria women's national 3x3 team

== Competitions ==
Bǎlgarska Federatsiya po Basketbol is responsible for organising the following competitions:

=== Men's basketball ===
- Bulgarian National Basketball League (Tier 1)

=== Women's basketball ===
- Bulgarian Women's Basketball Championship (Tier 1)

=== Cups ===
- Bulgarian Basketball Cup – Men
- Bulgarian Women's Basketball Cup – Women

== See also ==
- Bulgaria basketball league system
- Bulgarian Basketball All-Star Game
