= Petko Marinov =

Bulgarian basketball player and manager

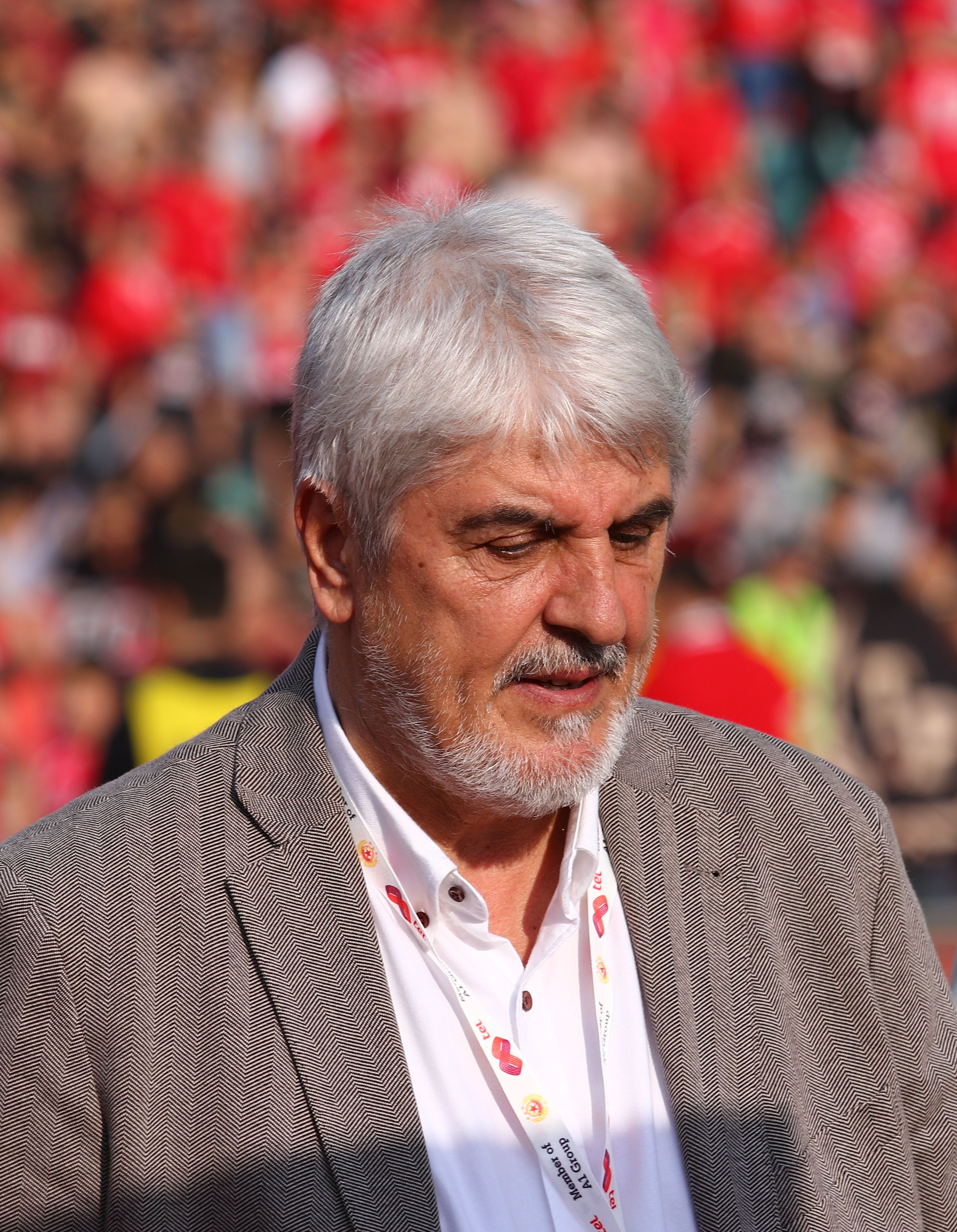
Petko Marinov in 2018.

Petko Marinov (Bulgarian Cyrillic: Петко Маринов) (born on 11 June 1949 in Bourgas) is a former Bulgarian basketball player and current basketball manager.

== Career ==
He started his career with Botev (Burgas) and then played for Akademik Sofia. With CSKA Sofia, he won two national championships and five Bulgarian Cups. For the national team, he appeared in 150 matches. Following his retirement from the game, he established himself as one of the most highly regarded basketball coaches in Bulgaria, leading BC CSKA Sofia to three national titles and four Bulgarian Cups. Marinov additionally managed Lukoil Akademik, becoming national champion (once) and cup holder (two times). Among his other distinctions is a Bulgarian Cup as manager of Compact Dimitrovgrad. Marinov has also been the coach of the women's basketball team Lukoil Neftohimik as well as in France. Furthermore, Marinov had two spells in charge of his country's national side.
