= Mike Cox (fullback) =

American football player (born 1985)

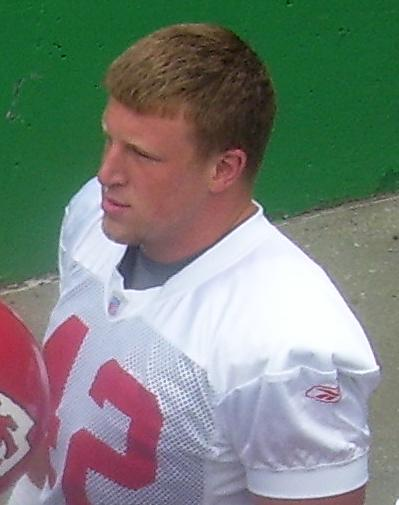
- Cox at a Chiefs mini camp practice in 2008

No. 42
- Position: Fullback

Personal information
- Born: July 11, 1985 (age 41); Woodbury, New Jersey, U.S.
- Listed height: 6 ft 0 in (1.83 m)
- Listed weight: 252 lb (114 kg)

Career information
- High school: Lewisberry (PA) Red Land
- College: Georgia Tech
- NFL draft: 2008: undrafted

Career history
- Kansas City Chiefs (2008–2010); Atlanta Falcons (2011–2012)

Career NFL statistics
- Rushing attempts: 4
- Rushing yards: 3
- Rushing touchdowns: 1
- Receptions: 27
- Receiving yards: 155
- Stats at Pro Football Reference

Michael Lawrence Cox (born July 11, 1985) is an American former professional football player who was a fullback in the National Football League (NFL). He played college football for the Georgia Tech Yellow Jackets. He was undrafted in the 2008 NFL draft, but signed as a free agent with the Kansas City Chiefs. Cox graduated from Red Land High School in 2004.

== Professional career ==
Undrafted in 2008, he began as the starting fullback in Week 1 against the New England Patriots and garnered two receptions. Cox later paved the way on the Chiefs, helping Jamaal Charles rush for 1,000 yards in 2009. He scored his only NFL touchdown in the season finale against the Denver Broncos. The next year Cox was an impetus for the Chiefs to lead the NFL in rushing. Kansas went 10-6 and won the AFC West, but lost in the Wild Card round to the Baltimore Ravens.

Cox was then released by Chiefs and he signed with the Atlanta Falcons in 2011. He appeared in 9 games with the team before being cut in 2012 after the team signed Lousaka Polite. On November 7, 2012, Cox re-signed with the Falcons after the team released Polite. Cox was with the Falcons for the rest of 2012 through the playoffs, chiefly starting the NFC Championship Game in a close defeat to the San Francisco 49ers. It was also when Cox had his only carry as a Falcon, a 4-yard rush coming out from the Atlanta 1-yard line. He ended his career playing in 59 games with 27 receptions, 5 carries and one touchdown.
