= Khristo Doychinov =

Bulgarian basketball player (born 1944)

Personal information
- Nationality: Bulgarian
- Born: 19 January 1944 (age 81); Sofia, Bulgaria
- Died: June 2015

Sport
- Sport: Basketball

Khristo Doychinov (Bulgarian: Христо Дойчинов, born 19 January 1944) is a former Bulgarian basketball player. He competed in the men's tournament at the 1968 Summer Olympics.
