= Aleksandar Gruev =

Bulgarian basketball player

Personal information
- Born: July 24, 1983 (age 43) Sofia, Bulgaria
- Listed height: 6 ft 2 in (1.88 m)
- Listed weight: 172 lb (78 kg)

Career information
- NBA draft: 2005: undrafted
- Playing career: 2003–present
- Position: Shooting guard

Career history
- 2003–2011: BC Rilski Sportist
- 2011: BC Levski Sofia
- 2011: Melli Haffari Company Ahvaz Sports Club
- 2011–2012: KK Zlatorog Laško
- 2012: BC Dinamo Tbilisi
- 2012–2013: CSU Sibiu
- 2013–2014: BC Balkan Botevgrad
- 2014–2015: PBC Lukoil Academic
- 2015–2017: BC Spartak Pleven
- 2017: Bashkimi Prizren
- 2017-2020: Academic Bultex 99

Career highlights
- BIBL champion (2009); NBL champion (2015)

Aleksandar Gruev (Bulgarian: Александър Груев) (born July 24, 1983) is a retired Bulgarian professional basketball player.

== Professional career ==
During his career, Gruev has played in Romania, Georgia, Iran and Slovenia.

On 30 September 2014, Gruev signed with Bulgarian champions PBC Lukoil Academic.
