= Pando Pandov =

Bulgarian basketball player

Personal information
- Nationality: Bulgarian
- Born: 6 November 1946 (age 79) Plovdiv, Bulgaria

Sport
- Sport: Basketball

Achievements and titles
- Olympic finals: 1968 Summer Olympics

Pando Pandov (Bulgarian: Пандо Пандов; born 6 November 1946) is a former Bulgarian basketball player. He competed in the men's tournament at the 1968 Summer Olympics.
