= Georgi Kanev =

Bulgarian basketball player (1934–2012)

Personal information
- Nationality: Bulgarian
- Born: 6 May 1934; Kazanlak, Bulgaria
- Died: 19 December 2012 (aged 78)

Sport
- Sport: Basketball

Georgi Stanchev Kanev (Bulgarian: Георги Станчев Кънев; 6 May 1934 – 19 December 2012) was a Bulgarian basketball player. He competed in the men's tournament at the 1956 Summer Olympics, and the 1960 Summer Olympics.
