= Gencho Khristov =

Bulgarian basketball player

Personal information
- Nationality: Bulgarian
- Born: 1932 (age 93–94)

Sport
- Sport: Basketball

Gencho Rashkov Khristov (Bulgarian: Генчо Рашков Христов, born 1932) is a former Bulgarian basketball player. He competed in the men's tournament at the 1952 Summer Olympics.
