= Iliya Mirchev =

Bulgarian basketball player

Personal information
- Born: 1 February 1934 Sofia, Bulgaria
- Died: 5 August 2007 (aged 73)
- Listed height: 201 cm (6 ft 7 in)
- Listed weight: 100 kg (220 lb)

Iliya Georgiev Mirchev (Bulgarian: Илия Георгиев Мирчев, 1 February 1934 – 5 August 2007) was a Bulgarian basketball player. He competed in the men's tournament at the 1956 Summer Olympics and the 1960 Summer Olympics.
