= Emanuil Gyaurov =

Bulgarian basketball player (1934–2015)

Personal information
- Nationality: Bulgarian
- Born: 6 November 1934; Sofia, Bulgaria
- Died: 17 June 2015 (aged 80)

Sport
- Sport: Basketball

Emanuil Mihaylov Gyaurov (Bulgarian: Емануил Михайлов Гяуров; 6 November 1934 – 17 June 2015) was a Bulgarian basketball player. He competed in the men's tournament at the 1960 Summer Olympics.
