= Vasil Manchenko =

Bulgarian basketball player

Personal information
- Nationality: Bulgarian
- Born: 5 April 1931; Grenoble, France
- Died: 17 May 2010 (aged 79); Sofia, Bulgaria

Sport
- Sport: Basketball

Vasil Pavlov Manchenko (Bulgarian: Васил Павлов Манченко, 5 April 1931 – 17 May 2010) was a Bulgarian basketball player. He competed in the men's tournament at the 1952 Summer Olympics, and the 1956 Summer Olympics.
