= Valentin Spasov =

Bulgarian basketball player

Personal information
- Nationality: Bulgarian
- Born: 16 April 1946 (age 78); Sofia, Bulgaria

Sport
- Sport: Basketball

Valentin Spasov (Bulgarian: Валентин Спасов, born 16 April 1946) is a Bulgarian former basketball player. He competed in the men's tournament at the 1968 Summer Olympics.
