= Khristo Donchev (basketball) =

Bulgarian basketball player

Personal information
- Nationality: Bulgarian
- Born: 24 June 1932 (age 92)

Sport
- Sport: Basketball

Khristo Petrov Donchev (Bulgarian: Христо Петров Дончев, born 24 June 1932) is a former Bulgarian basketball player. He competed in the men's tournament at the 1952 Summer Olympics.
