= 2016–17 National Basketball League (Bulgaria) season =

NBL
- Games played: 108 (regular season); 25 (playoffs)
- Teams: 9
- TV partner: BNT

Regular season
- Season MVP: (United States) Jordan Semple

Finals
- Champions: Lukoil Academic (26th title)
- Runners-up: Beroe
- Third place: Rilski Sportist
- Fourth place: Cherno More Ticha
- Finals MVP: (United States) Danny Gibson

The 2016–17 National Basketball League (Bulgaria) season was the 76th season of the Bulgarian NBL. The season started on October 14, 2016, and ended on May 30, 2017.

== Teams ==
2016–17 Bulgarian National Basketball League club locations.

Chernomorets resigned from the league due to financial difficulties.

Club	Last season	Arena	Location	Capacity
Academic Bultex 99	9th	Stroitel Hall	Plovdiv	1,000
Balkan Botevgrad	2nd	Arena Botevgrad	Botevgrad	4,500
Beroe	3rd	Municipal Hall	Stara Zagora	1,000
Cherno More Ticha	5th	Hristo Borisov	Varna	1,000
Levski Sofia	7th	Universiada Hall	Sofia	4,000
Lukoil Academic	1st	Sports Complex Hall	Pravets	1,000
Rilski Sportist	4th	Arena Samokov	Samokov	2,500
Spartak Pleven	6th	Balkanstroy	Pleven	1,200
Yambol	8th	Diana	Yambol	3,000

== Regular season ==
=== League table ===
Pos	Team	Pld	W	L	PF	PA	PD	Pts	Qualification
1	Lukoil Academic	24	20	4	2108	1769	+339	44	Advance to playoffs
2	Academic Bultex 99	24	16	8	2028	2012	+16	40	Advance to playoffs
3	Beroe	24	15	9	1989	1825	+164	39	Advance to playoffs
4	Rilski Sportist	24	14	10	2030	1973	+57	38	Advance to playoffs
5	Balkan Botevgrad	24	14	10	1888	1795	+93	38	Advance to playoffs
6	Spartak Pleven	24	11	13	2010	2046	−36	35	Advance to playoffs
7	Cherno More Ticha	24	7	17	1827	1992	−165	31	Advance to playoffs
8	Yambol	24	7	17	1868	2010	−142	31	Advance to playoffs
9	Levski Sofia	24	4	20	1753	2079	−326	28	

Source: NBL

=== Results ===
==== First stage ====
Home \ Away	ACA	BAL	BER	CHE	LEV	LUK	RIL	SPA	YAM
Academic Plovdiv		88–81	89–77	90–89	98–76	74–72	96–85	95–82	87–78
Balkan	94–74		84–65	85–73	75–63	76–88	85–72	78–79	90–87
Beroe	82–75	87–61		79–64	104–75	80–87	88–72	96–65	102–77
Cherno More	70–71	58–76	63–86		100–78	75–86	81–74	78–76	78–69
Levski	58–91	61–76	85–81	79–70		52–90	61–78	86–90	80–73
Lukoil Academic	104–66	94–68	82–72	87–74	84–69		66–75	104–71	91–69
Rilski Sportis	94–82	91–58	101–85	84–75	95–66	90–94		89–79	102–90
Špartak Pleven	88–90	88–83	75–81	93–77	77–72	108–104	93–77		92–66
Yambol	94–81	55–62	57–83	76–87	78–67	70–78	95–91	84–80	

Source: NBL
Legend: Blue = home team win; Yellow = draw; Red = away team win.

==== Second stage ====
Home and away games depend of table after the first stage.

Home \ Away	ACA	BAL	BER	CHE	LEV	LUK	RIL	SPA	YAM
Academic Plovdiv		85–82	64–85				80–83	97–96	
Balkan				94–71	96–70			95–71	78–69
Beroe		64–79		77–67			79–74	84–89	
Cherno More	77–80				84–80	60–107			85–80
Levski	105–106		74–91			70–91	69–85		
Lukoil Academic	82–80	62–59	94–79				108–76		
Rilski Sportis		80–73		97–94				87–86	76–90
Špartak Pleven				88–77	73–76	76–82			95–88
Yambol	78–89		72–82		93–81	80–71			

Source: NBL
Legend: Blue = home team win; Yellow = draw; Red = away team win.

== Playoffs ==
Quarterfinals
1	Lukoil Academic	109	85
8	Yambol	71	71
4	Rilski Sportist	81	75	82
5	Balkan Botevgrad	79	100	73
2	Academic Bultex 99	91	79	92
7	Cherno More Ticha	73	85	94
3	Beroe	81	92	103
6	Spartak Pleven	69	93	79

Semifinals
1	Lukoil Academic	80	95	86	80	80
4	Rilski Sportist	89	80	90	66	76
7	Cherno More Ticha	68	81	68
3	Beroe	102	87	94

Finals
1	Lukoil Academic	96	82	64	83
3	Beroe	81	73	74	76
Third place
4	Rilski Sportist	102	94
7	Cherno More Ticha	82	62

== NBL clubs in European competitions ==
Team	Competition	Progress
Lukoil Academic	FIBA Europe Cup	Second round
Rilski Sportist	FIBA Europe Cup	Regular season
Beroe	Balkan League	Champions
