= Nikolay Ilov =

Bulgarian basketball player

Personal information
- Nationality: Bulgarian
- Born: 30 April 1932 (age 92); Pleven, Bulgaria

Sport
- Sport: Basketball

Nikolay Vasilev Ilov (Bulgarian: Николай Василев Илов, born 30 April 1932) is a Bulgarian former basketball player. He competed in the men's tournament at the 1956 Summer Olympics, and the 1960 Summer Olympics.
