= Konstantin Georgiev =

Bulgarian basketball player

Personal information
- Nationality: Bulgarian
- Born: 26 October 1931; Sofia, Bulgaria
- Died: 25 December 2015 (aged 84)

Sport
- Sport: Basketball

Konstantin Dimitrov Georgiev (Bulgarian: Константин Димитров Георгиев, 26 October 1931 – 25 December 2016) was a Bulgarian basketball player. He competed in the men's tournament at the 1952 Summer Olympics.
