= Boycho Branzov =

Bulgarian basketball player

Personal information
- Nationality: Bulgarian
- Born: 28 May 1946; Burgas, Bulgaria
- Died: 2 June 2003 (aged 57)

Sport
- Sport: Basketball

Boycho Branzov (Bulgarian: Бойчо Брънзов, 28 May 1946 – 30 May 2003) was a Bulgarian basketball player. He competed in the men's tournament at the 1968 Summer Olympics.
