= Ivaylo Kirov (basketball) =

Bulgarian basketball player

Personal information
- Nationality: Bulgarian
- Born: 16 February 1947; Sofia, Bulgaria
- Died: 26 February 2010 (aged 63)

Sport
- Sport: Basketball

Ivaylo Kirov (Bulgarian: Ивайло Киров, 16 February 1947 – 26 February 2010) was a Bulgarian basketball player. He competed in the men's tournament at the 1968 Summer Olympics.
