= Khristo Tsvetkov =

Bulgarian basketball player (1934–2018)

Personal information
- Nationality: Bulgarian
- Born: 6 March 1934; Euglene, Bulgaria
- Died: 31 January 2018 (aged 83); Sofia, Bulgaria

Sport
- Sport: Basketball

Khristo Tsvetkov (Bulgarian: Христо Цветков; 6 March 1934 – 31 January 2018) was a Bulgarian basketball player. He competed in the men's tournament at the 1960 Summer Olympics.
