= Konstantin Totev =

Bulgarian basketball player

Personal information
- Nationality: Bulgarian
- Born: 24 January 1927; Veliko Tarnovo, Bulgaria
- Died: 2006 (aged 78–79); Sofia, Bulgaria

Sport
- Sport: Basketball

Konstantin Khristov Totev (Bulgarian: Константин Христов Тотев, 24 January 1927 – 2006) was a Bulgarian basketball player. He competed in the men's tournament at the 1952 Summer Olympics and the 1956 Summer Olympics.
