= Ivan Nikolov (basketball) =

Bulgarian basketball player

Personal information
- Nationality: Bulgarian
- Born: 1928
- Died: January 2014 (aged 85–86)

Sport
- Sport: Basketball

Ivan Vladimirov Nikolov (Bulgarian: Иван Владимиров Николов, 1928 – January 2014) was a Bulgarian basketball player. He competed in the men's tournament at the 1952 Summer Olympics.
