= Anton Kuzov =

Bulgarian basketball player

Personal information
- Full name: Антон Кузов
- Nationality: Bulgarian
- Born: 22 August 1929

Sport
- Sport: Basketball

Anton Milanov Kuzov (Bulgarian: Антон Миланов Кузов, born 22 August 1929, date of death unknown) was a Bulgarian basketball player. He competed in the men's tournament at the 1952 Summer Olympics.
