= Neycho Neychev =

Bulgarian basketball coach

Personal information
- Nationality: Bulgarian
- Born: 9 June 1930
- Died: 1995 (aged 64–65)

Sport
- Sport: Basketball

Neycho Ivanov Neychev (Bulgarian: Нейчо Иванов Нейчев, born 9 June 1930 – 1995) was a former Bulgarian basketball player. He competed in the men's tournament at the 1952 Summer Olympics.
