= Tsvetko Slavov =

Bulgarian basketball player

Personal information
- Nationality: Bulgarian
- Born: 28 March 1934 (age 91); Sofia, Bulgaria

Sport
- Sport: Basketball

Tsvetko Ruskov Slavov (Bulgarian: Цветко Русков Славов, born 28 March 1934) is a Bulgarian former basketball player. He competed in the men's tournament at the 1956 Summer Olympics, and the 1960 Summer Olympics.
