= Stefan Filipov =

Bulgarian basketball player

Personal information
- Nationality: Bulgarian
- Born: 8 January 1943 (age 82); Sofia, Bulgaria

Sport
- Sport: Basketball

Stefan Filipov (Bulgarian: Стефан Филипов, born 8 January 1943) is a former Bulgarian basketball player. He competed in the men's tournament at the 1968 Summer Olympics.
