= Mincho Dimov =

Bulgarian basketball player

Personal information
- Nationality: Bulgarian
- Born: 4 January 1940 (age 85); Mincho, Bulgaria

Sport
- Sport: Basketball

Mincho Dimov (Bulgarian: Минчо Димов, born 4 January 1940) is a former Bulgarian basketball player. He competed in the men's tournament at the 1968 Summer Olympics.
