= Iliya Georgiev =

Bulgarian basketball player

Personal information
- Nationality: Bulgarian
- Born: 25 July 1925

Sport
- Sport: Basketball

Iliya Asenov Georgiev (Bulgarian: Илия Асенов Георгиев, born 25 July 1925) was a Bulgarian basketball player. He competed in the men's tournament at the 1952 Summer Olympics.
