= Chavdar Kostov =

Bulgarian basketball player

Rilski Sportist
- Position: Shooting guard / small forward
- League: NBL

Personal information
- Born: 18 April 1988 (age 38) Sofia, Bulgaria
- Listed height: 6 ft 5 in (1.96 m)
- Listed weight: 205 lb (93 kg)

Career information
- NBA draft: 2010: undrafted
- Playing career: 2006–present

Career history
- 2005–2010: Lukoil Academic
- 2010–2012: Kavala
- 2012–2013: Levski Sofia
- 2013–2014: Lukoil Academic
- 2014–2015: UBC Güssing Knights
- 2015–2016: Kavala
- 2016–2017: Kymis
- 2017–2019: Rabotnički
- 2019–2022: Levski Lukoil
- 2022–present: Rilski Sportist

Career highlights
- Macedonian Cup MVP (2019); 5× Bulgarian League champion (2006–2010); Austrian League champion (2015); Macedonian League champion (2018); 3× Bulgarian Cup winner (2006–2008); Austrian Cup winner (2015); Bulgarian League All-Star (2008)

Chavdar Kostov (Bulgarian: Чавдар Костов; born 18 April 1988) is a Bulgarian professional basketball player who currently plays for Rilski Sportist of the NBL. Standing at 1.95 m (6 ft 5 in), he plays as a shooting guard and small forward.

== Professional career ==
From 2005 to 2010, Kostov played with Lukoil Academic in Bulgaria, where he also started his pro career. During his tenue with the team, he won 5 Bulgarian championships and 3 Bulgarian Cups. On 5 October 2010 he signed a one-year deal with Kavala of the Greek Basket League. He renewed his contract with the team until 2012.

On 2012 he signed a one-year deal with Bulgarian club Levski Sofia. On 25 May 2011 he returned to Lukoil Academic. After one season he left Lukoil, and signed with Austrian club UBC Güssing Knights. With the Kings, he won both the Austrian league and the Austrian Cup.

On 22 September 2015 he returned to Kavala., On 4 November 2016 Kostov signed with Kymis of the Greek Basket League, replacing Musa Abdul-Aleem on the team's squad.

On 15 August 2017 he signed with Macedonian club Rabotnički.
