= Atanas Atanasov (basketball) =

Bulgarian basketball player (1935–2021)

Atanas Atanasov (Atanas Peychinski, Атанас Пейчински)
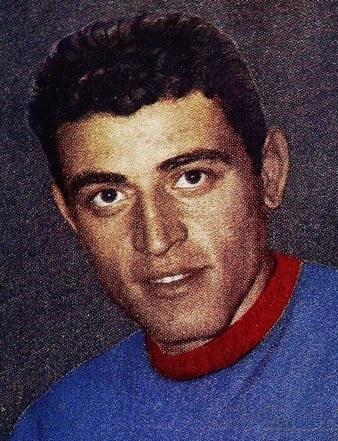

Personal information
- National team: Bulgarian national team
- Born: 19 November 1935; Pleven, Bulgaria
- Died: 3 September 2021 (aged 85); Sofia, Bulgaria

Sport
- Sport: Basketball

Atanas Vasilev Atanasov (Bulgarian: Атанас Василев Атанасов, 19 November 1935 – 3 September 2021) was a Bulgarian basketball player. He competed in the men's tournament at the 1956 Summer Olympics, and the 1960 Summer Olympics. He was also a silver medalist at the European Championships in Sofia in 1957, and a bronze medalist at the European Championships in Belgrade in 1961. He was included in the ideal team of the World Championships in Chile, 1959. Atanasov died on 3 September 2021, at the age of 85.
