= Georgi Khristov (basketball) =

Bulgarian basketball player (born 1947)

Personal information
- Nationality: Bulgarian
- Born: 14 October 1947 (age 78) Botevgrad, Bulgaria

Sport
- Sport: Basketball

Georgi Khristov (Bulgarian: Георги Христов; born 14 October 1947) is a former Bulgarian basketball player. He competed in the men's tournament at the 1968 Summer Olympics.
