= Kiril Semov =

Bulgarian basketball coach

Personal information
- Nationality: Bulgarian
- Born: 23 May 1930
- Died: 23 November 2001 (aged 71)

Sport
- Sport: Basketball

Kiril Marinov Semov (Bulgarian: Кирил Семов, 23 May 1930 – 23 November 2001) was a Bulgarian basketball player. He competed in the men's tournament at the 1952 Summer Olympics.
