= Petar Shishkov =

Bulgarian basketball player

Personal information
- Nationality: Bulgarian
- Born: 8 April 1924; Panagyurishte, Bulgaria
- Died: 8 September 2008 (aged 84)

Sport
- Sport: Basketball

Petar Angelov Shishkov (Bulgarian: Петър Ангелов Шишков; 8 April 1924 – 8 September 2008) was a Bulgarian basketball player. He competed in the men's tournament at the 1952 Summer Olympics.
