= Slavey Raychev =

Bulgarian basketball player

Personal information
- Nationality: Bulgarian
- Born: 29 October 1943 (age 81)

Sport
- Sport: Basketball

Slavey Raychev (Bulgarian: Славей Райчев, born 29 October 1943) is a former Bulgarian basketball player. He competed in the men's tournament at the 1968 Summer Olympics.
