= Petko Lazarov =

Bulgarian basketball player

Personal information
- Nationality: Bulgarian
- Born: 28 October 1935 (age 89); Plovdiv, Bulgaria

Sport
- Sport: Basketball

Petko Lazarov (Bulgarian: Петко Лазаров, born 28 October 1935) is a former Bulgarian basketball player. He competed in the men's tournament at the 1960 Summer Olympics.
