= Stefan Stoykov (basketball) =

Bulgarian basketball player

Personal information
- Nationality: Bulgarian
- Born: 28 January 1938; Mikre, Bulgaria
- Died: 12 April 2013 (aged 75); Pleven, Bulgaria

Sport
- Sport: Basketball

Stefan Stoykov (Bulgarian: Стефан Стойков, 28 January 1938 – 12 April 2013) was a Bulgarian basketball player. He competed in the men's tournament at the 1960 Summer Olympics.
