= Lyubomir Panov =

Bulgarian basketball player (1933–2022)

Personal information
- Nationality: Bulgarian
- Born: 16 February 1933; Pleven, Bulgaria
- Died: August 2022 (aged 89)

Sport
- Sport: Basketball

Lyubomir Ivanov Panov (Bulgarian: Любомир Иванов Панов, 16 February 1933 – August 2022) was a Bulgarian basketball player. He competed in the men's tournament at the 1956 Summer Olympics, and the 1960 Summer Olympics.
