= Georgi Panov =

Bulgarian basketball player (1933–2016)

Personal information
- Nationality: Bulgarian
- Born: 14 November 1933; Pleven, Bulgaria
- Died: 25 December 2016 (aged 83)

Sport
- Sport: Basketball

Georgi Marinov Panov (Bulgarian: Георги Маринов Панов, 14 November 1933 – 25 December 2016) was a Bulgarian basketball player. He competed in the men's tournament at the 1952 Summer Olympics, 1956 Summer Olympics, and the 1960 Summer Olympics. Pan died on 25 December 2016, at the age of 83.
