= Vladimir Savov =

Bulgarian basketball player

Personal information
- Nationality: Bulgarian
- Born: 19 August 1928

Sport
- Sport: Basketball

Vladimir Stoyanov Savov (Bulgarian: Владимир Стоянов Савов, born 19 August 1928) is a Bulgarian former basketball player. He competed in the men's tournament at the 1952 Summer Olympics, and the 1956 Summer Olympics.
