= Hungary men's national basketball team =

Hungary
- FIBA ranking: 46 ▲1 (1 September 2026)
- Joined FIBA: 1935
- FIBA zone: FIBA Europe
- National federation: MKOSZ
- Coach: Gašper Okorn
- Nickname: Magyars

Olympic Games
- Appearances: 4
- Medals: None

FIBA World Cup
- Appearances: None

EuroBasket
- Appearances: 16
- Medals: (gold) Gold: (1955); (silver) Silver: (1953); (bronze) Bronze: (1946)
Home	Away

First international
- Latvia 46–12 Hungary (Geneva, Switzerland; 2 May 1935)

Biggest win
- Malta 43–138 Hungary (Ta' Qali, Malta; 13 June 2001)

Biggest defeat
- Lithuania 79–15 Hungary (Kaunas, Lithuania; 26 May 1939)

The Hungary men's national basketball team (Hungarian: Magyar nemzeti kosárlabda-válogatott) represents Hungary in international basketball tournaments. It is governed by the Hungarian Basketball Federation (MKOSZ).

Hungary's best period in international basketball competitions came in the 1940s to the 1960s. It was when the national team won several medals at the EuroBasket (1946, 1953, 1955), and reached the Olympic Games on four out of the first six editions of the event overall. However, since 1969, the team has only qualified for the continental showpiece three times (1999, 2017, 2022). Hungary also continues to vie for their debut appearance at the FIBA World Cup.

== History ==
=== EuroBasket 1935 ===
The Hungarian side came in ninth place at the first European Basketball Championship, the EuroBasket 1935 held by the International Basketball Federation's FIBA Europe continental federation. They faced the eventual champions Latvia in the preliminary round, falling 46–12. In the classification matches, the Hungarians lost to Bulgaria, then defeated Romania to finish ninth with a 1–2 record.

=== EuroBasket 1939 ===
After not competing in the 1937 edition, the Hungarians returned to the EuroBasket 1939. Once again, Hungary was one of eight teams that qualified for the event. Hungary lost its first six games. The biggest defeat was a massive blowout to the host Lithuania 79-15. Although in their last match, Hungary displayed a strong performance as they defeated Finland 45-16 which provided some reconciliation for their loss against Lithuania. Hungary eventually finished the tournament seventh in the eight team field.

=== EuroBasket 1946 ===
The next European competition was the EuroBasket 1946. Hungary placed second in their preliminary round group of four, losing to Italy but defeating Luxembourg and Poland. This qualified the Hungarians for the semi-finals, which they lost to Czechoslovakia. In the bronze medal match, Hungary defeated France 38–32.

=== EuroBasket 1947 ===
Hungary competed at the EuroBasket 1947 the next year. Their 1–1 record in the preliminary phase was sufficient for them to advance to the semifinal groups; However, they lost all three games there. In the 7th/8th place classification match, they defeated Bulgaria 59–29 to finish seventh of the fourteen teams.

=== EuroBasket 1953 ===
Hungary's next appearance at the EuroBasket 1953 in Moscow, resulted in the team's second EuroBasket medal. Their preliminary group adversaries included hosts and defending champions Soviet Union, who gave Hungary their only loss in the pool. Their 2–1 record put Hungary in second place in the pool and advanced them to the final round. There, they lost again to the Soviets as well as fellow perennial powers Czechoslovakia and France. Hungary defeated the other four teams in the round, however, their 4–3 record put them in a tie with Czechoslovakia, France, and Israel. The Hungarians came out on top of the tie-breaker, as they finished in second place overall behind the Soviet Union to take the silver medal.

=== EuroBasket 1955 ===
The Hungarian capital Budapest gained the hosting rights for the EuroBasket 1955. The results of the preliminary round were hardly surprising for the Hungarians, as they won all three of their games to proceed to the final round. Their first match in that round was against Czechoslovakia, and the Hungarians quickly found themselves in the bottom half of the final round group with a 75–65 loss. Their next four games, however, were much different and Hungary defeated Poland, Italy, Bulgaria and Yugoslavia to rise to a 4–1 record. This put them in a tie for the lead of the group with the Soviet Union, which had lost to Czechoslovakia.

In a game that was never particularly close, the Hungarians handed the Soviets only their second loss, 82–68, in 34 games and four EuroBasket tournaments. Hungary advanced to 5–1, in sole lead of the pool, which they never relinquished. Hungary then finished it all off in victorious fashion over Romania to win the gold medal at the Euros for the first time.

=== EuroBasket 1957 ===
At the EuroBasket 1957 Hungary cruised to a 3-0 record in their preliminary phase group, with their only true test coming in a narrow 66-65 victory over Romania. It was enough for national team to advance to the final round of the competition. There, they lost in turn to each of the other three preliminary pool winners, finishing at 4–3 in the round to take fourth place overall.

=== EuroBasket 2017 ===
EuroBasket 2017 marked the first EuroBasket appearance for the national team since 1999. With no real expectations heading into it, Hungary surprised many with their performance in the preliminary stage getting their first EuroBasket victory since 1969. They finished with a 2-3 record, with wins over the Czech Republic, and Romania. It was enough for the national team to advance to the knockout stage. There they matched up against Serbia, where they put up an valiant effort in defeat against the eventual runners-up 86-78.

=== EuroBasket 2022 qualification ===
At the EuroBasket 2022 qualification, Hungary surprisingly defeated defending Champion Slovenia 77-75. Benedek Váradi labelled the victory as "among the most important" in his career.

== Competitive record ==
=== FIBA World Cup ===
World Cup					Qualification		
Year	Position	Pld	W	L	Pld	W	L
(Argentina) 1950	Did not enter				Did not enter		
(Brazil) 1954	Banned from entering				EuroBasket served as qualifiers		
(Chile) 1959	Did not qualify				EuroBasket served as qualifiers		
(Brazil) 1963	Did not qualify				EuroBasket served as qualifiers		
(Uruguay) 1967	Did not qualify				EuroBasket served as qualifiers		
(Socialist Federal Republic of Yugoslavia) 1970	Did not qualify				EuroBasket served as qualifiers		
(Puerto Rico) 1974	Did not qualify				EuroBasket served as qualifiers		
(Philippines) 1978	Did not qualify				EuroBasket served as qualifiers		
(Colombia) 1982	Did not qualify				EuroBasket served as qualifiers		
(Spain) 1986	Did not qualify				6	1	5
(Argentina) 1990	Did not qualify				EuroBasket served as qualifiers		
(Canada) 1994	Did not qualify				EuroBasket served as qualifiers		
(Greece) 1998	Did not qualify				EuroBasket served as qualifiers		
(United States) 2002	Did not qualify				EuroBasket served as qualifiers		
(Japan) 2006	Did not qualify				EuroBasket served as qualifiers		
(Turkey) 2010	Did not qualify				EuroBasket served as qualifiers		
(Spain) 2014	Did not qualify				EuroBasket served as qualifiers		
(China) 2019	Did not qualify				12	6	6
(Philippines) (Japan) (Indonesia) 2023	Did not qualify				12	6	6
(Qatar) 2027	To be determined				In progress		
(France) 2031	To be determined				To be determined		
Total	0/19				30	13	17

=== Olympic Games ===
Olympic Games					Qualifying		
Year	Position	Pld	W	L	Pld	W	L
(Nazi Germany) 1936	w/o^{A}	2	0	2			
(United Kingdom) 1948	16th	8	3	5			
(Finland) 1952	13th	6	2	4			
(Australia) 1956	Declined participation						
(Italy) 1960	9th	8	5	3	5	4	1
(Japan) 1964	13th	9	4	5	8	6	2
(Mexico) 1968	Did not enter				Did not enter		
(West Germany) 1972	Did not qualify				3	1	2
(Canada) 1976	Did not enter				Did not enter		
(Soviet Union) 1980	Did not qualify				4	1	3
(United States) 1984	Did not enter				Did not enter		
(South Korea) 1988	Did not enter				Did not enter		
(Spain) 1992	Did not qualify				5	1	4
(United States) 1996	Did not qualify				Did not qualify		
(Australia) 2000	Did not qualify				Did not qualify		
(Greece) 2004	Did not qualify				Did not qualify		
(China) 2008	Did not qualify				Did not qualify		
(United Kingdom) 2012	Did not qualify				Did not qualify		
(Brazil) 2016	Did not qualify				Did not qualify		
(Japan) 2020	Did not qualify				Did not qualify		
(France) 2024	Did not qualify				3	0	3
(United States) 2028	To be determined				To be determined		
Total	4/21	33	14	19	28	13	15

Notes

^{^A} Hungary withdrew from the tournament.
FIBA considers two games as forfeited (walkover)

=== EuroBasket ===
EuroBasket					Qualification		
Year	Position	Pld	W	L	Pld	W	L
(Switzerland) 1935	9th	3	1	2			
(Latvia) 1937	Did not enter						
(Lithuania) 1939	7th	7	1	6			
(Switzerland) 1946	3rd place, bronze medalist(s)	5	3	2			
(Czechoslovakia) 1947	7th	6	2	4			
(Egypt) 1949	Did not enter						
(France) 1951	Did not enter						
(Soviet Union) 1953	2nd place, silver medalist(s)	10	6	4			
(Hungary) 1955	1st place, gold medalist(s)	10	9	1			
(Bulgaria) 1957	4th	10	7	3			
(Turkey) 1959	4th	8	5	3			
(Socialist Federal Republic of Yugoslavia) 1961	6th	8	3	5			
(Poland) 1963	4th	9	5	4	Direct qualification		
(Soviet Union) 1965	15th	9	1	8	Direct qualification		
(Finland) 1967	13th	9	4	5	3	2	1
(Italy) 1969	8th	7	2	5	4	3	1
(West Germany) 1971	Did not qualify				4	2	2
(Spain) 1973	Did not qualify				7	3	4
(Socialist Federal Republic of Yugoslavia) 1975	Did not qualify				9	5	4
(Belgium) 1977	Did not qualify				10	4	6
(Italy) 1979	Did not qualify				5	2	3
(Czechoslovakia) 1981	Did not qualify				5	1	4
(France) 1983	Did not qualify				17	10	7
(West Germany) 1985	Did not qualify				12	6	6
(Greece) 1987	Did not qualify				5	1	4
(Socialist Federal Republic of Yugoslavia) 1989	Did not qualify				10	5	5
(Italy) 1991	Did not qualify				4	1	3
(Germany) 1993	Did not qualify				12	7	5
(Greece) 1995	Did not qualify				12	5	7
(Spain) 1997	Did not qualify				10	4	6
(France) 1999	13th	3	0	3	10	6	4
(Turkey) 2001	Did not qualify				10	5	5
(Sweden) 2003	Did not qualify				16	9	7
(Serbia and Montenegro) 2005	Did not qualify				12	6	6
(Spain) 2007	Did not qualify				12	6	6
(Poland) 2009	Did not qualify				14	6	8
(Lithuania) 2011	Did not qualify				12	3	9
(Slovenia) 2013	Did not qualify				8	3	5
(France) (Croatia) (Germany) (Latvia) 2015	Did not qualify				10	5	5
(Finland) (Israel) (Romania) (Turkey) 2017	16th	6	2	4	6	6	0
(Czech Republic) (Georgia (country)) (Italy) (Germany) 2022	23rd	5	0	5	6	4	2
(Cyprus) (Finland) (Poland) (Latvia) 2025	Did not qualify				6	2	4
(Estonia) (Greece) (Slovenia) (Spain) 2029	To be determined				To be determined		
Total	16/42	115	51	64	251	122	129

== Results and fixtures ==
Win Loss

=== 2025 ===
6 August 2025 2027 FIBA World Cup pre-qualifiers – 2nd round	Romania	76–64	Hungary	Oradea, Romania
19:00 (UTC+3)	Scoring by quarter: 13–21, 19–11, 22–16, 22–16
	Pts: Măciucă 21; Rebs: Măciucă 7 Asts: Kuti 7	Boxscore	Pts: Perl 15; Rebs: Reuvers 8 Asts: Perl, Pongó 3	Arena: Oradea Arena; Attendance: 3,544; Referees: Ademir Zurapović (BIH), Dariusz Zapolski (POL), Juozas Barkauskas (LTU)

9 August 2025 2027 FIBA World Cup pre-qualifiers – 2nd round	Hungary	96–58	North Macedonia	Szolnok, Hungary
18:00 (UTC+2)	Scoring by quarter: 19–18, 34–19, 17–14, 26–7
	Pts: Pongó 15; Rebs: Golomán 11; Asts: Váradi 5	Boxscore	Pts: Wiley 15; Rebs: Simikj 5 Asts: three players 2	Arena: Tiszaligeti Sportcsarnok; Attendance: 2,000; Referees: Julio Anaya (PAN), Aleksandar Glišić (SRB), Martin Vulić (CRO)

16 August 2025 2027 FIBA World Cup pre-qualifiers – 2nd round	Hungary	86–66	Romania	Szolnok, Hungary
18:00 (UTC+2)	Scoring by quarter: 19–18, 21–20, 26–5, 20–23
	Pts: Reuvers 25; Rebs: Meleg, Váradi 6 Asts: Váradi 7	Boxscore	Pts: Cățe 14; Rebs: Cățe 8 Asts: Diculescu, Kuti 5	Arena: Tiszaligeti Sportcsarnok; Attendance: 2,000; Referees: Antonio Conde (ESP), Boris Krejić (SVN), Ofer Manheim (ISR)

20 August 2025 2027 FIBA World Cup pre-qualifiers – 2nd round	North Macedonia	82–75	Hungary	Skopje, North Macedonia
19:00 (UTC+2)	Scoring by quarter: 23–15, 22–17, 19–18, 18–25
	Pts: Wiley 23; Rebs: Hot 5 Asts: Mitrevski 5	Boxscore	Pts: Vojvoda 21; Rebs: Golomán, Meleg 5 Asts: Váradi 3	Arena: SRC Kale; Attendance: 1,000; Referees: Gatis Saliņš (LAT), Michał Proc (POL), Gintaras Mačiulis (LTU)

28 November 2025 2027 FIBA World Cup qualifiers – 1st round	Hungary	89–82	Finland	Szombathely, Hungary
18:00 (UTC+1)	Scoring by quarter: 31–17, 29–22, 15–22, 14–21
	Pts: Perl 25; Rebs: Reuvers 6 Asts: Somogyi 6	Boxscore	Pts: Salin 16; Rebs: Muurinen 8 Asts: Jantunen, Salin 4	Arena: Arena Savaria; Attendance: 2,700; Referees: Martin Vulić (CRO), Yener Yılmaz (TUR), Ioannis Agrafiotis (GRE)

1 December 2025 2027 FIBA World Cup qualifiers – 1st round	Belgium	85–87	Hungary	Mons, Belgium
20:30 (UTC+1)	Scoring by quarter: 15–18, 21–27, 19–21, 30–21
	Pts: Obasohan 31; Rebs: Tumba 12; Asts: Mennes, Obasohan 5	Boxscore	Pts: Reuvers 26; Rebs: Reuvers 10; Asts: Somogyi 13	Arena: Mons.Arena; Attendance: 1,526; Referees: Ariadna Chueca (ESP), Andris Aunkrogers (LAT), Mehmet Şahin (TUR)

=== 2026 ===
27 February 2026 2027 FIBA World Cup qualifiers – 1st round	Hungary	71–74	France	Szombathely, Hungary
18:00 (UTC+1)	Scoring by quarter: 15–16, 16–22, 16–17, 24–19
	Pts: Perl 21; Rebs: Golomán 6 Asts: Somogyi 7	Boxscore	Pts: Noua 15; Rebs: Cornelie, Noua 6 Asts: Francisco 5	Arena: Arena Savaria; Attendance: 2,900; Referees: Gvidas Gedvilas (LTU), Zafer Yılmaz (TUR), Ofer Manheim (ISR)

1 March 2026 2027 FIBA World Cup qualifiers – 1st round	France	98–79	Hungary	Le Mans, France
18:00 (UTC+1)	Scoring by quarter: 25–16, 30–19, 19–24, 24–20
	Pts: Noua 21; Rebs: Hoard 6 Asts: Okobo 5	Boxscore	Pts: Perl 18; Rebs: four players 4 Asts: Perl 5	Arena: Antarès; Attendance: 5,812; Referees: Petar Pešić (SRB), Ivor Matějek (CZE), Ioannis Agrafiotis (GRE)

3 July 2026 2027 FIBA World Cup qualifiers – 1st round	Finland	85–77	Hungary	Helsinki, Finland
18:30 (UTC+3)	Scoring by quarter: 13–18, 35–25, 26–15, 11–19
	Pts: Markkanen 23; Rebs: Gustavson 6 Asts: Little, Salin 3	Boxscore	Pts: Golomán, Perl 18; Rebs: Valerio-Bodon 6 Asts: Somogyi 5	Arena: Veikkaus Arena; Attendance: 12,489; Referees: Andris Aunkrogers (LAT), Gintaras Mačiulis (LTU), Mehmet Şahin (TUR)

6 July 2026 2027 FIBA World Cup qualifiers – 1st round	Hungary	85–70	Belgium	Székesfehérvár, Hungary
18:00 (UTC+2)	Scoring by quarter: 23–19, 23–17, 16–21, 23–13
	Pts: Perl 19; Rebs: Maronka 5 Asts: Somogyi 11	Boxscore	Pts: three players 10; Rebs: Guisse 12; Asts: Lecomte 4	Arena: MET Aréna; Attendance: 4,752; Referees: Paulo Marques (POR), Branimir Galić (CRO), Nermin Hodžić (GER)

27 August 2026 2027 FIBA World Cup qualifiers – 2nd round	Hungary	85–67	Estonia	Miskolc, Hungary
18:00 (UTC+2)	Scoring by quarter: 13–14, 24–20, 26–22, 22–11
	Pts: Perl 22; Rebs: Reuvers 8 Asts: Somogyi 5	Boxscore	Pts: Kullamäe 26; Rebs: Raieste 6 Asts: Suurorg 4	Arena: DVTK Aréna; Attendance: 1,800; Referees: Martin Vulić (CRO), Martin Horozov (BUL), Çisil Güngör (TUR)

30 August 2026 2027 FIBA World Cup qualifiers – 2nd round	Slovenia	92–77	Hungary	Ljubljana, Slovenia
20:00 (UTC+2)	Scoring by quarter: 25–17, 18–19, 32–23, 17–18
	Pts: Prepelič 24; Rebs: Omić 12; Asts: Prepelič 9	Boxscore	Pts: Reuvers 21; Rebs: Reuvers 5 Asts: Somogyi 3	Arena: Tivoli Hall; Attendance: 2,500; Referees: Gatis Saliņš (LAT), Juozas Barkauskas (LTU), Zdenko Tomašovič (SVK)

27 November 2026 2027 FIBA World Cup qualifiers – 2nd round	Sweden	vs.	Hungary	Stockholm, Sweden
19:00 (UTC+1)
		Boxscore		Arena: Avicii Arena

30 November 2026 2027 FIBA World Cup qualifiers – 2nd round	Hungary	vs.	Slovenia	Szombathely, Hungary
18:00 (UTC+1)
		Boxscore		Arena: Arena Savaria

=== 2027 ===
25 February 2027 2027 FIBA World Cup qualifiers – 2nd round	Estonia	vs.	Hungary	Estonia
--:-- (UTC+2)
		Boxscore

28 February 2027 2027 FIBA World Cup qualifiers – 2nd round	Hungary	vs.	Sweden	Hungary
--:-- (UTC+1)
		Boxscore

== Team ==
=== Current roster ===
Roster for the 2027 FIBA World Cup Qualifiers matches on 27 and 30 August 2026 against Estonia and Slovenia.

Hungary men's national basketball team roster
Players
Coaches

Pos.	No.	Name	Age – Date of birth	Height	Club	Ctr.
G	1	Botond Cseh	21 – 29 November 2004	1.97 m (6 ft 6 in)	Szolnok	(Hungary)
PG	3	Marcell Pongó	29 – 3 March 1997	1.93 m (6 ft 4 in)	Alba Fehérvár	(Hungary)
SG	5	Tamás Pallai	25 – 19 February 2001	1.93 m (6 ft 4 in)	Szolnok	(Hungary)
G	10	Benedek Váradi	31 – 5 February 1995	1.94 m (6 ft 4 in)	Falco	(Hungary)
SF	11	Szilárd Benke	31 – 22 May 1995	1.96 m (6 ft 5 in)	Atomerőmű	(Hungary)
F	12	Vincent Valerio-Bodon	25 – 2 May 2001	2.03 m (6 ft 8 in)	Budapesti Honvéd	(Hungary)
PG	13	Boris Krnjajski	27 – 31 October 1998	1.94 m (6 ft 4 in)	Szolnok	(Hungary)
C	14	György Golomán	30 – 2 April 1996	2.11 m (6 ft 11 in)	Legia Warsaw	(Poland)
PF	16	Gergö Meleg	26 – 28 January 2000	2.03 m (6 ft 8 in)	Alba Fehérvár	(Hungary)
SF	18	Norbert Lukács	25 – 18 May 2001	1.95 m (6 ft 5 in)	Nizhny Novgorod	(Russia)
SG	20	Zoltán Perl	31 – 28 July 1995	1.95 m (6 ft 5 in)	Falco	(Hungary)
G/F	30	Ádám Somogyi	26 – 30 June 2000	1.90 m (6 ft 3 in)	Bilbao	(Spain)
C	35	Nate Reuvers	27 – 30 September 1998	2.11 m (6 ft 11 in)	Valencia	(Spain)

Head coach

- (Slovenia) Gašper Okorn

Assistant coach(es)

- (Hungary) Miloš Konakov
- (Hungary) Ádám Sértő

Legend

- (C) Team captain
- Club – describes last
  club before the competition
- Age – describes age
  on 27 August 2026

=== Depth chart ===
Pos.	Starting 5	Bench 1	Bench 2
C	György Golomán	Vincent Valerio-Bodon	Gergö Meleg
PF	Norbert Lukács	Nate Reuvers
SF	Szilárd Benke	Ádám Somogyi
SG	Zoltán Perl	Boris Krnjajski	Tamás Pallai
PG	Benedek Váradi	Marcell Pongó	Botond Cseh

== Head coach history ==
- (Hungary) István Király – (1935–1948)
- (Hungary) János Páder – (1951–1955)
- (Hungary) Zoltán Csányi – (1957)
- (Hungary) János Páder – (1959–1963)
- (Hungary) Tibor Zsíros – (1963–1965)
- (Hungary) Eszéki Rezső – (1966–1967)
- (Hungary) János Szabó – (1967)
- (Hungary) Eszéki Rezső – (1967–1973)
- (Hungary) Balogh József – (1974–1977)
- (Hungary) Tibor Zsíros – (1978–1979)
- (Hungary) Ránky Mátyás – (1980–1985)
- (Hungary) Árpád Glatz – (1985–1986)
- (Hungary) Lajos Mészáros – (1986–1990)
- (Hungary) Ránky Mátyás – (1990–1991)
- (Hungary) Patonay Imre – (1992–1996)
- (Hungary) Lajos Mészáros – (1996–2001)
- (Hungary) Varga Mátyás – (2001–2003)
- (Hungary) Zsoldos András – (2003–2005)
- (Hungary) Meszlényi Róbert – (2005–2006)
- (Montenegro) Stojan Ivković – (2007–2008)
- (Hungary) Lajos Mészáros – (2008–2011)
- (Serbia) Branislav Džunić – (2010–2011)
- (Hungary) László Rátgéber – (2012)
- (Montenegro) Stojan Ivković – (2013–2023)
- (Slovenia) Gašper Okorn – (2024–present)

== Past rosters ==
1935 EuroBasket: finished 9th among 10 teams

3 Zoltán Csányi, 4 Ferenc Kolozs, 5 Emil Kozma, 6 Tibor Lehel, 7 Sándor Lelkes, 8 Sándor Nagy, 9 László Rózsa, 10 István Szamosi, 11 Zoltán Szúnyogh, 12 Ferenc Velkei (Coach: István Király)

1939 EuroBasket: finished 7th among 8 teams

3 Aba Szathmary, 4 János Gyimesi, 5 Géza Bajári, 6 Ferenc Velkei, 7 Géza Kardos, 8 Gyula Stolpa, 10 Sándor Csányi, 11 Zoltán Csányi, 12 János Szabó, 13 István Szamosi (Coach: István Király)

1946 EuroBasket: finished (bronze) among 10 teams

3 Tibor Mezőfi, 4 Antal Bánkuti, 5 Géza Bajári, 6 Ferenc Velkei, 7 Géza Kardos, 8 Ede Vadászi, 9 György Nagy, 11 Laszlo Kiralyhidi, 12 Géza Rácz, 14 Ferenc Németh (MVP) (Coach: István Király)

1947 EuroBasket: finished 7th among 14 teams

3 Laszlo Kiralyhidi, 4 László Novakovszky, 5 Ervin Kassai, 6 Gyula Toth, 8 Ede Vadászi, 9 Tibor Mezőfi, 10 Ferenc Németh, 11 Antal Bánkuti, 12 István Timár-Geng, 13 Béla Bánkuti, 14 Géza Kardos, 15 László Nádasdy (Coach: István Király)

1948 Olympic Games: finished 16th among 23 teams

3 György Nagy, 4 László Novakovszky, 5 Tibor Mezőfi, 6 István Lovrics, 7 Géza Kardos, 8 Ede Vadászi, 9 Tibor Zsíros, 10 János Halász, 11 Antal Bánkuti, 12 Attila Timár-Geng, 13 István Timár-Geng, 14 József Kozma (Coach: István Király)

1952 Olympic Games: finished 16th among 23 teams

3 György Telegdy, 4 György Bokor, 5 Tibor Mezőfi, 6 László Bánhegyi, 7 Péter Papp, 8 János Greminger, 9 Tibor Zsíros, 10 Pál Bogár, 11 János Simon, 13 Tibor Cselkó, 14 László Hódi, 15 Tibor Czinkán, 16 Ede Komáromi (Coach: János Páder)

1953 EuroBasket: finished (silver) among 17 teams

3 László Bánhegyi, 4 György Bokor, 5 Tibor Mezőfi, 6 Tibor Czinkán, 7 Péter Papp, 8 János Greminger, 9 Tibor Zsíros, 10 Pál Bogár, 11 János Simon, 12 Ede Komáromi, 13 Tibor Cselkó, 14 Tibor Remai, 15 László Hódi (Coach: János Páder)

1955 EuroBasket: finished (gold) among 18 teams

3 László Bánhegyi, 4 Tibor Czinkán, 5 Tibor Mezőfi, 6 László Hódi, 7 Péter Papp, 8 János Greminger (MVP), 9 Tibor Zsíros, 10 Pál Bogár, 11 János Simon, 12 János Bencze, 13 Tibor Cselkó, 14 Laszlo Toth, 15 Tibor Rémai, 16 János Dallos (Coach: János Páder)

1957 EuroBasket: finished 4th among 16 teams

3 László Bánhegyi, 4 Tibor Czinkán, 5 László Gabányi, 6 Zoltán Judik, 7 István Liptay, 8 János Greminger, 9 Tibor Zsíros, 10 Laszlo Toth, 11 János Simon, 12 János Bencze, 13 Pál Borbély, 14 Ervin Keszey (Coach: Zoltán Csányi)

1959 EuroBasket: finished 4th among 17 teams

3 László Bánhegyi, 4 Tibor Czinkán, 5 László Gabányi, 6 Zoltán Judik, 7 Ottó Temesvári, 8 János Greminger, 9 Tibor Zsíros, 10 Miklós Boháty, 11 János Simon, 12 János Bencze, 13 Kotszan Merenyi, 14 Árpád Glatz (Coach: János Páder)

1960 Olympic Games: finished 9th among 16 teams

3 László Bánhegyi, 4 Ottó Temesvári, 5 László Gabányi, 6 Zoltán Judik, 7 István Liptay, 8 János Greminger, 9 Tibor Zsíros, 10 Miklós Boháty, 11 János Simon, 12 János Bencze, 14 György Pólik, 15 Árpád Glatz (Coach: János Páder)

1961 EuroBasket: finished 6th among 19 teams

4 Miklós Boháty, 5 László Gabányi, 6 István Sahin Tóth, 7 Istvan Liptai, 8 János Tuboly, 9 György Pólik, 10 Geza Gyulai, 11 Gabor Kulcsar, 12 János Bencze, 13 Ottó Temesvári, 14 Valer Banna, 15 József Kovács (Coach: János Páder)

1963 EuroBasket: finished 4th among 16 teams

4 Miklós Boháty, 5 László Gabányi, 6 György Pólik, 7 György Vajdovics, 8 János Greminger, 9 József Prieszol, 10 Árpád Glatz, 11 János Simon, 12 János Bencze, 13 Tibor Kangyal, 14 Ottó Temesvári, 15 Pál Koczka (Coach: Tibor Zsíros)

1964 Olympic Games: finished 13th among 16 teams

4 Miklós Boháty, 5 László Gabányi, 6 György Pólik, 7 Pál Koczka, 8 János Greminger, 9 József Prieszol, 10 Tibor Kangyal, 11 Ödön Lendvay, 12 János Bencze, 13 János Rácz, 14 András Haán, 15 Árpád Glatz (Coach: Tibor Zsíros)

1965 EuroBasket: finished 15th among 16 teams

4 Matyas Ranky, 5 Laszlo Orbay, 6 György Pólik, 7 Pál Koczka, 8 Gábor Kulcsár, 9 István Fekete, 10 Valer Banna, 11 Ödön Lendvay, 12 Ferenc Haris, 13 János Rácz, 14 József Tóth, 15 Laszlo Koranyi (Coach: Tibor Zsíros)

1967 EuroBasket: finished 13th among 16 teams

4 Laszlo Orbay, 5 László Gabányi, 6 György Pólik, 7 József Kovács, 8 Gábor Kulcsár, 9 József Prieszol, 10 Valer Banna, 11 Imre Nyitrai, 12 Laszlo Koranyi, 13 István Halmos, 14 Ödön Lendvay, 15 Tibor Kangyal (Coach: János Szabó)

1969 EuroBasket: finished 8th among 12 teams

4 Laszlo Orbay, 5 László Gabányi, 6 József Kovács, 7 Tamás Pálffy, 8 István Bánhegyi, 9 József Prieszol, 10 Valer Banna, 11 Ödön Lendvay, 12 István Gyurasits, 13 Sándor Gellér, 14 Szabolcs Hody, 15 István Hegedűs (Coach: Rezso Eszeki)

1999 EuroBasket: finished 14th among 16 teams

4 Ernő Sitku, 5 Tamás Bencze, 6 László Kálmán, 7 Rolland Halm, 8 István Németh, 9 Kornél Dávid, 10 Tibor Pankár, 11 Zoltán Boros, 12 László Orosz, 13 Róbert Gulyás, 14 Zalán Mészáros, 15 László Czigler (Coach: Lajos Mészáros)

2017 EuroBasket: finished 16th among 24 teams

4 András Ruják, 5 Rosco Allen, 6 Ákos Keller, 7 Krisztián Wittmann, 8 Ádám Hanga, 9 Dávid Vojvoda, 10 Péter Kovács, 11 Norbert Tóth, 12 Csaba Ferencz, 20 Zoltán Perl, 21 Kemal Karahodžić, 22 János Eilingsfeld (Coach: Stojan Ivković)

2022 EuroBasket: finished 23rd among 24 teams

1 Mikael Hopkins, 5 Rosco Allen, 6 Ákos Keller (C), 8 Ádám Hanga, 9 Dávid Vojvoda, 11 Szilárd Benke, 12 Ádám Somogyi,
14 György Golomán, 15 Csaba Ferencz, 20 Zoltán Perl, 22 János Eilingsfeld, 25 Benedek Váradi (Coach: Stojan Ivković)

== Kit ==
=== Manufacturer ===
- 2016–2019: Spalding

=== Sponsor ===
- 2019: K&H Bank

== See also ==
- Hungary women's national basketball team
- Hungary men's national under-20 basketball team
- Hungary men's national under-18 basketball team
- Hungary men's national under-16 basketball team
- Hungary men's national 3x3 team
- Sport in Hungary
