= EuroBasket 1959 =

International basketball event

1959 Avrupa Basketbol Şampiyonası

Tournament details
- Host country: Turkey
- City: Istanbul
- Dates: 21–31 May
- Teams: 17
- Venue: 1 (in 1 host city)

Final positions
- Champions: Soviet Union (5th title)
- Runners-up: Czechoslovakia
- Third place: France
- Fourth place: Hungary

Tournament statistics
- MVP: (Soviet Union) Viktor Zubkov
- Top scorer: (Socialist Federal Republic of Yugoslavia) Radivoj Korać (27.6 points per game)

The 1959 FIBA European Championship, commonly called FIBA EuroBasket 1959, was the eleventh FIBA EuroBasket regional basketball championship, held by FIBA Europe. The tournament, which was hosted by Turkey, began on 21 May 1959 and concluded with the final on 31 May 1959. Seventeen national teams affiliated with the International Basketball Federation (FIBA) entered the competition. Mithat Paşa Stadium, Istanbul was the location of the event.

The Soviet Union claimed their fifth EuroBasket title, while Czechoslovakia captured the silver, and France the bronze.

== Results ==
=== First round ===
In the preliminary round, the 17 teams were split up into four groups. One of the groups had five teams, with the other three having four each. The top two teams in each group advanced to the final round, while the other nine teams were relegated to classification play.

==== Group A ====
Team	Pld	W	L	PF	PA	PD	Pts
Czechoslovakia	3	3	0	260	160	+100	6
Poland	3	2	1	184	197	−13	5
Spain	3	1	2	177	189	−12	4
Finland	3	0	3	147	222	−75	3

21 May 1959
11:30

Finland	57–72	Poland
Scoring by half: 29–39, 28–33
Pts: Lampén (12)		Pts: Nartowski (13)

22 May 1959
18:00

Czechoslovakia	85–62	Spain
Scoring by half: 40–27, 45–35
Pts: Konvička (19)		Pts: Rodriguez (15)

23 May 1959
18:00

Spain	57–43	Finland
Scoring by half: 27–22, 30–21
Pts: Rodriguez (19)		Pts: Lampén (16)

24 May 1959
18:00

Czechoslovakia	82–51	Poland
Scoring by half: 42–15, 40–36
Pts: Baumruk (22)		Pts: Wichowski (9)

25 May 1959
10:00

Czechoslovakia	93–47	Finland
Scoring by half: 49–23, 44–24
Pts: Konvička(15)		Pts: Lampén (20)

25 May 1959
16:30

Poland	61–58 (OT)	Spain
Scoring by half: 28–28, 27–27 Overtime: 6–3
Pts: Pstrokonski (16)		Pts: Martinez (22)

==== Group B ====
Team	Pld	W	L	PF	PA	PD	Pts
Bulgaria	3	2	1	219	208	+11	5
Belgium	3	2	1	196	187	+9	5
Yugoslavia	3	2	1	202	202	0	5
Turkey	3	0	3	173	193	−20	3

21 May 1959
21:30

Belgium	61–50	Turkey
Scoring by half: 22–28, 39–22
Pts: Aerts (20)		Pts: Erim (15)

22 May 1959
19:30

Bulgaria	80–72	Yugoslavia
Scoring by half: 42–35, 38–37
Pts: Radev (18)		Pts: Kristancic (22)

23 May 1959
21:00

Turkey	66–70	Yugoslavia
Scoring by half: 30–30, 36–40
Pts: Tezol (10)		Pts: Korac (38)

24 May 1959
16:30

Bulgaria	77–79	Belgium
Scoring by half: 39–46, 38–33
Pts: Atanasov (32)		Pts: Steveniers (21)

25 May 1959
18:00

Yugoslavia	60–56	Belgium
Scoring by half: 34–21, 26–35
Pts: Korac (26pts)		Pts: Steveniers (20pts)

25 May 1959
19:30

Bulgaria	62–57	Turkey
Scoring by half: 32–23, 30–34
Pts: Radev (21)		Pts: Erim (13)

==== Group C ====
Team	Pld	W	L	PF	PA	PD	Pts
Soviet Union	4	4	0	316	173	+143	8
France	4	3	1	252	228	+24	7
Italy	4	2	2	250	233	+17	6
Israel	4	1	3	145	216	−60	5
East Germany	4	0	4	133	224	−124	4

21 May 1959
18:00

Italy	74–59	Israel
Scoring by half: 30–30, 44–29
Pts: Pieri (19)		Pts: Klein (14)

21 May 1959
20:30

Soviet Union	80–48	France
Scoring by half: 42–23, 38–25
Pts: Zubkov (15)		Pts: Baillet (7)

22 May 1959
10:00

East Germany	37–87	Soviet Union
Scoring by half: 20–43, 17–44
Pts: Kulik (9)		Pts: Botchkarev (15)

22 May 1959
21:00

France	77–66	Israel
Scoring by half: 29–31, 48–35
Pts: Mayeur (18)		Pts: Klein (29)

23 May 1959
10:00

Israel	79–67	East Germany
Scoring by half: 44–37, 35–30
Pts: Hemmo (23)		Pts: Kulik (18)

23 May 1959
19:30

France	50–47	Italy
Scoring by half: 22–24, 28–23
Pts: Lefebvre (12)		Pts: Vianello (12)

24 May 1959
11:30

Italy	85–65	East Germany
Scoring by half: 37–33, 48–32
Pts: Gavagnin (20)		Pts: Kulik (21)

24 May 1959
19:30

Soviet Union	90–44	Israel
Scoring by half: 44–25, 46–19
Pts: Botchkarev (17)		Pts: Kastan (12)

25 May 1959
11:30

France	77–35	East Germany
Scoring by half: 39–16, 38–19
Pts: Dorigo (13)		Pts: Flau (11)

25 May 1959
21:00

Soviet Union	59–44	Italy
Scoring by half: 26–15, 33–29
Pts: Valdmanis (17pts)		Pts: Calebotta (17pts)

==== Group D ====
Team	Pld	W	L	PF	PA	PD	Pts
Romania	3	3	0	210	149	+61	6
Hungary	3	2	1	254	153	+101	5
Iran	3	1	2	145	216	−71	4
Austria	3	0	3	133	224	−91	3

21 May 1959
10:00

Hungary	109–48	Iran
Scoring by half: 50–23, 59–25
Pts: Banhegyi (17)		Pts: Agakuzik (13)

22 May 1959
11:30

Romania	83–48	Austria
Scoring by half: 33–21, 50–27
Pts: Novacek (19)		Pts: Ledl (13)

23 May 1959
11:30

Austria	43–92	Hungary
Scoring by half: 23–36, 20–56
Pts: Havlicek (9)		Pts: Gabanyi (14)

23 May 1959
16:30

Iran	48–65	Romania
Scoring by half: 19–31, 29–34
Pts: Solbi (12)		Pts: Folbert (18)

24 May 1959
10:00

Austria	42–49	Iran
Scoring by half: 26–18, 16–31
Pts: Privoznik (17)		Pts: Meshun (11)

25 May 1959
19:30

Romania	62–53	Hungary
Scoring by half: 28–25, 34–28
Pts: Novacek (24)		Pts: Bencze (17)

=== Classification round 1 ===
The first classification round was played in three round-robin groups. The first place from each group advanced to the second round to define the 9th–11th places, the second from each group, the 12th–14th and the remaining teams, the 14–17th places in the final standings.

==== Group 1 ====
Team	Pld	W	L	PF	PA	PD	Pts
Yugoslavia	2	2	0	175	119	+119	4
East Germany	2	1	1	122	145	−23	3
Austria	2	0	2	108	141	−71	2

26 May 1959
20:00

Yugoslavia	80–58	Austria
Scoring by half: 32–29, 48–29
Pts: Korac (32)		Pts: Privoznik (24)

27 May 1959
8:30

East Germany	61–95	Yugoslavia
Scoring by half: 25–43, 36–52
Pts: Flau (14)		Pts: Korac (21)

28 May 1959
8:30

East Germany	61–50	Austria
Scoring by half: 33–25, 28–25
Pts: Flau (18)		Pts: Privoznik (15)

==== Group 2 ====
Team	Pld	W	L	PF	PA	PD	Pts
Italy	2	2	0	138	100	+38	4
Turkey	2	1	1	108	123	−15	3
Spain	2	0	2	95	118	−23	2

26 May 1959
19:30

Turkey	53–50	Spain
Scoring by half: 25–21, 28–29
Pts: Büyükaycan (25)		Pts: Martinez (12)

27 May 1959
17:30

Turkey	55–73	Italy
Scoring by half: 25–39, 30–34
Pts: Büyükaycan (10)		Pts: Alesini (22)

28 May 1959
11:30

Italy	65–45	Spain
Scoring by half: 25–19, 40–26
Pts: Alesini (20)		Pts: Martinez (10)

==== Group 3 ====
Team	Pld	W	L	PF	PA	PD	Pts
Israel	2	2	0	124	98	+26	4
Finland	2	1	1	124	93	+31	3
Iran	2	0	2	80	137	−57	2

26 May 1959
21:00

Israel	56–55	Finland
Scoring by half: 26–29, 30–26
Pts: Hemmo (15)		Pts: Lampén (17)

27 May 1959
11:30

Iran	37–69	Finland
Scoring by half: 19–32, 18–37
Pts: Meshun (9)		Pts: Lampén (18)

28 May 1959
10:00

Israel	68–43	Iran
Scoring by half: 35–11, 33–32
Pts: Ben-Bassat (12)		Pts: Meshun (12)

=== Classification round 2 ===
==== Group 1 (9th–11th Place) ====
Team	Pld	W	L	PF	PA	PD	Pts
Yugoslavia	2	2	0	150	130	+20	4
Italy	2	1	1	151	134	+17	3
Israel	2	0	2	110	147	−37	2

29 May 1959
11:30

Italy	76–78	Yugoslavia
Scoring by half: 29–36, 47–42
Pts: Calebotta (20)		Pts: Korac (32)

30 May 1959
11:30

Yugoslavia	72–54	Israel
Scoring by half: 28–29, 44–25
Pts: Korac (27)		Pts: Klein (19)

31 May 1959
10:00

Italy	75–56	Israel
Scoring by half: 34–33, 41–23
Pts: Alesini (20)		Pts: Klein (19)

==== Group 2 (12th–14th Place) ====
Team	Pld	W	L	PF	PA	PD	Pts
Turkey	2	2	0	116	110	+6	4
Finland	2	1	1	117	111	+6	3
East Germany	2	0	2	102	114	+12	2

29 May 1959
16:00

Turkey	54–53	East Germany
Scoring by half: 31–29, 23–24
Pts: Büyükaycan (16)		Pts: Flau (14)

30 May 1959
10:00

East Germany	49–60	Finland
Scoring by half: 23–34, 26–26
Pts: Flau (17)		Pts: Lampén (31)

31 May 1959
16:30

Turkey	62–57	Finland
Scoring by half: 27–22, 35–35
Pts: Uyguç (17)		Pts: Kuusela (22)

==== Group 3 (15th–17th Place) ====
Team	Pld	W	L	PF	PA	PD	Pts
Spain	2	2	0	135	75	+60	4
Austria	2	1	1	93	113	−20	3
Iran	2	0	2	91	131	−40	2

29 May 1959
8:30

Spain	64–33	Austria
Scoring by half: 32–14, 32–19
Pts: Rodriguez (14)		Pts: Ledl (7)

30 May 1959
8:30

Austria	60–49	Iran
Scoring by half: 34–27, 26–22
Pts: Doppes (18)		Pts: Meshun (19)

31 May 1959
8:30

Spain	71–42	Iran
Scoring by half: 28–16, 43–26
Pts: Parra (20)		Pts: Vaizi (9)

=== Semi-final round ===
The Semi-Final round consisted of two round-robin groups, where the top two from each one advanced to the Final Round to decide the first four places in the final standings, and the remaining teams, the 5th–8th places.

==== Group 1 ====
Team	Pld	W	L	PF	PA	PD	Pts
Soviet Union	3	3	0	213	179	+34	6
Hungary	3	2	1	190	177	+13	5
Bulgaria	3	1	2	181	190	−9	4
Poland	3	0	3	172	210	−38	3

27 May 1959
16:00

Soviet Union	78–59	Poland
Scoring by half: 28–23, 50–36
Pts: Krouminch (18)		Pts: Wichowski (14)

27 May 1959
20:30

Bulgaria	52–67	Hungary
Scoring by half: 22–33, 30–34
Pts: Rashkov (11)		Pts: Simon (24)

28 May 1959
17:30

Hungary	63–56	Poland
Scoring by half: 29–32, 34–24
Pts: Gabanyi (22)		Pts: Wichowski (24)

28 May 1959
20:30

Soviet Union	66–60	Bulgaria
Scoring by half: 34–38, 32–22
Pts: Krouminch (28)		Pts: Mirchev (22)

29 May 1959
17:30

Bulgaria	69–57	Poland
Scoring by half: 33–29, 36–28
Pts: Ilov (20)		Pts: Wichowski (14)

29 May 1959
20:30

Hungary	60–69	Soviet Union
Scoring by half: 27–36, 33–33
Pts: Banhegyi (11)		Pts: Zubkov (22)

==== Group 2 ====
Team	Pld	W	L	PF	PA	PD	Pts
France	3	3	0	179	164	+15	6
Czechoslovakia	3	2	1	191	160	+31	5
Belgium	3	1	2	191	218	−27	4
Romania	3	0	3	187	206	−19	3

27 May 1959
10:00

Czechoslovakia	76–49	Belgium
Scoring by half: 45–31, 31–18
Pts: Tetiva (23)		Pts: Loridon (14)

27 May 1959
19:00

Romania	52–61	France
Scoring by half: 26–29, 26–32
Pts: Nedef (18)		Pts: Mayeur (16)

28 May 1959
16:00

Belgium	63–66	France
Scoring by half: 23–36, 40–30
Pts: Steveniers (22)		Pts: Dorigo (13)

28 May 1959
19:00

Romania	59–66	Czechoslovakia
Scoring by half: 33–31, 26–35
Pts: Novacek (20)		Pts: Tetiva (19)

29 May 1959
10:00

Romania	76–79 ()	Belgium
Scoring by half: 30–39, 40–31 Overtime: 6–9
Pts: Nedef (21)		Pts: Eygel (18)

29 May 1959
19:00

France	52–49	Czechoslovakia
Scoring by half: 20–26, 32–23
Pts: Dorigo (20)		Pts: Lukasik (11)

=== Final round ===
- Two groups of four teams determined the 1st–8th places. Results from matches between teams that shared a group in Semi-Final round were carried over to this round (i.e. Soviet Union vs. Hungary, France vs. Czechoslovakia, etc.).

==== Group 1 (1st–4th Place) ====
Team	Pld	W	L	PF	PA	PD	Pts
Soviet Union	3	3	0	240	204	+36	6
Czechoslovakia	3	1	2	192	196	−4	4
France	3	1	2	184	199	−15	4
Hungary	3	1	2	183	200	−17	4

30 May 1959
19:00

France	60–62	Hungary
Scoring by half: 24–36, 36–26
Pts: Mayeur (21)		Pts: Banhegyi (19)

30 May 1959
20:30

Soviet Union	83–72	Czechoslovakia
Scoring by half: 40–38, 43–34
Pts: Valdmanis (19)		Pts: Baumruk (19)

31 May 1959
18:00

Hungary	61–71	Czechoslovakia
Scoring by half: 21–32, 40–39
Pts: Bencze (10)		Pts: Baumruk (23)

31 May 1959
19:45

Soviet Union	88–72	France
Scoring by half: 37–30, 51–42
Pts: Krouminch (32)		Pts: Lefebvre (16)

==== Group 2 (5th–8th Place) ====
Team	Pld	W	L	PF	PA	PD	Pts
Bulgaria	3	3	0	194	158	+36	6
Poland	3	1	2	198	203	−5	5
Belgium	3	1	2	196	222	−26	4
Romania	3	1	2	194	199	−5	3

30 May 1959
16:00

Bulgaria	53–52	Romania
Scoring by half: 24–28, 29–24
Pts: Mirchev (10)		Pts: Novacek (19)

30 May 1959
17:30

Poland	74–68	Belgium
Scoring by half: 37–31, 37–37
Pts: Nartowski (14)		Pts: Steveniers (20)

31 May 1959
11:30

Poland	67–66	Romania
Scoring by half: 35–34, 32–32
Pts: Pawlak (17)		Pts: Novacek (29)

31 May 1959
15:00

Bulgaria	72–49	Belgium
Scoring by half: 34–31, 38–18
Pts: Radev (17)		Pts: Aerts (17)

1959 FIBA EuroBasket champions

Soviet Union
5th title

== Final standings ==
Rank	Team
1st place, gold medalist(s)	Soviet Union
2nd place, silver medalist(s)	Czechoslovakia
3rd place, bronze medalist(s)	France
4.	Hungary
5.	Bulgaria
6.	Poland
7.	Belgium
8.	Romania
9.	Yugoslavia
10.	Italy
11.	Israel
12.	Turkey
13.	Finland
14.	East Germany
15.	Spain
16.	Austria
17.	Iran

== Team rosters ==
1. Soviet Union: Jānis Krūmiņš, Gennadi Volnov, Maigonis Valdmanis, Valdis Muižnieks, Viktor Zubkov, Arkady Bochkarov, Yuri Korneev, Guram Minashvili, Mikhail Semyonov, Aleksandr Petrov, Vladimir Torban, Mikhail Studenetski (Coach: Stepan Spandaryan)

2. Czechoslovakia: Jiří Baumruk, František Konvička, Bohumil Tomášek, Miroslav Škeřík, Jaroslav Šíp, Boris Lukášik, Jaroslav Křivý, Dušan Lukášik, Zdeněk Rylich, Jiří Šťastný, Jaroslav Tetiva, Bohuslav Rylich (Coach: Gustáv Herrmann)

3. France: Henri Grange, Robert Monclar, Maxime Dorigo, Philippe Baillet, Christian Baltzer, Andre Chavet, Jerome Christ, Jean-Claude Lefebvre, Bernard Mayeur, Michel Rat, Lucien Sedat, Henri Villecourt (Coach: Robert Busnel)

4. Hungary: János Greminger, Tibor Zsíros, László Bánhegyi, Tibor Czinkán, László Gabányi, János Simon, János Bencze, Zoltán Judik, Ottó Temesvári, Miklós Boháty, Árpád Glatz, Merényi (Coach: János Páder)

9. Yugoslavia: Miodrag Nikolić, Marjan Kandus, Branko Radović, Slobodan Gordić, Igor Jelnikar, Matja Dermastija, Milutin Minja, Ivo Daneu, Nemanja Đurić, Radivoj Korać, Radovan Radović, Boris Kristančič (Coach: Aleksandar Nikolić)
