= EuroBasket 1963 =

International basketball event

Mistrzostwa Europy w Koszykówce Mężczyzn 1963

Tournament details
- Host country: Poland
- City: Wrocław
- Dates: 4–13 October
- Teams: 16
- Venue: 1 (in 1 host city)

Final positions
- Champions: Soviet Union (7th title)
- Runners-up: Poland
- Third place: Yugoslavia
- Fourth place: Hungary

Tournament statistics
- MVP: (Spain) Emiliano Rodríguez
- Top scorer: (Socialist Federal Republic of Yugoslavia) Radivoj Korać (26.4 points per game)

The 1963 FIBA European Championship, commonly called FIBA EuroBasket 1963, was the thirteenth FIBA EuroBasket regional basketball championship, held by FIBA Europe. Sixteen national teams affiliated with the International Basketball Federation (FIBA) entered the competition. The tournament was hosted by Poland, and held in Wrocław.

== First round ==
=== Group A ===
Pos	Team	Pld	W	L	PF	PA	PD	Pts	Qualification
1	Yugoslavia	7	7	0	608	472	+136	14	Qualified for the semifinals
2	Hungary	7	5	2	499	455	+44	10 (Note: Hungary–Bulgaria 64–55)	Qualified for the semifinals
3	Bulgaria	7	5	2	509	444	+65	10	Qualified for the 5th–8th place playoffs
4	Belgium	7	4	3	520	512	+8	8 (Note: Belgium–Italy 76–75)	Qualified for the 5th–8th place playoffs
5	Italy	7	4	3	477	459	+18	8	Qualified for the 9th–12th place playoffs
6	Israel	7	2	5	463	505	−42	4	Qualified for the 9th–12th place playoffs
7	Netherlands	7	1	6	453	588	−135	2	Qualified for the 13th–16th place playoffs
8	Turkey	7	0	7	405	499	−94	0	Qualified for the 13th–16th place playoffs

Source: FIBA Archives
Rules for classification: 1) Points; 2) Head-to-head results; 3) Points difference; 4) Points scored; 5) Drawing of lots.
Notes:

4 October 1963 Match 1	Yugoslavia	107–62	Netherlands	Wrocław
08:30	Scoring by half: 48–33, 59–29
		Boxscore		Arena: Hala Ludowa

4 October 1963 Match 2	Bulgaria	79–58	Israel	Wrocław
10:40	Scoring by half: 37–30, 42–28
		Boxscore		Arena: Hala Ludowa

4 October 1963 Match 3	Hungary	71–74(2OT)	Italy	Wrocław
17:00	Scoring by half: 29–25, 26–30, Overtime: 7–7, 9–12
		Boxscore		Arena: Hala Ludowa

4 October 1963 Match 4	Belgium	71–52	Turkey	Wrocław
21:30	Scoring by half: 31–31, 40–21
		Boxscore		Arena: Hala Ludowa

5 October 1963 Match 5	Netherlands	60–73	Italy	Wrocław
09:00	Scoring by half: 23–47, 37–26
		Boxscore		Arena: Hala Ludowa

5 October 1963 Match 6	Bulgaria	71–52	Turkey	Wrocław
13:30	Scoring by half: 34–25, 37–27
		Boxscore		Arena: Hala Ludowa

5 October 1963 Match 7	Hungary	71–69	Belgium	Wrocław
20:00	Scoring by half: 33–34, 38–35
		Boxscore		Arena: Hala Ludowa

5 October 1963 Match 8	Yugoslavia	80–73	Israel	Wrocław
21:30	Scoring by half: 44–31, 36–42
		Boxscore		Arena: Hala Ludowa

6 October 1963 Match 9	Netherlands	71–77	Belgium	Wrocław
09:00	Scoring by half: 35–33, 36–44
		Boxscore		Arena: Hala Ludowa

6 October 1963 Match 10	Israel	64–55	Turkey	Wrocław
11:40	Scoring by half: 30–32, 34–23
		Boxscore		Arena: Hala Ludowa

6 October 1963 Match 11	Bulgaria	55–64	Hungary	Wrocław
	Scoring by half: 26–33, 29–31
		Boxscore		Arena: Hala Ludowa

6 October 1963 Match 12	Yugoslavia	71–69	Italy	Wrocław
	Scoring by half: 37–32, 34–37
		Boxscore		Arena: Hala Ludowa

7 October 1963 Match 13	Yugoslavia	97–67	Turkey	Wrocław
09:00	Scoring by half: 50–33, 47–30
		Boxscore		Arena: Hala Ludowa

7 October 1963 Match 14	Italy	75–76	Belgium	Wrocław
10:20	Scoring by half: 39–46, 36–30
		Boxscore		Arena: Hala Ludowa

7 October 1963 Match 15	Netherlands	71–99	Bulgaria	Wrocław
11:40	Scoring by half: 32–46, 39–53
		Boxscore		Arena: Hala Ludowa

7 October 1963 Match 16	Israel	73–80	Hungary	Wrocław
20:00	Scoring by half: 38–35, 35–45
		Boxscore		Arena: Hala Ludowa

9 October 1963 Match 17	Turkey	42–50	Hungary	Wrocław
09:00	Scoring by half: 26–21, 16–29
		Boxscore		Arena: Hala Ludowa

9 October 1963 Match 18	Israel	70–55	Netherlands	Wrocław
10:20	Scoring by half: 26–26, 44–29
		Boxscore		Arena: Hala Ludowa

9 October 1963 Match 19	Italy	51–59	Bulgaria	Wrocław
20:00	Scoring by half: 22–33, 29–26
		Boxscore		Arena: Hala Ludowa

9 October 1963 Match 20	Yugoslavia	95–62	Belgium	Wrocław
21:30	Scoring by half: 48–37, 47–25
		Boxscore		Arena: Hala Ludowa

10 October 1963 Match 21	Belgium	72–80	Bulgaria	Wrocław
13:00	Scoring by half: 37–37, 35–43
		Boxscore		Arena: Hala Ludowa

10 October 1963 Match 22	Turkey	72–74	Netherlands	Wrocław
17:00	Scoring by half: 38–31, 34–43
		Boxscore		Arena: Hala Ludowa

10 October 1963 Match 23	Italy	63–57	Israel	Wrocław
20:00	Scoring by half: 28–28, 35–29
		Boxscore		Arena: Hala Ludowa

10 October 1963 Match 24	Yugoslavia	82–73	Hungary	Wrocław
21:30	Scoring by half: 44–35, 38–38
		Boxscore		Arena: Hala Ludowa

11 October 1963 Match 25	Hungary	90–60	Netherlands	Wrocław
11:40	Scoring by half: 48–33, 42–27
		Boxscore		Arena: Hala Ludowa

11 October 1963 Match 26	Turkey	65–72	Italy	Wrocław
13:00	Scoring by half: 37–34, 28–38
		Boxscore		Arena: Hala Ludowa

11 October 1963 Match 27	Belgium	93–68	Israel	Wrocław
17:00	Scoring by half: 50–35, 43–33
		Boxscore		Arena: Hala Ludowa

11 October 1963 Match 28	Yugoslavia	76–66	Bulgaria	Wrocław
21:30	Scoring by half: 36–23, 40–43
		Boxscore		Arena: Hala Ludowa

=== Group B ===
Pos	Team	Pld	W	L	PF	PA	PD	Pts	Qualification
1	Soviet Union	7	7	0	558	392	+166	14	Qualified for the semifinals
2	Poland	7	6	1	542	454	+88	12	Qualified for the semifinals
3	East Germany	7	4	3	468	469	−1	8	Qualified for the 5th–8th place playoffs
4	Spain	7	3	4	563	575	−12	6 (Note: Czechoslovakia–Spain 76–98)	Qualified for the 5th–8th place playoffs
5	Romania	7	3	4	422	430	−8	6 (Note: Romania-Spain 70-75)	Qualified for the 9th–12th place playoffs
6	Czechoslovakia	7	3	4	479	514	−35	6 (Note: Czechoslovakia-Romania 55-56)	Qualified for the 9th–12th place playoffs
7	France	7	1	6	427	521	−94	2 (Note: France-Finland 61-59)	Qualified for the 13th–16th place playoffs
8	Finland	7	1	6	399	503	−104	2	Qualified for the 13th–16th place playoffs

Source: FIBA Archives
Rules for classification: 1) Points; 2) Head-to-head results; 3) Points difference; 4) Points scored; 5) Drawing of lots.
Notes:

4 October 1963 Match 01	France	49–63	East Germany	Wrocław
09:20	Scoring by half: 24–35, 25–28
		Boxscore		Arena: Hala Ludowa

4 October 1963 Match 02	Soviet Union	75–63	Finland	Wrocław
12:00	Scoring by half: 38–23, 37–30
		Boxscore		Arena: Hala Ludowa

4 October 1963 Match 03	Spain	76–79	Poland	Wrocław
18:30	Scoring by half: 25–44, 51–35
		Boxscore		Arena: Hala Ludowa

4 October 1963 Match 04	Czechoslovakia	55–56	Romania	Wrocław
20:00	Scoring by half: 26–24, 29–32
		Boxscore		Arena: Hala Ludowa

5 October 1963 Match 05	France	72–79	Czechoslovakia	Wrocław
10:20	Scoring by half: 33–41, 39–38
		Boxscore		Arena: Hala Ludowa

5 October 1963 Match 06	Spain	75–70	Romania	Wrocław
11:40	Scoring by half: 34–44, 41–26
		Boxscore		Arena: Hala Ludowa

5 October 1963 Match 07	Finland	50–73	East Germany	Wrocław
17:00	Scoring by half: 26–33, 24–40
		Boxscore		Arena: Hala Ludowa

5 October 1963 Match 08	Soviet Union	64–54	Poland	Wrocław
18:30	Scoring by half: 30–20, 34–34
		Boxscore		Arena: Hala Ludowa

6 October 1963 Match 09	Finland	45–78	Czechoslovakia	Wrocław
10:20	Scoring by half: 20–33, 25–45
		Boxscore		Arena: Hala Ludowa

6 October 1963 Match 10	Soviet Union	76–52	East Germany	Wrocław
13:00	Scoring by half: 30–23, 46–29
		Boxscore		Arena: Hala Ludowa

6 October 1963 Match 11	Poland	64–60	Romania	Wrocław
20:00	Scoring by half: 30–34, 34–26
		Boxscore		Arena: Hala Ludowa

6 October 1963 Match 12	Spain	86–70	France	Wrocław
21:30	Scoring by half: 47–39, 39–31
		Boxscore		Arena: Hala Ludowa

7 October 1963 Match 13	Finland	83–79	Spain	Wrocław
13:00	Scoring by half: 43–44, 40–35
		Boxscore		Arena: Hala Ludowa

7 October 1963 Match 14	East Germany	61–62	Czechoslovakia	Wrocław
17:00	Scoring by half: 38–34, 23–28
		Boxscore		Arena: Hala Ludowa

7 October 1963 Match 15	Poland	98–65	France	Wrocław
18:30	Scoring by half: 46–35, 52–30
		Boxscore		Arena: Hala Ludowa

7 October 1963 Match 16	Soviet Union	64–54	Romania	Wrocław
21:30	Scoring by half: 36–28, 28–26
		Boxscore		Arena: Hala Ludowa

9 October 1963 Match 17	East Germany	91–85	Spain	Wrocław
11:40	Scoring by half: 37–43, 54–42
		Boxscore		Arena: Hala Ludowa

9 October 1963 Match 18	Romania	59–51	France	Wrocław
13:00	Scoring by half: 35–34, 24–17
		Boxscore		Arena: Hala Ludowa

9 October 1963 Match 19	Poland	68–54	<Finland	Wrocław
17:00	Scoring by half: 32–30, 36–24
		Boxscore		Arena: Hala Ludowa

9 October 1963 Match 20	Soviet Union	96–56	Czechoslovakia	Wrocław
18:30	Scoring by half: 49–25, 47–31
		Boxscore		Arena: Hala Ludowa

10 October 1963 Match 21	East Germany	62–93	Poland	Wrocław
09:00	Scoring by half: 23–47, 39–46
		Boxscore		Arena: Hala Ludowa

10 October 1963 Match 22	Romania	69–55	Finland	Wrocław
10:20	Scoring by half: 28–23, 41–32
		Boxscore		Arena: Hala Ludowa

10 October 1963 Match 23	Czechoslovakia	76–98	Spain	Wrocław
11:40	Scoring by half: 43–59, 33–39
		Boxscore		Arena: Hala Ludowa

11 October 1963 Match 24	Romania	54–66	East Germany	Wrocław
09:00	Scoring by half: 27–36, 27–30
		Boxscore		Arena: Hala Ludowa

11 October 1963 Match 25	France	61–59	Finland	Wrocław
10:20	Scoring by half: 26–25, 35–34
		Boxscore		Arena: Hala Ludowa

11 October 1963 Match 26	Soviet Union	77–59	France	Wrocław
18:30	Scoring by half: 42–34, 35–25
		Boxscore		Arena: Hala Ludowa

11 October 1963 Match 27	Czechoslovakia	73–86	Poland	Wrocław
18:30	Scoring by half: 33–40, 40–46
		Boxscore		Arena: Hala Ludowa

11 October 1963 Match 28	Soviet Union	106–64	Spain	Wrocław
20:00	Scoring by half: 49–29, 57–35
		Boxscore		Arena: Hala Ludowa

== Knockout stage ==
=== 13th–16th place playoffs ===
Classification Semifinals
Netherlands	58
Finland	71
France	80
Turkey	63

13th place match
France	60
Finland	50
15th place match
Turkey	64
Netherlands	62

=== 13th–16th place playoffs ===
12 October 1963
9:00

Boxscore

France	80–63	Turkey
Scoring by half: 37–26, 43–37

Hala Ludowa, Wrocław

12 October 1963
11:40

Boxscore

Netherlands	58–71	Finland
Scoring by half: 32–35, 26–36

Hala Ludowa, Wrocław

=== 15th place playoffs ===
13 October 1963
9:00

Boxscore

Turkey	64–62	Netherlands
Scoring by half: 34–32, 30–30

Hala Ludowa, Wrocław

=== 13th place playoffs ===
13 October 1963
10:20

Boxscore

France	60–50	Finland
Scoring by half: 26–30, 34–20

Hala Ludowa, Wrocław

=== 9th–12th place playoffs ===
Classification Semifinals
Italy	66
Czechoslovakia	70
Romania	47
Israel	57

9th place match
Czechoslovakia	58
Israel	60
11th place match
Italy	66
Romania	85

=== 9th-12th place playoffs ===
12 October 1963
10:20

Boxscore

Italy	66–70	Czechoslovakia
Scoring by half: 29–43, 37–27

Hala Ludowa, Wrocław

12 October 1963
21:30

Boxscore

Romania	47–57	Israel
Scoring by half: 23–34, 24–23

Hala Ludowa, Wrocław

=== 11th place playoffs ===
13 October 1963
9:00

Boxscore

Italy	66–85	Romania
Scoring by half: 30–34, 36–51

Hala Ludowa, Wrocław

=== 9th place playoffs ===
13 October 1963
11:40

Boxscore

Czechoslovakia	58–60	Israel
Scoring by half: 29–29, 29–31

Hala Ludowa, Wrocław

=== 5th–8th place playoffs ===
Classification Semifinals
Bulgaria	102
Spain	70
East Germany	81
Belgium	53

5th place match
East Germany	62
Bulgaria	77
7th place match
Belgium	83
Spain	86

=== 5th-8th place playoffs ===
12 October 1963
13:00

Boxscore

East Germany	81–53	Belgium
Scoring by half: 41–22, 40–31

Hala Ludowa, Wrocław

12 October 1963
17:00

Boxscore

Bulgaria	102–70	Spain
Scoring by half: 51–31, 51–39

Hala Ludowa, Wrocław

=== 7th place playoffs ===
13 October 1963
13:00

Boxscore

Belgium	83–86	Spain
Scoring by half: 35–47, 48–39

Hala Ludowa, Wrocław

=== 5th place playoffs ===
13 October 1963
11:40

Boxscore

East Germany	62–77	Bulgaria
Scoring by half: 29–40, 33–37

Hala Ludowa, Wrocław

== Final round ==
Semi-finals
Soviet Union	89
Hungary	51
Yugoslavia	72
Poland	83

Final
Soviet Union	61
Poland	45
Third place game
Yugoslavia	89
Hungary	61

=== Semifinals ===
12 October 1963
18:30

Boxscore

Yugoslavia	72–83	Poland
Scoring by half: 40–47, 32–36
Pts: Korać 29		Pts: Lopatka 18

Hala Ludowa, Wrocław

12 October 1963
20:00

Boxscore

Soviet Union	89–51	Hungary
Scoring by half: 38–27, 51–24
Pts: Volnov 27		Pts: Bencze 11

Hala Ludowa, Wrocław

=== Bronze medal match ===
13 October 1963
17:00

Boxscore

Yugoslavia	89–61	Hungary
Scoring by half: 38–39, 51–22
Pts: Korać 27		Pts: Simon 13

Hala Ludowa, Wrocław

=== Final ===
13 October 1963
18:30

Boxscore

Soviet Union	61–45	Poland
Scoring by half: 37–18, 24–27
Pts: Krūmiņš 17		Pts: Lopatka 11

Hala Ludowa, Wrocław

1963 FIBA EuroBasket champions

Soviet Union
7th title

== Final standings ==
1. Soviet Union
2. Poland
3. Yugoslavia
4. Hungary
5. Bulgaria
6. East Germany
7. Spain
8. Belgium
9. Israel
10. Czechoslovakia
11. Romania
12. Italy
13. France
14. Finland
15. Turkey
16. Netherlands

== Awards ==
1963 FIBA EuroBasket MVP: Emiliano Rodríguez ( Spain)

== Team rosters ==
1. Soviet Union: Jānis Krūmiņš, Gennadi Volnov, Jaak Lipso, Armenak Alachachian, Guram Minashvili, Tõnno Lepmets, Juris Kalnins, Aleksander Travin, Aleksander Petrov, Viacheslav Khrinin, Vadim Gladun, Olgerts Jurgensons (Coach: Alexander Gomelsky)

2. Poland: Mieczysław Łopatka, Bohdan Likszo, Janusz Wichowski, Andrzej Pstrokonski, Leszek Arent, Zbigniew Dregier, Kazimierz Frelkiewicz, Wieslaw Langiewicz, Andrzej Nartowski, Stanislaw Olejniczak, Jerzy Piskun, Krzysztof Sitkowski (Coach: Witold Zagórski)

3. Yugoslavia: Radivoj Korać, Ivo Daneu, Trajko Rajković, Slobodan Gordić, Borut Bassin, Nemanja Đurić, Miodrag Nikolić, Miloš Bojović, Živko Kasun, Emil Logar, Zvonko Petričević, Dragoslav Ražnatović (Coach: Aleksandar Nikolić)

4. Hungary: János Greminger, Laszlo Gabanyi, János Simon, Janos Bencze, Miklos Bohaty, Gyorgy Polik, Gyorgy Vajdovics, Jozsef Prieszol, Arpad Glatz, Tibor Kangyal, Otto Temesvari, Pal Koczka (Coach: Tibor Zsiros)
