= EuroBasket 1957 =

International basketball event

Евробаскет 1957

Tournament details
- Host country: Bulgaria
- City: Sofia
- Dates: 20–30 June
- Teams: 16
- Venue: 1 (in 1 host city)

Final positions
- Champions: Soviet Union (4th title)
- Runners-up: Bulgaria
- Third place: Czechoslovakia
- Fourth place: Hungary

Tournament statistics
- MVP: (Czechoslovakia) Jiří Baumruk
- Top scorer: (Belgium) Eddy Terrace (24.4 points per game)

The 1957 FIBA European Championship, commonly called FIBA EuroBasket 1957, was the tenth FIBA EuroBasket regional basketball championship, held by FIBA Europe. Sixteen national teams affiliated with the International Basketball Federation (FIBA) entered the competition. The competition was hosted by Bulgaria. Vasil Levski National Stadium in Sofia was the location of the event.

== Results ==
=== Preliminary round ===
In the preliminary round, the 16 teams were split up into four groups of four teams each. The top two teams in each group advanced to the final round to play for the first 8 places, while the bottom two were sent to the classification round to play for 9th through 16th.

==== Group A ====
Rank	Team	Pts	W	L	PF	PA	Diff
1.	Czechoslovakia	6	3	0	273	142	+131
2.	Yugoslavia	5	2	1	244	175	+69
3.	Scotland	4	1	2	148	259	−111
4.	Albania	3	0	3	136	225	−89

Czechoslovakia	123 – 44	Scotland
Albania	57 – 89	Yugoslavia
Yugoslavia	94 – 39	Scotland
Czechoslovakia	71 – 37	Albania
Scotland	65 – 42	Albania
Czechoslovakia	79 – 61	Yugoslavia

==== Group B ====
Rank	Team	Pts	W	L	PF	PA	Diff
1.	Soviet Union	6	3	0	270	158	+112
2.	Poland	5	2	1	188	171	+17
3.	Turkey	4	1	2	179	192	−13
4.	Austria	3	0	3	133	249	−116

Soviet Union	107 – 38	Austria
Poland	55 – 50	Turkey
Turkey	80 – 57	Austria
Soviet Union	83 – 71	Poland
Austria	38 – 62	Poland
Soviet Union	80 – 49	Turkey

==== Group C ====
Rank	Team	Pts	W	L	PF	PA	Diff
1.	Bulgaria	6	3	0	239	155	+84
2.	France	5	2	1	196	165	+31
3.	Italy	4	1	2	177	185	−8
4.	West Germany	3	0	3	149	256	−107

Bulgaria	67 – 52	France
West Germany	52 – 73	Italy
Bulgaria	72 – 45	Italy
France	83 – 39	West Germany
Italy	59 – 61	France
Bulgaria	100 – 58	West Germany

==== Group D ====
Rank	Team	Pts	W	L	PF	PA	Diff
1.	Hungary	6	3	0	200	154	+46
2.	Romania	5	2	1	205	183	+22
3.	Finland	4	1	2	187	207	−20
4.	Belgium	3	0	3	169	217	−48

Hungary	66 – 65	Romania
Finland	76 – 74	Belgium
Hungary	50 – 39	Finland
Belgium	45 – 57	Romania
Romania	83 – 72	Finland
Hungary	84 – 50	Belgium

=== Classification round ===
For the first time, the classification round, like the final round, was played as an 8-team round robin, with no further playoffs.

Rank	Team	Pts	W	L	PF	PA	Diff
9.	Turkey	14	7	0	525	364	+161
10.	Italy	13	6	1	500	350	+150
11.	Finland	12	5	2	499	435	+64
12.	Belgium	11	4	3	473	461	+12
13.	West Germany	10	3	4	342	364	−22
14.	Austria	9	2	5	342	364	−22
15.	Scotland	8	1	6	368	492	−124
16.	Albania	7	0	7	340	559	−219

Italy	91 – 50	Belgium
Finland	61 – 47	West Germany
Scotland	69 – 56	Albania
Turkey	59 – 42	Austria

Turkey	83 – 70	Belgium
Finland	53 – 51	Austria
West Germany	72 – 43	Albania
Scotland	47 – 91	Italy

West Germany	37 – 57	Italy
Turkey	100 – 54	Scotland
Austria	58 – 70	Belgium
Finland	91 – 42	Albania

Finland	84 – 67	Belgium
Austria	48 – 47	Scotland
Albania	42 – 82	Italy
West Germany	33 – 54	Turkey

Finland	87 – 97	Italy
Albania	64 – 97	Turkey
Austria	55 – 58	West Germany
Belgium	76 – 51	Scotland

Turkey	57 – 50	Italy
Belgium	50 – 46	West Germany
Finland	72 – 56	Scotland
Albania	45 – 58	Austria

Finland	51 – 75	Turkey
Belgium	90 – 48	Albania
Italy	32 – 30	Austria
Scotland	44 – 49	West Germany

=== Final round ===
The final round was played as an 8-team round robin, with no further playoffs.

Rank	Team	Pts	W	L	PF	PA	Diff
1.	Soviet Union	14	7	0	537	409	+128
2.	Bulgaria	13	6	1	510	456	+54
3.	Czechoslovakia	12	5	2	505	458	+47
4.	Hungary	11	4	3	480	433	+47
5.	Romania	10	3	4	440	462	−22
6.	Yugoslavia	9	2	5	476	584	−108
7.	Poland	8	1	6	456	518	−62
8.	France	7	0	7	417	501	−84

France	53 – 83	Soviet Union
Czechoslovakia	65 – 62	Hungary
Poland	66 – 70	Romania
Bulgaria	99 – 76	Yugoslavia

Yugoslavia was the first of the pool leaders to take a loss in the final round, playing against Bulgaria, who had won their division.

Poland	63 – 77	Hungary
France	45 – 65	Romania
Soviet Union	97 – 61	Yugoslavia
Bulgaria	82 – 80	Czechoslovakia

Bulgaria continued to oust division leaders, knocking Czechoslovakia out of the undefeated group. Romania and the Soviet Union each defeated their second opponents, joining Bulgaria at the top of the pool.

Poland	69 – 74	Bulgaria
Romania	61 – 76	Hungary
France	72 – 75	Yugoslavia
Soviet Union	62 – 60	Czechoslovakia

The Soviet team pulled off a close win over the Czechoslovak team that had broken the Soviets' lossless European championship start at 32 games. Romania lost a rematch with preliminary round opponent Hungary, as those two teams went to 2–1 behind the Soviets and Bulgarians, who had each maintained perfect records in their first three games.

Yugoslavia	74 – 95	Czechoslovakia
France	58 – 81	Hungary
Soviet Union	86 – 64	Poland
Romania	54 – 67	Bulgaria

Bulgaria and the Soviet Union each won their 7th game of the tournament and 4th of the final round, improving to 4–0. Hungary stayed close behind, at 3–1, with Romania and Czechoslovakia staying in contention at 2–2.

Yugoslavia	69 – 68	Poland
Romania	63 – 87	Soviet Union
France	62 – 64	Czechoslovakia
Hungary	52 – 63	Bulgaria

The Soviets and Bulgarians remained undefeated as Hungary, falling to Bulgaria, dropped to 2 games behind them at 3–2 along with Czechoslovakia.

France	65 – 68	Bulgaria
Czechoslovakia	80 – 61	Poland
Yugoslavia	60 – 72	Romania
Hungary	51 – 62	Soviet Union

Improving to 6–0 each, the Soviet Union and Bulgaria set up a match between the two of them that would determine the championship in the seventh and final game of the round.

Hungary	81 – 61	Yugoslavia
Czechoslovakia	61 – 55	Romania
France	62 – 65	Poland
Bulgaria	57 – 60	Soviet Union

The Soviet Union trailed by 4 points at halftime in their decisive game against Bulgaria. The second half saw an explosion of scoring, with the Soviets adding 41 points in the frame to the 19 they had in the first half. Bulgaria wasn't able to maintain the pace, scoring only 34 in the second half to fall to the Soviets 60–57. Poland picked up their first win of the final round, defeating France, who fell to 0–7.

1957 FIBA EuroBasket champions

Soviet Union
4th title

== Final standings ==
1. Soviet Union
2. Bulgaria
3. Czechoslovakia
4. Hungary
5. Romania
6. Yugoslavia
7. Poland
8. France
9. Turkey
10. Italy
11. Finland
12. Belgium
13. West Germany
14. Austria
15. Scotland
16. Albania

== Team rosters ==
1. Soviet Union: Viktor Zubkov, Valdis Muižnieks, Maigonis Valdmanis, Guram Minashvili, Yuri Ozerov, Mikhail Semyonov, Arkady Bochkarov, Stasys Stonkus, Vladimir Torban, Algirdas Lauritėnas, Mart Laga, Mikhail Studenetski (Coach: Stepan Spandaryan)

2. Bulgaria: Viktor Radev, Georgi Panov, Ilija Mirchev, Ljubomir Panov, Cvjatko Barchovski, Petko Lazarov, Mikhail Semov, Georgi Kanev, Vladimir Ganchev, Metodi Tomovski, Konstantin Totev, Atanas Pejchinski (Coach: Ljudmil Katerinski)

3. Czechoslovakia: Jiří Baumruk, Zdeněk Bobrovský, Miroslav Škeřík, Jaroslav Šíp, Dušan Lukášik, Zdeněk Rylich, Jaroslav Tetiva, Luboš Kolář, Milan Merkl, Jiří Tetiva, Jaroslav Chocholáč, Nikolaj Ordnung (Coach: Gustáv Herrmann)

4. Hungary: János Greminger, László Tóth, Tibor Zsíros, László Bánhegyi, János Bencze, János Simon, László Gabányi, Tibor Czinkán, István Sahin-Tóth, Ervin Keszey, Zoltán Judik, Pál Borbély, István Liptai (Coach: Zoltán Csányi)

6. Yugoslavia: Miodrag Nikolić, Marjan Kandus, Branko Radović, Lajos Engler, Ljubomir Katić, Milutin Minja, Ivo Daneu, Branko Miletić, Bogdan Müller, Vilmos Lóczi, Boris Kristančič, Matija Dermastia (Coach: Aleksandar Nikolić)
