= Hungarian Basketball Federation =

Governing body of basketball in Hungary

- Sport: Basketball
- Jurisdiction: Hungary
- Abbreviation: MKOSZ
- Founded: 15 November 1942; 83 years ago
- Headquarters: Budapest
- President: Márton Báder

Official website
- www.hunbasket.hu

The Hungarian Basketball Federation (Hungarian: Magyar Kosárlabdázók Országos Szövetsége, pronounced [ˈmɒɟɒr ˈkoʃaːrlɒbdaːzoːk ˈorsaːɡoʃ ˈsøvɛt͡ʃːeːɡɛ], MKOSZ) is the governing body of basketball in Hungary.

It is a member of the International Basketball Federation (FIBA).

== Hosted tournaments ==
Men's

- EuroBasket 1955, 7–19 June 1955
- 1992 FIBA Europe Under-18 Championship, 16–23 August 1992
- 1987 FIBA Europe Under-16 Championship, Székesfehérvár & Kaposvár, 8–15 August 1992

Women's

- EuroBasket Women 1950, 14–20 May 1950
- EuroBasket Women 1964, 6–13 September 1964
- EuroBasket Women 1983, 11–18 September 1983
- EuroBasket Women 1997, 6–15 June 1997
- EuroBasket Women 2015 (with Romania), 11–28 June 2015
- 2006 FIBA Europe Under-20 Championship for Women, Sopron
- 2012 FIBA Europe Under-20 Championship for Women, Debrecen, 16–26 August 2012
- 1981 FIBA Europe Under-18 Championship for Women, Eger & Kecskemét
- 2005 FIBA Europe Under-18 Championship for Women, Budapest
- 2016 FIBA Europe Under-18 Championship for Women, Sopron, 23–31 July 2016
- 1980 FIBA Europe Under-16 Championship for Women, Zalaegerszeg & Pécs, 6–15 August 1980
- 1997 FIBA Europe Under-16 Championship for Women, Sopron
- 2012 FIBA Europe Under-16 Championship for Women, Miskolc, 12–22 July 2012
- 2014 FIBA Europe Under-16 Championship for Women, Debrecen, 31 July–10 August 2014

== Honours ==
Men's

- European Championship: Winner (1 time - 1955); Runner-up (1 time - 1953); Third place (1 time - 1946)
- Universiade: Bronze medal - 1965

Women's

- European Championship: Runner-up (2 times - 1950, 1956); Third place (5 times - 1952, 1983, 1985, 1987, 1991)
- Universiade: Bronze medal - 1965

== Divisions ==
Men's

- Hungary national basketball team
- Hungary national under-20 basketball team
- Hungary national under-18 basketball team
- Hungary national under-16 basketball team
- Hungary national 3x3 team

Women's

- Hungary women's national basketball team
- Hungary women's national under-20 basketball team
- Hungary women's national under-18 basketball team
- Hungary women's national under-16 basketball team
- Hungary women's national 3x3 team

=== Current head coaches ===
As of 21 July 2016

Men's Team	Name
National team	(Montenegro) Stojan Ivković
Under-20 team	(Hungary) Sándor Teszler dr.
Under-18 team	(Hungary) Ákos Bokor
Under-16 team	(Hungary) Roland Halm

Women's Team	Name
National team	(Czech Republic) Štefan Svitek
Under-20 team	(Hungary) Zalán Mészáros
Under-18 team	(Hungary) András Fűzy
Under-16 team	(Hungary) Jánosné Szabari

== Competitions ==
Magyar Kosárlabda Szövetség is responsible for organising the following competitions:

=== Men's basketball ===
- Nemzeti Bajnokság I/A (Tier 1)
- Nemzeti Bajnokság I/B (Tier 2) – two sections (East, West)
- Nemzeti Bajnokság II (Tier 3) – four sections (East, Central A, Central B, West)

=== Women's basketball ===
- Nemzeti Bajnokság I/A (women) (Tier 1)
- Nemzeti Bajnokság I/B (women) (Tier 2) – two sections (East, West)

=== Cups ===
- Magyar Kupa – Men
- Hepp-kupa
- Magyar Kupa (women) – Women
- Hepp-kupa (women)

== Presidents ==
- Ferenc Szalay (2010–2023)
- Márton Báder (2023-)

== See also ==
- Hungarian basketball league system
