= EuroBasket 1955 =

International basketball event

1955-ös férfi kosárlabda-Európa-bajnokság

Tournament details
- Host country: Hungary
- City: Budapest
- Dates: 7–19 June
- Teams: 18
- Venue: 1 (in 1 host city)

Final positions
- Champions: Hungary (1st title)
- Runners-up: Czechoslovakia
- Third place: Soviet Union
- Fourth place: Bulgaria

Tournament statistics
- MVP: (Hungary) János Greminger
- Top scorer: (Czechoslovakia) Miroslav Škeřík (19.1 points per game)

The 1955 FIBA European Championship, commonly called FIBA EuroBasket 1955, was the ninth FIBA EuroBasket regional basketball championship, held by FIBA Europe. Eighteen national teams affiliated with the International Basketball Federation (FIBA) entered the competition. The competition was hosted by Hungary, silver medal winners of EuroBasket 1953. Budapest was the location of the event.

== Results ==
=== First round ===
In the preliminary round, the 18 teams were split up into four groups. Two of the groups had five teams each, with the other two having four each. The top two teams in each group advanced to the final round, while the other ten teams were relegated to classification play.

==== Group A ====
| Rank | Team | Pts | W | L | PF | PA | Diff |
|---|---|---|---|---|---|---|---|
| 1. | Poland | 8 | 4 | 0 | 346 | 213 | +133 |
| 2. | Yugoslavia | 7 | 3 | 1 | 270 | 220 | +50 |
| 3. | France | 6 | 2 | 2 | 261 | 203 | +58 |
| 4. | Austria | 5 | 1 | 3 | 236 | 268 | −32 |
| 5. | England | 4 | 0 | 4 | 195 | 404 | −209 |

| France | 72 – 56 | Austria |
| Poland | 69 – 64 | Yugoslavia |
| Poland | 80 – 50 | Austria |
| England | 50 – 97 | France |
| England | 44 – 140 | Poland |
| Yugoslavia | 68 – 61 OT | Austria |
| Yugoslavia | 98 – 53 | England |
| France | 55 – 57 | Poland |
| Austria | 69 – 48 | England |
| France | 37 – 40 | Yugoslavia |

==== Group B ====
| Rank | Team | Pts | W | L | PF | PA | Diff |
|---|---|---|---|---|---|---|---|
| 1. | Hungary | 6 | 3 | 0 | 235 | 171 | +64 |
| 2. | Italy | 5 | 2 | 1 | 232 | 197 | +35 |
| 3. | Turkey | 4 | 1 | 2 | 201 | 218 | −17 |
| 4. | Finland | 3 | 0 | 3 | 183 | 265 | −82 |

| Italy | 86 – 63 | Turkey |
| Hungary | 94 – 58 | Finland |
| Finland | 66 – 83 | Turkey |
| Hungary | 75 – 58 | Italy |
| Italy | 88 – 59 | Finland |
| Turkey | 55 – 66 | Hungary |

==== Group C ====
| Rank | Team | Pts | W | L | PF | PA | Diff |
|---|---|---|---|---|---|---|---|
| 1. | Soviet Union | 8 | 4 | 0 | 372 | 179 | +193 |
| 2. | Romania | 7 | 3 | 1 | 280 | 210 | +70 |
| 3. | Switzerland | 6 | 2 | 2 | 233 | 252 | −19 |
| 4. | Sweden | 5 | 1 | 3 | 189 | 314 | −125 |
| 5. | Luxembourg | 4 | 0 | 4 | 179 | 298 | −119 |

| Sweden | 52 – 72 | Switzerland |
| Luxembourg | 36 – 103 | Soviet Union |
| Sweden | 54 – 53 | Luxembourg |
| Romania | 63 – 79 | Soviet Union |
| Switzerland | 73 – 50 | Luxembourg |
| Romania | 86 – 52 | Sweden |
| Soviet Union | 103 – 31 | Sweden |
| Switzerland | 39 – 63 | Romania |
| Romania | 68 – 40 | Luxembourg |
| Soviet Union | 87 – 49 | Switzerland |

==== Group D ====
| Rank | Team | Pts | W | L | PF | PA | Diff |
|---|---|---|---|---|---|---|---|
| 1. | Czechoslovakia | 6 | 3 | 0 | 286 | 161 | +125 |
| 2. | Bulgaria | 5 | 2 | 1 | 272 | 160 | +112 |
| 3. | West Germany | 4 | 1 | 2 | 171 | 246 | −75 |
| 4. | Denmark | 3 | 0 | 3 | 97 | 259 | −162 |

| Bulgaria | 107 – 33 | Denmark |
| West Germany | 65 – 113 | Czechoslovakia |
| Bulgaria | 97 – 54 | West Germany |
| Czechoslovakia | 100 – 28 | Denmark |
| Denmark | 36 – 52 | West Germany |
| Czechoslovakia | 73 – 68 | Bulgaria |

=== Classification round 1 ===
The first classification round was played in two round-robin groups. Teams advanced into the second classification round depending on their results in the first round—first and second place teams played in the 9–12 segment of classification round 2 while third and fourth place teams played for 13th to 16th places. The fifth place teams played one game against each other for 17th and 18th places.

==== Group 1 ====
| Rank | Team | Pts | W | L | PF | PA | Diff |
|---|---|---|---|---|---|---|---|
| 1. | Finland | 8 | 4 | 0 | 279 | 203 | +76 |
| 2. | England | 6 | 2 | 2 | 220 | 262 | −42 |
| 3. | Switzerland | 6 | 2 | 2 | 194 | 199 | −5 |
| 4. | Austria | 5 | 1 | 3 | 184 | 213 | −29 |
| 5. | West Germany | 5 | 1 | 3 | 196 | 196 | 0 |

| West Germany | 67 – 50 | England |
| Finland | 55 – 49 | Austria |
| West Germany | 53 – 65 | Finland |
| Switzerland | 65 – 41 | Austria |
| England | 60 – 94 | Finland |
| Switzerland | 35 – 34 | West Germany |
| England | 59 – 53 | Switzerland |
| Austria | 46 – 42 | West Germany |
| Austria | 48 – 51 | England |
| Finland | 65 – 41 | Switzerland |

==== Group 2 ====
| Rank | Team | Pts | W | L | PF | PA | Diff |
|---|---|---|---|---|---|---|---|
| 1. | France | 8 | 4 | 0 | 314 | 130 | +184 |
| 2. | Turkey | 7 | 3 | 1 | 279 | 188 | +91 |
| 3. | Luxembourg | 6 | 2 | 2 | 200 | 246 | −46 |
| 4. | Sweden | 5 | 1 | 3 | 192 | 277 | −85 |
| 5. | Denmark | 4 | 0 | 4 | 131 | 275 | −144 |

| Turkey | 72 – 59 | Luxembourg |
| Denmark | 41 – 51 | Sweden |
| France | 84 – 36 | Sweden |
| Turkey | 82 – 33 | Denmark |
| Luxembourg | 46 – 31 | Denmark |
| France | 50 – 38 | Turkey |
| Sweden | 46 – 87 | Turkey |
| Luxembourg | 30 – 84 | France |
| Sweden | 59 – 65 | Luxembourg |
| Denmark | 26 – 96 | France |

=== Classification round 2 ===
==== Classification 17/18 ====
| West Germany | 51 – 49 | Denmark |

==== Classification 13–16 ====
| Luxembourg | 55 – 80 | Austria |
| Switzerland | 54 – 43 | Sweden |

===== Classification 15/16 =====
| Luxembourg | 56 – 52 | Sweden |

===== Classification 13/14 =====
| Austria | 52 – 47 | Switzerland |

==== Classification 9–12 ====
| France | 103 – 55 | England |
| Finland | 55 – 54 | Turkey |

===== Classification 11/12 =====
| Turkey | 77 – 54 | England |

===== Classification 9/10 =====
| Finland | 48 – 65 | France |

=== Final round ===
The final round was played as an 8-team round robin, with no further playoffs.

| Rank | Team | Pts | W | L | PF | PA | Diff |
|---|---|---|---|---|---|---|---|
| 1. | Hungary | 13 | 6 | 1 | 514 | 427 | +87 |
| 2. | Czechoslovakia | 12 | 5 | 2 | 533 | 447 | +86 |
| 3. | Soviet Union | 12 | 5 | 2 | 538 | 467 | +71 |
| 4. | Bulgaria | 11 | 4 | 3 | 483 | 465 | +18 |
| 5. | Poland | 10 | 3 | 4 | 461 | 516 | −55 |
| 6. | Italy | 9 | 2 | 5 | 434 | 510 | −76 |
| 7. | Romania | 9 | 2 | 5 | 473 | 516 | −43 |
| 8. | Yugoslavia | 8 | 1 | 6 | 397 | 485 | −88 |

| Poland | 56 – 69 | Romania |
| Bulgaria | 84 – 66 | Yugoslavia |
| Hungary | 65 – 75 | Czechoslovakia |
| Italy | 48 – 54 | Soviet Union |

| Czechoslovakia | 49 – 52 | Yugoslavia |
| Romania | 70 – 73 OT | Italy |
| Soviet Union | 82 – 62 | Bulgaria |
| Hungary | 98 – 66 | Poland |

After two rounds of the round robin, the Soviet Union was the only team still undefeated. Poland had lost both of their games, and the other six teams were 1–1.

| Bulgaria | 73 – 46 | Romania |
| Italy | 65 – 81 | Hungary |
| Poland | 72 – 68 | Czechoslovakia |
| Yugoslavia | 52 – 75 | Soviet Union |

The Soviet team remained undefeated with an easy win over Yugoslavia, while Bulgaria and Hungary followed closely at 2–1 as the other 5 teams trailed at 1–2.

| Romania | 93 – 68 | Yugoslavia |
| Czechoslovakia | 81 – 74 | Soviet Union |
| Hungary | 69 – 59 | Bulgaria |
| Poland | 67 – 59 | Italy |

Ending the Soviet Union's undefeated streak that had spanned 32 games and was into its 4th tournament, Czechoslovakia won 81–74 to bump the Soviet Union to 3–1, tied with a Hungarian team it had yet to face in direct competition in the final round.

| Bulgaria | 62 – 57 | Poland |
| Yugoslavia | 34 – 48 | Hungary |
| Italy | 48 – 96 | Czechoslovakia |
| Soviet Union | 84 – 66 | Romania |

The Soviet Union and Hungary each won their fifth-round games, moving up to 4–1 apiece with two games left. The sixth round would pit the two against each other, however, so the tie for the lead of the group was about to be broken. Bulgaria and Czechoslovakia remained close behind at 3–2, followed by Romania and Poland at 2–3. Yugoslavia and Italy brought up the rear with 1–4 records.

| Poland | 67 – 59 | Yugoslavia |
| Czechoslovakia | 91 – 69 | Romania |
| Soviet Union | 68 – 82 | Hungary |
| Italy | 72 – 76 | Bulgaria |

The host Hungarian team dealt the Soviet Union its second loss in Eurobasket history. The Soviets were for the first time no longer in control of their own destiny — the Hungarians had taken lead of the group and the Soviets could not directly take it back. They were now in a three-way tie for second place with Bulgaria and Czechoslovakia.

| Yugoslavia | 66 – 69 | Italy |
| Soviet Union | 101 – 76 | Poland |
| Bulgaria | 67 – 73 | Czechoslovakia |
| Hungary | 71 – 60 | Romania |

Hungary's defeat of Romania clinched the gold medal for the hosts, who were the only 6–1 team in the final round. The Soviets and Czechoslovakia both finished at 5–2, with Czechoslovakia taking the silver medal and the Soviet Union, three-time gold medal winners, finished with a bronze medal.

1955 FIBA EuroBasket champions

Hungary
1st title

== Final standings ==
1. Hungary
2. Czechoslovakia
3. Soviet Union
4. Bulgaria
5. Poland
6. Italy
7. Romania
8. Yugoslavia
9. France
10. Finland
11. Turkey
12. England
13. Austria
14. Switzerland
15. Luxembourg
16. Sweden
17. West Germany
18. Denmark

== Team rosters ==
1. Hungary: János Greminger, Tibor Mezőfi, László Tóth, Tibor Zsíros, László Bánhegyi, János Hódi, László Hódi, Pál Bogár, Péter Papp, János Simon, Tibor Czinkán, Tibor Cselkó, Tibor Rémay, János Dallos, János Bencze (Coach: János Páder)

2. Czechoslovakia: Ivan Mrázek, Jiří Baumruk, Zdeněk Bobrovský, Miroslav Škeřík, Jan Kozák, Jaroslav Šíp, Radoslav Sís, Zdeněk Rylich, Dušan Lukašik, Jaroslav Tetiva, Luboš Kolář, Jiří Matoušek, Milan Merkl, Eugen Horniak (Coach: Josef Fleischlinger)

3. Soviet Union: Otar Korkia, Anatoly Konev, Aleksandr Moiseyev, Mikhail Semyonov, Arkady Bochkaryov, Yuri Ozerov, Kazys Petkevičius, Algirdas Lauritėnas, Gunārs Siliņš, Vladimir Torban, Viktor Vlasov, Stasys Stonkus, Mart Laga, Lev Reshetnikov (Coach: Konstantin Travin)

4. Bulgaria: Georgi Panov, Viktor Radev, Ilija Mirchev, Vladimir Ganchev, Konstantin Totev, Tsvjatko Barchovski, Gencho Rashkov, Metodi Tomovski, Vasil Manchenko, Emanuil Gjaurov, Anton Kuzov, Todor Rajkov, Ljubomir Panov, Bobev (Coach: Bozhidar Takev)

5. Poland: Jędrzej Bednarowicz, Mieczysław Fęglerski, Leszek Kamiński, Jerzy Młynarczyk, Andrzej Nartowski, Ryszard Olszewski, Tadeusz Pacuła, Władysław Pawlak, Bohdan Przywarski, Jerzy Sterenga, Wincenty Wawro, Stefan Wójcik, Witold Zagórski, Sławomir Złotek-Złotkiewicz (Coach: Władysław Maleszewski)

8. Yugoslavia: Bogdan Müller, Milutin Minja, Milan Bjegojević, Đorđe Andrijašević, Ladislav Demšar, Obren Popović, Đorđe Konjović, Jože Zupančič, Aleksandar Blašković, Ljubomir Katić, Vilmos Lóczi, Borislav Ćurčić (Coach: Aleksandar Nikolić)
