= Budapesti Honvéd SE (men's basketball) =

Budapesti Honvéd
- Leagues: Nemzeti Bajnokság I/A
- Founded: 1950
- History: Budapesti Honvéd SE (1950–1992, 1999–); Tungsram-Honvéd BT (1992–1994); Danone-Honvéd BT (1994–1999)
- Arena: Ludovika Aréna
- Capacity: 1350
- Location: Budapest, Hungary
- Team colors: red and white
- President: István Gergely
- Team manager: Márton Báder
- Head coach: Szabolcs Baksa
- Championships: 33 Hungarian Championships; 17 Hungarian Cups
- Website: honved.hu/kosarlabda
Home	Away

Budapesti Honvéd SE is a professional basketball club based in Budapest, Hungary. With 33 Hungarian Championships and 17 Hungarian Cups won from the 1950s to the 1990s, it is the most successful team in the Hungarian national basketball league. The club was relegated from the 1st division in 2001, but continued as an amateur club in the 3rd division. Between 2004 and 2022 they played in the 2nd division.

== History ==
The team was founded in 1950. In their first season they finished 3rd (with equal points as the champions, MAFC, and the runner-up, Vasas). Over the following 18 seasons they won 17 championships (in 1956 they finished unbeaten as runner-up because of the Hungarian Revolution of 1956).

From 1951 to 1960 they lost only one match, going unbeaten from 18 October 1954 to 6 October 1960. Between 1970 and 1975 they won two more championships, but between 1976 and 1986 they dominated again, winning every championship during this period.

In the next 6 seasons they finished once as runner-up and twice in 3rd place. In 1992, the third-placed team Budapesti Honvéd merged with the fourth-placed team Tungsram and they once again dominated the championship: in the next five seasons they won four championships (two as Danone Honvéd for sponsorship reasons).

In 1998 they finished as the last Budapest-based club to win a medal in the Hungarian basketball league. In 1999 and 2000 they finished in 10th place. In 2001 they finished 11th in the regular season.

Subsequently they were relegated to the playout. In the FIBA European Champions Cup they finished 3rd in 1958 and played in the quarter-finals in 1958–59. Thereafter they were less successful. Five Honvéd-players were on the runner-up national team in the EuroBasket 1953 and on the winning team in the EuroBasket 1955.

== Honors ==
- Hungarian Championship: 33
  - Winners: 1952, 1953, 1954, 1955, 1957, 1957–58, 1958–59, 1959–60, 1960–61, 1961–62, 1962–63, 1964, 1965, 1966, 1967, 1968, 1969, 1971, 1974, 1976, 1977, 1978, 1979, 1980–81, 1981–82, 1982–83, 1983–84, 1984–85, 1985–86, 1992–93, 1993–94, 1994–95, 1996–97.
  - Runners-up: 1956, 1970, 1972, 1975, 1986–87, 1995–96, 1997–98.
  - 3rd place: 1951, 1988–89, 1991–92.
- Hungarian Cup: 17
  - Winners: 1953, 1954, 1955, 1962, 1963, 1964, 1966, 1967, 1968, 1973, 1977, 1978, 1982, 1983, 1986, 1989, 1991.
  - Runners-up: 1965, 1970, 1972, 1975, 1976, 1985, 1990, 1996, 1997.
  - 3rd place: 1952, 1969, 1974, 1979, 1984, 1988, 1992, 1995.

== Current players ==
Note: Flags indicate national team eligibility at FIBA-sanctioned events. Players may hold other non-FIBA nationalities not displayed.

Budapest Honvéd roster
Players
Coaches

Pos.	No.	Nat.	Name	Ht.	Age
F	1	(Hungary)	Demeter, Attila	1.98 m (6 ft 6 in)	29 – 31 January 1997
G/F	3	(Hungary)	Takács, Dániel	1.88 m (6 ft 2 in)	39 – 10 July 1986
G	6	(Hungary)	Tanoh Dez, András	1.90 m (6 ft 3 in)	24 – 29 March 2002
PG	7	(Hungary)	Simon, Kristóf	1.87 m (6 ft 2 in)	31 – 16 September 1994
G	8	(Bosnia and Herzegovina)	Mijovic, Stefan	1.93 m (6 ft 4 in)	31 – 29 March 1995
F	9	(Hungary)	Hajdú, Péter	1.98 m (6 ft 6 in)	22 – 20 February 2004
SF	11	(Hungary)	Völgyi, Marcell	2.01 m (6 ft 7 in)	28 – 22 April 1998
PG	12	(United States)	Sherman, Taz	1.84 m (6 ft 0 in)	26 – 19 July 1999
F/C	15	(Hungary)	Vámos, Ádám	2.00 m (6 ft 7 in)	22 – 31 May 2003
G	19	(Hungary)	Cohil, Edward	1.94 m (6 ft 4 in)	23 – 20 April 2003
PG	24	(Hungary)	Kopácsi, Ákos	1.82 m (6 ft 0 in)	25 – 25 January 2001
C	25	(Hungary)	Peringer, Balázs	2.13 m (7 ft 0 in)	30 – 26 March 1996
F	27	(Hungary) (Dominican Republic)	Valerio-Bodon, Vincent	2.05 m (6 ft 9 in)	24 – 2 May 2001
F	44	(Hungary)	Tarján, Izsák	1.99 m (6 ft 6 in)	24 – 4 April 2002
PF	53	(United States)	Crawley, Isaiah	2.01 m (6 ft 7 in)	27 – 19 July 1998

Head coach

- (Hungary) Szabolcs Baksa

Assistant coach(es)

- (Kosovo) Dragan Aleksic

Legend

- (C) Team captain
- Injured

- Roster
Updated: 5 January 2023

== Notable players ==
Note: Flags indicate national team eligibility at FIBA-sanctioned events. Players may hold other non-FIBA nationalities not displayed.

Criteria

To appear in this section a player must have either:

- Set a club record or won an individual award while at the club
- Played at least one official international match for their national team at any time
- Played at least one official NBA match at any time.

- (Hungary) Tibor Remai
- (Hungary) János Simon
- (Hungary) János Greminger
- (Hungary) Tibor Czinkán
- (Hungary) László Hódi
- (Hungary) Kornél Dávid
- (Hungary) Márton Báder
- (Iceland) Tómas Holton
