= EuroBasket 1946 =

International basketball event

Tournament details
- Host country: Switzerland
- City: Geneva
- Dates: 30 April – 4 May
- Teams: 10
- Venue: 1 (in 1 host city)

Final positions
- Champions: Czechoslovakia (1st title)
- Runners-up: Italy
- Third place: Hungary
- Fourth place: France

Tournament statistics
- Games played: 21
- MVP: (Hungary) Ferenc Németh
- Top scorer: (Poland) Pawel Stok (12.4 points per game)

The 1946 FIBA European Championship, commonly called FIBA EuroBasket 1946, was the fourth FIBA EuroBasket regional basketball championship, held by FIBA and the first since 1939 due to World War II. Ten national teams affiliated with the International Basketball Federation (FIBA) took part in the competition. Switzerland hosted the tournament for a second time, as the championship returned to Geneva.

EuroBasket 1946 saw the beginning of the use of the jump shot, pioneered by Italy's Giuseppe Stefanini.

== Controversy ==
Lithuania, whose Lithuania men's national basketball team has won the EuroBasket 1939, during the World War II has faced three military occupations, firstly by the Soviets in June 1940, then by the Germans in November 1941 and again was re-occupied and annexed by the Soviet Union in 1944, therefore the reigning European champion Lithuania men's national basketball team was dissolved. Lithuanian diplomat Stasys Antanas Bačkis, who has resided in liberated France and continued to represent the Independent Lithuania's Diplomatic Service, invited representatives of the Lithuanian diaspora, ordered outfits of the Lithuania men's national basketball team and the team (which was considered by many contemporary experts as the Europe's strongest) began to prepare for the EuroBasket 1946. However, the Soviet Union strictly protested against the Lithuanian national team's participation in the championship and the FIBA yielded to its pressure, not allowing the Lithuanians to independently compete and to try defend their European title at the EuroBasket 1946.

== Results ==
The 1946 competition consisted of a preliminary round, with one group of four teams and two groups of three teams each. Each team played the other teams in its group once. The top team in each of the groups of three and the top two teams in the group of four played in the semifinals for the top four rankings; the middle teams in the two groups of three moved directly on to the final round for a 5th/6th place playoff; the bottom team in each group of three and the two bottom teams in the group of four played in semifinals for the 7th–10th ranks.

=== First round ===
==== Group A ====
Pos	Team	Pld	W	L	PF	PA	PD	Pts	Qualification
1	Italy	3	3	0	152	71	+81	6	Semifinal
2	Hungary	3	2	1	113	70	+43	5	Semifinal
3	Poland	3	1	2	91	102	−11	4	Classification 7–10
4	Luxembourg	3	0	3	53	166	−113	3	Classification 7–10

Source: fibaeurope.com

Poland	45–28	Luxembourg
Italy	39–31	Hungary
Luxembourg	10–48	Hungary
Poland	25–40	Italy
Italy	73–15	Luxembourg
Poland	21–34	Hungary

==== Group B ====
Pos	Team	Pld	W	L	PF	PA	PD	Pts	Qualification
1	France	2	2	0	112	29	+83	4	Semifinal
2	Netherlands	2	1	1	66	74	−8	3	Classification 5–6
3	England	2	0	2	38	113	−75	2	Classification 7–10

Source: fibaeurope.com

England	27–48	Netherlands
England	11–65	France
France	47–18	Netherlands

==== Group C ====
Pos	Team	Pld	W	L	PF	PA	PD	Pts	Qualification
1	Czechoslovakia	2	2	0	58	50	+8	4	Semifinal
2	Switzerland	2	1	1	50	43	+7	3	Classification 5–6
3	Belgium	2	0	2	56	71	−15	2	Classification 7–10

Source: fibaeurope.com

Czechoslovakia	20–17	Switzerland
Belgium	23–33	Switzerland
Belgium	33–38	Czechoslovakia

=== Final round ===
The middle team of each of the groups of three did not compete in the final round, as they advanced directly to the 5th/6th place playoff. The top team of each of those groups played one of the top two teams of the group of four, with rankings 1st–4th at stake. Similarly, the bottom team in each group of three played one of the two lower teams in the group of four in a semifinal for 7th–10th places.

==== Classification 5th–10th ====
Classification semifinals
England	27
Luxembourg	50
Poland	22
Belgium	39

Seventh place match
Luxembourg	11
Belgium	42
Ninth place match
England	22
Poland	50

Fifth place match
Netherlands	25
Switzerland	36

==== Upper bracket ====
Semifinals
Czechoslovakia	42
Hungary	28
Italy	37
France	25

Final
Czechoslovakia	34
Italy	32
Third place match
Hungary	38
France	32

1946 FIBA EuroBasket champions

Czechoslovakia
1st title

== Final standings ==
1. Czechoslovakia
2. Italy
3. Hungary
4. France
5. Switzerland
6. Netherlands
7. Belgium
8. Luxembourg
9. Poland
10. England

== Team rosters ==
1. Czechoslovakia: Ivan Mrázek, Miloš Bobocký, Jiří Drvota, Josef Ezr, Gustav Hermann, Jan Hluchy, Josef Křepela, Pavel Nerad, Ladislav Simácek, František Stibitz, Josef Toms, Ladislav Trpkoš, Emil Velenský, Miroslav Vondráček (Coach: Frantisek Hajek)

2. Italy: Cesare Rubini, Giuseppe Stefanini, Sergio Stefanini, Albino Bocciai, Mario Cattarini, Marcello de Nardus, Armando Fagarazzi, Giancarlo Marinelli, Valentino Pellarini, Tullio Pitacco, Venzo Vannini

3. Hungary: Ferenc Németh, Geza Bajari, Antal Bankuti, Geza Kardos, Laszlo Kiralyhidi, Tibor Mezőfi, György Nagy, Geza Racz, Ede Vadaszi, Ferenc Velkei (Coach: Istvan Kiraly)

4. France: Robert Busnel, André Buffière, Etienne Roland, Paul Chaumont, René Chocat, Jean Duperray, Emile Frezot, Maurice Girardot, Andre Goeuriot, Henri Lesmayoux, Jacques Perrier, Lucien Rebuffic, Justy Specker, Andre Tartary (Coach: Paul Geist)
