= Tibor Mezőfi =

Hungarian basketball player

Medal record

Representing Hungary

Men's basketball

European Championships
Bronze medal – third place	1946 Switzerland	Hungary
Silver medal – second place	1953 USSR	Hungary
Gold medal – first place	1955 Hungary	Hungary

Tibor Mezőfi (March 18, 1926 in Rákospalota – August 10, 2000 in Budapest) was a Hungarian basketball player who competed in the 1948 Summer Olympics and in the 1952 Summer Olympics.

He was a member of the Hungarian team, which finished sixteenth in the 1948 tournament. Four years later he was part of the Hungarian basketball team, which was eliminated after the group stage in the 1952 tournament. He played all six matches.
