= Pál Bogár =

Hungarian basketball player (1927–2012)

Medal record

Representing Hungary

Men's basketball

European Championships
Silver medal – second place	1953 USSR	Hungary
Gold medal – first place	1955 Hungary	Hungary

Pál Bogár (2 September 1927 – 17 August 2012) was a Hungarian basketball player who competed in the 1952 Summer Olympics.

Bogár was born in Tés. He was part of the Hungarian basketball team, which was eliminated after the group stage of the 1952 tournament. He played in all six matches.
