= Zdeněk Rylich =

Czech basketball player (1931–2024)

Personal information
- Born: 7 March 1931 Nymburk, Czechoslovakia
- Died: 3 September 2024 (aged 93)

Career highlights
- Czechoslovak 20th Century Team (2001)

Zdeněk Rylich (7 March 1931 – 3 September 2024) was a Czech basketball player. He was voted to the Czechoslovak 20th Century Team in 2001. With the senior Czechoslovak national team, Rylich competed in the men's tournament at the 1952 Summer Olympics. With Czechoslovakia, he also won the silver medal at the 1951 EuroBasket, the silver medal at the 1955 EuroBasket, the bronze medal at the 1957 EuroBasket, and the silver medal at the 1959 EuroBasket.

Rylich died on 3 September 2024, at the age of 93. His brother Bohuslav Rylich (1934–2020) was also a basketball player.
