= Mart Laga =

Estonian basketball player

Personal information
- Born: 15 May 1936 Tartu, Estonia
- Died: 27 November 1977 (aged 41)
- Listed height: 6 ft 5 in (1.96 m)
- Listed weight: 203 lb (92 kg)

Career information
- Playing career: 1952–1962
- Position: Center

Career history
- 1952–1957: TRÜ
- 1958–1960: EPA
- 1961–1962: Tartu EMT

Mart Laga
Medal record

Men's basketball

Representing Soviet Union

EuroBasket
| Gold medal – first place | Bulgaria 1957 | USSR |
| Bronze medal – third place | Hungary 1955 | USSR |

Mart Laga (15 May 1936 – 27 November 1977) was an Estonian basketball player who competed for the Soviet Union in the EuroBasket 1955 and EuroBasket 1957 events.

== Club career ==
Started playing basketball in 1952 as a member of TRÜ basketball team (now Tartu Ülikool/Rock). 1956 he played in CSKA Moscow and he won a silver medal with the team of Moscow of Soviet Union League Championship.

== Achievements ==
=== National team ===
- European Championships: 1955, 1957

=== Club ===
- Estonian SSR Championship: 1956, 1960
