= Ede Komáromi =

Hungarian basketball player

Medal record

Representing Hungary

Men's basketball

European Championships
| Silver medal – second place | 1953 USSR | Hungary |

Ede Komáromi (25 August 1928 – 31 January 2006) was a Hungarian basketball player who competed in the 1952 Summer Olympics. He was born in Szeged. He was part of the Hungarian basketball team, which was eliminated after the group stage of the 1952 tournament. He played four matches.
