= Luboš Kolář =

Czech basketball player

Personal information
- Born: 4 February 1929
- Died: 2012 (aged 82–83)

Lubomír "Luboš" Kolář (4 February 1929 – 2012) was a Czech basketball player.

== National team career ==
With the senior Czechoslovakia national team, Kolář competed in the men's tournament at the 1952 Summer Olympics. With Czechoslovakia, he also won the silver medal at the 1955 EuroBasket, and the bronze medal at the 1957 EuroBasket.
