= Ede Vadászi =

Hungarian basketball player

Medal record

Representing Hungary

Men's basketball

European Championships
Bronze medal – third place	1946 Switzerland	Team competition

Ede Vadászi (September 13, 1923 in Budapest – June 12, 1995 in Budapest), a.k.a. Ede Viboch, was a Hungarian basketball player who competed in the 1948 Summer Olympics.

He was a member of the Hungarian team, which finished sixteenth in the 1948 tournament.
