= Ferenc Velkey =

Hungarian basketball and handball player (1915–2008)

Personal information
- Nationality: Hungarian
- Born: November 15, 1915; Nagykáta, Hungary
- Died: September 12, 2008 (aged 92); Budapest, Hungary

Sport
- Sport: Basketball, field handball

Ferenc Velkey or Velkei (November 15, 1915 – September 12, 2008) was a Hungarian basketball and field handball player, and sports administrator.

Velkey was born in Nagykáta on November 15, 1915. He played for the Hungary national basketball team for many years, competing in three European Championships, including a third place finish in 1946. He retired from playing in 1949, after which he continued to be involved in the sport as an international referee and administrator. Away from basketball, he was a member of the Hungarian field handball team which finished fourth in the Olympic tournament in 1936.

Velkey died in Budapest on September 12, 2008, and was buried in Farkasréti Cemetery.
