= Mikhail Studenetsky =

Soviet basketball player (1934–2021)

Personal information
- Born: 6 March 1934 Moscow, Russian SFSR, Soviet Union
- Died: 1 March 2021 (aged 86)

Sport
- Sport: Basketball
- Club: Dynamo Moscow
Medal record
Representing the Soviet Union
Olympic Games
Silver medal – second place	1956 Melbourne	Team
FIBA EuroBasket
Gold medal – first place	1957 Sofia	Team
Gold medal – first place	1959 Istanbul	Team

Mikhail Vladimirovich Studenetsky (Russian: Михаил Владимирович Студенецкий; 6 March 1934 – 1 March 2021) was a Soviet basketball player.

== Biography ==
Studenetsky was a point guard of the Soviet team between 1954 and 1959 and won a silver medal at the 1956 Summer Olympics, as well as the European titles in 1957 and 1959. After retirement he worked as an engineer.

He died on 1 March 2021, aged 86, five days short from his 87th birthday, from COVID-19 during the COVID-19 pandemic in Russia.
