= Jaroslav Tetiva =

Czech basketball player (1932–2021)

Personal information
- Born: 4 February 1932 Chomutov, Czechoslovakia
- Died: 2 March 2021 (aged 89) Czech Republic

Career highlights
- Czechoslovak 20th Century Team (2001)

Jaroslav Tetiva (4 February 1932 – 2 March 2021) was a Czech basketball player. He was voted to the Czechoslovak 20th Century Team in 2001.

With the senior Czechoslovak national team, Tetiva competed in the men's tournament at the 1960 Summer Olympics. With Czechoslovakia, he also won the silver medal at the 1955 EuroBasket, the bronze medal at the 1957 EuroBasket, and the silver medal at the 1959 EuroBasket.
