= János Rácz =

Hungarian basketball player (1941–2023)

Personal information
- Nationality: Hungarian
- Born: 3 August 1941; Baja, Hungary
- Died: 4 March 2023 (aged 81)

Sport
- Sport: Basketball

János Rácz (3 August 1941 – 4 March 2023) was a Hungarian basketball player. He competed in the men's tournament at the 1964 Summer Olympics.
