= István Timár-Geng =

Hungarian basketball player

Personal information
- Nationality: Hungarian
- Born: 26 March 1923 Turda, Romania
- Died: 30 August 1999 (aged 76) Budapest, Hungary

Sport
- Sport: Basketball

István Timár-Geng (26 March 1923 – 30 August 1999) was a Hungarian basketball player. He competed in the men's tournament at the 1948 Summer Olympics.
