= László Bánhegyi =

Hungarian basketball player (1931–2015)

Personal information
- Born: 19 November 1936 Budapest, Kingdom of Hungary
- Died: 24 December 2015 (aged 84) Vienna, Austria
- Listed height: 1.90 m (6 ft 3 in)
- Listed weight: 80 kg (176 lb)

Career information
- Playing career: 1949–1961
- Position: Shooting guard

Career history
- 1949-1951: Vörös Meteor
- 1951-1961: Honved Budapest

Career highlights
- 8× Hungarian League champion (1952-1955, 1957-60)
Medals
Representing the Hungary
EuroBasket
Gold medal – first place	1955 Hungary
Silver medal – second place	1953 Soviet Union

László Bánhegyi (17 January 1931 – 24 December 2015) was a Hungarian basketball player. He competed in the men's tournament at the 1952 Summer Olympics and the 1960 Summer Olympics.

== Club career ==
Banhegyi played the majority of his career with Honved Budapest, winning 8 league titles. In 1958, he made his EuroLeague debut, helping Honved to reach the semifinals stage. He finished this season as the second-best scorer, averaging 22.3 points per game. In total, he played two seasons in the EuroLeague, being among the Top 20 best scorers in both seasons, scoring a total of 234 points in 11 games.

Banhegyi retired from basketball in 1961, at the age of 30.

== National team career ==
The Honved star was a regular member of the Hungarian national team, playing in two Olympic Games (1952, 1960), as well as in 4 Eurobasket editions (1953, 1955, 1957, 1959), winning the title in 1955. Banhegyi averaged 8.9 points per game in Hungarian title run.
