= György Golomán =

Hungarian basketball player

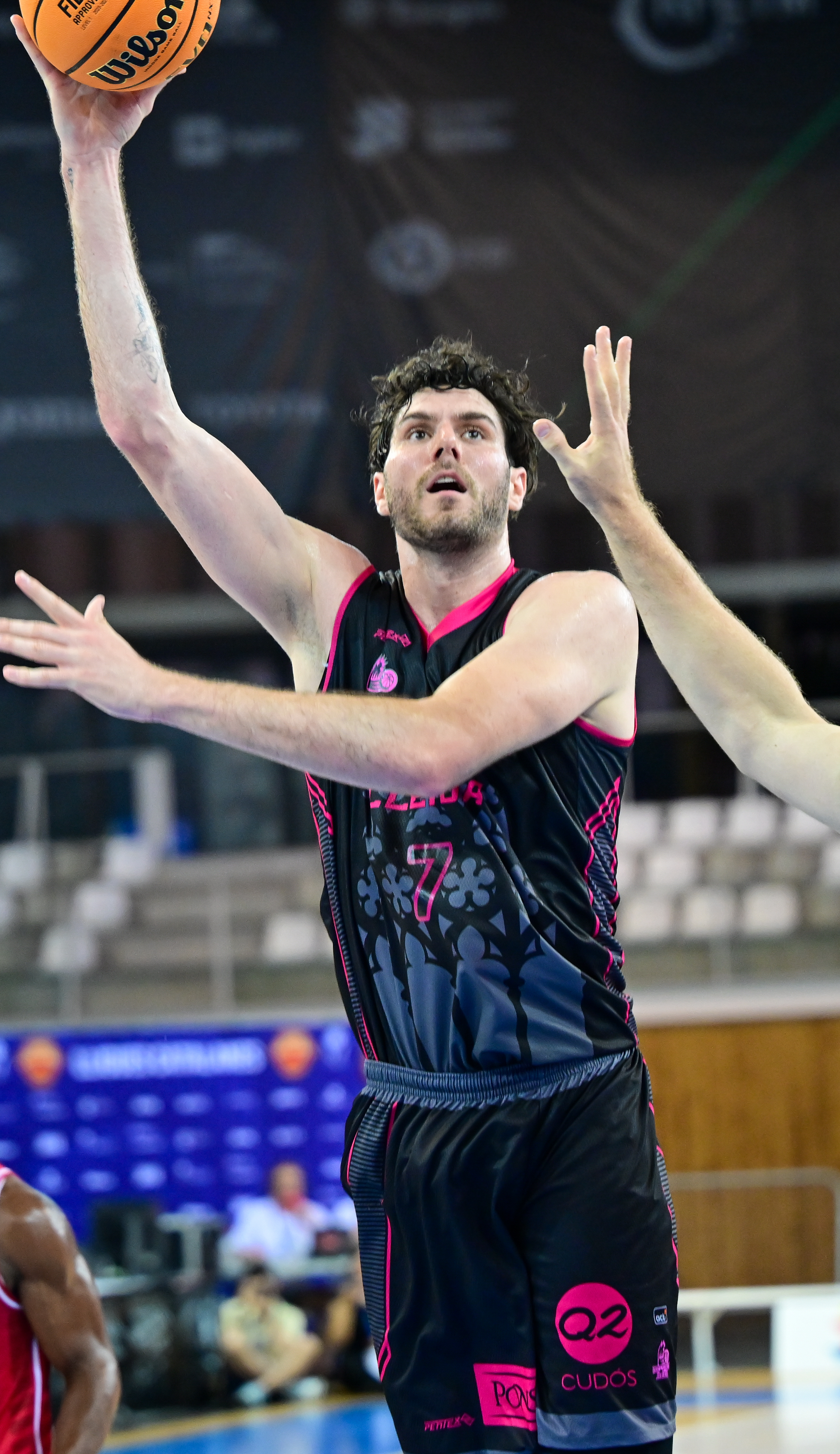
- Golomán with Hiopos Lleida in 2025

No. 7 – Legia Warsaw
- Position: Power forward / center
- League: PLK

Personal information
- Born: 2 April 1996 (age 30) Szombathely, Hungary
- Listed height: 2.11 m (6 ft 11 in)
- Listed weight: 103 kg (227 lb)

Career information
- High school: Sagemont School (Weston, Florida, U.S.)
- College: UCLA (2014–2018)
- NBA draft: 2018: undrafted
- Playing career: 2013–present

Career history
- 2013–2014: Egis Körmend
- 2018–2019: Westchester Knicks
- 2019: Yokohama B-Corsairs
- 2020: Yamagata Wyverns
- 2020–2021: Spirou Charleroi
- 2021–2022: Falco Szombathely
- 2022–2023: Lietkabelis Panevėžys
- 2023–2024: Bàsquet Girona
- 2024–2025: San Pablo Burgos
- 2025–2026: Hiopos Lleida
- 2026–present: Legia Warsaw

Career highlights
- Polish Basketball Supercup winner (2026); Hungarian League champion (2022); Hungarian League Best U-18 player (2013)

György "G. G." Golomán (born 2 April 1996) is a Hungarian professional basketball player for Legia Warsaw of the Polish Basketball League (PLK). He played college basketball for the UCLA Bruins, and went undrafted in the 2018 NBA draft. Golomán started his career with Egis Körmend in his native Hungary.

== High school career ==
Golomán went to high school in Körmend, Hungary, for 3 years, and was part of the Hungarian men's national under-19 basketball team, when an American high school scout noticed him. He went overseas to Florida for his final high school season, playing for Sagemont School. He was recruited to UCLA after assistant Ed Schilling came to watch his teammate Prince Ali.

== College career ==
Golomán played in 35 games in his freshman season at the University of California, Los Angeles (UCLA), averaging 1.3 points per game in 10.8 minutes of play. During his sophomore season, he played in 15 games, averaging 2.0 points per game in 12.1 minutes of play, before an injury ended his season. In his junior season, he made his first start, starting 5 games out of the 35 UCLA played that season. He averaged 3.7 points per game in 11.5 minutes. With the departure of T. J. Leaf in the 2017 NBA draft, Golomán became the starting power forward for the Bruins in 2017–18. He started 30 games out of 33, and averaged 7.1 points, and 4.2 rebounds per game in 24.4 minutes of play.

== Professional career ==
After going undrafted in the 2018 NBA draft, Golomán was signed by the Los Angeles Lakers for the summer league, but didn't make the final roster, and was released on the 10th of October. The Westchester Knicks picked him up to their training camp roster, and he ended up making the final roster for the Knicks’ G League Team. He signed with the Yokohama B-Corsairs of the B.League in Japan for 2019–20.

On 9 July 2020, Goloman signed with Spirou Basket of the Pro Basketball League.

On 14 July 2022, Goloman signed with Lietkabelis Panevėžys of the Lithuanian Basketball League (LKL) and the EuroCup.

On 19 August 2023, Golomán signed with Bàsquet Girona of the Liga ACB.

After spending the 2024–25 season with San Pablo Burgos in Primera FEB, Golomán signed with Hiopos Lleida of the Liga ACB on August 27, 2025.

On July 23, 2026, he signed with Legia Warsaw of the Polish Basketball League (PLK).
