= Stojan Ivković =

Montenegrin basketball player and coach (born 1966)

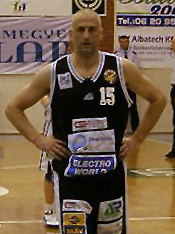

Personal information
- Born: February 5, 1966 (age 60) Dubrovnik, SR Croatia, SFR Yugoslavia
- Listed height: 2.06 m (6 ft 9 in)
- Listed weight: 112 kg (247 lb)

Career information
- NBA draft: 1988: undrafted
- Playing career: 1981–2006
- Position: Power forward / center
- Number: 15
- Coaching career: 2005–present

Career history

Playing
- 1981–1982: Budućnost Titograd
- 1982–1987: Rabotnički Skopje
- 1987–1992: Spartak Subotica
- 1992–1996: Szolnoki Olaj
- 1996–1997: Tegáz Debrecen
- 1997–1998: Szolnoki Olaj
- 1998–1999: Soproni
- 1999–2000: Szolnoki Olaj
- 2000–2004: Kaposvár
- 2004–2004: Pécsi VSK-Pannonpower

Coaching
- 2005–2009: Pécsi VSK-Pannonpower
- 2007–2008: Hungary
- 2009–2015: Kecskeméti TE/ Duna Aszfalt
- 2012–2013: Montenegro (assistant)
- 2013–present: Hungary
- 2016–2017: Szolnoki Olaj
- 2019-: Kaposvár

Stojan Ivković (Serbian Cyrillic: Стојан Ивковић; born February 5, 1966) is a Montenegrin professional basketball coach and former player. He currently works as a head coach for the Hungary national team and as a head coach for the Kaposvári KK of the Hungarian First League.

== Playing career ==
Ivković started his basketball career playing with the youth teams of his hometown team Kotor. In 1981, at 15 years of age, he signed a 5-year contract with the Budućnost of the Yugoslav Federal League. The following year he moved to the Rabotnički from Skopje where he played in the Yugoslav League until 1987. In the same year he moved to the Spartak Subotica, where he played for five years.

In 1992 he started to play for the Szolnoki Olaj of the Hungarian First League. On three occasions, he played in total six years for the Szolnoki Olaj. In the Hungarian League he also played for the Tegáz Debrecen, the Soproni, the Kaposvári and for the Pécsi VSK-Pannonpower, where he finished his playing career in 2006.

== Coaching career ==
Ivković began his coaching career in 2005 as a player-coach for the PVSK Panthers of the Hungarian First League. He worked there until 2009 when he took over coaching of the Kecskeméti TE. In 2015, he left the Kecskeméti TE, which changed its name to KTE Duna Aszfalt due to sponsorship reasons in 2012.

In 2012, Ivković became a sports director of the Szolnoki Olaj. He also coached the team during 2016–2017 season.

=== National teams ===
==== Hungary ====
Ivković had a stint with Hungary national team in 2007 for a single year. In 2013, he became head coach of the Hungarian national team for the second time. In the EuroBasket 2017 qualification he managed to qualify the Hungarian team for the EuroBasket 2017. It is the second time since 1969 that Hungary competed in EuroBasket (the first was in 1999).

==== Montenegro ====
In May 2012, Ivković became an assistant coach for the Montenegro national team. Luka Pavićević became head coach for Montenegro team while Ivković was named his first assistant. Ivković had left the staff in February 2013 when he became a head coach for Hungary.

== Career achievements and awards ==
Player

- Hungarian First League champion: (with Kaposvári: 2000–01, 2003–04)
- Hungarian Cup winner: (with Kaposvári: 2004)

Coach

- Hungarian First League champion: (with Szolnoki Olaj: 2015–16)
- Hungarian Second League champion: (with Kecskeméti TE-Duna Aszfalt: 2012–13)
- Hungarian Cup winner: (with Pécsi VSK-Pannonpower: 2009)

== Personal life ==
Ivković in born in Dubrovnik, SR Croatia, SFR Yugoslavia to Montenegrin–Serb father and Montenegrin–Croat mother. His father's origin is from Prčanj, a small town along the Bay of Kotor in Montenegro.

Ivković and his wife Tímea Béres have two sons, Milan and Marko. Tímea is a Hungarian professional basketball coach and scout and former player. Ivkovic has 2 children from his previous marriage.
