= Ödön Lendvay =

Hungarian basketball player

Personal information
- Nationality: Hungarian
- Born: 24 January 1943; Budapest, Hungary
- Died: 26 October 1990 (aged 47); Budapest, Hungary

Sport
- Sport: Basketball

Ödön Lendvay (24 January 1943 – 26 October 1990) was a Hungarian basketball player. He competed in the men's tournament at the 1964 Summer Olympics.
