= György Bokor =

Hungarian basketball player

Personal information
- Nationality: Hungarian
- Born: 25 November 1928; Budapest, Hungary
- Died: 15 June 2014 (aged 85)

Sport
- Sport: Basketball

György Bokor (25 November 1928 – 15 June 2014) was a Hungarian basketball player. He competed in the men's tournament at the 1952 Summer Olympics.
