= Gábor Kulcsár =

Hungarian sprint canoer

Medal record

Men's canoe sprint

World Championships
Gold medal – first place	1986 Montreal	K-2 10000 m
Silver medal – second place	1989 Plovdiv	K-4 10000 m

Gábor Kulcsar is a Hungarian sprint canoer who competed in the late 1980s. He won two medals at the ICF Canoe Sprint World Championships with a gold (K-2 10000 m: 1986) and a silver (K-4 10000 m: 1989).
