= Nate Reuvers =

American-Hungarian basketball player (born 1998)

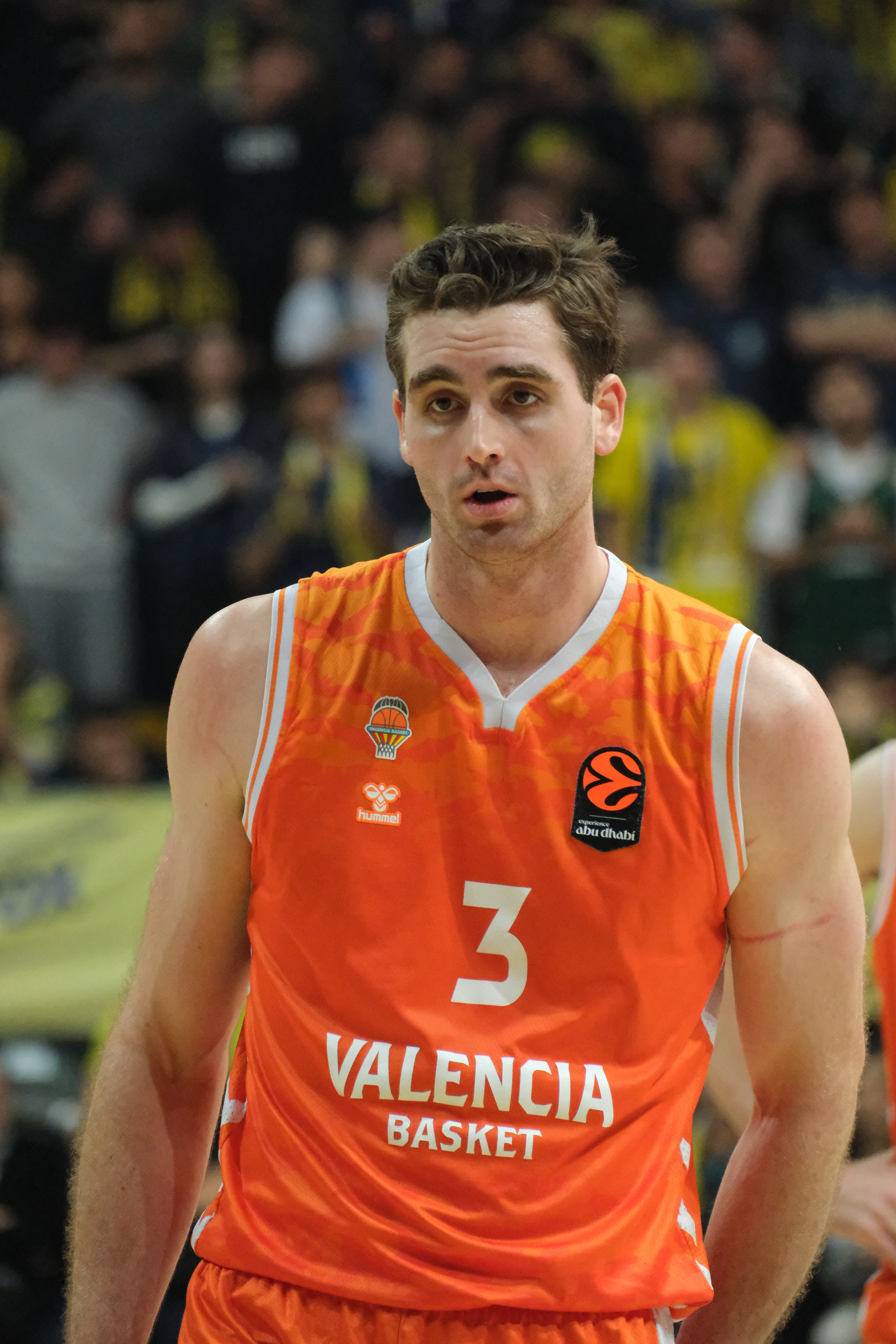
- Reuvers with Valencia Basket in 2026

No. 3 – Valencia Basket
- Position: Center / power forward
- League: Liga ACB; EuroLeague

Personal information
- Born: September 30, 1998 (age 28) Lakeville, Minnesota, U.S.
- Listed height: 6 ft 11 in (2.11 m)
- Listed weight: 235 lb (107 kg)

Career information
- High school: Lakeville North (Lakeville, Minnesota)
- College: Wisconsin (2017–2021)
- NBA draft: 2021: undrafted
- Playing career: 2021–present

Career history
- 2021–2022: Cibona
- 2022–2023: Reggio Emilia
- 2023–present: Valencia

Career highlights
- Croatian League champion (2022); Croatian Cup winner (2022); Spanish Supercup winner (2025); Spanish League champion (2026); ABA League blocks leader (2022); Third-team All-Big Ten (2020)

Nathan Donald Reuvers (born September 30, 1998) is an American-born naturalized Hungarian professional basketball player for Valencia of the Spanish Liga ACB and the EuroLeague. He played college basketball for the Wisconsin Badgers.

== High school career ==
Reuvers played basketball for Lakeville North High School in Lakeville, Minnesota. He stood 6 feet 6 inches (1.98 m) by the time he was a freshman. Reuvers also played soccer as a goalkeeper in high school but began focusing on basketball after drawing NCAA Division I interest as a sophomore in the latter sport. In his junior season, he averaged 19.8 points and 8.2 rebounds per game, helping his team reach the Class 4A state title game. As a senior, Reuvers averaged 25.6 points, 12.3 rebounds and 3.5 blocks per game, leading Lakeville North to a 24–2 record and the Class 4A state quarterfinals. He was a finalist for the Minnesota Mr. Basketball award. By the end of his career, Reuvers ranked second in school history in career points (1,619), behind J. P. Macura.

=== Recruiting ===
On May 18, 2016, after his junior season, Reuvers committed to play college basketball for Wisconsin over 24 Division I offers, including Minnesota. He was considered a four-star recruit by major recruiting services. Reuvers chose the Badgers because coach Greg Gard and his assistants had sold him on Wisconsin's history of developing big men, particularly Frank Kaminsky and Jon Leuer.

College recruiting
Name	Hometown	School	Height	Weight	Commit date
Nate Reuvers; PF	Lakeville, MN	Lakeville North (MN)	6 ft 10 in (2.08 m)	220 lb (100 kg)	May 18, 2016
Nate Reuvers; PF	Recruit ratings: Rivals: 247Sports: ESPN: (83)				
Overall recruit ranking: Rivals: 83 247Sports: 56 ESPN: 86
Note: In many cases, Scout, Rivals, 247Sports, On3, and ESPN may conflict in their listings of height and weight.; In these cases, the average was taken. ESPN grades are on a 100-point scale.; Sources: "Wisconsin 2017 Basketball Commitments". Rivals.; "2017 Wisconsin Badgers Recruiting Class". ESPN.; "2017 Team Ranking". Rivals.

== College career ==
Reuvers initially planned on redshirting his freshman year, but coach Gard put him in the lineup five games into the season due to a lack of production from their junior forwards. In his debut against Milwaukee, Reuvers missed all six shots but had six rebounds and two assists. As a freshman, he averaged 5.3 points and 2.0 rebounds per game and made 15 starts. Following the season he increased his weight from 215 to 240 pounds, working with the strength and conditioning coach to add muscle to become more physical. Reuvers posted his first double-double of 22 points and 10 rebounds in a win at Illinois on January 23, 2019. He averaged 7.9 points, 3.9 rebounds, 1.0 assists, and a team-leading 1.8 blocks per game as a sophomore.

Coming into his junior season, Reuvers was expected to help replace the production of the graduating Ethan Happ. In the season debut, he matched a career-high 22 points along with six rebounds and four blocks in a 65–63 overtime loss to Saint Mary's. Reuvers nearly had a triple-double on November 8, 2019, compiling 14 points, 14 rebounds and nine blocks in a 65–52 win over Eastern Illinois. He was named Big Ten player of the week on November 11. On December 21, 2020, Reuvers scored 22 points in an 83–64 win against Milwaukee. After the addition of Micah Potter to the lineup in the Milwaukee game, Reuvers's offensive efficiency declined during the beginning of the conference season, shooting 3 of 12 from the field against Ohio State but still leading the team with 17 points. Reuvers helped Wisconsin win a share of the Big Ten regular-season title and led the team in scoring (13.1 points per game) and blocks (1.9 per game) and also pulled down 4.5 rebounds per game. He was named third-team All-Big Ten by the coaches and media. As a senior, Reuvers averaged 8.3 points, 3.3 rebounds, and 1.3 blocks per game, becoming Wisconsin's all-time leader in blocked shots. He announced he was turning professional after the season and hired an agent.

== Professional career ==
On July 24, 2021, Reuvers signed his first professional contract with Cibona in the Croatian League and the ABA League. He joined the Cleveland Cavaliers for the 2022 NBA Summer League. Reuvers spent the 2022–23 campaign in Italy with Reggio Emilia. On August 1, 2023, Reuvers signed a three-year deal with Spanish club Valencia. On March 17, 2026, Reuvers signed a contract extension with Valencia until the end of the 2027–28 season.

== Career statistics ==
Legend
GP	Games played	GS	Games started	MPG	Minutes per game
FG%	Field-goal percentage	3P%	3-point field-goal percentage	FT%	Free-throw percentage
RPG	Rebounds per game	APG	Assists per game	SPG	Steals per game
BPG	Blocks per game	PPG	Points per game	PIR	Performance index rating
**Bold**	Career high

=== EuroLeague ===
Year	Team	GP	GS	MPG	FG%	3P%	FT%	RPG	APG	SPG	BPG	PPG	PIR
2023–24	Valencia	29	11	14.9	.387	.266	.667	2.3	.5	.2	.4	4.9	3.1
Career		29	11	14.9	.387	.266	.667	2.3	.5	.2	.4	4.9	3.1

=== College ===
Year	Team	GP	GS	MPG	FG%	3P%	FT%	RPG	APG	SPG	BPG	PPG
2017–18	Wisconsin	28	15	16.6	.382	.255	**.833**	2.0	.8	.3	.9	5.3
2018–19	Wisconsin	**34**	**34**	22.9	**.449**	**.381**	.634	3.9	**1.0**	.3	1.8	7.9
2019–20	Wisconsin	31	31	**26.2**	.448	.337	.786	**4.5**	.6	**.5**	**1.9**	**13.1**
2020–21	Wisconsin	31	24	21.0	.420	.286	.780	3.3	.7	.3	1.3	8.3
Career		124	104	21.8	.431	.325	.761	3.5	.8	.3	1.5	8.7

== Personal life ==
Reuvers is the youngest of five children of Teresa and Paul Reuvers. In his youth, Reuvers frequently got into fights with his next oldest brother, Jonathan.
