= Dušan Lukášik =

Slovak basketball player

Personal information
- Nationality: Slovak
- Born: 28 May 1932; Ružomberok, Czechoslovakia
- Died: 3 September 2010 (aged 78); Ružomberok, Slovakia

Sport
- Sport: Basketball

Dušan Lukášik (28 May 1932 – 3 September 2010) was a Slovak basketball player. He competed in the men's tournament at the 1960 Summer Olympics.

== See also ==
- Czechoslovak Basketball League career stats leaders
