= József Prieszol =

Hungarian basketball player

Personal information
- Nationality: Hungarian
- Born: 19 November 1942 (age 82); Budapest, Hungary

Sport
- Sport: Basketball

József Prieszol (born 19 November 1942) is a former Hungarian basketball player. He competed in the men's tournament at the 1964 Summer Olympics.
