= György Nagy =

Hungarian basketball player

Personal information
- Nationality: Hungarian
- Born: 21 December 1926; Budapest, Hungary
- Died: 7 September 2004 (aged 77); Budapest, Hungary

Sport
- Sport: Basketball

György Nagy (21 December 1926 – 7 September 2004) was a Hungarian basketball player. He competed in the men's tournament at the 1948 Summer Olympics.
