= Antal Bánkuti =

Hungarian basketball player (1923–2001)

Personal information
- Nationality: Hungarian
- Born: 1 June 1923; Piškorevci, Kingdom of SCS
- Died: 21 July 2001 (aged 78); Montreal, Quebec, Canada

Sport
- Sport: Basketball

Antal Bánkuti (1 June 1923 – 21 July 2001) was a Hungarian basketball player. He competed in the men's tournament at the 1948 Summer Olympics.
