= György Pólik =

Hungarian basketball player

Personal information
- Nationality: Hungarian
- Born: 9 September 1939 (age 85); Budapest, Hungary

Sport
- Sport: Basketball

György Pólik (born 9 September 1939) is a former Hungarian basketball player. He competed in the men's tournament at the 1960 Summer Olympics, and the 1964 Summer Olympics.
