= László Hódi =

Hungarian-Australian basketball player (1934–2023)

László Hódy (Note: Also known as László Hódi, Hódi László and Les Hody.) (10 July 1934 – 26 May 2023) was a Hungarian-Australian basketball player. He competed for Hungary in the 1952 Summer Olympics and Australia in the 1964 Summer Olympics, the first basketballer to compete at the Olympics for two countries.

Hódy was part of the Hungarian basketball team, which was eliminated after the group stage of the 1952 tournament. He played three games.

Hódy migrated to Australia where he took the name Les Hody and played for the Australia men's national basketball team.

== Hungary ==
László Hódy was born in Szeged on 10 July 1934 to Janos and Agnes Hódy who owned the Hódy shoe shop and factory. When Laszlo was 12, the artist Janos Vinkler painted Ket fiu, a portrait of László and his older brother Janos.

The brothers discovered basketball at school and were soon playing for Szeged Postas club in the first division. Laszlo then joined the Army teams Szeged Honved and Budapesti Honvéd and was selected to play for the Olympic team in Helsinki at the age of 17. Janos, and their younger brothers Zsolt and Szabolcs and their sister Ildiko, would also represent Hungary in sports.

With the national team, László won a silver medal at the 1953 European Championship in Moscow and won the 1954 World University and European Championships.

== Australia ==
After the Hungarian Revolution of 1956, László, his brother Janos and another basketballer Tibor Remai and Vera Neszmélyi, the 100m sprinter, all four European Champions, escaped together to Austria then Australia in 1957. There Laszlo and Vera married and settled in Adelaide. The brothers took the Australian names Les and John and played basketball for the newly created Budapest Basketball team.

Les variously worked for, or owned in partnership with Vera, businesses in leatherwork, painting, assembling fridges, knitwear, fabric cutting, retail and truck driving.

In 1963, Les gained Australian nationality, moved to Melbourne and was selected to play for Australia at the Tokyo Olympics where, at the age of 30, he was the second-highest scorer for Australia.

In 1972, Les and Vera divorced and Les moved to New Zealand where he severed his Achilles’ tendon and ended his basketball career. Les worked as a painter, manager, driver and orchardist until, in 1975, he returned to Melbourne to become an egg farmer with his brothers John and Szabolcs.

In 1983, Les married Eva Tar and together they established the cosmetics company Vogue Colours International which sold seasonal colour analysis, Poppy King and other beauty products.

In 1995, Les, along with the rest of the 1955 European Championship team, received the Golden Cross of the Order of Merit of the Republic of Hungary.

In 2012, Les was inducted into the Legends of the Basketball Hall of Fame in Hungary. In 2015, as Laszlo Hody, he published his autobiography Not an Ordinary Life: From class enemy to Hall of Fame and a lifetime in between.

== Death ==
Hódi died on 26 May 2023, at the age of 88.
