= István Liptay =

Hungarian basketball player (1935–2022)

Personal information
- Born: 10 August 1935; Szeged, Hungary
- Died: 18 August 2022 (aged 87)

Sport
- Country: Hungary
- Sport: Basketball

István Liptay (10 August 1935 – 18 August 2022) was a Hungarian basketball player. He competed in the men's tournament at the 1960 Summer Olympics.

Liptay died on 18 August 2022, at the age of 87.
