= Géza Kardos =

Hungarian basketball player

Personal information
- Nationality: Hungarian
- Born: 20 June 1918; Budapest, Austria-Hungary
- Died: 13 July 1986 (aged 68); Budapest, Hungary

Sport
- Sport: Basketball

Géza Kardos (20 June 1918 – 13 July 1986) was a Hungarian basketball player. He competed in the men's tournament at the 1948 Summer Olympics.
