= Péter Papp =

Hungarian basketball player

Personal information
- Born: 6 October 1930 Szeged, Hungary
- Died: 16 September 1958 (aged 27) Budapest, Hungary

Sport
- Sport: Basketball

Péter Papp (6 October 1930 – 16 September 1958) was a Hungarian basketball player. He competed in the men's tournament at the 1952 Summer Olympics.
