= Tibor Kangyal =

Hungarian basketball player

Personal information
- Nationality: Hungarian
- Born: 28 May 1942 (age 83) Budapest, Hungary

Sport
- Sport: Basketball

Tibor Kangyal (born 28 May 1942) is a former Hungarian basketball player. He competed in the men's tournament at the 1964 Summer Olympics. He made 52 appearances for the national team.
