= Pál Koczka =

Hungarian basketball player

Personal information
- Nationality: Hungarian
- Born: 22 March 1939; Budapest, Hungary
- Died: 2 June 2016 (aged 77)

Sport
- Sport: Basketball

Pál Koczka (22 March 1939 – 2 June 2016) was a Hungarian basketball player. He competed in the men's tournament at the 1964 Summer Olympics.
