= Tibor Czinkán =

Hungarian basketball player (1929–2013)

Medal record

Representing Hungary

Men's basketball

European Championships
Silver medal – second place	1953 USSR	Hungary
Gold medal – first place	1955 Hungary	Hungary

Tibor Czinkán (10 August 1929 – 20 December 2013) was a Hungarian basketball player who competed in the 1952 Summer Olympics.

He was part of the Hungarian basketball team, which was eliminated after the group stage of the 1952 tournament. He played five matches.
