= Tibor Zsíros =

Hungarian basketball player

Medal record

Representing Hungary

Men's basketball

European Championships
Silver medal – second place	1953 USSR	Hungary
Gold medal – first place	1955 Hungary	Hungary

Tibor Zsíros (30 June 1930 – 13 February 2013) was a Hungarian basketball player who competed in the 1948 Summer Olympics, the 1952 Summer Olympics and the 1960 Summer Olympics.

A native of Budapest, Zsíros was a member of the Hungarian team, which finished sixteenth in the 1948 tournament. Four years later he was part of the Hungarian basketball team, which was eliminated after the group stage in the 1952 tournament. He played in all six matches.
