= Mikhail Semyonov (basketball) =

Russian basketball player

Olympic medal record

Representing Soviet Union

Men's basketball

Olympic Games
Silver medal – second place	1956 Melbourne	USSR
Silver medal – second place	1960 Rome	USSR

Mikhail Vladimirovich Semyonov (October 18, 1933 — November 9, 2006) was a Russian basketball player born in Rostov-na-Donu, Rostov, Russia. As a member of the Soviet Union national basketball team he competed at the 1956 and 1960 Olympics, winning two silver medals.
