= Zoltán Judik =

Hungarian basketball player

Personal information
- Nationality: Hungarian
- Born: 5 May 1933 (age 91); Budapest, Hungary

Sport
- Sport: Basketball

Zoltán Judik (born 5 May 1933) is a former Hungarian basketball player. He competed in the men's tournament at the 1960 Summer Olympics.
