= Árpád Glatz =

Hungarian basketball player (1939–2000)

Personal information
- Nationality: Hungarian
- Born: 5 January 1939; Budapest, Hungary
- Died: 5 December 2000 (aged 61); Budapest, Hungary

Sport
- Sport: Basketball

Árpád Glatz (5 January 1939 – 5 December 2000) was a Hungarian basketball player. He competed in the men's tournament at the 1960 Summer Olympics and the 1964 Summer Olympics.
