= Ottó Temesvári =

Hungarian basketball player

Personal information
- Nationality: Hungarian
- Born: 9 December 1934 (age 90); Szob, Hungary

Sport
- Sport: Basketball

Ottó Temesvári (born 9 December 1934) is a former Hungarian basketball player. He competed in the men's tournament at the 1960 Summer Olympics.
