= Miklós Boháty =

Hungarian basketball player

Personal information
- Nationality: Hungarian
- Born: 6 December 1935; Fegyvernek, Hungary
- Died: 19 June 1983 (aged 47); Budapest, Hungary

Sport
- Sport: Basketball

Miklós Boháty (6 December 1935 – 19 June 1983) was a Hungarian basketball player. He competed in the men's tournament at the 1960 Summer Olympics and the 1964 Summer Olympics.
