= László Gabányi =

Hungarian basketball player (1935–1981)

Personal information
- Nationality: Hungarian
- Born: 15 May 1935; Hódmezővásárhely, Hungary
- Died: 16 June 1981 (aged 46); Budapest, Hungary

Sport
- Sport: Basketball

László Gabányi (15 May 1935 – 16 June 1981) was a Hungarian basketball player. He competed in the men's tournament at the 1960 Summer Olympics and the 1964 Summer Olympics.
