= János Simon =

Hungarian basketball player

Medal record

Representing Hungary

Men's basketball

European Championships
Silver medal – second place	1953 USSR	Hungary
Gold medal – first place	1955 Hungary	Hungary

János Simon (Hungarian pronunciation: [ˈjaːnoʃ ˈʃimon]; 1 March 1929 – 31 October 2010) was a Hungarian basketball player who competed in the 1952 Summer Olympics and 1960 Summer Olympics. He was born in Budapest-Budafok.

Simon was part of the Hungarian basketball team, which was eliminated after the group stage of the 1952 tournament. He played all six matches. Simon also played in the 1960 Summer Olympics where his team finished ninth.
