= János Greminger =

Hungarian basketball player

Personal information
- Born: 5 May 1929 Szeged, Kingdom of Hungary
- Died: 17 October 2009 (aged 80) Budapest, Hungary
- Listed height: 180 cm (5 ft 11 in)
- Listed weight: 69 kg (152 lb)
Medals
Representing Hungary
Men's basketball
EuroBasket
Silver medal – second place	1953 USSR	Hungary
Gold medal – first place	1955 Hungary	Hungary

János Greminger (5 May 1929 – 17 October 2009) was a Hungarian basketball player. He was born in Szeged.

== Hungarian national team ==
Greminger was a member of the senior men's Hungarian national basketball team. He was a part of the Hungarian national team, that was eliminated after the group stage of the 1952 Summer Olympic Games. He played in all six of Hungary's games during the tournament. He was also a part of the Hungarian national team at the 1960 Summer Olympics in Rome, where Hungary finished in 9th place. He also played with Hungary at the 1964 Summer Olympics in Tokyo, where his team finished in 13th place.
