= János Bencze (basketball) =

Hungarian basketball player

Personal information
- Born: 12 October 1934 Hódmezővásárhely, Hungary
- Died: 31 July 2014 (aged 79) Budapest, Hungary

Sport
- Sport: Basketball

János Bencze (12 October 1934 – 31 July 2014) was a Hungarian basketball player. He competed in the men's tournament at the 1960 Summer Olympics and the 1964 Summer Olympics.
