= Canada at the 1976 Summer Olympics =

- IOC code: CAN
- NOC: Canadian Olympic Committee

in Montreal, Canada July 17–August 1, 1976
- Competitors: 385 (261 men and 124 women) in 23 sports
- Flag bearer: Abby Hoffman
- Medals Ranked 27th: Gold 0 Silver 5 Bronze 6 Total 11

Summer Olympics appearances (overview)
- ~~1900~~; 1904; 1908; 1912; 1920; 1924; 1928; 1932; 1936; 1948; 1952; 1956; 1960; 1964; 1968; 1972; 1976; 1980; 1984; 1988; 1992; 1996; 2000; 2004; 2008; 2012; 2016; 2020; 2024; 2028

Other related appearances
- 1906 Intercalated Games

Canada was the host nation for the 1976 Summer Olympics in Montreal, held from 17 July to 1 August 1976. 385 competitors, 261 men and 124 women, took part in 173 events in 23 sports.

For the first and, so far, only time in Summer Olympics history, the host nation failed to win a gold medal.

== Medallists ==
Canada finished in 27th position in the final medal rankings, with five silver medals and six bronze medals.

Medal	Name	Sport	Event	Date
Silver	Clay Evans; Gary MacDonald; Steve Pickell; Graham Smith	Swimming	Men's 4 × 100 metre medley relay	22 July
Silver	Cheryl Gibson	Swimming	Women's 400 metre individual medley	24 July
Silver	Michel Vaillancourt	Equestrian	Individual jumping	27 July
Silver	John Wood	Canoeing	Men's C-1 500 metres	30 July
Silver	Greg Joy	Athletics	Men's high jump	31 July
Bronze	Robin Corsiglia; Wendy Hogg; Anne Jardin; Susan Sloan	Swimming	Women's 4 × 100 metre medley relay	18 July
Bronze	Shannon Smith	Swimming	Women's 400 metre freestyle	20 July
Bronze	Nancy Garapick	Swimming	Women's 100 metre backstroke	21 July
Bronze	Becky Wiber	Swimming	Women's 400 metre individual medley	24 July
Bronze	Nancy Garapick	Swimming	Women's 200 metre backstroke	25 July
Bronze	Gail Amundrud; Barbara Clark; Anne Jardin; Becky Wiber	Swimming	Women's 4 × 100 metre freestyle relay	25 July

== Archery ==
Canada was represented by two women and two men in Montreal. It was the second time Canadians had competed in archery. Lucille Lemay became the most successful Canadian Olympic archer by taking 5th place, surpassing Donald Jackson's 6th-place finish four years earlier. Canada placed sixth in the national standings for archery.

Women's individual competition:

- Lucille Lemay – 2401 points (→ 5th place)
- Wanda Allan – 2303 points (→ 16th place)

Men's individual competition:

- Dave Mann – 2431 points (→ 7th place)
- Edward Gamble – 2362 points (→ 16th place)

== Athletics ==
Men's 5.000 metres

- Grant McLaren
  - Heat – 13:46.40 (→ did not advance)

Men's 10.000 metres

- Dan Shaughnessy
- Chris McCubbins

Men's 4 × 100 metres relay

- Hugh Spooner, Marvin Nash, Albin Dukowski, and Hugh Fraser
  - Heat – 39.72s
  - Semi-final – 39.46s
  - Final – 39.47s (→ 8th place)

Men's 4 × 400 metres relay

- Ian Seale, Don Domansky, Leighton Hope, and Brian Saunders
  - Heat – 3:03.89
  - Final – 3:02.64 (→ 4th place)

Men's marathon

- Jerome Drayton – 2:13:30 (→ 6th place)
- Tom Howard – 2:22:08 (→ 30th place)
- Wayne Yetman – 2:24:17 (→ 36th place)

Men's high jump

- Greg Joy
  - Qualification – 2.16m
  - Final – 2.23m (→ Silver medal)
- Claude Ferragne
  - Qualification – 2.16m
  - Final – 2.14m (→ 12th place)
- Robert Forget
  - Qualification – 2.05m (→ did not advance)

Men's long jump

- Richard Rock
  - Qualification – 7.57m (→ did not advance)
- Jim Buchanan
  - Qualification – 7.49m (→ did not advance)
- Jim McAndrew
  - Qualification – 7.48m (→ did not advance)

Men's discus throw

- Ain Roost
  - Qualification – 56.56m (→ did not advance)
- Borys Chambul
  - Qualification – 55.86m (→ did not advance)
- Bishop Dolegiewicz
  - Qualification – NM (→ did not advance)

Men's 20 km Race Walk

- Marcel Jobin – 1:34:33 (→ 23rd place)
- Pat Farrelly – 1:41:36 (→ 33rd place)
- Alex Oakley – 1:44:08 (→ 35th place)

Women's shot put

- Lucette Moreau
  - Final – 15.48 m (→ 13th place)

== Basketball ==
Men's team competition

- Preliminary round (group A):
  - Defeated Japan (104–76)
  - Defeated Cuba (84–79)
  - Lost to Soviet Union (85–108)
  - Defeated Australia (81–69)
  - Defeated Mexico (92–84)
- Semi-finals:
  - Lost to United States (77–96)
- Bronze Medal Match:
  - Lost to Soviet Union (72–100) → 4th place
- Team roster
  - Alexander Devlin
  - Martin Riley
  - Bill Robinson
  - John Cassidy
  - Derek Sankey
  - Robert Sharpe
  - Cameron Hall
  - James Russell
  - Robert Town
  - Romel Raffin
  - Lars Hansen
  - Phil Tollestrup
- Head coach: John Donohue

Women's team competition

- Team roster
  - Joyce Douthwright
  - Joanne Sargent
  - Anne Hurley
  - Christine Critelli
  - Beverley Bland
  - Coleen Dufresne
  - Sheila Strike
  - Sylvia Sweeney
  - Carol Turney
  - Donna Hobin
  - Angela Johnson
  - Beverly Barnes
- Head coach: Brian Heaney

== Boxing ==
Men's Light Flyweight (– 48 kg)

- Sidney McKnight
  1. First round – lost to Li Byong-Uk (PRK), KO-1

Men's flyweight (– 51 kg)

- Ian Clyde
  1. First round – bye
  2. Second round – defeated Alick Chiteule (ZAM), walkover
  3. Third round – defeated Charlie Magri (GBR), KO-3
  4. Quarterfinals – lost to Ramón Duvalón (CUB), 0:5

Men's bantamweight (– 54 kg)

- Chris Ius
  1. First round – bye
  2. Second round – defeated Mohamed Ayele (ETH), walkover
  3. Third Round – lost to Weerachart Saturngrun (THA), 0:5

Men's featherweight (– 57 kg)

- Camille Huard
  1. First round – bye
  2. Second round – defeated Bachir Koual (ALG), walkover
  3. Third Round – lost to Leszek Kosedowski (POL), 0:5

Men's Light Welterweight (– 64 kg)

- Chris Clarke
  1. First round – bye
  2. Second round – defeated Lasse Friman (FIN), 5:0
  3. Third Round – lost to József Nagy (HUN), RSC-3

Men's welterweight (– 67 kg)

- Carmen Rinke
  1. First round – bye
  2. Second round – defeated Kenneth Bristol (GUY), walkover
  3. Third round – defeated Yoshioki Seki (JPN), 4:1
  4. Quarterfinals – lost to Jochen Bachfeld (GDR), 0:5

Men's Light Middleweight (– 71 kg)

- Michael Prevost
  1. First round – lost to Vasile Didea (ROM), DSQ-3

Men's middleweight (– 75 kg)

- Bryan Gibson
  1. First round – lost to Bernd Wittenburg (GDR), KO-3

Men's Light Heavyweight (– 81 kg)

- Roger Fortin
  1. First round – lost to Anatoliy Klimanov (URS), 0:5

== Cycling ==
Eleven cyclists represented Canada in 1976.

Individual road race

- Pierre Harvey – 4:49:01 (→ 24th place)
- Gilles Durand – 5:03:13 (→ 54th place)
- Tom Morris – did not finish (→ no ranking)
- Brian Chewter – did not finish (→ no ranking)

Team time trial

- Brian Chewter
- Marc Blouin
- Serge Proulx
- Tom Morris

Sprint

- Jocelyn Lovell – 1:08.852 (→ 13th place)

1000m time trial

- Gordon Singleton – 17th place

Team pursuit

- Ron Hayman
- Jocelyn Lovell
- Adrian Prosser
- Hugh Walton

== Fencing ==
13 fencers, 9 men and 4 women, represented Canada in 1976.

Men's foil

- Michel Dessureault
- Lehel Fekete

Men's épée

- Alain Dansereau
- George Varaljay
- Geza Tatrallyay

Men's team épée

- Alain Dansereau, Michel Dessureault, Geza Tatrallyay, George Varaljay

Men's sabre

- Marc Lavoie
- Eli Sukunda
- Peter Urban

Men's team sabre

- Marc Lavoie, Peter Urban, Imre Nagy, Eli Sukunda

Women's foil

- Chantal Payer
- Donna Hennyey
- Susan Stewart

Women's team foil

- Fleurette Campeau, Susan Stewart, Donna Hennyey, Chantal Payer

== Handball ==
Men's team competition

  - Wolfgang Blankenau
  - Christian Chagnon
  - François Dauphin
  - Hugues de Roussan
  - Pierre Désormeaux
  - Pierre Ferdais
  - Robert Johnson
  - Richard Lambert
  - Claude Lefebvre
  - Danny Power
  - Stan Thorseth
  - Luc Tousignant
  - Claude Viens
  - Pierre St. Martin

Head Coach: Slobodan Misic

Women's team competition

- Team roster
  - Lucie Balthazar
  - Louise Beaumont
  - Manon Charette
  - Danielle Chenard
  - Nicole Genier
  - Mariette Houle
  - Louise Hurtubise
  - Denise Lemaire
  - Francine Parizeau
  - Monique Prud'homme
  - Joanes Rail
  - Nicole Robert
  - Hélène Tétreault
  - Johanne Valois

== Hockey ==
Men's team competition

The Men's National Team from Canada competed for the second time at the Summer Olympics. The squad finished tenth in the McGill University's Molson Stadium in Montreal.

- Preliminary round (group A)
  - Lost to Australia (0–3)
  - Defeated Argentina (3–1)
  - Lost to India (0–3)
  - Lost to Malaysia (0–1)
  - Lost to the Netherlands (1–3)
- Classification matches
  - 9th/12th place: bye
  - 9th/10th place: lost to Belgium (2–3) → Tenth place
- Team roster
  - ( 1.) James MacDougall
  - ( 2.) Sarbjit Dusang
  - ( 3.) David Bissett
  - ( 4.) Alan Hobkirk
  - ( 5.) Reg Plummer
  - ( 6.) Lee Wright
  - ( 7.) Lance Carey
  - ( 8.) Peter Motzek
  - ( 9.) Doug Pready
  - (10.) Kelvin Wood
  - (11.) Peter Lown
  - (12.) Fred Hoos
  - (13.) Paul "Bubli" Chohan
  - (14.) Mike Mouat
  - (15.) Kuldip Gosal
  - (16.) Antoine Schouten
- Head coach: Errol Hartley

== Judo ==
Men's lightweight (– 73 kg)

- Brad Farrow

Men's Half-Middleweight (– 81 kg)

- Wayne Erdman

Men's middleweight (– 90 kg)

- Rainer Fischer

Men's half-heavyweight (– 100 kg)

- Joseph Meli

Men's Open Class

- Tom Greenway

== Modern pentathlon ==
Three male pentathletes represented Canada in 1976.

Individual

- John Hawes
- George Skene
- Jack Alexander

Team

- John Hawes
- George Skene
- Jack Alexander

== Volleyball ==
Men's team competition

- Preliminary round (group A)
  - Lost to Czechoslovakia (0–3)
  - Lost to Poland (0–3)
  - Lost to South Korea (0–3)
  - Lost to Cuba (0–3)
- Classification matches
  - No match after Egypt withdrew → Ninth place
- Team roster
  - Edward Alexiuk
  - Pierre Belanger
  - Thomas Graham
  - Kerry Klostermann
  - Donald Michalski
  - John Paulsen
  - Garth Pischke
  - Lawrence Plenert
  - Bruno Prasil
  - Elias Romanchych
  - Gregory Russell
  - Alan Taylor
- Head coach: William Neville

Women's team competition

- Preliminary round (group A)
  - Lost to Peru (2–3)
  - Lost to Hungary (1–3)
  - Lost to Japan (0–3)
- Classification matches
  - 5th/8th place: lost to Cuba (2–3)
  - 7th/8th place: lost to Peru (1–3) → 8th place
- Team roster
  - Regyna Armonas
  - Betty Baxter
  - Carole Bishop
  - Barbara Dalton
  - Mary Dempster
  - Kathy Girvan
  - Debbie Heeps
  - Anne Ireland
  - Connie Lebrun
  - Claire Lloyd
  - Patty Olson
  - Audrey Vandervelden
- Head coach: Moo Park

== Water polo ==
Men's team competition

- Team roster
  - Clifford Barry
  - David Hart
  - Dominique Dion
  - Gabor Csepregi
  - Gaétan Turcotte
  - Paul Pottier
  - George Gross
  - Guy Leclerc
  - Jim Ducharme
  - John MacLeod
  - Patrick Pugliese
  - Paul Mallet
