= Czechoslovakia at the 1976 Summer Olympics =

- IOC code: TCH
- NOC: Czechoslovak Olympic Committee

in Montreal
- Competitors: 163 (125 men and 38 women) in 16 sports
- Flag bearer: Ludvík Daněk
- Medals Ranked 17th: Gold 2 Silver 2 Bronze 4 Total 8

Summer Olympics appearances (overview)
- 1920; 1924; 1928; 1932; 1936; 1948; 1952; 1956; 1960; 1964; 1968; 1972; 1976; 1980; 1984; 1988; 1992

Other related appearances
- Bohemia (1900–1912); Czech Republic (1994–pres.); Slovakia (1994–pres.)

Czechoslovakia competed at the 1976 Summer Olympics in Montreal, Quebec, Canada. 163 competitors, 125 men and 38 women, took part in 79 events in 16 sports.

== Medalists ==
Medal	Name	Sport	Event
Gold	Anton Tkáč	Cycling	Men's sprint
Gold	Josef Panáček	Shooting	Mixed skeet
Silver	Jiří Adam; Jan Bártů; Bohumil Starnovský	Modern pentathlon	Men's team
Silver	Vítězslav Mácha	Wrestling	Men's Greco-Roman 74 kg
Bronze	Helena Fibingerová	Athletics	Women's shot put
Bronze	Jan Bártů	Modern pentathlon	Men's individual
Bronze	Jaroslav Hellebrand; Vladek Lacina; Zdeněk Pecka; Václav Vochoska	Rowing	Men's quadruple sculls
Bronze	Oldřich Svojanovský; Pavel Svojanovský; Ludvík Vébr	Rowing	Men's coxed pair

== Athletics ==
Men's Discus Throw

- Ludvík Daněk
  - Qualification — 60.44m
  - Final — 61.28m (→ 9th place)
- Josef Šilhavý
  - Qualification — 60.82m
  - Final — 58.42m (→ 13th place)

Women's Shot Put

- Helena Fibingerová
  - Final — 20.76 m (→ Bronze Medal)

== Basketball ==
Men's team competition

- Preliminary round (group B):
  - Defeated Egypt (103–64)
  - Lost to Yugoslavia (81-99)
  - Lost to Italy (69-79)
  - Defeated Puerto Rico (89-83)
  - Lost to United States (76-81)
- Classification Matches:
  - 5th/8th place: Defeated Cuba (91-79)
  - 5th/6th place: Lost to Italy (75-98) → Sixth place
- Team Roster
  - Vladimir Ptacek
  - Vojtech Petr
  - Jiri Konopasek
  - Justin Sedlak
  - Stanislav Kropilak
  - Jaroslav Kanturek
  - Zdenek Kos
  - Jiri Pospisil
  - Vladimir Padrta
  - Kamil Brabenec
  - Zdenek Dousa
  - Gustav Hraska
- Head coach: Vladimir Heger

Women's team competition

- Team Roster
  - Ludmila Kraliková
  - Dana Ptacková
  - Pavla Davidová
  - Ludmila Chmeliková
  - Martina Babková
  - Ivana Korinková
  - Ywetta Pollaková
  - Lenka Nechvatalová
  - Vlasta Vrbková
  - Marta Pechová
  - Hana Dousová
  - Bozena Miklosovicové
- Head coach: Jindrich Drasal

== Cycling ==
Eleven cyclists represented Czechoslovakia in 1976.

Individual road race

- Vlastimil Moravec — 4:49:01 (→ 13th place)
- Petr Bucháček — 4:54:26 (→ 41st place)
- Petr Matoušek — did not finish (→ no ranking)
- Vladimír Vondráček — did not finish (→ no ranking)

Team time trial

- Petr Bucháček
- Petr Matoušek
- Milan Puzrla
- Vladimír Vondráček

Sprint

- Anton Tkáč — Gold Medal

1000m time trial

- Miroslav Vymazal — 1:08.173 (→ 9th place)

Individual pursuit

- Michal Klasa — 8th place

Team pursuit

- Zdeněk Dohnal
- Michal Klasa
- Petr Kocek
- Jiří Pokorný

== Fencing ==
Three fencers, two men and one woman, represented Czechoslovakia in 1976.

Men's foil

- František Koukal
- Jaroslav Jurka

Men's épée

- Jaroslav Jurka

Women's foil

- Katarína Lokšová-Ráczová

== Modern pentathlon ==
Three male pentathletes represented Czechoslovakia in 1976. They won silver in the team event and Jan Bártů won an individual bronze.

Individual

- Jan Bártů
- Bohumil Starnovský
- Jiří Adam

Team

- Jan Bártů
- Bohumil Starnovský
- Jiří Adam

== Volleyball ==
Men's team competition

- Preliminary round (group A)
  - Defeated Canada (3-0)
  - Lost to Cuba (0-3)
  - Lost to Poland (1-3)
  - Defeated South Korea (3-1)
- Classification Matches
  - 5th/8th place: Defeated Italy (3-0)
  - 5th/6th place: Defeated South Korea (3-1) → Fifth place
- Team Roster
  - Miroslav Nekola
  - Jaroslav Penc
  - Stefan Pipa
  - Vladimír Petlák
  - Josef Mikunda
  - Jaroslav Stančo
  - Vlastimil Lenert
  - Milan Šlambor
  - Pavel Řeřábek
  - Josef Vondrka
  - Drahomír Koudelka
  - Jaroslav Tomáš
- Head coaches: Pavel Schenk and Zdeněk Václavík
