= Volleyball at the 1976 Summer Olympics – Men's team rosters =

Olympic volleyball rosters

The following teams and players took part in the men's volleyball tournament at the 1976 Summer Olympics, in Montreal.

== Brazil ==
The following volleyball players represented Brazil:

- Alexandre Abeid
- Antônio Carlos Moreno
- Bernard Rajzman
- Alexandre Kalache
- Elói de Oliveira
- Fernandão
- Suíço
- José Roberto Guimarães
- Bebeto de Freitas
- Paulo Peterle
- Sérgio Danilas
- William Carvalho da Silva

== Canada ==
The following volleyball players represented Canada:

- Ed Alexiuk
- Pierre Bélanger
- Tom Graham
- Kerry Klostermann
- Donald Michalski
- John Paulsen
- Garth Pischke
- Larry Plenert
- Bruno Prasil
- Elias Romanchych
- Gregory Russell
- Alan Taylor

Head coach: Bill Neville

== Cuba ==
The following volleyball players represented Cuba:

- Leonel Marshall Sr.
- Victoriano Sarmientos
- Ernesto Martínez
- Víctor García
- Carlos Salas
- Raúl Vilches
- Jesús Savigne
- Lorenzo Martínez
- Diego Lapera
- Antonio Rodríguez
- Alfredo Figueredo
- Jorge Pérez Vento

== Czechoslovakia ==
The following volleyball players represented Czechoslovakia:

- Jaroslav Penc
- Jaroslav Stančo
- Jaroslav Tomáš
- Josef Mikunda
- Josef Vondrka
- Milan Šlambor
- Miroslav Nekola
- Pavel Řeřábek
- Štefan Pipa
- Vladimír Petlák
- Vlastimil Lenert
- Drahomír Koudelka

== Egypt ==
The following volleyball players represented Egypt:

- Fouad Salam Alam
- Gaber Mooti Abou Zeid
- Hamid Mohamed Azim
- Ibrahim Fakhr El-Din
- Samir Loutfi El-Sayed
- Attia El-Sayed Aly
- Aysir Mohamed El-Zalabani
- Mahmoud Mohamed Farag
- Ihab Ibrahim Hussein
- Azmi Mohamed Megahed
- Metwali Mohamed
- Mohamed Saleh El-Shikshaki

== Italy ==
The following volleyball players represented Italy:

- Andrea Nannini
- Andrea Nencini
- Erasmo Salemme
- Fabrizio Nassi
- Francesco Dall'Olio
- Giorgio Goldoni
- Giovanni Lanfranco
- Marco Negri
- Mario Mattioli
- Paolo Montorsi
- Rodolfo Giovenzana
- Stefano Sibani

== Japan ==
The following volleyball players represented Japan:

- Katsumi Oda
- Katsutoshi Nekoda
- Kenji Shimaoka
- Mikiyasu Tanaka
- Seiji Oko
- Shoichi Yanagimoto
- Tadayoshi Yokota
- Takashi Maruyama
- Tetsuo Nishimoto
- Tetsuo Sato
- Yasunori Yasuda
- Yoshihide Fukao

== Poland ==
The following volleyball players represented Poland:

- Włodzimierz Stefański
- Bronisław Bebel
- Lech Łasko
- Edward Skorek
- Tomasz Wójtowicz
- Wiesław Gawłowski
- Mirosław Rybaczewski
- Zbigniew Lubiejewski
- Ryszard Bosek
- Włodzimierz Sadalski
- Zbigniew Zarzycki
- Marek Karbarz

== South Korea ==
The following volleyball players represented South Korea:

- Jo Jae-hak
- Jeong Mun-gyeong
- Gang Man-su
- Kim Chung-han
- Kim Geon-bong
- Lee In
- Lee Hui-won
- Lee Chun-pyo
- Lee Seon-gu
- Lee Yong-gwan
- Im Ho-dam
- Park Gi-won

== Soviet Union ==
The following volleyball players represented the Soviet Union:

- Anatoliy Polishchuk
- Vyacheslav Zaytsev
- Yefim Chulak
- Vladimir Dorokhov
- Aleksandr Yermilov
- Pāvels Seļivanovs
- Oleh Molyboha
- Vladimir Kondra
- Yury Starunsky
- Vladimir Chernyshov
- Vladimir Ulanov
- Aleksandr Savin
