= Basketball at the 1976 Summer Olympics – Women's team rosters =

Olympic basketball rosters

Six women's teams competed in basketball at the 1976 Summer Olympics.

== Bulgaria ==
The following players represented Bulgaria:

- Nadka Golcheva
- Penka Metodieva
- Petkana Makaveeva
- Snezhana Mikhaylova
- Krasimira Gyurova
- Krasimira Bogdanova
- Todorka Yordanova
- Diana Dilova
- Margarita Shtarkelova
- Mariya Stoyanova
- Gergina Skerlatova
- Penka Stoyanova
- Head coach: Ivan Galabov

== Canada ==
The following players represented Canada:

- Angela Johnson
- Anne Hurley
- Bev Barnes
- Beverley Bland
- Carol Turney
- Chris Critelli
- Coleen Dufresne
- Donna Hobin
- Joanne Sargent
- Joyce Douthwright
- Sheila Strike
- Sylvia Sweeney
- Head coach: Brian Heaney

== Czechoslovakia ==
The following players represented Czechoslovakia:

- Božena Miklošovičová
- Dana Ptáčková
- Hana Doušová
- Ivana Kořinková
- Lenka Nechvátalová
- Ľudmila Chmelíková
- Ľudmila Králiková
- Marta Pechová
- Martina Babková
- Pavla Davidová
- Vlasta Vrbková
- Yvetta Polláková
- Head coach: Jindrich Drasal

== Japan ==
The following players represented Japan:

- Kazuko Kadoya
- Kazuyo Hayashida
- Keiko Namai
- Kimi Wakitashiro
- Kimiko Hashimoto
- Mieko Fukui
- Miho Matsuoka
- Misako Satake
- Miyako Otsuka
- Reiko Aonuma
- Sachiyo Yamamoto
- Teruko Miyamoto
- Head coach: Masatoshi Ozaki

== Soviet Union ==
The following players represented the Soviet Union:

- Angelė Rupšienė
- Tetiana Zakharova-Nadyrova
- Raisa Kurvyakova
- Olga Barysheva
- Tatyana Ovechkina
- Nadezhda Shuvayena
- Uljana Semjonova
- Nadezhda Zakharova
- Nelly Feriabnikova
- Olga Sukharnova
- Tamāra Dauniene
- Natalya Klimova
- Head coach: Lydia Alexeeva

== United States ==
The following players represented the United States:

- Cindy Brogdon
- Susan Rojcewicz
- Ann Meyers
- Lusia Harris
- Nancy Dunkle
- Charlotte Lewis
- Nancy Lieberman
- Gail Marquis
- Patricia Roberts
- Mary Anne O'Connor
- Patricia Head
- Juliene Simpson
- Head coach: Billie Moore
