= Czechoslovak Basketball League =

- Founded: 1929
- First season: 1929–30
- Folded: 1993
- Country: Czechoslovakia
- Level on pyramid: 1st Tier (Czechoslovakia)
- Last champions: Baník Cigel' Prievidza (2nd title)
- Most championships: Brno (21 titles)
- All-time top scorer: Jiří Zídek Sr. (10,838)

The Czechoslovak Basketball League (abbreviation CSBL) was the highest level professional club basketball competition for men in Czechoslovakia. Its successor national league in the Czech Republic became the Mattoni NBL, and its successor national league in Slovakia became the Extraliga.

== History ==
- 1929–30 to 1938–39 Provincial League of Bohemia and Moravia
- 1939–40 to 1944–45 Provincial League of Protectorate
- 1945–46 to 1992–93 Czechoslovak Basketball League

== Title holders ==
- 1929–30 YMCA Praha
- 1931 YMCA Praha
- 1932 YMCA Praha
- 1932–33 YMCA Praha
- 1933–34 YMCA Praha
- 1934–35 YMCA Praha
- 1935–36 YMCA Praha
- 1936–37 Uncas Praha
- 1937–38 Uncas Praha
- 1938–39 Královo Pole Brno
- 1939–40 Sparta Praha
- 1940–41 Sokol Praha
- 1941–42 Brno Žabovřesky
- 1942–43 Brno Žabovřesky
- 1943–44 Uncas Praha
- 1944–45 Uncas Praha
- 1945–46 Sokol I Brno
- 1946–47 Uncas Praha
- 1947 Sokol I Brno
- 1947–48 Sokol I Brno
- 1948 Sokol I Brno
- 1948–49 Sokol I Brno
- 1949–50 Sokol I Brno
- 1950–51 Sokol I Brno
- 1951 Spartak ZJŠ Brno
- 1952 Slavia Brno
- 1953 Slavia Brno
- 1953–54 ÚDA Praha
- 1954–55 ÚDA Praha
- 1955–56 ÚDA Praha
- 1956–57 Slovan Orbis Praha
- 1957–58 Spartak ZJŠ Brno
- 1958–59 Slovan Orbis Praha
- 1959–60 Spartak Praha Sokolovo
- 1960–61 Iskra Svit
- 1961–62 Spartak ZJŠ Brno
- 1962–63 Spartak ZJŠ Brno
- 1963–64 Spartak ZJŠ Brno
- 1964–65 Slavia VŠ Praha
- 1965–66 Slavia VŠ Praha
- 1966–67 Spartak ZJŠ Brno
- 1967–68 Spartak ZJŠ Brno
- 1968–69 Slavia VŠ Praha
- 1969–70 Slavia VŠ Praha
- 1970–71 Slavia VŠ Praha
- 1971–72 Slavia VŠ Praha
- 1972–73 Dukla Olomouc
- 1973–74 Slavia VŠ Praha
- 1974–75 Dukla Olomouc
- 1975–76 Spartak ZJŠ Brno
- 1976–77 Spartak-Zbrojovka Brno
- 1977–78 Zbrojovka Brno
- 1978–79 Inter Slovnaft
- 1979–80 Inter Slovnaft
- 1980–81 Slavia VŠ Praha
- 1981–82 Slavia VŠ Praha
- 1982–83 Inter Slovnaft
- 1983–84 Rudá hvězda Pardubice
- 1984–85 Inter Slovnaft
- 1985–86 Zbrojovka Brno
- 1986–87 Zbrojovka Brno
- 1987–88 Zbrojovka Brno
- 1988–89 Baník Cigel' Prievidza
- 1989–90 Zbrojovka Brno
- 1990–91 VŠ Praha
- 1991–92 USK Praha
- 1992–93 Baník Cigel' Prievidza

== Performance by club ==
Club	Championships	Winning years
Brno	21	1945–46, 1947, 1947–48, 1948, 1948–49, 1949–50, 1950–51, 1951, 1957–58, 1961–62, 1962–63, 1963–64, 1966–67, 1967–68, 1975–76, 1976–77, 1977–78, 1985–86, 1986–87, 1987–88, 1989–90
Uncas Praha	12	1929–30, 1931, 1932, 1932–33, 1933–34, 1934–35, 1935–36, 1936–37, 1937–38, 1943–44, 1944–45, 1946–47
USK Praha	11	1964–65, 1965–66, 1968–69, 1969–70, 1970–71, 1971–72, 1973–74, 1980–81, 1981–82, 1990–91, 1991–92
Inter Bratislava	4	1978–79, 1979–80, 1982–83, 1984–85
Dukla Praha	3	1953–54, 1954–55, 1955–56
Žabovřesky	2	1941–42, 1942–43
Slavia Brno	2	1952, 1953
Slovan Orbis Praha	2	1956–57, 1958–59
Sparta Praha	2	1939–40, 1959–60
Dukla Olomouc	2	1972–73, 1974–75
Prievidza	2	1988–89, 1992–93
Královo Pole Brno	1	1938–39
Sokol Praha	1	1940–41
Iskra Svit	1	1960–61
Pardubice	1	1983–84

== Performance by province ==
Province	Championships
Bohemia	30
Moravia	27
Slovakia	7

== Playoff Finals ==
Season	Home court advantage	Result	Home court disadvantage	1st of Regular Season	Record
1983–84	Nová huť Ostrava	1–2	Rudá hvězda Pardubice	Zbrojovka Brno	16–8
1984–85	Inter Slovnaft	2–1	Chemosvit	Inter Slovnaft	19–5
1985–86	Nová huť Ostrava	1–2	Zbrojovka Brno	Nová huť Ostrava	20–4
1986–87	Zbrojovka Brno	3–0	Nová huť Ostrava	Zbrojovka Brno	28–4
1987–88	Zbrojovka Brno	3–2	Inter Slovnaft	Zbrojovka Brno	22–6
1988–89	Baník Cígeľ Prievidza	3–1	Sparta Praha	Baník Cígeľ Prievidza	23–11
1989–90	Zbrojovka Brno	3–2	Sparta Praha	Zbrojovka Brno	26–10
1990–91	VŠ Praha	3–1	Sparta Praha	VŠ Praha	35–5
1991–92	USK Praha	3–0	Baník Cígeľ Prievidza	USK Praha	35–9
1992–93	Baník Cígeľ Prievidza		USK Praha	Baník Cígeľ Prievidza	23–7

== Historical players ==
- Jiří Zídek Sr.
- Kamil Brabenec
- Jan Bobrovský
- Zdeněk Douša
- Gustáv Hraška
- Jaroslav Skála
- Jiří Zedníček
- Stanislav Kropilák
- Jiří Pospíšil
- Vlastimil Havlík
- Vojtěch Petr
- Zdeněk Kos
- Vladimír Padrta
- Dušan Lukášik
- František Konvička
- Vlastibor Klimeš
- Jan Blažek
- Peter Rajniak
- Jaroslav Kantůrek
- Jiří Růžička
- Oto Matický
- Justin Sedlák
- Robert Mifka
- Pavol Bojanovský
- Leoš Krejčí
- Vladimír Ptáček
- Dušan Žáček
- Jaroslav Tetiva
- Jiří Okáč
- Jiří Ammer
- Boris Lukášik
- Igor Vraniak
- Bohumil Tomášek
- Jaroslav Kovář
- Petr Novický
- Vladimír Pištělák
- Zdeněk Böhm
- Josef Jelínek
- Jan Svoboda
- Petr Czudek
- Richard Petruška
- Štefan Svitek
- Ivan Mrázek
- Jiří Baumruk
- Jaroslav Šíp
- Ladislav Trpkoš
- Miroslav Škeřík
- Zdeněk Bobrovský
- Emil Velenský
- Jiří "George" Zídek Jr.
- Jan Kozák
- Josef Ezr
- Zdeněk Rylich
- Juraj Žuffa
- Karel Baroch
- Milan Voračka
- Jiří Konopásek
- Jaroslav Křivý
- Jozef Michalko
- Vladimír Vyoral
- Michal Ježdík
- Václav Hrubý
- Pavel Bečka
- Stanislav Kameník
- Marian Kotleba
- Ivan Chrenka
- Peter Chrenka
- Marek Andruška

== See also ==
- Czech Republic Basketball League
- Slovakian Basketball League

== Sources ==
- CZECHOSLOVAKIA List of champions on apbr.org
