= Czechoslovakia men's national basketball team =

Czechoslovakia
- FIBA ranking: Defunct
- Joined FIBA: 1932; 94 years ago (co-founders)
- FIBA zone: FIBA Europe
- National federation: ČSBF

Olympic Games
- Appearances: 7
- Medals: None

FIBA World Cup
- Appearances: 4
- Medals: None

EuroBasket
- Appearances: 24
- Medals: (gold) Gold: (1946) (silver) Silver: (1947, 1951, 1955, 1959, 1967, 1985) (bronze) Bronze: (1935, 1957, 1969, 1977, 1981)
| Home | Away |

The Czechoslovakia national basketball team (Czech: Československá basketbalová reprezentace, Slovak: Československé národné basketbalové mužstvo) represented Czechoslovakia in international basketball from 1932 to 1992. After the Dissolution of Czechoslovakia in 1993, the Czech Republic and Slovakia set up their own national teams. Both teams are recognized as the successor to the Czechoslovak team.

== Medals ==
- EuroBasket 1935 – (bronze) Bronze medal
- EuroBasket 1946 – (gold) Champions
- EuroBasket 1947 – (silver) Silver medal
- EuroBasket 1951 – (silver) Silver medal
- EuroBasket 1955 – (silver) Silver medal
- EuroBasket 1957 – (bronze) Bronze medal
- EuroBasket 1959 – (silver) Silver medal
- EuroBasket 1967 – (silver) Silver medal
- EuroBasket 1969 – (bronze) Bronze medal
- EuroBasket 1977 – (bronze) Bronze medal
- EuroBasket 1981 – (bronze) Bronze medal
- EuroBasket 1985 – (silver) Silver medal

== History ==
=== EuroBasket 1935 ===
The Czechoslovak side came in third place at the first European basketball championship, the EuroBasket 1935 held by the International Basketball Federation's FIBA Europe continental federation. They defeated France in the preliminary round to advance to the semifinals. There they lost to Spain, resulting in a playoff for third place with Switzerland which the Czechoslovaks won 25–23.

=== EuroBasket 1937 ===
In the EuroBasket 1937 competition, the Czechoslovaks finished seventh of eight teams. Their preliminary group included the powerful French, Polish, and Latvian teams, each of which defeated Czechoslovakia in the preliminary round. The Czechoslovaks then faced Estonia in the classification semifinals, losing again. Their final match was against Egypt in the 7th/8th playoff; since Egypt had withdrawn during preliminary play, Czechoslovakia received their only win by default.

=== EuroBasket 1946 ===
Czechoslovakia returned to European competition with EuroBasket 1946. They started off well in a tournament notably lacking the Baltic countries that had dominated the pre-war competitions. Defeating Switzerland and then Belgium, the Czechoslovak team placed first in the preliminary round group of three. They moved on to the semifinal round, facing the Hungarians. A 42–28 win secured a place in the championship game for Czechoslovakia. In that game, they played the undefeated Italy. After training 18–21 at halftime, Czechoslovakia came back to win the game 34–32 to win their first European championship.

=== EuroBasket 1947 ===
Defending champions and tournament hosts Czechoslovakia started off well again at EuroBasket 1947, winning all three of their preliminary round matches and then all three of their semifinal round matches. This put them in their first match up against the Soviet Union in the championship game. In the first of five championship game matches between the European titans, Czechoslovakia lost 56–37 to finish with a silver medal.

=== EuroBasket 1951 ===
Czechoslovakia did not compete at EuroBasket 1949 in Cairo, returning to the European championships at EuroBasket 1951 in Paris. They endured some hardship in the tournament, losing to Belgium in the preliminary round to finish the round 2–1 and second-ranked of the four teams in the pool. This was sufficient to advance to the semifinal round, however. There, they faced the dominant Soviet Union, losing their second game of the tournament and again finishing second of four in the pool with a 2–1 record. This put them in a match up against the first-ranked team from the opposite pool, hosts France. Czechoslovakia won 59–50, advancing to the final, a rematch against the Soviets.

In what was by far the closest game the Soviets had yet endured in European play, Czechoslovakia managed to bring the game to a 44–44 tie with 1 second remaining to play before fouling Ilmar Kullam and sending him to the free throw line to attempt a free throw. Kullam made the shot, but one of the referees gave an initial signal that he had stepped on the line during the attempt and that therefore the shot did not count. Consultation with another referee eventually resulted in the point being allowed, and Czechoslovakia lost its second championship game to the Soviet Union 45–44.

=== EuroBasket 1953 ===
After placing in the top two in each of their last three appearances, the fourth-place finish that Czechoslovakia earned at EuroBasket 1953 in Moscow was somewhat of a disappointment. However, the difference between 2nd and 5th in 1953 was a 4-way tie-breaker, in which the Czechoslovakia squad had gotten the third spot for fourth place overall.

The preliminary round posed little difficulty, with Czechoslovakia winning all three games. The final round, however, saw Czechoslovakia lose close matches to Israel and Yugoslavia, as well as the Soviet squad, on their way to a 4–3 record in the final round. This put Czechoslovakia on an equal footing with Hungary, France national basketball team, and Italy in a tie for second behind the Soviets. Despite Czechoslovakia having beaten Hungary and France, both teams came about above Czechoslovakia in the final standings, while Israel was dropped to fifth place.

=== EuroBasket 1955 ===
In Budapest for the EuroBasket 1955 competition, the Czechoslovakia team found itself slaying giants but falling to less vaunted opponents. They had little difficulty in the preliminary round, going 3–0 to advance to the final pool. There, Czechoslovakia defeated powerful Hungary, in Hungary's only loss of the final round on their way to the gold medal, but also gave Yugoslavia the only win the Yugoslavian team would get in the final round as Czechoslovakia fell 52–49 to the eventual 8th-place finishers. A third-round loss to Poland made the round robin look bleak for the Czechoslovak team, as they were already down to 1–2 and had yet to face the Soviet Union, which had yet to lose a game in 4 tournaments and 31 matches.

Nevertheless, Czechoslovakia defeated the Soviets 81–74 in a surprising match. They then won their next three games, finishing in second place with the silver medal and a 5–2, edging out the Soviets who were also 5–2 after losing to Hungary in their sixth match. Czechoslovakia had managed to defeat both the gold medallists and bronze medallists, meanwhile losing to teams that finished 5th and 8th.

=== EuroBasket 1957 ===
Sofia was the location of Czechoslovakia's next European tournament entry, EuroBasket 1957. They had little difficulty in the preliminary round, winning each of their three games by 18 points or more. In the final round, Czechoslovakia met with Bulgaria and Soviet Union in the second and third matches of the 7-game round robin, losing those two to drop to an early 1–2 record. However, none of the other teams in the final round could match the Czechoslovakia squad, and the team finished at 5–2 with a bronze medal behind the Bulgarians and Soviets. Czechoslovak player Jiří Baumruk was named MVP.

== Statistics ==
=== Top career caps ===
Players with the most caps (total games played):

| Rank | Player | Caps (Total Games Played) |
|---|---|---|
| 1. | Kamil Brabenec | 403 |
| 2. | Vlastimil Havlík | 370 |
| 3. | Stanislav Kropilák | 368 |
| 4. | Zdeněk Kos | 345 |
| 5. | Gustáv Hraška | 336 |
| 6. | Jaroslav Skála | 333 |
| 7. | Jiří Pospíšil | 276 |
| 8. | Jan Bobrovský | 267 |
| 9. | Jiří Zídek Sr. | 257 |
| 10. | Peter Rajniak | 255 |
| 11. | Vojtěch Petr | 251 |
| 12. | Zdeněk Böhm | 250 |
| 13. | Zdeněk Douša | 246 |
| 14. | Juraj Žuffa | 241 |
| 15. | Jiří Růžička | 240 |
| 16. | Vlastibor Klimeš | 234 |
| 17. | Jiří Okáč | 230 |
| 18. | Oto Matický | 224 |
| 19. | Leoš Krejčí | 219 |
| 20. | Jiří Zedníček | 217 |
| 21. | František Konvička | 216 |
| 22. | Bohumil Tomášek | 205 |
| 23. | Vladimír Pištělák | 203 |

==== Top 20 career scorers ====
Includes total points scored in only games played at the FIBA Pre-Olympic Tournament, the FIBA European Olympic Qualifying Tournament, the Summer Olympics, the FIBA World Cup, and the FIBA EuroBasket.

| Rank | Player | Points Scored | Caps | Points Per Game |
|---|---|---|---|---|
| 1. | Kamil Brabenec | 1,939 | 122 | 15.9 |
| 2. | Stanislav Kropilák | 1,382 | 92 | 15.0 |
| 3. | Jiří Zídek Sr. | 1,230 | 87 | 14.1 |
| 4. | Zdeněk Kos | 1,150 | 113 | 10.2 |
| 5. | Jiří Pospíšil | 791 | 85 | 9.3 |
| 6. | Gustáv Hraška | 761 | 91 | 8.4 |
| 7. | Jan Bobrovský | 748 | 78 | 9.6 |
| 8. | Jiří Baumruk | 654 | 55 | 11.9 |
| 9. | František Konvička | 654 | 61 | 10.7 |
| 10. | Ivan Mrázek | 629 | 50 | 12.6 |
| 11. | Jiří Zedníček | 624 | 66 | 9.5 |
| 12. | Jaroslav Skála | 574 | 69 | 8.3 |
| 13. | Jaroslav Šíp | 485 | 43 | 11.3 |
| 14. | Jiří Růžička | 478 | 66 | 7.2 |
| 15. | Miroslav Škeřík | 477 | 49 | 9.7 |
| 16. | Jaroslav Tetiva | 473 | 62 | 7.6 |
| 17. | Vlastimil Havlík | 471 | 62 | 7.6 |
| 18. | Zdeněk Douša | 434 | 71 | 6.1 |
| 19. | Bohumil Tomášek | 417 | 46 | 9.1 |
| 20. | Peter Rajniak | 408 | 40 | 10.2 |

== Rosters ==
1935 FIBA EuroBasket: finished 3rd among 10 teams

Jiří Čtyřoký, Jan Feřtek, Josef Franc, Josef Klíma, Josef Moc, František Picek, Václav Voves

1936 Summer Olympic Games: finished 11th among 21 teams

Jiří Čtyřoký, Josef Klíma, František Picek, Josef Moc, Karel Kuhn, Ladislav Prokop, Ladislav Trpkoš, Hubert Prokop

1937 FIBA EuroBasket: finished 7th among 8 teams

Jan Kozák, Josef Klíma, Ladislav Prokop, Josef Bartoníček, Ludvík Dvořáček, Silverius Labohý, Zdeněk Scholler, Bertan Štorkán (Head coach: František Marek)

1939 FIBA EuroBasket: did not participate

1946 FIBA EuroBasket: finished 1st among 10 teams

Ivan Mrázek, Gustáv Hermann, Miloš Bobocký, Jiří Drvota, Josef Ezr, Ján Hluchý, Josef Křepela, Pavel Nerad, Ladislav Šimáček, František Stibitz, Josef Toms, Ladislav Trpkoš, Emil Velenský, Miroslav Vondráček (Head coach: František Hájek)

1947 FIBA EuroBasket: finished 2nd among 14 teams

Ivan Mrázek, Jiří Drvota, Gustáv Hermann, Miloš Bobocký, Jan Kozák, Josef Ezr, Karel Bělohradský, Miroslav Dostál, Milan Fráňa, Václav Krása, Josef Toms, Ladislav Trpkoš, Emil Velenský, Miroslav Vondráček (Head coach: Josef Fleischlinger)

1948 Summer Olympic Games: finished 7th among 23 teams

Ivan Mrázek, Jan Kozák, Josef Ezr, Jiří Drvota, Karel Bělohradský, Ctirad Benáček, Zdeněk Chlup, Jozef Kalina, Václav Krása, Zoltán Krenický, Josef Křepela, Jiří Siegel, Josef Toms, Ladislav Trpkoš

1949 FIBA EuroBasket: did not participate

1950 FIBA World Championship: did not participate

1951 FIBA EuroBasket: finished 2nd among 17 teams

Ivan Mrázek, Miroslav Škeřík, Jiří Baumruk, Jaroslav Šíp, Zdeněk Bobrovský, Jan Kozák, Zdeněk Rylich, Miroslav Baumruk, Zoltán Krenický, Karel Belohradsky, Jindřich Kinský, Jiří Matoušek, Miloš Nebuchla, Arnošt Novák, Karel Sobota, Stanislav Vykydal (Head coach: Josef Andrle)

1952 Summer Olympic Games: finished 10th among 23 teams

Ivan Mrázek, Miroslav Škeřík, Jiří Baumruk, Jaroslav Šíp, Zdeněk Bobrovský, Jan Kozák, Zdeněk Rylich, Miroslav Baumruk, Jiří Matoušek, Eugen Horniak, Jaroslav Tetiva, Josef Ezr, Lubomír Kolář, Miloslav Kodl

1953 FIBA EuroBasket: finished 4th among 17 teams

Ivan Mrázek, Jiří Baumruk, Zdeněk Bobrovský, Jan Kozák, Miroslav Škeřík, Zdeněk Rylich, Radoslav Šíp, Jaroslav Tetiva, Jaroslav Šíp, Jindřich Kinský, Eugen Horniak, Rudolf Stanček, Lubomir Kolář (Head coach: Lubomír Dobrý)

1954 FIBA World Championship: did not participate

1955 FIBA EuroBasket: finished 2nd among 18 teams

Ivan Mrázek, Jiří Baumruk, Zdeněk Bobrovský, Miroslav Škeřík, Jaroslav Šíp, Zdeněk Rylich, Jaroslav Tetiva, Radoslav Sís, Eugen Horniak, Jan Kozák, Lubomír Kolář, Dušan Lukášik, Jiří Matoušek, Milan Merkl (Head coach: Josef Fleischlinger)

1956 Summer Olympic Games: did not participate

1957 FIBA EuroBasket: finished 3rd among 16 teams

Jiří Baumruk, Miroslav Škeřík, Zdeněk Bobrovský, Jaroslav Šíp, Zdeněk Rylich, Lubomír Kolář, Dušan Lukášik, Jaroslav Chocholáč, Milan Merkl, Nikolaj Ordnung, Jaroslav Tetiva, Jiří Tetiva (Head coach: Gustáv Hermann)

1959 FIBA EuroBasket: finished 2nd among 17 teams

Jiří Baumruk, František Konvička, Bohumil Tomášek, Jaroslav Křivý, Miroslav Škeřík, Jaroslav Šíp, Boris Lukášik, Dušan Lukášik, Zdeněk Rylich, Jiří Šťastný, Jaroslav Tetiva, Bohuslav Rylich (Head coach: Gustáv Hermann)

1959 FIBA World Championship: did not participate

1960 Summer Olympic Games: finished 5th among 16 teams

Jiří Baumruk, František Konvička, Vladimír Pištělák, Bohumil Tomášek, Zdeněk Bobrovský, Jiří Tetiva, Boris Lukášik, Jiří Šťastný, Bohuslav Rylich, Jan Kinský, Dušan Lukášik, Zdeněk Konečný (Head coach: Ivan Mrázek)

1961 FIBA EuroBasket: finished 5th among 19 teams

František Konvička, Vladimír Pištělák, Jiří Baumruk, Zdeněk Bobrovský, Bohumil Tomášek, Bohuslav Rylich, Jaroslav Tetiva, František Pokorný, Zdeněk Konečný, Jiří Marek, Miloš Pražák, Vladimír Lodr (Head coach: L. Krnáč)

1963 FIBA EuroBasket: finished 10th among 16 teams

Jiří Zídek, Jan Bobrovský, František Konvička, Vladimír Pištělák, Bohumil Tomášek, Jiří Růžička, Robert Mifka, Boris Lukášik, Bohuslav Rylich, Zdeněk Konečný, Jaroslav Tetiva, Miloš Pražák (Head coach: Ivan Mrázek)

1963 FIBA World Championship: did not participate

1964 Summer Olympic Games: did not participate

1965 FIBA EuroBasket: finished 7th among 16 teams

Jiří Zídek, František Konvička, Jan Bobrovský, Jiří Růžička, Vladimír Pištělák, Robert Mifka, Jiří Zedníček, Bohumil Tomášek, Jiří Ammer, Jiří Šťastný, Karel Baroch, Zdeněk Hummel (Head coach: Vladimír Heger)

1967 FIBA EuroBasket: finished 2nd among 16 teams

Jiří Zídek, Vladimír Pištělák, František Konvička, Jan Bobrovský, Jiří Zedníček, Jiří Růžička, Bohumil Tomášek, Jiří Ammer, Robert Mifka, Karel Baroch, Jiří Marek, Celestýn Mrázek (Head coach: Vladimír Heger)

1967 FIBA World Championship: did not participate

1968 Summer Olympic Games: did not participate

1969 FIBA EuroBasket: finished 3rd among 12 teams

Jiří Zídek, Jan Bobrovský, Jiří Zedníček, František Konvička, Vladimír Pištělák, Jiří Ammer, Robert Mifka, Jiří Růžička, Karel Baroch, Jiří Konopásek, Petr Novický, Jan Blažek (Head coach: Nikolaj Ordnung)

1970 FIBA World Championship: finished 6th among 13 teams

Jiří Zídek, Jan Bobrovský, Robert Mifka, Jiří Ammer, Jiří Zedníček, Jiří Růžička, Petr Novický, Jaroslav Kovář, Jiří Konopásek, Jiří Pospíšil, Milan Voračka, Zdeněk Douša (Head coach: Nikolaj Ordnung)

1971 FIBA EuroBasket: finished 5th among 12 teams

Kamil Brabenec, Jiří Zídek, Zdeněk Kos, Jan Bobrovský, Jiří Zedníček, Jiří Růžička, Karel Baroch, Petr Novický, Jiří Konopásek, Jiří Pospíšil, Bronislav Sako (Head coach: Nikolaj Ordnung)

1972 Summer Olympic Games: finished 8th among 16 teams

Kamil Brabenec, Zdeněk Kos, Jiří Zídek, Jiří Zedníček, Jiří Růžička, Petr Novický, Jiří Konopásek, Zdeněk Douša, Jiří Pospíšil, Jan Blažek, Jiří Balaštík (Head coach: Vladimír Heger)

1973 FIBA EuroBasket: finished 4th among 12 teams

Kamil Brabenec, Jiří Zedníček, Jan Bobrovský, Zdeněk Kos, Jiří Zídek, Petr Novický, Josef Klíma, Jiří Pospíšil, Jan Blažek, Vojtěch Petr, Jiří Balaštík, Gustav Hraška (Head coach: Vladimir Heger)

1974 FIBA World Championship: finished 10th among 14 teams

Kamil Brabenec, Jan Bobrovský, Jiří Zedníček, Zdeněk Kos, Jiří Zídek, Zdeněk Douša, Vojtěch Petr, Jaroslav Skála, Jaroslav Beránek, Pavel Pekárek, Zdeněk Hummel, Gustav Hraška (Head coach: Vladimír Heger)

1975 FIBA EuroBasket: finished 6th among 12 teams

Stanislav Kropilák, Kamil Brabenec, Zdeněk Kos, Jiří Pospíšil, Jaroslav Skála, Zdeněk Douša, Gustav Hraška, Vlastimil Klimeš, Jaroslav Beránek, Jaroslav Kantůrek, Josef Nečas, Jiří Štauch (Head coach: Vladimír Heger)

1976 Summer Olympic Games: finished 6th among 12 teams

Stanislav Kropilák, Kamil Brabenec, Zdeněk Kos, Jiří Konopásek, Jiří Pospíšil, Vojtěch Petr, Zdeněk Douša, Gustav Hraška, Jaroslav Kantůrek, Vladimír Ptáček, Justin Sedlák, Vladimír Padrta (Head coach: Vladimír Heger)

1977 FIBA EuroBasket: finished 3rd among 12 teams

Kamil Brabenec, Stanislav Kropilák, Zdeněk Kos, Jiří Pospíšil, Vlastimil Klimeš, Zdeněk Douša, Gustav Hraška, Josef Nečas, Vojtěch Petr, Jiří Konopásek, Vladimír Ptáček, Pavol Bojanovský (Head coach: Pavel Petera)

1978 FIBA World Championship: finished 9th among 14 teams

Stanislav Kropilák, Kamil Brabenec, Zdeněk Kos, Jiří Pospíšil, Zdeněk Douša, Vojtěch Petr, Gustav Hraška, Vlastimil Klimeš, Vladimír Ptáček, Vlastimil Havlík, Pavol Bojanovský, Marian Kotleba (Head coach: Pavel Petera)

1979 FIBA EuroBasket: finished 4th among 12 teams

Kamil Brabenec, Zdeněk Kos, Stanislav Kropilák, Vojtěch Petr, Jiří Pospíšil, Vlastimil Klimeš, Gustav Hraška, Zdeněk Douša, Jaroslav Skála, Vlastimil Havlík, Zdeněk Böhm, Peter Rajniak (Head coach: Pavel Petera)

1980 Summer Olympic Games: finished 9th among 12 teams

Kamil Brabenec, Stanislav Kropilák, Jaroslav Skála, Zdeněk Kos, Jiří Pospíšil, Gustav Hraška, Vlastimil Havlík, Pavol Bojanovský, Vlastimil Klimeš, Zdeněk Douša, Dušan Žáček, Peter Rajniak (Head coach: Pavel Petera)

1981 FIBA EuroBasket: finished 3rd among 12 teams

Zdeněk Kos, Kamil Brabenec, Stanislav Kropilák, Jaroslav Skála, Vojtěch Petr, Gustav Hraška, Vlastimil Klimeš, Zdeněk Böhm, Vlastimil Havlík, Peter Rajniak, Juraj Žuffa, Justin Sedlak (Head coach: Pavel Petera)

1982 FIBA World Championship: finished 10th among 13 teams

Stanislav Kropilák, Zdeněk Kos, Vojtěch Petr, Gustav Hraška, Jaroslav Skála, Vlastimil Havlík, Zdeněk Böhm, Vlastimil Klimeš, Juraj Žuffa, Peter Rajniak, Vladimír Ptáček, Dušan Žáček (Head coach: Pavel Petera)

1983 FIBA EuroBasket: finished 10th among 12 teams

Stanislav Kropilák, Jiří Okáč, Jaroslav Skála, Vojtěch Petr, Gustav Hraška, Zdeněk Böhm, Vlastimil Havlík, Juraj Žuffa, Vladimír Ptáček, Peter Rajniak, Blažej Mašura, Jiří Jandák (Head coach: Pavel Petera)

1984 Summer Olympic Games: did not participate

1985 FIBA EuroBasket: finished 2nd among 12 teams

Kamil Brabenec, Stanislav Kropilák, Jiří Okáč, Zdeněk Böhm, Vlastimil Havlík, Jaroslav Skála, Juraj Žuffa, Oto Matický, Peter Rajniak, Igor Vraniak, Vladimír Vyoral, Leoš Krejčí (Head coach: Pavel Petera)

1986 FIBA World Championship: did not participate

1987 FIBA EuroBasket: finished 8th among 12 teams

Kamil Brabenec, Stanislav Kropilák, Jiří Okáč, Oto Matický, Vlastimil Havlík, Jaroslav Skála, Juraj Žuffa, Peter Rajniak, Josef Jelínek, Jozef Michalko, Leoš Krejčí, Štefan Svitek (Head coach: Pavel Petera)

1988 Summer Olympic Games: did not participate

1989 FIBA EuroBasket: did not participate

1990 FIBA World Championship: did not participate

1991 FIBA EuroBasket: finished 6th among 8 teams

Jiří Okáč, Richard Petruška, Václav Hrubý, Jozef Michalko, Leoš Krejčí, Július Michalík, Pavel Bečka, Jan Svoboda, Vladimír Vyoral, Štefan Svitek, Michal Ježdík, Stanislav Kameník (Head coach: Jan Bobrovský)

== See also ==
- FIBA Hall of Fame
- FIBA EuroBasket Honors
