= Ptáček =

Ptáček (feminine: Ptáčková) is a Czech surname, meaning 'little bird'. Notable people with the surname include:

- Adam Ptáček (born 1980), Czech pole vaulter
- Anna Ptáčková (1858–1906), Czech suffragette and feminist
- Bob Ptacek (born 1937), American-Canadian football quarterback
- Dana Ptáčková (born 1952), Czech basketball player
- Fátima Ptacek (born 2000), American actress and model
- František Ptáček (born 1975), Czech ice hockey player
- Hynce Ptáček of Pirkštejn (1404–1444), Czech nobleman
- Kathryn Ptacek (born 1952), American writer and editor
- Louis Ptáček, American neurologist
- Rainer Ptacek (1951–1997), American guitarist and singer-songwriter
- Vladimír Ptáček (1954–2019), Czech basketball player

== See also ==
- Pták
- Ptak
