= Best Czech Player of the 20th Century =

The Czech Basketball Federation and Association of League Clubs pronounced the public inquiry about the best Czech basketball men's players of the last century. Voting of fans, journalists, and experts decided winners of the public inquiry. Results were announced by the festive occasion in Karlovy Vary on Saturday June 16th, 2001. The best Czech basketball player of the last century was announced to be Jiří Zídek Sr.

Results: Player (born) participation Olympic Games (OG), World Championship (WC), European Championship (EC) - medals, others

1 Jiří Zídek (1944) 2 WC, 6 EC - 1 silver medal, 1 bronze medal, 2 times Team of Europe
2 Kamil Brabenec (1951) 3 OG, 2 WC, 8 EC - 1 silver medal, 2 bronze medals, 1 times Team of Europe
3 Ivan Mrázek (1926) 2 OG, 4 EC - 3 silver medals, MVP and best scorer EC 1951 (17.1 ppg)

4 Jiří Zedníček (1945) 1 OG, 2 WC, 5 EC - 1 silver medal, 1 bronze medal, 5 times Team of Europe, MVP EC 1967
5-6 František Konvička (1938) 1 OG, 6 EC - 1 silver medal, 1 bronze medal, 2 times Team of Europe
5-6 Jan Bobrovský (1945) 2 WC, 6 EC - 1 silver medal, 1 bronze medal, 1 times Team of Europe

7 Jiří Baumruk (1930) 2 OG, 6 EC - 3 silver medals,1 bronze medal, MVP EC 1957
8 Jaroslav Šíp (1930) 1 OG, 5 EC - 3 silver medals, 1 bronze medal
9 Ladislav Trpkoš (1918) 2 OG, 2 EC - 1 gold medal, 1 silver medal
10 Miroslav Škeřík (1924) 1 OG, 5 EC - 3 silver medals, 1 bronze medal, best scorer EC 1955 (19.1 ppg)

11 Pospisil Jiri (1950), 3 OG, 1 WC, 5 EC - 1 bronze medal
12 Kos Zdenek (1951) 3 OG, 2 WC, 6 EC - 2 bronze medals
13 Ruzicka Jiri (1941) 1 WC, 5 EC - 1 silver medal, 1 bronze medal, 1 times Team of Europe
14 Bobrovsky Zdenek (1933) 2 OG, 4 EC - 3 silver medals, 1 bronze medal
15 Pistelak Vladimir (1940) 1 OG, 5 EC - 1 silver medal, 1 bronze medal, 2 times Team of Europe

16 Velensky Emil (1920) 2 EC - 1 gold medal, 1 silver medal
17 Zidek Jiri Jr. (1972) first Czech player in NBA (1995-98)
18 Kozak Jan (1929, 2 OG, 4 EC - 3 silver medals
19 Ezr Josef (1923, 1 OG, 2 EC - 1 gold medal, 1 silver medal
20 Havlik Vlastimil (1957, 1 OG, 1 WC, 2 EC -1 silver medal

21-22 Dousa Zdenek (1947, 3 OG, 2 WC, 3 EC -1 bronze medal
21-22 Rylich Zdenek (1930, 1 OG, 5 EC - 3 silver medals, 1 bronze medal
23 Tetiva Jaroslav (1932, 2 OG, 6 EC - 2 silver medals, 1 bronze medal
24 Hraska Gustav (1953, 2 OG, 3 WC, 4 EC - 1 bronze medal
25 Tomasek Bohumil (1936, 1 OG, 5 EC - 2 silver medals, 1 times Team of Europe
