= Imre Nagy (disambiguation) =

Imre Nagy (1896–1958) was a Hungarian communist politician.

Imre Nagy may also refer to:

- Imre Nagy (fencer) (1941–2011), Canadian fencer
- Imre Nagy (pentathlete) (1933–2013), Hungarian modern pentathlete
- Imre Nagy (painter) (1928-1997), Hungarian painter
