= James McDougall =

James, Jim or Jimmy McDougall or MacDougall may refer to:

- James McDougall (explorer), 19th century explorer of British Columbia
- James A. McDougall (1817–1867), American politician from California
- James Dunlop MacDougall (1891–1963), Scottish political activist
- Jimmy McDougall (footballer) (1904–1984), Scottish footballer (Partick Thistle, Liverpool FC and Scotland)
- James J. McDougall (born 1925), Canadian geologist, see Canadian Mining Hall of Fame
- Jim McDougal (1940–1998), political and business associate of Bill and Hillary Clinton
- Jimmy McDougall, Scottish Procurator Fiscal, responsible for investigating the crash of Pan Am Flight 103
- James MacDougall (born 1944), Canadian field hockey player
- James McDougall (academic) (born 1974), British historian and Oxford academic
- James McDougall (cricketer) (1890–1957), Scottis cricketer and British Army officer
