= Miloslav Kříž =

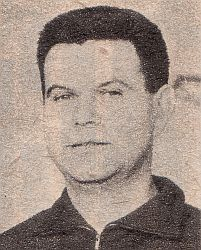
- Miloslav Kříž

Personal information
- Born: 29 May 1924 Czechoslovakia
- Died: 20 May 2013 (aged 88) Osnabrück, Germany

Career information
- Playing career: 1940–1948
- Coaching career: 1945–1971

Career history

Playing
- 1940–1943: Uncas Praha
- 1944–1948: Sparta Praha

Coaching
- 1945–1950: BLC Sparta Praha Women
- 1946–1948: Czechoslovak Women
- 1947–1950: Sparta Praha Women
- 1950–1951: ATK Praha
- 1953–1964: Sparta Praha Women
- 1960–1968: Czechoslovak Women
- 1968–1971: Germany
- 1968–1971: VfL Osnabrück

Career highlights
- As a head coach: 6× FIBA European Selection Team (1964, 1965 (2×), 1966–1968); German BBL champion (1969); 5× Czechoslovak Women's Championship champion (1948–1950, 1958, 1963); FIBA Order of Merit (2002)
Medals
Women's basketball
Head coach for Czechoslovakia
FIBA Women's World Cup
Bronze medal – third place	1967 Czechoslovakia
FIBA Women's EuroBasket
Silver medal – second place	1962 France
Silver medal – second place	1966 Romania
Bronze medal – third place	1964 Hungary

Miloslav Kříž (29 May 1924 – 20 May 2013) was a Czech professional basketball player, coach and executive. As a player, he played first for Uncas Praha, and later for Sparta Praha, but he was better known as a head coach and trainer, especially as the head coach of the senior Czechoslovak women's national team. He was awarded the FIBA Order of Merit, for his services to basketball, in 2002.

== Playing career ==
Kříž played for Uncas Praha, from 1940 to 1943, leaving to join Sparta Praha, in 1944, where he remained until 1948.

== Coaching career ==
While still a player at Sparta Praha, Kříž began coaching both the club's women's team (from 1945), and men's team (from 1947). He finished in both of those roles in 1950, moving on to coach ATK Praha, for one season. In 1953, he returned to Sparta Praha, coaching the women's team for 11 years.

During the same period, Kříž was also the head coach of the senior Czechoslovak Women's National Team, from 1946 to 1948, and again, from 1960 to 1968. The team finished third in the 1967 FIBA World Championship for Women. They were also runners-up in the EuroBasket Women 1962 and the EuroBasket Women 1966, and finished third at the EuroBasket Women 1964.

Kříž then moved to Germany, where from 1968 to 1971, he was the head coach of the senior German Men's National Team, and also of VfL Osnabrück, who were the men's club champions of Germany in 1969, as they won that year's championship of Germany's top-tier level basketball competition, the Bundesliga. He also coached the FIBA European Selection teams, between 1964 and 1968.

== Basketball administration ==
=== Czechoslovakia ===
Kříž was also active in a variety of basketball organisations. Within Czechoslovakia, he was a member of the board of the Czechoslovak Volleyball and Basketball Federation (1946–51), President of DSO Spartak (1953–56), and leader of the Czechoslovak Basketball Federation's International Commission (1956–68). From 1973 until 1986, he was President of the Czech Basketball Federation, and Vice-President of the Czechoslovak Basketball Federation. From 1990 until 1993, he was the President of Sparta Prague, and made Honorary President thereafter.

=== FIBA ===
Internationally, Kříž held a number of positions within FIBA. He was a member of staff for the FIBA Europe European zone, from 1956–68, and again from 1973–80, as well as a member of the FIBA European Cups commission, from 1972–76 and from 1990–94. From 1980–90, he was a member of FIBA World, and President of the Women's Commission, and from 1994 until 2000, he was FIBA Commissioner, presiding over 678 games in total.

== Later career ==
Between 1970 and 1985, Kříž was the chief of the sports section at the Czechoslovak Press Agency. In his later career, he practiced law.

== See also ==
- FIBA All-Star Games
- Czechoslovak Women's Basketball Championship
- FIBA EuroBasket Women
- BLC Sparta Prague
