= Miroslav Škeřík =

Czech basketball player (1924–2013)

Personal information
- Born: 14 October 1924 Košice, Czechoslovakia
- Died: 11 January 2013 (aged 88) Prague, Czech Republic
- Listed height: 6 ft 5.75 in (1.97 m)

Career information
- Playing career: 1950–1961
- Position: Center

Career history
- 1950–1951: Dukla Praha
- 1951–1953: Sparta Praha
- 1953–1956: Dukla Praha
- 1956–1961: Slovan Orbis

Career highlights
- FIBA EuroBasket Top Scorer (1955); 5× Czechoslovak League champion (1954, 1955, 1956, 1957, 1959); Czechoslovak 20th Century Team (2001)
Medals
Representing Czechoslovakia
Men's basketball
EuroBasket
Silver medal – second place	1951 France
Silver medal – second place	1955 Hungary
Silver medal – second place	1959 Turkey
Bronze medal – third place	1957 Bulgaria

Miroslav Škeřík (14 October 1924 – 11 January 2013) was a Czech professional basketball player. At 6'5 3/4" (1.97 m) tall, he played the center position. He was the top scorer of EuroBasket 1955, averaging 19.1 points per game.

== Club playing career ==
In his club career, Škeřík won 5 Czechoslovak League championships (1954, 1955, 1956, 1957, 1959).

== National team career ==
Škeřík helped lead the senior Czechoslovakia national team to three EuroBasket silver medals in 1951, 1955, and 1959, as well as to a EuroBasket bronze medal in EuroBasket 1957. He was the Top scorer of EuroBasket 1955. He also represented Czechoslovakia in the Summer Olympic Games of 1952.
