= Josef Fleischlinger =

Personal information
- Born: 12 December 1911
- Died: 4 April 2013 (aged 101)

Josef Fleischlinger (12 December 1911 – 4 April 2013) was a Czechoslovak basketball coach and referee, an ice hockey referee, and a sports official.

== Biography ==
At first a basketball player in Brno, Fleischlinger later became a coach and led the Sokol Brno I. team to give title victories in the Czechoslovak Basketball League between 1945 and 1951. He was an assistant coach of the Czechoslovak basketball team at the 1946 European Championship in Geneva, where the team won a gold medal. As a coach, he twice led the national team at the Olympics (1948 in London — 7th place; 1952 in Helsinki — 10th place) and twice earned a silver medal at EuroBasket (1947 in Prague, 1955 in Budapest). From 1946, he was a FIBA referee, later a commissioner at FIBA tournaments. He relinquished his coaching career in 1955 in order to devote himself to his duties as the FIBA official. In the Czechoslovak Basketball Federation, Fleischlinger headed the referee section and was a member of the Federation's committee.

As an ice hockey referee, Josef Fleischlinger took part at four games at the 1948 Winter Olympics in St. Moritz. Among others, he worked the Canada - Sweden match (3-1) on January 30, 1948. Fleischlinger was inducted into the City of Brno Sports Hall of Fame in 2011.

== Coach ==
- 1945-1951 Sokol Brno I., 5x League Champion
- 1946-1955 Czechoslovakia national basketball team
- Achievements:
  - Summer Olympic Games (coach): 1948 London (7th place) and 1952 Helsinky (10th place)
  - EuroBasket (assistant coach): 1946 Geneva (European Champion)
  - EuroBasket (coach) 2x runner-up: 1947 Prague (2nd place) and 1955 Budapest (2nd place)

== International referee ==
- 1946 FIBA, international basketball referee, FIBA official for international games
- 1948 Winter Olympic Games 1948, 4 games of the Olympic ice hockey tournament

== Sports official ==
- From 1969 committee member of the basketball section of the Czechoslovak Sports Association, head of the referee commission

== Published works ==
- Josef Fleischlinger, Zdeněk Procházka : Pravidla košíkové, 1. vydání, Praha : Olympia, 1977, 69s
