= Ján Kozák =

Ján Kozák may refer to:

- Ján Kozák (footballer born 1954)
- Ján Kozák (footballer born 1980)
- Jan Kozák (basketball player, 1929 – 2016)
