= Krepela =

Krepela or Křepela is a surname. Notable people with the surname include:

- Josef Křepela (1924–1974), Slovak basketball player
- Kristina Krepela (born 1979), Croatian actress
- Neil Krepela (born 1947), American special effects artist and cinematographer
