= Kořínek =

Kořínek (Czech feminine: Kořínková) is a Czech surname meaning "small root". Notable people include:

- Aleš Kořínek (born 1983), Czech footballer
- Ivana Kořínková (born 1950), Czech basketball player
- Karl Korinek (1940–2017), Austrian scholar
- Květoslava Kořínková (1940–2026), Czech politician
- Radim Kořínek (born 1973), Czech cyclist
- Valerie Korinek (born 1965), Canadian historian
