= Jutta Pallos-Schönauer =

- Born: January 12, 1925; Reghin, Romania
- Died: December 4, 2020 (aged 95); Stuttgart, Germany
- Citizenship: Romanian
- Known for: Artist
- Children: 1

Jutta Pallos-Schönauer (January 12, 1925 – December 4, 2020) was a German-Romanian painter and graphic artist.

== Biography ==
Pallos-Schönauer studied from 1948 to 1954 at the Academy of Visual Arts "Ioan Andreescu" in Cluj-Napoca under Gabor Miklossy and Imre Nagy. After graduating with distinction, she worked as a lecturer at the Folk Art College of Cluj-Napoca from 1954 to 1956. She then worked as a freelance painter and graphic artist. Jutta Pallos-Schönauer also worked as a book illustrator in Romania.

=== Later life ===
In 1986 she moved to West Germany and initially lived in Karlsruhe. After the death of her husband, she moved to Stuttgart, where her daughter lives.

== Artistic style and legacy ==
Pallos-Schönauer used a variety of painting techniques in her painting work, which include watercolours, graphic black-and-white techniques, coloured pastel works and oil painting on canvas.

In her works, she reflects on people, landscapes, the architecture and culture of her Transylvanian homeland, reflecting the legacy of a lost cultural landscape. The motifs that appear in her work include an artistic examination of almost all important events in Romanian history and their impact on the culture of the German minority in Romania. From these historical experiences grows a deep connection to her homeland, traditions, and customs, which are expressed through the works of Pallos-Schönauer in expression, color and rhythm. Pallos-Schönauer's work focuses on themes of vulnerability, displacement, and the loss of home and identity, for which there is a sense of hope and solace in her works. Her works range from figurative compositions to architectural paintings. Of particular importance for her artistic work are her drawings and pictures of the cityscapes of Cluj-Napoca, Sighisoara and Sibiu, in which she embarks on a nostalgic search for her homeland in the depiction of old buildings, churches, fortified churches and idyllic alleys. Her pictures, however, are not uncritical reflections, but always pose the "quiet and drilling" question of identity and origin. Jutta Pallos-Schönauer's paintings, viewed as a whole, remain attached to the traditional, realistic style. In them, however, Jutta Pallos-Schönauer created a sustainable synthesis of the subject and technique, without resorting to possible elements of Cubism or Expressionism in terms of composition.

The works of Jutta Pallos-Schönauer have been shown in numerous solo and group exhibitions in Romania, Austria, Hungary, Sweden, Italy, Canada and the USA, among other countries.

In Germany, regional and national retrospective exhibitions of her works took place in Karlsruhe in 1990, in Düsseldorf and Esslingen am Neckar in 2005, and in Stuttgart in 2008, 2015 and 2020.

== Bibliography ==
- Octavian Barbosa: Dictionarul artistilor romani contemporani. Meridiane Verlag. București. 1976
- György Seregélyi: Magyar festők és grafikusok adattára. Életrajzi lexikon az 1800–1988 között alkotó festő – és grafikusművészekről. Szeged 1988.
- W. Myss: Art in Transylvania. Thaur near Innsbruck 1991.
