= Vladimír Heger =

Czechoslovak basketball player (1932–2021)

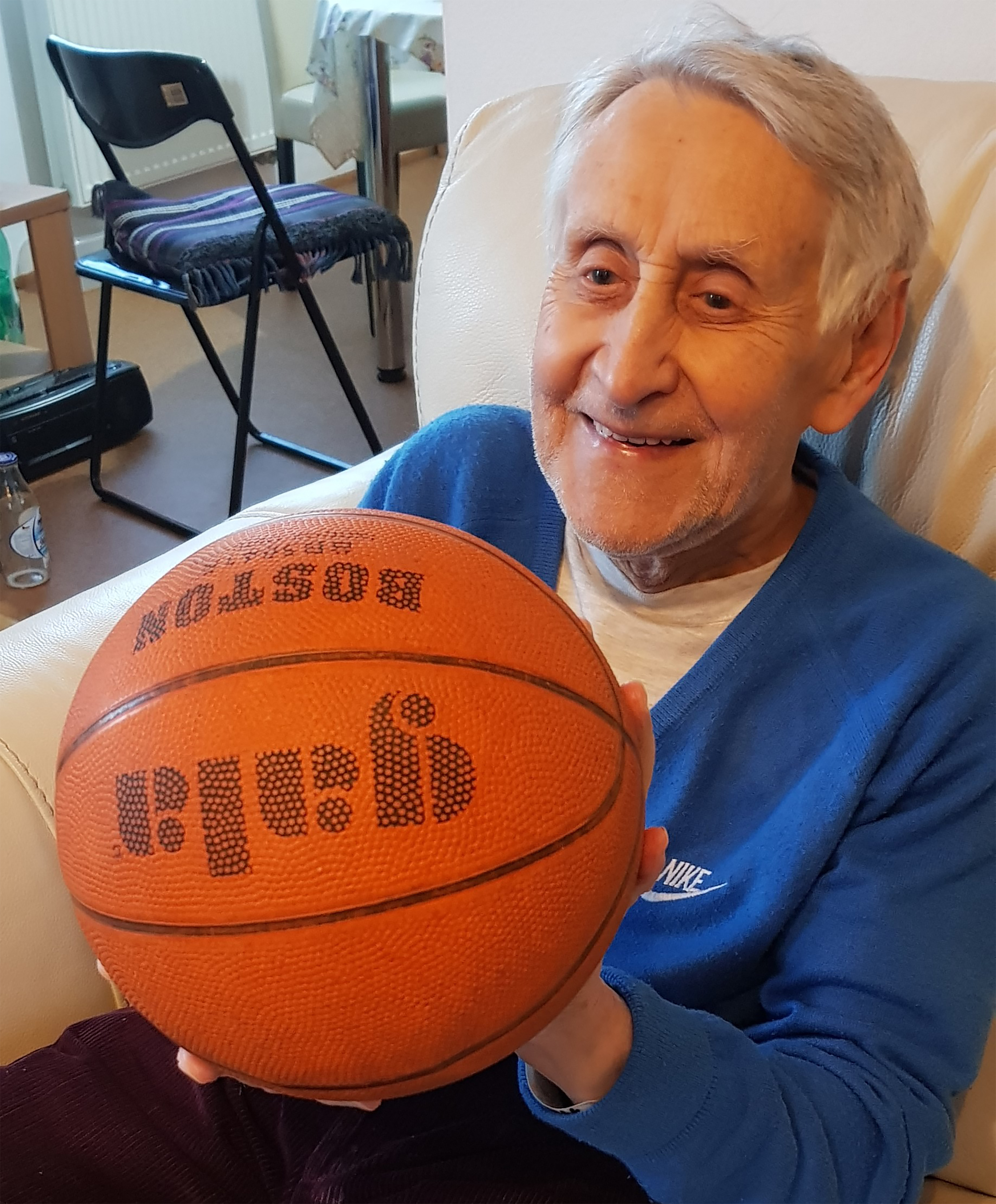
- Heger in 2018

Personal information
- Born: 30 January 1932 Prague, Czechoslovakia
- Died: 1 March 2021 (aged 89)

Career information
- Playing career: 1951–1955
- Coaching career: 1975–1985

Career history

Playing
- 1951: Slavia Praha
- 1952–1954: ATK / ÚDA Praha
- 1954–1955: Slavia Praha

Coaching
- 1975–1970: Sparta Praha
- 1965–1969: Czechoslovakia
- 1972–1976: Czechoslovakia
- 1983–1985: Netherlands
- 1984–1985: Den Bosch
- 1987: ICL Zaandam
- 1988–1989: Akrides

Career highlights
- As player: Czechoslovak League champion (1954)

Vladimír Heger (30 January 1932 – 1 March 2021) was a Czechoslovak basketball player and coach. He was most known for his achievement as head coach of the Czechoslovak and Dutch national team.

== Coaching career ==
In 1965, Heger took over as head coach of the Czechoslovakia national basketball team. He won silver at EuroBasket 1967 and bronze at EuroBasket 1969. In 1983, he started as head coach of the Netherlands national basketball team. Heger led the team to the fourth place at EuroBasket 1983, the best ranking of the Netherlands of all-time. From 1984, he coached several clubs from the Eredivisie including Den Bosch, Zaandam and Akrides.
