= Hayashida =

Hayashida (written: 林田 lit. "woods ricefield") is a Japanese surname. Notable people with the surname include:

- Fumiko Hayashida (1911–2014), American activist
- Kazuyo Hayashida (林田 和代, born 1953), Japanese women's basketball player
- Q Hayashida (林田 球, born 1977), Japanese manga artist
- Takeshi Hayashida (林田 彪, born 1959), Japanese politician
- Yukio Hayashida (林田 悠紀夫, 1915–2007), Japanese politician
