= Carol Bishop =

Carol Bishop may refer to:

- Carol Bishop-Gwyn, Canadian writer
- Carole Bishop, Canadian volleyball player
- Kelly Bishop (Carole Bishop, born 1944), American actress and dancer
