= Fleurette =

Fleurette may refer to:

- a small flower, in the French language
- Fleurette (opera), an opera by American composer and conductor Emma Roberto Steiner (1856–1929)
- an 1864 opera by Alsatian composer Viktor Nessler (1841–1890)
- Fleurette Beauchamp-Huppé (1907–2007), Canadian pianist, teacher and soprano
- Fleurette Campeau (born 1941), a Canadian fencer
- a type of Crème fraiche
