= Vondrka =

Vondrka (feminine Vondrková) is a Czech surname. Notable people with the surname include:

- Josef Vondrka (born 1952), Czech volleyball player
- Michal Vondrka (born 1982), Czech ice hockey player
- Šárka Vondrková (born 1976), Czech ice dancer
