= Bohumil Tomášek =

Czech basketball player and coach (1936–2019)

Personal information
- Born: 21 June 1936 Liberec, Czechoslovakia
- Died: 2 November 2019 (aged 83)
- Listed height: 6 ft 6.5 in (1.99 m)
- Listed weight: 212 lb (96 kg)

Career information
- Playing career: 1956–1972
- Coaching career: 1970–1988

Career history

Playing
- 1956–1960: Sparta Praha
- 1960–1961: Dukla Mariánské Lázně
- 1961–1966: Sparta Praha
- 1966–1969: Slavia VŠ Praha
- 1969–1972: SSV Hagen

Coaching
- 1970–1972: SSV Hagen (player-coach)
- 1978–1988: Slavia VŠ Praha (youth)

Career highlights
- As player: FIBA European Selection Team (1967); FIBA Saporta Cup champion (1969); 2× Czechoslovak League champion (1960, 1969); German BBL Top Scorer (1971); Czechoslovak 20th Century Team (2001)
Medals
Representing Czechoslovakia
Men's basketball
EuroBasket
Silver medal – second place	1959 Turkey
Silver medal – second place	1967 Finland

Bohumil Tomášek (21 June 1936 – 2 November 2019) was a Czech basketball player and coach. He was voted to the Czechoslovak 20th Century Team in 2001.

== Playing career ==
=== Club career ===
Tomášek won two Czechoslovak League championships, in the years 1960 and 1969. He also won the European-wide secondary level FIBA Saporta Cup championship, in the 1968–69 season. He was named to the FIBA European Selection Team in 1967. He was also the German League's top scorer, in the 1970–71 season.

=== National team career ===
With the senior Czechoslovak national team, Tomášek competed in the men's tournament at the 1960 Summer Olympics. With Czechoslovakia, he also won the silver medal at the 1959 EuroBasket, and the silver medal at the 1967 EuroBasket.

== Coaching career ==
Tomášek was a player-coach with the German League club SSV Hagen, from 1970 to 1972.
