= BC Sparta Praha =

Sparta Praha
- League: NBL, Czech 1 League
- Founded: 1939
- Dissolved: 2006; 20 years ago
- History: 1939 AC Sparta Praha; 1950 Spartak Praha Sokolovo; 1965 Sparta CKD Praha; 1990 BC Sparta Praha
- Arena: Hala Sparta Praha
- Capacity: 2,700
- Location: Prague, Czech Republic
- Team colors
- Head coach: Jaromír Geršl
- Championships: Czechoslovak League (2): 1940, 1960 vice-champion (10): 1949, 1950, 1951, 1952, 1956, 1959, 1961, 1989, 1990, 1991; Czech League vice-champion (1): 1993; Czech Cup vice-champion (1): 1995

Sparta Praha was among the oldest and most popular sports clubs in the country, with a number of fans not only in Prague but throughout the whole of the Czech Republic. The foundation of the club dates back to 1893 (AC Sparta Prague). Club colours are red, yellow, and blue.

== History ==
Basketball Club Sparta Praha (short: BC Sparta Praha) was a Czech men's basketball club from Prague founded in 1939 as a section of omnisport club Sparta Prague. Since that time it has been a long-term member of the basketball elite. This is confirmed by its results both in the First League and the participation of its players in the national team.

During the course of its history, BC Sparta Praha has been headed by as few as four representatives. The first chairman was Václav Jeřábek (1939–52), the second Josef Ezr (1952–90, a full 38 years!), the third Miloslav Kříž (1990–93) and the fourth Pavel Majerik (1993–2005). Amongst important functionaries and coaches in the history of the club are for example Josef Klima, Lubomir Bednar, Hana Ezrova, Cyril Mandel, Vladimir Heger, Zdenek Miskovsky, Lubos Dobry, Zbynek Kubin and Michal Jezdik.

=== Coaches ===
- 1939–1942 : Václav Jeřábek
- 1942–1944 : Josef Klíma
- 1946–1948 : Jaroslav First
- 1948–1950 : Miloslav Kříž
- 1950–1951, 1955–1958: Lubomír Bednář
- 1952–1956, 1958–1964 : Josef Ezr
- 1964–1965 : Vladimír Lodr
- 1965–1970, 1996–1997 : Vladimír Heger
- 1970–1971 : Ladislav Šenkýř
- 1971–1979 : Jiří Baumruk
- 1979–1985 : Vladimír Mandel
- 1985–1990 : Lubor Blažek
- 1990–1992 : Jiří Růžička
- 1992–1993 : Jiří Zídek
- 1993–1994 : Pavel Majerík
- 1994–1996, 1997–2003 : Michal Ježdík
- 2003–2006 : Jaromír Geršl

== Competitions and Honours ==
The basketball players of Sparta Praha played their first match against the Prague Sokol team on 23 December 1939 and won 42–35, similarly as in the second match on 20 January 1940 when they beat YMCA Prague 44–19. In the season 1939/40 the Sparta Prague basketball players won their First League championship trophy with the team: Bartonicek, Bartu, Ctyroky, Dolezal, A.Dvoracek, L. Dvoracek, Faloun, Hlousek, Hruda, Jencek, Klima, Labohy, Prokop, Trpkos, with coach Jerabek. In the season 1959/60 Sparta won their second league championship trophy with the team: Jiří Baumruk, Kinsky, Krasny, Lodr, Prazak, Rojko, Tomasek, Czesany, Kliner, Pietsch, Rotter and coach Josef Ezr.

Also to be counted amongst Sparta's successes are 10 seasons in which Sparta was runner-up in the First League and 10 seasons in which Sparta finished third in the First League, as well as second place in the Czech Cup in 1995 and third place in the same tournament in 1996. The Sparta team is in second place in the historical table of the First League, behind Zbrojovka Brno and ahead of Slavia VŠ Praha. In the history of Sparta there are two particularly successful periods: 1959–64 (once champions, twice runners-up, twice third place) and 1989–94 (4 times runners-up and once third place).

== European competitions ==
=== FIBA Champions' Cup (1) ===
- 1961, lost in the Quarter-Finale Steaua București, Romania (60-50 & 47–65)

=== FIBA Cup Winners' Cup (1) ===
- 1991/92: lost in the 2nd round Panionios, Greece (87-81 & 84–103)

=== FIBA Korać Cup (12) ===
CSA Sparta Praha

- 1989/90 lost Bellinzona, Switzerland (88–83, 73–80)
- 1990/91 lost Panathinaikos, Greece (64–72, 75–72)
- 1992/93 lost AEK, Greece (82–91, 80–95)
- 1993/94 defeated Lugano Tigers, Switzerland (101–66, 98–71), then lost Fenerbahçe, Turkey (96–87, 56–95)
- 1994/95 lost Okapi Aalst, Belgium (75–91, 68–60)
- 1995/96 lost Dijon, France (51–78, 69–71)
- 1996/97 defeated Polonia Przemyśl, Poland (72–64, 68–70), then results in Group: Paris-Levallois, France (59–72, 45–82), Benston, Croatia (63–90, 41–60) and Maccabi Rishon LeZion, Israel (69–94, 80–84)
- 1997/98 defeated Polonia Przemyśl, Poland (63–60, 75–67), then results in Group: Echo Houthalen, Belgium (78–76, 62–70), TAU Cerámica, Spain (49–89, 52–91) and Nancy, France (77–85, 56–103)
- 1998/99 defeated Achilleas, Cyprus (54–71, 97–65), then results in Group: Apollon Patras, Greece (62–85, 64–72), Maccabi Ra'anana, Israel (66–81, 50–80) and Brotnjo, Bosnia and Herzegovina (67–85, 43–55)
- 1999/00: defeated Arkadia Traiskirchen, Austria (63–70, 78–67) then results in Group: Zagreb, Croatia (62–82, 51–62), Maccabi Ramat Gan, Israel (68–71, 71–99) and Maroussi, Greece (63–103, 82–85)
- 2000/01 lost DJK Würzburg, Germany (51–90, 59–71)
- 2001/02 lost Pivovarna Laško, Slovenia (86–111, 65–102).

== Notable players ==
- (Czech Republic) Josef Ezr (31 October 1923 – 2 November 2013) Sparta Prague player (1948–1959), coach (1952–1964), president (1952–1990)
- (Czech Republic) Jiří Baumruk (27 June 1930 – 23 November 1989) Sparta Prague player (1949–1964), coach (1971–1979)
- (Czech Republic) Bohumil Tomášek (born 21 June 1936) Sparta Prague player (1949–1964)
- (Czech Republic) Zdeněk Douša (born 5 March 1947) Sparta Prague player (1966–1987)
- (Czech Republic) Vladimír Vyoral (born 5 December 1961) Sparta Prague player (1980–1991, 1996–2002), coach (2004)
- (Czech Republic) Michal Ježdík (born 4 August 1963) Sparta Prague player (1981–1998), coach (1994–2003)
- (Czech Republic) Jiří Zídek Jr. (born 2 August 1973) Sparta Prague Player (1989–1991), NBA (1995–1998)
- (Czech Republic) Ondřej Starosta (born 28 May 1979) Sparta Prague player (1998–2000)
- (Czech Republic) Pavel Miloš (born 26 July 1979) Sparta Prague player (1996–2005), NBA Draft 2001 candidate
- (Czech Republic) Jiří Welsch (born 27 January 1980) Sparta Prague player (1998–2000), NBA (2002–2006)
- Sacha Killeya-Jones (born 1998), American-British basketball player for Hapoel Gilboa Galil of the Israeli Basketball Premier League

== See also ==
- Czechoslovakia national basketball team
- Czech Republic national basketball team
- Basketball in the Czech Republic
- BLC Sparta Praha
