= BK Uncas Praha =

- Leagues: CSBL
- Founded: 1924
- History: YMCA Praha (1924–37); Uncas Praha (1937–51)
- Location: Prague, Czechoslovakia
- Team colors: Red, white and blue
- Championships: 12 Czechoslovak Leagues
Home	Away

BK Uncas Praha (Czech: Basketbalový klub Uncas Praha) was a Czech basketball club from Prague. The club was founded by YMCA Prague.

== History ==
In 1924 the club was at the origin of the Czech volleyball and basketball association. Six years later, the first championship guild that was just YMCA. Thanks to the initiative of the director of the Prague YMCA FM Mark was June 18, 1932 in Geneva based International Federation of Basketball (FIBA). In 1934, YMCA hosted the first nationwide championship, which won again. Players of YMCA Prague were the basis for representation of Czechoslovakia at the FIBA EuroBasket 1935 (3rd place) and at the 1936 Summer Olympics in Berlin (9th place).

After the ninth triumph in a row in 1938 came to a steep fall from grace. The club ceased to exist in 1951 when the communist regime was forced to close down. Record number of titles in the Czechoslovak league was broken up in 1967, when Spartak ZJŠ Brno won its eleventh title in history.

The basketball team of Uncas Praha was one of the men's YMCA teams. In 1937 after the team of YMCA took over the position of the best Czechoslovak team won 6 medals (4x Champion, 2x Vice Republic) and his players were the basis for the national team of Czechoslovakia at the FIBA EuroBasket 1937 (Riga, Latvia). In 1940, six players (Ladislav Trpkoš, Josef Klima, Josef Bartoníček, Silverius Labohý, Ladislav Prokop and Faloun) crossed into Sparta Prague, with whom he became champion of the Republic. Runner-up became the new young team own pups Uncas (Miloslav Cross, Frank Chytil, M. Škoch, Ctirad Benáček, Chlumský, Simek, Vidlák). The other two titles and one second place for Uncas's team, which is based players were Ladislav Trpkoš, Emil Velenský, George Drvota, Karel Bělohradský, Václav Beauty, Petráň Machine, who won the season 1946-47 Bohemian championship and finished second in the Championship for Czechoslovakia after Sokol Brno I, third and fourth place went to university of Bratislava and SK Bratislava.

== Honours ==
Czechoslovak League

- Winners (12): 1929-39, 1931, 1932, 1932–33, 1933–34, 1934–35, 1935–36, 1936–37, 1937–38, 1943–44, 1944–45, 1946-47
