= SK Královo Pole Brno (basketball) =

The basketball of Sportovní klub Královo Pole Brno won the top league in total once and include it in the record of the Czechoslovak league overall 15th place.

== Honours ==
Czechoslovak League

- Winners (1): 1938-39
