= Jaroslav Šíp =

Czech basketball player

Personal information
- Born: 24 November 1930
- Died: 6 November 2014 (aged 83)
- Listed height: 5 ft 11 in (1.80 m)

Career information
- Playing career: 1950–1964
- Position: Point guard
- Coaching career: 1964–1985

Career history

Playing
- 1950–1951: Sokol Žižkov
- 1951–1953: Slavia VŠ Praha
- 1953–1956: ÚDA Praha
- 1956–1964: Slovan Orbis Praha

Coaching
- 1964–1966: Slavia VŠ Praha
- 1966–1968: Virtus Bologna
- 1969–1985: Slavia VŠ Praha

Career highlights
- As player: 5× Czechoslovak League champion (1954–1957, 1959); Czechoslovak 20th Century Team (2001); As head coach: FIBA Saporta Cup champion (1969); 7× Czechoslovak League champion (1965, 1966, 1970, 1971, 1974, 1981, 1982)

Jaroslav Šíp (24 November 1930 – 6 November 2014) was a Czech basketball player and coach. He was voted to the Czechoslovak 20th Century Team in 2001.

== Playing career ==
=== Club career ===
During his club playing career, Šíp won five Czechoslovak League championships (1954, 1955, 1956, 1957, and 1959).

=== National team career ===
Šíp competed with the senior Czechoslovakia national team at the men's tournament at the 1952 Summer Olympics. He also competed with Czechoslovakia at the 1951 EuroBasket, where he won a silver medal, at the 1955 EuroBasket, where he won a silver medal, at the 1957 EuroBasket, where he won a bronze medal, and at the 1959 EuroBasket, where he won a silver medal.

== Coaching career ==
During his coaching career, Šíp won seven Czechoslovak League championships (1965, 1966, 1970, 1971, 1974, 1981, and 1982). He also won the European-wide secondary level FIBA Saporta Cup championship, in the 1968–69 season.
