= Marian Kotleba (basketball) =

Slovak basketball player (1952–2025)

Personal information
- Born: 2 January 1952 Bratislava, Czechoslovakia
- Died: 10 December 2025 (aged 73)

Career information
- Playing career: 1971–1990

Career history
- 1971–1973: Inter Bratislava
- 1973–1974: Dukla Olomouc
- 1975–1981: Inter Bratislava
- 1981–1983: BC Prievidza
- 1983–1985: Matador Bratislava
- 1985–1987: TG Hanau
- 1987–1990: Matador Bratislava

Career highlights
- Slovak Basketball Player of the Year (1972); Champion of the Czechoslovak Basketball League (1979, 1980)

Marian Kotleba (2 January 1952 – 10 December 2025) was a Slovak basketball player. He played for Inter Bratislava, Dukla Olomouc, and BC Prievidza, and was selected for the Czechoslovakia national team for 96 games.

Kotleba died on 10 December 2025, at the age of 73.
