= BC Moravian Slavia Brno =

BC Moravian Slavia Brno (Czech: BK Moravská Slavia Brno) was a Czech basketball club that played in the Czechoslovak Basketball League (CSBL) from the mid-1940s until the early 1990s, but in 2010 went bankrupt. The club originally belonged under the umbrella of SK Slavia Moravian Brno, but in 1993 split off from its parent organization and became independent. BC Brno played at Morenda Hall.

== History ==
- ?-1993 SK Moravská Slavia Brno (oddíl košíkové / basketball section)
- 1993-2010 BK Moravská Slavia Brno

== Honours ==
Czechoslovak League

- Winners (2): 1952, 1953
