= Lucie Balthazar =

Canadian handball player (born 1958)

Lucie Balthazar (born January 15, 1958, in Saint-Hyacinthe, Quebec) is a Canadian former handball player who competed in the 1976 Summer Olympics.

She was part of the Canadian handball team, which finished sixth in the Olympic tournament. She played all five matches and scored one goal.
