= Slobodan Misic-Brenda =

- Occupations: Handball Coach, Author

Slobodan Misic-Brenda (born November 8, 1942) is a Canadian handball coach and author on the sport.

== Career ==
Misic was head coach of the Quebec handball team for the 1976 Olympics held in Montreal. In 1981, he also co-authored a training manual for handball goal keepers.

== Background ==
Misic was born in Brusnik, Serbia, soon after World War 2 started. His father died during the war and the family moved to Negotin. Misic began to play handball in high school. He continued to play in Belgrade where he studied International Commerce at the University of Belgrade Faculty of Economics. After graduation, he moved to Morocco joining an uncle who worked there as an expert for a partnership targeting non aligned countries. Misic introduced the sport of handball to the Moroccans and trained several teams in Casablanca and Rabat. After the 1965 Casablanca riots, Misic and his uncle immigrated to Montreal, Canada.

Misic's aunt is Canadian writer Miodrag Kojadinović's maternal grandmother.
