= Anne Ireland (volleyball) =

Canadian volleyball player (born 1946)

Personal information
- Born: 8 May 1946 (age 79) Holland, Manitoba, Canada

Sport
- Sport: Volleyball

Anne Ireland (born 8 May 1946) is a Canadian volleyball player. She competed in the women's tournament at the 1976 Summer Olympics.
