= Claude Lefebvre (handballer) =

Canadian handball player (born 1952)

Claude Lefebvre (born December 8, 1952, in Montreal, Quebec) is a former Canadian handball player who competed in the 1976 Summer Olympics.

He was part of the Canadian handball team which finished eleventh in the 1976 Olympic tournament. He played all five matches.
