= Claire Lloyd =

Canadian volleyball player (born 1952)

Personal information
- Born: 20 July 1952 (age 73) Winnipeg, Manitoba, Canada

Sport
- Sport: Volleyball

Claire Lloyd (born 20 July 1952) is a Canadian volleyball player. The 5 ft 9in tall Lloyd competed in the women's tournament at the 1976 Summer Olympics.
