= Debbie Heeps =

Canadian volleyball Hall of Famer

Deborah
Personal information
- Full name: Deborah Carol Heeps
- Nationality: Canadian
- Born: 18 December 1955 (age 70) Vancouver, British Columbia, Canada

Sport
- Sport: Volleyball

Debra (Debbie) Carol Heeps (born 18 December 1955) is a Canadian volleyball player. She competed in the women's tournament at the 1976 Summer Olympics in Montreal, Canada. Debbie had 36 year career at the City of Vancouver and now spends her time golfing, doing yoga and executing 'pancake Saturday' for Evie Madai. Debbie is a pioneer for LGBTQ rights and shares daughter Ellie Heeps and son Liam Heeps with her former partner Jayne Hunter.
