= Michal Nekola =

Czech volleyball player and coach

Michal Nekola (born 12 July 1970) is a Czech volleyball player and coach. Between 2017 and 2020, he was the main coach of the Czech national team, which he coached at the 2017 and 2019 Men's European Volleyball Championships.
