= Pták =

Pták (feminine: Ptáková) is a Czech surname meaning "bird". Notable people with the surname include:

- Jiří Pták (born 1946), Czech Olympic rower
- Vlastimil Pták (1925–1999), Czech mathematician
