= Jim Ducharme =

Canadian water polo player (born 1953)

Personal information
- Born: 5 December 1953 (age 71); Quebec City, Quebec, Canada

Sport
- Sport: Water polo

Jim Ducharme (born 5 December 1953) is a Canadian water polo player. He competed in the men's tournament at the 1976 Summer Olympics.
