= Danny Power =

Canadian handball player (born 1956)

Danny Power (born March 25, 1956, in Saint-Jean-sur-Richelieu, Quebec) is a former Canadian handball player who competed in the 1976 Summer Olympics.

He was part of the Canadian handball team which finished eleventh in the 1976 Olympic tournament. He played all five matches. He also played at the Copa Latina in Argentina in 1975 and in France in 1976. He was part of the first handball Canadian team to play at the world championship in Denmark in 1978. In the Pan-American handball game held in 1980 in Mexico, he played all the games and the Canadian team won the silver medal. He was named MVP 3 times at the Canadian championship. In 2000, he was introduce in the handball hall of fame and voted the goalkeeper of the century.
