= Misako Satake =

Japanese basketball player (born 1951)

Personal information
- Nationality: Japanese
- Born: 19 January 1951 (age 74) Miyazaki, Japan

Sport
- Sport: Basketball

Misako Satake (佐竹 美佐子, Satake Misako; born 19 January 1951) is a Japanese basketball player. She competed in the women's tournament at the 1976 Summer Olympics.
