= Ibrahim Fakhr El-Din =

Egyptian volleyball player (born 1954)

Personal information
- Nationality: Egyptian
- Born: 1 February 1954 (age 71)

Sport
- Sport: Volleyball

Ibrahim Fakhr El-Din (born 1 February 1954) is an Egyptian volleyball player. He competed in the men's tournament at the 1976 Summer Olympics.
