= Louise Hurtubise =

Canadian handball player (born 1953)

Louise Hurtubise (born October 11, 1953) is a former Canadian handball player who competed in the 1976 Summer Olympics.

Born in Montreal, Quebec, Hurtubise was part of the Canadian handball team, which finished sixth in the Olympic tournament. She played four matches and scored two goals.
