= Jindřich Kinský =

Czech basketball player

Personal information
- Nationality: Czech
- Born: 27 June 1927; Prague, Czechoslovakia
- Died: 8 April 2008 (aged 80)

Sport
- Sport: Basketball

Jindřich Kinský (27 June 1927 – 8 April 2008) was a Czech basketball player. He competed in the men's tournament at the 1960 Summer Olympics.
