= Jiří Baumruk =

Czech basketball player (1930–1989)

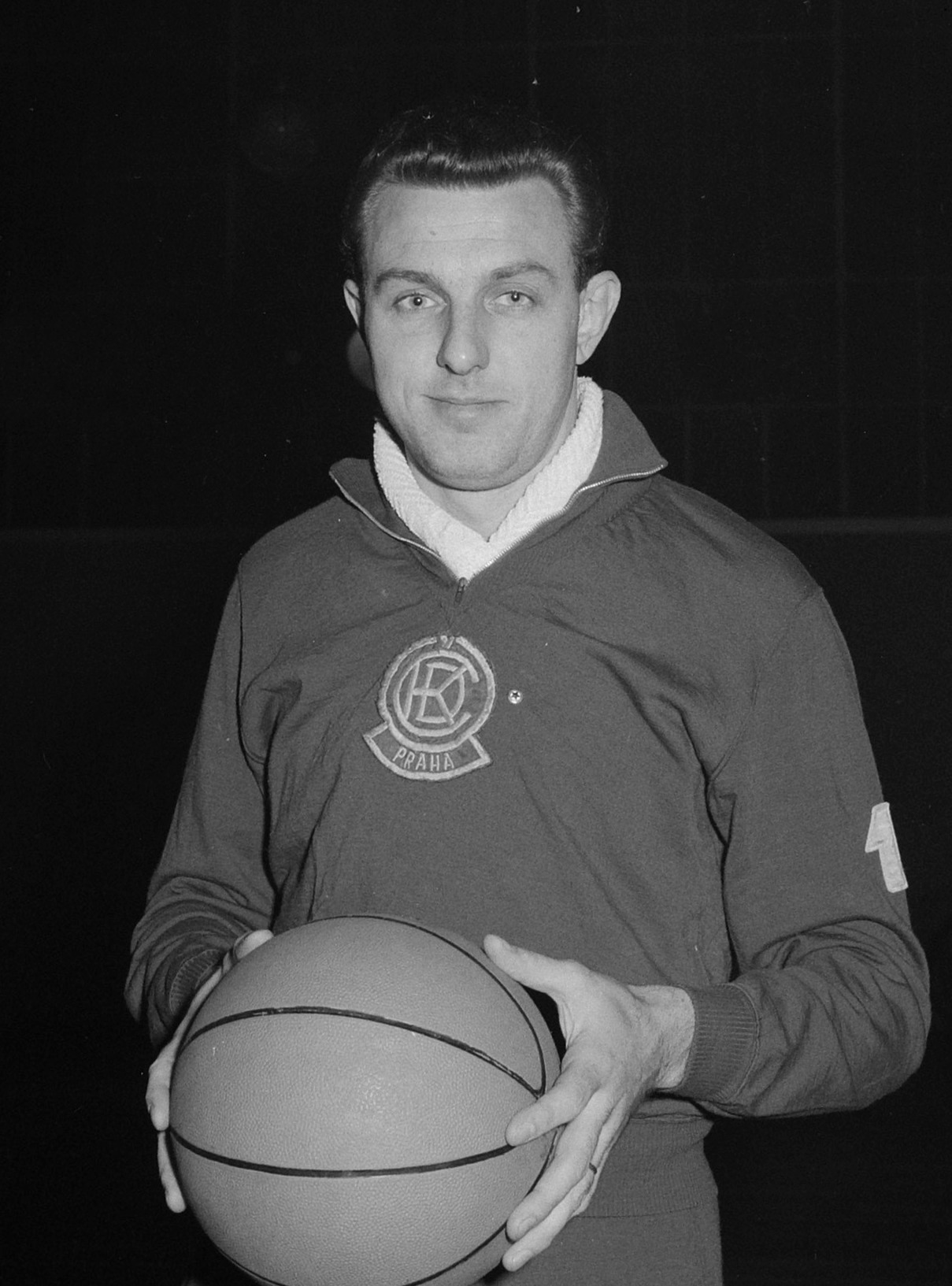
- Jiří Baumruk in 1960

Personal information
- Listed height: 1.86 m (6 ft 1 in)
- Listed weight: 84 kg (185 lb)

Career information
- Playing career: 1950–1966
- Position: Small forward
- Coaching career: 1964–1979

Career history

Playing
- 1950–1951: Sparta Prague
- 1952–1953: Slavia Prague
- 1953–1954: Ekonom Prague
- 1954–1964: Sparta Prague
- 1965–1966: Tatran Prague

Coaching
- 1964–1965: Sparta Prague women
- 1965–1966: Tatran Prague
- 1966–1968: Slavia Prague
- 1969–1971: Candy Brugherio
- 1971–1979: Sparta Prague

Career highlights
- As player: FIBA EuroBasket MVP (1957); Czechoslovak League champion (1960); Czechoslovak 20th Century team (2001)

Jiří Baumruk (27 June 1930 – 23 November 1989) was a Czech professional basketball player and coach.

== Club career ==
Baumruk spent his club career playing with Slavia Prague (1952–1953), and namely with Sparta Prague (1950–1951, 1954–1964). With Sparta Prague, he earned nine medals in the Czechoslovak Basketball League (once champion, five times vice-champion, three times 3rd place). In the 1960–61 season, he and his team participated in the FIBA European Champions Cup (now called EuroLeague), and reached the quarterfinals.

== National team career ==
Baumruk represented the senior Czechoslovakia national team at the 1960 Pre-Olympic basketball tournament (scoring 68 points in 5 games), and a further two times in the Summer Olympic Games 1952 (4 points in 2 games), 1960 (147 points in 8 games), and in six EuroBaskets, being the MVP of the EuroBasket 1957.

With the national team, he won three silver medals at EuroBasket, in France 1951, Hungary 1955, and Turkey 1959; and a bronze medal at the EuroBasket in Bulgaria 1957. In 1960, with the national team, he finished in fifth place at the 1960 Summer Olympic Games, and he was the team's leading scorer, with an average of 18.4 points per game.
