= Petr Novický =

Czech basketball player

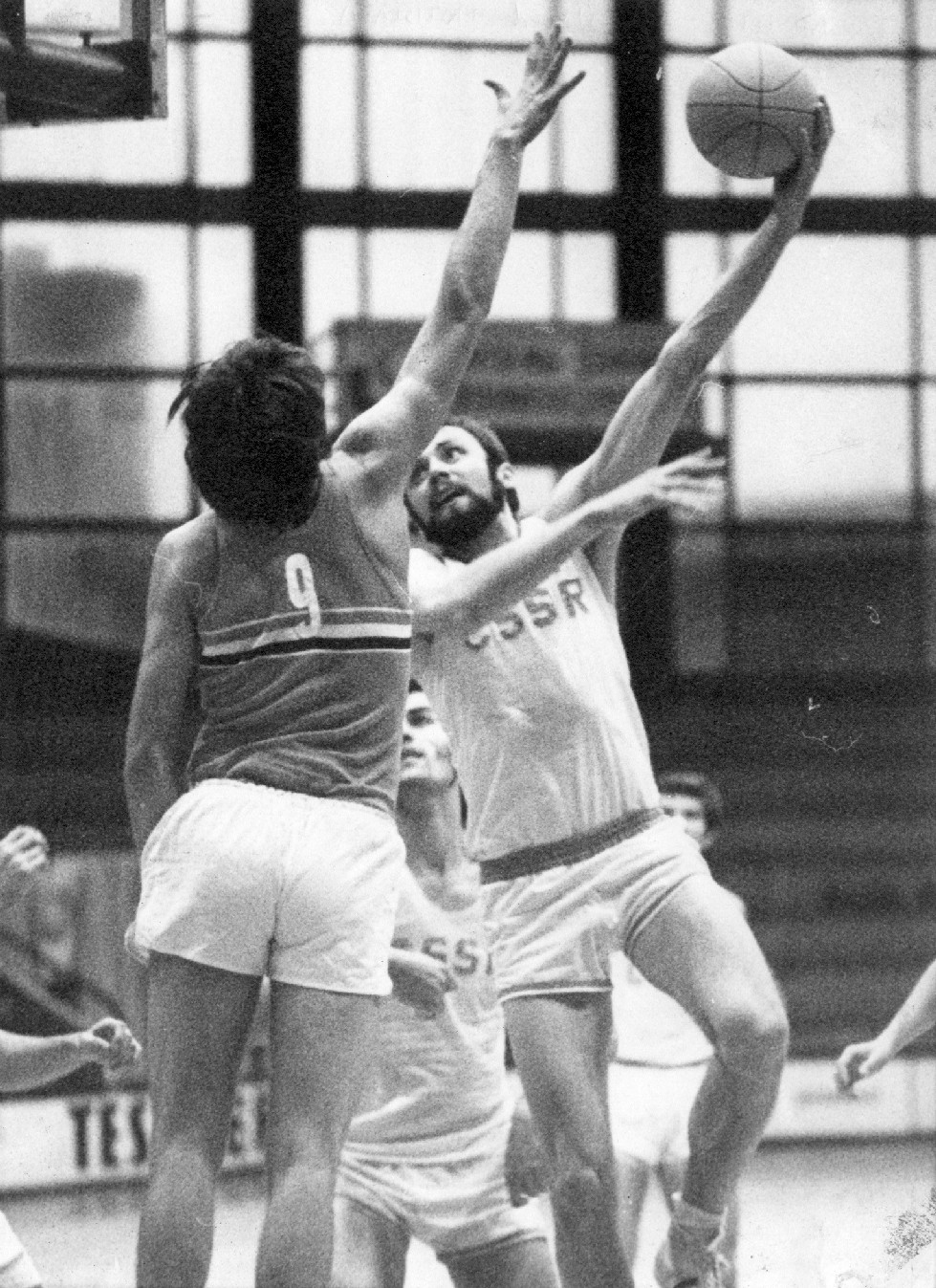
- Novický (right) playing for Czechoslovakia

Personal information
- Born: March 26, 1948 (age 78) Olomouc, Czechoslovakia
- Listed height: 6 ft 8 in (2.03 m)
- Listed weight: 216 lb (98 kg)

Petr Novický (born 26 March 1948) was a basketball player who represented the Czechoslovakia national basketball team between 1969 and 1975. He took part in the 1972 Summer Olympics as well as the 1970 FIBA World Championship and three editions of the FIBA EuroBasket competition.
