= François Dauphin =

Canadian handball player (born 1953)

François Dauphin (born July 6, 1953 in Saint-Norbert, Quebec) is a former Canadian handball player who competed in the 1976 Summer Olympics.

He was part of the Canadian handball team, which finished eleventh in the 1976 Olympic tournament. He played all five matches and scored three goals.
