= James McDougall (cricketer) =

Scottish cricketer and British Army officer

Personal information
- Full name: James Currie McDougall
- Born: 5 January 1890; Kilcalmonell, Argyllshire, Scotland
- Died: 23 February 1957 (aged 67); Clachan, Argyllshire, Scotland
- Batting: Unknown
- Bowling: Unknown

Domestic team information
- Years: Team
- 1924/25: Europeans

Career statistics
Competition	First-class
Matches	1
Runs scored	13
Batting average	6.50
100s/50s	–/–
Top score	13
Balls bowled	?
Wickets	1
Bowling average	168.00
5 wickets in innings	–
10 wickets in match	–
Best bowling	1/110
Catches/stumpings	3/–
- Source: ESPNcricinfo, 21 November 2022

James Currie McDougall CIE (5 January 1890 – 23 February 1957) was a Scottish first-class cricketer, British Army officer and an officer in the Imperial Civil Service.

The son of Archibald McDougall, he was born in April 1876 at Kilcalmonell, Kilcalmonell, Argyllshire. After completing his education, McDougall matriculated to the University of Edinburgh, graduating in 1914. McDougall served in the First World War, being commissioned as a second lieutenant on probation into the Argyll and Sutherland Highlanders in August 1916. McDougall served later in the war with the North Staffordshire Regiment and the 1st Duke of Wellington's Regiment, seeing action with the latter in the Mesopotamian campaign and the Battle of Baku. He ended the war with the rank of lieutenant, which he obtained in February 1918. Following the war, he joined the Imperial Civil Service in British India in December 1920 as an assistant director of agriculture. While in India, McDougall made a single appearance in first-class cricket for the Europeans in March 1925 against the Muslims at Lahore in the Lahore Tournament. Batting twice in the match, he was run out in the Europeans first innings for 13 runs, while in their second innings he was dismissed without scoring by Abdus Salaam. With the ball, he took a single wicket.

In 1925, he was appointed deputy director of agriculture and in 1928 he took up the post of principal at the Agricultural College in Nagpur. He was later appointed director of agriculture for the Central Provinces and Berar in October 1935. McDougall was made a Companion of the Order of the Indian Empire in the 1942 New Year Honours. He retired in January 1945, returning to Scotland, where he died at Clachan in February 1957.
