= John MacLeod (water polo) =

Canadian water polo player (born 1957)

Personal information
- Nationality: Canadian
- Born: 21 February 1957 (age 68)

Sport
- Sport: Water polo

John MacLeod (born 21 February 1957) is a Canadian water polo player. He competed in the men's tournament at the 1976 Summer Olympics.
