= Mohamed Saleh El-Shikshaki =

Egyptian volleyball player (born 1951)

Personal information
- Nationality: Egyptian
- Born: 21 January 1951 (age 74)

Sport
- Sport: Volleyball

Mohamed Saleh El-Shikshaki (born 21 January 1951) is an Egyptian volleyball player. He competed in the men's tournament at the 1976 Summer Olympics.
