= Mary Dempster =

Canadian volleyball player (born 1955)

Personal information
- Born: 12 February 1955 (age 70) Winnipeg, Manitoba, Canada

Sport
- Sport: Volleyball

Mary Dempster (born 12 February 1955) is a Canadian volleyball player. She competed in the women's tournament at the 1976 Summer Olympics.
