= Aysir Mohamed El-Zalabani =

Egyptian volleyball player (born 1947)

Personal information
- Nationality: Egyptian
- Born: 1 August 1947 (age 77)

Sport
- Sport: Volleyball

Aysir Mohamed El-Zalabani (born 1 August 1947) is an Egyptian volleyball player. He competed in the men's tournament at the 1976 Summer Olympics.
