= Mariette Houle =

Canadian handball player (born 1954)

Mariette Houle (born July 10, 1954) is a former Canadian handball player who competed in the 1976 Summer Olympics. Houle was born in Saint-Jean-sur-Richelieu.

She was part of the Canadian handball team, which finished sixth in the Olympic tournament. She played all five matches.
