= Kathy Girvan =

Canadian volleyball player (born 1954)

Personal information
- Nationality: Canadian
- Born: 13 August 1954 (age 71) Comox, British Columbia, Canada

Sport
- Sport: Volleyball

Kathy Girvan (born 13 August 1954) is a Canadian former volleyball player. She competed in the women's tournament at the 1976 Summer Olympics.
