= Miroslav Nekola =

Czech volleyball player (born 1947)

Personal information
- Nationality: Czech
- Born: 1 December 1947 (age 77); Prague, Czechoslovakia

Sport
- Sport: Volleyball

Miroslav Nekola (born 1 December 1947) is a Czech volleyball player and coach. He competed at the 1972 Summer Olympics and the 1976 Summer Olympics. Between 1985 and 1987, he was an assistant coach of the Czechoslovakia men's national volleyball team which won a silver medal at the 1985 Men's European Volleyball Championship; between 1996 and 1998 he was the main coach of the Czech Republic men's national volleyball team. His son Michal Nekola is a volleyball player and coach as well.
