= Doug Pready =

Canadian field hockey player

Doug Pready (born September 20, 1954 in Vancouver, British Columbia) is a Canadian former field hockey player who competed in the 1976 Summer Olympics.
