= Danielle Chenard =

Canadian handball player (1957-1986)

Danielle Chenard (December 12, 1957 – May 20, 1986) was a Canadian handball player who competed in the 1976 Summer Olympics. She was born in Montreal, Quebec.

She was part of the Canadian handball team, which finished sixth in the Olympic tournament. She played all five matches.
