= Manon Charette =

Canadian handball player (1955-2006)

Manon Charette (March 14, 1955 in Salaberry-de-Valleyfield, Quebec, Canada – January 1, 2006 in Richmond, British Columbia) was a Canadian handball player who competed in the 1976 Summer Olympics.

She was part of the Canadian handball team, which finished sixth in the 1976 Olympic tournament. She played all five matches and scored three goals.

For many years, Charette worked at St. Paul's Hospital Foundation, as Director of Finance.

Manon died from cancer on January 1, 2006 in Richmond, British Columbia.
