= Metwali Mohamed =

Egyptian volleyball player (born 1949)

Personal information
- Nationality: Egyptian
- Born: 4 January 1949 (age 76)

Sport
- Sport: Volleyball

Metwali Mohamed (born 4 January 1949) is an Egyptian volleyball player. He competed in the men's tournament at the 1976 Summer Olympics.
