= Vladimír Vondráček (cyclist) =

Czech cyclist

Personal information
- Born: 22 May 1949 (age 77) Znojmo, Czechoslovakia

Cycling career
- Sport: Cycling

Vladimír Vondráček (22 May 1949) is a Czech former cyclist. He competed in the individual road race and team time trial events at the 1976 Summer Olympics.
