= Patty Olson =

Canadian volleyball player (born 1958)

Personal information
- Born: 30 November 1958 (age 66) Wainwright, Alberta, Canada

Sport
- Sport: Volleyball

Patty Olson (born 30 November 1958) is a Canadian volleyball player. She competed in the women's tournament at the 1976 Summer Olympics.
