= Barbara Dalton =

Canadian volleyball player (born 1949)

Personal information
- Nationality: Canadian
- Born: 6 May 1949 (age 76) Vancouver, British Columbia, Canada

Sport
- Sport: Volleyball

Barbara Dalton (born 6 May 1949) is a Canadian volleyball player. She competed in the women's tournament at the 1976 Summer Olympics.
