= Ptak =

Ptak is a Polish surname (meaning "bird"), and may refer to:

- Alexander Ptak (born 1977), professional footballer
- Barbara Ptak (1930–2025), Polish costume designer
- Bernard Ptak (born 1954), Polish politician
- Claire Ptak, British baker
- Franciszek Ptak (1859–1936), Polish politician
- Krzysztof Ptak (1954–2016), Polish cinematographer
- Robt Ptak (born 1970), American guitarist and musician
- Tomasz Ptak (born 1992), Polish footballer
- Włodzimierz Ptak (1928–2019), Polish immunologist

== See also ==
- Ptak (Włodzickie Hills), a hill in Lower Silesian Voivodeship, Poland
