= Mike Mouat =

Canadian field hockey player

Mike Mouat (born March 20, 1954) is a Canadian former field hockey player who competed in the 1976 Summer Olympics. Mouat was born in Vancouver, British Columbia.
