= Lance Carey =

Canadian field hockey player

Lance Carey (born September 21, 1945 in Vancouver, British Columbia) is a Canadian former field hockey player who competed in the 1976 Summer Olympics.
