= Miho Matsuoka =

Japanese basketball player

Personal information
- Nationality: Japanese
- Born: 11 July 1953 (age 71); Fukuoka, Japan

Sport
- Sport: Basketball

Miho Matsuoka (松岡 美保, Matsuoka Miho, born 11 July 1953) is a Japanese basketball player. She competed in the women's tournament at the 1976 Summer Olympics.
