= Mahmoud Mohamed Farag =

Egyptian volleyball player (born 1954)

Personal information
- Nationality: Egyptian
- Born: 4 September 1954 (age 70)

Sport
- Sport: Volleyball

Mahmoud Mohamed Farag (born 4 September 1954) is an Egyptian volleyball player. He competed in the men's tournament at the 1976 Summer Olympics.
