= Jiří Konopásek =

Czech basketball player

Personal information
- Born: 16 April 1946 (age 80) Prague, Czechoslovakia
- Listed height: 5 ft 10 in (1.78 m)
- Listed weight: 165 lb (75 kg)

Career information
- Playing career: 1964–1978
- Position: Point guard

Career history
- 1964–1973: Slavia VŠ Praha
- 1973–1974: Rudá Hvězda Pardubice
- 1974–1978: Slavia VŠ Praha

Career highlights
- FIBA Saporta Cup champion (1969); 6× Czechoslovak League champion (1965, 1966, 1969–1972); Czechoslovak League All-Star Five (1976)
Medals
Representing Czechoslovakia
Men's basketball
EuroBasket
Bronze medal – third place	1969 Italy
Bronze medal – third place	1977 Belgium

Jiří Konopásek (born 16 April 1946) is a Czech former basketball player and coach.

== Club career ==
During his club career, Konopásek won six Czechoslovak League championships (1965, 1966, 1969, 1970, 1971, and 1972). He also won the European-wide secondary level FIBA Saporta Cup championship, in the 1968–69 season.

== National team career ==
With the senior Czechoslovak national team, Konopásek competed in the men's tournament at the 1972 Summer Olympics and the 1976 Summer Olympics. With Czechoslovakia, he also won bronze medals at the 1969 EuroBasket, and the 1977 EuroBasket.
