= Nicole Génier =

Canadian handball player (born 1955)

Nicole Génier (born October 23, 1955) is a Canadian former handball player who competed in the 1976 Summer Olympics.

Born in Saint-Jean-sur-Richelieu, Quebec, Génier was part of the Canadian handball team, which finished sixth in the Olympic tournament. She played four matches.
