= Gaétan Turcotte =

Canadian water polo player (1954–2022)

Personal information
- Born: 10 October 1954 Quebec City, Quebec, Canada
- Died: 20 March 2022 (aged 67) Quebec City, Quebec, Canada

Sport
- Sport: Water polo
Medal record
Representing Canada
Pan American Games
Bronze medal – third place	1979 San Juan	Team competition

Gaétan Turcotte (10 October 1954 – 20 March 2022) was a Canadian water polo player. He competed in the men's tournament at the 1976 Summer Olympics and won the bronze medal at the 1979 Pan American Games.
