= Ihab Ibrahim Hussein =

Egyptian volleyball player (born 1951)

Personal information
- Nationality: Egyptian
- Born: 8 January 1951 (age 74)

Sport
- Sport: Volleyball

Ihab Ibrahim Hussein (born 8 January 1951) is an Egyptian volleyball player. He competed in the men's tournament at the 1976 Summer Olympics.
