= Connie Lebrun =

Canadian volleyball player (born 1955)

Personal information
- Full name: Constance Lebrun
- Nationality: Canadian
- Born: 10 April 1955 (age 71) St. George's, Bermuda

Sport
- Sport: Volleyball

Connie Lebrun (born 10 April 1955) is a Canadian former volleyball player. She competed in the women's tournament at the 1976 Summer Olympics in Montreal. She also competed at the 1975 Pan American Games, and the FISU World University Games in 1973 in Moscow and 1977 in Sofia, Bulgaria.

Lebrun developed her volleyball skills in Winnipeg playing at Kelvin High School and the University of Manitoba.

Lebrun later became a physician and went to seven more Olympic games as a member of the Team Canada medical staff. That Olympic journey began at the 1996 Summer Olympics in Atlanta, continued in Sydney in 2000, Athens in 2004, and 2008 in Beijing, where she was the Assistant Chief Medical officer.

Her first Winter Olympics experience came at the 2006 Winter Olympics in Torino, Italy, where she supported the snowboarding team. That led Lebrun to be the team physician and medical director for Team Canada's snowboarders for the 2010 Winter Olympics,. At the 2014 Winter Olympics in Sochi, Russia, Lebrun was the Chief Medical Officer for Team Canada.

As well as her Olympic Games experiences, Lebrun was also involved at the 2003, 1991 and 1987 Pan American Games, the 1994 Commonwealth Games, the 1999 and 1989 World University Games and the 1993 Jeux de la Francophonie. She was the Chief Medical Officer for the 2001 Canada Games in London, Ontario.

Lebrun is currently a professor in the Family Medicine Department in Faculty of Medicine & Dentistry at the University of Alberta. Previously, she was the director of the Glen Sather Sports Medicine Clinic in Edmonton.

== Honors ==
In 2026, Lebrun will be inducted into Volleyball Canada's Hall of Fame as part of that 1976 Olympic team. Lebrun was inducted into Volleyball Manitoba's Hall of Fame in 2017. She is included in the University of Manitoba's Bison Walkway of Honour.

In 2010, Lebrun was granted a Citation Award by the American College of Sports Medicine in recognition of her significant and important contributions to sports medicine and the exercise sciences.
