= Joanes Rail =

Canadian handball player (born 1958)

Joanes Rail (born November 24, 1958, in Kirkland Lake) is a Canadian former handball player who competed in the 1976 Summer Olympics.

She was part of the Canadian handball team, which finished sixth in the Olympic tournament. She played two matches.
