= Stan Thorseth =

Canadian handball player (born 1951)

Stan Thorseth (born December 26, 1951, in Saskatoon) is a former Canadian handball player who competed in the 1976 Summer Olympics.

He was part of the Canadian handball team which finished eleventh in the 1976 Olympic tournament. He played one match.
