= Monique Prud'homme =

Canadian handball player (born 1957)

Monique Prud'homme (born September 23, 1957) is a former Canadian handball player who competed in the 1976 Summer Olympics.

Born in Saint-Jean-sur-Richelieu, Quebec, Prud'homme was part of the Canadian handball team, which finished sixth in the Olympic tournament. She played all five matches.
