= Pavla Davidová =

Czech basketball player

Personal information
- Nationality: Czech
- Born: 12 November 1956 (age 68); Brno, Czechoslovakia

Sport
- Sport: Basketball

Pavla Davidová (born 12 November 1956), Pavla Podivinová by marriage, is a Czech basketball player. She competed in the women's tournament at the 1976 Summer Olympics.
