= Donna Hobin =

Canadian basketball player

Personal information
- Born: 10 April 1956 Ottawa, Ontario, Canada
- Died: 28 August 2025 (aged 69)

Sport
- Sport: Basketball

Donna Hobin (10 April 1956 – 28 August 2025) was a Canadian basketball player. She competed in the women's tournament at the 1976 Summer Olympics.
