= Kerry Klostermann =

Canadian volleyball player (born 1947)

Personal information
- Nationality: Canadian
- Born: 19 August 1947 (age 77); Bethesda, Maryland, United States

Sport
- Sport: Volleyball

Kerry Klostermann (born 19 August 1947) is a Canadian volleyball player. He competed in the men's tournament at the 1976 Summer Olympics.
