= Dušan Žáček =

Czech basketball player

Personal information
- Nationality: Czech
- Born: 8 June 1961 (age 63); Šumperk, Czechoslovakia

Sport
- Sport: Basketball

Dušan Žáček (born 8 June 1961) is a Czech former basketball player. He competed in the men's tournament at the 1980 Summer Olympics.
