= Jan Blažek (basketball) =

Czech basketball player

Personal information
- Nationality: Czech
- Born: 13 September 1947
- Died: 29 September 2016 (aged 69)

Sport
- Sport: Basketball

Jan Blažek (13 September 1947 – 29 September 2016) was a Czech basketball player. He competed in the men's tournament at the 1972 Summer Olympics.

== See also ==
- Czechoslovak Basketball League career stats leaders
