= James MacDougall =

Canadian field hockey player

James MacDougall (born 30 June 1944) is a Canadian former field hockey player who competed in the 1976 Summer Olympics.
