= Ľudmila Chmelíková =

Slovak basketball player

Personal information
- Nationality: Slovak
- Born: 30 January 1955 (age 71) Banská Bystrica, Czechoslovakia

Sport
- Sport: Basketball

Ľudmila Pěčová-Chmelíková (née Chmelíková; born 30 January 1955) is a Slovak former basketball player. She competed in the women's tournament at the 1976 Summer Olympics.
