= Marta Pechová =

Czech basketball player

Personal information
- Nationality: Czech
- Born: 20 March 1952 (age 73); Prague, Czechoslovakia

Sport
- Sport: Basketball

Marta Pechová (born 20 March 1952) is a Czech basketball player. She competed in the women's tournament at the 1976 Summer Olympics.

She was born Markéta Jirásková on 20 March 1952 in Prague. She married Pavel Pech, who was her classmate during her studies at University of Chemistry and Technology, Prague, after the 1976 Olympics.
