= Lenka Nechvátalová =

Czech basketball player

Personal information
- Nationality: Czech
- Born: 27 February 1955 (age 70); Brno, Czechoslovakia

Sport
- Sport: Basketball

Lenka Nechvátalová (born 27 February 1955) is a Czech basketball player. She competed in the women's tournament at the 1976 Summer Olympics.
