= Josef Křepela =

Slovak basketball player

Personal information
- Nationality: Slovak
- Born: 22 January 1924 České Budějovice, Czechoslovakia
- Died: 1 April 1974 (aged 50) Sliač, Czechoslovakia

Sport
- Sport: Basketball

Josef Křepela (22 January 1924 – 1 April 1974) was a Slovak basketball player. He competed in the men's tournament at the 1948 Summer Olympics.
