= Josef Ezr =

Czech basketball player

Personal information
- Born: 3 October 1923 Prague, Czechoslovakia
- Died: 2 November 2013 (aged 90)

Career highlights
- Czechoslovak 20th Century Team (2001)
Medals
Representing Czechoslovakia
Men's basketball
EuroBasket
Gold medal – first place	1946 Switzerland
Silver medal – second place	1947 Czechoslovakia

Josef Ezr (3 October 1923 – 2 November 2013) was a Czech basketball player. He was voted to the Czechoslovak 20th Century Team in 2001.

== National team career ==
With the senior Czechoslovakia national team, Ezr competed in the men's tournament at the 1948 Summer Olympics, and the 1952 Summer Olympics. With Czechoslovakia, he also won the gold medal at the 1946 EuroBasket, and the silver medal at the 1947 EuroBasket.
