= Fleurette Campeau =

Canadian fencer (1941–2022)

Personal information
- Born: 10 January 1941 Montreal, Quebec, Canada
- Died: September 2022 (aged 81)

Sport
- Sport: Fencing

Fleurette Campeau (10 January 1941 – September 2022) was a Canadian fencer. She competed in the women's team foil event at the 1976 Summer Olympics.
