= Hana Doušová =

Czech basketball player (1949–2023)

Personal information
- Nationality: Czech
- Born: 5 March 1949; Turnov, Czechoslovakia
- Died: 15 September 2023 (aged 74)

Sport
- Sport: Basketball

Hana Doušová (5 March 1949 – 15 September 2023) was a Czech basketball player. She competed in the women's tournament at the 1976 Summer Olympics. Doušová died on 15 September 2023, at the age of 74.
