= Kazuyo Hayashida =

Japanese basketball player

Personal information
- Nationality: Japanese
- Born: 30 December 1953 (age 71); Fukuoka, Japan

Sport
- Sport: Basketball

Kazuyo Hayashida (林田 和代, Hayashida Kazuyo, born 30 December 1953) is a Japanese basketball player. She competed in the women's tournament at the 1976 Summer Olympics.
