= Elias Romanchych =

Canadian volleyball player (born 1951)

Personal information
- Born: 23 February 1951 (age 74); Maple Creek, Saskatchewan, Canada

Sport
- Sport: Volleyball

Elias Romanchych (born 23 February 1951) is a Canadian volleyball player. He competed in the men's tournament at the 1976 Summer Olympics.
