= Ladislav Trpkoš =

Czech basketball player (1915–2004)

Career highlights
- Czechoslovak 20th Century Team (2001)
Medals
Representing Czechoslovakia
Men's basketball
EuroBasket
Gold medal – first place	1946 Switzerland
Silver medal – second place	1947 Czechoslovakia

Ladislav Trpkoš (17 January 1915 – 30 November 2004) was a Czech basketball player from Vysoké Mýto. He was voted to the Czechoslovak 20th Century Team in 2001.

== National team career ==
Trpkoš competed with the senior Czechoslovak national team at the 1936 Summer Olympics. With Czechoslovakia, he won the gold medal at the 1946 EuroBasket, and the silver medal at the 1947 EuroBasket. He also competed with Czechoslovakia at the 1948 Summer Olympics.
