= Vlastimil Lenert =

Czech volleyball player (1950–2023)

Vlastimír Lenert
Personal information
- Nationality: Czech
- Born: 20 February 1950 Kopeček u Olomouce, Czechoslovakia
- Died: 23 July 2023 (aged 73) Liberec, Czechia

Sport
- Sport: Volleyball

Vlastimír Lenert (20 February 1950 – 23 July 2023) was a Czech volleyball player. He competed at the 1976 Summer Olympics and the 1980 Summer Olympics.
