= Bev Barnes =

Canadian basketball player

Personal information
- Born: 9 August 1951 Ottawa, Ontario, Canada
- Died: 16 August 2016 (aged 65)

Sport
- Sport: Basketball

Bev Barnes (9 August 1951 – 16 August 2016) was a Canadian basketball player. She competed in the women's tournament at the 1976 Summer Olympics.
