= Ed Alexiuk =

Canadian volleyball player (born 1952)

Personal information
- Born: 17 May 1952 (age 72); Winnipeg, Manitoba, Canada

Sport
- Sport: Volleyball

Ed Alexiuk (born 17 May 1952) is a Canadian volleyball player. He competed in the men's tournament at the 1976 Summer Olympics.
