= Boris Lukášik =

Slovak basketball player

Personal information
- Nationality: Slovak
- Born: 24 February 1935 (age 90); Ružomberok, Czechoslovakia

Sport
- Sport: Basketball

Boris Lukášik (born 24 February 1935) is a Slovak basketball player. He competed in the men's tournament at the 1960 Summer Olympics.
