= Božena Miklošovičová =

Slovak basketball player

Personal information
- Nationality: Slovak
- Born: 27 February 1949 (age 76); Bratislava, Czechoslovakia

Sport
- Sport: Basketball

Božena Miklošovičová (born 27 February 1949) is a Slovak basketball player. She competed in the women's tournament at the 1976 Summer Olympics.
