= Pavel Řeřábek =

Czech volleyball player (born 1952)

Personal information
- Nationality: Czech
- Born: 21 May 1952 (age 72); Prague, Czechoslovakia

Sport
- Sport: Volleyball

Pavel Řeřábek (born 21 May 1952) is a Czech volleyball player. He competed at the 1976 Summer Olympics and the 1980 Summer Olympics.
