= Gregory Russell =

Canadian volleyball player (born 1951)

Personal information
- Nationality: Canadian
- Born: 10 July 1951 (age 73); Vancouver, British Columbia, Canada

Sport
- Sport: Volleyball

Gregory Russell (born 10 July 1951) is a Canadian volleyball player. He competed in the men's tournament at the 1976 Summer Olympics.
