= Josef Mikunda =

Czech volleyball player (born 1953)

Personal information
- Nationality: Czech
- Born: 27 August 1953 (age 71); Dolní Bečva, Czechoslovakia

Sport
- Sport: Volleyball

Josef Mikunda (born 27 August 1953) is a Czech volleyball player. He competed in the men's tournament at the 1976 Summer Olympics.
