= Vlasta Vrbková =

Czech basketball player

Personal information
- Nationality: Czech
- Born: 19 September 1953 (age 71); Kyjov, Czechoslovakia

Sport
- Sport: Basketball

Vlasta Vrbková (born 19 September 1953) is a Czech basketball player. She competed in the women's tournament at the 1976 Summer Olympics.
