= Ľudmila Králiková =

Slovak basketball player

Personal information
- Nationality: Slovak
- Born: 31 December 1953 (age 72) Bratislava, Czechoslovakia

Sport
- Sport: Basketball

Ľudmila Gajdošová-Králiková (née Králiková; born 31 December 1953) is a Slovak former basketball player. She competed in the women's tournament at the 1976 Summer Olympics.
