= Imre Nagy (painter) =

Hungarian painter (1893–1976)

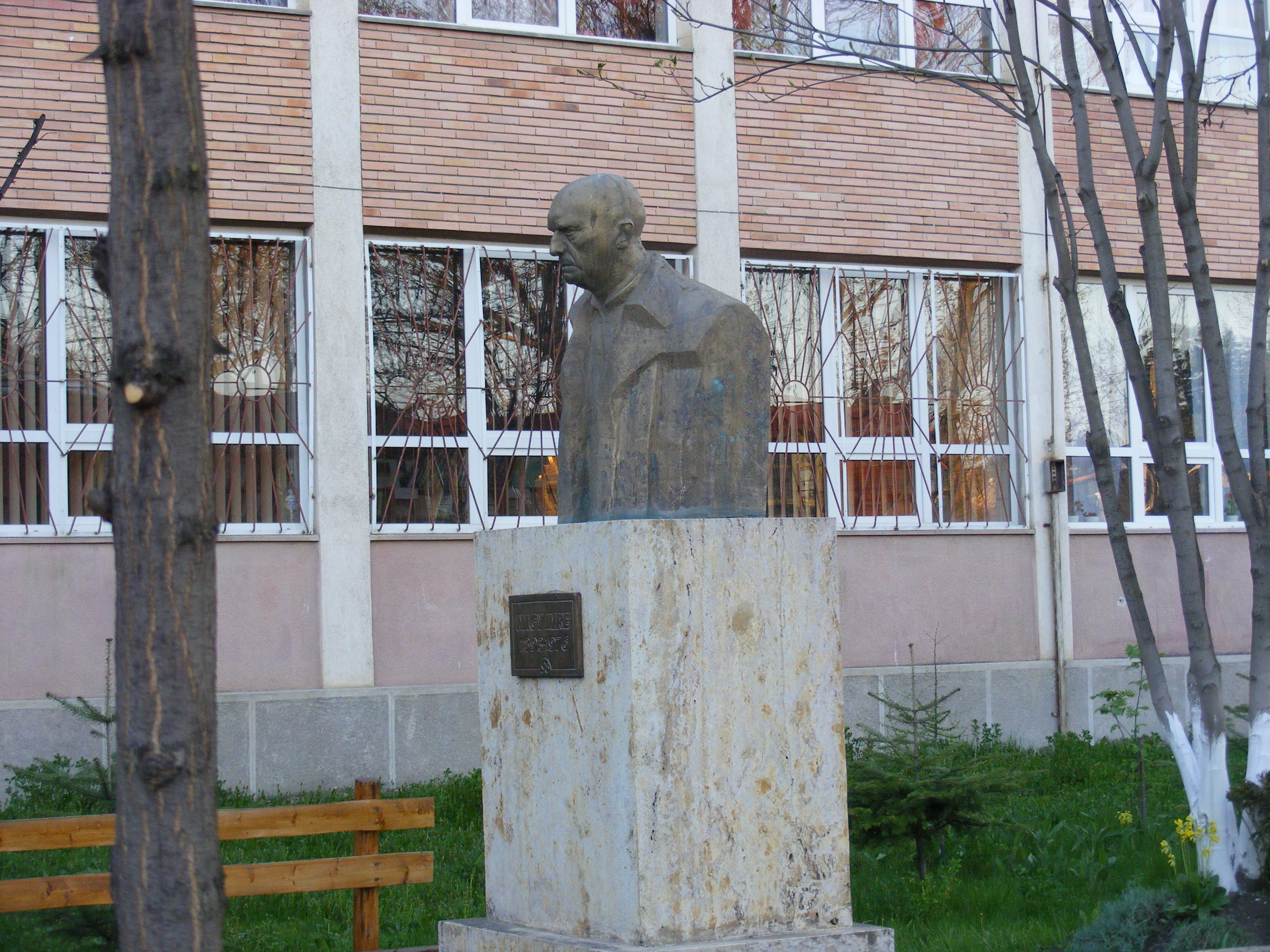
Bust of Imre Nagy in Miercurea Ciuc

Imre Nagy also Imre Zsögödi Nagy, Imre Nagy of Jigodin (25 July 1893 – 22 August 1976) was a Romanian-Hungarian painter, born in the part of Hungary that later became part of Romania.

After studying at the Budapest Art Academy, Nagy returned to his native village Jigodin in 1924, where he painted landscapes and the Szekler population in these landscapes.

Nagy was active as an artist for 54 years. He lived in a simple house with three rooms, which he expanded in 1966 with an art studio. All his working life he started working there every day at six o'clock in the morning, and this until a very old age.

Nagy died aged 82. His ashes are bricked into the outer wall of his birthplace in Jigodin. His personal items, including furniture and books, are displayed in this house. His large collection of straw hats and his two unfinished portraits are also on display there. In 1973, in honor of his eightieth birthday, a museum was built next to his birthplace. After Imre Nagy's death, the museum was inaugurated as a permanent exhibition of his work and of his art collection which consists of more than 6000 works.

Nagy was a contemporary of István Nagy, Jenő Gyárfás and Ferenc Márton. His painting Spre arca lui Noe ("Before Noah's Ark") inspired the poet Sándor Kányádi to write a poem on the back of Nagy's painting.

In 1939 he was awarded the Mihály Zichy Prize and in 1957 the Maistru al Artei Prize (prize for mastery of art).

His paintings are located in several museums in Transylvania. There is a street in Jigodin and a primary school in Miercurea Ciuc named after him.
