= John Paulsen (volleyball) =

Canadian volleyball player (born 1951)

Personal information
- Nationality: Canadian
- Born: 22 May 1951 (age 73); Copenhagen, Denmark

Sport
- Sport: Volleyball

John Paulsen (born 22 May 1951) is a Canadian volleyball player. He competed in the men's tournament at the 1976 Summer Olympics.
