= Jan Kozák =

Czech basketball player

Personal information
- Born: 5 July 1929 Brno, Czechoslovakia
- Died: 3 October 2016 (aged 87) Ostrava, Czech Republic

Career highlights
- Czechoslovak 20th Century Team (2001)
Medals
Representing Czechoslovakia
Men's basketball
EuroBasket
Silver medal – second place	1947 Czechoslovakia
Silver medal – second place	1951 France
Silver medal – second place	1955 Hungary

Jan Kozák (5 July 1929 – 3 October 2016) was a Czech basketball player. He was voted to the Czechoslovak 20th Century Team in 2001.

== National team career ==
Withe the senior Czechoslovakia national team, Kozák competed in the men's tournament at the 1948 Summer Olympics, and the 1952 Summer Olympics. With Czechoslovakia, he also won silver medals at the 1947 EuroBasket, the 1951 EuroBasket, and the 1955 EuroBasket.
