= Carole Bishop =

Canadian volleyball player (born 1949)

Personal information
- Nationality: Canadian
- Born: 2 December 1949 (age 75) Vancouver, British Columbia, Canada

Sport
- Sport: Volleyball

Carole Bishop (born 2 December 1949) is a Canadian volleyball player. She competed in the women's tournament at the 1976 Summer Olympics.
