= Martina Babková =

Czech basketball player

Personal information
- Nationality: Czech
- Born: 31 August 1950 (age 74); Děčín, Czechoslovakia

Sport
- Sport: Basketball

Martina Babková (born 31 August 1950) is a Czech basketball player. She competed in the women's tournament at the 1976 Summer Olympics.
