= Milan Šlambor =

Czech volleyball player (born 1953)

Personal information
- Nationality: Czech
- Born: 9 July 1953 (age 71); Hradec Králové, Czechoslovakia
- Height: 1.95 m (6 ft 5 in)

Sport
- Sport: Volleyball

Milan Šlambor (born 9 July 1953) is a Czech former volleyball player. He competed for Czechoslovakia in the men's tournament at the 1976 Summer Olympics, where his team finished in 5th place. He was also part of the fifth-placed Czechoslovakia team at the 1978 FIVB Men's Volleyball World Championship, as well as a three-time participant at the Men's European Volleyball Championship, where his nation finished sixth in 1975, 1977 and 1979. At club level he played for Chemička Ústí nad Labem, Dukla Liberec and Italian outfit Volley Udine, where he operated as a player-coach from 1982 to 1985.

== Personal life ==
Šlambor has three sons and a daughter, Lucie.
