= Beverley Bland =

Canadian basketball player

Personal information
- Nationality: Canadian
- Born: 23 November 1953 (age 71) Vancouver, British Columbia, Canada

Sport
- Sport: Basketball

Beverley Bland (born 23 November 1953) is a Canadian basketball player. She competed in the women's tournament at the 1976 Summer Olympics.
