= Larry Plenert =

Canadian volleyball player (born 1953)

Personal information
- Nationality: Canadian
- Born: July 17, 1953 Vancouver, British Columbia, Canada
- Died: February 5, 2020 (aged 66) Prince Albert, Saskatchewan, Canada

Sport
- Sport: Volleyball

Larry Plenert (born 17 July 1953 – 5 February 2020) was a Canadian volleyball player. He competed in the men's tournament at the 1976 Summer Olympics.

He graduated from John Oliver Secondary School in Vancouver and Canadian Mennonite University in Winnipeg.
