= Yvetta Polláková =

Slovak basketball player

Personal information
- Nationality: Slovak
- Born: 4 May 1953 (age 73) Prešov, Czechoslovakia

Sport
- Sport: Basketball

Yvetta Paulovičová-Polláková (née Polláková; born 4 May 1953) is a Slovak former basketball player. She competed in the women's tournament at the 1976 Summer Olympics.
