= Donald Michalski =

Canadian volleyball player (born 1955)

Personal information
- Born: 9 April 1955 (age 69); Winnipeg, Manitoba, Canada

Sport
- Sport: Volleyball

Donald Michalski (born 9 April 1955) is a Canadian volleyball player. He competed in the men's tournament at the 1976 Summer Olympics.
