= Imre Nagy (fencer) =

Hungarian fencer

Personal information
- Born: 7 May 1941 Kolozsvár, Hungary
- Died: 24 May 2011 (aged 70)

Sport
- Sport: Fencing

Imre Nagy (7 May 1941 – 24 May 2011) was a Canadian fencer. He competed in the team sabre event at the 1976 Summer Olympics.
