= Josef Vondrka =

Czech volleyball player (born 1952)

Personal information
- Nationality: Czech
- Born: 19 November 1952 (age 72); Třeboň, Czechoslovakia

Sport
- Sport: Volleyball

Josef Vondrka (born 19 November 1952) is a Czech volleyball player. He competed in the men's tournament at the 1976 Summer Olympics.
