= Ivana Kořinková =

Czech basketball player

Personal information
- Nationality: Czech
- Born: 20 October 1950 (age 74); Prague, Czechoslovakia

Sport
- Sport: Basketball

Ivana Kořinková (born 20 October 1950) is a Czech basketball player. She competed in the women's tournament at the 1976 Summer Olympics.
