= Vladimír Padrta =

Slovak basketball player

Personal information
- Nationality: Slovak
- Born: 7 October 1952; Brno, Czechoslovakia
- Died: 15 September 2009 (aged 56); Bratislava, Slovakia
- Height: 197 cm (6 ft 6 in)
- Weight: 94 kg (207 lb)

Sport
- Country: Czechoslovakia, Czechia
- Sport: Basketball

Vladimír Padrta (7 October 1952 – 15 September 2009) was a Slovak basketball player. He competed in the men's tournament at the 1976 Summer Olympics. Later he worked as a sport journalist and as a coach for Inter youth basketball team.

== See also ==
- Czechoslovak Basketball League career stats leaders
- 1976 Summer Olympics
