= Dana Ptáčková =

Czech basketball player

Personal information
- Nationality: Czech
- Born: 28 May 1952 (age 72); Olomouc, Czechoslovakia

Sport
- Sport: Basketball

Dana Ptáčková (born 28 May 1952) is a Czech basketball player. She competed in the women's tournament at the 1976 Summer Olympics.
