= Jaroslav Kantůrek =

Czech basketball player

Personal information
- Nationality: Czech
- Born: 17 August 1953 (age 71); Poděbrady, Czechoslovakia

Sport
- Sport: Basketball

Jaroslav Kantůrek (born 17 August 1953) is a Czech basketball player. He competed in the men's tournament at the 1976 Summer Olympics.

== See also ==
- Czechoslovak Basketball League career stats leaders
