= Vladimír Ptáček =

Czech basketball player (1954–2019)

Personal information
- Nationality: Czech
- Born: 7 November 1954; Prague, Czechoslovakia
- Died: 13 August 2019 (aged 64)

Sport
- Sport: Basketball

Vladimír Ptáček (7 November 1954 – 13 August 2019) was a Czech basketball player. He competed in the men's tournament at the 1976 Summer Olympics.
