= BK Dukla Praha =

- Leagues: NBL, Czech 1 League
- Founded: 1950
- Dissolved: 2005
- History: ATK Praha (1950–1956); ÚDA Praha (1956–1959); Dukla Praha (1959–2005)
- Location: Prague, Czech Republic
- Team colors: Red and yellow
- Championships: 3 Czechoslovak Championships
Home	Away

BK Dukla Praha (Czech: Basketbalový klub Dukla Praha) was a Czech (former military) basketball club from Prague.

== History ==
In the years 1950-1953 participated in the elite basketball league(CSBL) (1950-1951, 1951, 1952, 1953) under the name "ATK Praha" and ranked gradually on the 6th, 4th, 5th and 2nd place. Then, the club has named "ÚDA Praha" and won the top league three times in a row (in 1954, 1955, 1956) and include it in the record of the Czechoslovak league 5th place overall. Underpinning championship team were mainly representatives Miroslav Škeřík, Jaroslav Tetiva and Jaroslav Arrow.

With the reorganization of armed forces sports clubs by the communist government in 1956, was disbanded the basketball team. Plenty of players moved into the competitive club of Slovan Orbis, where the very next season won the championship.

The club renewed its activity and returned to the Czechoslovak league in season 1959-1960 under the name "Dukla Praha" (trainer D. Ozarčuk) finished in 9th place when its best player and scorer was representative Boris Lukášik. In the seasons 1960-61 and 1963-64 (then played her Václav Klaus) finished in 12th place out of 14 participants. In other years Dukla started in the second Czechoslovak league.

The club has played a number of players who represented Czechoslovakia.

== Honours ==
Czechoslovak League

- Winners (3): 1953–54, 1954–55, 1955–56
