= EuroBasket 1979 =

International basketball event

Campionato europeo maschile di pallacanestro 1979

Tournament details
- Host country: Italy
- Dates: 9–19 June
- Teams: 12
- Venues: 4 (in 4 host cities)

Final positions
- Champions: Soviet Union (12th title)
- Runners-up: Israel
- Third place: Yugoslavia
- Fourth place: Czechoslovakia

Tournament statistics
- MVP: (Israel) Miki Berkovich
- Top scorer: (Poland) Mieczysław Młynarski (27.1 points per game)

The 1979 FIBA European Championship, commonly called FIBA EuroBasket 1979, was the 21st FIBA EuroBasket regional basketball championship, held by FIBA Europe. Twelve national teams affiliated with the International Basketball Federation entered the competition. The competition was hosted by Italy. Mestre, Siena, Gorizia and Turin were the venues of the event.

== Venues ==
Mestre	Siena	Gorizia	Turin
PalaTaliercio; Capacity 4 000	PalaSclavo; Capacity 5 000	PalaGrappate; Capacity 5 500	PalaRuffini; Capacity 10 000

== Results ==
=== First round ===
In the preliminary round, the 12 teams were split up into three groups of four teams each. The top two teams in each group advanced to the final round (with the score between them counting in the final round as well) while the bottom two were sent to the classification round to play for 7th to 12th Places (with the score between them counting in the classification round as well)

==== Group A – Mestre ====
Team	Pld	W	L	PF	PA	PD	Pts
Czechoslovakia	3	3	0	238	204	+34	6
Italy	3	2	1	235	202	+33	5
Greece	3	1	2	211	223	−12	4
Belgium	3	0	3	213	268	−55	3

Czechoslovakia	90 – 69	Belgium
Czechoslovakia	74 – 67	Greece
Belgium	68 – 92	Greece
Belgium	76 – 86	Italy
Czechoslovakia	74 – 68	Italy
Greece	52 – 81	Italy

==== Group B – Siena ====
Team	Pld	W	L	PF	PA	PD	Pts
Spain	3	3	0	291	254	+37	6
Soviet Union	3	2	1	286	256	+30	5
Netherlands	3	1	2	254	279	−25	4
Bulgaria	3	0	3	234	276	−42	3

Netherlands	87 – 82	Bulgaria
Spain	85 – 81	Bulgaria
Soviet Union	104 – 71	Bulgaria
Netherlands	83 – 105	Spain
Netherlands	84 – 92	Soviet Union
Spain	101 – 90	Soviet Union

==== Group C – Gorizia ====
Team	Pld	W	L	PF	PA	PD	Pts
Israel	3	2	1	246	246	0	5
Yugoslavia	3	2	1	258	237	+21	5
Poland	3	1	2	258	264	−6	4
France	3	1	2	233	248	−15	4

Poland	85 – 76	France
France	92 – 83	Israel
Israel	86 – 78	Poland
Yugoslavia	76 – 77	Israel
Poland	95 – 102	Yugoslavia
Yugoslavia	80 – 65	France

=== Classification round – Turin ===
In the classification round played the teams that finish 3rd and 4th in their preliminary-round groups. Those teams played for the 7th to 12th Places.

Pos	Team	Pld	W	L	PF	PA	PD	Pts
7	Poland	5	4	1	435	405	+30	9
8	France	5	4	1	423	401	+22	9
9	Greece	5	3	2	418	381	+37	8
10	Netherlands	5	3	2	438	404	+34	8
11	Bulgaria	5	1	4	436	450	−14	6
12	Belgium	5	0	5	433	542	−109	5

Bulgaria	114 – 98	Belgium
France	111 – 98	Belgium
Netherlands	115 – 85	Belgium
Belgium	84 – 110	Poland
Bulgaria	77 – 80	France
Poland	85 – 78	Bulgaria
Bulgaria	85 – 100	Greece
Greece	74 – 76	France
Netherlands	75 – 79	Greece
Poland	77 – 73	Greece
Netherlands	67 – 80	France
Poland	78 – 94	Netherlands
Belgium	81 – 105	Greece
Netherlands	78 – 72	Bulgaria
Poland	89 – 82	France

=== Final round – Turin ===
The Teams that finish their preliminary-round groups in the 1st and 2nd places advanced to the final round. The first and second in this group will go to the final while the third and fourth places will go to a 3rd-place match.

Pos	Team	Pld	W	L	PF	PA	PD	Pts
1	Soviet Union	5	4	1	439	399	+40	9
2	Israel	5	3	2	408	435	−27	8
3	Yugoslavia	5	3	2	453	432	+21	8
4	Czechoslovakia	5	2	3	419	430	−11	7
5	Italy	5	2	3	403	417	−14	7
6	Spain	5	1	4	465	474	−9	6

Israel	94 – 93	Czechoslovakia
Czechoslovakia	107–100	Spain
Yugoslavia	97 – 79	Czechoslovakia
Czechoslovakia	66 – 71	Soviet Union
Israel	78 – 90	Italy
Italy	81 – 80	Spain
Italy	80 – 95	Yugoslavia
Italy	84 – 90	Soviet Union
Spain	84 – 88	Israel
Yugoslavia	108–100	Spain
Israel	71 – 92	Soviet Union
Yugoslavia	77 – 96	Soviet Union
Israel	77 – 76	Yugoslavia
Czechoslovakia	96 – 90	Italy
Spain	92 – 81	Soviet Union

=== Finals ===
==== 3rd-place match ====
Yugoslavia 99
Czechoslovakia 92

==== Final ====
19 June 1979
Soviet Union 98
Israel 76

1979 FIBA EuroBasket champions

Soviet Union
Twelfth title

== Final standings ==
Place	Team
1st place, gold medalist(s)	Soviet Union
2nd place, silver medalist(s)	Israel
3rd place, bronze medalist(s)	Yugoslavia
4.	Czechoslovakia
5.	Italy
6.	Spain
7.	Poland
8.	France
9.	Greece
10.	Netherlands
11.	Bulgaria
12.	Belgium

== Awards ==
1979 FIBA EuroBasket MVP: Miki Berkovich ( Israel)

All-Tournament Team
(Soviet Union) Sergei Belov
(Socialist Federal Republic of Yugoslavia) Dragan Kićanović
(Israel) Miki Berkovich (MVP)
(Socialist Federal Republic of Yugoslavia) Krešimir Ćosić
(Soviet Union) Vladimir Tkachenko

== Team rosters ==
1. Soviet Union: Sergei Belov (c), Anatoly Myshkin, Vladimir Tkachenko, Ivan Edeshko, Aleksander Belostenny, Stanislav Eremin, Valdemaras Chomičius, Alzhan Zharmukhamedov, Sergei Tarakanov, Vladimir Zhigili, Aleksander Salnikov, Andrei Lopatov (Coach: Alexander Gomelsky)

2. Israel: Mickey Berkowitz, Lou Silver, Motti Aroesti, Yehoshua "Shuki" Schwartz, Eric Menkin, Steve Kaplan, Boaz Yanai, Avigdor Moskowitz, Barry Leibowitz (c), Pinhas Hozez, Uri Ben-Ari (basketball), Shai Sharf (Coach: Ralph Klein)

3. Yugoslavia: Krešimir Ćosić, Mirza Delibašić, Dražen Dalipagić, Dragan Kićanović, Zoran Slavnić, Žarko Varajić, Željko Jerkov, Rajko Žižić, Peter Vilfan, Mihovil Nakić, Ratko Radovanović, Duje Krstulović (Coach: Petar Skansi)

4. Czechoslovakia: Kamil Brabenec, Zdenek Kos, Stanislav Kropilak, Jiri Pospisil, Vojtech Petr, Vlastimil Klimes, Vlastimil Havlik, Jaroslav Skála, Zdenek Dousa, Peter Rajniak, Gustav Hraska, Zdenek Bohm (Coach: Pavel Petera)
