= Czechoslovak Basketball League career stats leaders =

Czechoslovak Basketball League career stats leaders are the all-time stats leaders of the now defunct top-tier level professional basketball league of Czechoslovakia, the Czechoslovak Basketball League (CSBL). Czech Basketball Federation Hall of Fame induction in 2016, Slovak Basketball Association Hall of Fame induction in 2020.

== All-time career leading scorers of the Czechoslovak Basketball League (1962–63 to 1992–93) ==
The all-time top scoring leaders of the Czechoslovak Basketball League (CSBL), which was the top-tier level professional club basketball league of the former Czechoslovakia. Includes points scored between the 1962–63 season and the 1992–93 season.

Rank	Player	Total Points Scored
1	Jiří Zídek Sr.	10,838
2	Kamil Brabenec	10,726
3	Jan Bobrovský	9,915
4	Zdeněk Douša	8,822
5	Gustáv Hraška	8,460
6	Milan Voračka	8,305
7	Jaroslav Skála	7,742
8	Jiří Zedníček	7,333
9	Zdeněk Böhm	6,578
10	Jaroslav Beránek	6,561
11	Michal Ježdík	6,545
12	Stanislav Kropilák	6,505
13	Jiří Pospíšil	6,493
14	Vlastimil Havlík	6,308
15	Pavel Pekárek	5,780
16	Vojtěch Petr	5,746
17	Zdeněk Kos	5,673
18	Juraj Žuffa	5,558
19	Ivan Chrenka	5,365
20	Vladimír Padrta	5,307
21	Vlastimil Hrbáč	5,225
22	Josef Nečas	5,213
23	Miloš Kulich	5,189
24	Vladimír Vyoral	5,110
25	Jozef Michalko	5,063
26	Jozef Straka	4,996
27	Dušan Lukášik	4,944
28	Martin Brázda	4,726
29	Milan Kostka	4,692
30	Pavel Škuta	4,687
31	František Konvička	4,637
32	Jaroslav Kraus	4,626
33	Vlastibor Klimeš	4,573
34	Jan Blažek	4,519
35	Miloš Pažický	4,483
36	Peter Rajniak	4,402
37	Jaroslav Kantůrek	4,376
38	Jiří Růžička	4,352
39	Karel Baroch	4,287
40	Oto Matický	4,239
41	Gerald Dietl	4,202
42	Justin Sedlák	4,154
43	Bronislav Sako	4,140
44	Blažej Mašura	4,080
45	Peter Orgler	4,046
46	Dušan Medvecký	4,030
47	Josef Šťastný	4,024
48	Robert Mifka	4,003
49	Pavol Bojanovský	3,915
50	Marian Kotleba	3,684

== See also ==
- Czechoslovak League
- Czech Player of the Year
- Slovak Player of the Year
- Czech All-20th Century Team
