= List of the best Czech basketball players of the 20th century =

The Czech Basketball Federation and The Association of Czech Basketball League Clubs, announced the Czechoslovak All-20th Century Basketball Team. A total of twenty-five basketball players were selected for the All-Century Team. It was decided by a vote of fans, sports journalists, and basketball experts. The results were announced on 16 June 2001. Jiří Zídek Sr., was chosen as The Best Czech Basketball Player of the 20th Century.

== Czechoslovak All-20th Century Basketball Team ==
Rank	Player	Born	Olympics appearances	World Cup appearances	EuroBasket appearances	Gold medals	Silver medals	Bronze medals	Individual achievements
1.	Jiří Zídek Sr.	1944	1	2	6		1	1	2× FIBA European Selection Team (1966, 1967)
2.	Kamil Brabenec	1951	3	2	8		1	2	2× FIBA European Selection Team (1977, 1978)
3.	Ivan Mrázek	1926	2		5	1	3		EuroBasket Top Scorer (1951); EuroBasket MVP (1951)
4.	Jiří Zedníček	1945	1	2	5		1	1	EuroBasket MVP (1967); 5× FIBA European Selection Team (1966, 1967, 1969, 1971, 1972)
5.	František Konvička	1939	1		6		2	1	2× FIBA European Selection Team (1965, 1968)
5.	Jan Bobrovský	1945	1	2	6		1	1	FIBA European Selection Team (1965)
7.	Jiří Baumruk	1930	2		6		3	1	EuroBasket MVP (1957)
8.	Jaroslav Šíp	1930	1		5		3	1	
9.	Ladislav Trpkoš	1915	2		2	1	1		
10.	Miroslav Škeřík	1924	1		5		3	1	EuroBasket Top Scorer (1955)
11.	Jiří Pospíšil	1950	3	2	5			1	
12.	Zdeněk Kos	1951	3	3	7			2	
13.	Jiří Růžička	1941	1	1	5		1	1	FIBA European Selection Team (1967)
14.	Zdeněk Bobrovský	1933	2		5		2	1	
15.	Vladimír Pištělák	1940	1		5		1	1	2× FIBA European Selection Team (1965, 1968)
16.	Emil Velenský	1920			2	1	1		
17.	Jiří "George" Zídek Jr.	1973							The first Czech player to play in the NBA (1995–1998)
18.	Jan Kozák	1929	2		5		3		
19.	Josef Ezr	1923	2		2	1	1		
20.	Vlastimil Havlík	1957	1	2	5		1	1	
21.	Zdeněk Douša	1947	3	3	3			1	
21.	Zdeněk Rylich	1931	1		5		3	1	
23.	Jaroslav Tetiva	1932	2		6		2	1	
24.	Gustav Hraška	1953	2	3	6			2	
25.	Bohumil Tomášek	1936	1		5		2		FIBA European Selection Team (1967)

== See also ==
- Icelandic basketball team of the 20th century
- Czechoslovakia national team
- Czech Republic national team
- Czech Player of the Year
- Slovak Player of the Year
- Czechoslovak League career stats leaders
