= EuroBasket 1977 =

International basketball event

Europees kampioenschap basketbal mannen 1977 Championnat d'Europe masculin de basket-ball 1977 Basketball-Europameisterschaft 1977

Tournament details
- Host country: Belgium
- Cities: Ostend and Liège
- Dates: 14–24 September
- Teams: 12
- Venues: 2 (in 2 host cities)

Final positions
- Champions: Yugoslavia (3rd title)
- Runners-up: Soviet Union
- Third place: Czechoslovakia
- Fourth place: Italy

Tournament statistics
- MVP: (Socialist Federal Republic of Yugoslavia) Dražen Dalipagić
- Top scorer: (Netherlands) Kees Akerboom (26.4 points per game)

The 1977 FIBA European Championship, commonly called FIBA EuroBasket 1977, was the twentieth FIBA EuroBasket regional basketball championship, held by FIBA Europe.

== Venues ==
Ostend	Liège
Sportcentrum; Capacity 2 000	Country Hall du Sart Tilman; Capacity 5 000

== Group stage ==
=== Group A – Liège ===
Soviet Union	Austria	101–61
Bulgaria	Israel	88–86
Italy	France	70–59
Bulgaria	Soviet Union	96–117
France	Austria	86–81
Italy	Israel	78–73
France	Bulgaria	76–87
Italy	Austria	85–70
Israel	Soviet Union	69–103
Austria	Israel	87–103
Italy	Bulgaria	100–81
Soviet Union	France	115–74
Austria	Bulgaria	85–92
Israel	France	96–82
Italy	Soviet Union	95–87

Team	Pld	W	L	PF	PA	PD	Pts
Italy	5	5	0	428	370	+58	10
Soviet Union	5	4	1	523	395	+128	9
Bulgaria	5	3	2	444	464	−20	8
Israel	5	2	3	427	438	−11	7
France	5	1	4	377	449	−72	6
Austria	5	0	5	384	467	−83	5

=== Group B – Ostend ===
Netherlands	Czechoslovakia	73–90
Belgium	Finland	81–81 aet. 107–98
Spain	Yugoslavia	76–79
Finland	Yugoslavia	80–88
Netherlands	Spain	114–95
Belgium	Czechoslovakia	61–67
Finland	Netherlands	67–87
Czechoslovakia	Spain	73–70
Belgium	Yugoslavia	83–111
Czechoslovakia	Finland	100–85
Yugoslavia	Netherlands	111–75
Belgium	Spain	93–94
Spain	Finland	85–78
Yugoslavia	Czechoslovakia	103–111
Belgium	Netherlands	107–86

Team	Pld	W	L	PF	PA	PD	Pts
Czechoslovakia	5	5	0	441	392	+49	10
Yugoslavia	5	4	1	492	425	+67	9
Belgium	5	2	3	451	456	−5	7
Netherlands	5	2	3	435	470	−35	7
Spain	5	2	3	420	437	−17	7
Finland	5	0	5	408	467	−59	5

== Knockout stage ==
Semi-finals
Italy	69
Yugoslavia	88
Czechoslovakia	76
Soviet Union	91

Final
Yugoslavia	74
Soviet Union	61
Third place
Italy	81
Czechoslovakia	91

=== 5th to 8th place ===
Classification round
Bulgaria	108
Netherlands	85
Belgium	74
Israel	81

Fifth place
Bulgaria	78
Israel	88
Seventh place
Netherlands	104
Belgium	89

=== 9th to 12th place ===
Classification round
France	72
Finland	73
Spain	88
Austria	84

Ninth place
Finland	89
Spain	106
Eleventh place
France	89
Austria	71

1977 FIBA EuroBasket champions

Yugoslavia
3rd title

== Final standings ==
1. Yugoslavia
2. Soviet Union
3. Czechoslovakia
4. Italy
5. Israel
6. Bulgaria
7. Netherlands
8. Belgium
9. Spain
10. Finland
11. France
12. Austria

== Awards ==
1977 FIBA EuroBasket MVP: Dražen Dalipagić ( (Socialist Federal Republic of Yugoslavia) Yugoslavia)

All-Tournament Team
(Socialist Federal Republic of Yugoslavia) Zoran Slavnić
(Israel) Miki Berkovich
(Socialist Federal Republic of Yugoslavia) Dražen Dalipagić (MVP)
(Netherlands) Kees Akerboom
(Bulgaria) Atanas Golomeev

== Team rosters ==
1. Yugoslavia: Krešimir Ćosić, Dražen Dalipagić, Mirza Delibašić, Dragan Kićanović, Zoran Slavnić, Žarko Varajić, Željko Jerkov, Vinko Jelovac, Ratko Radovanović, Duje Krstulović, Ante Đogić, Joško Papič (Coach: Aleksandar Nikolić)

2. Soviet Union: Sergei Belov, Anatoly Myshkin, Vladimir Tkachenko, Aleksander Belostenny, Stanislav Eremin, Mikheil Korkia, Valeri Miloserdov, Vladimir Zhigili, Aleksander Salnikov, Viktor Petrakov, Vladimir Arzamaskov, Aleksander Kharchenkov (Coach: Alexander Gomelsky)

3. Czechoslovakia: Kamil Brabenec, Stanislav Kropilak, Zdenek Kos, Jiri Pospisil, Vojtech Petr, Jiri Konopasek, Vlastibor Klimeš, Zdenek Dousa, Gustav Hraska, Josef Necas, Vladimir Ptacek, Pavol Bojanovsky (Coach: Pavel Petera)

4. Italy: Dino Meneghin, Pierluigi Marzorati, Marco Bonamico, Renzo Bariviera, Carlo Caglieris, Lorenzo Carraro, Fabrizio della Fiori, Gianni Bertolotti, Giulio Iellini, Renzo Vecchiato, Vittorio Ferracini, Luigi Serafini (Coach: Giancarlo Primo)
