= EuroBasket 1981 =

International basketball event

Mistrovství Evropy v basketbalu mužů 1981 Majstrovstvá Európy v basketbale mužov 1981

Tournament details
- Host country: Czechoslovakia
- Dates: 26 May – 5 June
- Teams: 12
- Venues: 3 (in 3 host cities)

Final positions
- Champions: Soviet Union (13th title)
- Runners-up: Yugoslavia
- Third place: Czechoslovakia
- Fourth place: Spain

Tournament statistics
- MVP: (Soviet Union) Valdis Valters
- Top scorer: (Poland) Mieczysław Młynarski (22.9 points per game)

The 1981 FIBA European Championship, commonly called FIBA EuroBasket 1981, was the 22nd FIBA EuroBasket regional basketball championship, held by FIBA Europe. The competition was hosted by Czechoslovakia and took place from 26 May to 5 June 1981.

== Venues ==
Havířov	Bratislava	Prague
Ice Stadium Havířov; Capacity 7 000	Zimný štadión Capacity 10 000	Sportovní hala Capacity 15 000

== Participants ==
Twelve national teams took part in the competition, divided in 2 six-teams groups.

Group A	Group B
England; France; Greece; Israel; Spain; Czechoslovakia	West Germany; Italy; Yugoslavia; Poland; Soviet Union; Turkey

== First stage ==
The winner of each match earns two points, the loser one. The first three teams advance to the final stage, the last three team take part in the classification round.

=== Group A – Bratislava ===
Team	Pld	W	L	PF	PA	PD	Pts
Spain	5	5	0	452	362	+90	10
Czechoslovakia	5	4	1	393	358	+35	9
Israel	5	3	2	418	396	+22	8
France	5	2	3	402	409	−7	7
England	5	1	4	313	371	−58	6
Greece	5	0	5	356	438	−82	5

Israel	82 – 74	England
Greece	70 – 95	Czechoslovakia
Spain	102 – 93	France
Greece	81 – 86	France
Spain	89 – 81	Israel
Czechoslovakia	71 – 62	England
Greece	62 – 64	England
Czechoslovakia	69 – 72	Spain
France	76 – 88	Israel
England	47 – 78	Spain
France	69 – 72	Czechoslovakia
Greece	71 – 82	Israel
Israel	85 – 86	Czechoslovakia
Greece	72 – 111	Spain
England	66 – 78	France

=== Group B – Havířov ===
Team	Pld	W	L	PF	PA	PD	Pts
Soviet Union	5	5	0	489	377	+112	10
Yugoslavia	5	4	1	489	439	+50	9
Italy	5	3	2	418	407	+11	8
Poland	5	2	3	429	429	0	7
West Germany	5	1	4	334	395	−61	6
Turkey	5	0	5	346	458	−112	5

West Germany	66 – 51	Turkey
Soviet Union	101 – 89	Poland
Yugoslavia	99 – 88	Italy
Soviet Union	86 – 54	West Germany
Yugoslavia	92 – 89	Poland
Italy	94 – 73	Turkey
Yugoslavia	112 – 68	Turkey
Poland	81 – 71	West Germany
Italy	67 – 97	Soviet Union
Turkey	79 – 97	Soviet Union
Poland	81 – 90	Italy
Yugoslavia	98 – 86	West Germany
West Germany	57 – 79	Italy
Turkey	75 – 89	Poland
Yugoslavia	88 – 108	Soviet Union

=== Places 7–12 ===
Greece	Poland	78–89
England	West Germany	58–65
France	Turkey	67–60
Turkey	Greece	64–72
Poland	England	92–69
France	West Germany	83–70
West Germany	Greece	67–71
England	Turkey	60–63
France	Poland	93–102

Pos	Team	Pld	W	L	PF	PA	PD	Pts
7	Poland	5	5	0	453	386	+67	10
8	France	5	4	1	407	379	+28	9
9	Greece	5	2	3	364	370	−6	7
10	West Germany	5	2	3	339	344	−5	7
11	Turkey	5	1	4	313	354	−41	6
12	England	5	1	4	317	360	−43	6

=== Places 1–6 in Prague ===
Israel	Yugoslavia	87–102
Spain	Italy	87–86
Czechoslovakia	Soviet Union	84–110
Spain	Soviet Union	101–110
Israel	Italy	98–116
Yugoslavia	Czechoslovakia	95–86
Soviet Union	Israel	112–84
Italy	Czechoslovakia	83–100
Spain	Yugoslavia	72–95

Pos	Team	Pld	W	L	PF	PA	PD	Pts
1	Soviet Union	5	5	0	537	424	+113	10
2	Yugoslavia	5	4	1	479	441	+38	9
3	Spain	5	3	2	421	441	−20	8
4	Czechoslovakia	5	2	3	425	445	−20	7
5	Italy	5	1	4	440	481	−41	6
6	Israel	5	0	5	435	505	−70	5

=== Finals ===
Placement	Team 1	Team 2	Res.
3rd place	Spain	Czechoslovakia	90–101

=== Finals ===
Placement	Team 1	Team 2	Res.
1st place	Soviet Union	Yugoslavia	84–67

1981 FIBA EuroBasket champions

Soviet Union
13th title

== Final standings ==
1. Soviet Union
2. Yugoslavia
3. Czechoslovakia
4. Spain
5. Italy
6. Israel
7. Poland
8. France
9. Greece
10. West Germany
11. Turkey
12. England

== Awards ==
1981 FIBA EuroBasket MVP: Valdis Valters ( Soviet Union)

All-Tournament Team
(Soviet Union) Valdis Valters (MVP)
(Socialist Federal Republic of Yugoslavia) Dragan Kićanović
(Socialist Federal Republic of Yugoslavia) Dražen Dalipagić
(Soviet Union) Anatoly Myshkin
(Soviet Union) Vladimir Tkachenko

== Team rosters ==
1. Soviet Union: Valdis Valters, Anatoly Myshkin, Vladimir Tkachenko, Sergejus Jovaiša, Alexander Belostenny, Stanislav Yeryomin, Sergei Tarakanov, Andrey Lopatov, Nikolay Deryugin, Aleksandr Salnikov, Gennadi Kapustin, Nikolai Fesenko (Coach: Alexander Gomelsky)

2. Yugoslavia: Krešimir Ćosić, Dražen Dalipagić, Mirza Delibašić, Dragan Kićanović, Andro Knego, Peter Vilfan, Predrag Benaček, Ratko Radovanović, Boban Petrović, Branko Skroče, Željko Poljak, Petar Popović (Coach: Bogdan Tanjević)

3. Czechoslovakia: Kamil Brabenec, Stanislav Kropilák, Zdenek Kos, Vlastimil Klimes, Vojtech Petr, Vlastimil Havlik, Jaroslav Skala, Juraj Zuffa, Peter Rajniak, Zdenek Bohm, Justin Sedlak, Gustav Hraska (Coach: Pavel Petera)

4. Spain: Juan Antonio Corbalán, Juan Antonio San Epifanio, Wayne Brabender, Fernando Martín, Candido "Chicho" Sibilio, Manuel Flores, Ignacio "Nacho" Solozábal, Rafael Rullán, Juan Domingo de la Cruz, Quim Costa, Josep Maria Margall, Fernando Romay (Coach: Antonio Díaz-Miguel)
