= Jiří Růžička (basketball) =

Czech basketball player

Personal information
- Born: 4 June 1941 (age 85)
- Listed height: 6 ft 1.25 in (1.86 m)
- Listed weight: 185 lb (84 kg)

Career information
- Playing career: 1960–1975
- Coaching career: 1987–2006

Career history

Playing
- 1960–1961: Spartak ZJŠ Brno
- 1961–1965: Slavia VŠ Praha
- 1965–1966: Dukla Olomouc
- 1966–1975: Slavia VŠ Praha

Coaching
- 1987–1988: Stavební Fakulta Praha
- 1989–1991: Sparta Praha
- 1998–2000: Mlékárna Kunín
- 2003: ČEZ Nymburk
- 2003–2006: Czechoslovakia Women Under-20

Career highlights
- As player: FIBA European Selection Team (1967); FIBA Saporta Cup champion (1969); 6× Czechoslovak League champion (1965, 1969–1972, 1974); 6× Czechoslovak League All-Star Five (1965–1968, 1970, 1972); Czechoslovak 20th Century Team (2001); As head coach: Czech League champion (1999)
Medals
Representing Czechoslovakia
Men's basketball
EuroBasket
| Silver medal – second place | 1967 Finland |
| Bronze medal – third place | 1969 Italy |

Jiří Růžička (born 4 June 1941) is a Czech former basketball player. He was voted to the Czechoslovak 20th Century Team in 2001.

== Playing career ==
=== Club career ===
During his club career, Růžička won six Czechoslovak League championships (1965, 1969, 1970, 1971, 1972, and 1974). He also won the European-wide secondary level FIBA Saporta Cup championship, in the 1968–69 season. He was named to the FIBA European Selection Team in 1967.

=== National team career ===
With the senior Czechoslovak national team, Růžička competed in the men's tournament at the 1972 Summer Olympics. With Czechoslovakia, he also won the silver medal at the 1967 EuroBasket, and the bronze medal at the 1969 EuroBasket.

== Coaching career ==
After his playing career, Růžička worked as a basketball coach. He won the Czech League championship in 1999, with Mlékárna Kunín.

== See also ==
- Czechoslovak Basketball League career stats leaders
