= Basket Brno =

PUMPA Basket Brno
- Leagues: NBL
- Founded: 1926; 100 years ago
- History: List: Sokol Brno I (1926–1945) Spartak ZJŠ Brno (1945–1976) Spartak-Zbrojovka Brno (1976–1977) Zbrojovka Brno (1977–1991) BVC Bioveta Ivanovice na Hané (1991–1992) BC Brno (1992–present)
- Arena: STAREZ ARÉNA Vododa
- Capacity: 2,900
- Location: Brno, Czech Republic
- Championships: 21 Czechoslovak Championships; 3 Czech Championships
- Website: www.basketbrno.cz
Home	Away

Basketball Club Brno (Czech: Basketbalový Klub Brno), for sponsorship reasons PUMPA BASKET Brno, is a Czech professional basketball club based in the city of Brno. The team plays in the Czech National Basketball League – the highest competition in the Czech Republic.

Home games of Brno are played in the STAREZ ARÉNA Vododa, which has a capacity of 2,900 people.

The club owned by True Player Group with the idea to "unite the city top two youth clubs to one elite club and push the players to professional level, providing the best coaches, mentoring, nutrition programs, strength programing, rehab, etc."

== History ==
The team was a European powerhouse from 1945 through the 1960s and mid-1970s. Brno was the most successful basketball club in Czechoslovakia, winning 21 championship titles through the 1970s, and another three titles from 1994 to 1996. Brno lost two FIBA European Champion Cup finals in 1964 and 1968, both times to Spanish champions Real Madrid. The 1974 loss in the FIBA European Cup Winners' Cup final to Crvena zvezda marked the end of a golden era for the club in European competitions.

On January 25 and 26, 1969 Spartak ZJŠ Brno participated in the FIBA Intercontinental Cup at Macon, Georgia, the second time a basketball club from Czechoslovakia participated in the competition after Slavia VŠ Praha had done so in 1967. In the 1969 semifinal, Spartak beat European champions, Real Madrid but lost the final 71–84 to the Akron Goodyear Wingfoots, a basketball team of workers at the Goodyear Tire Company in Akron, Ohio.

Since 2022 Brno team participates also in the newly founded international league European North Basketball League. In the debut season Brno won 4 games out of 5 in the regular season, finishing second in the standings. Later in the Final Four Brno lost to Šiauliai team from Lithuania and won the bronze medal.

== Current roster ==
Note: Flags indicate national team eligibility at FIBA-sanctioned events. Players may hold other non-FIBA nationalities not displayed.

BC Brno roster
Players
Coaches

Pos.	No.	Nat.	Name
SF	4	(Czech Republic)	Rychtecký, Matěj	1.95 m (6 ft 5 in)	21 – 8 March 2004
PF	7	(Czech Republic)	Stráněl, Milan	2.01 m (6 ft 7 in)	20 – 17 October 2005
G	8	(Czech Republic)	Farský, Radek	1.94 m (6 ft 4 in)	26 – 11 April 1999
SF	10	(Czech Republic)	Musil, Jonáš	1.95 m (6 ft 5 in)	23 – 25 November 2002
PF	11	(Czech Republic)	Svoboda, Šimon	2.05 m (6 ft 9 in)	21 – 15 April 2004
PG	12	(Czech Republic)	Křivánek, Petr	2.00 m (6 ft 7 in)	22 – 18 May 2003
C	13	(Czech Republic)	Kejval, Adam	2.10 m (6 ft 11 in)	24 – 21 January 2002
PG	14	(Czech Republic)	Houzar, Tomáš	1.89 m (6 ft 2 in)	23 – 30 September 2002
SG	18	(Czech Republic)	Půlpán, Viktor (C)	1.96 m (6 ft 5 in)	29 – 17 August 1996
G	19	(Czech Republic)	Jansa, Tomáš	1.88 m (6 ft 2 in)	24 – 17 January 2002
C	20	(United States)	Groves, Jacob	2.06 m (6 ft 9 in)	24 – 5 April 2001
PF	22	(Czech Republic)	Šimko, Maroš	2.05 m (6 ft 9 in)	20 – 21 June 2005
PG	33	(United States)	Williams, Ross	1.78 m (5 ft 10 in)	25 – 17 July 2000
PF	34	(United States)	Kalu, Kevin	2.06 m (6 ft 9 in)	22 – 21 May 2003
SF	44	(Czech Republic)	Ivánek, Viktor	1.95 m (6 ft 5 in)	19 – 19 June 2006

Head coach

- (Czech Republic) Martin Vaněk

Assistant coach(es)

- (Czech Republic) Patrik Sarna
- (Czech Republic) Richard Kucsa

Legend

- (C) Team captain
- Injured

- Roster
Updated: January 31, 2023

== Sponsorship names ==
Logo used from 2013 to 2018

Partly due to sponsorship reasons, the club has known several names:

- Sokol Brno I (1926–1945)
- BC Spartak ZJŠ Brno (1945–1976)
- Spartak-Zbrojovka Brno (1976–1977)
- Zbrojovka Brno (1977–1991)
- BVC Bioveta Ivanovice na Hane (1991–1992)
- Bioveta COOP Banka Brno (1992–1995)
- Stavex Brno (1995–1998)
- Draci Brno (1998–1999)
- BC BVV ŽS Brno (1999–2003)
- A plus ŽS Brno BC (2003–2008)
- BC Brno (2009–2013)
- mmcité Brno (2013–2018)
- egoé Brno (2018–2020)
- Brno Next Generation (2020–2022)
- Basket Brno (2022–2025)
- PUMPA BASKET Brno (2025–present)

== Honours ==
Total titles: 24

=== Domestic ===
Czechoslovak League

- Winners (21): 1945–46, 1947, 1947–48, 1948*, 1948–49, 1949–50, 1950–51, 1951*, 1957–58, 1961–62, 1962–63, 1963–64, 1966–67, 1967–68, 1975–76, 1976–77, 1977–78, 1985–86, 1986–87, 1987–88, 1989–90

Czech League

- Winners (3): 1993–94, 1994–95, 1995–96

=== European ===
EuroLeague

- Runners-up (2): 1963–64, 1967–68

FIBA Saporta Cup

- Runners-up (1): 1973–74

=== Worldwide ===
FIBA Intercontinental Cup

- Runners-up (1): 1969

== International record ==
Season	Achievement	Notes
EuroLeague
1962–63	Semi-finals	eliminated by Real Madrid, 79–60 (W) in Brno and 67–90 (L) in Madrid
1963–64	Final	lost to Real Madrid, 110–99 (W) in Brno and 64–84 (L) in Madrid in the double finals of European Champions Cup
1964–65	Quarter-finals	eliminated by Ignis Varese, 84–90 (L) in Varese and 72–67 (W) in Brno
1967–68	Final	lost to Real Madrid, 95–98 in the final (Lyon)
1968–69	Semi-finals	eliminated by CSKA Moscow, 66–101 (L) in Moscow and 92–83 (W) in Brno
1976–77	Semi-final group stage	6th place in group with Mobilgirgi Varese, Maccabi Tel Aviv, CSKA Moscow, Real Madrid & Maes Pils
FIBA Saporta Cup
1966–67	Semi-finals	eliminated by Ignis Varese, 83–84 (L) in Brno and 53–58 (L) in Varese
1972–73	Quarter-finals	3rd place in a group with Spartak Leningrad and Mobilquattro Milano
1973–74	Final	lost to Crvena zvezda, 75–86 in the final (Udine)
FIBA Intercontinental Cup
1969	Final	lost to Akron Goodyear Wingfoots, 71–84 in the final (Macon)

== The road to the great European journeys ==
1963–64 FIBA European Champions Cup

Round	Team	Home	Away
1st round	(Austria) Handelsministerium	79–62	105–71
2nd round	(Israel) Maccabi Tel Aviv	96–51	58–60
Quarter-finals	(Romania) Steaua București	104–75	92–94
Semi-finals	(Socialist Federal Republic of Yugoslavia) OKK Beograd	85–75	94–103
Final	(Spain) Real Madrid	110–99	64–84

1967–68 FIBA European Champions Cup

Round	Team	Home	Away
2nd round	(Turkey) Altınordu	102–69	65–61
Quarter-finals	(Spain) Real Madrid	113–97	78–85
Quarter-finals	(Belgium) Racing Bell Mechelen	76–67	79–80
Quarter-finals	(Israel) Maccabi Tel Aviv	105–76	88–77
Semi-finals	(Italy) Simmenthal Milano	103–86	63–64
Final	(Spain) Real Madrid	95–98	

1973–74 FIBA European Cup Winners' Cup

Round	Team	Home	Away
1st round	(England) Embassy All Stars	123–76	103–84
2nd round	(Belgium) Royal IV	114–83	96–94
Quarter-finals	(Romania) Steaua București	96–86	64–77
Quarter-finals	(Spain) Estudiantes Monteverde	117–93	72–74
Semi-finals	(Italy) Saclà Asti	88–71	70–86
Final	(Socialist Federal Republic of Yugoslavia) Crvena zvezda	75–86	

== Notable players ==
Note: Flags indicate national team eligibility at FIBA-sanctioned events. Players may hold other non-FIBA nationalities not displayed.

Criteria

To appear in this section a player must have either:

- Set a club record or won an individual award while at the club
- Played at least one official international match for their national team at any time
- Played at least one official NBA match at any time.

- (Czechoslovakia) Jan Bobrovský (1963–1972 & 1973–1978)
- (Czechoslovakia) Zdeněk Bobrovský (1950–1951 & 1954–1968)
- (Czechoslovakia) Kamil Brabenec (1972–1982 & 1983–1988)
- (Czechoslovakia) Vlastimil Havlík (1975–1983 & 1984–1988)
- (Czechoslovakia) Zdeněk Konečný (1955–1967)
- (Czechoslovakia) František Konvička (1957–1969 & 1971–1973)
- (Czechoslovakia) Leoš Krejčí (1983–1988, 1989–1990 & 1994–1998)
- (Czechoslovakia) Robert Mifka (1966–1968)
- (Czechoslovakia) Petr Novický (1966–1974)
- (Czechoslovakia) Jiří Okáč (1980–1984, 1986–1990 & 2003–2004)
- (Czechoslovakia) Vojtěch Petr (1972–1980)
- (Czechoslovakia) Vladimír Pištělák (1958–1969 & 1971–1973)
- (Czechoslovakia) Jiří "Áda" Pospíšil (1968–1974)
- (Czechoslovakia) Jaroslav Tetiva (1951–1953)
- (Finland) Aapeli Alanen (2021)
