= Vlastibor Klimeš =

Czech basketball player (born 1953)

Personal information
- Born: 17 August 1953 (age 73) Prague, Czechoslovakia
- Listed height: 6 ft 5.5 in (1.97 m)

Career history

Playing
- 1970–1978: Slavia VŠ Praha
- 1979–1986: Dukla Olomouc

Coaching
- 1996–1997: BG 74 Göttingen (assistant)
- 1997–2003: BG 74 Göttingen
- 2003–2005: Wolfenbüttel Dukes
- 2005–2006: BG 74 Göttingen (women's assistant)
- 2006–2009: BG 74 Göttingen (women's)
- 2010–2013: Wolfenbüttel Wildcats (women's)

Career highlights
- Czechoslovak League All-Star Five (1982)
Medals
Men's basketball
Representing Czechoslovakia
FIBA Eurobasket
Bronze medal – third place	1977 Belgium	Czechoslovakia
Bronze medal – third place	1981 Czechoslovakia	Czechoslovakia
Czechoslovak Basketball League
Gold medal – first place	1974, 1981, 1982	3x
Silver medal – second place	1973, 1976, 1977	3x
Bronze medal – third place	1975, 1978, 1979	3x

Vlastibor Klimeš (born 17 August 1953) is a Czech basketball coach and former player. As a national player, his homeland team won two bronze medals at the European Basketball Championships and he competed in the men's tournament at the 1980 Summer Olympics. As a basketball coach, he was successful in winning the 2012 German championship with the Wolfenbüttel Wildcats women's team.

== Playing career ==
Born in Prague, Vlastibor Klimeš is officially recognised as a Czech National Honorary Master of Sports. In the Czechoslovak Basketball League, he won the title of Czechoslovak champion three times with Slavia VŠ Praha (1974, 1981, 1982), finishing as vice-champions three times (1973, 1976, 1977), as well as two third place (1975, 1978) and one fourth-place finish (1980). He finished in third place once more in 1979 with Dukla Olomouc. In the 1981–1982 season, he was named one of the Czechoslovak League All-Star Five. He is in 33rd place on the all-time leading scorers list of the 1st basketball league in Czechoslovakia (from the 1962–63 to 1992–93 season) with 4573 points.

He participated in a total of 8 European club basketball cups, with Slavia USK Prague, he reached the quarter-finals on three occasions (1973, 1975, 1982), three times the FIBA Cup Winners' Cup (from 1976 to 1978), reaching the quarter-finals in the 1977 edition and the FIBA Korać Cup in 1981. With Dukla Olomouc he played in the Cup Winners' Cup in 1979.

== National team career ==
As a member of the Czechoslovakia men's national basketball team, he participated in eight world and eight European basketball championships. He participated in the 1980 Summer Olympics in Moscow (Czechoslovakia finished ninth), when he had previously finished second in qualifying in Geneva before the 1980 Olympics and thus won participation in the Olympic Games. He competed in two world championships in 1978 in the Philippines (9th place) and 1982 in Colombia (10th place).

He participated in four European Men's Championships - 1975 in Belgrade, Yugoslavia, 1977 in Belgium, 1979 in Turin, Italy and 1981 in Prague. With the Czechoslovak basketball team, he won two bronze medals at the European Championships, as well as one fourth and sixth place.

He played 234 matches for the Czechoslovak national team in 1972–1982, of which a total of 53 matches at the Olympic Games, World Championships and European Championships, in which he scored 328 points. In 1977, at the World Universiade in Sofia, he finished third with the Czechoslovak team.

== Awards and honors ==
Player

CSBL

- Three-time Czechoslovak Basketball League champion – 1974, 1981, 1982
- Three-time Runner-up – 1973, 1976, 1977
- Three-time third place – 1975, 1978, 1979

Czechoslovakia

- 1977, 1981

Other

- Czechoslovak League All-Star Five (1982)

Coach

Damen-Basketball-Bundesliga

- Damen-Basketball-Bundesliga champions – 2012

== Coaching career ==
At the end of his career, he left to play and train in Finland and Germany. He later settled in the Federal Republic of Germany and, after his playing career, worked as a coach for basketball teams. Among other things, he coached the BG 74 team in Göttingen in the second division until 2003, where he worked as a caretaker and hall manager at the Felix-Klein-Gymnasium. He then moved to league rivals Wolfenbüttel Dukes. After two years he moved back to Göttingen, where he was this time assistant coach of the club's women's team in the first women's basketball league. He replaced head coach Mahmut Ataman from his post in the 2006/07 season and coached the team until the end of the 2008/09 season. After financial problems that had arisen a year earlier, the club's license was revoked at the end of the season. After a year, Klimeš returned to Wolfenbüttel, where he became the coach of the Wildcats women's premier league team. However, like the Dukes men's team and the women's team of BG 74 Göttingen, this club was also illiquid a year later, and the license could be transferred to the new club BV Wolfenbüttel. At the end of the following season 2011/12 Klimeš was with the team, which continued to compete under the name Wildcats, German champions. But just one year later, only the main round of the 2012/13 season was played before the license was finally returned after renewed illiquidity.

== Personal life ==
His wife Dana Klimešová-Ptáčková was also a basketball player of Sparta Prague (1972–1982. winning 8 national titles, and two 2nd-place finishes). She also played for the national team of Czechoslovakia, with which she participated in the 1976 Summer Olympics in Montreal, finishing in 4th place, and the 1975 World Championships in Colombia, finishing in 3rd place, and the European Junior Championships 1971 coming in 2nd place, while winning six Women's European Championships in 1972–1981 (2x European vice-champion, 3x 3rd and 1x 4th place).

Klimeš and his wife Dana also have children who are successful in basketball. While her daughter Zuzana Klimešová (* 1979) was also an Olympic participant for the Czech Republic at the 2004 Olympic Games and played in the US professional league WNBA, her son Martin is active for Klimeš's former team in Prague, which now plays under the name USK Praha.

== See also ==
- Czechoslovak Basketball League career stats leaders
