= Kamil Brabenec =

Kamil Brabenec may refer to:

- Kamil Brabenec (basketball) (born 1951), Czech basketball player
- Kamil Brabenec (ice hockey) (born 1976), Czech ice hockey player
