= Štefan Svitek (basketball) =

Personal information
- Born: 20 November 1966 (age 59) Gelnica, Czechoslovakia
- Listed height: 6 ft 8.5 in (2.04 m)
- Listed weight: 240 lb (109 kg)

Career information
- Playing career: 1986–2007
- Position: Power forward
- Coaching career: 2007–present

Career history

Playing
- 1986–1987: Chemosvit
- 1987–1989: Slavia VŠT Košice
- 1989–1990: RH Pardubice
- 1990–1991: Brno
- 1991–1993: Braunschweig
- 1993–1996: SSV Brandt Hagen
- 1996–1998: TTL uniVersa Bamberg
- 1998–2000: SSV Ratiopharm Ulm
- 2000: DJK Falke Nürnberg
- 2001: Traiskirchen Lions
- 2001–2003: ESO Lučenec
- 2003–2007: Slavia TU Košice

Coaching
- 2007–2012: Good Angels Košice
- 2012: Hungary Women
- 2012–2013: Ružomberok Women
- 2013–2015: Wisła Can-Pack Kraków Women
- 2015–2017: Hungary Women
- 2015–2016: Slávie TU Kosice
- 2016: CCC Polkowice Women
- 2017–present: Czech Republic Women
- 2017–2018: Aluinvent DVTK Miskolc Women
- 2018–2019: Energa Toruń Women
- 2019–present: Wisła Can-Pack Kraków Women

Career highlights
- As player: German Cup winner (1994); Austrian Cup winner (2001); 2× Czechoslovak League All-Star Five (1988, 1989); Slovak League champion (2007); Slovak Player of the Year (2003); As head coach: 2× Polish Women's League champion (2014, 2015); 2× Polish Women's Cup winner (2014, 2015); 4× Slovak Women's League champion (2008–2011); 5× Slovak Women's Cup winner (2008–2012); 2× Slovak Women's League Coach of the Year (2012, 2013)

Štefan Svitek (born 20 November 1966) is a Slovak former professional basketball player and coach. During his playing career, at a height of 2.04 m (6'8 1/2") tall, he played at the power forward position.

== Playing career ==
=== Club career ===
During his pro career, Svitek won the German Cup in 1994, the Austrian Cup in 2001, and the Slovak League championship in 2007. He was also named the Slovak Player of the Year, in 2003.

=== National team career ===
Svitek was a member of the senior Czechoslovakia national basketball team. With Czechoslovakia, he played at the 1987 EuroBasket, and at the 1991 EuroBasket.

== Coaching career ==
Svitek was the head coach of the senior Hungarian women's national team, which he coached at the EuroBasket Women 2017.
