= Jiří Zídek Sr. =

Czech basketball player and coach (1944–2022)

Jiří Zídek
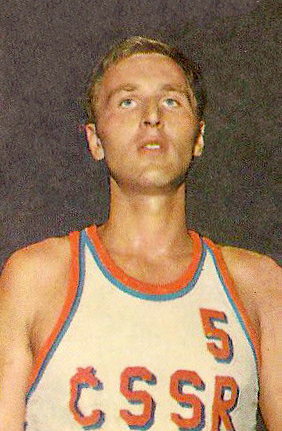
- Zídek with the Czechoslovak national team in 1970

Personal information
- Born: 8 February 1944 Prague, Bohemia and Moravia, Germany
- Died: 21 May 2022 (aged 78)
- Listed height: 6 ft 9 in (2.06 m)
- Listed weight: 220 lb (100 kg)

Career information
- Playing career: 1962–1979
- Position: Center
- Number: 5
- Coaching career: 1985–2004

Career history

Playing
- 1962–1969: Slavia VŠ Praha
- 1969–1970: Dukla Olomouc
- 1970–1977: Slavia VŠ Praha
- 1977–1979: Slavia VŠT Košice

Coaching
- 1985–1990: Slavia VŠ Praha
- 1992–1993: Sparta Praha
- 2003–2004: Sparta Praha

Career highlights
- As player: 2× FIBA European Selection (1966, 1967); FIBA Saporta Cup champion (1969); FIBA Saporta Cup Finals Top Scorer (1968); 6× Czechoslovakia League champion (1965, 1966, 1969, 1971, 1972, 1974); 2× Czechoslovak Player of the Year (1970, 1972); 10× Czechoslovak League All-Star Five (1965–1974); Czechoslovak League all-time leading scorer; Best Czechoslovak Player of 20th Century (2001)
- FIBA Hall of Fame
Medals
Men's basketball
Representing Czechoslovakia
FIBA EuroBasket
Silver medal – second place	1967 Finland
Bronze medal – third place	1969 Italy

Jiří Zídek Sr. (8 February 1944 – 21 May 2022) was a Czech professional basketball player and coach. At 2.06 metres (6 ft 9 in) tall, Zídek was a talented center who was named the Best Czech Player of the 20th Century, and was the Czechoslovak League's all-time leading scorer. He was also among the 105 nominees to the 50 Greatest EuroLeague Contributors list. His son, Jiří "George" Zídek Jr., also won the EuroLeague title with Žalgiris, in 1999. To this day, they are the only father and son to have reached a EuroLeague title game as players. In 2019, he became the first Czech to be inducted into the FIBA Hall of Fame.

== Club career ==
Zídek helped Slavia Prague make it all the way to the EuroLeague's Final in the 1965–66 season. He scored 22 points in the final, to lead all scorers, but Simmenthal Milano stood in his way for the EuroLeague crown, winning the game by a score of 77–72. Zídek also helped Slavia reach the 1966–67 EuroLeague semifinals, and win the 1968–69 Final of the European-wide secondary level FIBA European Cup Winners' Cup (FIBA Saporta Cup). He also starred for Slavia in front of 80,000 fans, in Athens, at the 1967–68 FIBA Saporta Cup Final, against AEK Athens – which was one of the biggest crowds in basketball history.

== National team career ==
Zídek helped to lead the senior men's Czechoslovak national team to a silver medal at the 1967 EuroBasket, where he was voted to the All-Tournament Team. He averaged 13.8 points per game in the tournament. His best game of that tournament was the final, which was lost against the Soviet Union national team, by a score of 89–77, in which he scored 23 points. He was also the leader of the Czechoslovak national team, when they won the bronze medal at the 1969 EuroBasket, where he averaged 12.6 points per game.

He also competed in the men's tournament at the 1972 Summer Olympics.

== Coaching career ==
After his playing career, Zídek worked as a basketball coach.

== Personal life ==
His son George Zidek and grandson Jan Žídek also played or play basketball professionally.

== See also ==
- Czechoslovak Basketball League career stats leaders
