= EuroBasket 1985 =

International basketball event

Basketball-Europameisterschaft 1985

Tournament details
- Host country: West Germany
- Dates: 5–16 June
- Teams: 12
- Venues: 3 (in 3 host cities)

Final positions
- Champions: Soviet Union (14th title)
- Runners-up: Czechoslovakia
- Third place: Italy
- Fourth place: Spain

Tournament statistics
- Games played: 46
- MVP: (Soviet Union) Arvydas Sabonis
- Top scorer: (Israel) Doron Jamchy (28.1 points per game)

The 1985 FIBA European Championship, commonly called FIBA EuroBasket 1985, was the 24th FIBA EuroBasket regional basketball championship, held by FIBA Europe. It took place from 5 to 16 June 1985 in West Germany. The Soviet Union defeated Czechoslovakia in the final to win their fourteenth and final title.

== Venues ==
Location	Picture	City	Arena	Capacity	Status	Round
EuroBasket 1985 is located in FRG and West Berlin		Karlsruhe	Europahalle	5,000	1983	Group A
EuroBasket 1985 is located in FRG and West Berlin		Leverkusen	Wilhelm Dopatka Halle	3,500	Opened in 1974	Group B
EuroBasket 1985 is located in FRG and West Berlin		Stuttgart	Schleyerhalle	15,500	Opened in 1983	Knockout rounds and qualification rounds

== Qualification ==
A total of twelve teams qualified for the tournament. To the top eight teams from the previous tournament, four more teams were granted berths via a qualifying tournament.

- Top eight teams from Eurobasket 1983:
  - France
  - Israel
  - Italy
  - Netherlands
  - Soviet Union
  - Spain
  - West Germany
  - Yugoslavia
- Top four teams from the qualifying stage:
  - Bulgaria
  - Czechoslovakia
  - Romania
  - Poland

== Format ==
- The teams were split in two groups of six teams each. The top four teams from each group advance to the quarterfinals. The winners in the knockout semifinals advance to the Final, and the losers figure in a third-place playoff.
- The losers from the quarterfinals stage compete in a separate bracket to define places 5th through 8th in the final standings.
- The fifth and sixth teams from each group competed in another bracket to define places 9th through 12th in the final standings.

== Preliminary round ==
Qualified for the quarter-finals

=== Group A ===
Times given below are in Central European Time (UTC+1).

Team	Pld	W	L	PF	PA	PD	Pts
Yugoslavia	5	4	1	514	464	+50	9
Soviet Union	5	4	1	537	483	+54	9
Spain	5	4	1	496	465	+31	9
France	5	1	4	479	531	−52	6
Romania	5	1	4	452	488	−36	6
Poland	5	1	4	457	504	−47	6

5 June
15:00

Boxscore

Poland	70–83	Romania
Scoring by half: 34–42, 36–41
Pts: Fikiel 16		Pts: Dan Niculescu 21

Europahalle, Karlsruhe
Attendance: 2,500
Referees: John Weiland (CAN), Todd Warnick (ISR)

5 June
19:00

Boxscore

Soviet Union	118–103	France
Scoring by half: 65–46, 53–57
Pts: Chomičius 23		Pts: Szanyiel 26

Europahalle, Karlsruhe
Attendance: 2,940
Referees: Peter George (FRG), Maurizio Martolini (ITA)

5 June
21:00

Boxscore

Spain	83–99	Yugoslavia
Scoring by half: 44–39, 39–60
Pts: Martín 19		Pts: D. Petrović 23

Europahalle, Karlsruhe
Attendance: 3,708
Referees: Costas Rigas (GRE), Lubomir Kotleba

6 June
15:00

Boxscore

Soviet Union	100–85	Romania
Scoring by half: 43–37, 57–48
Pts: Kurtinaitis 22		Pts: Da Niculescu 20

Europahalle, Karlsruhe
Attendance: 1,000
Referees: Maurizio Martolini (ITA), Jan Van Renen (NED)

6 June
18:00

Boxscore

Spain	99–97	Poland
Scoring by half: 52–58, 47–39
Pts: San Epifanio 25		Pts: Zelig 25

Europahalle, Karlsruhe
Attendance: 1,500
Referees: Peter George (FRG), Georgy Labov (BUL)

6 June
20:00

Boxscore

France	89–110	Yugoslavia
Scoring by half: 40–65, 49–45
Pts: Ostrowski 22		Pts: D. Petrović 30

Europahalle, Karlsruhe
Attendance: 3,500
Referees: John Weiland (CAN), Todd Warnick (ISR)

7 June
15:00

Boxscore

Romania	94–106	Spain
Scoring by half: 49–51, 45–55
Pts: Cernat 22		Pts: San Epifanio 22

Europahalle, Karlsruhe
Attendance: 4,000
Referees: Maurizio Martolini (ITA), Jan Van Renen (NED)

7 June
18:00

Boxscore

France	94–97	Poland
Scoring by half: 34–46, 60–51
Pts: Dubuisson 39		Pts: Zelig 36

Europahalle, Karlsruhe
Attendance: 3,000
Referees: John Weiland (CAN), Todd Warnick (ISR)

7 June
20:00

Boxscore

Soviet Union	105–97	Yugoslavia
Scoring by half: 57–53, 48–44
Pts: Sabonis 34		Pts: D. Petrović 30

Europahalle, Karlsruhe
Attendance: 4,520
Referees: Costas Rigas (GRE), Lubomir Kotleba

8 June
15:00

Boxscore

France	110–97	Romania
Scoring by half: 55–59, 55–38
Pts: Szanyiel 25		Pts: Opsitaru 21

Europahalle, Karlsruhe
Attendance: 2,040
Referees: Peter George (FRG), Costas Rigas (GRE)

8 June
18:00

Boxscore

Yugoslavia	106–94	Poland
Scoring by half: 51–44, 55–50
Pts: D. Petrović 31		Pts: Zelig 23

Europahalle, Karlsruhe
Attendance: 2,200
Referees: Lubomir Kotleba, Jan Van Renen (NED)

8 June
20:00

Boxscore

Soviet Union	92–99	Spain
Scoring by half: 52–57, 40–42
Pts: Sabonis 28		Pts: Sibilio 17

Europahalle, Karlsruhe
Attendance: 4,230
Referees: John Weiland (CAN), Maurizio Martolini (ITA)

9 June
15:00

Boxscore

Yugoslavia	102–93	Romania
Scoring by half: 62–49, 40–44
Pts: D. Petrović 23		Pts: Ermurache 23

Europahalle, Karlsruhe
Attendance: 3,040
Referees: John Weiland (CAN), Georgy Labov (BUL)

9 June
18:00

Boxscore

Spain	109–83	France
Scoring by half: 62–34, 47–49
Pts: Margall 21		Pts: Cham 14

Europahalle, Karlsruhe
Attendance: 3,732
Referees: Lubomir Kotleba, Jan Van Renen (NED)

9 June
20:00

Boxscore

Soviet Union	122–99	Poland
Scoring by half: 64–44, 58–55
Pts: Enden, Valters 17		Pts: Binkowski 26

Europahalle, Karlsruhe
Attendance: 3,200
Referees: Costas Rigas (GRE), Peter George (FRG)

=== Group B ===
Team	Pld	W	L	PF	PA	PD	Pts
Italy	5	4	1	459	391	+68	9
West Germany	5	3	2	445	420	+25	8
Bulgaria	5	3	2	396	385	+11	8
Czechoslovakia	5	2	3	428	425	+3	7
Israel	5	2	3	430	434	−4	7
Netherlands	5	1	4	397	503	−106	6

5 June
14:00

Boxscore

Italy	82–80	Czechoslovakia
Scoring by half: 39–42, 43–38
Pts: Villalta 21		Pts: Brabenec 16

Wilhelm Dopatka Halle, Leverkusen
Attendance: 2,050
Referees: Alan Richardson (ENG), Francisco Fajardo (ESP)

5 June
18:00

Boxscore

West Germany	104–79	Netherlands
Scoring by half: 51–34, 53–45
Pts: Jackel 36		Pts: Kuipers 21

Wilhelm-Dopatka Halle, Leverkusen
Attendance: 3,110
Referees: Georgy Avalishvili (URS), Zoran Grbac (YUG)

5 June
20:30

Boxscore

Israel	72–78	Bulgaria
Scoring by half: 44–37, 28–41
Pts: Jamchi 27		Pts: Evtimov 26

Wilhelm-Dopatka Halle, Leverkusen
Attendance: 3,100
Referees: José Manuel Reynoso (USA), Yvan Mainini (FRA)

6 June
15:30

Boxscore

Italy	94–79	West Germany
Scoring by half: 49–43, 45–36
Pts: Gilardi 22		Pts: Schrempf 26

Wilhelm-Dopatka Halle, Leverkusen
Attendance: 4,260
Referees: José Manuel Reynoso (USA), Yvan Mainini (FRA)

6 June
18:15

Boxscore

Israel	92–93	Czechoslovakia
Scoring by half: 54–42, 38–51
Pts: Jamchi 33		Pts: Kropilák 23

Wilhelm-Dopatka Halle, Leverkusen
Attendance: 3,600
Referees: Zoran Grbac (YUG), Ion Antonescu (ROU)

6 June
20:30

Boxscore

Netherlands	90–103	Bulgaria
Scoring by half: 32–52, 58–51
Pts: Esveldt 21		Pts: Antov 23

Wilhelm-Dopatka Halle, Leverkusen
Attendance: 4,100
Referees: Alan Richardson (ENG), Wieslaw Zych (POL)

7 June
15:00

Boxscore

West Germany	101–83	Czechoslovakia
Scoring by half: 45–44, 56–39
Pts: Schrempf 31		Pts: Brabenec 17

Wilhelm-Dopatka Halle, Leverkusen
Attendance: 2,640
Referees: Alan Richardson (ENG), Wieslaw Zych (POL)

7 June
18:00

Boxscore

Italy	82–61	Bulgaria
Scoring by half: 41–29, 41–32
Pts: Savio 16		Pts: Gluškov 17

Wilhelm-Dopatka Halle, Leverkusen
Attendance: 2,050
Referees: Georgy Avalishvili (URS), Francisco Fajardo (ESP)

7 June
20:30

Boxscore

Israel	80–86	Netherlands
Scoring by half: 49–45, 31–41
Pts: Jamchi 19		Pts: Kuipers 22

Wilhelm-Dopatka Halle, Leverkusen
Attendance: 2,460
Referees: Yvan Mainin (FRA), Zoran Grbac (YUG)

8 June
15:30

Boxscore

Czechoslovakia	68–84	Bulgaria
Scoring by half: 35–40, 33–44
Pts: Havlík 15		Pts: Mladenov 26

Wilhelm-Dopatka Halle, Leverkusen
Attendance: 3,800
Referees: José Manuel Reynoso (USA), Ion Antonescu (ROU)

8 June
18:15

Boxscore

Israel	94–88	West Germany
Scoring by half: 46–52, 48–36
Pts: Jamchi 42		Pts: Schrempf 36

Wilhelm-Dopatka Halle, Leverkusen
Attendance: 4,002
Referees: Georgy Avalishvili (URS), Francisco Fajardo (ESP)

8 June
20:30

Boxscore

Netherlands	76–112	Italy
Scoring by half: 32–56, 44–56
Pts: de Waard, van Noord 15		Pts: Magnifico 23

Wilhelm-Dopatka Halle, Leverkusen
Attendance: 3,950
Referees: Alan Richardson (ENG), Wieslaw Zych (POL)

9 June
14:30

Boxscore

Netherlands	66–104	Czechoslovakia
Scoring by half: 29–57, 37–47
Pts: de Waard 14		Pts: Brabenec 30

Wilhelm-Dopatka Halle, Leverkusen
Attendance: 1,800
Referees: Georgy Avalishvili (URS), Francisco Fajardo (ESP)

9 June
17:00

Boxscore

West Germany	73–70	Bulgaria
Scoring by half: 32–35, 41–35
Pts: Wadehn 19		Pts: Evtimov 19

Wilhelm-Dopatka Halle, Leverkusen
Attendance: 3,640
Referees: Alan Richardson (ENG), Zoran Grbac (YUG)

9 June
19:30

Boxscore

Israel	92–89 (OT)	Italy
Scoring by half: 46–38, 33–41 Overtime: 13–10
Pts: Berkovich 34		Pts: Magnifico 23

Wilhelm-Dopatka Halle, Leverkusen
Attendance: 3,690
Referees: José Manuel Reynoso (USA), Ion Antonescu (ROU)

== Knockout stage ==
=== Championship bracket ===
Quarter-finals
11 June – 20:30
West Germany	83
Spain	98
12 June – 20:30
Yugoslavia	91
Czechoslovakia	102
11 June – 18:00
Italy	97
France	71
12 June – 18:00
Soviet Union	104
Bulgaria	86

Semi-finals
14 June – 18:00
Spain	95
Czechoslovakia	98
14 June – 20:30
Italy	96
Soviet Union	112

Final
16 June – 20:00
Czechoslovakia	89
Soviet Union	120
Third place
15 June – 19:30
Spain	90
Italy	102

==== Quarterfinals ====
11 June
18:00

Boxscore

France	71–97	Italy
Scoring by half: 39–38, 32–59
Pts: Cham 19		Pts: Sacchetti 27

Hanns-Martin-Schleyer-Halle, Stuttgart
Attendance: 6,200
Referees: Costas Rigas (GRE), John Weiland (CAN)

11 June
20:30

Boxscore

Spain	98–83	West Germany
Scoring by half: 60–44, 38–39
Pts: San Epifanio 36		Pts: Schrempf 25

Hanns-Martin-Schleyer-Halle, Stuttgart
Attendance: 7,100
Referees: Costas Rigas (GRE), John Weiland (CAN)

12 June
18:00

Boxscore

Soviet Union	104–86	Bulgaria
Scoring by half: 52–45, 52–41
Pts: Valdis Valters 31		Pts: Ivan Cenov 19

Hanns-Martin-Schleyer-Halle, Stuttgart
Attendance: 2,810
Referees: Wieslaw Zych (POL), Jan Van Renen (NED)

12 June
20:30

Boxscore

Yugoslavia	91–102	Czechoslovakia
Scoring by half: 43–51, 48–51
Pts: D. Petrović 25		Pts: Brabenec 32

Hanns-Martin-Schleyer-Halle, Stuttgart
Attendance: 3,105
Referees: José Manuel Reynoso (USA), Todd Warnick (ISR)

==== Semifinals ====
14 June
18:00

Boxscore

Spain	95–98	Czechoslovakia
Scoring by half: 56–49, 39–49
Pts: Martín 26		Pts: Rajniak 31

Hanns-Martin-Schleyer-Halle, Stuttgart
Attendance: 6,050
Referees: John Weiland (CAN), Alan Richardson (ENG)

14 June
20:30

Boxscore

Italy	96–112	Soviet Union
Scoring by half: 40–73, 56–39
Pts: Vecchiato 23		Pts: Sabonis 36

Hanns-Martin-Schleyer-Halle, Stuttgart
Attendance: 6,130
Referees: Yvan Mainini (FRA), José Manuel Reynoso (USA)

==== Third place ====
15 June
19:30

Boxscore

Spain	90–102 (OT)	Italy
Scoring by half: 46–49, 38–35 Overtime: 6–18
Pts: Sibilio 21		Pts: Sacchetti 24

Hanns-Martin-Schleyer-Halle, Stuttgart
Attendance: 6,780
Referees: Lubomir Kotleba, Todd Warnick (ISR)

==== Final ====
16 June
20:00

Boxscore

Czechoslovakia	89–120	Soviet Union
Scoring by half: 47–54, 42–66
Pts: Kropilák 23		Pts: Valters 27

Hanns-Martin-Schleyer-Halle, Stuttgart
Attendance: 8,600
Referees: Costas Rigas (GRE), Yvan Mainini (FRA)

=== 5th to 8th place ===
Classification round
13 June – 20:30
West Germany	98
Yugoslavia	84
13 June – 18:00
France	107
Bulgaria	105

Fifth place
15 June – 17:00
West Germany	101
France	81
Seventh place
16 June – 18:00
Yugoslavia	105
Bulgaria	86

13 June
18:00

Boxscore

France	107–105 (OT)	Bulgaria
Scoring by half: 39–51, 51–39 Overtime: 17–15
Pts: Dubuisson 23		Pts: Mladenov 40

Hanns-Martin-Schleyer-Halle, Stuttgart
Attendance: 1,400
Referees: John Weiland (CAN), Francisco Fajardo (ESP)

13 June
20:30

Boxscore

West Germany	98–84	Yugoslavia
Scoring by half: 49–37, 49–47
Pts: Jackel 33		Pts: Sunara 23

Hanns-Martin-Schleyer-Halle, Stuttgart
Attendance: 3,910
Referees: Costas Rigas (GRE), Jan Van Renen (NED)

15 June
17:00

Boxscore

West Germany	100–81	France
Scoring by half: 49–42, 51–39
Pts: Schrempf 27		Pts: Ostrowski 22

Hanns-Martin-Schleyer-Halle, Stuttgart
Attendance: 6,820
Referees: Wieslaw Zych (POL), Zoran Grbac (YUG)

16 June
17:00

Boxscore

Yugoslavia	105–86	Bulgaria
Scoring by half: 56–44, 49–42
Pts: Petrović 34		Pts: Antov 16

Hanns-Martin-Schleyer-Halle, Stuttgart
Attendance: 5,000
Referees: Maurizio Martolini (ITA), Francisco Fajardo (ESP)

=== 9th to 12th place ===
Classification round
11 June – 15:30
Poland	86
Israel	91
12 June – 15:30
Romania	90
Netherlands	87

Ninth place
14 June – 15:30
Israel	90
Romania	89
Eleventh place
13 June – 15:30
Poland	102
Netherlands	100

11 June
15:30

Boxscore

Poland	86–91	Israel
Scoring by half: 45–40, 41–51
Pts: Zelig 25		Pts: Jamchi 29

Hanns-Martin-Schleyer-Halle, Stuttgart
Attendance: 2,500
Referees: Francisco Fajardo (ESP), Zoran Grbac (YUG)

12 June
15:30

Boxscore

Romania	90–87	Netherlands
Scoring by half: 46–46, 44–41
Pts: Cernat 24		Pts: Esveldt 23

Hanns-Martin-Schleyer-Halle, Stuttgart
Attendance: 1,600
Referees: Georgy Avalishvili (URS), Georgy Labov (BUL)

13 June
15:30

Boxscore

Poland	102–100	Netherlands
Scoring by half: 53–40, 49–60
Pts: Fikiel 24		Pts: Esveldt 20

Hanns-Martin-Schleyer-Halle, Stuttgart
Attendance: 1,200
Referees: Peter George (FRG), Ion Antonescu (ROU)

14 June
15:30

Boxscore

Israel	90–89	Romania
Scoring by half: 47–47, 43–42
Pts: Jamchi 39		Pts: Ermurache 21

Hanns-Martin-Schleyer-Halle, Stuttgart
Referees: Maurizio Martolini (ITA), Georgy Labov (BUL)

== Awards ==
1985 FIBA EuroBasket champions

Soviet Union
14th title

1985 FIBA EuroBasket MVP: Arvydas Sabonis ( Soviet Union)

All-Tournament Team
(Soviet Union) Valdis Valters
(Socialist Federal Republic of Yugoslavia) Dražen Petrović
(West Germany) Detlef Schrempf
(Spain) Fernando Martín
(Soviet Union) Arvydas Sabonis (MVP)

== Final standings ==
Rank	Team	Record
1st place, gold medalist(s)	Soviet Union	7–1
2nd place, silver medalist(s)	Czechoslovakia	4–4
3rd place, bronze medalist(s)	Italy	6–2
4	Spain	5–3
5	West Germany	5–3
6	France	2–6
7	Yugoslavia	5–3
8	Bulgaria	3–5
9	Israel	4–3
10	Romania	2–5
11	Poland	2–5
12	Netherlands	1–6

1st	2nd	3rd	4th
Soviet Union Alexander Volkov; Heino Enden; Sergei Tarakanov; Valdemaras Chomičius; Andrei Lopatov; Valeri Tikhonenko; Valdis Valters; Vladimir Tkachenko; Rimas Kurtinaitis; Sergejus Jovaiša; Alexander Belostenny; Arvydas Sabonis	Czechoslovakia Jaroslav Skála; Juraj Žuffa; Vlastimil Havlík; Peter Rajniak; Stano Kropilák; Zdeněk Böhm; Jiří Okáč; Igor Vraniak; Vladimír Vyoral; Kamil Brabenec; Otto Matický; Leoš Krejčí	Italy Giampiero Savio; Beppe Bosa; Ario Costa; Enrico Gilardi; Walter Magnifico; Roberto Brunamonti; Renato Villalta; Gus Binelli; Roberto Premier; Renzo Vecchiato; Pierlo Marzorati; Romeo Sacchetti	Spain Jordi Villacampa; José Luis Llorente; Cándido Sibilio; Josep María Margall; Andrés Jiménez; Fernando Romay; Fernando Martín; Vicente Gil; Joaquim Costa; Juan Domingo de la Cruz; Juan Manuel López Iturriaga; Juan Antonio San Epifanio
