= Zdeněk Kos =

Czech basketball player

Personal information
- Born: 23 June 1951 (age 75) Prague, Czechoslovakia
- Listed height: 6 ft 9 in (2.06 m)
- Listed weight: 210 lb (95 kg)

Career information
- Playing career: 1968–1981
- Position: Center

Career history
- 1968–1969: Slovan Orbis Praha
- 1969–1970: Slavia VŠ Praha
- 1970–1982: Dukla Olomouc
- 1982–1985: BK Klosterneuburg
- 1989–1990: TS Innsbruck

Career highlights
- As player: 3× Czechoslovak League champion (1970, 1973, 1975); 4× Czechoslovak Player of the Year (1974, 1975, 1977, 1978); 8× Czechoslovak League All-Star Five (1972–1975, 1977–1980); 3x Austrian champion (1983, 1984, 1985); Czechoslovak 20th Century Team (2001)
Medals
Men's basketball
Representing Czechoslovakia
EuroBasket
Bronze medal – third place	1977 Belgium
Bronze medal – third place	1981 Czechoslovakia

Zdeněk Kos (born 23 June 1951) is a Czech former basketball player and coach. He was voted to the Czechoslovak 20th Century Team in 2001. Kos was granted Austrian citizenship in 1996.

== Playing career ==
=== Club career ===
During his club playing career, Kos won three Czechoslovak League championships, in the years 1970, 1973, and 1975. He was also named the Czechoslovak Player of the Year four times, in the years 1974, 1975, 1977, and 1978. From 1982 to 1985, he played for BK Klosterneuburg in Austria, winning the national championship in each season. After returning to Olomouc in 1985, he went back to Austria in 1989, where he spent one season as player/coach at TS Innsbruck, before focussing on coaching.

=== National team career ===
With the senior Czechoslovak national team, Kos competed in the men's tournament at the 1972 Summer Olympics, the 1976 Summer Olympics, and the 1980 Summer Olympics. With Czechoslovakia, he also won bronze medals at the 1977 EuroBasket, and the 1981 EuroBasket.

== Coaching career ==
After his playing career, Kos worked as a basketball coach. He coached the Austrian men's national team from 1990 to 1993. Kos also worked as a coach in youth basketball in Klosterneuburg and Vienna for many years. From 2006 to 2008, Kos served as coach of the women's Flying Foxes Vienna, guiding the squad to Austrian championship titles in 2007 and 2008.

== Personal life ==
His son Zdeněk Kos junior (born 1974) played basketball in the Austrian Bundesliga in the late 1990s and the first half of the 2000s.

== See also ==
- Czechoslovak Basketball League career stats leaders
