= EuroBasket 1967 =

International basketball event

Koripallon Euroopan-mestaruuskilpailut 1967 Europamästerskapet i basket för herrar 1967

Tournament details
- Host country: Finland
- City: Helsinki and Tampere
- Dates: 28 September – 8 October
- Teams: 16
- Venue: 2 (in 2 host cities)

Final positions
- Champions: Soviet Union (9th title)
- Runners-up: Czechoslovakia
- Third place: Poland
- Fourth place: Bulgaria

Tournament statistics
- MVP: (Czechoslovakia) Jiří Zedníček
- Top scorer: (Greece) Giorgos Kolokithas (25.4 points per game)

The 1967 FIBA European Championship, commonly called FIBA EuroBasket 1967, was the fifteenth FIBA EuroBasket regional basketball championship, held by FIBA Europe.

== Venues ==
Helsinki	Tampere
Helsingin jäähalli Capacity 8 200	Tampereen jäähalli Capacity 10 200

== First round ==
=== Group A – Helsinki ===
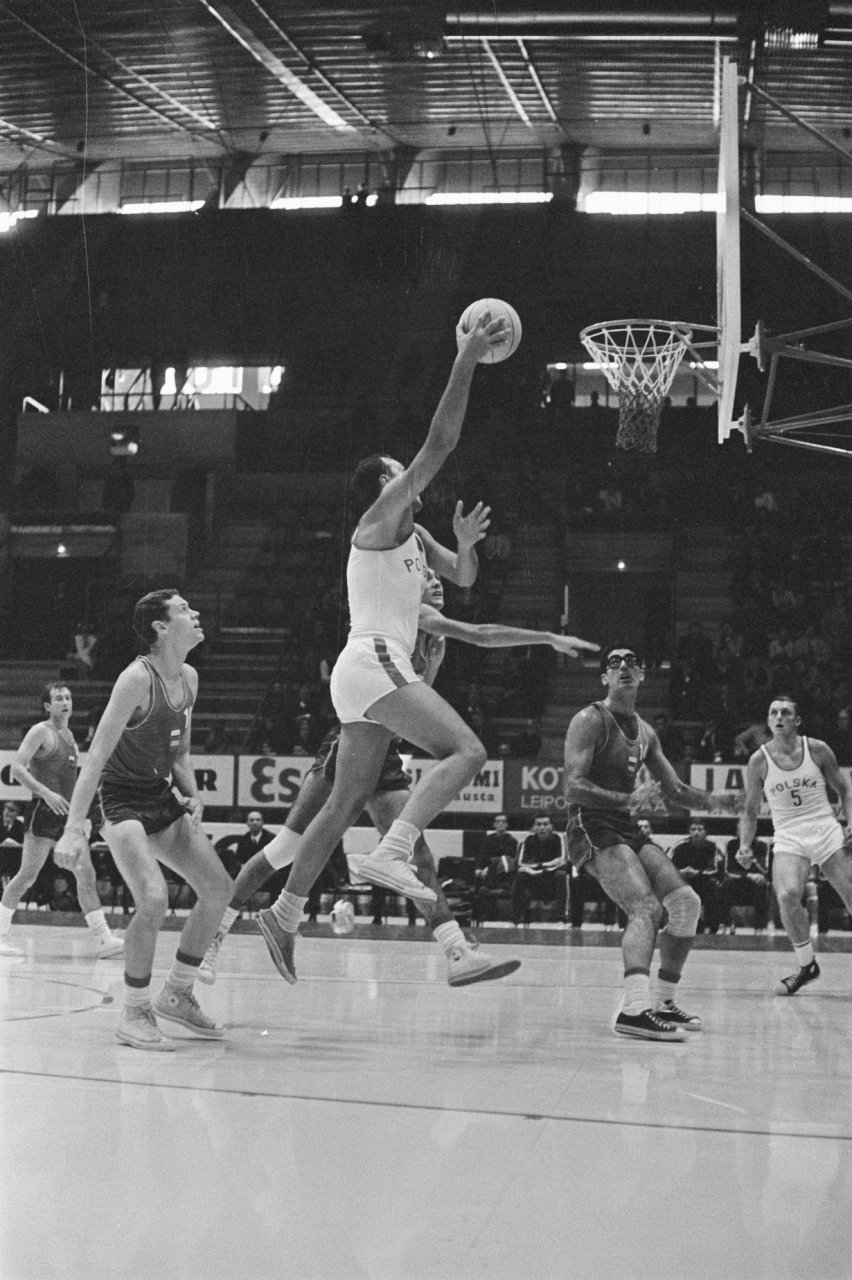
Spain–Poland.

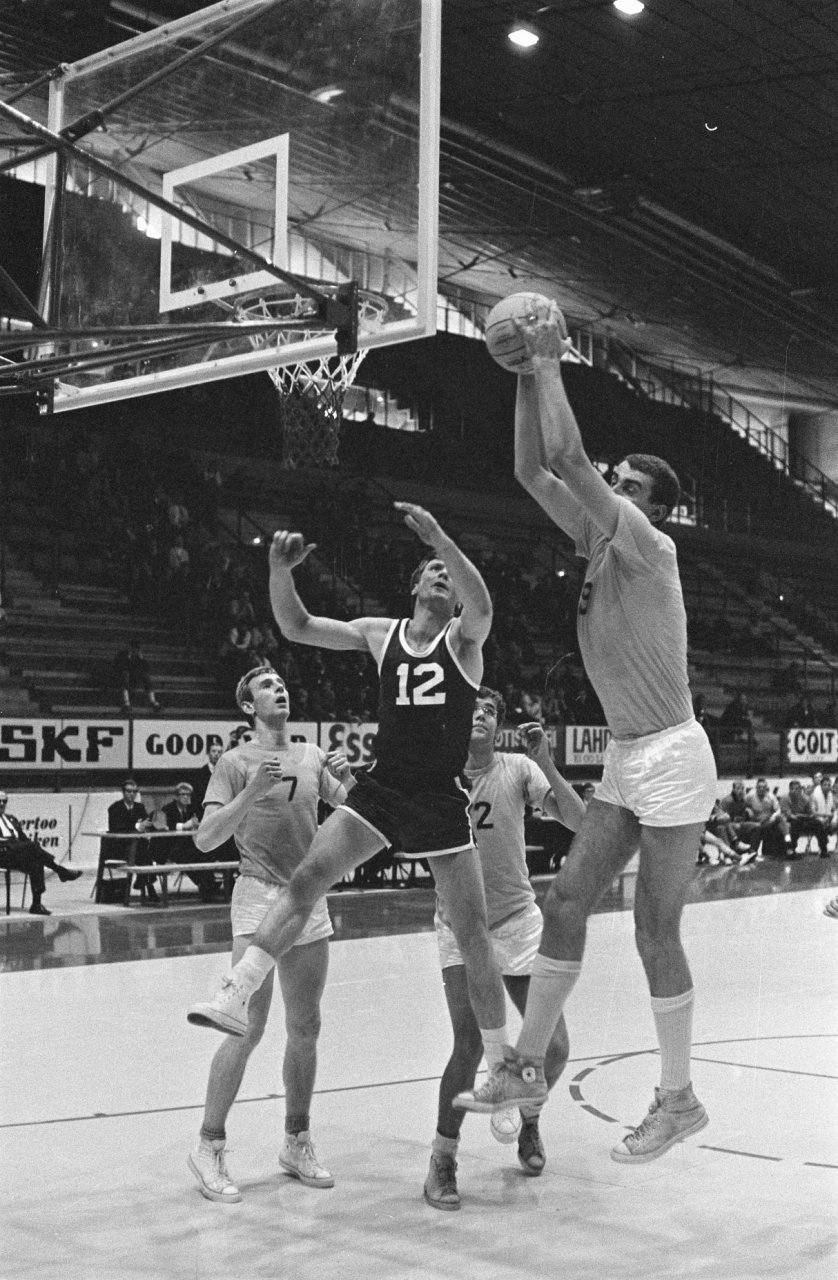
Belgium–Netherlands.

Spain	Romania	85–88
Belgium	Yugoslavia	66–73
Finland	Netherlands	83–70
Poland	Czechoslovakia	75–90
Belgium	Netherlands	82–70
Spain	Poland	71–88
Yugoslavia	Czechoslovakia	66–74
Finland	Romania	57–51
Netherlands	Yugoslavia	46–96
Belgium	Romania	74–77
Spain	Czechoslovakia	65–98
Finland	Poland	68–80
Netherlands	Romania	64–83
Belgium	Poland	68–98
Spain	Yugoslavia	68–82
Finland	Czechoslovakia	54–49
Netherlands	Poland	65–69
Belgium	Czechoslovakia	72–92
Finland	Spain	76–69
Yugoslavia	Romania	73–75
Netherlands	Czechoslovakia	68–78
Belgium	Spain	76–89
Poland	Romania	75–58
Finland	Yugoslavia	59–68
Romania	Czechoslovakia	51–69
Spain	Netherlands	79–71
Finland	Belgium	82–62
Yugoslavia	Poland	65–69

Pos.	Team	Matches	Wins	Losses	Results	Points	Diff.
1.	Czechoslovakia	7	6	1	550:451	12	+89
2.	Poland	7	6	1	554:485	12	+69
3.	Finland	7	5	2	479:449	10	+30
4.	Romania	7	4	3	483:497	8	−4
5.	Yugoslavia	7	4	3	523:457	8	+16
6.	Spain	7	2	5	526:579	4	−53
7.	Belgium	7	1	6	500:581	2	−81
8.	Netherlands	7	0	7	454:570	0	−116

=== Group B – Tampere ===
Bulgaria	Hungary	66–58
Israel	Soviet Union	65–93
Italy	East Germany	65–55
Greece	France	78–69
Bulgaria	Greece	64–66
Israel	Hungary	60–56
East Germany	Soviet Union	67–83
Italy	France	47–42
East Germany	France	56–68
Soviet Union	Hungary	85–54
Israel	Greece	75–75 aet. 91–81
Bulgaria	Italy	73–71
Greece	Hungary	69–60
Soviet Union	France	108–52
Israel	Italy	67–70
Bulgaria	East Germany	68–66
Bulgaria	France	65–67
Italy	Hungary	73–80
Israel	East Germany	74–67
Greece	Soviet Union	41–82
Israel	France	75–68
East Germany	Hungary	55–59
Bulgaria	Soviet Union	61–84
Italy	Greece	74–58
France	Hungary	56–51
Bulgaria	Israel	78–61
East Germany	Greece	69–56
Italy	Soviet Union	91–105

Pos.	Team	Matches	Wins	Losses	Results	Points	Diff.
1.	Soviet Union	7	7	0	640:431	14	+209
2.	Bulgaria	7	4	3	475:473	8	+2
3.	Italy	7	4	3	490:480	8	+10
4.	Israel	7	4	3	493:513	8	−20
5.	Greece	7	3	4	449:509	6	−60
6.	France	7	3	4	422:480	6	−58
7.	Hungary	7	2	5	418:464	4	−46
8.	East Germany	7	1	6	435:472	2	−37

== Knockout stage ==
=== Places 13 – 16 in Tampere ===
Team 1	Team 2	Res.
Hungary	Netherlands	76–71
Belgium	East Germany	63–78

=== Places 9 – 12 in Helsinki ===
Team 1	Team 2	Res.
Yugoslavia	France	75–69
Greece	Spain	85–85 aet. 95–99

=== Places 5 – 8 in Tampere ===
Team 1	Team 2	Res.
Italy	Romania	57–63
Finland	Israel	73–60

=== Places 1 – 4 in Helsinki ===
Team 1	Team 2	Res.
Czechoslovakia	Bulgaria	82–79
Soviet Union	Poland	108–68

=== Finals ===
Placement	Team 1	Team 2	Res.
15th place	Netherlands	Belgium	77–92
13th place	Hungary	East Germany	78–62
11th place	France	Greece	74–69
9th place	Yugoslavia	Spain	101–73
7th place	Italy	Israel	74–72
5th place	Romania	Finland	71–64
3rd place	Bulgaria	Poland	76–80
Final	Czechoslovakia	Soviet Union	77–89

1967 FIBA EuroBasket champions

Soviet Union
Ninth title

== Final standings ==
1. Soviet Union
2. Czechoslovakia
3. Poland
4. Bulgaria
5. Romania
6. Finland
7. Italy
8. Israel
9. Yugoslavia
10. Spain
11. France
12. Greece
13. Hungary
14. East Germany
15. Belgium
16. Netherlands

== Team rosters ==
1. Soviet Union: Sergei Belov, Modestas Paulauskas, Gennadi Volnov, Jaak Lipso, Anatoly Polivoda, Priit Tomson, Tõnno Lepmets, Alzhan Zharmukhamedov, Vladimir Andreev, Zurab Sakandelidze, Yuri Selikhov, Anatoli Krikun (Coach: Alexander Gomelsky)

2. Czechoslovakia: Jiří Zídek Sr., Jiří Zedníček, Jir i Ammer, Vladimir Pistelak, Frantisek Konvicka, Bohumil Tomasek, Robert Mifka, Jiri Ruzicka, Jan Bobrovsky, Karel Baroch, Jiří Marek, Celestyn Mrazek (Coach: Vladimir Heger)

3. Poland: Mieczysław Łopatka, Bohdan Likszo, Włodzimierz Trams, Grzegorz Korcz, Bolesław Kwiatkowski, Mirosław Kuczyński, Czesław Malec, Henryk Cegielski, Maciej Chojnacki, Waldemar Kozak, Kazimierz Frelkiewicz, Zbigniew Dregier (Coach: Witold Zagórski)

4. Bulgaria: Mincho Dimov, Ivan Vodenicharski, Cvjatko Barchovski, Georgi Khristov, Emil Mikhajlov, Slavejko Rajchev, Pando Pandov, Khristo Dojchinov, Georgi Genev, Boris Krastev, Temelaki Dimitrov, Bojcho Branzov (Coach: Kiril Khajtov)

9. Yugoslavia: Borut Basin, Ljubodrag Simonović, Zoran Marojević, Dragan Kapičić, Vladimir Cvetković, Dragoslav Ražnatović, Ratomir Tvrdić, Krešimir Ćosić, Damir Šolman, Goran Brajković, Aljoša Žorga, Petar Skansi (Coach: Ranko Žeravica)
