= František Konvička =

Czech basketball player (born 1938)

Personal information
- Born: 11 August 1938 (age 88) Okříšky, Czechoslovakia
- Listed height: 1.92 m (6 ft 4 in)
- Listed weight: 84 kg (185 lb)

Career information
- Playing career: 1957–1973
- Position: Small forward
- Coaching career: 1973–1981

Career history

Playing
- 1957–1969: Spartak Brno
- 1969–1970: Liège Basket
- 1970–1971: Oostende
- 1971–1973: Spartak Brno

Coaching
- 1973–1981: Spartak Brno
- 1980–1981: Czechoslovakia (assistant)

Career highlights
- As player: 3× FIBA European Selection (1965 2×, 1968); 6× Czechoslovak League champion (1958, 1962–1964, 1967, 1968); 4× Czechoslovak Player of the Year (1965–1968); 6× Czechoslovak League All-Star Five (1965–1969); Belgian League champion (1970); Czechoslovak 20th Century Team (2001); As head coach: 3× Czechoslovak League champion (1976–1978)
Medals
Men's basketball
Representing Czechoslovakia
EuroBasket
Silver medal – second place	1959 Turkey
Silver medal – second place	1967 Finland
Bronze medal – third place	1969 Italy

František Konvička (born 11 August 1938) is a former Czech professional basketball player and coach. At 6'3 3/4" tall (1.92 m), he played at the small forward position.

== Playing career ==
=== Club career ===
Konvička spent his club career playing with Spartak Brno. He reached two EuroLeague Finals, in 1964, and 1968, averaging 26.6 points per game.

=== National team career ===
Konvička represented the senior Czechoslovakia national basketball team for a decade, in international competitions. He won two EuroBasket silver medals, in 1959 and 1967, as well as a bronze medal in 1969.

== Coaching career ==
After his playing career, Konvička worked as a basketball coach.

== See also ==
- List of the best czech basketball players of the 20th century
- Czechoslovak Basketball League career stats leaders
- Basketball at the 1960 Summer Olympics
- FIBA All-Star Games
