= Jiří Zedníček =

Czechoslovak basketball player (born 1945)

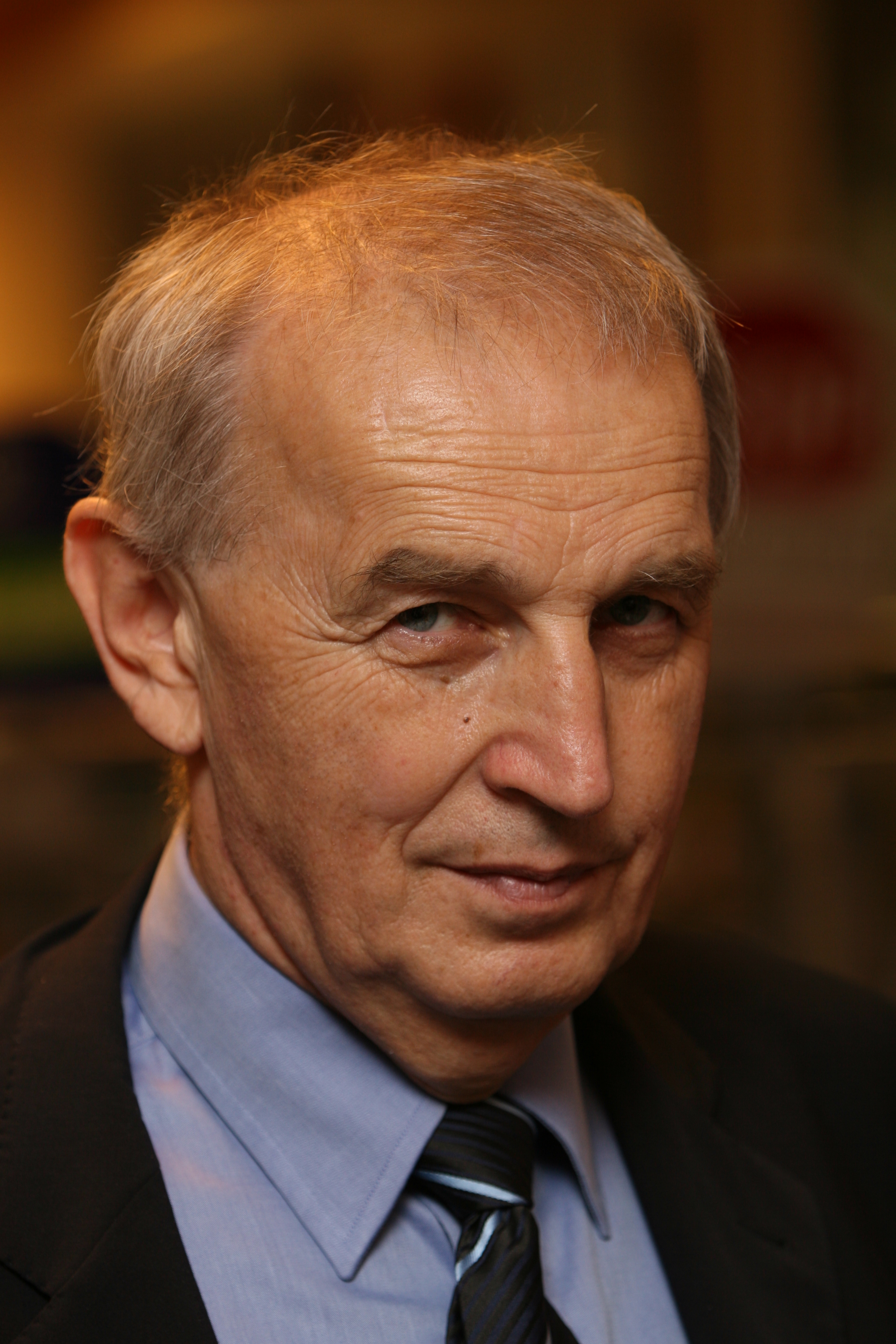
- Zedníček in 2008

Personal information
- Born: 14 February 1945 (age 81) Prague, Protectorate of Bohemia and Moravia
- Listed height: 1.93 m (6 ft 4 in)
- Listed weight: 92 kg (203 lb)

Career information
- Playing career: 1962–1982
- Position: Small forward

Career history
- 1962–1978: Slavia VŠ Praha
- 1978–1982: VŠDS Žilina

Career highlights
- FIBA EuroBasket MVP (1967); 5× FIBA European Selection (1966, 1967, 1969, 1971, 1972); FIBA Saporta Cup champion (1969); FIBA Saporta Cup Finals Top Scorer (1969); 7× Czechoslovak League champion (1965, 1966, 1969–1972, 1974); 6× Czechoslovak League All-Star Five (1967, 1969–1973)
Medals
Men's basketball
Representing Czechoslovakia
EuroBasket
| Silver medal – second place | 1967 Finland |
| Bronze medal – third place | 1969 Italy |

Jiří Zedníček (born 14 February 1945) is a Czech former professional basketball player. He was voted to the Czechoslovak 20th Century Team.

== Early life and early career ==
Jiří Zedníček was born on 14 February 1945 in Prague. He was born into a sports-oriented family and, thanks to his father, he also devoted himself to athletics, skiing and tennis. Due to his alleged lack of talent, he was not accepted into the Sparta Praha basketball club, but his father convinced him to try again, and so he began playing for Slavia VŠ Praha in 1962. After just two years at the club, he began playing in the top league for Slavia's senior team. He played for Slavia until 1978.

== Club career achievements ==
In his club career, Zedníček won the European-wide secondary level FIBA Cup Winner's Cup (later called FIBA Saporta Cup) championship, in the 1968–69 season. He was a member of the FIBA European Selection Team in 1966, 1967, 1969, 1971, and 1972.

== National team career ==
Zedníček represented the senior Czechoslovak national team at several EuroBaskets, and at the 1972 Summer Olympic Games. At the EuroBasket 1967, he was named the MVP of the tournament.

With the national team, he also won a silver medal at the EuroBasket in Finland, in 1967, and a bronze medal at the EuroBasket in Italy, in 1969. At the 1970 FIBA World Championship, he was a member of the Czech national team that finished the tournament in sixth place. He was also on the Czech team that finished in 10th place at the 1974 FIBA World Championship.

== End of professional career and late life ==
At the age of 29, he ended his career as a professional athlete and began to pursue his profession in computer science, but continued to play basketball. He also engaged in business activities and used his excellent knowledge of English. A few years later, he received an offer to coach a basketball team in Belgium, where he remained until the late 1980s. In 1990, after the Velvet Revolution, he accepted the position of head of Czechoslovak basketball. Until 2008, he held various official positions in Czech sports associations.

== See also ==
- Czechoslovak Basketball League career stats leaders
