= Martin Rančík =

Slovak basketball player

Personal information
- Born: June 5, 1978 (age 48) Nitra, Slovakia
- Listed height: 2.05 m (6 ft 9 in)
- Listed weight: 109 kg (240 lb)

Career information
- High school: Saint Louis Park (St. Louis Park, Minnesota)
- College: Iowa State (1997–2001)
- NBA draft: 2001: undrafted
- Playing career: 2001–2016
- Position: Power forward / center
- Number: 51

Career history
- 2001–2004: Olimpia Milano
- 2004–2005: Fortitudo Bologna
- 2005–2006: Olympiacos
- 2006–2008: Bilbao Basket
- 2008–2009: Estudiantes
- 2010: Bilbao Basket
- 2010: Saski Baskonia
- 2010–2011: Lucentum Alicante
- 2012–2013: Inter Bratislava
- 2013: ČEZ Nymburk
- 2014–2016: Inter Bratislava

Career highlights
- Italian League champion (2005); Slovak League champion (2013); 2× Slovak Cup winner (2015, 2016); 2× Slovak Player of the Year (2001, 2002)

Martin Rančík (born June 5, 1978) is a Slovak former professional basketball player.

== College career ==
Rančík played college basketball with the Iowa State Cyclones, from 1997–2001.

== Professional career ==
During his pro career, Rančík was named the Slovak Player of the Year, in 2001 and 2002.

== Personal life ==
Rančík's younger brother, Radoslav Rančík, is also a former professional basketball player.
