= Sergei Belov =

Soviet professional basketball player (1944–2013)

Sergei Belov Сергей Белов
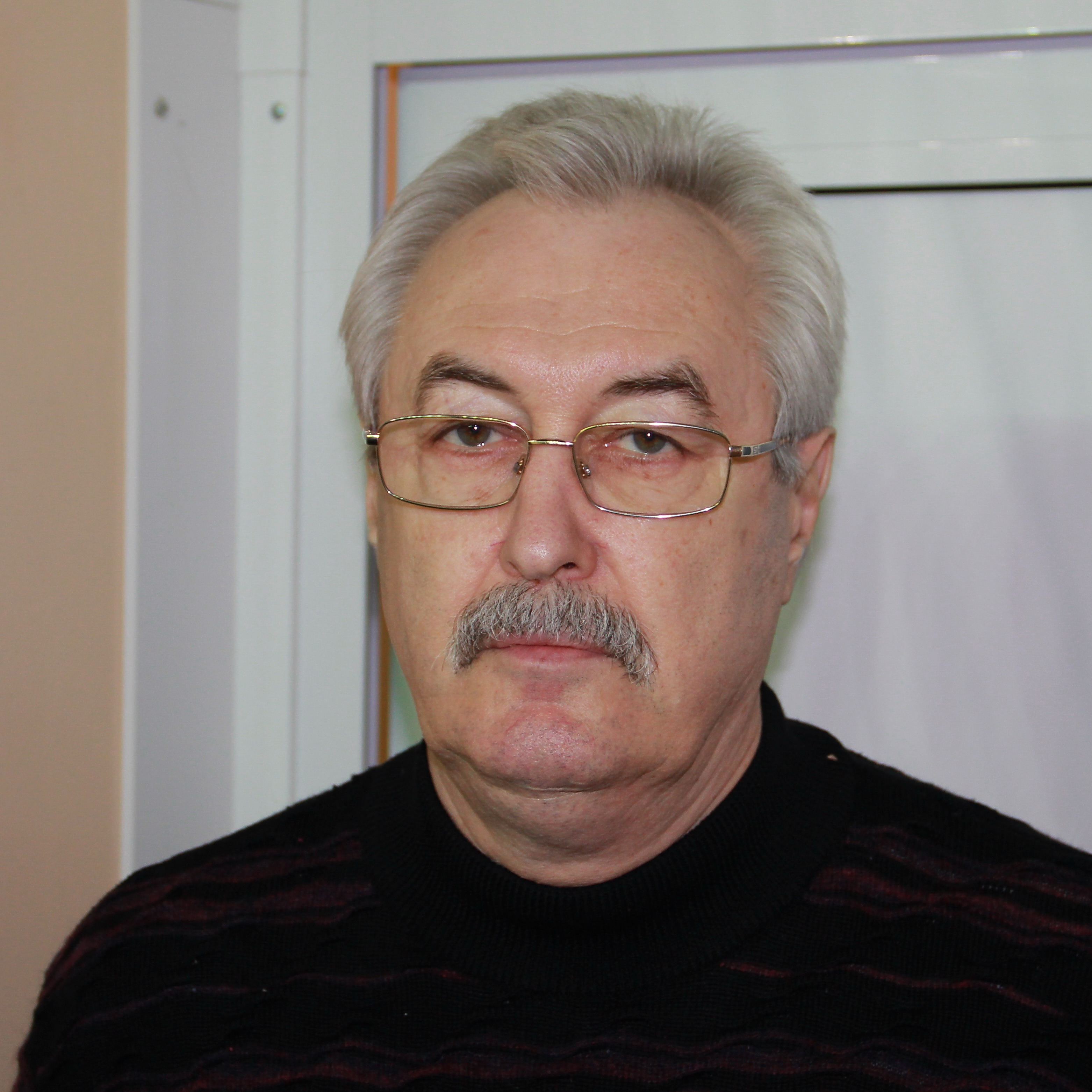
- Belov in 2012

Personal information
- Born: 23 January 1944 Nashchyokovo, Russian SFSR, Soviet Union
- Died: 3 October 2013 (aged 69) Perm, Russia
- Listed height: 191 cm (6 ft 3 in)
- Listed weight: 82 kg (181 lb)

Career information
- Playing career: 1964–1980
- Position: Shooting guard
- Number: 5,7,10
- Coaching career: 1981–2004

Career history

Playing
- 1964–1967: Uralmash Sverdlovsk
- 1968–1980: CSKA Moscow

Coaching
- 1981–1982: CSKA Moscow
- 1989–1990: CSKA Moscow
- 1990–1993: Basket Cassino
- 1999–2004: Ural Great Perm

Career highlights
- As player: 2× EuroLeague champion (1969, 1971); 4× FIBA European Selection (1969, 1971, 1972, 1974); 11× USSR League champion (1969–1974, 1976–1980); 2× USSR Cup winner (1972, 1973); FIBA EuroBasket MVP (1969); FIBA World Cup MVP (1970); Honoured Master of Sports of the USSR (1968); Order of the Badge of Honour; Medal "For Distinguished Labour"; FIBA's 50 Greatest Players (1991); FIBA Order of Merit (1995); FIBA All-Time EuroStars Team (2007); 50 Greatest EuroLeague Contributors (2008); 101 Greats of European Basketball (2018); As head coach: 2× USSR League champion (1982, 1990); 2× Russian Championship champion (2001, 2002); Russian Cup winner (2004); North European League champion (2001)
- Basketball Hall of Fame
- FIBA Hall of Fame
Medals
Men's basketball
Representing Soviet Union
Summer Olympic Games
| Gold medal – first place | 1972 Munich |
| Bronze medal – third place | 1968 Mexico City |
| Bronze medal – third place | 1976 Montreal |
| Bronze medal – third place | 1980 Moscow |
FIBA World Cup
| Gold medal – first place | 1967 Uruguay |
| Gold medal – first place | 1974 Puerto Rico |
| Silver medal – second place | 1978 Philippines |
| Bronze medal – third place | 1970 Yugoslavia |
FIBA Eurobasket
| Gold medal – first place | 1967 Finland |
| Gold medal – first place | 1969 Italy |
| Gold medal – first place | 1971 West Germany |
| Gold medal – first place | 1979 Italy |
| Silver medal – second place | 1975 Yugoslavia |
| Silver medal – second place | 1977 Belgium |
| Bronze medal – third place | 1973 Spain |
Summer Universiade
| Gold medal – first place | 1970 Turin |
Head coach for Russia
FIBA World Cup
| Silver medal – second place | 1994 Canada |
| Silver medal – second place | 1998 Greece |
FIBA Eurobasket
| Bronze medal – third place | 1997 Finland |

Sergei Alexandrovich Belov (Russian: Серге́й Алекса́ндрович Бело́в; 23 January 1944 – 3 October 2013) was a Russian professional basketball player, most noted for playing for CSKA Moscow and the senior Soviet Union national basketball team. He is considered to be one of the best European basketball players of all time, and was given the honour of lighting the Olympic Cauldron with the Olympic flame during the 1980 Summer Olympics opening ceremony, in Moscow.

In 1991, Belov was named by FIBA as the Best FIBA Player ever. He became the first international player to be inducted into the Naismith Memorial Basketball Hall of Fame on 11 May 1992. Belov was named to the FIBA All-Time EuroStars Team in 2007. He was also inducted into the FIBA Hall of Fame in 2007 and was named one of the 50 Greatest EuroLeague Contributors in 2008. In 2018, he was named one of the 101 Greats of European Basketball.

== Early life ==
Belov was born in the village of Nashchyokovo, Shegarsky District, Tomsk Oblast, Soviet Union. In 1968, he became an Honoured Master of Sports of the USSR. He became an Honoured Coach of Russia in 1995, and served as President of the Russian Basketball Federation (1993–98).

== Career ==
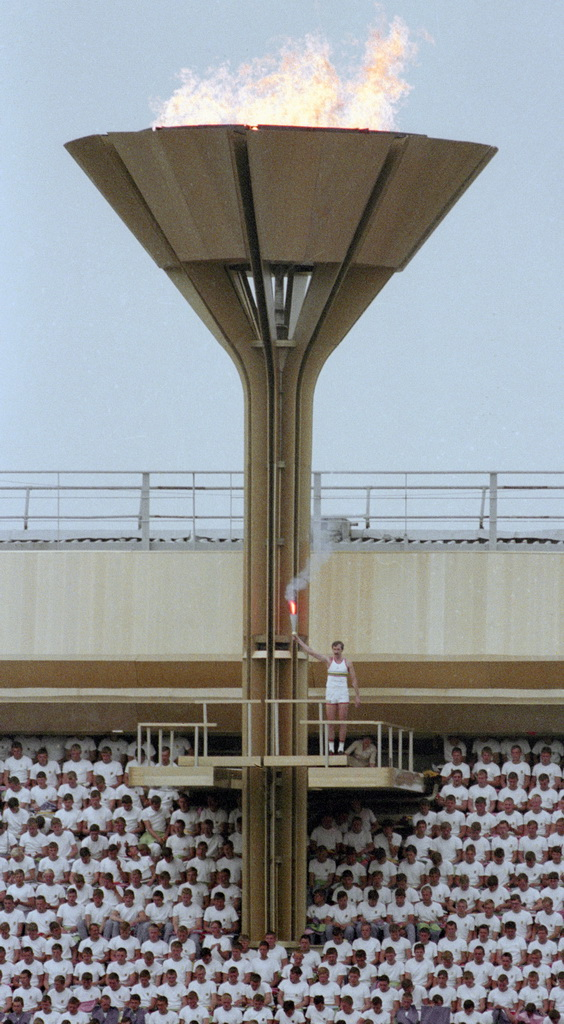
Belov lighting the Olympic Cauldron during the 22nd Olympics opening ceremony in Moscow, 1980

At the age of twenty, Belov made his debut in the USSR League, with the team of Uralmash Sverdlovsk, where he played from 1964 to 1967. He then played with CSKA Moscow for twelve years. With CSKA, he won the USSR League championship eleven times (1969, 1970, 1971, 1972, 1973, 1974, 1976, 1977, 1978, 1979, 1980), the USSR Cup twice (1972, 1973), and the EuroLeague twice, in 1969 and 1971.

As a member of the senior Soviet Union national basketball team, for nearly fourteen years (1967–1980), Belov helped them win a Summer Olympic Games gold medal in 1972, and three bronze medals in 1968, 1976, and 1980. He also helped them to become the FIBA World Cup champions in 1967 and 1974, and the EuroBasket champions in 1967, 1969, 1971, and 1979. He also won the Summer Universiade, in 1970, as well.

In the gold medal game of the 1972 Summer Olympics, Belov scored 20 points against the United States national basketball team, as the Soviet Union controversially defeated the USA, by a score of 51–50, to win the gold.

== Later life ==
Belov was the head coach of CSKA Moscow, with whom he won the USSR League championship in 1982 and 1990. He was also the head coach of Ural Great Perm. With Ural Great Perm, he won the Russian Championship title in both 2001 and 2002, the Russian Cup in 2004, and the North European League championship in 2001.

As the head coach of the senior men's Russian national basketball team, he won silver medals at both the 1994 FIBA World Championship and the 1998 FIBA World Championship, and the bronze medal at the EuroBasket 1997. He was also Russia's head coach at the EuroBasket 1995 and the EuroBasket 1999.

Belov died on 3 October 2013, in Perm, Russia.

== Legacy ==
Asteroid 296638 Sergeibelov, discovered by Timur Kryachko in 2009, was named in his memory. The official naming citation was published by the Minor Planet Center on 16 March 2014 (M.P.C. 87546).

== Awards and accomplishments ==
- As a player:
  - 2 × EuroLeague Champion: 1969, 1971
  - 3 × EuroLeague Finals Top Scorer: 1970, 1971, 1973
  - 11 × USSR League Champion: 1969, 1970, 1971, 1972, 1973, 1974, 1976, 1977, 1978, 1979, 1980
  - 2 × USSR Cup Winner: 1972, 1973
  - Summer Universiade:
    - Gold: 1970
  - Summer Olympic Games:
    - Gold: 1972
    - Bronze: 1968, 1976, 1980
  - FIBA World Cup:
    - Gold: 1967, 1974
    - Silver: 1978
    - Bronze: 1970 (MVP)
  - FIBA EuroBasket:
    - Gold: 1967, 1969 (MVP), 1971, 1979
    - Silver: 1975, 1977
    - Bronze: 1973
  - Honoured Master of Sports of the USSR
  - Order of the Badge of Honour
  - Medal "For Distinguished Labour"
  - FIBA's 50 Greatest Players: 1991 (Voted #1)
  - Naismith Memorial Basketball Hall of Fame: 1992
  - FIBA All-Time EuroStars Team: 2007
  - FIBA Hall of Fame: 2007
  - 50 Greatest EuroLeague Contributors: 2008
  - 101 Greats of European Basketball: 2018
- As a head coach:
  - 2 × USSR League Champion: 1982, 1990
  - FIBA Order of Merit: 1995
  - 2 × Russian Championship Champion: 2001, 2002
  - Russian Cup Winner: 2004
  - North European League Champion: 2001
  - FIBA World Cup:
    - Silver: 1994, 1998
  - FIBA EuroBasket:
    - Bronze: 1997

== References and notes ==
Olympic Games
| Preceded by Charles Morgan Kerr | Final Olympic torchbearer Moscow 1980 | Succeeded by Sanda Dubravčić |
| Preceded by Stéphane Préfontaine and Sandra Henderson | Final Summer Olympic torchbearer Moscow 1980 | Succeeded by Rafer Johnson |
