= Alena Kašová =

Slovak basketball player

Personal information
- Nationality: Slovak
- Born: 6 March 1960 (age 66) Nitra, Czechoslovakia

Sport
- Country: Czechoslovakia
- Sport: Basketball

Alena Kašová (born Alena Bardoňová; born 6 March 1960) is a Slovak basketball player who competed for Czechoslovakia in the women's tournament at the 1988 Summer Olympics.

In 1977, aged 17, she debuted for the Czechoslovakia women's national basketball team. She then competed at the 1978 European Championship in Poland and contributed to her country's bronze medal. She later was married and left the team in 1980 to have a son. She only played sparingly for the national team in the early- and mid-1980s due to knee injuries, but in 1988 returned and competed at the Olympics. On the club level, she competed for Slovan ChZJD and was named the Slovak Basketball Player of the Year in 1983 and 1984.
