= Vladimír Pištělák =

Czech basketball player

Personal information
- Born: 30 July 1940 (age 86) Brno, Protectorate of Bohemia and Moravia
- Listed height: 6 ft 2.5 in (1.89 m)
- Listed weight: 185 lb (84 kg)

Career information
- Playing career: 1958–1973
- Coaching career: 1980–1988

Career history

Playing
- 1958–1969: Spartak ZJŠ Brno
- 1969–1971: Mechelen
- 1971–1973: Spartak ZJŠ Brno

Coaching
- 1980–1988: Czechoslovakia (youth)

Career highlights
- As a player: 3× FIBA European Selection Team (1965 2×, 1968); 5× Czechoslovak League champion (1962–1964, 1967, 1968); 3× Czechoslovak League All-Star Five (1965, 1968, 1969); Czechoslovak Player of the Year (1969); Belgian Cup winner (1970); Czechoslovak 20th Century Team (2001)
Medals
Men's basketball
Representing Czechoslovakia
EuroBasket
Silver medal – second place	1967 Finland
Bronze medal – third place	1969 Italy

Vladimír Pištělák (born 30 July 1940) is a Czech former basketball player and coach. He was voted to the Czechoslovak 20th Century Team in 2001.

== Playing career ==
=== Club career ===
In 1959, Pištelak made his debut in the EuroLeague. His European journey brought plenty of success. Pištelak was one of the best scorers of the 1963/64 season, averaging 18.5 points per game and leading his team to the EuroLeague Final against Real Madrid. Overall, in the 6 seasons he played in the EuroLeague, Pištelak reached the EuroLeague Finals twice (1964, 1968), averaging 15.4 points per game. He also reached two semifinals (1968, 1969). The Czechoslovak international was among the Top 20 best scorers in three EuroLeague seasons and the Top 10 in two of those seasons.

Pištělák won five Czechoslovak League championships (1962, 1963, 1964, 1967, and 1968), and he was named the Czechoslovak Player of the Year, in 1969. He was named to the FIBA European Selection Team in 1965 and 1968. He won the Belgian Cup title in 1970.

=== National team career ===
With the senior Czechoslovak national team, Pištělák competed in the men's tournament at the 1960 Summer Olympics. With Czechoslovakia, he also won the silver medal at the 1967 EuroBasket, and the bronze medal at the 1969 EuroBasket.

== Coaching career ==
After his playing career, Pištělák worked as a basketball coach.
