= Jan Bobrovský =

Czech basketball player, basketball coach and local politician

Personal information
- Born: 29 March 1945 (age 81) Rosice, Protectorate of Bohemia and Moravia
- Listed height: 6 ft 6 3/4 in (2.00 m)
- Listed weight: 220 lb (100 kg)

Career information
- Playing career: 1963–1983
- Position: Shooting guard / small forward
- Coaching career: 1985–2015

Career history

Playing
- 1963–1972: Spartak ZJŠ Brno
- 1972–1973: Dukla Olomouc
- 1973–1978: Zbrojovka Brno
- 1978–1983: Slavia VŠD Žilina

Coaching
- 1985: Czechoslovakia (assistant)
- 1985–1988: Zbrojovka Brno
- 1991–1992: Czechoslovakia
- 1993–2015: BK Brno Women
- 1997–2008: Czech Republic Women

Career highlights
- As a player: 2× FIBA European Selection (1965 2×); 7× Czechoslovak League champion (1964, 1967, 1968, 1973, 1976–1978); 2× Czechoslovak Player of the Year (1971, 1973); 14× Czechoslovak League All-Star Five (1965–1978); Czechoslovak 20th Century Team (2001); As a head coach: 3× Czechoslovak League champion (1986–1988); 14× Czech Women's League champion (1996–2008, 2010)
Medals
Men's basketball
Representing Czechoslovakia
FIBA EuroBasket
Silver medal – second place	1967 Finland
Bronze medal – third place	1969 Italy
Women's basketball
Head coach for Czech Republic
FIBA EuroBasket Women
Silver medal – second place	2003 Greece
Gold medal – first place	2005 Turkey

Jan Bobrovský (born 29 March 1945) is a Czech basketball coach, sports official and former professional player. He is listed on the honor meritorious deed Sports Masters. His son in law is a former football defender Petr Křivánek.

== Basketball playing career ==
Bobrovský mainly played with Spartak ZJŠ Brno / Zbrojovka Brno and Czechoslovakia, with whom he participated in the 1972 Olympics and six European Championships, where he won the silver and one bronze medal. At the 1970 World Championship was the second best scorer of the national team of Czechoslovakia. For Czechoslovakia he played a total of 267 matches, including matches in the Olympic Games (including training), World Championships and European Championships, and scored a total of 748 points in 78 matches. In 1965 he was nominated for two teams match up choosing to FIBA Europe Festivals.

As a player of Zbrojovka Brno between 1958 and 1972, he was seven times champion and five times runner-up of Czechoslovakia. In the Czechoslovak Basketball League after 1962 (introduction of detailed statistics matches) he scored 9,915 points. With Zbrojovka Brno has been successful in the European Champions Cup, when he lost twice in the finals against Real Madrid (1963–64, 1967–68) and twice played in the semi-finals (1962–63, 1968–69). In the World Cup Intercontinental clubs in January 1969 in Zbrojovka Brno semifinal win over Real Madrid and 84–77 in the finals defeated American Akron Goodyear Wingfoots 71:84. [Ed. 1]

== Basketball coaching career ==
After finishing his playing career, Bobrovský successfully he worked as a coach in Zbrojovka Brno (men) and IMOS Brno - Žabovřesky (women) and representative teams of Czechoslovakia respectively. He did the same for the Czech Republic national teams (men & women). As a coach between 1974 and 1980 he was three times champion and twice runner-up of Czechoslovakia.

In 2001, in a poll about the best Czech basketball players of the twentieth century, he ended up tied for 5th place. In 2013 he was inducted into the Czech Basketball Federation Hall of Fame.

== Political career ==
In the municipal elections of 1994 Bobrovský was elected as an independent for ODA to the borough council Brno-Žabovřesky. The mandate of representative district upheld in municipal elections in 1998, even as a non-ODA in 2002, and 2006.

In elections to the Senate in 2014 as an independent candidate for the ODS in the district no. 60 - Brno city. With a score of 15.77% of the vote, he finished in 3rd place and did not advance to the second round.

== See also ==
- List of EuroBasket Women winning head coaches
- Czechoslovak Basketball League career stats leaders
