= Vlastimil Havlík =

Czech basketball player

Personal information
- Born: 26 January 1957 (age 69) Brno, Czechoslovakia
- Listed height: 6 ft 3 in (1.91 m)
- Listed weight: 175 lb (79 kg)

Career information
- Playing career: 1975–1998
- Position: Shooting guard
- Coaching career: 2005–2012

Career history

Playing
- 1975–1983: Zbrojovka Brno
- 1983–1984: Dukla Olomouc
- 1984–1988: Zbrojovka Brno
- 1991–1992: TTS Trenčín
- 1996–1998: Opava

Coaching
- 2005–2006: Houseři Brno
- 2007–2012: BK Brno Women (assistant)

Career highlights
- As player: 6× Czechoslovak League champion (1976–1978, 1986–1988); Czechoslovak Player of the Year (1986); 6× Czechoslovak League All-Star Five (1981, 1983–1987); Czechoslovak 20th Century Team (2001)
Medals
Representing Czechoslovakia
Men's basketball
EuroBasket
| Silver medal – second place | 1985 West Germany |
| Bronze medal – third place | 1981 Czechoslovakia |

Vlastimil Havlík (born 26 January 1957) is a Czech former basketball player and coach. He was voted to the Czechoslovak 20th Century Team in 2001.

== Professional career ==
During his club career, Havlík won six Czechoslovak League championships (1976, 1977, 1978, 1986, 1987, and 1988). He was also named the Czechoslovak Player of the Year, in 1986.

== National team career ==
With the senior Czechoslovak national team, Havlík competed in the men's tournament at the 1980 Summer Olympics. With Czechoslovakia, he also won the bronze medal at the 1981 EuroBasket, and the silver medal at the 1985 EuroBasket.

== See also ==
- Czechoslovak Basketball League career stats leaders
