= Zdeněk Douša =

Czech basketball player (1947–2023)

Personal information
- Born: 5 March 1947 Prague, Czechoslovakia
- Died: 3 November 2023 (aged 76)

Career highlights
- Czechoslovak League All-Star Five (1975); Czechoslovak 20th Century Team (2001)
Medals
Representing Czechoslovakia
Men's basketball
EuroBasket
| Bronze medal – third place | 1977 Belgium |

Zdeněk Douša (5 March 1947 – 3 November 2023) was a Czech basketball player. He was voted to the Czechoslovak 20th Century Team in 2001.

With the senior Czechoslovak national team, Douša competed in the men's tournament at the 1972 Summer Olympics, the 1976 Summer Olympics, and the 1980 Summer Olympics. With Czechoslovakia, he also won the bronze medal at the 1977 EuroBasket.

Douša died on 3 November 2023, at the age of 76.

== See also ==
- Czechoslovak Basketball League career stats leaders
