= Czech Basketball Player of the Year =

The Czech Basketball Player of the Year is the annual award for the best men's Czech basketball player. From 1965 to 1991, the award was for the best male basketball player from the nation of Czechoslovakia, and since 1992, the award is for the best male basketball player from the nation of the Czech Republic.

== Czechoslovak Player of the Year (1965–1991) ==
The award for the best men's basketball player of the year, with Czechoslovak citizenship, from 1965 to 1991.

Year	Czechoslovak Player of the Year (1965–1991)
Year	Player
1965	František Konvička
1966	František Konvička (2)
1967	František Konvička (3)
1968	František Konvička (4)
1969	Vladimír Pištělák
1970	Jiří Zídek Sr.
1971	Jan Bobrovský
1972	Jiří Zídek Sr. (2)
1973	Jan Bobrovský (2)
1974	Zdeněk Kos
1975	Zdeněk Kos (2)
1976	Kamil Brabenec
1977	Zdeněk Kos (3)
1978	Zdeněk Kos (4)
1979	Stanislav Kropilák
1980	Stanislav Kropilák (2)
1981	Jaroslav Skála
1982	Stanislav Kropilák (3)
1983	Stanislav Kropilák (4)
1984	Zdeněk Böhm
1985	Stanislav Kropilák (5)
1986	Vlastimil Havlík
1987	Oto Matický
1988	Oto Matický (2)
1989	Oto Matický (3)
1990	Josef Jelínek
1991	Jan Svoboda

=== Czechoslovak Basketball League All-Star Five ===
The Czechoslovak Basketball League All-Star Five consisted of the five basketball players that were voted as being the best players of each season's Czechoslovak Basketball League. The teams were selected from the 1964–65 season, through the 1991–92 season.

- 1964–65: František Konvička, Jiří Zídek Sr., Jiří Růžička, Vladimír Pištělák, Jan Bobrovský
- 1965–66: Jiří Zídek Sr., František Konvička, Jan Bobrovský, Jiří Růžička, Karel Baroch
- 1966–67: Jiří Zídek Sr., Jiří Zedníček, Jan Bobrovský, František Konvička, Jiří Růžička
- 1967–68: František Konvička, Jiří Zídek Sr., Vladimír Pištělák, Jan Bobrovský, Jiří Růžička
- 1968–69: Jiří Zedníček, Jiří Zídek Sr., František Konvička, Vladimír Pištělák, Jan Bobrovský
- 1969–70: Jiří Růžička, Jiří Zídek Sr., Jiří Zedníček, Milan Voračka, Jan Bobrovský
- 1970–71: Jiří Zídek Sr., Jiří Zedníček, Jan Bobrovský, Jiří Pospíšil, Karel Baroch
- 1971–72: Jiří Zídek Sr., Jan Bobrovský, Jiří Zedníček, Jiří Růžička, Zdeněk Kos
- 1972–73: Jan Bobrovský, Zdeněk Kos, Jiří Pospíšil, Jiří Zedníček, Jiří Zídek Sr.
- 1973–74: Zdeněk Kos, Jiří Zídek Sr., Jan Bobrovský, Kamil Brabenec, Jiří Pospíšil
- 1974–75: Zdeněk Kos, Zdeněk Douša, Jan Bobrovský, Kamil Brabenec, Jiří Pospíšil
- 1975–76: Vojtěch Petr, Kamil Brabenec, Jan Bobrovský, Stanislav Kropilák, Jiří Konopásek
- 1976–77: Zdeněk Kos, Stanislav Kropilák, Jan Bobrovský, Jiří Pospíšil, Kamil Brabenec
- 1977–78: Zdeněk Kos, Stanislav Kropilák, Jan Bobrovský, Jiří Pospíšil, Kamil Brabenec
- 1978–79: Stanislav Kropilák, Zdeněk Kos, Jiří Pospíšil, Kamil Brabenec, Gustáv Hraška
- 1979–80: Stanislav Kropilák, Kamil Brabenec, Zdeněk Kos, Gustáv Hraška, Jiří Pospíšil
- 1980–81: Jaroslav Skála, Stanislav Kropilák, Gustáv Hraška, Vlastimil Havlík, Kamil Brabenec
- 1981–82: Stanislav Kropilák, Jaroslav Skála, Gustáv Hraška, Vlastibor Klimeš, Zdeněk Böhm
- 1982–83: Stanislav Kropilák, Jaroslav Skála, Gustáv Hraška, Zdeněk Böhm, Vlastimil Havlík
- 1983–84: Zdeněk Böhm, Stanislav Kropilák, Jaroslav Skála, Vlastimil Havlík, Kamil Brabenec
- 1984–85: Stanislav Kropilák, Jaroslav Skála, Zdeněk Böhm, Peter Rajniak, Vlastimil Havlík
- 1985–86: Vlastimil Havlík, Kamil Brabenec, Oto Matický, Leoš Krejčí, Jaroslav Skála
- 1986–87: Oto Matický, Vlastimil Havlík, Kamil Brabenec, Juraj Žuffa, Jiří Okáč
- 1987–88: Oto Matický, Richard Petruška, Josef Jelínek, Jozef Michalko, Štefan Svitek
- 1988–89: Oto Matický, Richard Petruška, Štefan Svitek, Josef Jelínek, Vladimír Vyoral
- 1989–90: Josef Jelínek, Vladimír Vyoral, Michal Ježdík, Václav Hrubý, Jozef Michalko
- 1991–92: Jan Svoboda, Pavel Bečka, Václav Hrubý, Michal Ježdík, Stanislav Kameník

=== Players with multiple All-Star Five selections ===
The following table only lists players with at least two total selections.

Player	Number Of Selections	Years Selected
(Czechoslovakia) Jan Bobrovský	14	(1965, 1966, 1967, 1968, 1969, 1970, 1971, 1972, 1973, 1974, 1975, 1976, 1977, 1978)
(Czechoslovakia) Kamil Brabenec	11	(1974, 1975, 1976, 1977, 1978, 1979, 1980, 1981, 1984, 1986, 1987)
(Czechoslovakia) Jiří Zídek Sr.	10	(1965, 1966, 1967, 1968, 1969, 1970, 1971, 1972, 1973, 1974)
(Czechoslovakia) - (Slovakia) Stanislav Kropilák	10	(1976, 1977, 1978, 1979, 1980, 1981, 1982, 1983, 1984, 1985)
(Czechoslovakia) Jiří Pospíšil	8	(1971, 1973, 1974, 1975, 1977, 1978, 1979, 1980)
(Czechoslovakia) Zdeněk Kos	8	(1972, 1973, 1974, 1975, 1977, 1978, 1979, 1980)
(Czechoslovakia) Jiří Růžička	6	(1965, 1966, 1967, 1968, 1970, 1972)
(Czechoslovakia) Jiří Zedníček	6	(1967, 1969, 1970, 1971, 1972, 1973)
(Czechoslovakia) Vlastimil Havlík	6	(1981, 1983, 1984, 1985, 1986, 1987)
(Czechoslovakia) Jaroslav Skála	6	(1981, 1982, 1983, 1984, 1985, 1986)
(Czechoslovakia) František Konvička	5	(1965, 1966, 1967, 1968, 1969)
(Czechoslovakia) - (Slovakia) Gustáv Hraška	5	(1979, 1980, 1981, 1982, 1983)
(Czechoslovakia) Zdeněk Böhm	4	(1982, 1983, 1984, 1985)
(Czechoslovakia) - (Slovakia) Oto Matický	4	(1986, 1987, 1988, 1989)
(Czechoslovakia) Vladimír Pištělák	3	(1965, 1968, 1969)
(Czechoslovakia) Josef Jelínek	3	(1988, 1989, 1990)
(Czechoslovakia) Karel Baroch	2	(1966, 1971)
(Czechoslovakia) - (Slovakia) Richard Petruška	2	(1988, 1989)
(Czechoslovakia) - (Slovakia) Štefan Svitek	2	(1988, 1989)
(Czechoslovakia) - (Slovakia) Jozef Michalko	2	(1988, 1990)
(Czechoslovakia) Vladimír Vyoral	2	(1989, 1990)
(Czechoslovakia) Michal Ježdík	2	(1990, 1992)
(Czechoslovakia) Václav Hrubý	2	(1990, 1992)

== Czech Republic Player of the Year (1992–present) ==
The award for the best men's basketball player of the year, with Czech Republic citizenship, from 1992 to the present.

Year	Czech Republic Player of the Year (1992–present)
Year	Player
1992	Jan Svoboda (2)
1993	none selected
1994	Jan Svoboda (3)
1995	Josef Jelínek (2)
1996	Jan Svoboda (4)
1997	Petr Czudek
1998	Jiří Okáč
1999	none selected
2000	Jiří Welsch
2001	Václav Hrubý
2002	none selected
2003	Jiří Welsch (2)
2004	none selected
2005	Jiří Welsch (3)
2006	Jiří Welsch (4)
2007	none selected
2008	none selected
2009	none selected
2010	none selected
2011	none selected
2012	Jan Veselý
2013	Tomáš Satoranský
2014	Tomáš Satoranský (2)
2015	Tomáš Satoranský (3)
2016	Jan Veselý (2)
2017	Jan Veselý (3)
2018	Tomáš Satoranský (4)
2019	Tomáš Satoranský (5)
2020	Tomáš Satoranský (6)
2021	Tomáš Satoranský (7)
2022	Jan Veselý (4)
2023	Tomáš Satoranský (8)
2024	Jan Veselý (5)

== See also ==
- Slovak Player of the Year

== Sources ==
- Pavel Šimák: Historie československého basketbalu v číslech (1932–1985), Basketbalový svaz ÚV ČSTV, květen 1985, 174 stran (in Czech)
- Pavel Šimák: Historie československého basketbalu v číslech, II. část (1985–1992), Česká a slovenská basketbalová federace, březen 1993, 130 stran (in Czech)
- Juraj Gacík: Kronika československého a slovenského basketbalu (1919–1993), (1993–2000), vydáno 2000, 1. vyd, slovensky, BADEM, Žilina, 943 stran (in Czech)
- Jakub Bažant, Jiří Závozda: Nebáli se své odvahy, Československý basketbal v příbězích a faktech, 1. díl (1897–1993), 2014, Olympia, 464 stran (in Czech)
