= Stanislav Kropilák =

Slovak basketball player (1955–2022)

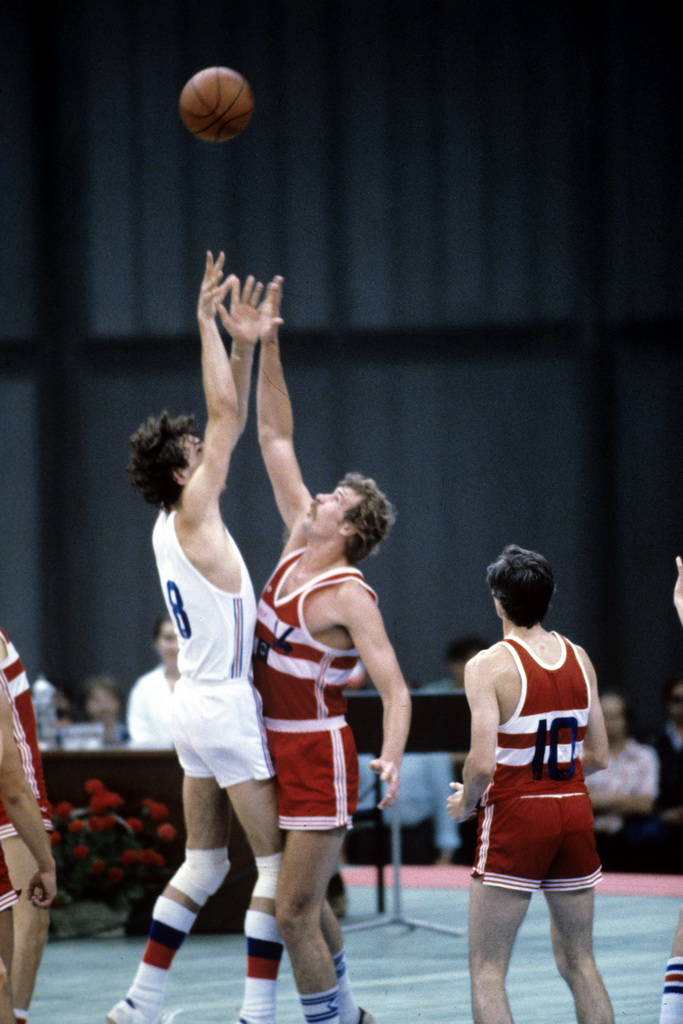
- Kropilák (#8 in white), at the 1980 Summer Olympics, versus the USSR.

Personal information
- Born: 10 June 1955 Kremnica, Czechoslovakia
- Died: 14 October 2022 (aged 67)
- Listed height: 6 ft 10 in (2.08 m)
- Listed weight: 215 lb (98 kg)

Career information
- Playing career: 1972–1996
- Position: Power forward / center

Career history
- 1972–1975: Slavia SVST Bratislava
- 1975–1983: Inter Bratislava
- 1983–1984: RH Pardubice
- 1984–1985: Inter Bratislava
- 1985–1989: CEP Fleurus
- 1989–1990: Spirou Monceau
- 1990–1992: Amicale Steinsel
- 1992–1994: Avenire Namur Basket
- 1994–1996: Spirou Basket Gilly

Career highlights
- FIBA's 50 Greatest Players (1991); 4× FIBA European Selection (1981 2×, 1982, 1987); 5× Czechoslovak League champion (1979, 1980, 1983–1985); 5× Czechoslovak Player of the Year (1979, 1980, 1982, 1983, 1985); 10× Czechoslovak League All-Star Five (1976–1985); 10× Slovak Player of the Year (1975–1984); Best Slovak Player of the 20th Century (2000)
- FIBA Hall of Fame
Medals
Men's basketball
Representing Czechoslovakia
EuroBasket
Silver medal – second place	1985 West Germany
Bronze medal – third place	1977 Belgium
Bronze medal – third place	1981 Czechoslovakia

Stanislav Kropilák (10 June 1955 – 14 October 2022) was a Slovak basketball player. At a height of 6 ft 10 in (2.08 m), he was a power forward-center. He is considered to be one of the best European players of his generation. Kropilák was named one of FIBA's 50 Greatest Players in 1991. His nickname as a player was Kily.

== Professional career ==
In his club career, Kropilák won five Czechoslovak Basketball League championships (1979, 1980, 1983, 1984, 1985). He was named to the Czechoslovak League All-Star Five ten times (1976–1985). He was also named to the FIBA European Selection four times (twice in 1981, 1982, 1987).

== National team career ==
Kropilák competed for Czechoslovakia at the 1976 Summer Olympics and 1980 Summer Olympics. He helped to lead the senior Czechoslovak national team to a silver medal at the 1985 EuroBasket, and to bronze medals at the 1977 EuroBasket and the 1981 EuroBasket. He was also named to the 1983 EuroBasket's All-Tournament Team.

== Personal life and death ==
Kropilák died on 14 October 2022, at the age of 67.

== See also ==
- Czechoslovak Basketball League career stats leaders
