= Jaroslav Skála (basketball) =

Czech basketball player (born 1954)

Personal information
- Born: 27 May 1954 (age 72) Plzeň, Czechoslovakia
- Listed height: 7 ft 0.5 in (2.15 m)
- Listed weight: 216 lb (98 kg)

Career information
- Playing career: 1973–1993
- Position: Center

Career history
- 1973–1977: Sparta Praha
- 1977–1982: Slavia VŠ Praha
- 1982–1983: RH Pardubice
- 1983–1984: Slavia VŠ Praha
- 1984–1988: Chemosvit Svit
- 1988–1991: Csepel SC
- 1991–1992: Chemosvit Svit
- 1992–1993: Essox Lučenec

Career highlights
- 2× Czechoslovak League champion (1981, 1982); Hungarian National Championship champion (1989): Czechoslovak Player of the Year (1981); 6× Czechoslovak League All-Star Five (1981–1986)
Medals
Representing Czechoslovakia
Men's basketball
EuroBasket
| Silver medal – second place | 1985 West Germany |
| Bronze medal – third place | 1981 Czechoslovakia |

Jaroslav Skála (born 27 May 1954) is a Czech former basketball player.

== Professional career ==
During his club career, Skála was a two-time Czechoslovak League champion, in the years 1981 and 1982. He was also named the Czechoslovak Player of the Year, in 1981.

== National team career ==
With the senior Czechoslovak national team, Skála competed in the men's tournament at the 1980 Summer Olympics. With Czechoslovakia, he also won the bronze medal at the 1981 EuroBasket, and the silver medal at the 1985 EuroBasket.

== See also ==
- Czechoslovak Basketball League career stats leaders
