= Kamil Brabenec (ice hockey) =

Czech ice hockey player (born 1976)

- Born: 17 May 1976 (age 50) Brno, Czechoslovakia
- Height: 6 ft 1 in (185 cm)
- Weight: 183 lb (83 kg; 13 st 1 lb)
- Position: Left wing
- Shot: Left
- NHL draft: Undrafted
- Playing career: 1995–2022

Kamil Brabenec (born 17 May 1976) is a Czech former professional ice hockey player whose position was left wing.

Brabenec played for HKm Zvolen, HC Kometa Brno, HC České Budějovice, HC Keramika Plzeň, Luleå HF, HC Vsetín and HC Egna. He won a Slovak Extraliga with HKm Zvolen (2012–13) and a Czech Extraliga with HC Kometa Brno (2016–17). Active for over 20 years, his career ended after a spell with the reserves of Kometa Brno, his hometown team, in 2022.

His father Kamil Brabenec Sr. was an international basketball player for Czechoslovakia in the 1970s and 80s, and his sister Andrea Brabencová and daughter Kristýna Brabencová also played that sport at a high level. His son Jakub Brabenec is a hockey player who was drafted by NHL team Vegas Golden Knights in 2021.
