= Gustáv Hraška =

Slovak basketball player

Personal information
- Born: 5 January 1953 (age 73) Spišská Sobota, Czechoslovakia
- Listed height: 6 ft 1.75 in (1.87 m)
- Listed weight: 180 lb (82 kg)

Career information
- Playing career: 1970–1989
- Position: Point guard

Career history
- 1970–1971: Iskra Svit
- 1971–1983: Slavia VŠ Praha
- 1984–1987: Iskra Svit
- 1987–1989: Slavia VŠ Praha

Career highlights
- 4× Czechoslovak League champion (1972, 1974, 1981, 1982); 5× Czechoslovak League All-Star Five (1979–1983); Czechoslovak 20th Century Team (2001)
Medals
Representing Czechoslovakia
Men's basketball
EuroBasket
Bronze medal – third place	1977 Belgium
Bronze medal – third place	1981 Czechoslovakia

Gustáv Hraška (born 5 January 1953) is a Slovak former basketball player. He was voted to the Czechoslovak 20th Century Team in 2001.

== Career ==
During his club career, Hraška won four Czechoslovak League championships, in the years 1972, 1974, 1981, and 1982.

With the senior Czechoslovakia national team, Hraška competed in the men's tournament at the 1976 Summer Olympics and the 1980 Summer Olympics. With Czechoslovakia, he also won the bronze medal at the 1977 EuroBasket, and the bronze medal at the 1981 EuroBasket.

== See also ==
- Czechoslovak Basketball League career stats leaders
