= Zdeněk Bobrovský =

Czech basketball player

Personal information
- Born: 1 December 1933 Rosice, Czechoslovakia
- Died: 21 November 2014 (aged 80)

Career highlights
- Czechoslovak 20th Century Team (2001)

Zdeněk Bobrovský (1 December 1933 – 21 November 2014) was a Czech basketball player. He was voted to the Czechoslovak 20th Century Team.

== National team career ==
With the senior Czechoslovak national team, Bobrovský competed in the men's tournament at the 1952 Summer Olympics and the 1960 Summer Olympics. With Czechoslovakia, he also won silver medals at the 1951 EuroBasket and the 1955 EuroBasket, and the bronze medal at the 1957 EuroBasket.
