= Justin Sedlák =

Slovak basketball player

Personal information
- Nationality: Slovak
- Born: 14 January 1955 (age 70); Hoste, Czechoslovakia

Sport
- Sport: Basketball

Justin Sedlák (born 14 January 1955) is a Slovak basketball player. He competed in the men's tournament at the 1976 Summer Olympics.
