= Slovak Basketball Player of the Year =

Slovak basketball award

The Slovak Basketball Player of the Year is the annual award for the best men's and women's Slovak basketball player. It is awarded by the Slovak Basketball Association.

Below is a list of the winners of the award.

Year	Slovak Player of the Year	
Year	Male	Female
1971	not awarded	Eva Petrovičová
1972	Marian Kotleba	Eva Petrovičová
1973	Ivan Chrenka	Eva Petrovičová
1974	Peter Chrenka	Božena Miklošovičová
1975	Stanislav Kropilák	Yvetta Polláková
1976	Stanislav Kropilák	Božena Miklošovičová
1977	Stanislav Kropilák	Božena Miklošovičová
1978	Stanislav Kropilák	Eva Piršelová
1979	Stanislav Kropilák	Irena Rajniaková
1980	Stanislav Kropilák	Irena Rajniaková
1981	Stanislav Kropilák	Beata Renertová
1982	Stanislav Kropilák	Zora Brziaková
1983	Stanislav Kropilák	Alena Kašová
1984	Stanislav Kropilák	Alena Kašová
1985	Juraj Žuffa	Irena Rajniaková
1986	Juraj Žuffa	Erika Dobrovičová
1987	Oto Matický	Anna Janoštinová
1988	Oto Matický	Anna Janoštinová
1989	Oto Matický	Erika Dobrovičová
1990	Jozef Michalko	Iveta Bieliková
1991	not awarded	
1992	not awarded	
1993	not awarded	
1994	Oto Matický	Erika Dobrovičová
1995	Oto Matický	Andrea Kuklová
1996	Oto Matický	Iveta Bieliková
1997	Marek Andruška	Anna Kotočová
1998	Richard Petruška	Andrea Kuklová
1999	Richard Petruška	Alena Kováčová
2000	Richard Petruška	Anna Kotočová
2001	Martin Rančík	Alena Kováčová
2002	Martin Rančík	Alena Kováčová
2003	Štefan Svitek	Zuzana Žirková
2004	not awarded	
2005	Anton Gavel	Zuzana Žirková
2006	not awarded	
2007	Radoslav Rančík	Zuzana Žirková
2008	Radoslav Rančík	Zuzana Žirková
2009	Radoslav Rančík	Zuzana Žirková
2010	Anton Gavel	Zuzana Žirková
2011	Anton Gavel	Lucia Kupčíková
2012	Anton Gavel	Lucia Kupčíková
2013	Radoslav Rančík	Lucia Kupčíková
2014	Radoslav Rančík	Zuzana Žirková
2015	Radoslav Rančík	Zuzana Žirková
2016	Radoslav Rančík	Žofia Hruščáková
2017	Radoslav Rančík	Žofia Hruščáková
2018	Kyle Kuric	Barbora Wrzesiński
2019	Vladimír Brodziansky	Barbora Wrzesiński
2020	Vladimír Brodziansky	Barbora Wrzesiński
2021	Vladimír Brodziansky	Barbora Wrzesiński
2022	Vladimír Brodziansky	Terézia Páleníková
2023	Vladimír Brodziansky	Terézia Páleníková
2024	Vladimír Brodziansky	Terézia Páleníková
2025	Vladimír Brodziansky	Terézia Páleníková

== See also ==
- Czech Player of the Year
