= Pavol Bojanovský =

Slovak basketball player (born 1953)

Personal information
- Nationality: Slovak
- Born: 6 September 1953 (age 71); Bratislava, Czechoslovakia

Sport
- Sport: Basketball

Pavol Bojanovský (born 6 September 1953) is a Slovak basketball player. He competed in the men's tournament at the 1980 Summer Olympics.
