= Jiří Pospíšil (basketball) =

Czech basketball player (1950–2019)

Personal information
- Born: 9 September 1950 Brno, Czechoslovakia
- Died: 13 June 2019 (aged 68)

Career highlights
- 8× Czechoslovak League All-Star Five (1971, 1973–1975, 1977–1980); Czechoslovak 20th Century Team (2001)
Medals
Representing Czechoslovakia
Men's basketball
EuroBasket
Bronze medal – third place	1977 Belgium

Jiří "Áda" Pospíšil (9 September 1950 – 13 June 2019) was a Czech basketball player. He was voted to the Czechoslovak 20th Century Team.

== National team career ==
Pospíšil competed with the senior Czechoslovak national team in the men's tournament at the 1972, 1976, and 1980 Summer Olympics. He died on 13 June 2019 at age 68. With Czechoslovakia, he also won the bronze medal at the 1977 EuroBasket.

== See also ==
- Czechoslovak Basketball League career stats leaders
