= Kamil Brabenec (basketball) =

Czech basketball player (born 1951)

Personal information
- Born: 4 February 1951 (age 75) Znojmo, Czechoslovakia
- Listed height: 1.93 m (6 ft 4 in)
- Listed weight: 82 kg (181 lb)

Career information
- Playing career: 1970–1988
- Position: Shooting guard / small forward

Career history
- 1970–1972: Pardubice
- 1972–1982: Brno
- 1982–1983: Baník Handlová
- 1983–1988: Brno

Career highlights
- As player: 2× FIBA European Selection (1977, 1978); 6× Czechoslovak League champion (1976–1978, 1986–1988); Czechoslovak Player of the Year (1976); 11× Czechoslovak League All-Star Five (1974–1981, 1984, 1986, 1987); 101 Greats of European Basketball (2018)
Medals
Men's basketball
Representing Czechoslovakia
FIBA EuroBasket
Silver medal – second place	1985 West Germany
Bronze medal – third place	1977 Belgium
Bronze medal – third place	1981 Czechoslovakia

Kamil Brabenec (born 4 February 1951) is a Czech retired professional basketball player and coach. At 1.93 m (6 ft 4 in) tall, he was a small forward. He was voted to the Czechoslovak 20th Century Team. In 2018, he was named one of the 101 Greats of European Basketball.

== Life ==
Kamil Brabenec was born on 4 February 1951 in Znojmo. He then lived in Jihlava until 1961, and then his family moved to Ústí nad Labem. He graduated from a chemical apprenticeship. From the end of the primary school, he played basketball. When he was 19, he went to his military service in Pardubice, where he played for Rudá hvězda Pardubice in the top Czechoslovak tier. After the Summer Olympics in 1972, he moved to Brno, where he has lived ever since.

== Playing career ==
=== Club career ===
During his club career, Brabenec was a FIBA European Selection, in 1977 and 1978. He won 6 Czechoslovak League championships, in the years 1976, 1977, 1978, 1986, 1987, and 1988. He was also the league's second all-time scorer, with 10,726 points scored.

=== National team career ===
Brabenec helped to lead the senior Czechoslovakia national team to a EuroBasket silver medal, at the 1985 EuroBasket, as well as to two EuroBasket bronze medals, in 1977, and 1981. He was also the leading scorer of the 1978 FIBA World Championship, with a scoring average of 26.9 points per game.

== Coaching career ==
After his playing career, Brabenec worked as a basketball coach.

== Family ==
His daughter Andrea Brabencová and granddaughter Kristýna Brabencová also played basketball at a high level. His son, also named Kamil, and grandson Jakub played ice hockey professionally.

== See also ==
- List of the best Czech basketball players of the 20th century
- Czechoslovak Basketball League career stats leaders
