= Vojtěch Petr =

Czech basketball player

Personal information
- Born: 4 October 1955 Brno, Czechoslovakia
- Died: 12 April 2012 (aged 56) Ostrava

Career highlights
- Czechoslovak League All-Star Five (1976)

Vojtěch Petr (4 October 1955 – 8 April 2012) was a Czech basketball player. He competed in the men's tournament at the 1976 Summer Olympics.

== See also ==
- Czechoslovak Basketball League career stats leaders
