= Peter Rajniak =

Slovak basketball player

Personal information
- Born: 25 May 1953 Palúdzka (now part of Liptovský Mikuláš), Czechoslovakia
- Died: 4 February 2000 (aged 46) Luxembourg

Career highlights
- Czechoslovak League All-Star Five (1985)

Peter Rajniak (25 May 1953 – 4 February 2000) was a Slovak basketball player. He competed in the men's tournament at the 1980 Summer Olympics.

== See also ==
- Czechoslovak Basketball League career stats leaders
