= Dukla Olomouc (basketball) =

Former professional basketball club in Olomouc, Czech Republic

Dukla Olomouc was a professional basketball club based in Olomouc, the historical capital city of Moravia. The team was the basketball department of the military multi-sport club VTJ Dukla Olomouc. Established in 1961, the club became part of Czechoslovakia's state-supported sports system. The club quickly rose in prominence, debuting in the Czechoslovak basketball league in 1962.

== Honours ==
Total Titles: 2

=== Domestic competitions ===
- Czechoslovak Championship
  - Winners (2): 1973, 1975
