= Pecháček =

Czech surname

Pecháček (feminine: Pecháčková) is a Czech surname. According to the most likely theories, it was derived either from the given name Petr, or from the German word Pech, which has two main meanings: 'bad luck' (which would mean that the surname originated as a term for a person afflicted with bad luck), as well as 'resin' (which would mean that it is an occupational surname originated as a term for a person working with resin). Similar names with the same origin theories are e.g. Pech, Pecha and Pechanec.

Notable people with the surname include:

- Adam Pecháček (born 1995), Czech basketball player
- František Pecháček (1896–1944), Czech gymnast
- František Martin Pecháček (1763–1816), Czech violinist and pedagogue
- Františka Pecháčková (1904–1991), Czech / Moravian writer
- Franz Pecháček (1793–1840), Austrian-German violin virtuoso and composer
- Jiří Pecháček (born 1943), Czech equestrian
- Judit Bárdos, married Pecháček (born 1988), Slovak actress
- Ludmila Pecháčková
- Václav Pěcháček
