= Matzleinsdorf Protestant Cemetery =

Protestant cemetery in Vienna, Austria

Coordinates: 48°10′42″N 16°21′37″E

Matzleinsdorf Evangelical Protestant cemetery
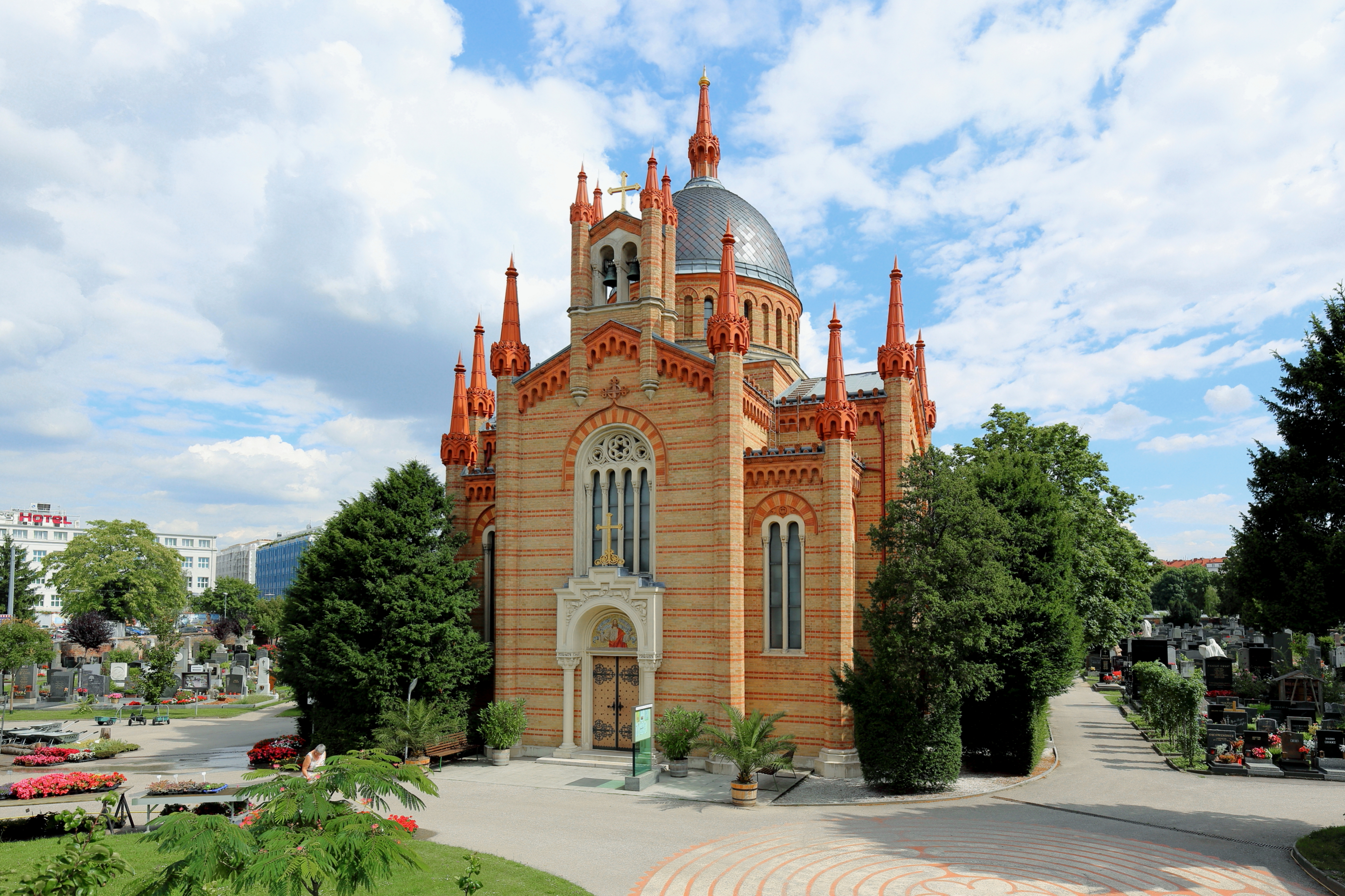
- The Cemetery chapel Christuskirche
- Interactive map of Matzleinsdorf Evangelical Protestant cemetery

Details
- Established: 1858
- Location: Vienna
- Country: Austria
- Type: Protestant cemetery
- No. of interments: 21,000+
- Website: Official website
- Find a Grave: Matzleinsdorf Evangelical Protestant cemetery

Matzleinsdorf Protestant Cemetery (German: Evangelischer Friedhof Matzleinsdorf) is a historic church-owned and operated Protestant cemetery located in the Favoriten district of Vienna, the capital city of Austria.

== History and details ==
Throughout the centuries, the Vienna Protestants did not have their own graveyard but were buried among Catholics in Catholic cemeteries. In May 1856 Emperor Franz Joseph I of Austria agreed to reformations which allowed for the creation of cemeteries of other denominations.

The Protestant church acquired a plot of land at the outlying village of Matzleinsdorf that same year and began the construction of their first cemetery in Vienna. The original plans included a chapel, a home for undertakers, a mortuary and various storage facilities. The famous Austrian architect Theophil Hansen was contracted for the project. However the construction of the cemetery would take two years as the Protestant church ran out of money and needed to finance construction through donations. Matzleinsdorf Protestant Cemetery was finally inaugurated by the leaders of two Protestant denominations on May 7, 1858. Theophil Hansen, the designer of the cemetery, presented the keys of cemetery gates to the leaders of the two respective ecclesiastical officials. Superintendent of the Calvinist H.B (Evangelische Kirche Helvetisches Bekenntnis) Gottfried Franz gave the blessing speech, while the Lutheran A.B (Evangelische Kirche Augsburger Bekenntnis) Superintendent Ernst Pauer performed the consecration of the burial ground, and on September 27, 1860 the chapel Christuskirche (Chapel of the Holy Christ) was completed and consecrated.

The Chapel has a distinct architectural style which is reminiscent of an Eastern Orthodox Church. The architect, Theophil Hansen, was influenced heavily by historical features prominent during the 19th century and constructed the church in a Byzantium style with a large dome and crowned corner pillars. The entrance has a golden mosaic that shows Jesus Christ holding a holy scroll. The interior of the chapel is characterized by 35 statues of angels made in a style similar to figureheads of Spanish galleons. They symbolize worship, dogma and annunciation. The ornate stained glass windows are ornamented with Christian symbols, depicting the nativity, crucifixion and resurrection of the Christ.

During its long history, the Matzleinsdorf cemetery became so popular among the Viennese Protestants that it needed to be enlarged twice due to a lack of space. However, when the Zentralfriedhof got its own Protestant section, the Matzleinsdorf fell into disuse and discussion about its retention embarked and lasts ever since. Finally, in 1943 the cemetery suffered heavy destruction during Allied bombings due to its proximity to the Vienna Railway Station South, a primary target of the Allied forces. Today, it has been largely restored but still suffers from competition of the more popular Protestant Section at Zentralfriedhof.

== Selected notable burials ==
A few of the notables buried here are:

- Heinrich Anschütz (1785–1865), German actor
- Karl Isidor Beck (1817–1879), Austrian poet
- Count Friedrich Ferdinand von Beust (1809–1886), Austrian statesman
- Karl Ludwig von Bruck (1798–1860), Austrian statesman
- Ada Christen (1839–1901), Austrian writer
- Christine Enghaus (1815–1910), German actress
- Christian Friedrich Hebbel (1813–1863), German poet and dramatist
- Oskar Karlweis (1894–1956), Austrian actor
- Rudolf Koppitz (1884–1936), Austrian photographer
- Heinrich Laube (1806–1884), German dramatist, novelist and theatre-director
- Hermann Nothnagel (1841–1905), German internist
- František Martin Pecháček (1763–1816), Czech violinist and composer
- Adele Sandrock (1863–1937), German actress
- Lorenz von Stein (1815–1890), German economist, sociologist, and public administration scholar
- Hans Thirring (1888–1976), Austrian theoretical physicist, professor, and father of the physicist Walter Thirring
- Otto Weininger (1880–1903), Austrian philosopher

== Gallery ==
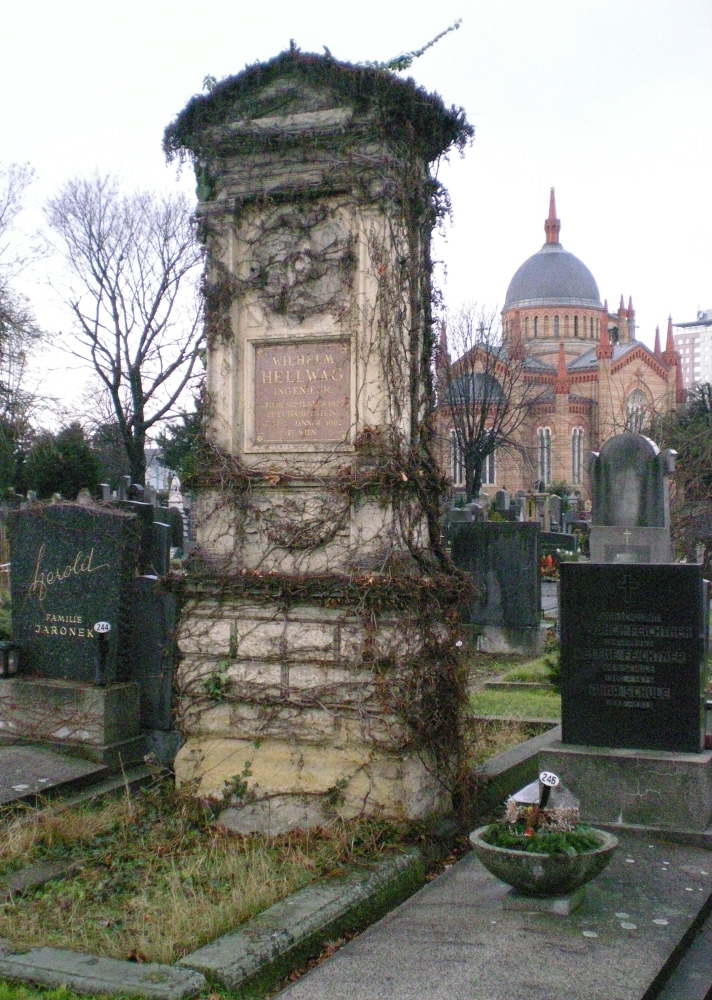
Matzleinsdorf Protestant Cemetery

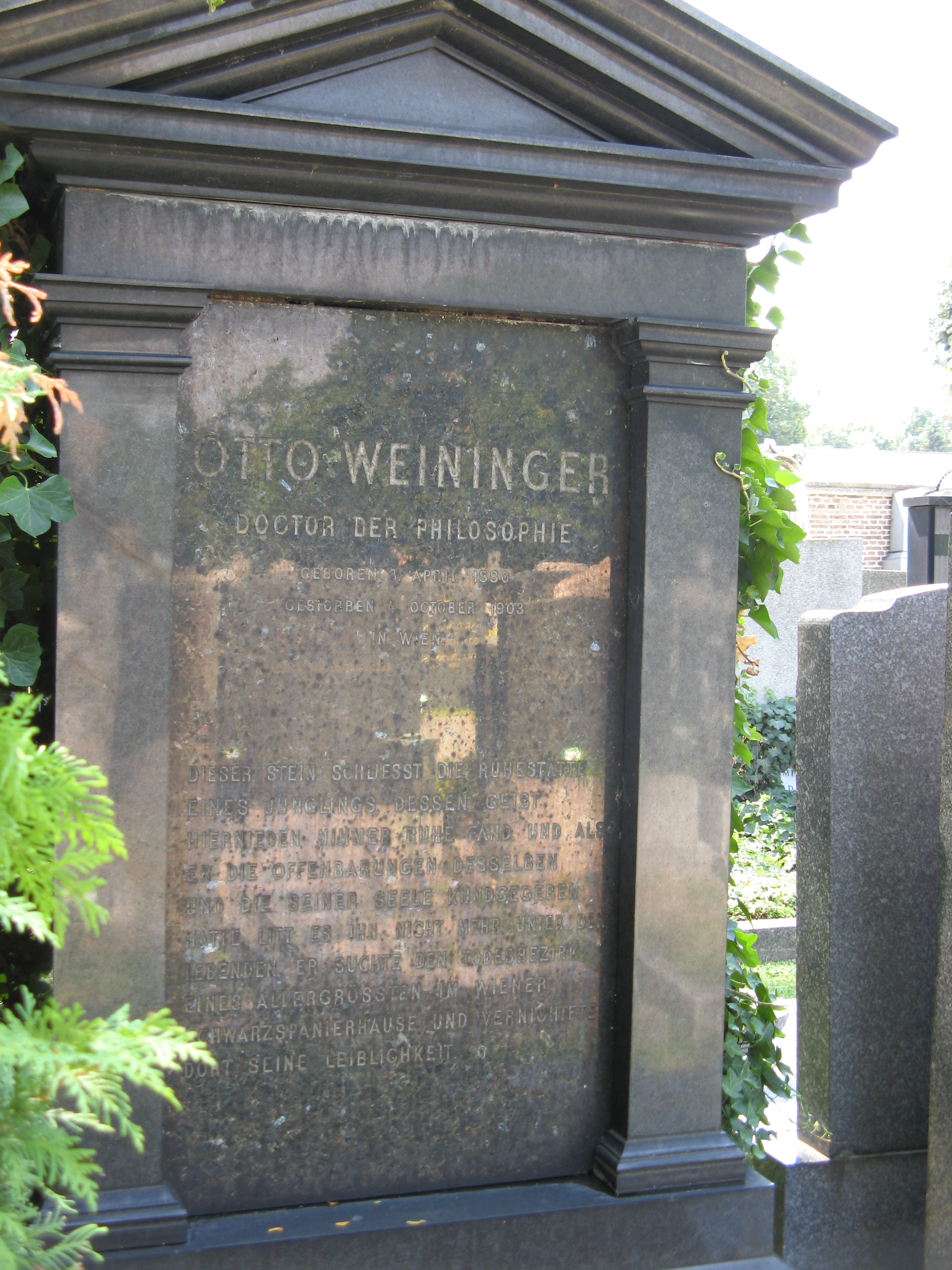
Grave of Otto Weininger

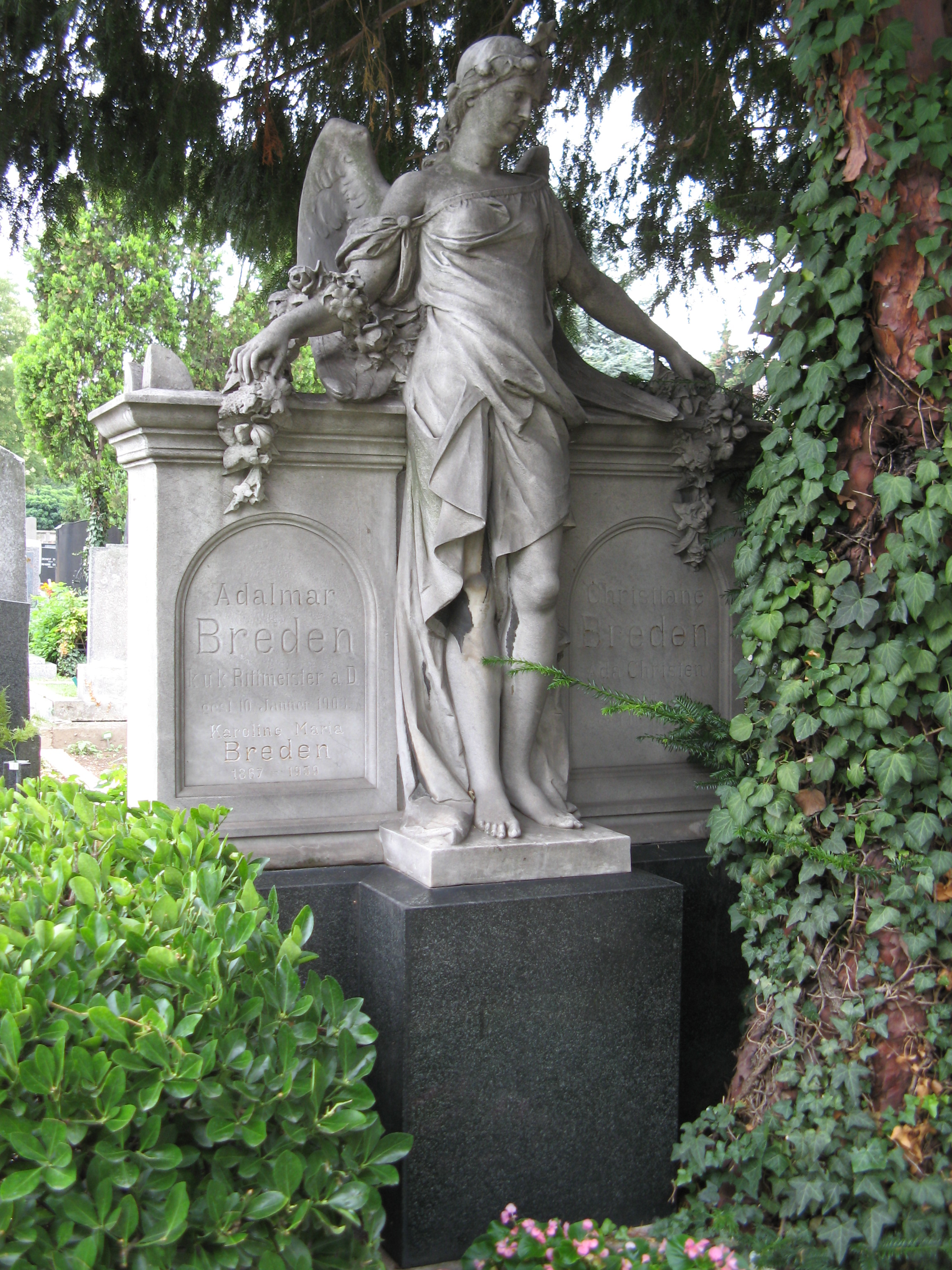
Grave of Ada Christen
