= Viktor Oskar Tilgner =

Austrian sculptor (1844–1896)

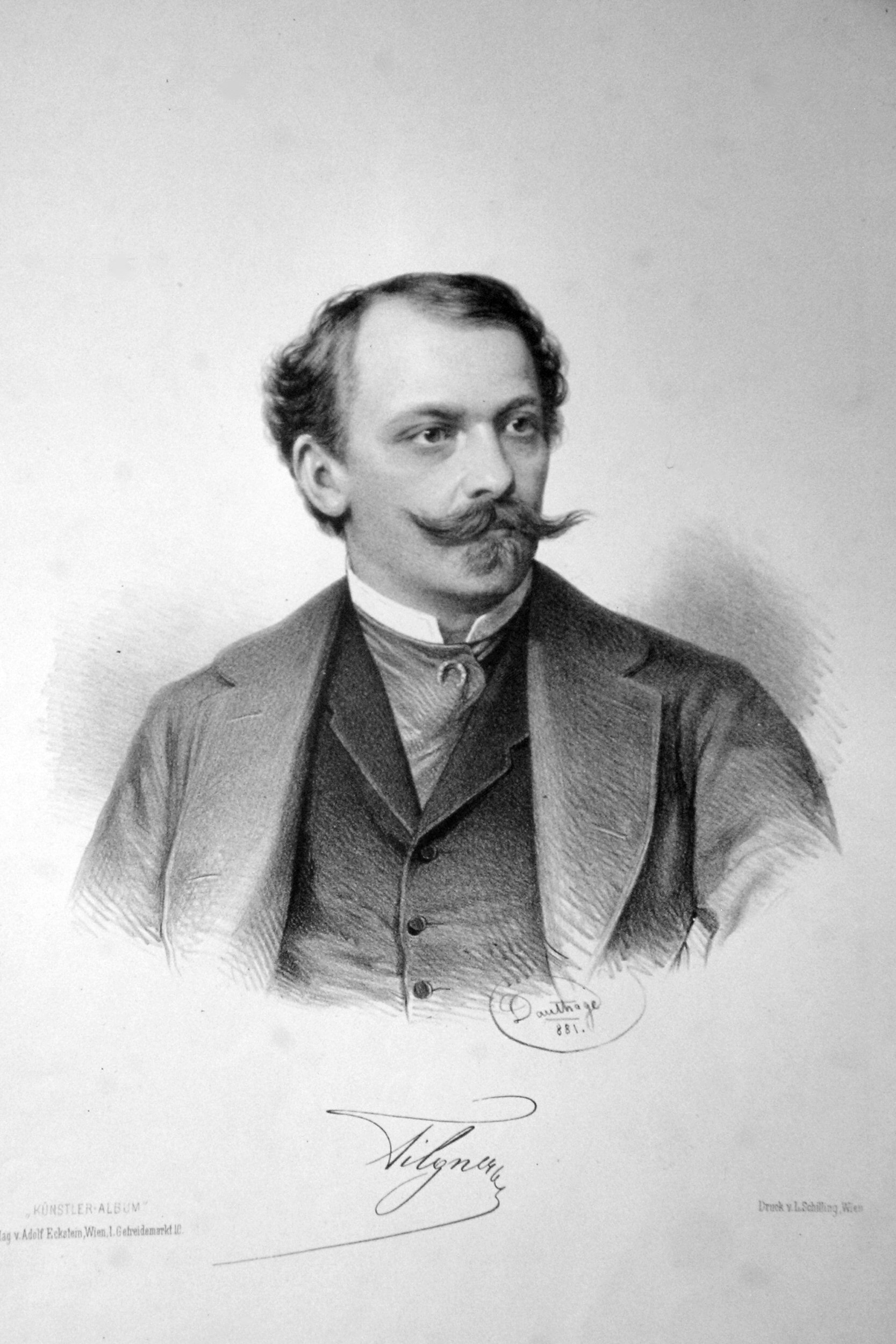
Viktor Tilgner, Lithograph by Adolf Dauthage (1881)

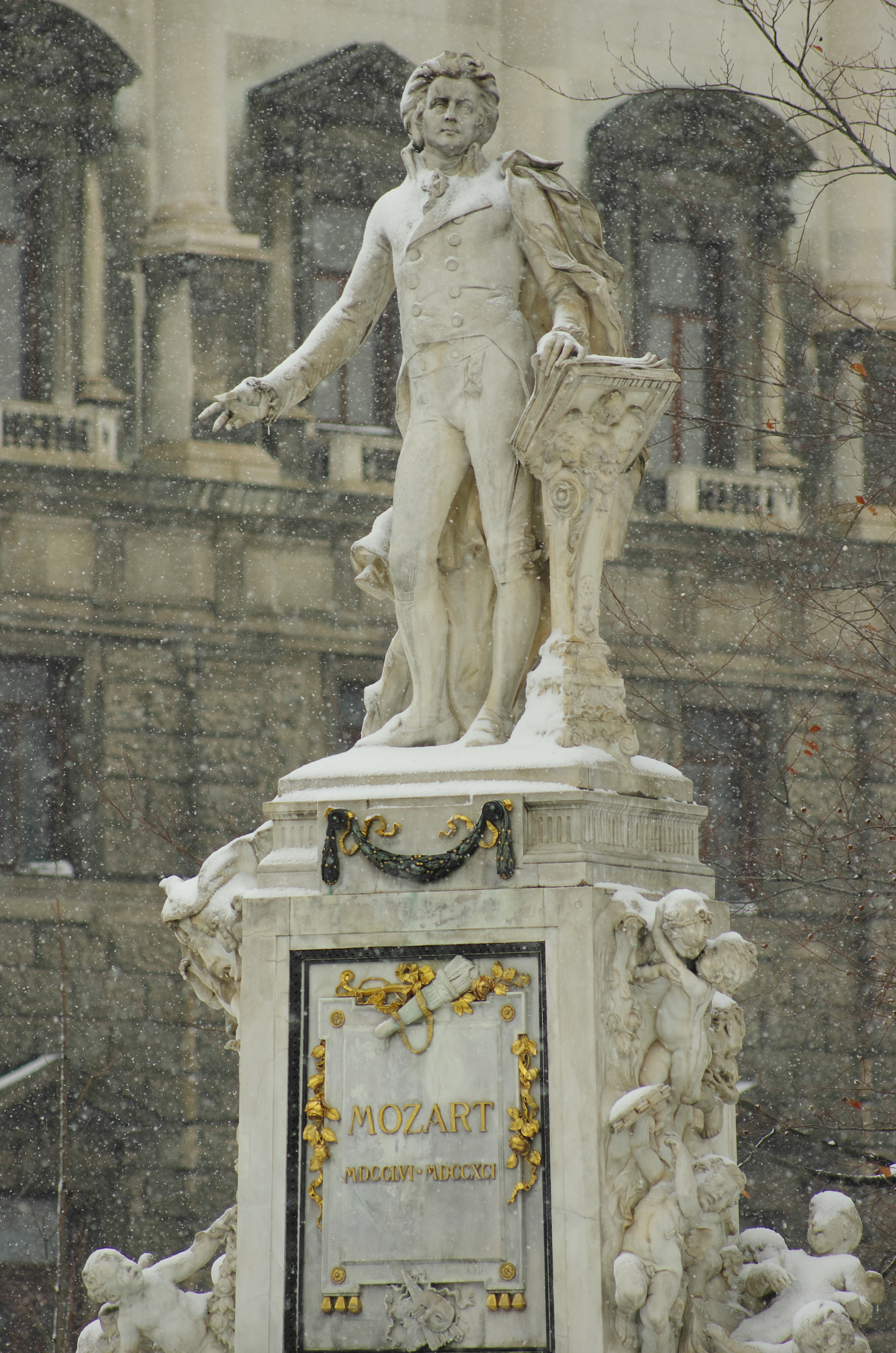
Mozart Monument

Viktor Oskar Tilgner (25 October 1844 in Pressburg – 16 April 1896 in Vienna) was an Austrian sculptor and medailleur.

== Life ==
Tilgner was born on 25 October 1844 in Pressburg. He was the son of Captain Carl Tilgner. The family moved to Vienna when he was a child. His talent was recognized early by the sculptor Franz Schönthaler, who became his first teacher. Then, at the Academy of Fine Arts, he studied under Franz Bauer and Josef Gasser. Later, he was attracted to engraving and worked with the medailleur Joseph Daniel Böhm. One of Tilgner's student's was German sculptor John Walz.

He belonged to the circle of artists around Count Karol Lanckoroński. During the World Exhibition of 1873, he met the French sculptor Gustave Deloye, who strongly influenced his work. The following year, he took a trip to Italy with Hans Makart, whose "realistic academicism" also influenced Tilgner's style. For the last twenty years of his life, he had a large studio in what was originally a greenhouse at the Palais Schwarzenberg.

Despite a long-standing heart condition and recurring chest pain, he spent a strenuous day working on his Mozart monument in Vienna, to get it ready on schedule. He died of a heart attack the next morning, on 16 April 1896. Often considered to be his greatest work, the monument was unveiled a few days after his death. The bulk of his estate was bequeathed to his hometown and is now on display at the Bratislava City Gallery.

== Selected major works ==
- Statue of Leopold V, Duke of Austria at the Heeresgeschichtliches Museum
- Statue of Peter Paul Rubens at the Künstlerhaus
- Statue of Peter Paul Rubens at the Telfair Academy of Arts and Sciences, Savannah, Georgia
- Statue of Raphael at the Telfair Academy of Arts and Sciences, Savannah, Georgia
- Statues at the Kunsthistorisches Museum: Christian Daniel Rauch, Peter von Cornelius and Moritz von Schwind.
- Statues at the Naturhistorisches Museum: Alexander von Humboldt, Leopold von Buch, Isaac Newton and Carl Linnaeus.
- Statues at the Austrian Parliament building: Archimedes, Marcus Terentius Varro, Homer and Phidias.
- Statues at the Telfair Academy building: Phidias, Raphael and Rembrandt
- Figures at the Burgtheater: Don Juan, Phaidra, Falstaff, Hanswurst, William Shakespeare, Pedro Calderón de la Barca, Molière, Gotthold Ephraim Lessing, Johann Wolfgang von Goethe, Friedrich Schiller, Friedrich Hebbel, Franz Grillparzer and Karl Felix Halm.
- Monument for Josef Werndl, Steyr
- Monument for Anton Bruckner in the Stadtpark. Due to vandalism, the female figure was removed and replaced with a simple pedestal.
- Monument for Johann Nepomuk Hummel, Bratislava
- Monument for Dr Johann Nepomuk Prix, Wiener Zentralfriedhof
- Monument for Franz Liszt, Ödenburg
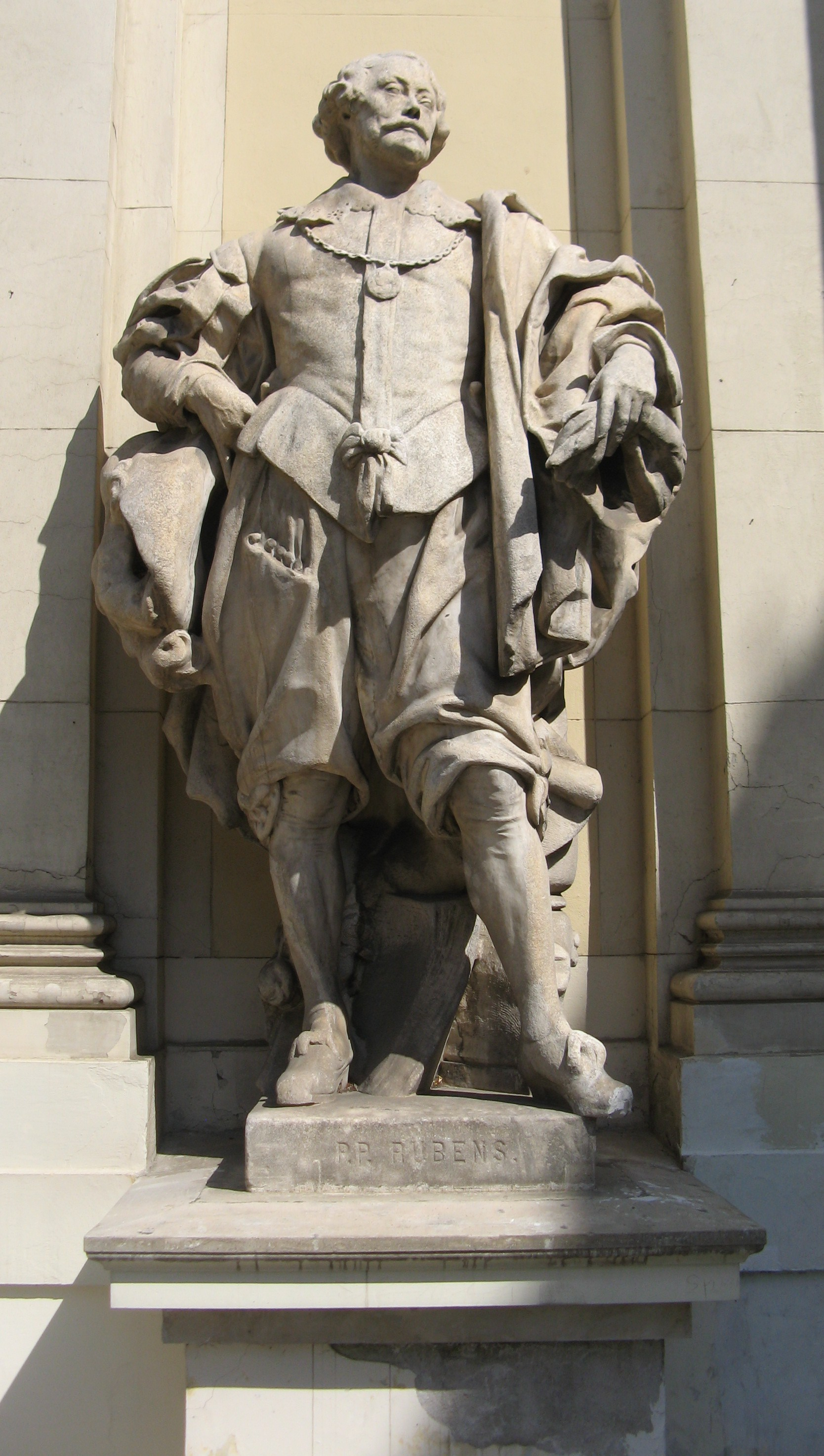
Peter Paul Rubens

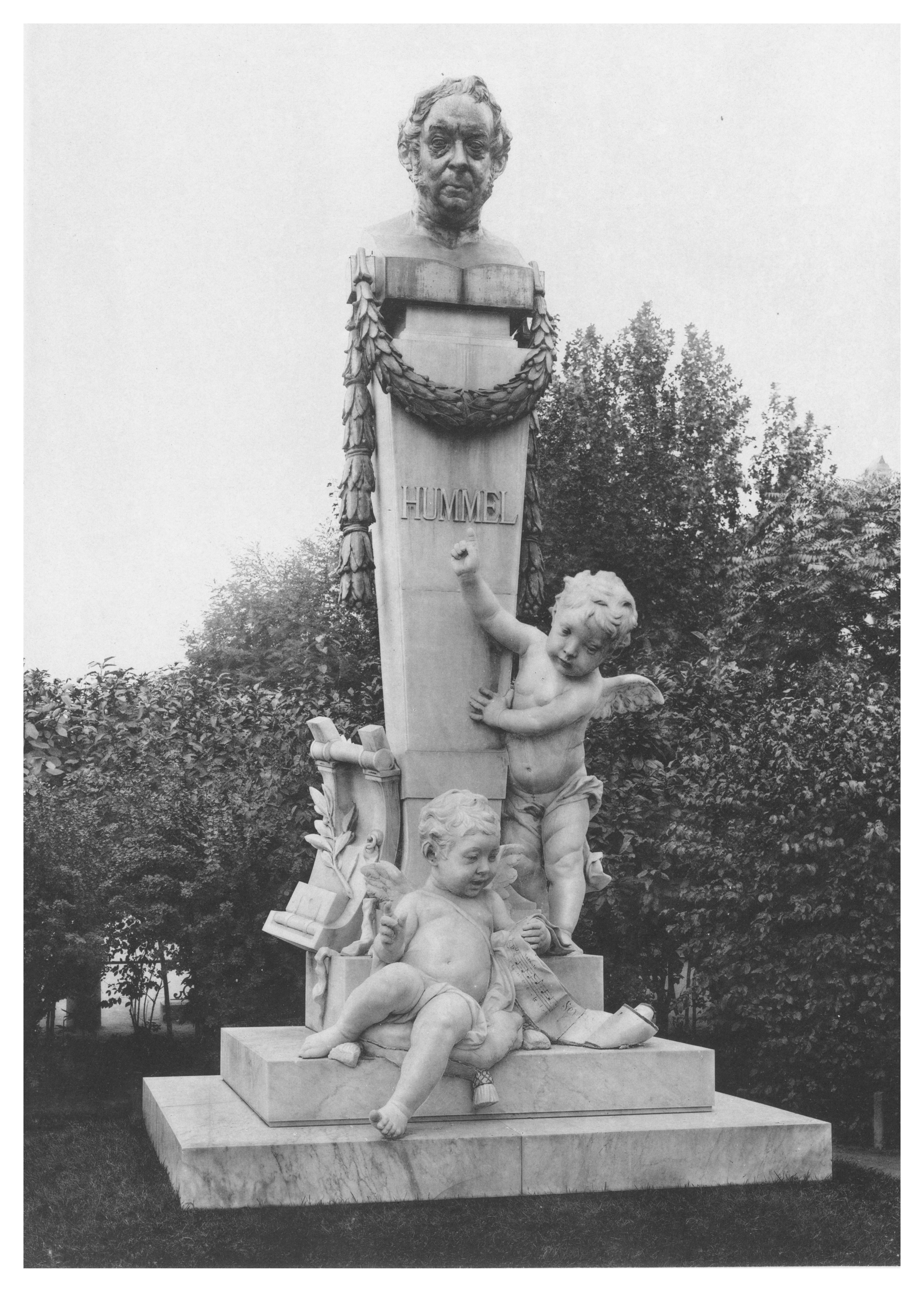
Hummel Monument

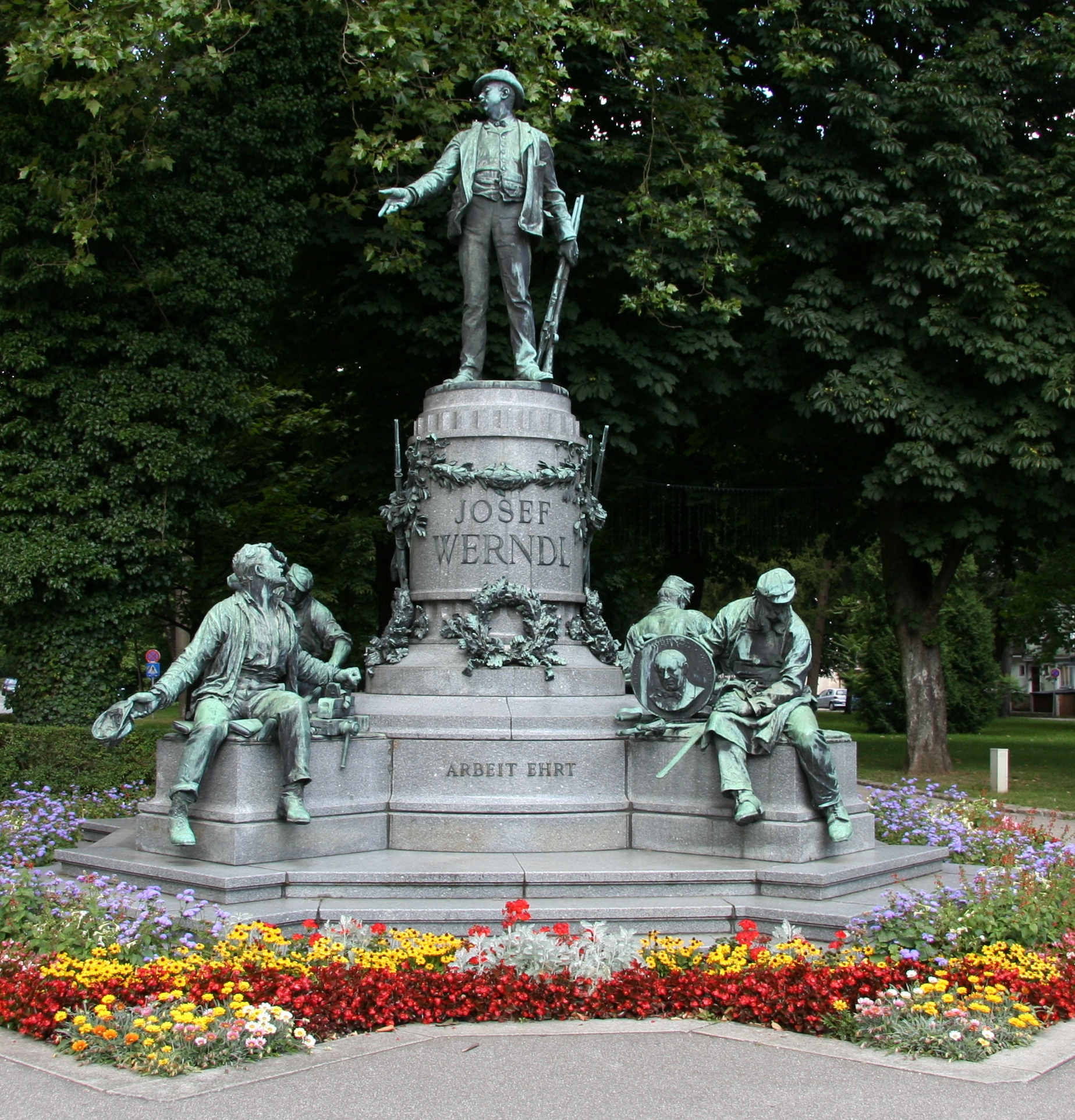
Werndl Monument

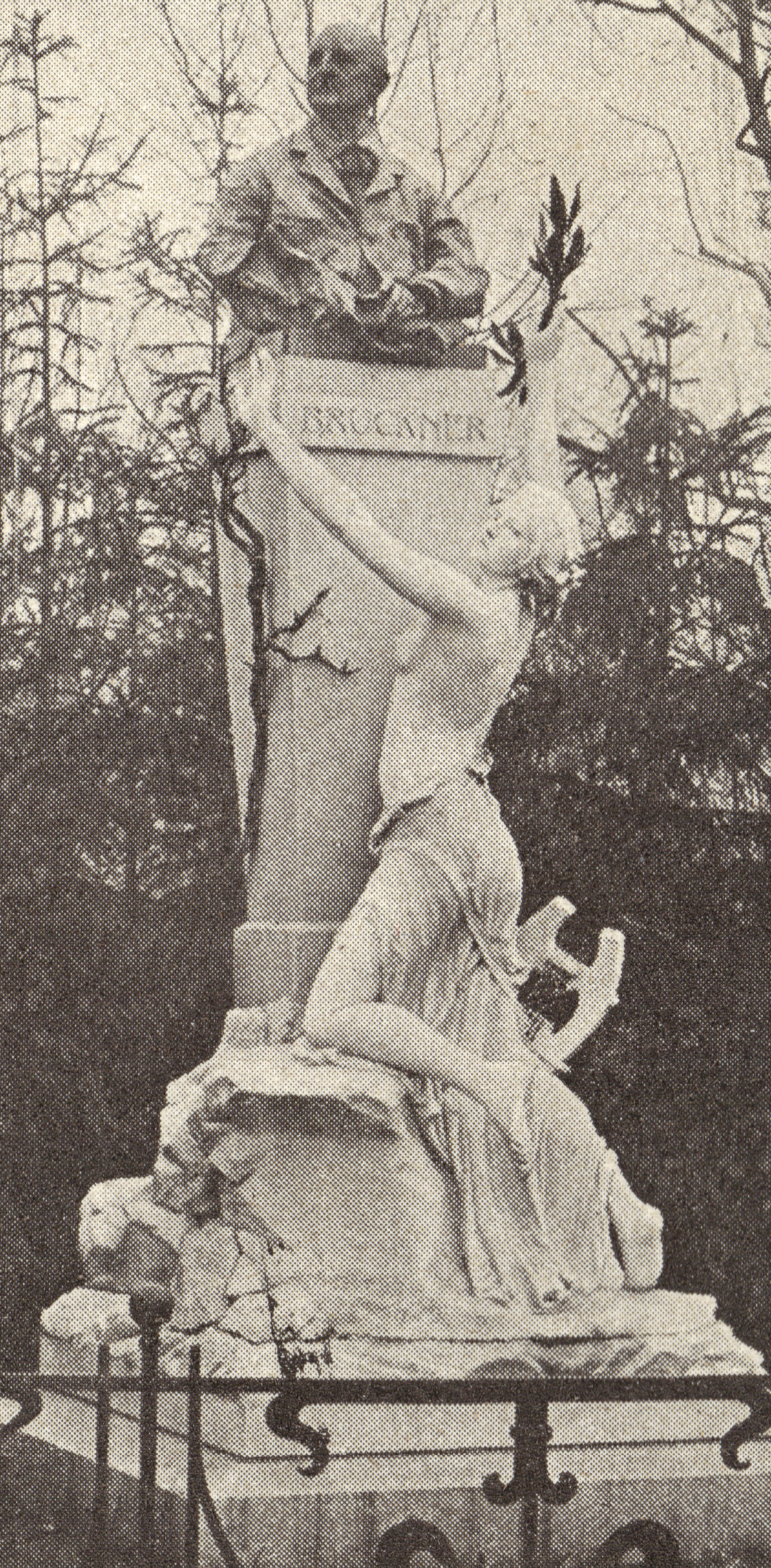
Bruckner Monument, original version

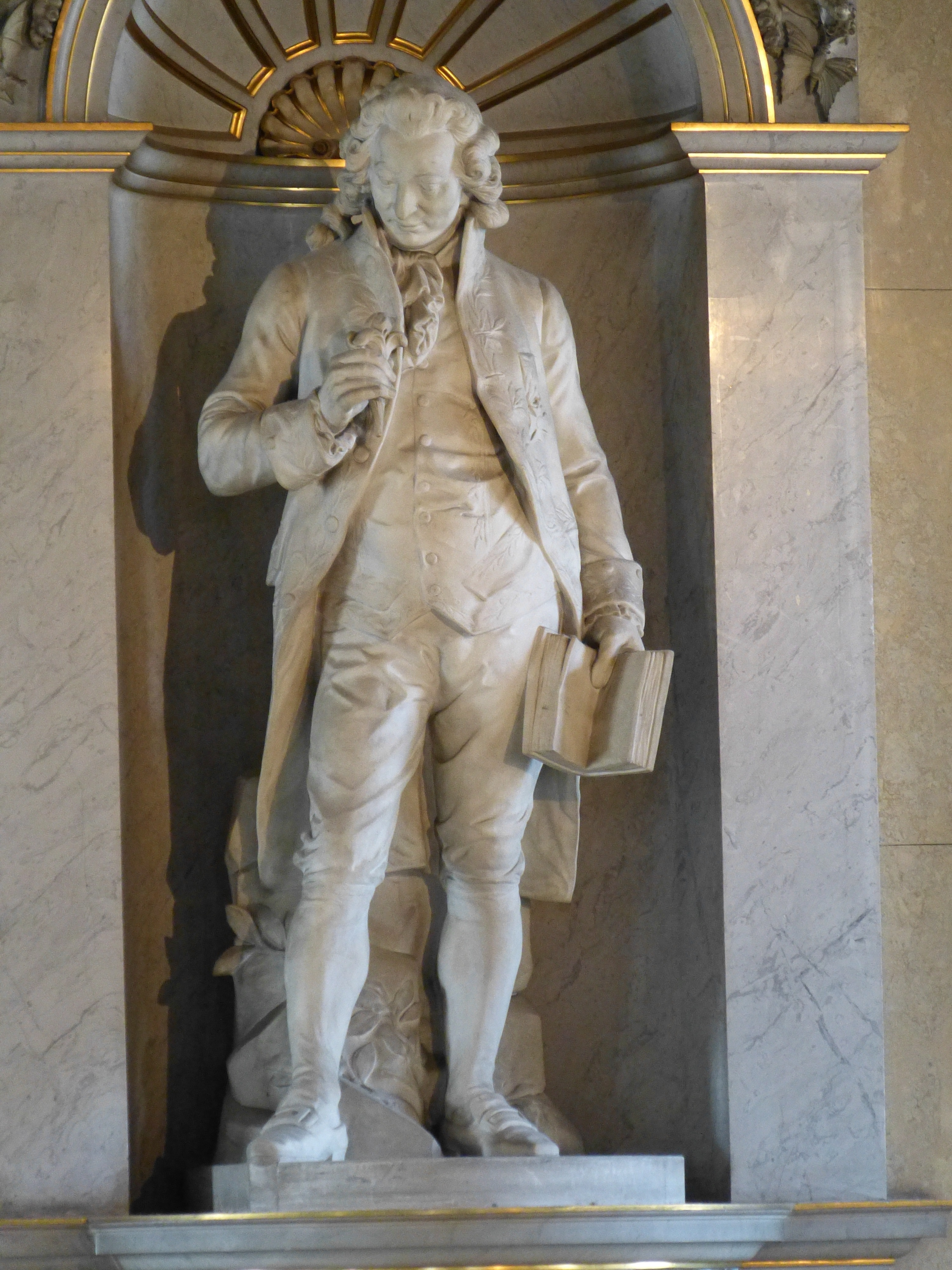
Carl Linnaeus

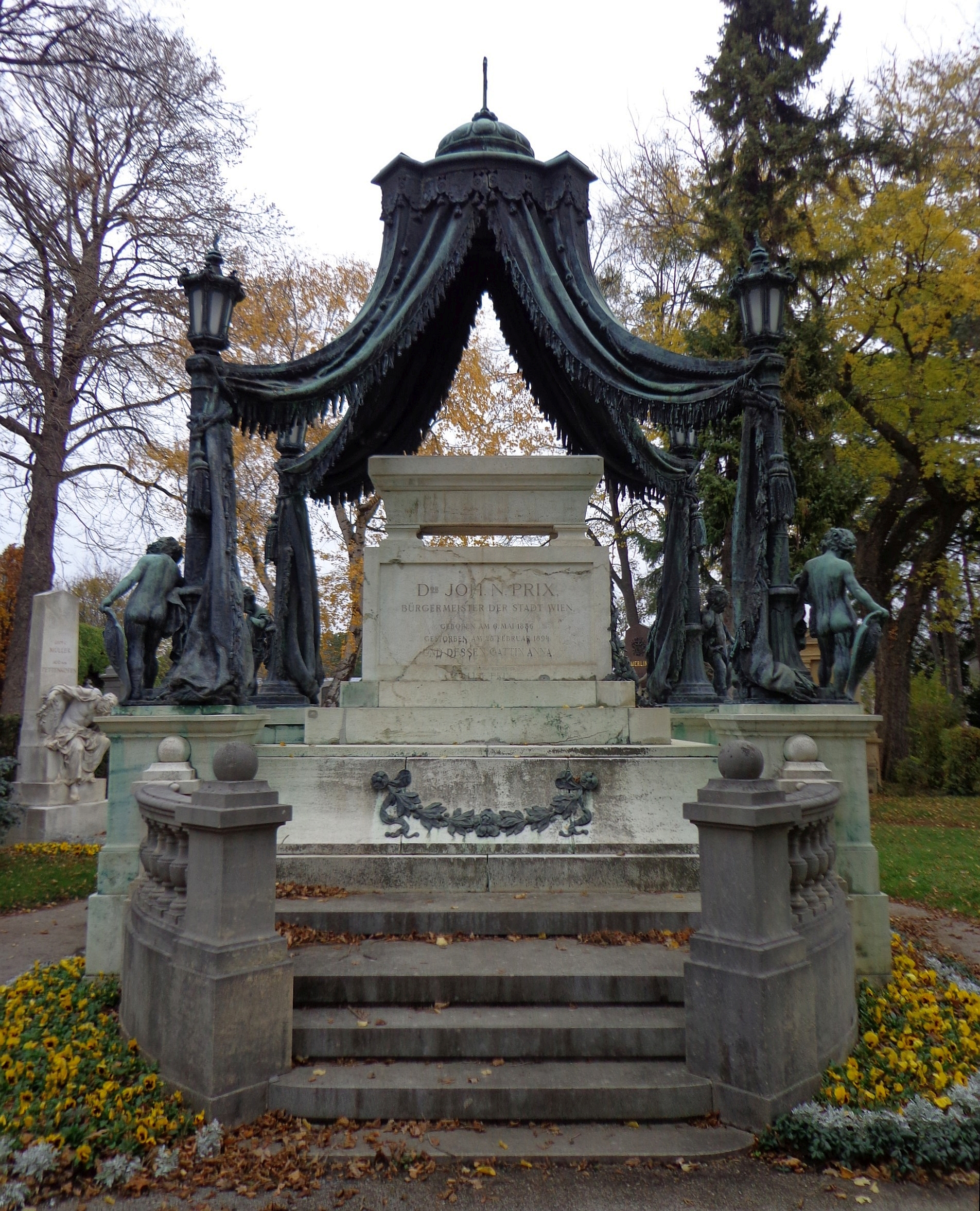
Dr Johann Nepomuk Prix Monument

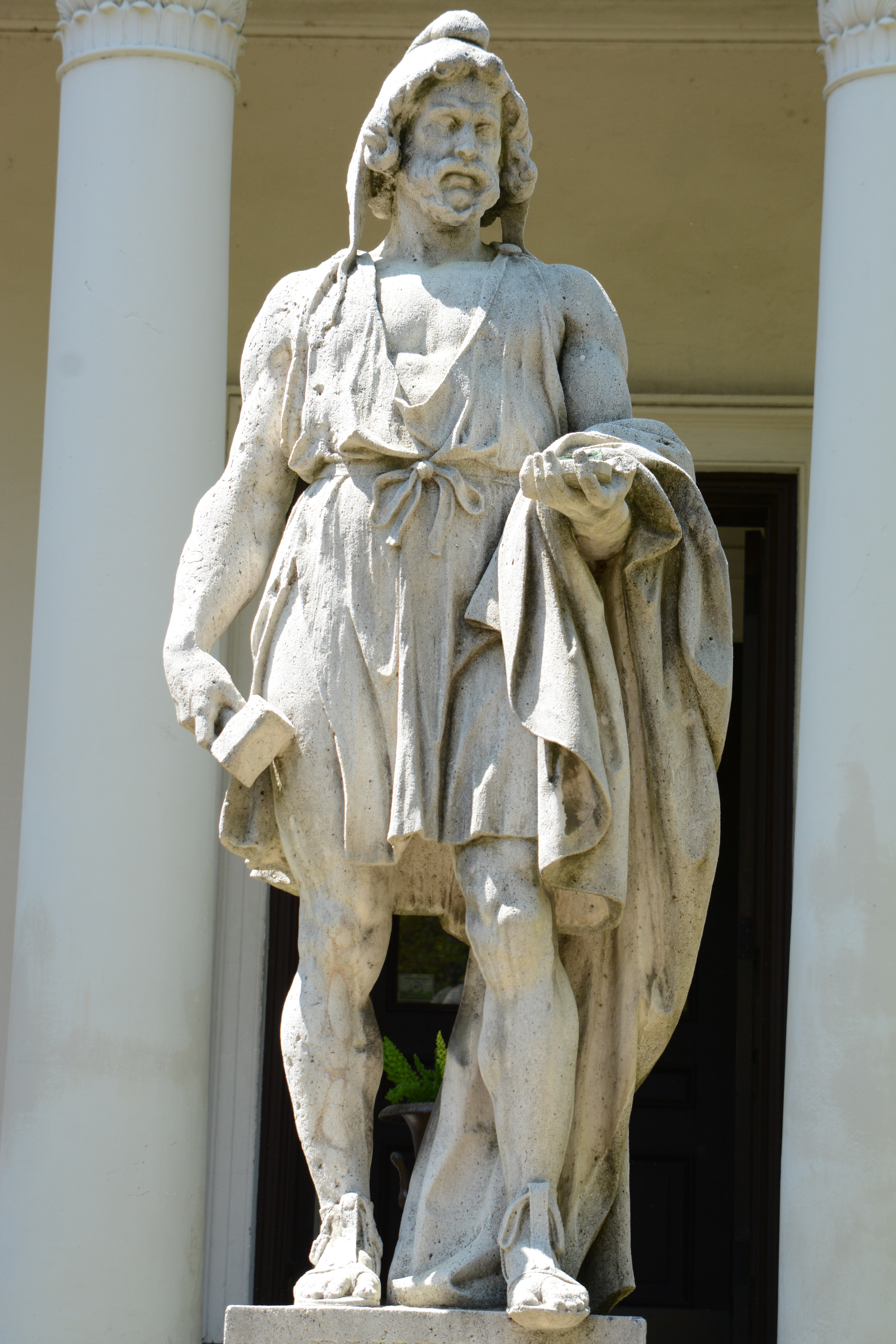
Phidias

== Sources ==
- "Тильгнер, Виктор-Оскар" . Brockhaus and Efron Encyclopedic Dictionary (in Russian). 1906.
- "Tilgner, Victor Oskar". Benezit Dictionary of Artists. 2011.
