= Pechová =

Pechová may refer to:

- Pech (surname) (feminine: Pechová), Czech surname
- Pecha (surname) (feminine: Pechová), Czech surname
- Ema Pechová (1869–1965), Czech actress
- Marta Pechová (born 1952), Czech basketball player
- Jana Vollmer, née Pechová (born 1973), Czech-German beach volleyball player
