= Pechanec =

Czech surname

Pechanec (feminine: Pechancová) is a Czech surname. According to the most likely theories, it was derived either from the given name Petr, or from the German word Pech, which has two main meanings: 'bad luck' (which would mean that the surname originated as a term for a person afflicted with bad luck), as well as 'resin' (which would mean that it is an occupational surname originated as a term for a person working with resin). Similar names with the same origin theories are e.g. Pech, Pecha and Pecháček.

Notable people with the surname include:

- Antonín Pechanec (born 1991), Czech ice hockey player
