= Pech (surname) =

Pech is a surname. The surname commonly appears in Czech (feminine: Pechová). According to the most likely theories, the Czech surname was derived either from the given name Petr, or from the German word Pech. The word Pech means 'bad luck' (which would mean that the surname originated as a term for a person afflicted with bad luck), but also 'resin' (which would mean that the surname originated as a term for a person working with resin). Similar names with the same origin theories are e.g. Pecha, Pecháček and Pechanec.

Notable people with the surname include:

- David Pech (born 2002), Czech footballer
- Dominik Pech (born 2006), Czech footballer
- Jan Pech (1886–1924), Czech footballer
- Jana Vollmer, née Pechová (born 1986), Czech-German beach volleyball player
- Lawrence Pech (born 1959), American dancer and composer
- Leydy Pech (born 1965), Mexican beekeeper and environmental activist
- Lukáš Pech (born 1983), Czech ice hockey player
- Marco Pech, Belizean politician
- Marta Pechová (born 1952), Czech basketball player
- Martín Ramírez Pech (born 1968), Mexican politician
- Miloš Pech (born 1927), Czech sprint canoeist
- Philippe Pech (born 1966), French tennis player
- Samrith Pech, Cambodian politician
- Thorsten Pech (born 1960), German musician
- Václav Pech (born 1976), Czech rally driver
