= Ada Christen =

Austrian writer (1839–1901)

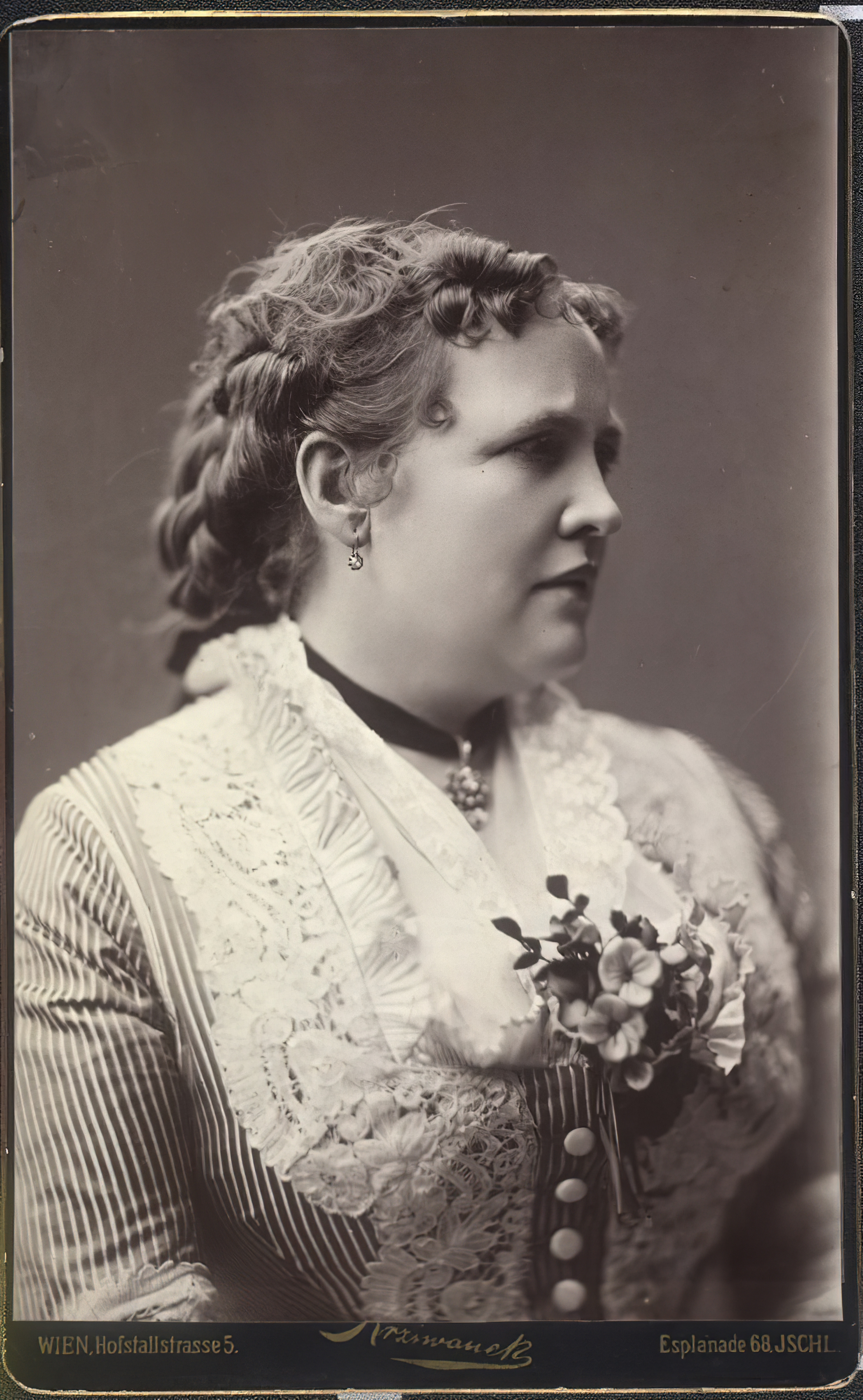
- Born: Christiane Rosalia Friederik; 6 March 1839; Vienna
- Died: 19 May 1901 (aged 62); Inzersdorf
- Resting place: Matzleinsdorf Protestant Cemetery, Vienna
- Occupation: Writer
- Writing career
- Pen name: Ada Carla; Christiane von Breden; Christiane Rosalie Frederick; Christine von Neupauer; Satanella

Ada Christen, also known as Ada Carla, Christiane von Breden, Christine von Neupauer, and Satanella (6 March 1839 – 19 May 1901), was an Austrian writer.

== Life ==
Christen was born in 1839 in Vienna with little formal education growing up. Her father was imprisoned for joining one of the revolutions of 1848 in the Austrian Empire and he died young leaving the family impoverished. Christen became an actress at 15, joining a group of wandering actors. She married Sigmund von Neupar and returned to Vienna. Her only child died in 1866, and her first husband, mentally ill, died in 1868. Her first poem Lieder einer Verlorenen was written at the death bed of her husband and published with the assistance of the writer Friedrich of Saarland. With encouragement from friends, she started publishing under pen names in journals around this time. Lieder einer Verlorenen was very popular and was published again the next year. In total she wrote four books of poetry. She also wrote short stories and sketches about surviving on the margins. She married nobleman Adalmar von Breden in 1873, and became financially secure again with that marriage. The marriage allowed her to join the Viennese elite making her way into the literary circle which Ludwig Anzengruber belonged. She died in 1901.

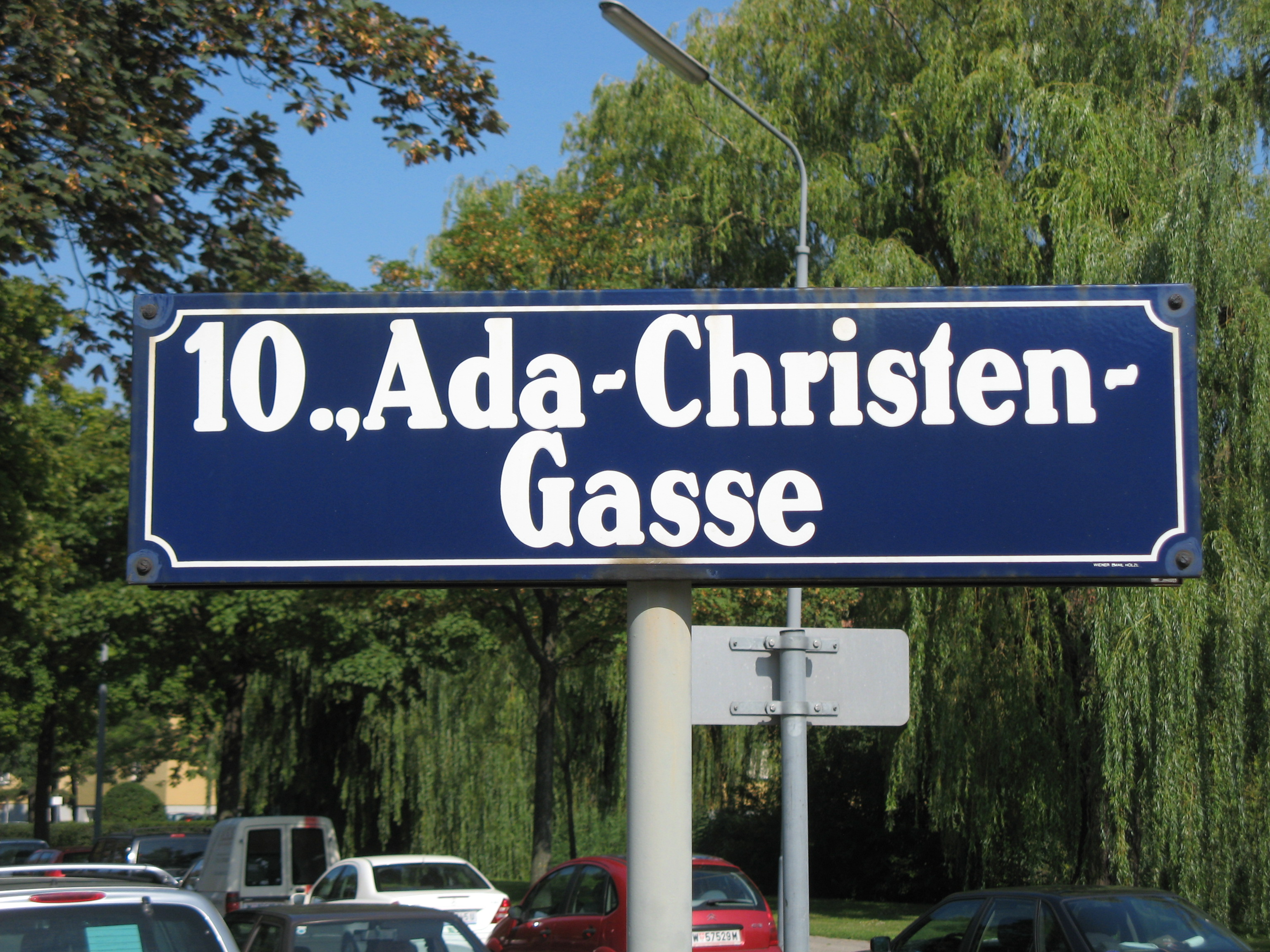
Ada-Christen-Gasse in Vienna.

== Published works ==
Ada Christen's published works as cited by An Encyclopedia of Continental Women Writers.

- Lieder einer Verlorenen, poetry, 1868.
- Aus der Asche, poetry, 1870.
- Faustine, drama, 1871.
- Schatten, poetry, 1873.
- Vom Wege, fiction, 1874.
- Aus der Tiefe, poetry, 1878.
- Aus dem Leben, fiction, 1878.
- Unsere Nachbarn, fiction, 1884.
- Als sie starb, fiction, 1888.
- Jungfer Mutter, fiction 1892.
- Wiener Leut' , drama, 1893.
- Als er heimkehrte, fiction, 1912 [Editor]

Published posthumously, as shown in the Sophie German women's database:

- Erzählungen, Berlin: Union Verlag, 1964.
- Noth, Frankfurt am Main, 1991.
- Ein Balg, Frankfurt am Main, 1991.

== See also ==
- List of Austrian writers
