= Mozart Monument, Vienna =

Monument in Vienna, Austria

- Mozart-Denkmal
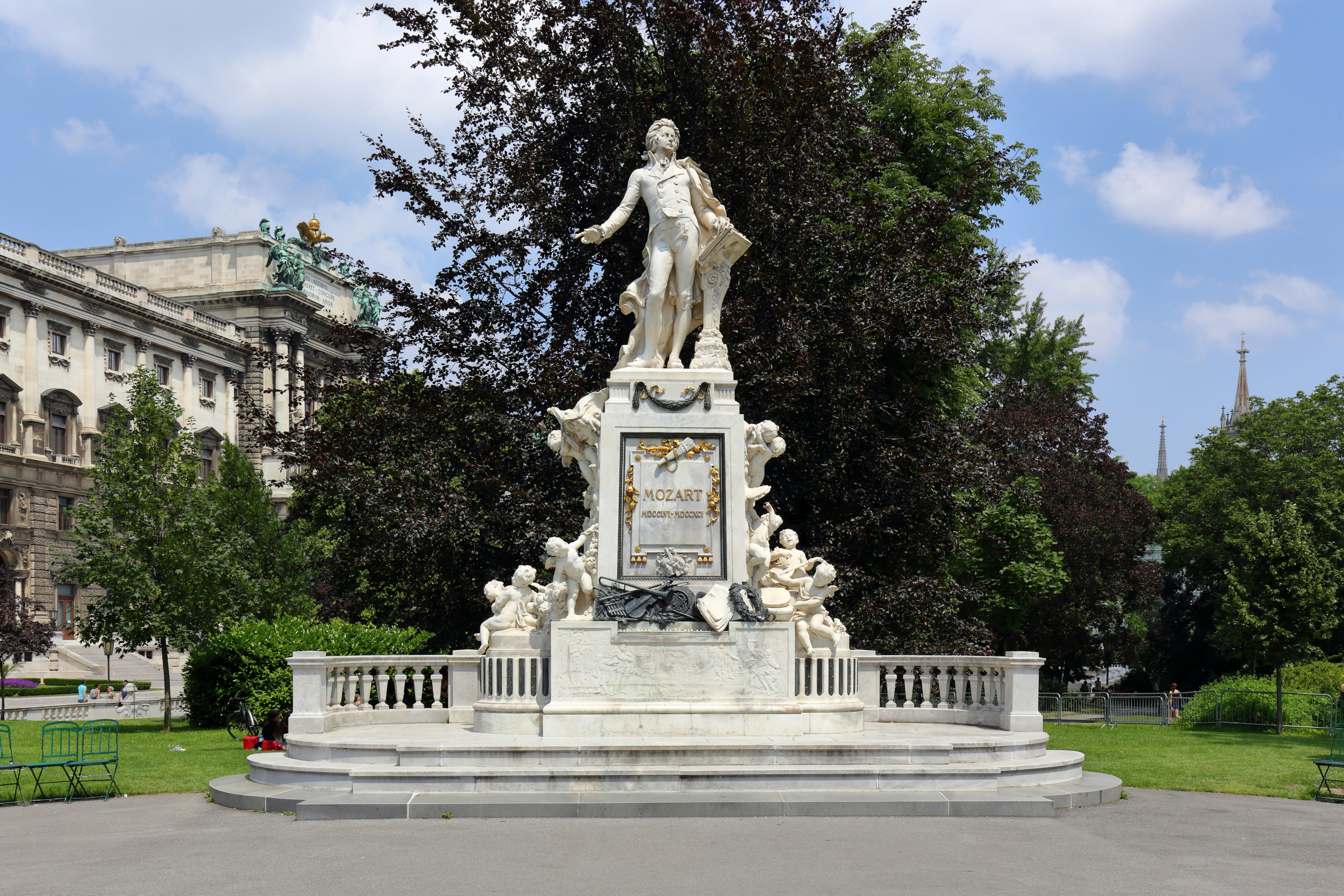
- The monument in the Burggarten
- Interactive map of Mozart Monument, Vienna
- Location: Burggarten, Innere Stadt, Vienna, Austria
- Coordinates: 48°12′14.76″N 16°21′53.28″E
- Designer: Karl König; Viktor Tilgner
- Type: Statue
- Material: Marble
- Height: 7.5 mt
- Opening date: April 21, 1896
- Dedicated to: Wolfgang Amadeus Mozart

The Mozart Monument (German: Mozart-Denkmal) is a monument located in the Burggarten in the Innere Stadt district of Vienna, Austria since 1953. It is dedicated to composer Wolfgang Amadeus Mozart (1756–1791).

This 7.5-meter-high statue was made by the architect Karl König (1841–1915) and the sculptor Viktor Tilgner (1844–1896) and was unveiled at Albrechtsplatz (today Albertinaplatz) on April 21, 1896, five days after Tilgner died. Tilgner's signature was completed with his death date.

== Description ==
The sculptures are made of Laas marble from the Vinschgau, South Tyrol, whereas the steps of the foundation are made of dark diorite. The statue features componist Mozart with a music stand. The socle is adorned with ornaments, masks and wreaths and is framed within a semi-circular balustrade made of rough marble from Sterzing. The putti on the socle, which represent the power of Mozart's music, are stylistically suggestive of Art Nouveau.

On the front, a relief refers to two scenes of Mozart's opera Don Giovanni. The back side relief, based on a design by Louis Carmontelle, represents the six-year-old Mozart playing music with his father Leopold and his sister Nannerl.

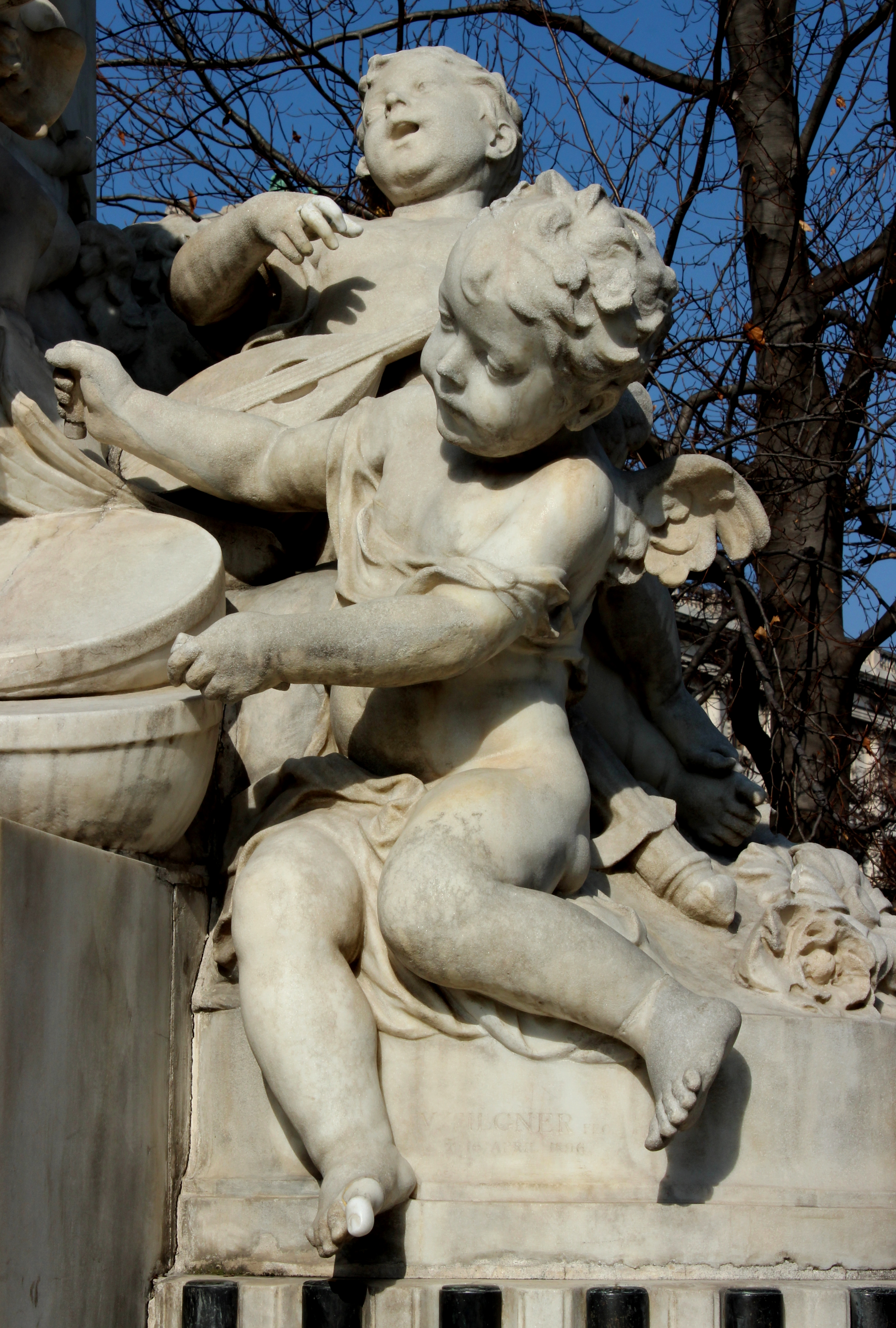
Putti and Tilgner's signature

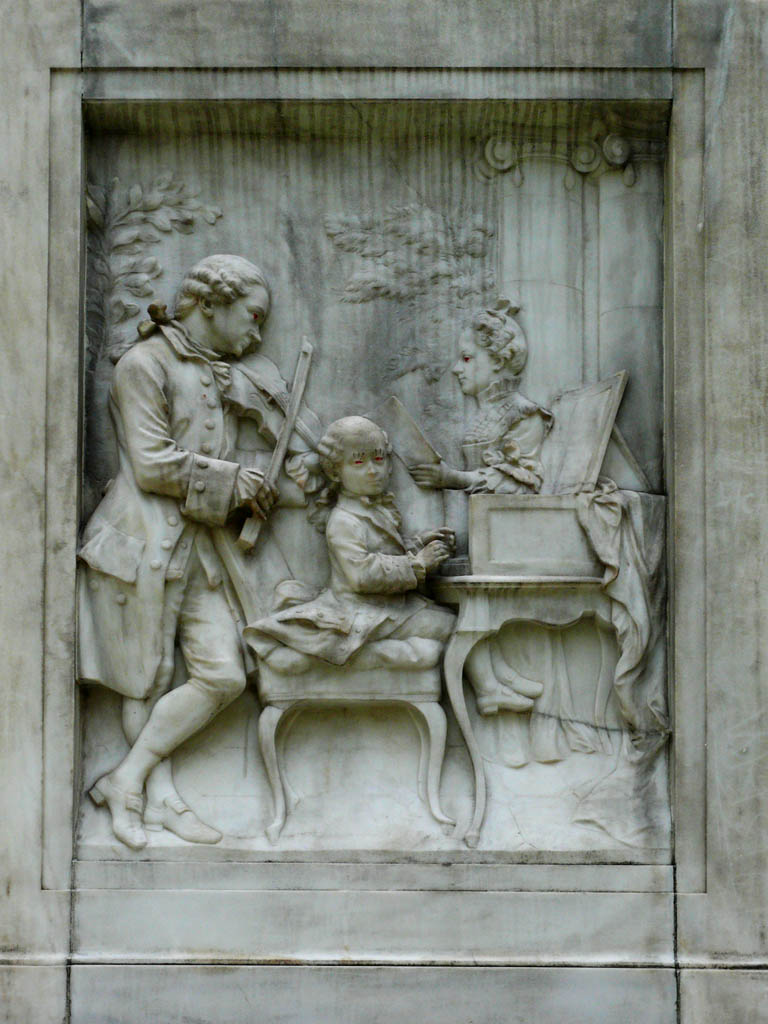
Relief on the back side

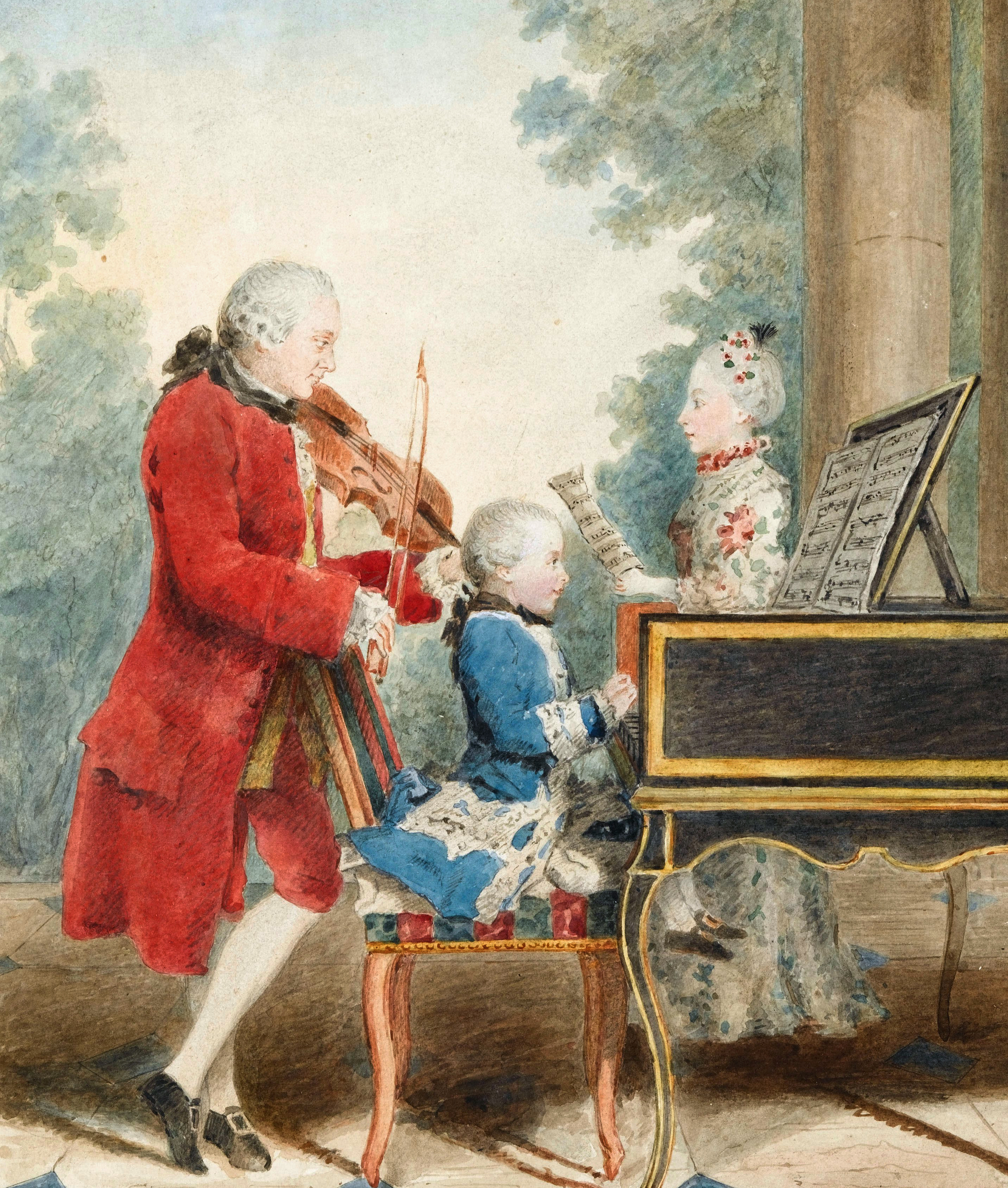
Louis Carmontelle's template for the back side of the monument

== History ==
Funds were raised for a Mozart Monument 77 years before the statue was unveiled. But choosing the design and the location of the monument was problematic. Several proposals included Rathauspark, Stadtpark and Albrechtplatz. Two art competitions were organised to select the design of the monument. Tilgner's design came second in the professional jury's choice, but was selected by the Mozart Monument Committee over Edmund von Hellmer's draft.

The monument was damaged by the bombing of Vienna on March 12, 1945, before it was restored and placed at its actual location in the Burggaten on June 5, 1953. During the restoration, two sand-lime brick columns were added to the monument.

In 1992, the city of Vienna gifted a copy of the monument to Tokyo.

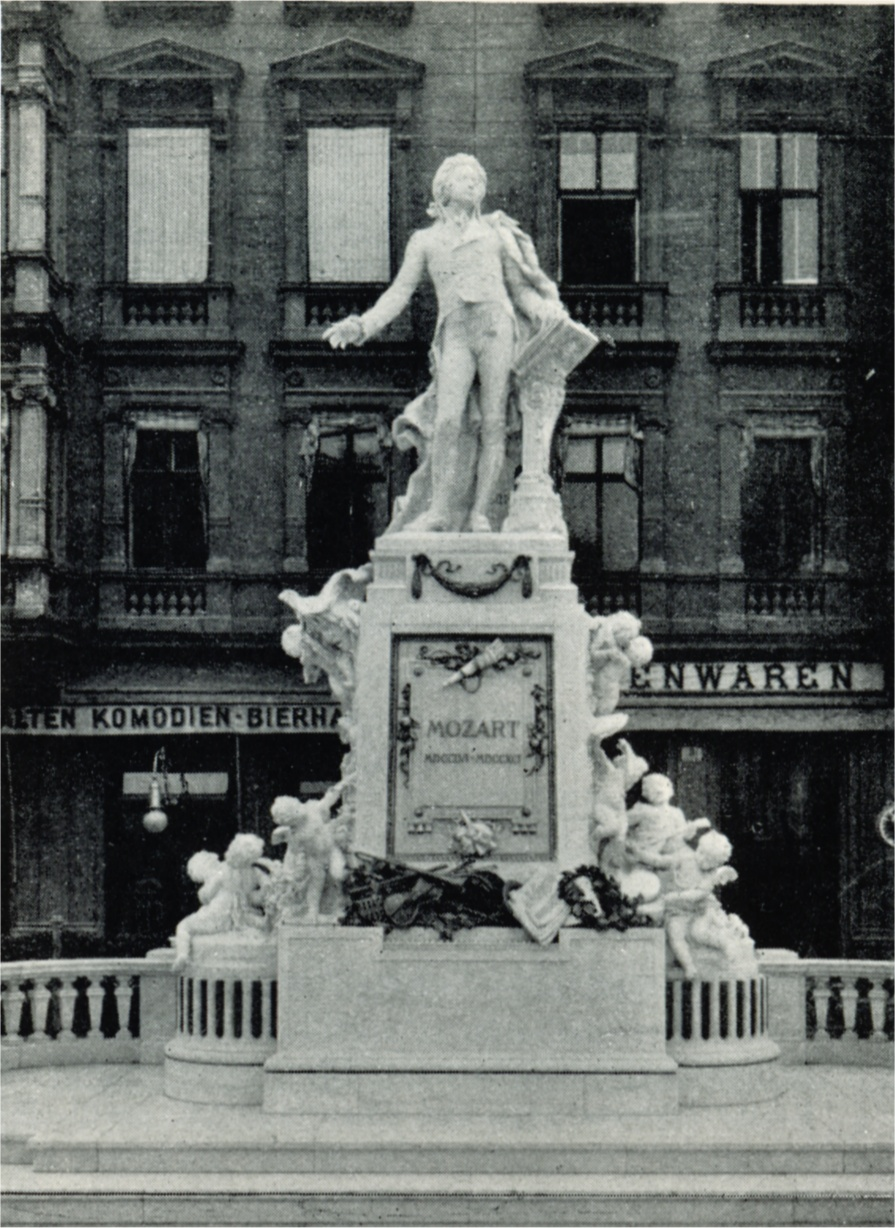
The monument at its original location (c. 1900)

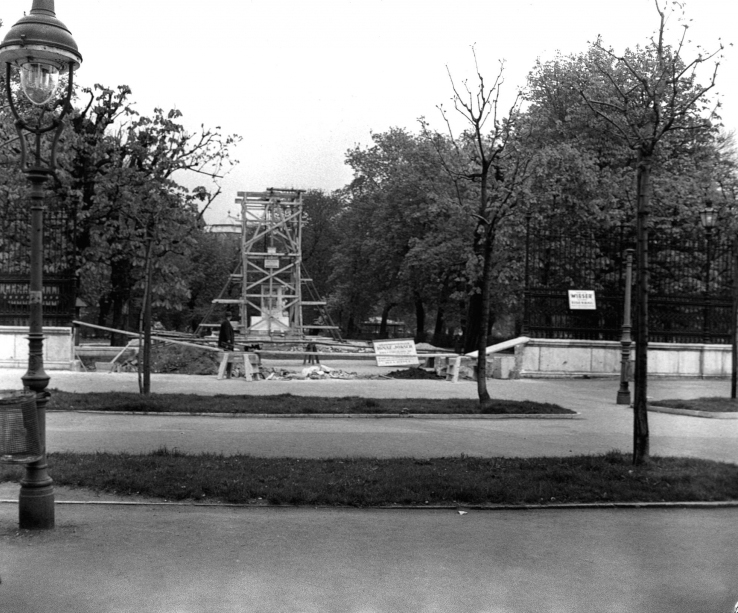
The pedestal being installed in the Burggarten (April 17, 1953)

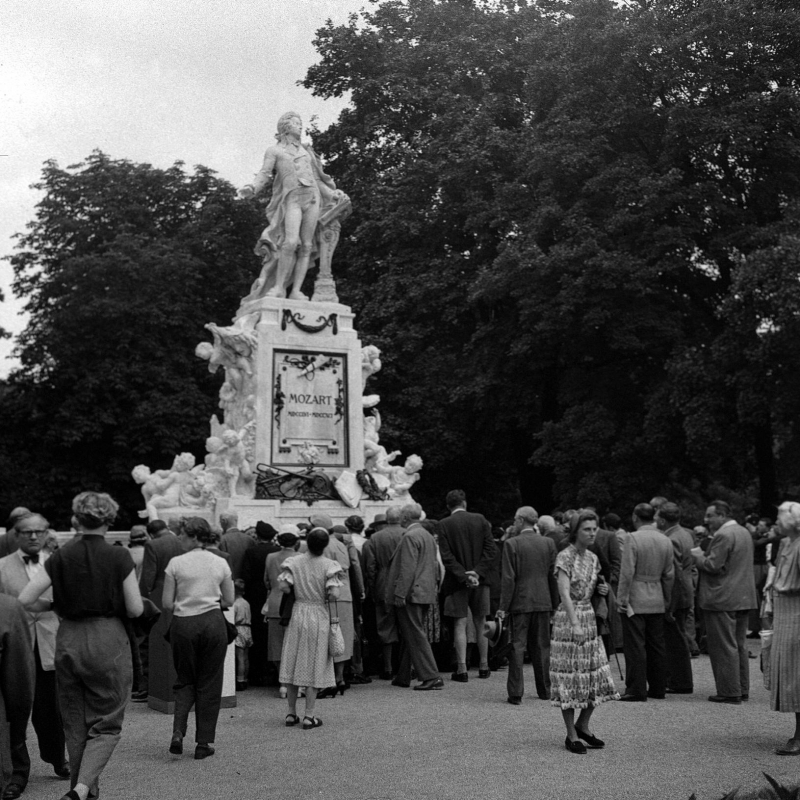
The newly erected monument (June 17, 1953)

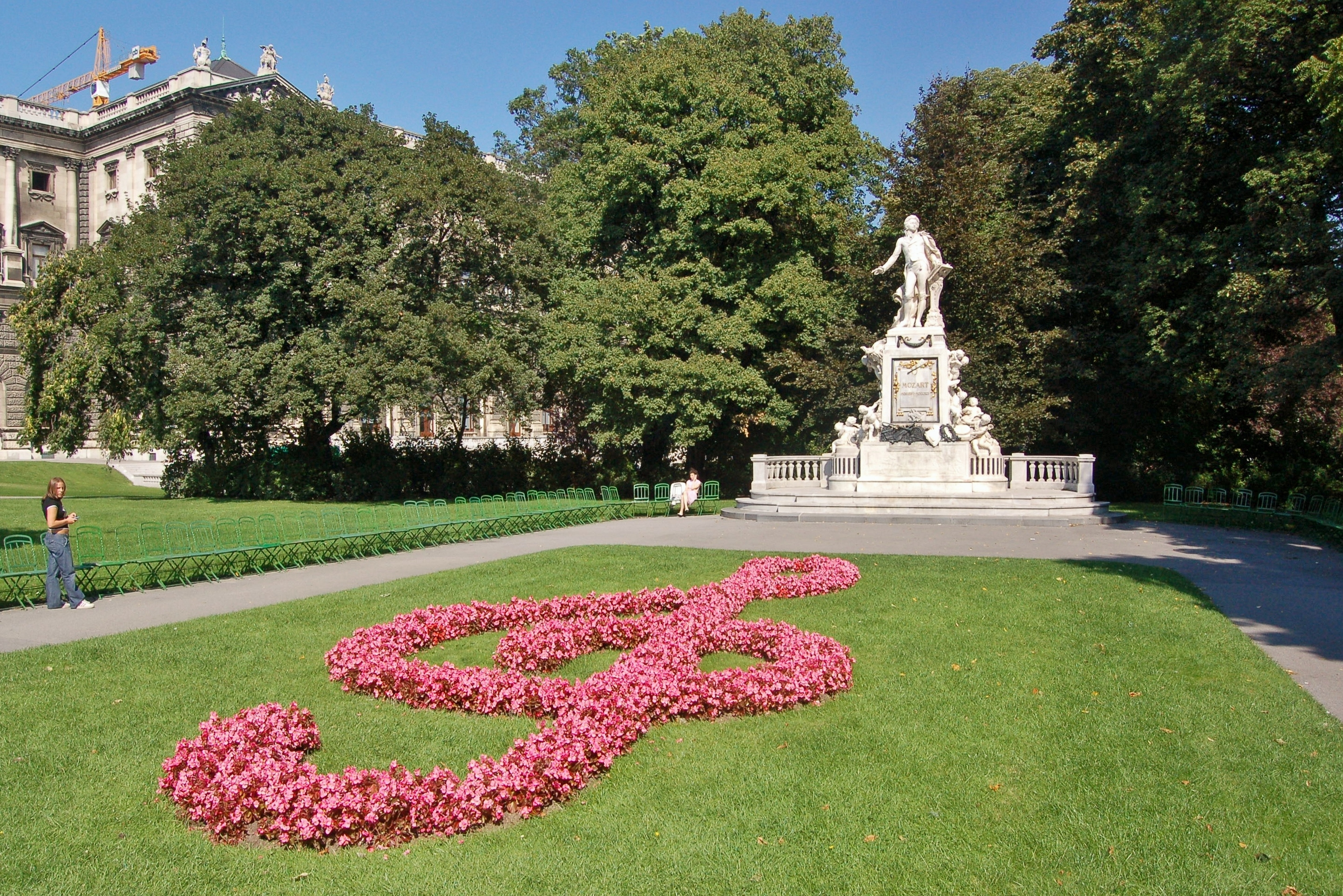
Vienna Mozart statue and Sol key
