= František Martin Pecháček =

Czech violinist and composer (1763–1816)

František Martin Pecháček (also Francis Martin Pechatschek, Pechaczek, Behatschek; 10 November 1763 – 26 September 1816) was a Czech violinist, pedagogue, arranger and diligent composer. His son Franz Pecháček became known as a virtuoso violinist and composer. The collections of the Municipal Museum in Ústí nad Orlicí contain two of his compositions, a piece for violin and orchestra entitled Rondeau brilliant and a concert duo for two violins, Polonaise.

== Early life ==
František Pecháček was born in the back of a low category restaurant in Ústí nad Orlicí in Bohemia. He received his first grammar and music lessons in Ústí nad Orlicí, and then went to Litomyšl where he studied under the guidance of choir director and pianist P. Lambert. Later he went to study philosophy and also acquire further musical training as a violinist from Carl Ditters von Dittersdorf in Weißwasser, then part of Austrian Silesia.

== Musical career ==
Pecháček moved to Vienna when he was twenty years old, where in 1790 he began acting as conductor of the Landstraßer Theaters and the Theater am Kärntnertor.

Pecháček composed two large and ten small comic operas, twelve symphonies, thirty ballets, several masses and various piano and church music works, totaling over 100 opuses. On the occasion of the visit of King of Naples Ferdinand I in Vienna in 1801 was conducted with great success of his ballet "Forest Nymph". The main focus of his compositional activity consisted in the creation of dance music, such as laendler, waltzes, and minuets. In this field he gained such popularity, later only enjoyed by Joseph Lanner and Johann Strauss, of whom he is considered a forerunner.

== Death ==
He died from exhaustion on the 26 September 1816 in Vienna, Esterházovském street, house No. 419, and was then buried at the now defunct Matzleinsdorf Protestant Cemetery. After his death, all his works fell completely into oblivion.
