= Christine Enghaus =

German actress

- Johanne Louise Christine Engehausen
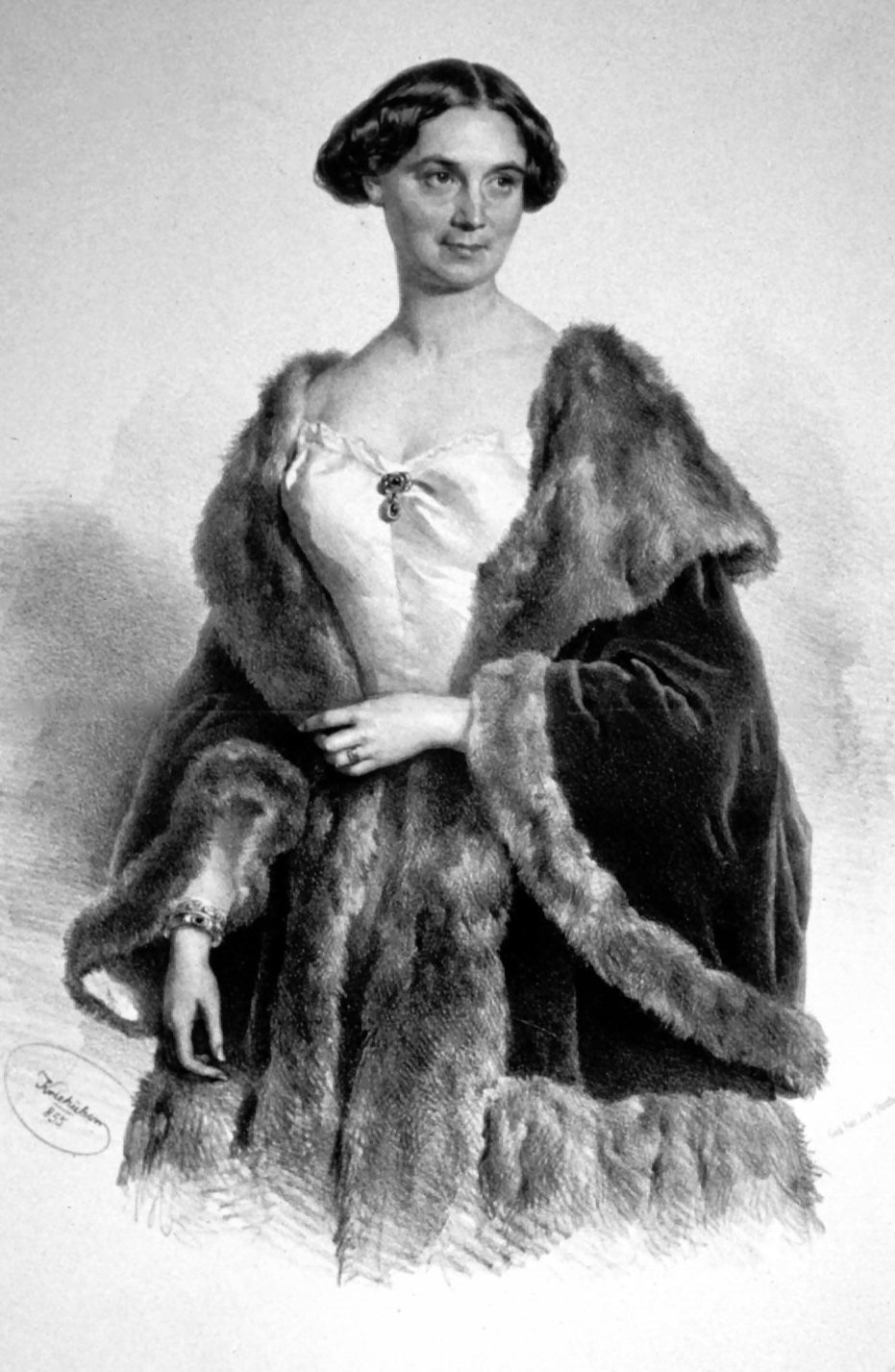
- Born: 9 February 1817; Braunschweig
- Died: 20 June 1910; Vienna
- Occupation: Actress
- Years active: 1829–1875
- Spouse: Friedrich Hebbel (m. 1846)
- Children: Emil Hebbel (1846–1847), Christine Hebbel (1847-1922)

Christine Enghaus, pseudonym of Johanne Louise Christine Engehausen, (9 February 1817 in Braunschweig – 20 June 1910 in Vienna) was a German actress and wife of the German playwright Friedrich Hebbel.

== Early years ==
Christine Engehausen was born in Braunschweig, and grew up under poor circumstances in a large family. She had work early to contribute to the living of the family, because her father died before she turned seven. On the initiative of her mother, she was sent to the children's ballet at the state theatre at Braunschweig (Braunschweiger Hoftheater) at the age of seven. Due to her artistic talent she soon had little roles in plays and was finally discovered and supported by K. Köchy.

== Breakthrough ==
Starting in 1829, Enghaus belonged to the ensemble of the state theatre in Braunschweig. She had her breakthrough in 1833 when she played Joan of Arc in Bremen and was immediately hired to play in this city. Soon after she played in the city theater of Hamburg where she was first spotted on stage by her later husband, Friedrich Hebbel. In 1840, already famous, she was engaged to play at the Burgtheater and belonged to the ensemble until 1875.

== Marriage to Friedrich Hebbel ==
Christine Enghaus and Friedrich Hebbel married in Vienna on 26 May 1846. After the marriage, Enghaus stayed in Vienna but also played in Weimar and mostly personified tragic female characters from her husband's plays. She had two children: Emil (1846–1847) and Christine (1847-1922). She died in Vienna at the age of 93.

== Nachleben ==
The importance of Christine Enghausen (amongst other things, a safe source of money for her husband) can also be seen in the fact that two novels exist with her as the leading character (see literature section).

== Literature ==
- Waldemar Augustiny: Elise und Christine. Die beiden Frauen im Leben Friedrich Hebbels. Heide: Boyens 1986 ISBN 3-8042-0366-3
- Else Hoppe: Die Ebenbürtigen. Christine Engehausens Ehe mit Friedrich Hebbel, Braunschweig 1943
- Garzmann, Schuegraf, Pingel: Braunschweiger Stadtlexikon - Ergänzungsband, Braunschweig 1996
- Hans Knudsen: Hebbel, Christine. In: NDB Bd. 8, S. 159 f.
