= Leydy Pech =

Mexican environmental activist

- Leydy Araceli Pech Marín
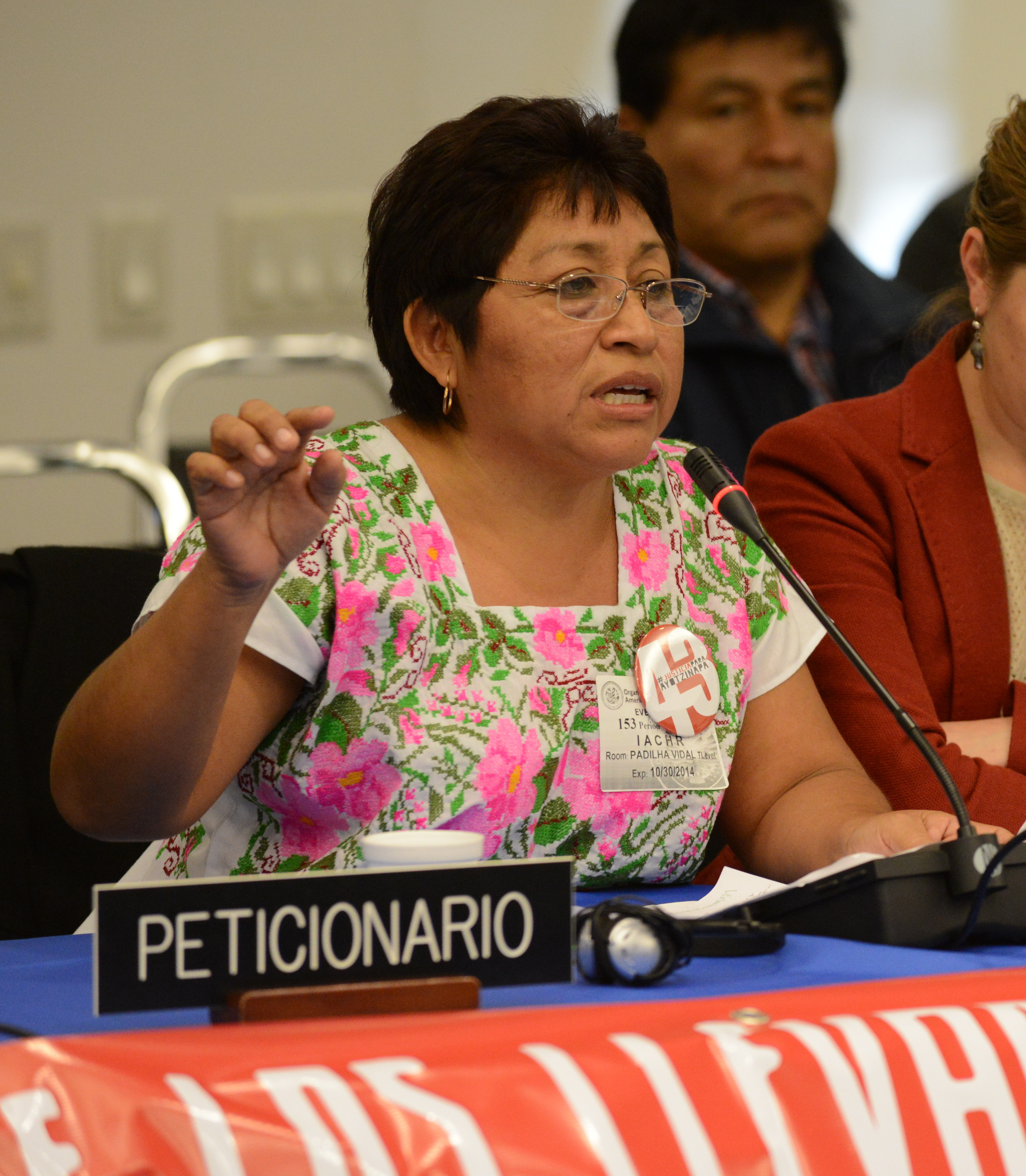
- Pech in 2014
- Born: 1965 (age 60–61); Hopelchén, Campeche
- Citizenship: Mexico
- Occupations: Environmental activist, beekeeper
- Awards: Goldman Prize (2020)

Leydy Araceli Pech Marín, known as Leydy Pech, (born 1965) is a Mexican beekeeper and environmental activist of Mayan origin. She was awarded the Goldman Environmental Prize in 2020 for her work against the planting of transgenic soybeans in the Yucatán Peninsula.

== Beekeeping work ==
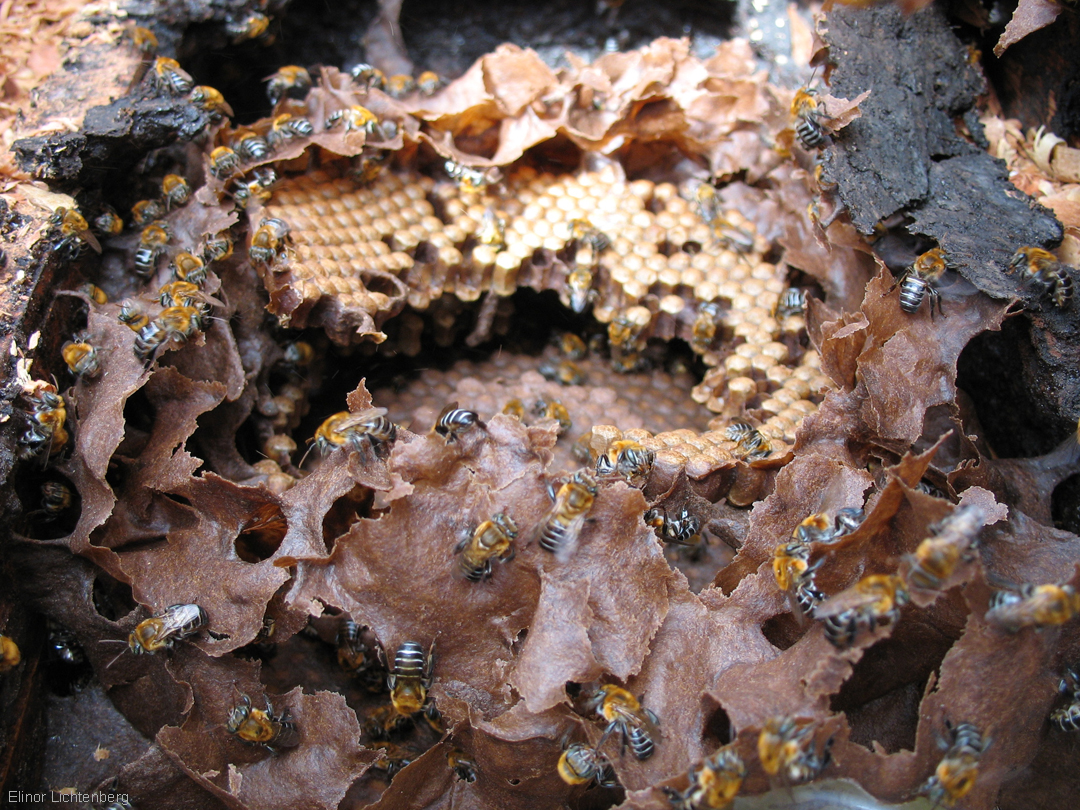
Melipona nest in a hollow log

Leydy Pech is primarily engaged in beekeeping. She keeps a variety of stingless bee called Melipona beecheii, which has been raised as a part of traditional Mayan culture in several communities for centuries. Melipona beecheii creates its hives inside hollow logs. While most beekeepers prefer to use the species Apis mellifera, Pech and her community use M. beecheii in an effort to preserve the tradition of using the melipona variety of the species in the region, which is locally known as Xunaan Kab (the Lady of Honey).

Pech owns two hectares of land on which she cultivates honey in this traditional way. Pech's organization seeks to develop a sense of community through the collective work of raising the bees and collecting their honey. She seeks to emulate the nearby community of Ich Eq, where families work together and support each other to survive.

== Environmental activism ==
Pech became involved in environmental activism in 2000, at the same time as Monsanto began cultivating transgenic soybeans in Campeche. The level of cultivation continued to increase, and by 2012 agribusiness was occurring on a larger scale. This increase in the cultivation of transgenic soybeans negatively impacted honey production in the state, reducing yields and contaminating honey harvests. This decrease in the productivity of the bees directly put local Mayan communities at risk, as beekeeping was their primary way of putting food on the table.

For this reason, Pech founded the Muuch Kambal coalition and the Colectivo Apícola de los Chenes, two groups that sued the government to stop the cultivation of this type of transgenic crop. In 2015, the Mexican Supreme Court ruled that indigenous communities must be consulted before the cultivation of any transgenic crops occurs. In 2017, Monsanto's permission to grow genetically modified seeds was revoked in Campeche, Yucatán, and five other states in Mexico.

Because of her activism and the success of her community, Pech received the Goldman Environmental Prize in 2020, an award which is viewed as the environmental Nobel. The organization which presented the award noted that Pech was discriminated against by Monsanto and its lawyers, who alluded to their disbelief that a woman had defeated them. According to Pech, the award "represents a recognition of the work of the Mayan communities of the Chenes (a region of Campeche) and of the unity of the Mayan territory." During the ceremony, which was held virtually, she said:"

The award gives me the opportunity to tell the world that the territories of indigenous peoples are being dispossessed for the imposition of megaprojects, extractivism, agribusiness, tourism and others that strengthen a capitalist model that affects natural resources and our means of employment.
