= Franz Pecháček =

Austrian-German violinist and composer (1793–1840)

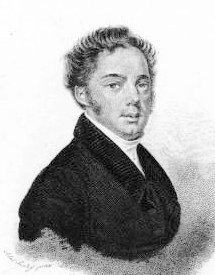
- Franz Pecháček by Johann Jaresch after Adalbert Suchy

Background information
- Born: Franz Xaver Pecháček; 4 July 1793; Vienna
- Died: 15 September 1840 (aged 47) Karlsruhe
- Genres: Classical
- Occupation: Violinist
- Instrument: Violin

Franz Xaver Pecháček (4 July 1793 – 15 September 1840) was an Austrian-German violin virtuoso and composer of Czech origin. Besides polonaises, variations, Rondos and potpourris for violin and orchestra, he composed two string quartets and the Adagio et Polonaise for clarinet and orchestra.

== Biography ==
Franz Pecháček was born on 4 July 1793 in Vienna. He was a very gifted student and already at a very early age performed as a soloist. He was trained by his father František Martin Pecháček and by Ignaz Schuppanzigh and Emanuel Aloys Förster. When he was six he performed before the imperial court and in 1803 he went publicly with his father for the first time to Prague, where he was received with great success, thus gaining his reputation as a child prodigy. Other musical education he acquired in Vienna, where he studied composition with Förster.

From 1809 to 1822, he was a violinist at the Theater an der Wien, first as a concertmaster and later as a second conductor. In 1818, he was appointed first violinist of the Hanoverian court orchestra. Guest performance tours took him further to Dresden and Leipzig, and from 1824 to 1825 the cities of southern Germany. He also became concertmaster of the court orchestra in Stuttgart from 1822 until 1826, being appointed as concertmaster of the Grand Duke of Baden Karlsruhe court orchestra in 1827, where he worked until his death on 15 September 1840. In 1832, he made a trip to Paris, but there the expected success did not come. Parisians saw in his play an imitation of Niccolo Paganini and, as a result of his strenuous concerts, he was only a disappointment.

As a violinist and composer Pecháček was very esteemed, writing works almost exclusively for solo violin with accompaniment. These virtuoso pieces, of which he wrote around 40, do not show an especially individual style. They are short pieces for violin and orchestra, dances and variations.

== Works ==
- Deuxie (1822)
- Grand Quatuor for string quartet, Op. 4 (1818)
- Quatuor brillant for string quartet, Op. 7
- Variations on Schubert's German Dance D365 No. 2 Trauerwalzer, Op. 9
- Adagio et Polonaise for piano four-hands,'Op. 14
- First concertino for violin with accompaniment of orchestra, Op. 16 (1826)
- Variations sur un theme hongrois for violin with orchestra or two violins, viola and violoncello, Op. 17 (1834)
- Polonaise for Violin with orchestra accompaniment, Op. 18 (1826)
- Rondoletto for violin with orchestra accompaniment, Op. 19 (1826)
- Divertissement for solo violin with accompaniment of orchestra or two violins, viola and violoncello, Op. 20 (1826)
- Introduction and Brilliant Variations on a Favorite Air for violin with accompaniment for pianoforte, Op. 28 (1845)
