= Friedrich Hebbel =

German poet (1813–1863)

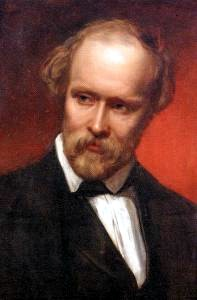
- Portrait (1851) by Carl Rahl
- Born: 18 March 1813; Wesselburen, Dithmarschen, Holstein
- Died: 13 December 1863 (aged 50); Vienna, Austrian Empire
- Occupations: poet and dramatist
- Writing career
- Notable awards: Schiller Prize

Christian Friedrich Hebbel (18 March 1813 – 13 December 1863) was a German poet and dramatist.

== Biography ==
Hebbel was born at Wesselburen in Dithmarschen, Holstein, the son of a bricklayer. He was educated at the Gelehrtenschule des Johanneums, a grammar school in Hamburg, Germany. Despite his humble origins, he showed a talent for poetry, resulting in the publication in the Hamburg Modezeitung of verses which he had sent to Amalie Schoppe (1791–1858), a popular journalist and author of nursery tales. Through her patronage, he was able to go to the University of Hamburg.

A year later he went to Heidelberg University to study law, but gave it up and went on to the Ludwig-Maximilians-Universität München, where he devoted himself to philosophy, history and literature. In 1839, Hebbel left Munich and walked all the way back to Hamburg, where he resumed his friendship with Elise Lensing, whose self-sacrificing assistance had helped him over the darkest days in Munich. In the same year, he wrote his first tragedy, Judith (1840, published 1841), which was performed in Hamburg and Berlin the following year, making his name known throughout Germany.

In 1840, he wrote the tragedy Genoveva, and the following year he completed a comedy, Der Diamant, which he had begun at Munich. In 1842, he visited Copenhagen, where he obtained from King Christian VIII a small traveling stipend, which enabled him to spend time in Paris and two years (1844 to 1846) in Italy. In Paris, he wrote the "tragedy of common life," Maria Magdalena (1844). On his return from Italy, Hebbel met in Vienna two Prussian noblemen of the Zerboni di Sposetti family, who in their enthusiasm for his genius urged him to remain, providing financial support that allowed him to mingle in the best intellectual society of the Austrian capital.

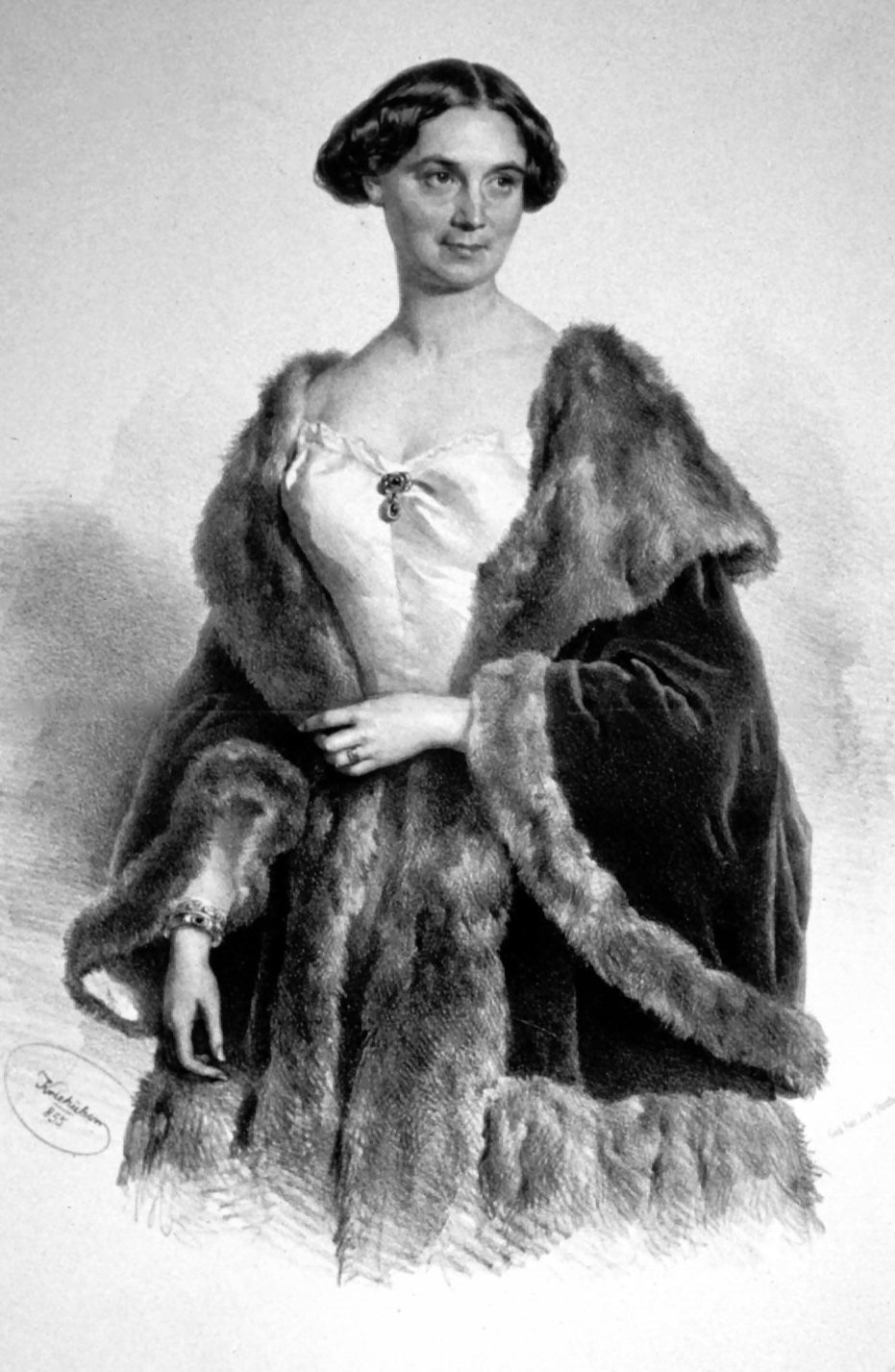
Christine Hebbel, 1855

Hebbel's old precarious existence now became a horror to him, and he broke with the past by marrying (in 1846) the beautiful and wealthy actress Christine Enghaus. In choosing this path, he abandoned Elise Lensing (who remained faithful to him until her death), on the grounds that "a man's first duty is to the most powerful force within him, that which alone can give him happiness and be of service to the world" -- in his case the ability to write, which would have perished "in the miserable struggle for existence." This "deadly sin," which, "if peace of conscience be the test," was, he believed, the best decision of his life. Lensing, however, still provided inspiration for his art. As late as 1851, shortly after her death, he wrote the little epic Mutter und Kind, intended to show that the parent-child relationship is the essential factor for happiness, among all classes and under all conditions.

Hebbel had already achieved fame long before this, with German sovereigns bestowing honors upon him. In foreign capitals he was fêted as the greatest of living German dramatists. From the grand-duke of Saxe-Weimar he received a flattering invitation to take up his residence at Weimar, where several of his plays were first performed. He remained, however, at Vienna until his death.

== Works ==
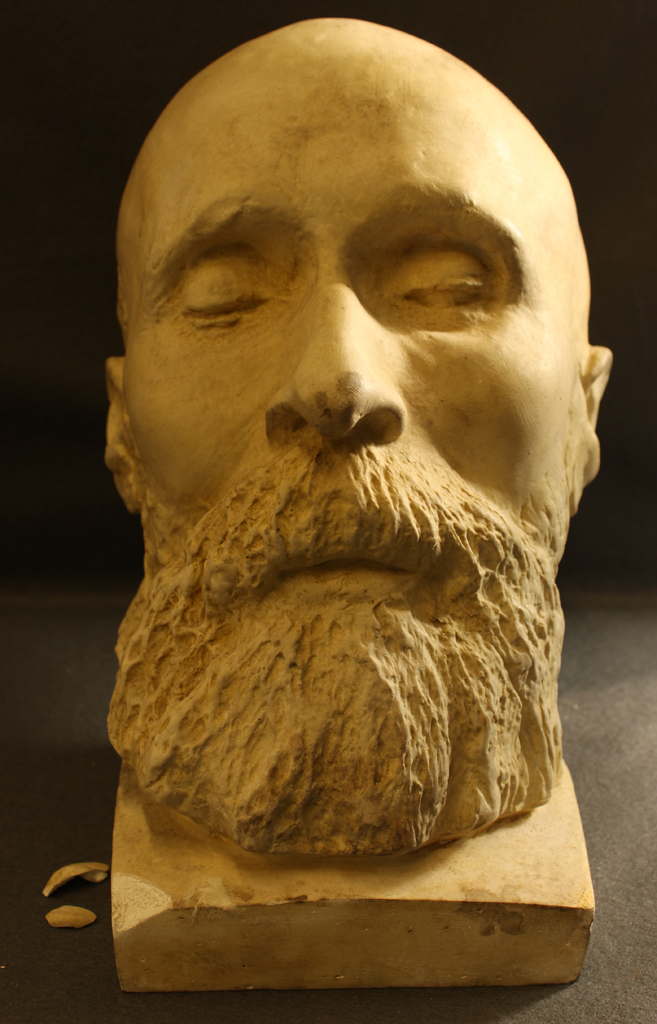
Deathmask

Besides the works already mentioned, Hebbel's principal tragedies are:

- Herod and Mariamne (1850)
- Julia (1851)
- Michel Angelo (1851)
- Agnes Bernauer (1855)
- Gyges and His Ring (1856)
- Die Nibelungen (1862), his last work (a trilogy consisting of a prologue, Der gehörnte Siegfried, and the tragedies, Siegfrieds Tod and Kriemhilds Rache), which won for the author the Schiller Prize.

Of his comedies Der Diamant (1847), Der Rubin (1850) and the tragi-comedy Ein Trauerspiel in Sizilien (1845), are the more important, but they are heavy and hardly rise above mediocrity. All his dramatic productions, however, exhibit skill in characterization, great glow of passion, and a true feeling for dramatic situation; but their poetic effect is frequently marred by extravagances which border on the grotesque, and by the introduction of incidents the unpleasant character of which is not sufficiently relieved. In many of his lyric poems, and especially in Mutter und Kind, published in 1859, Hebbel showed that his poetic gifts were not restricted to the drama.

Hebbel's short stories are often wry and witty observations of society. His well-known story "The master tailor Nepomuk Schlägel in the search for joy" has been published in English.

His collected works were first published by E. Kuh in 12 volumes at Hamburg, 1866–1868.

== Music ==
Some of Hebbel's works were set to music, such as his poem Requiem by Peter Cornelius and in Max Reger's Hebbel Requiem. Reger set his poem "Die Weihe der Nacht" for voice, choir and orchestra. Robert Schumann's opera Genoveva is based on a play of Hebbel.

In 1872 Samuel de Lange used Hebbel's poem "Ein frühes Liebesleben" in an unusual instrumentation for voice, string quartet and harp. An arrangement with piano instead of harp was made during a centennial revival of Samuel and Daniël de Lange's music.

Eduard Lassen wrote incidental music to Die Nibelungen in 1873. In 1878/79 Franz Liszt combined music from the Die Nibelungen setting with excerpts from Lassen's incidental music to Goethe's Faust, in a single piano transcription, Aus der Musik zu Hebbels Nibelungen und Goethes Faust (S.496).

In 1922 Emil von Reznicek composed an opera Holofernes after Hebbel's Judith und Holofernes.

Anna Teichmüller used Hebbel's text for her composition Schlafen, Schlafen, opus 24.

The poem "Dem Schmerz sein Recht" was set to music by Alban Berg in 4 Gesänge, Op. 2, No 1.

== Films ==
- Glutmensch (A man aglow, 1975), 90 minutes; writer and director: Jonatan Briel; production: SFB and Literarisches Berliner Kolloquium; plot: Hebbel is confined to his sickbed on his 50th birthday, and recalls his youth in his feverish dreams.
