= Pecha (surname) =

Pecha (feminine: Pechová) is a Czech and Slovak surname. Notable people with the surname include:

- Ivan Pecha (born 1986), Slovak footballer
- László Pecha (born 1986), Hungarian footballer
- Peter Pecha (born 1975), Slovak freestyle wrestler

== See also ==
- Pechová (disambiguation)
