= EuroBasket Records =

EuroBasket Records are the records attained during play in the EuroBasket, which is the pre-eminent pan-European international basketball tournament that is contested between national teams.

== Most Valuable Players and Top Scorers ==
Bronze	Member of the FIBA Hall of Fame.
Silver	Member of the Naismith Memorial Basketball Hall of Fame.
Gold	Member of both the FIBA Hall of Fame and the Naismith Memorial Basketball Hall of Fame.
Player (X)	Denotes the number of times the player was selected the MVP or was the Top Scorer.

Tournament	MVP	Top Scorer	PPG
EuroBasket 1935	(Spain) Rafael Martín	(Italy) Livio Franceschini	16.5
EuroBasket 1937	(Lithuania) Pranas Talzūnas	(Latvia) Rūdolfs Jurciņš	12.5
EuroBasket 1939	(Lithuania) Mykolas Ruzgys (de facto: (Lithuania) Pranas Lubinas)^{‡}	(Estonia) Heino Veskila	16.7
EuroBasket 1946	(Hungary) Ferenc Németh	(Poland) Paweł Stok	12.4
EuroBasket 1947	(Soviet Union) Joann Lõssov	(France) Jacques Perrier	12.7
EuroBasket 1949	(Turkey) Hüseyin Öztürk	(Turkey) Hüseyin Öztürk	19.3
EuroBasket 1951	(Czechoslovakia) Ivan Mrázek	(Czechoslovakia) Ivan Mrázek	17.1
EuroBasket 1953	(Soviet Union) Anatoly Konev	(Lebanon) Ahmed Idlibi	15.9
EuroBasket 1955	(Hungary) János Greminger	(Czechoslovakia) Miroslav Škeřík	19.1
EuroBasket 1957	(Czechoslovakia) Jiří Baumruk	(Belgium) Eddy Terrace	24.4
EuroBasket 1959	(Soviet Union) Viktor Zubkov	(Socialist Federal Republic of Yugoslavia) Radivoj Korać	27.6
EuroBasket 1961	(Socialist Federal Republic of Yugoslavia) Radivoj Korać	(Socialist Federal Republic of Yugoslavia) Radivoj Korać (2)	24.0
EuroBasket 1963	(Spain) Emiliano Rodríguez	(Socialist Federal Republic of Yugoslavia) Radivoj Korać (3)	26.4
EuroBasket 1965	(Soviet Union) Modestas Paulauskas	(Socialist Federal Republic of Yugoslavia) Radivoj Korać (4)	21.9
EuroBasket 1967	(Czechoslovakia) Jiří Zedníček	(Greece) Giorgos Kolokithas	25.4
EuroBasket 1969	(Soviet Union) Sergei Belov	(Greece) Giorgos Kolokithas (2)	23.0
EuroBasket 1971	(Socialist Federal Republic of Yugoslavia) Krešimir Ćosić	(Poland) Edward Jurkiewicz	22.0
EuroBasket 1973	(Spain) Wayne Brabender	(Bulgaria) Atanas Golomeev	22.3
EuroBasket 1975	(Socialist Federal Republic of Yugoslavia) Krešimir Ćosić (2)	(Bulgaria) Atanas Golomeev (2)	23.1
EuroBasket 1977	(Socialist Federal Republic of Yugoslavia) Dražen Dalipagić	(Netherlands) Kees Akerboom	26.4
EuroBasket 1979	(Israel) Miki Berkovich	(Poland) Mieczysław Młynarski	27.1
EuroBasket 1981	(Soviet Union) Valdis Valters	(Poland) Mieczysław Młynarski (2)	22.9
EuroBasket 1983	(Spain) Juan Antonio Corbalán	(Greece) Nikos Galis	33.6
EuroBasket 1985	(Soviet Union) Arvydas Sabonis	(Israel) Doron Jamchi	28.1
EuroBasket 1987	(Greece) Nikos Galis	(Greece) Nikos Galis (2)	37.0
EuroBasket 1989	(Socialist Federal Republic of Yugoslavia) Dražen Petrović	(Greece) Nikos Galis (3)	35.6
EuroBasket 1991	(Socialist Federal Republic of Yugoslavia) Toni Kukoč	(Greece) Nikos Galis (4)	32.6
EuroBasket 1993	(Germany) Chris Welp	(Bosnia and Herzegovina) Sabahudin Bilalović	24.1
EuroBasket 1995	(Lithuania) Šarūnas Marčiulionis	(Lithuania) Šarūnas Marčiulionis	22.5
EuroBasket 1997	(Federal Republic of Yugoslavia) Saša Đorđević	(Israel) Oded Kattash	22.0
EuroBasket 1999	(Italy) Gregor Fučka	(Spain) Alberto Herreros	19.2
EuroBasket 2001	(Federal Republic of Yugoslavia) Peja Stojaković	(Germany) Dirk Nowitzki	28.7
EuroBasket 2003	(Lithuania) Šarūnas Jasikevičius	(Spain) Pau Gasol	25.8
EuroBasket 2005	(Germany) Dirk Nowitzki	(Germany) Dirk Nowitzki (2)	26.1
EuroBasket 2007	(Russia) Andrei Kirilenko	(Germany) Dirk Nowitzki (3)	24.0
EuroBasket 2009	(Spain) Pau Gasol	(Spain) Pau Gasol (2)	18.7
EuroBasket 2011	(Spain) Juan Carlos Navarro	(France) Tony Parker	22.1
EuroBasket 2013	(France) Tony Parker	(France) Tony Parker (2)	19.0
EuroBasket 2015	(Spain) Pau Gasol (2)	(Spain) Pau Gasol (3)	25.6
EuroBasket 2017	(Slovenia) Goran Dragić	(Russia) Alexey Shved	24.3
EuroBasket 2022	(Spain) Willy Hernangómez	(Greece) Giannis Antetokounmpo	29.3
EuroBasket 2025	(Germany) Dennis Schröder	(Slovenia) Luka Dončić	34.7

== All-time leading scorers in total points scored ==
- Counting all games played through the end of EuroBasket 2025, and not counting qualification games.

List of All-Time Top 10 Scorers (Overall)
Rank	Player	Points Scored	Games Played	Scoring Average
1	(Spain) Pau Gasol	1,183	58	20.4
2	(France) Tony Parker	1,104	66	16.7
3	(Germany) Dirk Nowitzki	1,052	54	19.5
4	(Greece) Nikos Galis	1,031	33	31.2
5	(Czechoslovakia) Kamil Brabenec	918	60	15.3
6	(Israel) Miki Berkovich	917	49	18.7
7	(Spain) Juan Antonio San Epifanio	894	52	17.2
8	(Spain) Emiliano Rodríguez	864	53	16.3
9	(Socialist Federal Republic of Yugoslavia) Radivoj Korać	844	34	24.8
10	(Greece) Panagiotis Giannakis	769	58	13.3

== All-time leading scorers in points per game average ==
- Counting all games played through the end of EuroBasket 2025, and not counting qualification games.

List of All-Time Top 10 Scorers (By Average)
Rank	Player	Points Scored	Games Played	Scoring Average
1	(Greece) Nikos Galis	1,031	33	31.2
2	(Bulgaria) Aleksandar Vezenkov	134	5	26.8
3	(Socialist Federal Republic of Yugoslavia) Radivoj Korać	844	34	24.8
4	(South Sudan) (United Kingdom) Luol Deng	123	5	24.6
5	(Belgium) Eddy Terrace	220	9	24.4
6	(Bosnia and Herzegovina) Sabahudin Bilalović	217	9	24.1
6	(Slovenia) Luka Dončić	554	23	24.1
8	(Finland) Lauri Markkanen	520	22	23.6
9	(Socialist Federal Republic of Yugoslavia) Dražen Petrović	603	26	23.2
10	(United States) (Poland) Jordan Loyd	157	7	22.4

== Most points scored in a single game ==
- All statistics are correct as of EuroBasket 2025.

Game Won
Game Lost

List of players who have scored more than 40 points in a single game
Rank	Player	Points Scored	Opponent	Score	Year
1	(Belgium) Eddy Terrace	63	Albania	90–48	1957
2	(Slovenia) Luka Dončić	47	France	88–82	2022
3	(Greece) Nikos Galis	46	Sweden	102–97	1983
4	(Greece) Nikos Galis	45	Soviet Union	81–80	1989
5	(Israel) Miki Berkovich	44	Turkey	101–77	1975
5	(Israel) Doron Jamchi	44	Romania	97–87	1987
5	(Greece) Nikos Galis	44	Romania	109–77	1987
5	(Greece) Nikos Galis	44	Yugoslavia	84–78	1987
5	(Bosnia and Herzegovina) Nenad Marković	44	Latvia	96–94	1997
10	(Spain) Emiliano Rodríguez	43	Netherlands	79–71	1967
10	(Greece) Giorgos Kolokithas	43	Spain	95–99	1967
10	(Greece) Nikos Galis	43	Bulgaria	103–73	1989
10	(Germany) Dirk Nowitzki	43	Spain	90–99	2001
10	(Finland) Lauri Markkanen	43	Croatia	94–86	2022
10	(Finland) Lauri Markkanen	43	Great Britain	109–79	2025
16	(Socialist Federal Republic of Yugoslavia) Ladislav Demšar	42	Albania	90–13	1947
16	(Romania) Costel Cernat	42	Israel	105–119	1975
16	(Slovenia) Luka Dončić	42	Italy	84–77	2025
19	(Federal Republic of Yugoslavia) Aleksandar Đorđević	41	Lithuania °	96–90	1995
19	(Greece) Giannis Antetokounmpo	41	Ukraine	99–79	2022

° Performed in the Finals

== All-time leaders in games played ==
- Counting all games played through the end of EuroBasket 2017

List of All-Time Leaders By Games Played
Player	Games Played	Number of Tournaments	Years played
(Israel) Yaniv Green	99	8	2001, 2003, 2005, 2007, 2009, 2011, 2013, 2015
(North Macedonia) Todor Gečevski	91	9	1997, 1999, 2001, 2003, 2005, 2007, 2009, 2011, 2013
(France) Boris Diaw	87	8	2003, 2005, 2007, 2009, 2011, 2013, 2015, 2017
(Israel) Yotam Halperin	87	8	2003, 2005, 2007, 2009, 2011, 2013, 2015, 2017
(Latvia) Uvis Helmanis	84	8	1995, 1997, 1999, 2001, 2003, 2005, 2007, 2009
(Finland) Tuukka Kotti	82	9	2001, 2003, 2005, 2007, 2009, 2011, 2013, 2015, 2017
(France) Florent Piétrus	82	7	2003, 2005, 2007, 2009, 2011, 2013, 2015
(Czech Republic) Jiří Welsch	81	9	1999, 2001, 2003, 2005, 2007, 2009, 2013, 2015, 2017
(Israel) Ido Kozikaro	79	6	2001, 2003, 2005, 2007, 2009, 2013
(Georgia (country)) Zaza Pachulia	79	8	2003, 2005, 2007, 2009, 2011, 2013, 2015, 2017
(France) Tony Parker	79	8	2001, 2003, 2005, 2007, 2009, 2011, 2013, 2015

== Triple-doubles ==
Only six players have recorded a triple-double (at least 10+ in three statistical categories).

Player	Points Scored	Rebounds	Assists	Blocks	Opponent	Score	Year
(Croatia) Stojko Vranković	12	13	–	10	Greece	90–48	1993
(Croatia) Toni Kukoč	15	12	11	–	Finland	92–77	1995
(Romania) Rareș Mandache	14	11	10	–	Montenegro	69–86	2017
(Poland) Mateusz Ponitka	26	16	10	–	Slovenia	90–87	2022
(Slovenia) Luka Dončić	26	10	11	–	Belgium	86–69	2025
(Turkey) Alperen Şengün	19	12	10	–	Poland	91–77	2025

== Top medalists ==
- Through the end of EuroBasket 2025.
- Minimum 5 total medals, or 4 gold medals won.

List of All-Time EuroBasket Medalists
Player	Gold Medals	Silver Medals	Bronze Medals	Total Medals
(Soviet Union) Gennadi Volnov	6 (1959, 1961, 1963, 1965, 1967, 1969)	0	0	6
(Soviet Union) Sergei Belov	4 (1967, 1969, 1971, 1979)	2 (1975, 1977)	1 (1973)	7
(Spain) Rudy Fernández	4 (2009, 2011, 2015, 2022)	1 (2007)	1 (2013)	6
(Socialist Federal Republic of Yugoslavia) / (Federal Republic of Yugoslavia) Predrag Danilović	4 (1989, 1991, 1995, 1997)	0	1 (1999)	5
(Soviet Union) Modestas Paulauskas	4 (1965, 1967, 1969, 1971)	0	1 (1973)	5
(Soviet Union) Zurab Sakandelidze	4 (1965, 1967, 1969, 1971)	0	1 (1973)	5
(Soviet Union) Armenak Alachachian	4 (1953, 1961, 1963, 1965)	0	0	4
(Soviet Union) Aleksandr Petrov	4 (1959, 1961, 1963, 1965)	0	0	4
(Socialist Federal Republic of Yugoslavia) Krešimir Ćosić	3 (1973, 1975, 1977)	3 (1969, 1971, 1981)	1 (1979)	7
(Spain) Pau Gasol	3 (2009, 2011, 2015)	2 (2003, 2007)	2 (2001, 2017)	7
(Spain) Felipe Reyes	3 (2009, 2011, 2015)	2 (2003, 2007)	1 (2001)	6
(Socialist Federal Republic of Yugoslavia) Vinko Jelovac	3 (1973, 1975, 1977)	2 (1969, 1971)	0	5
(Soviet Union) Vladimir Tkachenko	3 (1979, 1981, 1985)	2 (1977, 1987)	0	5
(Soviet Union) Alexander Belostenny	3 (1979, 1981, 1985)	1 (1977)	2 (1983, 1989)	6
(Socialist Federal Republic of Yugoslavia) Dražen Dalipagić	3 (1973, 1975, 1977)	1 (1981)	1 (1979)	5
(Socialist Federal Republic of Yugoslavia) Dragan Kićanović	3 (1973, 1975, 1977)	1 (1981)	1 (1979)	5
(Soviet Union) Sergey Tarakanov	3 (1979, 1981, 1985)	1 (1987)	1 (1983)	5
(Socialist Federal Republic of Yugoslavia) / (Federal Republic of Yugoslavia) Vlade Divac	3 (1989, 1991, 1995)	0	2 (1987, 1999)	5
(Soviet Union) / (Lithuania) Valdemaras Chomičius	2 (1979, 1985)	2 (1987, 1995)	2 (1983, 1989)	6
(Spain) Juan Carlos Navarro	2 (2009, 2011)	2 (2003, 2007)	2 (2001, 2017)	6
(Spain) Marc Gasol	2 (2009, 2011)	1 (2007)	2 (2013, 2017)	5
(Socialist Federal Republic of Yugoslavia) / (Croatia) Dino Rađa	2 (1989, 1991)	0	3 (1987, 1993, 1995)	5

== See also ==
- FIBA EuroBasket
- FIBA EuroBasket MVP
- FIBA EuroBasket All-Tournament Team
- FIBA EuroBasket All-time leading scorers in total points scored
- FIBA World Cup
- FIBA World Cup Records
- FIBA World Cup MVP
- FIBA World Cup All-Tournament Team
- FIBA's 50 Greatest Players (1991)
