= FIBA EuroBasket All-time leading scorers in total points scored =

The FIBA EuroBasket All-time leading scorers in total points scored are the basketball players with the most total points scored in the FIBA EuroBasket.

== All-time leading scorers in total points scored ==
- Counting all games played through the end of EuroBasket 2025, and not counting qualification games.

List of All-Time Scorers (Overall)
Player	Points Scored	Games Played	Scoring Average
(Spain) Pau Gasol	1,183	58	20.4
(France) Tony Parker	1,104	66	16.7
(Germany) Dirk Nowitzki	1,052	54	19.5
(Greece) Nikos Galis	1,031	33	31.2
(Czechoslovakia) Kamil Brabenec	918	60	15.3
(Israel) Miki Berkovich	917	49	18.7
(Spain) Juan Antonio San Epifanio	894	52	17.2
(Spain) Emiliano Rodríguez	864	53	16.3
(Socialist Federal Republic of Yugoslavia) Radivoj Korać	844	34	24.8
(Greece) Panagiotis Giannakis	769	58	13.3
(Spain) Juan Carlos Navarro	768	53	14.5
(Czechoslovakia) Stanislav Kropilák	760	54	14.1
(Soviet Union) Sergei Belov	727	51	14.3
(France) Stéphane Ostrowski	706	43	16.4
(Poland) Dariusz Zelig	703	41	17.1
(Slovenia) Goran Dragić	696	51	13.6
(Spain) Wayne Brabender	684	42	16.3
(Socialist Federal Republic of Yugoslavia) Krešimir Ćosić	672	59	11.4
(Socialist Federal Republic of Yugoslavia) Dragan Kićanović	662	40	16.6
(Israel) Doron Jamchi	659	31	21.3
(France) Hervé Dubuisson	657	47	14.0
(Soviet Union) / (Lithuania) Arvydas Sabonis	652	36	18.1
(Russia) Andrei Kirilenko	650	38	17.1
(Italy) Dino Meneghin	638	57	11.2
(Germany) Dennis Schröder	631	29	21.8
(Socialist Federal Republic of Yugoslavia) Dražen Dalipagić	623	43	14.5
(Finland) Timo Lampén	621	51	12.2
(Bulgaria) Atanas Golomeev	611	32	19.1
(Turkey) Hedo Türkoğlu	607	54	11.2
(Spain) Francisco Buscato	607	54	11.2
(Socialist Federal Republic of Yugoslavia) Dražen Petrović	603	26	23.2
(Bulgaria) Iliya Mirchev	592	49	12.1
(Czechoslovakia) Jiří Zídek	588	44	13.4
(Lithuania) Jonas Valančiūnas	585	48	12.2
(France) Boris Diaw	581	73	8.0
(Soviet Union) Modestas Paulauskas	572	39	14.7
(Croatia) Bojan Bogdanović	559	33	16.9
(Slovenia) Luka Dončić	554	23	24.1
(Romania) Dragos Nosievici	554	50	11.1
(Spain) Rudy Fernández	547	61	9.0
(Spain) Alberto Herreros	538	41	13.1
(Italy) Marco Belinelli	528	35	15.1
(France) Alain Gilles	526	39	13.5
(Turkey) İbrahim Kutluay	526	43	12.2
(Finland) Lauri Markkanen	520	22	23.6
(Spain) Marc Gasol	520	49	10.6
(Socialist Federal Republic of Yugoslavia) Ivo Daneu	515	50	10.3
(Romania) Armand Novacek	512	35	14.6
(Hungary) László Gabányi	510	49	10.4
(Bulgaria) Viktor Radev	509	44	11.6
(Slovenia) Jaka Lakovič	509	57	8.9
(Poland) Janusz Wichowski	504	45	11.2
(Czechoslovakia) František Konvička	496	43	11.5
(Lithuania) Artūras Karnišovas	492	27	18.2
(Finland) Raimo Lindholm	489	51	9.6
(Greece) Giorgos Kolokithas	488	25	19.5
(Spain) Andrés Jiménez	484	36	13.4
(Czechoslovakia) Ivan Mrázek	483	39	12.4
(Romania) Mihai Nedef	483	60	8.1
(Poland) Mieczysław Młynarski	482	22	21.9
(Soviet Union) Valdis Valters	476	32	14.9
(Greece) Panagiotis Fasoulas	473	43	11.0
(Israel) Boaz Janay	472	41	11.5
(Italy) Antonello Riva	469	24	19.5
(Greece) Ioannis Bourousis	468	53	8.9
(Israel) Tanhum Cohen-Mintz	467	35	13.3
(Bulgaria) Georgi Christov	464	36	12.9
(Socialist Federal Republic of Yugoslavia) / (Croatia) Dino Rađa	462	31	14.9
(Serbia) Nenad Krstić	461	33	14.0
(Czechoslovakia) Miroslav Škeřík	461	46	10.0
(Spain) Cándido Sibilio	454	31	14.6
(Czechoslovakia) Jaroslav Šíp	453	44	10.3
(Hungary) Tibor Zsíros	451	37	12.2
(France) Richard Dacoury	449	31	14.5
(Greece) Nikos Zisis	449	51	8.8
(Italy) Renato Villalta	448	39	11.5
(Italy) Massimo Masini	447	40	11.2
(Greece) Giannis Antetokounmpo	445	21	21.2
(Czechoslovakia) Zdeněk Kos	445	44	10.1
(Belgium) Rene Aerts	444	33	13.5
(Germany) Patrick Femerling	441	56	7.9
(Federal Republic of Yugoslavia) Dejan Bodiroga	440	37	11.9
(France) Antoine Rigaudeau	440	38	11.6
(France) Nicolas Batum	436	39	11.2
(Romania) Mihai Albu	436	45	9.7
(Lithuania) Mantas Kalnietis	434	40	10.9
(Soviet Union) Anatoly Myshkin	433	37	11.7
(Poland) Edward Jurkiewicz	432	21	20.6
(Greece) Vassilis Spanoulis	429	38	11.3
(Czechoslovakia) Jiří Baumruk	429	42	10.2
(Russia) Vasily Karasev	423	41	10.3
(France) Nando de Colo	419	46	9.1
(Soviet Union) Vladimir Tkachenko	418	36	11.6
(Finland) Seppo Kuusela	417	37	11.3
(Bulgaria) Rouman Peitchev	416	34	12.2
(France) Jacques Cachemire	416	38	10.9
(Poland) Mieczysław Łopatka	412	27	15.3
(Finland) Sasu Salin	412	44	9.4
(Soviet Union) Gennadi Volnov	412	44	9.4
(Czechoslovakia) Jiří Pospíšil	411	33	12.5
(Turkey) Cedi Osman	408	27	15.1
(Bulgaria) Georgi Panov	408	44	9.3
(Lithuania) Šarūnas Jasikevičius	405	45	9.0
(Socialist Federal Republic of Yugoslavia) / (Federal Republic of Yugoslavia) Predrag Danilović	403	33	12.2
(Poland) Bohdan Likszo	401	33	12.2
(Russia) Vitaly Fridzon	401	42	9.5
(Romania) Costel Cernat	400	26	15.4
(Czechoslovakia) Jaroslav Tetiva	400	53	7.5
(Soviet Union) / (Lithuania) Šarūnas Marčiulionis	395	20	19.8
(Russia) Aleksei Shved	395	25	15.8
(Finland) Petteri Koponen	395	35	11.3
(Italy) Pierluigi Marzorati	392	45	8.7
(Germany) Ademola Okulaja	390	42	9.3
(Turkey) Yalçın Granit	386	25	15.4
(Israel) Lior Eliyahu	386	26	14.8
(Serbia) Bogdan Bogdanović	385	31	12.4
(Serbia) Miloš Teodosić	384	32	12.0
(Socialist Federal Republic of Yugoslavia) / (Croatia) Toni Kukoč	381	31	12.3

== All-time leading scorers in points per game average ==
- Counting all games played through the end of EuroBasket 2025, and not counting qualification games.

List of All-Time Top 20 Scorers (By Average)
Rank	Player	Points Scored	Games Played	Scoring Average
1	(Greece) Nikos Galis	1,031	33	31.2
2	(Bulgaria) Aleksandar Vezenkov	134	5	26.8
3	(Socialist Federal Republic of Yugoslavia) Radivoj Korać	844	34	24.8
4	(South Sudan) (United Kingdom) Luol Deng	123	5	24.6
5	(Belgium) Eddy Terrace	220	9	24.4
6	(Slovenia) Luka Dončić	554	23	24.1
6	(Bosnia and Herzegovina) Sabahudin Bilalović	217	9	24.1
8	(Finland) Lauri Markkanen	520	22	23.6
9	(Socialist Federal Republic of Yugoslavia) Dražen Petrović	603	26	23.2
10	(United States) (Poland) Jordan Loyd	157	7	22.4
11	(Netherlands) Rik Smits	154	7	22.0
11	(Serbia) Nikola Jokić	264	12	22.0
11	(Latvia) Kristaps Porziņģis	286	13	22.0
14	(Poland) Mieczysław Młynarski	482	22	21.9
15	(Germany) Dennis Schröder	631	29	21.8
16	(Germany) Michael Jackel	347	16	21.7
17	(Bosnia and Herzegovina) Džanan Musa	107	5	21.4
18	(Israel) Doron Jamchi	659	31	21.3
19	(Greece) Giannis Antetokounmpo	445	21	21.2
20	(Poland) Edward Jurkiewicz	432	21	20.6

== See also ==
- FIBA EuroBasket
- FIBA EuroBasket Records
- FIBA EuroBasket MVP
- FIBA EuroBasket All-Tournament Team
- FIBA EuroBasket Top Scorer
- FIBA World Cup
- FIBA World Cup Records
- FIBA World Cup MVP
- FIBA World Cup All-Tournament Team
- FIBA Awards
- FIBA's 50 Greatest Players (1991)
