= EuroBasket =

European men's basketball tournament for national teams

- Most recent season or competition: EuroBasket 2025
- Sport: Basketball
- Founded: 1935; 91 years ago
- First season: 1935
- Organising body: FIBA Europe
- No. of teams: 24
- Countries: FIBA Europe member associations
- Continent: Europe
- Most recent champions: Germany (2nd title)
- Most titles: Soviet Union (14 titles)
- Related competitions: FIBA European Championship for Small Countries; EuroBasket Women
- Website: EuroBasket; FIBA Europe

EuroBasket, also commonly called the European Basketball Championship, is the main international basketball competition for the senior men's national teams of primarily European countries. It is held every four years and organised by FIBA Europe, the European zone of FIBA, the International Basketball Federation.

The competition was first held in 1935. The former Soviet Union holds the record for most gold medals with 14. The tournament is generally held in August or September, in the offseason of major club competitions. The current champion is Germany, who won the 2025 title.

== History ==
=== Beginning ===
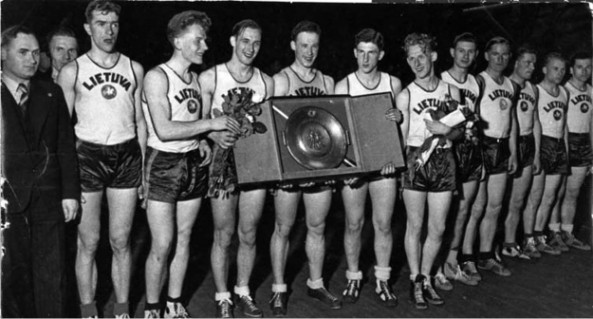
Lithuania celebrating winning the EuroBasket 1937

The first championships was held three years after the establishment of FIBA, in 1935. Switzerland was chosen as the host country, and ten countries joined. Only one qualifying match was played between Portugal and Spain. With a complicated formula, the final would see Latvia as champions. According to the rule at the time, the winner had to hold the following games. The following two tournaments would be won by Lithuania and would see the introduction of Egypt who would compete in EuroBasket until 1953 winning one championship at home in 1949 along the way. The 1941 edition of the tournament was scheduled be held in Lithuania as well, but was cancelled due to WWII.

=== Soviet dominance ===
After the 1946 edition saw the first jump shot performed by Italian player Giuseppe Stefanini, the following edition would see the Soviet Union compete in their first edition in the 1947 edition and would see the Soviets win the first of eleven out of the next thirteen European championships. During the 50s, the Soviet Union won four of the five competitions held during the decade with the only tournament that they did not win being the 1955 edition. This was won by Hungary as they finished top while the Soviets finished in third place. It was also during that edition that the thirty-second shot clock was introduced, which changed the style of basketball.

The Soviets would win all championships of the 60s. They had a fifty-five game winning streak which would be broken by Yugoslavia in 1969. The 1960s would see also a change in how the competition was viewed and run with FIBA putting a limit on the number of countries that entered to 16 with qualifiers being the way to bring them down to that number as it first appeared in 1963. The following edition would see the competition not be held in one city with Tbilisi joining Moscow in hosting games and in 1967 the first modern games were held, because the games were televised and international media were present.

=== Rise of Yugoslavia ===
The 1970s were the competition between Yugoslavia and the Soviet Union. During the decade Yugoslavia won three gold medals and the Soviet Union taking out the remaining two. After the Soviets won 1971, the 1973 edition would finally see Yugoslavia win their first championship after Spain defeated the Soviets in the semi-finals to qualify for their first final since the first edition way back in 1935. Yugoslavia would finally have a chance to defeat the Soviets as at home, they would get the chance to defeat them and they did as they won by six points to take home 1975 edition. After following that up in 1977, the Soviets would get their revenge in the final round at EuroBasket 1979 when they defeated them 96–77 to qualify through to the final where they would defeat Israel who shocked the basketball world as they defeated Yugoslavia in the opening round by a point.

Brewing under the Soviets and Yugoslavs, Western Europe was starting to appear with the 1980s seeing the change happen. In 1983, the Western side of Europe tasted success with Italy defeating Spain in the final to record their first of two titles. An important development happened in the following edition which was held in Germany. That edition saw the first three-point arc being used.

=== New winners emerge and Spanish dominance ===
Greece would win the next edition in 1987 at home after remarkable victory over heavily favored Soviet Union, with a 103–101 score in a gripping final decided in overtime. At the 1989 edition, Greece beat the Soviet team again in the semifinals with a one-point margin but then lost to hosts Yugoslavia in the final. EuroBasket 1991 was the first EuroBasket tournament in which currently active NBA players, that had also already played in an official NBA regular season game were allowed to participate. It would also be the first edition where the Soviets weren't entered into the competition, as the USSR didn't qualify for the main tournament and afterwards collapsed. Yugoslavia would take the title, but afterwards war would split the country up with Jure Zdovc being a "casualty" after Slovenia declared independence, two days into the tournament. 1993 saw a shock winner, with Germany taking the championship at home with a one-point victory over Russia. After being suspended in 1993, FR Yugoslavia came back and took the trophy after defeating Lithuania who was making its first appearance, since it had been a Soviet Republic. But politics came into play with the crowd protesting "Lithuania is the champions", while the Croatian team who had defeated Greece for bronze step down from the podium in protest of the war that was happening at the time. Nevertheless, FR Yugoslavia managed to repeat their success in 1997 after victory over Italy in the final match.

Italy managed to win the last title of the 20th century, defeating Spain in the 1999 final. In 2001, FR Yugoslavia regained European title but it was their last victory at the EuroBasket. In 2003, Lithuania defeated Spain in the final match and won their first European trophy since 1939. In 2005, Greece repeated success of 1987 after beating Germany in the final match.

2007 saw a shock winner, with Russia taking their first EuroBasket title since the dissolution of the Soviet Union with a one-point victory over heavily favored Spanish hosts in Madrid. However, the next tournaments were dominated by Spain who finally gained their maiden European title in 2009 and then won 3 of 5 next editions. In 2013, France won their first European title. In 2017, Slovenia won the trophy, becoming the 14th country to win the EuroBasket. But in general, the first decades of the 21st century have been characterized by the dominance of Spanish team who has reached at least the semifinals of the 11 last tournaments, obtaining at these editions a total of four gold, three silver and three bronze medals, including the current title of 2022.

== Qualification ==
24 European teams take part in the final competition. The qualification format that existed until the 2011 EuroBasket permitted 16 teams to compete. Eight spots were determined by the host nation and the top seven finishers of the previous EuroBasket. The remaining Division A teams compete in a qualification tournament. There, they were divided into four groups. Each group played a double round-robin. The top team in each group qualified for EuroBasket. The best three of the four runners-up also qualified.

Of the ten teams that did not qualify in the qualification tournament, the six best got another chance in the additional qualification round. The remaining four competed in a relegation round, with two being sent to Division B for the next qualification cycle (and replaced by the two best teams from Division B).

The final spot was determined by the additional qualifying round. The six teams were divided into two groups of three, with each group playing a double round-robin. The top team in each group played in the final against the other group's top team; the winner of that game received the final EuroBasket qualification spot.

In 2015, the national team of Iceland became the smallest nation to ever qualify for a EuroBasket final stage at the population of around 330.000 people. The team was led by the former Dallas Maverick, Jón Arnór Stefánsson followed by a great performance which drove them through the qualifiers. In 2017, Iceland made back to back qualification to a EuroBasket final stage, then led by the young Martin Hermannsson.

== Competition format ==
EuroBasket has used a number of different formats, ranging from the simple round-robin used in 1939, to a three-stage tournament, and now a two-stage tournament that is currently in use.

The current format begins with a preliminary round. The twenty-four qualified teams are placed into four groups of six, and each group plays a round-robin tournament. The top four teams in each group (16 overall) advance to the knockout stage. The knockout stage is a 16-team single-elimination tournament, with a bronze medal game for semi-final losers and classification games for the quarterfinal losers to determine fifth to eighth places.

== Results ==
#	Year	Hosts	Gold medal game			Bronze medal game			Teams
#	Year	Hosts	Gold	Score	Silver	Bronze	Score	Fourth place	Teams
1	1935	Switzerland	Latvia	24–18	Spain	Czechoslovakia	25–23	Switzerland	10
2	1937	Latvia	Lithuania	24–23	Italy	France	27–24	Poland	8
3	1939	Lithuania	Lithuania	No playoffs	Latvia	Poland	No playoffs	France	8
-	1941	Lithuania	Cancelled due to World War II						
4	1946	Switzerland	Czechoslovakia	34–32	Italy	Hungary	38–32	France	10
5	1947	Czechoslovakia	Soviet Union	56–37	Czechoslovakia	Egypt	50–48	Belgium	14
6	1949	Egypt	Egypt	No playoffs	France	Greece	No playoffs	Turkey	7
7	1951	France	Soviet Union	45–44	Czechoslovakia	France	55–52	Bulgaria	18
8	1953	USSR	Soviet Union	No playoffs	Hungary	France	No playoffs	Czechoslovakia	17
9	1955	Hungary	Hungary	No playoffs	Czechoslovakia	Soviet Union	No playoffs	Bulgaria	18
10	1957	Bulgaria	Soviet Union	No playoffs	Bulgaria	Czechoslovakia	No playoffs	Hungary	16
11	1959	Turkey	Soviet Union	No playoffs	Czechoslovakia	France	No playoffs	Hungary	17
12	1961	Yugoslavia	Soviet Union	60–53	Yugoslavia	Bulgaria	55–46	France	19
13	1963	Poland	Soviet Union	61–45	Poland	Yugoslavia	89–61	Hungary	16
14	1965	Soviet Union	Soviet Union	58–49	Yugoslavia	Poland	86–70	Italy	16
15	1967	Finland	Soviet Union	89–77	Czechoslovakia	Poland	80–76	Bulgaria	16
16	1969	Italy	Soviet Union	81–72	Yugoslavia	Czechoslovakia	77–75	Poland	12
17	1971	West Germany	Soviet Union	69–64	Yugoslavia	Italy	85–67	Poland	12
18	1973	Spain	Yugoslavia	78–67	Spain	Soviet Union	90–58	Czechoslovakia	12
19	1975	Yugoslavia	Yugoslavia	No playoffs	Soviet Union	Italy	No playoffs	Spain	12
20	1977	Belgium	Yugoslavia	74–61	Soviet Union	Czechoslovakia	91–81	Italy	12
21	1979	Italy	Soviet Union	98–76	Israel	Yugoslavia	99–92	Czechoslovakia	12
22	1981	Czechoslovakia	Soviet Union	84–67	Yugoslavia	Czechoslovakia	101–90	Spain	12
23	1983	France	Italy	105–96	Spain	Soviet Union	105–70	Netherlands	12
24	1985	West Germany	Soviet Union	120–89	Czechoslovakia	Italy	102–90	Spain	12
25	1987	Greece	Greece	103–101 overtime	Soviet Union	Yugoslavia	98–87	Spain	12
26	1989	Yugoslavia	Yugoslavia	98–77	Greece	Soviet Union	104–76	Italy	8
27	1991	Italy	Yugoslavia	88–73	Italy	Spain	101–83	France	8
28	1993	Germany	Germany	71–70	Russia	Croatia	99–59	Greece	16
29	1995	Greece	FR Yugoslavia	96–90	Lithuania	Croatia	73–68	Greece	14
30	1997	Spain	FR Yugoslavia	61–49	Italy	Russia	97–77	Greece	16
31	1999	France	Italy	64–56	Spain	FR Yugoslavia	74–62	France	16
32	2001	Turkey	FR Yugoslavia	78–69	Turkey	Spain	99–90	Germany	16
33	2003	Sweden	Lithuania	93–84	Spain	Italy	69–67	France	16
34	2005	Serbia and Montenegro	Greece	78–62	Germany	France	98–68	Spain	16
35	2007	Spain	Russia	60–59	Spain	Lithuania	78–69	Greece	16
36	2009	Poland	Spain	85–63	Serbia	Greece	57–56	Slovenia	16
37	2011	Lithuania	Spain	98–85	France	Russia	72–68	Macedonia	24
38	2013	Slovenia	France	80–66	Lithuania	Spain	92–66	Croatia	24
39	2015	France; Croatia; Germany; Latvia	Spain	80–63	Lithuania	France	81–68	Serbia	24
40	2017	Finland; Israel; Romania; Turkey	Slovenia	93–85	Serbia	Spain	93–85	Russia	24
41	2022	Czech Republic; Georgia; Italy; Germany	Spain	88–76	France	Germany	82–69	Poland	24
42	2025	Cyprus; Finland; Poland; Latvia	Germany	88–83	Turkey	Greece	92–89	Finland	24
43	2029	Estonia; Greece; Slovenia; Spain							24

== Medal table ==
The medal table below lists the national teams according to the respective table published by FIBA.

- Countries in italics no longer compete at the EuroBasket.

Rank	Nation (Note: FIBA lists the entries independently both in their results tables and medal tables.) (Note: According to FIBA, Yugoslavia competed until 2002.)	Gold	Silver	Bronze	Total
1	Soviet Union	14	3	4	21
2	Yugoslavia / FR Yugoslavia	8	5	4	17
3	Spain	4	6	4	14
4	Lithuania	3	3	1	7
5	Italy	2	4	4	10
6	Greece	2	1	3	6
7	Germany	2	1	1	4
8	Czechoslovakia	1	6	5	12
9	France	1	3	6	10
10	Russia	1	1	2	4
11	Hungary	1	1	1	3
12	Latvia	1	1	0	2
13	Egypt	1	0	1	2
14	Slovenia	1	0	0	1
15	Serbia	0	2	0	2
15	Turkey	0	2	0	2
17	Poland	0	1	3	4
18	Bulgaria	0	1	1	2
19	Israel	0	1	0	1
20	Croatia	0	0	2	2
Totals (20 entries)		42	42	42	126

== Participating nations ==
Team	(Switzerland); 1935	(Latvia); 1937	(Lithuania); 1939	(Switzerland); 1946	(Czech Republic); 1947	(Egypt); 1949	(France); 1951	(Soviet Union); 1953	(Hungary); 1955	(Bulgaria); 1957	(Turkey); 1959	(Socialist Federal Republic of Yugoslavia); 1961	(Poland); 1963	(Soviet Union); 1965	(Finland); 1967	(Italy); 1969	(West Germany); 1971	(Spain); 1973	(Socialist Federal Republic of Yugoslavia); 1975	(Belgium); 1977	(Italy); 1979
Albania	-	-	-	-	14th	-	-	-	-	16th	-	-	-	-	-	-	-	-	-	-	-
Austria	-	-	-	-	12th	-	11th	-	13th	14th	16th	-	-	-	-	-	-	-	-	12th	-
Belgium	6th	-	-	7th	4th	-	7th	10th	-	12th	7th	8th	8th	-	15th	-	-	-	-	8th	12th
Bosnia and Herzegovina	Part of Yugoslavia																				
Bulgaria	8th	-	-	-	8th	-	4th	9th	4th	2nd	5th	3rd	5th	5th	4th	7th	6th	6th	5th	6th	11th
Croatia	Part of Yugoslavia																				
Cyprus	-	-	-	-	-	-	-	-	-	-	-	-	-	-	-	-	-	-	-	-	-
Czech Republic	Part of Czechoslovakia																				
Czechoslovakia	3rd	7th	-	1st	2nd	-	2nd	4th	2nd	3rd	2nd	5th	10th	7th	2nd	3rd	5th	4th	6th	3rd	4th
Denmark	-	-	-	-	-	-	14th	16th	18th	-	-	-	-	-	-	-	-	-	-	-	-
East Germany	X	X	X	X	X	X	-	-	-	-	14th	12th	6th	10th	14th	-	-	-	-	-	-
Egypt	-	8th	-	-	3rd	1st	-	8th	-	-	-	-	-	-	-	-	-	-	-	-	-
England	-	-	-	10th	-	-	-	-	12th	-	-	19th	-	-	-	-	-	-	-	-	-
Estonia	-	5th	5th	Part of Soviet Union																	
Finland	-	-	8th	-	-	-	9th	12th	10th	11th	13th	14th	14th	12th	6th	-	-	-	-	10th	-
France	5th	3rd	4th	4th	5th	2nd	3rd	3rd	9th	8th	3rd	4th	13th	9th	11th	-	10th	10th	-	11th	8th
Georgia	Part of Soviet Union																				
West Germany/ Germany	-	-	-	-	-	-	12th	14th	17th	13th	-	16th	-	14th	-	-	9th	-	-	-	-
Great Britain	-	-	-	-	-	-	-	-	-	-	-	-	-	-	-	-	-	-	-	-	-
Greece	-	-	-	-	-	3rd	8th	-	-	-	-	17th	-	8th	12th	10th	-	11th	12th	-	9th
Hungary	9th	-	7th	3rd	7th	-	-	2nd	1st	4th	4th	6th	4th	15th	13th	8th	-	-	-	-	-
Iceland	-	-	-	-	-	-	-	-	-	-	-	-	-	-	-	-	-	-	-	-	-
Iran	-	-	-	-	-	-	-	-	-	-	17th	-	-	-	-	-	-	-	-	-	-
Israel	X	X	X	X	X	-	-	5th	-	-	11th	11th	9th	6th	8th	11th	11th	7th	7th	5th	2nd
Italy	7th	2nd	6th	2nd	9th	-	5th	7th	6th	10th	10th	-	12th	4th	7th	6th	3rd	5th	3rd	4th	5th
Latvia	1st	6th	2nd	Part of Soviet Union																	
Lebanon	-	-	-	-	-	7th	-	15th	-	-	-	-	-	-	-	-	-	-	-	-	-
Lithuania	-	1st	1st	Part of Soviet Union																	
Luxembourg	-	-	-	8th	-	-	17th	-	15th	-	-	-	-	-	-	-	-	-	-	-	-
Montenegro	Part of Yugoslavia																				
Netherlands	-	-	-	6th	11th	5th	10th	-	-	-	-	15th	16th	-	16th	-	-	-	10th	7th	10th
North Macedonia	Part of Yugoslavia																				
Poland	-	4th	3rd	9th	6th	-	-	-	5th	7th	6th	9th	2nd	3rd	3rd	4th	4th	12th	8th	-	7th
Portugal	-	-	-	-	-	-	15th	-	-	-	-	-	-	-	-	-	-	-	-	-	-
Romania	10th	-	-	-	10th	-	18th	13th	7th	5th	8th	7th	11th	13th	5th	9th	8th	9th	11th	-	-
Russia	Part of Soviet Union																				
Scotland	-	-	-	-	-	-	16th	-	-	15th	-	-	-	-	-	-	-	-	-	-	-
Serbia	Part of Yugoslavia																				
Serbia and Montenegro	Part of Yugoslavia																				
Slovenia	Part of Yugoslavia																				
Soviet Union	-	-	-	-	1st	-	1st	1st	3rd	1st	1st	1st	1st	1st	1st	1st	1st	3rd	2nd	2nd	1st
Spain	2nd	-	-	-	-	-	-	-	-	-	15th	13th	7th	11th	10th	5th	7th	2nd	4th	9th	6th
Sweden	-	-	-	-	-	-	-	17th	16th	-	-	18th	-	16th	-	12th	-	-	-	-	-
Switzerland	4th	-	-	5th	-	-	13th	11th	14th	-	-	-	-	-	-	-	-	-	-	-	-
Syria	-	-	-	-	-	6th	-	-	-	-	-	-	-	-	-	-	-	-	-	-	-
Turkey	-	-	-	-	-	4th	6th	-	11th	9th	12th	10th	15th	-	-	-	12th	8th	9th	-	-
Ukraine	Part of Soviet Union																				
Yugoslavia	-	-	-	-	13th	-	-	6th	8th	6th	9th	2nd	3rd	2nd	9th	2nd	2nd	1st	1st	1st	3rd
Total	10	8	8	10	14	7	18	17	18	16	17	19	16	16	16	12	12	12	12	12	12

Team	(Czechoslovakia); 1981	(France); 1983	(West Germany); 1985	(Greece); 1987	(Socialist Federal Republic of Yugoslavia); 1989	(Italy); 1991	(Germany); 1993	(Greece); 1995	(Spain); 1997	(France); 1999	(Turkey); 2001	(Sweden); 2003	(Serbia and Montenegro); 2005	(Spain); 2007	(Poland); 2009	(Lithuania); 2011	(Slovenia); 2013	(France) (Croatia) (Germany) (Latvia); 2015	(Turkey) (Finland) (Israel) (Romania); 2017	(Germany) (Czech Republic) (Georgia (country)) (Italy); 2022	(Latvia) (Cyprus) (Finland) (Poland); 2025	(Spain) (Estonia) (Greece) (Slovenia); 2029	Total
Albania	-	-	-	-	-	-	-	-	-	-	-	-	-	-	-	-	-	-	-	-	-		2
Austria	-	-	-	-	-	-	-	-	-	-	-	-	-	-	-	-	-	-	-	-	-		6
Belgium	-	-	-	-	-	-	12th	-	-	-	-	-	-	-	-	21st	9th	13th	19th	14th	18th		19
Bosnia and Herzegovina	Part of Yugoslavia						8th	-	15th	15th	13th	15th	13th	-	-	17th	13th	23rd	-	18th	13th		11
Bulgaria	-	-	8th	-	7th	8th	14th	-	-	-	-	-	13th	-	13th	13th	-	-	-	20th	-		25
Croatia	Part of Yugoslavia						3rd	3rd	11th	11th	7th	11th	7th	6th	6th	13th	4th	9th	10th	11th	-		14
Cyprus	-	-	-	-	-	-	-	-	-	-	-	-	-	-	-	-	-	-	-	-	24th		1
Czech Republic	Part of Czechoslovakia						-	-	-	12th	-	-	-	13th	-	-	13th	7th	20th	16th	23rd		7
Czechoslovakia	3rd	10th	2nd	8th	-	6th	X	X	X	X	X	X	X	X	X	X	X	X	X	X	X	X	24
Denmark	-	-	-	-	-	-	-	-	-	-	-	-	-	-	-	-	-	-	-	-	-		3
East Germany	-	-	-	-	-	X	X	X	X	X	X	X	X	X	X	X	X	X	X	X	X	X	5
Egypt	-	-	-	-	-	-	-	-	-	-	-	-	-	-	-	-	-	-	-	-	-	-	4
England	12th	-	-	-	-	-	-	-	-	-	-	-	-	-	-	-	-	-	-	-	-	-	4
Estonia	Part of Soviet Union					-	6th	-	-	-	14th	-	-	-	-	-	-	20th	-	19th	19th	Q	8
Finland	-	-	-	-	-	-	-	14th	-	-	-	-	-	-	-	9th	9th	16th	11th	8th	4th		18
France	8th	5th	6th	9th	6th	4th	7th	8th	10th	4th	6th	4th	3rd	8th	5th	2nd	1st	3rd	12th	2nd	9th		40
Georgia	Part of Soviet Union						-	-	-	-	-	-	-	-	-	11th	17th	15th	17th	21st	8th		6
West Germany/ Germany	10th	8th	5th	6th	-	-	1st	10th	12th	7th	4th	9th	2nd	5th	11th	9th	17th	18th	7th	3rd	1st	Q	26
Great Britain	-	-	-	-	-	-	-	-	-	-	-	-	-	-	13th	13th	13th	-	22nd	24th	21st		6
Greece	9th	11th	-	1st	2nd	5th	4th	4th	4th	16th	9th	5th	1st	4th	3rd	6th	11th	5th	8th	5th	3rd	Q	30
Hungary	-	-	-	-	-	-	-	-	-	14th	-	-	-	-	-	-	-	-	16th	23rd	-		16
Iceland	-	-	-	-	-	-	-	-	-	-	-	-	-	-	-	-	-	24th	24th	-	22nd		3
Iran	-	-	-	-	-	-	-	-	-	-	-	-	-	-	-	-	-	-	-	-	-		1
Israel	6th	6th	9th	11th	-	-	15th	9th	9th	9th	10th	7th	9th	11th	13th	13th	21st	10th	21st	17th	14th		31
Italy	5th	1st	3rd	5th	4th	2nd	9th	5th	2nd	1st	11th	3rd	9th	9th	-	17th	8th	6th	6th	7th	11th		39
Latvia	Part of Soviet Union					-	10th	-	16th	-	8th	13th	13th	13th	13th	21st	10th	8th	5th	-	12th		15
Lebanon	-	-	-	-	-	-	-	-	-	-	-	-	-	-	-	-	-	-	-	-	-		2
Lithuania	Part of Soviet Union					-	-	2nd	6th	5th	12th	1st	5th	3rd	11th	5th	2nd	2nd	9th	15th	5th		16
Luxembourg	-	-	-	-	-	-	-	-	-	-	-	-	-	-	-	-	-	-	-	-	-		3
Montenegro	Part of Yugoslavia						Part of Serbia and Montenegro							-	-	21st	17th	-	13th	13th	20th		5
Netherlands	-	4th	12th	10th	8th	-	-	-	-	-	-	-	-	-	-	-	-	21st	-	22nd	-		16
North Macedonia	Part of Yugoslavia						-	-	-	13th	-	-	-	-	9th	4th	21st	19th	-	-	-		5
Poland	7th	9th	11th	7th	-	7th	-	-	7th	-	-	-	-	13th	9th	17th	21st	11th	18th	4th	6th		30
Portugal	-	-	-	-	-	-	-	-	-	-	-	-	-	9th	-	21st	-	-	-	-	15th		4
Romania	-	-	10th	12th	-	-	-	-	-	-	-	-	-	-	-	-	-	-	23rd	-	-		18
Russia	Part of Soviet Union						2nd	7th	3rd	6th	5th	8th	8th	1st	7th	3rd	21st	17th	4th	DQ	DQ		13
Scotland	-	-	-	-	-	-	-	-	-	-	-	-	-	-	-	-	-	-	-	-	-	-	2
Serbia	Part of Yugoslavia						Part of Serbia and Montenegro							13th	2nd	8th	7th	4th	2nd	9th	10th		8
Serbia and Montenegro	Part of Yugoslavia						DQ	1st	1st	3rd	1st	6th	9th	X	X	X	X	X	X	X	X	X	2
Slovenia	Part of Yugoslavia						14th	12th	14th	10th	15th	10th	6th	7th	4th	7th	5th	12th	1st	6th	7th	Q	16
Soviet Union	1st	3rd	1st	2nd	3rd	-	X	X	X	X	X	X	X	X	X	X	X	X	X	X	X	X	21
Spain	4th	2nd	4th	4th	5th	3rd	5th	6th	5th	2nd	3rd	2nd	4th	2nd	1st	1st	3rd	1st	3rd	1st	17th	Q	34
Sweden	-	12th	-	-	-	-	13th	11th	-	-	-	16th	-	-	-	-	13th	-	-	-	16th		11
Switzerland	-	-	-	-	-	-	-	-	-	-	-	-	-	-	-	-	-	-	-	-	-		5
Syria	-	-	-	-	-	-	-	-	-	-	-	-	-	-	-	-	-	-	-	-	-	-	1
Turkey	11th	-	-	-	-	-	11th	13th	8th	8th	2nd	12th	9th	11th	8th	11th	17th	14th	14th	10th	2nd		26
Ukraine	Part of Soviet Union						-	-	13th	-	16th	14th	13th	-	-	17th	6th	22nd	15th	12th	-		9
Yugoslavia	2nd	7th	7th	3rd	1st	1st	X	X	X	X	X	X	X	X	X	X	X	X	X	X	X	X	25
Total	12	12	12	12	8	8	16	14	16	16	16	16	16	16	16	24	24	24	24	24	24	24	

Notes

- According to FIBA, Yugoslavia competed until 2001.

== Debut of teams ==
A total of 46 national teams have appeared in at least one FIBA EuroBasket in the history of the tournament through the 2025 competition. Each successive EuroBasket has had at least one team appearing for the first time. Countries competing in their first EuroBasket are listed below by year.

Year	Debutants	Number
1935	Belgium, Bulgaria, Czechoslovakia, France, Hungary, Italy, Latvia, Romania, Spain, Switzerland	10
1937	Egypt, Estonia, Lithuania, Poland	13
1939	Finland	14
1946	England, Luxembourg, Netherlands	17
1947	Albania, Austria, Soviet Union, Yugoslavia	21
1949	Greece, Lebanon, Syria, Turkey	25
1951	Denmark, Germany, Portugal, Scotland	29
1953	Israel, Sweden	31
1955	None	31
1957	None	31
1959	East Germany, Iran	33
1961	None	33
1963	None	33
1965	None	33
1967	None	33
1969	None	33
1971	None	33
1973	None	33
1975	None	33
1977	None	33
1979	None	33
1981	None	33
1983	None	33
1985	None	33
1987	None	33
1989	None	33
1991	None	33
1993	Bosnia and Herzegovina, Croatia, Russia, Slovenia	37
1995	None	37
1997	Ukraine	38
1999	Czech Republic, North Macedonia	40
2001	None	40
2003	None	40
2005	None	40
2007	Serbia	41
2009	Great Britain	42
2011	Georgia, Montenegro	44
2013	None	44
2015	Iceland	45
2017	None	45
2022	None	45
2025	Cyprus	46
2029	TBD	
Total		46

== Most successful players ==
Boldface denotes active basketball players and highest medal count among all players (including these who not included in these tables) per type.

=== Multiple gold medalists ===
Rank	Player	Country	From	To	Gold	Silver	Bronze	Total
1	Gennadi Volnov	Soviet Union	1959	1969	**6**	–	–	6
2	Sergei Belov	Soviet Union	1967	1979	4	2	1	**7**
3	Rudy Fernández	Spain	2007	2022	4	1	1	6
4	Predrag Danilović	Yugoslavia; FR Yugoslavia	1989	1999	4	–	1	5
4	Modestas Paulauskas	Soviet Union	1965	1973	4	–	1	5
4	Zurab Sakandelidze	Soviet Union	1965	1973	4	–	1	5
7	Armenak Alachachian	Soviet Union	1953	1965	4	–	–	4
7	Aleksandr Petrov	Soviet Union	1959	1965	4	–	–	4
9	Krešimir Ćosić	Yugoslavia	1969	1981	3	**3**	1	**7**
10	Pau Gasol	Spain	2001	2017	3	2	2	**7**

=== Multiple medalists ===
The table shows players who have won at least 6 medals in total at the EuroBasket.

Rank	Player	Country	From	To	Gold	Silver	Bronze	Total
1	Sergei Belov	Soviet Union	1967	1979	4	2	1	**7**
2	Krešimir Ćosić	Yugoslavia	1969	1981	3	**3**	1	**7**
3	Pau Gasol	Spain	2001	2017	3	2	2	**7**
4	Gennadi Volnov	Soviet Union	1959	1969	**6**	–	–	6
5	Rudy Fernández	Spain	2007	2022	4	1	1	6
6	Felipe Reyes	Spain	2001	2015	3	2	1	6
7	Alexander Belostenny	Soviet Union	1977	1989	3	1	2	6
8	Valdemaras Chomičius	Soviet Union; Lithuania	1979	1995	2	2	2	6
8	Juan Carlos Navarro	Spain	2001	2017	2	2	2	6

== Awards ==
Below are the lists of all players voted as the MVPs and the Top Scorers of each EuroBasket edition. Krešimir Ćosić and Pau Gasol are the only players to win the MVP award twice. Nikos Galis and Radivoj Korać were the Top Scorers 4 times each.

Bronze	Member of the FIBA Hall of Fame.
Silver	Member of the Naismith Memorial Basketball Hall of Fame.
Gold	Member of both the FIBA Hall of Fame and the Naismith Memorial Basketball Hall of Fame.
Player (X)	Denotes the number of times the player was selected the MVP or was the Top Scorer.

Tournament	MVP	Top Scorer	PPG
EuroBasket 1935	(Spain) Rafael Martín	(Italy) Livio Franceschini	16.5
EuroBasket 1937	(Lithuania) Pranas Talzūnas	(Latvia) Rūdolfs Jurciņš	12.5
EuroBasket 1939	(Lithuania) Mykolas Ruzgys (de facto: (Lithuania) Pranas Lubinas)^{‡}	(Estonia) Heino Veskila	16.7
EuroBasket 1946	(Hungary) Ferenc Németh	(Poland) Paweł Stok	12.6
EuroBasket 1947	(Soviet Union) Joann Lõssov	(France) Jacques Perrier	13.7
EuroBasket 1949	(Turkey) Hüseyin Öztürk	(Turkey) Hüseyin Öztürk	19.3
EuroBasket 1951	(Czechoslovakia) Ivan Mrázek	(Czechoslovakia) Ivan Mrázek	17.1
EuroBasket 1953	(Soviet Union) Anatoly Konev	(Lebanon) Ahmed Idlibi	15.9
EuroBasket 1955	(Hungary) János Greminger	(Czechoslovakia) Miroslav Škeřík	19.1
EuroBasket 1957	(Czechoslovakia) Jiří Baumruk	(Belgium) Eddy Terrace	24.4
EuroBasket 1959	(Soviet Union) Viktor Zubkov	(Socialist Federal Republic of Yugoslavia) Radivoj Korać	28.1
EuroBasket 1961	(Socialist Federal Republic of Yugoslavia) Radivoj Korać	(Socialist Federal Republic of Yugoslavia) Radivoj Korać (2)	24.0
EuroBasket 1963	(Spain) Emiliano Rodríguez	(Socialist Federal Republic of Yugoslavia) Radivoj Korać (3)	26.6
EuroBasket 1965	(Soviet Union) Modestas Paulauskas	(Socialist Federal Republic of Yugoslavia) Radivoj Korać (4)	21.9
EuroBasket 1967	(Czechoslovakia) Jiří Zedníček	(Greece) Giorgos Kolokithas	26.7
EuroBasket 1969	(Soviet Union) Sergei Belov	(Greece) Giorgos Kolokithas (2)	23.5
EuroBasket 1971	(Socialist Federal Republic of Yugoslavia) Krešimir Ćosić	(Poland) Edward Jurkiewicz	22.6
EuroBasket 1973	(Spain) Wayne Brabender	(Bulgaria) Atanas Golomeev	22.3
EuroBasket 1975	(Socialist Federal Republic of Yugoslavia) Krešimir Ćosić (2)	(Bulgaria) Atanas Golomeev (2)	22.9
EuroBasket 1977	(Socialist Federal Republic of Yugoslavia) Dražen Dalipagić	(Netherlands) Kees Akerboom	27.0
EuroBasket 1979	(Israel) Miki Berkovich	(Poland) Mieczysław Młynarski	26.6
EuroBasket 1981	(Soviet Union) Valdis Valters	(Poland) Mieczysław Młynarski (2)	23.1
EuroBasket 1983	(Spain) Juan Antonio Corbalán	(Greece) Nikos Galis	33.0
EuroBasket 1985	(Soviet Union) Arvydas Sabonis	(Israel) Doron Jamchi	28.1
EuroBasket 1987	(Greece) Nikos Galis	(Greece) Nikos Galis (2)	37.0
EuroBasket 1989	(Socialist Federal Republic of Yugoslavia) Dražen Petrović	(Greece) Nikos Galis (3)	35.6
EuroBasket 1991	(Socialist Federal Republic of Yugoslavia) Toni Kukoč	(Greece) Nikos Galis (4)	32.4
EuroBasket 1993	(Germany) Chris Welp	(Bosnia and Herzegovina) Sabahudin Bilalović	24.1
EuroBasket 1995	(Lithuania) Šarūnas Marčiulionis	(Lithuania) Šarūnas Marčiulionis	22.5
EuroBasket 1997	(Federal Republic of Yugoslavia) Saša Đorđević	(Israel) Oded Kattash	22.0
EuroBasket 1999	(Italy) Gregor Fučka	(Spain) Alberto Herreros	19.2
EuroBasket 2001	(Federal Republic of Yugoslavia) Peja Stojaković	(Germany) Dirk Nowitzki	28.7
EuroBasket 2003	(Lithuania) Šarūnas Jasikevičius	(Spain) Pau Gasol	25.8
EuroBasket 2005	(Germany) Dirk Nowitzki	(Germany) Dirk Nowitzki (2)	26.1
EuroBasket 2007	(Russia) Andrei Kirilenko	(Germany) Dirk Nowitzki (3)	24.0
EuroBasket 2009	(Spain) Pau Gasol	(Spain) Pau Gasol (2)	18.7
EuroBasket 2011	(Spain) Juan Carlos Navarro	(France) Tony Parker	22.1
EuroBasket 2013	(France) Tony Parker	(France) Tony Parker (2)	19.0
EuroBasket 2015	(Spain) Pau Gasol (2)	(Spain) Pau Gasol (3)	25.6
EuroBasket 2017	(Slovenia) Goran Dragić	(Russia) Alexey Shved	24.3
EuroBasket 2022	(Spain) Willy Hernangómez	(Greece) Giannis Antetokounmpo	29.3
EuroBasket 2025	(Germany) Dennis Schröder	(Slovenia) Luka Dončić	34.7

=== MVP and Top scorer by country ===
Country	Times MVP	Years	Country	Times Top Scorer	Years
Spain	8	1935, 1963, 1973, 1983, 2009, 2011, 2015, 2022	Greece	7	1967, 1969, 1983, 1987, 1989, 1991, 2022
Soviet Union	7	1947, 1953, 1959, 1965, 1969, 1981, 1985	Spain	4	1999, 2003, 2009, 2015
Yugoslavia	6	1961, 1971, 1975, 1977, 1989, 1991	Poland	4	1946, 1971, 1979, 1981
Lithuania	4	1937, 1939, 1995, 2003	Yugoslavia	4	1959, 1961, 1963, 1965
Czechoslovakia	3	1951, 1957, 1967	France	3	1947, 2011, 2013
Germany	3	1993, 2005, 2025	Germany	3	2001, 2005, 2007
FR Yugoslavia	2	1997, 2001	Czechoslovakia	2	1951, 1955
Hungary	2	1946, 1955	Bulgaria	2	1973, 1975
Turkey	1	1949	Israel	2	1985, 1997
Israel	1	1979	Italy	1	1935
Greece	1	1987	Latvia	1	1937
Italy	1	1999	Estonia	1	1939
Russia	1	2007	Turkey	1	1949
France	1	2013	Lebanon	1	1953
Slovenia	1	2017	Belgium	1	1957
			Netherlands	1	1977
			Bosnia and Herzegovina	1	1993
			Lithuania	1	1995
			Russia	1	2017
			Slovenia	1	2025

=== Most times MVP and Top scorer by players ===
Player	Times MVP	Years	Player	Times Top Scorer	Years
(Socialist Federal Republic of Yugoslavia) Krešimir Ćosić	2	1971, 1975	(Greece) Nikos Galis	4	1983, 1987, 1989, 1991
(Spain) Pau Gasol	2	2009, 2015	(Socialist Federal Republic of Yugoslavia) Radivoj Korać	4	1959, 1961, 1963, 1965
One time MVP, earned by 36 players			(Germany) Dirk Nowitzki	3	2001, 2005, 2007
One time MVP, earned by 36 players			(Spain) Pau Gasol	3	2003, 2009, 2015
One time MVP, earned by 36 players			(Greece) Giorgos Kolokithas	2	1967, 1969
One time MVP, earned by 36 players			(Bulgaria) Atanas Golomeev	2	1973, 1975
One time MVP, earned by 36 players			(Poland) Mieczysław Młynarski	2	1979, 1981
One time MVP, earned by 36 players			(France) Tony Parker	2	2011, 2013

== Player scoring records ==
=== Most career points scored ===
- Counting all games played through the end of EuroBasket 2022, and not counting qualification games.

List of all-time scorers (overall)
Player	Points scored	Games played	Scoring average
(Spain) Pau Gasol	1,183	58	20.4
(France) Tony Parker	1,104	66	16.7
(Germany) Dirk Nowitzki	1,052	49	21.4
(Greece) Nikos Galis	1,031	33	31.2
(Czechoslovakia) Kamil Brabenec	918	60	15.3
(Israel) Miki Berkovich	917	49	18.7
(Spain) Juan Antonio San Epifanio	894	52	17.2
(Spain) Emiliano Rodríguez	864	53	16.3
(Socialist Federal Republic of Yugoslavia) Radivoj Korać	844	34	24.8
(Greece) Panagiotis Giannakis	769	58	13.3

=== Highest career points per game average ===
- Counting all games played through the end of EuroBasket 2022, and not counting qualification games.

List of all-time top 10 scorers (by average)
Player	Points scored	Games played	Scoring average
(Greece) Nikos Galis	1,031	33	31.2
(Socialist Federal Republic of Yugoslavia) Radivoj Korać	844	34	24.8
(United Kingdom) Luol Deng	123	5	24.6
(Belgium) Eddy Terrace	220	9	24.4
(Bosnia and Herzegovina) Sabahudin Bilalović	217	9	24.1
(Socialist Federal Republic of Yugoslavia) Dražen Petrović	604	26	23.2
(Germany) Dennis Schröder	448	20	22.4
(Netherlands) Rik Smits	154	7	22.0
(Poland) Mieczysław Młynarski	482	22	21.9
(Germany) Michael Jackel	347	16	21.6

=== FIBA EuroBasket 2000–2020 Dream Team ===
Position	FIBA EuroBasket Dream Team	Years
PG	(Lithuania) Šarūnas Jasikevičius	2000–2020
SG	(Greece) Vassilis Spanoulis	2000–2020
SF	(Greece) Dimitris Diamantidis	2000–2020
PF	(Germany) Dirk Nowitzki	2000–2020
C	(Spain) Pau Gasol	2000–2020

== See also ==
- Basketball at the Summer Olympic Games
- FIBA EuroBasket Records
- FIBA EuroBasket MVP
- FIBA EuroBasket Top Scorer
- FIBA EuroBasket All-Tournament Team
- FIBA World Cup
- FIBA World Cup Records
- FIBA's 50 Greatest Players (1991)
- FIBA EuroBasket Division B (defunct)
- FIBA European Championship for Small Countries
- FIBA EuroBasket Women
- List of FIBA EuroBasket winning head coaches
- European Wheelchair Basketball Championship
