= FIBA EuroBasket Top Scorer =

Basketball award

The FIBA EuroBasket Top Scorer is the FIBA Europe honor that is bestowed upon the leading scorer of each FIBA EuroBasket tournament. Radivoj Korać and Nikos Galis hold the scoring king record, finishing as the EuroBasket's top scorer on four occasions.

== Key ==
†	Inducted into the FIBA Hall of Fame
*	Inducted into the FIBA Hall of Fame and the Naismith Memorial Basketball Hall of Fame
Player (X)	Denotes the number of times the player had been Top Scorer at that time

== Top scorers ==
=== Average ===
Tournament	Top Scorer	PPG
1935	(Italy) Livio Franceschini	16.5
1937	(Latvia) Rūdolfs Jurciņš	12.5
1939	(Estonia) Heino Veskila	16.7
1946	(Poland) Paweł Stok	12.6
1947	(France) Jacques Perrier	12.7
1949	(Turkey) Hüseyin Öztürk	19.3
1951	(Czechoslovakia) Ivan Mrázek	17.1
1953	(Lebanon) Ahmed Idlibi	15.9
1955	(Czechoslovakia) Miroslav Škeřík	19.1
1957	(Belgium) Eddy Terrace	24.4
1959	(Socialist Federal Republic of Yugoslavia) Radivoj Korać*	28.1
1961	(Socialist Federal Republic of Yugoslavia) Radivoj Korać* (2)	24.0
1963	(Socialist Federal Republic of Yugoslavia) Radivoj Korać* (3)	26.6
1965	(Socialist Federal Republic of Yugoslavia) Radivoj Korać* (4)	21.9
1967	(Greece) Giorgos Kolokithas	26.7
1969	(Greece) Giorgos Kolokithas (2)	23.5
1971	(Poland) Edward Jurkiewicz	22.6
1973	(Bulgaria) Atanas Golomeev†	22.3
1975	(Bulgaria) Atanas Golomeev† (2)	23.1
1977	(Netherlands) Kees Akerboom	26.4
1979	(Poland) Mieczysław Młynarski	27.1
1981	(Poland) Mieczysław Młynarski (2)	22.9
1983	(Greece) Nikos Galis*	33.6
1985	(Israel) Doron Jamchi	28.1
1987	(Greece) Nikos Galis* (2)	37.0
1989	(Greece) Nikos Galis* (3)	35.6
1991	(Greece) Nikos Galis* (4)	32.4
1993	(Bosnia and Herzegovina) Sabahudin Bilalović	24.1
1995	(Lithuania) Šarūnas Marčiulionis*	22.5
1997	(Israel) Oded Kattash	22.0
1999	(Spain) Alberto Herreros	19.2
2001	(Germany) Dirk Nowitzki	28.7
2003	(Spain) Pau Gasol	25.8
2005	(Germany) Dirk Nowitzki (2)	26.1
2007	(Germany) Dirk Nowitzki (3)	24.0
2009	(Spain) Pau Gasol (2)	18.7
2011	(France) Tony Parker	22.1
2013	(France) Tony Parker (2)	19.0
2015	(Spain) Pau Gasol (3)	25.6
2017	(Russia) Alexey Shved	24.3
2022	(Greece) Giannis Antetokounmpo	29.3
2025	(Slovenia) Luka Dončić	34.7

=== Total points (1935–2025) ===
Tournament	Top Scorer	Points	Games
1935	(Italy) Livio Franceschini	66	4
1937	(Latvia) Rūdolfs Jurciņš	50	4
1939	(Estonia) Heino Veskila	100	6
1946	(Poland) Pawel Stok	62	5
1947	(Czechoslovakia) Ivan Mrázek	97	7
1949	(Turkey) Hüseyin Öztürk	116	6
1951	(Czechoslovakia) Ivan Mrázek (2)	137	8
1953	(Lebanon) Ahmed Idlibi	143	9
1955	(Czechoslovakia) Miroslav Škeřík	191	10
1957	(Belgium) Eddy Terrace	220	9
1959	(Socialist Federal Republic of Yugoslavia) Radivoj Korać*	193	7
1961	(Socialist Federal Republic of Yugoslavia) Radivoj Korać* (2)	216	9
1963	(Socialist Federal Republic of Yugoslavia) Radivoj Korać* (3)	238	9
1965	(Socialist Federal Republic of Yugoslavia) Radivoj Korać* (4)	197	9
1967	(Greece) Giorgos Kolokithas	229	9
1969	(Greece) Giorgos Kolokithas (2)	161	7
1971	(Poland) Edward Jurkiewicz	154	7
1973	(Bulgaria) Atanas Golomeev	156	7
1975	(Bulgaria) Atanas Golomeev (2)	162	7
1977	(Netherlands) Kees Akerboom	185	7
1979	(Poland) Mieczysław Młynarski	190	7
1981	(Poland) Mieczysław Młynarski (2)	183	8
1983	(Greece) Nikos Galis*	235	7
1985	(Socialist Federal Republic of Yugoslavia) Dražen Petrović	201	8
1987	(Greece) Nikos Galis* (2)	296	8
1989	(Greece) Nikos Galis* (3)	178	5
1991	(Greece) Nikos Galis* (4)	163	5
1993	(Bosnia and Herzegovina) Sabahudin Bilalović	217	9
1995	(France) Yann Bonato	195	9
1997	(Lithuania) Artūras Karnišovas	186	9
1999	(Spain) Alberto Herreros	173	9
2001	(Germany) Dirk Nowitzki	201	7
2003	(Spain) Pau Gasol	155	6
2005	(Germany) Dirk Nowitzki (2)	183	7
2007	(Germany) Dirk Nowitzki (3)	216	9
2009	(Spain) Pau Gasol (2)	168	9
2011	(United States) (North Macedonia) Bo McCalebb	235	11
2013	(France) Tony Parker (2)	209	11
2015	(Spain) Pau Gasol (3)	230	9
2017	(Russia) Alexey Shved	219	9
2022	(Finland) Lauri Markkanen	195	7
2025	(Slovenia) Luka Dončić	243	7

== Most frequent top scorers ==
Number	Player
4	(Greece) Nikos Galis
4	(Socialist Federal Republic of Yugoslavia) Radivoj Korać
3	(Spain) Pau Gasol
3	(Germany) Dirk Nowitzki
2	(France) Tony Parker
2	(Bulgaria) Atanas Golomeev
2	(Greece) Giorgos Kolokithas
2	(Poland) Mieczysław Młynarski

All information as of end EuroBasket 2025.

== Grand Final Topscorer ==
Tournament	Top Scorer	Points
1935	(Latvia) Rūdolfs Jurciņš	11
1937	(Lithuania) Pranas Talžūnas (Italy) Livio Franceschini	12
1939	(Latvia) Kārlis Ārents	13
1946	(Czechoslovakia) Josef Krepela	15
1947	(Soviet Union) Otar Korkia	23
1949	(Egypt) Hussein Montasser	10
1951	(Soviet Union) Stepas Butautas	17
1953	(Soviet Union) Stepas Butautas (2)	13
1955	(Hungary) László Hódi	20
1957	(Soviet Union) Viktor Zubkov	17
1959	(Soviet Union) Jānis Krūmiņš	32
1961	(Soviet Union) Jānis Krūmiņš (Socialist Federal Republic of Yugoslavia) Nemanja Ðurić	16
1963	(Soviet Union) Jānis Krūmiņš (3) (Socialist Federal Republic of Yugoslavia) Ivo Daneu	18
1965	(Soviet Union) Modestas Paulauskas (Socialist Federal Republic of Yugoslavia) Nemanja Ðurić	16
1967	(Soviet Union) Gennadi Volnov	23
1969	(Soviet Union) Modestas Paulauskas (2) (Soviet Union) Vladimir Andreev	20
1971	(Soviet Union) Alzhan Zharmukhamedov (Socialist Federal Republic of Yugoslavia) Žarko Knežević	16
1973	(Socialist Federal Republic of Yugoslavia) Krešimir Ćosić	23
1975	(Soviet Union) Sergei Belov	29
1977	(Socialist Federal Republic of Yugoslavia) Dražen Dalipagić	27
1979	(Soviet Union) Vladimir Tkachenko	29
1981	(Soviet Union) Anatoly Myshkin	29
1983	(Spain) Juan Antonio San Epifanio	21
1985	(Soviet Union) Valdis Valters	27
1987	(Greece) Nikos Galis*	40
1989	(Greece) Nikos Galis* (2)	30
1991	(Socialist Federal Republic of Yugoslavia) Dino Rađa	23
1993	(Russia) Sergei Babkov	18
1995	(Socialist Federal Republic of Yugoslavia) Aleksandar Đorđević	41
1997	(Italy) Carlton Myers	18
1999	(Italy) Carlton Myers (2)	18
2001	(Serbia) Vlado Šćepanović	19
2003	(Spain) Pau Gasol	36
2005	(Germany) Dirk Nowitzki	23
2007	(Russia) Andrei Kirilenko	17
2009	(Spain) Pau Gasol	18
2011	(Spain) Juan Carlos Navarro	27
2013	(Lithuania) Linas Kleiza	20
2015	(Spain) Pau Gasol (3)	25
2017	(Slovenia) Goran Dragić	35
2022	(Spain) Juancho Hernangómez	27
2025	(Turkey) Alperen Şengün	28

== See also ==
- FIBA EuroBasket
- FIBA EuroBasket MVP
- FIBA EuroBasket All-Tournament Team
- FIBA EuroBasket All-Time leaders in games played
- FIBA EuroBasket All-time leading scorers in total points scored
- FIBA World Cup
- FIBA World Cup Records
- FIBA Basketball World Cup Most Valuable Player
- FIBA Basketball World Cup All-Tournament Team
- FIBA's 50 Greatest Players (1991)

== Sources ==
- European Championship
