= FIBA EuroBasket All-Tournament Team =

FIBA Europe Award

The FIBA EuroBasket All-Tournament Team, or FIBA EuroBasket All-Star Five, is the FIBA Europe award that is bestowed upon the five best players of each FIBA EuroBasket tournament. Pau Gasol holds the record for the most selections in the All-EuroBasket Team, with a total of seven.

== FIBA EuroBasket All-Tournament Teams ==
Bronze	Member of the FIBA Hall of Fame.
Silver	Member of the Naismith Memorial Basketball Hall of Fame.
Gold	Member of both the FIBA Hall of Fame and the Naismith Memorial Basketball Hall of Fame.
Player (X)	Denotes the number of times the player was selected to the All-Tournament Team.

=== 1937 EuroBasket ===
Tournament	All-Tournament Team	National Team
EuroBasket 1937	(Lithuania) Pranas Talzūnas	Lithuania
EuroBasket 1937	?	?
EuroBasket 1937	(Estonia) Heino Veskila	Estonia
EuroBasket 1937	?	?
EuroBasket 1937	(Lithuania) Feliksas Kriaučiūnas	Lithuania

=== 1939 EuroBasket ===
Tournament	All-Tournament Team	National Team
EuroBasket 1939	?	?
EuroBasket 1939	(Lithuania) Feliksas Kriaučiūnas (2)	Lithuania
EuroBasket 1939	(Lithuania) Mykolas Ruzgys	Lithuania
EuroBasket 1939	(Lithuania) Vytautas Budriūnas	Lithuania
EuroBasket 1939	? (de facto: (Lithuania) Pranas Lubinas)^{‡}	Lithuania

=== 1967 EuroBasket ===
Tournament	All-Tournament Team	National Team
EuroBasket 1967	(Soviet Union) Sergei Belov	Soviet Union
EuroBasket 1967	(Soviet Union) Modestas Paulauskas	Soviet Union
EuroBasket 1967	(Czechoslovakia) Jiří Zedníček	Czechoslovakia
EuroBasket 1967	(Czechoslovakia) Jiří Zídek	Czechoslovakia
EuroBasket 1967	(Finland) Veikko Vainio	Finland

=== 1969 EuroBasket ===
Tournament	All-Tournament Team	National Team
EuroBasket 1969	(Soviet Union) Sergei Belov (2)	Soviet Union
EuroBasket 1969	(Socialist Federal Republic of Yugoslavia) Ivo Daneu	(Socialist Federal Republic of Yugoslavia) Yugoslavia
EuroBasket 1969	(Poland) Edward Jurkiewicz	Poland
EuroBasket 1969	(Spain) Clifford Luyk	Spain
EuroBasket 1969	(Socialist Federal Republic of Yugoslavia) Krešimir Ćosić	(Socialist Federal Republic of Yugoslavia) Yugoslavia

=== 1971 EuroBasket ===
Tournament	All-Tournament Team	National Team
EuroBasket 1971	(Soviet Union) Sergei Belov (3)	Soviet Union
EuroBasket 1971	(Soviet Union) Modestas Paulauskas (2)	Soviet Union
EuroBasket 1971	(Poland) Edward Jurkiewicz (2)	Poland
EuroBasket 1971	(Socialist Federal Republic of Yugoslavia) Krešimir Ćosić (2)	(Socialist Federal Republic of Yugoslavia) Yugoslavia
EuroBasket 1971	(Bulgaria) Atanas Golomeev	Bulgaria

=== 1973 EuroBasket ===
Tournament	All-Tournament Team	National Team
EuroBasket 1973	(Soviet Union) Sergei Belov (4)	Soviet Union
EuroBasket 1973	(Spain) Nino Buscató	Spain
EuroBasket 1973	(Spain) Wayne Brabender	Spain
EuroBasket 1973	(Socialist Federal Republic of Yugoslavia) Krešimir Ćosić (3)	(Socialist Federal Republic of Yugoslavia) Yugoslavia
EuroBasket 1973	(Bulgaria) Atanas Golomeev (2)	Bulgaria

=== 1975 EuroBasket ===
Tournament	All-Tournament Team	National Team
EuroBasket 1975	(Soviet Union) Sergei Belov (5)	Soviet Union
EuroBasket 1975	(Socialist Federal Republic of Yugoslavia) Dražen Dalipagić	(Socialist Federal Republic of Yugoslavia) Yugoslavia
EuroBasket 1975	(Spain) Wayne Brabender (2)	Spain
EuroBasket 1975	(Socialist Federal Republic of Yugoslavia) Krešimir Ćosić (4)	(Socialist Federal Republic of Yugoslavia) Yugoslavia
EuroBasket 1975	(Bulgaria) Atanas Golomeev (3)	Bulgaria

=== 1977 EuroBasket ===
Tournament	All-Tournament Team	National Team
EuroBasket 1977	(Socialist Federal Republic of Yugoslavia) Zoran Slavnić	(Socialist Federal Republic of Yugoslavia) Yugoslavia
EuroBasket 1977	(Israel) Miki Berkovich	Israel
EuroBasket 1977	(Socialist Federal Republic of Yugoslavia) Dražen Dalipagić (2)	(Socialist Federal Republic of Yugoslavia) Yugoslavia
EuroBasket 1977	(Netherlands) Kees Akerboom	Netherlands
EuroBasket 1977	(Bulgaria) Atanas Golomeev (4)	Bulgaria

=== 1979 EuroBasket ===
Tournament	All-Tournament Team	National Team
EuroBasket 1979	(Soviet Union) Sergei Belov (6)	Soviet Union
EuroBasket 1979	(Socialist Federal Republic of Yugoslavia) Dragan Kićanović	(Socialist Federal Republic of Yugoslavia) Yugoslavia
EuroBasket 1979	(Israel) Miki Berkovich (2)	Israel
EuroBasket 1979	(Socialist Federal Republic of Yugoslavia) Krešimir Ćosić (5)	(Socialist Federal Republic of Yugoslavia) Yugoslavia
EuroBasket 1979	(Soviet Union) Vladimir Tkachenko	Soviet Union

=== 1981 EuroBasket ===
Tournament	All-Tournament Team	National Team
EuroBasket 1981	(Soviet Union) Valdis Valters	Soviet Union
EuroBasket 1981	(Socialist Federal Republic of Yugoslavia) Dragan Kićanović (2)	(Socialist Federal Republic of Yugoslavia) Yugoslavia
EuroBasket 1981	(Socialist Federal Republic of Yugoslavia) Dražen Dalipagić (3)	(Socialist Federal Republic of Yugoslavia) Yugoslavia
EuroBasket 1981	(Soviet Union) Anatoly Myshkin	Soviet Union
EuroBasket 1981	(Soviet Union) Vladimir Tkachenko (2)	Soviet Union

=== 1983 EuroBasket ===
Tournament	All-Tournament Team	National Team
EuroBasket 1983	(Spain) Juan Antonio Corbalán	Spain
EuroBasket 1983	(Greece) Nikos Galis	Greece
EuroBasket 1983	(Spain) Juan Antonio San Epifanio	Spain
EuroBasket 1983	(Czechoslovakia) Stanislav Kropilák	Czechoslovakia
EuroBasket 1983	(Soviet Union) Arvydas Sabonis	Soviet Union

=== 1985 EuroBasket ===
Tournament	All-Tournament Team	National Team
EuroBasket 1985	(Soviet Union) Valdis Valters (2)	Soviet Union
EuroBasket 1985	(Socialist Federal Republic of Yugoslavia) Dražen Petrović	(Socialist Federal Republic of Yugoslavia) Yugoslavia
EuroBasket 1985	(West Germany) Detlef Schrempf	West Germany
EuroBasket 1985	(Spain) Fernando Martín	Spain
EuroBasket 1985	(Soviet Union) Arvydas Sabonis (2)	Soviet Union

=== 1987 EuroBasket ===
Tournament	All-Tournament Team	National Team
EuroBasket 1987	(Soviet Union) Šarūnas Marčiulionis	Soviet Union
EuroBasket 1987	(Greece) Nikos Galis (2)	Greece
EuroBasket 1987	(Soviet Union) Alexander Volkov	Soviet Union
EuroBasket 1987	(Spain) Andrés Jiménez	Spain
EuroBasket 1987	(Greece) Panagiotis Fasoulas	Greece

=== 1989 EuroBasket ===
Tournament	All-Tournament Team	National Team
EuroBasket 1989	(Greece) Nikos Galis (3)	Greece
EuroBasket 1989	(Socialist Federal Republic of Yugoslavia) Dražen Petrović (2)	(Socialist Federal Republic of Yugoslavia) Yugoslavia
EuroBasket 1989	(Socialist Federal Republic of Yugoslavia) Žarko Paspalj	(Socialist Federal Republic of Yugoslavia) Yugoslavia
EuroBasket 1989	(France) Stéphane Ostrowski	France
EuroBasket 1989	(Socialist Federal Republic of Yugoslavia) Dino Rađa	(Socialist Federal Republic of Yugoslavia) Yugoslavia

=== 1991 EuroBasket ===
Tournament	All-Tournament Team	National Team
EuroBasket 1991	(Italy) Nando Gentile	Italy
EuroBasket 1991	(Greece) Nikos Galis (4)	Greece
EuroBasket 1991	(Socialist Federal Republic of Yugoslavia) Toni Kukoč	(Socialist Federal Republic of Yugoslavia) Yugoslavia
EuroBasket 1991	(Spain) Antonio Martín	Spain
EuroBasket 1991	(Socialist Federal Republic of Yugoslavia) Vlade Divac	(Socialist Federal Republic of Yugoslavia) Yugoslavia

=== 1993 EuroBasket ===
Tournament	All-Tournament Team	National Team
EuroBasket 1993	(Russia) Sergei Bazarevich	Russia
EuroBasket 1993	(Spain) Jordi Villacampa	Spain
EuroBasket 1993	(Greece) Fanis Christodoulou	Greece
EuroBasket 1993	(Germany) Chris Welp	Germany
EuroBasket 1993	(Croatia) Dino Rađa (2)	Croatia

=== 1995 EuroBasket ===
Tournament	All-Tournament Team	National Team
EuroBasket 1995	(Lithuania) Šarūnas Marčiulionis (2)	Lithuania
EuroBasket 1995	(Croatia) Toni Kukoč (2)	Croatia
EuroBasket 1995	(Greece) Fanis Christodoulou (2)	Greece
EuroBasket 1995	(Federal Republic of Yugoslavia) Vlade Divac (2)	(Federal Republic of Yugoslavia) FR Yugoslavia
EuroBasket 1995	(Lithuania) Arvydas Sabonis (3)	Lithuania

=== 1997 EuroBasket ===
Tournament	All-Tournament Team	National Team
EuroBasket 1997	(Federal Republic of Yugoslavia) Aleksandar Đorđević	(Federal Republic of Yugoslavia) FR Yugoslavia
EuroBasket 1997	(Poland) Dominik Tomczyk	Poland
EuroBasket 1997	(Federal Republic of Yugoslavia) Dejan Bodiroga	(Federal Republic of Yugoslavia) FR Yugoslavia
EuroBasket 1997	(Federal Republic of Yugoslavia) Željko Rebrača	(Federal Republic of Yugoslavia) FR Yugoslavia
EuroBasket 1997	(Russia) Mikhail Mikhaylov	Russia

=== 1999 EuroBasket ===
Tournament	All-Tournament Team	National Team
EuroBasket 1999	(Italy) Carlton Myers	Italy
EuroBasket 1999	(Italy) Andrea Meneghin	Italy
EuroBasket 1999	(Spain) Alberto Herreros	Spain
EuroBasket 1999	(Federal Republic of Yugoslavia) Dejan Bodiroga (2)	(Federal Republic of Yugoslavia) FR Yugoslavia
EuroBasket 1999	(Italy) Gregor Fučka	Italy

=== 2001 EuroBasket ===
Tournament	All-Tournament Team	National Team
EuroBasket 2001	(Croatia) Damir Mulaomerović	Croatia
EuroBasket 2001	(Federal Republic of Yugoslavia) Peja Stojaković	(Federal Republic of Yugoslavia) FR Yugoslavia
EuroBasket 2001	(Turkey) Hedo Türkoğlu	Turkey
EuroBasket 2001	(Germany) Dirk Nowitzki	Germany
EuroBasket 2001	(Spain) Pau Gasol	Spain

=== 2003 EuroBasket ===
Tournament	All-Tournament Team	National Team
EuroBasket 2003	(France) Tony Parker	France
EuroBasket 2003	(Lithuania) Šarūnas Jasikevičius	Lithuania
EuroBasket 2003	(Lithuania) Saulius Štombergas	Lithuania
EuroBasket 2003	(Russia) Andrei Kirilenko	Russia
EuroBasket 2003	(Spain) Pau Gasol (2)	Spain

=== 2005 EuroBasket ===
Tournament	All-Tournament Team	National Team
EuroBasket 2005	(Greece) Theo Papaloukas	Greece
EuroBasket 2005	(Spain) Juan Carlos Navarro	Spain
EuroBasket 2005	(Greece) Dimitris Diamantidis	Greece
EuroBasket 2005	(Germany) Dirk Nowitzki (2)	Germany
EuroBasket 2005	(France) Boris Diaw	France

=== 2007 EuroBasket ===
Tournament	All-Tournament Team	National Team
EuroBasket 2007	(Spain) José Calderón	Spain
EuroBasket 2007	(Lithuania) Ramūnas Šiškauskas	Lithuania
EuroBasket 2007	(Russia) Andrei Kirilenko (2)	Russia
EuroBasket 2007	(Germany) Dirk Nowitzki (3)	Germany
EuroBasket 2007	(Spain) Pau Gasol (3)	Spain

=== 2009 EuroBasket ===
Tournament	All-Tournament Team	National Team
EuroBasket 2009	(Greece) Vassilis Spanoulis	Greece
EuroBasket 2009	(Serbia) Miloš Teodosić	Serbia
EuroBasket 2009	(Spain) Rudy Fernández	Spain
EuroBasket 2009	(Slovenia) Erazem Lorbek	Slovenia
EuroBasket 2009	(Spain) Pau Gasol (4)	Spain

=== 2011 EuroBasket ===
Tournament	All-Tournament Team	National Team
EuroBasket 2011	(France) Tony Parker (2)	France
EuroBasket 2011	(North Macedonia) Bo McCalebb	(North Macedonia) Macedonia
EuroBasket 2011	(Spain) Juan Carlos Navarro (2)	Spain
EuroBasket 2011	(Russia) Andrei Kirilenko (3)	Russia
EuroBasket 2011	(Spain) Pau Gasol (5)	Spain

=== 2013 EuroBasket ===
Tournament	All-Tournament Team	National Team
EuroBasket 2013	(France) Tony Parker (3)	France
EuroBasket 2013	(Slovenia) Goran Dragić	Slovenia
EuroBasket 2013	(Croatia) Bojan Bogdanović	Croatia
EuroBasket 2013	(Lithuania) Linas Kleiza	Lithuania
EuroBasket 2013	(Spain) Marc Gasol	Spain

=== 2015 EuroBasket ===
Tournament	All-Tournament Team	National Team
EuroBasket 2015	(Spain) Sergio Rodríguez	Spain
EuroBasket 2015	(France) Nando de Colo	France
EuroBasket 2015	(Lithuania) Jonas Mačiulis	Lithuania
EuroBasket 2015	(Spain) Pau Gasol (6)	Spain
EuroBasket 2015	(Lithuania) Jonas Valančiūnas	Lithuania

=== 2017 EuroBasket ===
Tournament	All-Tournament Team	National Team
EuroBasket 2017	(Slovenia) Goran Dragić (2)	Slovenia
EuroBasket 2017	(Russia) Alexey Shved	Russia
EuroBasket 2017	(Serbia) Bogdan Bogdanović	Serbia
EuroBasket 2017	(Slovenia) Luka Dončić	Slovenia
EuroBasket 2017	(Spain) Pau Gasol (7)	Spain

=== 2022 EuroBasket ===
Tournament	All-Tournament Team	National Team
EuroBasket 2022	(Spain) Willy Hernangómez	Spain
EuroBasket 2022	(France) Rudy Gobert	France
EuroBasket 2022	(Germany) Dennis Schröder	Germany
EuroBasket 2022	(Greece) Giannis Antetokounmpo	Greece
EuroBasket 2022	(Spain) Lorenzo Brown	Spain

=== 2025 EuroBasket ===
Tournament	All-Tournament Team	National Team
EuroBasket 2025	(Turkey) Alperen Şengün	Turkey
EuroBasket 2025	(Greece) Giannis Antetokounmpo (2)	Greece
EuroBasket 2025	(Germany) Dennis Schröder (2)	Germany
EuroBasket 2025	(Germany) Franz Wagner	Germany
EuroBasket 2025	(Slovenia) Luka Dončić (2)	Slovenia

Tournament	All-Tournament Second Team	National Team
EuroBasket 2025	(Turkey) Cedi Osman	Turkey
EuroBasket 2025	(Finland) Lauri Markkanen	Finland
EuroBasket 2025	(Poland) Jordan Loyd	Poland
EuroBasket 2025	(Israel) Deni Avdija	Israel
EuroBasket 2025	(Serbia) Nikola Jokić	Serbia

=== Most appearances ===
Number	Player	MVP	Top Scorer
7	(Spain) Pau Gasol	2	3
6	(Soviet Union) Sergei Belov	1	—
5	(Socialist Federal Republic of Yugoslavia) Krešimir Ćosić	2	—
4	(Greece) Nikos Galis	1	4
4	(Bulgaria) Atanas Golomeev	—	2
3	(Germany) Dirk Nowitzki	1	3
3	(France) Tony Parker	1	2
3	(Russia) Andrei Kirilenko	1	—
3	(Soviet Union) / (Lithuania) Arvydas Sabonis	1	—
3	(Socialist Federal Republic of Yugoslavia) Dražen Dalipagić	1	—

== FIBA EuroBasket 2000–2020 Dream Team ==
The 2000–2020 FIBA EuroBasket Dream Team consisted of the 5 best players by position, of the top tier level FIBA EuroBasket competition, for the years 2000 to 2020.

*	Inducted into the Naismith Memorial Basketball Hall of Fame
**	Inducted into the FIBA Hall of Fame
***	Inducted into both the Naismith and FIBA Halls of Fame

Position	2000–2020 FIBA EuroBasket Dream Team
PG	(Lithuania) Šarūnas Jasikevičius
SG	(Greece) Vassilis Spanoulis
SF	(Greece) Dimitris Diamantidis
PF	(Germany) Dirk Nowitzki*
C	(Spain) Pau Gasol*

== FIBA EuroBasket 2000–2020 Dream Team Rest of Europe ==
The 2000–2020 FIBA EuroBasket Dream Team for the Rest of Europe consisted of the 5 best players by position, of the lower tier level FIBA European national team competitions, for the years 2000 to 2020.

Position	2000–2020 FIBA EuroBasket Dream Team Rest of Europe
PG	(North Macedonia) Bo McCalebb
SG	(Iceland) Jón Stefánsson
SF	(Hungary) Ádám Hanga
PF	(Bosnia and Herzegovina) Mirza Teletović
C	(North Macedonia) Pero Antić

== See also ==
- FIBA EuroBasket
- FIBA EuroBasket Records
- FIBA EuroBasket MVP
- FIBA World Cup
- FIBA World Cup Records
- FIBA World Cup MVP
- FIBA World Cup All-Tournament Team
- FIBA's 50 Greatest Players (1991)
