= Jacques Perrier (basketball) =

French basketball player

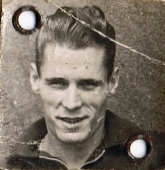
- Jacques Perrier

Personal information
- Born: 12 October 1924 Bagnolet, Paris, France
- Died: 23 June 2015 (aged 90) Grimaud, Var, France
- Listed height: 5 ft 10 in (1.78 m)
- Position: Shooting guard

Career highlights
- French Basketball Hall of Fame (2006); National Order of Merit (France) (1999); EuroBasket Top Scorer (1947)
Medals
Representing France
Men's basketball
Summer Olympics
Silver medal – second place	1948 London

Jacques Perrier (12 October 1924 – 23 June 2015) was a French basketball player. He was inducted into the French Basketball Hall of Fame, in 2006.

== French national team ==
Perrier was the leading scorer of the EuroBasket 1947. He also played at the 1948 Summer Olympic Games. He was a part of the senior French national team that won the silver medal.
