= Paweł Stok =

Polish basketball player (1913–1993)

Medal record

Representing Poland

Men's basketball

European Championships
| Bronze medal – third place | 1939 Lithuania | Team competition |

Paweł Stanisław Stok (22 March 1913 in Tarnopol – 18 August 1993 in Kraków) was a Polish basketball player who competed in the 1936 Summer Olympics.

He was part of the Polish basketball team that finished fourth in the Olympic tournament. He played three matches for the national team.
