= Giorgos Kolokithas =

Greek basketball player (1945–2013)

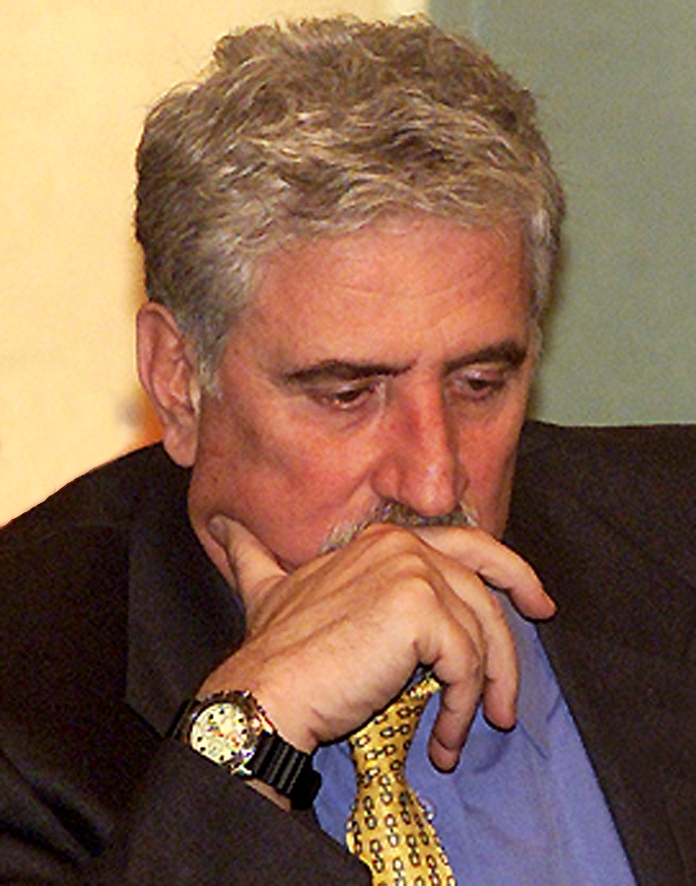
- Kolokithas, in 2009.

Personal information
- Born: November 2, 1945 Korinthos, Greece
- Died: March 2, 2013 (aged 67) Greece
- Listed height: 6 ft 6.75 in (2.00 m)
- Listed weight: 210 lb (95 kg)

Career information
- Playing career: 1960–1972
- Position: Shooting guard / small forward / power forward
- Number: 7

Career history
- 1960–1965: Sporting
- 1965–1972: Panathinaikos

Career highlights
- FIBA's 50 Greatest Players (1991); FIBA European OQT Top Scorer (1968); 2× FIBA EuroBasket Top Scorer (1967, 1969); FIBA European Selection (1970); 4× Greek League champion (1967, 1969, 1971, 1972); 3× Greek League Top Scorer (1964, 1966, 1967)
Medals
| Event | 1st | 2nd | 3rd |
|---|---|---|---|
| Balkan Championship | 0 | 2 | 2 |
| Total | 0 | 2 | 2 |
Men's basketball
Representing Greece
Balkan Championship
| Silver medal – second place | 1963 Greece | |
| Silver medal – second place | 1969 Greece | |
| Bronze medal – third place | 1966 Bulgaria | |
| Bronze medal – third place | 1967 Yugoslavia | |

Giorgos Kolokithas (alternate spelling: Georgios and Kolokythas; Greek: Γεώργιος (Γιώργος) Κολοκυθάς; November 2, 1945 – March 2, 2013) was a Greek professional basketball player. He is considered to have been one of the best scorers and players in Greek basketball history, and as a player, he had the nickname of "Basket Machine". He was a member of the FIBA European Selection team in 1970. Kolokithas was named one of FIBA's 50 Greatest Players in 1991.

== Club career ==
Kolokithas played in his club career with the Greek clubs Sporting and Panathinaikos. While playing with Panathinaikos, he won four Greek League championships, in the years 1967, 1969, 1971, and 1972. He scored a total of 3,529 points in the Greek League. His personal single-game scoring record in the Greek League was 51 points, which came in a game during the 1966–67 season. In the 1963–64, 1965–66, and 1966–67 seasons, he was the Greek League Top Scorer.

In European-wide club competition, with Panathinaikos, he made it to the semifinals of the FIBA European Cup Winners' Cup in the 1968–69 season, and to the semifinals of the FIBA European Champions' Cup (EuroLeague) in the 1971–72 season. He was a member of the FIBA European Selection team in 1970. He retired from playing pro club basketball at the age of 28, after suffering a bad knee injury.

== National team career ==
Kolokithas was a member of the senior men's Greek national team. With Greece, he won two silver medals and two bronze medals at the Balkan Championship. He also played with Greece at the 1964 FIBA European Olympic Qualifying Tournament, where he averaged 13.9 points per game, at the 1965 FIBA EuroBasket, where he averaged 10.9 points per game, and at the 1967 Mediterranean Games.

At the 1967 FIBA EuroBasket, Kolokithas was the Top Scorer of the tournament. During that tournament, he scored a total of 229 points, for a scoring average of 25.4 points per game. He also represented Greece at the 1968 FIBA European Olympic Qualifying Tournament, where he led the tournament in scoring, with an average of 22.8 points per game.

At the 1969 FIBA EuroBasket, he was also the Top Scorer of the tournament. At that tournament, he scored a total of 161 points, for a scoring average of 23.0 points per game. Overall, he had 25 caps (games played) at the FIBA EuroBasket, in which he scored a total of 492 points, for a scoring average of 19.7 points per game.

In total, Kolokithas had 90 caps with the senior Greek national team, in which he scored a total of 1,807 points, for a scoring average of 20.1 points per game. In 1971, Kolokithas retired from Greece's national squad, after he scored 36 points in his last national team game, which was against Scotland.

== Executive career ==
After he retired from playing club basketball, Kolokithas later became the President of all the Greek national teams, and the Vice President of the Hellenic Basketball Federation (EOK).

== Awards and accomplishments ==
=== Pro career ===
- 3× Greek League Top Scorer: (1964, 1966, 1967)
- 4× Greek League Champion: (1967, 1969, 1971, 1972)
- FIBA European Selection: (1970)
- FIBA's 50 Greatest Players: (1991)

=== Greece national team ===
- 1963 Balkan Championship: Silver
- 1966 Balkan Championship: Bronze
- 1967 Balkan Championship: Bronze
- 1969 Balkan Championship: Silver
- 2× FIBA EuroBasket Top Scorer: (1967, 1969)
- FIBA European Olympic Qualifying Tournament Top Scorer: (1968)

== Death ==
Kolokithas died, after suffering a heart attack, on March 2, 2013.
