= FIBA EuroBasket MVP =

Basketball award

The FIBA EuroBasket MVP is the FIBA Europe honor that is bestowed upon the Most Valuable Player of each FIBA EuroBasket tournament. Pau Gasol and Krešimir Ćosić share the record for most EuroBasket MVP awards, with two each. Modestas Paulauskas is the youngest player to receive the award.

== EuroBasket MVPs ==
†	Inducted into the FIBA Hall of Fame
*	Inducted into the FIBA Hall of Fame and the Naismith Memorial Basketball Hall of Fame
Player (X)	Denotes the number of times the player had been selected the MVP at that time

Tournament	MVP
1935	(Spain) Rafael Martín
1937	(Lithuania) Pranas Talzūnas
1939	(Lithuania) Mykolas Ruzgys (de facto: (Lithuania) Pranas Lubinas)^{‡}
1946	(Hungary) Ferenc Németh
1947	(Soviet Union) Joann Lõssov
1949	(Turkey) Hüseyin Öztürk
1951	(Czechoslovakia) Ivan Mrázek
1953	(Soviet Union) Anatoly Konev
1955	(Hungary) János Greminger
1957	(Czechoslovakia) Jiří Baumruk
1959	(Soviet Union) Viktor Zubkov
1961	(Socialist Federal Republic of Yugoslavia) Radivoj Korać†
1963	(Spain) Emiliano Rodríguez†
1965	(Soviet Union) Modestas Paulauskas
1967	(Czechoslovakia) Jiří Zedníček
1969	(Soviet Union) Sergei Belov*
1971	(Socialist Federal Republic of Yugoslavia) Krešimir Ćosić
1973	(Spain) Wayne Brabender
1975	(Socialist Federal Republic of Yugoslavia) Krešimir Ćosić (2)
1977	(Socialist Federal Republic of Yugoslavia) Dražen Dalipagić
1979	(Israel) Miki Berkovich
1981	(Soviet Union) Valdis Valters
1983	(Spain) Juan Antonio Corbalán
1985	(Soviet Union) Arvydas Sabonis*
1987	(Greece) Nikos Galis*
1989	(Socialist Federal Republic of Yugoslavia) Dražen Petrović*
1991	(Socialist Federal Republic of Yugoslavia) Toni Kukoč
1993	(Germany) Chris Welp
1995	(Lithuania) Šarūnas Marčiulionis*
1997	(Federal Republic of Yugoslavia) Saša Đorđević
1999	(Italy) Gregor Fučka
2001	(Federal Republic of Yugoslavia) Peja Stojaković
2003	(Lithuania) Šarūnas Jasikevičius
2005	(Germany) Dirk Nowitzki
2007	(Russia) Andrei Kirilenko
2009	(Spain) Pau Gasol
2011	(Spain) Juan Carlos Navarro
2013	(France) Tony Parker
2015	(Spain) Pau Gasol (2)
2017	(Slovenia) Goran Dragić
2022	(Spain) Willy Hernangómez
2025	(Germany) Dennis Schröder

=== Most times MVP ===
Number	Player	Years
2	(Socialist Federal Republic of Yugoslavia) Krešimir Ćosić	1971, 1975
2	(Spain) Pau Gasol	2009, 2015

Last update: after EuroBasket 2025

== See also ==
- FIBA EuroBasket
- FIBA EuroBasket Records
- FIBA EuroBasket Top Scorer
- FIBA EuroBasket All-Tournament Team
- FIBA World Cup
- FIBA World Cup Records
- FIBA World Cup MVP
- FIBA World Cup All-Tournament Team
- FIBA's 50 Greatest Players (1991)
