= Ivan Mrázek =

Czech basketball player and coach (1926–2019)

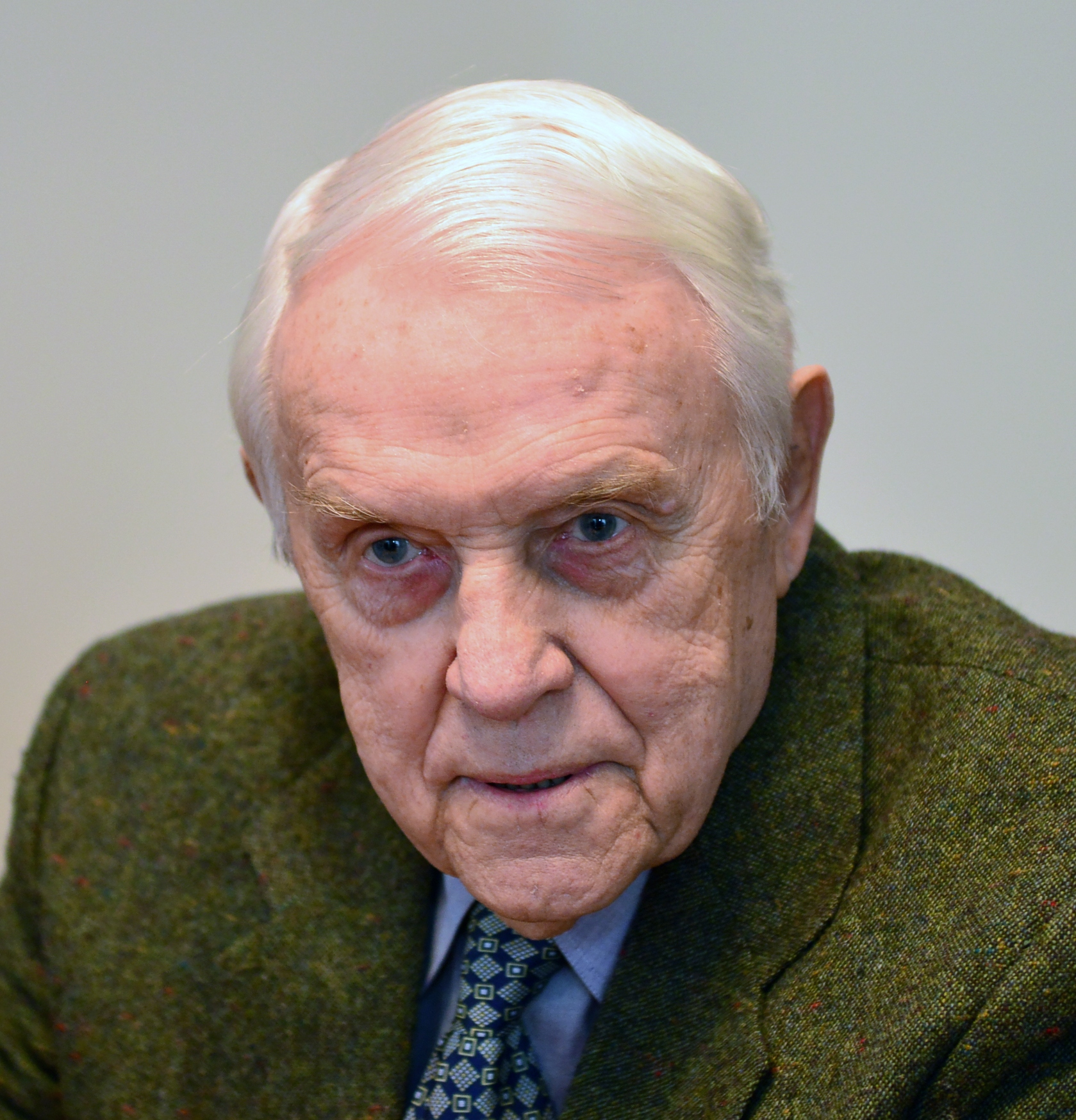
- Ivo “Ivan” Mrázek in 2014

Personal information
- Born: 18 January 1926 Brno, Czechoslovakia
- Died: 4 April 2019 (aged 93)
- Listed height: 5 ft 7.5 in (1.71 m)
- Listed weight: 165 lb (75 kg)

Career information
- Playing career: 1946–1957
- Position: Point guard
- Coaching career: 1957–1970

Career history

Playing
- 1946–1957: Brno

Coaching
- 1957–1969: Brno
- 1960, 1963: Czechoslovakia
- 1969–1970: Petrarca Padova

Career highlights
- As player: 6× Czechoslovak League champion (1947, 1948 2×, 1949, 1950, 1951); FIBA EuroBasket Top Scorer (1951); FIBA EuroBasket MVP (1951); FIBA's 50 Greatest Players (1991); Czechoslovak 20th Century Team (2001); As head coach: 6× Czechoslovak League champion (1958, 1962, 1963, 1964, 1967, 1968)
Medals
Representing Czechoslovakia
Men's basketball
EuroBasket
Gold medal – first place	1946 Switzerland
Silver medal – second place	1947 Czechoslovakia
Silver medal – second place	1951 France
Silver medal – second place	1955 Hungary

Ivo "Ivan" Mrázek (18 January 1926 – 4 April 2019) was a Czech professional basketball player and coach. At 5'7 1/2" (1.71 m) tall, he was a point guard. He was named one of FIBA's 50 Greatest Players, in 1991.

== Playing career ==
=== Club career ===
In his club career, Mrázek won 6 Czechoslovak League championships (1947, 1948 2×, 1949, 1950, 1951).

=== National team career ===
Mrázek helped lead the senior Czechoslovakia national team to a EuroBasket gold medal at the EuroBasket 1946, as well as to three EuroBasket silver medals (1947, 1951, and 1955). Mrázek was the MVP and top scorer of EuroBasket 1951. He also represented Czechoslovakia in two Summer Olympic Games (1948 and 1952).

== Coaching career ==
In his head basketball coaching career, Mrázek was a 6 time Czechoslovak League champion (1958, 1962, 1963, 1964, 1967, 1968).

== Personal life ==
Mrázek was born named Ivo, but he was called Ivan by many, including his mother. Mrázek died on 4 April 2019. He was 93 years old.
