= Ahmed Idlibi =

Lebanese basketball player

Ahmed Idlibi is a Lebanese former basketball player. He led EuroBasket 1953 in scoring, averaging 15.9 points per game. His most notable performance was against Sweden, with a 34-point outburst. Idlibi was also a member of the Lebanese national team that finished seventh at EuroBasket 1949.
