= Atanas Golomeev =

Bulgarian basketball player and coach (1947–2023)

Personal information
- Born: 5 July 1947 Sofia, Bulgaria
- Died: 12 August 2023 (aged 76)
- Listed height: 6 ft 10 in (2.08 m)
- Listed weight: 230 lb (104 kg)

Career information
- College: McGill (1968–1969)
- Playing career: 1965–1984
- Position: Center
- Coaching career: 1985–1986

Career history

Playing
- 1965–1968: CSKA Sofia
- 1969–1974: Academic Sofia
- 1974–1981: Levski Sofia
- 1981–1983: Adana
- 1983–1984: Levski Sofia

Coaching
- 1985–1986: Levski Sofia

Career highlights
- As a player: 2× FIBA EuroBasket Top Scorer (1973, 1975); FIBA European Selection (1977); 10× Bulgarian League champion (1967, 1968, 1970–1973, 1978, 1979, 1981, 1982); 4× Bulgarian Cup winner (1976, 1979, 1982, 1983); FIBA's 50 Greatest Players (1991); As a head coach: Bulgarian League champion (1986)
- FIBA Hall of Fame

Atanas Golomeev (Bulgarian: Атанас Голомеев 5 July 1947 – 12 August 2023) was a Bulgarian professional basketball player and coach. At a height of 2.08 m (6 ft 10 in) tall, he played at the center position. He is the most decorated Bulgarian basketball player of all time. He was named one of FIBA's 50 Greatest Players, in 1991. In 2019, he was inducted into the FIBA Hall of Fame.

== College career ==
Golomeev played college basketball at McGill University, with the McGill Redmen, in the 1968–69 season. He played in 24 games, and averaged 37.5 points per game, with a single-game scoring high of 57 points.

== Club career ==
During his club career, Golomeev won 10 Bulgarian League championships (1967, 1968, 1970, 1971, 1972, 1973, 1978, 1979, 1981, and 1982), and 4 Bulgarian Cups (1976, 1979, 1982, and 1983).

== National team career ==
As a member of the senior men's Bulgarian national basketball team, Golomeev participated in five EuroBasket competitions (1969, 1971, 1973, 1975, and 1977). At the EuroBasket 1973 and EuroBasket 1975, he was the top scorer of the tournament, scoring 156 and 160 points respectively. He earned EuroBasket All-Tournament Team selections four times, in 1971, 1973, 1975, and 1977.

== Death ==
Atanas Golomeev died on 12 August 2023, at the age of 76.
