= Livio Franceschini =

Italian basketball player (1913–1975)

Medal record

Representing Italy

Men's basketball

European Championships
Silver medal – second place	1937 Latvia	Team competition

Livio Franceschini (14 April 1913 – 20 November 1975) was an Italian basketball player who competed in the 1936 Summer Olympics. He was born and died in Trieste. Franceschini was part of the Italian basketball team that finished seventh in the Olympic tournament. He played four matches.
