= Hüseyin Öztürk =

Turkish basketball player

Personal information
- Born: 1928 (age 97–98) Çorum, Turkey
- Listed height: 1.96 m (6 ft 5 in)
- Position: Forward

Career history
- Galatasaray

Career highlights
- 1949 EuroBasket MVP

Hüseyin Öztürk (born 1928) is a Turkish former basketball player.

Öztürk was born in Çorum. He emigrated to the United States with his family and played basketball there during his student years. He was later recommended to Galatasaray in Istanbul by his father. He won the Istanbul Men's Basketball League championships with Galatasaray.

== Turkish national team ==
As a member of the senior Turkish national basketball team, Öztürk led the 1949 EuroBasket in scoring average, at 19.3 points per game. His performance earned him the tournament's MVP award, as Turkey finished the tournament in fourth place. He wore the national team jersey 13 times and was the team captain 5 times.
