= Mieczysław Młynarski =

Polish basketball player and coach (1956–2025)

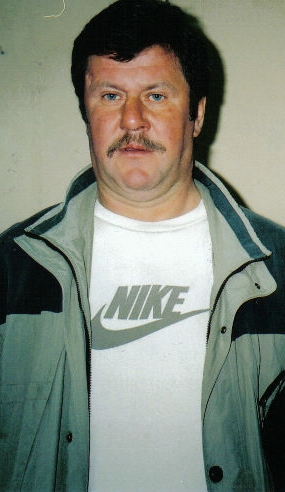
- Młynarski in 2007

Personal information
- Born: 17 May 1956 Resko, Poland
- Died: 20 June 2025 (aged 69)
- Listed height: 6 ft 6.5 in (199 cm)
- Listed weight: 200 lb (91 kg)

Career information
- Playing career: 1973–1994
- Position: Small forward
- Coaching career: 2007–2017

Career history

Playing
- 1973–1987: Górnik Wałbrzych
- 1987–1988: Lech Poznań
- 1988–1994: SVD 49 Dortmund

Coaching
- 2007–2009: Górnik Wałbrzych (assistant)
- 2009: Górnik Wałbrzych
- 2009–2012: Nowe Miasto / KS Dark Dog Górnik Wałbrzych
- 2016–2017: Prakto Polonia Świdnica

Career highlights
- 2× FIBA EuroBasket Top Scorer (1979, 1981); FIBA European Selection (1981); Polish League champion (1982); Polish League Player of the Year (1981); 4× Polish League Top Scorer (1980, 1981, 1983, 1984)

Mieczysław Młynarski (17 May 1956 – 20 June 2025) was a Polish professional basketball player and coach. At a height of 1.99 m (6'6 1/2") and a weight of 91 kg (200 lbs.), he played at the small forward position during his playing career.

== Club career ==
Młynarski still holds the Polish Basketball League record, for the "most points scored in one game" (90 points scored, achieved in 1982, while playing with Górnik Wałbrzych, in a game against Pogoń Szczecin). He was a member of the FIBA European Selection team, in 1981.

== National team career ==
Młynarski was a regular member of the senior Polish national basketball team, for nine years (1975–1984). He played in all of Poland's games, during the Summer Olympic Games, in Moscow, 1980. He was the top scorer of both EuroBasket 1979 (26.6 points per game), and EuroBasket 1981 (23.1 points per game).

== Coaching career ==
When Młynarski's playing career ended, he decided to stay in basketball. After retirement from playing, he became a coach of the Polish club Górnik Wałbrzych's juniors team. In 2000, he won the Polish older juniors vice-championship (as the assistant coach) with Górnik.

In 2007, he became the assistant coach of Górnik Wałbrzych's senior club. After the club's head coach, Andrzej Adamek's resignation (in March 2009), Młynarski became Górnik's new head coach. Unfortunately, Młynarski was not able to avoid his team's poor performance. In the 2008–09 season, Górnik finished in last place in the Polish PLK League. The main reason why the team was relegated was its deep financial problems (Górnik finished the season without any foreign players, and some key Polish players, e.g. Marcin Stefański).

== Personal life and death ==
Młynarski was born on 17 May 1956. He died on 20 June 2025, at the age of 69.

== Awards and accomplishments ==
=== Club playing career ===
- 4× Polish League Top Scorer: (1980, 1981, 1983, 1984)
- Polish League Player of the Year: (1981)
- FIBA European Selection: (1981)
- Polish League Champion: (1982)

=== Polish senior national team ===
- 2× FIBA EuroBasket Top Scorer: (1979, 1981)
