= Heino Veskila =

Estonian basketball player

Personal information
- Born: 14 December 1918 Tartu, Estonia
- Died: 22 August 1941 (aged 22) Tartu, Estonia
- Listed height: 1.83 m (6 ft 0 in)
- Position: Forward

Career history
- 1935–1938: Tartu NMKÜ (YMCA)
- 1938–1940: Tartu EASK
- 1940–1941: Tartu Dünamo

Heino Veskila (14 December 1918 – 22 August 1941) was an Estonian basketball player who played for Tartu YMCA, Tartu EASK and Tartu Dünamo. He also represented the Estonia men's national basketball team internationally.

== Career ==
Veskila competed for Estonia in the 1936 Summer Olympics in basketball. A record he set was being the youngest participant among all basketball players, at the age of 17. He averaged 13 points per game, including 20 against the USA, out of Estonia's total of 28.

Veskila made the All-Tournament Team at the EuroBasket 1937 and was the leading scorer at the EuroBasket 1939, with 116 points in seven games. He earned 17 caps in basketball for the Estonian national team.

Veskila was executed by German occupation forces on 22 July 1941.

== Awards and accomplishments ==
- EuroBasket 1937 All-Tournament Team
- EuroBasket 1939 Leading Scorer
