= Alberto Herreros =

Spanish basketball player (born 1969)

Personal information
- Born: 20 April 1969 (age 57) Madrid, Spain
- Listed height: 200 cm (6 ft 7 in)
- Listed weight: 98 kg (216 lb)

Career information
- Playing career: 1988–2005
- Position: Small forward

Career history
- 1988–1996: Estudiantes
- 1996–2005: Real Madrid

Career highlights
- FIBA EuroBasket Top Scorer (1999); FIBA European Selection (1995); 2× FIBA EuroStar (1997, 1998); FIBA Saporta Cup champion (1997); FIBA Saporta Cup Finals MVP (1997); FIBA Saporta Cup Finals Top Scorer (1997); 2× Spanish League champion (2000, 2005); Spanish King's Cup winner (1992); 6× Spanish League All-Star (1989, 1990, 1995, 1997–1999); 2× Spanish League All-Star Game MVP (1995, 1999); 2× Spanish League 3 Point Shootout Champion (1997, 1998); Spanish League all-time leading scorer; Spanish League all-time leader in three-pointers made
Medals
Men's basketball
Representing Spain
FIBA EuroBasket
Silver medal – second place	1999 France
Silver medal – second place	2003 Sweden

Alberto Herreros Ros (Note: In this Spanish name, the first or paternal surname is Herreros and the second or maternal family name is Ros.) a.k.a Gusito (born 20 April 1969) is a retired Spanish professional basketball player. At a height of 2.00 m (6'6 3/4") tall, he played at the small forward position. He is considered to be one of the best Spanish basketball players and shooters of all-time, as he is the Spanish ACB League's all-time leader in both three-pointers made and total points scored. He played with Estudiantes and Real Madrid. Herreros works as a basketball executive for Real Madrid.

== Professional career ==
Herreros started his career with Estudiantes. In 1996 he was signed by crosstown rivals Real Madrid who paid 250 million pesetas (almost 1,5 million euros). It was the most expensive basketball transfer in Spain at the time.

In 2005, Herreros made a three-point shot in the last seconds of the playoff finals of the Liga ACB, against TAU Cerámica, that gave his team Real Madrid, the win, and the Spanish League championship. It was his last game before his retirement as a professional basketball player.

During his pro career, he played 19,218 minutes (2nd most) in 654 games (7th most) in the Spanish ACB League. He is the Liga ACB's all-time leader in points scored (9,759) and 3-point field goals made (1,233).

== National team career ==
Herreros was the 1998 FIBA World Championship's Top Scorer, and was named to the All-Tournament Team. In 1999 EuroBasket, Herreros again became the Top Scorer of the tournament and was named to the All-Tournament Team, and reached, along with the Spanish team, the tournament's final, as they won the silver medal. He also won the silver medal at the EuroBasket 2003.

He competed for Spain at the Summer Olympics in 1992 and 2000.

== Post-playing career ==
After his basketball playing career ended, Herreros worked with Real Madrid in a management position.
