= Eddy Terrace =

Belgian basketball player

Royale Union Saint Gilloise
- Position: Guard
- League: Basketball League Belgium

Personal information
- Listed height: 6 ft 0 in (1.83 m)

Career history
- 1952–1964: Royale Union Saint Gilloise

Career highlights
- EuroBasket 1957 Top Scorer

Eddy Terrace (1935 - 2013) was a Belgian basketball player, who spent most of his career with Royale Union Saint Gilloise. One of the best Belgian players of his generation, he led all scorers at EuroBasket 1957, averaging 24.4 points a game on Belgium's way to a 12th position. His 63 points outburst against Albania in the same tournament is an all-time EuroBasket record.
