= Rūdolfs Jurciņš =

Latvian basketball player

Personal information
- Born: 19 June 1909 Riga, Russian Empire
- Died: 22 May 1947 (aged 37) Molotov Oblast, Soviet Union

Career information
- Playing career: 1924–1940s
- Position: Center
Medals
Men's basketball
Representing Latvia
EuroBasket
Gold medal – first place	1935 Geneva	National Team

Rūdolfs Jurciņš (19 June 1909 – 22 May 1947) was a Latvian basketball player. He played as a center.

== Career ==
Jurciņš won a gold medal at the 1935 EuroBasket competition, becoming first European champion. He participated at the 1936 Summer Olympics, where Latvia national basketball team got 15th/18th place.

Jurciņš started to play basketball at the age of 15 in 1924. Before that, he played football. He studied in the University of Latvia but did not graduate. However he played for University basketball team Universitātes sports from 1930 until 1937. He was a member of the Latvian student fraternity Beveronija. He became a six-time Latvian champion. His debut in Latvian national basketball team was in 1928. Overall, he played 23 games in the national team and was a team captain.

He was arrested in 1945 and deported to the GULAG camp in 1947. Rūdolfs Jurciņš died on 22 July 1948 in Molotov Oblast, Soviet Union.
