= Šarūnas Marčiulionis =

Lithuanian basketball player (born 1964)

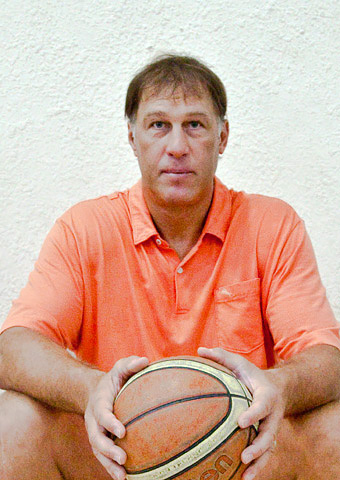
- Marčiulionis during his masterclass visit in Armenia (June 2014)

Personal information
- Born: June 13, 1964 (age 62) Kaunas, Lithuania
- Listed height: 6 ft 5 in (1.96 m)
- Listed weight: 200 lb (91 kg)

Career information
- NBA draft: 1987: 6th round, 127th overall pick
- Drafted by: Golden State Warriors
- Playing career: 1981–1997
- Position: Shooting guard
- Number: 13, 30, 8

Career history
- 1981–1989: Statyba
- 1989–1994: Golden State Warriors
- 1994–1995: Seattle SuperSonics
- 1995–1996: Sacramento Kings
- 1996–1997: Denver Nuggets

Career highlights
- 4× Lithuanian Sportsman of the Year (1987, 1989–1991); Mr. Europa (1988); FIBA's 50 Greatest Players (1991); FIBA EuroBasket MVP (1995)

Career NBA statistics
- Points: 4,631 (12.8 ppg)
- Rebounds: 819 (2.3 rpg)
- Assists: 807 (2.2 apg)
- Stats at NBA.com
- Stats at Basketball Reference
- Basketball Hall of Fame
- FIBA Hall of Fame
Medals
Men's basketball
Representing the Soviet Union
Summer Olympic Games
Gold medal – first place	1988 Seoul
FIBA EuroBasket
Silver medal – second place	1987 Greece
Bronze medal – third place	1989 Yugoslavia
FIBA U19 World Cup
Silver medal – second place	1983 Spain	Under-19
European Championship for Juniors
Gold medal – first place	1982 Bulgaria	Under-18
Representing Lithuania
Summer Olympics
Bronze medal – third place	1992 Barcelona
Bronze medal – third place	1996 Atlanta
FIBA EuroBasket
Silver medal – second place	1995 Greece

Raimondas Šarūnas Marčiulionis (Lithuanian: [ˈrɐ̂ˑɪ̯mɔndɐs ʃɐˈrûːnɐs mɐrʲtɕʊˈlʲôːnʲɪs]; born June 13, 1964) is a Lithuanian former professional basketball player. Widely considered one of the greatest international players, he was one of the first Europeans to become a regular in the National Basketball Association (NBA). Marčiulionis was inducted into the Naismith Memorial Basketball Hall of Fame in 2014 and became a member of the FIBA Hall of Fame in 2015.

In the 1988 Summer Olympics, together with teammate Arvydas Sabonis, Marčiulionis led the senior USSR national team to the gold medal. With the senior Lithuanian national team, he won two Summer Olympics bronze medals, in 1992 and 1996. He was an All-Tournament Team member, the top scorer, and the MVP of the EuroBasket 1995, and he was also elected to the All-EuroBasket Team in 1987.

Marčiulionis is also often remembered for and associated with the Euro step move during his seven seasons playing in the NBA, which was popularized by Manu Ginóbili in the mid-2000s.

== Early life ==
Marčiulionis was the second son of Laimutė, a geography teacher, and Juozas, an engineer. Given that Laimutė aggravated a spinal injury while giving birth to his sister Zita, her determination in having a son led to the middle name Šarūnas, invoking a legendary knight from Vincas Krėvė-Mickevičius's works. Growing up in Kaunas, Marčiulionis took up tennis while growing up, being an ambidextrous player focused on forehands. Given his unorthodox technique, and an increasingly bulky frame, he eventually gave up on the sport.

At the age of 13, following a hospitalization caused by the use of makeshift explosives, Marčiulionis changed to the sport of basketball. In the Lithuanian Soviet Socialist Republic, he and his friends had to build their own outdoor basketball court in a parking lot. When he moved to Vilnius, to study journalism at Vilnius State University of Vincas Kapsukas, and possibly try out for the Soviet junior national team, all Marčiulionis' parents could provide him was, "one bag containing a very small amount of clothes, and another full of apples."

== Professional career ==
=== Statyba ===
While Marčiulionis attended college, he rarely played basketball, but he eventually attracted a scout from Statyba, of the USSR Premier League, in 1981. He would play with Statyba, in the USSR League, from 1981 to 1989.

=== NBA ===
During a 1985 game against Athletes in Action, in Vilnius, Marčiulionis struck up a friendship with one of the opposing players, Donnie Nelson, despite the language barrier. Nelson's father Don Nelson would later be the head coach of the Golden State Warriors, and what he said about Marčiulionis' skills led the Warriors to draft him in the 6th round of the 1987 NBA draft. Stan Kasten, president and general manager of the Atlanta Hawks, managed to void the pick by showing Marčiulionis was age 23, one year older than the age the draft rules prescribed for European players. As of 2024, Marčiulionis was the last NBA player to have his selection ineligible in an NBA draft due to him being above the draft age limitations at the time of his initial selection. The Hawks then pursued Marčiulionis using then-owner Ted Turner's connections with the Soviet Union, inviting him and other Soviet players to their training camp, and arranging for Hawks–USSR matches in Moscow, in 1988. While Marčiulionis signed a contract with Atlanta, the day after he won the gold medal in the 1988 Summer Olympics, the team wound up not submitting it to the NBA's offices, as the Soviets said they would not permit the player to leave.

Eventually, Nelson's influence helped Marčiulionis with his social projects in Vilnius, and led him to remain with the Warriors, with whom he signed a three-year $3.8 million contract, in 1989. Marčiulionis became the first Soviet player to join the North American league, and played four years with the Warriors, finishing as the runner-up for the Sixth Man of the Year Award in 1992. Marčiulionis became one of the first Europeans to get significant playing time in the NBA, helping to lead the way for the internationalization of the league in the late 1990s. After missing a year and a half with a leg injury, he was traded, along with Byron Houston, to the Seattle SuperSonics in 1994 in exchange for Carlos Rogers, Ricky Pierce, and two 1995 second-round draft picks. In 1995, Marčiulionis and Houston were traded to the Sacramento Kings for Frank Brickowski. He finished his NBA career with the Denver Nuggets, in the 1996–97 season.

== National team career ==
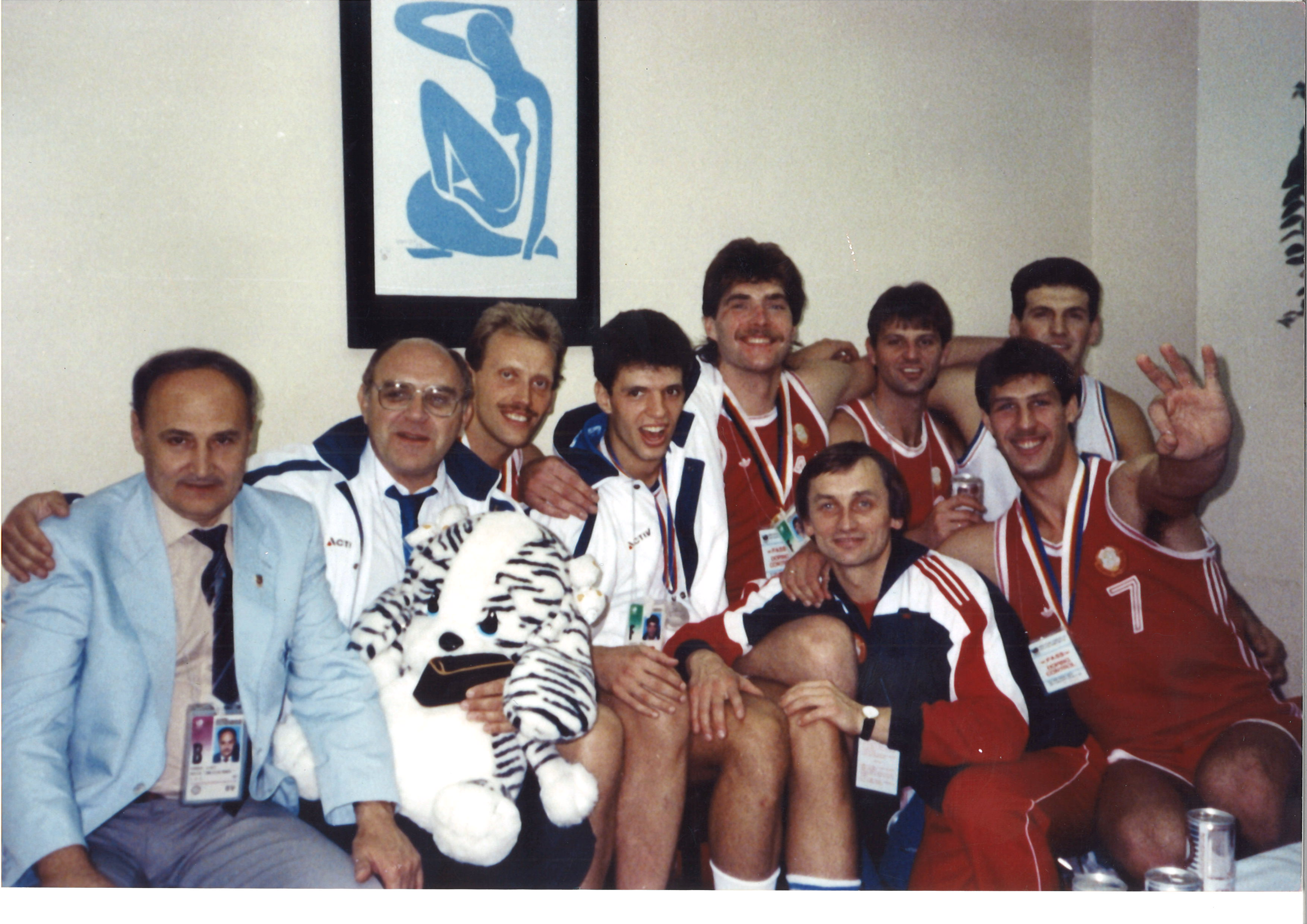
Marčiulionis after winning the 1988 Summer Olympics basketball tournament with the Soviet Union men's national team

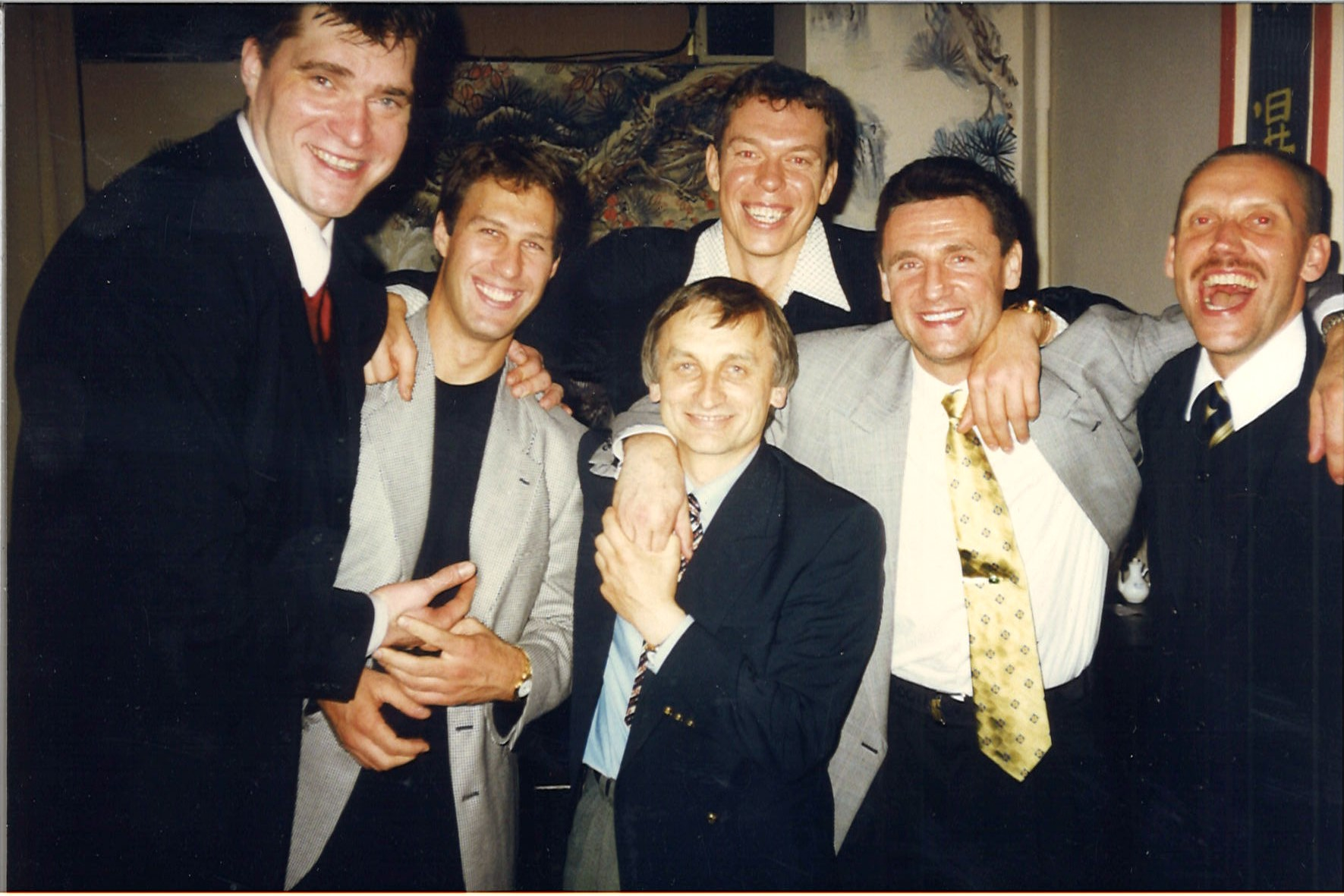
Marčiulionis with his former Soviet Union men's national team teammates with whom he won the 1988 Summer Olympics basketball tournament. Following Lithuania's independence restoration in 1990, Olympic champions Marčiulionis, Arvydas Sabonis, Valdemaras Chomičius, Rimas Kurtinaitis played for the Lithuania men's national team.

=== Soviet Union national team ===
In 1982 and 1983, Marčiulionis played sparingly with the Soviet juniors. He won a gold medal at the 1982 FIBA Europe Under-18 Championship, and a silver medal at the 1983 FIBA Under-19 World Cup, in Spain. Marčiulionis was frequently the last man cut from the senior Soviet Union national basketball team training camps, until he finally got his chance with the senior team in 1987, having a breakout performance, while winning a silver medal at the EuroBasket 1987. Marčiulionis would also be one of the standout players, as the Soviets won the gold medal at the 1988 Summer Olympics.

=== Lithuania national team ===
Following the restoration of Lithuanian independence, in 1990, Marčiulionis almost single-handedly resurrected the senior Lithuanian national team. He contacted prospective players, encouraged several to join, selected the uniforms, negotiated a shoe deal, and arranged for sponsorships, along with friend Donnie Nelson. Sponsor deals struck by him included Bank of America and the rock band Grateful Dead, who were interested in supporting Lithuania after reading a story on Marčiulionis and the national team in the San Francisco Chronicle. The Grateful Dead also helped launch a line of tie-dyed jerseys, that would feature Lithuania's national colors, along with a slam dunking skeleton, created by New York artist Greg Speirs. Speirs became a major sponsor when he donated 100% of his profits from his design to fund the team, and to Lithuanian children's charities, amounting to at least $450,000. Marčiulionis ultimately raised $200,000 for Lithuania men's national team's participation at the 1992 Summer Olympics and the team went on to win a bronze medal, defeating the Unified Team, 82–78, which was composed from players of the former Soviet Union states, except for Baltic states, in the bronze game.

Marčiulionis was again a bronze medalist with Lithuania, at the 1996 Summer Olympics. In 1995, he was named the MVP of the 1995 FIBA EuroBasket, after leading Lithuania to a silver medal in the tournament. In 1987, 1989, 1990, and 1991, he was voted the best sportsman in Lithuania.

Marčiulionis' basketball career and journey to represent his native country Lithuania in the 1992 Barcelona Olympics is highlighted in the documentary film "The Other Dream Team". The film premiered at the Sundance Film Festival in 2012 and was distributed by Lionsgate in the U.S. and Disney internationally.

== Post-playing career ==
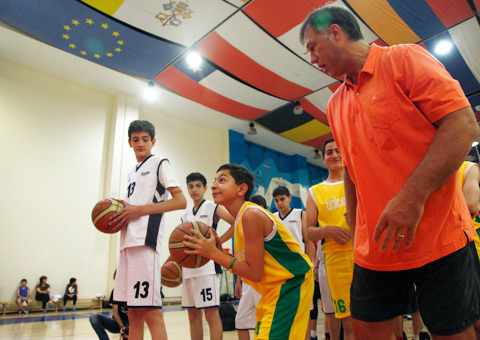
Marčiulionis training young players in Armenia

In 1992, Marčiulionis opened the Šarūnas Hotel in Vilnius. In 1993, he founded the Lithuanian Basketball League (LKL), and also became its president. In 1999, Marčiulionis founded the North European Basketball League (NEBL), and also became its commissioner. The NEBL would later be absorbed into the Baltic Basketball League. Today, he is one of the most successful businessmen in Lithuania. He was also the President of the Šarūnas Marčiulionis Basketball Academy.

On February 14, 2014, Marčiulionis was announced as a 2014 player inductee, by the Naismith Memorial Basketball Hall of Fame; he formally entered the Hall on August 8. On September 19, 2015, Marčiulionis was inducted into the FIBA Hall of Fame.

On October 2, 2015, it was announced that Šarūnas Hotel was closed. The nearby Šarūnas Marčiulionis Basketball academy meanwhile, was closed after the 2015–16 season.

On May 26, 2019, Marčiulionis was elected to the European Parliament to serve in the Ninth European Parliament. However, on May 28, he announced that he decided to give up his seat in the European Parliament.

== Personal life ==
Even with language barriers, Marčiulionis was a devoted teammate, and active in the communities he played in. In 1987, he helped a Panevėžys man get an artificial heart valve for his son, by appealing to Donnie Nelson, who arranged an operation for the teenager in the United States. In the aftermath of the 1989 San Francisco earthquake, Marčiulionis appeared at the site of a commuter train accident, wearing his Warriors warm up outfit, and he helped by pulling out trapped passengers and administering first aid.

After he joined the Warriors, Marčiulionis's wife Inga enrolled at Merritt College, where she walked on to their women's basketball team and was a star player for two seasons. She became one of 147 women in women's college basketball history to score 50 or more points in a college game while at Merritt College, and joined the faculty of Merritt College after graduating. She served as head coach of Merritt's women's basketball team, and is now the head of their kinesiology department.

Marčiulionis and Inga are divorced and have one daughter. Inga lives in the United States and continues her work at Merritt College.

Marčiulionis married Laura Mikelionytė on March 10, 2012, who took the name Laura Marčiulionė.

Šarūnas' son Augustas Marčiulionis made his debut in the Lithuanian Basketball League on September 19, 2020, as a member of his father's first professional team Rytas Vilnius. Augustas played on an amateur contract to preserve his eligibility to play NCAA basketball, and on June 16, 2021, signed a letter of intent to play at Saint Mary's College starting in the 2021–22 season. In 2026, Augustas was included in the final roster of the Lithuania senior national team for the 2027 FIBA Basketball World Cup qualification on August 28–31, and received his first playing time in official games and was one of Lithuania's leaders (averaged 13 points, 1.5 rebounds, 4 assists in two games). Šarūnas and Augustas is the second father-son duo to play for the Lithuania national team (the first father-son duo is Arvydas Sabonis and Domantas Sabonis).

== NBA career statistics ==
Legend
GP	Games played	GS	Games started	MPG	Minutes per game
FG%	Field goal percentage	3P%	3-point field goal percentage	FT%	Free throw percentage
RPG	Rebounds per game	APG	Assists per game	SPG	Steals per game
BPG	Blocks per game	PPG	Points per game	**Bold**	Career high

=== Regular season ===
Year	Team	GP	GS	MPG	FG%	3P%	FT%	RPG	APG	SPG	BPG	PPG
1989–90	Golden State	**75**	3	22.6	.519	.256	.787	2.9	1.6	1.3	**.1**	12.1
1990–91	Golden State	50	**10**	19.7	.501	.167	.724	2.4	1.7	1.2	**.1**	10.9
1991–92	Golden State	72	5	**29.4**	.538	.300	.788	2.9	3.4	**1.6**	**.1**	**18.9**
1992–93	Golden State	30	8	27.9	**.543**	.200	.761	**3.2**	**3.5**	.8	**.1**	17.4
1994–95	Seattle	66	4	18.1	.473	.402	.732	1.0	1.7	1.0	.0	9.3
1995–96	Sacramento	53	0	19.6	.452	**.408**	.775	1.5	1.0	1.3	**.1**	10.8
1996–97	Denver	17	0	15.0	.376	.367	**.806**	1.8	1.5	.7	**.1**	6.8
Career		363	30	22.4	.505	.369	.768	2.3	2.2	1.3	.1	12.8

=== Playoffs ===
Year	Team	GP	GS	MPG	FG%	3P%	FT%	RPG	APG	SPG	BPG	PPG
1991	Golden State	**9**	0	22.9	.500	.000	**.897**	**2.6**	3.0	1.2	.1	13.2
1992	Golden State	4	0	**33.3**	**.532**	**.500**	.829	2.3	**5.0**	.8	**.3**	**21.3**
1996	Sacramento	4	0	25.3	.276	.222	.600	1.8	3.5	**2.5**	.0	7.3
Career		17	0	25.9	.469	.238	.821	2.3	3.6	1.4	.1	13.7

== Filmography ==
Year	Title	Role	Notes	Ref
2012	The Other Dream Team	Himself	Documentary about the Lithuania men's national basketball team at the 1992 Summer Olympics.	
2014	Arvydas Sabonis. 11	Himself	Documentary about Arvydas Sabonis, a teammate of Marčiulionis in the Soviet and Lithuania national basketball teams.	

== State awards ==
- Lithuania: Recipient of the Officer's Cross of the Order of the Lithuanian Grand Duke Gediminas (1995)
- Lithuania: Recipient of the Commander's Cross of the Order of the Lithuanian Grand Duke Gediminas (1995)
- Lithuania: Recipient of the Commander's Grand Cross of the Order of the Lithuanian Grand Duke Gediminas (1996)
