= Marian Kozłowski =

Marian Kozłowski may refer to:

- Marian Kozłowski (basketball) (1927–2004), Polish basketball administrator
- Marian Kozłowski (canoeist) (1915–1943), Polish sprint canoeist
