= Nikolai Semashko =

Nikolai Semashko may refer to:

- Nikolai Semashko (medicine) (1874–1949), Soviet medicine organizer and politician
- Nikolai Semashko (basketball) (1907–1976), Soviet sports administrator
