= List of members of the FIBA Hall of Fame =

The FIBA Hall of Fame honors players who have shown exceptional skill, all-time great teams, all-time great coaches, referees, executives, and other major contributors to the sport of basketball.

== Inductees ==
Key:

Also elected to the Naismith Memorial Basketball Hall of Fame

=== Male players ===
In total, 77 men have been inducted.

Year	Inductee	Nationality	Pos.	Achievements	Ref.
2007	Alexander Belov	Soviet Union; Russia	C	1× Olympic Games gold medalist (1972); 1× Olympic Games bronze medalist (1976); 1× FIBA World Cup gold medalist (1974); 1× FIBA World Cup bronze medalist (1970); 2× EuroBasket gold medalist (1969, 1971); 1× EuroBasket silver medalist (1975); 2× FIBA Saporta Cup champion (1973, 1975); 1× Soviet League champion (1975); 2× FIBA European Selection (1971, 1972); FIBA's 50 Greatest Players (1991)	
2007	Sergei Belov	Soviet Union; Russia	SG	1× Olympic Games gold medalist (1972); 3× Olympic Games bronze medalist (1968, 1976, 1980); 2× FIBA World Cup gold medalist (1967, 1974); 1× FIBA World Cup silver medalist (1978); 1× FIBA World Cup bronze medalist (1970); 4× EuroBasket gold medalist (1967, 1969, 1971, 1979); 2× EuroBasket silver medalist (1975, 1977); 1× EuroBasket bronze medalist (1973); 2× EuroLeague champion (1969, 1971); 11× USSR League champion (1969–1974, 1976–1980); 2× USSR Cup winner (1972, 1973); FIBA Order of Merit (1995); FIBA's 50 Greatest Players (1991); FIBA World Cup MVP (1970); FIBA EuroBasket MVP (1969); 50 Greatest EuroLeague Contributors (2008); 3× EuroLeague Finals Top Scorer (1970, 1971, 1973); 4× FIBA European Selection (1969, 1971, 1972, 1974); Honoured Master of Sports of the USSR (1968); Order of the Badge of Honour; Medal "For Distinguished Labour"	
2007	Emiliano Rodríguez	Spain	SF	4× EuroLeague champion (1964, 1965, 1967, 1968); 12× Spanish League champion (1961–1966, 1968–1973); 9× Spanish Cup winner (1961, 1962, 1965–1967, 1970–1973); FIBA Order of Merit (1997); FIBA's 50 Greatest Players (1991); 50 Greatest EuroLeague Contributors (2008); EuroBasket MVP (1963); 2× EuroLeague Finals Top Scorer (1963, 1964); 3× FIBA European Selection (1966, 1969, 1973); 2× Spanish League Top Scorer (1963, 1964)	
2007	Bill Russell	United States	C	1× Olympic Games gold medalist (1956); 11× NBA champion (1957, 1959, 1960, 1961, 1962, 1963, 1964, 1965, 1966, 1968, 1969); 2× NCAA champion (1955, 1956); 5× NBA Most Valuable Player (1958, 1961–1963, 1965); 12× NBA All-Star (1958–1969); NBA All-Star Game MVP (1963); 3× All-NBA First Team (1959, 1963, 1965); 8× All-NBA Second Team (1958, 1960–1962, 1964, 1966–1968); NBA All-Defensive First Team (1969); 4× NBA rebounding champion (1958, 1959, 1964, 1965); NBA 25th Anniversary Team; NBA 35th Anniversary Team; NBA 50th Anniversary Team; NBA 75th Anniversary Team; No. 6 retired by Boston Celtics; NCAA Tournament Most Outstanding Player (1955); UPI College Player of the Year (1956); 2× Helms Player of the Year (1955, 1956); 2× Consensus first-team All-American (1955, 1956); WCC Player of the Year (1956); No. 6 retired by San Francisco Dons	
2007	Radivoj Korać	Yugoslavia; Serbia	PF	Olympic Games silver medalist (1968); EuroBasket MVP (1961); Best Athlete of Yugoslavia (1960); Yugoslav Sportsman of the Year (1962); 2× FIBA European Selection (1964, 1965); 7× Yugoslav League Top Scorer (1957, 1958, 1960, 1962–1965); Italian League Top Scorer (1969); Belgium League Top Scorer (1968); 4× Yugoslav League champion (1958, 1960, 1963, 1964); 2× Yugoslav Cup winner (1960, 1962); Belgium League champion (1968); FIBA's 50 Greatest Players; 50 Greatest EuroLeague Contributors	
2007	Krešimir Ćosić	Yugoslavia; Croatia	C	Olympic Games gold medalist (1980); 2x Olympic Games silver medalist (1968, 1976); 2× EuroBasket MVP (1971, 1975); 6× FIBA European Selection (1968, 1970–1974); FIBA Saporta Cup champion (1982); 2× Italian League champion (1979, 1980); 6× Yugoslav League champion (1965, 1967, 1968, 1974, 1975, 1982); 3× Yugoslav Cup winner (1981–1983); Croatian Sportsman of the Year (1980); 50 Greatest EuroLeague Contributors (2008); Croatian Lifetime Achievement in Sport (2002); FIBA Order of Merit (1994); FIBA's 50 Greatest Players (1991)	
2007	Teófilo Cruz	Puerto Rico	C	Olympic Order; FIBA's 50 Greatest Players (1991); 2× BSN champion (1962, 1968); 4× BSN MVP (1962, 1967, 1970, 1971); 4× BSN scoring champion (1960–1962, 1971); 6× BSN Defensive Player of the Year (1964, 1966, 1969–1972); No. 13 retired by Cangrejeros de Santurce	
2007	Dražen Dalipagić	Yugoslavia; Serbia	SF	Olympic Games gold medalist (1980); Olympic Games silver medalist (1976); Olympic Games bronze medalist (1984); 4× FIBA European Selection (1978, 1981 2×, 1982); 2× Yugoslav League champion (1976, 1979); Yugoslav Cup winner (1979); 2× FIBA Korać Cup champion (1978, 1979); 2× FIBA Korać Cup Finals Top Scorer (1974, 1978); Italian League Top Scorer (1988); FIBA EuroBasket MVP (1977); FIBA World Cup MVP (1978); The Best Athlete of Yugoslavia (1978); Yugoslav Sportsman of the Year (1978); 2× Mister Europa Player of the Year (1977, 1978); Euroscar Player of the Year (1980); FIBA's 50 Greatest Players (1991); 50 Greatest EuroLeague Contributors (2008); No. 3 retired by Brooklyn Nets; No. 10 retired by Cibona	
2007	Ivo Daneu	Yugoslavia; Slovenia	PG	Olympic Games silver medalist (1968); FIBA World Cup MVP (1967); FIBA European Selection (1967); 6× Yugoslav League champion (1957, 1959, 1961, 1962, 1966, 1970); Yugoslav Sportsperson of the Year (1967); Slovenian Sportsperson of the Year (1969); FIBA's 50 Greatest Players	
2007	Mirza Delibašić	Yugoslavia; Bosnia and Herzegovina	SG	Olympic Games gold medalist (1980); Olympic Games silver medalist (1976); 1979 EuroLeague Champion; 3× FIBA European Selection (1978, 1981 2×); FIBA's 50 Greatest Players (1991); Bosnia and Herzegovina Sportsman of the 20th century (2000); 50 Greatest EuroLeague Contributors (2008)	
2007	Oscar Furlong	Argentina	C	FIBA World Cup MVP (1950); 6× Buenos Aires League champion (1945–1948, 1951, 1954)	
2007	Nikos Galis	Greece; United States	SG	EuroBasket 1987 champion; 4× EuroBasket All-Tournament Team (1983, 1987, 1989, 1991); 4× EuroBasket Top Scorer (1983, 1987, 1989, 1991); 5× EuroLeague Top Scorer (1988–1990, 1994); FIBA World Cup Top Scorer (1986); EuroBasket MVP (1987)	
2007	Fernando Martín	Spain	C/PF	Olympic Games silver medalist (1984); FIBA Club World Cup champion (1981); 3× FIBA European Super Cup champion (1984, 1988, 1989); 2× FIBA Saporta Cup champion (1984, 1989); FIBA Korać Cup champion (1988); 4× Spanish League champion (1982 LEB, 1984–1986 ACB); Spanish Supercup winner (1984); 3× Spanish King's Cup winner (1985, 1986, 1989); FIBA's 50 Greatest Players (1991)	
2007	Pierluigi Marzorati	Italy	PG	Olympic Games silver medalist (1980); 2× FIBA Intercontinental Cup champion (1975, 1982); 2× EuroLeague champion (1982, 1983); 5× FIBA European Selection (1975, 1976, 1977, 1981, 1982); 4× FIBA Saporta Cup champion (1977, 1978, 1979, 1981); 4× FIBA Korać Cup champion (1973, 1974, 1975, 1991); 2× Italian League champion (1975, 1981); Mr. Europa (1976); FIBA's 50 Greatest Players (1991); Italian Basketball Hall of Fame (2007); EuroLeague 50 Greatest Contributors (2008)	
2007	Amaury Pasos	Brazil	PF	2x Olympic Games bronze medalist (1960, 1964); FIBA's 50 Greatest Players (1991); Brazil Former Athlete Olympic Prize (2003); FIBA World Cup MVP (1959); 2× South American Club Champion (1961, 1969); 2× Brazilian Champion (1966, 1969); 5× Paulista State Champion (1959, 1962, 1966, 1968, 1969)	
2007	Dražen Petrović	Yugoslavia; Croatia	SG/PG	2× Olympic Games silver medalist (1988, 1992); Olympic Games bronze medalist (1984); All-NBA Third Team (1993); 2× EuroLeague champion (1985, 1986); EuroLeague Finals Top Scorer (1985); FIBA European Selection (1987); 4× Euroscar (1986, 1989, 1992, 1993); 2× Mr. Europa Award (1986, 1993); 2× FIBA Saporta Cup champion (1987, 1989); 2× FIBA Saporta Cup Finals Top Scorer (1987, 1989); FIBA Korać Cup Finals Top Scorer (1988); Spanish League Top Scorer (1989); Spanish Cup winner (1989); Spanish Cup Final Top Scorer (1989); Yugoslav League champion (1985); 3× Yugoslav Cup winner (1985, 1986, 1988); FIBA World Championship MVP (1986); FIBA EuroBasket MVP (1989); Best Athlete of Yugoslavia (1985); Yugoslav Sportsman of the Year (1985); Croatian Sportsman of the Year (1985, 1986); FIBA's 50 Greatest Players (1991); Olympic Order (1993); 50 Greatest EuroLeague Contributors (2008)	
2009	Bira Maciel	Brazil	PF/C	Olympic Games bronze medalist (1964); 2× South American Club Champion (1964, 1969); 5× Brazilian Champion (1965, 1966, 1969, 1977, 1981); 8× São Paulo State champion (1964–1966, 1968, 1969, 1974, 1980, 1981); FIBA's 50 Greatest Players (1991); FIBA Order of Merit (1994)	
2009	Ricardo González	Argentina	SG	2× Argentine Federation League champion (1947, 1949); Konex Merit Diploma (1980)	
2009	Oscar Robertson	United States	PG	Olympic Games gold medal (1960); NBA champion (1971); NBA Most Valuable Player (1964); 12× NBA All-Star (1961–1972); 3× NBA All-Star Game MVP (1961, 1964, 1969); 9× All-NBA First Team (1961–1969); 2× All-NBA Second Team (1970, 1971); NBA Rookie of the Year (1961); NBA 35th Anniversary Team; NBA 50th Anniversary Team; NBA 75th Anniversary Team; No. 14 retired by Sacramento Kings; No. 1 retired by Milwaukee Bucks; 3× National college player of the year (1958–1960); 3× Consensus first-team All-American (1958–1960); 3× NCAA scoring champion (1958–1960); 3× First-team All-MVC (1958–1960); No. 12 retired by Cincinnati Bearcats; Mr. Basketball USA (1956); Arthur Ashe Courage Award (2025)	
2010	Dragan Kićanović	Yugoslavia; Serbia	SG	Olympic Games gold medal (1980); Olympic Games silver medal (1976); FIBA World Cup champion (1978); 3× EuroBasket (1973, 1975, 1977); EuroBasket All-Tournament Team (1979, 1981); 2× Korać Cup champion (1978–1979); Best Basketball Player of Yugoslavia in the 20th Century; FIBA World Cup MVP (1974); 2× Mr. Europa (1981, 1982); 2× Euroscar (1981, 1982); Best Athlete of Yugoslavia (1982); FIBA's 50 Greatest Players (1991); 3× FIBA European Selection (1976, 1978, 1981); FIBA Saporta Cup champion (1983); 3× Yugoslav League champion (1976, 1979, 1981); Yugoslav Cup winner (1979)	
2010	Vlade Divac	Yugoslavia; Serbia	C	NBA All-Star (2001); NBA All-Rookie First Team (1990); No. 21 retired by Sacramento Kings; J. Walter Kennedy Citizenship Award (2000); 2× FIBA World Cup champion (1990, 2002); 2× Olympic Games silver medalist (1988, 1996); 3× EuroBasket champion (1989, 1991, 1995); FIBA World Cup All-Tournament Team (1990); 2× EuroBasket All-Tournament Team (1991, 1995); Yugoslav League champion (1987); Yugoslav Cup champion (1989); FIBA Korać Cup champion (1989); Mister Europa Player of the Year (1989); FIBA's 50 Greatest Players (1991); FIBA All-Time EuroStars Team (2007); 50 Greatest EuroLeague Contributors (2008); Olympic Order (2016)	
2010	Dino Meneghin	Italy	C	Olympic Games silver medalist (1980); 4× FIBA Intercontinental Cup champion (1967, 1970, 1973, 1987); 7× EuroLeague champion (1970, 1972, 1973, 1975, 1976, 1987, 1988); EuroLeague Finals Top Scorer (1974); 3× FIBA European Selection (1975, 1978, 1980); 2× Mister Europa (1980, 1983); Euroscar (1983); 2× FIBA Saporta Cup champion (1967, 1980); FIBA Korać Cup champion (1985); 12× Italian League champion (1969–1971, 1973, 1974, 1977, 1978, 1982, 1985–1987, 1989); 6× Italian Cup winner (1969–1971, 1973, 1986, 1987); FIBA's 50 Greatest Players (1991); Italian Basketball Hall of Fame (2006); 50 Greatest EuroLeague Contributors (2008)	
2010	Arvydas Sabonis	Soviet Union; Lithuania	C	Olympic Games gold medal (1988); 2× Olympic Games bronze medal (1992, 1996); FIBA Club World Cup champion (1986); FIBA European League champion (1995); 3× USSR League champion (1985–1987); 2× ACB League champion (1993, 1994); LKL champion (2004); Spanish Cup winner (1993); FIBA's 50 Greatest Players (1991); 50 Greatest EuroLeague Contributors (2008); 6× Euroscar Player of the Year (1984, 1985, 1988, 1995, 1997, 1999); 2× Mr. Europa Player of the Year (1985, 1997); 4× Lithuanian Sportsman of the Year (1984–1986, 1996); EuroBasket MVP (1985); FIBA European League Final Four MVP (1995); EuroLeague Group Stage MVP (2004); EuroLeague Top 16 Stage MVP (2004); All-EuroLeague First Team (2004); 2× Spanish League Finals MVP (1993, 1994); 2× Spanish League MVP (1994, 1995); 2× Spanish All-Star Game MVP (1991, 1992); 2× EuroLeague Finals Top Scorer (1986, 1995); NBA All-Rookie First Team (1996)	
2010	Oscar Schmidt	Brazil	SG/SF	FIBA Intercontinental Cup champion (1979); FIBA Intercontinental Cup Finals Top Scorer (1979); FIBA's 50 Greatest Players (1991); FIBA European Selection (1991); Spanish League Top Scorer (1994); 2× Spanish League All-Star (1993, 1994); Spanish League All-Star Game 3 Point Contest Champion (1993); Italian Basketball Hall of Fame (2017); 7× Italian League Top Scorer (1984–1987, 1989, 1990, 1992); Italian Cup winner (1988); 10× Italian League All-Star (1983–1992); Italian League All-Star Game MVP (1987); 3× Italian League All-Star Game 3 Point Contest Champion (1987–1989); 2× Italian 2nd Division Top Scorer (1991, 1993); South American Club Championship champion (1979); 3× Brazilian Championship champion (1977, 1979, 1996); 10× Brazilian Championship Top Scorer (1979, 1980, 1996–2003); Olympic Order (1997)	
2013	David Robinson	United States	C	2× Olympic Games gold medal (1992, 1996); Olympic Games bronze medal (1988; FIBA World Cup champion (1986); 2× NBA champion (1999, 2003); NBA Most Valuable Player (1995); 10× NBA All-Star (1990–1996, 1998, 2000, 2001); 4× All-NBA First Team (1991, 1992, 1995, 1996); 2× All-NBA Second Team (1994, 1998); 4× All-NBA Third Team (1990, 1993, 2000, 2001); NBA Defensive Player of the Year (1992); 4× NBA All-Defensive First Team (1991, 1992, 1995, 1996); 4× NBA All-Defensive Second Team (1990, 1993, 1994, 1998); NBA scoring champion (1994); NBA rebounding leader (1991); NBA blocks leader (1992); NBA Sportsmanship Award (2001); NBA Rookie of the Year (1990); NBA All-Rookie First Team (1990); NBA 50th Anniversary Team (1996); NBA 75th Anniversary Team (2021); No. 50 retired by San Antonio Spurs; Sports Illustrated Sportsman of the Year (2003); National college player of the year (1987); Consensus first-team All-American (1987); Consensus second-team All-American (1986); NCAA rebounding leader (1986); 2× NCAA blocks leader (1986, 1987); 3× CAA Player of the Year (1985–1987); 3× First-team All-CAA (1985–1987); 2× CAA tournament MVP (1986, 1987); CAA All-Defensive Team (1987); CAA Rookie of the Year (1984); CAA All-Rookie Team (1984); USA Basketball Male Athlete of the Year (1986)	
2013	Zoran Slavnić	Yugoslavia; Serbia	PG	Olympic Games gold medal (1980); FIBA World Cup champion (1978); 3× EuroBasket gold medalist (1973, 1975, 1977); FIBA Saporta Cup champion (1974); FIBA European Selection (1976); Spanish League champion (1978); 2× Yugoslavian League champion (1969, 1972); 3× Yugoslavian Cup winner (1971, 1973, 1975); FIBA's 50 Greatest Players (1991)	
2013	Andrew Gaze	Australia	SG	NBA champion (1999); 2× NBL champion (1993, 1997); 7× NBL MVP (1991, 1992, 1994–1998); 11× NBL All-Star (1988–1997, 2004); 2× NBL All-Star Game MVP (1989, 1992); 15× All-NBL First Team (1986–2000); All-NBL Second Team (2001); 8× NBL Most Efficient Player (1990–1997); NBL Rookie of the Year (1984); NBL 20th Anniversary Team (1998); NBL 25th Anniversary Team (2003); NBL 40th Anniversary Team (2018); 6× Gaze Medalist (1990, 1994–1996, 1998, 2000); FIBA's 50 Greatest Players (1991)	
2013	Jean-Jacques Conceição	Angola; Portugal	PF	Most Valuable African Player of All Time (2011); 10× Portuguese League champion (1989–1995, 2001–2003); 7× Portuguese Federation Cup winner (1992–1996, 2001, 2002); 6× Portuguese League Cup winner (1990, 1991, 1993–1996); 5× Portuguese Super Cup winner (1989, 1991, 1994, 1995, 2002); 5× Angolan League champion (1983, 1985–1988); 4× Angolan Cup winner (1985–1988)	
2015	Ruperto Herrera	Cuba	SG/SF	Olympic Games bronze medal (1972); Olympic Order (2019); FIBA Order of Merit (1999); 9× Cuban League champion (1964–1969, 1971, 1973, 1975)	
2015	Michael Jordan	United States	SG/SF	2× Olympic Games Gold Medalist (1984, 1992); 6× NBA champion (1991–1993, 1996–1998); 6× NBA Finals MVP (1991–1993, 1996–1998); 5× NBA Most Valuable Player (1988, 1991, 1992, 1996, 1998); 14× NBA All-Star (1985–1993, 1996–1998, 2002, 2003); 3× NBA All-Star Game MVP (1988, 1996, 1998); 10× All-NBA First Team (1987–1993, 1996–1998); All-NBA Second Team (1985); NBA Defensive Player of the Year (1988); 9× NBA All-Defensive First Team (1988–1993, 1996–1998); NBA Rookie of the Year (1985); NBA All-Rookie First Team (1985); 10× NBA scoring champion (1987–1993, 1996–1998); 3× NBA steals leader (1988, 1990, 1993); 2× NBA Slam Dunk Contest champion (1987, 1988); No. 23 retired by Chicago Bulls; No. 23 retired by Miami Heat; 3× AP Athlete of the Year (1991–1993); Sports Illustrated Sportsperson of the Year (1991); NBA 50th Anniversary Team (1996); NBA 75th Anniversary Team (2021); NCAA champion (1982); Consensus National college player of the year (1984); 2× Sporting News National Player of the Year (1983, 1984); 2× Consensus first-team All-American (1983, 1984); ACC Player of the Year (1984); ACC Athlete of the Year (1984); 2× First-team All-ACC (1983, 1984); ACC Rookie of the Year (1982); No. 23 retired by North Carolina Tar Heels; 3× USA Basketball Male Athlete of the Year (1983, 1984, 1992); McDonald's All-American (1981); First-team Parade All-American (1981); Presidential Medal of Freedom (2016)	
2015	Šarūnas Marčiulionis	Soviet Union; Lithuania	SG	Olympic Games gold medal (1988); 2× Olympic Games bronze medal (1992, 1996); 4× Lithuanian Sportsman of the Year (1987, 1989–1991); Mr. Europa (1988); FIBA's 50 Greatest Players (1991); FIBA EuroBasket MVP (1995); FIBA EuroBasket Top Scorer (1995)	
2015	Antoine Rigaudeau	France	PG/SG	Olympic Games silver medal (2000); 2× EuroLeague champion (1998, 2001); FIBA European Selection (1991); 4× FIBA EuroStar (1996–1999); 2× Italian League champion (1998, 2001); 3× Italian Cup winner (1999, 2001, 2002); French League champion (1996); 5× French League French Player's MVP (1991–1994, 1996); 3× French League Best Young Player (1990–1992); Glory of Sport (2017)	
2015	Vladimir Tkachenko	Soviet Union; Russia	C	2x Olympic Games bronze medal (1976, 1980); Euroscar (1979); Mr. Europa (1979); 2× FIBA European Selection (1979, 1982); 4× USSR League champion (1983, 1984, 1988, 1990); Master of Sports of the USSR (1979); Order of the Badge of Honour (USSR) (1985)	
2016	Panagiotis Fasoulas	Greece	C	EuroBasket 1987 champion; EuroBasket All-Tournament Team (1987)	
2016	Hakeem Olajuwon	Nigeria; United States	C	1x Olympic Games Gold Medalist (1996); 2× NBA champion (1994, 1995); 2× NBA Finals MVP (1994, 1995); NBA Most Valuable Player (1994); 12× NBA All-Star (1985–1990, 1992–1997); 6× All-NBA First Team (1987–1989, 1993, 1994, 1997); 3× All-NBA Second Team (1986, 1990, 1996); 3× All-NBA Third Team (1991, 1995, 1999); 2× NBA Defensive Player of the Year (1993, 1994); 5× NBA All-Defensive First Team (1987, 1988, 1990, 1993, 1994); 4× NBA All-Defensive Second Team (1985, 1991, 1996, 1997); NBA All-Rookie First Team (1985); 2× NBA rebounding leader (1989, 1990); 3× NBA blocks leader (1990, 1991, 1993); No. 34 retired by Houston Rockets; NBA 50th Anniversary Team (1996); NBA 75th Anniversary Team (2021); NCAA Final Four Most Outstanding Player (1983); Helms Foundation Player of the Year (1983); Consensus first-team All-American (1984); NCAA rebounding leader (1984); SWC Player of the Year (1984); First-team All-SWC (1984); Second-team All-SWC (1983); No. 34 retired by Houston Cougars	
2016	Juan Antonio San Epifanio	Spain	SF	Olympic Games silver medal (1984); FIBA Intercontinental Cup champion (1985); FIBA Intercontinental Cup MVP (1987); Mr. Europa (1984); EuroLeague Finals Top Scorer (1984); 3× FIBA European Selection (1980, 1982, 1991); 2× FIBA Saporta Cup champion (1985, 1986); FIBA Saporta Cup Finals Top Scorer (1981); FIBA Korać Cup champion (1987); 7× Spanish League champion (1981, 1983 LEB, 1987–1990, 1994 ACB); 10× Spanish Cup winner (1978–1983, 1987, 1988, 1991, 1994); 3× Spanish Cup Finals Top Scorer (1981, 1983, 1984); FIBA's 50 Greatest Players (1991); 50 Greatest EuroLeague Contributors (2008)	
2016	Manuel Raga	Mexico	SG	2× FIBA Intercontinental Cup champion (1970, 1973); 3× EuroLeague champion (1970, 1972, 1973); 50 Greatest EuroLeague Contributors (2008); 3× Italian League champion (1969–1971); 3× Italian Cup winner (1969–1971); 3× Swiss League champion (1975–1977); Swiss Cup winner (1975); Best Mexican Player of the 20th Century	
2017	Miki Berkovich	Israel	SG	FIBA Intercontinental Cup champion (1980); 2× EuroLeague champion (1977, 1981); 4× FIBA European All-Star (1978, 1981, 1982, 1987); 16× Israeli League champion (1972–1975, 1977–1988); 13× Israeli Cup winner (1972, 1973, 1975, 1977–1983, 1985, 1986, 1987); EuroBasket MVP (1979); FIBA's 50 Greatest Players (1991); Israel's Top Sportsmen of the 50 Year Jubilee (1948–1998); 50 Greatest EuroLeague Contributors (2008)	
2017	Pero Cameron	New Zealand	PF/C	9× NZNBL champion (1995–1997, 1999–2002, 2008, 2009); NZNBL Rookie of the Year (1992); British League champion (2002)	
2017	Valdis Valters	Soviet Union; Latvia	PG	EuroBasket MVP (1981); 9× Latvian League champion (1974, 1979, 1982, 1984–1986, 1992, 1993, 1996)	
2017	Toni Kukoč	Yugoslavia; Croatia	SF/PF	2x Olympic Games silver medal (1988, 1992); 3× NBA champion (1996–1998); NBA Sixth Man of the Year (1996); NBA All-Rookie Second Team (1994); FIBA World Championship MVP (1990); FIBA EuroBasket MVP (1991); FIBA's 50 Greatest Players (1991); 5× Euroscar Player of the Year (1990, 1991, 1994, 1996, 1998); 4× Mister Europa Player of the Year (1990–1992, 1996); 3× EuroLeague champion (1989–1991); 3× EuroLeague Final Four MVP (1990, 1991, 1993); EuroLeague Finals Top Scorer (1990); FIBA European Selection (1991); 50 Greatest EuroLeague Contributors (2008); Italian League champion (1992); Italian Cup winner (1993); 4× Yugoslav League champion (1988–1991); 2× Yugoslav Cup winner (1990, 1991); 3× Croatian Sportsman of the Year (1989–1991); Franjo Bučar State Award for Sport (1992); FIBA Under-19 World Cup MVP (1987)	
2017	Shaquille O'Neal	United States	C	1x Olympic Games Gold Medalist (1996); 4× NBA champion (2000–2002, 2006); 3× NBA Finals MVP (2000–2002); NBA Most Valuable Player (2000); 15× NBA All-Star (1993–1998, 2000–2007, 2009); 3× NBA All-Star Game MVP (2000, 2004, 2009); 8× All-NBA First Team (1998, 2000–2006); 2× All-NBA Second Team (1995, 1999); 4× All-NBA Third Team (1994, 1996, 1997, 2009); 3× NBA All-Defensive Second Team (2000, 2001, 2003); NBA Rookie of the Year (1993); NBA All-Rookie First Team (1993); NBA 50th Anniversary Team; NBA 75th Anniversary Team; No. 34 retired by Los Angeles Lakers; No. 32 retired by Miami Heat; No. 32 retired by Orlando Magic; Associated Press Player of the Year (1991); UPI Player of the Year (1991); Adolph Rupp Trophy (1991); 2× Consensus first-team All-American (1991, 1992); NCAA rebounding leader (1991); NCAA blocks leader (1992); 2× SEC Male Athlete of the Year (1991, 1992); 2× SEC Player of the Year (1991, 1992); 3× First-team All-SEC (1990, 1991, 1992); No. 33 retired by LSU Tigers; FIBA World Championship MVP (1994); USA Basketball Male Athlete of the Year (1994); McDonald's All-American Game Co-MVP (1989); First-team Parade All-American (1989); Texas Mr. Basketball (1989)	
2019	Atanas Golomeev	Bulgaria	C	FIBA's 50 Greatest Players (1991); 2× FIBA EuroBasket Top Scorer (1973, 1975); FIBA European Selection (1977); 10× Bulgarian League champion (1967, 1968, 1970–1973, 1978, 1979, 1981, 1982); 4× Bulgarian Cup winner (1976, 1979, 1982, 1983)	
2019	Alonzo Mourning	United States	C	NBA champion (2006); 7× NBA All-Star (1994–1997, 2000–2002); 2× All-NBA Team (1999, 2000); 2× NBA Defensive Player of the Year (1999, 2000); 2× NBA blocks leader (1999, 2000); NBA All-Rookie First Team (1993); No. 33 retired by Miami Heat; Consensus first-team All-American (1992); Consensus second-team All-American (1990); Third-team All-American – NABC (1991); Big East Player of the Year (1992); 2× First-team All-Big East (1990, 1992); 3× Big East Defensive Player of the Year (1989, 1990, 1992); NCAA blocks leader (1989); 2× USA Basketball Male Athlete of the Year (1990, 2000); McDonald's All-American Game Co-MVP (1988); 2× First-team Parade All-American (1987, 1988); Second-team Parade All-American (1986); 2× Virginia Mr. Basketball (1987, 1988); Summer Olympics Gold Medalist (2000); 2× FIBA World Cup Medalist (1990 bronze, 1994 gold); Goodwill Games Silver Medalist (1990)	
2019	Fabricio Oberto	Argentina	C	NBA champion (2007); FIBA South American League MVP (1998); Argentine League MVP (1998); Argentine League Finals MVP (1998); 2× Summer Olympics medalist (2004 gold, 2008 bronze); FIBA World Cup medalist (2002); 4× FIBA AmeriCup medalist (1995, 2001, 2003, 2011)	
2019	José Ortiz	Puerto Rico	C	FIBA Korać Cup champion (1997); 8× Puerto Rican League champion (1985, 1991, 1994, 1998–2001, 2003); Puerto Rican League MVP (2002); Venezuelan League champion (1997); 2× FIBA AmeriCup medalist (1995, 2003)	
2019	Mohsen Medhat Warda	Egypt	C	2x Arab Nations Championship gold medalist (1974, 1987); 2x African Championship gold medalist (1975, 1983); Participated in 2 Olympic Games (1976, 1984); 2x African Championship bronze medalist (1978, 1985); 1x Mediterranean Games bronze medalist (1979); 2x African Championship silver medalist (1981, 1987); African Basketball Player of the Year (1984); 8x Egyptian Player of the Year	
2019	Jiří Zídek Sr.	Czechoslovakia	C	2× FIBA European Selection (1966, 1967); 2× EuroBasket medalist (1967, 1969); EuroLeague Finals Top Scorer (1966); FIBA Saporta Cup Finals Top Scorer (1968); 2× Czechoslovak Player of the Year (1970, 1972); Best Czechoslovak Player of 20th Century (2001); Czechoslovak League all-time leading scorer	
2020	Mieczysław Łopatka	Poland	SF	FIBA European Selection (1969); 3× EuroBasket medalist (1963, 1965, 1967)	
2020	Steve Nash	Canada	PG	2× NBA Most Valuable Player (2005, 2006); 8× NBA All-Star (2002, 2003, 2005–2008, 2010, 2012); 3× All-NBA First Team (2005–2007); 2× All-NBA Second Team (2008, 2010); 2× All-NBA Third Team (2002, 2003); 5× NBA assists leader (2005–2007, 2010, 2011); No. 13 retired by Phoenix Suns; J. Walter Kennedy Citizenship Award (2007); 2× FIBA AmeriCup MVP (1999, 2003); Lou Marsh Trophy (2005); 3× Lionel Conacher Award (2002, 2005, 2006); NBA 75th Anniversary Team; 2× WCC Player of the Year (1995, 1996); 2× First-team All-WCC (1995, 1996); No. 11 retired by Santa Clara Broncos	
2020	Modestas Paulauskas	Soviet Union; Lithuania	SF	Olympic Games gold medal (1972); Olympic Games bronze medal (1968); 3x FIBA European Selection (1969, 1971, 1972); 4× EuroBasket champion (1965, 1967, 1969, 1971); 2x FIBA World Cup champion (1967, 1974); FIBA World Cup medalist (1970); EuroBasket medalist (1973); FIBA's 50 Greatest Players (1991)	
2020	Kenichi Sako	Japan	PG	12× Emperor's Cup winner (1993, 1995, 1997, 1998, 2000, 2002–2004, 2007–2010); 9× JBL champion (1995–1998, 2000, 2002, 2003, 2007, 2008); 3× JBL MVP (1995, 1996, 2000); 9× JBL Best Five (1995–2003); 2× JBL 3point field goals leader (1997, 2001); 2× JBL assists leader (1993, 1994); Japanese Inter High School champion (1998)	
2020	Sasha Volkov	Soviet Union; Ukraine	PF/C	Olympic Games gold medal (1988); FIBA World Cup medalist (1986, 1990); FIBA's 50 Greatest Players (1991)	
2020	Jure Zdovc	Yugoslavia; Slovenia	PG	FIBA World Cup champion (1990); Olympic Games silver medal (1988); 2× EuroBasket champion (1989, 1991)	
2021	Mathieu Faye	Senegal	PG	FIBA Korać Cup champion (1983); French League champion (1983); French Cup champion (1983)	
2021	Panagiotis Giannakis	Greece	PG/SG	EuroLeague champion (1996); 1× EuroBasket champion (1987); 1× EuroBasket silver medalist (1989); FIBA Saporta Cup champion (1993); 4× FIBA European Selection (1980, 1987, 1990, 1991 I); 50 Greatest EuroLeague Contributors (2008); 101 Greats of European Basketball (2018); 7× Greek League champion (1985–1991); 7× Greek Cup winner (1985, 1987–1990, 1992, 1996); Greek League Top Scorer (1980); Greek League Assist leader (1989); 2× Greek Cup Finals Top Scorer (1985, 1988); 4× Greek League All-Star (1991, 1994 I, 1994 II, 1996 I); Greek League Hall of Fame (2022); Greek 2nd Division champion (1975)	
2021	Stanislav Kropilák	Czechoslovakia	F/C	FIBA's 50 Greatest Players (1991); 4× FIBA European Selection (1981 2×, 1982, 1987); 5× Czechoslovak League champion (1979, 1980, 1983–1985); 5× Czechoslovak Player of the Year (1979, 1980, 1982, 1983, 1985); 10× Czechoslovak League All-Star Five (1976–1985); 10× Slovak Player of the Year (1975–1984); Best Slovak Player of the 20th Century (2000)	
2021	Oscar Moglia	Uruguay	SF	Olympic Games bronze medal (1956); Summer Olympic Games Top Scorer (1956); 5× Uruguayan Federal Champion (1953, 1956, 1957, 1966, 1967); 8× Uruguayan Federal Championship Top Scorer (1953–1960)	
2021	Detlef Schrempf	Germany	SF/PF	3× NBA All-Star (1993, 1995, 1997); All-NBA Third Team (1995); 2× NBA Sixth Man of the Year (1991, 1992); German Player of the Year (1992)	
2021	Sergei Tarakanov	Soviet Union; Russia	SF/PF	Olympic Games gold medal (1988); Olympic Games bronze medal (1980); FIBA World Cup champion (1982); 5× EuroBasket medalist (1979, 1981, 1983, 1985, 1987); 7× Soviet League champion (1980–1984, 1988, 1990); 2× Soviet Cup winner (1978, 1982); Master of Sports of the USSR, international class (1981); Honored Master of Sports of the USSR (1981); Order of Friendship of Peoples (1988); Medal "For Distinguished Labour" (1988); Order of Honour (Russia) (2006)	
2023	Ângelo Victoriano	Angola	C	11× Angolan League champion (1989, 1990, 1992, 1996, 1997, 2000–2005); 7× Angolan Cup winner (1990, 1991, 1997, 2002, 2003, 2005, 2006); 6× Angolan Supercup winner (1997, 2001–2005)	
2023	Sony Hendrawan	Indonesia	SF	IBL Legacy Award (2020); Indonesian League champion (1969); 2× pre-Olympic Top Scorer (1968, 1964); ABC Championship Most Valuable Player (1967); ABC Championship All-Star 5 (1967); ABC Championship Top Scorer (1967)	
2023	Wlamir Marques	Brazil	SF	2× Olympic Games bronze medalist (1960, 1964); FIBA's 50 Greatest Players (1991); FIBA World Cup MVP (1963); FIBA Intercontinental Test Cup champion (1965); Best Athlete of South America (1961); 2× South American Club Champion (1964, 1969); 3× Brazilian Champion (1965, 1966, 1969); 7× São Paulo State Champion (1957, 1960, 1964–1966, 1968, 1969)	
2023	Zurab Sakandelidze	Soviet Union; Georgia	PG/SG	Olympic Games gold medal (1972); Olympic Games bronze medal (1968)	
2023	Caloy Loyzaga	Philippines	C	1x FIBA World Cup bronze medal (1954); 2x FIBA Asia Cup gold medal (1960, 1963); 4x Asian Games gold medal (1951, 1954, 1958, 1962); FIBA World Cup All-Tournament Team (1954); FIBA Asia Cup All-Tournament Team (1960)	
2023	Yao Ming	China	C	8× NBA All-Star (2003–2009, 2011); 2× All-NBA Second Team (2007, 2009); 3× All-NBA Third Team (2004, 2006, 2008); NBA All-Rookie First Team (2003); No. 11 retired by Houston Rockets; CBA MVP (2001); CBA champion (2002); CBA Finals MVP (2001); 3× CBA rebounding leader (2000–2002); 3× CBA blocks leader (2000–2002); 3× FIBA Asia Cup MVP (2001, 2003, 2005)	
2024	Reggie Miller	United States	SG	Olympic Games gold medal (1996); 5× NBA All-Star (1990, 1995, 1996, 1998, 2000); 3× All-NBA Third Team (1995, 1996, 1998); NBA 75th Anniversary Team (2021); No. 31 retired by Indiana Pacers; USA Basketball Male Athlete of the Year (2002)	
2024	Kirk Penney	New Zealand	SG	NBL champion (2011); NBL Most Valuable Player (2009); 4× All-NBL First Team (2008–2011); All-NBL Second Team (2016); 3× NBL scoring champion (2009–2011); NZNBL Most Outstanding Kiwi Guard (1999); NZNBL Rookie of the Year (1998); 2× TBL All-Star (2013, 2014); 2× TBL Three-Point Shootout champion (2013, 2014); Lithuanian LKL champion (2007); Lithuanian LKF Cup winner (2007); Baltic League All-Star (2007); Israeli League champion (2006); Israeli Basketball State Cup winner (2006); NBA D-League champion (2005); AP honorable mention All-American (2003); 2× First-team All-Big Ten (2002, 2003)	
2024	Romain Sato	Central African Republic	SG	EuroLeague champion (2011); EuroCup champion (2014); Liga ACB champion (2017); All-Liga ACB First Team (2014); Spanish Supercup winner (2017); 4× LBA champion (2007–2010); 2× Italian Cup winner (2009, 2010); 3× Italian Supercup winner (2007–2009); LBA MVP (2010); Italian SuperCup MVP (2009); Greek League champion (2011); Greek Cup winner (2012); Turkish Cup winner (2013); 2× First-team All-Atlantic 10 (2003, 2004)	
2024	Pedja Stojakovic	Serbia	SF	NBA champion (2011); 3× NBA All-Star (2002–2004); All-NBA Second Team (2004); 2× NBA Three-Point Contest champion (2002, 2003); No. 16 retired by Sacramento Kings; FIBA EuroBasket MVP (2001); FIBA EuroLeague Top Scorer (1998); FIBA EuroStar (2007); Greek Cup winner (1995); Greek League MVP (1998); 2× Greek League All-Star (1996 II, 1997); Greek League Hall of Fame (2022); 2× Mister Europa Player of the Year (2001, 2002); Euroscar Player of the Year (2001)	
2025	Alphonse Bilé	Ivory Coast	PG	5x Côte d’Ivoire League champion (1973-1976, 1978); West Africa University Games Silver Medallist (1975); West Africa University Games Gold Medallist (1981); West African Games Gold Medallist (1977); All-Africa Summer Games Silver Medallist (1978); 2x FIBA Afrobasket Silver Medallist (1977, 1980); FIBA Afrobasket Gold Medallist (1981); Played 12 consecutive years for the National Team (1971 - 1982); Played in 1 World University Games (1979); Played in 1 FIBA World Cup (1982); National Team Captain (1976-1982); African Selection Captain (1982); Chevalier de l’Ordre National Madagascar (2009); Commandeur Mérite Sportif Côte d’Ivoire; Chevalier de l`Ordre national de la République du Mali (2011)	
2025	Andrew Bogut	Australia	C	NBA Champion (2015); All-NBA Third Team (2010); NBA All-Defensive Second Team (2015); NBA All-Rookie First Team (2006); NBA blocks leader (2011); NBL Most Valuable Player (2019); All-NBL First Team (2019); All-NBL Second Team (2020); NBL Best Defensive Player (2019); Gaze Medal winner (2016); National college player of the year (2005); Consensus first-team All-American (2005); Pete Newell Big Man Award (2005); MWC Player of the Year (2005); MWC Freshman of the Year (2004); No. 4 retired by Utah Utes; FIBA Under-19 World Cup MVP (2003)	
2025	Pau Gasol	Spain	PF/C	2x NBA champion (2009, 2010); 6x NBA All-Star (2006, 2009-2011, 2015, 2016); 2× All-NBA Second Team (2010, 2014); 2× All-NBA Third Team (2008, 2009); NBA Rookie of the Year (2002); NBA All-Rookie First Team (2002); No. 16 retired by Los Angeles Lakers; All-EuroLeague Second Team (2001); 3× Liga ACB champion (1999, 2001, 2021); Spanish King's Cup winner (2001); Spanish King's Cup MVP (2001); ACB Finals MVP (2001); 2× FIBA Europe Player of the Year (2008, 2009); 2× Mister Europa Player of the Year (2004, 2009); 4× Euroscar Player of the Year (2008–2010, 2015); Spanish Sportsman of the Year (2011); FIBA World Cup MVP (2006); 2× FIBA EuroBasket MVP (2009, 2015); FIBA EuroBasket Dream Team (2020); 2x Olympic Games Silver Medalist (2008, 2012); 1x Olympic Games Bronze Medalist (2016)	
2025	Ratko Radovanovic	Yugoslavia	C	1x Olympic Games Gold Medalist (1980); 1x Olympic Games Bronze Medalist (1984); EuroLeague champion (1979); FIBA European Selection (1979); 3× Yugoslav League champion (1978, 1980, 1983); Yugoslav Cup winner (1978)	
2026	Dirk Nowitzki	Germany	PF	NBA champion (2011); NBA Finals MVP (2011); NBA Most Valuable Player (2007); 14× NBA All-Star (2002–2012, 2014, 2015, 2019); 4× All-NBA First Team (2005–2007, 2009); 5× All-NBA Second Team (2002, 2003, 2008, 2010, 2011); 3× All-NBA Third Team (2001, 2004, 2012); NBA Three-Point Contest champion (2006); NBA 75th Anniversary Team; No. 41 retired by Dallas Mavericks; German Bundesliga MVP (1999); German Bundesliga Top Scorer (1999); FIBA World Cup MVP (2002); FIBA Basketball World Cup Top Scorer; FIBA EuroBasket MVP (2005); 2× FIBA EuroBasket Top Scorer; FIBA EuroBasket Dream Team (2020); 6× Euroscar Player of the Year (2002–2006, 2011); 2× FIBA Europe Men's Player of the Year (2005, 2011); Mister Europa Player of the Year (2005); Silbernes Lorbeerblatt (2011); German Sports Personality of the Year (2011); Laureus Lifetime Achievement Award (2020); No. 14 retired by Germany national team	
2026	Hedo Türkoğlu	Turkey	PF/SF	NBA Most Improved Player (2008); NBA All-Rookie Second Team (2001); Turkish League champion (1997); 2× Turkish Cup champion (1997, 1998); 2× Turkish Presidential Cup champion (1998, 2000)	
2026	Wang Zhizhi	China	C	CBA MVP (2000); 7× CBA champion (1996–2001, 2007); 2× CBA Finals MVP (2000, 2007); 4× CBA blocks leader (1996–1999); 2× CBA Slam Dunk leader (1996, 1998); 4x FIBA Asia Cup gold medalist (1995, 1999, 2001, 2011); 3x Asian Games gold medalist (1998, 2006, 2010)	

=== Male teams ===
Class of 2017
United States Men's Dream Team at the 1992 Barcelona Summer Olympic Games - Gold
Starters
PG #15 Magic Johnson	SG #9 Michael Jordan	SF #7 Larry Bird	PF #14 Charles Barkley	C #6 Patrick Ewing
Bench
PG #12 John Stockton	SG #10 Clyde Drexler	SF #8 Scottie Pippen; SF #13 Chris Mullin	PF #11 Karl Malone; PF #4 Christian Laettner	C #5 David Robinson
Coaches
Head coach Chuck Daly	Assistant coach Mike Krzyzewski	Assistant coach Lenny Wilkens	Assistant coach P. J. Carlesimo	

=== Female players ===
In total, 40 women have been inducted.

Year	Inductee	Nationality	Pos.	Achievements	Ref.
2007	Liliana Ronchetti	Italy	SG	4x Italian League Champion (1950-1953); 3x Swiss League Champion (1967-1969); 4x Top-scorer of the Italian League (1952-1954, 1960); Scored 51 points in a game with Società Ginnastica Comense, which represents an all-time scoring record for a woman in a game of the Italian League	
2007	Vanya Voynova	Bulgaria	C	2x World Cup medalist (1959, 1964); 4x EuroBasket medalist (1954, 1958, 1960, 1964)	
2007	Uljana Semjonova	Soviet Union; Latvia	C	Order of the Red Banner of Labour (1976); 2× Summer Olympics medalist (1976, 1980)	
2007	Hortência Marcari	Brazil	SG	Summer Olympics medalist (1996); World Cup medalist (1994); 3× Pan American Games medalist (1983, 1987, 1991)	
2007	Ann Meyers	United States	SG	Summer Olympics Silver Medalist (1976); World Cup Gold Medalist (1979); 2x Pan American Games Medalist (1975 gold, 1979 silver); WBL Co-MVP (1980); Broderick Cup (1978); Honda Sports Award for basketball (1978); 4× Kodak All-American (1975–1978)	
2009	Jacky Chazalon	France	PG	EuroBasket medalist (1970); Glory of Sport (2003)	
2010	Cheryl Miller	United States	SF/PF	Summer Olympics Gold Medalist (1984); 2x World Cup medalist (1983 silver, 1986 gold); Pan American Games Gold Medalist (1983); 2× NCAA champion (1983, 1984); 2× NCAA Tournament MOP (1983, 1984); 3× Naismith Player of the Year (1984–1986); Wade Trophy (1985); 2× Honda Sports Award (1984, 1985); 2× USA Basketball Female Athlete of the Year (1984, 1986); Broderick Cup (1984); 2× WBCA Player of the Year (1985, 1986); 4× Kodak All-American (1983–1986); No. 31 retired by USC Trojans	
2010	Natalya Zasulskaya	Soviet Union; Russia	PF	2× Summer Olympics medalist (1988 bronze, 1992 gold)	
2013	Teresa Edwards	United States	SG	5× Summer Olympics medalist (1984 gold, 1988 gold, 1992 bronze, 1996 gold, 2000 gold); 3x World Cup medalist (1986 gold, 1990 gold, 1994 bronze); 2× Pan American Games medalist (1987, 1991); 4× USA Basketball Female Athlete of the Year (1987, 1990, 1996, 2000); 2× Kodak All-American (1985, 1986); SEC Tournament MVP (1983)	
2013	Paula Gonçalves	Brazil	PG	Summer Olympics silver medalist (1996); World Cup medalist (1994); 3× Pan American Games medalist (1983, 1987, 1991)	
2015	Anne Donovan	United States	C	2× Summer Olympics Gold Medalist (1984, 1988); 2× Pan American Games medalist (1983 gold, 1987 gold); Naismith College Player of the Year (1983); Honda Sports Award (1983); WBCA Player of the Year (1983); 2× Kodak All-American (1981, 1983)	
2016	Michele Timms	Australia	PG	2× Summer Olympics medalist (1996 bronze, 2000 silver); World Cup medalist (1998); WNBA All-Star (1999); 5× WNBL champion (1986–1989, 1992); FIBA Women's European Champions Cup winner (1996); No. 7 retired by Phoenix Mercury	
2017	Razija Mujanović	Yugoslavia; Bosnia and Herzegovina	C	Summer Olympics silver medalist (1988); World Cup silver medalist (1990); 3× Euroscar European Player of the Year (1991, 1994, 1995)	
2019	Janeth Arcain	Brazil	SG	4× WNBA Champion (1997–2000); WNBA All-Star (2001); All-WNBA First Team (2001); WNBA Most Improved Player Award (2001); 2× Summer Olympics medalist (1996 silver, 2000 bronze); World Cup gold medalist (1994); 3× Pan American Games medalist (1987 silver, 1991 gold, 2007 silver)	
2019	Margo Dydek	Poland	C	2× WNBA All-Star (2003, 2006); WNBA all-time blocks leader; EuroBasket medalist (1999); La Gazzetta dello Sport's European Female Basketball Player of the Year (1999); Poland's Sports Woman of the Year; Polish League Finals MVP (2000); Polish Cross of Merit (1999)	
2020	Isabelle Fijalkowski	France	PF	EuroBasket champion (2001); 2x EuroBasket medalist (1993, 1999)	
2020	Ágnes Németh	Hungary	C	2x Hungarian League champion (1985, 1988); Ronchetti Cup winner (1983); 3x best Hungarian player; EuroBasket Junior silver medalist (1979); Played in one Olympic Games (1980); Played in one FIBA World Championship (1986); Played in 8 EuroBaskets (1980, 1981, 1983, 1985, 1987, 1989, 1991, 1997); 4x EuroBasket bronze medalist (1983, 1985, 1987, 1991); Best European player (1985); 2x European Selection; Record of 367 games with the Hungarian national team	
2020	Shin-Ja Park	South Korea	C	5x East Asian Clubs League champion (1963 - 1967); Played in 2 FIBA World Championships (1964, 1967); Asian Championship bronze medalist (1965); FIBA World Championship silver medalist (1967); FIBA World Championships MVP (1967); Recognized as the single most outstanding player in Asia for a period of 12 years	
2021	Hana Horáková	Czech Republic	SG	FIBA Europe Women's Player of the Year (2010); FIBA World Championship MVP (2010); 2x European Championships medalist (2003 silver, 2005 gold)	
2021	Penka Stoyanova	Bulgaria	C	2× Summer Olympics medalist (1976 bronze, 1980 silver); 3× Bulgarian Women's Basketball League champion (1971, 1973, 1974); 8× Bulgarian Women's Basketball Cup champion (1974, 1976, 1977, 1980, 1983, 1985–1987)	
2021	Zheng Haixia	China	C	2× Summer Olympics medalist (1984 bronze, 1992 silver)	
2022	Lisa Leslie	United States	C	4x Summer Olympics Gold Medalist (1996, 2000, 2004, 2008); 3x World Cup medalist (1994 bronze, 1998 gold, 2002 gold); 3x WNBA MVP (2001, 2004, 2006); 2x WNBA champion (2001, 2002); 2x WNBA Finals MVP (2001, 2002); 8× WNBA All-Star (1999–2003, 2005, 2006, 2009); 3× WNBA All-Star Game MVP (1999, 2001, 2002); 8× All-WNBA First Team (1997, 2000–2004, 2006, 2008); 4× All-WNBA Second Team (1998, 1999, 2005, 2009); 2× WNBA Defensive Player of the Year (2004, 2008); 2× WNBA All-Defensive First Team (2006, 2008); 2× WNBA All-Defensive Second Team (2005, 2009); 2× WNBA blocks leader (2004, 2008); 3× WNBA rebounding champion (1997, 1998), 2004); WNBA Peak Performer (2004); WNBA 10th Anniversary Team (2006); WNBA 15th Anniversary Team (2011); WNBA 20th Anniversary Team (2016); WNBA 25th Anniversary Team (2021); No. 9 retired by Los Angeles Sparks; No. 33 retired by USC; FIBA World Championship MVP (2002); Honda Sports Award (1994); Naismith College Player of the Year (1994); USBWA National Player of the Year (1994); WBCA Player of the Year (1994); Kodak All-American (1994); 3× USA Basketball Female Athlete of the Year (1993, 1998, 2002); 2× All-American – USBWA (1993, 1994); 4× All Pac-10 (1991-1994); Naismith Prep Player of the Year (1990); Gatorade National Player of the Year (1990); First player to dunk in a WNBA Game (2002)	
2022	Robyn Maher	Australia	SG	10× WNBL champion (1983, 1984, 1986–1989, 1991–1993, 1997); Summer Olympics bronze medalist (1996)	
2022	Catarina Pollini	Italy	PF/C	WNBA Champion (1997); Ronchetti Cup Champion (1994); 7x European Champions Cup (1983, 1985-1988, 1991, 1995); 12x Italian League champion (1982-1988, 1990, 1995-1998); 1x EuroBasket Women Silver Medalist (1995)	
2022	Jurgita Štreimikytė-Virbickienė	Lithuania	SF	Euroleague Women champion (2009)	
2022	Mame Maty Mbengue	Senegal	C	4× FIBA AfroBasket Women MVP (1993, 1997, 1999, 2000)	
2023	Yuko Oga	Japan	PG	2x Japanese High School Champion; 2x National Sports Festival Champion; 2x Winter Cup Champion; 9x WJBL Champion; WJBL Regular Season MVP; 6x WJBL Best Five; 3x WJBL All-Star; 7x Empress Cup Champion; 8x Empress Cup Best Five; 2010 FIBA World Championship for Women Scoring Leader; Women's Chinese Basketball Association Champion; 2x Asian Games Bronze Medalist (2006, 2010); 5x FIBA Women's Asia Cup Medalist (2001 silver, 2007 bronze, 2009 bronze, 2011 bronze, 2013 gold)	
2023	Katrina McClain	United States	PF	3x Summer Olympics medalist (1988 gold, 1992 bronze, 1996 gold); 3x World Cup medalist (1986 gold, 1900 gold, 1994 bronze); 2× Pan American Games medalist (1987 gold, 1991 bronze); WBCA Player of the Year (1987); 2× Kodak All-American (1986, 1987); National Player of the Year (1987); 2× USA Basketball Female Athlete of the Year (1988, 1992); SEC Tournament MVP (1986); SEC Freshman of the Year (1984)	
2023	Amaya Valdemoro	Spain	SF	EuroLeague champion (1993); 3x WNBA champion (1998–2000); 8× Spanish League champion (1993, 1994, 1997, 1998, 2002, 2004, 2009, 2010); 9x Spanish Cup champion (1994, 1997, 1998, 2002–2004, 2009–2011); Russian League champion (2006); 3x Russian Cup champion (2006–2008)	
2023	Penny Taylor	Australia	SF	3× WNBA champion (2007, 2009, 2014); 3× WNBA All-Star (2002, 2007, 2011); All-WNBA First Team (2007); All-WNBA Second Team (2011); WNBL champion (1999); No. 13 retired by Phoenix Mercury; 3× WNBL All-Star Five (2001, 2002, 2015); 2× WNBL Top Shooter Award (2001, 2002); FIBA World Championship MVP (2006); 2x Summer Olympics silver medalist (2004, 2008); 3x World Cup medalist (2002 bronze, 2006 gold, 2014 bronze)	
2024	Miao Lijie	China	PG	WNBA Champion (2005); Chinese WCBA League champion (2011); 1x Asian Games silver medalist (1998); 3x Asian Games gold medalist (2002, 2006, 2010); 4x FIBA Women's Asia Cup gold medalist (2001, 2004, 2009, 2011); Debuted with the National Team at 16 years old (1997); Played in 1 FIBA U19 Women's Basketball World Cup (1997); Played in 1 FIBA U19 Women's Asian Championship (1998); Played in 4 Asian Games (1998, 2002, 2006, 2010); Played in 2 Diamond Cup Tournaments (2004, 2008); Played in 5 editions of the FIBA Women's Asia Cup (1999, 2001, 2004, 2009, 2011); Played in 4 FIBA Women's Basketball World Cups (1998, 2002, 2006, 2010); Played in 3 Olympic Games (2004, 2008, 2012); 2x FIBA Women's Asia Cup MVP (2004, 2011); First player to score 6.000 points in the Chinese WCBA League (2011); First Chinese player able to win both the Chinese WCBA League and the WNBA (2011); 5x Chinese WCBA League Regular Season MVP (2002, 2003, 2005, 2010, 2013); Chinese WCBA League Final MVP (2011)	
2024	Danira Nakic-Bilic	Yugoslavia; Croatia	SG	Summer Olympics Silver Medalist (1988)	
2024	Skaidrite Smildzina-Budovska	Latvia	C	11× EuroLeague Women champion (1960–1962, 1964–1969, 1971–1972)	
2025	Leonor Borrell	Cuba	C	Debuted with the National Team at the age of 16; 3x National School Games gold medallist (1976-1978); 3x Cuban National Champion (1986-1988); University Games silver medallist (1979); 3x FIBA Centrobasket gold medallist (1986, 1990, 1993); 2x Pan American Games silver medallist (1983, 1991); Pan American Games gold medallist (1979); FIBA AmeriCup gold medallist (1989); FIBA World Cup bronze medallist (1990); 4x Pan American Games MVP (1979, 1983, 1987, 1991); Played in 2 Olympic Games (1980, 1992); Played in 4 FIBA World Cups (1983, 1986, 1990, 1994); FIBA World Cup Top scorer (1986)	
2025	Ticha Penicheiro	Portugal	PG	1x WNBA Champion (2005); 4x WNBA All-Star (1999-2002); 2× All-WNBA First Team (1999–2000); All-WNBA Second Team (2001); All-Defensive First Team (2008); 7× WNBA assists leader (1998–2003, 2010); WNBA Peak Performer (2010); WNBA 15th Anniversary Team (2011); WNBA 20th Anniversary Team (2016); WNBA 25th Anniversary Team (2021); Polish National League champion (2001); Italian Cup winner (2002); French National League champion (2005); Russian National League champion (2007); Latvian National League champion (2008); Czech National League champion (2011); Turkish Cup winner (2012); EuroLeague champion (2007); EuroCup winner (2006); Wade Trophy (1998); 2x All-American – Kodak, USBWA (1997, 1998); 2x First-team All-American – AP (1997, 1998); 2x CAA Player of the Year (1996, 1997); 3x CAA All-Defensive Team (1996, 1997, 1998); 4x First-team All-CAA (1995, 1996, 1997, 1998); CAA Freshman of the Year (1995); CAA All-Freshman Team (1995); 1997 Final Four All-Tournament team	
2025	Dawn Staley	United States	PG	3x Summer Olympics Gold Medalist (1996, 2000, 2004); 6x WNBA All-Star (2001-2006); WNBA 10th Anniversary Team (2006); WNBA 15th Anniversary Team (2011); WNBA Three-Point Shootout champion (2006); WNBA Skills Challenge champion (2003); 2× ABL All-Star (1997, 1998); 2× USA Basketball Female Athlete of the Year (1994, 2004); NCAA Tournament MOP (1991); 2× ACC Female Athlete of the Year (1991, 1992); ACC Tournament MVP (1992); 2× Honda Sports Award (1991, 1992); Honda-Broderick Cup (1991); 2× Naismith College Player of the Year (1991, 1992); 2× WBCA Player of the Year (1991, 1992); 2× USBWA Player of the Year (1991, 1992); 2× ACC Player of the Year (1991, 1992); 3× Kodak All-American (1990–1992); 2× All-American – USBWA (1991, 1992); 3× First-team All-ACC (1990–1992); ACC Rookie of the Year (1989)	
2026	Sue Bird	United States	PG	5x Summer Olympics Gold Medalist (2004, 2008, 2012, 2016, 2020); 5x World Cup (2002 gold, 2006 bronze, 2010 gold, 2014 gold, 2018 gold); 4× WNBA champion (2004, 2010, 2018, 2020); 13× WNBA All-Star (2002, 2003, 2005–2007, 2009, 2011, 2014, 2015, 2017, 2018, 2021, 2022); 5× All-WNBA First Team (2002–2005, 2016); 3× All-WNBA Second Team (2008, 2010, 2011); 3× WNBA assists leader (2005, 2009, 2016); 3× WNBA peak performer (2005, 2009, 2016); WNBA 10th Anniversary Team (2006); WNBA 15th Anniversary Team (2011); WNBA 20th Anniversary Team (2016); WNBA 25th Anniversary Team (2021); Commissioner's Cup champion (2021); No. 10 retired by Seattle Storm; USA Basketball Female Athlete of the Year (2021); 5× Russian National League champion (2007, 2008, 2012–2014); 5× EuroLeague champion (2007–2010, 2013); 2× Europe SuperCup winner (2009, 2010); 2× NCAA champion (2000, 2002); 3× Nancy Lieberman Award (2000–2002); Wade Trophy (2002); Honda Sports Award (2002); Naismith College Player of the Year (2002); USBWA Women's National Player of the Year (2002); AP College Player of the Year (2002); Big East Player of the Year (2002); All-American – USBWA, Kodak (2002); First-team All-American – AP (2002); Third-team All-American – AP (2001); Senior CLASS Award (2002); 2× First-team All-Big East (2001, 2002); No. 10 retired by UConn Huskies	
2026	Céline Dumerc	France	PG	Summer Olympics Silver Medalist (2012); FIBA Europe Women's Player of the Year (2012); French player of the year (2017)	
2026	Clarisse Machanguana	Mozambique	C	Kodak All-American (1997); Second-team All-American – AP (1997); CAA Player of the Year (1995); CAA All-Defensive Team (1997); 3× First-team All-CAA (1995-1997); CAA All-Freshman Team (1995)	
2026	Ismenia Pauchard	Chile	C	15x Asociación de Básquetbol de Santiago Tournament champion (1953-1963, 1965-69, 1972-1973); 7x National Championship winner with Santiago Selection (1954-1956, 1960, 1962, 1963, 1970); 6x Opening Tournament winner (1961-1963, 1965, 1966, 1969); 1x South American All-Star Tournament winner (1957); 2x FIBA South American Women's Championship gold medalist (1956, 1960); 4x FIBA South American Women's Championship silver medalist (1954, 1962, 1967. 1968); 1x Pan-American silver medalist (1955); 2x Pan-American bronze medalist (1959, 1963); 2x third leading scorer at FIBA Women's Basketball World Cup (1957, 1964); Played in 8 FIBA South American Women’s Championships (1954, 1956, 1958, 1960, 1962, 1967, 1968, 1970); FIBA South American Women’s Championship Top Scorer (1968); Played in 4 Pan American Games (1955, 1959, 1963, 1967); Outstanding Athlete - 40 Years Revista Estadio	

=== Male coaches ===
In total, 32 individuals, have been inducted as male coaches.

Year	Inductee	Nationality	Achievements	Ref.
2007	Antonio Díaz-Miguel	Spain	Olympic Games silver medalist (1984); Basketball Hall of Fame (1997); FIBA Hall of Fame (2007); 5× FIBA European Selection (1977, 1978, 1981 (2×), 1982); Royal Order of Sports Merit Grand Cross (2000); Royal Order of Sports Merit Gold Medal (1994); 2× AEEB Spanish Coach of the Year (1981, 1983); Spanish Women's League champion (1997); Spanish Women's Cup winner (1997)	
2007	Alexander Gomelsky	Soviet Union; Russia	Olympic Games gold medalist (1988); Olympic Games silver medalist (1964); 2x Olympic Games bronze medalist (1968, 1980); 4× EuroLeague champion (1958–1960, 1971); Honored Coach of the USSR (1956); Master of Sports of the USSR International Class (1965); 13× Soviet League champion (1955, 1957, 1958, 1970–1974, 1976–1980); 2× Soviet Cup winner (1972, 1973); 4× Soviet Union Men's Basketball Coach of the Year (1967, 1977, 1982, 1988); Honored Coach of the Lithuanian SSR (1982); Olympic Order (1998); Contributor to Russian Basketball (2004); 50 Greatest EuroLeague Contributors (2008)	
2007	Henry "Hank" Iba	United States	2× Olympic Games gold medal (1964, 1968); Olympic Games silver medal (1972); 2× NCAA Division I champion (1945, 1946); 4x NCAA Final Four (1945, 1946, 1949, 1951)	
2007	Vladimir Kondrashin	Soviet Union; Russia	Olympic Games gold medalist (1972); Olympic Games bronze medalist (1976); 2× FIBA Saporta Cup champion (1973, 1975); Honored Coach of the USSR (1971); 2× Soviet / CIS League champion (1975, 1992); FIBA Order of Merit (1999); Contributor to Russian Basketball (2007)	
2007	Aleksandar Nikolić	Yugoslavia; Serbia	FIBA Order of Merit (1995); 2× FIBA Intercontinental Cup champion (1970, 1973); 3× EuroLeague champion (1970, 1972, 1973); 50 Greatest EuroLeague Contributors (2008); 2× European Coach of the Year (1966, 1976); FIBA European Selection (1979); FIBA Cup Winners' Cup champion (1974); 3× Italian League champion (1970, 1972, 1973); 3× Italian Cup winner (1970, 1971, 1973); Yugoslav League champion (1963); Yugoslav Cup winner (1962)	
2007	Giancarlo Primo	Italy	FIBA Order of Merit (2001); FIBA Hall of Fame (2007); FIBA Intercontinental Cup champion (1982); EuroLeague champion (1983); 3× FIBA European Selection (1974–1976); Italian Basketball Hall of Fame (2008); Gold Star for Sports Merit (Italy) (1998)	
2007	Dean Smith	United States	Olympic Games gold medal (1976); 2× NCAA Division I champion (1982, 1993); 11x NCAA Final Four (1967-1969, 1972, 1977, 1981, 1982, 1991, 1993, 1995, 1997); 13x ACC Tournament Champion (1967-1969, 1972, 1975, 1977, 1979, 1981, 1982, 1989, 1991, 1994, 1997); 17x ACC Regular Season Champion (1967-1969,1971, 1972, 1976-1979, 1982-1985, 1987, 1988, 1993, 1995); 1x NIT Tournament Champion (1971); Sports Illustrated Sportsman of the Year (1997); NABC Coach of the Year (1977); Naismith College Coach of the Year (1993); 8× ACC Coach of the Year (1967, 1968, 1971, 1976, 1977, 1979, 1988, 1993)	
2007	Togo Renan Soares "Kanela"	Brazil	Olympic Games bronze medalist (1960); South American Club champion (1953); Brazilian champion (1973); São Paulo State champion (1972); 20× Rio de Janeiro State champion (1939, 1942–1945, 1947–1949, 1951–1960, 1962, 1964)	
2007	Ranko Žeravica	Yugoslavia; Serbia	Olympic Games gold medalist (1980); Olympic Games silver medalist (1968); FIBA Korać Cup champion (1978); Yugoslav League champion (1996)	
2009	Pedro Ferrándiz	Spain	4× EuroLeague champion (1965, 1967, 1968, 1974); 12× Spanish League champion (1960–1962, 1965, 1968–1975); 11× Spanish Cup winner (1960–1962, 1965, 1967, 1970–1975); AEEB Spanish Coach of the Year (1975); Olympic Order (1977); FIBA Order of Merit (2000); 50 Greatest EuroLeague Contributors (2008)	
2009	Pete Newell	Canada; United States	Olympic Games gold medal (1960); NCAA Division I champion (1959); 2x NCAA Final Four (1959, 1960); 1x NIT Tournament Champion (1949); 3x PCC Regular Season Champion (1957–1959); AAWU Regular Season Champion (1960); Henry Iba Award (1960); NABC Coach of the Year (1960); UPI Coach of the Year (1960)	
2010	Evgeny Gomelsky	Soviet Union; Russia	Olympic Games gold medal (1992); Honored Coach of the Russian SSR (1967); Honored Coach of the USSR (1977); Russian Women's Basketball Coach of the Year (1998); Contributor to Russian Basketball (2008)	
2010	Lindsay Gaze	Australia	2× NBL champion (1993, 1997); 3× NBL Coach of the Year (1989, 1997, 1999); Australian Basketball Hall of Fame (2004)	
2010	Mirko Novosel	Yugoslavia; Croatia	Olympic Games silver medal (1976); Olympic Games bronze medal (1984); 2× EuroLeague champion (1985, 1986); European Coach of the Year (1985); 2× FIBA European Selection (1995); 2× FIBA Saporta Cup champion (1982, 1987); 2× Yugoslav League champion (1982, 1984); 7× Yugoslav Cup winner (1969, 1980–1983, 1985, 1988)	
2013	John "Jack" Donohue	United States; Canada	3x FIBA AmeriCup Medalist (1980 silver, 1984 bronze, 1988 bronze); 2x Summer Universiade Medalist (1983 gold, 1985 bronze)	
2013	Cesare Rubini	Italy	EuroLeague champion (1966); 2× FIBA Saporta Cup champion (1971, 1972); 9× Italian League champion (1958–1960, 1962, 1963, 1965–1967, 1972); Italian Cup winner (1972); FIBA Order of Merit (2002)	
2016	Jorge Hugo Canavesi	Argentina	1950 FIBA World Championship Champion; 3× Argentine Federation League champion (1945, 1953, 1970)	
2017	Dušan Ivković	Yugoslavia; Serbia	Olympic Games silver medal (1988); 3× FIBA EuroBasket Champion (1989, 1991, 1995); 1990 FIBA World Championship Champion; 2× EuroLeague Champion (1996–97, 2011–12); Yugoslav League champion (1979); Yugoslav Cup winner (1979); FIBA Korać Cup champion (1979); 3× Greek League champion (1992, 1997, 2012); 4× Greek Cup winner (1997, 2000, 2001, 2011); Saporta Cup champion (2000); 3× Russian League champion (2003–2005); Russian League Coach of the Year (2004); Russian Cup winner (2005); ULEB Cup champion (2006); EuroLeague Coach of the Year (2012); Greek League Best Coach (2012); Turkish Cup winner (2015); Turkish President's Cup winner (2015); 50 Greatest EuroLeague Contributors (2008); EuroLeague Basketball Legend Award (2017)	
2019	Bogdan Tanjević	Yugoslavia; Montenegro	2× EuroBasket medalist (1981, 1999); FIBA World Cup medalist (2010); EuroLeague champion (1979); Italian League champion (1996); Italian Cup winner (1996); Italian Basketball Hall of Fame (2016); 2× Turkish Super League champion (2008, 2010); Turkish Cup winner (2010); Turkish Supercup winner (2007); 2× Yugoslav League (1978, 1980); FR Yugoslav League champion (2001); Yugoslav Cup winner (2001); French League champion (2002)	
2019	Mou Zuoyun	China	Managing highlights (while serving as CBA Vice President, CBA President or State Ball Game Department Vice Director): 2x Asian Games for Women Gold Medalist (1982, 1986); Participated in 2 FIBA World Championship for Women (1983, 1994); Participated in 2 Olympic Games Tournament for Women (1984, 1992); Participated in 2 FIBA World Championship for Men (1986, 1994); Participated in Olympic Games for Men (1996); Participated in 10 FIBA Asia Championship for Men; 4x Asian Games for Men Gold Medalist; 6x FIBA Asia Championship for Women Champion; Competed as a player in the 1st Olympic Basketball Tournament (1936); Vice President of the Chinese Basketball Association (1956-1979); President of the Chinese Basketball Association (1979-1996); Former Vice President of FIBA Asia; Lifetime Honorary President of the Asian Basketball Association; Pioneer of Chinese basketball	
2020	Svetislav Pešić	Serbia	Spanish AEEB Coach of the Year (2019); 3× Spanish King's Cup winner (2003, 2018, 2019); 2× Spanish League champion (2003, 2004); 5× German League champion (1997, 1998, 1999, 2000, 2014); 2× German Cup winner (1997, 1999); 3× German League Coach of the Year (1996, 1998, 1999); Korać Cup champion (1995); EuroLeague champion (2003); FIBA EuroCup champion (2007); Yugoslav Cup winner (1984); Yugoslav League champion (1983)	
2020	Rubén Magnano	Argentina	Olympic Games gold medal (2004); FIBA AmeriCup gold medal (2001); Panamerican Games gold medal (2015); Pan American Club Championship champion (1996); 2× FIBA South American League champion (1997, 1998); 2× South American Club champion (1993, 1994); 4× Argentine League champion (1992, 1998, 1999, 2009); Argentine 2nd Division champion (1995); Argentine League Coach of the Year (2000)	
2021	Chuck Daly	United States	Olympic Games gold medal (1992); 2× NBA champion (1989, 1990); NBA All-Star Game head coach (1990); Top 10 Coaches in NBA History; Top 15 Coaches in NBA History; No. 2 retired by Detroit Pistons; 4× Ivy League champion (1971–1974); 5× Big 5 champion (1971–1974, 1977)	
2021	Tom Maher	Australia	Olympic Games silver medal (2000); Olympic Games bronze medal (1996)	
2021	Ettore Messina	Italy	4× EuroLeague champion (1998, 2001, 2006, 2008); 2× EuroLeague Coach of the Year (2006, 2008); European Coach of the Year (1998); 50 Greatest EuroLeague Contributors (2008); FIBA Cup Winners' Cup champion (1990); 6× Italian League champion (1993, 1998, 2000, 2001, 2002, 2003); 8× Italian Cup winner (1990, 1999, 2001–2005-2021); 2x Italian Supercup winner (2002–2020); 2× Best Italian Coach (1990, 1993); 3× Italian League Best Coach (1998, 2001, 2005); Italian Basketball Hall of Fame (2008); 3× Torneo Comunidad de Madrid champion (2009–2011); Trofeo Ciudat de Zaragoza champion (2011); 3× VTB United League champion (2008, 2013, 2014); VTB United League Hall of Fame (2019); 6× Russian League champion (2006–2009, 2013–2014); 2× Russian Cup winner (2006–2007); 4× Russian League Coach of the Year (2006–2009); 3× Gomelsky Cup champion (2012–2014)	
2022	Geno Auriemma	United States	2× Olympic Games gold medal (2012, 2016); 2× FIBA World Cup gold medal (2010, 2014); 12× NCAA Division I Tournament (1995, 2000, 2002–2004, 2009, 2010, 2013–2016, 2025); 25x NCAA Final Four (1991, 1995, 1996, 2000-2004, 2008-2022, 2024-2026); 24x Big East Tournament Champion (1989, 1991, 1994–2002, 2005, 2006, 2008–2012, 2021–2026); 25x Big East Regular Season Champion (1989–1991, 1994–2004, 2007–2011, 2021–2026); 7x AAC Tournament Champion (2014–2020); 7x AAC Regular Season Champion (2014–2020); 8× Naismith Coach of the Year (1995, 1997, 2000, 2002, 2008, 2009, 2016, 2017); 7× WBCA National Coach of the Year (1997, 2000, 2002, 2008, 2009, 2016, 2017); 9× AP Coach of the Year (1995, 1997, 2000, 2003, 2008, 2009, 2011, 2016, 2017); 6× USBWA Women's National Coach of the Year (1995, 2003, 2008, 2009, 2016, 2017); 14× Big East Coach of the Year (1989, 1995, 1997, 2000, 2002, 2003, 2008–2011, 2021, 2024–2026); 6× AAC Coach of the Year (2014–2017, 2019–2020); John R. Wooden Legends of Coaching Award (2012); National Italian American Sports Hall of Fame (2007); Winningest women's basketball coach in NCAA basketball history	
2022	Antonio Carlos Barbosa	Brazil	Sul-American Championship winner (1995); Panamerican Interclub Championship gold medalist (1995); Brazilian Cup winner (1995); Junior South American Championship gold medalist (1976); Junior AmeriCup silver & gold medalist (1977, 1978); U18 AmeriCup gold medalist (1996); 2x Junior South American Championship silver medalist (1996, 2005); Cadet South American Championship gold medalist (2001); U20 AmeriCup silver medalist (2002); 2x AmeriCup gold medalist (1997, 2001) and silver medalist (2005); Olympic Qualifying Americas Tournament gold (2003) and silver medalist (1999); 10x South American Championship gold medalist (1972, 1978, 1981, 1997, 1999, 2001, 2003, 2005, 2006, 2016); 2x Pan American Games bronze medalist (1983, 2003); Olympic Games bronze medalist (2000); Pan American Games gold & silver medalist (1971, 2007); Participated in 3 Olympic Games (2000,2004, 2016); Participated in 6 World Championships (1979, 1983, 1986,1998, 2002, 2006); More than 20 years coaching Brazil National Senior Team; 448 International games (330 victories)	
2022	Milan Vasojević	Serbia	Olympic Games silver medal (1988); Olympic Games bronze medal (1980); 2× EuroBasket medalist (1980, 1987)	
2023	Alessandro "Sandro" Gamba	Italy	2x European Cup Winners Cup champion (1975, 1976); 2x Italian League champion (1974, 1977); Olympic Games Silver Medalist (1980); 3X EuroBasket Gold Medalist (1983 gold, 1985 bronze, 1991 silver); Coached 4 Olympic Games (1980, 1984, 1988, 1992); Coached 6 EuroBasket competitions (1981, 1983, 1985, 1987, 1989, 1991); 2x FIBA European Selection (1991); Inducted into Italian Basketball Hall of Fame (2006); Inducted into Naismith Memorial Hall of Fame (2006)	
2024	Dan Peterson	United States	EuroLeague champion (1987); European Coach of the Year (1987); 50 Greatest EuroLeague Contributors (2008); FIBA Korać Cup champion (1985); 5× Italian League champion (1976, 1982, 1985–1987); 3× Italian Cup winner (1974, 1986, 1987); 2× Italian Coach of the Year (1986, 1987); Italian Basketball Hall of Fame (2012); Illinois Basketball Hall of Fame (1995)	
2025	Mike Krzyzewski	United States	3x Olympic Games Gold Medalist (2008, 2012, 2016); 4x FIBA World Championship Medalist (1990 bronze, 2006 bronze, 2010 gold, 2014 gold); 1x FIBA Americas Championship Gold Medalist (2007); 5x NCAA Division I champion (1991, 1992, 2001, 2010, 2015); 13x NCAA Final Four (1986, 1988-1992, 1994, 1999, 2001, 2004, 2010, 2015, 2022); 15x ACC Tournament Champion (1986, 1988, 1992, 1999-2003, 2005, 2006, 2009-2011, 2017, 2019); 13x ACC Regular Season Champion (1986, 1991, 1992, 1994, 1997-2001, 2004, 2006, 2010, 2022); The Sporting News Sportsman of the Year (1992); Sports Illustrated Sportsman of the Year (2011); 3× Naismith College Coach of the Year (1989, 1992, 1999); 2× NABC Coach of the Year (1991, 1999); Clair Bee Coach of the Year (2004); UPI Coach of the Year (1986); 5× ACC Coach of the Year (1984, 1986, 1997, 1999, 2000); Winningest men's basketball coach in NCAA basketball history	
2026	Ludwik Miętta	Poland	Polish Junior champion (1961); 6x Polish Cup winner (1959-1961, 1966, 1967, 1979); 14x Polish League champion (1963-1966, 1968-1971, 1975-1977, 1979-1981); Coached in 7 FIBA Women’s EuroBaskets (1964, 1966, 1980, 1981, 1983, 1985, 1987); Coached in 3 FIBA Women's Olympic Pre-Qualifying Tournaments (1980, 1984, 1988); 2x FIBA Women’s EuroBasket Silver Medalist (1980, 1981); 2x coach of the Women’s European Selection team (1972, 1981); Polish Basketball Federation Coach of the Year (1980); Over 26 consecutive seasons, his team stood on the Polish championship podium 21 times, including uninterruptedly from 1962 to 1977; PKOl Award for "Promotion of fair play values"; FIBA Commissioner (1989-2002); FIBA Women's Commission (1980–1994); FIBA Coaches Commission (1980–1988); Polish Silver Cross of Merit; City of Krakow Award (1996); Commander's Cross of the Order of Polonia Restituta (2002); Honorary Member of the Polish Basketball Association (2005); Honorary President of Wisła Kraków; Honorary President of the Wisła Sports Society	

NB:

- Newell was born in Canada, but became a U.S. citizen as a young adult, and made his coaching mark in the U.S.
- In addition, Newell is a member of the Naismith Memorial Hall of Fame, as a contributor, not as a coach.

=== Female coaches ===
In total, 8 individuals, have been inducted as female coaches.

Year	Inductee	Nationality	Achievements	Ref.
2007	Lidiya Alekseyeva	Russia	2× Summer Olympics medalist (1976, 1980); Honored Master of Sports of the USSR (1950); Order of Lenin (1957); Honored coach of the USSR (1964); Order of the Badge of Honor (1985)	
2009	Kay Yow	United States	2× Summer Olympics Gold Medalist (1984 as Assistant Coach, 1988 as Head Coach); 1x World Championship Gold Medal (1986); 1x NCAA Final Four (1998); 4x ACC Tournament Champion (1980, 1985, 1987, 1991); 5x ACC Regular Season Champion (1978, 1980, 1983, 1985, 1990); Jimmy V ESPY for Perseverance (2007)	
2013	Pat Summitt	United States	1x Summer Olympics Gold Medalist (1984); 2x World Championship medal (1979 gold, 1983 silver); 8× NCAA Division I tournament (1987, 1989, 1991, 1996–1998, 2007, 2008); 18x NCAA Final Four (1982, 1984, 1986-1989, 1991, 1995-1998, 2000, 2002-2005, 2007, 2008); 16x SEC Tournament Champion (1980, 1985, 1988, 1989, 1992, 1994, 1996, 1998-2000, 2005, 2006, 2008, 2010-2012); 16x SEC Regular Season Champion (1980, 1985, 1990, 1993-1995, 1998, 1999-2004, 2007, 2010, 2011); Presidential Medal of Freedom (2012); Sports Illustrated Sportswoman of the Year (2011); John R. Wooden Legends of Coaching Award (2008); Naismith Coach of the 20th Century (2000); 5× Naismith Coach of the Year (1987, 1989, 1994, 1998, 2004); 3× WBCA Coach of the Year (1983, 1995, 1998); AP Coach of the Year (1998); USBWA Coach of the Year (1998); 8× SEC Coach of the Year (1993, 1995, 1998, 2001, 2003, 2004, 2007, 2011); Best Coach/Manager ESPY Award (2008); NCAA Gerald R. Ford Award (2012)	
2015	Jan Stirling	Australia	2× Summer Olympics Silver Medalist (2004, 2008); 1x World Championship Gold Medal (2006)	
2019	Natália Hejková	Slovakia	Summer Olympics medalist (2008); 3× Czechoslovak Women's League champion (1991–1993); 10× Slovak Women's League champion (1993–2002); 2x Russian Women's Basketball Premier League champion (2007, 2008); 12x Czech Women's Basketball League champion (2013-2024); Slovak Women's Cup winner (1997); 6× EuroLeague Women champion (1999, 2000, 2007, 2008, 2015, 2025); 3x Czech Women's Cup winner (2014, 2015, 2021); FIBA Europe SuperCup Women champion (2015)	
2020	Tara VanDerveer	United States	Summer Olympics Gold Medalist (1996); World Championship medal (1994 bronze); 3x NCAA Division I Tournament (1990, 1992, 2021); 14x NCAA Final Four (1990-1992, 1995, 1997, 2008-2012, 2014, 2017, 2021, 2022); 15x Pac-10/12 Tournament Champion (2003-2005, 2007-2013, 2015, 2017, 2019, 2021, 2022); 27X Pac-10/12 Regular Season Champion (1989-1993, 1995-1998, 2001-2014, 2021-2024); 4x Big Ten Regular Season Champion (1982-1985); 5× National Coach of the Year (1988–1990, 2011, 2020); 18× Pac-10/12 Coach of the Year (1989, 1990, 1995, 1997, 2002, 2003, 2005, 2006, 2008, 2009, 2011–2014, 2018, 2021, 2022, 2024); 5× WBCA District/Region Coach of the Year (1988–1990, 2007, 2009); John R. Wooden Legends of Coaching Award (2014); 5× Northern California Women's Intercollegiate Coach of the Year (1988–1990, 1992, 1993); 2× Big Ten Coach of the Year (1984, 1985)	
2022	María Planas	Spain	6x Spanish Queen Cup Winner (1978-1980, 1987-1989); 7x Spanish League Champion (1975, 1976, 1978, 1987-1990); 4x participant of European Cup for Winners’ Cup; 2x participant of EuroBasket (1983, 1985); Pioneer & reference of Spanish women’s basketball; First & only woman head coach in the history of the women’s National Team (1978 – 1985); Bronze medal, Royal Order of Sports Merit of Spain (2009); Inducted into the Spanish Basketball Hall of Fame (2019)	
2023	Valérie Garnier	France	Summer Olympics bronze medalist (2020); 5× EuroBasket silver medalist (2013, 2015, 2017, 2019, 2021); EuroCup Women winner (2016); 3× French LFB League champion (2012, 2013, 2015); 2× French Cup winner (2014); 2× Turkish Super League champion (2018, 2019); 2× Turkish Cup winner (2019); Knight of the Legion of Honor (2013); Officer of the Legion of Honor (2021)	

=== Technical officials (referees) ===
In total, 14 individuals, have been inducted as technical officials.

Year	Inductee	Nationality	Achievements	Ref.
2007	Obrad Belošević	Serbia	FIBA Silver Whistle Award (1977)	
2007	Mario Hopenhaym	Uruguay	FIBA Order of Merit (2006)	
2007	Ervin Kassai	Hungary	FIBA Order of Merit (1994)	
2007	Vladimir Kostin	Russia		
2007	Allen Rae	Canada	FIBA Order of Merit (1997)	
2007	Pietro Reverberi	Italy		
2007	Renato Righetto	Brazil		
2009	Artenik Arabadjian	Bulgaria	FIBA Silver Whistle Award (1976)	
2009	Marcel Pfeuti	Switzerland	FIBA Order of Merit (1997)	
2010	Jim Bain	United States		
2010	Konstantinos Dimou	Greece	FIBA Golden Whistle Award (1982)	
2013	Valentin Lazarov	Bulgaria		
2013	Costas Rigas	Greece	50 Greatest EuroLeague Contributors (2008)	
2015	Robert Blanchard	France	FIBA Silver Whistle Award (1975); FIBA Order of Merit (1995)	

=== Contributors ===
==== National federations (8) ====
The original eight founding member national basketball federations of FIBA, in 1932.

Year	Inductee	Major Contribution	Ref.
2007	(Argentina) Argentine Federation	Founding member of FIBA	
2007	(Czechoslovakia) Czechoslovak Federation	Founding member of FIBA	
2007	(Greece) Greek Federation	Founding member of FIBA	
2007	(Italy) Italian Federation	Founding member of FIBA	
2007	(Latvia) Latvian Federation	Founding member of FIBA	
2007	(Portugal) Portuguese Federation	Founding member of FIBA	
2007	(Romania) Romanian Federation	Founding member of FIBA	
2007	(Switzerland) Swiss Federation	Founding member of FIBA	

==== Inductees (35) ====
Year	Inductee	Nationality	Role	Achievements	Ref.
2007	Nebojša Popović	Yugoslavia; Serbia		10× Yugoslav Men's League champion (1946–1955); 7× Yugoslav Women's League champion (1946–1952); FIBA Order of Merit (1997)	
2007	Radomir Šaper	Yugoslavia; Serbia		FIBA Order of Merit (1999)	
2007	Borislav Stanković	Yugoslavia; Serbia		Secretary-General of FIBA (1976–2003); Olympic Order (1987); Order of Merit of FR Germany (1987); National Order of the Lion (1999); Knight of the Legion of Honour (2001); Order of Merits of FR Yugoslavia (2002); Order of Honor of Republika Srpska (2010); FIBA Order of Merit (2015)	
2007	Anselmo López	Spain		Gran Cruz de la Real Orden del Mérito Civil (1991); FIBA Order of Merit (1994)	
2007	Raimundo Saporta	Spain		Olympic Order (1985); FIBA Order of Merit (1997)	
2007	Willard N. Greim	United States		President of the AAU (1944–1947).; Head of Joint Basketball Rules Committee, 1947; President of FIBA (1948–1960)	
2007	Edward S. Steitz	United States			
2007	Decio Scuri	Italy			
2007	Antonio dos Reis Carneiro	Brazil		President of FIBA (1960–1968)	
2007	José Cláudio dos Reis	Brazil			
2007	Abdel Azim Ashry	Egypt		FIBA Order of Merit (1997)	
2007	Abdel Moneim Wahby	Egypt		President of FIBA (1968–1976)	
2007	Nikolai Semashko	Soviet Union			
2007	Robert Busnel	France		President of FIBA (1984–1990); Olympic Order (1990); National Order of Merit (France); Officer of the Legion of Honor (1989); Glory of Sport (1994)	
2007	Renato William Jones	United Kingdom		Secretary-General of FIBA (1932–1976); Olympic Order (1980); FIBA Order of Merit (1994)	
2007	Turgut Atakol	Turkey			
2007	Marian Kozłowski	Poland		FIBA Order of Merit (1996)	
2007	Ferenc Hepp	Hungary			
2007	August Pitzl	Austria		FIBA Order of Merit (1997)	
2007	Léon Bouffard	Switzerland		President of FIBA (1932–1948)	
2007	James Naismith	Canada; United States		Inventor of the sport of basketball	
2007	Eduardo Airaldi Rivarola	Peru		Olympic Order (1992)	
2007	Dionisio "Chito" Calvo	Philippines			
2007	Yoshimi Ueda	Japan		FIBA Order of Merit (1994)	
2007	Yoon Duk-joo	South Korea		FIBA Order of Merit (1995)	
2009	Al Ramsay	Australia		FIBA Order of Merit (2002)	
2009	Luis Martín	Argentina		FIBA Order of Merit (1994)	
2010	George Killian	United States		President of the International University Sports Federation (FISU) – 1999–2011; President of the International Basketball Federation (FIBA) – 1990–1998; Member of the International Olympic Committee (IOC) – 1996–1998; Board of trustees of the Naismith Memorial Basketball Hall of Fame – 1969–2004; Gold Medal Award from the Basketball Federation of Poland (1998); FIBA Order of Merit (2000)	
2010	Ernesto Segura de Luna	Spain		FIBA Order of Merit (2002)	
2010	Hans-Joachim Otto	Germany		FIBA Order of Merit (1994)	
2010	Abdoulaye Sèye Moreau	Senegal		President of FIBA (1998–2002).; FIBA Order of Merit (2002)	
2013	Aldo Vitale	Italy			
2015	Noah Klieger	Israel		FIBA Order of Merit (2010); Knight of the Legion of Honour (2012)	
2016	Juan Antonio Samaranch	Spain		President of the International Olympic Committee (1980 – 2001); Knight Grand Cross of the Order of Isabella the Catholic; Collar of the Order of Isabella the Catholic; Knight Grand Cross of the Order of Charles III; Knight Grand Cross of the Order of Civil Merit; Grand Cross of the Order of Cisneros; Grand Cross of the Royal Order of Sports Merit; Gold Medal of the Generalitat de Catalunya (1985); Commander with Star of the Order of Merit of the Republic of Poland (1994); Grand Decoration for Services to the Republic of Austria in Gold with Star (1994); Order of the Yugoslav Flag with Sash; Order of Friendship of Peoples (1994); Order of the Cross of Terra Mariana, First Class (2003); Grand Cross of the Grand Order of King Tomislav; Order of the Golden Fleece (2001); Grand Cross of the Ancient Order of Sikatuna; Grand Cross of the Order of the Lithuanian Grand Duke Gediminas; Order of the Republic; Order of Honour; Order of the White Double Cross, 1st Class (2000); Order of Prince Yaroslav the Wise, 3rd class; Medal of the Oriental Republic of Uruguay (2000); Grand Officer of the Order of Merit of the Italian Republic; Grand Cross of the Order of Merit of the Italian Republic	
2016	David Stern	United States		Commissioner of the NBA (1984–2014); Olympic Order (2012)	

== Current candidates ==
These basketball players and coaches are eligible candidates to possibly become FIBA Hall of Fame inductees in the future.

=== Male player candidates (64) ===
- (Brazil) Waldemar Blatskauskas
- (Brazil) Alfredo da Motta
- (Brazil) Zenny "Algodão" de Azevedo
- (Brazil) Ruy de Freitas
- (Brazil) Carmo "Rosa Branca" de Souza
- (Brazil) Marcel de Souza
- (Brazil) Edson Bispo dos Santos
- (Brazil) Affonso Évora
- (Brazil) Carlos "Mosquito" Domingos Massoni
- (Brazil) Jatyr Eduardo Schall
- (Brazil) Antônio Salvador Sucar
- (Brazil) Edio José Alves
- (Latvia) Rūdolfs Jurciņš
- (Latvia) Juris Kalniņš
- (Latvia) Jānis Krūmiņš
- (Latvia) Valdis Muižnieks
- (Latvia) Juris Silarājs
- (Latvia) Gunars Siliņš
- (Latvia) Maigonis Valdmanis
- (Lithuania) Sergejus Jovaiša
- (Lithuania) Artūras Karnišovas
- (Lithuania) Rimas Kurtinaitis
- (Lithuania) Frank Lubin (Pranas Lubinas)
- (Lithuania) Arvydas Macijauskas
- (Lithuania) Saulius Štombergas
- (Serbia) Dejan Bodiroga
- (Serbia) Predrag Danilović
- (Serbia) Aleksandar Đorđević
- (Serbia) Žarko Paspalj
- (Slovenia) Boris Kristančič
- (Slovenia) Peter Vilfan
- (Slovenia) Aljoša Žorga
- (United States) Magic Johnson
- (United States) Bob Kurland
- (United States) Bob Morse
- (United States) Jerry West
- (Greece) Fanis Christodoulou
- (Greece) Georgios Kolokithas
- (Bulgaria) Iliya Mirchev
- (Bulgaria) Konstantin Totev
- (France) Richard Dacoury
- (France) Alain Gilles
- (Puerto Rico) Raymond Dalmau
- (Puerto Rico) Juan "Pachín" Vicéns
- (Poland) Mieczysław Młynarski
- (Russia) Gennadi Volnov
- (Australia) Ed Palubinskas
- (Canada) Leo Rautins
- (Croatia) Dino Rađa
- (Cuba) Pedro Chappé
- (Czech Republic) Ivan Mrázek
- (Ecuador) Nicolás Lapentti
- (Hungary) János Greminger
- (Iran) Aidin Nikkhah Bahrami
- (Mexico) Arturo Guerrero
- (Netherlands) Rik Smits
- (Spain) Francisco "Nino" Buscató
- (South Sudan) Manute Bol
- (Syria) Jacques Bachayani
- (Syria) Tarif Koutrach
- (Iraq) Ahmed Abdul Ghafour Al-Samarrai
- (Iraq) Zuhair Mohammad Salih
- (Jordan) Awwad Mfadi Haddad
- (Tunisia) Lamjed Njah

=== Female player candidates (27) ===
- (Brazil) Marlene José Bento
- (Brazil) Maria "Heleninha" Helena Campos
- (Brazil) Maria Helena Cardoso
- (Brazil) Laís Elena Aranha da Silva
- (Brazil) Nilza Monte Garcia
- (Brazil) Delcy Ellender Marques
- (Brazil) Norma "Norminha" Pinto de Oliveira
- (Latvia) Dzintra Grundmane
- (Latvia) Helēna Bitnere-Hehta
- (Latvia) Silvija Ravdone-Krodere
- (Latvia) Maija Saleniece-Siliņa
- (Latvia) Dzidra Uztupe-Karamiševa
- (Italy) Mara Fullin
- (Italy) Liliana Mabel Bocchi
- (Lithuania) Angelė Rupšienė
- (Lithuania) Vida Šulskytė-Beselienė
- (Russia) Nina Poznanskaya
- (Russia) Tatyana Ovechkina
- (Russia) Olga Sukharnova
- (Australia) Lauren Jackson
- (Hungary) Lenke Kiss
- (United States) Lynette Woodard
- (Austria) Adriana Bilik-Biermaier
- (China) Liu Yumin
- (France) Yannick Souvré
- (Serbia) Marija Veger Demšar
- (Spain) Elisabeth Cebrián

=== Male coach candidates (25) ===
- (Serbia) Božidar Maljković
- (Serbia) Željko Obradović
- (Latvia) Oļģerts Altbergs
- (Latvia) Valdemārs Baumanis
- (Latvia) Raimonds Karnītis
- (Belarus) Semen Khalipski
- (Bulgaria) Dimitar Mitev
- (Bulgaria) Ivan Galabov
- (Italy) Valerio Bianchini
- (Poland) Witold Zagórski
- (Lithuania) Vydas Gedvilas
- (France) Joë Jaunay
- (Greece) Nikos Nissiotis
- (Puerto Rico) Julio Toro
- (Slovenia) Zmago Sagadin
- (United States) / (Israel) David Blatt
- (Algeria) Tayeb Abdelhadi
- (Algeria) Kaddour Bilekdar
- (Algeria) Tayeb Zenati
- (Tunisia) Mohamed Adel Tlatli
- (Jordan) Rizk Waheed Al-Masri
- (Syria) Rateb Sheikh Najeeb
- (Iraq) Fawzi Asker Dawood
- (Iraq) Ghazi Talib
- (Iran) Mehran Shahintab

== See also ==
- FIBA Hall of Fame
- Naismith Memorial Basketball Hall of Fame
  - List of members of the Naismith Memorial Basketball Hall of Fame
  - List of players in the Naismith Memorial Basketball Hall of Fame
  - List of coaches in the Naismith Memorial Basketball Hall of Fame
- EuroLeague Hall of Fame
- College Basketball Hall of Fame
- Women's Basketball Hall of Fame
- Italian Basketball Hall of Fame
- Greek Basket League Hall of Fame
- French Basketball Hall of Fame
- VTB United League Hall of Fame
- Finnish Basketball Hall of Fame
- Australian Basketball Hall of Fame
- Philippine Basketball Association Hall of Fame
