= Anselmo López (basketball) =

Spanish basketball coach and administrator

Anselmo López (May 5, 1910 in Velayos, Spain – December 14, 2004 in Madrid, Spain) was a Spanish basketball coach and administrator. He was a head coach of the Spain national basketball team in 1947–1950, president of the Spanish Basketball Federation in 1966–1971, vice-president (in 1967–1971) and Secretary General (in 1971–1986) of the Spanish Olympic Committee. He was awarded the top civil distinction in Spain, Gran Cruz de la Real Orden del Mérito Civil, in 1991. He was awarded the FIBA Order of Merit, in 1994. In 2007, he was enshrined in the FIBA Hall of Fame as a contributor.
