= Yoon Duk-joo =

South Korean basketball administrator (1921–2005)

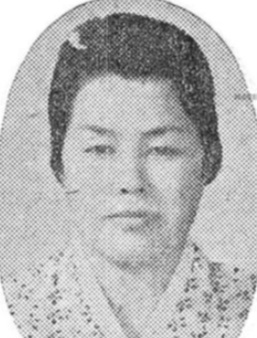

Korean name
- Hangul: 윤덕주
- Hanja: 尹德珠
- RR: Yun Deokju
- MR: Yun Tŏkchu

Yoon Duk-joo (June 23, 1921, in Korea – July 8, 2005, in South Korea) was a South Korean basketball administrator. She served as the director of the Korea Basketball Association (1952–1954), president of the Women's Committee of the Asian Basketball Confederation (current FIBA Asia) (1986–1996), president of the Women's Commission of the FIBA (1986–1995) and vice-president of the Korean Olympic Committee (1993–1997). In 1995, she was awarded the FIBA Order of Merit. She was enshrined as a contributor in the FIBA Hall of Fame in 2007.
