= George E. Killian =

American sports administrator, former president of the FISU and the FIBA

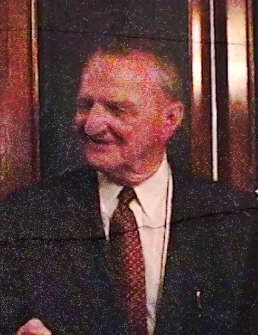
- Born: George Ernest Killian; April 6, 1924
- Died: December 6, 2017 (aged 93)
- Occupations: Ex-president of the FISU and FIBA

George Ernest Killian (April 6, 1924 – December 6, 2017) was an American sports administrator, president of the International University Sports Federation (FISU) and the International Basketball Federation (FIBA)

== Education ==
After receiving his Bachelor of Science degree in education from the Ohio Northern University in 1949, Killian obtained a Master's degree in Education from the University at Buffalo, N.Y. in 1954. The Ohio Northern University honored him in 1989 with a PhD in Public Service.

== Career ==
Killian coached basketball teams of Wharton High School between 1949 and 1951 and Erie Community College, Buffalo, N.Y. from 1954 to 1969. He was president of the international basketball federation FIBA between 1990 and 1998. In 1996, he was member of the International Olympic Committee in his capacity as president of FIBA. Killian served also as treasurer of COPABA, Panamaerican Basketball Confederation and director of the NJCAA, National Junior College Athletic Association.

After presiding the US delegation at the Universiades three times, Killian held office in FISU. He was member of the International Control Commission from 1975 to 1987. Then, he was elected vice president of FISU. In 1995, Killian was promoted to First Vice President. On November 26, 1999, he was confirmed as FISU President by the executive committee succeeding late Dr. Primo Nebiolo.

On August 5, 2007, Killian was reelected for a second full term as president of FISU by an overwhelming majority of the votes at FISU's 30th General Assembly, which was held in Bangkok, Thailand.

On August 9, 2011, he was replaced by Claude-Louis Gallien as FISU President.

=== Accomplishments ===
- President of the International University Sports Federation (FISU) – 1999–2011
- President of the International Basketball Federation (FIBA) – 1990–1998
- Member of the International Olympic Committee (IOC) – 1996–1998
- President of the Naismith Memorial Basketball Hall of Fame – 1977–1978
- Board of trustees of the Naismith Memorial Basketball Hall of Fame – 1969–2004
- Award winner – Men's Naismith Outstanding Contribution to Basketball – 2004
- Inductee to the Women's Basketball Hall of Fame – 2000

=== Awards ===
- Ohio Northern University Athletic Hall of Fame – 1979
- W.P. Fehring Award of Merit from the U.S. Baseball Federation – 1982
- NJCAA Baseball Coaches Hall of Fame – 1987
- NJCAA Basketball Hall of Fame – 1988
- John W. Bunn Award from the Naismith Memorial Basketball Hall of Fame – 1989
- Gold Medal Award from the Basketball Federation of Poland – 1998
- FIBA Order of Merit – 2000
- FIBA Hall of Fame - 2010

=== Former Volunteer Positions ===
- Secretary/Treasurer – U.S. Track and Field Federation
- Board of Directors – U.S. Gymnastics Federation, Basketball Federation of the US, Amateur Basketball
- Association of the US, U.S. Wrestling Federations
- U.S. Olympic Administrative Committee
