= Abdel Azim Ashry =

Egyptian basketball player, referee, and sports administrator

Abdel Azim Ashry (Arabic: عبد العظيم عشري; October 31, 1911, in Egypt – March 2, 1997, in Egypt) was an Egyptian basketball player, referee and sports administrator. In 1985, he was a recipient of the Silver Olympic Order.

== Career ==
Ashry played in the Egyptian first division basketball league in the 1930s and 1940s. Upon retiring, he became a referee, calling in the 1948 Olympic Games (including the USA-France final), 1950 World Championship (including the Argentina-USA final), 1952 Olympic Games (including the USA-USSR final) and 1954 World Championship (including the USA-Brazil final). Subsequently, he served as the president of the Egyptian Basketball Federation in 1972-1985, the president of the Egyptian Olympic Committee in 1978-1985 and secretary general of AFABA (currently FIBA Africa) in 1965-1997. In 1997, he was awarded the FIBA Order of Merit. He was enshrined in the FIBA Hall of Fame in 2007 as a contributor.

Sporting positions
Preceded by Muhammad Ahmad Muhammad	President of the Egyptian Olympic Committee; 1978–1985	Succeeded by Abdel Karim Darwish
