= Eduardo Airaldi Rivarola =

Peruvian basketball player, coach, referee and administrator

Eduardo Airaldi Rivarola (January 11, 1922 in Puerto del Callao, Peru – March 5, 1992 in Peru) was a Peruvian basketball player, coach, referee and administrator. As a player, he won the 1943 South American Championship with the Peru team. He also was a coach of club teams in Peru, and an international referee, calling games in the 1950 FIBA World Championship and 1954 FIBA World Championship (including the USA-Brazil final game). He later served as the president of the Peruvian Basketball Federation, secretary general of COPABA (currently FIBA Americas), and a member of FIBA Central Board. He was awarded an Olympic Order. In 2007 he was inducted into the FIBA Hall of Fame as a contributor.
