= FIBA Order of Merit =

FIBA Order of Merit is an international basketball award that is awarded by FIBA, the international basketball federation. The award is given to individuals that have made very significant individual contributions to furthering the sport of basketball. The award was first established in July 1994.

== Recipients ==
Order	Name	Country	Date	Location	FIBA Zone
1.	R. William Jones	United Kingdom	July 1994	Toronto	FIBA World
2.	Krešimir Ćosić	Croatia	July 1994	Toronto	FIBA Europe
3.	Cliff Fagan	United States	July 1994	Toronto	FIBA Americas
4.	Ursula Frank	Germany	July 1994	Toronto	FIBA Europe
5.	Norman Gloag	Canada	July 1994	Toronto	FIBA Americas
6.	Moctar Guene	Senegal	July 1994	Toronto	FIBA Africa
7.	Ervin Kassai	Hungary	July 1994	Toronto	FIBA Europe
8.	Anselmo López	Spain	July 1994	Toronto	FIBA Europe
8.	Luis A. Martin	Argentina	July 1994	Toronto	FIBA Americas
10.	Hans-Joachim Otto	Germany	July 1994	Toronto	FIBA Europe
11.	Gonzalo Puyat II	Philippines	July 1994	Toronto	FIBA Asia
12.	Bozhidar Takev	Bulgaria	July 1994	Toronto	FIBA Europe
13.	Bira Maciel	Brazil	July 1994	Toronto	FIBA Americas
14.	Yoshimi Ueda	Japan	July 1994	Toronto	FIBA Asia
15.	Enrico Vinci	Italy	July 1994	Toronto	FIBA Europe
16.	William Wall	United States	July 1994	Toronto	FIBA Americas
17.	Sergei Belov	Russia	April 1995	Lausanne	FIBA Europe
18.	Robert Blanchard	France	April 1995	Lausanne	FIBA Europe
19.	Aca Nikolić	Yugoslavia	April 1995	Lausanne	FIBA Europe
20.	Alberto Rosello	Uruguay	April 1995	Lausanne	FIBA Americas
21.	Yoon Duk-joo	South Korea	April 1995	Lausanne	FIBA Asia
22.	Marian Kozłowski	Poland	April 1996	Munich	FIBA Europe
23.	Abdel Azim Ashry	Egypt	March 1997	Rio de Janeiro	FIBA Africa
24.	Antonio Lisanti	Uruguay	March 1997	Rio de Janeiro	FIBA Americas
25.	Marcel Pfeuti	Switzerland	March 1997	Rio de Janeiro	FIBA Europe
26.	August Pitzl	Austria	March 1997	Rio de Janeiro	FIBA Europe
27.	Nebojša Popović	Yugoslavia	March 1997	Rio de Janeiro	FIBA Europe
28.	Allen Rae	Canada	March 1997	Rio de Janeiro	FIBA Americas
29.	Emiliano Rodríguez	Spain	March 1997	Rio de Janeiro	FIBA Europe
30.	Raimundo Saporta	Spain	March 1997	Rio de Janeiro	FIBA Europe
31.	Federico Slinger	Uruguay	March 1997	Rio de Janeiro	FIBA Americas
32.	Zacharias Alexandrou	Greece	April 1998	Munich	FIBA Europe
33.	Walther Tröger	Germany	April 1998	Munich	FIBA Europe
34.	Aldo Vitale	Italy	April 1998	Munich	FIBA Europe
35.	Abdou Diouf	Senegal	May 1999	Barcelona	FIBA Africa
36.	Ruperto Herrera Tabio	Cuba	May 1999	Barcelona	FIBA Americas
37.	Vladimir Kondrashin	Russia	May 1999	Barcelona	FIBA Europe
38.	Mauricio Martelino	Philippines	May 1999	Barcelona	FIBA Asia
39.	Radomir Šaper	Yugoslavia	May 1999	Barcelona	FIBA Europe
40.	Chang-Lu Zhang	China	May 2000	Munich	FIBA Asia
41.	Lorraine Landon	Australia	November 2000	Munich	FIBA Oceania
42.	Pedro Ferrándiz	Spain	November 2000	Munich	FIBA Europe
43.	George E. Killian	United States	November 2000	Munich	FIBA Americas
44.	Fumiya Tamiaki	Japan	November 2000	Munich	FIBA Asia
45.	Jean-Marie Weber	Switzerland	November 2000	Munich	FIBA Europe
46.	Giancarlo Primo	Italy	April 2001	Munich	FIBA Europe
47.	Eugenio Korwin	Italy	June 2002	Geneva	FIBA Europe
48.	Miloslav Kříž	Czech Republic	June 2002	Geneva	FIBA Europe
49.	Kenneth Charles	United Kingdom	November 2002	Geneva	FIBA Europe
50.	Keith Mitchell	United Kingdom	November 2002	Geneva	FIBA Europe
51.	Alistair Ramsay	Australia	November 2002	Geneva	FIBA Oceania
52.	Cesare Rubini	Italy	November 2002	Geneva	FIBA Europe
53.	Ernesto Segura de Luna	Spain	November 2002	Geneva	FIBA Europe
54.	Abdoulaye Sèye Moreau	Senegal	November 2002	Geneva	FIBA Africa
55.	Geneviève Hartmann	France	November 2003	Geneva	FIBA Europe
56.	Zine El Abidine Ben Ali	Tunisia	May 2005	Nyon	FIBA Africa
57.	Alexander Boshkov	Bulgaria	May 2005	Nyon	FIBA Europe
58.	Mario Hopenhaym	Uruguay	August 2006	Tokyo	FIBA Americas
59.	Jacques Huguet	France	August 2006	Tokyo	FIBA Europe
60.	George Vassilakopoulos	Greece	September 2010	Istanbul	FIBA Europe
61.	Mario Arceri	Italy	September 2010	Istanbul	FIBA Europe
62.	Noah Klieger	Israel	September 2010	Istanbul	FIBA Europe
63.	Ken Madsen	Australia	September 2010	Istanbul	FIBA Oceania
64.	Manfred Stroher	Germany	June 2015	Mies	FIBA Europe
65.	Borislav Stanković	Serbia	June 2015	Mies	FIBA World
66.	Bill McInnes	United Kingdom	May 2017	Hong Kong	FIBA Europe
67.	Manny Pangilinan	Philippines	August 2023	Manila	FIBA Asia

== See also ==
- Olympic Order
- Radomir Šaper Prize
- FIBA Silver Plate
- FIBA Hall of Fame
- FIBA's 50 Greatest Players (1991)
- 50 Greatest EuroLeague Contributors (2008)
- EuroLeague 2000–2010 All-Decade Team
- EuroLeague 2010–2020 All-Decade Team
- EuroLeague Legends

== Notes ==
- FIBA.com Internal Regulations of the International Basketball Federation (FIBA) 2010.
- FIBA.com Internal Regulations of the International Basketball Federation (FIBA) 2006.
