= Allen Rae =

Canadian basketball referee

Personal information
- Born: December 26, 1932 Weyburn, Saskatchewan, Canada
- Died: August 20, 2016 (aged 83) Ottawa, Ontario, Canada
- Position: Referee

Career highlights
- FIBA Order of Merit (1997); Canada Basketball Hall of Fame (2000); FIBA Hall of Fame (2007)
- FIBA Hall of Fame

Allen Rae (December 26, 1932 – August 20, 2016) was a Canadian basketball referee. He refereed in the 1964 Olympics, 1968 Olympics, 1972 Olympics (including a semi-final game in each of those) and 1976 Olympics. He also refereed the final of the 1975 European Championship. He was the Technical Commissioner in 1984 Olympics, 1988 Olympics, 1992 Olympics, 1990 World Championship and 1983 Pan American Games. From 1984 to 1994, he served as Vice President of the Technical Commission of the FIBA. He also served as the President of the Dr. James Naismith Basketball Foundation & Museum since 2003. In 1997 Rae was awarded FIBA Order of Merit, and in 2007 he was enshrined in the FIBA Hall of Fame (also inducted to Canada Basketball Hall of Fame in 2000).
