= Lorraine Landon =

Australian basketball administrator (born 1947)

- Born: Lorraine May Landon; 29 January 1947 (age 78)
- Occupation(s): Basketball administrator Coach
- Years active: 1968–present

Lorraine May Landon OAM (born 29 January 1947) is an Australian basketball administrator and former player and coach. She was introduced to the game of basketball through the Bankstown Bruins and represented the New South Wales team between 1968 and 1975. Landon was general manager of the Bankstown Association and the Bankstown Basketball Stadium's manager and was the volunteer tea manager of the Australia women's national basketball team (Australia Opals). She was subsequently appointed manager of the National Basketball League's (NBL) Sydney Kings and the Women's National Basketball League's (WNBL) Sydney Uni Flames and guided both the Australia men's national wheelchair basketball team (Australian Rollers) and the Australia women's national wheelchair basketball team (Australia Gliders) to Paralympic success. Landon is an inductee of the Australian Basketball Hall of Fame and received honours such as the FIBA Order of Merit and the Australian Sports Medal.

== Career ==
Landon was born on 29 January 1947. She was introduced to the game of basketball by playing for the Bankstown Bruins and represented the New South Wales (NSW) team as a player from 1968 to 1975 as she coached junior and senior sides between 1970 and 1982. Landon won the 1975 Australian Basketball Championships as captain of the NSW squad. She was appointed general manager of the Bankstown Association and the Bankstown Basketball Stadium's manager in that year. Landon was a volunteer team manager of the Australia women's national basketball team (Australia Opals) for each of the 1984 Summer Olympics in Los Angeles, the 1986 FIBA World Championship for Women and the 1988 Summer Olympics in Seoul. She was also head of delegations for the team's 1984 tour of China and at four FIBA Under-19 Basketball World Cups until 2011.

In 1989, Landon became the first woman to hold the post of manager in either the men's and women's competitions when she was appointed manager of both the National Basketball League's (NBL) Sydney Kings and the Women's National Basketball League's (WNBL) Sydney Uni Flames. The Flames won two WNBL championships and the Kings lasted until the NBL finals five times during her time at the two teams. She left both posts in 1997. The following year, Landon was made competition manager for basketball and competition manager for Intellectual Disability Basketball, Wheelchair Basketball and Wheelchair Rugby at the 2000 Summer Olympics and 2000 Summer Paralympics in Sydney. She guided the Australia men's national wheelchair basketball team (Australian Rollers) to gold and silver medals in Paralympic competition as well as a World Championship bronze. Landon helped the Australia women's national wheelchair basketball team (Australia Gliders) win Paralympic bronze and silver medals.

Landon served on international and national basketball organisations for about three decades, including as the WNBL's executive director, a Basketball NSW (BNSW) board member of its sports advisory committee (the only female to hold the post), vice-president of the international governing body FIBA's women commission for 11 years, is a director of both the Director for Sport Inclusion Australia and the Western Sydney Academy of Sport, and a life member of the BNSW and the Bankstown club. She discussed with the Australian Broadcasting Corporation executives her concern about the broadcaster's proposals to discard its live coverage of nationals sport in 2001.

== Personal life ==
She has three children and five grandchildren.

== Honours ==
In 2000, Landon received the IOC Golden Rings and the FIBA Order of Merit. She received the Australian Sports Medal as an "Administrator, Past Australian representative and Olympian and Life member of Basketball NSW" on 14 July of the same year. In 2004, Landon was given the IOC Women in Sport Award. In the 2011 Australia Day Honours, she was awarded the Medal of the Order of Australia (OAM) "for service to basketball through a range of managerial and administrative roles." Landon was added to the Australian Basketball Hall of Fame in 2019. A breasted yellow Australian Olympic Team blazer that she wore at the 1984 Summer Olympics is held in the collection of the Australian Sports Museum on loan from Basketball Australia.
