= Mohsen Medhat Warda =

Egyptian basketball player

Medhat Mohsen Warda
Personal information
- Born: 1 November 1955 (age 71)
- Listed height: 6 ft 1 in (1.85 m)
- Listed weight: 165 lb (75 kg)
- Position: Center
- FIBA Hall of Fame

Medhat Mohsen Warda (born 1 November 1955) is an Egyptian basketball player. He competed in the men's tournament at the 1984 Summer Olympics. He was inducted into the FIBA Hall of Fame in 2019.
