= Noah Klieger =

Israeli journalist and sports administrator

- נח קליגר
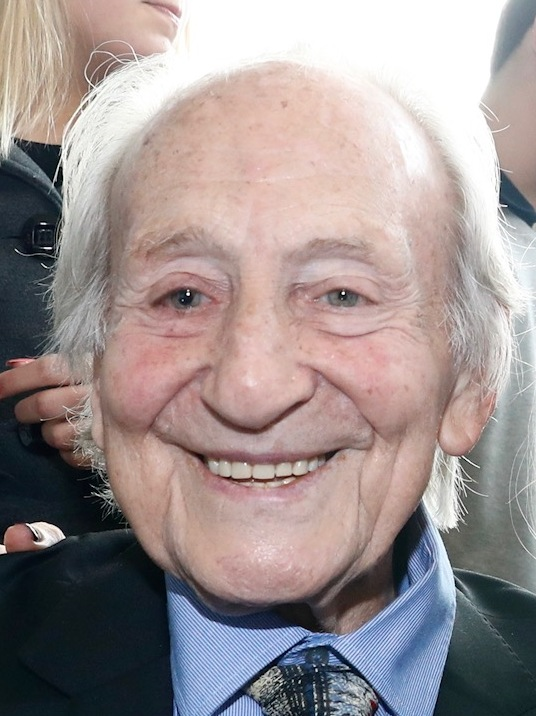
- Noah Klieger at an event marking International Holocaust Remembrance Day in Madrid, 2018
- Born: 31 July 1925; Strasbourg, France
- Died: 13 December 2018 (aged 93); Tel Aviv, Israel
- Occupations: Journalist, sports executive
- Years active: 1945–2016

Noah Klieger (Hebrew: נח קליגר; 31 July 1925 – 13 December 2018) was an Israeli journalist and sports administrator. Klieger, a survivor of the Nazi concentration camps Auschwitz, Mittelbau-Dora and Ravensbruck, covered trials of Nazi criminals after the end of World War II, besides working as a sports journalist in Israel. He also was the president of the basketball club Maccabi Tel Aviv and chairman of the FIBA's media council. In 2010 he was awarded the FIBA Order of Merit, and in 2012 became a Chevalier of the Légion d'honneur. In 2015, Klieger was inducted into the FIBA Hall of Fame for his contributions.

== Early life ==
Klieger was born in 1925 in Strasbourg. His older brother Jonathan was born in Germany, but their family later relocated, first to France, and then to Belgium in 1938.

After the start of WWII, when Belgium fell under Nazi occupation, 13-year-old Klieger helped found a Zionist youth underground organization. Members of his group passed messages between adult underground cells, helped obtain ration stamps, and smuggled Belgian Jews to Switzerland. Overall, Klieger's cell successfully smuggled some 270 Jews to this neutral country. However, when his own turn came to leave Belgium in 1942, he was caught at the border by the Germans.

Klieger was interned for a period of time in the Mechelen transit camp and in January 1944 he was sent to Auschwitz. There he contracted pneumonia and expected to be murdered, but, as Klieger recalled later, he personally addressed chief physician Mengele and other physicians who accompanied him and succeeded in persuading them that he still could be of use. One of the doctors agreed to send him back to barracks. Later he was saved from extermination by an extraordinary stroke of luck: one of the SS officers running the camp turned out to be an avid boxing fan and decided to form a boxing team of Auschwitz prisoners. Despite having no previous boxing experience, 16-year-old Klieger volunteered to join the team. Other team members who did have such experience in the pre-war world read his bluff but helped him stay on the team, withholding their own hits and allowing him to hit them. Together with his teammates Noah was fed better than other prisoners and sometimes even received soup from the officers' mess. They were also exempt from work in the afternoon hours so that they could train. In all other respects, they were treated no better than other prisoners and sometimes even harsher, to show them that their athlete status did not carry privileges.

When the Red Army started closing on Auschwitz in January 1945, the remaining prisoners were transferred on foot to Germany. After a three-day long death march the survivors, including Klieger, were sent to the Mittelbau-Dora concentration camp. There he succeeded in fooling the Germans for the second time by pretending to be a precision mechanics expert and was sent to the underground plant producing missiles. On April 4 he was once again sent by foot with the rest of the prisoners to another concentration camp, this time Ravensbruck. This death march took 10 days, but on April 29 Klieger and other Ravensbruck prisoners were freed by the Red Army.

== Journalism career ==
After returning from the camps Klieger started a career as a journalist. As a reporter he covered Nazi criminal trials in Belgium, France, and Germany. In Belgium he reunited with his parents, who also survived Auschwitz; his father Abraham started publishing a German-language magazine for Belgian Jews, and Noah translated articles in this magazine to French.

When Klieger learned about Aliyah Bet, an illegal immigration operation allowing European Jews to come to the Mandatory Palestine, he joined forces with the organizers. In 1947 he became one of the illegal immigrants aboard the ship Exodus 1947, initially as a passenger and later as a crew member. Shortly after he arrived in Mandatory Palestine, the 1947–48 Civil War in Mandatory Palestine started, and he joined the Haganah as a volunteer. In the 1948 Arab–Israeli War he took part in Operation Danny, then was included in the "French commando" squad and finally became a soldier of the Negev Brigade and fought in the South.

After the end of 1948 Arab–Israeli War, Klieger resumed his journalistic career. He became a L’Équipe correspondent in Israel in 1953 and also one of the founders of the first sports section in an Israeli newspaper. From 1957 he was a staff member of the mainstream daily Yedioth Ahronoth for which he also wrote a personal column till the age of 90. In particular, he covered the trials of Adolf Eichmann and Ivan (John) Demjanjuk held in Israel, and frequently published pieces about Holocaust survivors. He continued taking part in the March of the Living, the annual international educational program dedicated to Holocaust history.

== Sports ==
Klieger took a major part in the development of Israeli sports as an executive and administrator. From 1951 to 1968 he served as the chairman of Maccabi Tel-Aviv Basketball Club, and from 1970 to 1998 as the chairman of the Maccabi Ramat-Gan Omni-Sport Club. Klieger was a member of the Maccabi World Union Executive for 14 years. He was also a major fixture in the development of European basketball, participating in FIBA's activities since 1951. He chaired FIBA's media council and the Basketball Commission of Association Internationale de la Presse Sportive for over 25 years and was a press advisor to FIBA's Secretary-General and FIBA Europe Secretary-General.

== Awards and recognition ==
In 2010, Klieger was awarded the FIBA Order of Merit. In 2012 he was awarded the National Order of the Legion of Honor by the French President Nicolas Sarkozy upon the recommendation of the journal L’Équipe, and in 2015 was inducted into the inducted into the FIBA Hall of Fame as a contributor.

Klieger was a recipient of 'L'oeuvre d'une Vie' award from the Journalist's Union and Award for Outstanding and Long-time Sport Activities in Israel (2008), as well as the honorary doctorate by the University of Haifa (2015). He was a recipient of an honorary medal from the City of Strasbourg. In 2016 Klieger was awarded a title of Honorary Freeman by the city of Ramat Gan. His story of survival in the concentration camps has been told in a documentary film Box for Life.

== Death ==
Klieger died on December 13, 2018, after several years of ill health caused by a heart condition. His final column for Yedioth Ahronoth was published on December 11 and commemorated 80 years of that newspaper.
