= Yoshimi Ueda =

Japanese basketball player and administrator

Yoshimi Ueda (植田義巳, Ueda Yoshimi) (June 28, 1906 in Tokyo, Japan – November 9, 1996 in Tokyo, Japan) was a Japanese basketball player and administrator. As a player, he represented Tokyo Shoka University from 1928 to 1934, winning two All-Japanese Championships. He was a member of the Japanese Olympic Committee from 1959, member of the FIBA Central Board (1959–1989) and one of the founders and member of the Central Board of the Asian Basketball Confederation (now FIBA Asia) (1960–1989). In 1994, he was awarded the FIBA Order of Merit. In 2007, he was enshrined as a contributor in the FIBA Hall of Fame.
