= Antonio dos Reis Carneiro =

Brazilian basketball administrator

Antonio dos Reis Carneiro (June 19, 1899 – August 31, 1984) was a Brazilian basketball administrator. He co-founded Brazilian Basketball Federation and Brazilian Basketball Confederation and served as the president of those organizations.

Carneiro was born and died in Brazil. In addition to his work for the Brazilian basketball establishment, he served as president of the South American Commission of FIBA (currently Consubasquet) (1942, 1945–1952), vice-president of FIBA (1948–1952), president of the Brazilian Olympic Committee (1951-) and president of FIBA (1960–1968). He was enshrined in the FIBA Hall of Fame as a contributor in 2007.
