= José Cláudio dos Reis =

Brazilian sports administrator

José Cláudio dos Reis (March 19, 1939 in São Paulo, Brazil – December 29, 1999 in São Paulo, Brazil) was a Brazilian sports administrator.

He served as a director of Corinthians Club (soccer and basketball) (1954–1970), head of delegation for the Brazil national basketball team at the Olympics in 1968, 1972, 1976, 1980, 1984 and 1988 and at the World Championships in 1982, 1986 and 1994, member of the FIBA Central Board (1970–1999) and president of COPABA (Panamerican Basketball Confederation, current FIBA Americas) (1997–1999). He was enshrined in the FIBA Hall of Fame in 2007 as a contributor.
