= Ed Steitz =

American basketball coach and official (1920-1990)

Edward S. Steitz (November 7, 1920 – May 21, 1990) was an American basketball coach and official, working for the National Collegiate Athletic Association (NCAA). He was considered the leading worldwide authority on amateur basketball rules.

== Early life ==
Born in Brooklyn, New York, Steitz was a lived in Beacon, New York. He was a graduate of Cornell University before earning master's and doctoral degrees at Springfield College. After receiving his PhD, he started teaching at Springield in 1948.

== Career ==
=== Coach and athletic director ===
Steitz was the men's basketball coach at Springfield College from 1956 to 1966 and director of athletics from 1956 to 1990.

=== NCAA ===
He worked for the NCAA Men's Basketball Rules Committee as a secretary, editor and national interpreter from 1965 to 1990. He was involved in most of college basketball's major changes over the years, most notably the advent of the 45-second shot clock in 1986 and the introduction of the 3-point field goal in 1987. He was also a longtime member of the NCAA executive committee.

=== International basketball ===
In 1974 he founded and served as a president for Amateur Basketball Association of the United States of America (ABAUSA), now USA Basketball. He was a member of the Technical Commission of FIBA. He was also a member of the United States Olympic Committee's executive committee.

== Honors and awards ==
He was enshrined in the Naismith Memorial Basketball Hall of Fame in 1984. In 2007, he was enshrined as a contributor in the FIBA Hall of Fame.

=== Edward S. Steitz Award ===
USA Basketball's Edward S. Steitz Award was created posthumously in 1991 to recognize an individual for her or his valuable contributions to international basketball.
