= Raimundo Saporta =

Spanish basketball administrator (1926–1997)

Raimundo Saporta Namías (16 December 1926 – 2 February 1997) was a Spanish professional club basketball administrator. After his death, FIBA and Real Madrid renamed both the continental second-tier level FIBA European Cup Winners' Cup and the Pabellón Ciudad Deportiva arena in his honor. Saporta received the Olympic Order 1985. In 1997, he was awarded the FIBA Order of Merit and in 2007, he was enshrined into the FIBA Hall of Fame as a contributor.

== Early life ==
Saporta was born in Paris, to a Jewish family. He attended the Lycée Français de Madrid.

== Basketball executive career ==
Saporta was the head of the basketball section of the multi-sports club Real Madrid, the basketball club Real Madrid Baloncesto (1962–1978, 1985–1991). He also held numerous positions with the International Basketball Federation (FIBA), including President of the Commission for International Organization (1960–onward), President of the Commission for International Competitions (1990–1997), and vice-president (1995–1997).
