= Mario Hopenhaym =

Uruguayan basketball referee

Personal information
- Born: 8 March 1926 Buenos Aires, Argentina
- Died: 7 May 2016 (aged 90)
- Position: Referee
- Officiating career: 1963–1984

Career highlights
- FIBA Order of Merit (2006)
- FIBA Hall of Fame

Mario Hopenhaym (8 March 1926 in Buenos Aires, Argentina – 7 May 2016) was a Uruguayan basketball referee. He refereed international games from 1963 to 1984. Tournaments he worked include 1964 Olympic Games and 1968 Olympic Games, 1967 World Championships, 1971 World Women's Championship and 1975 World Women's Championship. He served as Technical Commissioner in the Olympics in 1992, 1996, 2000, and 2004. In 2006, he was awarded the FIBA Order of Merit. He was enshrined in the FIBA Hall of Fame in 2007.
