= Valentin Lazarov =

Bulgarian basketball referee (1931–2020)

Personal information
- Born: 5 October 1931 Sofia, Bulgaria
- Died: 28 December 2020 (aged 89)
- Position: Referee
- Officiating career: 1950–1983
- FIBA Hall of Fame

Valentin Lazarov (5 October 1931 in Sofia, Bulgaria – 28 December 2020) was a basketball referee and expert, who was enshrined as a technical official in the FIBA Hall of Fame on 19 June 2013.

In addition to his basketball career, Lazarov was also a civil engineer with more than 65 years of experience with projects all over the world. He worked as the general director of the Design Institute of the International Academy of Architecture.

Lazarov was born on 5 October 1931 in Sofia, the capital of Bulgaria, where he lived with his family. He has two daughters and two grandchildren. Valentin Lazarov was an Honorary Citizen of Sofia because of his contributions as a civil engineer. He died on 28 December 2020, aged 89.

== Basketball career ==
Lazarov was enshrined as a technical official in the FIBA Hall of Fame on 19 June 2013.

=== Highlights ===
- Basketball referee from 1950
- FIBA referee (1958–1983)
- Officiated more than 440 international games and finals: FIBA World Championships and European Championships, African Championships, Asian Championships, Korac Cups, Ronchetti Cups, Final Fours, etc.
- Since 1980: FIBA International Instructor, conducted 336 FIBA and other International Clinics for referees, commissioners and instructors in 116 countries
- FIBA Commissioner (1983–2007)
- Member of FIBA Technical Commission since 1976
- Vice-President Technical Commission FIBA Europe (1996–2004)
- Official FIBA Interpreter of the Rules (1992–2005)
- 10 Olympic Games participations
- Author of 2 books on Basketball officiating and more than 20 articles in various sport magazines, Manuals for Commissioners, Manuals for National instructors, etc.
- As a player: basketball team of French College (1946–1949)
- Graduated from 2-year school for talented players (1950–52)
- Captain of the basketball team of the Technical University in Sofia (1949–1954)

=== Distinctions and recognitions ===
- Honorary National Referee in Bulgaria (1958)
- FIBA/FFBA CUP for "BEST REFEREE IN EUROPE" (1962)
- Honorary FIBA referee (1976)
- Golden Whistle as best referee in Bulgaria
- FIBA Cup - "Radomir Shaper" (2000)
- FIBA Basketball Oscar (2002)
- Honorary President of the Bulgarian Referees’ Association (2005)
- FIBA Africa "Äbd-El-Azem Ashry" Cup (2006)
- Honorary Citizen of Sofia
- 6 highest Bulgarian professional awards for his projects/medals

== Civil engineering career ==
For decades, Lazarov was a General Director of Interproject and a Director at the International Academy of Architecture. During his long career, he was responsible for the construction, design, and overall civil plan for embassies, sports facilities and living quarters around the world.

=== Projects ===
- Ministry of Foreign Affairs - Sofia
- Bistrica government residency with covered swimming pool
- Bulgarian Sports Federation building with covered swimming pool
- Belite Brezi residential complex
- 38 residential buildings in Sofia
- Buzludja memorial
- Bulgarian embassy in Kabul, Afghanistan
- Bulgarian embassy in Havanna, Cuba
- Samokov movie theatre
- Rudartsi swimming pool
- Pernik's culture home
- Dimitrovgrad's culture home
- Plovdiv's library
- Koprivshtitsa - 30 houses in the renowned "Bulgarian old style"

==== Municipality of Damascus 1964–1970 ====
Construction and design of numerous sports facilities in the capital of Syria that include:

- Baramke sports complex with halls and football stadium
- Mezze sports complex with covered swimming pool and football field
- Ashrafie sports complex with football field and hotel
- Bulgarian exhibition palace (rewarded with medal)
