= Vladimir Kostin =

Russian basketball referee (1921–1994)

Personal information
- Born: 22 June 1921 Moscow, Russia
- Died: 3 May 1994 (aged 72) Moscow, Russia
- Position: Referee
- Officiating career: 1936–unknown
- FIBA Hall of Fame

Vladimir Mikhailovich Kostin (Russian: Владимир Михайлович Костин, born on 22 June 1921 in Moscow, Russia – 3 May 1994 in Moscow, Russia) was a Russian basketball referee. He has refereed in the 1952 Olympics, 1956 Olympics, 1976 Olympics, 1963 World Championship, 1959 Women's World Championship and many European Championships. In 2007, he was enshrined in the FIBA Hall of Fame.

Though he died in 1994, Kostin's influence endured far beyond his lifetime. In 2007, in recognition of his exceptional contributions to the sport, he was posthumously inducted into the FIBA Hall of Fame as a Technical Official. This prestigious honour cemented his place among the most respected referees in international basketball.
