= August Pitzl =

Austrian basketball player and administrator

August Pitzl (17 December 1920 in Vienna, Austria – 25 January 2000 in Vienna, Austria) was an Austrian basketball player and administrator. As a player, he played in the Austrian league with Union Rudolfsheim from 1946 to 1968. He served as the president of the Austrian Basketball Federation from 1968 to 1986 and treasurer of the FIBA from 1984 to 1994. He also was a director of the Austrian Customs Authority from 1946 to the 1990s. In 1997, he was awarded the FIBA Order of Merit. He was enshrined as a contributor in the FIBA Hall of Fame in 2007.
