= Ervin Kassai =

Hungarian basketball referee

Personal information
- Born: 16 March 1925 Budapest, Hungary
- Died: 12 October 2012 (aged 87)
- Position: Referee
- Officiating career: 1953–1975

Career highlights
- FIBA Order of Merit (1994)
- FIBA Hall of Fame

Ervin Kassai (16 March 1925 – 12 October 2012) was a Hungarian basketball referee.

Kassai was born in Budapest, Hungary. He refereed in international games from 1953 to 1975. He worked the 1960 Olympics (including the final game), 1964 Olympics, 1968 Olympics (including the final game) and 1972 Olympics, 1963 World Championship and 1970 World Championship, eight European Men's Championships, in three European Women's Championships, 5 finals of the European Champions Cup (in 1962, 1966, 1967, 1968 and 1971), 2 finals of the Women's European Champions Cup (in 1959 and 1970) and 1972 final of the European Cup Winners' Cup. He was awarded the FIBA Order of Merit, in 1994. He was enshrined in the FIBA Hall of Fame in 2007.
