= Marian Kozłowski (basketball) =

Polish basketball administrator

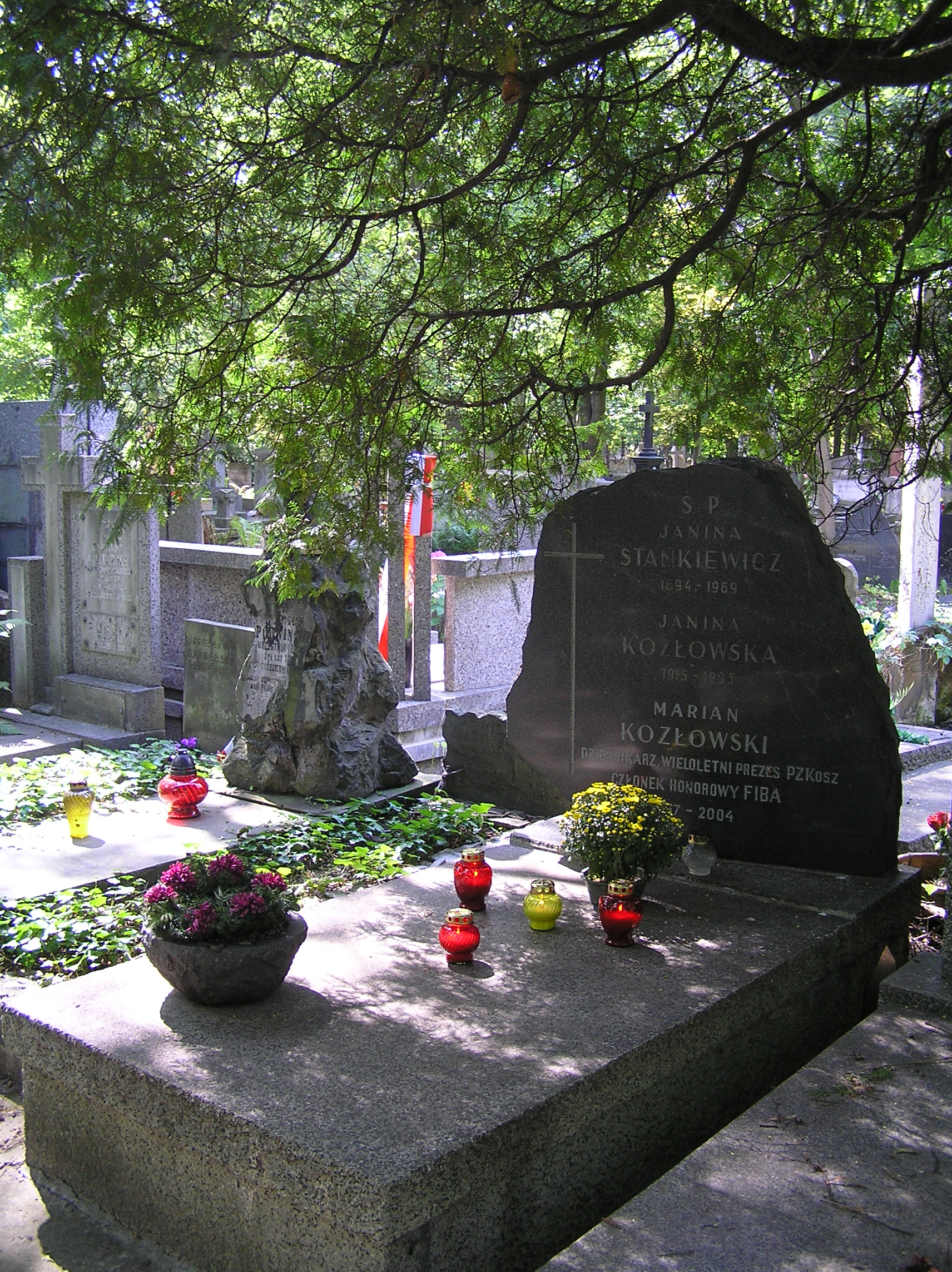
Grave of Marian Kozłowski at Powązki Cemetery in Warsaw

Marian Kozłowski (10 December 1927 in Warsaw, Poland – 15 August 2004 in Warsaw, Poland) was a Polish basketball administrator. He was a journalist, working as a deputy editor of the Express Wieczorny newspaper for many years. He was the president of the Polish Basketball Federation in 1957–1969 and 1980–1984 and the president of the Standing Conference of Europe (current FIBA Europe) in 1982–1990. He also served as vice president of FIBA. In 1996, he was awarded the FIBA Order of Merit. In 2007, he was enshrined as a contributor in the FIBA Hall of Fame.
