= Velayos =

- municipality
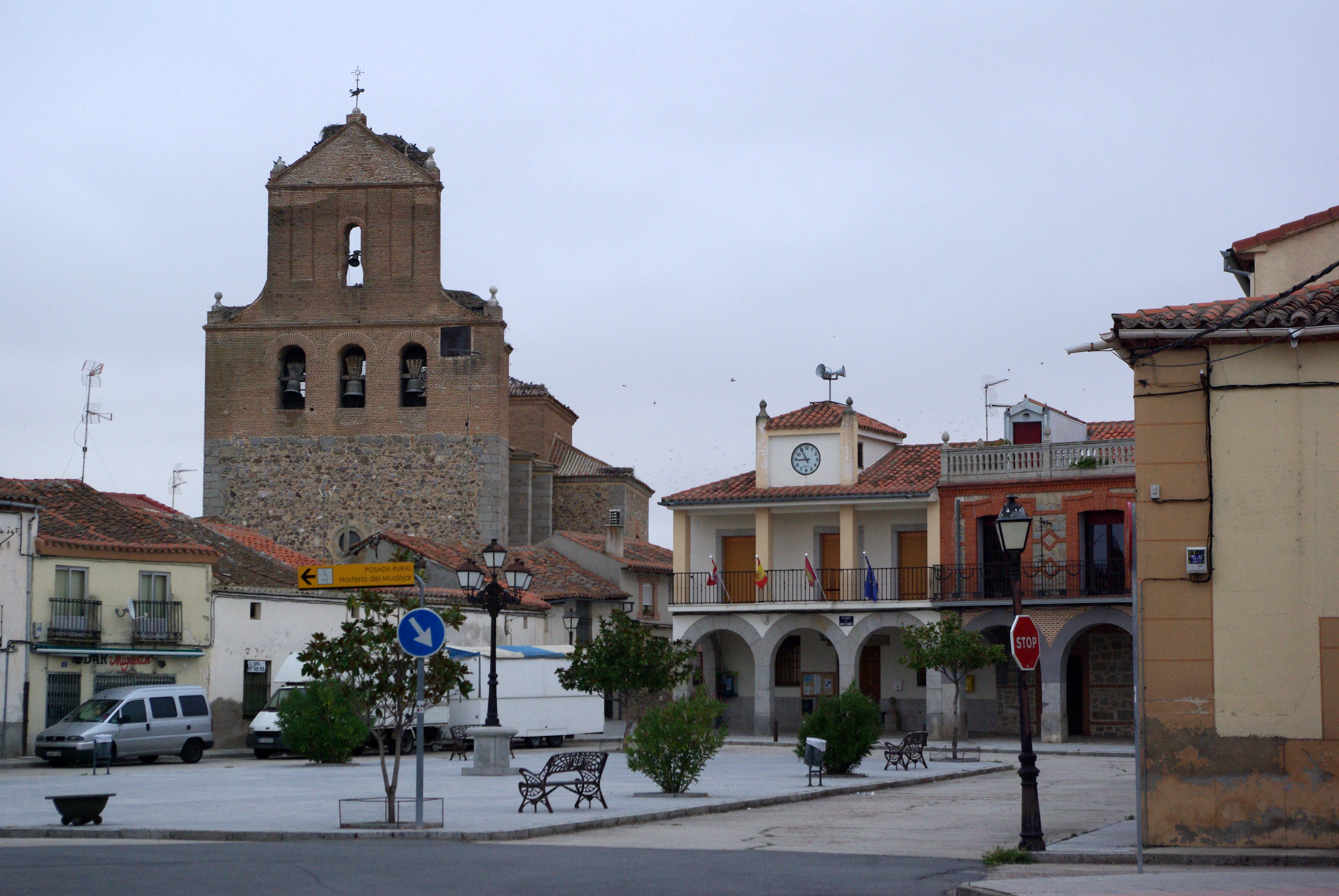

- Flag Coat of arms

- Location in Spain. Velayos (Spain)
- Coordinates: 40°50′30″N 4°37′24″W
- Country: Spain
- Autonomous community: Castile and León
- Province: Ávila
- Municipality: Velayos

Area
  - Total: 20 km^{2} (7.7 sq mi)

Population (2025-01-01)
  - Total: 203
  - Density: 10/km^{2} (26/sq mi)
- Time zone: UTC+1 (CET)
  - Summer (DST): UTC+2 (CEST)
- Website: Official website

Velayos is a municipality located in the province of Ávila, Castile and León, Spain.

== Population ==
Historical population
Year	Pop.	±% p.a.
2023	211	—
2024	217	+2.84%
2025	203	−6.45%
Source: INE
