= Nikolai Semashko (basketball) =

Soviet basketball administrator

Nikolai Vladimirovich Semashko (Cyrillic: Николай Владимирович Семашко; 1907 in the Russian Empire – March 4, 1976 in Moscow, Russian SFSR, Soviet Union) was a Soviet sports administrator. He was the head of the Soviet State Sports Committee (1939–1940 and 1950–1954). He also served as Vice President of the FIBA (1960–1976) and President of the Standing Conference of Europe (current FIBA Europe) (1967–1976). In 2007, he was enshrined as a contributor in the FIBA Hall of Fame.

He is the author of several books on basketball strategy and tactics and also author of technical instructions for player training.

In his career, Semashko was also an international referee, vice-president of FIBA and president of FIBA Europe (before, the Standing Conference of Europe).

The prize for the winning team at EuroBasket is called Nikolai Semashko Trophy.
