= Empire State Games =

Set of annual Olympic-style competitions for New York-based amateur athletes

- Purpose: Sports for working people, Sports for disabled people
- Frequency: Annual
- Inaugurated: Syracuse University 1978
- Most recent: 2010
- Headquarters: New York State Office of Parks, Recreation, and Historic Preservation New York, United States
- Website: www.empirestategames.org

The Empire State Games are a set of annual Olympic-style competitions for amateur athletes from the state of New York, encompassing several divisions and allowing athletes of all ages to compete. It was a member of the National Congress of State Games. The games consisted of a number of competitions:

- Summer Games (often referred to as the Empire State Games, typically held in late July)
- Winter Games (often referred to as the Empire State Winter Games, typically held in February)
- Games for the Physically Challenged (similar to the Paralympics)
- Senior Games (specifically for athletes age 50 and older)

In 2009, 2011, 2012 and 2013 the Empire State Summer Games were cancelled.

== History ==
=== Early history ===
One of the original organizers of the Empire State Games was Herbert Mols of Buffalo, New York. (https://www.youtube.com/watch?v=RU__5V9RAcc0) The first Empire State Games took place at Syracuse University in 1978, the first state games to be held in the United States. The games remained in Syracuse until a delegation from Western New York led by Herb Mols, Bob Rich, Bob Bedell, Carl Roesch Sr., Dr. Marc Grosso, Gardner Debo, Mark Sternin and Ed Rutkowski brought the Games to Buffalo, New York in 1985 and 1986.

With the success of the first 1978 games, the Empire State Games have sparked the creation of other state games across the country. Before their cancellation, the Empire State Games were the largest state-supported amateur athletic competition in the nation.

The Empire State Games competition was a member of the National Congress of State Games, and was a recognized State Games Program of the United States Olympic Committee.

=== Cancellations ===
The 2008 Empire State Games took place from July 23 through July 27, 2008 in Binghamton. The 2009 Empire State Games were cancelled. In 2010 the games were revived and held from July 21 through July 25, 2010 in Buffalo, New York.

Due to a lack of state funding, the 2011 Summer games were discontinued on November 17, 2010. The community of Lake Placid was able to save the winter games.

As for the Games for the Physically Challenged, they were able to be saved with the help of Nassau County Executive Edward P. Mangano and the partnership with dozens of private sector sponsors. A second version of the Empire State Games for the Physically Challenged in Western NY continued at SUNY Brockport College with the aid of corporate sponsors and private funding from Camp Smile Inc., a local not-for-profit organization aligned with the Webster Lions Club and dedicated to providing services to children with disabilities.

=== Return of the games ===
In 2012 Empire State Sports Foundation (ESSF) was created with the specific goal of rejuvenating the Hugh L. Carey Empire State Games for amateur athletes of New York State. ESSF is a Rochester, New York-based not-for-profit public charity dedicated to the recognition and promotion of competitive excellence among New York State’s amateur athletes, as well as those attributes associated with sports: personal health, fitness, development, education, sportsmanship and teamwork.

The Empire State Summer Games were prepared to return in 2013, but as the ESSF were finding corporate partners, they discovered that corporate sponsors had "been giving any extra funds to Hurricane Sandy relief, leaving little extra room for other worthy causes". The Empire State Games are going to be re-launched in Rochester in the summer of 2014.

Upon hearing that The Empire State Summer Games for 2013 was cancelled Nassau County announced that they will hold the 2013 Games for the Physically Challenged as they have done for the last two years. In an April 2013 press conference, Nassau County Executive Edward P. Mangano stated, "The 2013 Games would not have been able to happen without the genius donation of $50,000 US dollars by NBTY, Inc. through their Helping Hands Charity." Known locally as the Nassau County Empire State Games for the Physically Challenged, the 2013 games took place May 30 through June 1.

Meanwhile the Brockport Empire State Games for the Physically Challenged in Monroe County celebrated "36 Years of Abilities" in 2023 with continued private funding from Camp Smile Inc. and local corporate and community support.

=== End of an era ===
According to media reports April 2014, the Empire State Sports Foundation (ESSF), a Brighton, New York nonprofit organization whose aim to revive the popular Olympic-style summer sports event fueled hope among amateur athletes and media attention across the state, official announced its intention to disband. According to the official papers that were made public, filed in New York State Supreme Court, show that the foundation is insolvent, owing debts topping $158,000 to multiple creditors.

== Regions ==
New York State is divided into six regions for the Empire State Games, and each region fields its own athletic teams through tryouts before the games begin.

Regions of the Empire State Games: Adirondack Central / Hudson Valley Long Island / New York City Western

- Adirondack Region
  - Counties: Albany, Clinton, Columbia, Essex, Franklin, Fulton, Greene, Hamilton, Montgomery, Saratoga, Schoharie, Schenectady, St. Lawrence, Rensselaer, Warren, Washington
  - Cities: Albany, Glens Falls, Plattsburgh, Schenectady, Troy
  - Uniform color: gold and blue
- Central Region
  - Counties: Broome, Cayuga, Chemung, Chenango, Cortland, Delaware, Herkimer, Jefferson, Lewis, Madison, Oneida, Onondaga, Oswego, Otsego, Schuyler, Tioga, Tompkins
  - Cities: Binghamton, Elmira, Ithaca, Oswego, Rome, Syracuse, Utica
  - Uniform color: light blue and navy blue
- Hudson Valley Region
  - Counties: Dutchess, Orange, Putnam, Rockland, Sullivan, Ulster, Westchester
  - Cities:Yonkers, Mount Vernon, Middletown, Newburgh, Poughkeepsie, White Plains, New Rochelle
  - Uniform colors: kelly green and gold
- Long Island Region
  - Counties: Nassau, Suffolk
  - Uniform colors: gray and red
- New York City Region
  - Counties: Bronx, Kings (Brooklyn), New York (Manhattan), Queens, Richmond (Staten Island)
  - City: New York City
  - Uniform color: orange and royal blue
- Western Region
  - Counties: Allegany, Cattaraugus, Chautauqua, Erie, Genesee, Livingston, Monroe, Niagara, Ontario, Orleans, Seneca, Steuben, Wayne, Wyoming, Yates
  - Cities: Buffalo, Corning, Niagara Falls, Rochester
  - Uniform color (1978-1994): maroon and white
  - Uniform color (1995-1996): navy blue and light blue
  - Uniform color (1996-2010): navy blue and red

== Summer Games ==
There are three divisions in the Summer Empire State Games: open, scholastic, and masters. The scholastic division is for New York State residents who are 17 or younger as of August 31 of the year of the games. Some scholastic division sports have a minimum age of 13 years. The open division is for New York State residents who are 18 years of age or older as of August 31 of the year of the games. The masters division consists of 11 different sports and their age qualifications vary by sport.

=== Athletic events ===
==== Open and scholastic divisions ====
Open and scholastic events:

- Archery
- Basketball
- Diving
- Fencing
- Gymnastics
- Rowing
- Shooting
- Soccer
- Swimming
- Track and field
- Volleyball
- Wrestling
- Water Polo
- Team Handball

Open only:

- Boxing
- Bowling
- Cycling
- Canoeing
- Kayaking
- Sailing
- Judo
- Softball
- Weightlifting
- Synchronized swimming

Scholastic only:

- Baseball
- Field hockey
- Ice hockey
- Lacrosse
- Tennis

==== Masters division ====
The Masters division competes separately from the open and scholastic divisions, but has many of the same events.

- Archery
- Bowling
- Canoeing
- Cycling
- Diving
- Fencing
- Golf
- Gymnastics
- Rugby
- Swimming
- Volleyball

=== Host sites ===
Locations of host sites.
Adirondack
Central
Hudson Valley
Long Island
New York City
Western

Year	City	Region
1978	Syracuse	Central
1979	Syracuse	Central
1980	Syracuse	Central
1981	Syracuse	Central
1982	Syracuse	Central
1983	Syracuse	Central
1984	Syracuse	Central
1985	Buffalo	Western
1986	Buffalo	Western
1987	Syracuse	Central
1988	Syracuse	Central
1989	Ithaca	Central
1990	Syracuse	Central
1991	Albany	Adirondack
1992	Albany	Adirondack
1993	Rochester	Western
1994	Syracuse	Central
1995	Ithaca	Central
1996	Buffalo	Western
1997	Capital District (Note: The opening ceremonies of the 1997 Empire State Games, hosted by the Capital District, were held in Albany at the University at Albany.)	Adirondack
1998	Rochester	Western
1999	Long Island (Note: The opening ceremonies of the 1999 Empire State Games, hosted by Long Island, were held in Hempstead at Hofstra University.)	Long Island
2000	Binghamton	Central
2001	Mohawk Valley (Note: The opening ceremonies of the 2001 Empire State Games, hosted by the Mohawk Valley, were held in Rome at Rome Free Academy.)	Central
2002	Syracuse	Central
2003	Buffalo	Western
2004	Binghamton	Central
2005	New Paltz	Hudson Valley
2006	Rochester	Western
2007	Westchester County (Note: The opening ceremonies of the 2007 Empire State Games, hosted by Westchester County, were held in Mount Pleasant at the Kensico Dam.)	Hudson Valley
2008	Binghamton	Central
2009	(event cancelled)	
2010	Buffalo	Western
2011	(event cancelled)	
2012	(event cancelled)	
2013	(event cancelled)	
2014	(event cancelled)	Western

Syracuse played host to the first seven of the games, and in total has hosted the Empire State Games 12 times. Other cities hosting multiple times include Buffalo (5 times), Albany, Binghamton and Rochester (3 times each) and Ithaca (2 times). The Central region hosted 15 of the games, followed by Western with eight and the Adirondack region with three. In 2005, the Hudson Valley, which hosted the games twice, became the last region to host the event for the first time. Long Island hosted the games once, in 1999, and New York City never hosted.

== Winter Games ==
The Empire State Winter Games are held annually in Lake Placid in the month of February. Most of the events take place at the venues of the 1980 Winter Olympics.

=== Events ===
- Alpine skiing
- Snowboarding
- Ski cross
- Boardercross
- Biathlon
- Bobsled
- Cross-country skiing
- Curling
- Figure skating
- Ice hockey (women only)
- Luge
- Short track speed skating
- Skeleton
- Ski jumping
- Ski orienteering
- Snowshoe racing
- Speed skating

== Games for the Physically Challenged ==
The Empire State Games for the Physically Challenged is open to athletes between the ages of 5 and 21 in the following divisions: visually impaired, blind, hearing impaired, deaf, spinal cord injury, amputee, cerebral palsy, and les autres (which includes conditions such as muscular dystrophy, dwarfism, and arthritis, among others).

=== Events ===
- Adapted Games
- Archery
- Slalom obstacle course
- Swimming
- Table tennis
- Track and field
- Wheelchair racing
- Wheelchair basketball

== Senior Games ==
The Empire State Senior Games is an organized sports competition and leisure program for those age 50 and older which: Provides recreational opportunities. Encourages fitness as a lifelong activity. Promotes the positive image of seniors. Combines sports and games with fitness, fun and fellowship. Advocates true competition in its purest form.

=== Events ===
- Archery
- Badminton
- Basketball
- Bridge
- Cycling
- Disc golf
- Golf - Long course (par 71)
- Golf - Short course (par 54)
- Horseshoes
- Orienteering
- Pickleball
- Ping Pong (Table Tennis)
- Race Walk (5K)
- Racquetball
- Road Race (5K)
- Road Race (10K)
- Shuffleboard
- Softball
- Swimming
- Tennis
- Track and field
- Triathlon
- Volleyball

== Notable athletes ==
=== Alpine skiing ===
- Diann Roffe, Western

=== Athletics ===
- Derrick Adkins, Long Island
- Dominique Blake, New York City
- Dick Buerkle, Western
- George Buckheit, Hudson Valley
- Diane Dixon, New York City
- Sean Farrell, Long Island
- Samyr Lainé, Hudson Valley
- Paul Lankford, Long Island
- Tom Myslinski, Central
- Jennifer Rhines, Central
- Teresa Vaill, Hudson Valley

=== Baseball ===
- Mike Belfiore, Long Island
- Rob Bell, Hudson Valley
- Clay Bellinger, Central
- Chris Bostick, Western
- Dee Brown, Hudson Valley
- Archi Cianfrocco, Central
- Brian Esposito, New York City
- Zack Granite, New York City
- Jason Grilli, Central
- Brendan Harris, Adirondack
- Tim Hummel, Hudson Valley
- Derek Kinder, Western
- Billy Koch, Long Island
- Johnny Monell, New York City
- Matt Morris, Hudson Valley
- Sean Nolin, Long Island
- Chris O'Grady, Hudson Valley
- Joe Panik, Hudson Valley
- Andy Parrino, Western
- C. J. Riefenhauser, Hudson Valley
- Tim Stauffer, Adirondack
- Marcus Stroman, Long Island

=== Basketball ===
- Kenny Adeleke, New York City
- Antoine Agudio, Long Island
- Curtis Aiken, Western
- Jackie Alemany, Hudson Valley
- Kenny Anderson, New York City
- Yvette Angel, Western
- Ron Artest, New York City
- Kenny Atkinson, Long Island
- Craig Austin, Western
- Adrian Autry, Central
- Erick Barkley, New York City
- Talor Battle, Adirondack
- Rashad Bell, New York City
- David Bernsley, Hudson Valley
- Walter Berry, New York City
- Sue Bird, Long Island
- Brenton Birmingham, Hudson Valley
- Jeremy Bishop, Adirondack
- Ryan Blackwell, Western
- Jason Boone, Hudson Valley
- Elton Brand, Hudson Valley, 1997
- Izett Buchanan, Hudson Valley
- Justin Burrell, New York City
- Rick Carlisle, Adirondack
- Todd Cetnar, Adirondack
- Derrick Chievous, New York City
- Keydren Clark, New York City
- Speedy Claxton, Long Island
- Robert Cornegy, New York City
- Modie Cox, Western
- Ed Davender, New York City
- Marcus Douthit, Central
- Brian Dux, Western
- David Edwards, New York City
- Darren Fenn, Western
- Jeff Foote, Central
- Chris Gedney, Central
- Anthony Glover, New York City
- Ben Gordon, Hudson Valley
- Lindsay Gottlieb, Hudson Valley
- Tyrone Grant, New York City
- Sidney Green, New York City
- Justin Greene, New York City
- Ricardo Greer, New York City
- Ray Hall, Western
- Kashif Hameed, Hudson Valley
- Boo Harvey, New York City
- Drew Henderson, Western
- Otis Hill, Hudson Valley
- Kevin Houston, Hudson Valley
- Royal Ivey, New York City
- Mark Jackson, New York City
- Charles Jenkins, Long Island
- Cindy Johnson, New York City
- Shenise Johnson, Western
- Mark Jones, Western
- Mookie Jones, Hudson Valley
- Shelton Jones, New York City
- Antoine Jordan, Adirondack
- Nicole Kaczmarski, Long Island
- Tariq Kirksay, New York City
- Christian Laettner, Western
- Sylven Landesberg, New York City
- Dorsey Levens, Central
- Felipe López, New York City
- Chris Lowe, Hudson Valley
- Carmen Maciariello, Adirondack
- Anthony Mason Jr., New York City
- Rosalee Mason, New York City
- Kyle McAlarney, New York City
- Rodney McCray, Hudson Valley
- Conrad McRae, New York City
- Darryl Middleton, New York City
- Nakiea Miller, Hudson Valley
- Chris Mullin, New York City
- Drew Nicholas, Long Island
- Tim O'Toole, Hudson Valley
- Sam Perkins, New York City
- Darren Phillip, New York City
- Ed Pinckney, New York City
- Tammi Reiss, Hudson Valley
- King Rice, Central
- Norman Richardson, Long Island
- Ron Rowan, New York City
- Trevor Ruffin, Western
- David Russell, Long Island
- Levell Sanders, New York City
- Kenny Satterfield, New York City
- Lazarus Sims, Central
- Kaseem Sinceno, Hudson Valley
- Kenny Smith, New York City
- Terry Smith, Central
- Rod Strickland, New York City
- Wally Szczerbiak, Long Island
- Ron Torgalski, Western, Central
- Edwin Ubiles, Hudson Valley
- Andy Van Slyke, Central
- John Wallace, Western
- Dwayne Washington, New York City
- Jay Washington, Hudson Valley
- Bill Wennington, Long Island
- Chaz Williams, New York City
- Tim Winn, Western
- Craig Wise, Western

=== Biathlon ===
- Curt Schreiner, Adirondack

=== Bowling ===
- Liz Johnson, Western
- Mike Mullin, Hudson Valley

=== Boxing ===
- Michael Bentt, New York City
- Hector Camacho, New York City
- Howard Davis Jr., Long Island
- Gabriel Hernández, Hudson Valley
- Darling Jimenez, Hudson Valley
- Buddy McGirt, Long Island
- Joe Mesi, Western
- Charles Murray, Western
- Mike Tyson, New York City
- Hasim Rahman

=== Canoeing ===
- Curt Schreiner, Adirondack

=== Cross-country skiing ===
- Curt Schreiner, Adirondack

=== Cycling ===
- Megan Guarnier, Adirondack
- George Hincapie, Long Island
- Mike McCarthy, New York City
- Nelson Vails, New York City

=== Diving ===
- Cassandra Cardinell, Adirondack

=== Fencing ===
- Cliff Bayer, New York City
- Peter Devine, New York City
- Ed Wright, Hudson Valley
- Felicia Zimmermann, Western

=== Field hockey ===
- Tracey Fuchs, Long Island
- Melissa González, Hudson Valley
- Jill Reeve, Adirondack
- Carla Tagliente, Central

=== Gymnastics ===
- Mark Caso, Central
- Dom Minicucci, New York City

=== Ice hockey ===
- Kevyn Adams, Western
- Dylan Blujus, Western
- Jesse Boulerice, Adirondack
- Rich Brennan, Adirondack
- Dustin Brown, Central
- Erik Burgdoerfer, Long Island
- Patrick Cannone, Long Island
- Peter Ciavaglia, Western
- Olivia Coffey, Central
- Erik Cole, Central
- Tim Connolly, Central
- Craig Conroy, Adirondack
- Craig Darby, Adirondack
- Mike Dunham, Central
- Robert Esche, Central
- Jeff Farkas, Western
- Chris Ferraro, Long Island
- Peter Ferraro, Long Island
- Stephen Gionta, Western
- Bobby Goepfert, Long Island
- Mark Green, Central
- Jason Guerriero, Long Island
- Sean Haggerty, Hudson Valley
- Matt Herr, Hudson Valley
- Chris Higgins, Long Island
- Jimmy Howard, Adirondack
- Alex Iafallo, Western
- Emily Janiga, Western
- Patrick Kane, Western
- Tim Kennedy, Western
- Keith Kinkaid, Long Island
- Doug Knight, Hudson Valley
- Les Kuntar, Western
- David Leggio, Western
- Caitlin Lever, Western
- Todd Marchant, Western
- Wade Megan, Adirondack
- Kevin Mitchell, Long Island
- Matt Murley, Central
- Boo Nieves, Central
- Eric Nystrom, Long Island
- Emily Pfalzer, Western
- Andrew Poturalski, Western
- Josephine Pucci, Hudson Valley
- Peter Ratchuk, Western
- Brian Roloff, Western
- Cole Schneider, Western
- Rob Schremp, Central
- Rob Scuderi, Long Island
- Tim Sestito, Central
- Shane Sims, Western
- Lee Stempniak, Western
- Alex Trezza, Hudson Valley
- Ryan Vesce, Long Island
- Lyndsay Wall, Western, 2001
- Derek Whitmore, Western
- Steven Zalewski, Central

=== Judo ===
- Nina Cutro-Kelly, Adirondack
- Jason Morris, Adirondack

=== Lacrosse ===
- Melvin Fowler, Long Island
- Jon Hess, Hudson Valley
- Pat McCabe, Long Island
- Mark Millon, Long Island
- Kenny Nims, Central
- Stephen Peyser, Long Island
- Casey Powell, Central
- Ryan Powell, Central
- Todd Sauerbrun, Long Island
- Peter Trombino, Long Island
- John Zulberti, Central

=== Rowing ===
- Patrick Manning, Hudson Valley
- Tom Murray, Western
- Brett Wilkinson, Hudson Valley
- Kyle Winter, Hudson Valley

=== Shooting ===
- Jason Turner, Western

=== Skeleton ===
- Jimmy Shea, Adirondack
- Gary Wozniak, Los Gatos, CA

=== Soccer ===
- Dario Brose, Hudson Valley
- Betsy Drambour, Adirondack
- Gary Flood, Long Island
- Eddie Hawkins, Hudson Valley
- Godwin Iwelumo, Central
- Miles Joseph, Adirondack
- Danny Kelly, Hudson Valley
- Jerrod Laventure, Long Island
- Joe Papaleo, Central
- Abby Wambach, Western
- John Wolyniec, New York City

=== Swimming ===
- Kim Black, Central
- Kara Lynn Joyce, Western
- John Witchel, New York City

=== Team handball ===
- Dom Minicucci, New York City

=== Wrestling ===
- Jeff Blatnick, Adirondack
- Kyle Dake, Central
- Frank Famiano, Adirondack
- Jason Gleasman, Central
- Tim Green, Central
- Morlon Greenwood, Long Island
- Gene Mills, Central
