= List of results of the United States men's basketball team at the Olympics =

The following is a list of results of the United States men's basketball team at the Summer Olympics:

== 1936 Summer Olympics ==
Game #	Opponent	Result	Point differential	Round	Notes	Ref.
1936 Summer Olympics (Berlin)
Game 1	Spain	W 2–0	--	First Round	Spain forfeited; USA credited with 2–0 victory	
Game 2	Estonia	W 52–28	+24	Second Round		
Game 3	Philippines	W 56–23	+33	Fourth Round		
Game 4	Mexico	W 25–10	+15	Semifinals		
Game 5	Canada	W 19–8	+11	Gold Medal Final	USA wins gold medal	
Tournament totals: 5–0 record; 38 points per game; +20.8 average point differential

== 1948 Summer Olympics ==
Game #	Opponent	Result	Point differential	Round	Notes	Ref.
1948 Summer Olympics (London)
Game 1	Switzerland	W 86–21	+65	Group Play		
Game 2	Czechoslovakia	W 53–28	+25	Group Play		
Game 3	Argentina	W 59–57	+2	Group Play		
Game 4	Egypt	W 66–28	+38	Group Play		
Game 5	Peru	W 61–33	+28	Group Play		
Game 6	Uruguay	W 63–28	+35	Quarterfinals		
Game 7	Mexico	W 71–40	+31	Semifinals		
Game 8	France	W 65–21	+44	Gold Medal Final	USA wins gold medal (2)	
Tournament totals: 8–0 record; 65.5 points per game; +33.5 average point differential

== 1952 Summer Olympics ==
Game #	Opponent	Result	Point differential	Round	Notes	Ref.
1952 Summer Olympics (Helsinki)
Game 1	Hungary	W 66–48	+18	Preliminary Group Play		
Game 2	Czechoslovakia	W 72–47	+25	Preliminary Group Play		
Game 3	Uruguay	W 57–44	+13	Preliminary Group Play		
Game 4	USSR	W 86–58	+28	Quarterfinal Group Play		
Game 5	Chile	W 103–55	+48	Quarterfinal Group Play		
Game 6	Brazil	W 57–53	+4	Quarterfinal Group Play		
Game 7	Argentina	W 85–76	+9	Semifinals		
Game 8	USSR	W 36–25	+11	Gold Medal Final	USA wins gold medal (3)	
Tournament totals: 8–0 record; 70.3 points per game; +19.5 average point differential

== 1956 Summer Olympics ==
Game #	Opponent	Result	Point differential	Round	Notes	Ref.
1956 Summer Olympics (Melbourne)
Game 1	Japan	W 98–40	+58	Preliminary Group Play		
Game 2	Thailand	W 101–29	+72	Preliminary Group Play	Second largest USA margin of victory in Olympic competition	
Game 3	Philippines	W 121–53	+68	Preliminary Group Play	Tied for third largest USA margin of victory in Olympic competition	
Game 4	Bulgaria	W 85–44	+41	Quarterfinal Group Play		
Game 5	Brazil	W 113–51	+62	Quarterfinal Group Play		
Game 6	USSR	W 85–55	+30	Quarterfinal Group Play		
Game 7	Uruguay	W 101–38	+63	Semifinals		
Game 8	USSR	W 89–55	+34	Gold Medal Final	USA wins gold medal (4)	
Tournament totals: 8–0 record; 99.1 points per game; +53.5 average point differential

== 1960 Summer Olympics ==
Game #	Opponent	Result	Point differential	Round	Notes	Ref.
1960 Summer Olympics (Rome)
Game 1	Italy	W 88–54	+34	Preliminary Group Play		
Game 2	Japan	W 125–66	+59	Preliminary Group Play		
Game 3	Hungary	W 107–63	+44	Preliminary Group Play		
Game 4	Yugoslavia	W 104–42	+62	Semifinal Group Play		
Game 5	Uruguay	W 108–50	+58	Semifinal Group Play		
Game 6	USSR	W 81–57	+24	Semifinal Group Play		
Game 7	Italy	W 112–81	+31	Medal Group Play		
Game 8	Brazil	W 90–63	+27	Medal Group Play	USA wins gold medal (5)	
Tournament totals: 8–0 record; 101.9 points per game; +42.4 average point differential

== 1964 Summer Olympics ==
Game #	Opponent	Result	Point differential	Round	Notes	Ref.
1964 Summer Olympics (Tokyo)
Game 1	Australia	W 78–45	+33	Group Play		
Game 2	Finland	W 77–51	+26	Group Play		
Game 3	Peru	W 60–45	+15	Group Play		
Game 4	Uruguay	W 83–28	+55	Group Play		
Game 5	Yugoslavia	W 69–61	+8	Group Play		
Game 6	Brazil	W 86–53	+33	Group Play		
Game 7	South Korea	W 116–50	+66	Group Play		
Game 8	Puerto Rico	W 62–42	+20	Semifinals		
Game 9	USSR	W 73–59	+14	Gold Medal Final	USA wins gold medal (6)	
Tournament totals: 9–0 record; 78.2 points per game; +30 average point differential

== 1968 Summer Olympics ==
Game #	Opponent	Result	Point differential	Round	Notes	Ref.
1968 Summer Olympics (Mexico City)
Game 1	Spain	W 81–46	+35	Group Play		
Game 2	Senegal	W 93–36	+57	Group Play		
Game 3	Philippines	W 96–75	+21	Group Play		
Game 4	Yugoslavia	W 73–58	+15	Group Play		
Game 5	Panama	W 95–60	+35	Group Play		
Game 6	Italy	W 100–61	+39	Group Play		
Game 7	Puerto Rico	W 61–56	+5	Group Play		
Game 8	Brazil	W 75–63	+12	Semifinals		
Game 9	Yugoslavia	W 65–50	+15	Gold Medal Final	USA wins gold medal (7)	
Tournament totals: 9–0 record; 82.1; +26 average point differential

== 1972 Summer Olympics ==
Game #	Opponent	Result	Point differential	Round	Notes	Ref.
1972 Summer Olympics (Munich)
Game 1	Czechoslovakia	W 66–35	+31	Group Play		
Game 2	Australia	W 81–55	+26	Group Play		
Game 3	Cuba	W 67–48	+19	Group Play		
Game 4	Brazil	W 61–54	+7	Group Play		
Game 5	Egypt	W 96–31	+65	Group Play		
Game 6	Spain	W 72–56	+16	Group Play		
Game 7	Japan	W 99–33	+66	Group Play		
Game 8	Italy	W 68–38	+30	Semifinals		
Game 9	USSR	L 50–51	-1	Gold Medal Final	USA suffers first loss in Olympic competition; wins silver medal	
Tournament totals: 8–1 record; 73.3; +28.8 average point differential

== 1976 Summer Olympics ==
Game #	Opponent	Result	Point differential	Round	Notes	Ref.
1976 Summer Olympics (Montreal)
Game 1	Italy	W 106–86	+20	Group Play		
Game 2	Yugoslavia	W 95–74	+21	Group Play		
Game 3	Puerto Rico	W 95–94	+1	Group Play	Smallest USA margin of victory in Olympic competition	
Game 4	Yugoslavia	W 112–93	+19	Group Play		
Game 5	Egypt	W 2–0	--	Group Play	Egypt forfeited; USA credited with 2-0 victory	
Game 6	Czechoslovakia	W 81–76	+5	Semifinals		
Game 7	Canada	W 95–77	+18	Gold Medal Final	USA wins gold medal (8)	
Tournament totals: 7–0 record; 97.3 points per game; +14 average point differential

== 1980 Summer Olympics ==
Game #	Opponent	Result	Point differential	Round	Notes	Ref.
1980 Summer Olympics (Moscow)
USA qualified for Olympic tournament but did not participate due to 1980 Summer Olympics boycott

== 1984 Summer Olympics ==
Game #	Opponent	Result	Point differential	Round	Notes	Ref.
1984 Summer Olympics (Los Angeles)
Game 1	China	W 97–49	+48	Group Play		
Game 2	Canada	W 89–68	+21	Group Play		
Game 3	Uruguay	W 104–68	+36	Group Play		
Game 4	France	W 120–62	+58	Group Play		
Game 5	Spain	W 101–68	+33	Group Play		
Game 6	F. R. Germany	W 78–67	+11	Quarterfinals		
Game 7	Canada	W 78–59	+19	Semifinals		
Game 8	Spain	W 96–65	+31	Gold Medal Final	USA wins gold medal (9)	
Tournament totals: 8–0 record; 95.4 points per game; +32.1 average point differential

== 1988 Summer Olympics ==
Game #	Opponent	Result	Point differential	Round	Notes	Ref.
1988 Summer Olympics (Seoul)
Game 1	Spain	W 97–53	+44	Group Play		
Game 2	Canada	W 76–70	+6	Group Play		
Game 3	Brazil	W 102–87	+15	Group Play		
Game 4	China	W 108–57	+51	Group Play		
Game 5	Egypt	W 102–35	+67	Group Play		
Game 6	Puerto Rico	W 94–57	+37	Quarterfinals		
Game 7	USSR	L 76–82	-6	Semifinals	USA suffers second loss in Olympic competition	
Game 8	Australia	W 78–49	+29	Bronze Medal Final	USA wins bronze medal	
Tournament totals: 7–1 record; 91.6 points per game; +30.375 average point differential

== 1992 Summer Olympics ==
Game #	Opponent	Result	Point differential	Round	Notes	Ref.
1992 Summer Olympics (Barcelona)
Game 1	Angola	W 116–48	+68	Group Play	Tied for third largest USA margin of victory in Olympic competition	
Game 2	Croatia	W 103–70	+33	Group Play		
Game 3	Germany	W 111–68	+43	Group Play		
Game 4	Brazil	W 127–83	+44	Group Play		
Game 5	Spain	W 122–81	+41	Group Play		
Game 6	Puerto Rico	W 115–77	+38	Quarterfinals		
Game 7	Lithuania	W 127–76	+51	Semifinals		
Game 8	Croatia	W 117–85	+32	Gold Medal Final	USA wins gold medal (10)	
Tournament totals: 8–0 record; 117.3 points per game; +43.8 average point differential

== 1996 Summer Olympics ==
Game #	Opponent	Result	Point differential	Round	Notes	Ref.
1996 Summer Olympics (Atlanta)
Game 1	Argentina	W 96–68	+28	Group Play		
Game 2	Angola	W 87–54	+33	Group Play		
Game 3	Lithuania	W 104–82	+22	Group Play		
Game 4	China	W 133–70	+63	Group Play		
Game 5	Croatia	W 101–71	+30	Group Play		
Game 6	Brazil	W 98–75	+23	Quarterfinals		
Game 7	Australia	W 101–73	+28	Semifinals		
Game 8	Yugoslavia	W 95–69	+26	Gold Medal Final	USA wins gold medal (11)	
Tournament totals: 8–0 record; 102 points per game; +31.6 average point differential

== 2000 Summer Olympics ==
Game #	Opponent	Result	Point differential	Round	Notes	Ref.
2000 Summer Olympics (Sydney)
Game 1	China	W 119–72	+47	Group Play		
Game 2	Italy	W 93–61	+32	Group Play		
Game 3	Lithuania	W 85–76	+9	Group Play		
Game 4	New Zealand	W 102–56	+46	Group Play		
Game 5	France	W 106–94	+12	Group Play		
Game 6	Russia	W 85–70	+15	Quarterfinals		
Game 7	Lithuania	W 85–83	+2	Semifinals		
Game 8	France	W 85–75	+10	Gold Medal Final	USA wins gold medal (12)	
Tournament totals: 8–0 record; 95 points per game; +21.6 average point differential

== 2004 Summer Olympics ==
Game #	Opponent	Result	Point differential	Round	Notes	Ref.
2004 Summer Olympics (Athens)
Game 1	Puerto Rico	L 73–92	-19	Group Play	USA suffers third and biggest loss in Olympic competition	
Game 2	Greece	W 77–71	+6	Group Play		
Game 3	Australia	W 89–79	+10	Group Play		
Game 4	Lithuania	L 90–94	-4	Group Play	USA suffers fourth loss in Olympic competition	
Game 5	Angola	W 89–53	+36	Group Play		
Game 6	Spain	W 102–94	+8	Quarterfinals		
Game 7	Argentina	L 81–89	-8	Semifinals	USA suffers fifth loss in Olympic competition	
Game 8	Lithuania	W 104–96	+8	Bronze Medal Final	USA wins bronze medal (2)	
Tournament totals: 5–3 record; 88.1 points per game; +4.6 average point differential

== 2008 Summer Olympics ==
Game #	Opponent	Result	Point differential	Round	Notes	Ref.
2008 Summer Olympics (Beijing)
Game 1	China	W 101–70	+31	Group Play		
Game 2	Angola	W 97–76	+21	Group Play		
Game 3	Greece	W 92–69	+23	Group Play		
Game 4	Spain	W 119–82	+37	Group Play		
Game 5	Germany	W 106–57	+49	Group Play		
Game 6	Australia	W 116–85	+31	Quarterfinals		
Game 7	Argentina	W 101–81	+20	Semifinals		
Game 8	Spain	W 118–107	+11	Gold Medal Final	USA wins gold medal (13)	
Tournament totals: 8–0 record; 106.3 points per game; +27.9 average point differential

== 2012 Summer Olympics ==
Game #	Opponent	Result	Point differential	Round	Notes	Ref.
2012 Summer Olympics (London)
Game 1	France	W 98–71	+27	Group Play		
Game 2	Tunisia	W 110-63	+47	Group Play		
Game 3	Nigeria	W 156–73	+83	Group Play	Largest USA margin of victory in Olympic competition	
Game 4	Lithuania	W 99-94	+5	Group Play		
Game 5	Argentina	W 126-97	+29	Group Play		
Game 6	Australia	W 119–86	+33	Quarterfinals		
Game 7	Argentina	W 109-83	+26	Semifinals		
Game 8	Spain	W 107-100	+7	Gold Medal Final	USA wins gold medal (14)	
Tournament totals: 8–0 record; 115.5 points per game; +32.1 average point differential

== 2016 Summer Olympics ==
Game #	Opponent	Result	Point differential	Round	Notes	Ref.
2016 Summer Olympics (Rio de Janeiro)
Game 1	China	W 119–62	+57	Group Play		
Game 2	Venezuela	W 113–69	+44	Group Play		
Game 3	Australia	W 98–88	+10	Group Play		
Game 4	Serbia	W 94–91	+3	Group Play		
Game 5	France	W 100–97	+3	Group Play		
Game 6	Argentina	W 105–78	+27	Quarterfinals		
Game 7	Spain	W 82–76	+6	Semifinals		
Game 8	Serbia	W 96–66	+30	Gold Medal Final	USA wins gold medal (15)	
Tournament totals: 8–0 record; 100.9 points per game; +22.5 average point differential

== 2020 Summer Olympics ==
Game #	Opponent	Result	Point differential	Round	Notes	Ref.
2020 Summer Olympics (Tokyo)
Game 1	France	L 76–83	-7	Group Play	USA suffers sixth loss in Olympic competition	
Game 2	Iran	W 120–66	+54	Group Play		
Game 3	Czech Republic	W 119–84	+35	Group Play		
Game 4	Spain	W 95–81	+14	Quarterfinals		
Game 5	Australia	W 97–78	+19	Semifinals		
Game 6	France	W 87–82	+5	Gold Medal Final	USA wins gold medal (16)	
Tournament totals: 5–1 record; 99 points per game; +20 average point differential

== 2024 Summer Olympics ==
Game #	Opponent	Result	Point differential	Round	Notes	Ref.
2024 Summer Olympics (Paris)
Game 1	Serbia	W 110–84	+26	Group Play		
Game 2	South Sudan	W 103–86	+17	Group Play		
Game 3	Puerto Rico	W 104–83	+21	Group Play		
Game 4	Brazil	W 122–87	+35	Quarterfinals		
Game 5	Serbia	W 95–91	+4	Semifinals	USA overcame the largest points deficit (-17) to win in Olympic competition	
Game 6	France	W 98–87	+11	Gold Medal Final	USA wins gold medal (17)	
Tournament totals: 6–0 record; 105.3 points per game; +19 average point differential

== See also ==
- List of results of the United States women's basketball team at the Olympics
