= Impact of the COVID-19 pandemic on American sports broadcasting =

When the World Health Organization declared the COVID-19 pandemic in March 2020, all major professional and collegiate organizations responded by suspending operations indefinitely. This effect was passed down to the world of sports broadcasting, which includes live coverage of thousands of events on an annual basis through stations and network available over the air, through cable, satellite, and IPTV companies, and via streaming and over-the-top services.

== Coverage on March 11 and 12 ==
The game on March 11 between the Utah Jazz and the Oklahoma City Thunder which was scrapped when Rudy Gobert tested positive for COVID-19 was to have been shown on AT&T SportsNet Rocky Mountain, Fox Sports Oklahoma, and NBA League Pass. Minutes later, the NBA announced that the season would be put on hold, but that the rest of the night's games would be played as scheduled. ESPN was covering the Denver Nuggets-Dallas Mavericks game; upon hearing the news, ESPN courtside reporter Rachel Nichols interviewed, and got reaction from, Mavericks owner Mark Cuban. That was the first of two scheduled games on ESPN that night. The second was to be New Orleans Pelicans versus the Sacramento Kings; however, that game was postponed when it was discovered that one of the referees scheduled to work the game had a similar assignment on a game earlier in the week in which the Jazz was one of the teams playing. ESPN responded by adding an edition of SportsCenter recapping the night's events.

On March 12, various TV channels and streaming services had planned to cover various conference tournaments in college basketball, The Players Championship on the PGA Tour, various NBA and NHL games, Major League Baseball spring training games, and other sports events. Of those, only the PLAYERS, the first half of a quarterfinal game in the Big East Conference tournament, and the spring training games in Florida (one of which was shown by MLB Network) went off as scheduled.

Once all events were scrapped, ESPN extended SportsCenter to an all-day live program, while ESPN2 aired some of that show as well as some simulcast content from ESPN Radio. ESPNU and Fox Sports 1 re-aired basketball games from earlier in the season, NBCSN elevated its coverage of the Mecum Auto Auctions show in Kissimmee, Florida from an exclusive stream, and Big Ten Network and SEC Network extended their studio programming.

== First weekend after shutdown ==
- On March 13, the college basketball tournament games on Friday were replaced on ESPN by SportsCenter, Get Up!, and First Take, by ESPN2 with the 30 for 30 episodes about the Celtics–Lakers rivalry, by ESPNU and Fox Sports 1 by re-airs of games from earlier in the season, on B1G by docuseries, and on SECN by a re-air of the 2019 SEC Championship Game. Golf Channel re-aired the second round of the 2019 Players Championship, and FS1 replaced the canceled NASCAR Cup Series session from Atlanta Motor Speedway with a replay of the 2019 Folds of Honor QuikTrip 500.
- On March 14, ABC showed other episodes of 30 for 30 and replaced a scheduled NBA telecast on the night on March 14 with reruns of American Idol and Shark Tank. CBS, which was to show the Big Ten Conference semifinals, instead showed the 2018 title game. NBC re-aired the third round of the 2019 PLAYERS, and FOX returned its scheduled time to the affiliates, including a rerun of The Masked Singer that night in part of what was supposed to be the Big East title game's time slot. ESPN elevated UFC Fight Night: Lee vs. Oliveira from ESPN+, while ESPN2 showed the documentary Basketball: A Love Story.
- On March 15, CBS affiliates programmed the hour which had been set aside for the announcement of the men's basketball tournament field, after the network had shown the 2019 Big Ten title game. FOX also returned airtime to its local stations after the Folds of Honor QuikTrip 500 was postponed. Meanwhile, ABC re-aired Game 6 of the 2008 NBA Finals, NBC the final round of the 2019 PLAYERS, and ESPN had another marathon of 30 for 30. NBCSN, which was to show the IndyCar Grand Prix of St. Petersburg, instead re-aired the 2019 Indianapolis 500. FS1 reran the previous week's XFL and MLS matches.
- Throughout the weekend, Tennis Channel re-aired its coverage of the 2019 BNP Paribas Open, as the 2020 edition had already been canceled.
- There were only three live sporting events on major U.S. networks that weekend. FS1 had two of them: the PBA World Series of Bowling and an Australian Football League game. As mentioned, the other was the UFC Fight Night card on ESPN.

== Long-term replacement plans ==
Previously to the pandemic, the last extended shutdown of most major U.S. sports was in response to the September 11 attacks; however, in that case, those leagues in season returned within two weeks. As it would take far longer for sports organizations to return this time, networks and channels on all levels had to scramble to find, or create, alternative programming. These eventual plans fell into four basic categories:

=== Telecasts of available events ===
Even before most organizations returned, some sporadic live programming was available to air on some channels.

- Thoroughbred horse racing continued at most U.S. race tracks, so FS1 expanded its America's Day at the Races series and NBCSN reached a deal with TVG Network to simulcast its programming.
- ESPN reached a deal with the Korea Baseball Organization to air the games of the KBO League live for its 2020 season. The announcers were ESPN talent such as Karl Ravech, Jon Sciambi, Eduardo Pérez, and Tim Kurkjian, who called the action off-monitor from ESPN headquarters in Bristol, Connecticut.
- ESPN also aired the American Cornhole League on weekend afternoons, although some of that coverage may have been planned before the pandemic.
- ESPN showed the entry drafts of the WNBA on April 17 and the NFL from April 23 through April 25. Both drafts were virtual, with ESPN's studio being the hub of each telecast. NFL Network canceled its usual separate feed and instead aired ESPN's; NFLN draft host Rich Eisen instead hosted a "Draft-a-thon" that aired on NFL.com and various social media channels.
- On May 9, the preliminary fights to UFC 249 returned TV coverage of that league to ESPN. This was followed by FOX's telecast of a live NASCAR Cup Series race from Darlington Raceway on May 17, the same day as the TaylorMade Driving Relief charity event that was on NBC, NBCSN, and Golf and a Professional Bull Riders event on CBS. On May 24, Woods and Peyton Manning faced off against Mickelson and Tom Brady in The Match: Champions for Charity which aired on TBS, TNT, truTV, and HLN.
- The PGA Tour also returned before either the NBA, NHL, or MLB, as the Charles Schwab Challenge took place from June 11 to June 14; the tournament was shown on Golf Channel and CBS.

=== Re-airs of prior events ===
==== Television ====
- CBS replaced its planned coverage of the 2020 NCAA Division I men's basketball tournament with re-airs of its network daytime programs in the afternoons, primetime reruns on weekday nights, and past NCAA tournament games on weekends. TBS, TNT, and truTV (the other partners in the coverage partnership) aired movies and other alternate programs. Time slots for postponed PGA Tour tournaments were replaced by the same events from 2019. In place of the 2020 Masters Tournament, which would eventually be held in November, CBS reran the 2004 final round on April 11 and the 2019 final round on April 12. Integrated into the re-airs were remote interviews with the respective winners, Phil Mickelson and Tiger Woods.
- NBC and Golf Channel continued to re-air PGA Tour events from the previous year to replace postponed events. On May 2, when the Kentucky Derby was supposed to take place, NBC aired a virtual race with the 13 horses that had won the Triple Crown of Thoroughbred Racing as of that time. "Bets" were placed on each horse, with proceeds going to charities providing COVID-19 pandemic relief. Secretariat was the winner. On that date - as well as the pre-scheduled dates of the Preakness Stakes and Belmont Stakes - the same races from 2015 (the year American Pharoah won) were re-shown. NBC also re-aired past NHL games in some afternoon time slots in place of the previously scheduled live games.
- ESPN settled on a "game of the week" pattern, in which Monday Night Football games would air on Mondays, MLB game re-airs were on Tuesdays, previous NBA games on Wednesdays, and college football re-airs came on Thursdays. Other re-airs included old versions of the Scripps National Spelling Bee and the Little League World Series - neither of which would be held in 2020 - as well as three past episodes of WrestleMania and a cycling competition using Peloton stationary bicycles.
- Shows on ESPN2 included marathons of tennis matches, championship boxing matches, and Major League Soccer.
- Fox Sports started a new series called Greatest Games/Greatest Races with re-airs of MLB and NFL games, as well as NASCAR races. FOX offered these on a syndicated basis to its affiliates, which could choose to air all, some, or none of them. These also aired on FS1. By mid-April, it also had a "game of the week" format: College football on Monday, WWE shows on Tuesday, "Wednesday Night Showdown" (virtual short-track auto racing) on Wednesdays, and NFL games on Thursdays. Fridays after horse racing, FS1 aired re-runs of This Week in Baseball, sports movies, and Texas hold 'em poker. Starting in June, reruns of the 1989 roller derby series RollerGames joined the lineup on weekends.
- NBCSN launched weeklong marathons of past games and other programs in primetime. Those included Sunday Night Football re-airs, past Super Bowls, Stanley Cup playoff games, the Summer Olympics, auto racing from NASCAR and IndyCar, "From the Vault" (a variety of sports), and even episodes of Saturday Night Live hosted by athletes. In addition, NBCSN aired "Hockey Happy Hour" from 5:00 p.m. to 7:00 p.m. Eastern time each Monday through Thursday, with game re-airs, long-form interviews, and special programming from NHL.com. On Saturdays, NBCSN aired edited game replays and interstitial programs from the Premier League. In May and June, coverage of the 2020 French Open (which would eventually be held in the fall) was replaced by past championship matches, while later in June, coverage of the 2020 Tour de France (which would eventually be held in August and September) was supplanted by "The Ultimate Tour," re-airs of past stages.
- MLB Network rebroadcast dozens of games under the title All-Time Games and also launched a new program MLB Network Game of the Week. It also incorporated some films, such as Field of Dreams, Bull Durham, and The Naked Gun: From the Files of Police Squad!. On March 26, MLB Network joined with FS1, MLB.com and social platforms for a daylong event called "MLB Opening Day at Home."
- NBA TV aired both traditional rebroadcasts and other versions with virtual panel discussions and enhanced information on-screen (the latter inspired by Pop Up Video).
- NHL Network re-aired its Raising the Cup series (Stanley Cup-clinching games) as well as other past NHL contests.
- CBS Sports Network also re-aired old NCAA tournament games in place of rebroadcasts from 2020. In April, it re-aired a number of NFL games that had originally aired on CBS Sports.
- Regional sports networks also went with telecasts of past games for the most part. For example, NESN aired Boston Bruins games in the afternoon and Boston Red Sox games in the evenings, while Fox Sports Southwest carried games from the Dallas Mavericks, Dallas Stars, and Texas Rangers.

==== Radio ====
- Westwood One re-aired men's college basketball and NFL games.
- St. Louis Cardinals flagship station KMOX re-aired every game from its 2011 championship run, from August 25 (when they were 10½ games behind the wild-card spot in the National League) to their win in Game 7 of the World Series.
- WFAN radio re-aired selected New York Mets, New York Yankees, and New York Giants games.
- KIRO re-aired Seattle Mariners games and the 2001 Major League Baseball All-Star Game throughout the month of April.
- Local sports radio stations carried more long-form interviews and even added non-sports and pop culture content to fill air time usually devoted to live broadcasts.

=== Virtual/esports competitions ===
Every major sports organization used esports in some way during this period when real competition was suspended. In addition, some existing esports platforms received elevated coverage.

The most popular single esports event was the eNASCAR iRacing Pro Invitational Series, which took place on simulated versions of tracks on which NASCAR had planned to compete prior to postponement. The April 5 race, set at Texas Motor Speedway, drew an audience of 1.339 million on FS1 and many FOX affiliates, making it the most-watched video-game competition show in U.S. television history. It broke the record of 903,000 set two weeks earlier for the race set at Homestead–Miami Speedway. The series earned a renewal for a second season in 2021 and is credited by some for an increased interest in NASCAR, as evidenced by increased in-person attendance and TV audiences for races run since NASCAR resumed.

NBC, the other partner in carrying NASCAR Cup Series races, also teamed up with iRacing; this was a four-race series that took place between April 6 and April 9.

Elsewhere in motorsports:

- Formula 1 ran a series called "And We Race On" using the tracks from their postponed races, most notably the Monaco Grand Prix; races were shown on its worldwide broadcast partners including ESPN.
- IndyCar conducted the INDYCAR iRacing Challenge, which was a six-race miniseries; some of the tracks they raced at were on the current schedule, while others were not. All races streamed on IndyCar.com and social media channels, while the last five races also aired on NBCSN.
- NBCSN and AMA Supercross came together to organize a virtual motorcycle race set at Angel Stadium of Anaheim, which held several races earlier in the season before the pandemic but would be left off the 2021 schedule.
- On Saturdays, ESPN aired The Race All-Star Series, on which sports cars competed in simulated races at tracks around the world.
- On Wednesday nights, FS1 simulated races using sprint cars and those that were used in the defunct International Race of Champions; the races used the iRacing platform. Mario Andretti was a guest commentator on one of the episodes.

MLB and the Major League Baseball Players Association organized the MLB The Show 20 Players League. Pitcher Blake Snell, then of the Tampa Bay Rays, won the final match which was shown May 3 on ESPN.

The NHL staged a tournament with 32, two-person teams, one for each club in the league (including the Seattle Kraken, which had not only yet to play a game at this point, but had not even announced its nickname). The platform was EA Sports' NHL 20. NBCSN had occasional broadcasts as part of "Hockey Happy Hour," while the entire tourney streamed on NHL.com.

The Madden NFL franchise received elevated coverage on ESPN of its invitational and tournament of champions, and added a celebrity tournament that aired on FS1.

The NBA2K League season, which normally is an exclusive stream on Twitch and sometimes on ESPN3, aired on Friday nights on ESPN2 in the late spring. Before that, 16 NBA players competed on the NBA 2K game in a single-elimination bracket format, with ESPN and ESPN2 televising. Another elevated telecast was the League of Legends Spring Split Playoffs, which landed on ESPN2.

MLS held a tournament with 16, two-person teams; each team consisted of an MLS player and a professional video gamer representing a different side in the league. FS1 showed this event on Sunday nights, when actual MLS games would normally air. The Premier League also staged an esports tournament, with players from all 20 clubs participating in a single-elimination format; the final was shown on NBCSN in the U.S. after preliminary rounds were streamed on NBCSports.com.

Video-game simulations of games that were scheduled, but canceled due to the pandemic, aired on NBC Sports Philadelphia, NBC Sports Washington, and on KMVP-FM in Phoenix, Arizona.

=== Documentaries, features, and specials ===
ESPN persuaded the producers of The Last Dance, a documentary covering the 1997–98 Chicago Bulls season, to expedite post-production so the show could debut on April 19 in place of Sunday Night Baseball. The 10-part series averaged 6.71 million viewers, making it the most-watched non-sports program in ESPN history. Discussion about the documentary trailed only NFL off-season news among topics discussed on sports radio in the days after the docuseries ended. ESPN also re-aired episodes of 30 for 30 and ESPN Films throughout the shutdown, including many weekends on ABC.

After The Last Dance, ESPN aired two new episodes of 30 for 30 - "Lance" (about cyclist Lance Armstrong) and "Like Water" (about martial artist and actor Bruce Lee) on later Sunday nights.

On June 15, ESPN aired a two-hour series of interviews with commissioners of major professional sports leagues for a SportsCenter special hosted by Mike Greenberg.

Other outlets produced features to fill content holes until resumption of play.

- ESPN ran a 64-player bracketed tournament to determine the best individual player in college basketball history; a fan vote would determine the winner of each matchup. The player announcement took place on March 19 and the final "match" took place on March 31.
- ESPN revived its "The Ocho" stunt of offbeat sporting events twice during the shutdown. The first time was on March 22, airing on ESPN2, and the second time was on May 2, airing on ESPN. (The name originated in the film Dodgeball: A True Underdog Story; the associated stunt normally airs on or about August 8 (8/8, "ocho" in Spanish.))
- Also on ESPN was an eight-player, single-elimination tournament using the playground basketball game H-O-R-S-E. Mark Jones was the play-by-play announcer.
- NHL.com had a number of series, including Hat Trick Trivia, Skates and Plates, and Who Wore It Best?. These also aired on NBCSN and NHL Network.
- MLB.com organized two virtual tournaments honoring the history of MLB; both were called "Dream Bracket." In the first, all-star teams were selected for all 30 franchises and were joined by teams representing stars of the Negro leagues and players aged 25 and under to complete a 32-team bracket. In the second, 64 intact teams - all of which had played from the 1946 to the 2019 seasons, except for some Negro league teams - were selected. In both cases, games were simulated using the Out of the Park 21 program and all rounds were best-of-7 series. The Yankees defeated the Cincinnati Reds in the final of the first tournament, while the 1986 New York Mets defeated the 2001 Seattle Mariners in the final of the second tournament.

TV networks also took advantage of special competitions conducted in some sports. Tennis Channel aired the Ultimate Tennis Showdown, the Adria Tour, and other exhibitions, while AT&T SportsNet Southwest carried the Constellation Energy League, a rare example of a professional league outside of MLB that actually played.

== Impact on studio programming ==
The following chart shows what studio programming were affected, what - if anything - replaced it, and when the shows returned. Even upon resumption, all of part of production was done remotely through at least summer in most cases.

Network	Show	Date suspended	Date returned	Notes
ESPN	Around the Horn	March 16	July 13	ATH was a segment on SportsCenter from April 13 to May 8 and a 20-minute show from May 11 to July 10. PTI was a segment on SportsCenter from March 30 to July 10. HQ and Jalen & Jacoby were 20-minute shows from May 8 to July 10.
ESPN	Pardon the Interruption	March 16	July 13	ATH was a segment on SportsCenter from April 13 to May 8 and a 20-minute show from May 11 to July 10. PTI was a segment on SportsCenter from March 30 to July 10. HQ and Jalen & Jacoby were 20-minute shows from May 8 to July 10.
ESPN	Highly Questionable	March 16	July 13	ATH was a segment on SportsCenter from April 13 to May 8 and a 20-minute show from May 11 to July 10. PTI was a segment on SportsCenter from March 30 to July 10. HQ and Jalen & Jacoby were 20-minute shows from May 8 to July 10.
ESPN	Jalen & Jacoby	March 16	July 13	ATH was a segment on SportsCenter from April 13 to May 8 and a 20-minute show from May 11 to July 10. PTI was a segment on SportsCenter from March 30 to July 10. HQ and Jalen & Jacoby were 20-minute shows from May 8 to July 10.
ESPN	ESPN Daily Wager	March 16	Sep. 8	The show's return was also the debut of its new studio at The Linq on the Las Vegas Strip.
ESPN	High Noon	March 16	never	This show was canceled by ESPN and was not part of the return to full studio programming.
Fox Sports 1 (Note: At first, these talk shows were replaced by re-broadcasts of various sporting events.)	The Herd with Colin Cowherd	March 16	March 18	This program, a simulcast with iHeart Radio was moved from Fox Sports in Los Angeles to iHeart in Burbank, California and was available only on radio. Fox amended the plan after Tom Brady unexpectedly signed with the Tampa Bay Buccaneers as a free agent on March 17. At that point, the simulcast was restored as iHeart rigged a TV camera in the Burbank facility. The show returned to L.A. on May 27.
Fox Sports 1	Undisputed with Skip and Shannon	March 16	March 23	There had been nighttime editions from March 18 to March 20 before the return to its usual daytime slot.
Fox Sports 1	First Things First	March 16	March 23	
Fox Sports 1	Speak for Yourself	March 16	March 23	
Fox Sports 1	NASCAR Race Hub	March 16	March 30	Returned with remote production as the studio remained closed
NBCSN	Pro Football Talk	March 16	March 23	This program had been replaced by Sky Sports News, which ran for six hours a day that week.
NBCSN	Lunch Talk Live with Mike Tirico	N/A	N/A	These shows were added to the NBCSN schedule. Lunch Talk Live began on April 6 and ran through June 12. Flex began on April 13 and ended sometime in June.
NBCSN	NBC Sports Football Flex	N/A	N/A	These shows were added to the NBCSN schedule. Lunch Talk Live began on April 6 and ran through June 12. Flex began on April 13 and ended sometime in June.
NBCSN	The Rich Eisen Show	N/A	August 17	This audio simulcast from iHeart was also added to the schedule and removed after the July 10 episode as the Premier League resumed play; however, it came back to NBCSN, only to sign off again on October 2. On October 5, the video feed was moved to Peacock, joining The Dan Patrick Show; both had been on Audience prior to that channel signing off.
MLB Network	MLB Tonight	March 18	July 20	This program aired live at 6 p.m. Eastern time on March 16 and 17, then Mondays, Wednesdays, and Fridays until the MLB season began.
MLB Network	MLB Central	N/A	July 20	These shows were on hiatus during spring training, but were to have resumed on March 26. During the break, they were available only on MLB.com and the organization's social media platforms.
MLB Network	MLB Now	N/A	July 20	These shows were on hiatus during spring training, but were to have resumed on March 26. During the break, they were available only on MLB.com and the organization's social media platforms.
MLB Network	Intentional Talk	N/A	July 20	These shows were on hiatus during spring training, but were to have resumed on March 26. During the break, they were available only on MLB.com and the organization's social media platforms.
NHL Network	NHL Tonight	March 18	mid-July	This program aired live at 7 p.m. Eastern time on March 16 and 17, then Tuesdays and Thursdays until teams reported to "hub cities" for the 2020 Stanley Cup playoffs.
NHL Network	NHL Now	March 16	mid-July	This show was available only on NHL.com and on the league's social media platforms.
NBA TV	NBA GameTime	March 16	March 30	When this show returned, it was done entirely via remote until the NBA returned in mid-July.
NFL Network	NFL Total Access	March 16	early August	This program remained on the air, but the main studio in Culver City, California shut down, with anchors at either a backstage set or the newsroom. At some undetermined point, even those were closed and episodes done remotely.
NFL Network	Good Morning Football	March 16	April 13	The Embassy Row studio in lower Manhattan from which this show originated did not reopen until November 9.
Golf Channel	Golf Central	March 16	April 20	These programs resumed with remote production; the studios in Orlando, Florida remained closed.
Golf Channel	Morning Drive	March 16	April 20	These programs resumed with remote production; the studios in Orlando, Florida remained closed.

Tennis Channel kept its studio open for the entire hiatus of major tours, except for one week in April. Tennis Channel Live had news updates and hosted the All-Star Fantasy Tournament, a virtual competition in which the results were determined by fan vote and supplemented by archival footage.

ESPN Radio and CBS Sports Network maintained their talk lineups, but all shows (except for the Jim Rome Show on CBS SN and CBS Sports Radio) were done remotely.

== Response to George Floyd protests ==
Some new content was added by sports networks in response to the George Floyd protests that began at the end of May:

- On June 1, ESPN re-aired a panel discussion from 2016 on how sports organizations and athletes should deal with police brutality.
- On Juneteenth (June 19), MLBN and NHLN aired separate editions of MLB Tonight and NHL Tonight, each called "A Conversation." Both shows had Black hosts and panelists discussing racial issues.

== Coverage of sports events after resumption ==
Members of the sports media had to abide by the same health and safety protocols that governed athletes and officials in the sports they covered. They were banned from entering team locker rooms (a rule that continued into most sports as of April 2022), and access to other areas of their training and practice facilities were severely limited, thereby affecting their broadcast preparations. In addition, sports leagues and organizations limited the number of media, including announcers and production personnel, allowed at each site.

ESPN and TNT sent all of their game announcers and sideline reporters to the 2020 NBA Bubble at ESPN Wide World of Sports Complex in Bay Lake, Florida. Play-by-play and color analysts were required to remain separated by Plexiglas structures and reporters had to conduct interviews based on social distancing. Local broadcasters did not travel with their teams; instead, they called games off-monitor at either studio facilities or from their homes. When the NHL resumed play in the "hub cities" of Edmonton and Toronto, all Sportsnet/CBC announcers were on-site, but only some of the NBC/NBCSN commentators traveled. Lead announcer Mike Emrick called games from his home in suburban Detroit and other games were called off-monitor at NBC Sports studios in Stamford, Connecticut. Announcers also called the WNBA and MLS bubble events (at, respectively, IMG Academy and ESPN WWOS) from remote locations.

Production for these telecasts were modified due to the pandemic protocols. Technical crews used more cameras in different locations than usual, while large-scale video walls were installed in locations close to the field of play to replace actual crowds. (The most elaborate and perhaps the best example of the video setup was WWE ThunderDome, which was in three locations in Florida from August 2020 to July 2021.) On-site audio was also enhanced, mostly with artificial crowd noise. Fox Sports also experimented with "crowds" using computer-generated imagery at some MLB games and had planned further use for the NFL and college football, but those plans would later be aborted. In addition, multiple sites were used for production, rather than the single on-site location that prevailed before the pandemic. Examples:

- The overall production of Super Bowl LV was overseen from the CBS Broadcast Center in midtown Manhattan rather than Raymond James Stadium in Tampa, Florida.
- FOX's NASCAR race telecasts included announcers in Charlotte, North Carolina, a limited production staff at the tracks, and additional crew members at Fox Broadcasting Company in the Century City neighborhood of Los Angeles.

MLB chose to keep home-and-road schedules with no bubbles until the postseason. In those cases, only one broadcast feed was available; if a game was shown by FOX/FS1 or ESPN, it was the host feed; otherwise, it was maintained by the home team. Only the home announcers were on-site; everyone else was remote, including all FOX/FS1 or ESPN announcers. During the Wild Card Series, TBS sent Rich Waltz and Jimmy Rollins to Tropicana Field in St. Petersburg, Florida for the series between the Toronto Blue Jays and the Tampa Bay Rays, while all seven of the series shown on ESPN were still called remotely. For remaining postseason rounds, held in modified bubbles (Los Angeles and San Diego in California, and Arlington and Houston in Texas), all commentators and reporters were on-site.

All event commentary at the 2022 Winter Olympics in Beijing was conducted off-site in Stamford due to strict protocols imposed by the government of China; only some reporters and studio hosts were on-site. NBC also altered an earlier plan to have Tirico travel from Beijing to NBC's coverage of Super Bowl LVI in Inglewood, California and back; instead, after the Los Angeles Rams defeated the Cincinnati Bengals, Tirico hosted the rest of the Games in primetime from the NBC Sports studio.

== Financial impact ==
Due to a conflict between the new date of the U.S. Open golf tournament and the NFL season, the United States Golf Association asked Fox Sports to move coverage of the event to FS1. When Fox refused, the USGA invalidated the contract that was supposed to expire in 2026 and replaced it with a new, eight-year deal with NBC Sports that took effect immediately.

As a direct result of the pandemic - and the inability to sell ads for live sports events that were not played - Diamond Sports Group, the joint venture of Sinclair Broadcast Group and Entertainment Studios that bought Fox Sports Networks after The Walt Disney Company, which had acquired it, had to divest in 2019 - took a $4.23-billion write-off on the purchase in November 2020 of the RSNs. The RSNs were renamed Bally Sports on March 31, 2021. Diamond filed for Chapter 11 bankruptcy on March 13, 2023, then the channels changed their name to FanDuel Sports Network on October 21, 2024. The exit from bankruptcy was expected after MLB dropped its final objection in November of 2024.

While NBCSN closed on December 31, 2021 in the wake of revenue losses from the postponed 2020 Summer Olympics and other lost or rescheduled events, NBC Sports did not directly cite the pandemic as the cause. NBC Sports later announced that the U.S. version of the Olympic Channel would shut down on September 30, 2022.

ESPN laid off 300 employees and decided to leave 200 other positions vacant.

== Subsequent and present uses ==
=== Program rescheduling ===
- In the fall of 2021, NESN moved the weekday blocks of Bruins and Red Sox games to NESN+; Bruins games re-aired in early afternoon and Red Sox games in late afternoon.
- Networks and stations had to continue to scramble for replacement programming during frequent postponements and cancellations throughout the pandemic, with a peak coming during the spread of the Omicron variant. Alternate games aired wherever possible; if not, it was reverted to the late spring/early summer 2020 pattern. ESPNU replaced many of the lost time slots with re-airs of episodes of College Football 150, which premiered on ESPN during the 150th anniversary season of college football in 2019.
  - Some situations involving the NFL were handled differently. In the 2020 season, a game between the Baltimore Ravens and the Pittsburgh Steelers was postponed three times and was finally played on December 2; when it occurred, KWQC-TV, the local NBC affiliate in the Quad Cities, chose not to show the game. Six days later, the Steelers played a rescheduled game against the Washington Football Team; FOX did not show the game on all affiliates despite that game being played on Monday afternoon unopposed. In contrast, when games between the Washington Football Team and the Philadelphia Eagles and the Seattle Seahawks and the Los Angeles Rams were postponed from December 19 to December 21 in the 2021 season, FOX - which showed both games - presented the telecasts on a split-regional basis on all its stations. Also, in October 2020, the telecast of a game between the Denver Broncos and the New England Patriots was moved from CBS to ESPN and back, as the game was rescheduled twice. (ESPN had planned to send Chris Fowler, Kirk Herbstreit, and Laura Rutledge to Gillette Stadium when the game was to have been shown on that channel.)
- The 2021 Pro Bowl was played in a virtual format using the Madden NFL 21 video game, as the actual game was canceled. Teams were composed of current NFL players and celebrities, and the simulation was shown on NFL Network. Before the simulation, ABC and ESPN simulcast a two-hour special recognizing the players that were chosen as the best in the AFC and NFC that season.
- During the 2021–22 Major League Baseball lockout, MLB Network reverted to a schedule similar to that earlier in the pandemic by showing vintage games during the day and movies at night; that was because images of active players could not be used.
- On April 4, 2022, FS1 replayed Game 6 of the 1977 World Series in which Reggie Jackson hit a postseason record-tying three home runs; a live MLB game had been scheduled but was not played due to a delay in the start of the season resulting from the lockout.

=== Commentator changes ===
- Some NFL games experienced announcer changes due to positive COVID-19 tests. CBS lead analyst Tony Romo contributed to the network's telecasts of Week 17 of the 2020 regular season and that season's wild card game between the Chicago Bears and New Orleans Saints from his home, while during the 2021 season, Fox announcer Kevin Burkhardt and ESPN sideline reporter Lisa Salters missed games.
- ESPN lead college football analyst Kirk Herbstreit tested positive just before the Rose Bowl game, which was a semifinal as part of the 2020 College Football Playoff; he stayed at home in Nashville, Tennessee and joined the telecast remotely. ESPN also changed a number of assignments during its coverage of the following bowl season; in one example, Jesse Palmer was sidelined from the inaugural LA Bowl; Palmer, also host of The Bachelor and The Bachelorette, was to have been joined in the booth by Joe Tessitore, who is also the co-host of Holey Moley, for the game supported by Jimmy Kimmel, host of Jimmy Kimmel Live! (all four are series on ABC).
- During the spring of 2022, ESPN had to alter its announcer assignments for several major league sports when a number of them tested positive for COVID-19. Among those who had to miss games were Mike Breen and Jeff Van Gundy (NBA), Sean McDonough (NHL), and Karl Ravech (MLB). In September, Bob Costas missed one telecast each on MLB Network and TBS after a positive test.
- Several announcers for MLB teams also were forced to take time off during the 2022 season, including Los Angeles Dodgers radio announcers Jaime Jarrín and Charley Steiner, Cleveland Guardians play-by-play announcer Matt Underwood, and New York Mets field reporter Steve Gelbs.
- In 2023, Minnesota Twins play-by-play announcer Dick Bremer went into isolation after testing positive for COVID-19; as a result, he did not call the home opening game for the first time since 1983. On August 9 and 10, hall of fame pitcher and MASN commentator Jim Palmer missed the Houston Astros–Baltimore Orioles games after contracting the virus. Two other MASN announcers missed the same games, but whether or not they were held out due to contact tracing, scheduled time off, or in solidarity to the suspended colleague Kevin Brown is not known.
- During a new surge of COVID-19 cases, ESPN game analyst David Cone missed the Sunday Night Baseball game between the Boston Red Sox and New York Yankees on July 7, 2024. Cone made a guest appearance by telephone, but connection issues forced him off the air early in the game.

=== Program archives ===
- Some of the programs introduced by NHL.com during the pause were made available for rebroadcast on the NHL's free ad-supported streaming television channel, which debuted on NHL.com and The Roku Channel in December 2022. In addition, a documentary set during the 2020 Stanley Cup playoffs, Inside the Bubble, was added to the program lineup.
- Fox Sports' "Greatest Games" and "Greatest Races" series are available on-demand on Tubi. In addition, a new edition of "Greatest Games" was shown on FS1 on January 27, 2023, two days before the 2022 NFC Championship Game between the San Francisco 49ers and the Philadelphia Eagles. It was a college football game between Iowa State and Oklahoma in which the Sooners won 42-41; the respective starting quarterbacks, Brock Purdy and Jalen Hurts, would also square off in the NFC title game playing for, respectively, the 49ers and Eagles.

=== Other uses ===
Fox Sports revived the use of artificial crowd noise on June 17, 2023, when the audio portion failed during its telecast of the Los Angeles Angels versus the Kansas City Royals. It was in place when Samad Taylor had a walk-off double for the 10-9 win for the Royals.
