= Claire Hallissey =

British long-distance runner

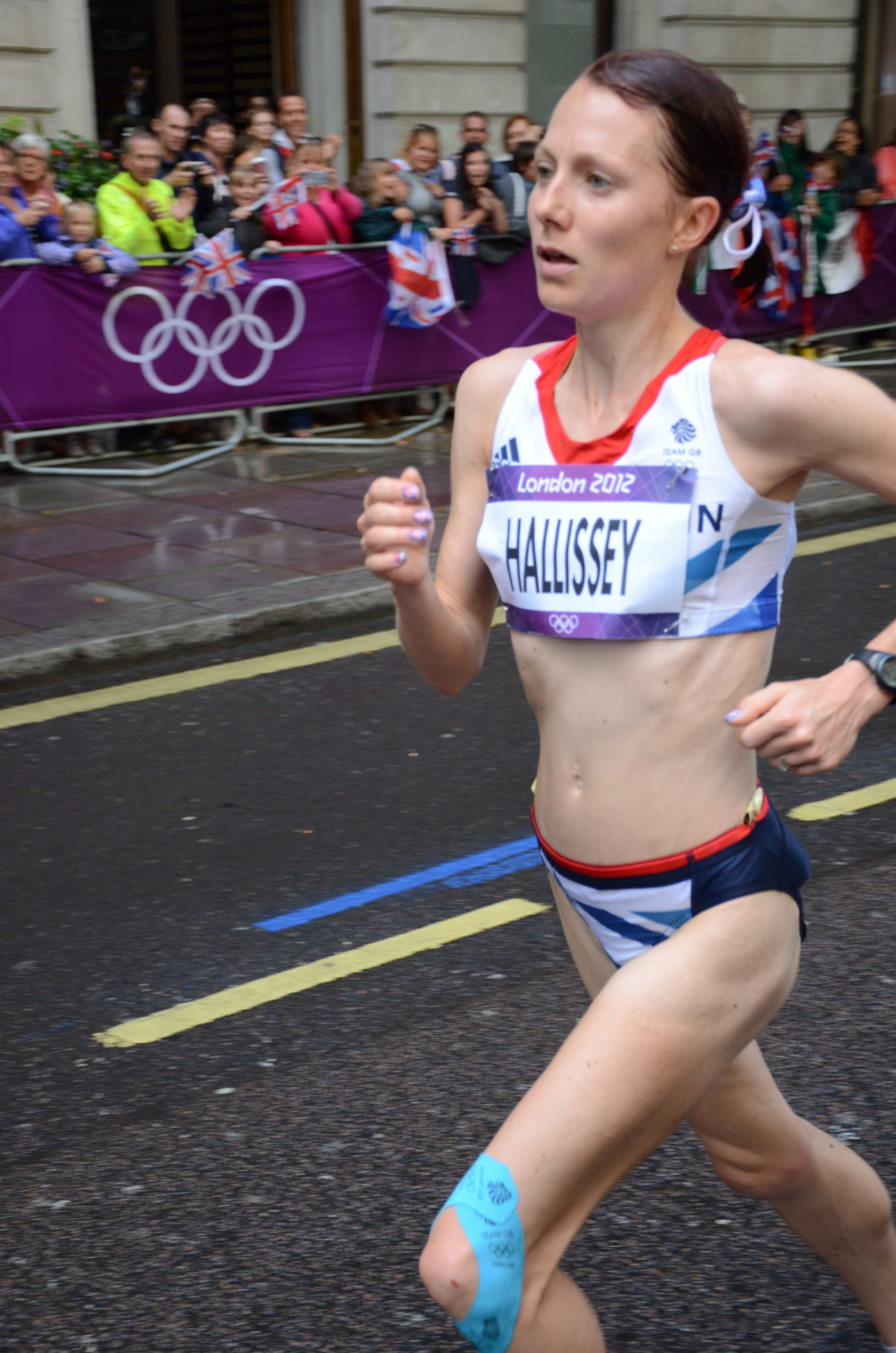
- Hallissey during the women's marathon at the 2012 Summer Olympics

Personal information
- Nationality: English; British
- Born: 17 March 1983 (age 43) Watford, Hertfordshire, England
- Height: 1.64 m (5 ft 4 1/2 in)
- Weight: 48 kg (106 lb) (2012)

Sport
- Events: 10,000 metres, half marathon, marathon
- Club: Capital Area Runners; DC Road Runners Club; Bristol & West AC

Achievements and titles
- Personal bests: Half marathon: 1:12:02; Marathon: 2:27:44
- Updated on 5 November 2015

Claire Hallissey is a British distance runner. She competed for Britain at the 2009 World Half Marathon Championships coming 25th. In 2010, she ran her first marathon, in New York and in 2011 ran the Chicago Marathon. In 2012, she finished 11th in the London Marathon.

Hallissey was confirmed as a member of the Great Britain squad for the 2012 Summer Olympics in the women's marathon alongside compatriots Paula Radcliffe and Mara Yamauchi. She finished in 57th place in a time of 2:35:39.

== Running career ==
Hallissey first began running at the age of 11. She made her first international appearance at the 2009 European Cup 10,000m race. She made a gradual transition to longer-distance races, and finished in 24th overall at the 2009 IAAF World Half Marathon Championships. In 2010, she moved with her husband to Arlington, Virginia, and went on to win several road races in the DC metropolitan area. Upon moving to the United States, she was first coached by George Buckheit from CAR. She was still able to run internationally in the UK national singlet, as she qualified for the 2010 IAAF World Half Marathon Championships and placed 18th overall. She qualified for the marathon in the 2012 Summer Olympics when she finished the 2012 London Marathon, held in April the same year, in a personal best time of 2:27:44. In 2014, she raced in the DCRRC singlet when she won the 2014 Maryland-D.C. Road Runners 10-Mile Club Championship.
