= 1972 Olympic men's basketball final =

Disputed match between the US and USSR

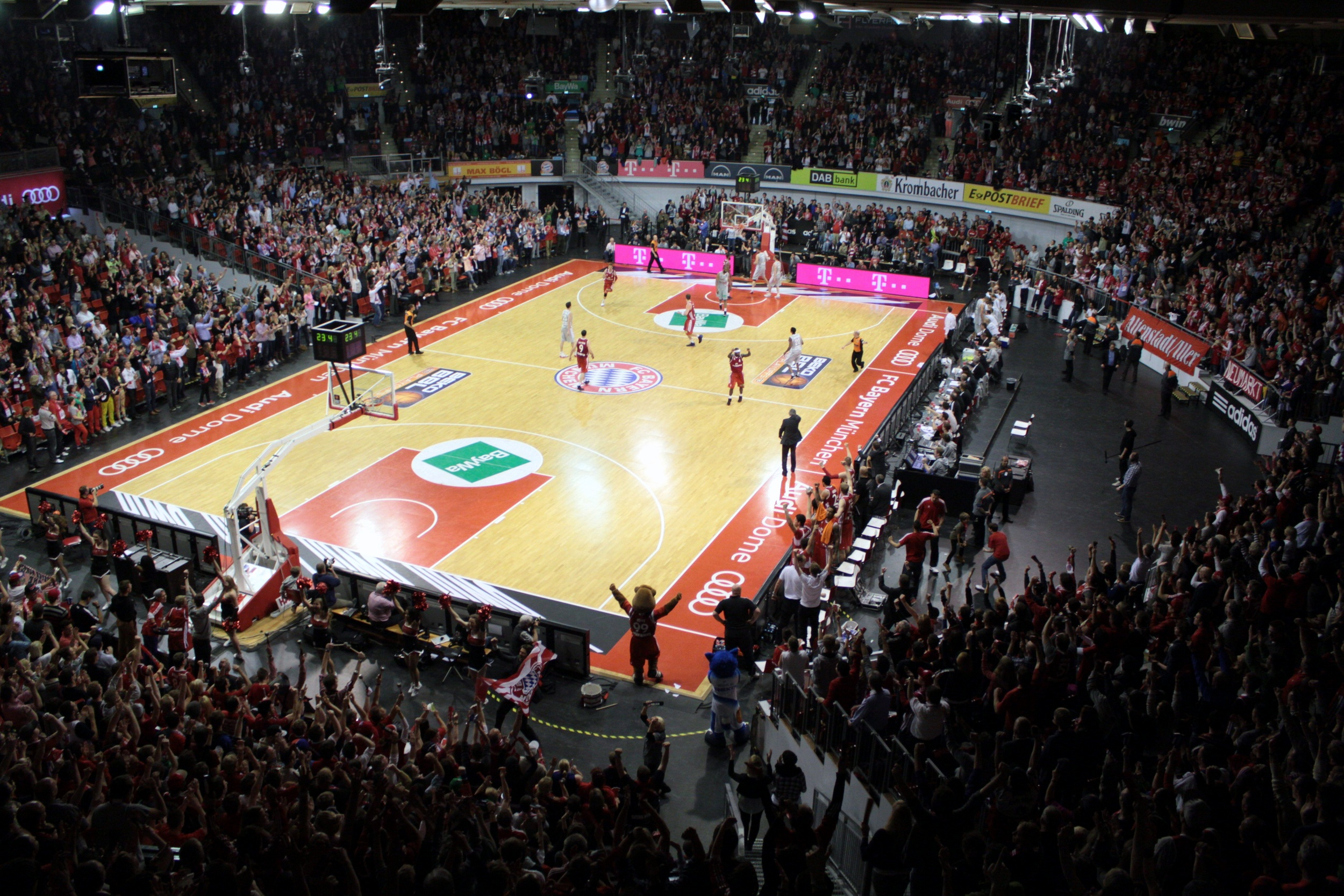
Inside view (in 2014) of the Rudi-Sedlmayer-Halle, where the final was played

The 1972 Olympic men's basketball final was the last game of that year’s Olympic basketball tournament, and became one of the most controversial events in Olympic history. With the ending mired in controversy, during regulation play Team USA defeated the Soviet Union by one point, but the Soviet Union was awarded the victory after play was repeatedly extended. Both the U.S. and the Soviet Union won their first eight games of the tournament, with the U.S. team having its overall Olympic record at 63–0 when they advanced to the final against the USSR. The final three seconds of the game were played three times under questionable rule interpretations, leading to an ultimate victory by the Soviet team. The result of the game is disputed to this day, with widespread allegations of political corruption. The United States team had won the previous seven gold medals at the Olympics, and was among the contenders to win another in Munich at the 1972 Summer Olympics.

== Background ==
The United States and Soviet Union sporting rivalry reached its peak during the Cold War. The U.S. men's team was considered a favorite in the run-up to the 1972 Games. Since the first Olympic basketball tournament at the 1936 Olympics in Berlin, the Americans had not lost a single game, winning seven consecutive gold medals in dominating fashion. Their record reached an unprecedented 63–0 before the final game. Since the 1952 tournament the Soviet team challenged the Americans, winning silver in 1952, 1956, 1960, 1964 and bronze in 1968. Outside of the Olympics, the Soviets had already defeated the U.S. team in FIBA World Championship play (at the 1959 world tournament and the 1963 world tournament). However, the Americans never sent their best collegiate players to that tournament.

The Olympics strictly prohibited any involvement of professional athletes at the time. The Soviet Union and other Eastern Bloc countries used that rule to their advantage, listing all their top players as soldiers or workers, which allowed them to breach the amateur rules. Western experts classified these athletes as professionals. On the other hand, leading American players were unable to play in the Olympics as they were officially professional and played in the NBA. That disadvantage had not prevented the Americans from winning the first seven Olympic basketball tournaments without a single defeat.

The confrontation of the Soviet Union and United States on the basketball court was deeply connected to the confrontation on the political front. Many American viewers assumed the 1972 Games were openly anti-American. There were rumors that the Communist party had bribed the officials because they wanted the USSR to win 50 gold medals at these Olympics in commemoration of the 50th anniversary of the Soviet Union.

== Preparation ==
The United States team was the youngest in history. American players usually participated in the Olympics once before turning pro, and the U.S. team always had new players every four years. The 1972 team did not have a clear leader. UCLA's Bill Walton, then a rising star, declined an invitation to participate. Some saw it as a political statement given Walton's opposition to the Vietnam War, but the most likely reason for his decision was his bad experience at the 1970 FIBA World Championship. In a 2004 interview with ESPN, Walton stated that "for the first time in my life, I was exposed to negative coaching and the berating of players and the foul language and the threatening of people who didn't perform." According to Russian sports historian Robert Edelman, "when (the Soviets) saw who was and wasn't on the U.S. team, that's when they started feeling like they'd actually have a chance. They followed American basketball closely and they knew that no Walton was going to be a big deal." Nevertheless, the team was favored, featuring such players as Doug Collins and Tommy Burleson (the tallest player among all teams).

The young American team was confronted by a veteran Soviet team, featuring stars Sergei Belov, Modestas Paulauskas, and Alexander Belov. The players had played together for more than seven years. For Gennadi Volnov it was the fourth Olympic appearance.

In 2004, Johnny Bach, an assistant on the 1972 American team, told ESPN: "Their team, it was reported, played almost 400 games together. 400 games. We had played 12 exhibition games and the trials."

== Road to the final ==
The basketball gold medal was the last in contention. The Soviets were clearly ahead in the medal standings, but for political reasons they needed to win 50 golds (having 49 before the final match).

Both teams started out strong, winning their first games by an average of 37 points. However, the Americans experienced a slump winning their fourth game against Brazil by only seven points with a score of 61–54. However, they rebounded and defeated Egypt by 65 (96–31) and Japan by 66 (99–33). Meanwhile, the Soviets had an easier time in their group, winning most of their games by more than 20. The only exceptions were against Italy (79–66) and Puerto Rico (100–87) when they won by 13. Their closest game was their last game when they played against Yugoslavia and won by seven (74–67).

Both teams were undefeated going into the semifinals when they faced the other group's runner-up (there was no quarterfinals at this point). The United States made easy work of Italy, defeating them 68–38, while the Soviets struggled against Cuba, winning by only six (67–61). This set up the gold medal match of the U.S. vs the USSR.

== During the game ==
The Soviets surprised the Americans early, led by Sergei Belov. The Soviets kept the Americans 4–8 points behind during the first half. At half-time the score was 26–21.

In the second half the Soviets provoked Dwight Jones, the leading scorer of the U.S. team. On the 28th minute during a loose ball scuffle he was assailed by Mikheil Korkia and responded. Both players were ejected. After this, Ivan Dvorny was also disqualified for protesting from the bench. The Soviets benefited from the double ejection, as they deemed Korkia less significant for them than Jones was to the Americans. The next minute Alexander Belov violently injured Jim Brewer during the free-throw, and Brewer was unable to continue playing.

With ten minutes left, the Soviets increased their lead to ten points. The Americans began to press, and led by Kevin Joyce were able to cut down Soviets' lead to one with thirty eight seconds left. With seven seconds to play, Doug Collins stole Alexander Belov's cross-court pass at half court and was fouled hard by Zurab Sakandelidze as he drove toward the basket, being knocked down into the basket stanchion. With three seconds remaining on the game clock, Collins was awarded two free throws and sank the first to tie the score at 49. Just as Collins lifted the ball to begin his shooting motion in attempting the second free throw, the horn from the scorer's table sounded, marking the beginning of a chain of events that left the game's final three seconds mired in controversy. Lead referee Renato Righetto turned away from the free throw attempt upon hearing the horn, but failed to stop play. Collins never broke his shooting motion and continued with his second free throw, scoring to put the U.S. ahead by a score of 50–49.

== Controversy ==
=== First inbounds play ===
Immediately following Collins' second free throw, with the ball then being a "live" ball under the rules at the time, Soviet assistant coach Sergei Bashkin charged out of the team's designated bench area to the scorer's table. He asserted that head coach Vladimir Kondrashin had called for a time-out, which should have been awarded prior to the second free throw, but that it had not been granted to them. Since a time-out could not legally be called after the second free throw, however, the Soviet players had to immediately inbound the live ball without a pre-planned play for the final three seconds. Alzhan Zharmukhamedov inbounded the ball to Sergei Belov, who began to dribble up the sideline, but the disturbance at the scorer's table led Righetto to stop play just as Belov approached mid-court. The game clock was stopped with one second remaining.

When play was stopped, the Soviets pressed their argument about the time-out, with Kondrashin and Bashkin claiming that it had been called as soon as Collins was fouled. By the rules at that time, a time-out could be requested either by informing the scorer's table directly, or by pressing the button of an electronic signaling device, which in turn would illuminate a light bulb at the scorer's table to alert the officials there of the coach's desire for a time-out. According to Kondrashin, he requested his time-out by pressing the button. Also by the rules at the time, upon calling a time-out prior to free throws, the coach was allowed to choose to have it awarded either before the first free throw or between the two free throws; (Note: In contrast to the time-out procedures used in 1972, FIBA rules as of 2012 did not allow for the granting of a time-out between free throws. Under Rule 18.2, a time-out can only be granted during a "time-out opportunity", and a time-out opportunity that begins with a dead ball preceding an attempted free throw would end once the player is given the ball for that free throw attempt.) he said he had chosen to take it between the two free throws. The game's referees, however, were not informed of a Soviet time-out request prior to giving the ball to Collins for the second free throw.

With regard to the resulting questions of whether he had ever actually made a proper time-out signal, Kondrashin claimed to have later seen a film of the events that he said showed the light bulb illuminating, as well as an official at the scorer's table nodding toward him in apparent recognition of the request. Regarding what happened next and his choice of when to take the requested time-out, Kondrashin said that the officials at the scorer's table "wanted to give me the time-out before the first free throw; of course I refused." However, Hans Tenschert, the game's official scorekeeper, later blamed the Soviet coaches, claiming that they mishandled their signaling device and were therefore late in pressing it.

The unexplained horn that sounded as Collins was shooting the second free throw may have happened because the scorer's table had recognized the Soviet time-out request at the last moment and was attempting to stop the second free throw to award it. Renato William Jones, the secretary general of FIBA at the time, later asserted that the problem had indeed been a human error at the scorer's table which resulted in the time-out request being relayed too late to the on-court officials. Despite Kondrashin's and Jones' assurances, the Americans have expressed doubt that the time-out was really called. They have also argued that regardless of whether a time-out may have been missed, the ball became live upon Collins' second free throw, and as such, a technical foul should have been assessed against the Soviets because their coach left the designated bench area during live play.

According to Righetto, after considering the Soviet arguments, the official decision was to deny the time-out. The protest later filed by the United States also mentioned that the game's official score sheet included no indication of a time-out being granted in the last three seconds. Collins has also confirmed that officially, the time-out was not awarded, which meant that Collins' second free throw counted and that neither team was to be allowed to substitute players when play resumed. Further indicators that no time-out was officially granted to the Soviets can be found in the existing television footage of the game, which includes shots of the scoreboard both before the incident and at the game's conclusion, indicating each time that Soviets had one time-out remaining. During the period between the game's interruption and resumption, the footage also does not include the sound of the scorer's table horn that typically would be used to signal both the start and the end of an officially charged time-out. However, even without being granted an official time-out, the minute-long delay to restore order on the court and determine how to proceed still gave the Soviet coaches time to confer with their players and devise a planned inbounds play.

Furthermore, although Bashkin's actions had caused the game to be stopped with one second remaining on the clock, the officials decided neither to resume play from that point, nor to assess a technical foul against him for having interrupted the play. They instead wiped out the play altogether, ruling that the entire inbounds sequence would be replayed from the point immediately following the second free throw and that the game clock would thus be reset to three seconds. Jones, who had had a contentious relationship with American basketball officials for a number of years, came down from the stands to the court to contribute to the officials' ruling, and he insisted upon a complete replay of the final three seconds. According to Tenschert, Righetto had initially declared that play would resume with just one second remaining, only to be overruled by Jones. Jones later acknowledged that under the Olympic regulations, he had no authority to make rulings about a game in progress, though he maintained that resetting the clock was the correct course of action. Ed Steitz who, over the course of his basketball career, served both as the president of USA Basketball and a member of FIBA's Technical Committee, claimed that years after the game, Jones privately confided that with the clock reset still leaving only three seconds to play, he had not expected the Soviets would actually be able to score within that time.

=== Second inbounds play ===
The players were brought back into position for a second inbounds play. However, instead of Zharmukhamedov returning to throw the inbounds pass, Kondrashin managed to substitute Ivan Edeshko into the game in Zharmukhamedov's place, something that wasn't allowed as the time-out wasn't officially awarded. Kondrashin's plan was to have Edeshko attempt a length-of-the-court pass to center Alexander Belov near the American basket, confident that Belov could catch any pass thrown accurately to him there and feeling that Edeshko was the player most skilled in executing such a pass. The two players had successfully run much the same play for CSKA Moscow team the preceding year to claim the Soviet Championship. Under the Olympic rules, substitutions were not to have been allowed without the granting of the time-out, but the referees resumed the game, failing to notice this issue and also not noticing that clock operator Andre Chopard was still working on getting the game clock set to three seconds. The ball was given to Edeshko to start play, with the scoreboard clock actually showing 50 seconds remaining.

Edeshko was defended at the end line by American center Tom McMillen. With his 6 ft 11 in (2.11 m) frame, McMillen aggressively challenged Edeshko's inbounds attempt, making it difficult for Edeshko to pass the ball into play. Edeshko ultimately made only a short pass to teammate Modestas Paulauskas standing in the Soviet backcourt. Paulauskas then immediately relayed a pass toward Belov at the other end of the court. But the horn sounded, with the pass barely out of Paulauskas's hand. The pass then missed its mark and was uneventfully tipped off the backboard. The players, the announcers of both television broadcasts, and the majority of the spectators in the arena all interpreted the sound of the horn, combined with the sight of a failed Soviet pass, as the end of the game. People flooded the court and the U.S. team began a joyful celebration of its apparent one-point victory.

With Jones still involved in the process, the officials once again ordered the court to be cleared, the players to be brought back into position, the clock to be reset, and the final three seconds be replayed. The public speaker announced, "Please go out. There are another three seconds left." Furious over the decision to deny the U.S. victory and allow the Soviets yet a third inbounds play, the U.S. coaches briefly considered unilaterally declaring the game to be over by pulling their team off the floor. However, head coach Henry "Hank" Iba was concerned that such an action would leave the U.S. vulnerable to a Soviet appeal, which might lead to a ruling that the U.S. had forfeited the game. U.S. assistant coach John Bach reported that Jones threatened him directly with such a forfeiture should the U.S. team not return to the floor. In finally deciding to comply with the officials, Iba reportedly told his coaching staff, "I don't want to lose this game later tonight, sitting on my butt."

=== Third inbounds play ===
On the third inbound try, McMillen was again assigned to use his height to challenge Edeshko's inbound pass. However, as official Artenik Arabadjian prepared to put the ball into play, he gestured to McMillen. McMillen responded by backing several feet away from Edeshko, which gave Edeshko a clear view and unobstructed path to throw a long pass down the court. McMillen later said that Arabadjian had instructed him to back away from Edeshko. McMillen said that despite the fact that there was no rule which would require him to do so, he decided to comply, fearing that if he did not, Arabadjian might assess a technical foul against him. For his part, Arabadjian has denied that his gesture was intended to instruct McMillen to back away from Edeshko.

In any event, McMillen's repositioning left no American defender to challenge Edeshko's pass. Unlike the previous play, where he had been forced to make a short pass into the backcourt, Edeshko now had a clear line to throw the ball the length of the court toward Alexander Belov. Edeshko would later confirm that McMillen's backing away made it easy for him to throw the long pass downcourt. In the Soviet Union, Edeshko's throw would eventually come to be known as "the golden pass".

The images of the play broadcast on American television by the ABC network have led to the question of whether Edeshko might have stepped on the end line—meaning that he should have been called for a violation—as he made his pass.

As Edeshko's full-court pass came down, Belov, Kevin Joyce and Jim Forbes all leapt for the ball near the basket. Belov caught the ball in the air, and as the three men landed, Joyce's momentum carried him out of bounds, while Forbes came down off-balance and fell to the floor beneath the basket. Belov then gathered himself and made an uncontested layup, scoring the winning points as the horn sounded for the last time. After jubilantly sprinting to the other end of the court, Belov was mobbed by his delirious teammates who dogpiled atop him in celebration. American coaches and players argued with the game officials for several minutes, but to no avail, as the Soviets were declared the victors.

== Scoreboard ==
September 9
23:30

Boxscore

Soviet Union	51–50	United States
Scoring by half: 26–21, 25–29
Pts: Sergei Belov 20; Rebs: Alexander Belov 8		Pts: Tom Henderson, Jim Brewer 9 each Rebs: Mike Bantom 9

Rudi-Sedlmayer-Halle, Munich
Referees: Renato Righetto (Brazil), Artenik Arabadjian (Bulgaria)

== Rosters ==
Soviet Union (Russian Soviet Federative Socialist Republic) Aleksandr Belov (Russian Soviet Federative Socialist Republic) Sergei Belov (Russian Soviet Federative Socialist Republic) Aleksandr Boloshev (Russian Soviet Federative Socialist Republic) Ivan Dvorny (Byelorussian Soviet Socialist Republic) Ivan Edeshko (Georgian Soviet Socialist Republic) Mikheil Korkia (Ukrainian Soviet Socialist Republic) Sergei Kovalenko (Lithuanian Soviet Socialist Republic) Modestas Paulauskas (c) (Ukrainian Soviet Socialist Republic) Anatoli Polivoda (Georgian Soviet Socialist Republic) Zurab Sakandelidze (Russian Soviet Federative Socialist Republic) Gennadi Volnov (Kazakh Soviet Socialist Republic) Alzhan Zharmukhamedov	United States Mike Bantom; Jim Brewer; Tommy Burleson; Doug Collins; Kenneth Davis (c); James Forbes; Tom Henderson; Dwight Jones; Robert Jones; Kevin Joyce; Tom McMillen; Ed Ratleff

== United States protest ==
By some accounts, at the end of the game, Righetto refused to sign the official scoring sheet in an act of protest. Herb Mols, serving as the resident manager of the U.S. team, and U.S. Olympic Basketball Committee chairman MK Summers, filed a detailed protest, which was heard by FIBA's five-member jury of appeal. Mols and Summers contended that the final three seconds of the 40-minute game were consumed by the two seconds that elapsed on the first inbounds play and the one second that elapsed on the second play, thus marking the legal end of the game at that point and a United States victory by the score of 50–49. The protest asserted that allowing a third inbounds play with the clock reset to three seconds brought the total elapsed game time to 40 minutes and three seconds, in violation of FIBA rules which specified the length of a game to be 40 minutes. The jury ultimately voted down the protest and awarded the gold medals to the Soviet team. At the ensuing press conference, Mols engaged in an animated argument with the jury's chairman, Ferenc Hepp of Hungary, about the propriety of resetting the clock to three seconds. Tenschert also angrily dissented with the jury's ruling, declaring, "Under FIBA rules, the United States won."

In announcing the verdict, Hepp steadfastly refused to provide the specifics of the vote count, acknowledging only that the decision was not unanimous. With three of the five jury members, including Hepp, being from Soviet-allied nations, this fueled speculation that the tally had been 3–2 and perhaps based more upon Cold War politics than the FIBA rulebook. This view was further suggested when jury members Rafael Lopez and Claudio Coccia — from US-allied Puerto Rico and Italy, respectively — each reportedly confirmed having voted for the United States, thus indicating that pro-Soviet votes could have come only from Hepp of Hungary, Adam Bagłajewski of Poland, and Andres Keiser of Cuba. Nonetheless, Hepp, the only one who had seen all five votes of the secret ballot, maintained his refusal to divulge the specific votes of any of the panel members, beyond later granting that his own vote was in favor of the Soviets. Despite this absence of confirmation from Hepp, it has become generally accepted and reported as fact that there indeed was a 3–2 vote that matched the political alliances of the time. Aside from potential political motivations, Mols suggested that panel members feared retribution from Jones were they to have deemed his decision regarding the game clock to be incorrect. In any event, the U.S. players did not accept the jury's verdict, voting unanimously to refuse their silver medals, and the team did not attend the medal ceremony. The silver medals are still kept in a vault in Lausanne, Switzerland.

After the conclusion of the games, the United States Olympic Committee launched another appeal, this time to the executive committee of the International Olympic Committee (IOC). It received the support of Righetto, who was quoted saying the Soviet victory was "completely irregular, and outsides the rules of the game of basketball". Righetto criticized Jones's insistence that the clock be reset to three seconds, and offered that he felt it would have been more fair to have instead resumed play with only the one second on the clock that had been remaining when play was suspended. Righetto also asserted that the initial confusion was partially attributable to a language barrier, as he, a Brazilian, spoke Portuguese, but those working the scorer's table spoke only German. Also supporting the U.S. appeal was Chopard, who noted that in his 12 years of service as a timekeeper, Jones' order to put elapsed time back onto the clock was unprecedented. The appeal was unsuccessful, however, as in February 1973, the IOC ruled that matter fell under FIBA's jurisdiction.

== Aftermath ==
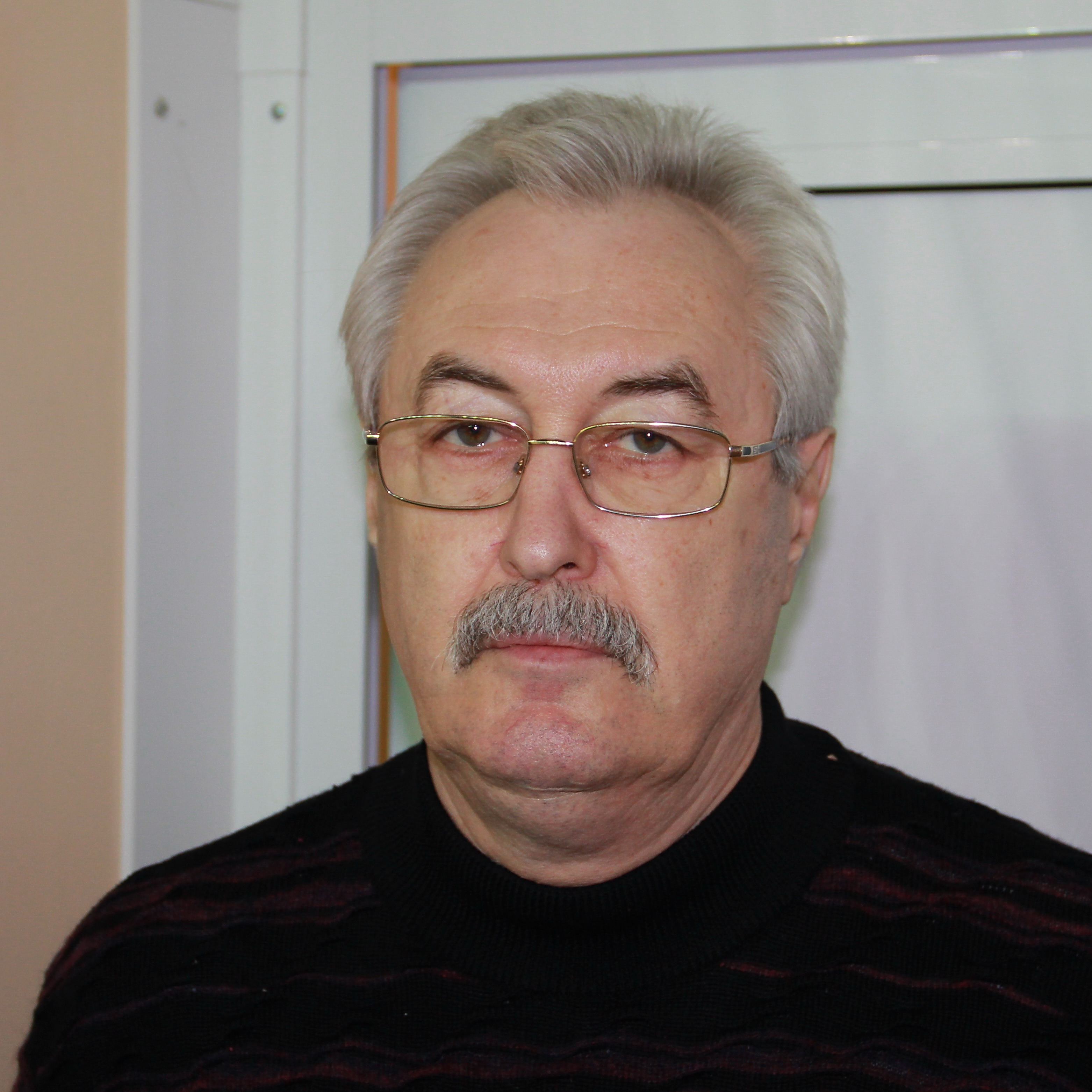
Sergei Belov in 2012, one year before his death

In the ensuing years, USA Basketball has periodically contacted the 1972 U.S. team members on behalf of the IOC to offer them the opportunity to change their stance and accept the silver medals, possibly being granted an official ceremony awarding them. In 1992, team member Ed Ratleff said that although he did not personally want the medal, his wife felt very strongly about his accepting it and being able to show it to their children. He said that his vote would be to accept the medal, but that he was casting his vote that way only in deference to her wishes. In a 2012 interview with Todd Jones of The Columbus Dispatch, Ratleff emphasized that the desire to accept the silver medal was his wife's, not his. Since divorced, he affirmed his intention never to accept it. The ten remaining team members each told the magazine that they would vote to refuse the acceptance of silver medals.

With regard to awarding the medals, the IOC has insisted that for such an action, the entire team would need to consent unanimously. Kenny Davis reported that he had gone so far as to have a clause put into his will forbidding his wife, children or descendants from ever accepting the silver medal after his death. In 2012, Davis organized a reunion of the 12 team members—the first time they had all been together since 1972—and reported that after some discussion, the group was unanimous in its rejection of the silver medals. "In basketball, there's one winner," he said. "By the rules of that game, we won." The gathering included a group round-table interview of the players that was documented in the ESPN 30 for 30 short film Silver Reunion.

When the IOC chose to resolve the figure skating scandal at the 2002 Winter Olympics by awarding duplicate gold medals to the original silver medalists, Tom McMillen, who had gone on to become a United States congressman, appealed to the IOC, requesting that the committee revisit its 1972 decision to declare the U.S. team to be the silver medalists of the men's basketball event. The 2002 decision arose because a French judge had been unduly pressured by the Russian officials to inflate the scores of the Russian pair. The American appeal argued that Jones' unauthorized intervention in 1972 brought similar undue pressure upon the officiating crew of that game. According to McMillen, the IOC did not respond to his appeal.

In the Soviet Union, the outcome of the game was heralded and the players celebrated as heroes, with comparatively little attention given to the controversy surrounding the team's victory. When asked about the subject, Soviet team members have indicated that they view their triumph as having been achieved legitimately. Edeshko and Sergei Belov, in particular, have been critical of the Americans for refusing to accept having lost, with Edeshko saying that he regrets that others may feel the Soviets' gold medals were undeserved, but that he harbors no such doubts himself. From his perspective as coach, Kondrashin acknowledged that the controversy did somewhat diminish his enjoyment of the triumph. However, he still cited the victory as the greatest accomplishment of his basketball career.

== Cultural references ==
The game and its controversies are presented from a Russian point of view as part of the 2017 Russian sport drama film Going Vertical (Russian: Движение вверх, romanized: Dvizhenie vverkh).

The game is also featured in the ESPN documentaries Silver Reunion (2013; part of 30 for 30), and Episode 2 of Basketball: A Love Story (2018).
