= Renato Righetto =

Brazilian basketball referee (1921–2001)

Personal information
- Born: 30 January 1921 Campinas, São Paulo, Brazil
- Died: 18 November 2001 (aged 80) Campinas, São Paulo, Brazil
- Position: Referee
- Officiating career: 1960–1977

Career highlights
- FIBA Hall of Fame (2007)
- FIBA Hall of Fame

Renato Righetto (30 January 1921 – 18 November 2001) was a Brazilian basketball referee. He was an architect by his main occupation. He refereed over 800 international basketball games from 1960 to 1977. He worked at the 1960 Olympics, 1964 Olympics, 1968 Olympics and 1972 Olympics (including final games in 1960, 1968 and 1972), 1971 Women's World Championship, 1967 Pan American Games and 1971 Pan American Games. Righetto was the lead referee in the controversial 1972 Olympic men's basketball final. He was enshrined in the FIBA Hall of Fame in 2007.
