= List of results of the United States women's basketball team at the Olympics =

Results for the USA women's Olympic basketball team

The following is a list of results of the United States women's basketball team at the Summer Olympics:

== 1976 Summer Olympics ==
Game #	Opponent	Result	Point differential	Round	Notes	Ref.
1976 Summer Olympics (Montreal)
Game 1	Japan	L 71–84	-13	Group Play	First USA loss in Olympic competition	
Game 2	Bulgaria	W 95–79	+16	Group Play		
Game 3	Canada	W 89–75	+14	Group Play		
Game 4	Soviet Union	L 77–112	-35	Group Play	Largest USA margin of loss in Olympic competition	
Game 5	Czechoslovakia	W 83–67	+18	Group Play	USA wins silver medal	
Overall record: 3–2

== 1980 Summer Olympics ==
Game #	Opponent	Result	Point differential	Round	Notes	Ref.
1980 Summer Olympics (Moscow)
USA qualified for Olympic tournament but did not participate due to 1980 Summer Olympics boycott

== 1984 Summer Olympics ==
Game #	Opponent	Result	Point differential	Round	Notes	Ref.
1984 Summer Olympics (Los Angeles)
Game 1	Yugoslavia	W 83–55	+28	Group Play		
Game 2	Australia	W 81–47	+34	Group Play		
Game 3	South Korea	W 84–47	+37	Group Play		
Game 4	China	W 91–55	+36	Group Play		
Game 5	Canada	W 92–61	+31	Semifinals		
Game 6	South Korea	W 85–55	+30	Gold Medal Final	USA wins gold medal	
Overall record: 6–0

== 1988 Summer Olympics ==
Game #	Opponent	Result	Point differential	Round	Notes	Ref.
1988 Summer Olympics (Seoul)
Game 1	Czechoslovakia	W 87–81	+6	Group Play		
Game 2	Yugoslavia	W 101–74	+27	Group Play		
Game 3	China	W 94–79	+15	Group Play		
Game 4	Soviet Union	W 102–88	+14	Semifinals		
Game 5	Yugoslavia	W 77–70	+7	Gold Medal Final	USA wins gold medal	
Overall record: 5–0

== 1992 Summer Olympics ==
Game #	Opponent	Result	Point differential	Round	Notes	Ref.
1992 Summer Olympics (Barcelona)
Game 1	Czechoslovakia	W 111–55	+56	Group Play	Tied for third largest USA margin of victory in Olympic competition	
Game 2	China	W 93–67	+26	Group Play		
Game 3	Spain	W 114–59	+55	Group Play		
Game 4	Unified Team (CIS)	L 73–79	-6	Semifinals	Third USA loss in Olympic competition	
Game 5	Cuba	W 88–74	+14	Bronze Medal Final	USA wins bronze medal	
Overall record: 4–1

== 1996 Summer Olympics ==
Game #	Opponent	Result	Point differential	Round	Notes	Ref.
1996 Summer Olympics (Atlanta)
Game 1	Cuba	W 101–84	+17	Group Play		
Game 2	Ukraine	W 98–65	+33	Group Play		
Game 3	Zaire	W 107–47	+60	Group Play	Second largest USA margin of victory in Olympic competition	
Game 4	Australia	W 96–79	+17	Group Play		
Game 5	South Korea	W 105–64	+41	Group Play		
Game 6	Japan	W 108–93	+15	Quarterfinals		
Game 7	Australia	W 93–71	+22	Semifinals		
Game 8	Brazil	W 111–87	+24	Gold Medal Final	USA wins gold medal	
Overall record: 8–0

== 2000 Summer Olympics ==
Game #	Opponent	Result	Point differential	Round	Notes	Ref.
2000 Summer Olympics (Sydney)
Game 1	South Korea	W 89–75	+14	Group Play		
Game 2	Cuba	W 90–61	+29	Group Play		
Game 3	Russia	W 88–77	+11	Group Play		
Game 4	New Zealand	W 93–42	+51	Group Play		
Game 5	Poland	W 76–57	+19	Group Play		
Game 6	Slovakia	W 58–43	+15	Quarterfinals		
Game 7	South Korea	W 78–65	+13	Semifinals		
Game 8	Australia	W 76–54	+22	Gold Medal Final	USA wins gold medal	
Overall record: 8–0

== 2004 Summer Olympics ==
Game #	Opponent	Result	Point differential	Round	Notes	Ref.
2004 Summer Olympics (Athens)
Game 1	New Zealand	W 93–47	+46	Group Play		
Game 2	Czech Republic	W 80–61	+19	Group Play		
Game 3	South Korea	W 80–57	+23	Group Play		
Game 4	Spain	W 71–58	+13	Group Play		
Game 5	China	W 100–62	+38	Group Play		
Game 6	Greece	W 102–72	+30	Quarterfinals		
Game 7	Russia	W 66–62	+4	Semifinals	Smallest USA margin of victory in Olympic competition	
Game 8	Australia	W 74–63	+11	Gold Medal Final	USA wins gold medal	
Overall record: 8–0

== 2008 Summer Olympics ==
Game #	Opponent	Result	Point differential	Round	Notes	Ref.
2008 Summer Olympics (Beijing)
Game 1	Czech Republic	W 97–57	+40	Group Play		
Game 2	China	W 108–63	+45	Group Play		
Game 3	Mali	W 97–41	+56	Group Play	Tied for third largest USA margin of victory in Olympic competition	
Game 4	Spain	W 93–55	+38	Group Play		
Game 5	New Zealand	W 96–60	+36	Group Play		
Game 6	South Korea	W 104–60	+44	Quarterfinals		
Game 7	Russia	W 67–52	+15	Semifinals		
Game 8	Australia	W 92–65	+27	Gold Medal Final	USA wins gold medal	
Overall record: 8–0

== 2012 Summer Olympics ==
Game #	Opponent	Result	Point differential	Round	Notes	Ref.
2012 Summer Olympics (London)
Game 1	Croatia	W 81–56	+25	Group Play		
Game 2	Angola	W 90-38	+52	Group Play		
Game 3	Turkey	W 89–58	+31	Group Play		
Game 4	Czech Republic	W 88-61	+27	Group Play		
Game 5	China	W 114-66	+48	Group Play		
Game 6	Canada	W 91–48	+43	Quarterfinals		
Game 7	Australia	W 86-73	+13	Semifinals		
Game 8	France	W 86-50	+36	Gold Medal Final	USA wins gold medal	
Overall record: 8–0

== 2016 Summer Olympics ==
Game #	Opponent	Result	Point differential	Round	Notes	Ref.
2016 Summer Olympics (Rio de Janeiro)
Game 1	Senegal	W 121–56	+65	Group Play	Largest USA margin of victory in Olympic competition	
Game 2	Spain	W 103–63	+40	Group Play		
Game 3	Serbia	W 110–84	+26	Group Play		
Game 4	Canada	W 81–51	+30	Group Play		
Game 5	China	W 105–62	+43	Group Play		
Game 6	Japan	W 110–64	+46	Quarterfinals		
Game 7	France	W 86–67	+19	Semifinals		
Game 8	Spain	W 101–72	+29	Gold Medal Final	USA wins gold medal	
Overall record: 8–0

== 2020 Summer Olympics ==
Game #	Opponent	Result	Point differential	Round	Notes	Ref.
2020 Summer Olympics (Tokyo)
Game 1	Nigeria	W 81–72	+9	Group Play		
Game 2	Japan	W 86–69	+17	Group Play		
Game 3	France	W 93–82	+11	Group Play		
Game 4	Australia	W 79–55	+24	Quarterfinals		
Game 5	Serbia	W 79–59	+20	Semifinals		
Game 6	Japan	W 90–75	+15	Gold Medal Final	USA wins gold medal	
Overall record: 6–0

== See also ==
- List of results of the United States men's basketball team at the Olympics
