= George Buckheit =

American distance runner

Personal information
- Nationality: American
- Born: June 26, 1957 (age 69) Rockville Centre, New York

Sport
- Sport: Track
- Events: 2-mile, 5000 meters, 10,000 meters
- College team: Bucknell

Achievements and titles
- Personal bests: Indoor 2-mile: 8:35.0; 10,000 meters: 28:39.8

George Buckheit (born June 26, 1957) is a former distance runner. After an illustrious collegiate career running for Bucknell, during which he received All-American honors, he went on to compete for the United States in international competition and subsequently began coaching runners in the northern Virginia area. He is the founder and head coach of Capital Area Runners.

== Running career ==
=== High school ===
Buckheit attended Albertus Magnus High School, where was noticed by track coach Dick Weis during a gym class in the spring of 1973. Coach Weis convinced Buckheit to run track. His AMHS team went on to become New York State Champions in Cross Country in the fall of 1974 and finished 2nd in the 2 Mile National Postal Championship, the only national high school team championship contested at that time.

=== Collegiate ===
Buckheit was recruited to Bucknell University. During his enrollment there, Buckheit was the East Coast Conference (ECC) cross country champion in 1977 and 1978 and winner of eight ECC indoor and outdoor track titles at distances ranging from 1500m to 10,000m, was All-East three straight years and an All-American in indoor and outdoor track as a senior. He captained the first Bucknell team to qualify for the NCAA Cross Country Championship, leading the 1978 team to an 18th-place finish at the NCAA meet. Earlier that season, Buckheit established a course record of 24:44.4 on Bucknell's 5.15-mile cross country course. Buckheit's first qualification to an NCAA Track and Field Championship happened in 1977 when he qualified for the 5,000 meter discipline. In 1978 and 1979, he would qualify again although this time for the 10,000 meter race. On March 10, 1979, Buckheit placed third at the 1979 NCAA Indoor Track and Field Championship for the 3-mile race, running a time of 13:35.65. On June 1, 1979, Buckheit placed 6th at the NCAA Outdoor Track and Field Championship in the 10,000m run in a time of 28:55.36 earning his second All-America honor. Buckheit won back-to-back Colonial Relays 10,000m titles in 1978 (29:24.0) and 1979 (29:08.9). Years after he left college he was inducted into the Bucknell Bison Hall of Fame.

=== Post-collegiate ===
After graduating from Bucknell, Buckheit competed in a wide range of events in road races and track invitationals. He raced with Westchester Track Club, which was occasionally listed as "Puma Track Club" due to sponsorship reasons. At the Budweiser Invitational held in Boston on February 11, 1983, in an indoor 2-mile race won by Bruce Bickford in 8:33.7, Buckheit placed second overall with a personal-best time of 8:35.0. On September 18, 1983, he placed 16th overall at the 1983 Philadelphia Distance Run, recording 1:05:18 in the half marathon course.

He set multiple records on the New York road racing circuit as a post-collegian. On June 23, 1984, Buckheit won the Shelter Island 10K race and finished in 29:42.1 (min/sec). Buckheit has held the course record for Philadelphia's 8.4-mile Schuylkill River Loop since 1981 with a time of 40:08. His best results for the 5000 meter and the 10,000 meter on the track were 13:43 and 28:39 respectively.

In 1992, at 35 years old, he won the marathon at the Empire State Games. It was his first time running a full marathon and he did not intend to complete the race until he found himself still among the leaders after 20 miles.

== Coaching ==
Buckheit began his coaching career in 1979 as a graduate assistant at his alma mater Bucknell University. After completing his competitive running career, he went on to coach marathon runners in the Washington, DC metropolitan region. He is the founder and head coach of the Capital Area Runners. He coached Marine Corps Marathon Champions Mary Kate Bailey (2004) and Kristen Henehan (2007) as well as 2012 British Olympic Marathoner Claire Hallissey. Buckheit coached Hallissey to an 18th-place finish in the 2010 World Half Marathon Championships.
