= Gary Wozniak =

American skeleton racer (born 1987)

Medal record

Men's skeleton

Representing the United States

Empire State Winter Games
Gold medal – first place	2012 Lake Placid	

Gary Wozniak (born November 27, 1987) is an American skeleton racer who won the gold medal at the 2012 Empire State Games in Lake Placid, New York.
