= Basketball: A Love Story =

- Genre: Sports documentary
- Created by: Dan Klores
- Directed by: Dan Klores
- Country of origin: United States
- Original language: English
- No. of episodes: 10 (divided into 62 short films)

Production
- Running time: 20 hours
- Production company: My Three Sons Productions

Original release
- Network: ESPN; ESPN2
- Release: October 9 – November 13, 2018

Basketball: A Love Story is a 2018 sports documentary film series directed by Dan Klores and distributed by ESPN Films. The 20-hour series features 62 "short stories" distributed across 10 episodes, with each story varying from five to more than 30 minutes in length and exploring various topics from all aspects of the sport of basketball, including the NBA, ABA, WNBA, college basketball, and the international game, as well as a broad variety of social and cultural issues related to or influenced by the sport. All 62 shorts were originally made available online via the ESPN App on September 18, 2018, and subsequently also aired on ESPN in a serialized format of four-hour blocks over six weeks, beginning October 9 and ending November 13, 2018.

Klores and a team of producers conducted more than 500 hours of interviews with 165 personalities representing all sides of basketball, including players, coaches, executives, and journalists. Interviewees include Adam Silver, David Stern, Kobe Bryant, LeBron James, Shaquille O'Neal, Allen Iverson, Steve Nash, Charles Barkley, Julius Erving, Earl Monroe, John Havlicek, Bill Walton, Isiah Thomas, Moses Malone, David Robinson, Elvin Hayes, Mike Krzyzewski, Doug Collins, Rick Pitino, Phil Jackson, Hubie Brown, Cheryl Miller, Diana Taurasi, Bill Simmons, Stephen A. Smith, Jackie MacMullan, Pete Vecsey and Bob Ryan, among many others. The episodes are variously narrated by Chadwick Boseman, Michael Che, Chris Cuomo, Daveed Diggs, Ansel Elgort, Ashley Judd, Julianne Moore, Robin Quivers, Ahmad Rashad, and Fisher Stevens.

== Production ==
Klores began interviews for a film project in 2013 that would tell the complete, untold story of basketball, intending at first to compile 10 hours of documentary footage. He quickly ended up with much more material than could fit into that duration, and the film's length was doubled. The entire film consists of 62 short subject films, envisioned as "short stories", discussing a diverse array of topics related to the game at every level, from its origins to its technical aspects, the lives of its players and coaches, and the impacts it has had on society and culture around the world. The stories are deliberately not presented in chronological order. Klores explained: "It’s like opening a book of short stories... Even when it was 10 hours, I never intended it to be a series of mini-biographical vignettes, if you will. That would have bored me, frankly. So, it’s kind of like 62 different films, just short stories. But the transitions are logical."

== Reception ==
Basketball: A Love Story met with mixed reviews from critics and audiences. Many praised the series's ambitious nature and "unprecedented" distribution format but criticized perceived thematic discontinuities, a lack of depth in certain topics, and equivocation about some of the game's most sensitive past and present issues, including racism, sexism, and violence committed by players and coaches.

Jack Hamilton of Slate criticized the documentary's tendency to gloss over or completely omit these unhappier aspects of basketball history, writing that "the film’s patchwork structure allows it to effectively ignore moments that would complicate its sunny-side-up presentation of the sports’ trajectory", and noted the inexplicable absence of seemingly relevant stories like that of the infamous "Malice at the Palace" brawl. Hamilton and Jen Chaney of Vulture both remarked that several previous 30 for 30 films have covered some of the same stories with much greater nuance and detail.

== Episodes ==
=== Episode 1 ===
| Story Number | Title | Original release date | Length (mins) |
|---|---|---|---|
| 1 | Love of the Game | October 9, 2018 | 9:28 |
Players, coaches, and fans discuss their obsession with and passion for the game.
| 2 | The Teachers | October 9, 2018 | 5:59 |
| 3 | The Choke | October 9, 2018 | 10:21 |
NBA guard Latrell Sprewell's career was marred by a notorious 1997 incident in which he choked Warriors head coach P.J. Carlesimo during practice.
| 4 | Origins | October 9, 2018 | 10:40 |
From humble beginnings at a Massachusetts YMCA in 1891, basketball exploded into colleges, professional leagues, and American culture.
| 5 | Scandal | October 9, 2018 | 16:17 |
| 6 | Signature Moves: The Feel | October 9, 2018 | 10:48 |
| 7 | The Spring of '57 | October 9, 2018 | 32:32 |

=== Episode 2 ===
| Story Number | Title | Original release date | Length (mins) |
|---|---|---|---|
| 8 | Patriots to Protest | October 9, 2018 | 24:11 |
| 9 | Signature Moves: The Touch | October 9, 2018 | 6:39 |
| 10 | ABA: The Red, White and Blue | October 9, 2018 | 23:49 |
| 11 | The Dipper and The Winner | October 9, 2018 | 18:48 |
| 12 | Signature Moves: Discipline | October 9, 2018 | 5:16 |
| 13 | Mayhem in Munich | October 9, 2018 | 18:47 |
Against the backdrop of terrorism at the 1972 Summer Olympics, the U.S. men's basketball team meets the Soviets in a controversial gold-medal game.

=== Episode 3 ===
| Story Number | Title | Original release date | Length (mins) |
|---|---|---|---|
| 14 | Brotherly Love | October 16, 2018 | 16:45 |
| 15 | The Witch Hunt | October 16, 2018 | 21:21 |
| 16 | Birth of the Bruins | October 16, 2018 | 11:28 |
| 17 | Tomboys | October 16, 2018 | 10:22 |
| 18 | Rupp's Reckoning | October 16, 2018 | 18:41 |
| 19 | Renegades | October 16, 2018 | 25:00 |
The fledgling ABA attracts a distinctive roster of turbulent players and talented coaches in the years before its merger with the NBA.

=== Episode 4 ===
| Story Number | Title | Original release date | Length (mins) |
|---|---|---|---|
| 20 | The Eighth Wonder | October 16, 2018 | 22:16 |
College stars Lew Alcindor and Elvin Hayes square off in a 1968 match between UCLA and Houston at The Astrodome.
| 21 | Title IX: Immaculata | October 16, 2018 | 9:46 |
| 22 | Joy or Relief? | October 16, 2018 | 10:16 |
For coaches and players alike, winning a championship is a deeply emotional experience.
| 23 | Oscar and West | October 16, 2018 | 21:19 |
The story of Oscar Robertson and Jerry West in their successful attempt for the NBA Championship that had eluded them for years
| 24 | Self-Expression | October 16, 2018 | 15:43 |
The flashy fashions and unique personalities cultivated by the game's biggest stars have given basketball a style all its own.
| 25 | One and Done | October 16, 2018 | 19:27 |

=== Episode 5 ===
| Story Number | Title | Original release date | Length (mins) |
|---|---|---|---|
| 26 | David versus Goliath | October 23, 2018 | 21:02 |
| 27 | General Knight | October 23, 2018 | 17:42 |
| 28 | Deal of the Century | October 23, 2018 | 10:44 |
| 29 | Wild Days | October 23, 2018 | 23:55 |
The 1975 and 1976 NBA Finals as seen through the eyes of Rick Barry and John Havlicek.
| 30 | Do or Die | October 23, 2018 | 7:14 |
George Gervin and David Thompson race for the 1978 NBA scoring title right up to the last day of the regular season.
| 31 | Tailspin | October 23, 2018 | 22:17 |
Widespread drug abuse led to on-court and off-court troubles for many NBA players in the late 1970s.

=== Episode 6 ===
| Story Number | Title | Original release date | Length (mins) |
|---|---|---|---|
| 32 | Portland's 1-Year Dynasty | October 23, 2018 | 16:40 |
The Portland Trail Blazers defeated the heavily favored Philadelphia 76ers to capture the 1977 NBA championship.
| 33 | The First Lady | October 23, 2018 | 8:48 |
| 34 | Don't Call Me Buckwheat | October 23, 2018 | 10:20 |
| 35 | Genius Gene | October 23, 2018 | 9:17 |
| 36 | John Thompson's America | October 23, 2018 | 20:08 |
Georgetown Hoyas coach John Thompson redefined east-coast college basketball.
| 37 | NBA: It's Fantastic | October 23, 2018 | 11:27 |
In the mid-1980s, commissioner David Stern revitalizes the NBA's popular image with public outreach, clever marketing campaigns, and celebrity endorsements.
| 38 | Contempt: LA vs. Boston | October 23, 2018 | 27:29 |
The classic rivalry between the NBA's Los Angeles Lakers and Boston Celtics.

=== Episode 7 ===
| Story Number | Title | Original release date | Length (mins) |
|---|---|---|---|
| 39 | The First Lottery | October 30, 2018 | 12:00 |
| 40 | Signature Moves: The Mind | October 30, 2018 | 12:12 |
| 41 | Born to Coach | October 30, 2018 | 18:47 |
| 42 | Glasnost: The Walls Come Down | October 30, 2018 | 22:24 |
| 43 | Little Big Men | October 30, 2018 | 11:45 |
In a game dominated by very tall players, the shortest ones have unique advantages and disadvantages.
| 44 | Air Jordan | October 30, 2018 | 24:41 |
The prodigal rise of Michael Jordan and the shoe endorsement that changed basketball.

=== Episode 8 ===
| Story Number | Title | Original release date | Length (mins) |
|---|---|---|---|
| 45 | Magic | October 30, 2018 | 16:38 |
Magic Johnson's retirement due to HIV causes controversy in the NBA but helps to raise public awareness of the disease.
| 46 | The Changing of the Guard | October 30, 2018 | 25:33 |
| 47 | Dream Team | October 30, 2018 | 18:49 |
| 48 | Phil Jackson and MJ | October 30, 2018 | 13:11 |
| 49 | Pat versus Geno | October 30, 2018 | 25:07 |

=== Episode 9 ===
| Story Number | Title | Original release date | Length (mins) |
|---|---|---|---|
| 50 | The W | November 13, 2018 | 15:30 |
| 51 | The Spurs Way | November 13, 2018 | 14:59 |
Driven by a cast of international talent, the San Antonio Spurs under coach Gregg Popovich exemplify a dynamic brand of team-oriented play and capture four NBA titles in the process.
| 52 | NCAA: Pay or Play? | November 13, 2018 | 6:00 |
| 53 | Triangle: Kobe, Shaq, and Phil | November 13, 2018 | 26:34 |
Kobe Bryant, Shaquille O'Neal, and coach Phil Jackson join forces as the core of a Los Angeles Lakers team that wins three consecutive NBA championships, despite an often bitter feud between its two star players.
| 54 | Size Matters | November 13, 2018 | 17:33 |
| 55 | LeBron Enters | November 13, 2018 | 15:30 |

=== Episode 10 ===
| Story Number | Title | Original release date | Length (mins) |
|---|---|---|---|
| 56 | The Decision | November 13, 2018 | 17:04 |
NBA superstar LeBron James announces he will sign with the Miami Heat in a controversial 2010 television special.
| 57 | America's Game | November 13, 2018 | 18:00 |
| 58 | Battles Royale | November 13, 2018 | 27:35 |
The Miami Heat, led by a trio of star players, compete in four consecutive NBA Finals series from 2011 to 2014.
| 59 | Analytically Correct | November 13, 2018 | 8:24 |
| 60 | Golden State Emerges | November 13, 2018 | 14:56 |
The birth of a new Golden State Warriors dynasty in the 2010s.
| 61 | Basketball Hysteria | November 13, 2018 | 9:23 |
| 62 | Basketball Pass | November 13, 2018 | 6:21 |

== See also ==
- 30 for 30
