= Herb Mols =

American sports administrator

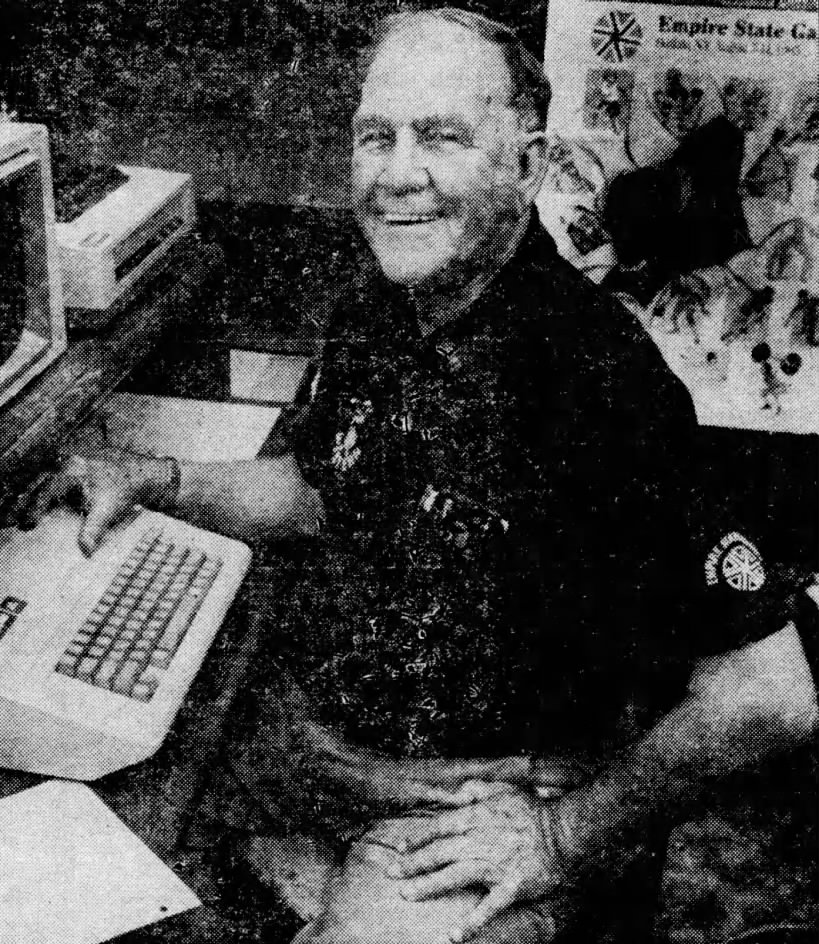
- Mols in 1985
- Born: March 31, 1915; Buffalo, New York, U.S.
- Died: August 10, 1986 (aged 71)
- Education: Cornell University
- Occupation: Sports administrator

Herb Mols (March 31, 1915 – August 10, 1986), also known as Herbert Mols, was an American sports administrator.

== Life and career ==
Mols was born in Buffalo. He attended Cornell University, graduating in 1936. He served in the Navy during World War II.

Mols was president of the Niagara Association Amateur Athletic Union during the 1960s.

At the 1972 Summer Olympics, Mols served as manager of the United States men's Olympic basketball team.

Mols died on August 10, 1986, at the age of 71.
