= List of presidents of FIBA =

President of FIBA
- Incumbent; Sheikh Saud Ali Al Thani since 23 August 2023
- Fédération Internationale de Basketball
- Member of: FIBA Central Board; FIBA Executive Committee
- Seat: Patrick Baumann House of Basketball (FIBA Headquarters), Mies, Switzerland
- Appointer: FIBA Congress
- Term length: Four years Elected in the year of a FIBA Basketball World Cup (non-renewable; geographical alternation)
- Constituting instrument: FIBA General Statutes
- Formation: 18 June 1932
- First holder: Léon Bouffard
- Website: Official website

The following is a list of presidents of the International Basketball Federation (FIBA /ˈfiːbə/ FEE-bə; French: Fédération Internationale de Basketball), the world basketball governing body.

The current president is Qatari Saud bin Muhammed Al Thani, elected on 23 August 2023, during the 22nd session of the FIBA Congress. Al Thani is the third FIBA President from the FIBA Asia zone after Gonzalo Puyat II, who served from 1976 to 1984, and Carl Men Ky Ching, who served from 2002 to 2006.

== Presidents of FIBA ==
The exact dates of when the FIBA presidents from 1932 to 1998 took and left office are currently unknown. Per the FIBA General Statutes, the geographical alternation for the FIBA Presidency during the 2023–2027 term will be in FIBA Asia.

No.	Portrait	Name (Birth–Death)	Term of office			Country of origin
No.	Portrait	Name (Birth–Death)	Took office	Left office	Time in office	Country of origin
1		Léon Bouffard (1893–1981)	1932	1948		Switzerland
2		Willard N. Greim (1890–1992)	1948	1960		United States
3		Antonio dos Reis Carneiro (1899–1984)	1960	1968		Brazil
4		Abdel Moneim Wahby (1911–1988)	1968	1976		Egypt
5		Gonzalo Puyat II (1933–2013)	1976	1984		Philippines
6		Robert Busnel (1914–1991)	1984	1990		France
7		George E. Killian (1924–2017)	1990	1998		United States
8		Abdoulaye Seye Moreau (1929–2020)	1998	26 August 2002		Senegal
9		Carl Men Ky Ching (born 1940)	26 August 2002	29 August 2006	4 years, 3 days	Hong Kong
10		Robert Elphinston (born 1941)	29 August 2006	6 September 2010	4 years, 8 days	Australia
11	Yvan Mainini	Yvan Mainini (1944–2018)	6 September 2010	28 August 2014	3 years, 356 days	France
12	Victory Ceremony Mens 3x3 Basketball 2018 YOG (3)	Horacio Muratore (1951-2026)	28 August 2014	29 August 2019	5 years, 1 day (Note: The term was reset in 2019, following a decision during an extraordinary congress in Istanbul to move the FIBA Basketball World Cup from 2018 to 2019. Hence, Muratore's term as FIBA President was for the 2014–2019 cycle.)	Argentina
13		Hamane Niang (born 1952)	29 August 2019	23 August 2023	3 years, 359 days	Mali
14		Sheikh Saud Ali Al Thani	23 August 2023	Incumbent	3 years, 15 days	Qatar
