= FIBA Congress =

Page discussing the FIBA World Congress

The FIBA Congress is the supreme legislative body of the International Basketball Federation (French: Fédération Internationale de Basketball), commonly known by the acronym FIBA /ˈfiːbə/. FIBA is the international governing body of basketball.

The Congress takes place every two years. A mid-term congress takes place in the middle of a four-year cycle, an extraordinary congress may be held at any time, within three months of a request to the Secretary-General, with the support of one-fifth of the members of FIBA.

The elective congress takes place at the start and end of a particular four-year cycle, and its functions include the election of the FIBA President and members of its Central Board. Each of the 212 members of FIBA has one vote in the Congress.

== List of congresses ==
MT Mid-Term congress
* Extraordinary Congress

Congress	Year	City	Event	Activities
1st	1932	(Switzerland) Geneva	Separate occasion	The first standardized international rules of basketball was conceived.
??	1948	(United Kingdom) London	1948 Summer Olympics	Establishment of the FIBA Basketball World Cup (then known as the World Basketball Championship) and the appointment of Argentina as the first hosts of the tournament.
??	1952	(Finland) Helsinki	1952 Summer Olympics	Establishment of the FIBA Women's Basketball World Cup (formerly known as the FIBA World Championship for Women).
6th	1960	(Italy) Rome	1960 Summer Olympics	
??	1964	(Japan) Tokyo	1964 Summer Olympics	
??	1968	Mexico City	1968 Summer Olympics	The Oceania Basketball Confederation was recognized as a FIBA zone, later renamed as FIBA Oceania.
??	1974	(Puerto Rico) San Juan	1974 FIBA World Championship	The Philippines was selected as the host of the 1978 FIBA World Championship.
??	1976	(Canada) Montreal	1976 Summer Olympics	
??	1986	(Spain) Madrid	1986 FIBA World Championship	
*	1989	(Germany) Munich	Separate occasion	Lifting of restrictions on professional basketball players participating in international basketball competitions and change of name from Fédération Internationale de Basketball Amateur to Fédération Internationale de Basketball.
16th	1998	(Greece) Athens	1998 FIBA World Championship	The Congress officially recognized the International Wheelchair Basketball Federation (IWBF).
17th	2002	(United States) Indianapolis	2002 FIBA World Championship	
18th	2006	(Japan) Saitama	2006 FIBA World Championship	Bob Elphinston of Australia was elected as the 10th President of the International Basketball Federation. Election of the FIBA Central Board for the 2006–2010 cycle. The Basketball Federation of Montenegro was approved as a member of FIBA.
19th	2010	(Turkey) Istanbul	2010 FIBA World Championship	Yvan Mainini of France was elected as the 11th President of the International Basketball Federation. Election of the Central Board for the 2010–2014 cycle.
*	2014	(Turkey) Istanbul	Separate occasion	Membership of the Central Board was increased from 23 to 29. Establishment of the FIBA Executive Committee. Adoption of new General Statutes and a new FIBA governance structure was approved. The next FIBA Basketball World Cup after the 2014 edition was moved from 2018 to 2019.
20th	2014	(Spain) Seville	2014 FIBA Basketball World Cup	Horacio Muratore of Argentina was elected as the 12th President of the International Basketball Federation. Election of the Central Board for the 2014–2019 cycle. Changes to the General Statutes were approved. Official recognition of the Deaf International Basketball Federation (DIBF) by the Congress.
MT	2017	Hong Kong	Separate occasion	New headgear rules were unanimously approved.
21st	2019	(China) Beijing	2019 FIBA Basketball World Cup	Hamane Niang of Mali was elected as the 13th President of the International Basketball Federation. Election of the Central Board for the 2019–2023 cycle. Amendments to the General Statues were approved.
MT	2021	Online congress (Note: Scheduled as an online event due to the COVID-19 pandemic. The Congress was broadcast live from Mies, Switzerland.)	Separate occasion	Revisions to the General Statutes were approved. Disaffiliation of the Peru Basketball Federation from FIBA.
22nd	2023	(Philippines) Pasay	2023 FIBA Basketball World Cup	Sheikh Saud Ali Al Thani of Qatar was elected as the 14th President of the International Basketball Federation. Election of the Central Board for the 2023–2027 cycle.
MT	2025	(Bahrain) Manama	Separate occasion	
23rd	2027	(Qatar) Doha	2027 FIBA Basketball World Cup	Election of the 15th President of the International Basketball Federation and the Central Board for the 2027–2031 cycle.
