= Carol Callan =

American basketball executive

Career information
- College: William Woods University; University of Colorado Boulder
- Women's Basketball Hall of Fame

Carol Callan (nee Leimer) is an American basketball executive. She is the first female President of the International Basketball Federation (FIBA) Americas and director of the United States women's national basketball team. Under her guidance, she has helped lead the United States to six consecutive Olympic gold medals from 1996 until 2012 and four World Championships. In 2020, Callan was inducted into the Women's Basketball Hall of Fame as a contributor. Callan is a current member of the FIBA Central Board, FIBA's highest executive body.

== Early life and education ==
Callan earned her Bachelor of Arts degree in Mathematics and Physical Education from William Woods University, where she graduated from in 1975. She played one season with the Owls basketball team in 1974, recording an average of 16.75 points per game and totaling 201 points. She then enrolled at the University of Colorado Boulder for a dual Master's degree in business administration and physical education.

== Career ==
Upon graduating from the University of Colorado Boulder (CU), Callan accepted a director of athletics and activities position at Fairview High School from 1986 until 1995 and worked there as an assistant principal for two years. As Fairview High School’s girls’ basketball coach, Callan led them to the 4A State Championship in 1985. During her time at the school, she also sat on the USA Basketball's Executive Committee and chaired the Women's Coach and Player Selection Committee. Callan left Fairview High School in 1995 to accept a paid job at USA Basketball's Colorado Springs-based organization.

As director of the United States women's national basketball team since 1996, she has helped lead the United States to six consecutive Olympic gold medals from 1996 until 2012 and four World Championships. Since her start, the women's national team has a record of 100–1 in World Cup and Olympic competition. She also provided color commentary on CU radio broadcasts and chaired several national team committed including the National Team Steering Committee, National Team Player Selection Committee, and the Developmental National Team Committee for USA Basketball.

In recognition of her efforts, Callan was inducted into the Sportswomen of Colorado Hall of Fame in 2009 and received the 2019 Naismith Outstanding Contributor to Women’s Basketball award. In 2020, she was indicted into the Women's Basketball Hall of Fame as a contributor and became the first female President of the International Basketball Federation (FIBA) Americas.
