= FIBA Central Board =

- Headquarters: Mies, Switzerland
- Official language: English, French
- Secretary General: Andreas Zagklis
- President: Sheikh Saud Ali Al Thani
- First Vice President: David Reid
- Vice President: Jorge Garbajosa
- Vice President: Anibal Manave
- Website: about.fiba.basketball/en/organization/structure/central-board

The FIBA Central Board is an institution of FIBA (the governing body of basketball). It is the highest executive body of the organization, with the role of overseeing basketball globally. A majority of its members are elected by the FIBA Congress, while up to six members may be co-opted.

In addition to presenting reports to the Congress, the Board also appoints the host countries of the FIBA Basketball World Cup and the FIBA Women's Basketball World Cup, and is in charge of appointing the Secretary General, members of the Executive Committee and the different FIBA Commissions.

== Structure ==
Following the 2014 FIBA Extraordinary Congress in Istanbul, FIBA announced a new set of statues that would come into force. These include the increase of Central Board membership from 23 to up to 29 members, including one representative each from the National Basketball Association of the United States and the players association.

The Central Board is currently made up of the following individuals:

- President
- Secretary-General
- Treasurer
- FIBA Africa: one vice-president and two members
- FIBA Americas: four members
- FIBA Asia: three members
- FIBA Europe: one vice-president and four members
- FIBA Oceania: one vice-president and two members
- Up to six co-opted members (Note: For the 2023–2027 term, the Central Board co-opted five members.)
- NBA representative
- Players representative

== Membership ==
The Central Board of the 2023–2027 term was elected during the 22nd FIBA Congress in Pasay, Metro Manila, Philippines before the 2023 FIBA Basketball World Cup. Other members were appointed on 9 September 2023 during the Board's first meeting.

FIBA Central Board composition
President
Sheikh Saud Ali Al Thani; Qatar
Secretary-General
Andreas Zagklis; Greece
Treasurer
Ingo Weiss; Germany
First Vice-President
David Reid; Australia (President of FIBA Oceania)
Vice Presidents
Jorge Garbajosa; Spain (President of FIBA Europe)			Anibal Manave; Mozambique (President of FIBA Africa)		
Members
FIBA Africa	FIBA Americas	FIBA Asia	FIBA Europe	FIBA Oceania	Co-opted members
Jean-Michel Ramaroson; Madagascar	Fabián Borro; Argentina (President of FIBA Americas)	Yao Ming; China	Asterios Zois; Greece	Burton Ross Shipley; New Zealand	Erick Thohir; Indonesia
Pascale Mugwaneza; Rwanda	Yamil Alejandro Bukele Pérez; El Salvador	Kempareddy Govindaraj; India (President of FIBA Asia)	Tor Christian Bakken; Norway	Jubilee Kuartei; Palau	Richard Carrión; Puerto Rico
	Carol Callan; United States	Yuko Mitsuya; Japan	Carmen Tocală; Romania		Alfredo Panlilio; Philippines
	Usie Richards; U.S. Virgin Islands		Matej Erjavec; Slovenia		Andrei Kirilenko; Russia (Note: Kirilenko's appointment will be subject to decisions by FIBA and the International Olympic Committee in relation to the Russo-Ukrainian War.)
					Sonja Vasić; Serbia
NBA representative			Players representative		
Mark Tatum; United States			Dirk Nowitzki; Germany		

== Past Central Boards ==
2019–2023

- (Mali) FIBA President Hamane Niang
- (Qatar) FIBA First Vice President Sheikh Saud Ali Al Thani (President of FIBA Asia)
- FIBA Vice Presidents
  - (New Zealand) Burton Ross Shipley (President of FIBA Oceania)
  - (Turkey) Turgay Demirel (President of FIBA Europe)
- (Greece) FIBA Secretary-General Andreas Zagklis
- (Germany) FIBA Treasurer Ingo Weiss
- (Australia) David Reid
- (Benin) Célestine Adjanohoun
- (Canada) Michelle O'Keefe
- (China) Yao Ming
- (Finland) Antti Zitting
- (France) Jean-Pierre Siutat
- (Greece) Asterios Zois
- (Indonesia) Erick Thohir
- (Japan) Yuko Mitsuya
- (Madagascar) Jean-Michel Ramaroson
- (Mozambique) Anibal Manave (President of FIBA Africa)
- (Papua New Guinea) Karo Lelai
- (Paraguay) Marcelo Bedoya
- (Philippines) Manuel Pangilinan
- (Puerto Rico) Richard Carrión
- (Romania) Carmen Tocală
- (Russia) Andrei Kirilenko (Note: Kirilenko was co-opted in March 2020.)
- (Spain) Jorge Garbajosa (Note: Garbajosa was co-opted in November 2020.)
- (United States) Carol Callan (President of FIBA Americas)
- (United States Virgin Islands) Usie Richards
- (United States) NBA representative Mark Tatum
- (Germany) Players representative Dirk Nowitzki

2014–2019

- (Argentina) FIBA President Horacio Muratore
- (Mali) FIBA First Vice President Hamane Niang (President of FIBA Africa)
- FIBA Vice Presidents
  - (China) Xiao Tian (replaced) (Note: Xiao was suspended by FIBA in 2015 due to an investigation by China's Central Commission for Discipline Inspection implicating him of corruption. He was replaced by Yuko Mitsuya of Japan during the FIBA Mid-Term Congress in 2017.)
  - (Turkey) Turgay Demirel (President of FIBA Europe)
- (Greece) FIBA Secretary-General Andreas Zagklis (appointed on 7 December 2018) (Note: Following the death of Patrick Baumann, Zagklis was appointed Secretary-General of FIBA on 7 December 2018.)
- (Switzerland) FIBA Secretary-General Patrick Baumann (until 13 October 2018) (Note: Baumann died on 13 October 2018 while attending the 2018 Summer Youth Olympics in Buenos Aires, Argentina.)
- (Germany) FIBA Treasurer Ingo Weiss
- (Australia) Steve Smith
- (Belgium) Cyriel Coomans
- (Benin) Célestine Adjanohoun
- (Canada) Michelle O'Keefe
- (France) Jean-Pierre Siutat
- (Greece) Asterios Zois
- (Indonesia) Erick Thohir
- (Japan) Yuko Mitsuya
- (Marshall Islands) Deborah Shoniber
- (Mozambique) Anibal Manave
- (New Zealand) Burton Ross Shipley (President of FIBA Oceania)
- (Paraguay) Marcelo Bedoya
- (Philippines) Manuel Pangilinan
- (Puerto Rico) Richard Carrión
- (Qatar) Sheikh Saud Ali Al Thani (President of FIBA Asia)
- (Russia) Yulia Anikeeva (replaced) (Note: Following her removal from her position as President of the Russian Basketball Federation in 2015 due to corruption allegations which she would eventually be sentenced to jail for, FIBA's Executive Committee decided on 7 June 2016 that there would be a process to replace Anikeeva. She was eventually replaced by Asterios Zois of Greece during the FIBA Mid-Term Congress in 2017.)
- (Spain) José Luis Sáez
- (Sweden) Lena Wallin-Kantzy
- (United States) Jim Tooley
- (United States Virgin Islands) Usie Richards (President of FIBA Americas)
- (United States) NBA representative Mark Tatum
- (Serbia) Players representative Vlade Divac

2010–2014

- (France) FIBA President Yvan Mainini
- (Argentina) FIBA Vice President Horacio Muratore
- (Switzerland) FIBA Secretary-General Patrick Baumann
- (Germany) FIBA Treasurer Manfred Ströher
- (Argentina) Alberto Garcia
- (Australia) Robert Elphinston
- (Australia) Steve Smith
- (Canada) Nar Zanolin
- (China) Xu Lan
- (Democratic Republic of the Congo) Dieudonne Eseka Mabusa
- (Ivory Coast) Alphonse Bilé
- (Iceland) Ólafur Rafnsson
- (Malaysia) Dato' Yeoh Choo Hock
- (Mali) Salamatou Maïga
- (New Zealand) Barbara Wheadon
- (Puerto Rico) Richard Carrión
- (Qatar) Sheikh Saud Ali Al Thani
- (Russia) Sergey Chernov
- (Spain) José Luis Sáez
- (Sweden) Lena Wallin-Kantzy
- (United States) Valerie Ackerman
- (United States Virgin Islands) Usie Richards

2006–2010

- (Australia) FIBA President Robert Elphinston
- (Greece) FIBA Vice President George Vassilakopoulos
- (Switzerland) FIBA Secretary-General Patrick Baumann
- (Germany) FIBA Treasurer Manfred Ströher
- (Australia) Steve Smith
- (Argentina) Horacio Muratore
- (China) Yu Zaiqing
- (Ivory Coast) Alain Ekra
- (Ivory Coast) Alphonse Bilé
- (Dominican Republic) Julio Subero
- (France) Yvan Mainini
- (Hong Kong) Mabel Mun Wai Ching
- (Kuwait) Sheik Fahad Al-Ahmad Alsabah Talal
- (Luxembourg) Marion Grethen
- (Mali) Salamatou Maïga
- (New Zealand) Barbara Wheadon
- (Palau) William Kelderman
- (Puerto Rico) Jenaro Marchand
- (Spain) José Luis Sáez
- (United States) Valerie Ackerman

== FIBA Executive Committee ==
FIBA Executive Committee
- Headquarters: Mies, Switzerland
- Official language: English, French
- Secretary General: Andreas Zagklis
- Chair: Sheikh Saud Ali Al Thani (President of FIBA)
- Treasurer: Ingo Weiss
- Website: about.fiba.basketball/en/organization/structure/executive-committee

The FIBA Executive Committee is a body that exercises the powers of the FIBA Central Board, with roles including the development of strategies in widening basketball's global reach, approving annual budgets and receiving financial updates, and the appointment of host countries for FIBA's international competitions (except the FIBA Basketball World Cup and the FIBA Women's Basketball World Cup). Any decision taken by the committee are to be relayed to the Central Board, as per FIBA's General Statutes.

Members of the Executive Committee are appointed by the Central Board amongst its own members, with the President of FIBA serving as the Chair of the committee. Both the Secretary-General and Treasurer are also members of the body. According to the organization's statutes, six members are to be appointed, with up to two additional individuals appointed upon proposal by the President and the Secretary General.

FIBA's Executive Committee for the 2023–2027 term consists of the following members

- (Qatar) FIBA President Sheikh Saud Ali Al Thani (Chair)
- (Greece) FIBA Secretary-General Andreas Zagklis
- (Germany) FIBA Treasurer Ingo Weiss
- (Argentina) Fabián Borro
- (Australia) David Reid
- (Japan) Yuko Mitsuya
- (Mozambique) Anibal Manave
- (Puerto Rico) Richard Carrión
- (Romania) Carmen Tocală
- (Spain) Jorge Garbajosa
- (United States) Mark Tatum
