= Naismith Trophy =

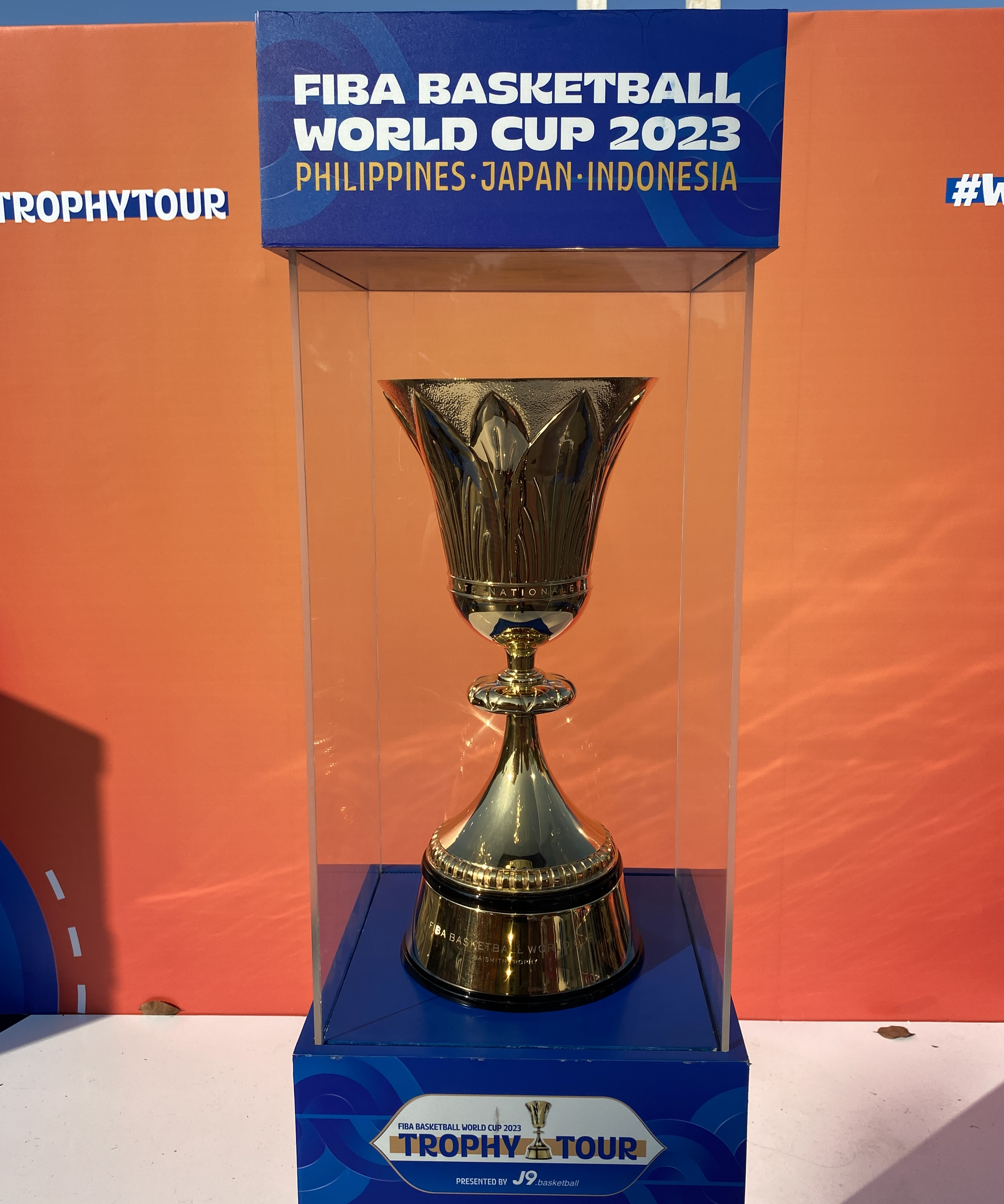
- The redesigned version of the Naismith Trophy introduced in 2017
- Awarded for: Winning the FIBA Basketball World Cup
- Presented by: FIBA
- First award: 1967 (Original trophy); 1998 (remodeled); 2019 (redesign)
- Currently held by: Germany
- Website: FIBA.com

The Naismith Trophy is a trophy awarded to the men's champion of the FIBA Basketball World Cup, and is named in honor of basketball's inventor, James Naismith. The trophy was first awarded to the winner of the 1967 FIBA World Championship. The current version of the trophy was awarded for the first time at the 2019 FIBA Basketball World Cup.

== History ==
As early as the first tournament in 1950, FIBA had decided to name the trophy in honor of Naismith, but did not have the funds to create the trophy. Finally, in 1965, FIBA received a US$1,000 donation and commissioned a trophy. The trophy was introduced at the 1967 tournament, and was awarded to the Soviet Union, which won the first of their three FIBA World Championship titles at the tournament.

The original trophy was remodeled, and a new, updated trophy was introduced for the 1998 FIBA World Championship. The original trophy now sits at the Pedro Ferrándiz Foundation in Spain. The new Naismith Trophy was forged by Goldsmith master Günter Schoebel, who came from Bad Kreuznach, Germany. The design of the trophy was inspired by the travels of long-time FIBA Secretary General Renato William Jones. This version was presented to the World Champions from FR Yugoslavia for the first time following the Finals on 9 August 1998 in Athens.

The top part of the 1998 version of the Naismith Trophy has a lotus flower design. The decagonal rotating middle piece, with carved maps of the continents and precious stones inlaid, symbolizes the five continents. Black onyx, yellow citrine, green chyrsopase, red garnet and blue topaz represent all the regions in the world. Jones was particularly enamored with Egypt; the lotus design was inspired by the Temples of Karnak, and Dr. Naismith's name is engraved on all four sides, in Latin and Arabic scripts, Chinese characters, and Egyptian hieroglyphs.

The 975/1000 sterling silver on the upper and lower parts – gold plated on the inside – and the 14-carat yellow gold middle part, make the cup particularly valuable and precious. The base is made of Rosa Porrino granite, and measures 20 x 20 centimeters (7.9 inches). The top of the cup has a circumference of 21 centimeters (8.3 inches). Standing 47 centimeters tall (18.5 inches), the trophy weighs nine kilograms (20 lb).

A new version of the Naismith Trophy was unveiled on 7 May 2017, during the 2019 FIBA Basketball World Cup Qualifiers Draw Ceremonies. The trophy, which stands about 60 centimeters high (13 cm. higher than the 1998 version), is made almost entirely out of gold, and features the names of the previous world cup champions at the base. FIBA's original name (Federation Internationale de Basketball Amateur) is also engraved at the trophy's "hoop". The trophy was designed by the creative agency Radiant Studios Ltd, and handcrafted by the silversmith Thomas Lyte.

== Winners ==
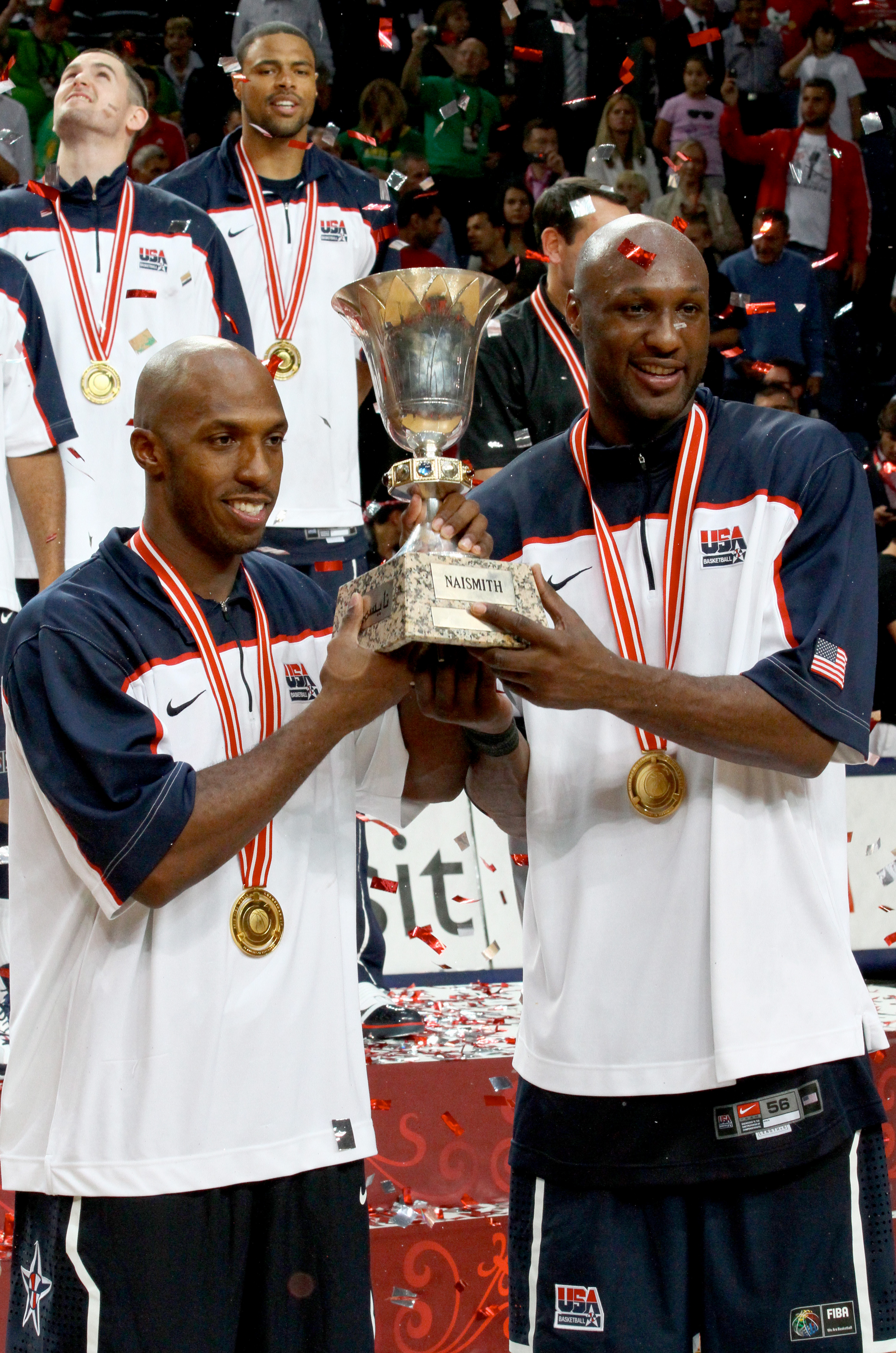
Naismith Trophy in 2010

- Original trophy
  - Soviet Union – 1967, 1974, 1982
  - Yugoslavia – 1970, 1978, 1990
  - United States – 1986, 1994
- Remodel
  - (Federal Republic of Yugoslavia) FR Yugoslavia – 1998, 2002
  - Spain – 2006
  - United States – 2010, 2014
- Redesign
  - Spain – 2019
  - Germany – 2023

== Gallery ==
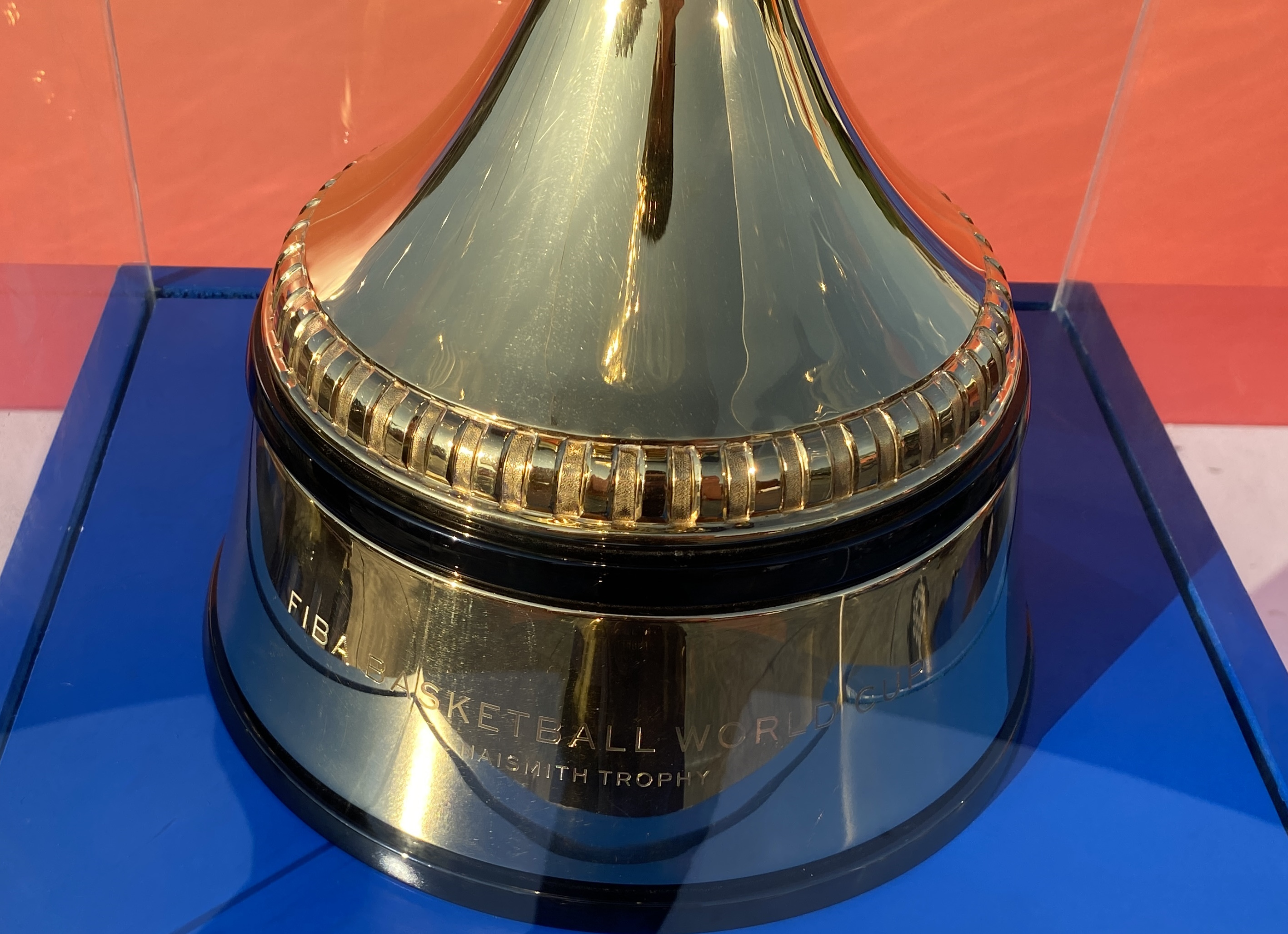
Engraving on the base of the redesigned trophy

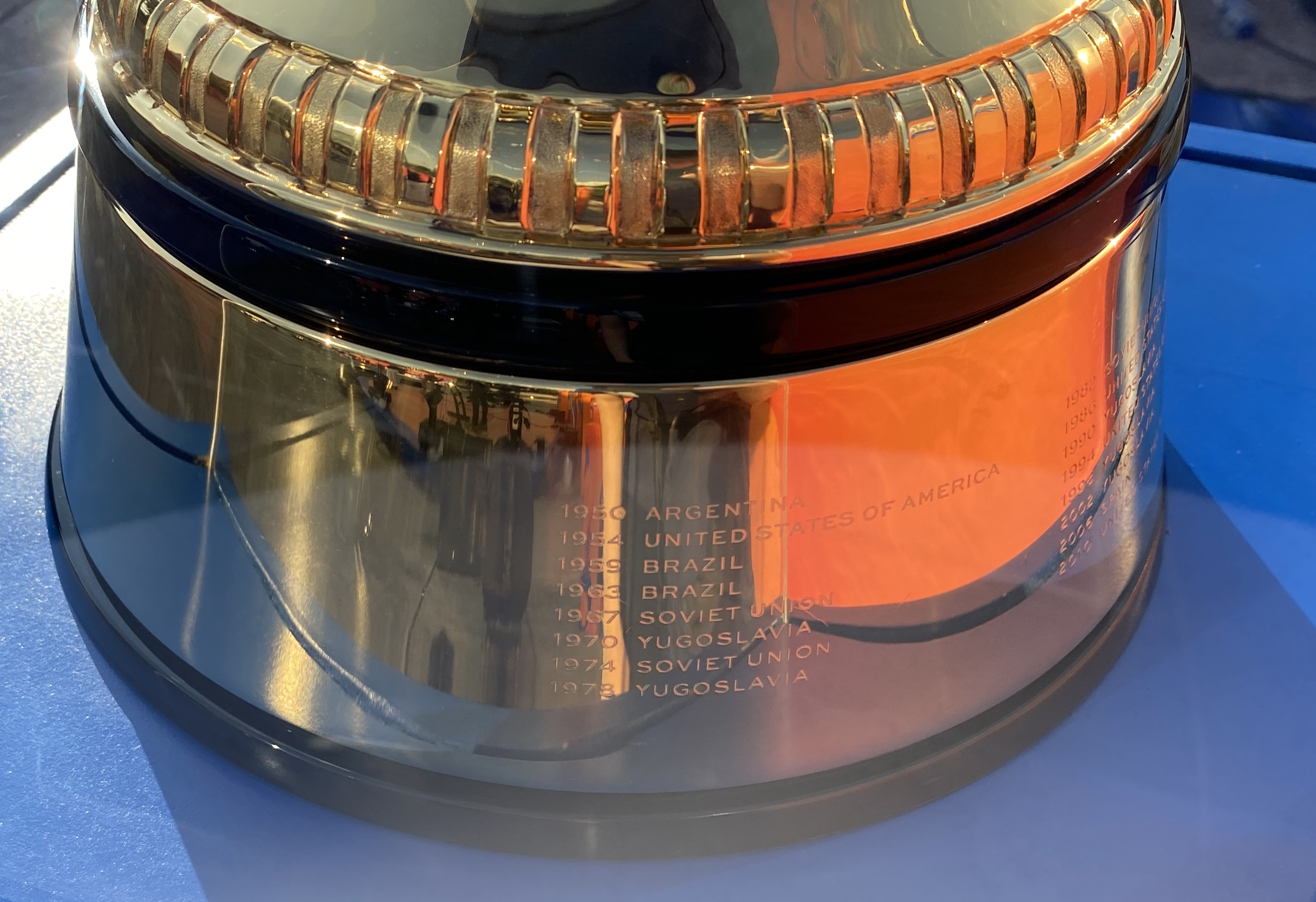
Names of past winners on the redesigned trophy

== See also ==
- FIBA
- FIBA Basketball World Cup
