= Protocol of Stockholm =

Sports agreement

The Protocol of Stockholm (also called Battle of Stockholm) was an agreement between the International Amateur Handball Federation (IAHF) (Note: The IAHF was replaced by the sport's current governing body, the International Handball Federation, in 1946.) and Fédération Internationale de Basketball (then FIBB, now FIBA), made in 1934 to transfer the oversight of basketball from the IAHF to the FIBB.

== Background ==
Basketball was a demonstration sport at the 1904 Summer Olympics. Korfball, a similar sport, was also a demonstration sport at the 1920 and 1928 Summer Olympics.

In 1926 a commission was founded at the International Amateur Athletics Federation (IAAF, now World Athletics) which was responsible for all ball games which were played by hand, including basketball and handball.

Representatives from 11 countries founded the International Amateur Handball Federation (IAHF) on 4 August 1928 in Amsterdam. All ball games which are played by hand were under the umbrella of the IAHF. Basketball had its own technical commission.

At the 1932 Summer Olympics in Los Angeles neither basketball or handball were present. The IAHF wanted to add handball first, but the organising committee didn't want handball included as it was not popular in the United States.

This impasse led Renato William Jones to found the Fédération Internationale de Basketball (then FIB) in Geneva on the 18th June 1932. In the same year they tried to become recognized by the IOC but because they had the same abbreviation FIB as the Federation Internationale de Boxe Amateur, and as the IAHF did not recognize the independence of the FIB the recognition was declined.

In early 1934 the Fédération Internationale de Basketball, now initialed FIBB, sent a request to the International Olympic Committee (IOC) that the FIBB be responsible for basketball. At the 32nd IOC Sessions in Athens on 18 May 1934 the members of the IOC had positive feedback for the request but they decided to wait until the IAHF congress in Stockholm in September for a decision.

In 1931 Franz-Paul Lang resigned as president of the IAHF and Karl Ritter von Halt became interim president. The main focus of the IAHF Congress in Stockholm in 1934 was to manage handball. Handball was first added to the 1936 Summer Olympics so they had to plan for the Olympics, and basketball was not a major part of the congress. The congress saw Karl Ritter von Halt elected as president and Avery Brundage (President of the United States Olympic Committee) as council member.

Secretary General Renato William Jones and president Giorgio di San Marzano of the FIBB were not invited. Nevertheless, they traveled to the congress. Secretary General of the IAHF Hassler didn't mind their presence. He offered them that basketball would be a demonstration sport at the 1936 Summer Olympics and further questions about the FIBB would be discussed by the IAHF technical commission in 1935.

== Negotiation ==
It was a strange situation for Brundage because the USA were not part of the FIBB yet he had to stand up for the FIBB. The USA would only join the FIBB if the FIBB was recognized in Europe. Von Halt offered the FIBB that members of the FIBB would be part of the IAHF basketball commission. Brundage suggested that the FIBB council should have three IAHF and three FIBB members. Jones rejected this as he wanted an independent federation.

Jones said that "since you are together in Stockholm, the question should be decided immediately and suggests that 2 members from each federation meet after the congress". This proposal was accepted. The IAHF named president Karl Ritter von Halt and Tadeusz Kuchar as their representatives and the negotiation was set for the next day. Secretary General Hassler had the last chance to talk against the recognition of the FIBB. He read out an opinion of France against the FIBB, but he could not stop the process.

On 1. September 1934 the delegates of the IAHF (Karl Ritter von Halt and Tadeusz Kuchar) and of the FIBB (Renato William Jones and Giorgio di San Marzano) needed only 20 minutes for the final contract. Observers were Dan J. Ferris (Amateur Athletic Union/USA) and Berthold Leo Werner (Austrian Handball Federation/Austria). Renato William Jones called the negotiation the "Battle of Stockholm".

== The Protocol ==
1. Acting upon the decision taken by the IIId congress of the I.A.H.F. held in Stockholm on August 31st 1934, which gave to the president and to a delegate the power to come to an agreement with the representatives of the International Basketball Federation (F.I.B.B.), the following points were accepted by the undersigned unanimously.
2. The I.A.H.F. renounces for ever to the mandate on Basketball and recognizes as the only ruling power on this game the F.I.B.B., with the understanding, that the latter is to rule Basketball only. The I.A.H.F. and the F.I.B.B. will notify this decision to the I.O.C. and to the Bureau Permanent des Fédérations Sportives Internationales.
3. All national federations ruling Basketball only, are to be members of the F.I.B.B., to whom they will pay their fees. Those federations, which rule several branches of Handball, including Basketball, will go on paying their fees to the I.A.H.F. and the F.I.B.B. will recognize them as full-fledged members, if Basketball is actually played under their ruling.
4. The strictest collaboration is promised by both parties. One delegate of the F.I.B.B. is to sit with right of vote in the I.A.H.F.’s Board and vice versa. The constitutions of both federations will be modified to provide for this. These two delegates will deal in particular with all questions concerning this collaboration.
5. The general assemblies and in general all meetings of a universal character of the two federations will take place at about the same time and the same place.
6. Both federations agree to assist each other in the furtherance of the respective interests on the international plan.

== Reactions ==
After the protocol was signed Germany, Austria, Egypt, Estonia, Poland and the United States joined the FIBB.

Marcel Barille, president of the Fédération Française de Basketball (FFBB), was consternated that France had not helped with the treaty, but he congratulated Jones and di San Marzano.

== Confirmation by the IOC ==
At the 33rd IOC Sessions in Oslo on 28 February 1935 the Fédération Internationale de Basketball was recognized as the governing body for basketball.

== Literature ==
- di San Marzano, Giorgio; Jones, Renato William; Ritter von Halt, Karl; Kuchar, Tadeusz; Ferris, Daniel J.; Werner, Berthold Leo (1 September 1934). "Protocol" (PDF; 2,3 MB). Stockholm: International Amateur Handball Federation & Fédération Internationale de Basketball. Archived (PDF) from the original on 14 June 2020.
- Jones, Renato William (14 September 1934). "Letter from Jones to Bouffard" (PDF; 2 MB) (in French and English). Fédération Internationale de Basketball. Archived (PDF) from the original on 14 June 2020.
- Priebe, Alexander (December 2008). Written at Odenwaldschule. "Wie das amerikanische Basketballspiel im nationalsozialistischen Deutschland olympisch wurde" [How American basketball became Olympic in Nazi Germany] (PDF; 211 KB). German Journal of Exercise and Sport Research (in German). 38 (4). Berlin: Springer Science+Business Media: 380–391. doi:10.1007/BF03217043. eISSN 2509-3142. ISSN 2509-3150. OCLC 969594964. S2CID 144570633. Springer:BF03217043.
- Krebs, Hans-Dieter [in German] (28 June 2009). Written at Bergheim. "Wie das Basketballspiel olympisch wurde" [How basketball became Olympic] (PDF; 125 KB). German Journal of Exercise and Sport Research (in German). 39 (2). Berlin: Springer Science+Business Media: 168–169. doi:10.1007/s12662-009-0038-y. eISSN 2509-3142. ISSN 2509-3150. OCLC 969594964. S2CID 140302384. Springer:s12662-009-0038-y.
- Krebs, Hans-Dieter (April 2010). "Basketball's long Journey into the Olympic Programm" (PDF; 205 KB). Journal of Olympic History. 18 (1). International Society of Olympic Historians: 30–32.
