= 1970 in basketball =

The following are the basketball events of the year 1970 throughout the world.

The following are the basketball events of the year 1970 throughout the world. Tournaments include international (FIBA), professional (club) and amateur and collegiate levels.

== Player awards ==
=== American Basketball Association ===
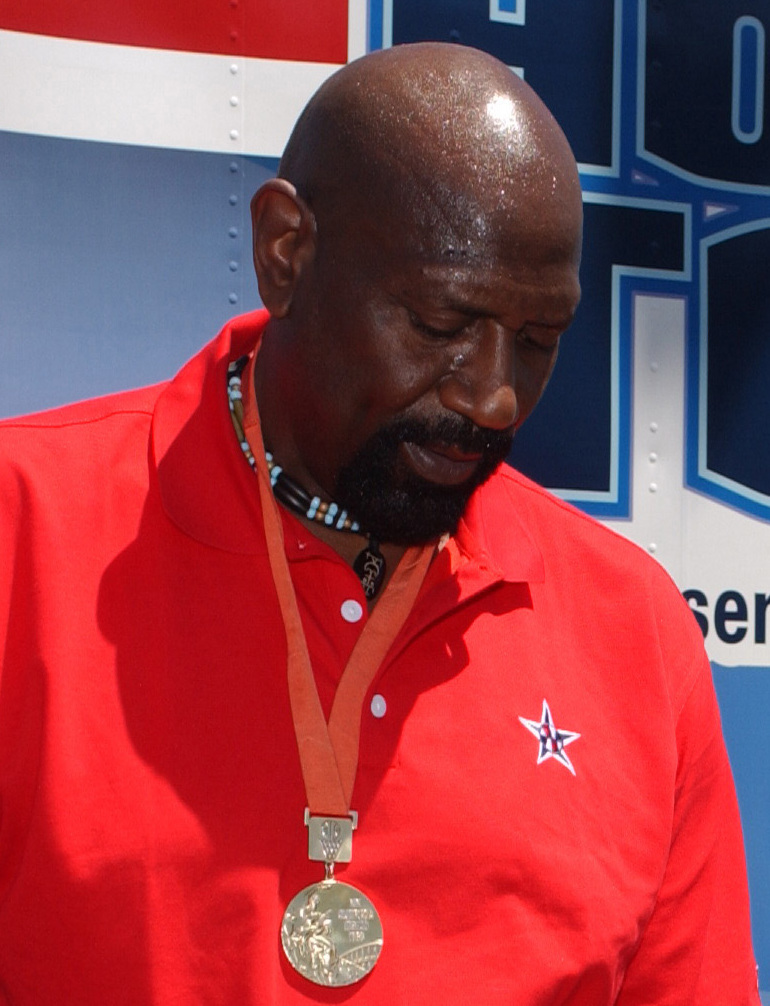
Spencer Haywood was named the Most Valuable Player for the 1969–70 ABA season and the Most Valuable Player for the 1970 ABA All-Star Game.

ABA Most Valuable Player Award

- Spencer Haywood (Denver Rockets)

ABA All-Star Game Most Valuable Player

- Spencer Haywood (Denver Rockets)

ABA Playoffs Most Valuable Player Award

- Roger Brown (Indiana Pacers)

ABA Rookie of the Year Award

- Spencer Haywood (Denver Rockets)

=== National Basketball Association ===
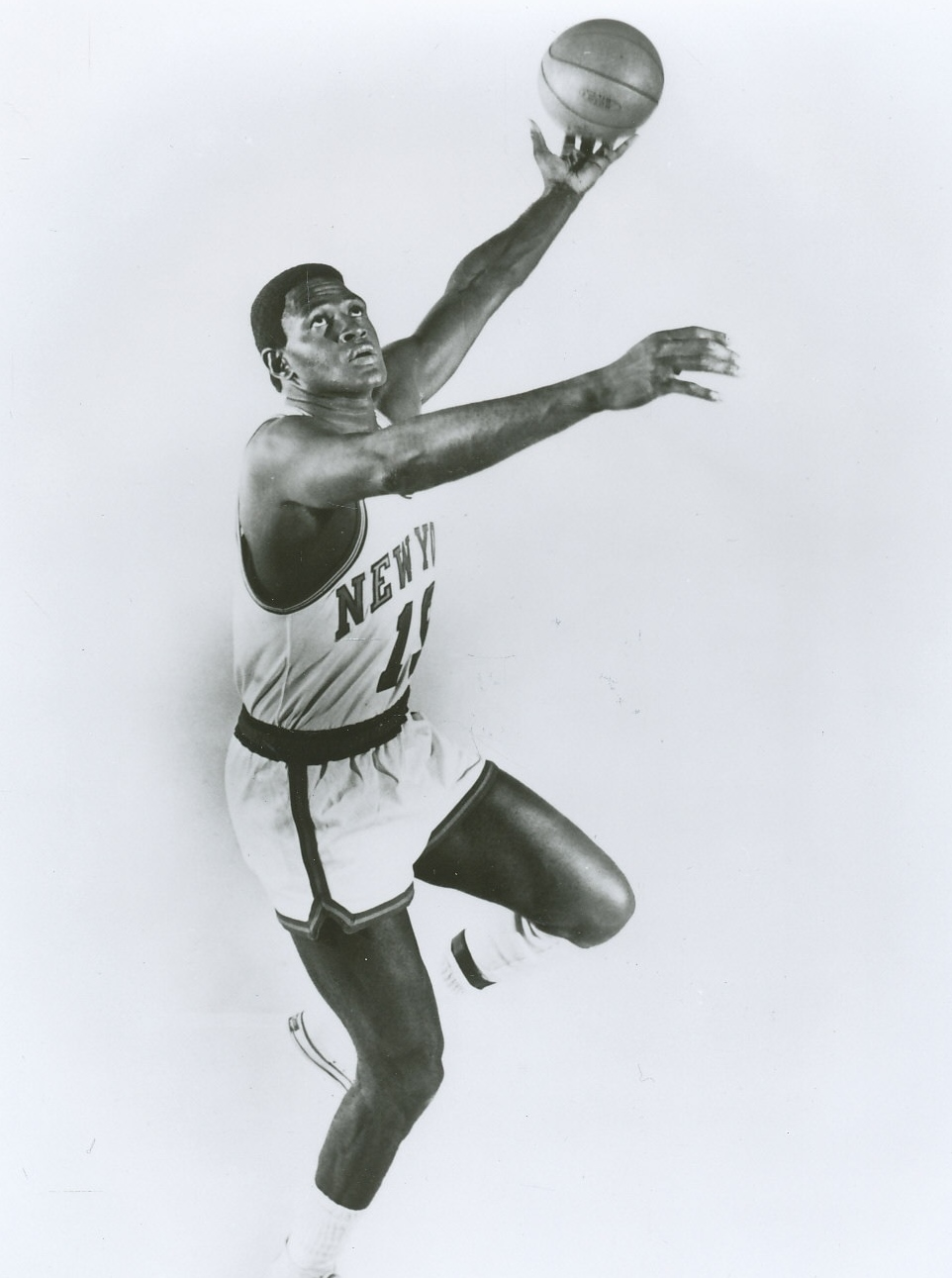
Willis Reed was named the NBA Most Valuable Player, NBA All-Star Game Most Valuable Player and the NBA Finals Most Valuable Player in 1970.

NBA Most Valuable Player Award

- Willis Reed (New York Knicks)

NBA All-Star Game Most Valuable Player

- Willis Reed (New York Knicks)

NBA Finals Most Valuable Player Award

- Willis Reed (New York Knicks)

NBA Rookie of the Year Award

- Lew Alcindor (Milwaukee Bucks)

=== NAIA ===
NAIA Basketball Tournament Most Valuable Player

- Greg Hyder (Eastern New Mexico)

=== NCAA ===
Naismith College Player of the Year

- Pete Maravich (LSU)

Helms Foundation College Basketball Player of the Year

- Pete Maravich (LSU)
- Sidney Wicks (UCLA)

Associated Press College Basketball Player of the Year

- Pete Maravich (LSU)

UPI College Basketball Player of the Year

- Pete Maravich (LSU)

USBWA College Player of the Year

- Pete Maravich (LSU)

Sporting News Men's College Basketball Player of the Year

- Pete Maravich (LSU)

Haggerty Award

- Charlie Yelverton (Fordham)

Robert V. Geasey Trophy

- Ken Durrett (La Salle)

NCAA basketball tournament Most Outstanding Player

- Sidney Wicks (UCLA)

Atlantic Coast Conference Men's Basketball Player of the Year

- John Roche (South Carolina)

Big Eight Conference Men's Basketball Player of the Year

- Dave Robisch (Kansas)

Mid-American Conference Men's Basketball Player of the Year

- Ken Kowall (Ohio)

Missouri Valley Conference Men's Basketball Player of the Year

- Jim Ard (Cincinnati)

Ohio Valley Conference Men's Basketball Player of the Year

- Jim McDaniels (Western Kentucky)

Pacific Coast Athletic Association Men's Basketball Player of the Year

- George Trapp (Long Beach State)

Southeastern Conference Men's Basketball Player of the Year

- Pete Maravich (LSU)

Southland Conference Men's Basketball Player of the Year

- Kenny Haynes (Lamar)

Southern Conference Men's Basketball Player of the Year

- Mike Maloy (Davidson)

Southwest Conference Men's Basketball Player of the Year

- Gene Phillips (SMU)

West Coast Conference Men's Basketball Player of the Year

- Dennis Awtrey (Santa Clara)

=== NCAA College Division ===
NCAA College Division basketball tournament Most Outstanding Player

- Ted McClain (Tennessee State)

=== Eastern Professional Basketball League ===
EPBL Most Valuable Player

- Waite Bellamy (Wilmington Blue Bombers)

== ABA ==
- 1969-70 ABA season
- 1970-71 ABA season
- 1970 ABA All-Star Game
- 1970 ABA Playoffs

== NBA ==
- 1970 NBA draft
- 1970 NBA Finals
- 1970 NBA Playoffs
- 1970 NBA All-Star Game
- 1969–70 NBA season
- 1970–71 NBA season

== FIBA ==
- 1970 FIBA Intercontinental Cup
- FIBA Africa Championship 1970
- 1969–70 FIBA European Champions Cup
- 1970 FIBA World Championship
- 1970–71 FIBA European Cup Winners' Cup

== NAIA ==
- 1970 NAIA Basketball Tournament

== NCAA ==
- 1970 National Invitation Tournament
- 1970 NCAA Division II men's basketball tournament
- 1970 NCAA Division I men's basketball tournament

== Women's tournaments ==
- 1970 ABC Championship for Women
- EuroBasket 1970 Women
- 1970 ABC Under-18 Championship for Women

== International Competition ==
- Basketball at the 1970 Asian Games
- Basketball at the 1970 Summer Universiade

== Naismith Memorial Basketball Hall of Fame ==
- Class of 1970:
  - Ben Carnevale
  - Bob Davies

== Deaths ==
- January 2 — Edgar Diddle, American college coach (Western Kentucky) (born 1895)
- April 6 — Maurice Stokes, American NBA player (Cincinnati Royals) (born 1933)
- April 29 — Forrest DeBernardi, American Hall of Fame player (born 1899)
- May 27 — Trajko Rajković, Yugoslav professional and Olympic player (born 1937)
- June 4 — Branch McCracken, American Hall of Fame college coach (Indiana Hoosiers) (born 1908)
- August 10 — Joe Lapchick, American Hall of Fame player (Original Celtics) and coach (St. John's, New York Knicks) (born 1900)

== Births ==
- February 8 - Alonzo Mourning, American NBA player and a Hall of Famer
- May 9 - Doug Christie, American NBA player
- September 3 - George Lynch, American NBA player
- September 8 - Latrell Sprewell, American NBA player
- October 9 - Kenny Anderson, American NBA player
- November 14 - David Wesley, American NBA player
