= Basketball Champions League =

European basketball tournament

FIBA Champions League
- Organising body: FIBA Europe
- Founded: 21 March 2016; 10 years ago
- First season: 2016–17
- Region: Europe
- Number of teams: 32 (regular season); 56 (total)
- Level on pyramid: 1
- International cup: FIBA Intercontinental Cup
- Related competitions: FIBA Europe Cup
- Current champions: (Lithuania) Rytas (1st title) (2025–26)
- Most championships: (Spain) Canarias (Spain) San Pablo Burgos (Spain) Unicaja Malaga (2 titles each)
- TV partners: courtside1891.basketball
- Website: championsleague.basketball
- 2026–27 Basketball Champions League

Basketball Champions League ball

The Basketball Champions League (BCL), also commonly known as the FIBA Champions League, is an annual professional basketball competition for European clubs, organised by FIBA. It is the top-level competition organised by FIBA Europe, therefore the champion participates in the FIBA Intercontinental Cup.

Clubs qualify for the competition mostly based on performance in their national leagues and cup competitions. Although exceptional, some teams can be wildcarded.

Each season consists of 32 teams. The inaugural season was held in 2016–17 and since then five different clubs won the competition. Canarias, San Pablo Burgos and Malaga hold the joint record of most BCL titles with two each.

== Creation and adoption ==
In October 2015, FIBA attempted to take back control of Europe's top-tier club competition, by proposing a new competition, featuring 16 clubs playing in a round-robin format. The top European clubs decided to remain in the Euroleague Basketball and adopt the same format, with 11 permanent out of 16 spots. FIBA then announced the launch of a new European basketball club competition, with qualification based only on sporting merit. In April 2023, the league established the Youth Basketball Champions League (YBCL) for under-18 BCL clubs.

== Format ==
=== Tournament ===
The tournament proper begins with a regular season of 32 clubs divided into 4 groups. Seeding is used and clubs from the same country don't together. Games are held in a round-robin format. The top 4 from each group progress to the play-offs.

The regular season is played from October to January, and the playoffs start in February. In the round of 16 and quarter-finals, ties are played in a home and away format, based on aggregate scores. For the round of 16, the winner from one group plays against the fourth-placed from another group, and the runner-up against the third-placed from another group. The Final Four is typically held in the final week of April or the first week of May.

=== Arena rules ===
Currently, the minimum seating capacity for home arenas of the clubs that compete in the Basketball Champions League (BCL) is 3,000 seats. However, the Basketball Champions League organizing body has the authority to grant clubs with smaller arenas a waiver of the rule.

== Prizes ==
=== Trophy ===
The current trophy is 65 cm (26 in) tall and made of sterling silver with 24ct gold plated highlights, weighing 8 kg (18 lb). It was designed by Radiant Studios and crafted by Thomas Lyte. A net forms the focus of the trophy, and the design creates the effect of a crown.

=== Prize money ===
From 2016–17 to 2017–18, FIBA reduced the overall prize money from €5,200,000 to €3,500,000, but doubled the winner's prize to €1,000,000. As of 2017–18, FIBA awards a base fee of €50,000 for reaching the regular season. In addition, FIBA pays clubs reaching the round of 16 €20,000, each quarter-finalist €30,000, €40,000 for the fourth-placed, €100,000 for the third-placed, €300,000 for the runners-up, and €900,000 for the winners.

== Results ==
Year	Final			Third and fourth place		
Year	Winners	Score	Second place	Third place	Score	Fourth place
2016–17; Details	(Spain); La Laguna Tenerife	63–59	(Turkey); Banvit	(France); Monaco	91–77	(Italy); Reyer Venezia
2017–18; Details	(Greece); AEK	100–94	(France); Monaco	(Spain); UCAM Murcia	85–74	(Germany); Ludwigsburg
2018–19; Details	(Italy); Virtus Bologna	73–61	(Spain); La Laguna Tenerife	(Belgium); Antwerp Giants	72–58	(Germany); Bamberg Baskets
2019–20; Details	(Spain); San Pablo Burgos	85–74	(Greece); AEK	(France); JDA Dijon	70–65	(Spain); Zaragoza
2020–21; Details	(Spain); San Pablo Burgos	64–59	(Turkey); Karşıyaka	(Spain); Zaragoza	89–77	(France); SIG Strasbourg
2021–22; Details	(Spain); La Laguna Tenerife	98–87	(Spain); BAXI Manresa	(Germany); Ludwigsburg	88–68	(Israel); Hapoel Holon
2022–23; Details	(Germany); Telekom Bonn	77–70	(Israel); Hapoel Jerusalem	(Spain); La Laguna Tenerife	84–79	(Spain); Unicaja Málaga
2023–24; Details	(Spain); Unicaja Málaga	80–75	(Spain); La Laguna Tenerife	(Spain); UCAM Murcia	87–84	(Greece); Peristeri
2024–25; Details	(Spain); Unicaja Málaga	83–67	(Turkey); Galatasaray	(Greece); AEK	77–73	(Spain); La Laguna Tenerife
2025–26; Details	(Lithuania); Rytas Vilnius	92–86	(Greece); AEK	(Spain); Unicaja Málaga	85–80	(Spain); La Laguna Tenerife

== Performances by club ==
Map of countries, clubs reaching the regular season of the Basketball Champions League. Country that has been represented in the regular season Country that has been represented in the qualifying rounds Not represented

Over a hundred clubs from 28 national associations have played in or qualified for the Champions League group stage.

Club	Winners	Runners-up	Years won	Years runner-up
(Spain) Tenerife	2	2	2017, 2022	2019, 2024
(Spain) Unicaja Malaga	2	0	2024, 2025	–
(Spain) San Pablo Burgos	2	0	2020, 2021	–
(Greece) AEK	1	2	2018	2020, 2026
(Italy) Virtus Bologna	1	0	2019	–
(Germany) Baskets Bonn	1	0	2023	–
(Lithuania) Rytas Vilnius	1	0	2026	–
(Turkey) Bandırma	0	1	–	2017
(France) Monaco	0	1	–	2018
(Turkey) Karşıyaka	0	1	–	2021
(Spain) Manresa	0	1	–	2022
(Israel) Hapoel Jerusalem	0	1	–	2023
(Turkey) Galatasaray	0	1	–	2025

== Medals (2016–present) ==
Rank	Nation	Gold	Silver	Bronze	Total
1	Spain	6	3	5	14
2	Greece	1	2	1	4
3	Germany	1	0	1	2
4	Italy	1	0	0	1
4	Lithuania	1	0	0	1
6	Turkey	0	3	0	3
7	France	0	1	2	3
8	Israel	0	1	0	1
9	Belgium	0	0	1	1
Totals (9 entries)		10	10	10	30

== Broadcasting rights ==
Country/Region	Broadcaster	Free/Pay	Ref.
International	YouTube	Free	
International	LiveBasketball.TV	Pay	
International	ESPN3	Pay	
Balkans	Arena Sport		
Balkans	Alternativna TV	Free	
Austria	DAZN	Pay	
Spain (Note: Only games of Spanish teams.)	DAZN	Pay	
Switzerland	DAZN	Pay	
Germany	DYN	Pay	
Estonia	TV3 Group	Free & Pay	
France	Canal+, LNB.TV	Pay	
Greece	Cosmote TV	Pay	
Hungary	M4 Sport	Free	
Israel	Sports Channel	Free & Pay	
Italy	Eurosport	Pay	
Latvia	TV3 Group	Free & Pay	
Lithuania	TV3 Group	Free & Pay	
Poland	Canal+ Premium	Pay	
Romania	Look Sport	Free	
Turkey	Tivibu Spor	Free & Pay	
Vietnam	VTVCab		

== Awards ==
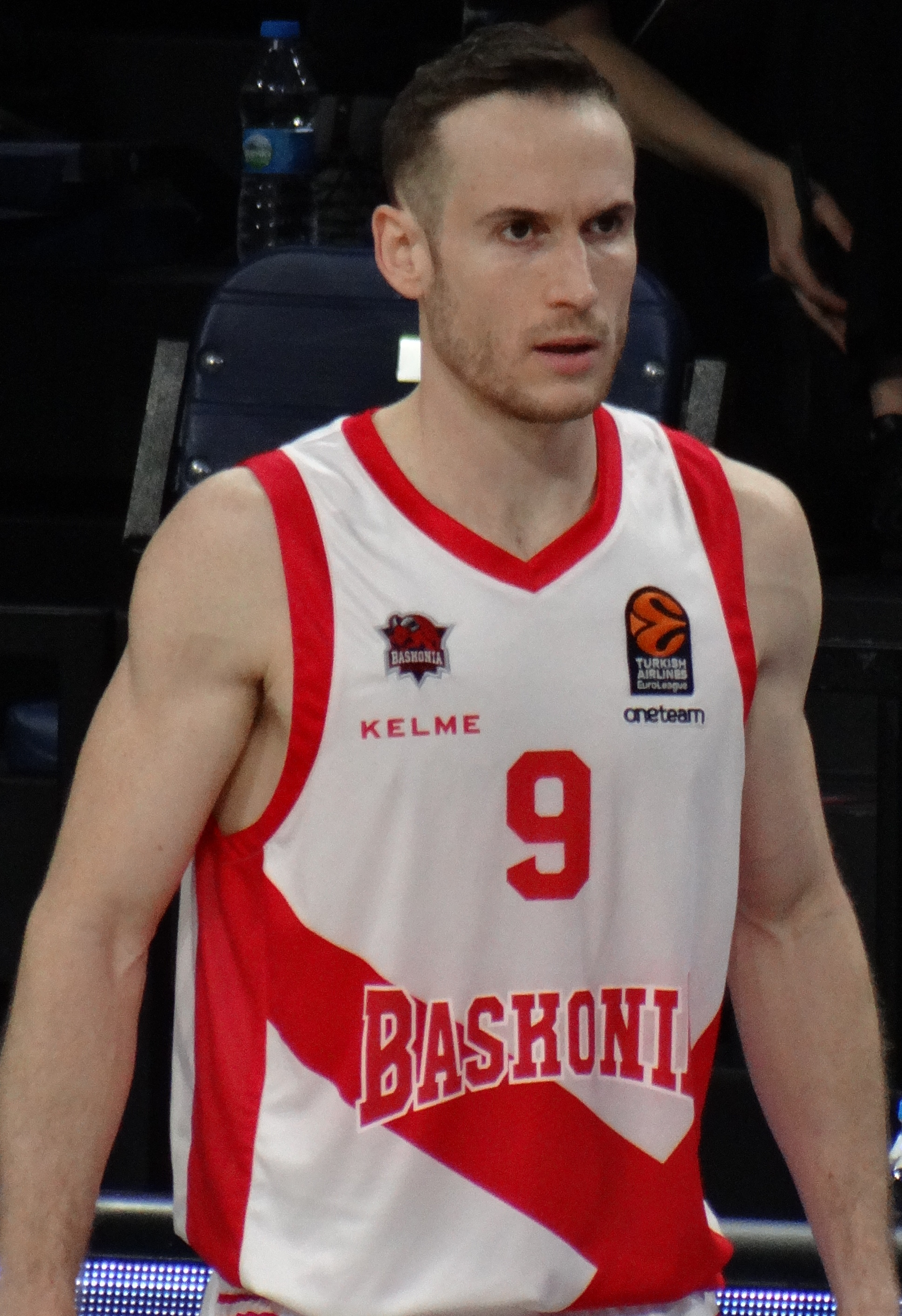
Marcelo Huertas was the FIBA Champions League Final Four MVP in 2022.

== Winning coaches and captains ==
Year	Coach	Team	Captain
2017	(Spain) Txus Vidorreta	Iberostar Tenerife	(Argentina) Nicolás Richotti
2018	(Serbia) Dragan Šakota	AEK BC	(Greece) Dušan Šakota
2019	(Serbia) Aleksandar Đorđević	Virtus Bologna	(Italy) Pietro Aradori
2020	(Spain) Joan Peñarroya	CB San Pablo Burgos	(Brazil) Vítor Benite
2021	(Spain) Joan Peñarroya (2)	CB San Pablo Burgos	(Brazil) Vítor Benite (2)
2022	(Spain) Txus Vidorreta (2)	Iberostar Tenerife	(Brazil) Marcelinho Huertas
2023	(Finland) Tuomas Iisalo	Telekom Baskets Bonn	(Germany) Karsten Tadda
2024	(Spain) Ibon Navarro	Unicaja Malaga	(Spain) Alberto Díaz
2025	(Spain) Ibon Navarro (2)	Unicaja Malaga	(Spain) Alberto Díaz (2)
2026	(Lithuania) Giedrius Žibėnas	Rytas Vilnius	(Lithuania) Artūras Gudaitis

== Youth competition ==
In January 2023, the BCL launched its under-18 competition named the Youth Basketball Champions League (YBCL). The inaugural season was hosted in the Turkish city of Bursa and featured 10 clubs. The winners of the inaugural season were Igokea.

== See also ==
=== Men's competitions ===
- FIBA Europe Cup
- EuroLeague
- EuroCup Basketball

=== Women's competitions ===
- EuroLeague Women
- EuroCup Women
- FIBA Europe SuperCup Women

== Sources ==
- European champions
