= FIBA =

International basketball governing body

- Fédération Internationale de Basketball
- Abbreviation: FIBA
- Predecessor: International Amateur Handball Federation
- Formation: 18 June 1932; 94 years ago
- Founded at: Geneva, Switzerland
- Type: Sports federation
- Headquarters: Global office: Mies, Switzerland; Continental offices: Abidjan, Ivory Coast (Africa); Miami, United States (Americas); Beirut, Lebanon (Asia); Munich, Germany (Europe); Southport, Queensland, Australia (Oceania)
- Members: 212 national federations
- Official languages: English; French
- President: Sheikh Saud Ali Al Thani
- Secretary-General: Andreas Zagklis
- Subsidiaries: FIBA Africa; FIBA Americas; FIBA Asia; FIBA Europe; FIBA Oceania
- Revenue: US$125.8 million (2024)
- Expenses: US$117.6 million (2024)
- Website: www.fiba.basketball

The International Basketball Federation (FIBA /ˈfiːbə/ FEE-bə; French: Fédération Internationale de Basketball) (Note: Originally known as the Fédération internationale de basketball amateur (hence FIBA), in 1989 it dropped the word amateur from its name but retained the acronym.) is an association of national organizations which governs the sport of basketball worldwide. FIBA defines the rules of basketball, specifies the equipment and facilities required, organizes international competitions, regulates the transfer of athletes across countries, and controls the appointment of international referees. A total of 212 national federations are members, organized since 1989 into five zones: Africa, Americas, Asia, Europe, and Oceania.

FIBA organizes both the men's and women's FIBA World Olympic Qualifying Tournament and the Summer Olympics Basketball Tournament, which are sanctioned by the International Olympic Committee (IOC). The FIBA Basketball World Cup is a world tournament for men's national teams held every four years. Teams compete for the Naismith Trophy, named in honor of basketball's Canadian-American creator James Naismith. The tournament structure is similar but not identical to that of the FIFA World Cup in association football; these tournaments occurred in the same year from 1970 through 2014, but starting in 2019, the Basketball World Cup moved to the year following the FIFA World Cup. A parallel event for women's teams, the FIBA Women's Basketball World Cup, is also held quadrennial; from 1986 through 2014, it was held in the same year as the men's event but in a different country.

== History ==
=== Founding and early years (1932–1949) ===
The association was founded in Geneva in 1932, two years after the sport was officially recognized by the IOC. Before 1934, basketball was under the umbrella of the International Amateur Handball Federation. Its original name was Fédération Internationale de basket-ball amateur. The eight nations' basketball federations that were the founding members of FIBA were: Argentina, Czechoslovakia, Greece, Italy, Latvia, Portugal, Romania, and Switzerland. In September 1934, the Protocol of Stockholm was passed and the FIBA became the only recognized authority responsible for basketball. During the 1936 Summer Olympics held in Berlin, the Federation named James Naismith (1861–1939), the founder of basketball, as its Honorary President.

=== Development (1950–2019) ===
FIBA has organized a world championship, known as World Cup, for men since 1950 and a women's world championship, known as the Women's World Cup, since 1953. From 1986 through 2014, both events were held every four years, alternating with the Olympics. The men's World Cup was moved to a new four-year cycle, with tournaments in the year before the Summer Olympics, after 2014.

On 7 April 1989, at a special congress in Munich following the conclusion of the 1988–89 FIBA European Cup, FIBA member nations voted, by a margin of 56 to 13, to allow NBA players to participate in its international events, including the World Cup and the Olympics. The change also intended to ward off competition from the Goodwill Games, which was rivaling the Olympics at the time and also seeking to bring NBA players into its basketball events.

The Federation headquarters moved to Munich in 1956, then returned to Geneva in 2002. In 1991, it founded the FIBA Hall of Fame; the first induction ceremony was held on 12 September 2007, during EuroBasket 2007. During its 81st anniversary in 2013, FIBA moved into its new headquarters, "The House of Basketball", at Mies. Andreas Zagklis became the Secretary-General of FIBA on 7 December 2018.

=== Suspensions of Russia and Belarus (2020–present) ===
In February 2022, Russia and Belarus were provisionally suspended from international competitions until further notice due to Russia's invasion of Ukraine. It also suspended the two countries from hosting any competitions.

=== Presidents ===
Presidents of FIBA
Years	Name
1932–1948	(Switzerland) Leon Bouffard
1948–1960	(United States) Willard Greim
1960–1968	(Brazil) Antonio dos Reis Carneiro
1968–1976	(Egypt) Abdel Moneim Wahby
1976–1984	(Philippines) Gonzalo Puyat II
1984–1990	(France) Robert Busnel
1990–1998	(United States) George E. Killian
1998–2002	(Senegal) Abdoulaye Seye Moreau
2002–2006	(Hong Kong) Carl Men Ky Ching
2006–2010	(Australia) Robert Elphinston
2010–2014	(France) Yvan Mainini
2014–2019	(Argentina) Horacio Muratore
2019–2023	(Mali) Hamane Niang
2023–present	(Qatar) Sheikh Saud Ali Al Thani

During the 1936 Summer Olympics, the FIBA honored James A. Naismith, the founder of basketball, as their honorary President.

=== Secretaries General ===
Secretaries General of FIBA
Years	Name
1932–1976	(United Kingdom) Renato William Jones
1976–2003	(Socialist Federal Republic of Yugoslavia) / (Serbia and Montenegro) Borislav Stanković
2003–2018	(Switzerland) Patrick Baumann
2018–present	(Greece) Andreas Zagklis

== Structure ==
=== Background ===
Until the 1990s FIBA had various continental sub-confederations under its jurisdiction. Those were as follows:

- Africa (AFABA)
- Asia (A.B.C.)
- Confederación Panamericana de Baloncesto (COPABA)
- South American Basketball Confederation (CONSUBASQUET)
- Europe (Standing Conference for Europe)
- Oceania (O.B.C.)

=== Five zones and 211 national federations ===
FIBA divides the world into 5 zones, each roughly based on a continent.

There are five zones, in which FIBA oversees the game in the different continents and regions of the world through its regional offices under its new governance structure, which was approved by the 2014 FIBA Extraordinary Congress in Istanbul. National federations are members of FIBA and are provided for in FIBA's General Statutes with their assigned zones. The Statutes also state that upon a national federation's admission into FIBA, it is assigned to a zone by the Central Board.

- FIBA Africa (54 members)
- FIBA Americas (42 members)
- FIBA Asia (44 members)
- FIBA Europe (49 members)
- FIBA Oceania (22 members)

FIBA recognizes 211 national federations; see the list of men's national basketball teams and the list of women's national basketball teams. Unlike other sports organizations, FIBA recognizes the British Basketball Federation as the lone governing body for basketball in Great Britain, as a result of a merger in 2016 between the basketball federations of two of the four Home Nations within the United Kingdom (England and Scotland). Wales had rejected the proposed merger in 2012 but agreed in 2015. Several members of FIBA Oceania, notably Australia and New Zealand, also compete in Asian tournaments.

In 2021, Peru was disaffiliated from FIBA after being suspended in 2018.

The FIBA Men's World Ranking and FIBA Women's World Ranking are both updated after a FIBA competition or qualification window and are based on their performance, particularly in games, in those events. The men's ranking was updated on 10 September 2023 after the 2023 FIBA Basketball World Cup, while the latest women's ranking was updated on 21 August 2023 after the FIBA Women's Continental Cups, which took place in all FIBA zones.

=== Laws and governance ===
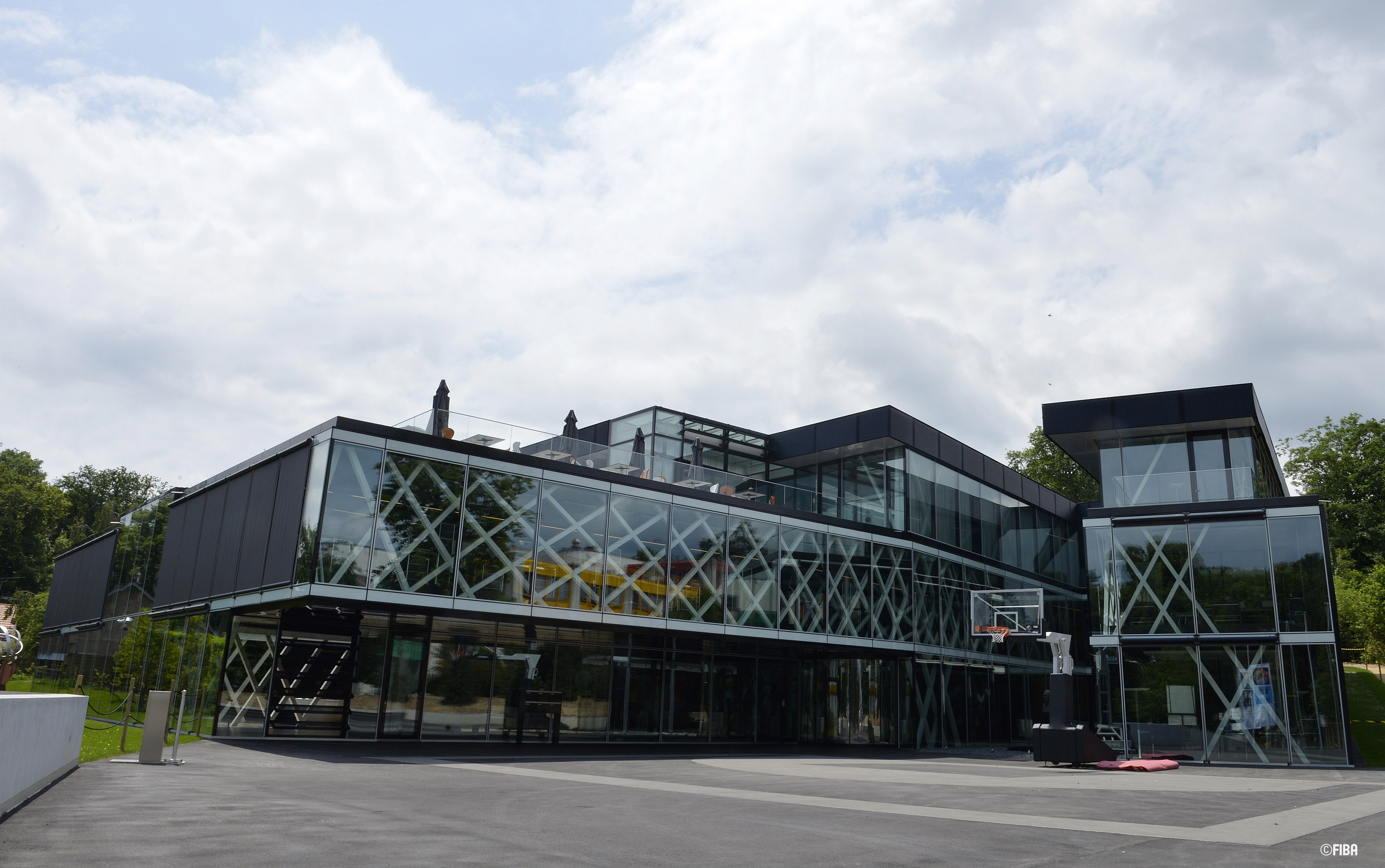
FIBA headquarters in Mies, Switzerland

FIBA's headquarters is located in Mies, Switzerland and is known as the Patrick Baumann House of Basketball, named after the organization's former Secretary-General.

FIBA's supreme body is the FIBA Congress, an assembly of representatives from each affiliated national federation, with each having one vote. The Congress assembles every two years, either an elective or mid-term congress, and is the only body that can make modifications to FIBA's General Statutes. An elective congress elects the FIBA President, Treasurer, and members of the FIBA Central Board, and appoints members of their Ethics and Nominations Panels. Two extraordinary congresses have been held since 1989, with the most recent held in 2014.

The FIBA Central Board is the organization's highest executive body. It comprises 29 people: the president; the secretary-general; the treasurer; 13 members elected by the FIBA Congress; the 5 presidents of each FIBA zone; up to six co-opted members; a representative each from the National Basketball Association and the players. The Board is the body that decides which countries will host the FIBA Basketball World Cup and the FIBA Women's Basketball World Cup. The Central Board for the term 2023-2027 comprises 27 members.

The president and the secretary general are the main office holders of FIBA and are in charge of its daily administration. Sheikh Saud Ali Al Thani was elected president on 23 August 2023 at the FIBA Congress. Andreas Zagklis was appointed secretary-general on 8 December 2018 following the death of Patrick Baumann.

== Competitions ==
=== Men ===
- FIBA Basketball World Cup
- Olympic Basketball Tournament
- FIBA Olympic Qualifying Tournament
- FIBA U-19 Basketball World Cup
- FIBA U-17 Basketball World Cup

==== (3x3 men) ====
- FIBA 3x3 World Cup
- Olympic 3x3 Basketball Tournament
- FIBA 3x3 U-23 World Cup
- FIBA 3x3 U-18 World Cup

=== Women ===
- FIBA Women's Basketball World Cup
- Olympic Women's Basketball Tournament
- FIBA Women's Olympic Qualifying Tournament
- FIBA U-19 Women's Basketball World Cup
- FIBA U-17 Women's Basketball World Cup

==== (3x3 women) ====
- FIBA 3x3 Women's World Cup
- Olympic 3x3 Women's Basketball Tournament
- FIBA 3x3 U-23 Women's World Cup
- FIBA 3x3 U-18 Women's World Cup

=== Clubs ===
- FIBA Intercontinental Cup

=== Esports ===
- EFIBA Esport

== Current title holders ==
=== World champions ===
Tournament	FIBA World Cup	Year	Next edition	Olympics	Year
Men	Germany (1)	2023	2027	United States (17)	2024
Women	United States (12)	2026	2030	United States (10)	2024
U-19 Men	United States (9)	2025	2027	Argentina (1)	2018
U-19 Women	United States (11)	2025	2027	United States (2)	2018
U-17 Men	United States (8)	2026	2028	N/A	
U-17 Women	United States (7)	2026	2028	N/A	

A: The Youth Olympic Games are a U-19 event played in FIBA 3x3 format.

=== 3x3 world champions ===
Tournament	FIBA 3x3 World Cup	Year	Olympics	Year
Men	Latvia (1)	2026	Netherlands (1)	2024
Women	United States (4)	2026	Germany (1)	2024
U-23 Men	Lithuania (2)	2026	N/A	
U-23 Women	United States (2)	2026	N/A	
U-18 Men	United States (3)	2024	N/A	
U-18 Women	United States (8)	2024	N/A	

=== World club champions ===
Club competition	Year	Champion	Score	Runner-up	Next edition
FIBA Intercontinental Cup	2026	(USA Basketball) NBA G League United (1)	89–86	(Lithuanian Basketball Federation) Rytas	2027

=== eFIBA Esport World Champions ===
Competitions	Year	Champion	Score	Runner-up	Next edition
eFIBA	2026	Philippines	1st	Turkey	2027

=== Continental champions ===
National teams	FIBA Africa	Year	Next edition	FIBA Americas	Year	Next edition	FIBA Asia	Year	Next edition	FIBA Europe	Year	Next edition	FIBA Oceania	Year	Next edition
Men	Angola (12)	2025	2029	Brazil (5)	2025	2029	Australia (3)	2025	2029	Germany (2)	2025	2029	Australia (19)	2015	N/A
Women	Nigeria (7)	2025	2027	United States (5)	2025	2027	Australia (1)	2025	2027	Belgium (2)	2025	2027	Australia (15)	2015	N/A
U-18 Men	Ivory Coast (1)	2026	2028	Canada (1)	2026	2028	Australia (2)	2026	2028	Slovenia (1)	2026	2027	New Zealand (2)	2025	2027
U-18 Women	Mali (10)	2026	2028	United States (13)	2026	2028	Australia (3)	2026	2028	Spain (7)	2026	2027	Australia (11)	2025	2027
U-16 Men	Ivory Coast (1)	2025	2027	United States (9)	2025	2027	Australia (4)	2025	2027	Latvia (1)	2026	2027	Australia (7)	2024	2026
U-16 Women	Egypt (1)	2025	2027	United States (8)	2025	2027	Australia (4)	2025	2027	Spain (12)	2026	2027	Australia (7)	2024	2026

B: FIBA Oceania no longer conducts senior-level championships for either sex. Since 2017, that region's members have competed for FIBA Asia senior championships. FIBA Oceania continues to hold age-grade championships.

=== Continental club champions ===
Region	Competition	Year	Champion	Title	Runner-up	Next edition
Men's club competitions
Africa	Basketball Africa League	2026	(Rwanda) RSSB Tigers	1st	(Angola) Petro de Luanda	2027
Americas	Basketball Champions League Americas	2025–26	(Argentina) Boca Juniors	1st	(Brazil) Sesi Franca	2026–27
Americas	Liga Sudamericana de Baloncesto	2025	(Argentina) Ferro Carril Oeste	1st	(Argentina) Regatas Corrientes	2026
Asia	Basketball Champions League Asia	2025	(Japan) Utsunomiya Brex	1st	(Lebanon) Al Riyadi	2026
Asia	East Asia Super League	2025–26	(Japan) Utsunomiya Brex	1st	(Chinese Taipei) Taoyuan Pauian Pilots	2026–27
Asia	West Asia Super League	2025–26	(Lebanon) Al Riyadi	3rd	(Lebanon) Sagesse	2026–27
Asia	Basketball Champions League Asia - East	2026	(Hong Kong) South China	1st	(Chinese Taipei) Taoyuan Pauian Pilots	2027
Europe	Basketball Champions League	2025–26	(Lithuania) Rytas	1st	(Greece) AEK Betsson	2026–27
Europe	Europe Cup	2025–26	(Spain) Surne Bilbao Basket	2nd	(Greece) PAOK mateco	2026–27
Europe	Euroleague Basketball Next Generation Tournament	2025–26	(Spain) FC Barcelona	2nd	(Spain) Real Madrid	2026–27
Europe	Youth Basketball Champions League	2026	(Lithuania) Rytas	3rd	(Bosnia and Herzegovina) Igokea	2027
Women's club competitions
Africa	Africa Women's Basketball League	2025	(Egypt) Al Ahly	1st	(Mozambique) Ferroviário de Maputo	2026
Americas	Women's Basketball League Americas	2026	(United States) Bay Area Phoenix	1st	(Chile) Sportiva Italiana	2027
Americas	Liga Sudamericana de Baloncesto Femenino	2024	(Brazil) SESI Araraquara	1st	(Uruguay) Aguada	2025
Asia	Women's Basketball League Asia	2026	(Japan) Denso Iris	1st	(China) Sichuan Yuanda Meile	2027
Europe	EuroLeague Women (1st-tier)	2025–26	(Turkish Basketball Federation) Fenerbahçe Opet	3rd	(Turkish Basketball Federation) Galatasaray Çağdaş Faktoring	2026–27
Europe	EuroCup Women (2nd-tier)	2025–26	(Turkey) ÇİMSA ÇBK Mersin	1st	(Greece) Athinaikos Qualco	2026–27
Europe	SuperCup Women	2026	(Turkish Basketball Federation) Fenerbahçe Opet	3rd	(Turkey) ÇİMSA ÇBK Mersin	2027

C: The top-tier European professional basketball club competitions are complex. The EuroLeague run by Euroleague Basketball and its EuroCup are competing with the FIBA Europe organized competitions. The best European clubs have joined the closed league EuroLeague.

== Awards ==
=== Most Valuable Player ===
Tournament	Most Recent Awardee	Team	Year
Men	Dennis Schröder	Germany	2023
Women	Breanna Stewart	United States	2026
U-19 Men	AJ Dybantsa	United States	2025
U-19 Women	Saniyah Hall	United States	2025
U-17 Men	Joaquim Boumtje-Boumtje	United States	2026
U-17 Women	Ivanna Wilson Manyacka	United States	2026

== World rankings ==
=== Men's ===
The following table has the Top 32 men's basketball countries in the world. The Top 32 is here due to the next iteration of the FIBA Basketball World Cup, the world's major tournament in men's basketball, anticipating to have 32 countries compete. As such, this table shows the projected teams in the next FIBA Men's WC based on the ranking's algorithm. This list does not consider berths given to countries based on hosting or region status.

Top 32 Rankings as of 1 September 2026
Rank	Change	Team	Points
1	Steady	United States	952.3
2	Steady	Germany	877.4
3	▲1	France	870.9
4	▼1	Serbia	870.6
5	Steady	Canada	863
6	Steady	Spain	822.1
7	Steady	Australia	822
8	Steady	Argentina	809.2
9	▲2	Turkey	808.1
10	Steady	Lithuania	801.3
11	▼2	Brazil	799
12	Steady	Latvia	787.9
13	Steady	Greece	784.4
14	Steady	Slovenia	756.3
15	Steady	Italy	745.4
16	▲1	Finland	706
17	▼1	Puerto Rico	698.8
18	Steady	Montenegro	671.2
19	Steady	Poland	651.2
20	Steady	Georgia	614.7
21	Steady	Dominican Republic	605.2
22	Steady	Japan	550.7
23	Steady	Czech Republic	531
24	Steady	South Sudan	530.4
25	Steady	New Zealand	515.2
26	▲2	Mexico	478.6
27	▲5	Angola	473.9
28	▼2	Iran	472
29	Steady	Israel	471.9
30	Steady	China	469.1
31	▲2	Bosnia and Herzegovina	465.7
32	▲2	Croatia	465.1
*Change from 9 August 2021

=== Women's ===
The following table has the Top 16 women's basketball countries in the world. The Top 16 is here due to the next iteration of the FIBA Women's Basketball World Cup, the world's major tournament in women's basketball, anticipating to have 16 countries compete. As such, this table shows the projected teams in the next FIBA Women's WC based on the ranking's algorithm. This list does not consider berths given to countries based on hosting or region status.

Top 20 Rankings as of 14 September 2026
Rank	Change	Team	Points
1	Steady	United States	1076.1
2	Steady	France	936.4
3	▲1	Spain	885.1
4	▲1	Germany	782.3
5	▼2	Australia	723.7
6	▼1	Belgium	714.2
8	▼3	China	711.7
8	Steady	Nigeria	585.2
9	▲1	Japan	572.9
10	▼1	Brazil	566.6
11	▼4	Canada	565.7
12	▲1	Puerto Rico	543.5
13	▲1	Italy	480.4
14	▲1	South Korea	475.1
15	▼3	Serbia	471.7
16	▲3	Hungary	418.8
*Change from 9 August 2021

== Sponsors of FIBA ==
As of December 2024

=== FIBA Global Partners ===
- 1xbet
- Ganten
- Molten
- Nike
- Smart Communications
- TCL Corporation
- Tencent
- Tissot
- Wanda Group
- Yili Group

=== Other Partners ===
- Global Supplier: Kuehne + Nagel
