= Youth Basketball Champions League =

European basketball league

- Organising body: FIBA Europe
- Founded: 2023
- First season: 2023
- Country: FIBA Europe members
- Number of teams: 12
- Current champions: (Lithuania) Rytas (3rd title) (2026)
- Most championships: (Lithuania) Rytas (3 titles)
- Website: championsleague.basketball/en/youth
- 2026 Youth Basketball Champions League

The Youth Basketball Champions League (YBCL) is a European basketball competition for men's junior teams organised by FIBA Europe. The league is contested by junior teams of selected Basketball Champions League member teams which can field players younger than 18 years old. The establishment of the league was announced in January and the inaugural season began in April 2023.

The inaugural 2023 season took place with ten teams in Bursa, Turkey, and was won by Igokea. The second edition expanded to 13 teams and was held in Debrecen, Hungary. The second championship was won by Rytas. The third edition of the Youth Basketball Champions League was played at the Tarik Almis Sports Hall in Manisa. It was won by Rytas. Fourt season was held in Aleksandrovac, where Rytas secured its third consecutive title.

== Winners ==
Season	Year	Host city	Final			Third and fourth place		
Season	Year	Host city	Winners	Score	Second place	Third place	Score	Fourth place
1	2023; Details	Bursa	(Bosnia and Herzegovina) Igokea	73–66	(Turkey) Tofaş	(Lithuania) Rytas	78–73	(Israel) Hapoel Jerusalem
2	2024; Details	Debrecen	(Lithuania) Rytas	98–62	(Turkey) Galatasaray	(Turkey) Tofaş	93–89	(Bosnia and Herzegovina) Igokea
3	2025; Details	Manisa	(Lithuania) Rytas	109–76	(Belgium) Filou Oostende	(Turkey) Tofaş	83–72	(Germany) Porsche BBA Ludwigsburg
4	2026; Details	Aleksandrovac	(Lithuania) Rytas	77–54	(Bosnia and Herzegovina) Igokea	(Belgium) Filou Oostende	83–72	(Germany) Telekom Baskets Bonn

== All-time participants ==
The following is a list of clubs who have played in the Youth Basketball Champions League at any time since its formation in 2023 to the current season.

1st	Champions
2nd	Runners-up
3rd	Third place
4th	Fourth place
SF	Semifinalists
QF	Quarterfinalists
RS	Regular season
Q	Qualified for upcoming season

Team	2023	2024	2025	2026	Total seasons
(Belgium) Oostende	7th	—N/a	2nd place, silver medalist(s)	3rd place, bronze medalist(s)	3
(Israel) Bnei Herzliya	9th	—N/a	—N/a	—N/a	1
(Czech Republic) Nymburk	10th	7th	10th	12th	4
(Czech Republic) Opava	—N/a	8th	—N/a	—N/a	1
(Spain) UCAM Murcia	8th	—N/a	—N/a	—N/a	1
(Spain) Lenovo Tenerife	6th	5th	—N/a	—N/a	2
(Germany) Riesen Ludwigsburg	5th	11th	4th	10th	4
(Israel) Hapoel Jerusalem	4th	12th	—N/a	—N/a	2
(Lithuania) Rytas	3rd place, bronze medalist(s)	1st place, gold medalist(s)	1st place, gold medalist(s)	1st place, gold medalist(s)	4
(Turkey) Galatasaray	—N/a	2nd place, silver medalist(s)	9th	9th	3
(Turkey) Tofaş	2nd place, silver medalist(s)	3rd place, bronze medalist(s)	3rd place, bronze medalist(s)	8th	4
(Bosnia and Herzegovina) Igokea	1st place, gold medalist(s)	4th	11th	2nd place, silver medalist(s)	4
(Germany) Oldenburg	—N/a	6th	—N/a	6th	2
(Greece) AEK	—N/a	10th	—N/a	—N/a	1
(Greece) Promitheas Patras	—N/a	13th	—N/a	—N/a	1
(Hungary) Debrecen	—N/a	9th	—N/a	—N/a	1
(Italy) Pallacanestro Reggiana	—N/a	—N/a	5th	—N/a	1
(Germany) Telekom Baskets Bonn	—N/a	—N/a	6th	4th	2
(Turkey) Aliaga Petkimspor	—N/a	—N/a	7th	—N/a	1
(Serbia) Spartak Office Shoes	—N/a	—N/a	8th	11th	2
(Turkey) Manisa BBSK	—N/a	—N/a	12th	—N/a	1
(Azerbaijan) Sabah	—N/a	—N/a	—N/a	7th	1
(Bosnia and Herzegovina) Borac WWIN	—N/a	—N/a	—N/a	5th	1

== All-Star Team and MVP ==
At the end of each season, FIBA Europe selects one most valuable player and names five players to the All-Star Team.

Season	MVP	All-Star Team	Ref.
2023	Dusan Makitan (Igokea)	Ognjen Radosic (Igokea); Ozgur Cengiz (Tofas); Roe Averni (Hapoel Jerusalem); Ernestas Matulevic (Rytas)	
2024	Ignas Urbonas (Rytas)	Kerem Erdem (Igokea); Efe Postel (Tofas); Babel Yitu Lipasi (Lenovo Tenerife); Andrej Acimovic (Igokea)	
2025	Ignas Urbonas (Rytas)	Ignas Urbonas (Rytas); Gabrielius Bubnys (Rytas); Daan Pieters (Filou Oostende); Tim Waerniers (Filou Oostende); Mame Samba Deme El Hadji (Pallacanestro Reggiana)	
2026	Gabrielius Buivydas (Rytas)	Gabrielius Buivydas (Rytas); Djordje Djukanovic (Igokea); Tim Waerniers (Filou Oostende); Von Saldern (Bonn); Emmanuel Agbason (Sabah)	
