= Léon Bouffard =

Swiss athlete and sports administrator (1893–1981)

Léon Bouffard (24 June 1893 in Geneva, Switzerland – 23 July 1981 in Geneva, Switzerland) was a Swiss athlete and sports administrator. As an athlete, he competed in pole vault, winning the Swiss championship in 1914. He was the founder (in 1929) and president of the Swiss Basketball Federation. He co-founded FIBA in 1932 and served as FIBA's president from 1932 to 1948. He organized 1st European Basketball Championship in 1935 and 4th European Basketball Championship in 1946, both in Geneva. Since 1948 he served as the Honorary President of FIBA. In 2007, he was enshrined as a contributor into the FIBA Hall of Fame.
