= Patrick Baumann (basketball) =

Swiss basketball executive (1967–2018)

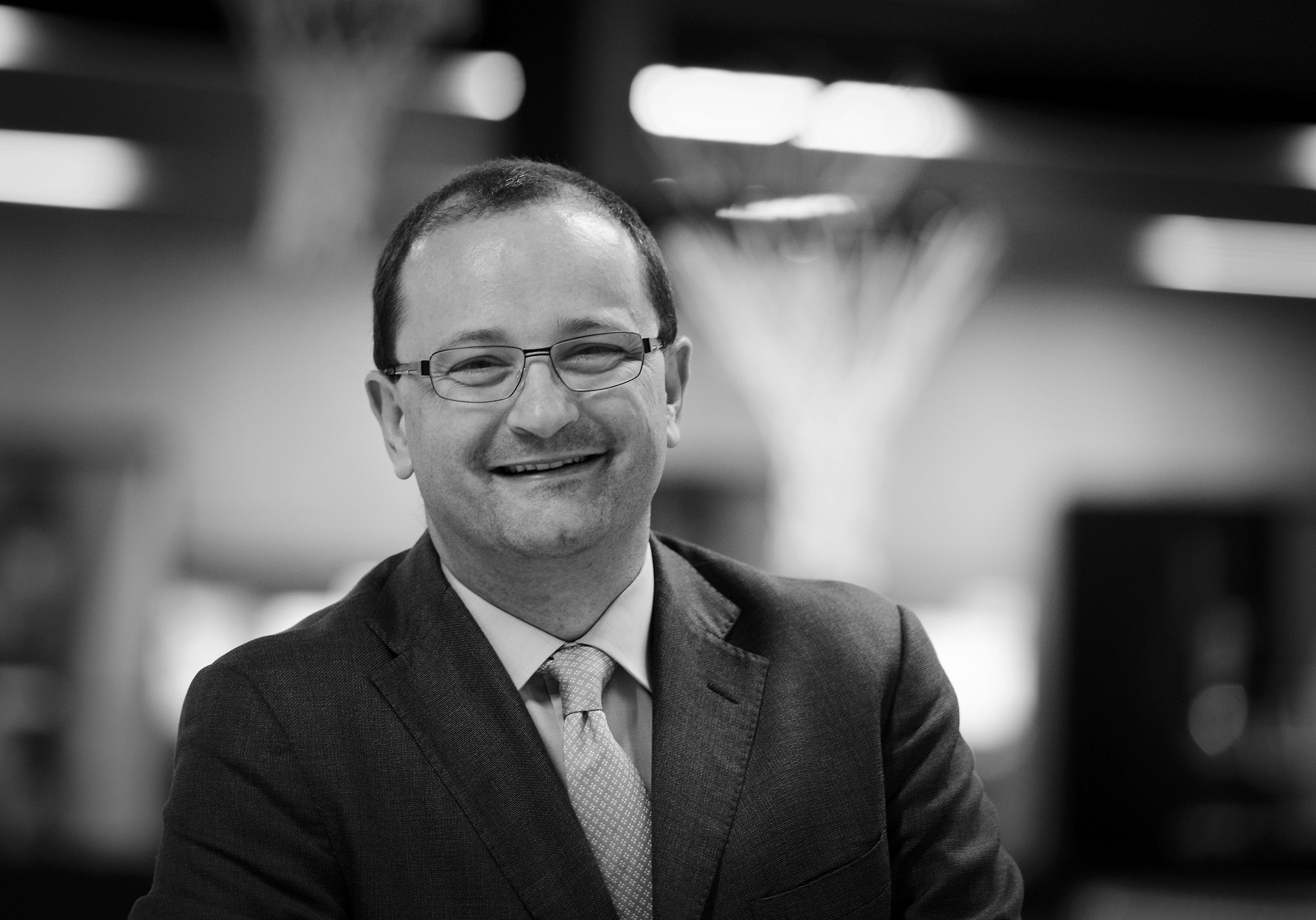

3rd Secretary General of FIBA
- In office 1 January 2003 – 13 October 2018
- Preceded by: Borislav Stanković
- Succeeded by: Andreas Zagklis

Personal details
- Born: 5 August 1967 Basel, Switzerland
- Died: 13 October 2018 (aged 51) Buenos Aires, Argentina
- Cause of death: Heart attack
- Occupation: Basketball executive, player, coach and referee

Patrick Baumann (5 August 1967 – 13 October 2018) was a Swiss basketball executive, player and coach. He was the president of the Global Association of International Sports Federations and secretary general of the International Basketball Federation (FIBA). He was posthumously inducted into the Basketball Hall of Fame in 2020.

== Background ==
Baumann was born in Basel on 5 August 1967. He was involved in many aspects of the basketball world. He played basketball while in Italy and also served as a referee. In Switzerland, he trained referees, coached a basketball team, ran clinics and organized tournaments.

== FIBA ==
Baumann joined FIBA in 1994 and became the Deputy Secretary General in 1995. He was elevated to the position of Secretary General in 2002, with his term officially starting in 2003.

While Secretary General of FIBA, Baumann supported the growth of 3x3 basketball. This format was used at the Nanjing 2014 Youth Olympic Games and was used in the under 18 will championships in 2015 Israel.

== Education ==
- 1987 – Maturità Classica, Sanremo, Italy
- 1990 – Law Degree University of Lausanne Switzerland
- 1996 – Master in Sport Administration Management University of Lyon, France
- 2001 – MBS University of Chicago, Chicago

== Death ==
Baumann died of a heart attack while attending the 2018 Youth Olympics in Buenos Aires, Argentina, on 13 October 2018.

Sporting positions
Preceded by Borislav Stanković	Secretary General of the FIBA; 2003–2018	Succeeded by Andreas Zagklis
