= Horacio Muratore =

Argentine basketball executive (1951–2026)

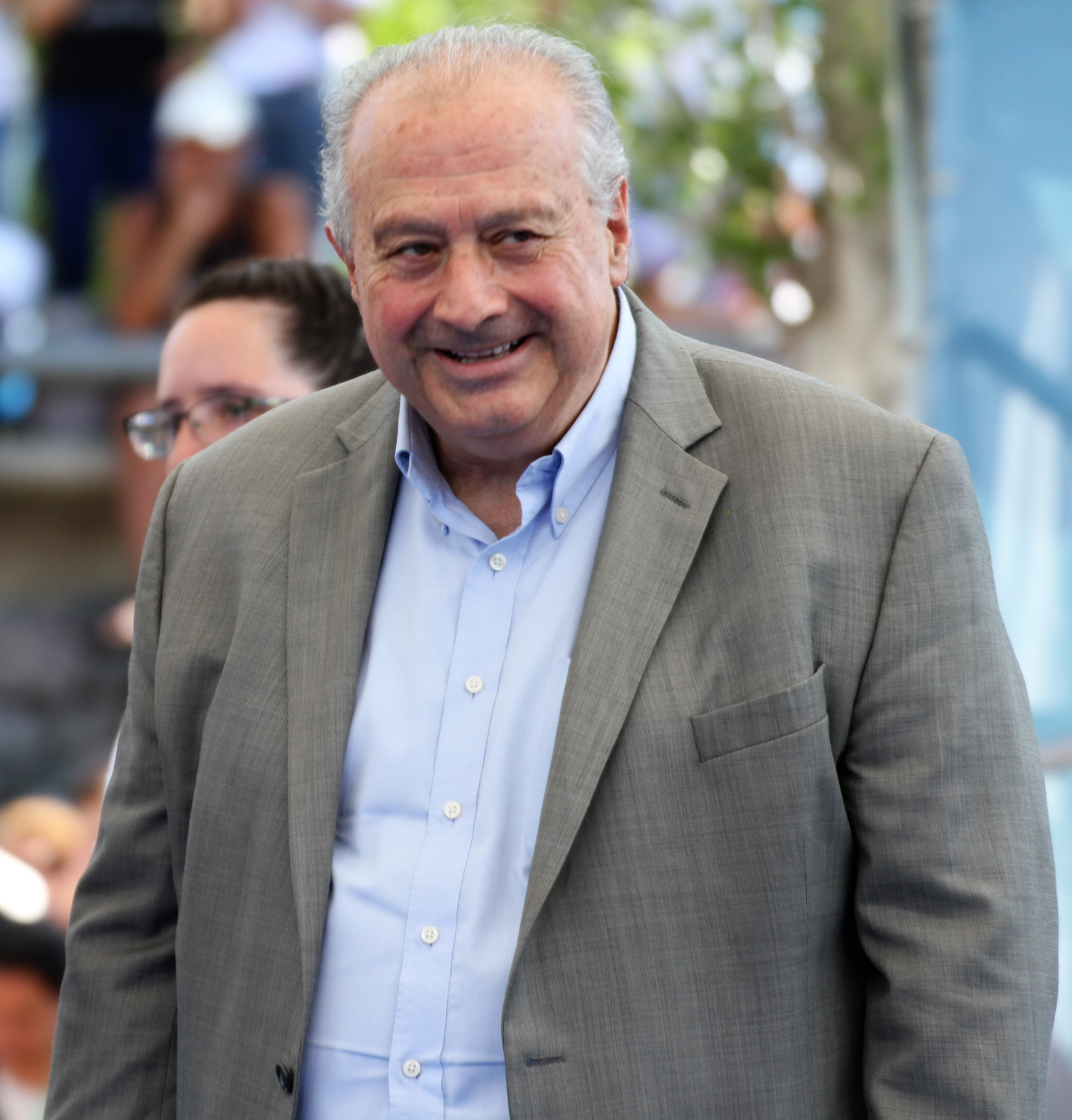
- Muratore in 2018
- Born: 29 November 1951; San Miguel de Tucumán, Tucumán Province, Argentina
- Died: 24 or 25 July 2026 (age 74)
- Education: National University of Tucumán
- Occupation: Basketball executive

Horacio Muratore (29 November 1951 – 24 or 25 July 2026) was an Argentine basketball executive. The president of the International Basketball Federation (FIBA) from 2014 to 2019, Muratore started his career in basketball at the Tucumán BB club, where his father worked. Though he briefly left the club, he returned and in 1983 was made their president. He worked as the club's president until 1992, when he was elected president of the Argentine Basketball Confederation. His tenure as president coincided with what was termed the beginning of the Golden generation of Argentine basketball; he left the confederation in 2008 and, in 2009, was made president of FIBA Americas. The next year, he became vice president of FIBA and, in 2014, was elected president of the organization: the first and only Argentine to hold the role.

After leaving the FIBA presidency, Muratore continued to work in basketball: he was the president of the FIBA Foundation from 2019 to 2023 and he founded the Basketball Champions League Americas. In addition to his work with basketball, Muratore was an accountant and taught classes in the subject and worked for the National University of Tucumán.

== Early life and career ==
Horacio Muratore was born on 29 November 1951, in San Miguel de Tucumán, Tucumán Province, Argentina. His grandparents moved to Argentina from Italy and his father was an executive and founding member of the Tucumán basketball club, Tucumán BB. Muratore was married and had four children, the first around 1976. He was a certified accountant.

He attended the National University of Tucumán, where he studied accounting. He played basketball at Tucumán BB, and by 1971, when his father was the club's president, had started to work in the club's management, though he briefly left after his wife told him he needed to choose between it and family. In 1983, he was made the club's president. During this time, he taught accounting at university, worked as the secretary for the Faculty of Economic Sciences at the National University of Tucumán, and worked as an accountant. He continued to work as the club president of Tucumán BB until 1992, when he was elected as the president of the Argentine Basketball Confederation. He did not earn money while working at the confederation, instead selling insurance to support himself.

His presidency of the Argentina Basketball Confederation coincided with the start of the Golden generation of Argentine basketball. The Argentine teams won silver at the 2002 FIBA World Championship, gold at the 2004 Summer Olympics, and bronze at the 2008 Summer Olympics. They also won the 2008 FIBA Diamond Ball and Argentina itself hosted the 1995 Pan American Games.

Muratore remained president of the Argentina Basketball Confederation until 2008; in 2009, he was made the president of FIBA Americas, a role which he remained in until 2014. In 2010, he was unanimously elected vice-president of FIBA. He rose to president of the organization in 2014 when he was, again unanimously, elected to the position; Muratore was the first Argentine in the role. He served in the role until 2019, when he was succeeded by Hamane Niang; FIBA declared Muratore an honorary president from his retirement.

After leaving the FIBA presidency, Muratore worked from 2019 to 2023 as the president of the FIBA Foundation. At the foundation, he worked on their "Basketball For Good" program. In 2019, he also founded the Basketball Champions League Americas. In 2023, a book about his life by the journalist Fabián García was published by FIBA under the title Una vida por el básquetbol (transl. A life for basketball).

== Death ==
Muratore died on 24 or 25 July 2026, at the age of 74. FIBA, Argentine Basketball Confederation, and various sporting organizations in Tucumán, including Tucumán BB, posted tributes.
