= 1970 ABC Junior Championship for Women =

1970 FIBA U18 Women's Asia Cup
1st FIBA Under-18 Women's Asian Basketball Championship

Tournament details
- Host country: South Korea
- Dates: August 25–September 2
- Teams: 3 (from all Asian federations)
- Venue: 1 (in 1 host city)

Final positions
- Champions: South Korea (1st title)

The 1970 ABC Junior Championship for Women was the women's division of the inaugural edition of the Asian Basketball Confederation (ABC)'s junior championship or the Asian Youth Basketball Championship. The games were held at the Jangchung Arena in Seoul, South Korea from August 25–September 2, 1970. The age restriction was under 19.

Only three nations participated; nevertheless, the hosts South Korea won the inaugural championship by sweeping all of their assignments, defeating Japan and Taiwan twice. Japan and Taiwan were tied with win–loss record of 1–3, but Japan took second place by head-to-head records.

== Results ==
| Team | Pld | W | L | Pts |
|---|---|---|---|---|
| South Korea | 4 | 4 | 0 | 8 |
| Japan | 4 | 1 | 3 | 5 |
| Taiwan | 4 | 1 | 3 | 5 |

August 25

Report

| South Korea | 85–42 | Taiwan |
Scoring by half: 47−23, 38−19

Seoul

August 27

Report

| Japan | 61–51 | Taiwan |
Scoring by half: 24-26, 37-25

Seoul

August 29

Report

| South Korea | 85–70 | Japan |
Scoring by half: 51-31, 34-39

Seoul

August 30

Report

| South Korea | 82–52 | Taiwan |
Scoring by half: 42-28, 40-24

Seoul

September 1

Report

| Japan | 72–77 (OT) | Taiwan |
Scoring by half: 37-30, 30-37 Overtime: 5-10

Seoul

September 2

Report

| South Korea | 85–72 | Japan |
Scoring by half: 44-38, 41-34

Seoul

== Final standing ==
| Rank | Team | Record |
|---|---|---|
| 1st place, gold medalist(s) | South Korea | 4–0 |
| 2nd place, silver medalist(s) | Japan | 1–3 |
| 3rd place, bronze medalist(s) | Taiwan | 1–3 |

== Awards ==
1970 Asian Under-18 champions

South Korea
First title

== See also ==
- 1970 ABC Junior Championship
