= Andreas Zagklis =

Greek lawyer and basketball executive (born 1980)

- Ανδρέας Ζαγκλής
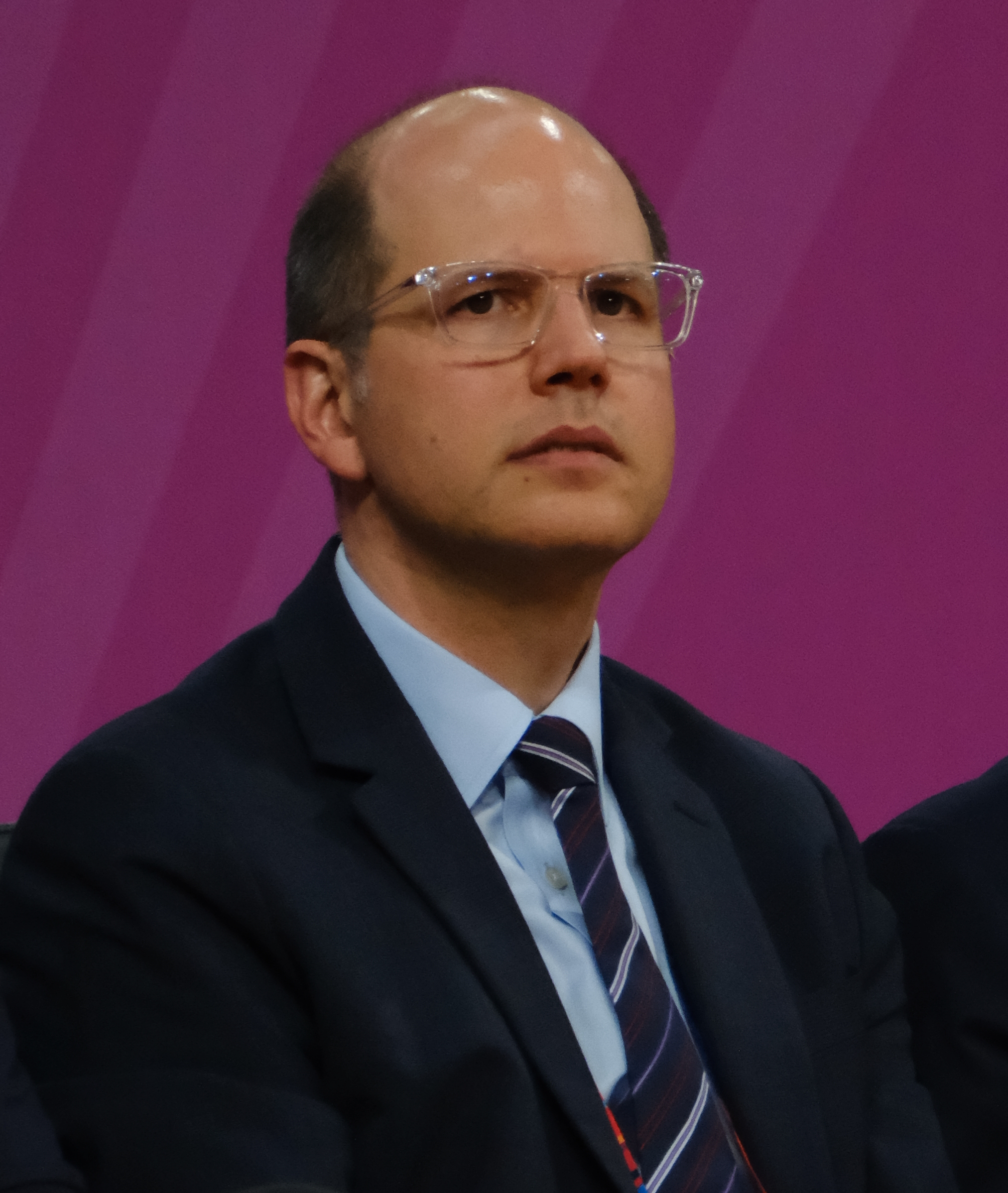

4th Secretary General of FIBA
- Incumbent
- Assumed office 8 December 2018
- Preceded by: Patrick Baumann

Personal details
- Born: 8 December 1980 (age 45) Greece
- Children: 2
- Education: University of Athens
- Occupation: Lawyer; basketball executive; lecturer

Andreas Zagklis (Greek: Ανδρέας Ζαγκλής; born 8 December 1980) is a Greek lawyer and basketball executive, who is the current secretary general of the International Basketball Federation (FIBA).

== Early life and education ==
Zagklis received his undergraduate and post-graduate degrees from the Law School of the University of Athens while he spent two semesters as a visiting student at the University of Salamanca and the University of Western Ontario respectively. He also completed the postgraduate programme on Olympic Studies at the International Olympic Academy. Most recently, Zagklis attended the Leadership in Corporate Counsel programme at the Harvard Law School.

Zagklis is a research fellow at the Hellenic Center of Research on sports law and is recognized as a sports law expert for Greece, appointed by the Asser International Sports Law Center, based in The Hague, in various projects commissioned by the European Union.

Zagklis was a basketball player, coach, and administrative agent, played for the Melissia basketball team (1990–1995), before going to Maroussi's. At the same time, however, he began his coaching and, in 2001, he was chosen to represent the University of Athens at the European Universities Basketball Championships, in Aveiro, Portugal as a member of the basketball team, but was injured and had his third surgery. He is the founder of Hermes Melissia and the creator of the club's Academy.

== Professional career ==
Zagklis practiced next to the pioneer sports lawyers Pantelis Dedes in Greece from 2004 to 2008, and next to Dirk-Rainer Martens in Munich, Germany from 2008 to 2016. In 2006, along with Dedes, Zagklis published the book "Lozano's Athletic Arbitration Court". At the time with Dede, he represented some of the top players such as Michalis Kakiouzis, Giorgos Sigalas, and Arvydas Macijauskas.

Since 2008, Zagklis is in charge of the Basketball Arbitral Tribunal (BAT), he is an FIVB legal counsel, advising on a wide range of commercial and sporting legal issues, and has represented various clubs and players before FIFA, UEFA and acted as an assistant to the Court of Arbitration for Sport in three Olympic Games (2004, 2006, and 2008). Zagklis has worked in the past with Xabi Alonso, Javi Martínez and Arturo Vidal in the cases of their transfer to FC Bayern Munich, while he has also worked with football clubs such as Fenerbahçe, Panathinaikos, PAOK and AEK Athens. He also serves as a member of the Disciplinary Commission of the International Gymnastics Federation (FIG) and the International Cycling Union’s (UCI) Anti-Doping Tribunal.

Zagklis has published several articles on sports law, policy, labor relations, and arbitration. He is a guest lecturer at the International Master in Management, Law and Humanities of Sport at the University of Neuchâtel, and at the International Sports Law LLM programme of the University of Zurich.

=== FIBA ===
In June 2016, Zagklis joined FIBA as a legal director. Following the death of Secretary General Patrick Baumann during the Summer Youth Olympics in October 2018, on 7 December 2018, the FIBA's Central Board unanimously agreed to appoint Zagklis as new FIBA Secretary General.

== Personal life ==
Zagklis is married and has two children. He speaks five languages: English, Spanish, German, French, and Greek.
