= Renato William Jones =

Former FIBA Secretary-General

Personal information
- Born: 5 October 1906 Rome, Kingdom of Italy
- Died: 22 April 1981 (aged 74) Munich, West Germany

Career information
- College: Springfield (1924–1928)

Career highlights
- Olympic Order (1980); FIBA Order of Merit (1994)
- Basketball Hall of Fame
- FIBA Hall of Fame

Renato William Jones (5 October 1906 – 22 April 1981), also known as R. William, or simply William Jones, was a British basketball executive and popularizer of basketball in Europe and in Asia. He held an honorary doctorate from Springfield College.

== Career ==
Jones was one of the founding fathers of the Fédération Internationale de Basketball Amateur (FIBA) in 1932 and served as the first Secretary-General from 1932 until 1976. From 1932 he was eager to convince the IOC that an Olympic tournament should be organized in the 1936 Berlin Olympic Games. After the International Handball Federation (IAHF) renounced on its responsibility for basketball in 1934, FIBA was accepted as autonomous body by IOC and the Berlin tourney could be held under Jones' supervision. Later, he was made secretary general of the International Council of Sport and Physical Education in 1958.

He was elected to the Naismith Memorial Basketball Hall of Fame in 1964 and the FIBA Hall of Fame in 2007. He was also made a patron of the Amateur Basketball Association of England in 1973.

During the 1972 Olympic Men's Basketball Final, Jones ordered the time clock technician to put three seconds back on the game clock, when the United States appeared to have defeated the Soviet Union 50–49 for an unprecedented eighth straight gold medal. The ruling allowed the Soviet team to score a final basket and win 51-50. He was quoted later as saying "The Americans have to learn how to lose, even when they think they are right." Jones later conceded that he had no authority to make a ruling during a game. However, his power over international basketball was such that the technician complied.

== Honorary tournaments ==
The World Cup for Champion Clubs, FIBA Intercontinental Cup William Jones, and the annual international basketball tournament, the William Jones Cup, held in Taipei, Taiwan, were named after him, in honour to his contribution to the world of basketball.

== In popular culture ==
- In the 2015 Serbian sports drama We Will Be the World Champions, Jones is portrayed by John Savage.
