= Hamane Niang =

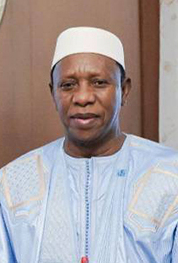

14th President of FIBA
- In office 29 August 2019 – 23 August 2023
- Preceded by: Horacio Muratore
- Succeeded by: Sheikh Saud Ali Al Thani

Personal details
- Born: 6 June 1952 (age 74) Kayes, French Sudan
- Occupation: Politician; basketball executive

Hamane Niang (born 6 June 1952) is a Malian politician and basketball executive, who served as the president of the International Basketball Federation (FIBA) from 2019 to 2023.

== Career ==
After his primary education in Kayes and secondary education in Bamako, Niang continued his studies in Dakar, Senegal, where he obtained a Masters in Economic Science and to Caen (France) where he obtained a diplôme d'études supérieures spécialisées (DESS), in finance.

On his return to Mali, he was assistant director of credit at the Banque du Développement du Mali between 1981 and 1989 before being named assistant to the cabinet at the Ministry of Finance and Commerce and entering Mobil Oil Mali as head of compatibility services, as well as administrative director and financier.

In 1994, he was named director of commercial services and joint director general of Elf Oil Mali/Total Mali. In 2005, he became director-general of Malienne de l'automobile.

On 3 October 2007, Niang was named Minister of Youth and Sports in the government of Modibo Sidibé. He stayed in this post in the reshuffle of 9.

=== Basketball executive career ===
Since 1999, Niang has been president of the Malian Basketball Federation.

In 2019, Hamane Niang was elected as the President of the FIBA, and served until 2023.
