= Basketball at the 1980 Summer Olympics – Men's team rosters =

Olympic basketball rosters

Twelve men's teams competed in basketball at the 1980 Summer Olympics.

== Australia ==
The following players represented Australia:

- Danny Morseu
- Gordie McLeod
- Ian Davies
- Larry Sengstock
- Les Riddle
- Mel Dalgleish
- Michael Tucker
- Perry Crosswhite
- Peter Ali
- Phil Smyth
- Steve Breheny
- Peter Walsh

== Brazil ==
The following players represented Brazil:

- André
- Marcel
- Marcelo
- Carioquinha
- Oscar Schmidt
- Adilson
- Gilson
- José Carlos Saiani
- Marquinhos
- Cadum
- Wagner da Silva

== Cuba ==
The following players represented Cuba:

- Alejandro Ortiz
- Alejandro Urgellés
- Daniel Scott
- Generoso Márquez
- Jorge Moré Rojas
- Miguel Calderón
- Noangel Luaces
- Pedro Abreu
- Raúl Dubois
- Ruperto Herrera
- Tomás Herrera
- Félix Morales

== Czechoslovakia ==
The following players represented Czechoslovakia:

- Dušan Žáček
- Gustáv Hraška
- Jaroslav Skála
- Jiří Pospíšil
- Kamil Brabenec
- Pavol Bojanovský
- Peter Rajniak
- Stano Kropilák
- Vlastibor Klimeš
- Vlastimil Havlík
- Zdeněk Douša
- Zdeněk Kos

== India ==
The following players represented India:

- Baldev Singh
- Ajmer Singh
- Parvez Diniar
- Dilip Gurumurthy
- Harbhajan Singh
- Jorawar Singh
- Amarnath Nagarajan
- Pramdiph Singh
- Paramjit Singh
- Radhey Shyam
- Hanuman Singh
- Tarlok Singh Sandhu

== Italy ==
The following players represented Italy:

- Romeo Sacchetti
- Roberto Brunamonti
- Mike Sylvester
- Enrico Gilardi
- Fabrizio Della Fiori
- Marco Solfrini
- Marco Bonamico
- Dino Meneghin
- Renato Villalta
- Renzo Vecchiato
- Pierluigi Marzorati
- Pietro Generali

== Poland ==
The following players represented Poland:

- Jerzy Bińkowski
- Leszek Doliński
- Krzysztof Fikiel
- Eugeniusz Kijewski
- Marcin Michalski
- Mieczysław Młynarski
- Ireneusz Mulak
- Zdzisław Myrda
- Ryszard Prostak
- Wojciech Rosiński
- Justyn Węglorz
- Dariusz Zelig

== Senegal ==
The following players represented Senegal:

- Bassirou Badji
- Yaya Cissokho
- Omar Dia
- Mamadou Diop
- Moustafa Diop
- Mathieu Faye
- Moussa M'Bengue
- Adramé Ndiaye
- Mandiaye Ndiaye
- Modou Sady Diagne
- Yamar Samb
- Modou Tall

== Soviet Union ==
The following players represented the Soviet Union:

- Stanislav Yeryomin
- Valery Miloserdov
- Sergei Tarakanov
- Oleksandr Salnykov
- Andrey Lopatov
- Nikolay Deryugin
- Sergei Belov
- Volodymyr Tkachenko
- Anatoly Myshkin
- Sergejus Jovaiša
- Alexander Belostenny
- Vladimir Zhigily

== Spain ==
The following players represented Spain:

- Cándido Sibilio
- Fernando Romay
- Ignacio Solozábal
- José Luis Llorente
- Juan Manuel López
- José María Margall
- Juan Antonio Corbalán
- Juan de la Cruz
- Juan Antonio San Epifanio
- Luis Santillana
- Manuel Flores
- Wayne Brabender

== Sweden ==
The following players represented Sweden:

- Peter Andersson
- Jan Enjebo
- Sten Feldreich
- Peter Gunterberg
- Joon-Olof Karlsson
- Bernt Malion
- Thomas Nordgren
- Roland Rahm
- Åke Skyttevall
- Torbjörn Taxén
- Göran Unger
- Leif Yttergren

== Yugoslavia ==
The following players represented Yugoslavia:

Yugoslavia men's national basketball team roster
Players
Coaches

Pos.	No.	Name	Age – Date of birth	Height	Club
C	4	Andro Knego	23 – 21 October 1956	2.06 m (6 ft 9 in)	Cibona	(Socialist Federal Republic of Yugoslavia)
SG	5	Dragan Kićanović	26 – 17 August 1953	1.91 m (6 ft 3 in)	Partizan	(Socialist Federal Republic of Yugoslavia)
C	6	Rajko Žižić	25 – 22 January 1955	2.10 m (6 ft 11 in)	OKK Beograd	(Socialist Federal Republic of Yugoslavia)
SF	7	Mihovil Nakić	24 – 31 July 1955	2.04 m (6 ft 8 in)	Cibona	(Socialist Federal Republic of Yugoslavia)
C	8	Željko Jerkov	26 – 6 November 1953	2.08 m (6 ft 10 in)	Jugoplastika	(Socialist Federal Republic of Yugoslavia)
SG	9	Branko Skroče	25 – 17 May 1955	1.95 m (6 ft 5 in)	Zadar	(Socialist Federal Republic of Yugoslavia)
PG	10	Zoran Slavnić	30 – 26 October 1949	1.80 m (5 ft 11 in)	Šibenka	(Socialist Federal Republic of Yugoslavia)
C	11	Krešimir Ćosić	31 – 26 November 1948	2.11 m (6 ft 11 in)	Sinudyne Bologna	(Italy)
C	12	Ratko Radovanović	23 – 16 October 1956	2.08 m (6 ft 10 in)	Bosna	(Socialist Federal Republic of Yugoslavia)
PF	13	Duje Krstulović	27 – 5 February 1953	2.03 m (6 ft 8 in)	Jugoplastika	(Socialist Federal Republic of Yugoslavia)
F	14	Dražen Dalipagić	28 – 27 November 1951	1.97 m (6 ft 6 in)	Partizan	(Socialist Federal Republic of Yugoslavia)
SG	15	Mirza Delibašić	26 – 9 January 1954	1.97 m (6 ft 6 in)	Bosna	(Socialist Federal Republic of Yugoslavia)

Head coach

- (Socialist Federal Republic of Yugoslavia) Ranko Žeravica

Assistant coach(es)

- (Socialist Federal Republic of Yugoslavia) Bogdan Tanjević
- (Socialist Federal Republic of Yugoslavia) Mirko Novosel
- (Socialist Federal Republic of Yugoslavia) Bratislav Đorđević

Legend

- Club – describes last
  club before the tournament
- Age – describes age
  on 20 July 1980
