= EuroBasket 1983 squads =

The following is the list of squads for each of the 12 teams competing in the EuroBasket 1983, held in France between 26 May and 4 June 1983. Each team selected a squad of 12 players for the tournament.

== Group A ==
=== France ===
France men's national basketball team roster
Players
Coaches

| Pos. | No. | Name | Age – Date of birth | Height | Club |
|---|---|---|---|---|---|---|
| PG | 4 | Alain Larrouquis | 32 – 15 June 1950 | 1.86 m (6 ft 1 in) | ASVEL Basket | (France) |
| PG | 5 | Jean-Michel Sénégal | 29 – 5 June 1953 | 1.84 m (6 ft 0 in) | Limoges CSP | (France) |
| F | 6 | Richard Dacoury | 23 – 6 July 1959 | 1.95 m (6 ft 5 in) | Limoges CSP | (France) |
| G | 7 | Jacques Monclar | 26 – 2 April 1957 | 1.93 m (6 ft 4 in) | Limoges CSP | (France) |
| C | 8 | Philippe Szanyiel | 22 – 23 October 1960 | 2.04 m (6 ft 8 in) | ASVEL Basket | (France) |
| C | 9 | Georges Brostherhous | 32 – 15 May 1951 | 2.05 m (6 ft 9 in) | Limoges CSP | (France) |
| C | 10 | Apollo Faye | 31 – 11 December 1951 | 2.08 m (6 ft 10 in) | Limoges CSP | (France) |
| F | 11 | Hervé Dubuisson | 25 – 8 August 1957 | 1.97 m (6 ft 6 in) | Stade Français | (France) |
| C | 12 | Daniel Haquet | 26 – 9 January 1957 | 2.02 m (6 ft 8 in) | Olympique Antibes | (France) |
| PF | 13 | Jacques Cachemire | 36 – 27 February 1947 | 1.97 m (6 ft 6 in) | ASPO Tours Basket | (France) |
| F | 14 | Éric Beugnot | 28 – 22 March 1955 | 2.00 m (6 ft 7 in) | Le Mans Sarthe Basket | (France) |
| C | 15 | Georges Vestris | 23 – 8 June 1959 | 2.14 m (7 ft 0 in) | ASPO Tours Basket | (France) |

Head coach

- Pierre Dao

Legend

- Club – describes last
  club before the tournament
- Age – describes age
  on 26 May 1983

=== Greece ===
Greece men's national basketball team roster
Players
Coaches

| Pos. | No. | Name | Age – Date of birth | Height | Club |
|---|---|---|---|---|---|---|
| F | 4 | Giannis Paragios | – |
| F | 5 | Albert Mallach | – |
| PG | 6 | Panagiotis Giannakis | 24 – 1 January 1959 | 1.92 m (6 ft 4 in) | Ionikos Nikaias | (Greece) |
| G | 7 | Nikos Galis | 25 – 23 July 1957 | 1.83 m (6 ft 0 in) | Aris | (Greece) |
| C | 8 | Manthos Katsoulis | 26 – 20 July 1956 | 2.05 m (6 ft 9 in) | McGill University | (United States) |
| PG | 9 | Minas Gekos | 23 – 7 November 1959 | 1.87 m (6 ft 2 in) | A.E.K. Athens | (Greece) |
| F | 10 | Michalis Romanidis | 17 – 19 June 1965 | 1.99 m (6 ft 6 in) | Aris | (Greece) |
| F | 11 | Nikos Stavropoulos | 23 – 17 June 1959 | 1.96 m (6 ft 5 in) | GE Larissa | (Greece) |
| PF | 12 | Liveris Andritsos | 23 – 31 December 1959 | 2.02 m (6 ft 8 in) | Panathinaikos | (Greece) |
| C | 13 | Panagiotis Fasoulas | 20 – 12 May 1963 | 2.13 m (7 ft 0 in) | P.A.O.K. | (Greece) |
| PG | 14 | Vangelis Alexandris | 32 – 2 February 1951 | 1.85 m (6 ft 1 in) | P.A.O.K. | (Greece) |
| C | 15 | Dimitris Kokolakis | 33 – 11 November 1949 | 2.15 m (7 ft 1 in) | Panathinaikos | (Greece) |

Head coach

- Kostas Politis

Legend

- Club – describes last
  club before the tournament
- Age – describes age
  on 26 May 1983

=== Italy ===
Italy men's national basketball team roster
Players
Coaches

| Pos. | No. | Name | Age – Date of birth | Height | Club |
|---|---|---|---|---|---|---|
| PG | 4 | Carlo Caglieris | 31 – 2 July 1951 | 1.77 m (5 ft 10 in) | Auxilium Torino | (Italy) |
| F | 5 | Alberto Tonut | 21 – 19 April 1962 | 2.02 m (6 ft 8 in) | Trieste | (Italy) |
| F | 6 | Marco Bonamico | 26 – 18 January 1957 | 2.01 m (6 ft 7 in) | Virtus Bologna | (Italy) |
| G | 7 | Enrico Gilardi | 26 – 9 January 1957 | 1.93 m (6 ft 4 in) | Virtus Roma | (Italy) |
| C | 8 | Ario Costa | 21 – 26 September 1961 | 2.11 m (6 ft 11 in) | Basket Brescia | (Italy) |
| PG | 9 | Roberto Brunamonti | 24 – 14 April 1959 | 1.91 m (6 ft 3 in) | Virtus Bologna | (Italy) |
| PF | 10 | Renato Villalta | 28 – 3 February 1955 | 2.04 m (6 ft 8 in) | Virtus Bologna | (Italy) |
| C | 11 | Dino Meneghin | 33 – 18 January 1950 | 2.04 m (6 ft 8 in) | Olimpia Milano | (Italy) |
| G | 12 | Antonello Riva | 21 – 28 February 1962 | 1.96 m (6 ft 5 in) | Ford Cantù | (Italy) |
| C | 13 | Renzo Vecchiato | 27 – 8 August 1955 | 2.07 m (6 ft 9 in) | Auxilium Torino | (Italy) |
| PG | 14 | Pierluigi Marzorati | 30 – 12 September 1952 | 1.87 m (6 ft 2 in) | Ford Cantù | (Italy) |
| F | 15 | Romeo Sacchetti | 29 – 20 August 1953 | 1.99 m (6 ft 6 in) | Auxilium Torino | (Italy) |

Head coach

- Sandro Gamba

Legend

- Club – describes last
  club before the tournament
- Age – describes age
  on 26 May 1983

=== Spain ===
Spain men's national basketball team roster
Players
Coaches

| Pos. | No. | Name | Age – Date of birth | Height | Club |
|---|---|---|---|---|---|---|
| PF | 4 | Fernando Arcega | 23 – 3 April 1960 | 2.04 m (6 ft 8 in) | CB Zaragoza | (Spain) |
| PG | 5 | Joan Creus | 26 – 24 November 1956 | 1.76 m (5 ft 9 in) | CB Granollers | (Spain) |
| F | 6 | Chicho Sibilio | 24 – 3 October 1958 | 2.00 m (6 ft 7 in) | FC Barcelona | (Spain) |
| SF | 7 | Josep Maria Margall | 28 – 17 March 1955 | 1.98 m (6 ft 6 in) | Joventut Badalona | (Spain) |
| PF | 8 | Andrés Jiménez | 20 – 6 June 1962 | 2.05 m (6 ft 9 in) | Círcol Catòlic de Badalona | (Spain) |
| C | 9 | Fernando Romay | 23 – 23 September 1959 | 2.13 m (7 ft 0 in) | Real Madrid | (Spain) |
| F/C | 10 | Fernando Martín | 21 – 25 March 1962 | 2.05 m (6 ft 9 in) | Real Madrid | (Spain) |
| PG | 11 | Juan Antonio Corbalán | 28 – 3 August 1954 | 1.84 m (6 ft 0 in) | Real Madrid | (Spain) |
| PG | 12 | Ignacio Solozábal | 25 – 8 January 1958 | 1.85 m (6 ft 1 in) | FC Barcelona | (Spain) |
| C | 13 | Juan Domingo de la Cruz | 29 – 6 February 1954 | 2.06 m (6 ft 9 in) | FC Barcelona | (Spain) |
| SG | 14 | Juan Manuel López Iturriaga | 24 – 4 February 1959 | 1.94 m (6 ft 4 in) | Real Madrid | (Spain) |
| SF | 15 | Juan Antonio San Epifanio | 23 – 12 June 1959 | 1.98 m (6 ft 6 in) | FC Barcelona | (Spain) |

Head coach

- Antonio Díaz-Miguel

Legend

- Club – describes last
  club before the tournament
- Age – describes age
  on 26 May 1983

=== Sweden ===
Sweden men's national basketball team roster
Players
Coaches

| Pos. | No. | Name | Age – Date of birth | Height | Club |
|---|---|---|---|---|---|---|
| F | 4 | Bill Magarity | 31 – 18 May 1952 | 1.98 m (6 ft 6 in) | Södertälje Kings | (Sweden) |
| PG | 5 | Bernt Malion | 25 – 15 August 1957 | 2.06 m (6 ft 9 in) |
| F | 6 | Peter Nyström | – |
| F | 7 | Jerry Sehlberg | – |
| PG | 8 | Thomas Nordgren | 26 – 10 August 1956 | 1.82 m (6 ft 0 in) |
| F | 9 | Jonte Karlsson | 25 – 20 September 1957 | 2.03 m (6 ft 8 in) | Södertälje Kings | (Sweden) |
| PG | 10 | Kenny Grant | – |
| F | 11 | Bo Faleström | – |
| C | 12 | Roland Rahm | 27 – 18 August 1955 | 2.05 m (6 ft 9 in) | Alvik | (Sweden) |
| C | 13 | Sten Feldreich | – | 2.11 m (6 ft 11 in) | Alvik | (Sweden) |
| C | 14 | Göran Eriksson | – |
| F | 15 | Åke Skyttevall | 27 – 28 February 1956 | 1.98 m (6 ft 6 in) |

Head coach

- Sven Jensen

Legend

- Club – describes last
  club before the tournament
- Age – describes age
  on 26 May 1983

=== Yugoslavia ===
Yugoslavia men's national basketball team roster
Players
Coaches

| Pos. | No. | Name | Age – Date of birth | Height | Club |
|---|---|---|---|---|---|---|
| SG | 4 | Dražen Petrović | 18 – 22 October 1964 | 1.96 m (6 ft 5 in) | KK Šibenik | (Socialist Federal Republic of Yugoslavia) |
| SG | 5 | Dragan Kićanović | 29 – 17 August 1953 | 1.91 m (6 ft 3 in) | Scavolini Pesaro | (Italy) |
| SF | 6 | Goran Grbović | 22 – 9 February 1961 | 2.00 m (6 ft 7 in) | KK Partizan | (Socialist Federal Republic of Yugoslavia) |
| C | 7 | Rajko Žižić | 28 – 22 January 1955 | 2.10 m (6 ft 11 in) | KK Crvena zvezda | (Socialist Federal Republic of Yugoslavia) |
| PF | 8 | Ivan Sunara | 24 – 27 March 1959 | 2.03 m (6 ft 8 in) | KK Zadar | (Socialist Federal Republic of Yugoslavia) |
| PF | 9 | Željko Poljak | 24 – 29 April 1959 | 2.05 m (6 ft 9 in) | KK Jugoplastika | (Socialist Federal Republic of Yugoslavia) |
| PG | 10 | Zoran Slavnić | 33 – 26 October 1949 | 1.80 m (5 ft 11 in) | Juvecaserta Basket | (Italy) |
| C | 11 | Krešimir Ćosić | 34 – 26 November 1948 | 2.09 m (6 ft 10 in) | KK Cibona | (Socialist Federal Republic of Yugoslavia) |
| C | 12 | Ratko Radovanović | 26 – 16 October 1956 | 2.08 m (6 ft 10 in) | KK Bosna | (Socialist Federal Republic of Yugoslavia) |
| PG | 13 | Peter Vilfan | 25 – 29 June 1957 | 1.90 m (6 ft 3 in) | KK Union Olimpija | (Socialist Federal Republic of Yugoslavia) |
| SF | 14 | Dražen Dalipagić | 31 – 27 November 1951 | 1.97 m (6 ft 6 in) | Real Madrid | (Spain) |
| C | 15 | Milenko Savović | 22 – 19 July 1960 | 2.10 m (6 ft 11 in) | KK Partizan | (Socialist Federal Republic of Yugoslavia) |

Head coach

- Josip Gjergja

Assistant coach(es)

- Janez Drvarič

Legend

- Club – describes last
  club before the tournament
- Age – describes age
  on 26 May 1983

== Group B ==
=== Czechoslovakia ===
Czechoslovakia men's national basketball team roster
Players
Coaches

| Pos. | No. | Name | Age – Date of birth | Height | Club |
|---|---|---|---|---|---|---|
| C | 4 | Jaroslav Skála | 28 – 27 May 1954 | 2.14 m (7 ft 0 in) |
| G | 5 | Juraj Žuffa | 23 – 2 September 1959 |
| G | 6 | Vlastimil Havlík | 26 – 26 January 1957 | 1.91 m (6 ft 3 in) |
| F | 7 | Peter Rajniak | 30 – 25 May 1953 | 2.00 m (6 ft 7 in) | BK Inter Bratislava | (Czechoslovakia) |
| F | 8 | Stano Kropilák | 27 – 10 June 1955 | 2.08 m (6 ft 10 in) |
| PG | 9 | Zdeněk Böhm | 26 – 3 March 1957 |
| C | 10 | Jiří Okáč | 19 – 3 November 1963 | 2.17 m (7 ft 1 in) | BC Brno | (Czechoslovakia) |
| F | 11 | Vladimír Ptáček | 28 – 7 November 1954 | 2.01 m (6 ft 7 in) |
| F | 12 | Blažej Mašura | 25 – 18 June 1957 |
| | 13 | Jiří Jandák | – |
| C | 14 | Vojtěch Petr | 27 – 4 October 1955 | 2.08 m (6 ft 10 in) |
| PG | 15 | Gustav Hraška | 30 – 5 January 1953 | 1.87 m (6 ft 2 in) |

Head coach

- Pavel Petera

Legend

- Club – describes last
  club before the tournament
- Age – describes age
  on 26 May 1983

=== Israel ===
Israel men's national basketball team roster
Players
Coaches

| Pos. | No. | Name | Age – Date of birth | Height | Club |
|---|---|---|---|---|---|---|
| F/C | 4 | Howard Lassoff | 27 – 15 October 1955 | 2.08 m (6 ft 10 in) | Maccabi Tel Aviv | (Israel) |
| PG | 5 | Israel Elimelech | 22 – 22 June 1960 |
| PF | 6 | Louis Silver | 29 – 27 November 1953 |
| PG | 7 | Motti Aroesti | – |
| C | 8 | Steve Schlachtern | – |
| F | 9 | Miki Berkovich | 29 – 17 February 1954 | 1.92 m (6 ft 4 in) | Maccabi Tel Aviv | (Israel) |
| C | 10 | Chaim Zlotikman | 26 – 17 March 1957 |
| PG | 11 | Shmuel Zisman | – |
| G/F | 12 | Doron Jamchi | 21 – 1 July 1961 | 1.98 m (6 ft 6 in) | Ironi Ramat Gan | (Israel) |
| C | 13 | Ofer Yaakobi | – |
| | 14 | Niv Bogin | 22 – 29 July 1960 |
| C | 15 | Johan Willis | 30 – 23 September 1952 |

Head coach

- Ralph Klein

Legend

- Club – describes last
  club before the tournament
- Age – describes age
  on 26 May 1983

=== Netherlands ===
Netherlands men's national basketball team roster
Players
Coaches

| Pos. | No. | Name | Age – Date of birth | Height | Club |
|---|---|---|---|---|---|---|
| G | 4 | René Ridderhof | 23 – 17 September 1959 | 1.86 m (6 ft 1 in) | Hatrans Haaksbergen | (Netherlands) |
| F | 5 | Ronald Schilp | 23 – 17 October 1959 | 2.04 m (6 ft 8 in) | Black Velvet Canadians | (Netherlands) |
| G | 6 | Randy Wiel | 32 – 21 April 1951 | 1.95 m (6 ft 5 in) | Elmex Leiden | (Netherlands) |
| G | 7 | Mitchell Plaat | 29 – 1 March 1954 | 1.89 m (6 ft 2 in) | Nashua Den Bosch | (Netherlands) |
| F | 8 | Jelle Esveldt | 23 – 16 May 1960 | 2.01 m (6 ft 7 in) | Nashua Den Bosch | (Netherlands) |
| PF | 9 | Al Faber | 31 – 22 October 1951 | 2.04 m (6 ft 8 in) | Hatrans Haaksbergen | (Netherlands) |
| F | 10 | Jos Kuipers | 21 – 10 December 1961 | 2.04 m (6 ft 8 in) | Nashua Den Bosch | (Netherlands) |
| PG | 11 | Dan Cramer | 30 – 2 June 1952 | 1.88 m (6 ft 2 in) | Nashua Den Bosch | (Netherlands) |
| C | 12 | Cock van de Lagemaat | 27 – 25 December 1955 | 2.06 m (6 ft 9 in) | Hatrans Haaksbergen | (Netherlands) |
| C | 13 | Henk Pieterse | 23 – 4 December 1959 | 2.11 m (6 ft 11 in) | Kentucky Wesleyan | (United States) |
| PF | 14 | Roland van den Bergh | 24 – 6 January 1959 | 2.05 m (6 ft 9 in) | Elmex Leiden | (Netherlands) |
| C | 15 | Rob van Essen | 26 – 16 September 1956 | 2.05 m (6 ft 9 in) | Kuipers | (Netherlands) |

Head coach

- (Czechoslovakia) Vladimír Heger

Legend

- Club – describes last
  club before the tournament
- Age – describes age
  on 26 May 1983

=== Poland ===
Poland men's national basketball team roster
Players
Coaches

| Pos. | No. | Name | Age – Date of birth | Height | Club |
|---|---|---|---|---|---|---|
| G | 4 | Dariusz Zelig | 25 – 22 November 1957 | 1.92 m (6 ft 4 in) | Śląsk Wrocław | (Poland) |
| | 5 | Stanisław Reschke | – |
| G | 6 | Stanisław Kiełbik | – |
| PG | 7 | Eugeniusz Kijewski | 28 – 25 April 1955 | 1.86 m (6 ft 1 in) | PBG Poznań | (Poland) |
| C | 8 | Jarosław Jęchorek | 21 – 31 May 1961 |
| PF | 9 | Jerzy Binkowski | 23 – 12 June 1959 | 2.06 m (6 ft 9 in) | Gwardia Wrocław (basketball) | (Poland) |
| F | 10 | Ireneusz Mulak | 27 – 30 March 1956 | 1.95 m (6 ft 5 in) |
| C | 11 | Justyn Węglorz | 24 – 27 May 1958 | 2.03 m (6 ft 8 in) |
| F | 12 | Mieczysław Młynarski | 27 – 17 May 1956 | 1.99 m (6 ft 6 in) | Górnik Wałbrzych | (Poland) |
| C | 13 | Zbigniew Bogucki | – |
| PG | 14 | Ryszard Prostak | 25 – 15 August 1957 | 1.90 m (6 ft 3 in) | Śląsk Wrocław | (Poland) |
| C | 15 | Krzysztof Fikiel | 25 – 3 February 1958 | 2.06 m (6 ft 9 in) | Wisła Kraków | (Poland) |

Head coach

- Jerzy Świątek

Legend

- Club – describes last
  club before the tournament
- Age – describes age
  on 26 May 1983

=== Soviet Union ===
Soviet Union men's national basketball team roster
Players
Coaches

| Pos. | No. | Name | Age – Date of birth | Height | Club |
|---|---|---|---|---|---|---|
| PG | 4 | Stanislav Yeryomin | 32 – 26 February 1951 | 1.81 m (5 ft 11 in) | PBC CSKA Moscow | (Soviet Union) |
| PG | 5 | Heino Enden | 23 – 13 December 1959 | 1.96 m (6 ft 5 in) | BC Kalev/Cramo | (Soviet Union) |
| F | 6 | Sergei Tarakanov | 25 – 25 April 1958 | 2.03 m (6 ft 8 in) | PBC CSKA Moscow | (Soviet Union) |
| C | 7 | Arvydas Sabonis | 18 – 19 December 1964 | 2.21 m (7 ft 3 in) | BC Žalgiris | (Soviet Union) |
| PF | 8 | Andrey Lopatov | 26 – 12 March 1957 | 2.05 m (6 ft 9 in) | PBC CSKA Moscow | (Soviet Union) |
| C | 9 | Nikolay Deryugin | 24 – 30 April 1959 | 2.06 m (6 ft 9 in) | BC Dinamo Tbilisi | (Soviet Union) |
| PG | 10 | Valdis Valters | 25 – 4 August 1957 | 1.95 m (6 ft 5 in) | BK VEF Rīga | (Soviet Union) |
| C | 11 | Viktor Pankrashkin | 25 – 10 December 1957 | 2.20 m (7 ft 3 in) | PBC CSKA Moscow | (Soviet Union) |
| PF | 12 | Anatoly Myshkin | 28 – 14 August 1954 | 2.05 m (6 ft 9 in) | PBC CSKA Moscow | (Soviet Union) |
| SF | 13 | Sergejus Jovaiša | 28 – 17 December 1954 | 1.95 m (6 ft 5 in) | BC Žalgiris | (Soviet Union) |
| C | 14 | Alexander Belostenny | 24 – 24 February 1959 | 2.14 m (7 ft 0 in) | PBC CSKA Moscow | (Soviet Union) |
| PG | 15 | Valdemaras Chomičius | 24 – 4 May 1959 | 1.92 m (6 ft 4 in) | BC Žalgiris | (Soviet Union) |

Head coach

- Alexander Gomelsky

Legend

- Club – describes last
  club before the tournament
- Age – describes age
  on 26 May 1983

=== West Germany ===
West Germany men's national basketball team roster
Players
Coaches

| Pos. | No. | Name | Age – Date of birth | Height | Club |
|---|---|---|---|---|---|---|
| PG | 4 | Christoph Körner | 20 – 1 December 1962 | 1.89 m (6 ft 2 in) | Bayer Giants Leverkusen | (West Germany) |
| F | 5 | Frank Hudson | – |
| G | 6 | Uwe Brauer | 20 – 11 July 1962 | 1.92 m (6 ft 4 in) | Bayer Giants Leverkusen | (West Germany) |
| G/F | 7 | Matthias Strauss | 27 – 24 May 1956 | 1.94 m (6 ft 4 in) | BG Charlottenburg | (West Germany) |
| G | 8 | Ulrich Peters | 25 – 2 July 1957 | 1.94 m (6 ft 4 in) | ASC 1846 Göttingen | (West Germany) |
| C | 9 | Klaus Zander | 26 – 6 September 1956 | 2.10 m (6 ft 11 in) | BSC Saturn Köln | (West Germany) |
| F | 10 | Michael Pappert | 25 – 15 August 1957 | 2.00 m (6 ft 7 in) | BSC Saturn Köln | (West Germany) |
| F | 11 | Armin Sowa | 23 – 2 August 1959 | 2.04 m (6 ft 8 in) |
| F | 12 | Detlef Schrempf | 20 – 21 January 1963 | 2.06 m (6 ft 9 in) | University of Washington | (United States) |
| C | 13 | Uwe Blab | 21 – 26 March 1962 | 2.16 m (7 ft 1 in) | Indiana University | (United States) |
| SF | 14 | Lutz Wadehn | 22 – 28 February 1961 | 2.01 m (6 ft 7 in) |
| C | 15 | Gunther Behnke | 20 – 19 January 1963 | 2.21 m (7 ft 3 in) | Bayer Giants Leverkusen | (West Germany) |

Head coach

- Chris Lee

Legend

- Club – describes last
  club before the tournament
- Age – describes age
  on 26 May 1983
