= Sweden at the 1980 Summer Olympics =

- IOC code: SWE
- NOC: Swedish Olympic Committee

in Moscow
- Competitors: 145 (122 men and 23 women) in 18 sports
- Flag bearer: Stig Pettersson
- Medals Ranked 11th: Gold 3 Silver 3 Bronze 6 Total 12

Summer Olympics appearances (overview)
- 1896; 1900; 1904; 1908; 1912; 1920; 1924; 1928; 1932; 1936; 1948; 1952; 1956; 1960; 1964; 1968; 1972; 1976; 1980; 1984; 1988; 1992; 1996; 2000; 2004; 2008; 2012; 2016; 2020; 2024; 2028

Other related appearances
- 1906 Intercalated Games

Sweden competed at the 1980 Summer Olympics in Moscow, Soviet Union. 145 competitors, 122 men and 23 women, took part in 102 events in 18 sports.

== Medalists ==
=== Gold ===
- Johan Harmenberg — Fencing, Men's Épée Individual
- Bengt Baron — Swimming, Men's 100 metres Backstroke
- Pär Arvidsson — Swimming, Men's 100 metres Butterfly

=== Silver ===
- Per Holmertz — Swimming, Men's 100 metres Freestyle
- Lars-Göran Carlsson — Shooting, men's Skeet Shooting
- Agneta Eriksson, Tina Gustafsson, Carina Ljungdahl and Agneta Mårtensson — Swimming, Women's 4x100 metres Freestyle Relay

=== Bronze ===
- Per Johansson — Swimming, Men's 100 metres Freestyle
- Sven Johansson — Shooting, Men's Small-bore Rifle, Three Positions
- Benni Ljungbeck — Wrestling, Men's Greco-Roman Bantamweight
- Lars-Erik Skiöld — Wrestling, Men's Greco-Roman Lightweight
- Göran Marström and Jörgen Ragnarsson — Sailing, Men's Tornado Team Competition
- George Horvath, Svante Rasmuson and Lennart Pettersson — Modern Pentathlon, Men's Team Competition

== Archery ==
Two of the three Swedish archers in 1980 had competed at both the 1972 and 1976 Olympics. Anna-Lisa Berglund and Rolf Svensson were both less successful than they had been in Montreal four years before.
Women's Individual Competition:

- Anna-Lisa Berglund — 2283 points (→ 16th place)

Men's Individual Competition:

- Göran Bjerendal — 2408 points (→ 12th place)
- Rolf Svensson — 2357 points (→ 20th place)

== Athletics ==
Men's Marathon

- Kjell-Erik Ståhl

- Final — 2:17:44 (→ 19th place)

- Tommy Persson

- Final — 2:21:11 (→ 30th place)

- Göran Hagberg

- Final — did not finish (→ no ranking)

Men's 400 m Hurdles

- Christer Gullstrand

- Heat — 50.95
- Semifinals — did not start (→ did not advance)

Men's 3,000 m Steeplechase

- Anders Carlson

- Heat — 9:01.8 (→ did not advance)

Men's Pole Vault

- Miro Zalar

- Qualification — 5.40 m
- Final — 5.35 m (→ 10th place)

Men's Discus Throw

- Kenth Gardenkrans

- Qualification — 62.58 m
- Final — 60.24 m (→ 12th place)

Men's 20 km Walk

- Alf Brandt

- Final — 1:34:44.0 (→ 13th place)

- Bo Gustafsson

- Final — DSQ (→ no ranking)

Men's 50 km Walk

- Bengt Simonsen

- Final — 3:57:08 (→ 4th place)

- Bo Gustafsson

- Final — did not finish (→ no ranking)

Women's 100 metres

- Linda Haglund

- Heat — 11.37
- Quarterfinals — 11.31
- Semifinals — 11.36
- Final — 11.16 (→ 4th place)

Women's 100 m Hurdles

- Helena Pihl

- Heat — 13.46
- Semifinal — 13.68 (→ did not advance)

Women's High Jump

- Susanne Lorentzon

- Qualification — 1.85 m (→ did not advance)

- Ann-Ewa Karlsson

- Qualification — 1.80 m (→ did not advance)

== Basketball ==
Summary

Team	Event	Group stage				Placement Round				
Team	Event	Opposition Score	Opposition Score	Opposition Score	Rank	Opposition Score	Opposition Score	Opposition Score	Opposition Score	Rank
Sweden men's	Men's tournament	Italy; L 77–92	Cuba; L 59–71	Australia; L 55–64	4	Senegal; W 70–64	Czechoslovakia; L 61–83	India; W 119–63	Poland; W 70–67	10

Men's Team Competition

- Preliminary Round (Group C)

- Lost to Italy (77-92)
- Lost to Cuba (59-71)
- Lost to Australia (55-64)

- Semi Final Round (Group B)

- Defeated Senegal (70-64)
- Lost to Czechoslovakia (61-83)
- Defeated India (119-63)
- Defeated Poland (70-67) → 10th place

- Team Roster:

- Peter Andersson
- Thomas Nordgren
- Peter Gunterberg
- Göran Unger
- Torbjörn Taxén
- Joon-Olof Karlsson
- Jan Enjebo
- Bernt Malion
- Roland Rahm
- Sten Feldreich
- Leif Yttergren
- Åke Skyttevall

== Boxing ==
Men's Featherweight (57 kg)

- Odd Bengtsson
  1. First Round — Bye
  2. Second Round — Lost to Adolfo Horta (Cuba) on points (0-5)

Men's Lightweight (60 kg)

- Kalervo Alanenpää
  1. First Round — Lost to Omari Golaya (Tanzania) on points (0-5)

Men's Light-Welterweight (63,5 kg)

- Shadrach Odhiambo
  1. First Round — Defeated Bogdan Gajda (Poland) on points (4-1)
  2. Second Round — Lost to Anthony Willis (Great Britain) on points (0-5)

Men's Heavyweight (+ 81 kg)

- Anders Eklund
  1. First Round — Bye
  2. Quarter Finals — Lost to István Lévai (Hungary) on points (1-4)

== Cycling ==
Six cyclists represented Sweden in 1980.

Individual road race

- Peter Jonsson
- Bernt Scheler
- Anders Adamson
- Mats Gustafsson

Team time trial

- Anders Adamson
- Bengt Asplund
- Mats Gustafsson
- Håkan Karlsson

== Fencing ==
Six fencers, five men and one woman, represented Sweden in 1980.

Men's épée

- Johan Harmenberg
- Rolf Edling
- Hans Jacobson

Men's team épée

- Johan Harmenberg, Rolf Edling, Leif Högström, Göran Malkar, Hans Jacobson

Women's foil

- Kerstin Palm

== Judo ==
Wolfgang Biedron

== Modern pentathlon ==
Three male pentathletes represented Sweden in 1980. They won the bronze in the team event.

Men's Individual Competition:

- Svante Rasmuson — 5,373 pts → (4th place)
- Lennart Pettersson — 5,243 pts → (7th place)
- George Horvath — 5,229 pts → (9th place)

Men's Team Competition:

- Rasmuson, Pettersson, and Horvath — 15,845 pts → ( Bronze Medal)

== Sailing ==
470 class
Lars Bengtsson, Stefan Bengtsson (8th)

== Swimming ==
Men's 100 m Freestyle

- Per Holmertz

- Heats — 52.01
- Semi-Finals — 51.19
- Final — 50.91 (→ Silver Medal)

- Per Johansson

- Heats — 52.11
- Semi-Finals — 51.42
- Final — 51.29 (→ Bronze Medal)

- Per Wikström

- Heats — 52.29
- Semi-Finals — 52.15 (→ did not advance)

Men's 200 m Freestyle

- Thomas Lejdström

- Heats — 1:53.04
- Final — 1:52.94 (→ 7th place)

- Per-Ola Quist

- Heats — 1:55.38 (→ did not advance)

- Per Wikström

- Heats — 1:53.59 (→ did not advance)

Men's 100 m Butterfly

- Pär Arvidsson

- Final — 54.92 (→ Gold Medal)

Men's 200 m Butterfly

- Pär Arvidsson

- Final — 2:02.61 (→ 7th place)

Men's 100 m Backstroke

- Bengt Baron

- Final — 56.53 (→ Gold Medal)

Men's 200 m Backstroke

- Michael Söderlund

- Final — 2:04.10 (→ 6th place)

Men's 200 m Breaststroke

- Peter Berggren

- Final — 2:21.65 (→ 7th place)

Men's 4 × 200 m Freestyle Relay

- Michael Söderlund, Per Wikström, Per-Alvar Magnusson, and Thomas Lejdström

- Final — 7:30.10 (→ 4th place)

Women's 100 m Freestyle

- Carina Ljungdahl

- Heats — 58.05 (→ did not advance)

- Agneta Eriksson

- Final — 57.90 (→ 8th place)

Women's 100 m Butterfly

- Agneta Mårtensson

- Final — 1:02.61 (→ 6th place)

Women's 200 m Butterfly

- Agneta Mårtensson

- Final — 2:15.22 (→ 7th place)

Women's 100 m Breaststroke

- Eva-Marie Håkansson

- Heats — 1:12.26
- Final — 1:11.72 (→ 5th place)

Women's 400 m Individual Medley

- Ann-Sofi Roos

- Heats — 4:57.13 (→ did not advance)

Women's 4 × 100 m Freestyle Relay

- Carina Ljungdahl, Tina Gustafsson, Agneta Mårtensson, and Agneta Eriksson

- Final — 7:30.10 (→ Silver Medal)

Women's 4 × 100 m Medley Relay

- Annika Uvehall, Eva-Marie Håkansson, Agneta Mårtensson, and Tina Gustafsson

- Final — 4:16.91 (→ 4th place)

== Water polo ==
Summary

Team	Event	Preliminary round				Final round					Rank
Team	Event	Opposition Result	Opposition Result	Opposition Result	Rank	Opposition Result	Opposition Result	Opposition Result	Opposition Result	Opposition Result	Rank
Sweden men	Men's tournament	(International Olympic Committee) Spain; L 3–7	(International Olympic Committee) Italy; D 4–4	Soviet Union; L 1–12	4 QB	Greece; L 5–9	(International Olympic Committee) Italy; L 3–8	Romania; L 3–8	(International Olympic Committee) Australia; L 4–9	Bulgaria; W 8–6	11

Men's Team Competition

- Preliminary Round (Group B)

- Lost to Spain (3-7)
- Drew with Italy (4-4)
- Lost to Soviet Union (1-12)

- Final Round (Group B)

- Lost to Greece (5-9)
- Lost to Italy (3-8)
- Lost to Romania (3-8)
- Lost to Australia (4-9)
- Defeated Bulgaria (8-6) → 11th place

- Team Roster

- Anders Flodqvist
- Kenth Karlson
- Hans Lundén
- Tommy Danielson
- Sören Carlsson
- Christer Stenberg
- Gunnar Johansson
- Peter Carlström
- Lars Skåål
- Per Arne Andersson
- Arne Claesson
