= Sweden men's national basketball team =

Sweden
- FIBA ranking: 39 ▲1 (1 September 2026)
- Joined FIBA: 1952
- FIBA zone: FIBA Europe
- National federation: SBBF
- Coach: Mikko Riipinen
- Nickname(s): Blågult (The Blue and Yellow)

Olympic Games
- Appearances: 1
- Medals: None

FIBA World Cup
- Appearances: None

EuroBasket
- Appearances: 11
- Medals: None
Home	Away

First international
- Sweden 55–45 Denmark (Stockholm, Sweden; 6 December 1952)

Biggest win
- Sweden 128–61 Azerbaijan (Norrköping, Sweden; 24 August 2011)

Biggest defeat
- Soviet Union 103–31 Sweden (Budapest, Hungary; 10 June 1955)

The Sweden men's national basketball team (Swedish: Sveriges herrlandslag i basket) represents Sweden in international basketball competition. The national team is controlled by the Swedish Basketball Federation.

Sweden has competed at the EuroBasket 11 times throughout their history. On the global level, the Scandinavian squad has qualified for the Olympic Games once, in 1980. However, Sweden still seeks qualification for their first appearance to the FIBA World Cup.

== History ==
=== EuroBasket 1953 ===
Sweden's European Basketball Championship debut came at EuroBasket 1953 in Moscow. Although the Swedes did not fare well in their first tournament appearance. As they lost all seven of their matches to finish in last place in the 17 team tournament.

=== EuroBasket 1955 ===
Sweden's second appearance on the continental level came at EuroBasket 1955 in Budapest. The team got off to an demoralizing start by losing to Switzerland in their first match. Although Sweden would achieve their first ever win at the EuroBasket against Luxembourg in their second match of the preliminary phase. However, they followed it by losing their next two matches in the round as well to Romania, and the Soviet Union. They finished 4th out of the 5 teams in the group with an (1-3) record, and found themselves in the classification rounds. There, the team once again finished with an (1-3) record in their pool, with their only victory coming against Denmark. Two losses in the classification 13th–16th place semifinals and the 15th/16th place final (a rematch against Luxembourg) put Sweden at 16th place of the 18 teams.

=== Later years ===
Sweden qualified for the EuroBasket eight more times with their three best finishes coming in 1969, 1983 and 1995. They also made their lone Summer Olympics appearance in 1980. But overall the national team has struggled to reach an elite level of consistency to become a serious medal contender at major international tournaments. At some events, however, the team displayed potential. E.g. at the EuroBasket 2013 they beat the heavily favored former champion Russia 81-62.

In the 2025 EuroBasket, Sweden advanced to the playoffs in the first time at the country's history.

== Competitive record ==
=== FIBA World Cup ===
World Cup					Qualification		
Year	Position	Pld	W	L	Pld	W	L
(Argentina) 1950	No national representative						
(Brazil) 1954	Did not qualify				Did not qualify		
(Chile) 1959	Did not enter				Did not enter		
(Brazil) 1963	Did not qualify				EuroBasket served as qualifiers		
(Uruguay) 1967	Did not qualify				EuroBasket served as qualifiers		
(Socialist Federal Republic of Yugoslavia) 1970	Did not qualify				EuroBasket served as qualifiers		
(Puerto Rico) 1974	Did not enter				Did not enter		
(Philippines) 1978	Did not qualify				EuroBasket served as qualifiers		
(Colombia) 1982	Did not qualify				EuroBasket served as qualifiers		
(Spain) 1986	Did not enter				Did not enter		
(Argentina) 1990	Did not qualify				EuroBasket served as qualifiers		
(Canada) 1994	Did not qualify				EuroBasket served as qualifiers		
(Greece) 1998	Did not qualify				EuroBasket served as qualifiers		
(United States) 2002	Did not qualify				EuroBasket served as qualifiers		
(Japan) 2006	Did not qualify				EuroBasket served as qualifiers		
(Turkey) 2010	Did not qualify				EuroBasket served as qualifiers		
(Spain) 2014	Did not qualify				EuroBasket served as qualifiers		
(China) 2019	Did not qualify				12	5	7
(Philippines) (Japan) (Indonesia) 2023	Did not qualify				16	8	8
(Qatar) 2027	To be determined				In progress		
(France) 2031	To be determined				To be determined		
Total	0/19				28	13	15

=== Olympic Games ===
Olympic Games					Qualifying		
Year	Position	Pld	W	L	Pld	W	L
1936 to 1952	No national representative						
(Australia) 1956	Did not qualify						
(Italy) 1960	Did not enter				Did not enter		
(Japan) 1964	Did not enter				Did not enter		
(Mexico) 1968	Did not qualify				9	3	6
(West Germany) 1972	Did not qualify				19	8	11
(Canada) 1976	Did not qualify				6	2	4
(Soviet Union) 1980	10th	7	3	4	10	5	5
(United States) 1984	Did not qualify				9	4	5
(South Korea) 1988	Did not qualify				4	2	2
(Spain) 1992	Did not qualify				5	2	3
(United States) 1996	Did not qualify				Did not qualify		
(Australia) 2000	Did not qualify				Did not qualify		
(Greece) 2004	Did not qualify				Did not qualify		
(China) 2008	Did not qualify				Did not qualify		
(United Kingdom) 2012	Did not qualify				Did not qualify		
(Brazil) 2016	Did not qualify				Did not qualify		
(Japan) 2020	Did not qualify				Did not qualify		
(France) 2024	Did not qualify				4	2	2
(United States) 2028	To be determined				To be determined		
Total	1/18	7	3	4	66	28	38

=== EuroBasket ===
EuroBasket					Qualification		
Year	Position	Pld	W	L	Pld	W	L
1935 to 1951	No national representative						
(Soviet Union) 1953	17th	7	0	7			
(Hungary) 1955	16th	7	2	5			
(Bulgaria) 1957	Did not enter						
(Turkey) 1959	Did not enter						
(Socialist Federal Republic of Yugoslavia) 1961	18th	6	1	5			
(Poland) 1963	Did not enter				Did not enter		
(Soviet Union) 1965	16th	9	0	9	Direct qualification		
(Finland) 1967	Did not qualify				3	0	3
(Italy) 1969	12th	7	1	6	3	2	1
(West Germany) 1971	Did not qualify				3	1	2
(Spain) 1973	Did not enter				Did not enter		
(Socialist Federal Republic of Yugoslavia) 1975	Did not qualify				5	2	3
(Belgium) 1977	Did not qualify				5	2	3
(Italy) 1979	Did not qualify				10	5	5
(Czechoslovakia) 1981	Did not qualify				12	6	6
(France) 1983	12th	7	0	7	12	9	3
(West Germany) 1985	Did not qualify				12	6	6
(Greece) 1987	Did not qualify				12	5	7
(Socialist Federal Republic of Yugoslavia) 1989	Did not qualify				9	3	6
(Italy) 1991	Did not qualify				11	7	4
(Germany) 1993	15th	3	1	2	6	4	2
(Greece) 1995	14th	6	0	6	6	3	3
(Spain) 1997	Did not qualify				10	4	6
(France) 1999	Did not qualify				10	5	5
(Turkey) 2001	Did not qualify				10	3	7
(Sweden) 2003	16th	3	0	3	Qualified as host		
(Serbia and Montenegro) 2005	Did not qualify				10	3	7
(Spain) 2007	Did not qualify				10	3	7
(Poland) 2009	Division B				10	7	3
(Lithuania) 2011	Division B				8	7	1
(Slovenia) 2013	13th	5	1	4	8	4	4
(France) (Croatia) (Germany) (Latvia) 2015	Did not qualify				12	4	8
(Finland) (Israel) (Romania) (Turkey) 2017	Did not qualify				4	0	4
(Czech Republic) (Georgia (country)) (Italy) (Germany) 2022	Did not qualify				10	4	6
(Cyprus) (Finland) (Poland) (Latvia) 2025	16th	6	1	5	6	3	3
(Estonia) (Greece) (Slovenia) (Spain) 2029	To be determined				To be determined		
Total	11/35	66	7	59	217	102	115

== Results and fixtures ==
Win Loss

=== 2025 ===
28 November 2025 2027 FIBA World Cup qualifiers – 1st round	Czech Republic	97–80	Sweden	Prague, Czech Republic
19:30 (UTC+1)	Scoring by quarter: 27–22, 20–24, 27–17, 23–17
	Pts: Satoranský 16; Rebs: Sehnal 6 Asts: Satoranský, Sehnal 6	Boxscore	Pts: Borg 18; Rebs: Falk, Håkanson 6 Asts: Håkanson 15	Arena: Královka Arena; Attendance: 1,961; Referees: Ademir Zurapović, (BIH), Josip Jurčević (CRO), Juozas Barkauskas (LTU)

1 December 2025 2027 FIBA World Cup qualifiers – 1st round	Sweden	83–94	Slovenia	Gothenburg, Sweden
19:00 (UTC+1)	Scoring by quarter: 16–31, 26–18, 22–24, 19–21
	Pts: Håkanson 34; Rebs: Falk 6 Asts: Håkanson 6	Boxscore	Pts: Samar 16; Rebs: Omić 7 Asts: Samar 5	Arena: Scandinavium; Attendance: 9,128; Referees: Georgios Poursanidis (GRE), Péter Praksch (HUN), Geert Jacobs (BEL)

=== 2026 ===
27 February 2026 2027 FIBA World Cup qualifiers – 1st round	Sweden	77–88	Estonia	Stockholm, Sweden
19:00 (UTC+1)	Scoring by quarter: 22–22, 14–24, 22–11, 19–31
	Pts: Håkanson 21; Rebs: Hampton 7 Asts: Håkanson 6	Boxscore	Pts: Drell 23; Rebs: Konontšuk 6 Asts: Suurorg 5	Arena: Avicii Arena; Attendance: 9,364; Referees: Ventsislav Velikov (BUL), Lorenzo Baldini (ITA), Siniša Prpa (SRB)

1 March 2026 2027 FIBA World Cup qualifiers – 1st round	Estonia	69–79	Sweden	Tallinn, Estonia
19:00 (UTC+2)	Scoring by quarter: 22–23, 16–15, 17–13, 14–28
	Pts: Drell 16; Rebs: Jõesaar 6 Asts: Suurorg, Treier 4	Boxscore	Pts: Håkanson 18; Rebs: Bangala 10; Asts: Pantzar 7	Arena: Unibet Arena; Attendance: 6,637; Referees: Mārtiņš Kozlovskis (EST), Juozas Barkauskas (LTU), Ioannis Tsibouris (GRE)

3 July 2026 2027 FIBA World Cup qualifiers – 1st round	Sweden	87–76	Czech Republic	Stockholm, Sweden
19:00 CEST (UTC+2)	Scoring by quarter: 34–16, 27–19, 18–24, 8–17
	Pts: Larsson 19; Rebs: Klintman 12; Asts: Borg, Pantzar 5	Boxscore	Pts: Sehnal 20; Rebs: Peterka 8 Asts: Sehnal 7	Arena: Hovet; Attendance: 9,000; Referees: Gatis Saliņš (LAT), Geert Jacobs (BEL), Ilias Karapanos (GRE)

6 July 2026 2027 FIBA World Cup qualifiers – 1st round	Slovenia	79–88	Sweden	Ljubljana, Slovenia
20:00 (UTC+2)	Scoring by quarter: 24–30, 21–20, 13–19, 21–19
	Pts: Joksimović 22; Rebs: Radović 8 Asts: Prepelič 6	Boxscore	Pts: Larsson 31; Rebs: Birgander 13; Asts: Pantzar 8	Arena: Arena Stožice; Attendance: 3,500; Referees: Fernando Calatrava (ESP), Yener Yılmaz (TUR), Łukasz Jankowski (POL)

27 August 2026 2027 FIBA World Cup qualifiers – 2nd round	Finland	81–86	Sweden	Helsinki, Finland
18:30 (UTC+3)	Scoring by quarter: 20–23, 21–21, 20–20, 20–22
	Pts: Nkamhoua 19; Rebs: Jantunen 7 Asts: three players 3	Boxscore	Pts: Larsson 31; Rebs: Birgander, Klintman 10; Asts: Håkanson 7	Arena: Veikkaus Arena; Attendance: 12,401; Referees: Ademir Zurapović (BIH), Lorenzo Baldini (ITA), Ritvars Helmšteins (LAT)

30 August 2026 2027 FIBA World Cup qualifiers – 2nd round	Sweden	69–84	France	Stockholm, Sweden
17:30 (UTC+2)	Scoring by quarter: 24–20, 14–18, 16–17, 15–29
	Pts: Larsson 23; Rebs: Gaddefors 10; Asts: Birgander 7	Boxscore	Pts: Wembanyama 18; Rebs: Wembanyama 8 Asts: Strazel 6	Arena: Avicii Arena; Attendance: 14,750; Referees: Martin Horozov (BUL), Georgios Poursanidis (GRE), Siniša Prpa (SRB)

27 November 2026 2027 FIBA World Cup qualifiers – 2nd round	Sweden	vs.	Hungary	Stockholm, Sweden
19:00 (UTC+1)
		Boxscore		Arena: Avicii Arena

30 November 2026 2027 FIBA World Cup qualifiers – 2nd round	France	vs.	Sweden	Dijon, France
20:30 (UTC+1)
		Boxscore		Arena: Palais des sports Jean-Michel-Geoffroy

=== 2027 ===
25 February 2027 2027 FIBA World Cup qualifiers – 2nd round	Sweden	vs.	Finland	Sweden
--:-- (UTC+1)
		Boxscore

28 February 2027 2027 FIBA World Cup qualifiers – 2nd round	Hungary	vs.	Sweden	Hungary
--:-- (UTC+1)
		Boxscore

== Team ==
=== Current roster ===
Roster for the 2027 FIBA World Cup Qualifiers matches on 27 and 30 August 2026 against Finland and France.

Sweden men's national basketball team roster
Players
Coaches

Pos.	No.	Name	Age – Date of birth	Height	Club	Ctr.
PF	1	Denzel Andersson	29 – 21 September 1996	2.03 m (6 ft 8 in)	Obradoiro	(Spain)
PG	8	Felix Terins	28 – 24 April 1998	1.88 m (6 ft 2 in)	Tizona	(Spain)
G/F	9	Pelle Larsson	25 – 23 February 2001	1.94 m (6 ft 4 in)	Miami Heat	(United States)
PG	10	Julius Price	19 – 8 October 2006	1.93 m (6 ft 4 in)	Stanford Cardinal	(United States)
F/C	11	Kenny Pohto	24 – 18 July 2002	2.07 m (6 ft 9 in)	Nevėžis	(Lithuania)
PG	12	Ludvig Håkanson (C)	30 – 22 March 1996	1.89 m (6 ft 2 in)	Joventut	(Spain)
F	18	Viktor Gaddefors	33 – 8 October 1992	2.03 m (6 ft 8 in)	Twarde Pierniki	(Poland)
G	19	Melwin Pantzar	26 – 10 April 2000	1.88 m (6 ft 2 in)	Unicaja	(Spain)
F	21	Oskar Palmquist	26 – 5 May 2000	2.03 m (6 ft 8 in)	Zamora	(Spain)
PF	27	Zaba Bangala	24 – 13 November 2001	2.00 m (6 ft 7 in)	Kangoeroes	(Belgium)
PF	34	Bobi Klintman	23 – 3 June 2003	2.06 m (6 ft 9 in)	Virtus Bologna	(Italy)
C	35	Simon Birgander	28 – 23 October 1997	2.10 m (6 ft 11 in)	Joventut	(Spain)

Head coach

- (Finland) / (Sweden) Mikko Riipinen

Assistant coach(es)

- (Sweden) Joakim Källman
- (Sweden) Ludwig Degernas
- (Sweden) Adam Engström

Legend

- (C) Team captain
- Club – describes last
  club before the competition
- Age – describes age
  on 27 August 2026

=== Depth chart ===
Pos.	Starting 5	Bench 1	Bench 2
C	Simon Birgander	Viktor Gaddefors	Kenny Pohto
PF	Bobi Klintman	Denzel Andersson
SF	Melwin Pantzar	Zaba Bangala	Oskar Palmquist
SG	Pelle Larsson	Julius Price
PG	Ludvig Håkanson	Felix Terins

== Head coach position ==
- (Sweden) Lars-Åke Nilsson – (1953–1955)
- (Canada) Rolf Nilsson – (1991–1997)
- (Sweden) Jan Enjebo – (1998–2004)
- (Greece) Kostas Flevarakis – (2005–2010)
- (United States) Brad Dean – (2010–2013)
- (Bosnia and Herzegovina) Vedran Bosnić – (2014–2018)
- (Spain) Hugo López – (2018–2021)
- (Sweden) Kenneth Grant – (2021, Interim)
- (Sweden) Ludwig Degernäs – (2021–2023)
- (Finland) / (Sweden) Mikko Riipinen – (2023–present)

== Past rosters ==
1953 EuroBasket: finished 17th among 17 teams

3 Rune Erkers, 4 Kjell Eliasson, 5 Sture Herrman, 6 Staffan Widén, 7 Bo Widén, 8 Örjan Widén, 9 Åke Larsson, 10 Lars Olsson, 11 Erik Sundell, 12 Bengt Gustafsson, 13 Lars-Erik Keijser, 14 Per-Åke Hallberg (Coach: Lars-Åke Nilsson)

1955 EuroBasket: finished 16th among 18 teams

3 Staffan Widén, 4 Bo Widén, 5 Örjan Widén, 6 Jan Holmberg, 7 Alvin Tornblom, 8 Lars Helgostam, 9 Sture Herrman, 10 Per-Åke Hallberg, 11 Palle Cardell, 12 Bengt Gustafsson, 13 Jan Oldenmark, 14 Anders Renner, 15 Gustaf Ragge, 16 Nils af Trolle (Coach: Lars-Åke Nilsson)

1961 EuroBasket: finished 18th among 19 teams

4 Svante af Klinteberg, 5 Staffan Widén, 6 Udo Tohver, 7 Bo Widén, 8 Torbjörn Langemar, 9 Alvin Törnblom, 10 Bjorn Lundberg, 11 Lars Andersson, 12 Curt Wennström, 13 Örjan Widén, 14 Gunars Kraulis, 15 Lennart Dahllöf (Coach: Juris Reneslacis)

1965 EuroBasket: finished 16th among 16 teams

4 Hans Albertsson, 5 Jörgen Hansson, 6 Anders Grönlund, 7 Rune Leinas, 8 Per-Olof Svensson, 9 Ulf Lindelöf, 10 Björn Lundberg, 11 Torbjörn Langemar, 12 Lars Cullert, 13 Per-Olof Lefwerth, 14 Kaj Håkansson, 15 Egon Håkanson (Coach: Rolf Nygren)

1969 EuroBasket: finished 12th among 12 teams

4 Kjell Gunna, 5 Bo Lundmark, 6 Anders Grönlund, 7 Ulf Lindelöf, 8 Arturs Veigurs, 9 Ebbe Edström, 10 Janos Fugedi, 11 Jan Hjorth, 12 Per-Olof Lefwerth, 13 Kjell Rannelid, 14 Hans Albertsson, 15 Jörgen Hansson (Coach: Arne Jansson)

1980 Olympic Games: finished 10th among 12 teams

4 Peter Andersson, 5 Thomas Nordgren, 6 Peter Gunterberg, 7 Göran Unger, 8 Torbjörn Taxén, 9 Joon-Olof "Jonte" Karlsson, 10 Jan Enjebo, 11 Bernt Malion, 12 Roland Rahm, 13 Sten Feldreich, 14 Leif Yttergren, 15 Åke Skyttevall (Coach: Mike Perry)

1983 EuroBasket: finished 12th among 12 teams

4 Bill Magarity, 5 Bernt Malion, 6 Peter Nyström, 7 Jerry Sehlberg, 8 Thomas Nordgren, 9 Joon-Olof "Jonte" Karlsson, 10 Kenny Grant, 11 Bo Faleström, 12 Roland Rahm, 13 Sten Feldreich, 14 Göran Eriksson, 15 Åke Skyttevall (Coach: Sven Jensen)

1993 EuroBasket: finished 13th among 16 teams

4 Olle Håkanson, 5 Magnus Tegel, 6 Örjan Andersson, 7 Henrik Evers, 8 Henrik Gaddefors, 9 Peter Borg, 10 Martin Jansson, 11 Jens Tillman, 12 Torbjörn Gehrke, 13 Anders Marcus, 14 Per Stümer, 15 Mattias Sahlström (Coach: Rolf Nilsson)

1995 EuroBasket: finished 14th among 14 teams

4 Olle Håkanson, 5 Örjan Andersson, 6 Christian Larsson, 7 Henrik Evers, 8 Henrik Gaddefors, 9 Jonas Larsson, 10 Oscar Lefwerth, 11 Joakim Blom, 12 Torbjörn Gehrke, 13 Anders Marcus, 14 Vincent Lundahl, 15 Mattias Sahlström (Coach: Rolf Nilsson)

2003 EuroBasket: finished 16th among 16 teams

4 Paul Burke, 5 Hakan Larsson, 6 Jens Stalhandske, 7 Mats Levin, 8 Oluoma Nnamaka, 9 Jonas Larsson, 10 Lesli Myrthil, 11 Joakim Blom, 12 Fredrik Jonzen, 13 Christian Maråker, 14 John Pettersson, 15 Daniel Dajic (Coach: Jan Enjebo)

2013 EuroBasket: finished 13th among 24 teams

4 Ludvig Håkanson, 5 Jonathan Skjöldebrand, 6 Joakim Kjellbom, 7 Dino Pita, 8 Anton Gaddefors, 9 Brice Massamba, 10 Kenny Grant,
11 Jonas Jerebko, 12 Thomas Massamba (C), 13 Erik Rush, 14 Jeffery Taylor, 15 Viktor Gaddefors (Coach: Brad Dean)

2025 EuroBasket: finished 16th among 24 teams

1 Denzel Andersson, 2 Adam Ramstedt, 5 Wilhelm Falk, 6 Tobias Borg, 9 Pelle Larsson, 12 Ludvig Håkanson (C), 15 Mattias Markusson,
16 Nick Spires, 18 Viktor Gaddefors, 19 Melwin Pantzar, 31 Barra Njie, 35 Simon Birgander (Coach: Mikko Riipinen)

== Kit ==
=== Manufacturer ===
- 2018–2020: Spalding
- 2020–present: Adidas

=== Sponsors ===
- Previously: Adlibris
- 2018–present: SJ (back)
- 2023–present: Nocco (front)

== See also ==
- Sport in Sweden
- Sweden women's national basketball team
- Sweden men's national under-20 basketball team
- Sweden men's national under-18 basketball team
- Sweden men's national under-16 basketball team
