= EuroBasket 1983 =

International basketball event

XXIIIe Championnat d'Europe

Tournament details
- Host country: France
- Dates: 26 May – 4 June
- Teams: 12
- Venues: 3 (in 3 host cities)

Final positions
- Champions: Italy (1st title)
- Runners-up: Spain
- Third place: Soviet Union
- Fourth place: Netherlands

Tournament statistics
- Games played: 42
- MVP: (Spain) Juan Antonio Corbalán
- Top scorer: (Greece) Nikos Galis (33.6 points per game)

The 1983 FIBA European Championship, commonly called FIBA EuroBasket 1983, was the 23rd FIBA EuroBasket regional basketball championship, held by FIBA Europe. It took place from 26 May to 4 June 1983 in France. Italy defeated Spain in the final to win their first title.

== Venues ==
Location	Picture	City	Arena	Capacity	Status	Round
EuroBasket 1983 is located in France		Caen	Palais de Sports	2,590	Opened in 1968	Group B
EuroBasket 1983 is located in France		Limoges	Palais des Sports de Beaublanc	6,500	Opened in 1981	Group A
EuroBasket 1983 is located in France		Nantes	Palais des Sports de Beaulieu	5,500	Opened in 1973	Knockout rounds and qualification rounds

== Qualification ==
A total of twelve teams qualified for the tournament. To the top eight teams from the previous tournament, four more teams were granted berths via a qualifying tournament.

- Top eight teams from Eurobasket 1981:
  - Czechoslovakia
  - France
  - Israel
  - Italy
  - Poland
  - Soviet Union
  - Spain
  - Yugoslavia
- Top four teams from the qualifying stage:
  - Greece
  - Netherlands
  - Sweden
  - West Germany

== Format ==
- The teams were split in two groups of six teams each. The top two teams from each group advance to the semifinals (A1 vs. B2, A2 vs. B1). The winners in the knockout semifinals advance to the Final, and the losers figure in a third-place playoff.
- The third and fourth teams from each group competed in the same manner in a separate bracket to define places 5th through 8th in the final standings. The same was done with the last two teams from each group to define 9th through 12th place.

== Preliminary round ==
Qualified for the semifinals

=== Group A ===
Times given below are in Central European Summer Time (UTC+2).

Team	Pld	W	L	PF	PA	PD	Pts
Italy	5	5	0	468	387	+81	10
Spain	5	4	1	421	393	+28	9
Yugoslavia	5	3	2	426	418	+8	8
France	5	2	3	399	408	−9	7
Greece	5	1	4	384	430	−46	6
Sweden	5	0	5	371	433	−62	5

26 May
14:30

Boxscore

Sweden	66–69	Greece
Scoring by half: 26–32, 40–37
Pts: Magarity 23		Pts: Galis 20

Palais des Sports de Beaublanc, Limoges

26 May
17:30

Boxscore

Italy	75–74	Spain
Scoring by half: 28–37, 47–37
Pts: Riva 18		Pts: San Epifanio 24

Palais des Sports de Beaublanc, Limoges
Attendance: 4,000
Referees: Georgi Avalishvili (URS), Marek Paszucha (POL)

26 May
20:45

Boxscore

France	76–80	Yugoslavia
Scoring by half: 42–46, 34–34
Pts: Dacoury 17		Pts: Radovanović 24

Palais des Sports de Beaublanc, Limoges

27 May
14:30

Boxscore

Sweden	74–89	Italy
Scoring by half: 42–40, 32–49
Pts: Feldreich 18		Pts: Riva 22

Palais des Sports de Beaublanc, Limoges
Referees: Hank Nichols (USA), David Dagan (ISR)

27 May
18:00

Boxscore

France	79–77	Greece
Scoring by half: 39–45, 40–32
Pts: Szanyiel 29		Pts: Galis 38

Palais des Sports de Beaublanc, Limoges

27 May
20:30

Boxscore

Yugoslavia	90–91	Spain
Scoring by half: 54–48, 36–43
Pts: Radovanović 23		Pts: San Epifanio 21

Palais des Sports de Beaublanc, Limoges
Attendance: 4,500
Referees: Milan Jahoda (TCH), Klaus Metzger (FRG)

28 May
14:30

Boxscore

Greece	83–108	Italy
Scoring by half: 42–56, 41–52
Pts: Galis 32		Pts: Meneghin 29

Palais des Sports de Beaublanc, Limoges
Referees: Milan Jahoda (TCH), Géza Horváth (HUN)

28 May
18:00

Boxscore

Yugoslavia	103–84	Sweden
Scoring by half: 53–40, 50–44
Pts: Dalipagić 21		Pts: Feldreich 23

Palais des Sports de Beaublanc, Limoges

28 May
20:30

Boxscore

France	73–75	Spain
Scoring by half: 34–37, 39–38
Pts: Szanyiel 16		Pts: Sibilio 24

Palais des Sports de Beaublanc, Limoges
Referees: Hank Nichols (USA), Georgi Avalishvili (URS)

29 May
14:30

Boxscore

Yugoslavia	77–76	Greece
Scoring by half: 46–37, 31–39
Pts: Dalipagić, Kićanović 19		Pts: Galis 25

Palais des Sports de Beaublanc, Limoges

29 May
17:00

Boxscore

France	80–105	Italy
Scoring by half: 33–54, 47–51
Pts: Cachemire, Vestris 15		Pts: Riva 28

Palais des Sports de Beaublanc, Limoges
Referees: Hank Nichols (USA), Milan Jahoda (TCH)

29 May
19:30

Boxscore

Spain	81–76	Sweden
Scoring by half: 43–43, 38–33
Pts: Sibilio 21		Pts: Karlsson 18

Palais des Sports de Beaublanc, Limoges
Attendance: 6,000
Referees: Géza Horváth (HUN), Klaus Metzger (FRG)

30 May
14:30

Boxscore

France	91–71	Sweden
Scoring by half: 41–28, 50–43
Pts: Szanyiel 30		Pts: Rahm 18

Palais des Sports de Beaublanc, Limoges

30 May
18:00

Boxscore

Italy	91–76	Yugoslavia
Scoring by half: 36–42, 55–34
Pts: Gilardi 26		Pts: Dalipagić 21

Palais des Sports de Beaublanc, Limoges
Referees: Hank Nichols (USA), Milan Jahoda (TCH)

30 May
20:30

Boxscore

Spain	100–79	Greece
Scoring by half: 52–41, 48–38
Pts: San Epifanio 20		Pts: Galis 34

Palais des Sports de Beaublanc, Limoges
Attendance: 2,500
Referees: Géza Horváth (HUN), Klaus Metzger (FRG)

=== Group B ===
Team	Pld	W	L	PF	PA	PD	Pts
Soviet Union	5	5	0	482	375	+107	10
Netherlands	5	3	2	356	403	−47	8
West Germany	5	3	2	384	395	−11	8
Israel	5	2	3	386	398	−12	7
Poland	5	1	4	357	382	−25	6
Czechoslovakia	5	1	4	405	417	−12	6

26 May
14:30

Boxscore

Israel	72–78	Netherlands
Scoring by half: 31–43, 41–35
Pts: Berkowitz 24		Pts: Cramer 16

Palais de Sports, Caen
Referees: Giancarlo Vitolo (ITA), Zdravko Kurilić (YUG)

26 May
18:00

Boxscore

Czechoslovakia	74–86	West Germany
Scoring by half: 36–44, 38–42
Pts: Hraška 15		Pts: Pappert 29

Palais de Sports, Caen

26 May
20:30

Boxscore

Soviet Union	88–76	Poland
Scoring by half: 46–40, 42–36
Pts: Chomičius, Sabonis 17		Pts: Bogucki 15

Palais de Sports, Caen

27 May
14:30

Boxscore

West Germany	67–79	Netherlands
Scoring by half: 34–36, 33–43
Pts: Blab 22		Pts: Plaat 24

Palais de Sports, Caen

27 May
20:30

Boxscore

Czechoslovakia	72–75 (OT)	Poland
Scoring by half: 31–33, 35–33 Overtime: 6–9
Pts: Hraška, Kropilák 19		Pts: Młynarski 26

Palais de Sports, Caen
Referees: Giancarlo Vitolo (ITA), Ulf Öhrman (SWE)

27 May
20:30

Boxscore

Soviet Union	92–87	Israel
Scoring by half: 43–46, 49–41
Pts: Myškin 18		Pts: Berkowitz 32

Palais de Sports, Caen

28 May
14:30

Boxscore

Poland	62–64	Israel
Scoring by half: 32–38, 30–26
Pts: Binkowski 20		Pts: Jamchi, Berkowitz 16

Palais de Sports, Caen

28 May
16:30

Boxscore

Soviet Union	90–69	West Germany
Scoring by half: 43–33, 47–36
Pts: Myškin, Sabonis 17		Pts: Behnke 22

Palais de Sports, Caen

28 May
20:30

Boxscore

Czechoslovakia	90–63	Netherlands
Scoring by half: 54–27, 36–36
Pts: Kropilák 32		Pts: Wiel 14

Palais de Sports, Caen

29 May
14:30

Boxscore

West Germany	85–82	Poland
Scoring by half: 46–44, 39–38
Pts: Zander 24		Pts: Młynarski 30

Palais de Sports, Caen

29 May
16:30

Boxscore

Soviet Union	112–63	Netherlands
Scoring by half: 54–37, 58–26
Pts: Tarakanov 24		Pts: Plaat 12

Palais de Sports, Caen
Referees: Kostas Rigas (GRE), Giancarlo Vitolo (ITA)

29 May
20:30

Boxscore

Czechoslovakia	89–93 (OT)	Israel
Scoring by half: 41–45, 40–36 Overtime: 8–12
Pts: Rajniak 25		Pts: Jamchi 27

Palais de Sports, Caen

30 May
14:30

Boxscore

Netherlands	73–62	Poland
Scoring by half: 37–32, 36–30
Pts: van den Bergh 15		Pts: Mulak 12

Palais de Sports, Caen

30 May
18:00

Boxscore

Czechoslovakia	80–100	Soviet Union
Scoring by half: 39–53, 41–47
Pts: Kropilák 25		Pts: Valters 19

Palais de Sports, Caen

30 May
20:30

Boxscore

West Germany	77–70	Israel
Scoring by half: 42–42, 35–28
Pts: Schrempf 16		Pts: Jamchi 20

Palais de Sports, Caen

== Knockout stage ==
=== Classification rounds ===
==== 9th to 12th place ====
Classification round
1 June – 14:30
Greece	85
Czechoslovakia	88
2 June – 15:30
Poland	82
Sweden	70

Ninth place
4 June – 18:00
Czechoslovakia	73
Poland	77
Eleventh place
3 June – 15:30
Greece	102
Sweden	97

1 June
14:30

Boxscore

Greece	85–88	Czechoslovakia
Scoring by half: 42–42, 43–46
Pts: Galis 38		Pts: Kropilák 35

Palais des Sports de Beaulieu, Nantes

2 June
15:30

Boxscore

Poland	82–70	Sweden
Scoring by half: 38–33, 44–37
Pts: Młynarski 14		Pts: Magarity 20

Palais des Sports de Beaulieu, Nantes
Referees: Giancarlo Vitolo (ITA), Zdravko Kurilić (YUG)

3 June
15:30

Boxscore

Greece	102–97 (OT)	Sweden
Scoring by half: 52–46, 39–45 Overtime: 11–6
Pts: Gallis 46		Pts: Magarity 24

Palais des Sports de Beaulieu, Nantes

4 June
18:00

Boxscore

Poland	77–73	Czechoslovakia
Scoring by half: 38–40, 39–33
Pts: Zelig 18		Pts: Kropilák 20

Palais des Sports de Beaulieu, Nantes

==== 5th to 8th place ====
Classification round
1 June – 18:00
Yugoslavia	88
Israel	99
2 June – 18:00
West Germany	82
France	90

Fifth place
4 June – 15:30
Israel	88
France	92
Seventh place
3 June – 18:00
Yugoslavia	104
West Germany	88

1 June
18:00

Boxscore

Israel	99–88	Yugoslavia
Scoring by half: 48–46, 51–42
Pts: Silver 27		Pts: Radovanović 26

Palais des Sports de Beaulieu, Nantes
Referees: Pedro Hernández Cabrera (ESP)

2 June
18:00

Boxscore

France	90–82	West Germany
Scoring by half: 46–43, 44–39
Pts: Dacoury 24		Pts: Schrempf 21

Palais des Sports de Beaulieu, Nantes

3 June
18:00

Boxscore

Yugoslavia	104–88	West Germany
Scoring by half: 56–52, 48–36
Pts: Radovanović 26		Pts: Schrempf 20

Palais des Sports de Beaulieu, Nantes

4 June
18:00

Boxscore

France	92–88	Israel
Scoring by half: 42–41, 50–47
Pts: Szanyiel 23		Pts: Jamchi 22

Palais des Sports de Beaulieu, Nantes
Referees: Giancarlo Vitolo (ITA), Pedro Hernández Cabrera (ESP)

=== Championship bracket ===
Semi-finals
1 June – 20:30
Soviet Union	94
Spain	95
2 June – 20:30
Italy	88
Netherlands	69

Final
4 June – 20:30
Spain	96
Italy	105
Third place
3 June – 20:30
Soviet Union	105
Netherlands	70

1 June
20:30

Boxscore

Soviet Union	94–95	Spain
Scoring by half: 50–54, 44–41
Pts: Sabonis 24		Pts: Sibilio 26

Palais des Sports de Beaulieu, Nantes
Attendance: 6,000
Referees: Hank Nichols (USA), Simon Mottart (BEL)

2 June
20:30

Boxscore

Italy	88–69	Netherlands
Scoring by half: 46–38, 42–31
Pts: Villalta 20		Pts: Kuipers 14

Palais des Sports de Beaulieu, Nantes
Referees: Don Cline (CAN), David Dagan (ISR)

3 June
20:30

Boxscore

Soviet Union	105–70	Netherlands
Scoring by half: 51–33, 54–37
Pts: Sabonis 28		Pts: Cramer, Plaat 14

Palais des Sports de Beaulieu, Nantes
Referees: Kostas Rigas (GRE), Zdravko Kurilić (YUG)

4 June
20:30

Boxscore

Spain	96–105	Italy
Scoring by half: 38–45, 58–60
Pts: San Epifanio 21		Pts: Villalta 20

Palais des Sports de Beaulieu, Nantes
Attendance: 9,000
Referees: Don Cline (CAN), Hank Nichols (USA)

== Awards ==
1983 FIBA EuroBasket champions

Italy
1st title

1983 FIBA EuroBasket MVP: Juan Antonio Corbalán ( Spain)

All-Tournament Team
(Spain) Juan Antonio Corbalán (MVP)
(Greece) Nikos Galis
(Spain) Juan Antonio San Epifanio
(Czechoslovakia) Stanislav Kropilák
(Soviet Union) Arvydas Sabonis

== Final standings ==
Rank	Team	Record
1st place, gold medalist(s)	Italy	7–0
2nd place, silver medalist(s)	Spain	5–2
3rd place, bronze medalist(s)	Soviet Union	6–1
4	Netherlands	3–4
5	France	4–3
6	Israel	3–4
7	Yugoslavia	4–3
8	West Germany	3–4
9	Poland	3–4
10	Czechoslovakia	2–5
11	Greece	2–5
12	Sweden	0–7

1st	2nd	3rd	4th
Italy Carlo Caglieris; Alberto Tonut; Marco Bonamico; Enrico Gilardi; Ario Costa; Roberto Brunamonti; Renato Villalta; Dino Meneghin; Antonello Riva; Renzo Vecchiato; Pierluigi Marzorati; Romeo Sacchetti	Spain Fernando Arcega; Joan Creus; Chicho Sibilio; Josep Maria Margall; Andrés Jiménez; Fernando Romay; Fernando Martín; Juan Antonio Corbalán; Ignacio Solozábal; Juan Domingo de la Cruz; Juan Manuel López Iturriaga; Juan Antonio San Epifanio	Soviet Union Stanislav Erëmin; Heino Enden; Sergei Tarakanov; Arvydas Sabonis; Andrey Lopatov; Nik'oloz Deriugini; Valdis Valters; Viktor Pankraškin; Anatolij Myškin; Sergejus Jovaiša; Oleksandr Bjelostjennyj; Valdemaras Chomičius	Netherlands René Ridderhof; Ronald Schilp; Randy Wiel; Mitchell Plaat; Jelle Esveldt; Al Faber; Jos Kuipers; Dan Cramer; Cock van de Lagemaat; Henk Pieterse; Roland van den Bergh; Rob van Essen
