= EuroBasket 1987 squads =

The following is a list of squads for each of the 12 teams competing in EuroBasket 1987, held in Athens, Greece between 3 and 14 June 1987. Each team selected a squad of twelve players for the tournament.

== Group A ==
=== France ===
France men's national basketball team roster
Players
Coaches

Pos.	No.	Name	Age – Date of birth	Height	Club
PG	4	Frédéric Hufnagel	26 – 24 August 1960	1.86 m (6 ft 1 in)	Pau-Orthez	(France)
PG	5	Valéry Demory	23 – 13 September 1963	1.78 m (5 ft 10 in)	Vendée Challans	(France)
F	6	Patrick Cham	28 – 18 May 1959	1.96 m (6 ft 5 in)	Paris Basket Racing	(France)
F	7	Richard Dacoury	27 – 6 June 1959	1.95 m (6 ft 5 in)	Limoges CSP	(France)
C	8	Frédéric Monetti	19 – 1 January 1968	2.08 m (6 ft 10 in)	Nice BC	(France)
C	9	Stéphane Ostrowski	25 – 17 March 1962	2.05 m (6 ft 9 in)	Le Mans	(France)
PG	10	Pierre Bressant	27 – 8 November 1959	1.80 m (5 ft 11 in)	Olympique Antibes	(France)
F	11	Hervé Dubuisson	29 – 8 August 1957	1.97 m (6 ft 6 in)	Paris Basket Racing	(France)
PF	12	Jean-Louis Hersin	24 – 10 October 1962	2.04 m (6 ft 8 in)	Olympique Antibes	(France)
PF	13	Jean-Luc Deganis	28 – 10 March 1959	2.04 m (6 ft 8 in)	Saint-Étienne Basket	(France)
F	14	Éric Beugnot	32 – 22 March 1955	2.00 m (6 ft 7 in)	ASVEL Basket	(France)
C	15	Georges Vestris	27 – 8 June 1959	2.14 m (7 ft 0 in)	Limoges CSP	(France)

Head coach

- Jean Galle

Legend

- Club – describes last
  club before the tournament
- Age – describes age
  on 3 June 1987

=== Greece ===
Greece men's national basketball team roster
Players
Coaches
Xoxoxo Xxxxx

Pos.	No.	Name	Age – Date of birth	Height	Club
G	4	Nikos Galis	29 – 23 July 1957	1.83 m (6 ft 0 in)	Aris	(Greece)
G	5	Nikos Stavropoulos	27 – 17 June 1959	1.96 m (6 ft 5 in)	P.A.O.K.	(Greece)
PG	6	Panagiotis Giannakis	28 – 1 January 1959	1.92 m (6 ft 4 in)	Aris	(Greece)
C	7	Argyris Kambouris	25 – 24 January 1962	2.07 m (6 ft 9 in)	Olympiacos	(Greece)
PF	8	Nikos Linardos	23 – 26 August 1963	2.03 m (6 ft 8 in)	Panionios	(Greece)
PF	9	Panagiotis Karatzas	21 – 29 June 1965	2.05 m (6 ft 9 in)	Pagrati	(Greece)
F	10	Michalis Romanidis	21 – 19 June 1965	1.99 m (6 ft 6 in)	Aris	(Greece)
PF	11	Nikos Filippou	24 – 15 July 1962	2.02 m (6 ft 8 in)	Aris	(Greece)
PF	12	Liveris Andritsos	27 – 31 December 1959	2.02 m (6 ft 8 in)	Panathinaikos	(Greece)
C	13	Panagiotis Fasoulas	24 – 12 May 1963	2.13 m (7 ft 0 in)	P.A.O.K.	(Greece)
PG	14	Memos Ioannou	29 – 15 April 1958	1.90 m (6 ft 3 in)	Panathinaikos	(Greece)
F	15	Fanis Christodoulou	22 – 22 May 1965	2.03 m (6 ft 8 in)	Panionios	(Greece)

Head coach

- Kostas Politis

Legend

- Club – describes last
  club before the tournament
- Age – describes age
  on 3 June 1987

=== Romania ===
Romania men's national basketball team roster
Players
Coaches

Pos.	No.	Name	Age – Date of birth	Height	Club
F	4	Florentin Ermurache	27 – 30 April 1960
C	5	Sorin Ardeleanu	25 – 6 April 1962
PF	6	Robert Reisenbuchler	–
C	7	Ioan Ionescu	–
PG	8	Petre Brănișteanu	28 – 17 February 1959
PG	9	Dan Niculescu	34 – 14 March 1953
G	10	Costel Cernat	34 – 2 April 1953
F	11	Andrei Constantin	34 – 2 April 1953
PG	12	Anton Netolitzchi	29 – 6 March 1958
C	13	Constantin Popa	16 – 18 February 1971	2.20 m (7 ft 3 in)
F	14	Gabriel David	–
C	15	Alexandru Vinereanu	27 – 19 September 1959

Head coach

- Gheorghe Novac

Legend

- Club – describes last
  club before the tournament
- Age – describes age
  on 3 June 1987

=== Soviet Union ===
Soviet Union men's national basketball team roster
Players
Coaches

Pos.	No.	Name	Age – Date of birth	Height	Club
PF	4	Alexander Volkov	23 – 28 March 1964	2.08 m (6 ft 10 in)	PBC CSKA Moscow	(Soviet Union)
G	5	Heino Enden	27 – 13 December 1959	1.96 m (6 ft 5 in)	PBC CSKA Moscow	(Soviet Union)
F	6	Sergei Tarakanov	29 – 25 April 1958	2.03 m (6 ft 8 in)	PBC CSKA Moscow	(Soviet Union)
PG	7	Valdemaras Chomičius	28 – 4 May 1959	1.92 m (6 ft 4 in)	BC Žalgiris	(Soviet Union)
PF	8	Sergei Babenko	25 – 19 September 1961
F	9	Valeri Tikhonenko	22 – 19 August 1964	2.07 m (6 ft 9 in)	SKA Alma Ata	(Soviet Union)
PG	10	Valdis Valters	29 – 4 August 1957	1.95 m (6 ft 5 in)	BK VEF Rīga	(Soviet Union)
C	11	Vladimir Tkachenko	29 – 20 September 1957	2.20 m (7 ft 3 in)	PBC CSKA Moscow	(Soviet Union)
G	12	Šarūnas Marčiulionis	22 – 13 June 1964	1.96 m (6 ft 5 in)	BC Statyba	(Soviet Union)
F	13	Sergejus Jovaiša	32 – 17 December 1954	1.95 m (6 ft 5 in)	BC Žalgiris	(Soviet Union)
C	14	Viktor Pankrashkin	29 – 10 December 1957	2.20 m (7 ft 3 in)	PBC CSKA Moscow	(Soviet Union)
C	15	Valery Goborov	31 – 20 January 1956	2.07 m (6 ft 9 in)	PBC CSKA Moscow	(Soviet Union)

Head coach

- Alexander Gomelsky

Legend

- Club – describes last
  club before the tournament
- Age – describes age
  on 3 June 1985

=== Spain ===
Spain men's national basketball team roster
Players
Coaches

Pos.	No.	Name	Age – Date of birth	Height	Club
F	4	Jordi Villacampa	23 – 11 October 1963	1.96 m (6 ft 5 in)	Joventut Badalona	(Spain)
PF	5	Francisco Zapata	21 – 7 February 1966	2.01 m (6 ft 7 in)	CB Zaragoza	(Spain)
F	6	Cándido Sibilio	28 – 3 October 1958	2.00 m (6 ft 7 in)	FC Barcelona	(Spain)
F	7	Josep María Margall	32 – 17 March 1955	1.98 m (6 ft 6 in)	Joventut Badalona	(Spain)
PF	8	Andrés Jiménez	24 – 6 June 1962	2.05 m (6 ft 9 in)	FC Barcelona	(Spain)
C	9	Fernando Romay	27 – 23 September 1959	2.13 m (7 ft 0 in)	Real Madrid	(Spain)
PG	10	José Antonio Montero	22 – 3 January 1965	1.93 m (6 ft 4 in)	Joventut Badalona	(Spain)
PF	11	Fernando Arcega	27 – 3 April 1960	2.04 m (6 ft 8 in)	CB Zaragoza	(Spain)
PG	12	Ignacio Solozábal	29 – 8 January 1958	1.85 m (6 ft 1 in)	FC Barcelona	(Spain)
C	13	Ferran Martínez	19 – 25 April 1968	2.12 m (6 ft 11 in)	FC Barcelona	(Spain)
PG	14	José Ángel Arcega	23 – 31 May 1964	1.84 m (6 ft 0 in)	CB Zaragoza	(Spain)
F	15	Juan Antonio San Epifanio	27 – 12 June 1959	1.98 m (6 ft 6 in)	FC Barcelona	(Spain)

Head coach

- Antonio Díaz-Miguel

Legend

- Club – describes last
  club before the tournament
- Age – describes age
  on 3 June 1987

=== Yugoslavia ===
Yugoslavia men's national basketball team roster
Players
Coaches

Pos.	No.	Name	Age – Date of birth	Height	Club
G	4	Dražen Petrović	22 – 22 October 1964	1.96 m (6 ft 5 in)	KK Cibona	(Socialist Federal Republic of Yugoslavia)
PG	5	Aleksandar Petrović	28 – 16 February 1959	1.94 m (6 ft 4 in)	KK Cibona	(Socialist Federal Republic of Yugoslavia)
PG	6	Aleksandar Đorđević	19 – 26 August 1967	1.88 m (6 ft 2 in)	KK Partizan	(Socialist Federal Republic of Yugoslavia)
F	7	Toni Kukoč	18 – 18 September 1968	2.11 m (6 ft 11 in)	KK Split	(Socialist Federal Republic of Yugoslavia)
F	8	Žarko Paspalj	21 – 27 March 1966	2.08 m (6 ft 10 in)	KK Partizan	(Socialist Federal Republic of Yugoslavia)
F	9	Goran Grbović	26 – 9 February 1961	2.00 m (6 ft 7 in)	KK Partizan	(Socialist Federal Republic of Yugoslavia)
PG	10	Zoran Radović	26 – 17 February 1961	1.91 m (6 ft 3 in)	KK Crvena zvezda	(Socialist Federal Republic of Yugoslavia)
C	11	Stojko Vranković	23 – 22 January 1964	2.18 m (7 ft 2 in)	KK Zadar	(Socialist Federal Republic of Yugoslavia)
C	12	Ratko Radovanović	30 – 16 October 1956	2.08 m (6 ft 10 in)	Reyer Venezia	(Italy)
C	13	Vlade Divac	19 – 3 February 1968	2.16 m (7 ft 1 in)	KK Partizan	(Socialist Federal Republic of Yugoslavia)
C	14	Dino Rađa	20 – 24 April 1967	2.12 m (6 ft 11 in)	KK Split	(Socialist Federal Republic of Yugoslavia)
F	15	Danko Cvjetićanin	23 – 16 October 1963	1.98 m (6 ft 6 in)	KK Cibona	(Socialist Federal Republic of Yugoslavia)

Head coach

- Krešimir Ćosić

Assistant coach(es)

- Dušan Ivković
- Zoran Slavnić

Legend

- Club – describes last
  club before the tournament
- Age – describes age
  on 3 June 1987

== Group B ==
=== Czechoslovakia ===
Czechoslovakia men's national basketball team roster
Players
Coaches

Pos.	No.	Name	Age – Date of birth	Height	Club
C	4	Jaroslav Skála	33 – 27 May 1954	2.14 m (7 ft 0 in)
G	5	Juraj Žuffa	27 – 2 September 1959
G	6	Vlastimil Havlík	30 – 25 January 1957	1.91 m (6 ft 3 in)
F	7	Peter Rajniak	34 – 25 May 1953	2.00 m (6 ft 7 in)
C	8	Stano Kropilák	31 – 10 June 1955	2.08 m (6 ft 10 in)
G	9	Josef Michalko	26 – 8 May 1961
C	10	Jiří Okáč	23 – 3 November 1963	2.17 m (7 ft 1 in)	BC Brno	(Czechoslovakia)
C	11	Otto Matický	23 – 30 June 1963
PF	12	Leoš Krejčí	22 – 17 January 1965
F	13	Kamil Brabenec	36 – 4 February 1951	1.93 m (6 ft 4 in)	BC Brno	(Czechoslovakia)
PF	14	Štefan Svitek	20 – 20 November 1966	2.04 m (6 ft 8 in)	BK Iskra Svit	(Czechoslovakia)
F	15	Josef Jelínek	20 – 30 December 1966

Head coach

- Pavel Petera

Legend

- Club – describes last
  club before the tournament
- Age – describes age
  on 3 June 1987

=== Israel ===
Israel men's national basketball team roster
Players
Coaches

Pos.	No.	Name	Age – Date of birth	Height	Club
C	4	Howard Lassoff	31 – 15 October 1955	2.08 m (6 ft 10 in)	Maccabi Tel Aviv B.C.	(Israel)
F	5	Mordechai Daniel	23 – 24 July 1963
PG	6	Adi Gordon	21 – 4 March 1966	1.80 m (5 ft 11 in)	Maccabi Haifa B.C.	(Israel)
F	7	Nadav Henefeld	18 – 19 June 1968	2.02 m (6 ft 8 in)	A.S. Ramat HaSharon	(Israel)
C	8	Ofer Fleisher	21 – 14 March 1966
PG	9	Ari Rosenberg	18 – 19 June 1968
PG	10	Hen Lippin	21 – 4 November 1965	1.84 m (6 ft 0 in)	Maccabi Tel Aviv B.C.	(Israel)
F	11	Doron Shefa	25 – 13 October 1961	1.96 m (6 ft 5 in)	Maccabi Haifa B.C.	(Israel)
F	12	Doron Jamchi	25 – 1 July 1961	1.98 m (6 ft 6 in)	Maccabi Tel Aviv B.C.	(Israel)
C	13	LaVon Mercer	28 – 13 January 1959	2.08 m (6 ft 10 in)	Maccabi Tel Aviv B.C.	(Israel)
C	14	Tomer Steinhauer	20 – 3 October 1966	2.07 m (6 ft 9 in)	Maccabi Haifa B.C.	(Israel)
C	15	Itzhak Cohen	18 – 10 August 1968

Head coach

- Zvi Sherf

Legend

- Club – describes last
  club before the tournament
- Age – describes age
  on 3 June 1987

=== Italy ===
Italy men's national basketball team roster
Players
Coaches

Pos.	No.	Name	Age – Date of birth	Height	Club
PG	4	Piero Montecchi	24 – 1 March 1963	1.94 m (6 ft 4 in)	Pallacanestro Reggiana	(Italy)
PG	5	Ferdinando Gentile	20 – 1 January 1967	1.90 m (6 ft 3 in)	Juvecaserta Basket	(Italy)
C	6	Walter Magnifico	25 – 18 June 1961	2.09 m (6 ft 10 in)	Victoria Libertas Pesaro	(Italy)
F	7	Alberto Tonut	25 – 19 April 1962	2.02 m (6 ft 8 in)	Libertas Livorno	(Italy)
G	8	Massimo Iacopini	23 – 10 May 1964		Benetton Treviso	(Italy)
PG	9	Roberto Brunamonti	28 – 14 April 1959	1.91 m (6 ft 3 in)	Virtus Bologna	(Italy)
PF	10	Renato Villalta	32 – 3 February 1955	2.04 m (6 ft 8 in)	Virtus Bologna	(Italy)
C	11	Angelo Gilardi	21 – 21 February 1966	2.07 m (6 ft 9 in)	Unione Ginnastica Goriziana	(Italy)
F	12	Antonello Riva	25 – 28 February 1962	1.96 m (6 ft 5 in)	Pallacanestro Cantù	(Italy)
F	13	Riccardo Morandotti	21 – 18 September 1965	2.00 m (6 ft 7 in)	Auxilium Torino	(Italy)
C	14	Ario Costa	25 – 26 September 1961	2.11 m (6 ft 11 in)	Victoria Libertas Pesaro	(Italy)
C	15	Flavio Carera	24 – 18 January 1963	2.06 m (6 ft 9 in)	Libertas Livorno	(Italy)

Head coach

- Valerio Bianchini

Legend

- Club – describes last
  club before the tournament
- Age – describes age
  on 3 June 1987

=== Netherlands ===
Netherlands men's national basketball team roster
Players
Coaches

Pos.	No.	Name	Age – Date of birth	Height	Club
PG	4	John Emanuels	24 – 25 February 1963
F	5	Ronald Schilp	27 – 17 October 1959
PG	6	Marco de Waard	25 – 23 November 1961
G	7	Cees van Rootselaar	21 – 4 April 1966
F	8	Jelle Esveldt	27 – 16 May 1960
F	9	Okke te Velde	20 – 12 August 1966
C	10	Rik Smits	20 – 23 August 1966	2.24 m (7 ft 4 in)	Marist College	(United States)
F	11	Chris van Dinten	24 – 5 September 1962
C	12	Peter van Noord	–
F	13	Toon van Helfteren	36 – 20 February 1951	2.01 m (6 ft 7 in)	DAS Delft	(Netherlands)
C	14	Henk Pieterse	27 – 4 December 1959
F	15	Jos Kuipers	25 – 10 December 1961

Head coach

- Ruud Harrewijn

Legend

- Club – describes last
  club before the tournament
- Age – describes age
  on 3 June 1987

=== Poland ===
Poland men's national basketball team roster
Players
Coaches

Pos.	No.	Name	Age – Date of birth	Height	Club
G	4	Dariusz Zelig	29 – 22 November 1957	1.92 m (6 ft 4 in)	Śląsk Wrocław	(Poland)
PG	5	Ryszard Prostak	29 – 15 August 1957	1.90 m (6 ft 3 in)
F	6	Mirosław Boryca	–
G	7	Marek Sobczyński	23 – 29 October 1963
C	8	Jarosław Jęchorek	26 – 31 May 1961
PF	9	Jerzy Binkowski	27 – 12 June 1959	2.06 m (6 ft 9 in)	Gwardia Wrocław (basketball)	(Poland)
PG	10	Dariusz Szczubiał	29 – 5 September 1957	1.90 m (6 ft 3 in)	SK Oroszlanyi Bányasz	(Hungary)
C	11	Dariusz Kobylański	–
F	12	Adam Fiedler	21 – 19 December 1965	1.97 m (6 ft 6 in)	Bobry Bytom	(Poland)
F	13	Jerzy Kołodziejczak	20 – 2 April 1967
C	14	Henryk Wardach	23 – 22 February 1964
C	15	Krzysztof Fikiel	29 – 3 February 1958	2.06 m (6 ft 9 in)	Wisła Kraków	(Poland)

Head coach

- Andrzej Kuchar

Legend

- Club – describes last
  club before the tournament
- Age – describes age
  on 3 June 1987

=== West Germany ===
West Germany men's national basketball team roster
Players
Coaches

Pos.	No.	Name	Age – Date of birth	Height	Club
PG	4	Armin Andres	28 – 5 April 1959	1.80 m (5 ft 11 in)	1.FC 01 Bamberg	(West Germany)
PG	5	Christoph Körner	24 – 1 December 1962	1.89 m (6 ft 2 in)	Bayer 04 Leverkusen	(West Germany)
PG	6	Michael Koch	21 – 13 January 1966	1.90 m (6 ft 3 in)	Medi Bayreuth	(West Germany)
F	7	Henning Harnisch	19 – 15 April 1968	2.02 m (6 ft 8 in)	Gießen 46ers	(West Germany)
C	8	Jens Kujawa	22 – 28 January 1965	2.13 m (7 ft 0 in)	University of Illinois at Urbana-Champaign	(United States)
C	9	Chris Welp	23 – 2 January 1964	2.13 m (7 ft 0 in)	Philadelphia 76ers	(United States)
PF	10	Sven Meyer	23 – 26 June 1963
F	11	Michael Pappert	29 – 15 August 1957	2.00 m (6 ft 7 in)	Bayer 04 Leverkusen	(West Germany)
PF	12	Hansi Gnad	23 – 4 June 1963	2.08 m (6 ft 10 in)	University of Alaska Anchorage	(United States)
F	13	Lutz Wadehn	26 – 28 February 1961	2.01 m (6 ft 7 in)	Bayer 04 Leverkusen	(West Germany)
C	14	Gunther Behnke	24 – 19 January 1963	2.21 m (7 ft 3 in)	Bayer 04 Leverkusen	(West Germany)
F	15	Mike Jackel	–	1.99 m (6 ft 6 in)	BSC Saturn Köln	(West Germany)

Head coach

- Ralph Klein

Legend

- Club – describes last
  club before the tournament
- Age – describes age
  on 3 June 1987
