= Feldreich =

Feldreich is a surname. Notable people with the surname include:

- Bengt Feldreich (1925–2019), Swedish radio and television journalist, television producer, and television presenter
- Sten Feldreich (born 1955), Swedish basketball player
