= Pelle Larsson =

Swedish basketball player (born 2001)

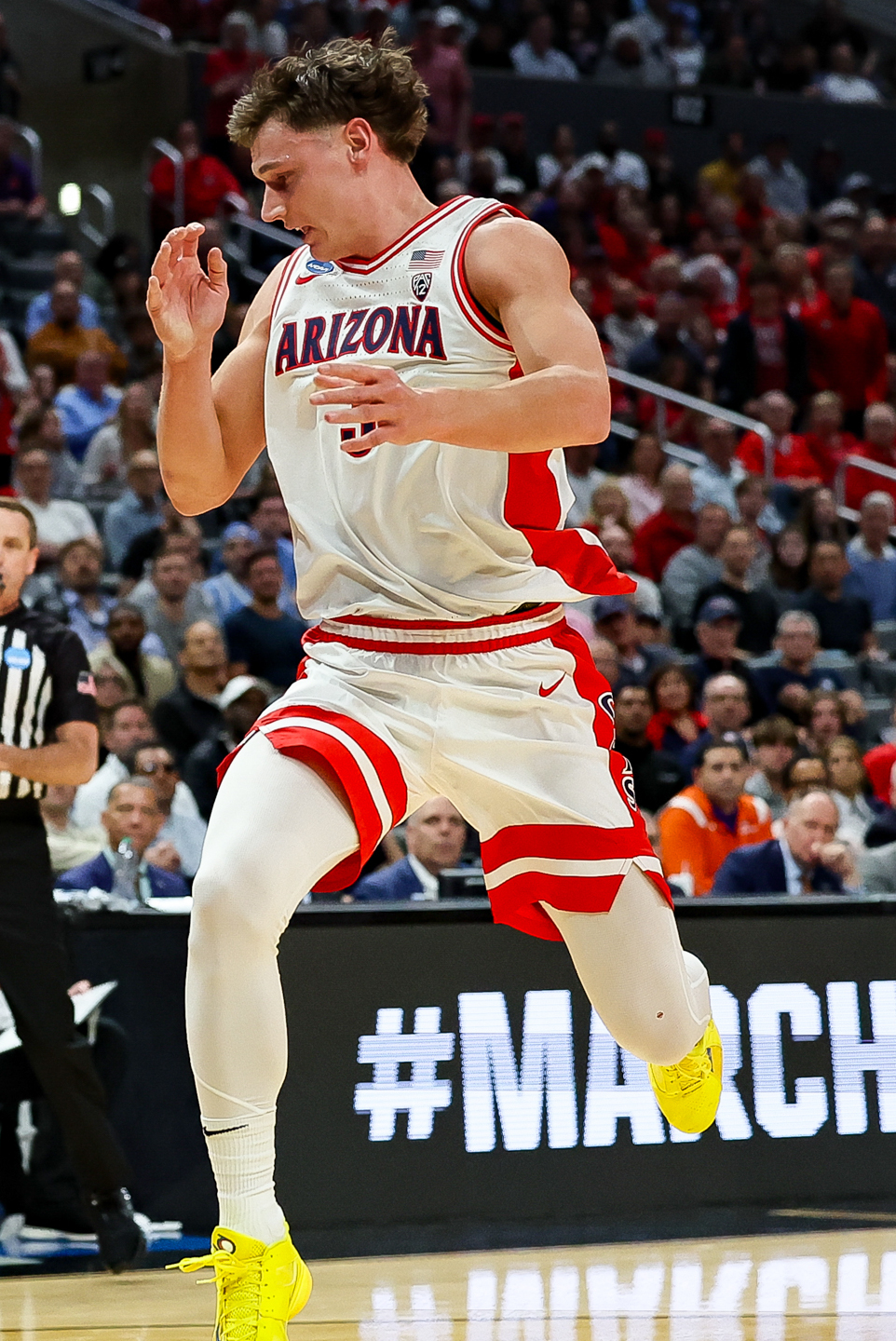
- Larsson with the Arizona Wildcats in 2024

No. 9 – Miami Heat
- Position: Shooting guard / small forward
- League: NBA

Personal information
- Born: 23 February 2001 (age 25) Stockholm, Sweden
- Listed height: 6 ft 5 in (1.96 m)
- Listed weight: 215 lb (98 kg)

Career information
- College: Utah (2020–2021); Arizona (2021–2024)
- NBA draft: 2024: 2nd round, 44th overall pick
- Drafted by: Houston Rockets
- Playing career: 2018–present

Career history
- 2018–2019: RIG Luleå
- 2019–2020: BC Luleå
- 2024–present: Miami Heat
- 2025: →Sioux Falls Skyforce

Career highlights
- Second-team All-Pac-12 (2024); Pac-12 Sixth Man of the Year (2022); Second-team Academic All-American (2024)
- Stats at NBA.com
- Stats at Basketball Reference

Pelle Gustav Gösta Larsson (born 23 February 2001) is a Swedish professional basketball player for the Miami Heat of the National Basketball Association (NBA). He played college basketball for the Utah Utes and the Arizona Wildcats.

== Early life and career ==
Larsson grew up in Stockholm, Sweden, and is the son of Christian Larsson, a former member of the Sweden men's national basketball team. As a youth, he played for the local Skuru IK basketball team before moving north at age 16 to join BC Luleå. He played two seasons with RIG Luleå and BC Luleå in the Swedish Basketball League, being named the league's star of the year in his first season at the top level with averages of 7.6 points, 2.8 rebounds, 1.9 assists and 0.8 steals per game.

== College career ==
Larsson moved to the United States in 2020 to play for the Utah Utes. He became a starter seven games into his freshman season and averaged 8.2 points, 3.2 rebounds and 2.8 assists per game; he was 50.0% on three-point field goals in conference games which was the third best in the Pac-12, and he was second in the conference with 88.3% of his free throws made. He announced a transfer to Arizona following his only season at Utah.

In his first season at Arizona, 2021–22, Larsson was named the Pac-12 Sixth Man of the Year and appeared in all 37 games, averaging 7.2 points, 3.4 rebounds and 1.8 assists per game. He played in all 35 games and had 18 starts in 2022–23, averaging 9.9 points and 4.3 rebounds per game. He initially entered the 2023 NBA draft but later announced he was returning to Arizona for his senior year in 2023–24.

== Professional career ==
On 27 June 2024, Larsson was selected with the 44th overall pick by the Houston Rockets in the 2024 NBA draft; however, immediately on draft night, he was traded to the Miami Heat in exchange for AJ Griffin via a three-way trade with the Atlanta Hawks. On July 2, he signed with Miami and on 23 October 2024, he made his NBA debut in a 116–97 loss to the Orlando Magic, scoring two points. On 2 February 2025, he was assigned to the Sioux Falls Skyforce. He was subsequently recalled to the Heat a day later, on 3 February 2025.

On 18 September 2026, Larsson and the Heat agreed to a four–year, $60 million contract extension.

== National team career ==
Larsson has represented Sweden at the under-16, under-18 and senior levels, including averaging 6.3 points in 2023 FIBA Basketball World Cup qualifiers.

Larsson played for Sweden at the EuroBasket 2025, averaging 18.8 points and helping Sweden to advance from the group stage and reach the round of 16.

== Career statistics ==
Legend
GP	Games played	GS	Games started	MPG	Minutes per game
FG%	Field goal percentage	3P%	3-point field goal percentage	FT%	Free throw percentage
RPG	Rebounds per game	APG	Assists per game	SPG	Steals per game
BPG	Blocks per game	PPG	Points per game	**Bold**	Career high

=== NBA ===
==== Regular season ====
Year	Team	GP	GS	MPG	FG%	3P%	FT%	RPG	APG	SPG	BPG	PPG
2024–25	Miami	55	8	14.2	.438	**.337**	.672	1.7	1.2	.6	.1	4.6
2025–26	Miami	**70**	**54**	**26.4**	**.496**	.323	**.797**	**3.5**	**3.4**	**.7**	**.2**	**11.4**
Career		125	62	21.0	.480	.328	.771	2.7	2.4	.6	.2	8.4

==== Playoffs ====
Year	Team	GP	GS	MPG	FG%	3P%	FT%	RPG	APG	SPG	BPG	PPG
2025	Miami	4	0	13.0	.533	.375	.333	2.3	1.0	.3	.0	5.0
Career		4	0	13.0	.533	.375	.333	2.3	1.0	.3	.0	5.0

=== National team ===
Team	Tournament	Pos.	GP	PPG	RPG	APG
Sweden	EuroBasket 2025	16th	5	18.8	4.4	2.6

=== College ===
Year	Team	GP	GS	MPG	FG%	3P%	FT%	RPG	APG	SPG	BPG	PPG
2020–21	Utah	25	18	26.6	.467	**.463**	**.883**	3.2	2.8	.7	**.5**	8.2
2021–22	Arizona	**37**	2	20.7	.478	.363	.813	3.4	1.8	.8	.2	7.2
2022–23	Arizona	35	18	27.4	.472	.356	.835	**4.3**	3.1	.8	.2	9.9
2023–24	Arizona	36	**36**	**30.1**	**.519**	.426	.750	4.1	**3.7**	**.9**	.2	**12.8**
Career		133	74	26.1	.490	.397	.813	3.8	2.8	.8	.3	9.6

== Personal life ==
Larsson is a close friend with Real Madrid forward Mikael Jantunen, with whom he shared a flat when playing in Utah.
