= Ludvig Håkanson =

Swedish basketball player (born 1996)

Ludde Håkanson
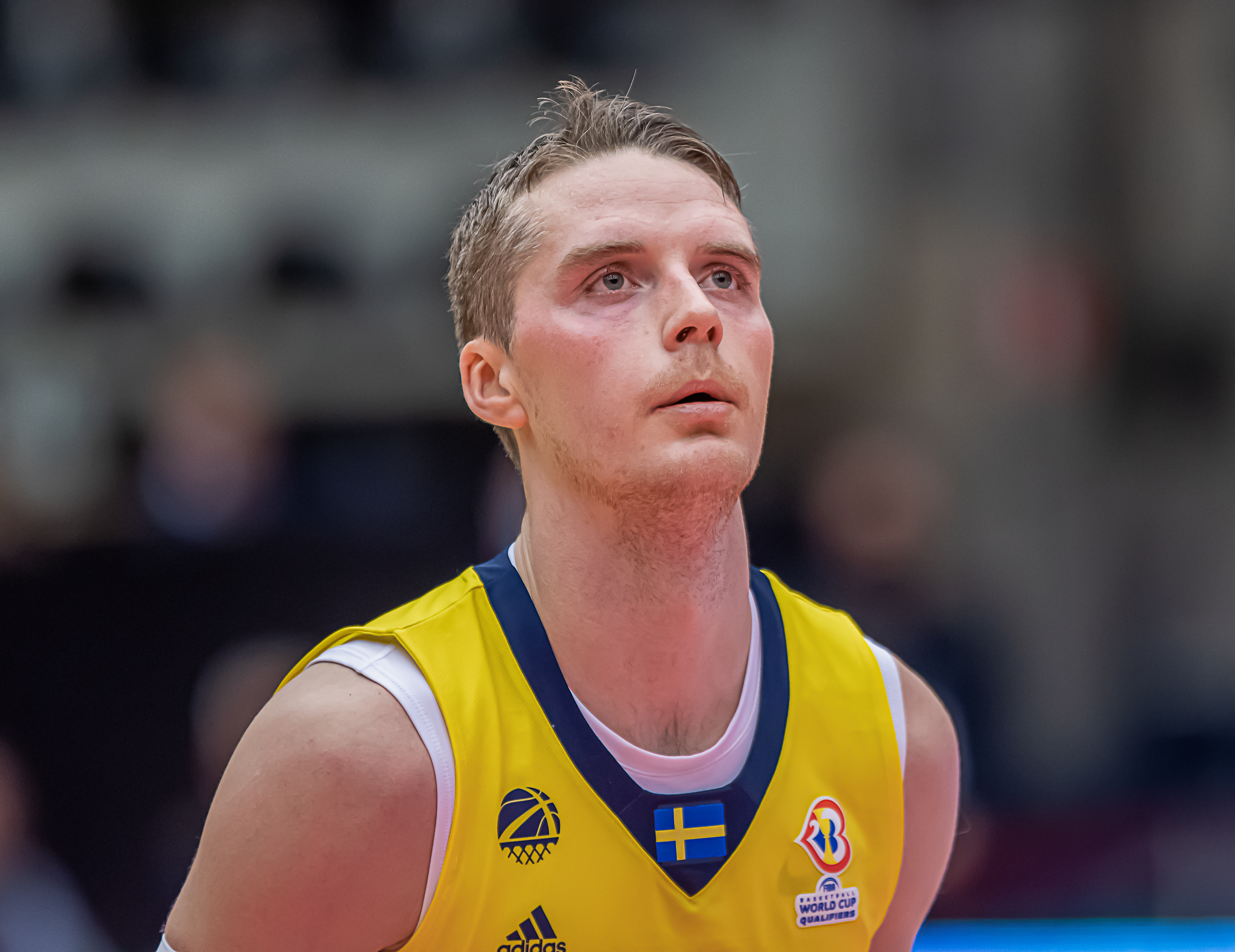
- Håkanson in 2022

No. 12 – Joventut Badalona
- Position: Point guard / shooting guard
- League: Liga ACB

Personal information
- Born: 22 March 1996 (age 30) Stockholm, Sweden
- Listed height: 1.93 m (6 ft 4 in)
- Listed weight: 88 kg (194 lb)

Career information
- Playing career: 2012–present

Career history
- 2012–2014: Barcelona B
- 2014–2017: Barcelona
- 2015–2016: →VEF Rīga (loan)
- 2016: →Sevilla (loan)
- 2016–2017: →Fuenlabrada (loan)
- 2017–2019: Estudiantes
- 2019–2020: Zielona Góra
- 2020–2023: Bilbao Basket
- 2023–2025: Murcia
- 2025–present: Joventut Badalona

Career highlights
- ACB All-Young Players Team (2016); Spanish Supercup winner (2026)

Ludvig "Ludde" Erik Håkanson (born 22 March 1996) is a Swedish professional basketball player for Joventut Badalona of the Spanish Liga ACB. Standing at 1.93 m (6 ft 4 in) he plays at the point guard and shooting guard positions.

== Professional career ==
A product of Alvik Basket, Håkanson left his native Sweden in 2011 to join the youth set-up of FC Barcelona. He secured himself a spot on Barca's farm team, FC Barcelona B, for the 2012–13 season. He then played with the senior men's team of FC Barcelona in the 2014–15 season.

In the 2015–2016 season, he played on loan for VEF Rīga and Baloncesto Sevilla. He was an early entry candidate for the 2016 NBA draft, but then removed his name from the list.

In August 2016, he was sent to Baloncesto Fuenlabrada of the Spanish top-flight ACB on a two-year loan deal, with FC Barcelona having the option to return him at the end of the 2016–17 season.

On 31 July 2017, Håkanson parted ways with FC Barcelona. On 11 August 2017, he signed a three-year deal with Movistar Estudiantes.

On 13 September 2019, he has signed with Stelmet Zielona Góra of the PLK.

On 13 July 2020, he has signed with RETAbet Bilbao Basket of the Liga ACB.

On July 21, 2023, he signed with UCAM Murcia of the Spanish Liga ACB.

On July 10, 2025, he signed with Joventut Badalona of the Spanish Liga ACB.

== Swedish national team ==
Håkanson was a part of the senior men's Swedish national basketball team that competed at the EuroBasket 2013. He also played at the EuroBasket 2025, where Sweden advanced from the group stage and reached the round of 16.

== Career statistics ==
=== National team ===
Team	Tournament	Pos.	GP	PPG	RPG	APG
Sweden	EuroBasket 2013	13th	5	4.0	0.6	1.0
Sweden	EuroBasket 2025	16th	6	12.2	1.5	3.5
