= Anders Adamson =

Swedish cyclist (born 1957)

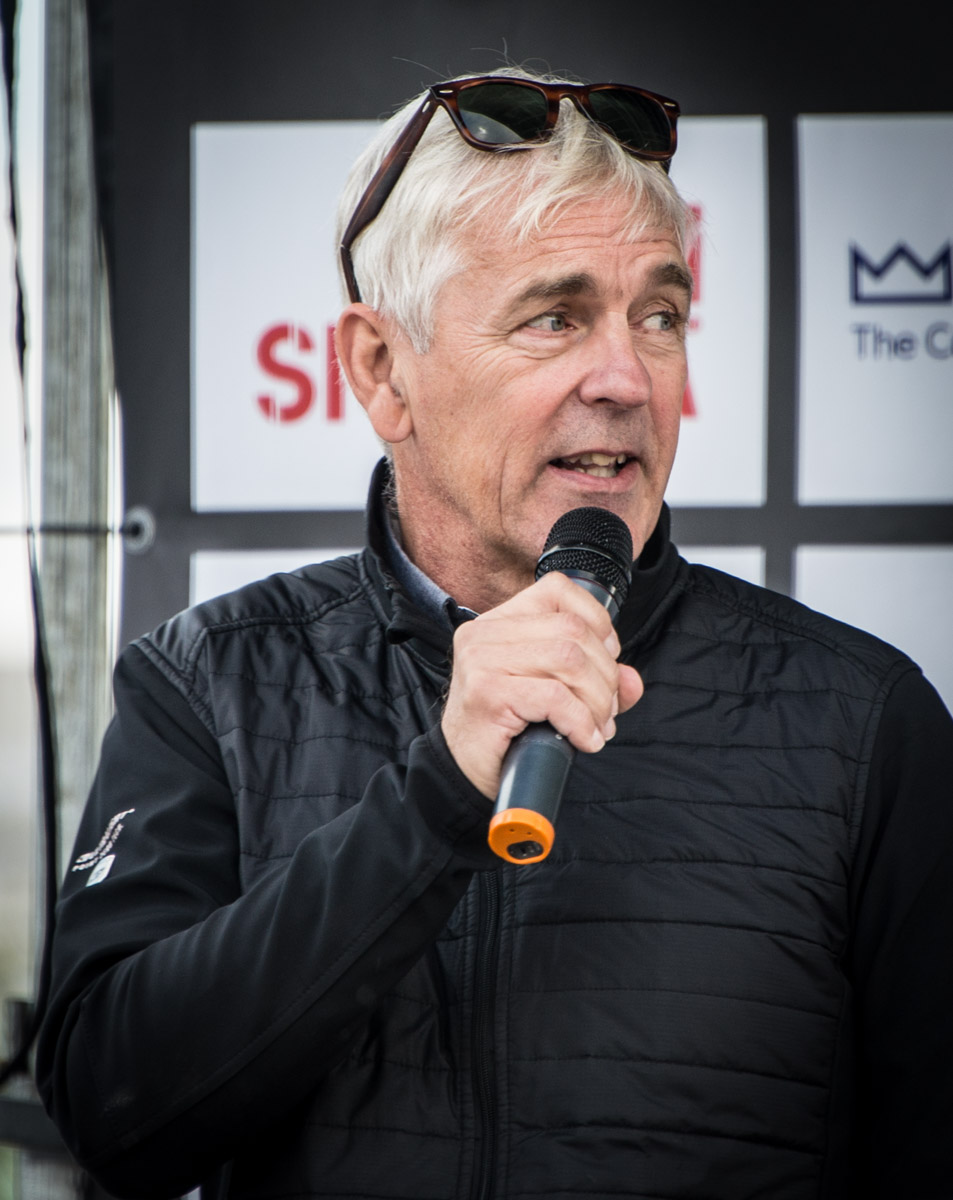
- Adamson in 2015

Personal information
- Born: 26 July 1957 (age 69) Örebro, Sweden

Cycling career
- Sport: Cycling

Per Anders Adamson (born 26 July 1957) is a Swedish former cyclist. He competed in the individual road race and team time trial events at the 1980 Summer Olympics.
