= Parvez Diniar =

Indian basketball player (born 1954)

Diniar Parvez Irani
Personal information
- Full name: Parvez Irani Diniar
- Nationality: Indian
- Born: 7 March 1954 (age 72) Cuttack, Odisha, India

Sport
- Sport: Basketball

Diniar Parvez Irani (born 7 March 1954) is an Indian basketball player. He competed in the men's tournament at the 1980 Summer Olympics.
