= Jorawar Singh =

Indian basketball player

Personal information
- Nationality: Indian
- Born: 7 July 1951 (age 74)

Sport
- Sport: Basketball

Jorawar Singh (born 7 July 1951) is an Indian former basketball player. He competed in the men's tournament at the 1980 Summer Olympics.
