= Bengt Feldreich =

Swedish journalist (1925–2019)

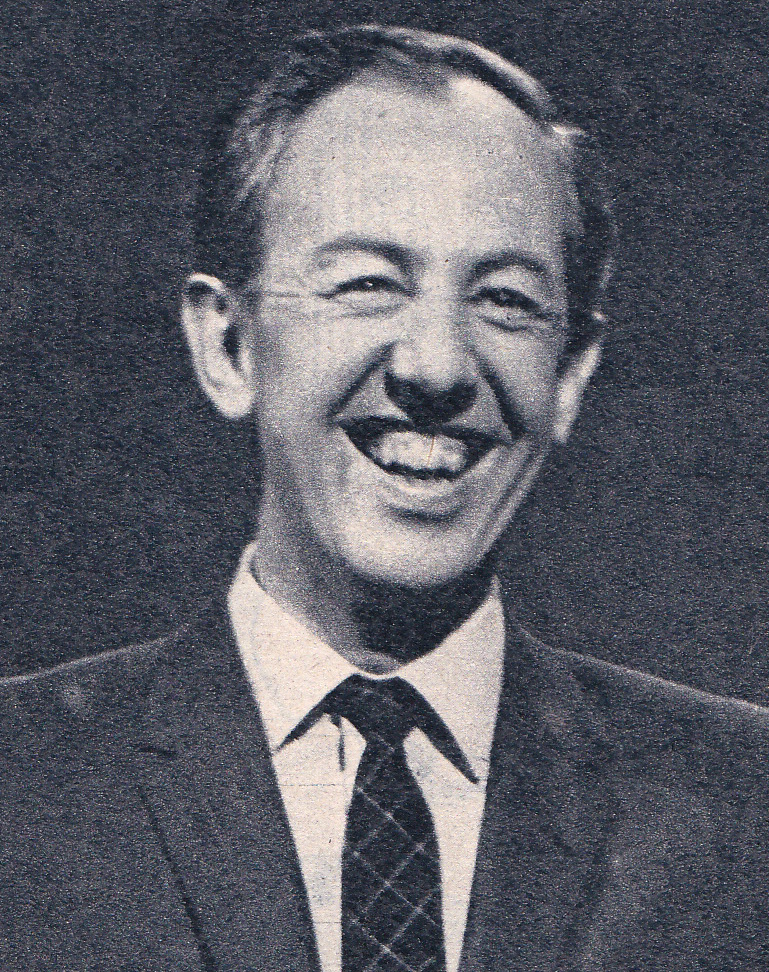
- Bengt Feldreich in 1961
- Born: Bengt Walter Feldreich; 12 September 1925; Stockholm, Sweden
- Died: 21 October 2019 (aged 94); Stockholm, Sweden
- Occupations: television presenter, journalist
- Employer: SVT
- Children: 1

Bengt Walter Feldreich (12 September 1925 – 21 October 2019) was a Swedish radio and television journalist, television presenter and producer. He worked in public service between 1950 until 1985, well-known for the interview roundtable programme "Snillen spekulerar" ("Science and Man") on SVT, as well as narrating the annual Christmas Eve broadcasts from the same channel.

== Career ==
In 1975, Feldreich was awarded an honorary degree at Linköping University. In 1984, he was awarded the KTH Great Prize by the Royal Institute of Technology for "mirroring technology and science in mass media for the benefit of research and development". He also provided the dub-over voice for the Swedish version of From All of Us to All of You, which is broadcast every Christmas Eve in Sweden on SVT. Feldreich sings the Swedish rendition of Jiminy Cricket's When You Wish Upon a Star on the same show which has received attention. Feldreich continued to add new updates for the show every year as new segments were added until his death.

Feldreich grew up as an only child in Kungsholmen in Stockholm. He graduated in 1944, and became a teacher in 1949. After graduating, Feldreich worked daytime as a teacher and in the evenings he worked as a presenter for AB Radiotjänsts broadcasts (nowadays Radio Sweden). In 1950, he was employed full-time at Radiotjänst and later at Sveriges Radio. Between 1955 and 1963, he worked for the news segment Dagens Eko at Sveriges Radio.

In 1955, Feldriech worked at Försöks-TV, which would later become Sveriges Television. He worked for some time as a main contributor for Natur och vetenskap on SVT. In 1960, he became the first presenter of SVTs Christmas Eve broadcasts called Julvärd.

All years except 1963, he was the presenter of one episode of Sommar i P1 in the 1960s, which is broadcast on Sveriges Radio. On 3 September 1967, he was the presenter of the live broadcast of the change in traffic in Sweden right-traffic change.

On 20 July 1969, he presented a live broadcast of the Apollo 11 mission as it landed on the Moon. On 19 June 1976, he presented the live broadcast of the royal wedding between Carl XVI Gustaf and Silvia Sommerlath, along with Lennart Hyland. He retired in 1985.

He was an amateur radio operator with the call sign SM0GU.

Feldreich was the father of Swedish journalist and former basketball player Sten Feldreich.

== Death ==
On 21 October 2019, Feldreich died at the age of 94, after suffering from pneumonia.
