= Adramé Ndiaye =

Senegalese basketball player (1958–2020)

Personal information
- Nationality: Senegalese
- Born: 15 January 1958; Tivaouane, Senegal
- Died: 24 December 2020 (aged 56); Lyon, France

Sport
- Sport: Basketball

Adramé Ndiaye (15 April 1964 – 24 December 2020) was a Senegalese basketball player. He competed in the men's tournament at the 1980 Summer Olympics.
