= Amarnath Nagarajan =

Indian basketball player (born 1954)

Personal information
- Nationality: Indian
- Born: 2 April 1954 (age 71)

Sport
- Sport: Basketball

Amarnath Nagarajan (born 2 April 1954) is an Indian basketball player. He competed in the men's tournament at the 1980 Summer Olympics.
