= Tarlok Singh Sandhu =

Indian basketball player

Personal information
- Nationality: Indian
- Born: 1 January 1951 (age 74)

Sport
- Sport: Basketball

Tarlok Singh Sandhu (born 1 January 1951) is an Indian basketball player. He competed in the men's tournament at the 1980 Summer Olympics.
