= Marcin Michalski =

Polish basketball player (born 1958)

Personal information
- Nationality: Polish
- Born: 9 July 1958 (age 66); Warsaw, Poland

Sport
- Sport: Basketball

Marcin Michalski (born 9 July 1958) is a Polish former basketball player. He competed in the men's tournament at the 1980 Summer Olympics.
