= Mitchell Plaat =

American basketball player

Personal information
- Born: January 3, 1954 (age 72)
- Listed height: 189 cm (6 ft 2 in)

Career information
- College: De Anza College
- Playing career: 1977–1984
- Position: Point guard

Career history
- 1977–1982: Parker Leiden
- 1982–1984: Nashua Den Bosch

Career highlights
- 3× Eredivisie champion (1978, 1983, 1984); 5× First-team All-Eredivisie (1979–1982, 1984)

Mitchell Plaat (born January 3, 1954) is an American-Dutch former professional basketball player. In international competition, he played for the Netherlands men's national basketball team. During his professional career, he played in the Netherlands for Parker Leiden and Nashua Den Bosch and won three national championships. Plaat was also a five-time all-Eredivisie selection.

== College career ==
Plaat spent two years at De Anza College, playing for the Mountain Lions’ men’s basketball team. In 1974, he was named De Anza’s Athlete of the Year and earned All-American honorable mention status the same year. He went on to play for the Cal State Bakersfield Roadrunners men's basketball team. In 1976, Plaat was named to the All-CCAA Second Team. He earned a degree in business.

== Professional career ==
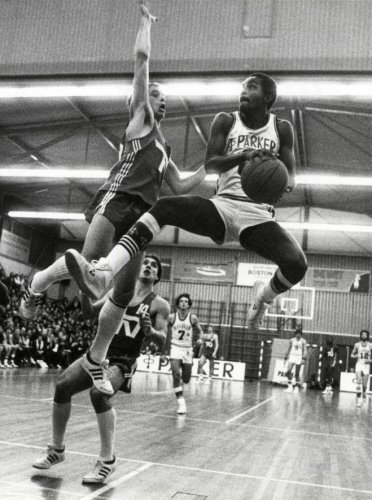
Mitchell Plaat (background, no 7) w. Parker Leiden (1980)

A 189 cm (6 ft 2 1/2 in) guard, Plaat played professional basketball in the Netherlands from 1977 to 1984. During his five-year stint with Parker Leiden (1977-1982), he won the Dutch national championship in 1978. Plaat scored 18.8 points a game in the championship season. After winning the national championship, he participated in the 1978–79 FIBA European Champions Cup with Leiden. Plaat averaged 19.7 points per game in the European competition. He left Leiden in 1982 and joined fellow Dutch league side Nashua Den Bosch. In his two years with the club, Plaat won two Dutch national championships (1983, 1984). At Den Bosch, he scored 18.4 points (1982–83) and 16.7 points (1983-84) per game in the domestic league. In the 1982-83 season, he reached the semi-final of the European Cup Winners' Cup with Den Bosch. The run included a 86-76 upset win over Spanish powerhouse FC Barcelona in January 1983. Plaat scored 18 points against Barcelona. In the semi-final against ASVEL Basket Villeurbanne, Plaat scored 18 points in the first game and 20 in the second, but narrowly lost both games with Den Bosch.

== National team career ==
Plaat was a member of the Dutch men’s basketball team, playing a total of 71 games for the Netherlands. He played in the 1979 and 1983 European Championships. In 1983, he was the leading scorer of the Dutch team, averaging 14.2 points a contest. His best performance at the 1983 European Championship came against Germany including players like Detlef Schrempf and Uwe Blab. Plaat scored 24 points against the Germans, leading the Netherlands to a 79-67 win.

== Personal ==
After his playing days in the Netherlands had come to an end, Plaat returned to the United States. In Portland, Oregon, he became the vice president of procurement for a Fortune 500 company. He was inducted into the De Anza College Hall of Fame in 2011.
