= Heino Enden =

Estonian basketball player

Personal information
- Born: 13 December 1959 (age 66) Tallinn, Estonian Soviet Socialist Republic, Soviet Union
- Listed height: 200 cm (6 ft 7 in)

Career information
- NBA draft: 1981: undrafted
- Playing career: 1978–1996
- Position: Shooting guard

Career history

Playing
- 1978–1983: Kalev
- 1983–1988: CSKA Moscow
- 1988–1989: Tampereen Pyrintö

Coaching
- 2001–2004: Estonian National team

Career highlights
- 2× * USSR League champion (1984, 1988)
Medals
Men's basketball
Representing Soviet Union
World Championships
Gold medal – first place	1982 Bogotá	Team
European Championships
Bronze medal – third place	1983 France	Team
Gold medal – first place	1985 West Germany	Team
Silver medal – second place	1987 Greece	Team

Heino Enden (born 13 December 1959) is an Estonian retired professional basketball player who played mostly at the shooting guard position.

== Basketball career ==
His most notable achievements include winning the World Championship as a member of the Soviet Union team in the 1982 in Bogotá, Colombia and the gold, silver and bronze medals with the same team in the 1983, 1985 and 1987 EuroBasket competitions. He won the Soviet Union League championship twice as a member of the CSKA Moscow basketball team and ended his professional career as a player in 1996, after playing a season with the Tampereen Pyrintö in Finland. After retiring his playing career, he coached various teams in Estonia, including Estonia national basketball team between 2001 and 2004. His best result as a head coach was a win over 2000 Olympic silver France, the first game and win in Saku Suurhall. The game in 2001 finished 64–59.

== Personal life ==
Heino Enden has a son with Russian rhythmic gymnast Galina Beloglazova, Anthony Enden, who has also played basketball at national level in Estonian minor teams. From his Moscow years he has remained good friends with teammate Andrei Lopatov and hockey player Igor Larionov.

Enden currently owns and operates "Nikolay", a pie buffet in Tallinn with his sister Pille Enden.

== Achievements with club ==
CSKA Moscow

- Soviet Union Championship: 1984, 1988
  - Runner-up: 1985, 1986, 1987

BC Kalev

- Estonian Championship: 1992

== See also ==
- 1982 FIBA World Championship
- EuroBasket 1983
- EuroBasket 1985
- EuroBasket 1987
