= Leif Yttergren =

Swedish basketball player

Personal information
- Born: 24 July 1956 (age 69) Stockholm, Sweden
- Listed height: 206 cm (6 ft 9 in)

Career information
- College: SFU (1978–1979)
- Position: Forward

Leif Yttergren (born 24 July 1956) is a Swedish basketball player and sports historian. He competed in the men's tournament at the 1980 Summer Olympics for the Swedish national team.

He played college basketball for Saint Francis University in Loretto, Pennsylvania, United States, from 1978 to 1979.

== Published books ==
- The 1912 Stockholm Olympics (2012)
- 200 år av kroppsbildning: Gymnastiska centralinstitutet/Gymnastik- och idrottshögskolan 1813-2013 (2021)
- Kroppens apostlar : kvinnliga gymnastikdirektörer 1864-2020 (2022)
