= Jos Kuipers =

Dutch basketball player

Personal information
- Born: 10 December 1961 (age 64) Hoensbroek, Netherlands
- Listed height: 2.04 m (6 ft 8 in)

Career information
- College: Fresno State (1984–1986)
- NBA draft: 1986: undrafted
- Playing career: 1986–1999
- Position: Power forward / center
- Number: 9

Career history
- 1981–1984: EBBC Den Bosch
- 1986–1999: EBBC Den Bosch

Career highlights
- No. 9 retired by Heroes Den Bosch

Jos Kuipers (born 10 December 1961) is a Dutch retired basketball player. Born in Hoensbroek, he played two seasons in the United States with Fresno State and sixteen seasons with EBBC Den Bosch. Kuipers also played for the Netherlands national team and represented the team at four EuroBasket tournaments.

== Early career ==
Kuipers started playing basketball with his local club Nepomuk in Hoensbroek. In 1984, he signed with EBBC Den Bosch.

Kuipers left to play college basketball for two seasons with the Fresno State Bulldogs.

== National team career ==
Kuipers played 86 games for the Netherlands national basketball team and played at the EuroBasket tournaments of 1983, 1985, 1987 and 1989.

== Awards and accomplishments ==
Den Bosch

- 7× Dutch Basketball League: (1983, 1984, 1987, 1988, 1993, 1996, 1997)
- NBB Cup: (1993)
