= Nikolay Deryugin =

Georgian basketball player

Personal information
- Born: 30 April 1959 (age 67) Kutaisi, Georgian SSR, Soviet Union

Career information
- Playing career: 1977–1996
- Position: Center

Career history
- 1977–1985: Dinamo Tbilisi
- 1991–1992: BC Tbilisi
- 1992–1993: MAFC
- 1993–1994: Vita Tbilisi
- 1994–1995: SDASU Tbilisi
- 1995–1996: Slovakofarma Pezinok

Career highlights
- 2× Georgian Superliga champion (1993, 1994)
Medals
Men's basketball
Representing the Soviet Union
Olympic Games
Bronze medal – third place	1980 Moscow	Team competition

Nikolay Aleksandrovich Deryugin (Russian: Николай Александрович Дерюгин;Georgian: ნიკოლოზ დერიუგინი 30 April 1959) is a Georgian basketball player who competed in the 1980 Summer Olympics for the Soviet Union and won a bronze medal.
