= Peter Andersson (basketball) =

Swedish basketball player (born 1958)

Personal information
- Nationality: Swedish
- Born: 11 July 1958 (age 66); Västerås, Sweden

Sport
- Sport: Basketball

Peter Andersson (born 11 July 1958) is a Swedish basketball player. He competed in the men's tournament at the 1980 Summer Olympics.
