= Jan Enjebo =

Swedish basketball player (born 1958)

Personal information
- Nationality: Swedish
- Born: 14 February 1958 (age 67); Stockholm, Sweden

Sport
- Sport: Basketball

Jan Enjebo (born 14 February 1958) is a Swedish basketball player. He competed in the men's tournament at the 1980 Summer Olympics.
