= Henk Pieterse =

Dutch basketball player

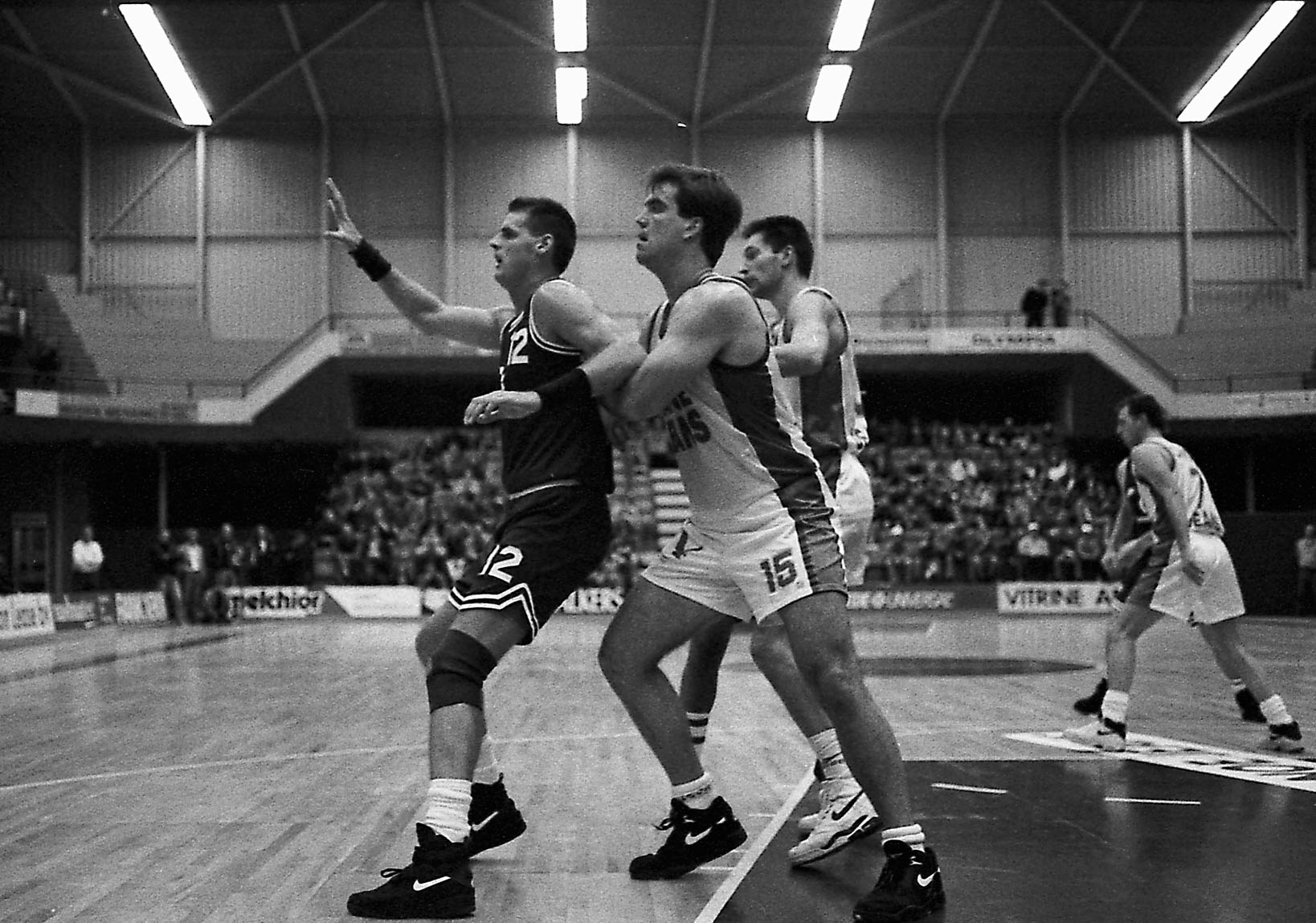
- Pieterse (left) posting up in 1992

Personal information
- Born: December 4, 1959 (age 66) Amsterdam, Netherlands
- Listed height: 2.11 m (6 ft 11 in)

Career information
- College: Kentucky Wesleyan (1980–1984)
- NBA draft: 1984: undrafted
- Playing career: 1984–1995
- Position: Center

Career history
- 1984–1990: EBBC Den Bosch
- 1990–1991: Akrides
- 1991–1993: Den Helder
- 1993–1994: BBC Willebroek
- 1994–1995: Sint Niklaas
- 1995–2002: NVV Lions Mönchengladbach
- 2002: Krefeld Panthers

Career highlights
- 5× Eredivisie champion (1985–1988, 1992)

Hendrik Pieterse (born 4 December 1959) is a Dutch former basketball player. Standing at 2.11 m, he played as center. Pieterse was a 5-time Eredivisie champion during his career.

== Career ==
Pieterse began playing basketball at age 17. He started his professional career in 1978 with Canadians, where he played until 1980. From 1980 to 1984, he played college basketball for Kentucky Wesleyan.

From 1984 to 1990, he played with EBBC Den Bosch in the Dutch Eredivisie and won the national championship four times and played in the FIBA European Champion's Cup. In 1989, Pieterse trained with the Philadelphia 76ers in the pre-season.

From 1990, he played with VBC Akrides and the next season for Den Helder, winning another Eredivisie title.

From 1992 to 1994, Pieterse played in Belgium with Willebroek and Sint-Niklaas. From 1995 to 2002, he played in Germany for the NVV Lions Mönchengladbach; in 2002 with Krefeld Panthers.

== National team career ==
Pieterse played for the Netherlands men's national basketball team, playing in a total of 101 games. From 1983 to 1987, he played in several EuroBasket tournaments.
