= Renato Villalta =

Italian basketball player (born 1955)

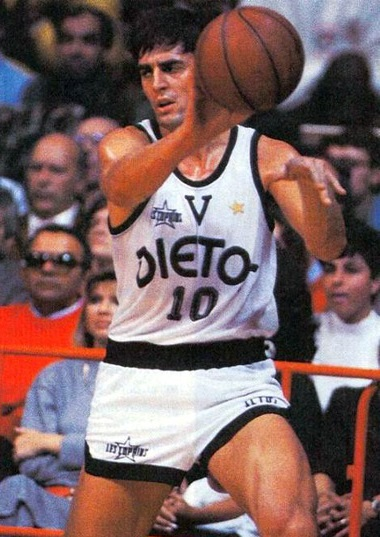
- Villalta, as a player of Virtus Bologna.

Personal information
- Born: 3 February 1955 (age 71) Maserada sul Piave, Treviso, Italy
- Listed height: 6 ft 8.5 in (2.04 m)
- Listed weight: 225 lb (102 kg)

Career information
- NBA draft: 1977: undrafted
- Playing career: 1971–1991
- Position: Power forward / center
- Number: 10

Career history
- 1971–1976: Basket Mestre
- 1976–1989: Virtus Bologna
- 1989–1991: Treviso

Career highlights
- 2× FIBA European Selection (1980, 1981); 3× Italian League champion (1979, 1980, 1984); 2× Italian Cup winner (1984, 1989); No. 10 retired by Virtus Bologna (2005); Italian Basketball Hall of Fame (2013)
Medals
Men's Basketball
Representing Italy
Olympic Games
Silver medal – second place	1980 Moscow
FIBA EuroBasket
Gold medal – first place	1983 France
Bronze medal – third place	1975 Yugoslavia
Bronze medal – third place	1985 West Germany
Mediterranean Games
Silver medal – second place	1983 Casablanca
Bronze medal – third place	1975 Algiers
European U-18 Championship
Silver medal – second place	1972 Yugoslavia	Under-18
Bronze medal – third place	1974 France	Under-18
European Championship for Cadets
Silver medal – second place	1971 Italy	Under-16

Renato Villalta (born 3 February 1955) is a former professional basketball player and basketball executive from Italy. He played for Virtus Bologna for 13 seasons, winning three Italian league championships and two Italian national cups with the club. Villalta is considered one of the greatest European power forwards of all time. He was a member of the FIBA European Selection Team in 1980 and 1981. Villalta was inducted into the Italian Basketball Hall of Fame in 2013.

== Early life ==
Villalta was born in 1955 in Maserada sul Piave, in the province of Treviso, Veneto.

== Professional career ==
=== Basket Mestre (1971–1976) ===
Villalta was introduced to basketball by Augusto Giomo, growing up in the youth teams of Basket Mestre, a team with which he made his debut in Serie B, the second Italian league, at only 16 years old during the 1971–72 season. Within Mestre, Villalta reached the promotion to Serie A in 1973–74, scoring 536 points during the season. He made his debut in Serie A in 1974, playing both as power forward and center. Villalta remained in Mestre until 1976, when he was signed by Virtus Bologna for 400 million lire, a huge amount for the time.

=== Virtus Bologna (1976–1989) ===
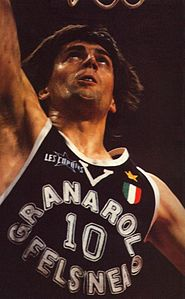
Villalta with Virtus Bologna

In his first years with Virtus, Villalta deeply changed his style of play thanks to coach Dan Peterson, who helped him build a terrific mid-range shot. In 1976–77, Virtus ended first in the regular season, however, it lost the championship finals against Pallacanestro Varese, by 2–0. In the following season, the Black V succeeded in reaching the national finals, but nonetheless, it lost 2–1 against Varese again. The team also reached the final of the Cup Winner's Cup, but lost 84–82 against Gabetti Cantù.

In 1978, after two consecutive second places, coach Peterson left the Black V to sign with its historic rival, Olimpia Milano. After Peterson's departure, Terry Driscoll was appointed new head coach. In the national finals, Virtus faced its former coach, Dan Peterson and his new team, Olimpia. Despite the great expectations around a hard-fought final, the Black V easily won the title in only two games. The team also reached the semi-finals of the Cup Winners' Cup, where it was eliminated for only one point by the Dutch EBBC.

In the following season, Jim McMillian, a 1972 NBA champion with the Los Angeles Lakers, and Villalta led the team achieving a back-to-back, winning its ninth titles against Cantù. The team took part also in the European Champions Cup, where it was eliminated in the semi-finals group stage.

In the 1980–81 season, the Virtus team reached once again the national finals, but it slightly lost the playoff series by 2–1 against Cantù. Returning to the top in Italy, the Black V attempted to become a major team in Europe too, and in 1981, Virtus reached the final of the FIBA European Champions Cup in Strasbourg, which lost by only one point against Maccabi Tel Aviv. Villalta was a member of the FIBA European Selection, in 1980 and 1981.

In 1983, the 35 years-old Alberto Bucci, from Bologna, became the new head coach. Virtus ended the regular season second, after Peterson's Olimpia. The two teams faced themselves in a historic final, always remembered as one of the best in Italian basketball history, in which Virtus defeated Olimpia by 2–1, reaching its 10th national title, also known as La Stella ("The Star"), due to the star which is attributed to teams that manage to win ten national championships. In the same year, the team completed a domestic double by adding a National Cup.

Villalta played 13 consecutive seasons with Virtus, until the 1988–1989 season, winning three championships and two Italian cups, thus becoming one of the men-symbols of its history. As of today, is also Virtus's all-time top scorer with 7,306 points. Moreover, in 2005, Virtus retired the number 10 jersey, used by Villalta during all his career with the club.

=== Treviso (1989–1991) ===
He ended his career with Benetton Treviso, with whom he played in two seasons, in 1989–1990 and 1990–1991.

== Basketball executive career ==
After he retired from playing pro club basketball, Villalta worked as a sports executive. He was the Vice President of the Italian multi-sports club SEF Virtus Bologna 1871. He was also the Vice President of the multi-sports club's men's basketball section, Virtus Basketball Bologna, from 6 May 2013, to 13 October 2015.

== National team career ==
Villalta won the silver medal with the senior Italian national basketball team, at the 1980 Moscow Summer Olympic Games. He also won the bronze medal at the 1975 FIBA EuroBasket, the gold medal at the 1983 FIBA EuroBasket, and the bronze medal at the 1985 FIBA EuroBasket.

Villalta also represented Italy at the following major FIBA tournaments: the 1978 FIBA World Cup, the 1979 FIBA EuroBasket, the 1981 FIBA EuroBasket, the 1984 Los Angeles Summer Olympic Games, the 1986 FIBA World Cup, and the 1987 FIBA EuroBasket.
