= Georges Vestris =

French basketball player

Georges Vestris (8 June 1959) is a French basketball player. Vestris has had 157 selections on the French national men's basketball team from 1979 to 1991.
