= Peter Gunterberg =

Swedish basketball player

Personal information
- Nationality: Swedish
- Born: 17 February 1956 (age 69); Stockholm, Sweden

Sport
- Sport: Basketball

Peter Gunterberg (born 17 February 1956) is a Swedish basketball player. He competed in the men's tournament at the 1980 Summer Olympics.
