= Ryszard Prostak =

Polish basketball player (born 1957)

Personal information
- Nationality: Polish
- Born: 15 August 1957 (age 67); Wrocław, Poland

Sport
- Sport: Basketball

Ryszard Prostak (born 15 August 1957) is a Polish former basketball player. He competed in the men's tournament at the 1980 Summer Olympics.
