= Torbjörn Taxén =

Swedish basketball player

Personal information
- Nationality: Swedish
- Born: 25 February 1952 (age 73); Uppsala, Sweden

Sport
- Sport: Basketball

Torbjörn Taxén (born 25 February 1952) is a Swedish basketball player. He competed in the men's tournament at the 1980 Summer Olympics.
