= Göran Unger (basketball) =

Swedish basketball player

Personal information
- Nationality: Swedish
- Born: 19 April 1958 (age 66); Gothenburg, Sweden

Sport
- Sport: Basketball

Göran Unger (born 19 April 1958) is a Swedish basketball player. He competed in the men's tournament at the 1980 Summer Olympics.
