= Thomas Nordgren =

Swedish basketball player and coach

Personal information
- Born: 10 August 1956 (age 69) Stockholm, Sweden

Career highlights
- As coach: Basketligan dam champion (2005)

Thomas Nordgren (born 10 August 1956) is a Swedish basketball player and. He competed in the men's tournament at the 1980 Summer Olympics.

As a coach, he won the Swedish championship with the Visby Ladies in 2005.
