= Jerzy Bińkowski =

Polish basketball player (born 1959)

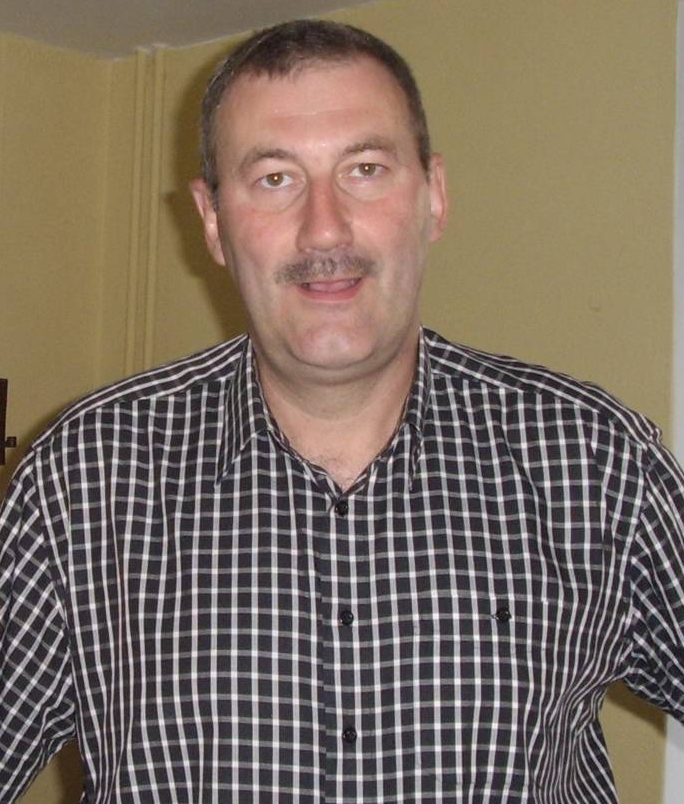
- Jerzy Binkowski in 2013

Personal information
- Nationality: Polish
- Born: 12 June 1959 (age 67) Zgorzelec, Poland

Sport
- Sport: Basketball

Jerzy Bińkowski (born 12 June 1959) is a Polish former basketball player. He competed in the men's tournament at the 1980 Summer Olympics.
