= Bernt Malion =

Swedish basketball player

Personal information
- Nationality: Swedish
- Born: 15 August 1957 (age 67); Stockholm, Sweden

Sport
- Sport: Basketball

Bernt Malion (born 15 August 1957) is a Swedish basketball player. He competed in the men's tournament at the 1980 Summer Olympics.
