= Joon-Olof Karlsson =

Swedish basketball player (born 1957)

Personal information
- Nationality: Swedish
- Born: 20 September 1957 (age 67); Nyköping, Sweden

Sport
- Sport: Basketball

Joon-Olof Karlsson (born 20 September 1957) is a Swedish basketball player. He competed in the men's tournament at the 1980 Summer Olympics.
