= Roland Rahm =

Swedish basketball player

Personal information
- Nationality: Swedish
- Born: 18 August 1955 (age 69); Stockholm, Sweden

Sport
- Sport: Basketball

Roland Rahm (born 18 August 1955) is a Swedish basketball player. He competed in the men's tournament at the 1980 Summer Olympics.
