= Sten Feldreich =

Swedish basketball player

Personal information
- Nationality: Swedish
- Born: 24 July 1955 (age 69); Stockholm, Sweden

Sport
- Sport: Basketball

Sten Feldreich (born 24 July 1955) is a Swedish basketball player. He competed in the men's tournament at the 1980 Summer Olympics. He is the son of radio presenter Bengt Feldreich.
