= List of flag bearers for Senegal at the Olympics =

Senegal at the Olympics
- IOC code: SEN
- NOC: Comité National Olympique et Sportif Sénégalais
- Medals: Gold 0 Silver 1 Bronze 0 Total 1

Summer appearances
- 1964; 1968; 1972; 1976; 1980; 1984; 1988; 1992; 1996; 2000; 2004; 2008; 2012; 2016; 2020; 2024

Winter appearances
- 1984; 1988; 1992; 1994; 1998–2002; 2006; 2010; 2014–2026

This is a list of flag bearers who have represented Senegal at the Olympics.

Flag bearers carry the national flag of their country at the opening ceremony of the Olympic Games.

| # | Event year | Season | Flag bearer | Sport |
|---|---|---|---|---|
| 1 | 1964 | Summer | | |
| 2 | 1968 | Summer | | |
| 3 | 1972 | Summer | Robert N'Diaye | Wrestling |
| 4 | 1976 | Summer | | |
| 5 | 1980 | Summer | | |
| 6 | 1984 | Winter | | |
| 7 | 1984 | Summer | Amadou Ciré Baal | Shooting |
| 8 | 1988 | Summer | Amadou Dia Ba | Athletics |
| 9 | 1992 | Winter | Lamine Guèye | Alpine skiing |
| 10 | 1992 | Summer | | |
| 11 | 1994 | Winter | Lamine Guèye | Alpine skiing |
| 12 | 1996 | Summer | Ibou Faye | Athletics |
| 13 | 2000 | Summer | Mame Tacko Diouf | Athletics |
| 14 | 2004 | Summer | Malick Fall | Swimming |
| 15 | 2006 | Winter | Leyti Seck | Alpine skiing |
| 16 | 2008 | Summer | Bineta Diedhiou | Taekwondo |
| 17 | 2010 | Winter | Leyti Seck | Alpine skiing |
| 18 | 2012 | Summer | Hortense Diédhiou | Judo |
| 19 | 2016 | Summer | Isabelle Sambou | Wrestling |
| 20 | 2020 | Summer | Jeanne Boutbien | Swimming |
| 20 | 2020 | Summer | Mbagnick Ndiaye | Judo |
| 21 | 2024 | Summer | Louis François Mendy | Athletics |
| 21 | 2024 | Summer | Combe Seck | Canoeing |

== See also ==
- Senegal at the Olympics
