= Senegal at the 1992 Summer Olympics =

- IOC code: SEN
- NOC: Comité National Olympique et Sportif Sénégalais

in Barcelona
- Competitors: 20 (18 men and 2 women) in 4 sports
- Medals: Gold 0 Silver 0 Bronze 0 Total 0

Summer Olympics appearances (overview)
- 1964; 1968; 1972; 1976; 1980; 1984; 1988; 1992; 1996; 2000; 2004; 2008; 2012; 2016; 2020; 2024

Senegal competed at the 1992 Summer Olympics in Barcelona, Spain.

== Competitors ==
The following is the list of number of competitors in the Games.

| Sport | Men | Women | Total |
|---|---|---|---|
| Athletics | 7 | 2 | 9 |
| Judo | 6 | 0 | 6 |
| Swimming | 2 | 0 | 2 |
| Wrestling | 3 | – | 3 |
| Total | 18 | 2 | 20 |

== Athletics ==
Men
Track and road events

| Athlete | Event | Heats | | Quarterfinal | | Semifinal | | Final | |
| Athlete | Event | Result | Rank | Result | Rank | Result | Rank | Result | Rank |
|---|---|---|---|---|---|---|---|---|---|
| Charles-Louis Seck | 100 metres | 10.57 | 34 | Did not advance | | | | | |
| Ibrahima Tamba | 200 metres | 21.25 | 32 Q | 21.28 | 32 | Did not advance | | | |
| Babacar Niang | 800 metres | 1:46.79 | 9 q | — | | 1:46.95 | 15 | Did not advance | |
| Amadou Dia Bâ | 400 metres hurdles | 49.47 | 22 | — | | Did not advance | | | |
| Charles-Louis Seck; Amadou M'Baye; Seydou Loum; Oumar Loum | 4 × 100 metres relay | 40.13 | 17 | — | | Did not advance | | | |

Women
Track and road events

| Athlete | Event | Heats | | Quarterfinal | | Semifinal | | Final | |
| Athlete | Event | Result | Rank | Result | Rank | Result | Rank | Result | Rank |
|---|---|---|---|---|---|---|---|---|---|
| N'Dèye Dia | 100 metres | 11.83 | 37 | Did not advance | | | | | |
| Aïssatou N'Diaye | 400 metres | 52.29 | 7 q | 52.39 | 21 | Did not advance | | | |

== Judo ==
Men

| Athlete | Event | Round of 64 | Round of 32 | Round of 16 | Quarterfinals | Semifinals | Repechage | | | | Final | |
| Athlete | Event | Round of 64 | Round of 32 | Round of 16 | Quarterfinals | Semifinals | Round 1 | Round 2 | Round 3 | Round 4 | Final | |
| Athlete | Event | Opposition Result | Opposition Result | Opposition Result | Opposition Result | Opposition Result | Opposition Result | Opposition Result | Opposition Result | Opposition Result | Opposition Result | Rank |
|---|---|---|---|---|---|---|---|---|---|---|---|---|
| Pierre Sène | 65 kg | Bye | Steffano (URU); L | Did not advance | | | | | | | | |
| Malick Seck | 71 kg | Chung (KOR); L | Did not advance | | | | Corkin (NZL); W | Sulli (ITA); L | Did not advance | | | |
| Amadou Guèye | 78 kg | Dabo (MLI); L | Did not advance | | | | | | | | | |
| Aly Attyé | 86 kg | — | López (ARG); L | Did not advance | | | | | | | | |
| Moussa Sall | 95 kg | Bye | Aguirre (ARG); L | Did not advance | | | | | | | | |
| Khalifa Diouf | +95 kg | — | Khakhaleishvili (EUN); L | Did not advance | | | — | Moreno (CUB); L | Did not advance | | | |

== Swimming ==
Men

| Athlete | Event | Heats | | Final A/B | |
| Athlete | Event | Time | Rank | Time | Rank |
|---|---|---|---|---|---|
| Mouhamed Diop | 50 metre freestyle | 24.69 | 49 | Did not advance | |
| Mouhamed Diop | 100 metre freestyle | 55.82 | 64 | Did not advance | |
| Mouhamed Diop | 200 metre individual medley | 2:23.92 | 50 | Did not advance | |
| Bruno N'Diaye | 50 metre freestyle | 25.35 | 57 | Did not advance | |
| Bruno N'Diaye | 100 metre freestyle | 56.39 | 68 | Did not advance | |

== Wrestling ==
Greco-Roman

| Athlete | Event | Group Stage | | | | | | | Final | |
| Athlete | Event | Opposition Result | Opposition Result | Opposition Result | Opposition Result | Opposition Result | Opposition Result | Rank | Opposition Result | Rank |
|---|---|---|---|---|---|---|---|---|---|---|
| Alioune Diouf | 100 kg | Komshev (BUL); L Fall | Milián (CUB); L DQ | Did not advance | | | | 7 | Did not advance | |
| Bounama Touré | 130 kg | Mesa (CUB); L Fall | Borodow (CAN); L Fall | Did not advance | | | | 7 | Did not advance | |

Freestyle

| Athlete | Event | Group Stage | | | | | | Final | |
| Athlete | Event | Opposition Result | Opposition Result | Opposition Result | Opposition Result | Opposition Result | Rank | Opposition Result | Rank |
|---|---|---|---|---|---|---|---|---|---|
| Alioune Diouf | 100 kg | Kiss (HUN); L 3–7 | Radomski (POL); L Fall | Did not advance | | | 7 | Did not advance | |
| Mor Wade | 130 kg | Thue (CAN); L Fall | Demir (TUR); L Fall | Did not advance | | | 8 | Did not advance | |
