= Senegal at the 1988 Summer Olympics =

- IOC code: SEN
- NOC: Comité National Olympique et Sportif Sénégalais

in Seoul
- Competitors: 23 in 4 sports
- Flag bearer: Amadou Dia Bâ
- Medals Ranked 36th: Gold 0 Silver 1 Bronze 0 Total 1

Summer Olympics appearances (overview)
- 1964; 1968; 1972; 1976; 1980; 1984; 1988; 1992; 1996; 2000; 2004; 2008; 2012; 2016; 2020; 2024

Senegal competed at the 1988 Summer Olympics in Seoul, South Korea. Amadou Dia Ba won the nation's first ever Olympic medal.

== Medalists ==
Medal	Name	Sport	Event	Date
Silver	Amadou Dia Bâ	Athletics	Men's 400 metres hurdles	25 September

== Competitors ==
The following is the list of number of competitors in the Games.

Sport	Men	Women	Total
Athletics	11	1	12
Judo	5	–	5
Swimming	2	0	2
Wrestling	4	–	4
Total	22	1	23

== Athletics ==
Men
Track and road events

Athlete	Event	Heat Round 1		Heat Round 2		Semifinal		Final	
Athlete	Event	Time	Rank	Time	Rank	Time	Rank	Time	Rank
Amadou M'Baye	100 metres	10.64	46 Q	10.45	30	Did not advance			
Charles-Louis Seck	100 metres	10.64	46 Q	10.42	27	Did not advance			
Ibrahima Tamba	200 metres	21.68	40 Q	21.93	38	Did not advance			
Ousmane Diarra	400 metres	46.86	27 Q	46.23	28	Did not advance			
Cheikh Tidiane Boye	800 metres	1:49.89	32 Q	1:46.62	13 Q	1:45.93	12	Did not advance	
Moussa Fall	800 metres	1:49.14	39	Did not advance					
Babacar Niang	800 metres	1:47.65	15 Q	1:45.38	3 Q	1:45.09	9	Did not advance	
Amadou Dia Bâ	400 metres hurdles	49.41	5 Q	—N/a		48.48	4 Q	47.23	2nd place, silver medalist(s)
Hamidou M'Baye	400 metres hurdles	50.58	23	—N/a		Did not advance			
Joseph Diaz; Amadou M'Baye; Babacar Pouye; Ibrahima Tamba	4 × 100 metres relay	DQ		—N/a		Did not advance			
Ousmane Diarra; Babacar Niang; Moussa Fall; Amadou Dia Bâ	4 × 400 metres relay	3:06.93	11 Q	—N/a		3:07.19	13	Did not advance	

Women
Track and road events

Athlete	Event	Heat Round 1		Heat Round 2		Semifinal		Final	
Athlete	Event	Time	Rank	Time	Rank	Time	Rank	Time	Rank
Aïssatou Tandian	400 metres	52.95	20 Q	52.33	20	Did not advance			

== Judo ==
Athlete	Event	Round of 64	Round of 32	Round of 16	Quarterfinals	Semifinals	Repechage			Final	
Athlete	Event	Round of 64	Round of 32	Round of 16	Quarterfinals	Semifinals	Round 1	Round 2	Round 3	Final	
Athlete	Event	Opposition Result	Opposition Result	Opposition Result	Opposition Result	Opposition Result	Opposition Result	Opposition Result	Opposition Result	Opposition Result	Rank
Pierre Sène	65 kg	Bye	Cooper (NZL); L Ippon	Did not advance							
Babacar Dione	71 kg	Hajtós (HUN); L Ippon	Did not advance								
Aly Attyé	78 kg	Bye	García (ARG); L Ippon	Did not advance							
Akilong Diabone	86 kg	Frick (LIE); W Ippon	Griffith (VEN); L Waza-ari	Did not advance							
Lansana Coly	+95 kg	—N/a	Saito (JPN); L Ippon	Did not advance			—N/a	Zapryanov (BUL); L Ippon	Did not advance		

== Swimming ==
Men

Athlete	Event	Heats		Final A/B	
Athlete	Event	Time	Rank	Time	Rank
Mouhamed Diop	50 metre freestyle	DQ		Did not advance	
Mouhamed Diop	100 metre freestyle	54.93	54	Did not advance	
Mouhamed Diop	200 metre individual medley	2:20.74	52	Did not advance	
Bruno N'Diaye	50 metre freestyle	25.63	56	Did not advance	
Bruno N'Diaye	100 metre backstroke	1:05.06	46	Did not advance	
Bruno N'Diaye	200 metre individual medley	2:29.18	54	Did not advance	

== Wrestling ==
Greco-Roman

Athlete	Event	Group Stage								Final	
Athlete	Event	Opposition Result	Opposition Result	Opposition Result	Opposition Result	Opposition Result	Opposition Result	Opposition Result	Rank	Opposition Result	Rank
Oumar N'Gom	82 kg	Bye	Gössner (FRG); L Fall	Did not advance				—N/a	8	Did not advance	
Tapha Guèye	90 kg	Popov (URS); L Fall	Youmbi (CMR); L 5–11	Did not advance				—N/a	8	Did not advance	
Ambroise Sarr	100 kg	Georgiev (BUL); L Fall	Himmel (FRG); L Fall	Did not advance				—N/a	8	Did not advance	

Freestyle

Athlete	Event	Group Stage								Final	
Athlete	Event	Opposition Result	Opposition Result	Opposition Result	Opposition Result	Opposition Result	Opposition Result	Opposition Result	Rank	Opposition Result	Rank
Djiby Diouf	74 kg	Anwar (PAK); L Fall	Diallo (GUI); L Passivity	Did not advance					14	Did not advance	
Oumar N'Gom	82 kg	Sükhbat (MGL); L 0–15	Nikolovski (YUG); L 1–6	Did not advance				—N/a	12	Did not advance	
Tapha Guèye	90 kg	English (GBR); L Fall	Taj (AFG); L Fall	Did not advance				—N/a	12	Did not advance	
