= Senegal at the 2000 Summer Olympics =

- IOC code: SEN
- NOC: Senegalese National Olympic and Sports Committee

in Sydney
- Competitors: 26 in 6 sports
- Flag bearer: Mame Tacko Diouf
- Medals: Gold 0 Silver 0 Bronze 0 Total 0

Summer Olympics appearances (overview)
- 1964; 1968; 1972; 1976; 1980; 1984; 1988; 1992; 1996; 2000; 2004; 2008; 2012; 2016; 2020; 2024

Senegal was represented at the 2000 Summer Olympics in Sydney, New South Wales, Australia by the Senegalese National Olympic and Sports Committee.

In total, 26 athletes including seven men and 19 women represented Senegal in six different sports including athletics, basketball, boxing, judo, swimming and wrestling.

== Competitors ==
In total, 26 athletes represented Senegal at the 2000 Summer Olympics in Sydney, New South Wales, Australia across six different sports.

Sport	Men	Women	Total
Athletics	4	5	9
Basketball	0	12	12
Boxing	1	–	1
Judo	0	1	1
Swimming	1	1	2
Wrestling	1	—	1
Total	7	19	26

== Athletics ==
In total, nine Senegalese athletes participated in the athletics events – Oumar Loum in the men's 200 m and the men's 4 × 400 m relay, Ibou Faye in the men's 400 m hurdles and the men's 4 × 400 m relay, Ousmane Niang and Youssoupha Sarr in the men's 4 × 400 m relay, Aminata Diouf in the women's 100 m and the women's 4 x 400 m relay, Aïda Diop in the women's 200 m and the women's 4 x 400 m relay, Amy Mbacké Thiam in the women's 400 m and the women's 4 x 400 m relay, Mame Tacko Diouf in the women's 400 m hurdles and the women's 4 x 400 m relay and Kène Ndoye in the women's triple jump.

Men
Track and road events

Athletes	Events	Heat Round 1		Heat Round 2		Semifinal		Final	
Athletes	Events	Time	Rank	Time	Rank	Time	Rank	Time	Rank
Oumar Loum	200 metres	20.87	25 Q	20.60	20	did not advance			
Ibou Faye	400 metres hurdles	50.09	25	—N/a		did not advance			
Oumar Loum; Ousmane Niang; Youssoupha Sarr; Ibou Faye	4 × 400 metres relay	3:02.67	4 q	—N/a		3:02.94	12	did not advance	

Women
Track and road events

Athletes	Events	Heat Round 1		Heat Round 2		Semifinal		Final	
Athletes	Events	Time	Rank	Time	Rank	Time	Rank	Time	Rank
Aminata Diouf	100 metres	11.65	45	did not advance					
Aïda Diop	200 metres	23.46	35	did not advance					
Amy Mbacké Thiam	400 metres	51.79	12 Q	51.64	15 Q	51.60	12	did not advance	
Mame Tacko Diouf	400 metres hurdles	58.65	27	—N/a		did not advance			
Aïda Diop; Mame Tacko Diouf; Aminata Diouf; Amy Mbacké Thiam	4 × 400 metres relay	3:28.02	13	—N/a				did not advance	

Field events

Athlete	Event	Qualification		Final	
Athlete	Event	Distance	Position	Distance	Position
Kène Ndoye	Triple jump	13.94	14	did not advance	

== Basketball ==
In total, 12 Senegalese athletes participated in the basketball events – Coumba Cissé, Adama Diakhaté, Khady Diop, Bineta Diouf, Mbarika Fall, Awa Guèye, Marieme Lo, Mame Maty Mbengue, Astou N'Diaye, Fatime N'Diaye, Yacine Khady Ngom and Ndialou Paye in the women's tournament.

Group play

Team	W	L	PF	PA	PD	Pts	Tie
Australia	5	0	394	274	+120	10	
France	4	1	338	287	+51	9	
Brazil	2	3	358	353	+5	7	1.12
Slovakia	2	3	294	282	+12	7	0.97
Canada	2	3	313	317	−4	7	0.91
Senegal	0	5	199	383	−184	5	

16 September
14:30

France	75–39	Senegal

The Dome, Sydney

18 September
9:30

Canada	62–41	Senegal

The Dome, Sydney

20 September
14:30

Brazil	82–48	Senegal

The Dome, Sydney

22 September
19:30

Australia	96–39	Senegal

The Dome, Sydney

24 September
9:30

Slovakia	68–32	Senegal

The Dome, Sydney

11th place match

26 September
9:30

11th place

New Zealand	72–69	Senegal

Sydney Superdome, Sydney

== Boxing ==
In total, one Senegalese athletes participated in the boxing events – Djibril Fall in the light heavyweight category.

Athlete	Event	Round of 32	Round of 16	Quarterfinals	Semifinals	Final	
Athlete	Event	Opposition Result	Opposition Result	Opposition Result	Opposition Result	Opposition Result	Rank
Djibril Fall	Light heavyweight	Lebzyak (RUS); L RSC–R3	did not advance				

== Judo ==
In total, one Senegalese athlete participated in the judo events – Adja Marieme Diop in the women's +78 kg category.

Athlete	Event	Round of 32	Round of 16	Quarterfinals	Semifinals	Repechage 1	Repechage 2	Repechage 3	Final / BM	
Athlete	Event	Opposition Result	Opposition Result	Opposition Result	Opposition Result	Opposition Result	Opposition Result	Opposition Result	Opposition Result	Rank
Adja Marieme Diop	+78 kg	Bryant (GBR); L	did not advance							

== Swimming ==
In total, two Senegalese athletes participated in the swimming events – Malick Fall in the men's 100 m breaststroke and Zeïna Sahéli in the women's 100 m freestyle.

Men

Athlete	Event	Heat		Semifinal		Final	
Athlete	Event	Time	Rank	Time	Rank	Time	Rank
Malick Fall	100 m breaststroke	1:08.60	62	did not advance			

Women

Athlete	Event	Heat		Semifinal		Final	
Athlete	Event	Time	Rank	Time	Rank	Time	Rank
Zeïna Sahéli	100 m freestyle	1:07.37	51	did not advance			

== Wrestling ==
In total, one Senegalese athletes participated in the wrestling events – Alioune Diouf in the freestyle –85 kg category.

Athlete	Event	Elimination Pool				Quarterfinal	Semifinal	Final / BM	
Athlete	Event	Opposition Result	Opposition Result	Opposition Result	Rank	Opposition Result	Opposition Result	Opposition Result	Rank
Alioune Diouf	−85 kg	Burton (USA); L 0–4	Martinetti (SUI); W 10–7	—N/a	2	did not advance			15
