= Senegal at the 2004 Summer Olympics =

- IOC code: SEN
- NOC: Comité National Olympique et Sportif Sénégalais

in Athens
- Competitors: 16 in 6 sports
- Flag bearer: Malick Fall
- Medals: Gold 0 Silver 0 Bronze 0 Total 0

Summer Olympics appearances (overview)
- 1964; 1968; 1972; 1976; 1980; 1984; 1988; 1992; 1996; 2000; 2004; 2008; 2012; 2016; 2020; 2024

Senegal competed at the 2004 Summer Olympics in Athens, Greece, from 13 to 29 August 2004. This was the nation's eleventh appearance at the Olympics.

The Senegalese National Olympic and Sports Committee (French: Comité National Olympique et Sportif Sénégalais) sent a total of sixteen athletes to the Games, six men and ten women, to take part in six different sports. For the second consecutive time in the nation's Olympic history, Senegal was represented by more female than male athletes. Five Senegalese athletes had previously competed in Sydney, including hurdler Mame Tacko Diouf and breaststroke swimmer Malick Fall, who carried the nation's flag in the opening ceremony. There was only a single competitor in judo, table tennis, and wrestling.

Senegal, however, failed to win its first Olympic medal since the 1988 Summer Olympics in Seoul, where Amadou Dia Bâ won silver for the track hurdles.

== Athletics ==
Senegalese athletes have so far achieved qualifying standards in the following athletics events (up to a maximum of 3 athletes in each event at the 'A' Standard, and 1 at the 'B' Standard).

Key

- Note–Ranks given for track events are within the athlete's heat only
- Q = Qualified for the next round
- q = Qualified for the next round as a fastest loser or, in field events, by position without achieving the qualifying target
- NR = National record
- N/A = Round not applicable for the event
- Bye = Athlete not required to compete in round

Men
Track & road events

Athlete	Event	Heat		Quarterfinal		Semifinal		Final	
Athlete	Event	Result	Rank	Result	Rank	Result	Rank	Result	Rank
Oumar Loum	200 m	20.97	6	Did not advance					
Abdoulaye Wagne	800 m	1:47.95	5	—N/a		Did not advance			

Field events

Athlete	Event	Qualification		Final	
Athlete	Event	Distance	Position	Distance	Position
Ndiss Kaba Badji	Long jump	7.74	27	Did not advance	

Women
Track & road events

Athlete	Event	Heat		Semifinal		Final	
Athlete	Event	Result	Rank	Result	Rank	Result	Rank
Mame Tacko Diouf	400 m hurdles	57.25	6	Did not advance			
Fatou Bintou Fall	400 m	51.87	4 q	51.21	4	Did not advance	
Amy Mbacké Thiam	400 m	52.44	5	Did not advance			
Aïda Diop; Aminata Diouf; Mame Tacko Diouf; Fatou Bintou Fall	4 × 400 m relay	3:35.18	8	—N/a		Did not advance	

Field events

Athlete	Event	Qualification		Final	
Athlete	Event	Distance	Position	Distance	Position
Kéné Ndoye	Long jump	6.45	22	Did not advance	
Kéné Ndoye	Triple jump	14.79	4 Q	14.18	14

== Fencing ==
Two Senegalese fencers were selected to compete for the following events through a tripartite invitation.

Women

Athlete	Event	Round of 64	Round of 32	Round of 16	Quarterfinal	Semifinal	Final / BM	
Athlete	Event	Opposition Score	Opposition Score	Opposition Score	Opposition Score	Opposition Score	Opposition Score	Rank
Aminata Ndong	Individual épée	Sidiropoulou (GRE); L WO	Did not advance					
Nafi Toure	Individual sabre	—N/a	Gheorghițoaia (ROM); L 6–15	Did not advance				

== Judo ==
Senegal has qualified a single judoka.

Athlete	Event	Round of 32	Round of 16	Quarterfinals	Semifinals	Repechage 1	Repechage 2	Repechage 3	Final / BM	
Athlete	Event	Opposition Result	Opposition Result	Opposition Result	Opposition Result	Opposition Result	Opposition Result	Opposition Result	Opposition Result	Rank
Hortense Diédhiou	Women's −52 kg	Bye	Yokosawa (JPN); L 0100–0101	Did not advance		Ri S-S (PRK); L 0000–0020	Did not advance			

== Swimming ==
Senegalese swimmers earned qualifying standards in the following events (up to a maximum of 2 swimmers in each event at the A-standard time, and 1 at the B-standard time):

Men

Athlete	Event	Heat		Semifinal		Final	
Athlete	Event	Time	Rank	Time	Rank	Time	Rank
Malick Fall	100 m breaststroke	1:04.50	40	Did not advance			
Malick Fall	200 m breaststroke	2:22.31	43	Did not advance			
Malick Fall	200 m individual medley	2:12.13	47	Did not advance			

Women

Athlete	Event	Heat		Semifinal		Final	
Athlete	Event	Time	Rank	Time	Rank	Time	Rank
Khadija Ciss	200 m freestyle	2:09.04	40	Did not advance			
Khadija Ciss	800 m freestyle	9:20.06	29	—N/a		Did not advance	

== Table tennis ==
Senegal has selected a single tennis player through a tripartite invitation.

Athlete	Event	Round 1	Round 2	Round 3	Round 4	Quarterfinals	Semifinals	Final / BM	
Athlete	Event	Opposition Result	Opposition Result	Opposition Result	Opposition Result	Opposition Result	Opposition Result	Opposition Result	Rank
Mohamed Guèye	Men's singles	Wosik (GER); L 0–4	Did not advance						

== Wrestling ==
Key

- VT – Victory by Fall.
- PP – Decision by Points – the loser with technical points.
- PO – Decision by Points – the loser without technical points.

Men's freestyle

Athlete	Event	Elimination Pool				Quarterfinal	Semifinal	Final / BM	
Athlete	Event	Opposition Result	Opposition Result	Opposition Result	Rank	Opposition Result	Opposition Result	Opposition Result	Rank
Matar Sène	−84 kg	Sazhidov (RUS); L 0–4 ^{ST}	Aliev (TJK); L 1–3 ^{PP}	Ghiţă (ROM); L 1–3 ^{PP}	4	Did not advance			17

== See also ==
- Senegal at the 2004 Summer Paralympics
