= Oumar Dia (disambiguation) =

== People ==
- Omar Dia, a former Senegalese basketball player who competed for Senegal at the 1980 Summer Olympics
- Oumar Dia, an African refugee who was murdered in Denver by white supremacists in 1997
