= Swimming at the 1992 Summer Olympics – Men's 200 metre individual medley =

Men's 200 metre individual medley at the Games of the XXV Olympiad
- Venue: Piscines Bernat Picornell
- Date: 31 July 1992 (heats & finals)
- Competitors: 60 from 43 nations
- Winning time: 2:00.76

Medalists
1st place, gold medalist(s)		Tamás Darnyi	Hungary
2nd place, silver medalist(s)		Greg Burgess	United States
3rd place, bronze medalist(s)		Attila Czene	Hungary

The men's 200 metre individual medley event at the 1992 Summer Olympics took place on 31 July at the Piscines Bernat Picornell in Barcelona, Spain.

== Records ==
Prior to this competition, the existing world and Olympic records were as follows.

World record	Tamás Darnyi (HUN)	1:59.36	Perth, Australia	13 January 1991
Olympic record	Tamás Darnyi (HUN)	2:00.17	Seoul, South Korea	25 September 1988

== Results ==
=== Heats ===
Rule: The eight fastest swimmers advance to final A (Q), while the next eight to final B (q).

Rank	Heat	Lane	Name	Nationality	Time	Notes
1	7	5	Jani Sievinen	Finland	2:01.18	Q, NR
2	8	4	Tamás Darnyi	Hungary	2:01.29	Q
3	8	5	Greg Burgess	United States	2:01.35	Q
4	7	4	Ron Karnaugh	United States	2:01.64	Q
5	6	5	Attila Czene	Hungary	2:02.05	Q
6	7	3	Christian Geßner	Germany	2:02.43	Q
7	6	3	Gary Anderson	Canada	2:02.63	Q
8	8	7	Matthew Dunn	Australia	2:02.75	Q, OC
9	6	4	Martín López-Zubero	Spain	2:03.07	q
10	8	2	Tatsuya Kinugasa	Japan	2:03.32	q
11	6	6	Luca Sacchi	Italy	2:03.54	q, WD
12	8	6	Darren Ward	Canada	2:03.71	q
13	7	6	Frédéric Lefevre	France	2:03.82	q
14	7	8	Serghei Mariniuc	Unified Team	2:04.23	q
15	8	3	Lars Sørensen	Denmark	2:04.65	q
16	6	2	Takahiro Fujimoto	Japan	2:04.89	q
17	7	7	Manuel Guzmán	Puerto Rico	2:04.95	q
18	8	8	John Davey	Great Britain	2:05.07	
19	5	2	Aleksandr Savitsky	Unified Team	2:05.09	
20	4	5	Marcin Maliński	Poland	2:05.32	
21	5	4	Petteri Lehtinen	Finland	2:05.65	
22	6	7	Marcel Wouda	Netherlands	2:05.95	
23	6	1	Joaquín Fernández	Spain	2:06.09	
24	5	5	Stefaan Maene	Belgium	2:06.16	
25	4	4	Marian Satnoianu	Romania	2:06.45	
26	4	2	Denislav Kalchev	Bulgaria	2:06.51	
27	1	8	Clifford Lyne	South Africa	2:06.62	AF
28	5	7	Simon Percy	New Zealand	2:06.76	
29	3	6	Igor Łuczak	Poland	2:07.08	
30	4	6	José Carlos Souza	Brazil	2:07.09	
31	4	7	Desmond Koh	Singapore	2:07.16	
32	7	2	Josef Hladký	Germany	2:07.18	
33	3	4	Diogo Madeira	Portugal	2:07.38	
34	5	6	Gary O'Toole	Ireland	2:07.67	
35	5	3	Renato Ramalho	Brazil	2:07.78	
36	3	5	Andy Rolley	Great Britain	2:09.22	
37	3	7	Arthur Li Kai Yien	Hong Kong	2:09.32	
38	4	3	Joseph Eric Buhain	Philippines	2:09.33	
39	2	4	Ratapong Sirisanont	Thailand	2:11.02	
40	3	2	Gary Tan	Singapore	2:11.14	
41	3	1	Ricardo Torres	Panama	2:12.01	
42	2	2	Duncan Todd	Hong Kong	2:12.29	
43	2	6	Christophe Verdino	Monaco	2:12.46	
44	4	1	Sultan Al-Otaibi	Kuwait	2:13.68	
45	2	5	Alejandro Alvizuri	Peru	2:15.10	
46	2	7	Plutarco Castellanos	Honduras	2:15.50	
47	2	1	Émile Lahoud	Lebanon	2:22.08	
48	1	4	Carl Probert	Fiji	2:22.09	
49	1	3	Mohamed Bin Abid	United Arab Emirates	2:22.95	
50	1	1	Mouhamed Diop	Senegal	2:23.92	
51	1	6	Kenny Roberts	Seychelles	2:30.35	
52	1	2	Jean-Paul Adam	Seychelles	2:35.35	
	2	3	Roberto Bonilla	Guatemala	DSQ	
	5	1	Rodrigo González	Mexico	DSQ	
	7	1	Jan Bidrman	Sweden	DSQ	
	8	1	Martin Roberts	Australia	DSQ	
	1	7	Bruno N'Diaye	Senegal	DNS	
	1	5	Ziyad Kashmiri	Saudi Arabia	DNS	
	3	3	Eran Groumi	Israel	DNS	
	6	8	Stefano Battistelli	Italy	DNS	

=== Finals ===
==== Final B ====
Rank	Lane	Name	Nationality	Time	Notes
9	4	Martín López-Zubero	Spain	2:03.34	
10	2	Serghei Mariniuc	Unified Team	2:03.72	
11	7	Lars Sørensen	Denmark	2:03.81	
12	6	Frédéric Lefevre	France	2:04.05	
13	5	Tatsuya Kinugasa	Japan	2:04.29	
14	3	Darren Ward	Canada	2:05.09	
15	1	Takahiro Fujimoto	Japan	2:07.74	
	8	Manuel Guzmán	Puerto Rico	DNS	

==== Final A ====
Rank	Lane	Name	Nationality	Time	Notes
1st place, gold medalist(s)	5	Tamás Darnyi	Hungary	2:00.76	
2nd place, silver medalist(s)	3	Greg Burgess	United States	2:00.97	
3rd place, bronze medalist(s)	2	Attila Czene	Hungary	2:01.00	
4	4	Jani Sievinen	Finland	2:01.28	
5	7	Christian Geßner	Germany	2:01.97	
6	6	Ron Karnaugh	United States	2:02.18	
7	8	Matthew Dunn	Australia	2:02.79	
8	1	Gary Anderson	Canada	2:02.79	
