= Mouhamed Diop =

Mouhamed Diop may refer to:

- Mouhamed Diop (swimmer)
- Mouhamed Diop (footballer)

== See also ==
- Mohamed Diop, Senegalese basketball player
