= Senegal at the 2012 Summer Paralympics =

- IPC code: SEN
- NPC: Comité National Provisoire Handisport et Paralympique Sénégalais

in London
- Competitors: 1 in 1 sport
- Medals: Gold 0 Silver 0 Bronze 0 Total 0

Summer Paralympics appearances (overview)
- 2004; 2008; 2012; 2016; 2020; 2024

Senegal competed at the 2012 Summer Paralympics in London, United Kingdom from August 29 to September 9, 2012.

== Athletics ==
Men's field

Athlete	Event	Distance	Points	Rank
Mor Ndiaye	Javelin throw F57-58	38.11	757	12

== See also ==
- Senegal at the Paralympics
- Senegal at the 2012 Summer Olympics
