= List of killings by law enforcement officers in the United States, February 2012 =

This is a list of people reported killed by non-military law enforcement officers in the United States in February 2012, whether in the line of duty or not, and regardless of reason or method. The listing documents the occurrence of a death, making no implications regarding wrongdoing or justification on the part of the person killed or officer involved. Killings are arranged by date of the incident that caused death. Different death dates, if known, are noted in the description. The table below lists 33 people.

== February 2012 ==
| Date | Name (Age) of Deceased | City, State | Description |
|---|---|---|---|
| 2012‑02‑29 | Gilmore, Anthony Paul, Jr. (23) | San Bernardino, California | Gilmore fled during a traffic stop when asked if he had a weapon. A struggle with an officer ensued, and the officer shot and killed Gilmore after he reached for a gun that had fallen to the ground. |
| 2012-02-29 | Baker, Michael Joseph (32) | Claxton, Tennessee | The incident began when Baker and Richardson allegedly drove off without paying for gas. A high-speed chase ensued, during which police say Richardson shot at officers from the stolen truck they were driving. The truck crashed and the shootout continued, ending when two officers shot and killed both suspects, who were on an array of drugs at the time. |
| 2012-02-29 | Shanna Lee Richardson (25) | Claxton, Tennessee | The incident began when Baker and Richardson allegedly drove off without paying for gas. A high-speed chase ensued, during which police say Richardson shot at officers from the stolen truck they were driving. The truck crashed and the shootout continued, ending when two officers shot and killed both suspects, who were on an array of drugs at the time. |
| 2012-02-29 | unnamed male | Jonesboro, Georgia | Officers responded to report of an armed robbery of a restaurant and located the suspect in a neighborhood. The suspect shot at police, fled on foot, carjacked a car with a baby in it, crashed the car into a home, then fled on foot into the home of his sister. There he remained held up for a couple of hours with police surrounding. When he began shooting at police, they returned fire, killing him. |
| 2012-02-24 | unnamed male | Los Angeles, California | |
| 2012-02-24 | Runge, Chad (20) | Cedar Park, Texas | Police responded to a report of an armed robbery. When officers arrived a witness identified the fleeing suspect. During the foot chase an armed Runge confronted an officer and was fatally shot. |
| 2012-02-24 | Henderson, Travis (52) | Dallas, Texas | Police responded to report of suicidal man. Police located Henderson in a vehicle and heard a gunshot. A SWAT team responded and negotiators work the situation for three hours. Henderson exited his vehicle and pointed his gun at officers without firing it. He was shot to death by an officer. |
| 2012-02-23 | Barnum, Jeremiah (38) | Englewood, Colorado | Barnum, who was previously involved in the murder of Oumar Dia, confronted an officer in a store parking lot. Officers report seeing Barnum reach for a gun in his waistband. As Barnum backed his vehicle away, he nearly hit an officer. Officers fired six times. |
| 2012-02-21 | unnamed male | Paramount, California | Man was shot twice after attempting to take an officer's gun. |
| 2012-02-19 | Fleming, Harold (40) | St. Petersburg, Florida | Fleming, a quadriplegic, was crossing a street in a wheelchair around 4 a.m. when he was struck by Officer Mehmedin Karic's speeding cruiser. Fleming was killed by the accident, and Karic was cited for careless driving (three months later). On August 2, 2012, Karic was fired for violating traffic laws and driving carelessly. |
| 2012-02-19 | Luis Enrique Nuñez (48) | Hialeah, Florida | |
| 2012-02-18 | Bond, Danny James (38) | Riverside, California | Two officers tried to stop Bond on his bicycle to arrest him on outstanding warrants, and he fled on foot. Two officers shot him to death after he allegedly pulled out a pistol. |
| 2012-02-18 | Kelley, David (54) | Mesa, Arizona | Police were called to a home where a man reportedly armed with a knife was holding a woman hostage. The man refused to drop his knife or release the woman, and officers shot him to death. |
| 2012-02-17 | unnamed male | Superior, Wisconsin | |
| 2012-02-16 | unnamed male | Long Beach, California | One federal agent shot and injured another agent over a disciplinary matter. A third agent shot and killed the first agent to prevent him from shooting the injured agent again. |
| 2012-02-15 | Richard Louis (62) | Lihue, Hawaii | |
| 2012-02-15 | John Corcoran (34) | Waukegan, Illinois | Officers responded to report of a man with a gun at a hotel. When the officers arrived, the man pulled out a handgun. An officer fired one shot, killing him. |
| 2012-02-14 | McBride, Michael (52) | New York, New York | Officers were pursuing McBride as a murder suspect. McBride fired at officer who returned fire, killing McBride. 19 shots were exchanged in a crowded subway. |
| 2012-02-14 | Loxas, John | Scottsdale, Arizona | Loxas was allegedly holding his baby grandson when an argument with neighbors led to him brandishing a handgun at them. They called the police. Officer James Peters shot Loxas in the head while he was still holding the baby. He was not holding a gun at the time. |
| 2012-02-13 | Banks, William (26) | Pleasant Grove, Texas | Police were searching for a man who robbed a couple at gunpoint, then fled in a vehicle. Police gave chase to a matching vehicle. Banks fled on foot. When police caught up to Banks, he turned and confronted them with a handgun. Several officers fired multiple times. Banks died at a hospital. |
| 2012-02-11 | unnamed male | Chicago, Illinois | An off-duty police officer responded to a crashing sound near his home. The officer, wearing a police uniform shirt, drove to the source of the sound and found a person attempting to force open a garage door by ramming it with a van. The officer parked behind the van, identified himself as an officer and attempted to arrest the driver and passenger. The driver rammed the officer's car and knocked the officer to the ground. As the driver aimed the van at the officer, he shot the driver. The passenger escaped on foot. The driver died of gunshot injuries at the hospital. |
| 2012-02-11 | unnamed male | Decatur, Georgia | Police responded to report of a carjacking. Officers followed the suspect in the stolen vehicle, then on foot into a wooded area. A shootout ensued. A gun was recovered at the scene. The suspect died of gunshot wounds in a local hospital. |
| 2012-02-09 | Butcher, Richard | Cannon County, Tennessee | . |
| 2012-02-09 | Cook, Patricia (54) | Culpeper, Virginia | Officer Daniel Harmon-Wright shot and killed Cook, who was unarmed, in her vehicle while she tried to drive away. The officer was summoned by a call about a suspicious person in the parking lot of a Catholic middle school. Harmon-Wright was fired in June 2012 and on January 29, 2013, was convicted on three charges, including involuntary manslaughter. He was sentenced to three years in prison. |
| 2012-02-08 | Mulqueen, Tim | Long Island City, New York | Mulqueen entered the city courthouse and opened fired towards officers near the entrance. One officer was injured. Officers returned fire, fatally wounding Mulqueen. |
| 2012-02-08 | Henninger, Joseph M. | Poulsbo, Washington | Shot by officers called to the scene for reports of a handgun being fired inside of a Les Schwab store. |
| 2012-02-08 | Sanchez, Albert (29) | Fresno, California | Fresno Police received reports of a man with a knife running up to cars on the street and banging on them. Police arrived near Belmont and Abby and one officer tried to approach the man. As the man holding the knife ran toward the officer, the officer fired multiple shots. The man, later identified as Albert Sanchez, died at the scene. |
| 2012-02-07 | Loggins, Manuel Jr | Los Angeles, California | Loggins crashed his vehicle into the gate of a high school. He exited the vehicle and left his two daughters behind in the vehicle. An officer heard the crash and arrived at the scene and checked on the girls in the vehicle. As Loggins returned to the vehicle he ignored the officer's commands to show his hands and stay clear of the vehicle. When Loggins shifted into reverse the office fired three times. Loggins died of his wounds in a hospital. |
| 2012-02-07 | unnamed male (54) | Phoenix, Arizona | Shot numerous times by an officer after allegedly pointing a handgun at two officers. The 54-year-old man was suspected of holding his estranged wife and her boyfriend hostage. |
| 2012-02-02 | Graham, Ramarley (18) | Bronx, New York | Graham was shot once in upper left chest after being chased into his home by plainclothes officers. The unarmed Graham was running into the bathroom to flush marijuana down the toilet. The NYPD officer who shot Graham, Richard Haste, was charged with manslaughter in June 2012 and was released on $50,000 bail. The charge against Haste was later dropped. Haste claimed that he saw a weapon on Graham's body, and that Graham ignored demands to put his hands in the air. |
| 2012-02-01 | Haskell, Danny (39) | Lake Havasu City, Arizona | Police responded to report of a potentially suicidal man who reportedly threatened to also kill five children who were with him. Arriving officers heard screams just prior to Haskel exiting the residence with a handgun in his hand. Officers shot at Haskell who returned fire. Haskell was struck at least twice and died at the scene. |
| 2012-02-01 | Watts, Stephon (15) | Calumet City, Illinois | Shot by two officers in his home after his parents called police to help subdue Stephon, their autistic son. Police had visited the home under similar circumstances 10 times in the previous two years. Watts struck an officer with a kitchen knife before receiving multiple shots to the upper torso. |
| 2012-02-01 | Baires, Jason (23) | Las Vegas, Nevada | Killed in a shootout with police. Baires was wanted for the murder of his mother's boyfriend. |

== Known Erroneous Reports ==
This section includes deaths which were initially reported as police killings but later turned out not to be.

| Date | Name | State (City) | Initial Reports | Later Reports |
|---|---|---|---|---|
| 2012-02-07 | Jones, Cory (27) | Richardson, Texas | The suspect tried to board a bus and argued with the driver. An officer responded to the disturbance and chased the suspect on foot. The suspect shot and injured the officer and two bystanders, one of whom later died. Another officer chased the suspect into a building and fatally shot him. | Ballistics evidence determined that an officer injured one bystander and that Jones killed the other bystander and himself |

== See also ==
- Death in custody § United States
- Henry A. Wallace Police Crime Public Database
- List of cases of police brutality
- List of countries with annual rates and counts for killings by law enforcement officers
- List of law enforcement officers killed in the line of duty in the United States
- List of law enforcement officers convicted for an on-duty killing in the United States
- List of shootings by US immigration agents
- List of police reforms related to the George Floyd protests
- List of unarmed African Americans killed by law enforcement officers in the United States
- Lists of killings by law enforcement officers
- Police brutality in the United States
- Police misconduct § United States
- Police riot § United States
- Police use of deadly force in the United States
