= Senegal at the 2024 Summer Paralympics =

- IPC code: SEN
- NPC: Comité National Provisoire Handisport et Paralympique Sénégalais

in Paris, France August 28, 2024 – September 8, 2024
- Competitors: 4 in 4 sports
- Flag bearer: Youssoupha Diouf
- Medals: Gold 0 Silver 0 Bronze 0 Total 0

Summer Paralympics appearances (overview)
- 2004; 2008; 2012; 2016; 2020; 2024

Senegal competed at the 2024 Summer Paralympics in Paris, France, from 28 August to 8 September 2024. It was the nation's sixth consecutive appearance at the Summer Paralympics, since the nation's participate at 2004.

== Competitors ==
The following is the list of number of competitors in the Games.

Sport	Men	Women	Total
Archery	1	0	1
Athletics	0	1	1
Paracanoeing	1	0	1
Taekwondo	1	0	1
Total	4	0	4

== Archery ==
Senegal entered one male archers into the games.

Athlete	Event	Ranking Round		Round of 32	Round of 16	Quarterfinals	Semifinals	Finals	
Athlete	Event	Score	Seed	Opposition Score	Opposition Score	Opposition Score	Opposition Score	Opposition Score	Rank
Aliou Drame	Men's individual compound	672	28	Kumar (IND); L (131–136)	Did not advance				

== Athletics ==
Athlete	Event	Final	
Athlete	Event	Result	Rank
Youssoupha Diouf	Men's javelin throw F57	47.39	5

== Paracanoeing ==
Senegal earned quota places for the following events through the 2024 ICF Canoe Sprint World Championships in Szeged, Hungary.

Athlete	Event	Heats		Semifinal		Final	
Athlete	Event	Time	Rank	Time	Rank	Time	Rank
Edmond Sanka	Men's KL3	42.77	3 SF	41.94	3 FA	40.80	5

== Taekwondo ==
Senegal entered one athletes to compete at the Paralympics competition. Idrissa Keita qualified for Paris 2024, following the triumph of his gold medal results in men's above 80 kg classes, at the 2024 African Qualification Tournament in Dakar.

Athlete	Event	Round of 16	Quarterfinals	Semifinals	Repechage 1	Repechage 2	Final / BM	
Athlete	Event	Opposition Result	Opposition Result	Opposition Result	Opposition Result	Opposition Result	Opposition Result	Rank
Idrissa Keita	Men's +80 kg	Saraç (TUR); W 6-4	Bush (GBR); L 0-16	—		Liu (CHN); W 13-11	Medell (USA); L 1-13	5

== See also ==
- Senegal at the 2024 Summer Olympics
- Senegal at the Paralympics
