= Denver shooting =

Denver shooting may refer to:

- Father's Day bank massacre, 1991
- Murder of Oumar Dia, 1997
- 2021 Denver and Lakewood shootings

== See also ==
- List of shootings in Colorado
