= Senegal at the 2008 Summer Olympics =

- IOC code: SEN
- NOC: Comité National Olympique et Sportif Sénégalais

in Beijing
- Competitors: 15 in 6 sports
- Flag bearer: Bineta Diedhiou
- Medals: Gold 0 Silver 0 Bronze 0 Total 0

Summer Olympics appearances (overview)
- 1964; 1968; 1972; 1976; 1980; 1984; 1988; 1992; 1996; 2000; 2004; 2008; 2012; 2016; 2020; 2024

Senegal competed in the 2008 Summer Olympics held in Beijing, People's Republic of China from August 8 to August 24, 2008.

== Athletics ==
Key

- Note–Ranks given for track events are within the athlete's heat only
- Q = Qualified for the next round
- q = Qualified for the next round as a fastest loser or, in field events, by position without achieving the qualifying target
- NR = National record
- N/A = Round not applicable for the event
- Bye = Athlete not required to compete in round

Men
Track & road events

| Athlete | Event | Heat | | Semifinal | | Final | |
| Athlete | Event | Result | Rank | Result | Rank | Result | Rank |
|---|---|---|---|---|---|---|---|
| Abdoulaye Wagne | 800 m | 1:47.50 | 5 | Did not advance | | | |

Field events

| Athlete | Event | Qualification | | Final | |
| Athlete | Event | Distance | Position | Distance | Position |
|---|---|---|---|---|---|
| Ndiss Kaba Badji | Long jump | 8.07 | 7 Q | 8.16 | 6 |
| Ndiss Kaba Badji | Triple jump | NM | — | Did not advance | |

== Canoeing ==
=== Sprint ===
| Athlete | Event | Heats | | Semifinals | | Final | |
| Athlete | Event | Time | Rank | Time | Rank | Time | Rank |
|---|---|---|---|---|---|---|---|
| Assane Dame Fall | Men's K-1 500 m | 1:52.215 | 5 QS | 2:04.633 | 9 | Did not advance | |
| Assane Dame Fall | Men's K-1 1000 m | 4:07.061 | 9 | Did not advance | | | |
| Khathia Ba | Women's K-1 500 m | 2:17.740 | 9 | Did not advance | | | |

Qualification Legend: QS = Qualify to semi-final; QF = Qualify directly to final

== Fencing ==
Men

| Athlete | Event | Round of 64 | Round of 32 | Round of 16 | Quarterfinal | Semifinal | Final / BM | |
| Athlete | Event | Opposition Score | Opposition Score | Opposition Score | Opposition Score | Opposition Score | Opposition Score | Rank |
|---|---|---|---|---|---|---|---|---|
| Abdoulaye Thiam | Individual sabre | Rogers (USA); L 10–15 | Did not advance | | | | | |
| Mamadou Keita | Individual sabre | Ogawa (JPN); W 15–14 | Dumitrescu (ROU); L 7–15 | Did not advance | | | | |

Women

| Athlete | Event | Round of 64 | Round of 32 | Round of 16 | Quarterfinal | Semifinal | Final / BM | |
| Athlete | Event | Opposition Score | Opposition Score | Opposition Score | Opposition Score | Opposition Score | Opposition Score | Rank |
|---|---|---|---|---|---|---|---|---|
| Nafi Toure | Individual sabre | González (CUB); L 7–15 | Did not advance | | | | | |

== Judo ==
| Athlete | Event | Preliminary | Round of 32 | Round of 16 | Quarterfinals | Semifinals | Repechage 1 | Repechage 2 | Repechage 3 | Final / BM | |
| Athlete | Event | Opposition Result | Opposition Result | Opposition Result | Opposition Result | Opposition Result | Opposition Result | Opposition Result | Opposition Result | Opposition Result | Rank |
|---|---|---|---|---|---|---|---|---|---|---|---|
| Djegui Bathily | Men's +100 kg | Bye | McCormick (USA); L 0001–0010 | Did not advance | | | | | | | |
| Hortense Diédhiou | Women's −52 kg | —N/a | Bye | Haddad (ALG); L 0001–0010 | Did not advance | | Müller (LUX); L 0001–1001 | Did not advance | | | |
| Cécile Hane | Women's −63 kg | —N/a | Barreto (VEN); L 0000–1012 | Did not advance | | | | | | | |
| Gisèle Mendy | Women's −70 kg | —N/a | Böhm (GER); L 0000–1000 | Did not advance | | | Smal (UKR); L 0000–0201 | Did not advance | | | |

== Swimming ==
Men

| Athlete | Event | Heat | | Semifinal | | Final | |
| Athlete | Event | Time | Rank | Time | Rank | Time | Rank |
|---|---|---|---|---|---|---|---|
| Malick Fall | 100 m breaststroke | 1:02.51 | 48 | Did not advance | | | |

Women

| Athlete | Event | Heat | | Semifinal | | Final | |
| Athlete | Event | Time | Rank | Time | Rank | Time | Rank |
|---|---|---|---|---|---|---|---|
| Binta Zahra Diop | 100 m butterfly | 1:04.26 | 47 | Did not advance | | | |

== Taekwondo ==
| Athlete | Event | Round of 16 | Quarterfinals | Semifinals | Repechage | Bronze Medal | Final | |
| Athlete | Event | Opposition Result | Opposition Result | Opposition Result | Opposition Result | Opposition Result | Opposition Result | Rank |
|---|---|---|---|---|---|---|---|---|
| Bineta Diedhiou | Women's −57 kg | Nguyen (VIE); W 1–0 | Calabrese (ITA); L 0–3 | Did not advance | | | | |

== Wrestling ==
Key:

- VT - Victory by Fall.
- PP - Decision by Points - the loser with technical points.
- PO - Decision by Points - the loser without technical points.

Men's freestyle

| Athlete | Event | Qualification | Round of 16 | Quarterfinal | Semifinal | Repechage 1 | Repechage 2 | Final / BM | |
| Athlete | Event | Opposition Result | Opposition Result | Opposition Result | Opposition Result | Opposition Result | Opposition Result | Opposition Result | Rank |
|---|---|---|---|---|---|---|---|---|---|
| Adama Diatta | −55 kg | Matsunaga (JPN); L 0–5 ^{VT} | Did not advance | | | Akgül (TUR); L 1–3 ^{PP} | Did not advance | | 15 |

== Individual athletes ==
- Cécile Hane (born October 8, 1987) is a Senegalese judoka who represented Senegal at the 2008 Summer Olympics in Beijing, where she competed for the women's half-middleweight class (63 kg). She lost the first preliminary round match to Venezuela's Ysis Barreto, who successfully scored an ippon (full point) and a seoi nage (shoulder throw), at one minute and forty-seven seconds.
