= Senegal at the 1996 Summer Olympics =

- IOC code: SEN
- NOC: Comité National Olympique et Sportif Sénégalais

in Atlanta
- Competitors: 11 in 3 sports
- Flag bearer: Ibou Faye
- Medals: Gold 0 Silver 0 Bronze 0 Total 0

Summer Olympics appearances (overview)
- 1964; 1968; 1972; 1976; 1980; 1984; 1988; 1992; 1996; 2000; 2004; 2008; 2012; 2016; 2020; 2024

Senegal competed at the 1996 Summer Olympics in Atlanta, United States.

== Competitors ==
The following is the list of number of competitors in the Games.

Sport	Men	Women	Total
Athletics	7	0	7
Judo	2	0	2
Wrestling	2	–	2
Total	11	0	11

== Results by event ==
=== Athletics ===
==== Men ====
Track and road events

Athletes	Events	Heat Round 1		Heat Round 2		Semifinal		Final	
Athletes	Events	Time	Rank	Time	Rank	Time	Rank	Time	Rank
Oumar Loum	200 metres	20.69	22 Q	21.31	37	did not advance			
Ibou Faye	400 metres hurdles	48.84	7 Q	N/A		48.84	13	did not advance	
Hamidou M'Baye	400 metres hurdles	50.30	38	N/A		did not advance			
Aboubakry Dia; Tapha Diarra; Ibou Faye; Hachim N'Diaye	4 x 400 metres relay	3:02.61	6 Q	N/A		3:01.72	4 Q	3:00.64	4

Field events

Athlete	Event	Qualification		Final	
Athlete	Event	Result	Rank	Result	Rank
Cheikh Touré	Long jump	7.91	18	did not advance	

=== Judo ===
Men

Athlete	Event	Result
Abdoul Karim Seck	Half-Lightweight	21
Khalifa Diouf	Heavyweight	21

=== Wrestling ===
Freestyle

Athlete	Event	Round 1	Round 2	Quarterfinal	Semifinal	Final	Repechage Round 1	Repechage Round 2	Repechage Round 3	Repechage Round 4	Repechage Round 5	Bronze Medal Bout
Athlete	Event	Opposition Result	Opposition Result	Opposition Result	Opposition Result	Opposition Result	Opposition Result	Opposition Result	Opposition Result	Opposition Result	Opposition Result	Opposition Result
Félix Diédhiou	-68 kg	Kõiv (EST); L Fall	Did not advance				Fórizs (HUN); L 13-1	Did not advance				
Alioune Diouf	-82 kg	Magomedov (RUS); L 3-0	Did not advance				Gogoloshvili (GEO); L 6-2	Did not advance				
