= Senegal at the 2008 Summer Paralympics =

- IPC code: SEN
- NPC: Comité National Provisoire Handisport et Paralympique Sénégalais

in Beijing
- Competitors: 2 in 1 sport
- Flag bearer: Nidiaye Mor
- Medals: Gold 0 Silver 0 Bronze 0 Total 0

Summer Paralympics appearances (overview)
- 2004; 2008; 2012; 2016; 2020; 2024

Senegal sent a delegation to compete at the 2008 Summer Paralympics in Beijing, People's Republic of China.

== Athletics ==
=== Men's field ===
Athlete	Class	Event	Final		
Athlete	Class	Event	Result	Points	Rank
Nidiaye Mor	F57-58	Javelin throw	39.42	836	13

=== Women's track ===
Athlete	Class	Event	Heats		Final	
Athlete	Class	Event	Result	Rank	Result	Rank
Dague Doip	T54	200m	DSQ		did not advance	

== See also ==
- Senegal at the Paralympics
- Senegal at the 2008 Summer Olympics
