= Senegal at the 1984 Summer Olympics =

- IOC code: SEN
- NOC: Comité National Olympique et Sportif Sénégalais

in Los Angeles
- Competitors: 24 (23 men and 1 woman) in 5 sports
- Flag bearer: Amadou Ciré Baal
- Medals: Gold 0 Silver 0 Bronze 0 Total 0

Summer Olympics appearances (overview)
- 1964; 1968; 1972; 1976; 1980; 1984; 1988; 1992; 1996; 2000; 2004; 2008; 2012; 2016; 2020; 2024

Senegal competed at the 1984 Summer Olympics in Los Angeles, United States. Out of 24 contestants, no medals were won by Senegal on this occasion.

== Results by event ==
=== Athletics ===
Men's 100 metres

- Charles-Louis Seck

Men's 400 metres

- Boubacar Diallo

- Heat — 46.73 (→ did not advance)

Men's 800 metres

- Moussa Fall
- Babacar Niang

Men's 400m Hurdles

- Amadou Dia Bâ

Men's 4 × 100 m Relay

- Mamadou Sène
- Hamidou Diawara
- Ibrahima Fall
- Charles-Louis Seck
- Saliou Seck

Men's 4 × 400 m Relay

- Boubacar Diallo
- Babacar Niang
- Moussa Fall
- Amadou Dia Bâ

Men's 3,000 Metres Steeplechase

- Mamadou Boye

Men's Triple Jump

- Mamadou Diallo

Women's High Jump

- Constance Senghor

- Qualification — 1.70m (→ did not advance, 27th place)

=== Judo ===
Men's Extra-Lightweight

- Djibril Sall

Men's Lightweight

- Ibrahima Diallo

Men's Half-Middleweight

- Ousseynou Guèye

Men's Half-Heavyweight

- Abdul Daffé

Men's Heavyweight

- Khalif Diouf

Men's Open Class

- Lansana Coly

=== Sailing ===
Mixed's Windsurfer

- Babacar Wade

=== Shooting ===
Men's Rapid-Fire Pistol (25 metres)

- Mamadou Sow

Men's Free Pistol (50 metres)

- Amadou Ciré Baal

=== Wrestling ===
Men's Freestyle Flyweight

- Talla Diaw

Men's Freestyle Light-Heavyweight

- Amadou Katy Diop

Men's Freestyle Heavyweight

- Ambroise Sarr

Men's Freestyle Super-Heavyweight

- Mamadou Sakho
