= Senegal at the 1976 Summer Olympics =

- IOC code: SEN
- NOC: Comité National Olympique et Sportif Sénégalais

in Montreal Canada
- Competitors: 23
- Medals: Gold 0 Silver 0 Bronze 0 Total 0

Summer Olympics appearances (overview)
- 1964; 1968; 1972; 1976; 1980; 1984; 1988; 1992; 1996; 2000; 2004; 2008; 2012; 2016; 2020; 2024

Senegal competed at the 1976 Summer Olympics in Montreal, Quebec, Canada. Senegal and Ivory Coast were the only two African nations taking part in the games. The other African countries chose to boycott the games to protest IOC's decision to allow New Zealand to compete despite the tour of its rugby team in IOC-banned South Africa.

== Results by events ==
=== Athletics ===
Men's 4 × 100 m Relay

- Christian Dorosario, (Note: also competed at the 1972 Summer Olympics) Momar N'Dao, Barka Sy, and Adama Fall

- Heat — 40.40
- Semi Final — 40.37 (→ did not advance)

Men's Long Jump

- Ibrahima Ba

- Qualification — 6.96m (→ did not advance)

Men's Discus Throw

- Ibrahima Gueye

- Qualification — 52.82m (→ did not advance)

=== Judo ===
Men's lightweight

- Papa M'Bengue (=18th)

Men's half middleweight

- Lamine Wade (=13th)

Men's middleweight

- Assane N'Doye (=19th)

Men's half heavyweight

- Abdoulaye Djiba (=7th)

Men's heavyweight

- Abdoulaye Kote (Note: also competed at the 1980 Summer Olympics) (=7th)

Men's open category

- Abdoulaye Djiba (=16th)
