= Wrestling at the 2000 Summer Olympics – Men's freestyle 85 kg =

Men's freestyle 85 kg at the Games of the XXVII Olympiad
- Venue: Sydney Convention and Exhibition Centre
- Date: 29 September – 1 October 2000
- Competitors: 20 from 20 nations

Medalists
1st place, gold medalist(s)		Adam Saitiev	Russia
2nd place, silver medalist(s)		Yoel Romero	Cuba
3rd place, bronze medalist(s)		Magomed Ibragimov	Macedonia

The men's freestyle 85 kilograms at the 2000 Summer Olympics as part of the wrestling program was held at the Sydney Convention and Exhibition Centre from September 29 to October 1. The competition held with an elimination system of three or four wrestlers in each pool, with the winners qualify for the quarterfinals, semifinals and final by way of direct elimination.

== Schedule ==
All times are Australian Eastern Daylight Time (UTC+11:00)

Date	Time	Event
29 September 2000	09:30	Round 1
29 September 2000	17:00	Round 2
30 September 2000	09:30	Round 3
1 October 2000	09:00	Quarterfinals
1 October 2000	09:00	Semifinals
1 October 2000	14:30	Finals

== Results ==
Legend

- F — Won by fall
- WO — Won by walkover

=== Elimination pools ===
==== Pool 1 ====
Pos	Athlete	Pld	W	L	CP	TP	Qualification
1	Magomed Ibragimov (MKD)	2	2	0	7	7	Knockout round
2	Davyd Bichinashvili (UKR)	2	1	1	4	8	
3	Tatsuo Kawai (JPN)	2	0	2	1	6	

Source: Official Report

	Score		CP
Davyd Bichinashvili (UKR)	1–1	Magomed Ibragimov (MKD)	1–3 PP
Tatsuo Kawai (JPN)	1–7	Davyd Bichinashvili (UKR)	1–3 PP
Magomed Ibragimov (MKD)	6–5 Fall	Tatsuo Kawai (JPN)	4–0 TO

==== Pool 2 ====
Pos	Athlete	Pld	W	L	CP	TP	Qualification
1	Charles Burton (USA)	2	2	0	7	14	Knockout round
2	Alioune Diouf (SEN)	2	1	1	3	10	
3	Grégory Martinetti (SUI)	2	0	2	1	7	

Source: Official Report

	Score		CP
Alioune Diouf (SEN)	10–7	Grégory Martinetti (SUI)	3–1 PP
Charles Burton (USA)	4–0	Alioune Diouf (SEN)	3–0 PO
Grégory Martinetti (SUI)	0–10	Charles Burton (USA)	0–4 ST

==== Pool 3 ====
Pos	Athlete	Pld	W	L	CP	TP	Qualification
1	Adam Saitiev (RUS)	2	2	0	7	15	Knockout round
2	Beibulat Musaev (BLR)	2	1	1	5	14	
3	Igor Praporshchikov (AUS)	2	0	2	0	0	

Source: Official Report

	Score		CP
Adam Saitiev (RUS)	4–1	Beibulat Musaev (BLR)	3–1 PP
Igor Praporshchikov (AUS)	0–11 Fall	Adam Saitiev (RUS)	0–4 TO
Beibulat Musaev (BLR)	13–0	Igor Praporshchikov (AUS)	4–0 ST

==== Pool 4 ====
Pos	Athlete	Pld	W	L	CP	TP	Qualification
1	Yang Hyung-mo (KOR)	2	2	0	6	8	Knockout round
2	Makharbek Khadartsev (UZB)	2	1	1	4	5	
3	Ali Özen (TUR)	2	0	2	1	2	

Source: Official Report

	Score		CP
Makharbek Khadartsev (UZB)	2–3	Yang Hyung-mo (KOR)	1–3 PP
Ali Özen (TUR)	0–3	Makharbek Khadartsev (UZB)	0–3 PO
Yang Hyung-mo (KOR)	5–2	Ali Özen (TUR)	3–1 PP

==== Pool 5 ====
Pos	Athlete	Pld	W	L	CP	TP	Qualification
1	Yoel Romero (CUB)	3	3	0	9	15	Knockout round
2	Magomed Kurugliyev (KAZ)	3	1	2	4	14	
3	Igors Samušonoks (LAT)	3	1	2	4	9	
4	Justin Abdou (CAN)	3	1	2	4	8	

Source: Official Report

	Score		CP
Igors Samušonoks (LAT)	2–3	Justin Abdou (CAN)	1–3 PP
Yoel Romero (CUB)	4–0	Magomed Kurugliyev (KAZ)	3–0 PO
Igors Samušonoks (LAT)	0–3	Yoel Romero (CUB)	0–3 PO
Justin Abdou (CAN)	5–8	Magomed Kurugliyev (KAZ)	1–3 PP
Igors Samušonoks (LAT)	7–6	Magomed Kurugliyev (KAZ)	3–1 PP
Justin Abdou (CAN)	0–8	Yoel Romero (CUB)	0–3 PO

==== Pool 6 ====
Pos	Athlete	Pld	W	L	CP	TP	Qualification
1	Amir Reza Khadem (IRI)	3	3	0	9	14	Knockout round
2	Gábor Kapuvári (HUN)	3	2	1	7	11	
3	Nicolae Ghiță (ROM)	3	1	2	6	14	
4	Vincent Aka-Akesse (CIV)	3	0	3	0	0	

Source: Official Report

	Score		CP
Gábor Kapuvári (HUN)	6–0	Vincent Aka-Akesse (CIV)	3–0 PO
Nicolae Ghiță (ROM)	3–5	Amir Reza Khadem (IRI)	1–3 PP
Gábor Kapuvári (HUN)	2–1	Nicolae Ghiță (ROM)	3–1 PP
Vincent Aka-Akesse (CIV)	0–4	Amir Reza Khadem (IRI)	0–3 PO
Gábor Kapuvári (HUN)	3–5	Amir Reza Khadem (IRI)	1–3 PP
Vincent Aka-Akesse (CIV)	0–10	Nicolae Ghiță (ROM)	0–4 ST

=== Knockout round ===
Quarterfinals
Magomed Ibragimov (MKD)	4
Charles Burton (USA)	2
Adam Saitiev (RUS)	5
Yang Hyung-mo (KOR)	0

Semifinals
Magomed Ibragimov (MKD)	0
Adam Saitiev (RUS)	3
Yoel Romero (CUB)	3
Amir Reza Khadem (IRI)	0

Gold medal match
Adam Saitiev (RUS)	7^{F}
Yoel Romero (CUB)	1
Bronze medal match
Magomed Ibragimov (MKD)	4
Amir Reza Khadem (IRI)	1

Classification 5th–6th
Charles Burton (USA)	WO
Yang Hyung-mo (KOR)

== Final standing ==
Rank	Athlete
1st place, gold medalist(s)	Adam Saitiev (RUS)
2nd place, silver medalist(s)	Yoel Romero (CUB)
3rd place, bronze medalist(s)	Magomed Ibragimov (MKD)
4	Amir Reza Khadem (IRI)
5	Charles Burton (USA)
6	Yang Hyung-mo (KOR)
7	Gábor Kapuvári (HUN)
8	Nicolae Ghiță (ROM)
9	Beibulat Musaev (BLR)
10	Magomed Kurugliyev (KAZ)
11	Igors Samušonoks (LAT)
12	Davyd Bichinashvili (UKR)
13	Justin Abdou (CAN)
14	Makharbek Khadartsev (UZB)
15	Alioune Diouf (SEN)
16	Grégory Martinetti (SUI)
17	Tatsuo Kawai (JPN)
18	Ali Özen (TUR)
19	Igor Praporshchikov (AUS)
20	Vincent Aka-Akesse (CIV)
