= Senegal at the Olympics =

- IOC code: SEN
- NOC: Comité National Olympique et Sportif Sénégalais
- Medals Ranked 137th: Gold 0 Silver 1 Bronze 0 Total 1

Summer appearances
- 1964; 1968; 1972; 1976; 1980; 1984; 1988; 1992; 1996; 2000; 2004; 2008; 2012; 2016; 2020; 2024

Winter appearances
- 1984; 1988; 1992; 1994; 1998–2002; 2006; 2010; 2014–2026

Senegal has sent athletes to all Summer Olympic Games held since 1964. Unlike most surrounding nations, Senegal has never missed any Summer Olympics since its independence. Only once has the country won an Olympic medal: Amadou Dia Ba, who won a silver medal in the men's 400 metre hurdles in 1988. However, Abdoulaye Seye, representing France, won a bronze medal in the 200 metres in 1960, just two months after the short lived Mali Federation gained independence and a few days after Senegal seceded from the federation. Senegal will host the 2026 Summer Youth Olympics in Dakar.

Senegal is among the small group of tropical countries that have participated in the Winter Olympic Games. Its winter athletes have participated in 5 Winter Olympics since 1984, although they have won no medals. Senegal was represented at the 1984, 1992 and 1994 by Lamine Guèye, and in 2006 and 2010 by Leyti Seck.

== Medal tables ==
=== Medals by Summer Games ===
Games	Athletes	Gold	Silver	Bronze	Total	Rank
1964 Tokyo	12	0	0	0	0	–
1968 Mexico City	21	0	0	0	0	–
1972 Munich	38	0	0	0	0	–
1976 Montreal	21	0	0	0	0	–
1980 Moscow	32	0	0	0	0	–
1984 Los Angeles	24	0	0	0	0	–
1988 Seoul	23	0	1	0	1	36
1992 Barcelona	20	0	0	0	0	–
1996 Atlanta	11	0	0	0	0	–
2000 Sydney	26	0	0	0	0	–
2004 Athens	15	0	0	0	0	–
2008 Beijing	15	0	0	0	0	–
2012 London	31	0	0	0	0	–
2016 Rio de Janeiro	22	0	0	0	0	–
2020 Tokyo	9	0	0	0	0	–
2024 Paris	11	0	0	0	0	–
2028 Los Angeles	future event					
2032 Brisbane	future event					
Total		0	1	0	1	137

=== Medals by Winter Games ===
Games	Athletes	Gold	Silver	Bronze	Total	Rank
1984 Sarajevo	1	0	0	0	0	–
1988 Calgary	did not participate					
1992 Albertville	2	0	0	0	0	–
1994 Lillehammer	1	0	0	0	0	–
1998 Nagano	did not participate					
2002 Salt Lake City	did not participate					
2006 Turin	1	0	0	0	0	–
2010 Vancouver	1	0	0	0	0	–
2014 Sochi	did not participate					
2018 Pyeongchang	did not participate					
2022 Beijing	did not participate					
2026 Milano Cortina	did not participate					
2030 French Alps	future event					
2034 Utah	future event					
Total		0	0	0	0	–

=== Medals by summer sport ===
Sport	Gold	Silver	Bronze	Total
Athletics	0	1	0	1
Totals (1 entries)	0	1	0	1

== List of medalists ==
Medal	Name	Games	Sport	Event
Silver	Amadou Dia Ba	1988 Seoul	Athletics	Men's 400 metre hurdles

== See also ==
- List of flag bearers for Senegal at the Olympics
- Senegal at the Paralympics
- Tropical nations at the Winter Olympics
