= Senegal at the 1972 Summer Olympics =

- IOC code: SEN
- NOC: Comité National Olympique et Sportif Sénégalais

in Munich
- Flag bearer: Robert N'Diaye
- Medals: Gold 0 Silver 0 Bronze 0 Total 0

Summer Olympics appearances (overview)
- 1964; 1968; 1972; 1976; 1980; 1984; 1988; 1992; 1996; 2000; 2004; 2008; 2012; 2016; 2020; 2024

Senegal competed at the 1972 Summer Olympics in Munich, West Germany.

== Results by event ==
=== Athletics ===
Men's 800 metres

- Daniel Andrade

- Heat — 1:53.9 (→ did not advance, 52nd place)

Men's 1500 metres

- Daniel Andrade

- Heat — 3:59.2 (→ did not advance)

Men's 5000 metres

- Siatka Badji

- Heat — DNS (→ did not advance)

Men's 4 × 100 m Relay

- Malang Mane, Christian do Rosario, Momar N'Dao, and Barka Sy

- Heat — 40.95s (→ did not advance)

=== Basketball ===
==== Men's team competition ====
- Preliminary Round (Group B)

- Lost to Soviet Union (52-94)
- Lost to Italy (56-92)
- Lost to Poland (59-95)
- Lost to Puerto Rico (57-92)
- Lost to Philippines (62-68)
- Lost to Yugoslavia (57-73)
- Lost to West Germany (62-72)

- Classification Matches

- 13th/16th place: Lost to Japan (67-76)
- 15th/16th place: Walk-over to Egypt (2-0) → 15th place

=== Boxing ===
Men's Bantamweight

- Pierre Amont N'Diaye =17th

Men's Featherweight

- Abdou Faye =33rd

Men's Light welterweight

- Abdou Fall =17th

Men's Light middleweight

- Oumar Fall =32nd
