= Senegal at the 2020 Summer Paralympics =

- IPC code: SEN
- NPC: Comité National Provisoire Handisport et Paralympique Sénégalais

in Tokyo
- Competitors: 1 in 1 sports
- Medals: Gold 0 Silver 0 Bronze 0 Total 0

Summer Paralympics appearances (overview)
- 2004; 2008; 2012; 2016; 2020; 2024

Senegal competed at the 2020 Summer Paralympics in Tokyo, Japan, from 24 August to 5 September 2021.

== Taekwondo ==
Senegal qualified three athletes to compete at the Paralympics competition. Ibrahima Seye Sen qualified by winning the gold medal at the 2020 African Qualification Tournament in Rabat, Morocco.

Athlete
Event
First round
Quarterfinals/Repechage 1
Semifinals/Repechage 2
Final/Bronze medal
Opposition
Result
Opposition
Result
Opposition
Result
Opposition
Result
Opposition
Result
Rank
Ibrahima Seye Sen
Men's –75 kg
Fatih Çelik

Turkey at the 2020 Summer Paralympics

L 19-38

DID NOT ADVANCE
Shunsuke Kudo

Japan at the 2020 Summer Paralympics

L 31-52

Did not advance
9

== See also ==
- Senegal at the Paralympics
- Senegal at the 2020 Summer Olympics
