= Senegal at the 1980 Summer Olympics =

- IOC code: SEN
- NOC: Comité National Olympique et Sportif Sénégalais

in Moscow
- Competitors: 34
- Medals: Gold 0 Silver 0 Bronze 0 Total 0

Summer Olympics appearances (overview)
- 1964; 1968; 1972; 1976; 1980; 1984; 1988; 1992; 1996; 2000; 2004; 2008; 2012; 2016; 2020; 2024

Senegal competed at the 1980 Summer Olympics in Moscow, USSR.

== Results by event ==
=== Athletics ===
Men's 100 metres

- Momar N'Dao

- Heat — 10.73 (→ did not advance)

- Boubacar Diallo

- Heat — 10.75 (→ did not advance)

Men's 200 metres

- Cheikh Touradé Diouf

- Heat — 21.98 (→ did not advance)

Men's 110 m Hurdles

- Abdoulaye Sarr

- Heat — 14.57 (→ did not advance)

Men's High Jump

- Moussa Sagna Fall

- Qualification — 2.10 m (→ did not advance)

Men's Long Jump

- Doudou N'Diaye

- Qualification — 7.66 m (→ did not advance)

Men's Triple Jump

- Abdoulaye Diallo

- Qualification — 15.68 m (→ did not advance)

Women's 100 metres

- Françoise Damado

- Heat — 12.16 (→ did not advance)

- Marième Boyé

- Heat — 12.42 (→ did not advance)

=== Basketball ===
==== Men's team competition ====
- Preliminary Round (Group B)

- Lost to Yugoslavia (67-104)
- Lost to Spain (65-94)
- Lost to Poland (64-84)

- Second Round (Group B)

- Lost to Sweden (64-70)
- Defeated India (81-59)
- Lost to Australia (64-95)
- Lost to Czechoslovakia (72-88) → 11th place

- Team Roster

- Moussa Mbengue
- Bassirou Badji
- Mamadou Diop
- Yamar Samb
- Mathieu Faye
- Madiagne Ndiaye
- Mouhamadou Moustapha Diop
- Oumar Dia
- Bireyma Sadi Diagne
- Hadramé Ndiaye
- Yaya Cissokho
- Modou Tall

=== Judo ===
- Karim Badiane
- Akilong Diaboné
- Niokhor Diongué
- Abdoulaye Koté
- Djibril Sambou
- Boubacar Sow
- Alassane Thioub

=== Wrestling ===
- Amadou Katy Diop
- Amboise Sarr
- Mamadou Sakho
