= Senegal at the 2016 Summer Paralympics =

- IPC code: SEN
- NPC: Comité National Provisoire Handisport et Paralympique Sénégalais

in Rio de Janeiro
- Competitors: 2 in 1 sports
- Flag bearer: Youssoupha Diouf
- Medals: Gold 0 Silver 0 Bronze 0 Total 0

Summer Paralympics appearances (overview)
- 2004; 2008; 2012; 2016; 2020; 2024

Senegal sent a delegation to compete at the 2016 Summer Paralympics in Rio de Janeiro, Brazil, from 7 to 18 September 2016. This was the fourth successive appearance for the nation in a Summer Paralympic Games after it debuted at the 2004 Summer Paralympics. Youssouphua Diouf, a javelin thrower, and shot put and discus thrower Daque Diop were the two athletes sent to Rio de Janeiro by Senegal. The delegation failed to win the country's first medal at the Summer Paralympics as its best performance in these Games was Diouf's seventh position in the men's javelin F56-57 event.

== Background ==
Senegal first entered Paralympic competition at the 2004 Summer Paralympics. They have participated in every Summer Paralympic Games since, making Rio de Janeiro their fourth appearance in a Summer Paralympiad. Senegal had yet to win its first Paralympic medal at the close of the Rio Games. The 2016 Summer Paralympics were held from 7–18 September 2016 with a total of 4,328 athletes representing 159 National Paralympic Committees taking part. The nation sent two athletes to compete in the Rio de Janeiro Paralympics: javelin thrower Youssoupha Diouf and shot put and discus thrower Dague Diop. Both athletes travelled to Brazil on 30 August as part of their final preparation for the Games. Diouf was selected to be the flag bearer for the parade of nations during the opening ceremony.

== Disability classifications ==
Every participant at the Paralympics has their disability grouped into one of five disability categories; amputation, the condition may be congenital or sustained through injury or illness; cerebral palsy; wheelchair athletes, there is often overlap between this and other categories; visual impairment, including blindness; Les autres, any physical disability that does not fall strictly under one of the other categories, for example dwarfism or multiple sclerosis. Each Paralympic sport then has its own classifications, dependent upon the specific physical demands of competition. Events are given a code, made of numbers and letters, describing the type of event and classification of the athletes competing. Some sports, such as athletics, divide athletes by both the category and severity of their disabilities, other sports, for example swimming, group competitors from different categories together, the only separation being based on the severity of the disability.

== Athletics ==
Youssoupha Diouf contracted polio when he was a child and has occasionally had to use a wheelchair since because the disease has weakened the muscles in both of his legs. He was 29 years old at the time of the Rio Summer Paralympics and this was his maiden appearance in the multi-sport event. Diouf qualified for the Games by meeting the "A" qualifying standards because of his fourth-place finish in the men's javelin throw at the 2015 IPC Athletics World Championships in October that year. This was the first time a Senegalese athlete attained automatic qualification for a Paralympic Games. He is classified as F57 by the International Paralympic Committee (IPC) and competes in a sitting position. Diouf trained at the H2 Dynamic Handysports Lombardia in the city of Milan as part of an agreement between the Senegalese National Paralympic Committee and the Italian sporting authorities to allow his preparation for the Paralympics. He said that he would showcase his success in Senegal in the event he won a medal at the Games. On September 8, Diouf took part in the men's javelin F56–57 event. He finished seventh out of fourteen athletes, with a throw of 41.83 metres which he recorded on his final try, his best mark of the season.

Dague Diop was 35 years old at the time of the Rio Paralympic Games and she was entering her second Summer Paralympics after representing Senegal at the 2008 Summer Paralympics. She is classified as F57 by the IPC and competes in a wheelchair. Diop received a wild card invitation to participate in the Paralympics because of her good performance at the 2015 African Games. With a scholarship from the Senegalese Ministry of Sport, she trained at the Stade Léopold Sédar Senghor in Dakar to prepare for the Paralympics. Diop's girlfriend revealed that the athlete's objective was to win a medal in Rio de Janeiro, "Every time she went to a tournament, she came back with a distinction. She is determined. I'm sure she will not come back empty handed." She took part in the women's shot put F56–57 competition with eleven more athletes on 8 September, placing eleventh (and last) out of all the finishing athletes, with a throw of 4.53 metres. (Note: One athlete, Safia Djelal, failed to set a mark.) Seven days later, Diop partook in the women's discus F56–57 event along with thirteen more competitors. She ranked thirteenth (and last) out of all the athletes who completed the competition, with a mark of 9.59 metres. (Note: One competitor, Tsogtgerel Gendendarjaa, did not record a mark.)

Men's Field

Athlete	Events	Result	Rank
Youssoupha Diouf	Javelin F56–57	41.83	7

Women's Field

Athlete	Events	Result	Rank
Dague Diop	Shot Put F56–57	4.53	11
Dague Diop	Discus F56–57	9.59	13

== See also ==
- Senegal at the 2016 Summer Olympics
