= Senegal at the 1964 Summer Olympics =

- IOC code: SEN (SGL used at these Games)
- NOC: Comité National Olympique et Sportif Sénégalais

in Tokyo
- Medals: Gold 0 Silver 0 Bronze 0 Total 0

Summer Olympics appearances (overview)
- 1964; 1968; 1972; 1976; 1980; 1984; 1988; 1992; 1996; 2000; 2004; 2008; 2012; 2016; 2020; 2024

Senegal competed in the Summer Olympic Games for the first time at the 1964 Summer Olympics in Tokyo, Japan.
