= Senegal at the 1968 Summer Olympics =

- IOC code: SEN
- NOC: Comité National Olympique et Sportif Sénégalais

in Mexico City
- Competitors: 21
- Medals: Gold 0 Silver 0 Bronze 0 Total 0

Summer Olympics appearances (overview)
- 1964; 1968; 1972; 1976; 1980; 1984; 1988; 1992; 1996; 2000; 2004; 2008; 2012; 2016; 2020; 2024

Senegal competed at the 1968 Summer Olympics in Mexico City, Mexico.

== Basketball ==
Senegal qualified for the first time in basketball at the 1968 Olympics by winning the 1968 FIBA Africa Championship in Morocco over the Moroccan hosts. However, once at the tournament, Senegal lost all 7 of its matches to the Americans, Puerto Ricans, Italians, Panamanians, Yugoslavs, Filipinos and Spaniards on their way to last place in the tournament.
