= Senegal at the 2024 Summer Olympics =

- IOC code: SEN
- NOC: Comité National Olympique et Sportif Sénégalais

in Paris, France 26 July 2024 – 11 August 2024
- Competitors: 11 (7 men and 4 women) in 7 sports
- Flag bearers: Louis François Mendy & Combe Seck
- Medals: Gold 0 Silver 0 Bronze 0 Total 0

Summer Olympics appearances (overview)
- 1964; 1968; 1972; 1976; 1980; 1984; 1988; 1992; 1996; 2000; 2004; 2008; 2012; 2016; 2020; 2024

Senegal competed at the 2024 Summer Olympics in Paris from 26 July to 11 August 2024. It was the nation's sixteenth consecutive appearance at the Summer Olympics.

== Competitors ==
The following is the list of number of competitors in the Games.

Sport	Men	Women	Total
Athletics	2	1	3
Canoeing	1	1	2
Fencing	0	1	1
Judo	1	0	1
Swimming	1	1	2
Table tennis	1	0	1
Taekwondo	1	0	1
Total	7	4	11

== Athletics ==
Senegalese track and field athletes achieved the entry standards for Paris 2024, either by passing the direct qualifying mark (or time for track and road races) or by world ranking, in the following events (a maximum of 3 athletes each):

Key

- Note–Ranks given for track events are within the athlete's heat only
- Q = Qualified for the next round
- q = Qualified for the next round as a fastest loser or, in field events, by position without achieving the qualifying target
- NR = National record
- N/A = Round not applicable for the event
- Bye = Athlete not required to compete in round

Track & road events

Athlete	Event	Heat		Repechage		Semifinal		Final	
Athlete	Event	Result	Rank	Result	Rank	Result	Rank	Result	Rank
Cheikh Tidiane Diouf	Men's 400 m	45.59	5 R	45.03	2 q	44.94	6	Did not advance	
Louis François Mendy	Men's 110 m hurdles	13:31	1 Q	Bye		13.34	3	Did not advance	

Field events

Athlete	Event	Qualification		Final	
Athlete	Event	Distance	Position	Distance	Position
Saly Sarr	Women's triple jump	13.96	17	Did not advance	

== Canoeing ==
=== Slalom ===
Senegal canoeists confirmed a boat in the men's C-1 for the Games, following their results as the highest ranked eligible nation's, through the 2024 African Qualification Tournament in Sainte-Suzanne, Réunion, France.

Athlete	Event	Preliminary						Semifinal		Final	
Athlete	Event	Run 1	Rank	Run 2	Rank	Best	Rank	Time	Rank	Time	Rank
Yves Bourhis	Men's C-1	94.68	9	92.14	2	92.14	5	99.51	9	145.78	12
Yves Bourhis	Men's K-1	150.11	24	97.85	18	97.85	22	Did not advance			

Kayak cross

Athlete	Event	Time trial		Round 1	Repechage	Heat	Quarterfinal	Semifinal	Final	
Athlete	Event	Time	Rank	Position	Position	Position	Position	Position	Position	Rank
Yves Bourhis	Men's KX-1	78.15	31	2 Q	Bye	3	Did not advance			19

=== Sprint ===
Senegalese female canoeists qualified one boat for the Games through the result of highest rank eligible nation's in the C-1 200 metres event at the 2023 African Olympic in Abuja, Nigeria.

Athlete	Event	Heats		Quarterfinals		Semifinals		Final	
Athlete	Event	Time	Rank	Time	Rank	Time	Rank	Time	Rank
Combe Seck	Women's C-1 200 m	54.76	7	53.82	7	Did not advance			

Qualification Legend: FA = Qualify to final (medal); FB = Qualify to final B (non-medal)

== Fencing ==
Senegal entered one fencer into the Olympic competition. Tokyo 2020 Olympian Ndèye Binta Diongue, qualified for the games by winning the gold medal in the women's individual épée events, at the 2024 African Zonal Qualifying Tournament in Algiers, Algeria.

Athlete	Event	Round of 64	Round of 32	Round of 16	Quarterfinal	Semifinal	Final / BM	
Athlete	Event	Opposition Score	Opposition Score	Opposition Score	Opposition Score	Opposition Score	Opposition Score	Rank
Ndèye Binta Diongue	Women's épée	Hussein (EGY); L 14–15	Did not advance					

== Judo ==
Senegal qualified one judoka for the following weight class at the Games. Mbagnick Ndiaye (men's heavyweight, +100 kg) got qualified via continental quota based on Olympic point rankings.

Athlete	Event	Round of 32	Round of 16	Quarterfinals	Semifinals	Repechage	Final / BM	
Athlete	Event	Opposition Result	Opposition Result	Opposition Result	Opposition Result	Opposition Result	Opposition Result	Rank
Mbagnick Ndiaye	Men's +100 kg	Mane (GBS); W 10–00	Tushishvili (GEO); L 00–10	Did not advance				

== Swimming ==
Senegal sent two swimmers to compete at the 2024 Paris Olympics.

Athlete	Event	Heat		Semifinal		Final	
Athlete	Event	Time	Rank	Time	Rank	Time	Rank
Matthieu Seye	Men's 100 m freestyle	50.84	51	Did not advance			
Oumy Diop	Women's 100 m butterfly	1:01.82	27	Did not advance			

== Table tennis ==
Senegal entered one table tennis player into Paris 2024. Tokyo 2020 Olympian, Ibrahima Diaw (table tennis) qualified for the games by virtue of the top twelve ranked players, in the men's single event, through the cut-off of the world ranking for Paris 2024.

Athlete	Event	Preliminary	Round 1	Round 2	Round 3	Round of 16	Quarterfinals	Semifinals	Final / BM	
Athlete	Event	Opposition Result	Opposition Result	Opposition Result	Opposition Result	Opposition Result	Opposition Result	Opposition Result	Opposition Result	Rank
Ibrahima Diaw	Men's singles	Shrestha (NEP); W 4–0	Wong (HKG); L 3–4	Did not advance						

== Taekwondo ==
For the first time since 2016, Senegal qualified one athlete to compete at the games. Boucar Diop qualified for Paris 2024 following the triumph of his victory in the semifinal results, at the 2024 African Qualification Tournament in Dakar.

Athlete	Event	Qualification	Round of 16	Quarterfinals	Semifinals	Repechage	Final / BM	
Athlete	Event	Opposition Result	Opposition Result	Opposition Result	Opposition Result	Opposition Result	Opposition Result	Rank
Boucar Diop	Men's −58 kg	Korneev (SRB); L 0–2 (3–6, 0–5)	Did not advance					
