= Senegal at the 2012 Summer Olympics =

- IOC code: SEN
- NOC: Comité National Olympique et Sportif Sénégalais

in London
- Competitors: 32 in 8 sports
- Flag bearer: Hortense Diédhiou
- Medals: Gold 0 Silver 0 Bronze 0 Total 0

Summer Olympics appearances (overview)
- 1964; 1968; 1972; 1976; 1980; 1984; 1988; 1992; 1996; 2000; 2004; 2008; 2012; 2016; 2020; 2024

Senegal competed at the 2012 Summer Olympics in London, from 27 July to 12 August 2012. This was the nation's thirteenth appearance at the Olympics.

The Senegalese National Olympic and Sports Committee (French: Comité National Olympique et Sportif Sénégalais) sent the nation's second-largest delegation ever to the Games, tying with the delegation sent to Moscow in 1980. A total of 32 athletes, 25 men and 7 women, competed in 8 sports. Men's football was the only team-based sport in which Senegal was represented at these Olympic Games. There was only a single competitor in sprint canoeing, fencing, judo, and taekwondo.

Four Senegalese athletes had competed in Beijing, including Ndiss Kaba Badji, who finished sixth in men's long jump. Breaststroke swimmer Malick Fall became the first Senegalese athlete to compete in four Olympic Games. Meanwhile, track sprinter Amy Mbacké Thiam made her Olympic comeback in London after an eight-year absence. Judoka and double African champion Hortense Diédhiou was the nation's flag bearer at the opening ceremony.

Senegal, however, failed to win its first Olympic medal since the 1988 Summer Olympics in Seoul, where Amadou Dia Bâ won silver in the 400m hurdles.

== Athletics ==
Senegalese athletes have so far achieved qualifying standards in the following athletics events (up to a maximum of 3 athletes in each event at the 'A' Standard, and 1 at the 'B' Standard):

Key

- Note – Ranks given for track events are within the athlete's heat only
- Q = Qualified for the next round
- q = Qualified for the next round as a fastest loser or, in field events, by position without achieving the qualifying target
- NR = National record
- N/A = Round not applicable for the event
- Bye = Athlete not required to compete in round

Men
Track & road events

Athlete	Event	Heat		Semifinal		Final	
Athlete	Event	Result	Rank	Result	Rank	Result	Rank
Moussa Dembélé	110 m hurdles	DSQ		Did not advance			
Mamadou Kassé Hanne	400 m hurdles	49.63	3 Q	48.80	5	Did not advance	

Field events

Athlete	Event	Qualification		Final	
Athlete	Event	Distance	Position	Distance	Position
Ndiss Kaba Badji	Long jump	7.66	24	Did not advance	

Women
Track & road events

Athlete	Event	Heat		Semifinal		Final	
Athlete	Event	Result	Rank	Result	Rank	Result	Rank
Ndeye Fatou Soumah	200 m	23.89	9	Did not advance			
Amy Mbacké Thiam	400 m	53.23	4	Did not advance			

Field events

Athlete	Event	Qualification		Final	
Athlete	Event	Distance	Position	Distance	Position
Amy Sene	Hammer throw	65.49	32	Did not advance	

== Canoeing ==
=== Sprint ===
Athlete	Event	Heats		Semifinals		Final	
Athlete	Event	Time	Rank	Time	Rank	Time	Rank
Ndiatte Gueye	Men's C-1 200 m	51.708	6 Q	50.798	8	Did not advance	
Ndiatte Gueye	Men's C-1 1000 m	4:33.884	5 Q	4:37.171	7 FB	4:32.251	13

Qualification Legend: FA = Qualify to final (medal); FB = Qualify to final B (non-medal)

== Fencing ==
Senegal has qualified 1 fencer.

Men

Athlete	Event	Round of 32	Round of 16	Quarterfinal	Semifinal	Final / BM	
Athlete	Event	Opposition Score	Opposition Score	Opposition Score	Opposition Score	Opposition Score	Rank
Alexandre Bouzaid	Individual épée	Zawrotniak (POL); W 15–11	Pizzo (ITA); L 11–15	Did not advance			

== Football ==
Senegal has qualified a men's team.

- Men's team event – 1 team of 18 players

=== Men's tournament ===
Team roster

The following is the Senegal squad in the men's football tournament of the 2012 Summer Olympics.

Coach: Joseph Koto

No.	Pos.	Player	Date of birth (age)	Caps	Goals	2012 club
1	GK	Ousmane Mané	1 October 1990 (aged 21)			(Senegalese Football Federation) Diambars
2	DF	Saliou Ciss	15 September 1989 (aged 22)			(Norwegian Football Federation) Tromsø
3	MF	Ibrahima Seck	10 August 1989 (aged 22)			(French Football Federation) Épinal
4	DF	Abdoulaye Ba	1 January 1991 (aged 21)			(Portuguese Football Federation) Académica
5	DF	Papa Gueye*	7 June 1984 (aged 28)			(Ukrainian Association of Football) Metalist Kharkiv
6	DF	Zargo Touré	11 November 1989 (aged 22)			(French Football Federation) Boulogne
7	FW	Moussa Konaté	3 April 1993 (aged 19)			(Israel Football Association) Maccabi Tel Aviv
8	MF	Cheikhou Kouyaté	21 December 1989 (aged 22)			(Royal Belgian Football Association) Anderlecht
9	DF	Kara Mbodj	11 November 1989 (aged 22)			(Norwegian Football Federation) Tromsø
10	MF	Sadio Mané	10 April 1992 (aged 20)			(French Football Federation) Metz
11	FW	Kalidou Yéro	19 August 1991 (aged 20)			(Portuguese Football Federation) Gil Vicente
12	FW	Ibrahima Baldé	4 April 1989 (aged 23)			(Royal Spanish Football Federation) Osasuna
13	MF	Mohamed Diamé* (c)	14 June 1987 (aged 25)			(The Football Association) West Ham United
14	MF	Idrissa Gueye	26 September 1989 (aged 22)			(French Football Federation) Lille
15	FW	Magaye Gueye	6 July 1990 (aged 22)			(The Football Association) Everton
16	DF	Pape Souare	6 June 1990 (aged 22)			(French Football Federation) Lille
17	MF	Stéphane Badji	29 May 1990 (aged 22)			(Norwegian Football Federation) Sogndal
18	GK	Papa Camara	16 January 1993 (aged 19)			(French Football Federation) Sochaux

* Over-aged player.

Group play

Pos	Team	Pld	W	D	L	GF	GA	GD	Pts	Qualification
1	Great Britain (H)	3	2	1	0	5	2	+3	7	Advance to knockout stage
2	Senegal	3	1	2	0	4	2	+2	5	Advance to knockout stage
3	Uruguay	3	1	0	2	2	4	−2	3	
4	United Arab Emirates	3	0	1	2	3	6	−3	1	

Source: FIFA
Rules for classification: Group stage tiebreakers
(H) Hosts
26 July 2012
20:00

Great Britain	1–1	Senegal
Bellamy 20'	Report	Konaté 82'

Old Trafford, Manchester
Attendance: 72,176
Referee: Ravshan Irmatov (Uzbekistan)

29 July 2012
17:00

Senegal	2–0	Uruguay
Konaté 10', 37'	Report

Wembley Stadium, London
Attendance: 75,093
Referee: Felix Brych (Germany)

1 August 2012
19:45

Senegal	1–1	United Arab Emirates
Konaté 49'	Report	Matar 21'

City of Coventry Stadium, Coventry
Attendance: 28,652
Referee: Svein Oddvar Moen (Norway)

Quarter-final

4 August 2012
14:30

Mexico	4–2 (a.e.t.)	Senegal
Enríquez 10'; Aquino 62'; Dos Santos 98'; Herrera 109'	Report	Konaté 69'; Baldé 76'

Wembley Stadium, London
Attendance: 81,855
Referee: Mark Clattenburg (Great Britain)

== Judo ==
Athlete	Event	Round of 32	Round of 16	Quarterfinals	Semifinals	Repechage	Final / BM	
Athlete	Event	Opposition Result	Opposition Result	Opposition Result	Opposition Result	Opposition Result	Opposition Result	Rank
Hortense Diédhiou	Women's −57 kg	Bye	Filzmoser (AUT); L 0001–1001	Did not advance				

== Swimming ==
Senegalese swimmers have so far achieved qualifying standards in one event (up to a maximum of 2 swimmers in each event at the Olympic Qualifying Time (OQT), and potentially 1 at the Olympic Selection Time (OST)): Senegal also gained a "Universality place" from the FINA.

Men

Athlete	Event	Heat		Semifinal		Final	
Athlete	Event	Time	Rank	Time	Rank	Time	Rank
Malick Fall	100 m breaststroke	1:02.93	37	Did not advance			

Women

Athlete	Event	Heat		Semifinal		Final	
Athlete	Event	Time	Rank	Time	Rank	Time	Rank
Mareme Faye	100 m freestyle	1:06.42	46	Did not advance			

== Taekwondo ==
Senegal has qualified 1 athlete.

Athlete	Event	Round of 16	Quarterfinals	Semifinals	Repechage	Bronze Medal	Final	
Athlete	Event	Opposition Result	Opposition Result	Opposition Result	Opposition Result	Opposition Result	Opposition Result	Rank
Bineta Diedhiou	Women's −57 kg	Mikkonen (FIN); L 6–9	Did not advance					

== Wrestling ==
Senegal has qualified two quota places.

Key:

- VT – Victory by Fall.
- PP – Decision by Points – the loser with technical points.
- PO – Decision by Points – the loser without technical points.

Men's freestyle

Athlete	Event	Qualification	Round of 16	Quarterfinal	Semifinal	Repechage 1	Repechage 2	Final / BM	
Athlete	Event	Opposition Result	Opposition Result	Opposition Result	Opposition Result	Opposition Result	Opposition Result	Opposition Result	Rank
Malal Ndiaye	−120 kg	Bye	Jargalsaikhany (MGL); L 0–3 ^{PO}	Did not advance					14

Women's freestyle

Athlete	Event	Qualification	Round of 16	Quarterfinal	Semifinal	Repechage 1	Repechage 2	Final / BM	
Athlete	Event	Opposition Result	Opposition Result	Opposition Result	Opposition Result	Opposition Result	Opposition Result	Opposition Result	Rank
Isabelle Sambou	−48 kg	Bye	Benie (CIV); W 3–0 ^{PO}	Obara (JPN); L 0–3 ^{PO}	Did not advance	Bye	Mezien (TUN); W 5–0 ^{VT}	Huynh (CAN); L 0–3 ^{PO}	5
