= Senegal at the 2004 Summer Paralympics =

- IPC code: SEN
- NPC: Comité National Provisoire Handisport et Paralympique Sénégalais

in Athens
- Competitors: 2 in 1 sport
- Flag bearer: Mada Sow
- Medals: Gold 0 Silver 0 Bronze 0 Total 0

Summer Paralympics appearances (overview)
- 2004; 2008; 2012; 2016; 2020; 2024

Senegal made its first appearance in a Paralympic Games at the 2004 Summer Paralympics in Athens, Greece. The team included two athletes, one man and one woman, neither of whom won a medal.

== Sports ==
=== Athletics ===
==== Men's track ====
Athlete	Class	Event	Heats		Semifinal		Final	
Athlete	Class	Event	Result	Rank	Result	Rank	Result	Rank
Ousmane Ndong	T46	100m	12.13	10	did not advance			
Ousmane Ndong	T46	200m	24.72	13	did not advance			

==== Women's track ====
Athlete	Class	Event	Heats		Semifinal		Final	
Athlete	Class	Event	Result	Rank	Result	Rank	Result	Rank
Mada Sow	T53	100m	19.94	11	did not advance			

== See also ==
- Senegal at the Paralympics
- Senegal at the 2004 Summer Olympics
