= Mamadou Diop (basketball, born 1955) =

Senegalese basketball player

Mamadou Diop (born 26 March 1955) is a former Senegalese basketball player with AS Forces Armées. Diop competed for Senegal at the 1980 Summer Olympics, where he scored 29 points in 6 games.
