= Senegal at the 2016 Summer Olympics =

- IOC code: SEN
- NOC: Comité National Olympique et Sportif Sénégalais

in Rio de Janeiro
- Competitors: 22 in 7 sports
- Flag bearer: Isabelle Sambou
- Medals: Gold 0 Silver 0 Bronze 0 Total 0

Summer Olympics appearances (overview)
- 1964; 1968; 1972; 1976; 1980; 1984; 1988; 1992; 1996; 2000; 2004; 2008; 2012; 2016; 2020; 2024

Senegal competed at the 2016 Summer Olympics in Rio de Janeiro, from August 5 to 21, 2016. It was the nation's fourteenth consecutive appearance at the Summer Olympics since its debut in 1964.

The Senegalese National Olympic and Sports Committee (French: Comité National Olympique et Sportif Sénégalais, CNOSS) confirmed a team of 22 athletes, 6 men and 16 women, to compete in seven different sports at the Games. The nation's full roster in Rio de Janeiro was roughly nine athletes smaller than those sent to the London Games and also featured more female athletes than males for the third time in its Summer Olympic history. Women's basketball was the only collective sport in which Senegal had representatives at the Games, returning to the Olympic scene for the first time since 2000.

The Senegalese roster featured four returning Olympians from London 2012; among them were French-born épée fencer Alexandre Bouzaid, hammer thrower Amy Sene, judoka Hortense Diédhiou, who became the nation's first female athlete to compete in four Olympic Games. Meanwhile, freestyle wrestler Isabelle Sambou, who narrowly missed out the nation's first medal in twenty-four years, led the delegation as the most successful athlete of the previous Games and as Senegal's flag bearer in the opening ceremony.

Senegal, however, failed to win its first Olympic medal since the 1988 Summer Olympics in Seoul, where Amadou Dia Bâ obtained the silver in the men's 400 m hurdles.

== Athletics ==
Senegalese athletes have so far achieved qualifying standards in the following athletics events (up to a maximum of 3 athletes in each event):

Key

- Note–Ranks given for track events are within the athlete's heat only
- Q = Qualified for the next round
- q = Qualified for the next round as a fastest loser or, in field events, by position without achieving the qualifying target
- NR = National record
- N/A = Round not applicable for the event
- Bye = Athlete not required to compete in round

Track & road events

Athlete	Event	Heat		Semifinal		Final	
Athlete	Event	Result	Rank	Result	Rank	Result	Rank
Amadou N'Diaye	Men's 400 m hurdles	49.91	6	Did not advance			

Field events

Athlete	Event	Qualification		Final	
Athlete	Event	Distance	Position	Distance	Position
Amy Sene	Women's hammer throw	64.83	25	Did not advance	

== Basketball ==
=== Women's tournament ===
Senegal women's basketball team qualified for the Olympics by winning the gold medal and clinching the outright Olympic berth at the AfroBasket Women 2015 in Yaoundé, Cameroon, signifying the nation's return to the sport for the first time since 2000.

Team roster

The following is the Senegal roster for the women's basketball tournament of the 2016 Summer Olympics.

Senegal women's national basketball team – 2016 Summer Olympics roster
Players
Coaches

Pos.	No.	Name	Age – Date of birth	Height	Club	Ctr.
G	4	Oumoul Thiam	26 – 3 February 1990	1.79 m (5 ft 10 in)	C.D. Promete	(Spain)
G	5	Aya Traoré	33 – 27 July 1983	1.83 m (6 ft 0 in)	CB Conquero	(Spain)
PG	6	Bintou Diémé	32 – 1 February 1984	1.67 m (5 ft 6 in)	Tarbes Gespe Bigorre	(France)
PG	7	Fatou Dieng	32 – 18 August 1983	1.67 m (5 ft 6 in)	CB Al-Qázeres	(Spain)
F	8	Mame Diodio Diouf	31 – 15 December 1984	1.70 m (5 ft 7 in)	Reus Deportiu	(Spain)
C	9	Lala Wane	27 – 5 July 1989	1.79 m (5 ft 10 in)	Wasquehal Fémina	(France)
PF	10	Astou Traoré	35 – 30 April 1981	1.85 m (6 ft 1 in)	Saint-Amand	(France)
C	11	Maimouna Diarra	25 – 30 January 1991	1.98 m (6 ft 6 in)	Primeiro de Agosto	(Angola)
PF	12	Mame-Marie Sy	31 – 25 March 1985	1.85 m (6 ft 1 in)	ESB Villeneuve-d'Ascq	(France)
PF	13	Oumou Touré	28 – 18 February 1988	1.89 m (6 ft 2 in)	Toulouse	(France)
C	14	Marie-Sadio Rosche	28 – 10 August 1987	1.87 m (6 ft 2 in)	Avenir Basket Chartres	(France)
G	15	Aida Fall	29 – 11 October 1986	1.93 m (6 ft 4 in)	AL Le Havre	(France)

Head coach

- (Senegal) Mamadou Gaye

Assistant coach(es)

- (Senegal) Papa Courbary
- (Senegal) Elhadji Diop

Legend

- (C) Team captain
- Club – describes last
  club before the tournament
- Age – describes age
  on 6 August 2016

Group play

Pos	Team	Pld	W	L	PF	PA	PD	Pts	Qualification
1	United States	5	5	0	520	316	+204	10	Quarter-finals
2	Spain	5	4	1	387	333	+54	9	Quarter-finals
3	Canada	5	3	2	340	347	−7	8	Quarter-finals
4	Serbia	5	2	3	385	406	−21	7	Quarter-finals
5	China	5	1	4	371	428	−57	6	
6	Senegal	5	0	5	309	482	−173	5	

Source: FIBA
Rules for classification: 1) points; 2) head-to-head points; 3) head-to-head points difference; 4) head-to-head number of points scored.

7 August 2016
12:00

Boxscore

United States	121–56	Senegal
Scoring by quarter: 35–9, 29–12, 30–17, 27–18
Pts: three players 15; Rebs: Fowles, Griner 7 Asts: Bird 8		Pts: Dieng 10; Rebs: Diarra, Ay. Traoré 5 Asts: Dieng 4

Youth Arena, Rio de Janeiro
Attendance: 2,219
Referees: Cristiano Maranho (BRA), Ahmed Al-Bulushi (OMA), Nadege Zouzou (CIV)

8 August 2016
19:45

Boxscore

Senegal	64–101	China
Scoring by quarter: 21–26, 17–21, 15–26, 11–28
Pts: As. Traoré 16; Rebs: Diarra 8 Asts: Dieng 4		Pts: Shao, Sun Mengr. 17; Rebs: Lu 7 Asts: Zhao 6

Youth Arena, Rio de Janeiro
Attendance: 2,907
Referees: Karen Lasuik (CAN), Carlos Júlio (ANG), Chahinaz Boussetta (MAR)

10 August 2016
17:45

Boxscore

Senegal	58–68	Canada
Scoring by quarter: 10–17, 14–16, 17–22, 17–13
Pts: Traore 24; Rebs: Diarra 9 Asts: Diémé 6		Pts: Nurse 14; Rebs: Tatham 10; Asts: Langolis 6

Youth Arena, Rio de Janeiro
Attendance: 2,640
Referees: Anne Panther (GER), Carlos Júlio (ANG), Ahmed Al-Bulushi (OMA)

12 August 2016
17:45

Boxscore

Spain	97–43	Senegal
Scoring by quarter: 26–11, 20–8, 25–13, 26–11
Pts: Torrens 14; Rebs: Nicholls 7 Asts: four players 5		Pts: Sy 16; Rebs: Diarra 6 Asts: three players 2

Youth Arena, Rio de Janeiro
Attendance: 3,329
Referees: Scott Beker (AUS), Leandro Lezcano (ARG), Chahinaz Boussetta (MAR)

14 August 2016
15:30

Boxscore

Senegal	88–95	Serbia
Scoring by quarter: 15–27, 28–28, 23–21, 22–19
Pts: As. Traoré 30; Rebs: As. Traoré 8 Asts: Diouf 8		Pts: Petrović 20; Rebs: Page 8 Asts: A. Dabović 8

Youth Arena, Rio de Janeiro
Attendance: 3,113
Referees: Eddie Viator (FRA), Piotr Pastusiak (POL), Hwang In-tae (KOR)

== Canoeing ==
=== Slalom ===
Senegal has qualified one canoeist in the men's C-1 class by obtaining a top finish and an outright Olympic berth at the 2015 African Canoe Slalom Championships in Sagana, Kenya.

Athlete	Event	Preliminary						Semifinal		Final	
Athlete	Event	Run 1	Rank	Run 2	Rank	Best	Rank	Time	Rank	Time	Rank
Jean-Pierre Bourhis	Men's C-1	110.94	16	109.27	15	109.27	18	Did not advance			

== Fencing ==
Senegal has entered one fencer into the Olympic competition. French-born and 2012 Olympian Alexandre Bouzaid had claimed a spot in the men's épée, as the highest ranking fencer from Africa outside the world's top eight qualified teams in the FIE Adjusted Official Rankings.

Athlete	Event	Round of 64	Round of 32	Round of 16	Quarterfinal	Semifinal	Final / BM	
Athlete	Event	Opposition Score	Opposition Score	Opposition Score	Opposition Score	Opposition Score	Opposition Score	Rank
Alexandre Bouzaid	Men's épée	Bye	Boczkó (HUN); L 9–15	Did not advance				

== Judo ==
Senegal has qualified one judoka for the women's lightweight category (57 kg) at the Games. Three-time Olympian Hortense Diédhiou earned a continental quota spot from the African region, as the highest-ranked Senegalese judoka outside of direct qualifying position in the IJF World Ranking List of May 30, 2016.

Athlete	Event	Round of 32	Round of 16	Quarterfinals	Semifinals	Repechage	Final / BM	
Athlete	Event	Opposition Result	Opposition Result	Opposition Result	Opposition Result	Opposition Result	Opposition Result	Rank
Hortense Diédhiou	Women's −57 kg	Verhagen (NED); L 000–100	Did not advance					

== Swimming ==
Senegal has received a Universality invitation from FINA to send two swimmers (one male and one female) to the Olympics.

Athlete	Event	Heat		Semifinal		Final	
Athlete	Event	Time	Rank	Time	Rank	Time	Rank
Abdoul Niane	Men's 50 m freestyle	23.66	48	Did not advance			
Awa Ly N'diaye	Women's 50 m freestyle	DSQ		Did not advance			

== Taekwondo ==
Senegal entered one athlete into the taekwondo competition at the Olympics. Balla Dièye secured a spot in the men's lightweight category (68 kg) by virtue of his top two finish at the 2016 African Qualification Tournament in Agadir, Morocco.

Athlete	Event	Round of 16	Quarterfinals	Semifinals	Repechage	Final / BM	
Athlete	Event	Opposition Result	Opposition Result	Opposition Result	Opposition Result	Opposition Result	Rank
Balla Dièye	Men's −68 kg	Robak (POL); L 12–15	Did not advance				

== Wrestling ==
Senegal has qualified two wrestlers for the following weight classes into the Olympic competition, as a result of their semifinal triumphs at the 2016 African & Oceania Qualification Tournament.

Key:

- VT – Victory by Fall.
- PP – Decision by Points – the loser with technical points.
- PO – Decision by Points – the loser without technical points.
- ST – Technical superiority – the loser without technical points and a margin of victory of at least 8 (Greco-Roman) or 10 (freestyle) points.

Men's freestyle

Athlete	Event	Qualification	Round of 16	Quarterfinal	Semifinal	Repechage 1	Repechage 2	Final / BM	
Athlete	Event	Opposition Result	Opposition Result	Opposition Result	Opposition Result	Opposition Result	Opposition Result	Opposition Result	Rank
Adama Diatta	−57 kg	Erdenebat (MGL); W 3–1 ^{PP}	Bonne (CUB); L 1–3 ^{PP}	Did not advance					10

Women's freestyle

Athlete	Event	Qualification	Round of 16	Quarterfinal	Semifinal	Repechage 1	Repechage 2	Final / BM	
Athlete	Event	Opposition Result	Opposition Result	Opposition Result	Opposition Result	Opposition Result	Opposition Result	Opposition Result	Rank
Isabelle Sambou	−53 kg	Bye	Nguyễn (VIE); W 5–0 ^{VT}	Yoshida (JPN); L 0–3 ^{PO}	Did not advance	Bye	Synyshyn (AZE); L 0–3 ^{PO}	Did not advance	8
