= Bassirou Badji =

Senegalese basketball player

Bassirou Badji is a former Senegalese basketball player. Badji competed for Senegal at the 1980 Summer Olympics, where he scored 0 points in 6 games.
