= Yamar Samb =

Senegalese basketball player

Yamar Samb (born 24 September 1952) is a former Senegalese basketball player. Samb competed for Senegal at the 1980 Summer Olympics, where he scored 19 points and grabbed 6 rebounds in 6 games.
