= Igor Praporshchikov =

Australian wrestler

Personal information
- Nationality: Australian
- Born: 7 February 1976 (age 50) Odesa, Ukraine

Sport
- Sport: Freestyle wrestling, Greco-Roman wrestling, submission wrestling
Medal record
Representing Australia
Freestyle wrestling
Pacific Ocean Games
Gold medal – first place	1995 Cali	90kg
FILA Five Continents Cup
Silver medal – second place	1995 Sydney	85kg
Oceania Championship
Silver medal – second place	1995 Melbourne	82kg
Silver medal – second place	1996 Footscray	90kg
Gold medal – first place	1997 Mount Maunganui	76kg
Gold medal – first place	2000 Melbourne	85kg
Gold medal – first place	2002 Koror	96kg
Greco-Roman wrestling
Oceania Championship
Silver medal – second place	1996 Footscray	90kg
Bronze medal – third place	1997 Mount Maunganui	76kg
Submission wrestling
ADCC Asian and Oceanic Championship
Gold medal – first place	2008 Sydney	88kg
Gold medal – first place	2010 Sydney	99kg

Igor Praporshchikov (Ukrainian: Ігор Прапорщиків, romanized: Ihor Praporshchykiv; born 7 February 1976) is an Australian wrestler and coach. He competed in the men's freestyle 85 kg at the 2000 Summer Olympics. In freestyle, he won gold at the Pacific Ocean Games and Oceania Championship (1997, 2000, 2002), and silver at the FILA Five Continents Cup. In Greco-Roman, he won silver and bronze at the Oceania Championship (1996 and 1997 respectively).

Praporshchikov has also competed in submission wrestling, winning the ADCC Asian and Oceanic trials twice (2008, 2010) and going to the 2009 and 2011 World Championships. In 2019, he came third at the ADCC Australian National Titles in the men's professional -91kg division.

As a wrestling coach, Praporshchikov has trained UFC fighters Mark Hunt and Jamie Te Huna.

In October 2022, Praporshchikov was sentenced after several impaired driving offences.
