= Senegal at the Paralympics =

- IPC code: SEN
- NPC: Comité National Provisoire Handisport et Paralympique Sénégalais
- Medals: Gold 0 Silver 0 Bronze 0 Total 0

Summer appearances
- 2004; 2008; 2012; 2016; 2020; 2024

Senegal made its Paralympic Games début at the 2004 Summer Paralympics in Athens. The country sent just two athletes (one man and one woman) to compete in track and field. It returned in 2008, with the same combination.

Senegal has never taken part in the Winter Paralympics, and no Senegalese athlete has ever won a Paralympic medal.

Senegal took part in the 2012 Summer Paralympics, and the Comité National Provisoire Handisport et Paralympique Sénégalais chose Bedford as the UK training base for its Paralympians.

== Full results for Senegal at the Paralympics ==
Name	Games	Sport	Event	Result	Rank
Ousmane Ndong	2004 Athens	Athletics	Men's 100m T46	12.13	5th in heat 1; did not advance
Ousmane Ndong	2004 Athens	Athletics	Men's 200m T46	24.72	7th in heat 2; did not advance
Mada Sow	2004 Athens	Athletics	Women's 100m T54	19.94	6th in heat 2; did not advance
Dague Diop	2008 Beijing	Athletics	Women's 1,500m T54	4:18.54	7th in heat 1; did not advance
Dague Diop	2008 Beijing	Athletics	Women's 200m T54	disqualified	dq in heat 2; did not advance
Mor Ndiaye	2008 Beijing	Athletics	Men's javelin F57/58	39.42 m (836 points)	13th
Mor Ndiaye	2012 London	Athletics	Men's javelin F57/58	38.11 m (757 points)	12th
Youssoupha Diouf	2016 Rio	Athletics	Men's javelin F57	41.83 m	7th
Dague Diop	2016 Rio	Athletics	Women's shot put F56/F57	4.53 m	11th
Dague Diop	2016 Rio	Athletics	Women's shot put F57	9.59 m	13th
Ibrahima Seye Sen	2020 Tokyo	Taekwondo	Men's 75 kg	First round: L 19–38; Repechage: L 31–52	9th
Aliou Drame	2024 Paris	Archery	Men's individual compound	Ranking round: 572; Round of 32: L 131–136	28th in ranking round; Lost in round of 32
Youssoupha Diouf	2024 Paris	Athletics	Men's javelin F57	47.39	5th
Edmond Sanka	2024 Paris	Paracanoeing	Men's KL3	Heats: 42.77; Semifinal: 41.94; Final: 40.80	3rd in Heats; 3rd in Semifinal; 5th
Idrissa Keita	2024 Paris	Taekwondo	Men's +80 kg	Round of 16: W 6–4; Quarterfinal: L 0–16; Repechage: W 13–11; Bronze metal match: L 1–13	5th

== See also ==
- Senegal at the Olympics
