= Justin Abdou =

Canadian wrestler (born 1971)

Personal information
- Nationality: Canada
- Born: 18 January 1971 (age 55) Moose Jaw, Saskatchewan, Canada
- Height: 1.84 m (6 ft 0 in)
- Weight: 85 kg (187 lb)

Sport
- Sport: Wrestling
- Events: Freestyle and Folkstyle
- College team: Simon Fraser Red Leafs
- Club: Burnaby Mountain Wrestling Club
Medal record
Men's freestyle wrestling
Representing Canada
Pan American Championships
Silver medal – second place	1990 Colorado Springs	82 kg
Bronze medal – third place	2000 Cali	85 kg
Commonwealth Games
Gold medal – first place	1994 Victoria	82 kg
Collegiate Wrestling
Representing Simon Fraser
NAIA Championships
Gold medal – first place	1990 Hayes	177 lb
Gold medal – first place	1991 Butte	177 lb
Gold medal – first place	1992 Hays	177 lb
Gold medal – first place	1993 Butte	177 lb

Justin Abdou (born 18 January 1971) is a Canadian wrestler. He competed in the 2000 Summer Olympics in the men's freestyle 85 kg weight class.

As a member of the Simon Fraser University wrestling team, he won four NAIA titles at 177 pounds, while attaining a 204-22-2 record during his time at the school. Abdou is currently the head coach of the SFU men's and women wrestling teams.
