= Senegal at the 2020 Summer Olympics =

- IOC code: SEN
- NOC: Comité National Olympique et Sportif Sénégalais

in Tokyo, Japan July 23, 2021 – August 8, 2021
- Competitors: 9 in 8 sports
- Flag bearers (opening): Jeanne Boutbien; Mbagnick Ndiaye
- Flag bearer (closing): Adama Diatta
- Medals: Gold 0 Silver 0 Bronze 0 Total 0

Summer Olympics appearances (overview)
- 1964; 1968; 1972; 1976; 1980; 1984; 1988; 1992; 1996; 2000; 2004; 2008; 2012; 2016; 2020; 2024

Senegal competed at the 2020 Summer Olympics in Tokyo. Originally scheduled to take place from 24 July to 9 August 2020, the Games were postponed to 23 July to 8 August 2021, because of the COVID-19 pandemic. It was the nation's fifteenth consecutive appearance at the Summer Olympics.

== Competitors ==
The following is the list of number of competitors in the Games.

Sport	Men	Women	Total
Athletics	1	0	1
Canoeing	1	0	1
Fencing	0	1	1
Judo	1	0	1
Shooting	0	1	1
Swimming	1	1	2
Table tennis	1	0	1
Wrestling	1	0	1
Total	6	3	9

== Athletics ==
Senegal received a universality quota from the World Athletics to send a male track and field athlete.

Key

- Note–Ranks given for track events are within the athlete's heat only
- Q = Qualified for the next round
- q = Qualified for the next round as a fastest loser or, in field events, by position without achieving the qualifying target
- NR = National record
- N/A = Round not applicable for the event
- Bye = Athlete not required to compete in round

Track & road events

Athlete	Event	Heat		Semifinal		Final	
Athlete	Event	Result	Rank	Result	Rank	Result	Rank
Louis François Mendy	Men's 110 m hurdles	13.84 SB	7	Did not advance			

== Canoeing ==
=== Slalom ===
Senegalese canoeists qualified one boat through the 2021 African Canoe Slalom Championship in La Seu d'Urgell, Spain.

Athlete	Event	Preliminary						Semifinal		Final	
Athlete	Event	Run 1	Rank	Run 2	Rank	Best	Rank	Time	Rank	Time	Rank
Jean-Pierre Bourhis	Men's C-1	111.16	14	110.93	16	110.93	17	Did not advance			

== Fencing ==
Senegal entered one female fencer. Ndèye Binta Diongue earned a spot in the women's épée by winning the African Zonal Qualifier in Cairo, Egypt.

Athlete	Event	Round of 64	Round of 32	Round of 16	Quarterfinal	Semifinal	Final / BM	
Athlete	Event	Opposition Score	Opposition Score	Opposition Score	Opposition Score	Opposition Score	Opposition Score	Rank
Ndèye Binta Diongue	Women's épée	Bye	Lin S (CHN); L 6–15	Did not advance				

== Judo ==
Senegal qualified one judoka for the men's heavyweight event (+100 kg). 2019 African Games champion Mbagnick Ndiaye received a continental berth from Africa as the nation's top-ranked judoka, outside of a direct qualifying position in the IJF World Ranking List as of June 28, 2021.

Athlete	Event	Round of 32	Round of 16	Quarterfinals	Semifinals	Repechage	Final / BM	
Athlete	Event	Opposition Result	Opposition Result	Opposition Result	Opposition Result	Opposition Result	Opposition Result	Rank
Mbagnick Ndiaye	Men's +100 kg	Bye	Bashaev (ROC); L 00–10	Did not advance				

== Shooting ==
For the first time since Los Angeles 1984, Senegal received an invitation from ISSF to send Italian-born Chiara Costa in the women's skeet, if the minimum qualifying score (MQS) was fulfilled by June 6, 2021.

Athlete	Event	Qualification		Final	
Athlete	Event	Points	Rank	Points	Rank
Chiara Costa	Women's skeet	108	28	Did not advance	

== Swimming ==
Senegal received universality invitations from FINA to send two top-ranked swimmers (one per gender) in their respective individual events.

Athlete	Event	Heat		Semifinal		Final	
Athlete	Event	Time	Rank	Time	Rank	Time	Rank
Steven Aimable	Men's 100 m butterfly	53.64	49	Did not advance			
Jeanne Boutbien	Women's 100 m freestyle	59.27	46	Did not advance			

== Table tennis ==
Senegal qualified one male athlete. This marked the country's return to the sport for the first time in 16 years. Ibrahima Diaw claimed one of the four available spots at the 2020 African Olympic Qualification Tournament in Tunis, Tunisia.

Athlete	Event	Preliminary	Round 1	Round 2	Round 3	Round of 16	Quarterfinals	Semifinals	Final / BM	
Athlete	Event	Opposition Result	Opposition Result	Opposition Result	Opposition Result	Opposition Result	Opposition Result	Opposition Result	Opposition Result	Rank
Ibrahima Diaw	Men's singles	Bye	Chew (SGP); L 2–4	Did not advance						

== Wrestling ==
Senegal qualified one wrestler for the men's freestyle 65 kg event, by progressing to the final at the 2021 African & Oceania Qualification Tournament in Hammamet, Tunisia.

Key:

- VT (ranking points: 5–0 or 0–5) – Victory by fall.
- VB (ranking points: 5–0 or 0–5) – Victory by injury (VF for forfeit, VA for withdrawal or disqualification)
- PP (ranking points: 3–1 or 1–3) – Decision by points – the loser with technical points.
- PO (ranking points: 3–0 or 0–3) – Decision by points – the loser without technical points.
- ST (ranking points: 4–0 or 0–4) – Great superiority – the loser without technical points and a margin of victory of at least 8 (Greco-Roman) or 10 (freestyle) points.
- SP (ranking points: 4–1 or 1–4) – Technical superiority – the loser with technical points and a margin of victory of at least 8 (Greco-Roman) or 10 (freestyle) points.

Freestyle

Athlete	Event	Round of 16	Quarterfinal	Semifinal	Repechage	Final / BM	
Athlete	Event	Opposition Result	Opposition Result	Opposition Result	Opposition Result	Opposition Result	Rank
Adama Diatta	Men's −65 kg	Aliyev (AZE); L 0–3 ^{PO}	Did not advance		Niyazbekov (KAZ); L 0–4 ^{ST}	Did not advance	16
