= Mandiaye Ndiaye =

Senegalese basketball player

Madiagne Ndiaye (born 12 November 1952) is a former Senegalese basketball player with AS Forces Armées. Ndiaye competed for Senegal at the 1980 Summer Olympics, where he scored 25 points in 6 games.
