= Moussa M'Bengue =

Senegalese basketball player (born 1955)

Moussa M'Bengue (born 3 January 1955) is a former Senegalese basketball player. M'Bengue competed for Senegal at the 1980 Summer Olympics, where he scored 7 points in 6 games.
