= Modou Tall =

Senegalese basketball player

Modou Tall (born 27 June 1953) is a former Senegalese basketball player. Tall competed for Senegal at the 1980 Summer Olympics, where he scored 47 points in 6 games, including 18 points in a loss to Czechoslovakia.
