= Grégory Martinetti =

Swiss wrestler

Personal information
- Nationality: Swiss
- Born: 5 November 1972 (age 53)

Sport
- Sport: Wrestling

Grégory Martinetti (born 5 November 1972) is a Swiss wrestler. He competed in the men's freestyle 85 kg at the 2000 Summer Olympics.
