= Beibulat Musaev =

Belarusian freestyle wrestler

Medal record

Men's Freestyle wrestling

European Championships
Silver medal – second place	Budapest 2000	Freestyle 85 kg
Bronze medal – third place	Budapest 2001	Freestyle 85 kg
Silver medal – second place	Baku 2002	Freestyle 84 kg

Beibulat Musaev (born August 8, 1977) is a wrestler from Belarus, who competed in the 2000 Summer Olympics, where he placed 9th. Musaev made it to the bronze medal match of the 2001 World Wrestling Championships.
