= Charles Burton (wrestler) =

American wrestler

Personal information
- Born: October 9, 1973 (age 52) Ontario, Oregon, U.S.

Sport
- Sport: Wrestling
- Events: Freestyle and Folkstyle
Medal record
Men's freestyle wrestling
Representing the United States
Pan American Championships
| Silver medal – second place | 2000 Cali | 85 kg |
| Bronze medal – third place | 1997 San Juan | 76 kg |
Collegiate Wrestling
Representing the Boise State Broncos
NCAA Division I Championships
| Bronze medal – third place | 1996 Minneapolis | 167 lb |

Charles Burton (born October 9, 1973) is an American wrestler. He competed in the men's freestyle 85 kg at the 2000 Summer Olympics.
