= Omar Dia =

Senegalese basketball player

Omar Dia (born 1 January 1955) is a former Senegalese basketball player. Dia competed for Senegal at the 1980 Summer Olympics, where he scored 108 points, grabbed 32 rebounds and had 22 assists in 6 games, including a 27 points, 12 rebounds and 4 assists in a loss to Czechoslovakia.
