= Ndèye Binta Diongue =

Senegalese fencer (born 1988)

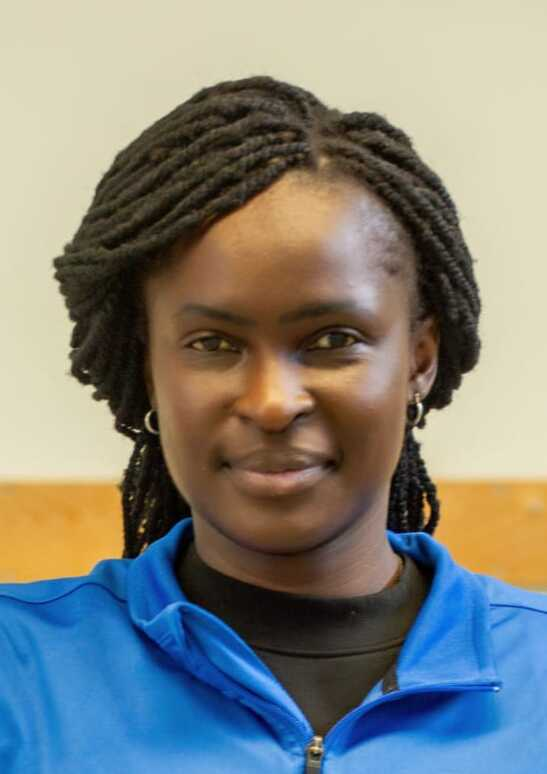

Personal information
- Nationality: Senegalese
- Born: 2 May 1988 (age 36)

Sport
- Country: Senegal
- Sport: Fencing

Ndèye Binta Diongue (born 2 May 1988) is a Senegalese épée fencer. She competed in the 2020 Summer Olympics held in Tokyo, Japan.
