= Nafi Toure =

Senegalese fencer

Personal information
- Born: 6 September 1971 (age 54) Tambacounda, Senegal

Sport
- Sport: Fencing

Nafi Toure (born 6 September 1971) is a Senegalese fencer. She competed in the women's individual sabre events at the 2004 and 2008 Summer Olympics.
