= Ibrahima Tamba =

Senegalese sprinter

Personal information
- Nationality: Senegalese
- Born: 1 January 1967 (age 59)

Sport
- Sport: Sprinting
- Event: 200 metres
Medal record
Men's athletics
Representing Senegal
African Championships
| Silver medal – second place | 1992 Belle Vue Harel | 4×400 m |
| Bronze medal – third place | 1988 Annaba | 4×100 m |

Ibrahima Tamba (born 1 January 1967) is a Senegalese sprinter. He competed in the 200 metres at the 1988 Summer Olympics and the 1992 Summer Olympics.
