= Aly Attyé =

Senegalese judoka

Personal information
- Nationality: Senegalese
- Born: 29 January 1964 (age 61)

Sport
- Sport: Judo

Aly Attyé (born 29 January 1964) is a Senegalese judoka. He competed at the 1988 Summer Olympics and the 1992 Summer Olympics.
