= Bruno N'Diaye =

Senegalese swimmer

Personal information
- Born: 5 March 1969 (age 57)

Sport
- Sport: Swimming

Bruno N'Diaye (born 5 March 1969) is a Senegalese swimmer. He competed at the 1988 Summer Olympics and the 1992 Summer Olympics.
