= Alioune Diouf =

Senegalese wrestler (born 1966)

Personal information
- Nationality: Senegalese
- Born: 15 November 1966 (age 59)
- Height: 182 cm (6 ft 0 in)

Sport
- Country: Senegal
- Sport: Freestyle wrestling Greco-Roman wrestling
- Weight class: 82–100 kg (181–220 lb)

Alioune Diouf (born 15 November 1966) is a Senegalese wrestler. He competed at the 1992 Summer Olympics (freestyle 100 kg and Greco-Roman 100 kg), the 1996 Summer Olympics (freestyle 82 kg), and the 2000 Summer Olympics (freestyle 85 kg).
