= Momar N'Dao =

Senegalese sprinter

Personal information
- Nationality: Senegalese
- Born: 21 March 1949 (age 77)

Sport
- Sport: Sprinting
- Event: 100 metres
Medal record
Men's athletics
Representing Senegal
African Championships
Silver medal – second place	1979 Dakar	4×100 m

Momar N'Dao (born 21 March 1949) is a Senegalese sprinter. He competed in the 100 metres at the 1976 Summer Olympics and the 1980 Summer Olympics.
