= Murder of Oumar Dia =

1997 murder in Denver, Colorado, United States

- Date: November 18, 1997
- Location: Denver, Colorado, United States
- Type: Homicide by shooting
- Participants: Nathan Thill and Jeremiah Barnum (shooters)
- Deaths: Oumar Dia
- Injuries: Jeannie VanVelkenburg (witness)

On November 18, 1997, Oumar Dia a 38-year-old Mauritanian man was approached by white supremacist Nathan Thill at a bus stop and was shot dead. Thill's accomplice, Jeremiah Barnum, also shot and injured witness Jeannie VanVelkenburg, who was left paralyzed after she ran to aid Dia. She committed suicide by overdosing on painkillers in 2002.

== Incident ==
Oumar Dia was a father of three who lived in Mauritania until 1989. Dia's family remained in Africa while he lived in the United States. On November 18, 1997, Dia was waiting at a bus stop after working a shift as a housekeeper at a hotel. According to testimony, Nathan Thill stated "[I] walked through town with my gun in my waist, saw the black guy and thought he didn't belong where he was at". Thill then said that he thought to himself "How easy it would be to take him out right there, ... Didn't seem like much to me." Thill and his accomplice Jeremiah Barnum then approached Dia, asked him if he was prepared to die and began to beat him while calling him racial slurs. Nurse aide Jeannie VanVelkenburg attempted to intervene, telling the two to stop assaulting Dia. Thill then shot Dia three times in the neck and chest. VanVelkenburg was then shot in the spine while fleeing by Barnum, leaving her permanently paralyzed. After his arrest, Thill explained his reason for killing Dia was his black skin, stating "In a war, anybody wearing the enemy's uniform is an enemy and should be taken out, ... I guess I was kind of thinking about him because he was black."

== Trials ==
Nathan Thill described himself as a soldier in a race war and admitted to killing Dia. The prosecution sought the death penalty. The first trial for Thill resulted with a hung jury. In December 1999, Thill pleaded guilty to first degree murder in exchange for a life sentence. Prior to sentencing, Thill said, "I grudgingly accept my life sentence . . . in order to slap the prosecution in their faces. They had the cards stacked in their favor."

Jeremiah Barnum faced a mandatory life sentence, albeit he later made a plea deal that resulted with him being imprisoned for only seven years; from 2002 to 2009. Barnum was shot and killed during an altercation with the police in 2012. The police opened fire on Barnum when he reached for a pistol.

== Response ==
Protests occurred in the Denver area following the killing while some African American residents reported feelings of fear due to other recent incidents of racial violence occurring in Colorado. President of the United States Bill Clinton visited Colorado in response to the racial violence occurring in the state at the time. Following the incident, a paralyzed VanVelkinburgh stated, "I was trying to help someone who needed help and didn't have any idea I would end up in this situation, ... But I would do it again if I thought there was a chance that I could save someone's life." She committed suicide by overdosing on painkillers in 2002.
