= Mouhamed Diop (swimmer) =

Senegalese swimmer

Personal information
- Born: 21 June 1964 (age 62)

Sport
- Sport: Swimming

Mouhamedou Diop (born 21 June 1964) is a Senegalese swimmer. He competed at the 1988 Summer Olympics and the 1992 Summer Olympics.
