= Hortense Diédhiou =

Senegalese judoka (born 1983)

Personal information
- Born: August 19, 1983 (age 42) Ziguinchor, Senegal
- Occupation: Judoka
- Height: 1.65 m (5 ft 5 in)
- Weight: 57 kg (126 lb)

Sport
- Country: Senegal
- Sport: Judo
- Event: -57kg
Medal record
Women's Judo
Representing Senegal
All-Africa Games
| Gold medal – first place | 2007 Algiers | -52 kg |
| Silver medal – second place | 2011 Maputo | -57 kg |

Profile at external databases
- JudoInside.com: 27496
- Updated on 30 July 2012

Hortense (also spelled Hortance, Hortence and Hortanse) Diédhiou (born 19 August 1983) is a Senegalese judoka. She participated in three Olympic games: 2004 in the -52kg event, 2008 at -52kg and 2012 at -57kg. She was the flag bearer of Senegal at the 2012 Summer Olympics opening ceremony. At the 2004 Olympics, she met Frédérique Jossinet who invited her to train in France. Following that recommendation Diédhiou moved to Provence and in 2011 to Paris.
