= Senegalese National Olympic and Sports Committee =

National Olympic Committee of Senegal

- Country: Senegal
- [[|]]
- Code: SEN
- Recognized: 1963
- Continental Association: ANOCA
- President: Mamadou D.Ndiaye
- Secretary General: Seydina Omar Diagne
- Website: cnoss.sn

The Senegalese National Olympic and Sports Committee (French: Comité National Olympique et Sportif Sénégalais) (IOC code: SEN) is the National Olympic Committee representing Senegal.
