= 2003 World Wrestling Championships – Men's freestyle 84 kg =

Men's freestyle 84 kg at the 2003 World Championships
- Venue: Madison Square Garden
- Dates: 12–14 September 2003
- Competitors: 36 from 36 nations

Medalists
gold medal	Sazhid Sazhidov	Russia
silver medal	Cael Sanderson	United States
bronze medal	Oleksandr Zakharuk	Georgia

The men's freestyle 84 kilograms is a competition featured at the 2003 World Wrestling Championships, and was held at the Madison Square Garden in New York, United States from 12 to 14 September 2003.

== Results ==
=== Preliminary round ===
==== Pool 1 ====
Pos	Athlete	Pld	W	L	CP	TP	KAZ	JPN	ISR
1	Magomed Kurugliyev (KAZ)	2	2	0	7	15	—	3–1	12–0
2	Hidekazu Yokoyama (JPN)	2	1	1	4	5	1–3 PP	—	4–0
3	Sergey Kolesnikov (ISR)	2	0	2	0	0	0–4 ST	0–3 PO	—

Source: Official website

==== Pool 2 ====
Pos	Athlete	Pld	W	L	CP	TP	ROM	CHN	CAN
1	Nicolae Ghiță (ROM)	2	1	1	5	20	—	12–1	8–13
2	Man Dula (CHN)	2	1	1	4	13	1–4 SP	—	12–3
3	Carl Rainville (CAN)	2	1	1	4	16	3–1 PP	1–3 PP	—

Source: Official website

==== Pool 3 ====
Pos	Athlete	Pld	W	L	CP	TP	BLR	AUS	TPE
1	Siarhei Borchanka (BLR)	2	2	0	8	33	—	11–0	22–0
2	Rein Ozoline (AUS)	2	1	1	4	4	0–4 ST	—	4–0 Fall
3	Chen Te-hao (TPE)	2	0	2	0	0	0–4 ST	0–4 TO	—

Source: Official website

==== Pool 4 ====
Pos	Athlete	Pld	W	L	CP	TP	FRA	SVK	GUM
1	Vincent Aka-Akesse (FRA)	2	2	0	7	38	—	7–5	31–0 Fall
2	Peter Lapšanský (SVK)	2	1	1	5	32	1–3 PP	—	27–0
3	Jeff Cobb (GUM)	2	0	2	0	0	0–4 TO	0–4 ST	—

Source: Official website

==== Pool 5 ====
Pos	Athlete	Pld	W	L	CP	TP	RUS	BUL	MGL
1	Sazhid Sazhidov (RUS)	2	2	0	7	18	—	10–0	8–2
2	Arkadiy Tzopa (BUL)	2	1	1	3	4	0–4 ST	—	4–0
3	Buyandelgeriin Batbayar (MGL)	2	0	2	1	2	1–3 PP	0–3 PO	—

Source: Official website

==== Pool 6 ====
Pos	Athlete	Pld	W	L	CP	TP	KOR	ITA	SEN
1	Moon Eui-jae (KOR)	2	2	0	7	18	—	7–4	11–0 Fall
2	Anthony Fasugba (ITA)	2	1	1	4	8	1–3 PP	—	4–1
3	Matar Sène (SEN)	2	0	2	1	1	0–4 TO	1–3 PP	—

Source: Official website

==== Pool 7 ====
Pos	Athlete	Pld	W	L	CP	TP	MKD	HUN	IND
1	Magomed Ibragimov (MKD)	2	2	0	6	12	—	7–3	5–2
2	Gergely Kiss (HUN)	2	1	1	4	9	1–3 PP	—	6–3
3	Anuj Chaudhary (IND)	2	0	2	2	5	1–3 PP	1–3 PP	—

Source: Official website

==== Pool 8 ====
Pos	Athlete	Pld	W	L	CP	TP	CUB	POL	SUI
1	Yoel Romero (CUB)	2	2	0	6	15	—	6–5	9–0
2	Marcin Jurecki (POL)	2	1	1	4	10	1–3 PP	—	5–0
3	Thomas Bucheli (SUI)	2	0	2	0	0	0–3 PO	0–3 PO	—

Source: Official website

==== Pool 9 ====
Pos	Athlete	Pld	W	L	CP	TP	ARM	GER	PUR
1	Mamed Aghaev (ARM)	2	2	0	7	15	—	3–1	12–0
2	André Backhaus (GER)	2	1	1	4	10	1–3 PP	—	9–6
3	Matt White (PUR)	2	0	2	1	6	0–4 ST	1–3 PP	—

Source: Official website

==== Pool 10 ====
Pos	Athlete	Pld	W	L	CP	TP	USA	IRI	FIN
1	Cael Sanderson (USA)	2	2	0	6	12	—	8–2	4–0
2	Majid Khodaei (IRI)	2	1	1	4	9	1–3 PP	—	7–0
3	Tero Perkkiö (FIN)	2	0	2	0	0	0–3 PO	0–3 PO	—

Source: Official website

==== Pool 11 ====
Pos	Athlete	Pld	W	L	CP	TP	GEO	GRE	KGZ
1	Revaz Mindorashvili (GEO)	2	2	0	7	15	—	3–0	12–0
2	Lazaros Loizidis (GRE)	2	1	1	4	11	0–3 PO	—	11–0
3	Almazbek Ergeshov (KGZ)	2	0	2	0	0	0–4 ST	0–4 ST	—

Source: Official website

==== Pool 12 ====
Pos	Athlete	Pld	W	L	CP	TP	TUR	UKR	BRA
1	Gökhan Yavaşer (TUR)	2	2	0	7	14	—	3–2	11–1
2	Alik Muzaiev (UKR)	2	1	1	4	9	1–3 PP	—	7–0
3	Adrian Jaoude (BRA)	2	0	2	1	1	1–4 SP	0–3 PO	—

Source: Official website

=== Knockout round ===
Round of 16
Magomed Kurugliyev (KAZ)	8
Nicolae Ghiță (ROM)	5
Siarhei Borchanka (BLR)	4
Vincent Aka-Akesse (FRA)	2
Sazhid Sazhidov (RUS)	3
Moon Eui-jae (KOR)	0
Magomed Ibragimov (MKD)	0
Yoel Romero (CUB)	3

Quarterfinals
Magomed Kurugliyev (KAZ)	2
Siarhei Borchanka (BLR)	3
Sazhid Sazhidov (RUS)	3
Yoel Romero (CUB)	0
Mamed Aghaev (ARM)	0
Cael Sanderson (USA)	3
Revaz Mindorashvili (GEO)	4
Gökhan Yavaşer (TUR)	1

Semifinals
Siarhei Borchanka (BLR)	2
Sazhid Sazhidov (RUS)	5
Cael Sanderson (USA)	4
Revaz Mindorashvili (GEO)	2

Final
Sazhid Sazhidov (RUS)	4
Cael Sanderson (USA)	3
Bronze medal match
Siarhei Borchanka (BLR)	2
Revaz Mindorashvili (GEO)	6
