= Wrestling at the 2004 Summer Olympics – Men's freestyle 84 kg =

Men's freestyle 84 kg at the Games of the XXVIII Olympiad
- Venue: Ano Liosia Olympic Hall
- Date: 27–28 August 2004
- Competitors: 22 from 22 nations

Medalists
1st place, gold medalist(s)		Cael Sanderson	United States
2nd place, silver medalist(s)		Moon Eui-jae	South Korea
3rd place, bronze medalist(s)		Sazhid Sazhidov	Russia

The men's freestyle 84 kilograms at the 2004 Summer Olympics as part of the wrestling program were held at the Ano Liosia Olympic Hall, August 27 to August 28.

The competition held with an elimination system of three or four wrestlers in each pool, with the winners qualify for the quarterfinals, semifinals and final by way of direct elimination.

== Schedule ==
All times are Eastern European Summer Time (UTC+03:00)

Date	Time	Event
27 August 2004	09:30	Round 1
27 August 2004	09:30	Round 2
27 August 2004	17:30	Round 3
27 August 2004	17:30	Qualification
28 August 2004	09:30	Semifinals
28 August 2004	17:30	Finals

== Results ==
Legend

- WO — Won by walkover

=== Elimination pools ===
==== Pool 1 ====
Pos	Athlete	Pld	W	L	CP	TP	Qualification
1	Majid Khodaei (IRI)	2	2	0	6	13	Knockout round
2	Hidekazu Yokoyama (JPN)	2	1	1	4	12	
3	Anuj Chaudhary (IND)	2	0	2	2	6	

Source: Official website

	Score		CP
Majid Khodaei (IRI)	5–1	Anuj Chaudhary (IND)	3–1 PP
Hidekazu Yokoyama (JPN)	1–8	Majid Khodaei (IRI)	1–3 PP
Anuj Chaudhary (IND)	5–11	Hidekazu Yokoyama (JPN)	1–3 PP

==== Pool 2 ====
Pos	Athlete	Pld	W	L	CP	TP	Qualification
1	Cael Sanderson (USA)	2	2	0	6	13	Knockout round
2	Siarhei Borchanka (BLR)	2	1	1	4	3	
3	Magomed Kurugliyev (KAZ)	2	0	2	2	3	

Source: Official website

	Score		CP
Magomed Kurugliyev (KAZ)	1–2	Siarhei Borchanka (BLR)	1–3 PP
Cael Sanderson (USA)	4–2	Magomed Kurugliyev (KAZ)	3–1 PP
Siarhei Borchanka (BLR)	1–9	Cael Sanderson (USA)	1–3 PP

==== Pool 3 ====
Pos	Athlete	Pld	W	L	CP	TP	Qualification
1	Lazaros Loizidis (GRE)	2	2	0	6	6	Knockout round
2	Revaz Mindorashvili (GEO)	2	1	1	4	4	
3	Vincent Aka-Akesse (FRA)	2	0	2	0	0	

Source: Official website

	Score		CP
Revaz Mindorashvili (GEO)	1–3	Lazaros Loizidis (GRE)	1–3 PP
Vincent Aka-Akesse (FRA)	0–3	Revaz Mindorashvili (GEO)	0–3 PO
Lazaros Loizidis (GRE)	3–0	Vincent Aka-Akesse (FRA)	3–0 PO

==== Pool 4 ====
Pos	Athlete	Pld	W	L	CP	TP	Qualification
1	Yoel Romero (CUB)	2	2	0	7	13	Knockout round
2	Davyd Bichinashvili (GER)	2	1	1	4	10	
3	Jeff Cobb (GUM)	2	0	2	0	0	

Source: Official website

	Score		CP
Jeff Cobb (GUM)	0–10	Davyd Bichinashvili (GER)	0–4 ST
Yoel Romero (CUB)	10–0	Jeff Cobb (GUM)	4–0 ST
Davyd Bichinashvili (GER)	0–3	Yoel Romero (CUB)	0–3 PO

==== Pool 5 ====
Pos	Athlete	Pld	W	L	CP	TP	Qualification
1	Taras Danko (UKR)	2	2	0	7	9	Knockout round
2	Gökhan Yavaşer (TUR)	2	1	1	4	0	
3	Mamed Aghaev (ARM)	2	0	2	0	0	

Source: Official website

	Score		CP
Taras Danko (UKR)	3–0	Mamed Aghaev (ARM)	4–0 EV
Gökhan Yavaşer (TUR)	0–6	Taras Danko (UKR)	0–3 PO
Mamed Aghaev (ARM)	WO	Gökhan Yavaşer (TUR)	0–4 EV

==== Pool 6 ====
Pos	Athlete	Pld	W	L	CP	TP	Qualification
1	Moon Eui-jae (KOR)	2	2	0	6	13	Knockout round
2	Miroslav Gochev (BUL)	2	1	1	4	9	
3	Magomed Ibragimov (MKD)	2	0	2	1	2	

Source: Official website

	Score		CP
Magomed Ibragimov (MKD)	0–4	Moon Eui-jae (KOR)	0–3 PO
Miroslav Gochev (BUL)	4–2	Magomed Ibragimov (MKD)	3–1 PP
Moon Eui-jae (KOR)	9–5	Miroslav Gochev (BUL)	3–1 PP

==== Pool 7 ====
Pos	Athlete	Pld	W	L	CP	TP	Qualification
1	Sazhid Sazhidov (RUS)	3	3	0	11	32	Knockout round
2	Shamil Aliev (TJK)	3	2	1	6	10	
3	Nicolae Ghiță (ROM)	3	1	2	4	16	
4	Matar Sène (SEN)	3	0	3	2	6	

Source: Official website

	Score		CP
Sazhid Sazhidov (RUS)	17–0	Matar Sène (SEN)	4–0 ST
Nicolae Ghiță (ROM)	3–4	Shamil Aliev (TJK)	1–3 PP
Sazhid Sazhidov (RUS)	10–2 Fall	Nicolae Ghiță (ROM)	4–0 TO
Matar Sène (SEN)	3–6	Shamil Aliev (TJK)	1–3 PP
Sazhid Sazhidov (RUS)	5–0	Shamil Aliev (TJK)	3–0 PO
Matar Sène (SEN)	3–11	Nicolae Ghiță (ROM)	1–3 PP

=== Knockout round ===
Qualification
Majid Khodaei (IRI)	5
Cael Sanderson (USA)	6
Lazaros Loizidis (GRE)	1
Yoel Romero (CUB)	3
Taras Danko (UKR)	1
Moon Eui-jae (KOR)	3

Semifinals
Cael Sanderson (USA)	3
Yoel Romero (CUB)	2
Moon Eui-jae (KOR)	10
Sazhid Sazhidov (RUS)	2

Gold medal match
Cael Sanderson (USA)	3
Moon Eui-jae (KOR)	1
Bronze medal match
Yoel Romero (CUB)	3
Sazhid Sazhidov (RUS)	5

Classification 5–6
Majid Khodaei (IRI)	3
Lazaros Loizidis (GRE)	0

== Final standing ==
Rank	Athlete
1st place, gold medalist(s)	Cael Sanderson (USA)
2nd place, silver medalist(s)	Moon Eui-jae (KOR)
3rd place, bronze medalist(s)	Sazhid Sazhidov (RUS)
4	Yoel Romero (CUB)
5	Majid Khodaei (IRI)
6	Lazaros Loizidis (GRE)
7	Taras Danko (UKR)
8	Shamil Aliev (TJK)
9	Nicolae Ghiță (ROM)
10	Hidekazu Yokoyama (JPN)
11	Davyd Bichinashvili (GER)
12	Miroslav Gochev (BUL)
13	Revaz Mindorashvili (GEO)
14	Siarhei Borchanka (BLR)
15	Gökhan Yavaşer (TUR)
16	Anuj Chaudhary (IND)
17	Matar Sène (SEN)
18	Magomed Kurugliyev (KAZ)
19	Magomed Ibragimov (MKD)
20	Vincent Aka-Akesse (FRA)
21	Jeff Cobb (GUM)
DQ	Mamed Aghaev (ARM)

- Mamed Aghaev was ejected from the competition for unsportsmanlike conduct following his protest at the end of his first round bout against Danko.
