= Shamil Aliev =

Tajikistani wrestler

Personal information
- Full name: Shamil Alievich Aliev
- Nationality: Russia; Tajikistan
- Born: 9 September 1979 (age 46) Makhachkala, Russian SFSR, Soviet Union
- Height: 1.73 m (5 ft 8 in)
- Weight: 84 kg (185 lb)

Sport
- Style: Freestyle
- Club: Trade Union Sports Club
Medal record
Men's freestyle wrestling
Representing Tajikistan
Asian Games
Bronze medal – third place	2002 Busan	84 kg
Asian Championships
Silver medal – second place	2003 New Delhi	84 kg

Shamil Alievich Aliev (Russian: Шамиль Алиевич Алиев; born September 9, 1979, in Makhachkala, Russian SFSR) is a retired amateur Tajik freestyle wrestler, who competed in the men's light heavyweight category. Representing his naturalized nation Tajikistan, Aliev won a bronze medal in the 84-kg division at the 2002 Asian Games in Busan, South Korea, scored a silver at the 2003 Asian Wrestling Championships in New Delhi, India, and then finished eighth at the 2004 Summer Olympics. Aliev is also a member of the wrestling team for Trade Union Sports Club in Makhachkala, before competing for the Tajik squad in 2002.

Aliev reached sporting headlines at the 2002 Asian Games in Busan, South Korea, where he picked up a bronze medal over neighboring Uzbekistan's Aslan Sanakoev in the men's light heavyweight category (84 kg) with a 3–1 decision. A year later, he captured a silver at the 2003 Asian Wrestling Championships in Delhi, India, losing 2–3 to Iran's Pejman Dorostkar.

At the 2004 Summer Olympics in Athens, Aliev qualified for his naturalized Tajik squad in the men's 84 kg class. Earlier in the process, he placed second and guaranteed a spot on the Tajik wrestling team from the Olympic Qualification Tournament in Sofia, Bulgaria. Aliev started the four-man prelim pool with a pair of marvelous victories over four-time Olympic veteran Nicolae Ghiţă of Romania (3–4) and Senegal's Matar Sène (3–6), before being edged out by Russia's Sazhid Sazhidov in a more complacent 5–0 decision. Placing second in the pool and eighth overall, Aliev's performance was not enough to advance him to the quarterfinals.
