= Thoroughly Modern Millie =

1967 film by George Roy Hill

- Theatrical release poster
- Directed by: George Roy Hill
- Screenplay by: Richard Morris
- Based on: Chrysanthemum by: Robin Chancellor; Neville Phillips; Robb Stewart
- Produced by: Ross Hunter
- Starring: Julie Andrews; Mary Tyler Moore; Carol Channing; James Fox; John Gavin; Beatrice Lillie
- Cinematography: Russell Metty
- Edited by: Stuart Gilmore
- Music by: Elmer Bernstein
- Production company: Ross Hunter Productions
- Distributed by: Universal Pictures
- Release date: March 21, 1967
- Running time: 151 minutes
- Country: United States
- Language: English
- Budget: $6 million
- Box office: $40 million

Thoroughly Modern Millie is a 1967 American musical romantic comedy film directed by George Roy Hill and starring Julie Andrews. The screenplay by Richard Morris, based on the 1956 British musical Chrysanthemum, follows a naïve young woman who finds herself in a series of madcap adventures when she sets her sights on marrying her wealthy boss. The film also stars Mary Tyler Moore, Carol Channing, James Fox, John Gavin, and Beatrice Lillie.

The soundtrack interpolates new songs by Jimmy Van Heusen and Sammy Cahn ("Thoroughly Modern Millie", "The Tapioca"), and Jay Thompson ("Jimmy") with standard songs from the 1910s and 1920s, including "Baby Face" and "Jazz Baby". For use of the latter, the producers had to acquire the rights from General Mills, which had used the melody with various lyrics to promote Wheaties for more than 40 years.

The film was nominated for seven Academy Awards and five Golden Globe Awards. It became the eighth highest-grossing film of 1967 in North America. In 2000, it was adapted into a stage musical of the same name.

== Plot ==
In the New York City of 1922, flapper Millie Dillmount is determined to find work as a stenographer to a wealthy businessman and then marry him—a "thoroughly modern" goal. Millie befriends the sweet yet naive Miss Dorothy Brown as the latter checks into the Priscilla Hotel. When housemother Mrs. Meers learns that Miss Dorothy is an orphan, she remarks: "Sad to be all alone in the world." Unbeknownst to Millie, Mrs. Meers sells her tenants into white slavery. Those without family or close friends are primary targets.

At a Friendship Dance in the dining hall, Millie meets devil-may-care paperclip salesman Jimmy Smith, to whom she takes an instant liking. However, she carries on with her plan to work for and then marry a rich man, and when she lands a job at Sincere Trust, she sets her sights on the attractive but self-absorbed Trevor Graydon. Jimmy later takes her and Miss Dorothy on an outing to Long Island, where they meet eccentric widow Muzzy Van Hossmere. Jimmy tells the girls that his father was Muzzy's former gardener. Millie begins to fall for Jimmy, but then she sees him summon Miss Dorothy from her room for a late-night rendezvous, and assumes the worst.

Millie is even more determined to stick to her plan and marry Trevor. One morning, she goes to work dressed as a flapper and attempts to seduce him, but her effort fails. Eventually, Trevor meets Miss Dorothy and falls in love with her, and vice versa, leaving Millie heartbroken. Meanwhile, Jimmy's attempts to talk to Millie are continually thwarted by no-nonsense head stenographer Miss Flannery. He eventually climbs up the side of the building and when he finally manages to talk to Millie, she tells him that she is quitting her job as Mr. Graydon is no longer available.

Mrs. Meers makes several attempts to kidnap Miss Dorothy and hand her over to her Chinese henchmen, but Millie unwittingly disrupts her every time. When Mrs. Meers finally succeeds, Millie finds Trevor drowning his sorrows, and he tells her that Miss Dorothy stood him up and checked out of the hotel. Jimmy climbs into Miss Dorothy's room, lets Millie in, and they find all of Miss Dorothy's possessions still there. Millie realizes that Miss Dorothy is just one of several girls who have vanished without a word to anyone, except to Mrs. Meers. Together with Trevor Graydon, they try to piece the puzzle together. When Jimmy asks what all the missing girls had in common, Millie mentions that they were all orphans.

Jimmy disguises himself as a woman named Mary James seeking accommodations at the Priscilla Hotel, and "casually" mentions to Mrs. Meers that she is an orphan. Mrs. Meers spots Trevor sitting in his car in front of the hotel, becomes suspicious, and shoots him with a tranquilizer dart. Mary James is subsequently captured by Mrs. Meers and her henchmen, and Millie follows them to Chinatown, where the unconscious Jimmy has been hidden in a room in a fireworks factory where Miss Dorothy is sleeping. Trying to look casual, Millie smokes a cigarette outside the building, and when she begins to choke on it, she tosses it into a window, setting off the fireworks. As a series of explosions tear through the building, Millie dashes into the factory and finds several girls tied up, about to be sent off to Beijing. She unties a couple of them, who then free the others, and then bumps into Miss Dorothy. They carry Jimmy out of the building and head for Muzzy's mansion on Long Island.

Mrs. Meers and the others follow Millie and the gang, but under Muzzy's leadership, everyone manages to subdue the nefarious trio. Millie then discovers that Jimmy (whose real name is James Van Hossmere) and Miss Dorothy are actually millionaire siblings and that Muzzy is their stepmother who sent them out into the world to find partners who would love them for who they were and not for their money. After consulting with Tea, Muzzy's butler, who raised Jimmy, Millie marries Jimmy, Miss Dorothy marries Trevor, and Muzzy marries one of her instructors.

== Cast ==
- Julie Andrews as Millie Dillmount
- James Fox as Jimmy Smith/James Van Hossmere
- Mary Tyler Moore as Miss Dorothy Brown
- Carol Channing as Muzzy Van Hossmere
- John Gavin as Trevor Graydon
- Beatrice Lillie as Mrs. Meers
- Jack Soo as Oriental No. 1
- Pat Morita as Oriental No. 2
- Philip Ahn as Tea, Muzzy's head butler
- Lisabeth Hush as Judith Tremaine
- Cavada Humphrey as Miss Flannery
- Ann Dee as singer ("Rose of Washington Square")
- Jimmy Bryant provided the singing voice of Jimmy Smith/James Van Hossmere

== Production ==
Ross Hunter wanted to make a film of The Boy Friend, which had been a success on stage with Julie Andrews. Film rights cost too much—$400,000—so Hunter decided to do "his own". He managed to get Andrews to agree to star.

Although Pat Morita and Jack Soo each play Chinese henchmen, both were of Japanese descent; Morita was born in California, and Soo was born on a ship in the Pacific Ocean headed to the United States. While he received no screen credit, Jimmy Bryant provided the singing voice for James Fox in this film.

According to Andrews, the film's producers at Universal sought to maximize financial returns by having a roadshow theatrical release and refused to make the artistic cuts desired by director Hill, causing Hill to quit before the film was scored and finished.

== Music ==
Elmer Bernstein composed the incidental score, for which he won his only Academy Award. The songs were arranged and conducted by André Previn.

Act 1

- "Prelude: Thoroughly Modern Millie" – Julie Andrews
  - Music by Jimmy Van Heusen and lyrics by Sammy Cahn
- "Overture: (A) Baby Face (B) Do It Again (C) Poor Butterfly (D) Stumbling (E) Japanese Sandman – Orchestra
  - Stumbling: Composed by Zez Confrey
- "Jimmy" – Julie Andrews
  - Music and lyrics by Jay Thompson
- "The Tapioca" – Julie Andrews, James Fox
  - Music by Jimmy Van Heusen and lyrics by Sammy Cahn
- "Jazz Baby" – Carol Channing
- "Jewish Wedding Song (Trinkt Le Chaim)" – Julie Andrews

Act 2

- "Intermission Melody: (A) Thoroughly Modern Millie (B) Jimmy (C) Jewish Wedding Song (D) Baby Face – Julie Andrews
- "Poor Butterfly" – Julie Andrews, John Gavin
- "Rose of Washington Square" – Ann Dee
  - Composed by James F. Hanley
- "Baby Face" – Julie Andrews
- "Do It Again!" – Carol Channing
- "Reprise: Thoroughly Modern Millie" – Julie Andrews
- "Exit Music: (A) Jazz Baby (B) Jimmy (C) Thoroughly Modern Millie" – Orchestra

== Reception ==
=== Box office ===
The film earned $8.5 million in rentals in North America during 1967. At this time, Julie Andrews was the number-one box office star in motion pictures. Thoroughly Modern Millie was her last hit film of the 1960s; following the box office failure of her next two films, Star! (1968) and Darling Lili (1970), Andrews did not star in another film until The Tamarind Seed in 1974.

=== Critical response ===
The film opened to good reviews and good box office. Bosley Crowther of The New York Times called the film "a thoroughly delightful movie", "a kidding satire, in a rollicking song-and-dance vein", "a joyously syncopated frolic", and "a romantic-melodramatic fable that makes clichés sparkle like jewels". He added, "Miss Andrews is absolutely darling – deliciously spirited and dry ... Having had previous experience at this sort of Jazz-age hyperbole in the British musical, The Boy Friend ... she knows how to hit the right expressions of maidenly surprise and dismay, the right taps in a flow of nimble dances, and the right notes in a flood of icky songs." He concluded "A few faults? Yes. There is an insertion of a Jewish wedding scene ... which is phony and gratuitous. There's a melodramatic mishmash towards the end, which has Mr. Fox dressing up like a girl and acting kittenish. That is tasteless and humorless. And the whole thing's too long. If they'll just cut out some of those needless things, all the faults will be corrected and it'll be a joy all the way."

Variety observed "The first half of Thoroughly Modern Mille [sic] is quite successful in striking and maintaining a gay spirit and pace. There are many recognizable and beguiling satirical recalls of the flapper age and some quite funny bits. Liberties taken with reality, not to mention period, in the first half are redeemed by wit and characterization. But the sudden thrusting of the hero ... into a skyscraper-climbing, flagpole-hanging acrobat, a la Harold Lloyd, has little of Lloyd but the myth. This sequence is forced all the way."

Charles Champlin of the Los Angeles Times wrote that the film was "at its best a fresh-as-paint, cute-as-bees-knees, just swell enchantment" with Andrews "altogether superb", though he found the dance numbers "strangely uninspired" and that the second half suffered from "a slapstick but singularly uncomical chase".

Clifford Terry of the Chicago Tribune wrote that "for the first 90 minutes, Thoroughly Modern Millie is really swell, a pip, a humdinger, the bee's knees, a doozy. And that's no raspberries. Spoofing the Fitzgerald folks of the 1920s, the musical comedy bounces and bubbles along as a snappy send-up of the days of roadster ramble seats, Tapioca dances, and unflappable flappers with turned-down hose and turned-on beaux who sometimes were 'fresh as paint'. Unfortunately, Millie is not an hour-and-a-half movie, and its final 50 minutes only demonstrate that what can start out as the berries, can finish up as a lemon."

Leo Sullivan of The Washington Post wrote, "Highly insignificant and deliberately old-fashioned, the film veers and comments in a broadly stylized way ... All [Ross Hunter] may have produced is a commercial movie but enhancing the entire film is his own personal enthusiasm. He seems to be saying this is the way it was and yipes, wasn't it delightful. It was and is."

The Monthly Film Bulletin wrote, "An exploitative film in the sense that it exploits its stars' previous successes as much as their actual talents or the merits of its own script, it nonetheless manages, like the best camp, to make a merit of its defects and to turn the comic-caption corn of its dialogue into a positive attribute."

Roger Ebert gave the film a perfect four stars in his original review, a decision he later admitted in hindsight he was "no longer certain about."

TV Guide rated the film three out of four stars and commented "Although it ultimately runs out of steam, this charming spoof of the 1920s is still one of the 1960s' better musicals ... Andrews is a comic delight, Moore is charming, and Channing steals scene after scene in this enjoyable feature." The film was one of four nostalgia-based films that George Roy Hill made. After Thoroughly Modern Millie, he made Butch Cassidy and the Sundance Kid, The Great Waldo Pepper, and the Oscar-winning The Sting.

On the review aggregator website Rotten Tomatoes, the film holds an approval rating of 85% based on 13 reviews, with an average rating of 7.5/10.

=== Accolades ===
Award	Category	Recipient(s)	Result	Ref.
Academy Awards	Best Supporting Actress	Carol Channing	Nominated	
Academy Awards	Best Art Direction	Art direction: Alexander Golitzen and George C. Webb; Set decoration: Howard Bristol	Nominated	
Academy Awards	Best Costume Design	Jean Louis	Nominated	
Academy Awards	Best Original Score	Elmer Bernstein	Won	
Academy Awards	Best Original Song Score or Adaptation Score	André Previn and Joseph Gershenson	Nominated	
Academy Awards	Best Song	"Thoroughly Modern Millie"; Music by Jimmy Van Heusen; Lyrics by Sammy Cahn	Nominated	
Academy Awards	Best Sound	Ronald Pierce, William Russell, and Waldon O. Watson (for Universal City Studio Sound Department)	Nominated	
Golden Globe Awards	Best Motion Picture – Musical or Comedy		Nominated	
Golden Globe Awards	Best Actress in a Motion Picture – Musical or Comedy	Julie Andrews	Nominated	
Golden Globe Awards	Best Supporting Actress – Motion Picture	Carol Channing	Won	
Golden Globe Awards	Best Original Score – Motion Picture	Elmer Bernstein	Nominated	
Golden Globe Awards	Best Original Song – Motion Picture	"Thoroughly Modern Millie"; Music by Jimmy Van Heusen; Lyrics by Sammy Cahn	Nominated	
Laurel Awards	Top Comedy		Won	
Laurel Awards	Top Female Comedy Performance	Julie Andrews	Won	
Laurel Awards	Top Female Supporting Performance	Carol Channing	Nominated	
Writers Guild of America Awards	Best Written American Musical	Richard Morris	Won	

== See also ==
- List of American films of 1967
