= Hidekazu Yokoyama =

Japanese freestyle wrestler

Personal information
- Full name: Hidekazu Yokoyama
- Nationality: Japanese
- Born: 7 April 1971 (age 55) Akita, Akita, Japan
- Height: 1.78 m (5 ft 10 in)
- Weight: 84 kg (185 lb)

Sport
- Style: Freestyle; Greco-Roman
- Club: Akita Commercial High School
- Coach: Katsuhiko Saito
Medal record
Representing Japan
Asian Games
Men's freestyle wrestling
Bronze medal – third place	1994 Hiroshima	82 kg
Men's Greco-Roman wrestling
Bronze medal – third place	1998 Bangkok	85 kg

Hidekazu Yokoyama (横山 秀和, Yokoyama Hidekazu; born April 7, 1971 in Akita, Akita) is a retired amateur Japanese freestyle wrestler, who competed in the men's light heavyweight category. He won two bronze medals in both freestyle and Greco-Roman at the Asian Games (1994 and 1998), and then represented his nation Japan in two editions of the Olympic Games (1996 and 2004). Having worked as a physical education teacher at Akita Commercial High School, Yokoyama also trained as part of the school's wrestling squad under his personal coach Katsuhiko Saito.

When Japan hosted the 1994 Asian Games in Hiroshima, Yokoyama enchanted the home crowd inside Higashi Stadium by defeating South Korea's Yang Hyun-Mo for a bronze medal in the 82-kg division. The following year, he placed eleventh at the World Championships, and then rounded out the fourth spot in the same class at the 1996 Asian Wrestling Championships in Hangzhou, China.

Yokoyama entered the 1996 Summer Olympics in Atlanta on his major debut in the men's 82 kg class. He pinned Romania's Nicolae Ghiţă in his opening bout, but suffered a stunning 4–2 upset from his rival Yang Hyun-Mo in the second round. Yokoyama lost a chance to dismantle Turkey's Sabahattin Öztürk for a victory in the third round repechage 1–7, dropping him to eleventh spot.

Shortly after the Games, Yokoyama turned his focus to Greco-Roman wrestling, and proved particularly successful with a bronze medal effort in the same category at the 1998 Asian Games in Bangkok, Thailand, outclassing Iran's Behrouz Jamshidi in the process. He also sought his bid to compete for the 2000 Summer Olympics in Sydney, but missed a spot from the Olympic Tournament. Yokoyama made his early retirement in 2000, but came back from the sport three years later to further concentrate on his freestyle wrestling career.

Eight years after his first Olympics, Yokoyama qualified for his second Japanese squad, as a 33-year-old veteran, in the men's 84 kg class at the 2004 Summer Olympics in Athens. Earlier in the process, he guaranteed a spot on the Japanese team by placing second from the Olympic Qualification Tournament in Bratislava, Slovakia. He lost his opening match 1–5 to Iran's Majid Khodaei, but bounced back to hold India's Anuj Kumar down the mat with 8–11 decision to close the prelim pool. Finishing second in the pool and tenth overall, Yokoyama failed to advance further into the quarterfinals.
