= Cael Sanderson =

American wrestler and coach (born 1979)

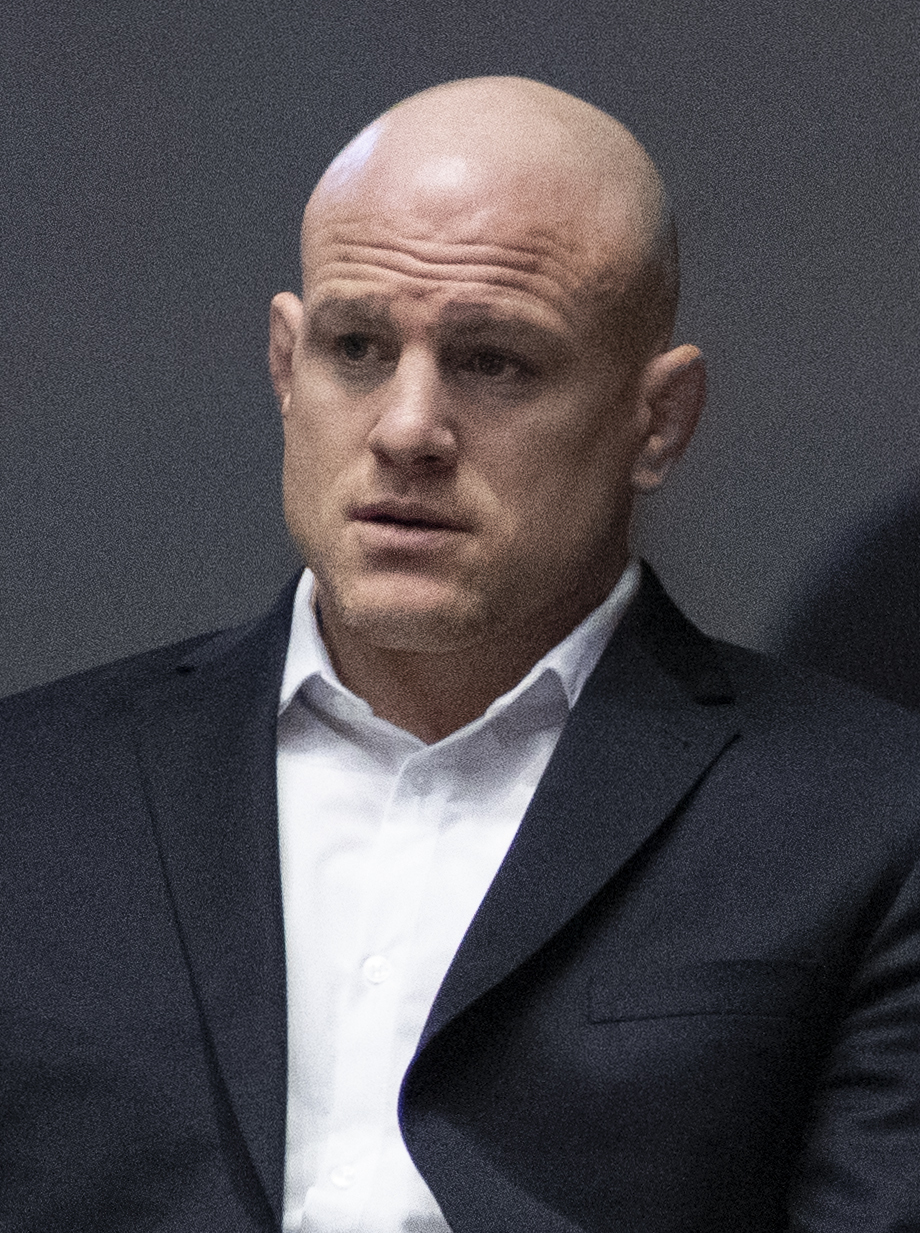
- Sanderson in 2019

Personal information
- Full name: Cael Norman Sanderson
- Born: June 20, 1979 (age 47) Salt Lake City, Utah, U.S.
- Height: 6 ft 0 in (183 cm)
- Weight: 84 kg (185 lb)

Sport
- Country: United States
- Sport: Wrestling
- Events: Freestyle and Folkstyle
- College team: Iowa State
- Club: Nittany Lion Wrestling Club; Sunkist Kids Wrestling Club
- Team: USA
- Coached by: Bobby Douglas
- Now coaching: Penn State University
Medal record
Men's freestyle wrestling
Representing the United States
Olympic Games
Gold medal – first place	2004 Athens	84 kg
World Championships
Silver medal – second place	2003 New York	84 kg
Pan American Games
Bronze medal – third place	2003 Santo Domingo	84 kg
University World Championships
Gold medal – first place	2000 Tokyo	85 kg
Cadet World Championships
Bronze medal – third place	1994 Frankfort	55 kg
Men's collegiate wrestling
Representing the Iowa State Cyclones
NCAA Division I Championships
Gold medal – first place	1999 State College	184 lb
Gold medal – first place	2000 St. Louis	184 lb
Gold medal – first place	2001 Iowa City	184 lb
Gold medal – first place	2002 Albany	197 lb
Big 12 Championships
Gold medal – first place	1999 Ames	184 lb
Gold medal – first place	2000 Lincoln	184 lb
Gold medal – first place	2001 Stillwater	184 lb
Gold medal – first place	2002 Norman	197 lb

Cael Norman Sanderson (/ˈkeɪl/ KAYL; born June 20, 1979) is an American former folkstyle and freestyle wrestler who is the current head coach of Penn State's wrestling team. As a wrestler, he won an Olympic gold medal and was undefeated in four years of collegiate wrestling at Iowa State (159–0), becoming a four-time NCAA Division I champion. He is the only wrestler to win the Dan Hodge Trophy three times, receiving the award in 2000, 2001 (shared) and 2002. He is also the only wrestler in NCAA history to win four NCAA Championships Outstanding Wrestler awards.

Sanderson is the only wrestler in NCAA Division I history to go undefeated in official matches with more than 100 wins. Sports Illustrated named his college career as the second most impressive college sports feat of all-time, behind the setting of four world records by Jesse Owens in a single hour at the 1935 Big Ten track and field conference championship meet.

== Early life ==
Sanderson was born in Salt Lake City, Utah, to Steve and Debbie Sanderson. He attended Wasatch High School in Heber City, Utah, where he was coached by his father, a former wrestler at Brigham Young University. As a high school wrestler, Sanderson was a four-time Utah state champion and compiled a record of 127–3.

== Wrestling career ==
=== College ===
After graduating from high school, Sanderson followed his brothers, Cody and Cole, to Iowa State. After redshirting the 1997-98 college wrestling season, Sanderson won all 39 of his matches to win his first NCAA and Big 12 Conference titles at 184 pounds. He was also the first freshman in NCAA history to be named the Outstanding Wrestler at nationals. His next three seasons were virtually identical, compiling 40 wins and no losses in each and finishing with the only perfect record in NCAA Division I history at 159-0. By winning all of his matches, he became only the second wrestler in history to that point to win four NCAA Division I titles. He was also named the Outstanding Wrestler in all NCAA tournaments he competed in, becoming the only wrestler to win the award four times; no other wrestler has won it more than twice. He did lose 1 match in his career while redshirting and wrestling unattached at the UNI open to Paul Jenn of Iowa. As he was redshirting and wrestling unattached, it did not count against his overall record of 159–0.

Sanderson was a three-time Dan Hodge Trophy winner (collegiate wrestling's equivalent to the Heisman Trophy), being the first to win the award multiple times and the only person to win it three times. For his performance as a senior in 2002, he received the Wade Schalles Award for best collegiate pinner. He holds the longest win-streak across all NCAA divisions. This makes him the most accomplished collegiate wrestler ever.

In 2017, Sanderson was inducted into the Iowa State Hall of Fame.

=== Freestyle ===
Sanderson was a two-time US Cadet World Team Member, placing third and fourth in 1994 and 1995, respectively. He was also a US University National Champion in 1999 and a University World Champion in 2000.

He became the US National Champion in 2001, 2002 and 2003. He was also an original US World Team Member in 2001 and 2002, however, he chose not to participate at the 01' World Championships to focus in folkstyle, and the USA team chose to not compete in 2002.

In 2003, he won the Manitoba Open in Canada in February, placed second at the World Cup in April, third at the 2003 Pan American Games and second at the World Championships. In 2004, he once again claimed the Manitoba Open title and won the US Olympic Team Trials.

At the 2004 Summer Olympics, Sanderson claimed wins over Magomed Kurugliyev, Siarhei Borchanka, Majid Khodaei, Yoel Romero and Moon Eui-jae to become an Olympic Gold medalist in Athens, Greece.

While already a full-time coach at Penn State, Sanderson came out of retirement in 2011 and took home an Ion Corneanu Memorial title, won the US World Team Trials and placed fifth at the World Championships.

In 2011, Sanderson was inducted into the National Wrestling Hall of Fame as a Distinguished Member.

== Freestyle record ==
World Championships & Olympics
Res.	Record	Opponent	Score	Date	Event	Location
2011 World Championships 5th at 84 kg
Loss	13–3	(Russia) Albert Saritov	0–1, 0–3	September 17, 2011	2011 World Wrestling Championships	Istanbul, Turkey
Win	13–2	(Iran) Alireza Goudarzi	6–0, 1–0	September 17, 2011	2011 World Wrestling Championships	Istanbul, Turkey
Win	12–2	(Kazakhstan) Yermek Baiduashov	4–3, 0–1, 2–1	September 17, 2011	2011 World Wrestling Championships	Istanbul, Turkey
Win	11–2	(South Korea) Yoon Chan-uk	Fall	September 17, 2011	2011 World Wrestling Championships	Istanbul, Turkey
Loss	10–2	(Azerbaijan) Sharif Sharifov	1-3, 1-4	September 17, 2011	2011 World Wrestling Championships	Istanbul, Turkey
Win	10–1	(Mexico) Alejandro Gallardo	6–0, 7–0	September 17, 2011	2011 World Wrestling Championships	Istanbul, Turkey
2004 Summer Olympics (gold) at 84kg
Win	9–1	(South Korea) Moon Eui-jae	3–1	August 28, 2004	2004 Olympic Games	Athens, Greece
Win	8–1	(Cuba) Yoel Romero	3–2	August 28, 2004	2004 Olympic Games	Athens, Greece
Win	7–1	(Iran) Majid Khodaei	6–5	August 28, 2004	2004 Olympic Games	Athens, Greece
Win	6–1	(Belarus) Siarhei Borchanka	9–1	August 28, 2004	2004 Olympic Games	Athens, Greece
Win	5–1	(Kazakhstan) Magomed Kurugliyev	4–2	August 28, 2004	2004 Olympic Games	Athens, Greece
2003 World Championships (silver) at 84 kg
Loss	4–1	(Russia) Sazhid Sazhidov	3–4	September 12, 2003	2003 World Wrestling Championships	(United States) New York City, U.S.
Win	4–0	(Georgia (country)) Revaz Mindorashvili	4–2	September 12, 2003	2003 World Wrestling Championships	(United States) New York City, U.S.
Win	3–0	(Armenia) Mahmed Aghaev	3–0	September 12, 2003	2003 World Wrestling Championships	(United States) New York City, U.S.
Win	2–0	(Iran) Majid Khodaei	8–2	September 12, 2003	2003 World Wrestling Championships	(United States) New York City, U.S.
Win	1–0	(Finland) Tero Perkkioe	8–2	September 12, 2003	2003 World Wrestling Championships	(United States) New York City, U.S.

== Collegiate record ==
NCAA Championships Matches
Res.	Record	Opponent	Score	Date	Event
2002 NCAA Championships (gold) at 197
Win	159-0	Jon Trenge	MD 12-4	March 21–23, 2002	2002 NCAA Division I Wrestling Championships
Win	158-0	Nick Preston	MD 18-7	March 21–23, 2002	2002 NCAA Division I Wrestling Championships
Win	157-0	Jason Payne	TF 23-8	March 21–23, 2002	2002 NCAA Division I Wrestling Championships
Win	156-0	Kyle Cerminara	Fall 6:33	March 21–23, 2002	2002 NCAA Division I Wrestling Championships
Win	155-0	Eric Mausser	Fall 3:32	March 21–23, 2002	2002 NCAA Division I Wrestling Championships
Win	154-0	Scott Barker	TF 22-7		
Win	153-0	Tom Grossman	Fall		
Win	152-0	William Gruenwald	Fall		
Win	151-0	Jon Trenge	6-1		
Win	150-0	Jason Gore	Fall		
Win	149-0	Ryan Fulaas	Forfeit		
Win	148-0	Kyle Smith	Fall		
Win	147-0	Will Gruenwald	Fall		
Win	146-0	Bill Stouffer	Fall		
Win	145-0	Tom Grossman	Fall		
Win	144-0	Erik Gladish	Fall		
Win	143-0	Jason Payne	Fall		
Win	142-0	Lee Fullhart	5-3		
Win	141-0	Jon Trenge	MD 16-5		
Win	140-0	Chris Skretkowlz	TF 22-5		
Win	139-0	Nick Curby	Fall		
Win	138-0	Jim Kassner	Fall		
Win	137-0	Ryan Fulsaas	Fall		
Win	136-0	Jareck Horton	Fall		
Win	135-0	Bart George	Fall		
Win	134-0	Nick McTee	Forfeit		
Win	133-0	Joe Compton	TF 23-7		
Win	132-0	Aaron Granell	Fall		
Win	131-0	Brent Miller	TF 20-5		
Win	130-0	Greg Sawyer	TF		
Win	129-0	Daegen Smith	Fall		
Win	128-0	Peter Mosley	Fall		
Win	127-0	Nick Thomas	Fall		
Win	126-0	Chris Skretkowicz	Fall		
Win	125-0	Chad Wallace	Fall		
Win	124-0	Cris Bietz	TF		
Win	123-0	Josh Broadway	TF		
Win	122-0	Jeremiah Kovarik	Fall		
2001 NCAA Championships (gold) at 184 lbs
Win	121-0	Daniel Cormier	8-4	March 15–17, 2001	2001 NCAA Division I Wrestling Championships
Win	120-0	Victor Sveda	MD 21-7	March 15–17, 2001	2001 NCAA Division I Wrestling Championships
Win	119-0	Jessman Smith	TF 21-6	March 15–17, 2001	2001 NCAA Division I Wrestling Championships
Win	118-0	Jeremy Wilson	Fall	March 15–17, 2001	2001 NCAA Division I Wrestling Championships
Win	117-0	Kyle Hanson	TF 24-9	March 15–17, 2001	2001 NCAA Division I Wrestling Championships
Win	116-0	Scott Barker	TF 22-7		
Win	115-0	Daniel Cormier	8-3		
Win	114-0	Ry Stone	Fall		
Win	113-0	Kyle Hansen	MD 21-8		
Win	112-0	Matt Fletcher	Fall		
Win	111-0	R.D. Pursell	Fall		
Win	110-0	Ry Stone	Fall		
Win	109-0	Josh Lambrecht	TF 21-10		
Win	108-0	Shawn Scannel	Fall		
Win	107-0	Daniel Cormier	10-3		
Win	106-0	Jessman Smith	TF		
Win	105-0	Andy Hrovat	Fall		
Win	104-0	Daniel Cormier	MD 14-3		
Win	103-0	Josh Lambrecht	MD 16-8		
Win	102-0	Ed Aliakseyenka	TF		
Win	101-0	Ralph Everett	Fall		
Win	100-0	Jason Rossotti	Fall		
Win	99-0	Ralph DeNisco	MD 17-6		
Win	98-0	Francis Volpe	TF		
Win	97-0	Nate Patrick	MD 16-7		
Win	96-0	Viktor Sveda	MD 14-5		
Win	95-0	Francis Volpe	Fall		
Win	94-0	Marcus Schontube	16-10		
Win	93-0	Josh Bocks	Fall		
Win	92-0	Jessman Smith	Fall		
Win	91-0	Jeff Pangborn	Fall		
Win	90-0	Adam Kellogg	Fall		
Win	89-0	Bert Watford	Fall		
Win	88-0	Paul Okins	TF 19-3		
Win	87-0	Ben Blood	TF 18-3		
Win	86-0	Anton Talamantes	MD 20-6		
Win	85-0	Mike Odle	Fall		
Win	84-0	Viktor Sveda	MD 16-3		
Win	83-0	Josh Lambrecht	MD 12-4		
Win	82-0	Ralph DeNisco	Fall		
Win	81-0	Nick Curcio	Fall		
2000 NCAA Championships (gold) at 184 lbs
Win	80-0	Vertus Jones	MD 19-6	March 16–18, 2000	2000 NCAA Division I Wrestling Championships
Win	79-0	Brandon Eggum	MD 16-5	March 16–18, 2000	2000 NCAA Division I Wrestling Championships
Win	78-0	Rob Rohn	TF 20-5	March 16–18, 2000	2000 NCAA Division I Wrestling Championships
Win	77-0	Dax Pecaro	TF 21-6	March 16–18, 2000	2000 NCAA Division I Wrestling Championships
Win	76-0	Adam Schaaf	Fall	March 16–18, 2000	2000 NCAA Division I Wrestling Championships
Win	75-0	Daniel Cormier	8-4		
Win	74-0	Tom Grossman	MD 17-7		
Win	73-0	Kyle Hansen	Fall		
Win	72-0	Charles McTorry	TF 22-6		
Win	71-0	Mike Marshall	Fall		
Win	70-0	John Maze	TF 27-10		
Win	69-0	Brandon Eggum	6-1		
Win	68-0	Tom Grossman	TF 19-4		
Win	67-0	Daniel Cormier	MD 20-9		
Win	66-0	Brandon Eggum	MD 8-0		
Win	65-0	Tom Grossman	Fall		
Win	64-0	Lionel Halsey	Fall		
Win	63-0	Jeff Knupp	TF 21-6		
Win	62-0	Rob Anspach	Forfeit		
Win	61-0	Dave Murray	Fall		
Win	60-0	Cash Edwards	TF		
Win	59-0	Isaac Weber	MD 16-7		
Win	58-0	Nate Patrick	7-2		
Win	57-0	Kevin Vogel	MD 17-5		
Win	56-0	Lionel Halsey	5-1		
Win	55-0	Sean Salmon	TF 20-5		
Win	54-0	Brian Falciglia	Fall		
Win	53-0	Joe Cotant	TF 20-5		
Win	52-0	Donavan True	Fall		
Win	51-0	Paul Jenn	DQ		
Win	50-0	Joel Schrimpf	Fall		
Win	49-0	Nathan Ackerman	TF 17-2		
Win	48-0	B.J. Shelley	TF 22-6		
Win	47-0	Chad Karnal	Fall		
Win	46-0	Joe Terrill	TF 23-7		
Win	45-0	Damion Hahn	4-3		
Win	44-0	Jessman Smith	TF 17-2		
Win	43-0	Carson Andorf	MD 17-7		
Win	42-0	Ty Swarm	TF 24-5		
Win	41-0	Brandon Eggum	7-4		
Win	40-0	Todd Schmauss	Fall		
Win	39-0	Drew Bouwman	20-5		
Win	38-0	Ryan Rettke	TF 26-11		
1999 NCAA Championships (gold) at 184 lbs
Win	37-0	Brandon Eggum	6-1	March 18–20, 1999	1999 NCAA Division I Wrestling Championships
Win	36-0	Brad Vering	Fall	March 18–20, 1999	1999 NCAA Division I Wrestling Championships
Win	35-0	Andy Hrovat	Fall	March 18–20, 1999	1999 NCAA Division I Wrestling Championships
Win	34-0	Nate Patrick	MD 18-6	March 18–20, 1999	1999 NCAA Division I Wrestling Championships
Win	33-0	Josh Dideon	Fall	March 18–20, 1999	1999 NCAA Division I Wrestling Championships
Win	32-0	Brad Vering	9-5		
Win	31-0	Tom Grossman	MD 13-5		
Win	30-0	Ken Bigley	TF		
Win	29-0	Casey Strand	6-2		
Win	28-0	Tony Spiker	Fall		
Win	27-0	Jason Moore	MD 19-6		
Win	26-0	Matt Carpenter	TF 22-7		
Win	25-0	Scott Coleman	MD 17-7		
Win	24-0	Vertus Jones	6-5		
Win	23-0	Brad Vering	Forfeit		
Win	22-0	Tom Grossman	Fall		
Win	21-0	Mark Munoz	MD 10-2		
Win	20-0	Paul Jenn	TF MD 10-2		
Win	19-0	Tom Grossman	MD 20-8		
Win	18-0	Mark Munoz	5-1		
Win	17-0	Casey Strand	Fall		
Win	16-0	Tom Ciezki	6-3		
Win	15-0	Nate Patrick	7-2		
Win	14-0	Ryan Rettke	Fall		
Win	13-0	John Van Doren	11-4		
Win	12-0	Aaron Simpson	TF 9-3		
Win	11-0	Greg Gingeleskie	5-0		
Win	10-0	James Brimm	5-0		
Win	9-0	Mike Gadsby	TF 19-4		
Win	8-0	Tom Ciezki	TF 23-7		
Win	7-0	Paul Jenn	TF 19-4		
Win	6-0	William Rufis	Fall		
Win	5-0	B.J. Shelley	Fall		
Win	4-0	Brant LaGrange	MD 21-8		
Win	3-0	Steve Burleson	Fall		
Win	2-0	Joe Brougard	TF 20-5		
Win	1-0	George Flannick	TF 20-5		

== Coaching career ==
=== Iowa State ===
Sanderson began his wrestling coaching career with the season ending in 2004 as a special assistant at Iowa State. After short stints in associate head coaching positions, he became the head coach for the season ending in 2007. In three seasons, Sanderson led Iowa State to three Big 12 conference championships and NCAA Division I finishes of second, fifth, and third overall. He also coached his wrestlers to two individual NCAA Division I national titles.

=== Penn State ===
Before the 2009 season ended, Sanderson became the head coach of Penn State's wrestling team. Sanderson's Penn State teams have won thirteen NCAA Division I team titles. During that time, he also coached his wrestlers to 40 individual NCAA Division I titles. At the 2024 NCAA Wrestling Championships, Sanderson's Nittany Lions set an NCAA wrestling record of 172.5 points, broke that record during the 2025 NCAA Wrestling Championships with 177 points, and broke that record during the 2026 NCAA Wrestling Championships with 181.5 points.

== Coaching results ==
Coaching Record
Season	Team Finish	Dual Record	All Americans	National Champions
Iowa State University
2007	2nd place, silver medalist(s)	13-3-0	4	1
2008	5th	16-4-0	7	0
2009	3rd place, bronze medalist(s)	15-3-0	4	1
Iowa State		44-10-0	15	2
Pennsylvania State University
2010	9th	13-6-1	3	0
2011	1st place, gold medalist(s)	17-1-1	5	1
2012	1st place, gold medalist(s)	13-1-0	6	3
2013	1st place, gold medalist(s)	13-1-0	5	2
2014	1st place, gold medalist(s)	15-1-0	7	2
2015	6th	11-4-0	5	1
2016	1st place, gold medalist(s)	16-0-0	6	2
2017	1st place, gold medalist(s)	14-0-0	6	5
2018	1st place, gold medalist(s)	14-0-0	8	4
2019	1st place, gold medalist(s)	14-0-0	7	3
2020	DNC	12-2-0	5	0
2021	2nd place, silver medalist(s)	6-0-0	6	4
2022	1st place, gold medalist(s)	17-0-0	6	5
2023	1st place, gold medalist(s)	16-0-0	8	2
2024	1st place, gold medalist(s)	12-0-0	8	4
2025	1st place, gold medalist(s)	15-0-0	10	2
2026	1st place, gold medalist(s)	15-0-0	8	4
Penn State		233-16-2	109	44
Career		277-26-2	124	46

== Awards and honors ==
2011

- (gold) Ion Corneanu Memorial

2004

- (gold) Summer Olympics
- (gold) Manitoba Open
- John Smith Award as the Freestyle Wrestler of the Year

2003

- (silver) World Wrestling Championships
- (bronze) Pan American Games
- (gold) Manitoba Open
- John Smith Award as the Freestyle Wrestler of the Year

2002

- Best Male College Athlete ESPY Award
- Dan Hodge Trophy winner
- NCAA Division I Championships Outstanding Wrestler
- Wade Schalles Award winner
- (gold) NCAA Division I
- (gold) Big 12 Conference

2001

- Dan Hodge Trophy winner
- NCAA Division I Championships Outstanding Wrestler
- (gold) NCAA Division I
- (gold) Big 12 Conference

2000

- Dan Hodge Trophy winner
- NCAA Division I Championships Outstanding Wrestler
- (gold) NCAA Division I
- (gold) Big 12 Conference

1999

- NCAA Division I Championships Outstanding Wrestler
- (gold) NCAA Division I
- (gold) Big 12 Conference

=== Other honors ===
- Dave Schultz High School Excellence Award in Utah
- Glen Brand inductee
- Iowa Sports Hall of Fame inductee
- Iowa State Cyclones Hall of Fame inductee
- National Wrestling Hall of Fame Distinguished Member
- NCAA 75th Anniversary Wrestling Team member
- Sports Illustrated cover appearance
- Utah Sports Hall of Fame inductee
- Wheaties cereal box appearance

== See also ==
- List of Pennsylvania State University Olympians
- Aleksandr Karelin
