= Vincent Aka-Akesse =

French freestyle wrestler

Personal information
- Full name: Kouadio Vincent Aka-Akesse
- Nationality: Ivory Coast; France
- Born: 25 October 1975 (age 50) N'zi-Comoé, Côte d'Ivoire
- Height: 1.80 m (5 ft 11 in)
- Weight: 96 kg (212 lb)

Sport
- Sport: Wrestling
- Event: Freestyle
- Club: AS Montferrand
- Coached by: Thierry Bourdin
Medal record
Men's freestyle wrestling
Representing France
Mediterranean Games
| Silver medal – second place | 2005 Almería | 96 kg |
European Championships
| Silver medal – second place | 2005 Varna | 96 kg |

Kouadio Vincent Aka-Akesse (born October 25, 1975) is an amateur Ivorian-born French freestyle wrestler, who played for the men's heavyweight category. In 2005, Aka-Akesse had won two medals for the 96 kg class at the Mediterranean Games in Almería, Spain, and at the European Wrestling Championships in Varna, Bulgaria.

Aka-Akesse made his official debut, as a member of the Ivorian team, for the 2000 Summer Olympics in Sydney, where he competed in the men's 85 kg. He placed last in the preliminary pool, against Iran's Amir Reza Khadem, Romania's Nicolae Ghiţă, and Hungary's Gábor Kapuvári, without receiving a technical point. Shortly after his first Olympics, Aka-Akesse moved from his native country Côte d'Ivoire to Clermont-Ferrand, France, where he had undergone full-time training and developed his skills in wrestling at AS Montferrand, under head coach Thierry Bourdin. He also obtained a French citizenship in order to compete internationally for wrestling.

At the 2004 Summer Olympics in Athens, Aka-Akesse competed this time for the men's 84 kg class, representing his adopted nation France. He finished last again in the preliminary pool match against Greece's Lazaros Loizidis and Georgia's Revaz Mindorashvili, without receiving a technical point.

At the 2008 Summer Olympics in Beijing, Aka-Akesse switched to a heavier class by competing in the men's 96 kg division. He lost the preliminary round of sixteen to Azerbaijan's Khetag Gazyumov, who was able to four points each in two straight periods, leaving Aka-Akesse without a single point.
