= Matar Sène =

Senegalese Olympic wrestler

Personal information
- Full name: Matar Sène
- Nationality: Senegalese
- Born: 16 September 1970 (age 55) Dakar, Senegal
- Height: 1.80 m (5 ft 11 in)
- Weight: 84 kg (185 lb)

Sport
- Style: Freestyle
- Club: Ecurie Fass
- Coach: Lansana Coly
Medal record
Men's freestyle wrestling
Representing Senegal
All-Africa Games
Silver medal – second place	2003 Abuja	74 kg

Matar Sène (born September 16, 1970 in Dakar) is a retired amateur Senegalese freestyle wrestler, who competed in the men's light heavyweight category. He picked up a silver medal in the 74-kg division at the 2003 All-Africa Games in Abuja, Nigeria, and also represented his nation Senegal at the 2004 Summer Olympics. Throughout his sporting career, Sene trained full-time for Ecurie Fass Wrestling Club in his native Dakar under his personal coach Lansana Coly.

Sene qualified for the Senegalese squad, as a 34-year-old veteran and a lone wrestler, in the men's 84 kg class at the 2004 Summer Olympics in Athens. He filled up an entry by the International Federation of Association Wrestling (FILA) through a tripartite invitation and an Olympic Solidarity program. Sene lost all three matches each to eventual Olympic bronze medalist Sazhid Sazhidov of Russia by a rare 17–0 thrashing, Tajikistan's Shamil Aliev (3–6), and four-time Olympic veteran Nicolae Ghiţă of Romania (3–11), leaving him on the bottom of the pool and placing seventeenth in the final standings.
