= List of athletes on Wheaties boxes =

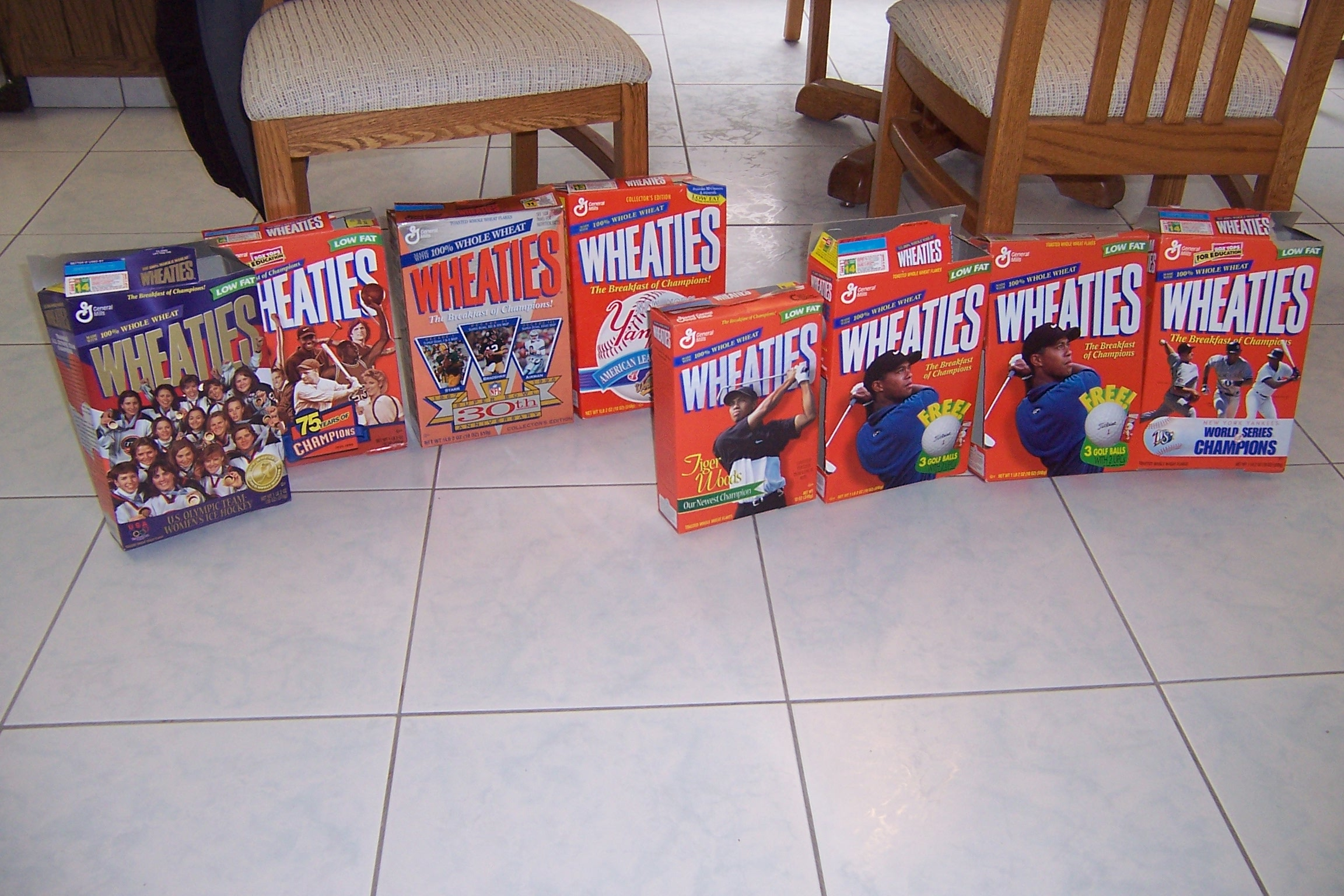
Some Wheaties boxes with athletes or teams on the packaging, from the late 1990s.

In 1934, the breakfast cereal Wheaties began the practice of including pictures of athletes on its packaging to coincide with its slogan, "The Breakfast of Champions." In its original form, athletes were depicted on the sides or back of the cereal box, though in 1958 Wheaties began placing the pictures on the front of the box. The tradition has included hundreds of athletes from many different sports, and also team depictions.

This article lists the athletes or teams depicted on Wheaties boxes, along with the year(s) of depiction and sport played. This list is not all-inclusive, and athletes may have been shown together with teams and groups, or on the sides, back, or front of the box. Most athletes appeared on the standard Wheaties box, while others appeared on the Honey Frosted Wheaties (HFW), Crispy Wheaties 'n' Raisins (CWR), Wheaties Energy Crunch (WEC), or Wheaties Fuel (WF) boxes.

Around 1990, General Mills did a promotion called "Picture Yourself on a Wheaties Box," in which, for a fee, they would make a custom Wheaties box from one's own photograph that was sealed in clear acrylic. Kristi Yamaguchi, among other athletes, was featured in advertising this campaign.

== Individual athletes ==
Year	Athlete	Sport	Notes	Ref
1934, 1992, 1999	Lou Gehrig	Baseball	First athlete depicted	
1934	Jimmie Foxx	Baseball		
1934	Ellsworth Vines	Tennis		
1934	Elinor Smith	Aviator	First female depicted	
1934	Martin and Osa Johnson	Aviators	First married couple depicted	
1935	Dizzy Dean	Baseball		
1935	Babe Didrikson Zaharias	Golf	First female athlete depicted	
1935	Jane Fauntz	Olympic diving		
1935	Benny Friedman	Football	Michigan New York Giants HOF	
1936	Robert Kessler	Basketball		
1936	Jesse Owens	Track and Field	First African American athlete depicted	
1936	Kit Klein	Speedskating		
1936	Wilbur Shaw	Auto racing (American open-wheel car racing)		
1937	Earl Averill	Baseball		
1937	Buck Jordan	Baseball		
1937	Lefty Gomez	Baseball		
1937	Mel Ott	Baseball		
1937	Cecil Travis	Baseball		
1937	Harold "Hal" Trosky	Baseball		
1938	Bob Feller	Baseball		
1938	Lou Fette	Baseball		
1938	Charlie Gehringer	Baseball		
1938	Lefty Grove	Baseball		
1938	Billy Herman	Baseball		
1938	Carl Hubbell	Baseball		
1939	Leo Durocher	Baseball		
1939	Johnny Mize	Baseball		
1939	Jack Manders	Football	Pro football's first kicking specialist	
1930s	Marty Barry	Ice hockey		
1947	Hank Greenberg	Baseball		
1951	Tom Fears	Football		
1951	Otto Graham	Football		
1951	George Kell	Baseball		
1951	Ralph Kiner	Baseball		
1951	Bob Lemon	Baseball		
1951	Johnny Lujack	Football		
1952	Roy Campanella	Baseball		
1952	Glenn Davis	Football		
1952	George Mikan	Basketball	Minneapolis Lakers	
1952	Elwin "Preacher" Roe	Baseball		
1952	Bob Waterfield	Football		
1956	Bob Cousy	Basketball		
1956	Bobby Layne	Football		
1956	Duke Snider	Baseball		
1958	Bob Richards	Track and field (pole vault)	First athlete depicted on front of box	
1959	Esther Williams	Swimming		
1964	Bart Starr	Football		
1964	Tom Tresh	Baseball		
1967	Raymond Berry	Football		
1967	Joe Horlen	Baseball		
1967	Tim McCarver	Baseball		
1967	Billy Mills	Running track		
1967	Bobby Richardson	Baseball		
1968	Tom Matte	Football		
1976, 2012	Bruce Jenner	Decathlon		
1983	Steve Veltman	Bicycle Motocross Racing		
1984	Leslie Deniz	Discus		
1984, 1999, 2012	Mary Lou Retton	Gymnastics	First gymnast (and female Gymnast) depicted	
1985	Pete Rose	Baseball		
1986, 2000	Walter Payton	Football	First African-American on front of package	
1987	Chris Evert	Tennis		
1987	Jim Kelly	Football		
1988	Sammy Chagolla	Wrestling		
1988	A.C. Green	Basketball		
1988	Michael Jordan	Basketball	Most depictions on box (18 total)	
1988	Steve Largent	Football		
1989	Johnny Bench	Baseball		
1989	Detroit Pistons	Basketball		
1989	Joe Dumars	Basketball		
1989	Jim Palmer	Baseball		
1990	Eric Davis	Baseball		
1990	Boomer Esiason	Football		
1991	Tom Barrasso	Ice hockey		
1991	Phil Bourque	Ice hockey		
1991	Paul Coffey	Ice hockey		
1991	Bob Errey	Ice hockey		
1991	Randy Gilhen	Ice hockey		
1991, 1992	Jaromír Jágr	Ice hockey		
1991, 1992	Mario Lemieux	Ice hockey		
1991	Troy Loney	Ice hockey		
1991	Frank Pietrangelo	Ice hockey		
1991	Kevin Stevens	Ice hockey		
1991	Peter Taglianetti	Ice hockey		
1991, 1992, 1993	Horace Grant	Basketball		
1992, 1999	Barry Sanders	Football		
1992	Babe Ruth	Baseball		
1993	Larry Bird	Basketball		
1993	Jack Del Rio	Football		
1993	Chris Doleman	Football		
1993	Clyde Drexler	Basketball		
1993	John Elway	Football		
1995, 2001	Cal Ripken Jr.	Baseball		
1995	Josh Gibson	Baseball		
1995	Dan Marino	Football		
1996	Amanda Borden	Gymnastics	U.S. Olympic gymnastics team box	
1996	Amy Chow	Gymnastics	U.S. Olympic gymnastics team box	
1996	Dominique Dawes	Gymnastics	U.S. Olympic gymnastics team box	
1996	Tom Dolan	Swimming		
1996	Michael Johnson	track and field		
1996	Shannon Miller	Gymnastics	U.S. Olympic gymnastics team box	
1996	Dominique Moceanu	Gymnastics	U.S. Olympic gymnastics team box	
1996	Dan O'Brien	Track and field (decathlon)		
1996	Jaycie Phelps	Gymnastics	U.S. Olympic gymnastics team box	
1996	Jackie Robinson	Baseball		
1996	Roger Staubach	football		
1996	Kerri Strug	Gymnastics	U.S. Olympic gymnastics team box	
1996	Amy Van Dyken	Swimming		
1996	Steve Young	Football	(CWR)	
1996, 1999	Troy Aikman	Football		
1996, 2010	Dale Earnhardt	Auto racing (NASCAR)		
1996–2000	Ken Griffey Jr.	Baseball		
1997	Arthur Ashe	Tennis		
1997	Terry Glenn	Football		
1997	"Mean" Joe Greene	Football	(CWR)	
1997	Franco Harris	Football		
1997, 2007	Tony Gwynn	Baseball		
1998	Terrell Davis	Football		
1998	Tricia Dunn	Ice hockey		
1998	Brett Favre	Football		
1998	Cammi Granato	Ice hockey		
1998	Mark McGwire	Baseball		
1998	Richard Petty	Auto racing (NASCAR)		
1999	Stone Cold Steve Austin	Professional wrestling		
1999	Lance Armstrong	Cycling		
1999	Brandi Chastain	Soccer		
1999	Arnold Palmer	Golf		
1999	Mia Hamm	Soccer		
1999	Joe Torre	Baseball		
1999, 2012	Muhammad Ali	Boxing		
1999, 2000, 2001	Bill Elliott	Auto racing (NASCAR)	(CWR Reg.) (HFW)	
2000	Stacy Dragila	Pole Vault		
2000	Pete Sampras	Tennis		
2001	Barry Bonds	Baseball		
2001	Tony Dorsett	Football		
2001	Althea Gibson	Tennis		
2001	Kirby Puckett	Baseball		
2001	Jim Thorpe	Track & Field, Football, Baseball		
2001	Dave Winfield	Baseball		
2002	Hank Aaron	Baseball		
2002	A. J. Foyt	Auto racing (American open-wheel car racing)		
2002	Sarah Hughes	Figure skating		
2002	Cael Sanderson	Wrestling		
2002	Emmitt Smith	Football		
2002	Ozzie Smith	Baseball		
2003	Kevin Garnett	Basketball		
2003	Wayne Gretzky	Ice hockey		
2003	Rafael Palmeiro	Baseball		
2003	Joe Paterno	College Football Coach (Penn State)		
2003	Darrell Waltrip	Auto racing (NASCAR)		
2004	Andre Agassi	Tennis		
2004	Carl Lewis	Track & Field		
2004	Justin Gatlin	Track		
2004	Peyton Manning	Football		
2004	Pedro Martínez	Baseball		
2004	David Ortiz	Baseball		
2004	Carly Patterson	Gymnastics		
2004	David Robinson	Basketball		
2004	Jackie Joyner-Kersee	Track & Field		
2004, 2012, 2016	Michael Phelps	Swimming		
2004	Michael Vick	Football		
2005	Roberto Clemente	Baseball		
2005	Tim Duncan	Basketball		
2005	Kirk Gibson	Baseball		
2005	Shaquille O'Neal	Basketball		
2005	Albert Pujols	Baseball		
2006	Chris Carpenter	Baseball		
2006	Julius Erving	Basketball		
2006	Doug Flutie	Football		
2006	Apolo Anton Ohno	Short track speed skating		
2006	Alex Rodriguez	Baseball		
2006	Joey Cheek	Long Track Speedskating		
2007	Bill Russell	Basketball		
2008	Jarrod Shoemaker	Triathlon		
2008	Hunter Kemper	Triathlon		
2008	Bryan Clay	Decathlon		
2008	Nastia Liukin	Gymnastics		
2009	Willis Reed	Basketball		
2010	Lindsey Vonn	Alpine skiing		
2010	Shaun White	Snowboarding		
2010	Seth Wescott	Snowboard cross		
2011	Chris McCormack	Triathlon	(WF)	
2011, 2012	Aaron Rodgers	Football		
2012	Clay Matthews III	Football	(WF)	
2012	Misty May-Treanor	Beach Volleyball		
2012	Samantha "Sam" Gordon	Football	First female Football player	
2013	Adrian Peterson	Football		
2014	Sage Kotsenburg	Snowboarding		
2014	Mikaela Shiffrin	Alpine skiing		
2014	Anthony Pettis	Mixed Martial Arts		
2015	Stephen Curry	Basketball		
2016	Ryan Dungey	Motocross		
2017	Jordan Spieth	Golf		
2018	Kyrie Irving	Basketball		
2018	Russell Wilson	Football		
2019	Serena Williams	Tennis		
	Kareem Abdul-Jabbar	Basketball		
	Michelle Akers	Soccer		
	Ethan Allen	Baseball		
	Johnny Allen	Baseball		
	Marcus Allen	Football		
	Sandy Alomar Jr.	Baseball		
	Leonel Álvarez	Soccer		
	Ignacio Ambriz	Soccer		
	Ottis Anderson	Football		
	George Lee "Sparky" Anderson	Baseball		
	Luke Appling	Baseball		
	B. J. Armstrong	Basketball		
	Morrie Arnovich	Baseball		
	Steve Atwater	Football		
	Arnold "Red" Auerbach	Basketball		
	Jeff Bagwell	Baseball		
	Max Baer	Boxing		
	Chris Bailey	Tennis		
	George Barclay	Baseball		
	Justin McCarthy "Sam" Barry	Basketball		
	Marie Bartoletti	Marathon	(WEC)	
	Marlene Bauer	Golf		
	Sammy Baugh	Football		
	Mark Bavaro	Football		
	Josh Beckett	Baseball		
	Myriam Bédard	Biathlon		
	Beau Bell	Baseball		
	James "Cool Papa" Bell	Baseball		
	Andy Benes	Baseball		
	Brooke Bennett	Swimming		
	Cornelius Bennett	Football		
	Edgar Bennett	Football		
	Patty Berg	Golf		
	Wally Berger	Baseball		
	Yogi Berra	Baseball		
	Bernie Bierman	Football		
	Craig Biggio	Baseball		
	Simone Biles	Gymnastics		
	Drew Bledsoe	Football		
	Ken Block	Auto racing (Rallying)		
	Zeke Bonura	Baseball		
	Lou Boudreau	Baseball		
	Claudio Branco	Soccer		
	Tommy Bridges	Baseball		
	Johnny Mack Brown	Football		
	Tim Brown	Football		
	Terry Bradshaw	Football		
	Isaac Bruce	Football		
	Don Budge	Tennis		
	Mark Buehrle	Baseball		
	Jay Buhner	Baseball		
	Nick Buoniconti	Football		
	Ellis Burks	Baseball		
	Dick Butkus	Football		
	Wally Butts	Football		
	Karyn Bye	Ice hockey		
	Earnest Byner	Football		
	Kyle Busch	Auto racing (NASCAR)		
	Ken Caminiti	Baseball		
	Harry Caray	Baseball broadcaster		
	Cris Carter	Football		
	Bill Cartwright	Basketball		
	Ron Cey	Baseball		
	Wilt Chamberlain	Basketball		
	Mark Chmura	Football		
	Earl "Dutch" Clark	Football		
	Gary Clark	Football		
	Roger Clemens	Baseball		
	Harlond Clift	Baseball		
	Ben Coates	Football		
	Mickey Cochrane	Baseball		
	David Cone	Baseball		
	Michael Cooper	Basketball		
	Joey Cora	Baseball		
	Roger Craig	Football		
	Joe Cronin	Baseball		
	Jim Crowley	Football		
	Kiki Cuyler	Baseball		
	Harry Danning	Baseball		
	Bob Davies	Basketball		
	Curt Davis	Baseball		
	Darryl Dawkins	Basketball		
	Paul Dean	Baseball		
	Frank Demaree	Baseball		
	Jack Dempsey	Boxing		
	Paul Derringer	Baseball		
	Donna DeVarona	Swimming		
	Bill Dickey	Baseball		
	Joe DiMaggio	Baseball		
	Abner Doubleday	Baseball		
	Marshall Faulk	Football		
	Lew Fonseca	Baseball		
	Barry Foster	Football		
	Gretchen Fraser	Alpine skiing		
	Frankie Frisch	Baseball		
	Walt Frazier	Basketball		
	Andrés Galarraga	Baseball		
	Juan González	Baseball		
	Joe "Flash" Gordon	Baseball		
	Goose Goslin	Baseball		
	Red Grange	Football		
	Kevin Greene	Football		
	Ralph Guldahl	Golf		
	Stanley Hack	Baseball		
	Odell Hale	Baseball		
	Gabby Hartnett	Baseball		
	John Havlicek	Basketball		
	Eric Heiden	(CWR) Speed skating		
	James "Chico" Hernandez	(WEC) Sombo wrestling		
	Merril Hoge	Football		
	Ben Hogan	Golf		
	Nat Holman	Basketball		
	Mike Holmgren	Football		
	Desmond Howard	Football		
	Dixie Howell	Baseball		
	Kent Hrbek	Baseball		
	Don Hutson	Football		
	Doug Heir	Paralympics		
	Peter Jacobsen	Golf		
	Joe Jacoby	Football		
	Ned Jarrett	Auto racing (NASCAR)		
	Ab Jenkins	Auto racing		
	Lynn Jennings	Long-distance running		
	Derek Jeter	Baseball		
	Magic Johnson	Basketball		
	Pepper Johnson	Football		
	Randy Johnson	Baseball		
	Vinnie Johnson	Basketball		
	Brent Jones	Football		
	Howard Jones	Football		
	K. C. Jones	Basketball		
	Tom Jones	Football		
	Jim Kelly	Football		
	Steve Kerr	Basketball		
	Katie King	Ice hockey		
	Harry Kipke	Football		
	Chuck Klein	Baseball		
	Bernie Kosar	Football		
	Jack Kramer	Tennis		
	Jim Lachey	Football		
	Bill Laimbeer	Basketball		
	Sean Landeta	Football		
	Carnell Lake	Football		
	Barry Larkin	Baseball		
	Ty Law	Football		
	Bill Lee	Baseball		
	Darrell Lester	Football		
	Lawson Little	Golf		
	Greg Lloyd	Football		
	Kenny Lofton	Baseball		
	Vince Lombardi	Football		
	Ernie Lombardi	Baseball		
	Luc Longley	Basketball		
	Ronnie Lott	Football	(HFW)	
	Jon Lugbill	Whitewater canoeing		
	Todd Lyght	Football		
	George Maddox	Football		
	Greg Maddux	Baseball		
	Phil Mahre	Alpine skiing		
	Steve Mahre	Alpine skiing		
	Rick Mahorn	Basketball		
	Gus Mancuso	Baseball		
	Tony Manero	Golf		
	Lloyd Mangrum	Golf		
	Charles Mann	Football		
	Edgar "Eggs" Manske	Football		
	Mickey Mantle	Baseball		
	Heinie Manush	Baseball		
	Alice Marble	Tennis		
	Marty Marion	Baseball		
	Johnny "Pepper" Martin	Baseball		
	Edgar Martínez	Baseball		
	Tino Martinez	Baseball		
	Willie Mays	Baseball		
	Tim McCoy			
	Michael McCrary	Football		
	Dave MacMillan	Basketball		
	Bo McMillin	Football		
	Mary T. Meagher	Swimming		
	Joe Medwick	Baseball		
	José Mesa	Baseball		
	Art Monk	Football		
	Joe Montana	Football		
	Warren Moon	Football		
	Johnny Moore	Baseball		
	Byron "Bam" Morris	Football		
	Hal Morris	Baseball		
	Wally Moses	Baseball		
	Van Lingle Mungo	Baseball		
	George Murray	Wheelchair Roadracer		
	Stan Musial	Baseball		
	Mike Mussina	Baseball		
	Randy Myers	Baseball		
	Joe Namath	Football		
	Steve Nash	Basketball		
	Byron Nelson	Golf		
	Cindy Nelson	Alpine skiing		
	Ernie Nevers	Football		
	Hal Newhouser	Baseball		
	Bobo Newsom	Baseball		
	Jack Nicklaus	Golf		
	Hideo Nomo	Baseball		
	Ken Norton	Boxing		
	Jay Novacek	Football		
	Bart Oates	Football		
	Davey O'Brien	Football		
	Neil O'Donnell	Football		
	Jonathan Ogden	Football		
	Tom Osborne	Football		
	Orlando Pace	Football		
	LeRoy "Satchel" Paige	Baseball		
	Brad Park	Ice hockey		
	Benny Parsons	Auto racing (NASCAR)		
	Lynn Patrick	Ice hockey		
	John Paxson	Basketball		
	David Pearson	Auto racing (NASCAR)		
	Drew Pearson	Football		
	Lee Petty	Auto racing (NASCAR)		
	Mike Piazza	Baseball		
	Andy Pilney	Football		
	Scottie Pippen	Basketball		
	Jim Pollard	Basketball		
	Raymond Radcliff	Baseball		
	Andre Reed	Football		
	Harold "Pee Wee" Reese	Baseball		
	Jerry Rice	Football		
	Mark Richt	College Football Coach (University of Georgia)		
	Freddy Rincón	Soccer		
	José Rijo	Baseball		
	Phil Rizzuto	Baseball		
	Brooks Robinson	Baseball		
	Bill Rodgers	Track and field (marathon)		
	Dennis Rodman	Basketball		
	Al Rosen	Baseball		
	Norman Ross	Swimming		
	Charles "Red" Ruffing	Baseball		
	Nolan Ryan	Baseball	(CWR)	
	Mark Rypien	Football		
	Chris Sabo	Baseball		
	Joan Benoit Samuelson	Marathon		
	Deion Sanders	Football	(HFW)	
	Ricky Sanders	Football		
	Jerry Sandusky	Football		
	Gene Sarazen	Golf		
	Wes Schulmerich	Baseball		
	Barbara Ann Scott	Figure skating		
	Byron Scott	Basketball		
	Todd Scott	Football		
	Briana Scurry	Soccer		
	Shannon Sharpe	Football		
	Don Shula	Football		
	Al Simmons	Baseball		
	Phil Simms	Football		
	Bruce Smith	Football		
	Lee Smith	Baseball		
	Neil Smith	Football		
	John Smoltz	Baseball		
	Sam Snead	Golf		
	Paul Sorrento	Baseball		
	Warren Spahn	Baseball		
	Chris Spielman	Football		
	Eddie Stanky	Baseball		
	Dave Stockton	Golf		
	Elvis Stojko	Figure skating		
	Harry Stuhldreher	Football		
	Pat Summitt	Basketball coach		
	Joe Theismann	Football		
	Yancey Thigpen	Football		
	Frank Thomas	Baseball	(CWR)	
	Isiah Thomas	Basketball		
	Thurman Thomas	Football		
	Reyna Thompson	Football		
	Lee Trevino	Golf		
	Johnny Unitas	Football		
	Carlos Valderrama	Soccer		
	Arky Vaughan	Baseball		
	Zoilo Versalles	Baseball		
	Maribel Vinson	Figure skater		
	Joe Vosmik	Baseball		
	Dwyane Wade	Basketball		
	Wallace Wade	Football		
	Lynn Waldorf	Football		
	Pedro Depacas	Boomerang		
	Doak Walker	Football		
	Gerald "Gee" Walker	Baseball		
	Wallenda Troupe	High wire performers		
	Bucky Walters	Baseball		
	Paul Waner	Baseball		
	Cotton Warburton	Football		
	Lon Warneke	Baseball		
	Glenn S. "Pop" Warner	Football		
	J. J. Watt	Football	First pair of brothers depicted	
	T. J. Watt	Football	First pair of brothers depicted	
	Ricky Watters	Football		
	Tom Weiskopf	Golf		
	Johnny Weissmuller	Swimming		
	David Wells	Baseball		
	Billy Welu	Bowling		
	Jerry West	Basketball		
	Jo Jo White	Basketball		
	Reggie White	Football		
	Pinky Whitney	Baseball		
	Laura Wilkinson	Diving		
	Bernie Williams	Baseball		
	Ted Williams	Baseball		
	Dan Wilson	Baseball		
	Hack Wilson	Baseball		
	Tiger Woods	Golf		
	Rod Woodson	Football		
	James Worthy	Basketball		
	Kristi Yamaguchi	Figure skating	(HFW)	
	Cale Yarborough	Auto racing (NASCAR)		
	Rudy York	Baseball		

== Teams ==
Year	Team	Sport	Notes	Ref
1987	Minnesota Twins	Baseball	World Series Champions (first team depicted on box)	
1988	Washington Redskins	Football	Super Bowl XXII	
1989	Detroit Pistons	Basketball	NBA Champions	
1992	Pittsburgh Penguins	Hockey	Stanley Cup Champions	
1993	Dallas Cowboys	Football	Super Bowl XXVII Champions	
1994	Dallas Cowboys	Football	Super Bowl XXVIII Champions	
1995	Northwestern Wildcats	Football	Big Ten Champions	
1995	Atlanta Braves	Baseball	World Series Champions	
1995	Cleveland Indians	Baseball	American League Champions	
1996	Dallas Cowboys	Football	Super Bowl XXX Champions	
1996	U.S. Olympic Women's Gymnastics Team	Gymnastics	Olympic gold medalists	
1997	U.S. Olympic men's ice hockey team	Hockey (men)	Olympic gold medalists (1980)	
1998	Target Chip Ganassi Racing CART team	CART	CART FedEx Championship Series champions	
1998	Denver Broncos	Football	Super Bowl XXXII Champions	
1998	U.S. Olympic Women's Ice Hockey team	Hockey (women)	Olympic gold medalists Five members were unable to be included due to NCAA regulations regarding endorsements	
1998	Arizona Diamondbacks	Baseball	inaugural season	
1998	De La Salle High School	Football	High School football	
1998	DeMatha High School	Football	High School football	
2000	St. Louis Rams	Football	Super Bowl XXXIV Champions	
2001	Dallas Cowboys	Football	"35 Years of Championship Performance"	
2001	Baltimore Ravens	Football	Super Bowl XXXV Champions	
2002	New England Patriots	Football	Super Bowl XXXVI Champions	
2003	Tampa Bay Buccaneers	Football	Super Bowl XXXVII Champions	
2004	Boston Red Sox	Baseball	World Series Champions	
2005	Texas Longhorns	Football	National Champions	
2005	Texas Western College	Basketball	NCAA Champions (1966)	
2005	Chicago White Sox	Baseball	World Series Champions	
2006	Miami Heat	Basketball	NBA Champions	
2006	Detroit Shock	Basketball	WNBA Champions	
2006	Georgia Bulldogs	Football		
2006	Michigan Wolverines	Football		
2006	Notre Dame Fighting Irish	Football		
2006	Texas Longhorns	Football	2 boxes in 2006	
2006	Texas A&M Aggies	Football		
2006	St. Louis Cardinals	Baseball	World Series Champions	
2007	Boston Red Sox	Baseball	World Series Champions	
2007	Florida Gators	Basketball (men)		
2007	North Carolina Tar Heels	Basketball (men)		
2007	Kentucky Wildcats	Basketball (men)		
2007	Tennessee Lady Vols	Basketball (women)		
2008	Boston Celtics	Basketball	NBA Champions	
2009	Los Angeles Lakers	Basketball	NBA Champions	
2010	Los Angeles Lakers	Basketball	NBA Champions	
2010	Seattle Storm	Basketball	WNBA Champions	

== Fictitious characters ==
Year	Athlete	Sport	Notes	Ref
2023	Spider-Man	N/A	Sold in celebration of Marvel’s Spider-Man 2	
2025	Marty Mauser	Table Tennis	Referenced in film trailer and sold as an actual product prior to movie's release	

== Sources ==
- Wheaties Official Site Champions List
