= Gökhan Yavaşer =

Turkish freestyle wrestler

Personal information
- Full name: Gökhan Yavaşer
- Nationality: Turkey
- Born: 1 January 1978 (age 48) Sivas, Turkey
- Height: 1.76 m (5 ft 9 1/2 in)
- Weight: 84 kg (185 lb)

Sport
- Country: Turkey
- Style: Freestyle
- Club: Ankara Adalet
- Coach: Turan Ceylan
Medal record
Men's freestyle wrestling
Representing Turkey
European Championships
Bronze medal – third place	2009 Vilnius	84 kg
Silver medal – second place	2006 Moscow	84 kg
Gold medal – first place	2004 Ankara	84 kg
Military World Games
Gold medal – first place	2003 Istanbul	84 kg
World Cup
Bronze medal – third place	2001 Baltimore	76 kg
Summer Universiade
Bronze medal – third place	2005 İzmir	84 kg
European Junior Championships
Gold medal – first place	1997 Istanbul	70 kg
Silver medal – second place	1996 Sofia	68 kg

Gökhan Yavaşer (born 1 January 1978 in Sivas) is a retired amateur Turkish freestyle wrestler, who competed in the men's light heavyweight category. He produced a remarkable tally of four career medals, including a bronze in the 84-kg division at the 2005 Summer Universiade in İzmir, and also represented his nation Turkey at the 2004 Summer Olympics, finishing fifteenth in the process. Throughout his sporting career, Yavaser trained full-time as a member of the wrestling squad for Gebze Belediyesi SC İzmit, under his personal coach and mentor Turan Ceylan.

Yavaser emerged himself into a sporting fame at the 2004 European Championships in Ankara, where he ousted his Georgian rival Revaz Mindorashvili in the final match 3–2, and ran off the mat for the gold medal in front of the home crowd.

Four months later, Yavaser qualified for the Turkish squad in the men's 84 kg class at the 2004 Summer Olympics in Athens. Earlier in the process, he placed seventh from the 2003 World Wrestling Championships in New York City, New York, United States to earn a spot on the Turkish wrestling team to the Games. Yavaser lost his opening match 6–0 to Ukraine's Taras Danko, but soared smoothly with an easy victory over Armenia's Mamed Aghaev, who was immediately disqualified for infringing the rules of the tournament. Placing second in the pool and fifteenth overall, Yavaser failed to advance to the quarterfinals.

At the 2005 Summer Universiade in İzmir, Yavaser enchanted the home audience inside the hall, as he turned down South Korea's An Jae-Man on the ring for the bronze medal with an astounding 3–2 score. The following year, Yavaser continued his medal streak with a silver in the same class at the European Championships in Moscow, before taking off his two-year break from wrestling to focus on personal commitments.

In 2009, Yavaser came out of retirement to pick up a bronze medal over Poland's Radosław Marcinkiewicz in the 84-kg class at the European Championships in Vilnius, Lithuania.
