= Wrestling at the 2002 Asian Games – Men's freestyle 84 kg =

Men's freestyle 84 kg at the 2002 Asian Games
- Venue: Yangsan Gymnasium
- Date: 6–7 October 2002
- Competitors: 12 from 12 nations

Medalists
gold medal	Moon Eui-jae	South Korea
silver medal	Magomed Kurugliyev	Kazakhstan
bronze medal	Shamil Aliev	Tajikistan

The men's freestyle 84 kilograms wrestling competition at the 2002 Asian Games in Busan was held on 6 October and 7 October at the Yangsan Gymnasium.

The competition held with an elimination system of three or four wrestlers in each pool, with the winners qualify for the semifinals and final by way of direct elimination.

== Schedule ==
All times are Korea Standard Time (UTC+09:00)

Date	Time	Event
Sunday, 6 October 2002	10:00	Round 1
Sunday, 6 October 2002	16:00	Round 2
Sunday, 6 October 2002	16:00	Round 3
Monday, 7 October 2002	10:00	1/2 finals
Monday, 7 October 2002	16:00	Finals

== Results ==
Legend

- WO — Won by walkover

=== Preliminary ===
==== Pool 1 ====
Pos	Athlete	Pld	W	L	CP	TP	Qualification
1	Moon Eui-jae (KOR)	2	2	0	8	20	Knockout round
2	Hani Al-Marafi (JOR)	2	1	1	3	5	
3	Jumakhan Ahmadi (AFG)	2	0	2	1	1	

Source: Report

	Score		CP
Moon Eui-jae (KOR)	10–1 Fall	Hani Al-Marafi (JOR)	4–0 TO
Jumakhan Ahmadi (AFG)	0–10	Moon Eui-jae (KOR)	0–4 ST
Hani Al-Marafi (JOR)	4–1	Jumakhan Ahmadi (AFG)	3–1 PP

==== Pool 2 ====
Pos	Athlete	Pld	W	L	CP	TP	Qualification
1	Aslan Sanakoev (UZB)	2	2	0	7	18	Knockout round
2	Alaa Zaghloul (QAT)	2	1	1	4	0	
3	Anuj Chaudhary (IND)	2	0	2	1	2	

Source: Report

	Score		CP
Aslan Sanakoev (UZB)	6–2	Anuj Chaudhary (IND)	3–1 PP
Alaa Zaghloul (QAT)	0–12	Aslan Sanakoev (UZB)	0–4 ST
Anuj Chaudhary (IND)	WO	Alaa Zaghloul (QAT)	0–4 PA

==== Pool 3 ====
Pos	Athlete	Pld	W	L	CP	TP	Qualification
1	Shamil Aliev (TJK)	2	2	0	6	10	Knockout round
2	Pejman Dorostkar (IRI)	2	1	1	4	6	
3	Katsutoshi Semba (JPN)	2	0	2	1	1	

Source: Report

	Score		CP
Shamil Aliev (TJK)	7–0	Katsutoshi Semba (JPN)	3–0 PO
Pejman Dorostkar (IRI)	2–3	Shamil Aliev (TJK)	1–3 PP
Katsutoshi Semba (JPN)	1–4	Pejman Dorostkar (IRI)	1–3 PP

==== Pool 4 ====
Pos	Athlete	Pld	W	L	CP	TP	Qualification
1	Magomed Kurugliyev (KAZ)	2	2	0	7	13	Knockout round
2	Boldyn Sainbayar (MGL)	2	1	1	3	10	
3	Almazbek Ergeshov (KGZ)	2	0	2	1	3	

Source: Report

	Score		CP
Boldyn Sainbayar (MGL)	0–3	Magomed Kurugliyev (KAZ)	0–3 PO
Almazbek Ergeshov (KGZ)	3–10	Boldyn Sainbayar (MGL)	1–3 PP
Magomed Kurugliyev (KAZ)	10–0	Almazbek Ergeshov (KGZ)	4–0 ST

=== Knockout round ===
1/2 finals
Moon Eui-jae (KOR)	3
Aslan Sanakoev (UZB)	2
Shamil Aliev (TJK)	2
Magomed Kurugliyev (KAZ)	3

Final
Moon Eui-jae (KOR)	3
Magomed Kurugliyev (KAZ)	2
3rd–4th place
Aslan Sanakoev (UZB)	1
Shamil Aliev (TJK)	3

== Final standing ==
Rank	Athlete
1st place, gold medalist(s)	Moon Eui-jae (KOR)
2nd place, silver medalist(s)	Magomed Kurugliyev (KAZ)
3rd place, bronze medalist(s)	Shamil Aliev (TJK)
4	Aslan Sanakoev (UZB)
5	Pejman Dorostkar (IRI)
6	Alaa Zaghloul (QAT)
7	Boldyn Sainbayar (MGL)
8	Hani Al-Marafi (JOR)
9	Almazbek Ergeshov (KGZ)
10	Anuj Chaudhary (IND)
11	Katsutoshi Semba (JPN)
12	Jumakhan Ahmadi (AFG)
