= Wrestling at the 1998 Asian Games – Men's Greco-Roman 85 kg =

Men's Greco-Roman 85 kg at the 1998 Asian Games
- Venue: Thammasat Gymnasium 1
- Dates: 13–14 December 1998
- Competitors: 9 from 9 nations

Medalists
gold medal	Park Myung-suk	South Korea
silver medal	Raatbek Sanatbayev	Kyrgyzstan
bronze medal	Hidekazu Yokoyama	Japan

The men's Greco-Roman 85 kilograms wrestling competition at the 1998 Asian Games in Bangkok was held on the 13th and 14 December at the Thammasat Gymnasium 1.

The gold and silver medalists were determined by the final match of the main single-elimination bracket. The losers advanced to the repechage. These matches determined the bronze medalist for the event.

== Schedule ==
All times are Indochina Time (UTC+07:00)

Date	Time	Event
Sunday, 13 December 1998	09:00	Round 1
Sunday, 13 December 1998	16:00	Round 2
Monday, 14 December 1998	09:00	Round 3
Monday, 14 December 1998	09:00	Round 4
Monday, 14 December 1998	16:00	Finals

== Results ==
=== Round 1 ===
	Score		CP
1/8 finals
Zafarkhon Achilov (UZB)	3–0	Valeriy Matviyenko (KAZ)	3–0 PO
Raatbek Sanatbayev (KGZ)	4–0 Fall	Ronnachai Sawangpong (THA)	4–0 TO
Mohanad Mando (SYR)	3–0	Rozy Rejepow (TKM)	3–0 PO
Behrouz Jamshidi (IRI)	2–4	Park Myung-suk (KOR)	1–3 PP
Hidekazu Yokoyama (JPN)		Bye	

=== Round 2 ===
	Score		CP
Quarterfinals
Hidekazu Yokoyama (JPN)	0–7	Zafarkhon Achilov (UZB)	0–3 PO
Raatbek Sanatbayev (KGZ)		Bye	
Mohanad Mando (SYR)		Bye	
Park Myung-suk (KOR)		Bye	
Repechage
Valeriy Matviyenko (KAZ)	11–0 Fall	Ronnachai Sawangpong (THA)	4–0 TO
Rozy Rejepow (TKM)	0–4	Behrouz Jamshidi (IRI)	0–3 PO

=== Round 3 ===
	Score		CP
Semifinals
Zafarkhon Achilov (UZB)	0–4	Raatbek Sanatbayev (KGZ)	0–3 PO
Mohanad Mando (SYR)	0–3	Park Myung-suk (KOR)	0–3 PO
Repechage
Valeriy Matviyenko (KAZ)	0–5 Fall	Hidekazu Yokoyama (JPN)	0–4 TO
Behrouz Jamshidi (IRI)		Bye	

=== Round 4 ===
	Score		CP
Repechage
Zafarkhon Achilov (UZB)	0–7	Behrouz Jamshidi (IRI)	0–3 PO
Hidekazu Yokoyama (JPN)	3–0	Mohanad Mando (SYR)	3–0 PO

=== Finals ===
	Score		CP
Bronze medal match
Behrouz Jamshidi (IRI)	2–4	Hidekazu Yokoyama (JPN)	1–3 PP
Gold medal match
Raatbek Sanatbayev (KGZ)	0–2	Park Myung-suk (KOR)	0–3 PO

== Final standing ==
Rank	Athlete
1st place, gold medalist(s)	Park Myung-suk (KOR)
2nd place, silver medalist(s)	Raatbek Sanatbayev (KGZ)
3rd place, bronze medalist(s)	Hidekazu Yokoyama (JPN)
4	Behrouz Jamshidi (IRI)
5	Zafarkhon Achilov (UZB)
6	Mohanad Mando (SYR)
7	Valeriy Matviyenko (KAZ)
8	Ronnachai Sawangpong (THA)
8	Rozy Rejepow (TKM)
