= Jazz Baby =

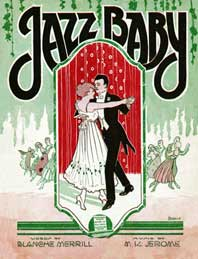

Song
- Recorded: 1919
- Songwriters: Blanche Merrill; M.K. Jerome

Jazz Baby is a song published in 1919, written by Blanche Merrill and M.K. Jerome, and recorded by singer Marion Harris.

The rights to the song were acquired by the Washburn-Crosby Company, manufacturers of Wheaties cereal, in 1926, for the purpose of using it as an advertising jingle. Many different lyrics promoting the cereal were applied to the tune over the next few generations.

The song was revived in its original form and context for the 1967 musical film Thoroughly Modern Millie, sung by Carol Channing.

It is on the album from Lieut. Jim Europe's 369th U.S. Infantry ("Hell Fighters") Band, vocals by C. Creighton Thompson, recorded March 14, 1919, from James Reese Europe and the 369th US Infantry "Hell Fighters" Band, featuring Noble Sissle, the Complete Pathe Recordings – 1919, IAJRC CD 1012, 1996.
