= Wheaties =

Breakfast cereal made by General Mills

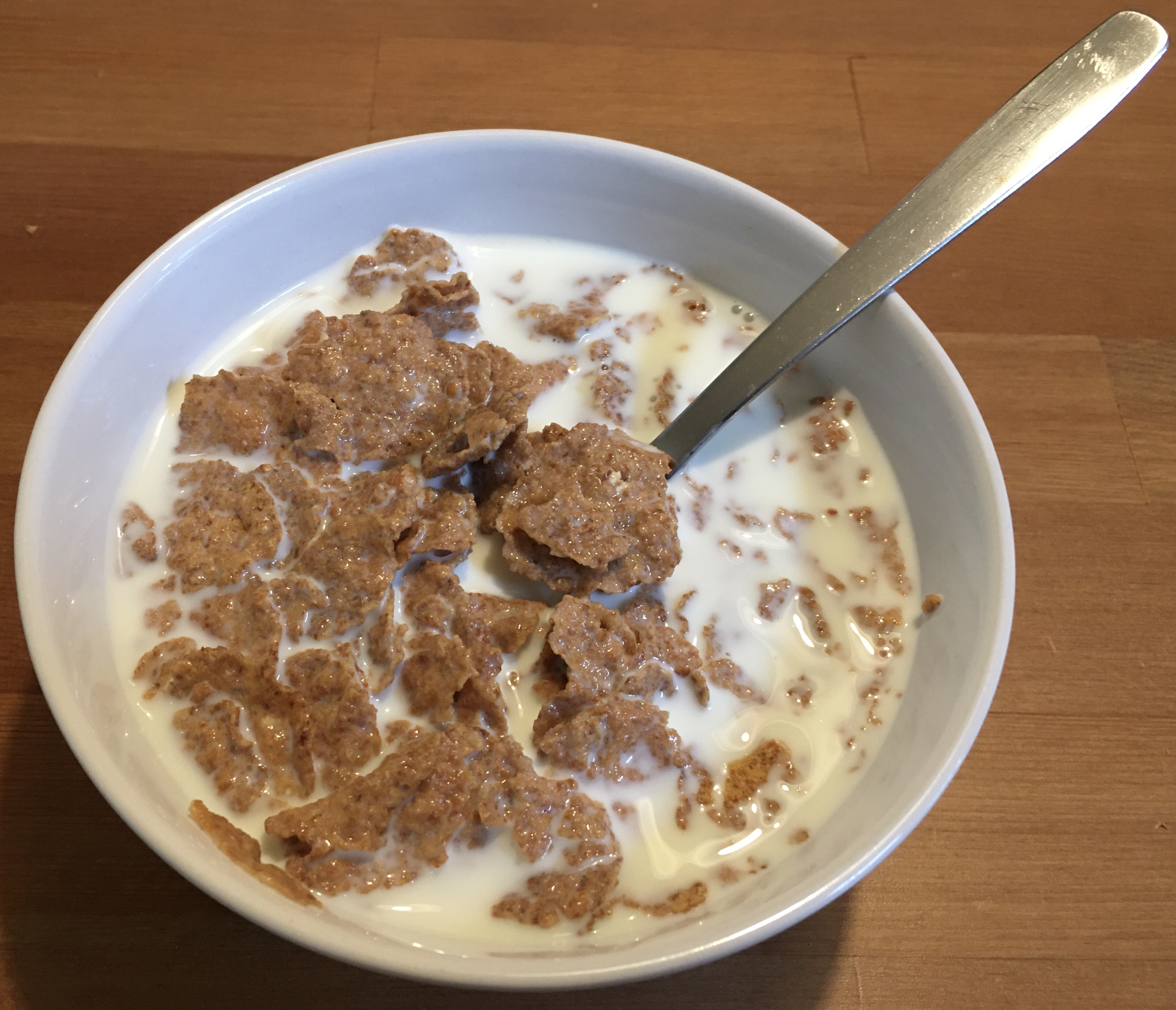
- Bowl of Wheaties cereal with milk
- Product type: Breakfast cereal
- Current owner: General Mills
- Country: United States
- Introduced: November 1924; 102 years ago
- Markets: United States
- Tagline: "The breakfast of Champions"
- Website: wheaties.com

Wheaties is an American brand of breakfast cereal that is made by General Mills. It is notable for featuring prominent athletes on its packages. Originally introduced as Washburn's Gold Medal Whole Wheat Flakes in 1924, it is primarily a wheat and bran mixture baked into flakes.

== History ==
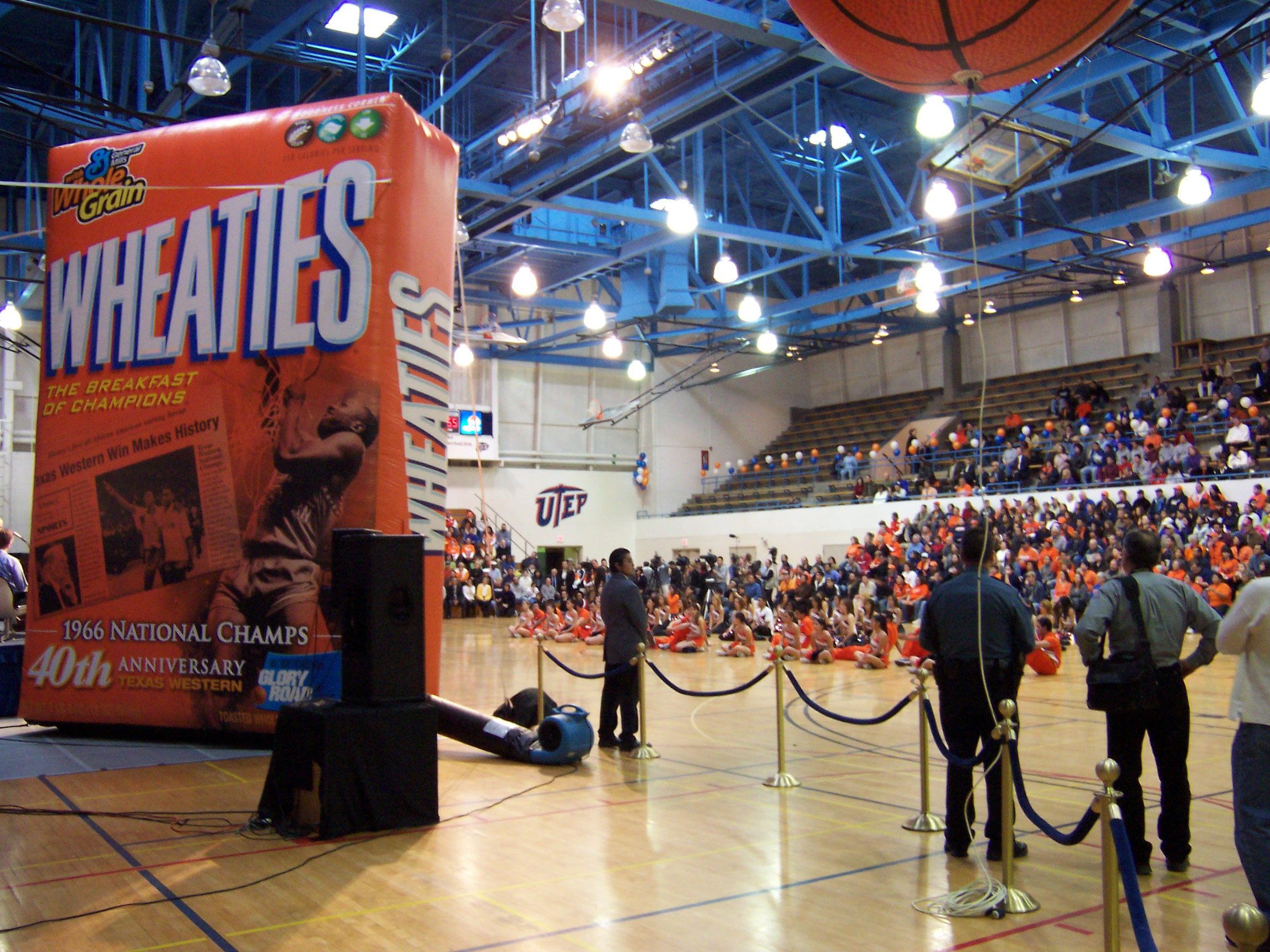
A blow-up model of a Wheaties box to commemorate the opening of Glory Road on the UTEP campus, November 29, 2005. 1966 NCAA basketball championship team members Willie Worsley and Nevil Shedd, are pictured on the box, cutting down the hoop net.

=== Creation ===
Wheaties was created in 1921, as a result of an accidental spill of a wheat bran mixture onto a hot stove by a Minnesota clinician working for the Washburn Crosby Company (later General Mills). By November 1924, after more than 36 attempts to strengthen the flakes to withstand packaging, the process for creating the flakes had been perfected by the Washburn head miller, George Cormack, and the cereal was named Washburn's Gold Medal Whole Wheat Flakes. Soon after, the name was changed to Wheaties as a result of an employee contest won by Jane Bausman, the wife of a company export manager. Other names passed over included "Nutties" and "Gold Medal Wheat Flakes."

Wheaties began to be advertised on Minneapolis's WCCO radio station (owned by Washburn Crosby) on December 24, 1926, with the first-ever pre-recorded commercial jingle. Its lyrics were sung to the tune of the then-popular "She's a Jazz Baby" by Bill Holcombe and David Miller or possibly to the tune of "Jazz Baby":

Have you tried Wheaties?
They're whole wheat with all of the bran.
Won't you try Wheaties?
For wheat is the best food of man.
They're crispy and crunchy
The whole year through.
The kiddies never tire of them
And neither will you.
So just try Wheaties
The best breakfast food in the land.

=== Early sports association ===
Wheaties began its association with sports in 1927, through advertising on the southern wall of minor league baseball's Nicollet Park in Minneapolis, Minnesota. In the contract, Wheaties sponsored the radio broadcasts of the minor league baseball team, Minneapolis Millers, on radio station WCCO and Wheaties was provided with a large billboard in the park to use to introduce new slogans. The first such slogan on the new signboard was penned by Knox Reeves, of a Minneapolis advertising agency. When asked what should be placed on the sign for Wheaties, Reeves sketched a Wheaties box on a pad of paper, thought for a moment, and wrote "Wheaties—The Breakfast of Champions".

Throughout the 1930s, Wheaties increased in popularity with its sponsorship of baseball broadcasting, and by the end of the decade, nearly a hundred radio stations carried Wheaties sponsored events. During these events, athlete testimonials about Wheaties were used to suggest that Wheaties was indeed the breakfast of champions. In 1934, athletes began to be depicted on the Wheaties boxes, starting with baseball star Lou Gehrig, and the tradition continues today.

The heyday of Wheaties came in the 1930s and early 1940s, as testimonials peaked. Among the many testimonials included were baseball stars, managers, and trainers; broadcasters; football stars and coaches; circus stars and rodeo; livestock breeders; a railroad engineer; horsemen and jockeys; a big-game hunter; automobile racers; an aviator; a speedboat driver; an explorer; and parachutists.

In the 1939 baseball All-star game, 46 of the 51 players endorsed the cereal. Shortly thereafter, Wheaties became one of the sponsors of the first televised sports broadcast to allow commercials. On August 29, 1939, NBC television presented the first major league baseball game ever televised, between the Cincinnati Reds and the Brooklyn Dodgers, to approximately 500 television set owners in New York City over experimental station W2XBS (now WNBC). Red Barber was the play-by-play broadcaster. Although full commercial television would not be authorized until July 1, 1941, the FCC allowed commercials to be inserted in this particular, special event broadcast as a test. Barber had to ad-lib three live commercials, one for each Dodger sponsor. For General Mills, he poured Wheaties into a bowl, added milk and sugar on top, then proclaimed "Now that's the breakfast of champions." "There was not a cue card in sight", Barber said.

In 1941 the song "Joltin' Joe DiMaggio" was performed by Les Brown and his orchestra during DiMaggio's record hitting streak. In the song, DiMaggio gets a clutch base hit, and the band awards him "a case of Wheaties".

=== Ties with Ronald Reagan ===
Wheaties radio broadcasting in the 1930s touched the early career of Ronald Reagan, who was at the time a sports broadcast announcer in Des Moines, Iowa. He was asked to create play-by-play recreations of Chicago Cubs baseball games using transcribed telegraph reports; his job performance in this role led to his selection in 1937 as the most popular Wheaties announcer in the nation. He was awarded an all-expenses-paid trip to the Cubs' spring training camp in California, and while there he took a Warner Bros. screen test. This led to his eventual film career.

=== Changes and children's promotions ===
Due to increasing costs in the 1940s of sponsorship of broadcasting, Wheaties began simple commercial sports testimonials on television or radio. In the early 1950s, General Mills redirected its promotional strategy for Wheaties to focus on children, following success in this market with its Cheerios brand. The strategy included sponsorship of The Lone Ranger and The Mickey Mouse Club, as well as the development of a mascot, a puppet character called Champy the Lion, produced by Bil Baird and voiced by Thurl Ravenscroft. Despite these efforts, sales of Wheaties declined dramatically, mainly due to adult consumers' dislike of so-called children's cereals. Children's consumption of Wheaties did in fact increase, but not enough to offset the decline in adult consumption.

=== Return of sports-related promotions ===
In 1958, General Mills decided to combat the decline in sales by returning Wheaties to its sporting roots. A three-pronged marketing strategy was devised. The first element was the selection of the brand's first spokesman, Bob Richards, two-time Olympic pole vault champion. The second was the reentry of Wheaties into the sports television sponsorship arena, pioneering the concepts of the pre-game and post-game show. The third was the creation of the Wheaties Sports Federation. The Wheaties Sports Federation promoted physical fitness, training, and participation in athletic events, through direct financial support of Olympic educational programs and the Jaycee Junior Champ track and field competition, and also through educational and instructional athletic films.

From the 1960s through the 1990s, Wheaties provided in-box promotions but maintained a focus on athletic fitness and on-the-box sports figure promotions. Since the debut of the front cover depiction of Bob Richards, hundreds of athletes have been shown and promoted, including entire baseball, basketball, and football teams, while also highlighting Olympic successes (including regional Special Olympics editions). Wheaties also does not limit itself to current athletic stars, as special edition boxes have depicted baseball players from the early 20th century, and many athletes who were too early for Wheaties to cover (see Jim Thorpe).

=== Other promotions ===
In 2015, General Mills collaborated with Fulton Beer to produce HefeWheaties, a hefeweizen, for limited distribution in the Twin Cities area of Minnesota.

The cereal is referenced in the 2025 Marvel Studios film Thunderbolts*, alongside an appearance in a mid-credits scene. To coincide with the film's release, a collectible cereal box featuring the film's main characters (played by actors such as Florence Pugh, Sebastian Stan and David Harbour) was released.

=== Decline in sales ===
From 2005 to 2014 sales of Wheaties in the U.S. declined 78%.

== Wheaties firsts and records ==
- 1926 – First ever singing radio commercial, using the jingle "Have you tried Wheaties?" (to the tune of Jazz Baby)
- 1934 – First athlete depicted on a Wheaties box – Baseball player Lou Gehrig
- 1934 – First woman depicted on a Wheaties box – Aviator Elinor Smith
- 1935 – First female athlete depicted on a Wheaties box – Golfer and athlete Babe Didrikson Zaharias
- 1936 – First African American athlete on a Wheaties box – Jesse Owens
- 1939 – First televised commercial sports broadcast sponsorship, of the 1939 Major League Baseball All-Star Game
- 1958 – First athlete depicted on the front of a Wheaties box – Pole vaulter Bob Richards
- 1969 – First male golfer depicted on the front of a Wheaties box – Lee Trevino
- 1984 – First woman athlete depicted on the front of a Wheaties box – Gymnast Mary Lou Retton
- 1984 – First high school athlete depicted on the front of a Wheaties box – Chris Spielman
- 1986 – First NFL player depicted on the front of a Wheaties box – Walter Payton
- 1988 – First cyclist depicted on the front of a Wheaties box – Doug Smith
- 1987 – First team depicted on a Wheaties box – 1987 World Series Champion Minnesota Twins
- 1991 – First ice hockey team depicted on a Wheaties box – 1991 Stanley Cup Champion Pittsburgh Penguins
- 1992 – First non-orange Wheaties box, colored red and black in honor of the Chicago Bulls
- 1997 – First automobile race driver depicted on the front of a Wheaties box – Dale Earnhardt
- 1999 – First professional wrestler depicted on the front of a Wheaties box – Stone Cold Steve Austin
- 2001 – First sambo wrestler featured on Wheaties boxes (Wheaties Energy Crunch) – James Chico Hernandez
- 2002 – First university wrestler featured on Wheaties boxes – Cael Sanderson
- 2005 – First women professional sports team to appear on Wheaties box – Sacramento Monarchs
- 2006 – First college football rivalry to appear on Wheaties box – State Farm Lone Star Showdown, the rivalry between the Texas A&M Aggies and the Texas Longhorns
- 2012 – 9-year-old Samantha Gordon is the first female football player to be featured on a Wheaties box.
- 2014 – First Mixed Martial Arts fighter depicted on the front of the Wheaties box – Anthony Pettis
- 2016 – First motocross racer to appear on Wheaties box – Ryan Dungey
- 2023 – First brothers to appear together on Wheaties box – NFL players J. J. and T. J. Watt
- Michael Jordan holds the record for most depictions on a Wheaties box, a total of 18 times, followed by Tiger Woods at 14 times.

== Taglines ==
- Eaties For Wheaties
- The Breakfast of Champions
- You Better Eat Your Wheaties

== Spokespersons ==
There have been a total of seven spokespersons for the Wheaties brand since 1958, listed here with their date of selection:

- Bob Richards – 1958
- Bruce Jenner (now known as Caitlyn) – 1977
- Mary Lou Retton – 1984
- Walter Payton – 1986
- Chris Evert – 1987
- Michael Jordan – 1988
- Tiger Woods – 1998

== Related cereals ==
Like many popular cereal brands from the early 20th century, Wheaties has had its share of spin-off brands. Also, several athletes featured on the cereal boxes of regular Wheaties are featured on these brands. These are the four spin-off brands which have been created for Wheaties, along with their introduction date:

- Honey Frosted Wheaties (Commonly abbreviated HFW) – 1996
- Crispy Wheaties 'n' Raisins (Commonly abbreviated CWR) – 1996
- Wheaties Energy Crunch (Commonly abbreviated WEC) – 2002
- Wheaties Fuel – 2009

=== Australia and New Zealand ===
In Australia and New Zealand, the spelling is 'Weeties'. Variants are made by Sanitarium and the General Mills/Nestlé subsidiary Uncle Tobys.

== See also ==
- List of athletes on Wheaties boxes
- List of breakfast cereals
