= Siarhei Borchanka =

Belarusian freestyle wrestler

Personal information
- Full name: Siarhei Mikalaievich Borchanka
- Nationality: Belarus
- Born: 30 January 1976 (age 50) Grodno, Belarusian SSR, Soviet Union
- Height: 1.84 m (6 ft 1/2 in)
- Weight: 84 kg (185 lb)

Sport
- Style: Freestyle
- Club: Dynamo Hrodna
- Coach: Stsiapan Buikevich

Siarhei Mikalaievich Borchanka (Belarusian: Сяргей Мікалаевіч Борчанка; born January 30, 1976, in Grodno) is a retired amateur Belarusian freestyle wrestler, who competed in the men's light heavyweight category. He finished fourth in the 84-kg division at the 2003 World Wrestling Championships in New York City, New York, United States, and later represented his nation Belarus at the 2004 Summer Olympics. Borchanka also trained as a member of the freestyle wrestling team for Dynamo Hrodna, under his personal coach Stsiapan Buikevich.

Borchanka qualified for the Belarusian squad in the men's light heavyweight class (84 kg) at the 2004 Summer Olympics in Athens, by placing fourth and receiving a berth from the World Championships a year earlier. Borchanka dismantled Kazakhstan's Magomed Kurugliyev on his opening bout with a 2–1 decision, but could not push U.S. wrestler and 2003 world silver medalist Cael Sanderson off the mat, and suffered a defeat by a 1–9 blowout at the end of the tournament. Finishing second in the prelim pool and fourteenth overall, Borchanka's performance fell short to put him through to the quarterfinals.
