= Lazaros Loizidis =

Greek freestyle wrestler (born 1976)

Lazaros Loizidis (Greek: Λάζαρος Λοϊζίδης, born 16 December 1976 in Taldykorgan) is a Greek former wrestler who competed in the 1996 Summer Olympics and in the 2004 Summer Olympics. He competed in the 74–85 kg category. Bronze medalist of the European Championships in 2004 and 2005. Silver medalist of the Mediterranean in 1997, 2001 and 2005. The third in the Junior World Cup in 1994. Also he is the brother Nikolaos Loizidis wrestler and Olympian from Sydney 2000.
