= Sazhid Sazhidov =

Russian Olympic wrestler (born 1980)

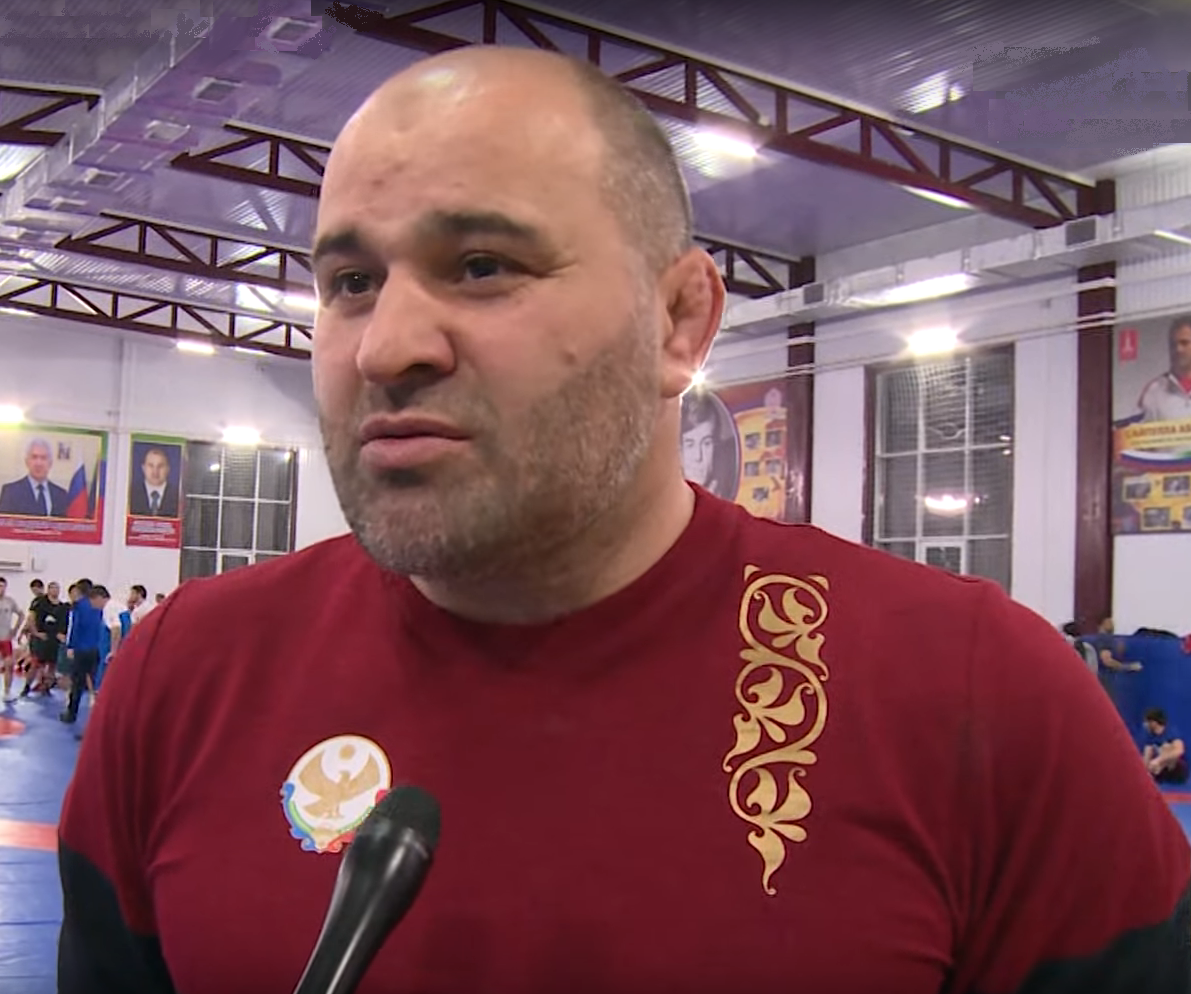
- Sazhidov in 2020

Personal information
- Native name: Сажид Халилрахманович Сажидов
- Full name: Sazhid Khalilrakhmanovich Sazhidov
- Nationality: Russian
- Born: 6 February 1980 (age 46) Agvali, Dagestan ASSR, Russian SFSR, Soviet Union
- Height: 1.77 m (5 ft 10 in)
- Weight: 84 kg (185 lb)

Sport
- Country: Russia
- Sport: Wrestling
- Event: Freestyle
- Coached by: Mairbek Yusupov
Medal record
Representing Russia
Men's freestyle wrestling
Olympic Games
Bronze medal – third place	2004 Athens	84 kg
World Championships
Gold medal – first place	2003 New York	84 kg
Gold medal – first place	2006 Guangzhou	84 kg
European Championships
Gold medal – first place	Budapest 2001	85 kg
Gold medal – first place	Baku 2002	84 kg

Sazhid Khalilrakhmanovich Sazhidov (Russian: Сажид Халилрахманович Сажидов; born 6 February 1980) is a Russian Olympic wrestler who represented his country at the world-level from 2003 to 2006. He won the bronze medal at the 2004 Athens Olympics.

At the final match 2003 FILA Wrestling World Championships he defeated Cael Sanderson of the United States, to become world champion. In 2006 he defeated Revaz Mindorashvili in the final match to again become world champ. In 2005 he placed 5th.

Sazhidov also won the world championship at the cadet level in 1995 and junior level in 1998. He won the World Military Games in 2007 as well.

He is the head coach of the Dagestan wrestling team.

== Notable students ==
- Abdulrashid Sadulaev – Olympic gold medalist, three-time World Champion
- Abdusalam Gadisov (formerly) – World Champion
- Bekkhan Goygereev – World Champion
- Magomedrasul Gazimagomedov - World Champion
- Nariman Israpilov – European Champion and World Freestyle Wrestling Championships Bronze medalist
- Shamil Kudiyamagomedov – Silver World Cup and European Champion
- Gadzhimurad Rashidov (formerly) – Senior European Champion, silver world cup, two-time Cadet World Champion, senior World runner-up
- Ilyas Bekbulatov – European champion and four‐time Ivan Yarygin winner
- Dauren Kurugliev (formerly) – European Champion, Ramzan Kadyrov runner-up & Ali Aliyev Memorial runner-up
- Akhmed Chakaev – Ali Aliyev Memorial winner, senior world 3rd
- Aaron Pico (formerly) – Junior Freestyle Wrestling Championships runner-up and runner-up U.S. Olympic and world team trials
- Khabib Nurmagomedov (formerly) – Two-time world sambo champion and former UFC lightweight champion
