= Majid Khodaei =

Iranian freestyle wrestler

Medal record

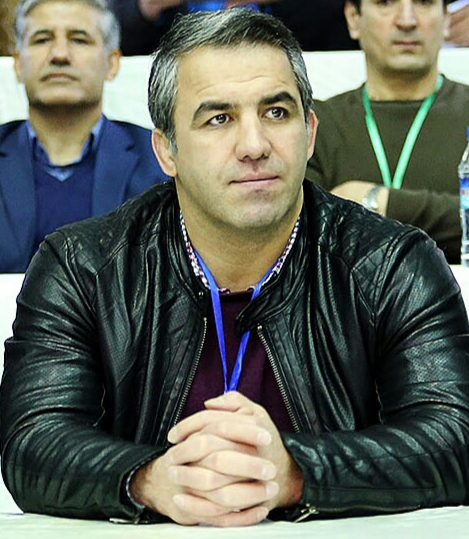
Representing Majid khodaei

Men's freestyle wrestling

World Championships
Bronze medal – third place	2002 Tehran	84 kg

Asian Championships
Bronze medal – third place	2006 Almaty	84 kg

Summer Universiade
Silver medal – second place	2005 Izmir	84 kg

Majid Khodaei (Persian: مجید خدایی, born 26 August 1978 in Mashhad) is an Iranian former wrestler.

== Other Tournaments ==
He participated at the following other tournaments:

- 2001 World Wrestling Championships finished 14th at 84 kg Freestyle.
- 2003 World Wrestling Championships
- 2004 Summer Olympics finished 5th at 84 kg Freestyle.
