= Mamed Aghaev =

Russian wrestler (born 1976)

Mahmed Aghaev
Personal information
- Born: 26 May 1976 (age 50) Urus-Martan, Checheno-Ingush Autonomous Soviet Socialist Republic, RSFSR, USSR
- Height: 1.77 m (5 ft 9 1/2 in)
- Weight: 84 kg (185 lb)

Sport
- Sport: Wrestling
- Event: Freestyle
- Club: Ajastam Armenia
- Coached by: Grant Yenokyan; Araik Baghdadyan
Medal record
Men's freestyle wrestling
Representing Armenia
European Championships
| Silver medal – second place | 2003 Riga | 84 kg |

Mamed Aghaev (born 26 May 1976) is a retired Russian-born freestyle wrestler of Chechen descent. He switched to the Armenian national wrestling team in 1999. Aghaev began wrestling in 1987 and was part of the Ajastam Armenia club in Vanadzor. He won a silver medal at the 2003 European Wrestling Championships in Riga and competed at the 2004 Summer Olympics in Athens.
