= Nicolae Ghiță =

Romanian freestyle wrestler (born 1967)

Nicolae Ghiţă (born 16 November 1967) is a Romanian former wrestler who competed in the 1992 Summer Olympics, in the 1996 Summer Olympics, in the 2000 Summer Olympics, and in the 2004 Summer Olympics.
