= Judo at the 1988 Summer Olympics – Men's 78 kg =

Judo at the Olympics

Men's 78 kg at the Games of the XXIV Olympiad
- Venue: Jangchung Gymnasium
- Date: 28 September 1988
- Competitors: 41 from 41 nations

Medalists
1st place, gold medalist(s)		Waldemar Legień	Poland
2nd place, silver medalist(s)		Frank Wieneke	West Germany
3rd place, bronze medalist(s)		Torsten Bréchôt	East Germany
3rd place, bronze medalist(s)		Bashir Varaev	Soviet Union

The men's 78 kg competition in judo at the 1988 Summer Olympics in Seoul was held on 28 September at the Jangchung Gymnasium. The gold medal was won by Waldemar Legień of Poland.

== Results ==
=== Pool A ===
Round of 64
Peter Reiter (AUT)	R
Frank Wieneke (FRG)	IPO
Victorino González (ESP)	IPO
James Kihara (KEN)	E
Pascal Tayot (FRA)	WIP
Fadi Saikali (LIB)	E
Torsten Bréchôt (GDR)	IPO
Ezequiel Paraguassu (BRA)	E
Rodnomyn Erkhembayar (MGL)	IPO
Simione Kuruvoli (FIJ)	E

Round of 32
Frank Wieneke (FRG)	YUK
Lars Adolfsson (SWE)	R
Victorino González (ESP)	WIP
Luis Ochoa (COL)	E
Pascal Tayot (FRA)	IPO
Ricardo José Boy (ANG)	E
Filip Leščak (YUG)	E
Hirotaka Okada (JPN)	YUK
Torsten Bréchôt (GDR)	IPO
John Baylon (PHI)	E
Pedro Cristóvão (POR)	E
Neil Adams (GBR)	IPO
Rodnomyn Erkhembayar (MGL)	WAZ
Carlos Huttich (MEX)	E
Mariano Aquino (GUM)	E
Hisham Al-Sharaf Rashad (KUW)	IPO

Round of 16
Frank Wieneke (FRG)	IPO
Victorino González (ESP)	R
Pascal Tayot (FRA)	IPO
Hirotaka Okada (JPN)	E
Torsten Bréchôt (GDR)	KOK
Neil Adams (GBR)	E
Rodnomyn Erkhembayar (MGL)	SHI
Hisham Al-Sharaf Rashad (KUW)	E

Quarterfinal
Frank Wieneke (FRG)	KOK
Pascal Tayot (FRA)	R
Torsten Bréchôt (GDR)	WIP
Rodnomyn Erkhembayar (MGL)	E

Semifinal
Frank Wieneke (FRG)	KOK
Torsten Bréchôt (GDR)	R

=== Pool B ===
Round of 64
Olivier Schaffter (SUI)	E
Jason Morris (USA)	KEI
Jukka-Pekka Metsola (FIN)	CHU
Mamudu Adamu (NGR)	E
Károly Németh (HUN)	E
Walid Mohamed Hussain (EGY)	KOK
An Byeong-geun (KOR)	IPO
Johan Laats (BEL)	E

Round of 32
Jason Morris (USA)	E
Bashir Varaev (URS)	YUS
Temel Çakiroglu (TUR)	YUS
Luis Val (AUS)	E
Jukka-Pekka Metsola (FIN)	IPO
Kilmar Campos (VEN)	E
Patrick Matangi (ZIM)	IPO
Tsay Yow-tayn (TPE)	E
Walid Mohamed Hussain (EGY)	R
Waldemar Legień (POL)	WIP
Aly Attyé (SEN)	E
Gastón García (ARG)	IPO
An Byeong-geun (KOR)	E
Kevin Doherty (CAN)	KEI
Lam Lap Hing (HKG)	IPO
Magnus Büchel (LIE)	E

Round of 16
Bashir Varaev (URS)	SOG
Temel Çakiroglu (TUR)	E
Jukka-Pekka Metsola (FIN)	IPO
Patrick Matangi (ZIM)	E
Waldemar Legień (POL)	IPO
Gastón García (ARG)	R
Kevin Doherty (CAN)	IPO
Lam Lap Hing (HKG)	E

Quarterfinal
Bashir Varaev (URS)	IPO
Jukka-Pekka Metsola (FIN)	R
Waldemar Legień (POL)	WAZ
Kevin Doherty (CAN)	R

Semifinal
Bashir Varaev (URS)	R
Waldemar Legień (POL)	YUS

=== Repechages ===
Repechage
Peter Reiter (AUT)	E
Lars Adolfsson (SWE)	WAZ

Repechage quarterfinal
Lars Adolfsson (SWE)	E
Victorino González (ESP)	IPO

Repechage semifinal
Victorino González (ESP)	E
Pascal Tayot (FRA)	WAZ

Repechage final
Pascal Tayot (FRA)	E
Torsten Bréchôt (GDR)	WAZ (bronze)

Repechage

Repechage quarterfinal
Walid Mohamed Hussain (EGY)	E
Gastón García (ARG)	WIP

Repechage semifinal
Gastón García (ARG)	E
Kevin Doherty (CAN)	CHU

Repechage final
Kevin Doherty (CAN)	E
Bashir Varaev (URS)	IPO (bronze)

=== Final ===
Final
Frank Wieneke (FRG)	2nd place, silver medalist(s)
Waldemar Legień (POL)	IPO (gold)

== Final classification ==
Rank	Name	Country
1	Waldemar Legień	Poland
2	Frank Wieneke	West Germany
3T	Torsten Bréchôt	East Germany
3T	Bashir Varaev	Soviet Union
5T	Kevin Doherty	Canada
5T	Pascal Tayot	France
7T	Gastón García	Argentina
7T	Victorino González	Spain
9T	Walid Mohamed Hussain	Egypt
9T	Lars Adolfsson	Sweden
11	Peter Reiter	Austria
12T	Rodnomyn Erkhembayar	Mongolia
12T	Jukka-Pekka Metsola	Finland
14T	Hirotaka Okada	Japan
14T	Neil Adams	Great Britain
14T	Hisham Al-Sharaf Rashad	Kuwait
14T	Temel Çakiroglu	Turkey
14T	Patrick Matangi	Zimbabwe
14T	Lam Lap Hing	Hong Kong
20T	Luis Ochoa	Colombia
20T	Ricardo José Boy	Angola
20T	Filip Leščak	Yugoslavia
20T	John Baylon	Philippines
20T	Pedro Cristóvão	Portugal
20T	Carlos Huttich	Mexico
20T	Mariano Aquino	Guam
20T	Jason Morris	United States
20T	Luis Val	Australia
20T	Kilmar Campos	Venezuela
20T	Tsay Yow-tayn	Chinese Taipei
20T	Magnus Büchel	Liechtenstein
20T	Aly Attyé	Senegal
20T	An Byeong-geun	South Korea
34T	Olivier Schaffter	Switzerland
34T	James Kihara	Kenya
34T	Mamudu Adamu	Nigeria
34T	Fadi Saikali	Lebanon
34T	Károly Németh	Hungary
34T	Ezequiel Paraguassu	Brazil
34T	Johan Laats	Belgium
34T	Simione Kuruvoli	Fiji
