= Judo at the 1984 Summer Olympics – Men's 78 kg =

Judo at the Olympics

Men's 78 kg at the Games of the XXIII Olympiad
- Venue: California State University, Los Angeles
- Date: 7 August 1984
- Competitors: 38 from 38 nations

Medalists
1st place, gold medalist(s)		Frank Wieneke	West Germany
2nd place, silver medalist(s)		Neil Adams	Great Britain
3rd place, bronze medalist(s)		Mircea Frățică	Romania
3rd place, bronze medalist(s)		Michel Nowak	France

The men's 78 kg competition in judo at the 1984 Summer Olympics in Los Angeles was held on 7 August at the California State University. The gold medal was won by Frank Wieneke of West Germany.

== Results ==
=== Pool A ===
Round of 64
António Roquete (POR)	W
Javier Condor (CRC)	E
Fridtjof Thoen (NOR)	E
Javier Condor (CRC)	W
Filip Lešcak (YUG)	WO
Adrian Sierra (HON)	DNS
Rob Henneveld (NED)	WO
Jaime Casanova (DOM)	DNS
Graeme Spinks (NZL)	E
Michel Nowak (FRA)	W

Round of 32
António Roquete (POR)	IPO
Abdoulaye Diallo (GUI)	E
Süheyl Yesilnur (TUR)	IPO
Ignacio Sanz (ESP)	E
Filip Lešcak (YUG)	WAZ
Rogério dos Santos (BRA)	E
Ioannis Kougialis (CYP)	E
Ousseynou Guèye (SEN)	IPO
Rob Henneveld (NED)	R
Neil Adams (GBR)	IPO
Sayed Al-Tubaikh (KUW)	E
Brett Barron (USA)	IPO
Michel Nowak (FRA)	IPO
Moshe Ponte (ISR)	E
Seppo Myllylä (FIN)	IPO
Asafu Tembo (ZAM)	E

Round of 16
António Roquete (POR)	E
Süheyl Yesilnur (TUR)	KOK
Filip Lešcak (YUG)	WAZ
Ousseynou Guèye (SEN)	E
Neil Adams (GBR)	IPO
Brett Barron (USA)	R
Michel Nowak (FRA)	SOG
Seppo Myllylä (FIN)	E

Quarterfinal
Süheyl Yesilnur (TUR)	E
Filip Lešcak (YUG)	IPO
Neil Adams (GBR)	KOK
Michel Nowak (FRA)	R

Semifinal
Filip Lešcak (YUG)	R
Neil Adams (GBR)	KOK

=== Pool B ===
Round of 64
Mircea Frățică (ROU)	W
Li Chung Tai (HKG)	E
Jean-Marie Dedecker (BEL)	DNS
Thomas Haasmann (AUT)	WO
Massimo Marcelli (ITA)	DNS
Jorge Bonnet (PUR)	WO
Gaston Oula (CIV)	R
Frank Wieneke (FRG)	W
Hwang Jin-su (KOR)	E
Carlos Huttich (MEX)	W

Round of 32
Mircea Frățică (ROU)	IPO
Paul Diop (MLI)	E
Thomas Haasmann (AUT)	E
Per Kjellin (SWE)	KOK
Jorge Bonnet (PUR)	WIP
Christophe Wogo (CGO)	E
Jules-Albert Ndemba (CMR)	IPO
Mohamed Maach (MAR)	E
Frank Wieneke (FRG)	YUK
Hiromitsu Takano (JPN)	R
Simione Kuruvoli (FIJ)	E
Walid Mohamed Hussain (EGY)	IPO
Carlos Huttich (MEX)	E
Liu Junlin (CHN)	KOK
Kevin Doherty (CAN)	YUK
Sun Yih-shong (TPE)	E

Round of 16
Mircea Frățică (ROU)	YUK
Per Kjellin (SWE)	E
Jorge Bonnet (PUR)	IPO
Jules-Albert Ndemba (CMR)	E
Frank Wieneke (FRG)	WAZ
Walid Mohamed Hussain (EGY)	R
Liu Junlin (CHN)	E
Kevin Doherty (CAN)	IPO

Quarterfinal
Mircea Frățică (ROU)	IPO
Jorge Bonnet (PUR)	E
Frank Wieneke (FRG)	KOK
Kevin Doherty (CAN)	R

Semifinal
Mircea Frățică (ROU)	R
Frank Wieneke (FRG)	YUS

=== Repechages ===
Repechage		Repechage semifinal		Repechage final
Rob Henneveld (NED)	KOK
Brett Barron (USA)	E	Rob Henneveld (NED)	E
		Michel Nowak (FRA)	YUS
				Michel Nowak (FRA)	YUK (bronze)
				Filip Lešcak (YUG)	E

Repechage
Gaston Oula (CIV)	E
Hiromitsu Takano (JPN)	IPO

Repechage quarterfinal
Hiromitsu Takano (JPN)	YUK
Walid Mohamed Hussain (EGY)	E

Repechage semifinal
Hiromitsu Takano (JPN)	YUS
Kevin Doherty (CAN)	E

Repechage final
Hiromitsu Takano (JPN)	E
Mircea Frățică (ROU)	KOK (bronze)

=== Final ===
Final
Neil Adams (GBR)	2nd place, silver medalist(s)
Frank Wieneke (FRG)	IPO (gold)

== Final classification ==
Rank	Judoka	Nation
1st place, gold medalist(s)	Frank Wieneke	West Germany
2nd place, silver medalist(s)	Neil Adams	Great Britain
3rd place, bronze medalist(s)	Mircea Frățică	Romania
3rd place, bronze medalist(s)	Michel Nowak	France
5T	Filip Lešcak	Yugoslavia
5T	Hiromitsu Takano	Japan
7T	Kevin Doherty	Canada
7T	Rob Henneveld	Netherlands
9T	Brett Barron	United States
9T	Walid Mohamed Hussain	Egypt
11	Gaston Oula	Ivory Coast
12T	Süheyl Yesilnur	Turkey
12T	Jorge Bonnet	Puerto Rico
14T	António Roquete	Portugal
14T	Ousseynou Guèye	Senegal
14T	Liu Junlin	China
14T	Seppo Myllylä	Finland
14T	Per Kjellin	Sweden
14T	Jules-Albert Ndemba	Cameroon
20T	Abdoulaye Diallo	Guinea
20T	Ignacio Sanz	Spain
20T	Rogério dos Santos	Brazil
20T	Ioannis Kougialis	Cyprus
20T	Sun Yih-shong	Chinese Taipei
20T	Sayed Al-Tubaikh	Kuwait
20T	Moshe Ponte	Israel
20T	Asafu Tembo	Zambia
20T	Paul Diop	Mali
20T	Thomas Haasmann	Austria
20T	Christophe Wogo	Republic of the Congo
20T	Mohamed Maach	Morocco
20T	Carlos Huttich	Mexico
20T	Simione Kuruvoli	Fiji
34T	Javier Condor	Costa Rica
34T	Fridtjof Thoen	Norway
34T	Graeme Spinks	New Zealand
34T	Li Chung Tai	Hong Kong
34T	Hwang Jin-su	South Korea
