= Judo at the 1980 Summer Olympics – Men's 78 kg =

Judo competition

Men's 78kg at the Games of the XXII Olympiad
- Venue: Palace of Sports of the Central Lenin Stadium
- Date: July 29, 1980
- Competitors: 24 from 24 nations

Medalists
1st place, gold medalist(s)		Shota Khabareli	Soviet Union
2nd place, silver medalist(s)		Juan Ferrer	Cuba
3rd place, bronze medalist(s)		Bernard Tchoullouyan	France
3rd place, bronze medalist(s)		Harald Heinke	East Germany

Men's 78 kg competition in Judo at the 1980 Summer Olympics in Moscow, Soviet Union was held at Palace of Sports of the Central Lenin Stadium. The gold medal was won by Shota Khabareli from the Soviet Union.

== Results ==
=== Pool A ===
Round of 32
Christopher Bowles (GBR)	5:00
Philippe Simo (CMR)	E
Bernard Tchoullouyan (FRA)
Bye
Berkane Lakhdar Adda (ALG)	2:07
Jarosław Brawata (POL)	E
António Andrade Roquete (POR)
Bye
Juan Ferrer (CUB)	5:00
David McManus (IRL)	R
Slavko Sikirić (YUG)	5:00
Bye
Ignacio Sanz (ESP)	0:20
Bassam El-Jabbin (SYR)	E
Dovdongiin Dashjamts (MGL)
Bye

Round of 16
Bernard Tchoullouyan (FRA)	5:00
Christopher Bowles (GBR)	E
António Andrade Roquete (POR)	5:00
Berkane Lakhdar Adda (ALG)	E
Juan Ferrer (CUB)	5:00
Slavko Sikirić (YUG)	R
Ignacio Sanz (ESP)	1:31
Dovdongiin Dashjamts (MGL)	E

Quarterfinal
Bernard Tchoullouyan (FRA)	1:54
António Andrade Roquete (POR)	E
Juan Ferrer (CUB)	1:09
Ignacio Sanz (ESP)	R

Semifinal
Juan Ferrer (CUB)	0:28
Bernard Tchoullouyan (FRA)	R

=== Pool B ===
Round of 32
Harald Heinke (GDR)	5:00
Karim Badiane (SEN)	E
Shota Khabareli (URS)
Bye
Vladimír Bárta (TCH)	0:09
Henry Sichalwe (ZAM)	E
Georgi Petrov (BUL)
Bye
Carlos Alberto Cunha (BRA)	5:00
Michel Grant (SWE)	E
Thomas Hagmann (SUI)
Bye
Mircea Frăţică (ROM)	5:00
János Gyáni (HUN)	E
Jang Il Nam (PRK)
Bye

Round of 16
Shota Khabareli (URS)	5:00
Harald Heinke (GDR)	R
Georgi Petrov (BUL)	5:00
Vladimír Bárta (TCH)	E
Carlos Alberto Cunha (BRA)	5:00
Thomas Hagmann (SUI)	E
Mircea Frăţică (ROM)	0:00 wo
Jang Il Nam (PRK)

Quarterfinal
Shota Khabareli (URS)	5:00
Georgi Petrov (BUL)	R
Mircea Frăţică (ROM)	4:12
Carlos Alberto Cunha (BRA)	E

Semifinal
Shota Khabareli (URS)	5:00
Mircea Frăţică (ROM)	R

=== Repechages ===
Repechage quarterfinal		Repechage semifinal		Repechage final
Slavko Sikirić (YUG)	5:00
David McManus (IRL)	E	Ignacio Sanz (ESP)	3:17
		Slavko Sikirić (YUG)	E
				Bernard Tchoullouyan (FRA)	7:00 (bronze)
				Ignacio Sanz (ESP)

Quarterfinals	Repechage semifinal		Repechage final
	Harald Heinke (GDR)	5:00
	Georgi Petrov (BUL)	E
			Harald Heinke (GDR)	7:00 (bronze)
			Mircea Frăţică (ROM)

=== Final ===
Final
Shota Khabareli (URS)	7:00 (gold)
Juan Ferrer (CUB)	2nd place, silver medalist(s)
