= Judo at the 1992 Summer Olympics – Men's 86 kg =

Judo at the Olympics

Men's 86 kg at the Games of the XXV Olympiad
- Venue: Palau Blaugrana
- Date: 29 July 1992
- Competitors: 33 from 33 nations

Medalists
1st place, gold medalist(s)		Waldemar Legień	Poland
2nd place, silver medalist(s)		Pascal Tayot	France
3rd place, bronze medalist(s)		Nicolas Gill	Canada
3rd place, bronze medalist(s)		Hirotaka Okada	Japan

The men's 86 kg competition in judo at the 1992 Summer Olympics in Barcelona was held on 29 July at the Palau Blaugrana. The gold medal was won by Waldemar Legień of Poland.

== Results ==
=== Main brackets ===
==== Pool A ====
Round of 64
Ben Spijkers (NED)	IPO
Filip Lešcak (SLO)	E

Round of 32
Ben Spijkers (NED)	RA
Nicolas Gill (CAN)	WAZ
Jambalyn Ganbold (MGL)	E
Wang Nan (CHN)	IPO
Chris Bacon (AUS)	YUK
Wagner Castropil (BRA)	E
Hirotaka Okada (JPN)	IPO
Rajinder Kumar Dhanger (IND)	E
Yahia Mufarrih (YEM)	E
Nikola Filipov (BUL)	IPO
Waldemar Legień (POL)	IPO
Michael Oduor (KEN)	RA
Hermate Souffrant (HAI)	E
Densign White (GBR)	IPO
Oleg Maltsev (EUN)	E
Yang Jong-ok (KOR)	SHI

Round of 16
Nicolas Gill (CAN)	WAZ
Wang Nan (CHN)	RA
Chris Bacon (AUS)	E
Hirotaka Okada (JPN)	IPO
Nikola Filipov (BUL)	RA
Waldemar Legień (POL)	IPO
Densign White (GBR)	E
Yang Jong-ok (KOR)	YUS

Quarterfinal
Nicolas Gill (CAN)	WAZ
Hirotaka Okada (JPN)	RA
Waldemar Legień (POL)	YUK
Yang Jong-ok (KOR)	RA

Semifinal
Nicolas Gill (CAN)	RB
Waldemar Legień (POL)	YUK

==== Pool B ====
Round of 32
Andrés Franco (CUB)	CHU
Isaac Angbo (CIV)	E
André Mayounga (CAF)	E
Ilualoma Isako (COD)	IPO
Joseph Wanag (USA)	E
Adrian Croitoru (ROU)	IPO
Károly Korbel (HUN)	RB
Pascal Tayot (FRA)	KOK
Sandro López (ARG)	YUS
Aly Attyé (SEN)	E
Pedro Cristóvão (POR)	E
Daniel Kistler (SUI)	KOK
Aporosa Boginisoko (FIJ)	E
Giorgio Vismara (ITA)	IPO
León Villar (ESP)	RB
Axel Lobenstein (GER)	WIP

Round of 16
Andrés Franco (CUB)	IPO
Ilualoma Isako (COD)	E
Adrian Croitoru (ROU)	RB
Pascal Tayot (FRA)	SHI
Sandro López (ARG)	RA
Daniel Kistler (SUI)	IPO
Giorgio Vismara (ITA)	RB
Axel Lobenstein (GER)	SHI

Quarterfinal
Andrés Franco (CUB)	RB
Pascal Tayot (FRA)	KOK
Daniel Kistler (SUI)	RB
Axel Lobenstein (GER)	YUK

Semifinal
Pascal Tayot (FRA)	IPO
Axel Lobenstein (GER)	RA

=== Repechages ===
==== Repechage A ====
Repechage round 1
Ben Spijkers (NED)	YUK
Wang Nan (CHN)	E
Michael Oduor (KEN)	E
Nikola Filipov (BUL)	IPO

Repechage quarterfinal
Ben Spijkers (NED)	E
Hirotaka Okada (JPN)	IPO
Nikola Filipov (BUL)	E
Yang Jong-ok (KOR)	CHU

Repechage semifinal
Hirotaka Okada (JPN)	YUS
Yang Jong-ok (KOR)	E

Repechage final
Hirotaka Okada (JPN)	YUS (bronze)
Axel Lobenstein (GER)	E

==== Repechage B ====
Repechage round 1
Károly Korbel (HUN)	E
Adrian Croitoru (ROU)	YUS
León Villar (ESP)	SHI
Giorgio Vismara (ITA)	E

Repechage quarterfinal
Adrian Croitoru (ROU)	IPO
Andrés Franco (CUB)	E
León Villar (ESP)	E
Daniel Kistler (SUI)	KOK

Repechage semifinal
Adrian Croitoru (ROU)	IPO
Daniel Kistler (SUI)	E

Repechage final
Adrian Croitoru (ROU)	E
Nicolas Gill (CAN)	IPO (bronze)

=== Final ===
Final
Waldemar Legień (POL)	KOK (gold)
Pascal Tayot (FRA)	2nd place, silver medalist(s)

== Final classification ==
Rank	Judoka	Nation
1st place, gold medalist(s)	Waldemar Legień	Poland
2nd place, silver medalist(s)	Pascal Tayot	France
3rd place, bronze medalist(s)	Nicolas Gill	Canada
3rd place, bronze medalist(s)	Hirotaka Okada	Japan
5T	Adrian Croitoru	Romania
5T	Axel Lobenstein	Germany
7T	Daniel Kistler	Switzerland
7T	Yang Jong-ok	South Korea
9T	Ben Spijkers	Netherlands
9T	Nikola Filipov	Bulgaria
9T	Andrés Franco	Cuba
9T	León Villar	Spain
13T	Wang Nan	China
13T	Michael Oduor	Kenya
13T	Károly Korbel	Hungary
13T	Giorgio Vismara	Italy
17T	Chris Bacon	Australia
17T	Densign White	Great Britain
17T	Ilualoma Isako	Zaire
17T	Sandro López	Argentina
21T	Oleg Maltsev	Unified Team
21T	Jambalyn Ganbold	Mongolia
21T	Wagner Castropil	Brazil
21T	Rajinder Kumar Dhanger	India
21T	Yahia Mufarrih	Yemen
21T	Hermate Souffrant	Haiti
21T	Isaac Angbo	Ivory Coast
21T	André Mayounga	Central African Republic
21T	Joseph Wanag	United States
21T	Aly Attyé	Senegal
21T	Pedro Cristóvão	Portugal
21T	Aporosa Boginisoko	Fiji
33T	Filip Lešcak	Slovenia
