= Rogeria =

Rogeria may refer to:

- 920 Rogeria, an asteroid
- Rogeria (ant), a genus of insects in the family Formicidae
- Rogeria (plant), a genus of plants in the family Pedaliaceae

== People ==
- Rogéria (1943–2017), Brazilian actress and drag queen
- Rogéria Bolsonaro (born 1960), Brazilian politician
- Rogéria Gomes (born 1962), Brazilian radio and theatrical producer
- Rogéria Santos (born 1966), Brazilian missionary, lawyer and politician
