= Rogério Santos =

Rogério Santos may refer to:

- Rogério dos Santos (judoka) (born 1962), Brazilian judoka

== See also ==
- Rogério Pinheiro (born 1972), full name Rogério Pinheiro dos Santos, Brazilian footballer
- Rogéria Santos (born 1966), a brazilian politician
