= Moshe Ponte =

Israeli judoka (born 1956)

Personal information
- Native name: משה פונטי
- Born: 29 August 1956 (age 69)
- Occupations: President, Israel Judo Association
- Height: 180 cm (5 ft 11 in)

Sport
- Country: Israel
- Sport: Judo
- Weight class: ‍–‍78 kg
- Rank: 7th dan black belt
- Coached by: Maurice Smadja

Achievements and titles
- Olympic Games: R32 (1984)
- World Champ.: R16 (1983)
- European Champ.: 9th (1982)

Profile at external databases
- IJF: 3202
- JudoInside.com: 25367
- Updated on 22 August 2023

Moshe Ponte (also "Ponti"; Hebrew: משה פונטי; born 29 August 1956) is an Israeli former Olympic judoka and current president of the Israel Judo Association.

Ponte was born in Israel, and is Jewish.

== Judo career ==
Ponte's coach was Maurice Smadja.

Ponte competed for Israel at the 1984 Summer Olympics in Los Angeles, California, in judo. In the men's half-middleweight (‍–‍78 kg) he came in tied for 20th, after losing to Michel Nowak of France, who won the bronze medal. When Ponte competed in the Olympics he was 5 ft 10.5 in (179 cm) tall, and weighed 172 lb (78 kg).

Ponte won a silver medal at the Belgian Open Championships Visé in 1986 in the ‍–‍86 kg category.

Ponte coached Israeli Olympic bronze medalist Oren Smadja.

Ponte is the president of the Israel Judo Association.

== See also ==
- List of select Jewish judokas
