= Peter Reiter =

Peter Reiter can refer to:

- Peter Reiter (footballer) (1937–2007)
- Peter Reiter (judoka) (born 1960)
