= Temel =

Temel is a Turkish given name for males. People named Temel include:

- Hikmet Temel Akarsu (born 1960), Turkish novelist, short-story writer, satirist and playwright
- Temel Çakiroglu (born 1959), Turkish judoka
- Temel Kotil (born 1959), Turkish aeronautical engineer
