= Torsten Bréchôt =

German judoka (born 1964)

Personal information
- Born: 11 September 1964 (age 61) Schwerin, East Germany
- Occupation: Judoka

Sport
- Country: East Germany
- Sport: Judo
- Weight class: ‍–‍78 kg

Achievements and titles
- Olympic Games: (bronze) (1988)
- World Champ.: (silver) (1985)
- European Champ.: 5th (1988)
Medal record
Men's judo
Representing East Germany
Olympic Games
Bronze medal – third place	1988 Seoul	‍–‍78 kg
World Championships
Silver medal – second place	1985 Seoul	‍–‍78 kg
European Junior Championships
Gold medal – first place	1983 Arnhem	‍–‍78 kg

Profile at external databases
- IJF: 53808
- JudoInside.com: 5579
- Updated on 6 June 2023

Torsten Bréchôt (né Oehmigen, born 11 September 1964 in Schwerin, Bezirk Schwerin) is a male retired judoka from Germany, who competed for East Germany at the 1988 Summer Olympics in Seoul, South Korea. There he won a bronze medal in the Men's Half-Middleweight (‍–‍78 kg) division after being defeated in the semi-finals by West Germany's eventual silver medalist Frank Wieneke.

With a birth name of Oehmigen, he took on his wife's surname in 1985.
