= Christopher Bowles =

British judoka (born 1957)

Personal information
- Nationality: British
- Born: 19 September 1957 (age 68)
- Occupation: Judoka

Sport
- Sport: Judo
Medal record
Representing Great Britain
European Championships
Silver medal – second place	1980 Vienna	–71 kg

Profile at external databases
- JudoInside.com: 4901

Christopher Bowles (born 9 September 1957) is a British judoka. He competed in the men's half-middleweight event at the 1980 Summer Olympics.

== Judo career ==
Bowles became champion of Great Britain, winning the light-middleweight division at the British Judo Championships in 1979. The following year he won a silver medal at the 1980 European Judo Championships in Vienna, competing in the under 71 kg division he lost the gold medal match to Nicolae Vlad of Romania.

In 1980, he was selected to represent Great Britain at the 1980 Summer Olympics, competing in the men's 78 kg division he failed to progress from Pool A after losing his second match to Bernard Tchoullouyan.
