= Varayev =

Varayev or Varaev (Russian: Вараев) is a Chechen masculine surname, its feminine counterpart is Varayeva or Varaeva. It may refer to

- Adlan Varayev (1962–2016), Russian-Chechen wrestler
- Bashir Varaev (born 1964), Chechen judoka
