= Branislav Crnogorac =

Bosnian judoka

Branislav Brane Crnogorac
Personal information
- Nationality: Bosnian
- Born: 11 July 1952 (age 73) Zrenjanin, SR Serbia, SFR Yugoslavia
- Home town: Sarajevo
- Education: University of Sarajevo
- Occupation(s): judoka trainer, educator

Sport
- Country: Bosnia and Herzegovina
- Sport: Judo
- Weight class: Lightweight
- Rank: 7th dan black belt
- League: Republička and Savzna Liga
- Club: Bosna
- Now coaching: Vinko Šamarlić
- Updated on June 2023

Branislav Brane Crnogorac (born 11 July 1952 in Zrenjanin, SR Serbia, SFR Yugoslavia) is a Bosnian judoka and judo trainer. Crnogorac was a long-term president of the Judo Association of Bosnia and Herzegovina and the national team selector and trainer. He is currently vice-president of the Judo Association. He is the recipient of the highest decoration awarded by the Government of Japan, the Autumn Imperial Decorations, for 2020.

== Career ==
=== Public service ===
Crnogorac is a teacher of martial sports at the Faculty of Sport and Physical Education of the University of Travnik and at the Faculty of Pedagogy of the University of Bihać. He is the author of several scientific research papers on the subject of sport culture and martial arts. He was employed in the Ministry of Culture and Sports of the Sarajevo Canton, and a representative in the cantonal Assembly. He was also a representative at the House of Peoples of the Federation of Bosnia and Herzegovina. He held the position of president of the Commission for Youth in the Assembly of the Sarajevo Canton and chairman of the Committee for Education, Science, Culture and Sports in the House of Peoples of the Federation of BiH. He is currently an advisor to the Federal Minister of Interior.

=== Sport career ===
Branislav Crnogorac was a long-term President of the Judo Federation of Bosnia and Herzegovina and a President of the Sports Federation of Bosnia and Herzegovina. He was a President of the Commission for Sports of the Olympic Committee of Bosnia and Herzegovina from 2007 to 2010 and the Acting Sports Director of the Olympic Committee of BiH from 2008 to 2010. He was the Sports director of the Balkan Judo Federation from 2012 to 2016; He was a member of the Executive Commission of the BiH Olympic Committee from 1996 to 1999.and from 2011 to 2016. Currently, Crnogorac is elected vice-president of the Judo Association of Bosnia and Herzegovina.

He was the first coach of the judo club "Bosna" from 1992 to 2016. He coached the SR BiH national team from 1979 to 1992. He was a member of the coaching team of the Judo Federation of Yugoslavia from 1978 to 1987, and from 1987 to 1991, he was the President of the selection committee of the Judo Federation of Yugoslavia.

He was Bosnia and Herzegovina selector and judo national team trainer from 1992 to 2016, and participated with Bosnia and Herzegovina on five Olympic Games: Barselona 1992; Sydney 2000; Athens 2004; Peking 2008; and London 2012;

With the team he led, he won several SFRY team titles. In the post-Bosnian war period, he is the most successful trainer in Bosnia and Herzegovina in men's competition. He was also the coach of the most successful country's Judoka: Amel Mekić, Davor Vlaškovac, Larisa Cerić, Ibro Miladin, Eldin Omerović, Aleksandra Samardžić, Toni Miletić, Lukač brothers, Arijana Jaha, Jadranka Jahić, Sabina Haračić, Dea Miletić, Amir Topuz. Branislav Crnogorac also worked with sports greats of the former Yugoslav state, such as Fabijan Marijan, Franc Očko, Cuk Stefan, Ivan Todorov, Drago Tavra, Dragan Kusmuk, Jovan Pejčić and many others.

He is named the best coach in Bosnia and Herzegovina in the last two decades by the choice of the Sport Association of Bosnia and Herzegovina (Sportski savez Bosne i Hercegovina) and Sarajevo Canton (concerning all sports).

== Awards and decorations ==
He is a recipient of the highest decoration awarded by the Government of Japan, the Autumn Imperial Decorations for 2020, the Order of the Rising Sun, Golden and Silver Rays, for his contribution to spreading knowledge about judo.

He is a recipient of many state awards, such as State award for sports, Sixth of April Sarajevo Award, 25 May Award (SR BiH), Plaque of the City of Sarajevo (Plaketa grada Sarajeva), Plaque of the University Sports Association Bosna, Gold badge SOFK Grada, Isa Beg Ishaković Award, Plaque of the Jigoro Kano European Judo Union Award.

== See also ==
- Slavko Sikirić
