= Ilualoma Isako =

Congolese judoka

Personal information
- Nationality: Congolese
- Born: 18 June 1969 (age 55)
- Occupation: Judoka

Sport
- Sport: Judo

Ilualoma Isako (born 18 June 1969) is a Congolese judoka. He competed in the men's middleweight event at the 1992 Summer Olympics.
