= Jarosław Brawata =

Polish judoka

Personal information
- Nationality: Polish
- Born: 8 May 1956 (age 68); Gdańsk, Poland

Sport
- Sport: Judo

Jarosław Brawata (born 8 May 1956) is a Polish judoka. He competed in the men's half-middleweight event at the 1980 Summer Olympics.
