= Li Chung Tai =

Hong Kong judoka (born 1951)

Personal information
- Full name
- Traditional Chinese: 李松泰
- Simplified Chinese: 李松泰
Transcriptions
Standard Mandarin
- Hanyu Pinyin: Lǐ Sōngtài
- Wade–Giles: Li³ Sung¹-t'ai⁴
Yue: Cantonese
- Jyutping: Lei5 Cung4 Taai3
- Nationality: Hong Konger
- Born: 27 May 1951 (age 74)

Sport
- Sport: Judo

Li Chung Tai (Chinese: 李松泰; born 27 May 1951) is a Hong Kong judoka and coach. He competed in the men's half-middleweight event at the 1984 Summer Olympics. Li coached Hong Kong judoka at the 1986 Asian Games, the 1990 Asian Games, the 1991 World Judo Championships, the 1993 East Asian Games, the 1994 Asian Games, the 1997 East Asian Games, and the 2001 East Asian Games.

== Biography ==
Li competed at the 1975 World Judo Championships in Vienna. He competed in the 1981 Asian Judo Championships in Jakarta. While a member of the club Hong Kong Judo Kan, Li participated in the 1983 Pacific Rim Judo Championships at Queen Elizabeth Stadium. He was defeated in every match he took part in. He competed in the men's half-middleweight event at the 1984 Summer Olympics. That year, he was a member of the Hongkong Judo Club in 1984 and an employee of the Government of Hong Kong.

Li coached the four Hong Kong team members who competed in judo at the 1986 Asian Games. He was the coach of the six Hong Kong team members who competed in judo at the 1990 Asian Games. Li coached the four Hong team members who competed at the 1991 World Judo Championships. He was the coach of the five team members who competed at the 1993 East Asian Games. Li served as the coach and manager of the four Hong Kong team members who competed in judo at the 1994 Asian Games.

Li served on the executive committee of the Hong Kong Judo Association (HKJA) in 1993 and as a vice president in an opposition group, Hongkong Judo Federation, that sought to take over the HKJA. In 1994, he was elected as the deputy chairman of the HKJA's executive committee. As vice president of the association in 1995, he defended the association's limiting its national championship players to a maximum age of 30, stating, "The average player over 30 is usually, and I stress, usually, not as good as those in their early 20s." Li was the coach of Wu Ching Hui, the sole Hong Kong athlete who competed in judo at the 1996 Summer Olympics. He coached the four Hong Kong athletes who competed in judo at the 1997 East Asian Games. Li was the coach for the Hong Kong judoka who competed in judo at the 2001 East Asian Games.
