= Rodnomyn Erkhembayar =

Mongolian judoka (born 1960)

Personal information
- Nationality: Mongolian
- Born: 17 February 1960 (age 65)

Sport
- Sport: Judo

Rodnomyn Erkhembayar (born 17 February 1960) is a Mongolian judoka. He competed in the men's half-middleweight event at the 1988 Summer Olympics.
