= Wagner Castropil =

Brazilian judoka

Personal information
- Born: 17 June 1966 (age 58); São Paulo, Brazil
- Occupation: Judoka

Sport
- Sport: Judo

Profile at external databases
- JudoInside.com: 6749

Wagner Castropil (born 17 June 1966) is a Brazilian judoka. He competed in the men's middleweight event at the 1992 Summer Olympics.
