= Israel Judo Association =

Judo association

Israel Judo Association איגוד הג'ודו בישראל
- Sport: Judo
- Founded: 1965; 61 years ago
- Affiliation: IJF
- Regional affiliation: EJU
- Headquarters: Tel Aviv, Israel
- President: Moshe Ponte
- Men's coach: Oren Smadja
- Women's coach: Shany Hershko

Official website
- ija.org.il
- (Israel)

The Israel Judo Association (Hebrew: איגוד הג'ודו בישראל) is a sports association in Israel, and its headquarters is located in Tel Aviv, Israel.

The Association operates Israel's national judo teams, holds the Israeli Judo Championships for different age classifications, and offers courses and seminars for instructors, coaches, and referees. It is a member of the European Judo Union.

== History ==
The Israel Judo Association was established in 1965. Amos Greenspan, a second dan, was Chairman of the Association in the early 1970s. At that time, the Association did not easily recognize belts earned overseas, as it sought to maintain very high standards. The Association held Israeli Judo Championships from 1969 for men, and from 1976 for women.

Israel's first two Olympic medals were in judo competing for Israel at the 1992 Summer Olympics in Barcelona (Yael Arad won the silver medal in women's half middleweight, and Oren Smadja won the bronze medal in men's lightweight). The Israel Judo Association's Hall of Fame includes Arad, Smadja, world champion and Olympic bronze medalist Yarden Gerbi, and Olympic bronze medalist Ariel Ze'evi.

Israel Judo Association's president is Moshe Ponte. Ponti said in August 2016, as judo became Israel's unofficial national sport with five of its nine Olympic medals coming in judo: "Soccer may be more popular, but this is what we are good at. Every other kid in Israel does it."

As of November 2016, the International Judo Federation and the Israel Judo Association had begun developing Judo for Peace (JFP) activities in the region, for the benefit of all its communities.

== See also ==
- List of judo organizations
- Judo by country
- Israel national judo team
