= Fridtjof Thoen =

Norwegian judoka

Personal information
- Nationality: Norwegian
- Born: 25 September 1961 (age 63); Oslo, Norway

Sport
- Sport: Judo

Fridtjof Thoen (born 25 September 1961) is a Norwegian judoka. He competed in the men's half-middleweight event at the 1984 Summer Olympics.
