= Dovdongiin Dashjamts =

Mongolian judoka (born 1954)

Personal information
- Nationality: Mongolian
- Born: 11 July 1954 (age 70)

Sport
- Sport: Judo

Dovdongiin Dashjamts (born 11 July 1954) is a Mongolian judoka. He competed in the men's half-middleweight event at the 1980 Summer Olympics.
