= Philippe Simo =

Cameroonian judoka

Personal information
- Nationality: Cameroonian

Sport
- Sport: Judo

Philippe Simo is a Cameroonian judoka. He competed in the men's half-middleweight event at the 1980 Summer Olympics.
