= David McManus =

Irish judoka

Personal information
- Nationality: Irish
- Born: 30 July 1955 (age 69)

Sport
- Sport: Judo

David McManus (born 30 July 1955) is an Irish judoka. He competed in the men's half-middleweight event at the 1980 Summer Olympics.
