= Axel Lobenstein =

German judoka

Personal information
- Nationality: German
- Born: 19 May 1965 (age 59); Apolda, East Germany
- Occupation: Judoka

Sport
- Sport: Judo

Profile at external databases
- JudoInside.com: 2183

Axel Lobenstein (born 19 May 1965) is a German former judoka. He competed in the men's middleweight event at the 1992 Summer Olympics.
