= Altagracia Contreras =

Dominican Republic judoka (born 1974)

Personal information
- Nationality: Dominican
- Born: 18 February 1974 (age 52)

Sport
- Sport: Judo
Medal record
Representing Dominican Republic
Pan American Games
Silver medal – second place	1991 Havana	Lightweight
Central American and Caribbean Games
Bronze medal – third place	1990 Mexico City	Lightweight

Altagracia Miosotis Contreras Martinez (born 18 February 1974) is a Dominican Republic judoka. She competed in the women's lightweight event at the 1992 Summer Olympics. Contreras was the flag bearer for the Dominican Republic in the 1992 opening ceremony.

Olympic Games
Preceded by Juan Núñez	Flagbearer for Dominican Republic; Barcelona 1992	Succeeded by Joan Guzmán
