= Aporosa Boginisoko =

Fijian judoka

Personal information
- Nationality: Fijian
- Born: 1 January 1969 (age 56)

Sport
- Sport: Judo

Aporosa Boginisoko (born 1 January 1969) is a Fijian judoka. He competed in the men's middleweight event at the 1992 Summer Olympics.
