= Hwang Jin-su =

South Korean judoka

Personal information
- Nationality: South Korean
- Born: 16 September 1957 (age 67)

Sport
- Sport: Judo

Hwang Jin-su (born 16 September 1957) is a South Korean judoka. He competed in the men's half-middleweight event at the 1984 Summer Olympics.
