= Luis Val =

Australian judoka

Personal information
- Born: 17 October 1959 (age 66)
- Occupation: Judoka

Sport
- Country: Australia
- Sport: Judo
- Weight class: –71 kg, –78 kg
- Rank: 8th dan black belt

Achievements and titles
- Olympic Games: R32 (1988)
- World Champ.: 5th (1987)
- Oceania Champ.: (gold) (1979)
Medal record
Men's judo
Representing Australia
Oceania Championships
Gold medal – first place	1979 Rotorua	–71 kg
Silver medal – second place	1983 Nouméa	–78 kg
Oceania Junior Championships
Gold medal – first place	1977 Melbourne	–71 kg

Profile at external databases
- IJF: 11527
- JudoInside.com: 4676
- Updated on 10 March 2023

Luis Val (born 17 October 1959) is an Australian judoka. He competed in the men's half-middleweight event at the 1988 Summer Olympics.
