= Hermate Souffrant =

Haitian judoka (born 1968)

Personal information
- Nationality: Haitian
- Born: 1 July 1968 (age 57)

Sport
- Sport: Judo
Medal record
Representing Haiti
Pan American Games
Bronze medal – third place	1991 Havana	Middleweight
Central American and Caribbean Games
Bronze medal – third place	1993 Ponce	Middleweight

Hermate Souffrant (born 1 July 1968) is a Haitian judoka. He competed in the men's middleweight event at the 1992 Summer Olympics. Souffrant won a bronze medal in the middleweight category at the 1991 Pan American Games
