= Henry Sichalwe =

Zambian judoka

Personal information
- Nationality: Zambian

Sport
- Sport: Judo

Henry Sichalwe is a Zambian judoka. He competed in the men's half-middleweight event at the 1980 Summer Olympics.
