= Victorino González =

Spanish judoka

Vítorino González
Personal information
- Nationality: Spanish
- Born: 24 June 1964 (age 60)

Sport
- Sport: Judo

Juan Victorino González Enríquez (born 24 June 1964) is a Spanish judoka. He competed in the men's half-middleweight event at the 1988 Summer Olympics.
