= Wang Nan (judoka) =

Chinese judoka

Personal information
- Nationality: Chinese
- Born: 15 December 1970 (age 54)

Sport
- Sport: Judo

Wang Nan (born 15 December 1970) is a Chinese judoka. He competed in the men's middleweight event at the 1992 Summer Olympics.
