= Tsay Yow-tayn =

Taiwanese judoka

Personal information
- Full name: 蔡 侑潭, Pinyin: Cài Yòu-tán
- Nationality: Taiwanese
- Born: 14 October 1968 (age 56)

Sport
- Sport: Judo

Tsay Yow-tayn (born 14 October 1968) is a Taiwanese judoka. He competed in the men's half-middleweight event at the 1988 Summer Olympics.
