= Jukka-Pekka Metsola =

Finnish judoka (born 1964)

Personal information
- Nationality: Finnish
- Born: 13 May 1964 (age 60); Tampere, Finland
- Occupation: Judoka

Sport
- Sport: Judo

Profile at external databases
- JudoInside.com: 10705

Jukka-Pekka Metsola (born 13 May 1964) is a Finnish judoka. He competed in the men's half-middleweight event at the 1988 Summer Olympics.
