= Ousseynou Guèye =

Senegalese judoka

Personal information
- Nationality: Senegalese
- Born: 9 October 1958 (age 66)

Sport
- Sport: Judo

El Hadji Ousseynou Guèye (born 9 October 1958) is a Senegalese judoka. He competed in the men's half-middleweight event at the 1984 Summer Olympics.
