= Rajinder Kumar Dhanger =

Indian judoka

Personal information
- Nationality: Indian
- Born: 4 October 1961 (age 63)

Sport
- Sport: Judo

Rajinder Kumar Dhanger (born 4 October 1961) is an Indian judoka. He competed in the men's middleweight event at the 1992 Summer Olympics.
