= Vladimír Bárta =

Czech judoka

Personal information
- Nationality: Czech
- Born: 13 January 1955 (age 70); Nový Jičín, Czechoslovakia
- Occupation: Judoka

Sport
- Sport: Judo

Profile at external databases
- JudoInside.com: 13360

Vladimír Bárta (born 13 January 1955) is a Czech judoka. He competed in the men's half-middleweight event at the 1980 Summer Olympics.
