= Rob Henneveld =

Dutch judoka

Personal information
- Nationality: Dutch
- Born: 15 September 1963 (age 61); Maassluis, Netherlands

Sport
- Sport: Judo

Rob Henneveld (born 15 September 1963) is a Dutch judoka. He competed in the men's half-middleweight event at the 1984 Summer Olympics.
