= Károly Németh (judoka) =

Hungarian judoka

Personal information
- Nationality: Hungarian
- Born: 10 November 1957 (age 67); Budakeszi, Hungary

Sport
- Sport: Judo

Károly Németh (born 10 November 1957) is a Hungarian judoka. He competed in the men's half-middleweight event at the 1988 Summer Olympics.
