= Gaston Oula =

Ivorian judoka

Personal information
- Nationality: Ivorian
- Born: 1950 or 1951
- Died: 29 June 2025 (aged 74)

Sport
- Sport: Judo

Gaston Oula (1950 or 1951 – 29 June 2025) was an Ivorian judoka. He competed in the men's half-middleweight event at the 1984 Summer Olympics.
