= Yang Jong-ok =

South Korean judoka

Personal information
- Nationality: South Korean
- Born: 9 March 1964 (age 61)

Sport
- Sport: Judo

Yang Jong-ok (born 9 March 1964) is a South Korean judoka. He competed in the men's middleweight event at the 1992 Summer Olympics.
