= Kilmar Campos =

Venezuelan judoka (born 1963)

Personal information
- Born: 22 June 1963 (age 63)
- Occupation: Judoka

Sport
- Country: Venezuela
- Sport: Judo
- Weight class: –78 kg
- Rank: 7th dan black belt

Achievements and titles
- Olympic Games: R32 (1988)
- World Champ.: 9th (1993)
- Pan American Champ.: (1992)
Medal record
Men's judo
Representing Venezuela
Pan American Games
Bronze medal – third place	1987 Indianapolis	–78 kg
Pan American Championships
Bronze medal – third place	1992 Ontario	–78 kg

Profile at external databases
- IJF: 13751
- JudoInside.com: 9589
- Updated on 12 March 2023

Kilmar Campos (born 22 June 1963) is a Venezuelan judoka. He competed in the men's half-middleweight event at the 1988 Summer Olympics.
