= Yahia Mufarrih =

Yemeni judoka

Personal information
- Born: 18 September 1968 (age 56)

Sport
- Country: Yemen
- Sport: Judo

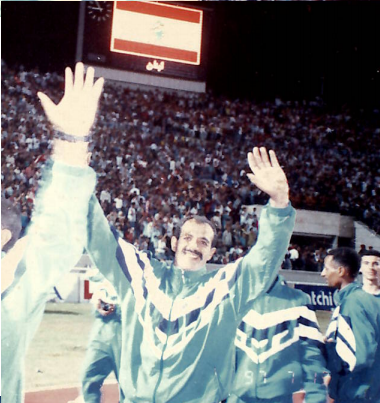
Judo player Yahya Saleh Saleh Mofreh in Lebanon

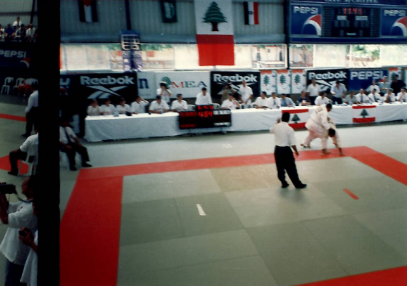
Yahya Saleh Saleh Mofreh Judo player in Lebanon

Yahia Mufarrih (born September 18, 1968) is a Yemeni judoka. He competed internationally for Yemen at the 1992 Summer Olympics.

== Career ==
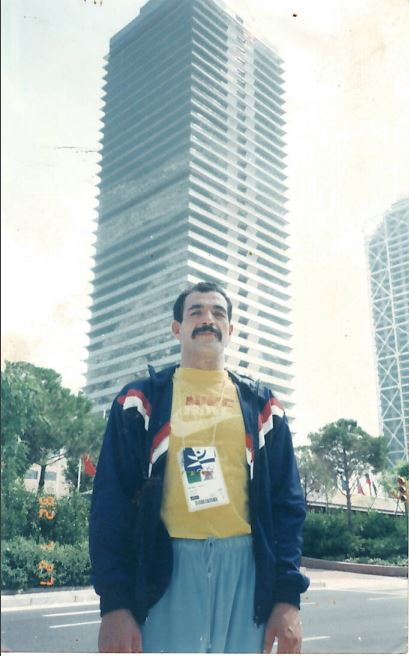
Spain Barcelona Olymbic 1992 Judo player Yahya Saleh Saleh Mofreh

Mufarrih competed in the middleweight division at the 1992 Summer Olympics in Barcelona, Spain. In the first round he was drawn against Nikola Filipov from Bulgaria, but he did not advance any further in the competition, as he lost the bout.
