= Sun Yih-shong =

Taiwanese judoka

Personal information
- Full name: 孫 義雄, Pinyin: Sūn Yì-xióng
- Nationality: Taiwanese
- Born: 15 September 1958 (age 66)

Sport
- Sport: Judo

Sun Yih-shong (born 15 September 1958) is a Taiwanese judoka. He competed in the men's half-middleweight event at the 1984 Summer Olympics.
