= Mohamed Maach =

Moroccan judoka

Personal information
- Nationality: Moroccan
- Born: 20 February 1958 (age 67)

Sport
- Sport: Judo

Mohamed Maach (born 20 February 1958) is a Moroccan judoka. He competed in the men's half-middleweight event at the 1984 Summer Olympics.
