= Michael Oduor =

Kenyan judoka

Personal information
- Nationality: Kenyan
- Born: 6 September 1962
- Died: July 1996 (aged 33)
- Occupation: Judoka

Sport
- Sport: Judo

Michael Oduor (6 September 1962 – July 1996) was a Kenyan judoka. He competed in the men's middleweight event at the 1992 Summer Olympics.
