= Carlos Alberto Cunha =

Brazilian judoka (1959–2016)

Personal information
- Nationality: Brazilian
- Born: 21 May 1959
- Died: 10 November 2016 (aged 57)

Sport
- Sport: Judo

Carlos Alberto Cunha (21 May 1959 – 10 November 2016) was a Brazilian judoka. He competed in the men's half-middleweight event at the 1980 Summer Olympics.
