= Ioannis Kougialis =

Cypriot judoka (born 1957)

Personal information
- Nationality: Cypriot
- Born: 19 September 1957 (age 67)
- Occupation: Judoka

Sport
- Sport: Judo

Ioannis Kougialis (born 19 September 1957) is a Cypriot judoka. He competed in the men's half-middleweight event at the 1984 Summer Olympics.
