= Károly Korbel =

Hungarian judoka

Personal information
- Nationality: Hungarian
- Born: 5 August 1971 (age 53); Budapest, Hungary
- Occupation: Judoka

Sport
- Sport: Judo

Profile at external databases
- IJF: 53575
- JudoInside.com: 5278

Károly Korbel (born 5 August 1971) is a Hungarian judoka. He competed in the men's middleweight event at the 1992 Summer Olympics.
