= Mariano Aquino =

Guamanian judoka

Personal information
- Nationality: Guam
- Born: 6 July 1969 (age 56)

Sport
- Sport: Judo

Mariano Aquino (born 6 July 1969) is a judoka from Guam. He competed in the men's half-middleweight event at the 1988 Summer Olympics.
