= Juan Ferrer =

Cuban Olympic judoka (1955–2015)

Personal information
- Full name: Juan Ferrer Lahera
- Born: 24 August 1955
- Died: 22 October 2015 (aged 60)
- Occupation: Judoka

Sport
- Country: Cuba
- Sport: Judo
- Weight class: ‍–‍78 kg

Achievements and titles
- Olympic Games: (silver) (1980)
- World Champ.: R32 (1983)
- Pan American Champ.: (1984)
Medal record
Men's judo
Representing Cuba
Olympic Games
Silver medal – second place	1980 Moscow	‍–‍78 kg
Pan American Games
Silver medal – second place	1983 Caracas	‍–‍78 kg
Bronze medal – third place	1979 San Juan	‍–‍78 kg
Pan American Championships
Gold medal – first place	1984 Mexico CIty	‍–‍78 kg
Silver medal – second place	1974 Panama City	‍–‍70 kg

Profile at external databases
- IJF: 54249
- JudoInside.com: 966
- Updated on 20 June 2023

Juan Ferrer Lahera (24 August 1955 – 22 October 2015) was a Cuban judoka who competed in the 1980 Summer Olympics. He helped to train some of the great Cuban judokas such as Ernesto R Cortes, a silver and gold medallist in the Central and Panamerican games.
