= Pascal Tayot =

French judoka (born 1965)

Personal information
- Born: 15 March 1965 (age 61)
- Occupation: Judoka

Sport
- Country: France
- Sport: Judo
- Weight class: –‍78 kg, –‍86 kg

Achievements and titles
- Olympic Games: (silver) (1992)
- World Champ.: 5th (1991)
- European Champ.: (gold) (1992, 1993)
Medal record
Men's judo
Representing France
Olympic Games
Silver medal – second place	1992 Barcelona	‍–‍86 kg
European Championships
Gold medal – first place	1992 Paris	‍–‍86 kg
Gold medal – first place	1993 Athens	‍–‍86 kg
Bronze medal – third place	1988 Pamplona	‍–‍78 kg
European Junior Championships
Gold medal – first place	1985 Delemont	‍–‍78 kg
Silver medal – second place	1984 Cadiz	‍–‍78 kg
Mediterranean Games
Gold medal – first place	1993 Perpignan	‍–‍86 kg

Profile at external databases
- IJF: 13830
- JudoInside.com: 2612
- Updated on 5 June 2023

Pascal Tayot (born 15 March 1965 in Gennevilliers, Hauts-de-Seine) is a retired judoka from France. He claimed the silver medal in the Men's Middleweight (‍–‍86 kg) division at the 1992 Summer Olympics in Barcelona, Spain. In the final he was defeated by Poland's Waldemar Legień.
