= Isaac Angbo =

Ivorian judoka

Personal information
- Nationality: Ivorian
- Born: 22 February 1966 (age 59)

Sport
- Sport: Judo

Isaac Angbo (born 22 February 1966) is an Ivorian judoka. He competed in the men's middleweight event at the 1992 Summer Olympics.
