= Harald Heinke =

East German judoka (born 1955)

Personal information
- Born: 15 May 1955 (age 71)
- Occupation: Judoka

Sport
- Country: East Germany
- Sport: Judo
- Weight class: ‍–‍78 kg

Achievements and titles
- Olympic Games: (bronze) (1980)
- World Champ.: (bronze) (1979)
- European Champ.: (gold) (1978, 1979)
Medal record
Men's judo
Representing East Germany
Olympic Games
Bronze medal – third place	1980 Moscow	‍–‍78 kg
World Championships
Bronze medal – third place	1979 Paris	‍–‍78 kg
European Championships
Gold medal – first place	1978 Helsinki	‍–‍78 kg
Gold medal – first place	1979 Brussels	‍–‍78 kg
Silver medal – second place	1977 Ludwigshafen	‍–‍78 kg
Silver medal – second place	1980 Vienna	‍–‍78 kg
European Junior Championships
Gold medal – first place	1975 Turku	‍–‍80 kg
European Cadet Championships
Gold medal – first place	1972 Leningrad	‍–‍75 kg

Profile at external databases
- IJF: 54253
- JudoInside.com: 5590
- Updated on 20 June 2023

Harald Heinke (born 15 May 1955 in Eilenburg) is an East German former judoka who competed in the 1980 Summer Olympics.
