= Hiromitsu Takano =

Japanese judoka

Personal information
- Nationality: Japanese
- Born: 25 August 1959 (age 66)

Sport
- Sport: Judo

Hiromitsu Takano (Japanese: 高野裕光, born 25 August 1959) is a Japanese judoka. He competed in the men's half-middleweight event at the 1984 Summer Olympics.
