= Andrés Franco (judoka) =

Cuban judoka (born 1966)

Personal information
- Full name: Andrés Franco Ramos
- Nationality: Cuban
- Born: 10 November 1966 (age 59)

Sport
- Sport: Judo
Medal record
Representing Cuba
Pan American Games
Bronze medal – third place	1987 Indianapolis	Half-middleweight
Bronze medal – third place	1991 Havana	Middleweight
Central American and Caribbean Games
Gold medal – first place	1986 Santiago	Middleweight
Gold medal – first place	1990 Mexico City	Middleweight

Andrés Franco Ramos (Note: In this Spanish name, the first or paternal surname is Franco and the second or maternal family name is Ramos.) (born 10 November 1966) is a Cuban judoka. He competed in the men's middleweight event at the 1992 Summer Olympics.
