= Lam Lap Hing =

Hong Kong judoka

Personal information
- Nationality: Hong Konger
- Born: 4 February 1958 (age 67)

Sport
- Sport: Judo

Lam Lap Hing (born 4 February 1958) is a Hong Kong judoka. He competed in the men's half-middleweight event at the 1988 Summer Olympics.
