= Per Kjellin =

Swedish judoka

Personal information
- Nationality: Swedish
- Born: 9 May 1960 (age 64); Borås, Sweden

Sport
- Sport: Judo

Per Kjellin (born 9 May 1960) is a Swedish judoka. He competed in the men's half-middleweight event at the 1984 Summer Olympics.
