= Thomas Haasmann =

Austrian judoka

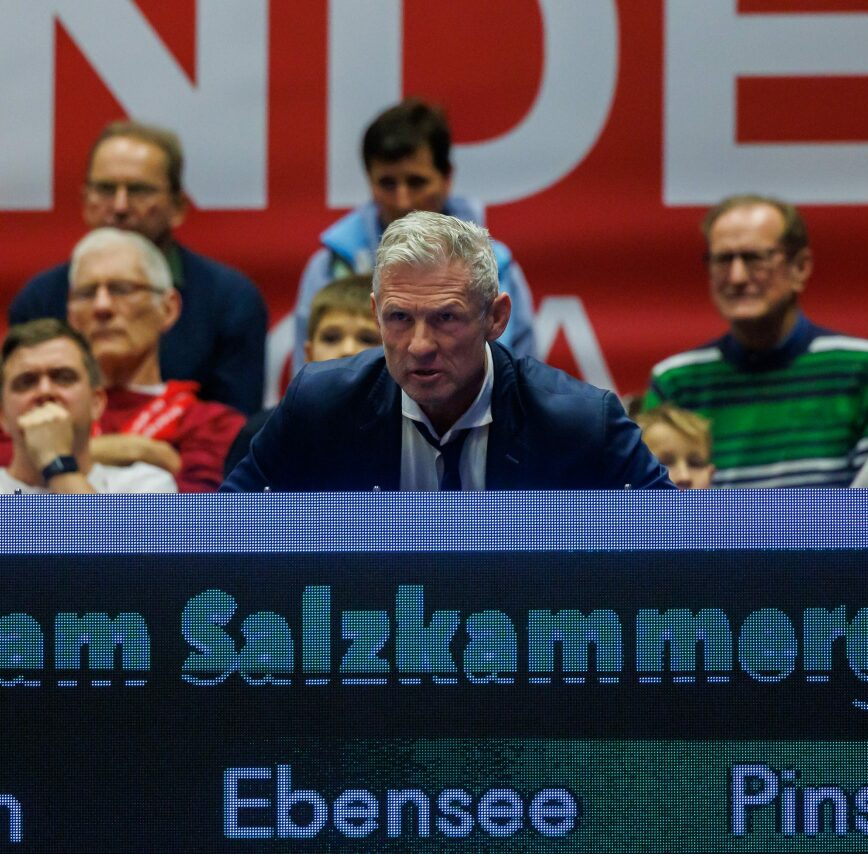

Personal information
- Full name: Thomas Haasmann
- Nickname: Tommy
- Nationality: Austrian
- Born: 2 August 1961 (age 63); Austria
- Occupation: Judoka

Sport
- Country: Austria
- Sport: Judo
- Weight class: –78 kg
- Rank: 7th dan black belt
- Club: Galaxy Judo Tiger

Profile at external databases
- JudoInside.com: 5657

Thomas Haasmann (born 2 August 1961) is an Austrian judoka. He competed in the men's half-middleweight event at the 1984 Summer Olympics.
