= Daniel Kistler =

Swiss judoka

Personal information
- Nationality: Swiss
- Born: 17 June 1962 (age 62)

Sport
- Sport: Judo

Daniel Kistler (born 17 June 1962) is a Swiss judoka. He competed in the men's middleweight event at the 1992 Summer Olympics.
