= Hisham Al-Sharaf =

Kuwaiti judoka (born 1960)

Personal information
- Nationality: Kuwaiti
- Born: 2 April 1960 (age 65)
- Occupation: Judoka

Sport
- Sport: Judo

Hisham Al-Sharaf (born 2 April 1960) is a Kuwaiti judoka. He competed in the men's half-middleweight event at the 1988 Summer Olympics.
