= Javier Cóndor =

Costa Rican judoka

Javier Condor
Personal information
- Full name: Javier Cóndor Long Saborío
- Nationality: Costa Rican
- Born: 24 October 1960 (age 65)

Sport
- Sport: Judo

Javier Cóndor Long Saborío (born 24 October 1960) is a Costa Rican judoka. He competed in the men's half-middleweight event at the 1984 Summer Olympics.
