= Slavko Sikirić =

Yugoslav judoka (born 1955)

Personal information
- Nationality: Yugoslav
- Born: 29 June 1955 (age 69)

Sport
- Sport: Judo

Slavko Sikirić (born 29 June 1955) is a Yugoslav judoka. He competed in the men's half-middleweight event at the 1980 Summer Olympics.
