= Hirotaka Okada =

Japanese judoka (born 1967)

Personal information
- Born: 22 February 1967 (age 59)
- Occupation: Judoka

Sport
- Country: Japan
- Sport: Judo
- Weight class: ‍–‍78 kg, ‍–‍86 kg

Achievements and titles
- Olympic Games: (bronze) (1992)
- World Champ.: (1987, 1991)
- Asian Champ.: (gold) (1990, 1993)
Medal record
Men's judo
Representing Japan
Olympic Games
Bronze medal – third place	1992 Barcelona	‍–‍86 kg
World Championships
Gold medal – first place	1987 Essen	‍–‍78 kg
Gold medal – first place	1991 Barcelona	‍–‍86 kg
Asian Games
Gold medal – first place	1990 Beijing	‍–‍86 kg
Asian Championships
Gold medal – first place	1993 Macau	‍–‍86 kg
World Juniors Championships
Bronze medal – third place	1986 Rome	‍–‍78 kg

Profile at external databases
- IJF: 5181
- JudoInside.com: 2936
- Updated on 5 June 2023

Hirotaka Okada (岡田 弘隆, Okada Hirotaka; born 22 February 1967 in Ōno, Gifu, Japan) is a retired judoka who competed in the ‍–‍78 kg and ‍–‍86 kg divisions.

== Biography ==
Okada began judo in primary school, and won the inter-highschool light heavyweight judo tournament in 1984. While attending the University of Tsukuba, he won the Jigoro Kano Cup in 1986 and the All-Japan Judo Championships in 1987 and 1988, followed with a gold medal in the ‍–‍78 kg division of the World Judo Championships in 1987. This earned him a spot on the Japanese olympic judo team for the 1988 Summer Olympics, but he was unable to win a medal after a loss in the third round of the tournament.

Okada joined the Marunaka corporation in 1990, and continued his graduate studies at the University of Tsukuba until 1993. In 1990, he moved up in weight to win the ‍–‍86 kg divisions of the Kodokan Cup and Asian Games. He also won the All-Japan Championships for three consecutive years from 1990 to 1992, and won another gold medal at the 1991 World Championships. He made his second trip to the Summer Olympics in 1992, and finished with a bronze medal.

Okada won the Kodokan Cup again in 1992 before facing Yoshio Nakamura in the 1994 All-Japan Championships. Nakamura caught Okada in a complete Ude-Hishigi-Juji-Gatame midway through the match, but Okada refused to tap out, forcing the referee to call time. As a result, Okada seriously injured his left arm, suffering a torn ligament and a dislocation. The match ended in a yusei loss for Okada.

Okada won another international competition in Germany before announcing his retirement in December 1995. He has worked as a judo instructor for the University of Tsukuba after retiring, and has appeared as a color commentator for NHK's judo broadcasts.

== See also ==
- List of judoka
- List of Olympic medalists in judo
