= Peter Reiter (judoka) =

Austrian judoka (born 1960)

Personal information
- Born: 30 June 1960 (age 66) Linz, Austria
- Occupation: Judoka

Sport
- Country: Austria
- Sport: Judo
- Weight class: ‍–‍78 kg

Achievements and titles
- Olympic Games: 11th (1988)
- World Champ.: QF (1985)
- European Champ.: (bronze) (1987, 1988)
Medal record
Men's judo
Representing Austria
European Championships
Bronze medal – third place	1987 Paris	‍–‍78 kg
Bronze medal – third place	1988 Pamplona	‍–‍78 kg

Profile at external databases
- IJF: 53701
- JudoInside.com: 3219
- Updated on 9 July 2024

Peter Reiter (born 30 June 1960) is an Austrian judoka. He competed in the men's half-middleweight event at the 1988 Summer Olympics.
