= Rogério dos Santos (judoka) =

Brazilian judoka

Personal information
- Born: 31 May 1962 (age 63); Sabará, Minas Gerais, Brazil

Sport
- Sport: Judo

Rogério dos Santos (born 31 May 1962) is a Brazilian judoka. He competed in the men's half-middleweight event at the 1984 Summer Olympics.
