= Michel Nowak =

French judoka (born 1962)

Personal information
- Born: 30 June 1962 (age 64)
- Occupation: Judoka

Sport
- Country: France
- Sport: Judo
- Weight class: ‍–‍78 kg

Achievements and titles
- Olympic Games: (bronze) (1984)
- World Champ.: R16 (1985)
- European Champ.: (bronze) (1984, 1985)
Medal record
Men's judo
Representing France
Olympic Games
Bronze medal – third place	1984 Los Angeles	‍–‍78 kg
European Championships
Bronze medal – third place	1984 Liege	‍–‍78 kg
Bronze medal – third place	1985 Hamar	‍–‍78 kg
European Junior Championships
Gold medal – first place	1980 Lisbon	‍–‍78 kg
Gold medal – first place	1981 San Marino	‍–‍78 kg
Bronze medal – third place	1979 Edinburgh	‍–‍78 kg
European Cadet Championships
Bronze medal – third place	1978 Miskolc Hungary	‍–‍75 kg

Profile at external databases
- IJF: 54148
- JudoInside.com: 5195
- Updated on 19 June 2023

Michel Nowak (born 30 June 1962) is a French judoka and Olympic medalist. He won a bronze medal at the 1984 Summer Olympics in Los Angeles.
