= Seppo Myllylä =

Finnish judoka

Personal information
- Nationality: Finnish
- Born: 9 August 1958 (age 68) Orivesi, Finland

Sport
- Sport: Judo

Seppo Myllylä (born 9 August 1958) is a Finnish judoka. He competed at the 1980 Summer Olympics and the 1984 Summer Olympics.
