= Bernard Tchoullouyan =

French Olympic judoka (1953–2019)

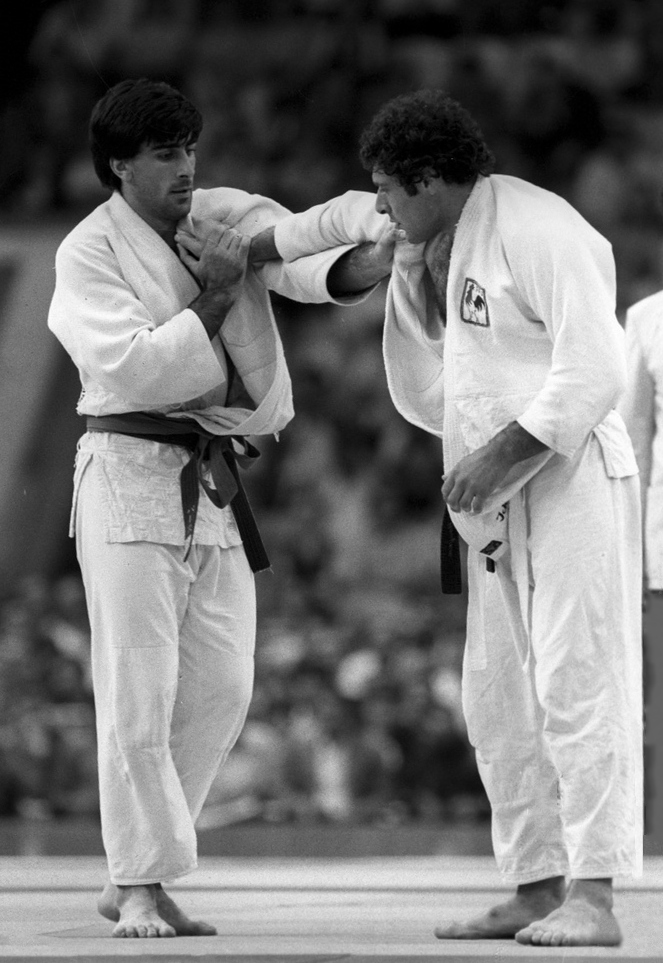
- Tchoullouyan (right) at the 1980 Olympics

Personal information
- Born: 12 April 1953 Marseille, France
- Died: 7 January 2019 (aged 65)
- Occupation: Judoka
- Height: 178 cm (5 ft 10 in)

Sport
- Country: France
- Sport: Judo
- Weight class: ‍–‍78 kg
- Club: ASPTT Marseille

Achievements and titles
- Olympic Games: (bronze) (1980)
- World Champ.: (1981)
- European Champ.: (silver) (1981)
Medal record
Men's judo
Representing France
Olympic Games
Bronze medal – third place	1980 Moscow	‍–‍78 kg
World Championships
Gold medal – first place	1981 Maastricht	‍–‍86 kg
Silver medal – second place	1979 Paris	‍–‍78 kg
European Championships
Silver medal – second place	1981 Debrecen	‍–‍86 kg
Bronze medal – third place	1977 Ludwigshafen	‍–‍78 kg
Bronze medal – third place	1978 Helsinki	‍–‍78 kg
Bronze medal – third place	1980 Vienna	‍–‍78 kg
Bronze medal – third place	1982 Rostock	‍–‍86 kg

Profile at external databases
- IJF: 54245
- JudoInside.com: 5240
- Updated on 20 June 2023

Bernard Tchoullouyan (12 April 1953 — 7 January 2019) was a French judoka. He won a world title in 1981 and an Olympic bronze medal in 1980. Tchoullouyan died on 7 January 2019, at the age of 65.
