= Frank Wieneke =

German judoka

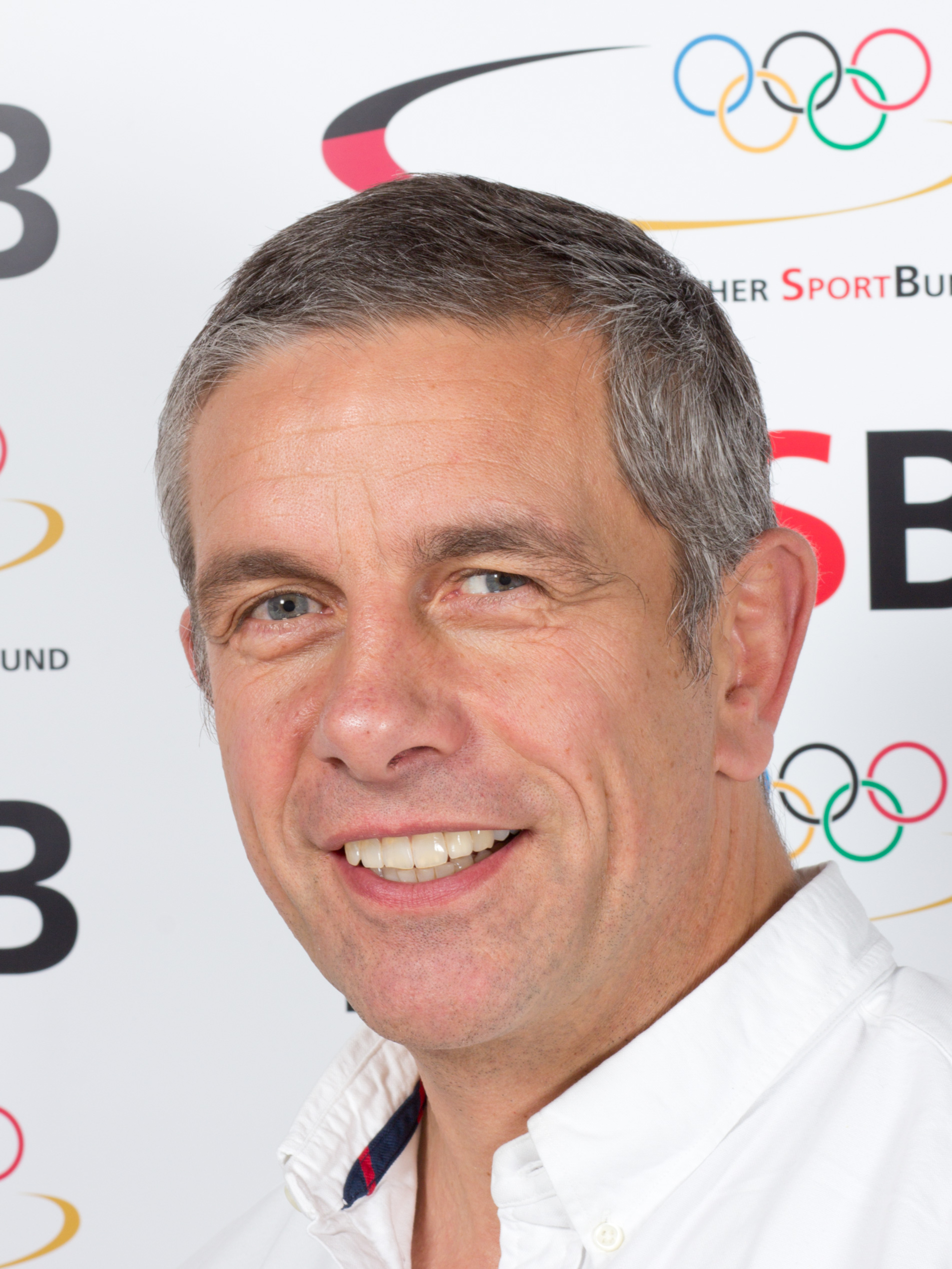
- Wieneke in 2011

Personal information
- Born: 31 January 1962 (age 64) Hannover, West Germany
- Occupation: Judoka

Sport
- Country: West Germany
- Sport: Judo
- Weight class: ‍–‍78 kg
- Rank: 8th dan black belt
- Club: VfL Wolfsburg

Achievements and titles
- Olympic Games: (gold) (1984)
- World Champ.: 5th (1989)
- European Champ.: (gold) (1986)
Medal record
Men's judo
Representing West Germany
Olympic Games
Gold medal – first place	1984 Los Angeles	‍–‍78 kg
Silver medal – second place	1988 Seoul	‍–‍78 kg
European Championships
Gold medal – first place	1986 Belgrade	‍–‍78 kg
Silver medal – second place	1988 Pamplona	‍–‍78 kg
Silver medal – second place	1989 Helsinki	‍–‍78 kg
European Junior Championships
Silver medal – second place	1981 San Marino	‍–‍71 kg
Bronze medal – third place	1980 Lisbon	‍–‍71 kg

Profile at external databases
- IJF: 53807
- JudoInside.com: 4885
- Updated on 6 June 2023

Frank Wieneke (born 31 January 1962 in Hannover) is a German judoka and olympic champion. He won a gold medal in the half middleweight division at the 1984 Summer Olympics in Los Angeles. He is a member of Germany's Sports Hall of Fame.

== Career ==
Among other accomplishments, Wieneke became an Olympic gold medalist in the 1984 Olympic Games in Los Angeles, and a silver medalist in the 1988 Olympic Games in Seoul, both in the half-middleweight class. In addition, he was seven-time champion at the international or German national levels, and was once European champion (1986) and twice runner-up in European championships. Wieneke was a starter for VfL Wolfsburg, and during his career as a competing judoka, from 1979 to 1992, he was a member of the German National Team.

Since 2001, Frank Wieneke coached the German Olympic first team. He coached Ole Bischof to a gold medal in the 2008 Olympic Games in Beijing. On 25 February 2018, at the occasion of the 2018 Düsseldorf Grand Slam Tournament, the German Judo Federation publicly announced it had promoted Wieneke, at that point 56 years of age, to judo 8th dan black belt.

On 31 December 2008 Frank Wieneke ended his eight-year stint as full-time coach to the German U23 National Team for the German Judo Federation. From January 2009, he is scientific lecturer at the Coaching Academy in Cologne, responsible for the training and continuing training in the degreed trainer study track. Wieneke's successor coach of the German National Team is Detlef Ultsch. In 2016, Mr. Wieneke was inducted into Germany's Sports Hall of Fame. He lives together with his wife Marita and two children in the vicinity of Cologne.

== Individual achievements as a competing judoka ==
- 1980 3rd place in the European U21 Championships in Lisbon, -71 kg
- 1981 2nd place in European U21 Championships in San Marino, -71 kg
- 1983 Second place in the German Championships in Würzburg, -78 kg
- 1984 Olympic gold medalist in the Summer Olympics in Los Angeles, in the -78 kg
- 1985 German Champion in Frankenthal, in the -78 kg
- 1986 1st place in the European Championships in Belgrade, in the -78 kg
- 1986 Champion in the Tournoi de Paris, in the -78 kg
- 1986 International German Champion in Russelsheim, in the -78 kg
- 1986 German Champion in Munich, in the -78 kg
- 1987 German Champion in Hannover, in the -78 kg
- 1988 German Champion in Duisburg, in the -78 kg
- 1988 Silver medalist in the Summer Olympics in Seoul, in the -78 kg
- 1988 2nd place in the European Championships in Pamplona, in the -78 kg
- 1989 2nd place in the European Championships in Helsinki, in the -78 kg
- 1989 5th place in the World Championships in Belgrade, in the -78 kg
- 1990 German Champion in Heilbronn, in the -78 kg

== Achievements in team competition ==
- 1981 1st place European Cup Champions with VfL Wolfsburg
- 1986 IJF International Team Cup Paris: Champion with the European Continental Team
- 1987 2nd place Men's European Cup, Finals: US Orleans vs. VfL Wolfsburg
- 1988 2nd place Men's European Cup, Finals: Racing Club de France vs. VfL Wolfsburg

== Achievements as coach of the German national team ==
- 2001 Bronze medal in the World Championships in Munich
- 2003 2 Bronze medals in the European Championships in Düsseldorf
- 2003 Gold medal in the World Championships in Osaka
- 2004 Silver medal in the European Championships in Bucharest
- 2004 Bronze medal in the Summer Olympics in Athens
- 2005 Gold medal in the European Championships in Rotterdam
- 2006 Gold and bronze medals in the European Championships in Tampere
- 2007 Bronze medal in European Championships in Bucharest
- 2008 Bronze medal in the European Championships in Lisbon
- 2008 Gold medal in the Summer Olympics in Beijing
- 2008 Judo Coach of the Year
