= Patrick Matangi =

Zimbabwean judoka (born 1967)

Personal information
- Nationality: Zimbabwean
- Born: 13 January 1967 (age 58)

Sport
- Sport: Judo

Patrick Matangi (born 13 January 1967) is a Zimbabwean judoka. He competed at the 1988 Summer Olympics and the 1992 Summer Olympics.
