= Rogéria Gomes =

Brazilian radio and theatrical producer (born 1962)

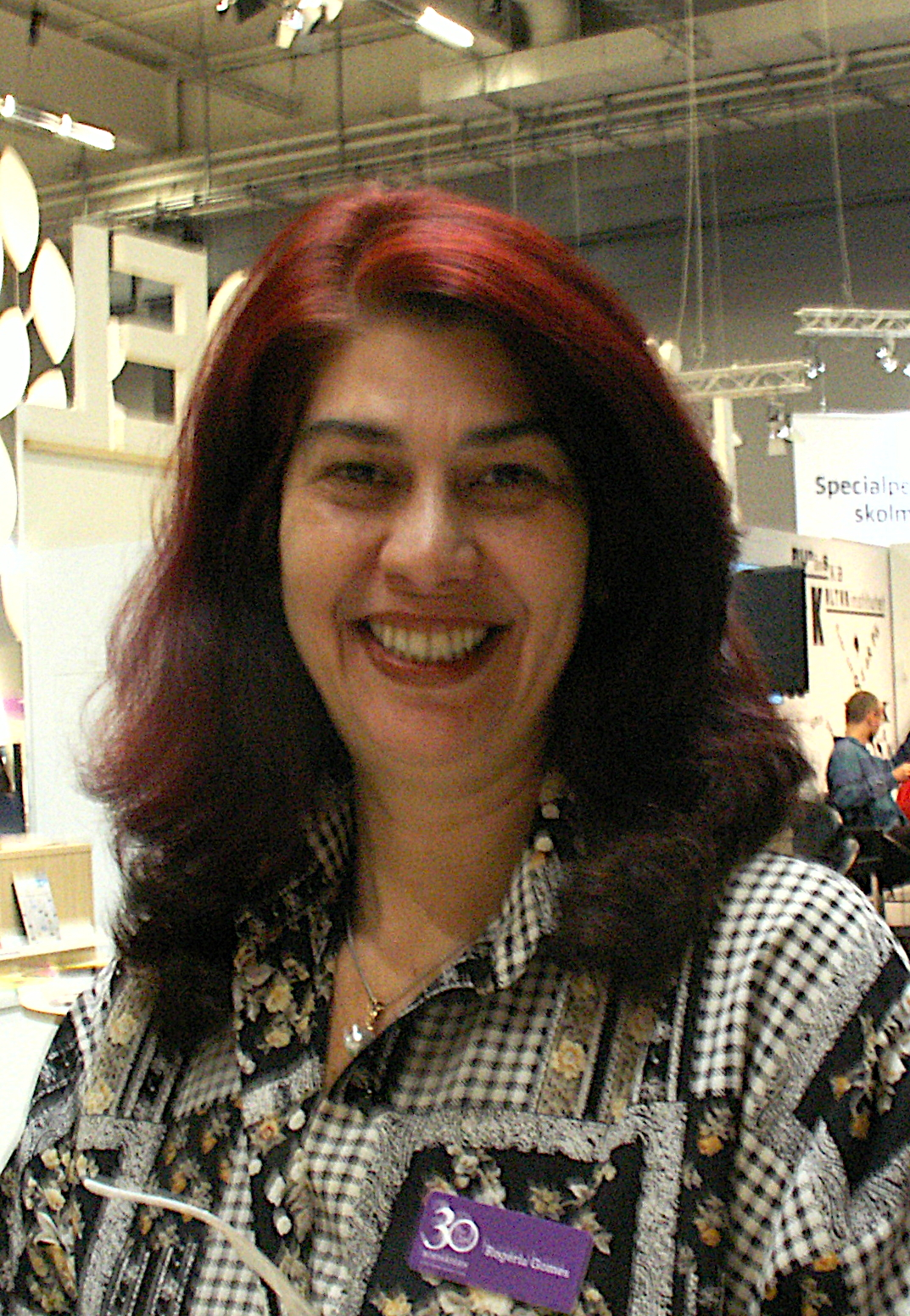
- Rogéria Gomes at the Gothenburg Book Fair, 2014
- Born: 1962 (age 63–64); Rio de Janeiro, Brazil
- Occupations: Radio journalist, writer, radio producer
- Notable work: As grandes damas
- Awards: "Troféu Carlos Drummond de Andrade" (2014)

Rogéria Gomes (born in 1962) is a Brazilian radio and theatrical producer. She is a cultural journalist and works for both radio and magazines. In 2011 she released As grandes damas, a book on the history of Brazilian theatre.

== Background and journalist ==
Gomes was born in Rio de Janeiro, where she is still based. She works primarily as a radio producer and program presenter, e.g. the daily radio show Teatro em cena ('Theatre on Stage') at the radio channel Roquette-Pinto. At TV channel TV ALERJ she's working with various cultural programs, and during 2007–11 she produced the weekly show Perfil ('Profile').

Rogéria Gomes has worked as a cultural journalist since around 1990. She writes on the subject of theatre in Tribuna da Imprensa, Revista Manchete, Contigo, Amiga and other magazines. Furthermore, she often publishes in university revues such as Revista Nacional.

== As grandes damas ==
Gomes published in 2011 the book As grandes damas – e um perfil do teatro brasileiro ('The Grand Ladies: and a Profile of the Brazilian Theatre'), on the subject of the history of the theatre of Brazil. In the book she presents the story of Brazilian theatre through nine well-known female performers:

- Bibi Ferreira
- Eva Todor
- Eva Wilma
- Beatriz Lyra
- Norma Blum
- Laura Cardoso
- Ruth de Souza
- Nicette Bruno
- Beatriz Segall

In the book she painted a picture of Brazilian theatre against the backdrop of several centuries, where Jesuits used theatre in the 16th century to spread European civilisation among the indigenous population, theatrical revues started mid-19th century, and early 20th century witnessed new experimentation on stage. While authoring the book, she also noticed that this new generation of performers all tried to counter the norm of the ruling military dictatorship.

=== Other activities ===
Rogéria Gomes is frequently present as lecturer at conferences, on the subject of Brazilian theatre. At Teatro Vivo para Todos she is head of the educational project Conversa com autor, together with students, researchers and teachers. She has taught courses on the subject of social communication, at Universo (in Goiás) and other Brazilian universities.

In 2014 Gomes received the award "Troféu Carlos Drummond de Andrade" in the category of literary writing.

== Bibliography ==
- 2011 – As grandes damas – e um perfil do teatro brasileiro, Ed. Tinta Negra. ISBN 9788563876188 (in Portuguese)
