= Georgi Petrov (judoka) =

Bulgarian judoka

Personal information
- Nationality: Bulgarian
- Born: 17 September 1954 (age 70); Montana, Bulgaria

Sport
- Sport: Judo

Georgi Petrov (Bulgarian: Георги Петров, born 17 September 1954) is a Bulgarian judoka. He competed at the 1980 Summer Olympics and the 1988 Summer Olympics.

== Games played ==
Georgi Petrov played In the 1980 Summer Olympics held in Moscow, Russia and the 1988 Summer Olympics held in Seoul, South Korea.

Year	Location	Sport	Weight Class	Result
1980	Moscow, Russia	Judo	Half-Middleweight (≤78 kilograms)	# =7
1988	Seoul, South Korea	Judo	Middleweight (≤86 kilograms)	# =7
