= Mamudu Adamu =

Nigerian judoka (1960-)

Personal information
- Nationality: Nigerian
- Born: 22 September 1960 (age 64)

Sport
- Sport: Judo

Mamudu Adamu (born 22 September 1960) is a Nigerian judoka, He competed in the, 1988 Summer Olympics.
