= Berkane Lakhdar Adda =

Algerian judoka

Personal information
- Nationality: Algerian
- Born: 5 November 1958 (age 66)
- Height: 1.78 m (5 ft 10 in)
- Weight: 78 kg (172 lb)

Sport
- Sport: Judo

Berkane Lakhdar Adda (born 5 November 1958) is an Algerian judoka. He competed in the 1980 Summer Olympics.
