= Waldemar Legień =

Polish judoka (born 1963)

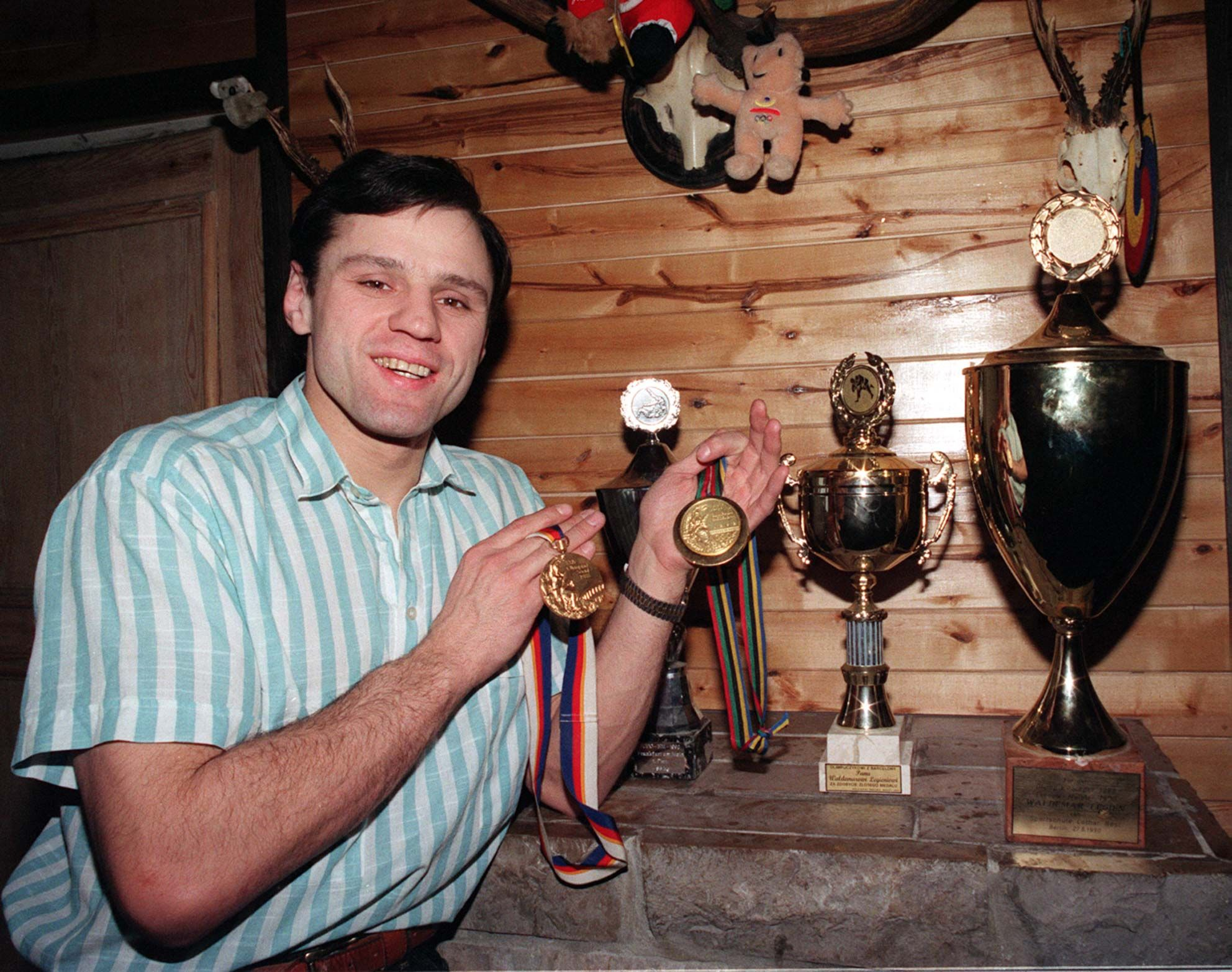

Personal information
- Born: 28 August 1963 (age 63) Bytom, Polish People’s Republic
- Occupation: Judoka
- Height: 1.80 m (5 ft 11 in)

Sport
- Country: Poland
- Sport: Judo
- Weight class: –78 kg, –86 kg
- Rank: 7th dan black belt
- Club: Czarni Bytom

Achievements and titles
- Olympic Games: (gold) (1988, 1992)
- World Champ.: (bronze) (1987, 1989, 1991)
- European Champ.: (gold) (1990)
Medal record
Men's judo
Representing Poland
Olympic Games
Gold medal – first place	1988 Seoul	‍–‍78 kg
Gold medal – first place	1992 Barcelona	‍–‍86 kg
World Championships
Bronze medal – third place	1987 Essen	‍–‍78 kg
Bronze medal – third place	1989 Belgrade	‍–‍78 kg
Bronze medal – third place	1991 Barcelona	‍–‍86 kg
European Championships
Gold medal – first place	1990 Frankfurt	‍–‍86 kg
Silver medal – second place	1985 Hamar	‍–‍78 kg
Bronze medal – third place	1986 Belgrade	‍–‍78 kg
European Junior Championships
Gold medal – first place	1981 San Marino	‍–‍71 kg
Bronze medal – third place	1982 Tirgoviste	‍–‍71 kg

Profile at external databases
- IJF: 1605
- JudoInside.com: 1134
- Updated on 5 June 2023

Waldemar Legień (born 28 August 1963) is a Polish retired judoka. He won two Olympic gold medals in different weight classes, in 1988 and 1992. He is also the first person to win back-to-back two Olympic gold medals in Judo.

For his achievements, he received the Commandor's Cross of the Order of Polonia Restituta in 2019 (previously Knight's Cross in 1988 and Officer's Cross in 1992).

Legień is the manager of Racing Club de France in Paris.

Olympic Games
Preceded by Bogdan Daras	Flagbearer for Poland; 1992 Barcelona	Succeeded by Rafał Szukała
