= Mircea Frățică =

Romanian judoka (born 1957)

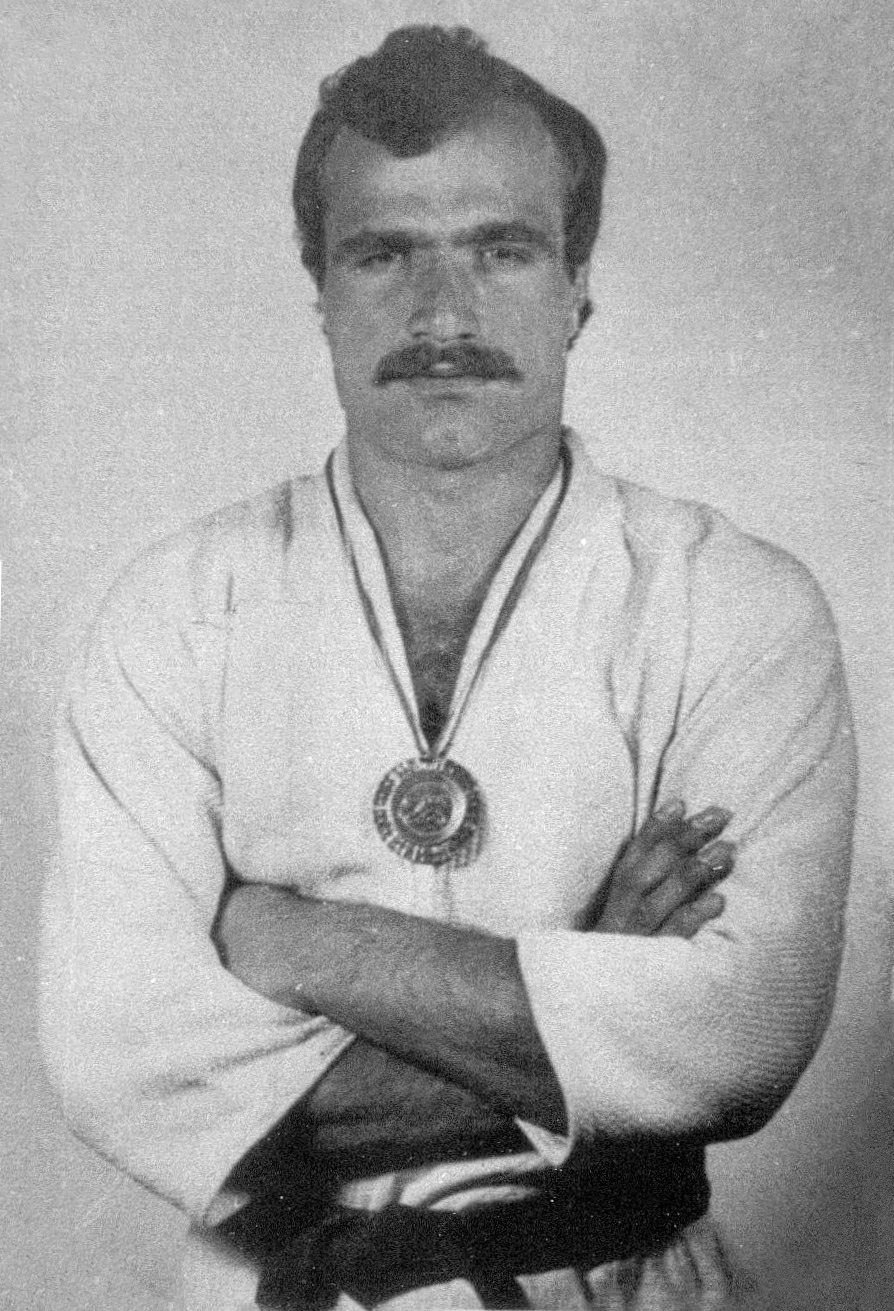

Personal information
- Born: 14 July 1957 (age 68) Pogoanele, Romania
- Occupation: Judoka
- Height: 175 cm (5 ft 9 in)

Sport
- Country: Romania
- Sport: Judo
- Weight class: ‍–‍78 kg
- Club: Energia București
- Coached by: Gheorghe Gujbă; Sorin Arjoca; Ilie Gheorghe

Achievements and titles
- Olympic Games: (bronze) (1984)
- World Champ.: (bronze) (1983)
- European Champ.: (gold) (1982)
Medal record
Men's judo
Representing Romania
Olympic Games
Bronze medal – third place	1984 Los Angeles	‍–‍78 kg
World Championships
Bronze medal – third place	1983 Moscow	‍–‍78 kg
European Championships
Gold medal – first place	1982 Rostock	‍–‍78 kg
Bronze medal – third place	1980 Vienna	‍–‍78 kg

Profile at external databases
- IJF: 26713
- JudoInside.com: 5721
- Updated on 19 June 2023

Mircea Frățică (born 14 July 1957) is a Romanian retired middleweight judoka who won the European title in 1982. Frățică also won bronze medals at the 1980 European Championships, 1983 World Championships and 1984 Olympics. Between 1976 and 1985 was coached by Clubul Sportiv Nitramonia Făgăraș (Nitramonia Făgăraș Sports Club) founder and coach, Gheorghe (Gelu) Gujbă, under whose direction he marked the above achievements. Frățică later joined Nitramonia Făgăraș as a coach alongside Gujbă before moving on to Liberty Oradea where his team won the 1999 European Cup Championship.
