= Nikola Filipov =

Bulgarian judoka

Personal information
- Nationality: Bulgarian
- Born: 13 July 1965 (age 59); Haskovo, Bulgaria
- Occupation: Judoka

Sport
- Sport: Judo

Profile at external databases
- JudoInside.com: 36697

Nikola Filipov (born 13 July 1965) is a Bulgarian judoka. He competed in the men's middleweight event at the 1992 Summer Olympics.
