= Joseph Wanag =

American judoka (born 1966)

Personal information
- Born: August 2, 1966 (age 60) Wilton, Connecticut, United States

Sport
- Sport: Judo
Medal record
Representing United States
Pan American Games
Gold medal – first place	1991 Havana	Middleweight

Joseph Paul Wanag (born August 2, 1966) is an American judoka. He trained under Kiyoshi Shiina. In 1992, Joe competed as member of the judo team representing the United States at the Olympic Summer Games held in Barcelona, Spain. He is a native of Wilton, Fairfield County, Connecticut, and graduated from Saint Lukes School in New Canaan.

He is a World University champion and a Pan American champion. He has also placed in the 1991 World Championships, U.S; Open champion, Collegiate Champion, numerous national championships, and has also been inducted into the U.S. Judo Hall of Fame. Joseph appeared in numerous publications, including the Judo Journal Newspaper, People Magazine, and United States Judo Federation Newspaper. He now lives in Litchfield County, Connecticut, with his children.
