= Temel Çakiroglu =

Turkish judoka

Temel Çakıroğlu
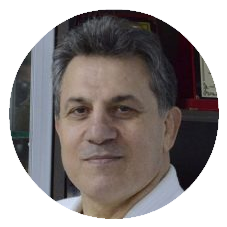

Personal information
- Nationality: Turkish
- Born: 17 April 1959 (age 65)
- Occupation: Judoka

Sport
- Sport: Judo

Profile at external databases
- IJF: 53712
- JudoInside.com: 36712

Temel Çakıroğlu (born 17 April 1959) is a Turkish judoka. He competed in the men's half-middleweight event at the 1988 Summer Olympics.
