= Bashir Varaev =

Russian judoka

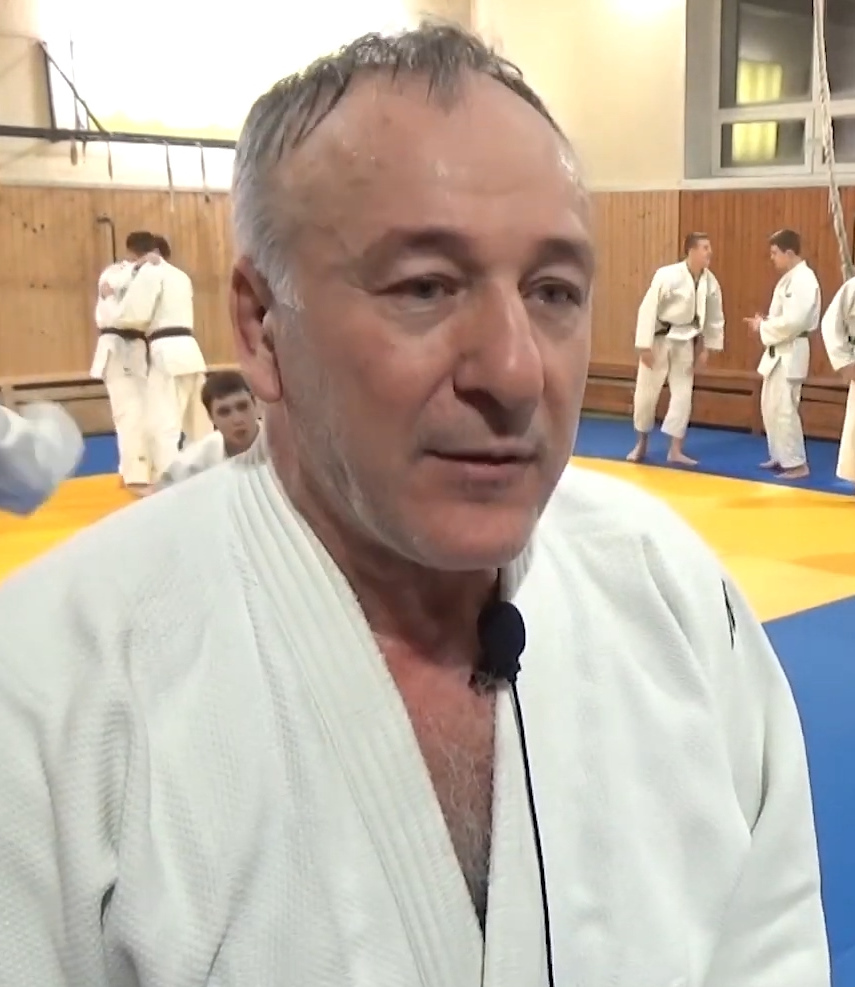
- Varaev in 2021

Personal information
- Native name: Башир Вараев
- Born: 23 February 1964 (age 62) Grozny, Chechnya, Soviet Union
- Occupation: Judoka

Sport
- Country: Soviet Union
- Sport: Judo
- Weight class: ‍–‍78 kg

Achievements and titles
- Olympic Games: (bronze) (1988)
- World Champ.: (silver) (1987)
- European Champ.: (gold) (1987, 1988, 1989, 1990)
Medal record
Men's judo
Representing Soviet Union
Olympic Games
Bronze medal – third place	1988 Seoul	‍–‍78 kg
World Championships
Silver medal – second place	1987 Essen	‍–‍78 kg
Bronze medal – third place	1989 Belgrade	‍–‍78 kg
Bronze medal – third place	1991 Barcelona	‍–‍78 kg
European Championships
Gold medal – first place	1987 Paris	‍–‍78 kg
Gold medal – first place	1988 Pamplona	‍–‍78 kg
Gold medal – first place	1989 Helsinki	‍–‍78 kg
Gold medal – first place	1990 Frankfurt	‍–‍78 kg
Bronze medal – third place	1991 Prague	‍–‍78 kg
World Juniors Championships
Silver medal – second place	1983 Mayaguez	‍–‍71 kg
European Junior Championships
Gold medal – first place	1983 Arnhem	‍–‍71 kg
Gold medal – first place	1984 Cadiz	‍–‍71 kg

Profile at external databases
- IJF: 1954
- JudoInside.com: 5916
- Updated on 6 June 2023

Bashir Varaev (Russian: Башир Вараев, also spelled Varayev, born 23 February 1964) is a Russian judoka who competed for the Soviet Union at the 1988 Summer Olympics, where he won a bronze medal in the half middleweight class.
