= Brett Barron =

American judoka (born 1959)

Personal information
- Born: 22 September 1959 (age 66)
- Occupation: Judoka

Sport
- Sport: Judo

Profile at external databases
- JudoInside.com: 5996

Brett Barron (born September 22, 1959) was a member of the 1984 US Olympic judo team, from San Mateo. He would earn 5 gold in US National Championships and 5 bronze medals. He injured his shoulder in the 1984 Olympic Games but tied for 9th place. Barron was the 2004 Olympic judo team coach.
