= António Roquete (judoka) =

Portuguese judoka

Personal information
- Full name: António Manuel Roquete Garcia de Andrade
- Nationality: Portuguese
- Born: 26 May 1955 (age 69)
- Height: 180 cm (5 ft 11 in)
- Weight: 78 kg (172 lb)

Sport
- Sport: Judo

António Manuel Roquete Garcia de Andrade (born 26 May 1955) is a Portuguese judoka. He competed at the 1972, 1976, 1980 and the 1984 Summer Olympics.
