= Ignacio Sanz =

Spanish judoka

Ignacio Sanz Paz
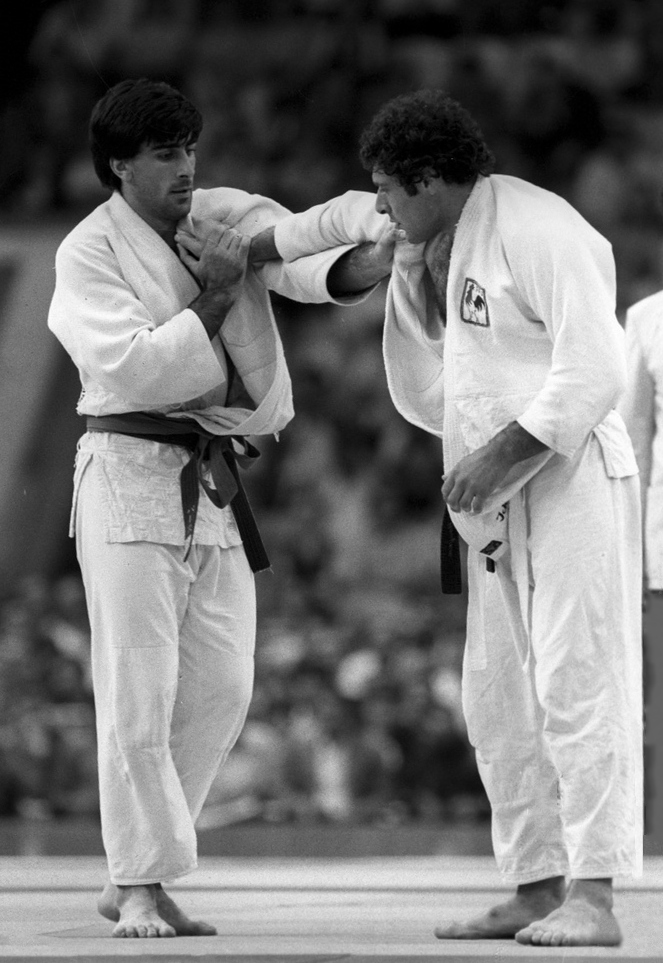
- Sanz (left) at the 1980 Olympics

Personal information
- Born: 30 November 1955 (age 70)
- Height: 177 cm (5 ft 10 in)
- Weight: 78 kg (172 lb)

Sport
- Sport: Judo

Ignacio Sanz Paz (born 30 November 1955) is a retired Spanish judoka. He competed in the 1980 and 1984 Summer Olympics and placed fifth in 1980.
