= Rogéria Santos =

Brazilian politician (born 1966)

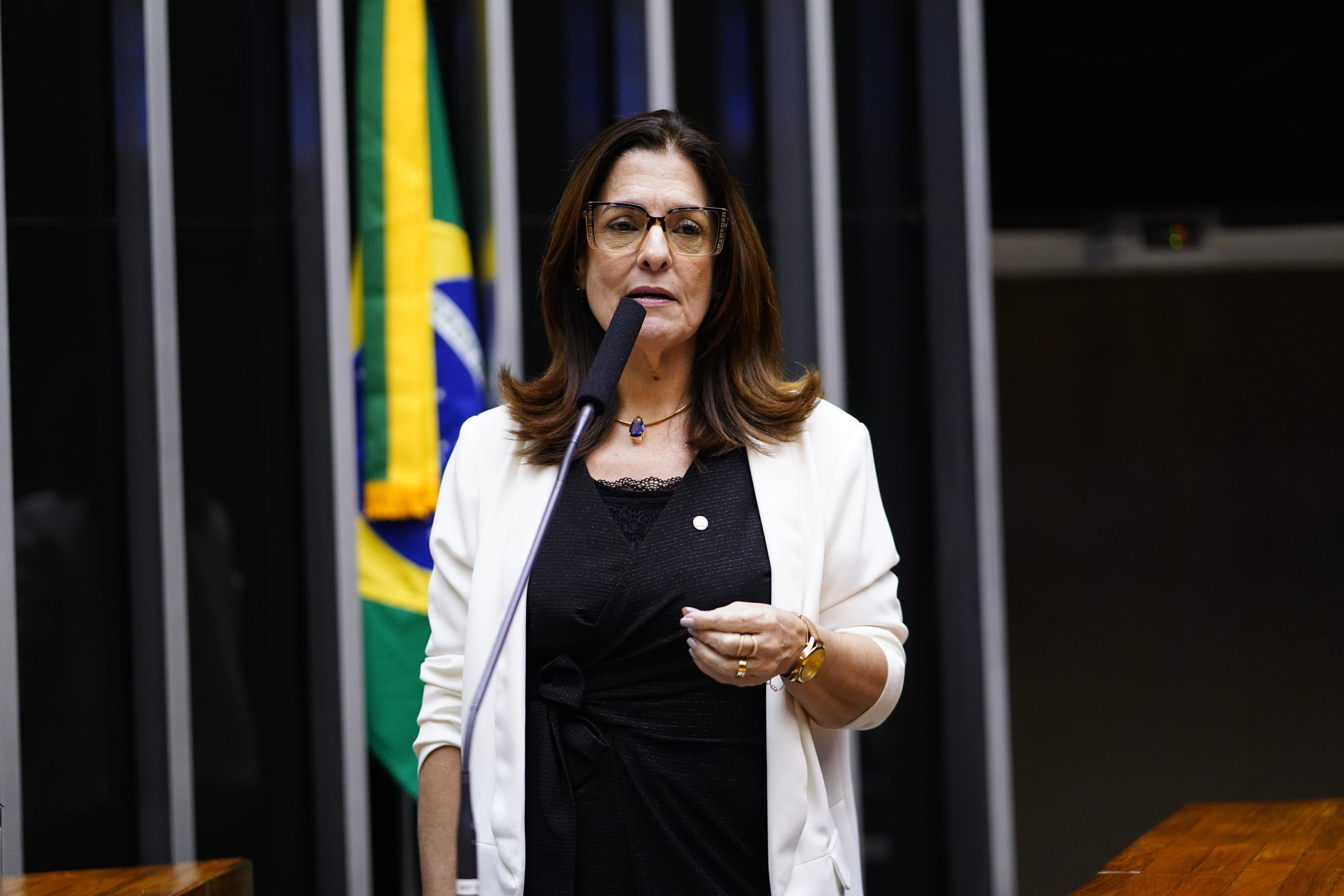
- Rogéria Santos
- Constituency: Bahia

Member of the Chamber of Deputies
- In office 1 February 2023 – present

Coucilor of Salvador, Bahia
- In office 2016–2020

Personal details
- Born: 19 August 1966 (age 60) Rio de Janeiro
- Party: REP (since 2015)
- Profession: lawyer, politician
- Website: rogeriasantos.com.br

Rogéria de Almeida Pereira dos Santos (August 19, 1966) is a Brazilian missionary, lawyer and politician, affiliated with the Republican party, elected in 2022 as Federal Deputy for Bahia.

== Biography ==
Santos served as a missionary for the Universal Church of the Kingdom of God and the Church is a big part of her voter base.

She was elected 2016 in the city council of Salvador, reaching 12,303 votes (1.06%).

In 2022 she was elected federal deputy with 82,012 of the valid votes (1.03%).
