= Carlos Huttich =

Mexican judoka (born 1963)

Personal information
- Nationality: Mexican
- Born: 24 February 1963 (age 62)

Sport
- Sport: Judo

Carlos Huttich (born 24 February 1963) is a Mexican judoka. He competed at the 1984 Summer Olympics and the 1988 Summer Olympics.
