= Pedro Cristóvão =

Portuguese judoka

Personal information
- Nationality: Portuguese
- Born: 4 June 1965 (age 59); Lisbon, Portugal
- Occupation: Judoka

Sport
- Sport: Judo

Pedro Cristóvão (born 4 June 1965) is a Portuguese judoka. He competed at the 1988 Summer Olympics and the 1992 Summer Olympics.
