= Filip Leščak =

Slovenian judoka

Personal information
- Nationality: Slovenian
- Born: 13 December 1960 (age 65) Maribor, Yugoslavia
- Occupation: Judoka

Sport
- Sport: Judo

Profile at external databases
- JudoInside.com: 5530

Filip Leščak (born 13 December 1960) is a Slovenian judoka. He competed at the 1984 and the 1988 Summer Olympics, representing Yugoslavia. At the 1992 Summer Olympics, Leščak represented Slovenia.

Leščak went to coaching at the Drava JK. After retiring from playing, he served as judo coach at the 2000 and 2008 editions.
